= Pakhria =

Coordinates: 25°53′N 86°51′E

- village
- Interactive map of Pakhria
- Country: India
- State: Meghalaya
- District: East Khasi Hills

Languages
  - Official: English
- Time zone: UTC+5:30 (IST)
- Telephone code: 793108
- Vehicle registration: ML
- Nearest city: Cherrapunji

Pakhria is a village situated in East Khasi Hills District, in the state of Meghalaya, India. Agriculture is the main activity of this village.

The village comes under the Pynursla community development block as well as the Pynursla Assembly constituency (in the Nongshken polling subdivision) and constituency for the Khasi Hills Autonomous District Council.
