= Meghalaya thick-thumbed bat =

Conservation status
- Data Deficient (IUCN 3.1)

Scientific classification
- Kingdom: Animalia
- Phylum: Chordata
- Class: Mammalia
- Order: Chiroptera
- Family: Vespertilionidae
- Genus: Glischropus
- Species: G. meghalayanus

Binomial name
- Glischropus meghalayanus Saikia, Ruedi & Csorba, 2022
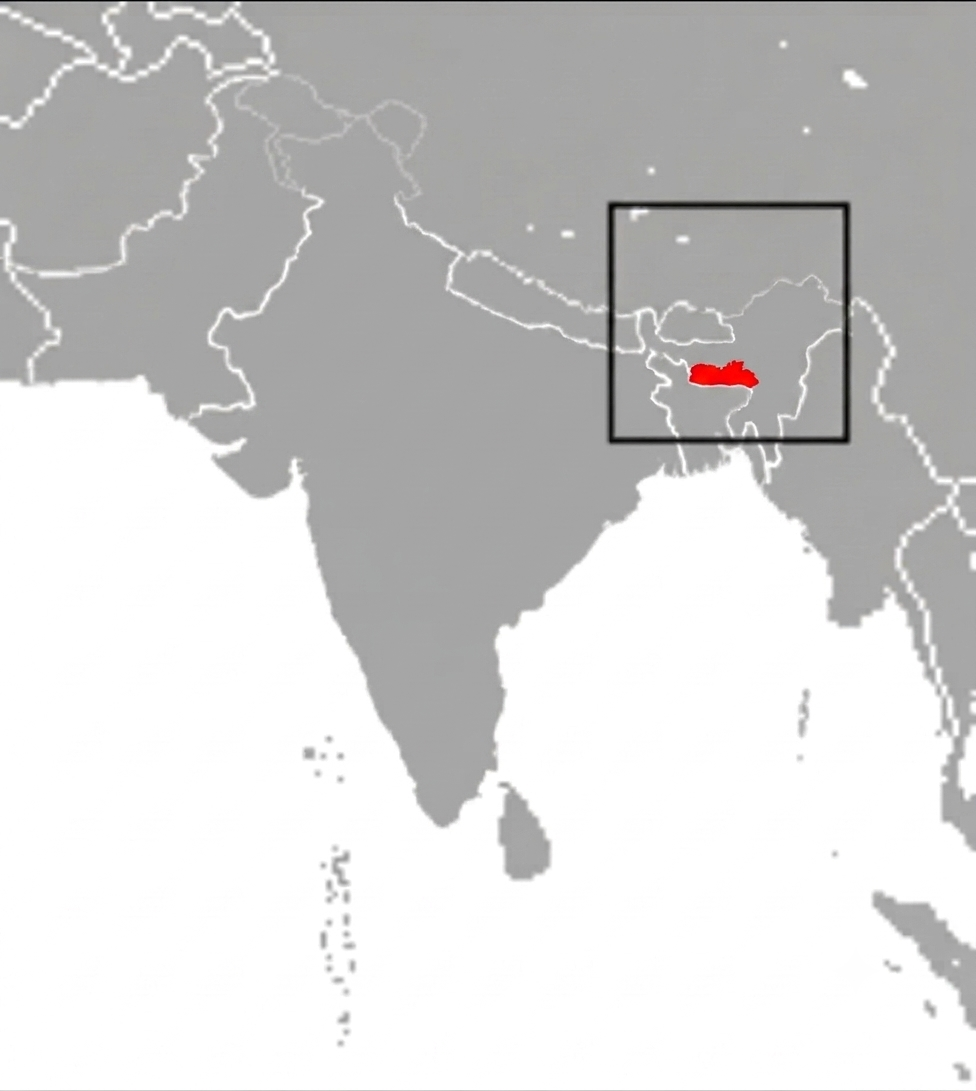
- Meghalaya thick-thumbed bat range

Species of bat

Meghalaya thick-thumbed bat (Glischropus meghalayanus) is a species of thick-thumbed bat in the family Vespertionidae. It is endemic to the Indian state of Meghalaya, where it was discovered near Nongkhyllem Wildlife Sanctuary in Ri Bhoi district. The species was formally described in 2022 and is distinguished from the other members of genus Glischropus by its unique morphological characteristics and genetic divergence. Like other thick-thumbed bats, it is adapted to roosting inside bamboo internode and has fleshy pads on its thumbs and feet that help it climb smooth bamboo surfaces.

== Discovery ==
It was discovered during faunal surveys conducted in the forest areas surrounding Nongkhyllem Wildlife Sanctuary in Ri Bhoi district, Meghalaya. The first specimen was collected in 2020 by zoologist Uttam Saikia of the Zoological Survey of India. Detailed morphological examinations and comparisons with all previously described species of the genus Glischropus revealed distinct differences in cranial, dental, bacular and external characterstics, confirming it as a species new to science. The species was formally described in 2022 in the peer-reviewed journal Zootaxa by Uttam Saikia, Gàbor Csorba, and Manuel Ruedi. The discovery represents the first record of a thick-tumbed bat from India and South Asia, extending the known distribution of the genus Glischropus westward by 1,000 km.

== Taxonomy ==
Glischropus meghalayanus belongs to the family Vespertilionidae and the genus Glischropus (thick-thumbed bats).

== Description ==
Glischropus meghalayanus is a small species of thick-tumbered bat with a forearm length of approx 32-33 mm it has dark brown dorsal fur and a distinctly demarcated beige ventral fur. Giving a clear contrast between upper and lower body. Like other members of the genus Glischropus it poses fleshy callosities on thumbs and soles of the feet, adaptions that enable it to cling to the smooth inner surface of bamboo internodes, where it typically roots. Based on its wing morphology and observed slow, fluttering flight, the species is considered as edge-space aerial forager, foraging primarily along forest edges and within cluttered vegetation.
