= Nongpoh Assembly constituency =

Legislative Assembly constituency in Meghalaya State, India

Coordinates: 25.86°N 91.84°E

Nongpoh
- Constituency No. 9 for the Meghalaya Legislative Assembly

Constituency details
- Country: India
- Region: Northeast India
- State: Meghalaya
- District: Ri Bhoi
- Lok Sabha constituency: Shillong
- Established: 1972
- Total electors: 37,588
- Reservation: ST

Member of Legislative Assembly
- 11th Meghalaya Legislative Assembly
- Incumbent Mayralborn Syiem
- Party: BJP
- Alliance: NDA
- Elected year: 2023

Nongpoh is one of the 60 Legislative Assembly constituencies of Meghalaya state in India. It is part of Ri Bhoi district and is reserved for candidates belonging to the Scheduled Tribes. It falls under Shillong Lok Sabha constituency and its current MLA is Mayralborn Syiem of Bharatiya Janata Party.

== Members of the Legislative Assembly ==
Election	Name	Party
Assam
1967	B. B. Lyngdoh	All Party Hill Leaders Conference
Meghalaya
1972	Dr. D. D. Lapang	Independent politician
1978	Dr. D. D. Lapang	Indian National Congress
1983	Dr. D. D. Lapang	Indian National Congress
1988	Dr. D. D. Lapang	Indian National Congress
1993	Constantine Lyngdoh	Hill State People's Democratic Party
1998	Dr. D. D. Lapang	Indian National Congress
2003	Dr. D. D. Lapang	Indian National Congress
2008	Dr. D. D. Lapang	Indian National Congress
2013	Dr. D. D. Lapang	Indian National Congress
2018	Mayralborn Syiem (Note: Elected as United Democratic Party. Switched to BJP in Sept 2026)	Indian National Congress
2023	Mayralborn Syiem	United Democratic Party

== Election results ==
=== Assembly Election 2023 ===
2023 Meghalaya Legislative Assembly election: Nongpoh
Party	Candidate	Votes	%	±%
UDP	Mayralborn Syiem	14,940	45.86%	▲17.78
INC	Rona Khymdeit	8,254	25.34%	▼14.73
NPP	Macdalyn Sawkmie Mawlong	7,446	22.86%	▲4.32
BJP	Marian Maring	1,079	3.31%	▲0.59
AITC	Long Singh Bey	661	2.03%	New
Independent	Bismo Ingtih	195	0.60%	New
NOTA	None of the Above	300	0.92%	▼0.19
Margin of victory		6,686	20.52%	▲8.55
Turnout		32,575	86.66%	▼3.36
Registered electors		37,588		▲21.92
UDP gain from INC		Swing	▲5.80	

=== Assembly Election 2018 ===
2018 Meghalaya Legislative Assembly election: Nongpoh
Party	Candidate	Votes	%	±%
INC	Mayralborn Syiem	11,119	40.07%	▼10.82
UDP	Rona Khymdeit	7,795	28.09%	▼6.04
NPP	Cleophas B. Syiem	5,144	18.54%	New
Independent	Manin Raja	1,085	3.91%	New
PDF	Patboone Syngkli	800	2.88%	New
BJP	Marian Maring	755	2.72%	New
AAP	Dedrict Binong	311	1.12%	New
NOTA	None of the Above	308	1.11%	New
Margin of victory		3,324	11.98%	▼4.78
Turnout		27,752	90.02%	▲0.69
Registered electors		30,829		▲28.24
INC hold		Swing	▼10.82	

=== Assembly Election 2013 ===
2013 Meghalaya Legislative Assembly election: Nongpoh
Party	Candidate	Votes	%	±%
INC	Dr. D. D. Lapang	10,927	50.88%	▲0.20
UDP	Rona Khymdeit	7,329	34.13%	▼13.23
Independent	Badhok Nongmalieh	2,573	11.98%	New
HSPDP	Paskal Lyngkhoi	381	1.77%	▼0.19
NCP	Charles G.R.Syngkli	265	1.23%	New
Margin of victory		3,598	16.75%	▲13.43
Turnout		21,475	89.33%	▼1.42
Registered electors		24,041		▲0.75
INC hold		Swing	▲0.20	

=== Assembly Election 2008 ===
2008 Meghalaya Legislative Assembly election: Nongpoh
Party	Candidate	Votes	%	±%
INC	Dr. D. D. Lapang	10,974	50.68%	▼0.46
UDP	Dr. Celestine Lyngdoh	10,254	47.35%	▲7.40
HSPDP	Markus Lyngdoh	426	1.97%	New
Margin of victory		720	3.33%	▼7.86
Turnout		21,654	90.74%	▲25.49
Registered electors		23,863		▲1.98
INC hold		Swing		

=== Assembly Election 2003 ===
2003 Meghalaya Legislative Assembly election: Nongpoh
Party	Candidate	Votes	%	±%
INC	Dr. D. D. Lapang	7,808	51.14%	▼4.38
UDP	Constantine Lyngdoh	6,100	39.95%	▼0.24
BJP	E. G. Khongjoh	691	4.53%	▲1.98
KHNAM	K. N. Roberts	670	4.39%	New
Margin of victory		1,708	11.19%	▼4.14
Turnout		15,269	65.43%	▼11.74
Registered electors		23,400		▲10.27
INC hold		Swing	▼4.38	

=== Assembly Election 1998 ===
1998 Meghalaya Legislative Assembly election: Nongpoh
Party	Candidate	Votes	%	±%
INC	Dr. D. D. Lapang	9,070	55.52%	▲9.82
UDP	Constantine Lyngdoh	6,566	40.19%	New
BJP	E. B. H. Hynniewta	416	2.55%	New
HSPDP	L. J. Franco Marten	285	1.74%	▼51.80
Margin of victory		2,504	15.33%	▲7.48
Turnout		16,337	79.81%	▼3.58
Registered electors		21,220		▲22.47
INC gain from HSPDP		Swing	▲1.98	

=== Assembly Election 1993 ===
1993 Meghalaya Legislative Assembly election: Nongpoh
Party	Candidate	Votes	%	±%
HSPDP	Constantine Lyngdoh	7,474	53.54%	▲19.64
INC	Donwa Dethwelson Lapang	6,379	45.70%	▲0.59
Janata Dal (B)	Gershom N Syngkli	106	0.76%	New
Margin of victory		1,095	7.84%	▼3.36
Turnout		13,959	82.40%	▲3.28
Registered electors		17,326		▲26.93
HSPDP gain from INC		Swing		

=== Assembly Election 1988 ===
1988 Meghalaya Legislative Assembly election: Nongpoh
Party	Candidate	Votes	%	±%
INC	Dr. D. D. Lapang	4,758	45.10%	▲5.48
HSPDP	Chosterfield Khongwir	3,576	33.90%	▲2.17
HPU	Rangkynsai Makdoh	2,215	21.00%	New
Margin of victory		1,182	11.20%	▲3.31
Turnout		10,549	80.30%	▲10.03
Registered electors		13,650		▲20.55
INC hold		Swing		

=== Assembly Election 1983 ===
1983 Meghalaya Legislative Assembly election: Nongpoh
Party	Candidate	Votes	%	±%
INC	Dr. D. D. Lapang	3,017	39.62%	▲4.73
HSPDP	Chosterfield Khongwir	2,416	31.73%	▲8.66
PDC	Thomas Roy Malai	1,535	20.16%	New
APHLC	Andreas Khongjee	573	7.52%	▼17.91
Independent	James C. Khyriem	74	0.97%	New
Margin of victory		601	7.89%	▼1.56
Turnout		7,615	72.30%	▲5.15
Registered electors		11,323		▲10.35
INC hold		Swing	▲4.73	

=== Assembly Election 1978 ===
1978 Meghalaya Legislative Assembly election: Nongpoh
Party	Candidate	Votes	%	±%
INC	Dr. D. D. Lapang	2,223	34.89%	New
APHLC	Andreas Khongjee	1,621	25.44%	▲5.85
HSPDP	Marcus Lyngdoh	1,470	23.07%	New
Independent	Lajro Singh Khymdiet	1,058	16.60%	New
Margin of victory		602	9.45%	▼0.94
Turnout		6,372	66.08%	▲14.95
Registered electors		10,261		▲27.59
INC gain from Independent		Swing	▲4.14	

=== Assembly Election 1972 ===
1972 Meghalaya Legislative Assembly election: Nongpoh
Party	Candidate	Votes	%	±%
Independent	Dr. D. D. Lapang	1,166	30.75%	New
Independent	A. Alley	772	20.36%	New
APHLC	Horen Jones Rotan	743	19.59%	New
Independent	Markus Lyngdoh	503	13.26%	New
Independent	Lebanon Kharkonbor	406	10.71%	New
Independent	J. Rynshon	202	5.33%	New
Margin of victory		394	10.39%	
Turnout		3,792	50.76%	
Registered electors		8,042		
Independent win (new seat)				

== See also ==
- List of constituencies of the Meghalaya Legislative Assembly
- Nongpoh
- Ri-Bhoi district
- Shillong (Lok Sabha constituency)
