= Mayralborn Syiem =

Indian politician (born 1980)

Mayralborn Syiem (born 20 May 1980) is an Indian politician from Meghalaya. He is a member of the Meghalaya Legislative Assembly from the Nongpoh Assembly constituency, which is reserved for Scheduled Tribe community in Ri Bhoi district. He won the 2023 Meghalaya Legislative Assembly election representing the United Democratic Party.

In September 2026, Syiem was part of a major legislative shift in Meghalaya politics when he, along with seven other MLAs, defected from the United Democratic Party to merge with the Bharatiya Janata Party legislature party after high-profile meetings with Union Home Minister Amit Shah and Assam Chief Minister Himanta Biswa Sarma in New Delhi.

== Early life and education ==
Syiem is from Pahamsohthri, Nongpoh, Ri Bhoi district, Meghalaya. He is the son of J Syiem. He completed his MA in 2004 at North Eastern Hills University.

== Career ==
Syiem was elected from the Nongpoh Assembly constituency representing the United Democratic Party in the 2023 Meghalaya Legislative Assembly election. He polled 14,940 votes and defeated his nearest rival, Rona Khymdeit of the Indian National Congress, by a margin of 6,137 votes. He first became an MLA winning the 2018 Meghalaya Legislative Assembly election on the Indian National Congress ticket.
