= Mawlai Assembly constituency =

Legislative Assembly constituency in Meghalaya State, India

Coordinates: 25.62°N 91.88°E

Mawlai
- Constituency No. 15 for the Meghalaya Legislative Assembly

Constituency details
- Country: India
- Region: Northeast India
- State: Meghalaya
- District: East Khasi Hills
- Lok Sabha constituency: Shillong
- Established: 2003
- Total electors: 50,101
- Reservation: ST

Member of Legislative Assembly
- 11th Meghalaya Legislative Assembly
- Incumbent Brightstarwell Marbaniang
- Party: VPP
- Elected year: 2023

Mawlai is one of the 60 Legislative Assembly constituencies of Meghalaya state in India.

It is part of East Khasi Hills district and is reserved for candidates belonging to the Scheduled Tribes.

== Members of the Legislative Assembly ==
| Election | Name | Party |
|---|---|---|
| 1972 | Stanlington David Khongwir | Independent politician |
| 1978 | Stanlington David Khongwir | Hill State People's Democratic Party |
| 1983 | Stanlington David Khongwir | Hill State People's Democratic Party |
| 1988 | S. D. Khongwir | Hill People's Union |
| 1993 | S. D. Khongwir | Hill People's Union |
| 1998 | Process T. Sawkmie | United Democratic Party |
| 2003 | Process T. Sawkmie | Meghalaya Democratic Party |
| 2008 | Founder Strong Cajee | Indian National Congress |
| 2013 | Embhahlang Syiemlieh | United Democratic Party |
| 2018 | Process T. Sawkmie | Indian National Congress |
| 2023 | Brightstarwell Marbaniang | Voice of the People Party |

== Election results ==
=== Assembly Election 2023 ===
2023 Meghalaya Legislative Assembly election: Mawlai
| Party | Candidate | Votes | % | ±% |
|---|---|---|---|---|
| VPP | Brightstarwell Marbaniang | 24,262 | 59.92% | New |
| NPP | Teiborlang Pathaw | 8,614 | 21.27% | New |
| UDP | Process T. Sawkmie | 5,142 | 12.70% | ▼8.50 |
| INC | Marbud Dkhar | 1,506 | 3.72% | ▼22.10 |
| BJP | Wandonbok Jyrwa | 450 | 1.11% | New |
| Independent | Tarcisious Mawlot | 264 | 0.65% | New |
| AITC | Stepbournekupar Ryndem | 255 | 0.63% | New |
| NOTA | None of the Above | 254 | 0.63% | ▼0.38 |
| Margin of victory | | 15,648 | 38.64% | ▲34.25 |
| Turnout | | 40,493 | 80.82% | ▼3.13 |
| Registered electors | | 50,101 | | ▲17.36 |
| VPP gain from INC | | Swing | ▲34.10 | |

=== Assembly Election 2018 ===
2018 Meghalaya Legislative Assembly election: Mawlai
| Party | Candidate | Votes | % | ±% |
|---|---|---|---|---|
| INC | Process T. Sawkmie | 9,253 | 25.82% | ▼3.54 |
| Independent | Teiborlang Pathaw | 7,679 | 21.43% | New |
| UDP | Embhahlang Syiemlieh | 7,599 | 21.20% | ▼28.73 |
| PDF | Sarita Lyngdoh | 6,336 | 17.68% | New |
| KHNAM | Bankyrshanborlang Lyngdoh Nongbri | 2,247 | 6.27% | ▼1.48 |
| Independent | Silvester Kurbah | 901 | 2.51% | New |
| AAP | Peter Aiborlang Dohkrut | 391 | 1.09% | New |
| NOTA | None of the Above | 361 | 1.01% | New |
| Margin of victory | | 1,574 | 4.39% | ▼16.18 |
| Turnout | | 35,840 | 83.95% | ▲1.79 |
| Registered electors | | 42,690 | | ▲24.83 |
| INC gain from UDP | | Swing | ▼24.11 | |

=== Assembly Election 2013 ===
2013 Meghalaya Legislative Assembly election: Mawlai
| Party | Candidate | Votes | % | ±% |
|---|---|---|---|---|
| UDP | Embhahlang Syiemlieh | 14,029 | 49.93% | ▲9.55 |
| INC | Founder Strong Cajee | 8,250 | 29.36% | ▼24.23 |
| Independent | Teiborlang Pathaw | 3,641 | 12.96% | New |
| KHNAM | Pyndapborthiaw Saibon | 2,178 | 7.75% | ▲6.64 |
| Margin of victory | | 5,779 | 20.57% | ▲7.36 |
| Turnout | | 28,098 | 82.16% | ▼3.39 |
| Registered electors | | 34,199 | | ▲25.53 |
| UDP gain from INC | | Swing | ▼3.66 | |

=== Assembly Election 2008 ===
2008 Meghalaya Legislative Assembly election: Mawlai
| Party | Candidate | Votes | % | ±% |
|---|---|---|---|---|
| INC | Founder Strong Cajee | 12,490 | 53.59% | ▲50.33 |
| UDP | Process T. Sawkmie | 9,411 | 40.38% | ▲30.76 |
| NCP | Celestina Lamin | 1,028 | 4.41% | New |
| KHNAM | Shingly Nongkhlaw | 259 | 1.11% | New |
| LJP | Gregorius Kharnaior | 119 | 0.51% | New |
| Margin of victory | | 3,079 | 13.21% | ▲2.34 |
| Turnout | | 23,307 | 85.55% | ▲23.15 |
| Registered electors | | 27,243 | | ▲3.72 |
| INC gain from MDP | | Swing | ▲4.59 | |

=== Assembly Election 2003 ===
2003 Meghalaya Legislative Assembly election: Mawlai
| Party | Candidate | Votes | % | ±% |
|---|---|---|---|---|
| MDP | Process T. Sawkmie | 8,031 | 49.00% | New |
| PDM | Founder Strong Cajee | 6,249 | 38.12% | ▼6.35 |
| UDP | Shingly Nongkhlaw | 1,576 | 9.62% | ▼39.14 |
| INC | Amanda Pathaw | 535 | 3.26% | ▼3.50 |
| Margin of victory | | 1,782 | 10.87% | ▲6.59 |
| Turnout | | 16,391 | 62.40% | ▼3.33 |
| Registered electors | | 26,266 | | ▲9.00 |
| MDP gain from UDP | | Swing | ▲0.24 | |

=== Assembly Election 1998 ===
1998 Meghalaya Legislative Assembly election: Mawlai
| Party | Candidate | Votes | % | ±% |
|---|---|---|---|---|
| UDP | Process T. Sawkmie | 7,723 | 48.76% | New |
| PDM | Founder Strong Cajee | 7,045 | 44.48% | New |
| INC | Amanda Pathaw | 1,072 | 6.77% | ▼2.53 |
| Margin of victory | | 678 | 4.28% | ▼4.90 |
| Turnout | | 15,840 | 67.42% | ▼7.36 |
| Registered electors | | 24,097 | | ▲6.35 |
| UDP gain from HPU | | Swing | | |

=== Assembly Election 1993 ===
1993 Meghalaya Legislative Assembly election: Mawlai
| Party | Candidate | Votes | % | ±% |
|---|---|---|---|---|
| HPU | S. D. Khongwir | 6,291 | 37.98% | ▼21.64 |
| Independent | Founder Strong Cajee | 4,770 | 28.80% | New |
| AHL(AM) | Process T. Sawkmie | 3,746 | 22.62% | New |
| INC | Anthony Jala Kharbhih | 1,540 | 9.30% | ▲2.92 |
| Independent | Din Singh Dkhar | 215 | 1.30% | New |
| Margin of victory | | 1,521 | 9.18% | ▼32.96 |
| Turnout | | 16,562 | 73.99% | ▲4.59 |
| Registered electors | | 22,658 | | ▲49.93 |
| HPU hold | | Swing | ▼21.64 | |

=== Assembly Election 1988 ===
1988 Meghalaya Legislative Assembly election: Mawlai
| Party | Candidate | Votes | % | ±% |
|---|---|---|---|---|
| HPU | S. D. Khongwir | 6,172 | 59.62% | New |
| Independent | M. S. Lyngdoh Myrdon | 1,809 | 17.47% | New |
| HSPDP | Laborious M. S. Syiem | 1,711 | 16.53% | ▼34.40 |
| INC | Arflin Warlarpih | 660 | 6.38% | ▲1.03 |
| Margin of victory | | 4,363 | 42.15% | ▲34.94 |
| Turnout | | 10,352 | 69.65% | ▼4.93 |
| Registered electors | | 15,112 | | ▲32.24 |
| HPU gain from HSPDP | | Swing | ▲8.69 | |

=== Assembly Election 1983 ===
1983 Meghalaya Legislative Assembly election: Mawlai
| Party | Candidate | Votes | % | ±% |
|---|---|---|---|---|
| HSPDP | Stanlington David Khongwir | 4,274 | 50.93% | ▼15.75 |
| APHLC | Anthony Jala | 3,669 | 43.72% | ▲17.43 |
| INC | Daminot J. Wankhar | 449 | 5.35% | New |
| Margin of victory | | 605 | 7.21% | ▼33.18 |
| Turnout | | 8,392 | 76.30% | ▼1.62 |
| Registered electors | | 11,428 | | ▲20.24 |
| HSPDP hold | | Swing | | |

=== Assembly Election 1978 ===
1978 Meghalaya Legislative Assembly election: Mawlai
| Party | Candidate | Votes | % | ±% |
|---|---|---|---|---|
| HSPDP | Stanlington David Khongwir | 4,756 | 66.68% | New |
| APHLC | Stoshon Roy Nongrum | 1,875 | 26.29% | ▼17.62 |
| Independent | Leonis John Richard Lyngklyoi | 502 | 7.04% | New |
| Margin of victory | | 2,881 | 40.39% | ▲28.20 |
| Turnout | | 7,133 | 76.65% | ▲12.09 |
| Registered electors | | 9,504 | | ▲18.61 |
| HSPDP gain from Independent | | Swing | ▲10.58 | |

=== Assembly Election 1972 ===
1972 Meghalaya Legislative Assembly election: Mawlai
| Party | Candidate | Votes | % | ±% |
|---|---|---|---|---|
| Independent | Stanlington David Khongwir | 2,830 | 56.10% | New |
| APHLC | E. Bremly Lyngdoh | 2,215 | 43.90% | New |
| Margin of victory | | 615 | 12.19% | |
| Turnout | | 5,045 | 64.66% | |
| Registered electors | | 8,013 | | |
| Independent win (new seat) | | | | |

== See also ==
- List of constituencies of the Meghalaya Legislative Assembly
- East Khasi Hills district
