= Ri-Bhoi College =

- Type: Public
- Established: 1984
- Academic affiliations: North Eastern Hill University
- Location: Nongpoh, Meghalaya, India; 25.897°N 91.881°E
- Website: https://www.ribhoicollege.ac.in

Ri-Bhoi College, established in 1984, is a general degree college at Nongpoh, in Meghalaya. This college is affiliated with the North Eastern Hill University. This college offers bachelor's degrees in arts.
