= Glischropus bucephalus =

Conservation status
- Least Concern (IUCN 3.1)

Scientific classification
- Kingdom: Animalia
- Phylum: Chordata
- Class: Mammalia
- Order: Chiroptera
- Family: Vespertilionidae
- Genus: Glischropus
- Species: G. bucephalus

Binomial name
- Glischropus bucephalus Csorba, 2011
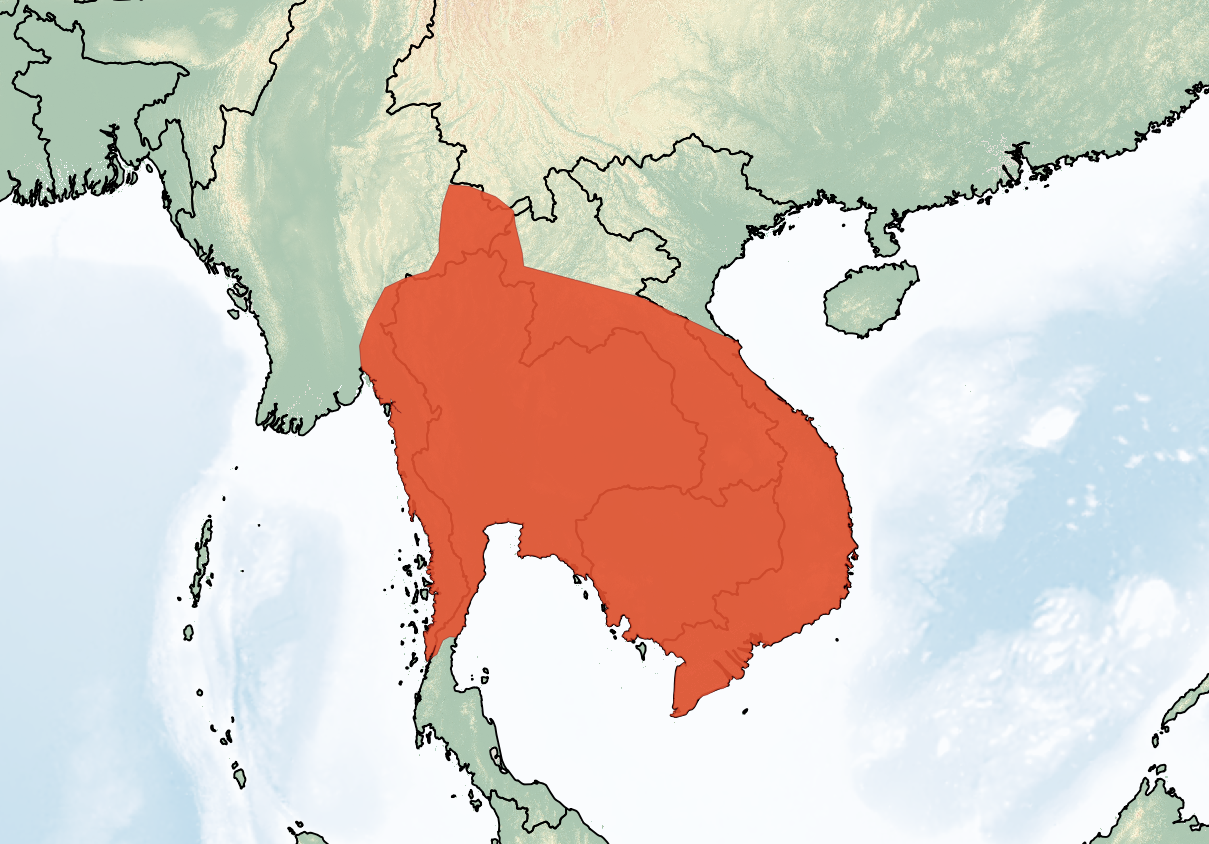

Species of bat

Glischropus bucephalus, the Indochinese thick-thumbed bat, is a species of bat in the family Vespertilionidae. The bat is found in Cambodia, Myanmar, Laos, Thailand and Vietnam north of the Isthmus of Kra.

== Taxonomy ==
Specimens of this species were formerly considered to be G. tylopus, but are now a distinct species, with G. tylopus restricted to the south of the Isthmus of Kra.

== Habitat and distribution ==
The bat is found in Cambodia, Myanmar, Laos, Thailand and Vietnam north of the Isthmus of Kra.

The bat is widespread and most probably roosts in bamboo forests.

== Conservation ==
The species may be threatened by the destruction of bamboo forests.
