= Brightstarwell Marbaniang =

Indian politician

Brightstarwell Marbaniang (born 1980) is an Indian politician from Meghalaya. He is a member of the Meghalaya Legislative Assembly from the Mawlai Assembly constituency, which is reserved for Scheduled Tribe community, in East Khasi Hills district. He was first elected in the 2023 Meghalaya Legislative Assembly election, representing the Voice of the People Party.

== Early life and education ==
Marbaniang is from Mawlai, East Khasi Hills district, Meghalaya. He is the son of Martin Majaw. He completed his M.A. degree in adult & continuing education at North Eastern Hill University in 2015. Earlier, he did an M.A. in human rights & duties education in 2013 at University of Madras and LLB in 2009 at NEHU. He served as an assistant professor. His wife is also an assistant professor.

== Career ==
Marbaniang won the Mawlai Assembly constituency representing the Voice of People Party in the 2023 Meghalaya Legislative Assembly election. He polled 24,262 votes and defeated his nearest rival, Teiborlang Pathaw of the National People's Party, by a margin of 15,648 votes. He also defeated another sitting MLA, T. Sawkmie of the United Democratic Party, and had the highest winning margin in the 2023 election.

=== Awards ===
- He received Mait Shaphrang Academic Excellence award in 2015.
