= Dasakhiatbha Lamare =

Indian politician

Dasakhiatbha Lamare (14 June 1992) is an Indian politician from Meghalaya. He is a former member of the Meghalaya Legislative Assembly from the Mawhati Assembly constituency, which is reserved for Scheduled Tribe community, in Ri Bhoi district, representing the National People's Party.

== Early life ==
Lamare is from Nongkrem, East Khasi Hills district, Meghalaya. He is the son of Ngaitlang Dhar. He studied till Class 12 at Pestle Weed College, Dehradun, and passed the Senior School Certificate Examination under the Central Board of Secondary Education (CBSE) in 2010. He runs his own business and declared assets worth Rs.40 crore in 2018 and Rs.45 crore in 2023, in his affidavits to the Election Commission of India.

== Career ==
Lamare won the Mawhati Assembly constituency in the 2018 Meghalaya Legislative Assembly election representing the National People's Party. He polled 6,365 votes and defeated his nearest rival, Julias Kitbok Dorphang, an independent candidate, by 204 votes. He moved to Nongkrem Assembly constituency and contested on the NPP ticket, but he could finish only third behind winner, Ardent Miller Basaiawmoit of the VPP, and Lambor Malngiang fo the UDP.

He served as a cabinet miniter for Public Works Department, fisheries and general administration in the First Conrad Sangma ministry. Later, he was shifted to the transport department in 2021.
