= Khasi Hills Autonomous District Council =

Local government body in Meghalaya, northeastern India

Type
- Type: Autonomous District Council

Leadership
- Chair: Strong Pillar Kharjana, VPP
- Chief Executive Member: Winston Lyngdoh, VPP
- Leader of Opposition: Titosstar Well Chyne, UDP

Structure
- Seats: 30 (29 Elected + 1 Nominated)
- Political groups: Executive Council (EC) (17): VPP (17); Opposition (10) MDA (10): UDP (5); NPP (4); HSPDP (1); Others (2): IND (2); Nominated (1): NOM (1)

Elections
- Voting system: First-past-the-post
- Last election: 21 February 2025
- Next election: 2030

Meeting place
- Shillong, Meghalaya

Website
- khadc.nic.in/index.htm

Khasi Hills Autonomous District Council (KHADC) is an autonomous district council in the state of Meghalaya in India. It covers West Khasi Hills district, Eastern West Khasi Hills district, South West Khasi Hills district, East Khasi Hills district and Ri Bhoi district. It is one of the three autonomous district councils within Meghalaya, and one of twenty-five autonomous regions of India. Between its foundation on 27 June 1952 and 14 June 1973 it was known as the United Khasi-Jaintia Hills District Council. The total area of the Khasi Hills Autonomous District Council is 11,718 km^{2} having a population of 1,578,375 as of 2011.

== Members of the Khasi Hills Autonomous District Council ==
| District | Sl. No. | Constituency | Member | Party | Remarks |
|---|---|---|---|---|---|
| Ri Bhoi | 1 | Jirang | Sosthenes Sohtun | National People's Party | |
| Ri Bhoi | 2 | Nongpoh | Rona Khymdeit | National People's Party | |
| Ri Bhoi | 3 | Mawhati | Kynjohlang Rangthong | Voice of the People Party | Deputy Chairman |
| Ri Bhoi | 4 | Umsning | Banrikus Nongstang | Voice of the People Party | |
| Ri Bhoi | 5 | Umroi | Isynei Hinge | Voice of the People Party | Executive Member |
| East Khasi Hills | 6 | Sohryngkham | Bill C Wankhar | Voice of the People Party | |
| East Khasi Hills | 7 | Mawkynrew | Seiborlang Warbah | Voice of the People Party | Executive Member |
| East Khasi Hills | 8 | Nongkrem | Kitbor Syiem | Voice of the People Party | |
| East Khasi Hills | 9 | Lyngkyrdem-Laitkroh | Shemborlang Rynjah | Voice of the People Party | Resigned as CEM |
| East Khasi Hills | 10 | Nongshken | Grace Mary Kharpuri | National People's Party | |
| East Khasi Hills | 11 | Shella | Barikupar Synrem | United Democratic Party | |
| East Khasi Hills | 12 | Mawsynram | Alvin Khyriem Sawkmie | National People's Party | |
| East Khasi Hills | 13 | Sohra | Titosstar Well Chyne | United Democratic Party | Leader Of Opposition |
| East Khasi Hills | 14 | Mylliem | Aibandaplin L Nonglait | Voice of the People Party | Executive Member |
| East Khasi Hills | 15 | Laban-Mawprem | Ricky Shullai | Independent | |
| East Khasi Hills | 16 | Nongthymmai | Winston Tony Lyngdoh | Voice of the People Party | Chief Executive Member |
| East Khasi Hills | 17 | Laitumkhrah-Malki | Deity Majaw | Voice of the People Party | Executive Member |
| East Khasi Hills | 18 | Mawkhar-Pynthorumkhrah | Strong P Kharjana | Voice of the People Party | Chairman |
| East Khasi Hills | 19 | Jaiaw | Denzil R Chen | Voice of the People Party | Executive Member |
| East Khasi Hills | 20 | Mawlai | Eddieson Kharumnuid | Voice of the People Party | |
| East Khasi Hills | 21 | Mawphlang-Diengiei | Lancaster Marbaniang | Voice of the People Party | |
| East Khasi Hills | 22 | Nongspung-Sohiong | Synshar Kupar R Thabah | Independent | |
| West Khasi Hills | 23 | Nongstoin | Dr. Juristman Iawphniaw | Voice of the People Party | |
| West Khasi Hills | 24 | Rambrai-Jyrngam | Lurshai Kharbani | Independent | |
| West Khasi Hills | 25 | Mawshynrut | Srally Rashir | Hill State People's Democratic Party | |
| South West Khasi Hills | 26 | Mawkyrwat | Pynkhrawboklin Kharjahrin | Voice of the People Party | Executive Member |
| South West Khasi Hills | 27 | Langrin | Pius Marwein | United Democratic Party | |
| Eastern West Khasi Hills | 28 | Mairang Nongkhlaw | Equator Nongrang | United Democratic Party | |
| Eastern West Khasi Hills | 29 | Pariong-Mawthadraishan | Powel Sohkhlet | Voice of the People Party | Executive Member |
| | 30 | Nominated | Mathew Kenneth Makdoh | NOM | |

== History ==
The States in the North Eastern Region were reconstituted by the North Eastern Areas (Reorganisation) Act, 1971 and State of Meghalaya was formed comprising (a) the territories which immediately before that day were comprised in the autonomous State of Meghalaya and (b) so much of the territories comprised within the cantonment and municipality of Shillong, as did not form part of that autonomous State. The table appended to paragraph 20 was divided into three parts. Part II of the table covered the tribal areas of the State of Meghalaya as under:

- United Khasi-Jaintia Hills District
- Jowai District
- Garo Hills District

The Governor of Meghalaya altered the names of the United Khasi-Jaintia Hills District as the Khasi Hills District; and the name of the Jowai District as the Jaintia Hills District by notification dated 14-6-19733 issued under paragraph 1 (3)(ff) of the Sixth Schedule.

The paragraph 12A was inserted by the Assam Reorganisation (Meghalaya) Act, 1969 with the formation of autonomous State of Meghalaya within the State of Assam making special provisions with respect to application of laws in Meghalaya. As per sub paragraph 1(a) if the laws made by the District Council under paragraph 3(1)(b) (the management of any forest not being reserved forest) and under paragraph 3(1)(c) (the use of any canal or water course for the purpose of agriculture) is repugnant to any law made by the Assam Legislature "with respect to any project declared by the legislature of that State to be of State importance" then the law made by the District Council to the extent of repugnant shall be void. Sub paragraph 1(b) provided for supremacy of the law made by the Meghalaya Legislature over the laws made by the District Council in matters specified in paragraph 3(1)(b) (the management of any forest not being reserved forest), paragraph 3(1)(c) (the use of any -anal or water course for the purpose of agriculture) and paragraph 3(1) (f) (any other matter relating to village and town administration, including village and town police and public health and sanitation). Sub paragraph (2) and (3) empowered the legislature of Meghalaya to make laws on any subject covered by paragraph (3) if so requested by two or more District Council or Regional Councils in Meghalaya. Under sub paragraph (4), the Governor was given power, with respect to any Act of the Legislature of Assam, and the President was given power, with respect to any Act of Parliament, to issue notification, directing that the any Act will not apply to Meghalaya or shall apply with such exception or modification, as may be specified in the notification, with prospective or retrospective effect.

Paragraph 12A after being substituted by the North Eastern Areas (Reorganisation) Act, 19715 provides that if any law or regulation made by the District or Regional Council under paragraph 3, 8 or 10 is repugnant to the law made by the Meghalaya Legislature, then the law or regulation made by the District or Regional Council, to the extent of repugnancy be void and the law made by the State Legislature shall prevail. With respect to Acts of Parliament, the power of President to issue notification directing that the any Act will not apply to Meghalaya was retained.

== Elections ==
Various elections are as follows:

- 2019 Khasi Hills Autonomous District Council election
- 2025 Khasi Hills Autonomous District Council election

== Structure ==
=== Executive wing ===
Heading the Executive Wing of the ADC is the executive committee whose duties are similar to those of the Cabinet of the State. The head of the executive committee, that is, the Chief Executive Member is elected by majority votes by the Council in Session and such election is to be approved by the Governor of the State. The Chief Executive Member then nominates Members of the executive committee from amongst the members of the council. The executive committee remains in Office as long as they enjoy the majority support of Members of the council.

Departments under the executive committee, Khasi Hills ADC: To administer the various functions as envisaged under the Sixth Schedule, the Khasi Hills Autonomous District Council has created the following Departments:

1. The General Administration Department
2. Law Department
3. The Revenue, Budget and Finance Department
4. Forest Administration Department
5. The Education Department
6. Civil Works and Development Department
7. The Enforcement Department

=== Legislative wing ===
The members of the Council hold regular session once every four months. The Annual Budget of the ADC has to be passed by the majority votes by the Council in session. The other duties of the Council in session are to legislate and enact laws and regulations on such powers as conferred by the Sixth Schedule. Bills on laws and regulations passed by the Council in session are sent to the Governor of the State for his assent or approval.

To run the affairs of the Legislative Secretariat, the Council in session elects a chairman and deputy chairman whose duties are similar to the speaker and the Deputy Speaker of the State Legislature. The Office of the Legislative is looked after by officers and staff headed by the Secretary Legislative.

The Legislative Secretariat looks after the administrative matters pertaining to the legislative functions of the Khasi Hills Autonomous District Council.

=== Judiciary wing ===
Paragraph 4 and 5 of the Sixth Schedule provides for administration of justice in Autonomous areas. Under the above paragraphs, the ADCs are empowered to constitute Courts for trials of cases between parties belonging to Scheduled Tribe Communities. The District Council Court for each district consists of qualified Judicial Officers, designated as Judges and Magistrates who are appointed by the executive committee with the approval of the Governor under The United Khasi-Jaintia Hills District (Administration of Justice) Rules, 1953.

These Rules were made by the United Khasi-Jaintia Hills, District Council, with the previous approval of the Governor in exercise of the power conferred on it by sub para. 4 of paragraph 4 of the Sixth Schedule of the constitution of India and are amended by the Khasi Hills Autonomous District Council from time to time.

Paragraph 5 of the Sixth Schedule provides conferment of powers on the District Council Courts for trial of suits or cases under the CPC and Cr. PC and these Courts have been exercising judicial authority, which have been of great service to the people, where delivery of justice is concerned.

Under The United Khasi-Jaintia Hills District (Administration of Justice) Rules, 1953, three classes of Courts have been provided, namely:-

1. Village Courts
2. Subordinate District Council Courts and the Additional Subordinate District Council Courts.
3. District Council Court and Additional District Council Court.

The above-mentioned courts try all cases at different level when litigation is within the tribal areas and party or parties involved are tribals. They dispense justice in line with the traditional customs and usages at a very speedy, simple and inexpensive manner. Separation of the Judiciary from the Executive is in existence since the Constitution of the Courts. The Judicial Officers of the Courts of the District Council function independently and free from interference by the Executive.

The Judge and Additional Judge of the Courts of the Khasi Hills Autonomous District Council are conferred with powers for the trial of offences punishable with death and transportation for life under the Indian Penal Code or under any other law applicable. The District Council Courts are under the direct supervision of the Hon’ble High Court of Meghalaya. The District Council Courts stands for speedy, cheap and free and fair administration of justice to the people under its jurisdiction.

In so far as Village Courts are concerned, they have been conferred with the power to try petty offences, but the said Courts are not empowered to convict and sentence a person for imprisonment, such other powers like awarding cost etc. are conferred upon such Court. In the same way District Council Courts are also been conferred with certain powers under Chapter III of The Code of Criminal Procedure.

== See also ==
- Hill tribes of Northeast India
- North Eastern Council
