= Nongkrem Assembly constituency =

Legislative Assembly constituency in Meghalaya State, India

Coordinates: 25.5°N 91.89°E

Nongkrem
- Constituency No. 22 for the Meghalaya Legislative Assembly

Constituency details
- Country: India
- Region: Northeast India
- State: Meghalaya
- District: East Khasi Hills
- Lok Sabha constituency: Shillong
- Established: 1972
- Total electors: 38,705
- Reservation: ST

Member of Legislative Assembly
- 11th Meghalaya Legislative Assembly
- Incumbent Ardent Miller Basaiawmoit
- Party: VPP
- Alliance: INDIA
- Elected year: 2023
- Preceded by: Lambor Malngiang; Independent

Nongkrem Legislative Assembly constituency is one of the 60 Legislative Assembly constituencies of Meghalaya state in India.

It is part of East Khasi Hills district and is reserved for candidates belonging to the Scheduled Tribes.

== Members of the Legislative Assembly ==
Year	Member	Party
1972	Radhon S. Lyngdoh	All Party Hill Leaders Conference
1978	Dominic Robun Nongkynrih	Independent politician
1983	Dominic Roblin Nongkynrih	Public Demands Implementation Convention
1988	H. S. Shylla	Indian National Congress
1993	H. S. Shylla	All Party Hill Leaders Conference
1998	Elston Roy Kharkongor	People's Democratic Movement
2003	Lambor Malngiang	Khun Hynniewtrep National Awakening Movement
2008	Ardent Miller Basaiawmoit	United Democratic Party
2013	Ardent Miller Basaiawmoit	Hill State People's Democratic Party
2018	Lambor Malngiang	Independent politician
2023	Ardent Miller Basaiawmoit	Voice of the People Party

== Election results ==
=== Assembly Election 2023 ===
2023 Meghalaya Legislative Assembly election: Nongkrem
Party	Candidate	Votes	%	±%
VPP	Ardent Miller Basaiawmoit	13,286	41.02%	New
UDP	Lambor Malngiang	9,099	28.09%	New
NPP	Dasakhiatbha Lamare	7,491	23.13%	▲12.37
PDF	Egenstar Kurkalang	1,375	4.25%	▼12.08
BJP	David T. Kharkongor	531	1.64%	▼0.95
INC	Sardonik Nongkhlaw	293	0.90%	▼7.13
NOTA	None of the Above	196	0.61%	▲0.03
Margin of victory		4,187	12.93%	▲12.65
Turnout		32,389	83.68%	▼0.73
Registered electors		38,705		▲18.89
VPP gain from Independent		Swing	▲10.91	

=== Assembly Election 2018 ===
2018 Meghalaya Legislative Assembly election: Nongkrem
Party	Candidate	Votes	%	±%
Independent	Lambor Malngiang	8,274	30.11%	New
HSPDP	Ardent Miller Basaiawmoit	8,198	29.83%	▼8.71
PDF	Hilarius Pohchen	4,487	16.33%	New
NPP	Hispreachering Son Shylla	2,956	10.76%	New
INC	John Filmore Kharshiing	2,207	8.03%	▼21.57
BJP	Egenstar Kurkalang	713	2.59%	▲1.78
Independent	Masterson Kharbyngar	204	0.74%	New
NOTA	None of the Above	157	0.57%	New
Margin of victory		76	0.28%	▼8.66
Turnout		27,482	84.41%	▲0.04
Registered electors		32,556		▲23.30
Independent gain from HSPDP		Swing	▼8.43	

=== Assembly Election 2013 ===
2013 Meghalaya Legislative Assembly election: Nongkrem
Party	Candidate	Votes	%	±%
HSPDP	Ardent Miller Basaiawmoit	8,585	38.54%	New
INC	Lambor Malngiang	6,595	29.60%	▲16.64
Independent	Hilarius Pohchen	4,976	22.34%	New
UDP	Draison Kharshiing	1,711	7.68%	▼16.13
Independent	Elston Roy Kharkongor	230	1.03%	New
BJP	Fairly Bert Kharrngi	181	0.81%	New
Margin of victory		1,990	8.93%	▲5.41
Turnout		22,278	84.37%	▼5.87
Registered electors		26,404		▲17.10
HSPDP gain from UDP		Swing	▲14.73	

=== Assembly Election 2008 ===
2008 Meghalaya Legislative Assembly election: Nongkrem
Party	Candidate	Votes	%	±%
UDP	Ardent Miller Basaiawmoit	4,845	23.81%	▲5.49
KHNAM	Lambor Malngiang	4,128	20.29%	▲1.44
Independent	Hispreachering Son Shylla	3,299	16.21%	New
NCP	Hilarius Pohchen	3,131	15.39%	New
INC	Waibha Khyriem Kyndiah	2,638	12.96%	▲1.25
MDP	Mitchel Wankhar	2,308	11.34%	▲3.52
Margin of victory		717	3.52%	▲3.00
Turnout		20,349	90.24%	▲18.78
Registered electors		22,549		▲3.68
UDP gain from KHNAM		Swing	▲4.96	

=== Assembly Election 2003 ===
2003 Meghalaya Legislative Assembly election: Nongkrem
Party	Candidate	Votes	%	±%
KHNAM	Lambor Malngiang	2,929	18.85%	New
UDP	H. S. Shylla	2,847	18.32%	▲3.87
Independent	Sanbor Shullai	1,977	12.72%	New
INC	Waibha Khyriem Kyndiah	1,821	11.72%	▼0.72
Independent	Ardent Miller Basaiawmoit	1,346	8.66%	New
PDM	Elston Roy Kharkongor	1,306	8.40%	▼13.12
MDP	Hilarius Warbah	1,216	7.82%	New
Margin of victory		82	0.53%	▼6.54
Turnout		15,541	71.46%	▼1.97
Registered electors		21,748		▲14.48
KHNAM gain from PDM		Swing	▼2.67	

=== Assembly Election 1998 ===
1998 Meghalaya Legislative Assembly election: Nongkrem
Party	Candidate	Votes	%	±%
PDM	Elston Roy Kharkongor	3,002	21.52%	New
UDP	John Filmore Kharshiing	2,016	14.45%	New
Independent	Kynsai Manik Syiem	1,932	13.85%	New
INC	Tourist Syiem	1,735	12.44%	▲7.65
Independent	Chandra L. Nongbri	1,214	8.70%	New
Independent	Latho Manik Syiem	1,094	7.84%	New
Independent	Edarstar Lyngdoh Nongbri M	864	6.19%	New
Margin of victory		986	7.07%	▲5.18
Turnout		13,950	75.74%	▼9.57
Registered electors		18,998		▲4.51
PDM gain from AHL(AM)		Swing	▼11.42	

=== Assembly Election 1993 ===
1993 Meghalaya Legislative Assembly election: Nongkrem
Party	Candidate	Votes	%	±%
AHL(AM)	H. S. Shylla	4,970	32.94%	New
HPU	Robert Kharshing	4,685	31.05%	▲4.21
PDC	Elston Roy Kharkongor	3,347	22.18%	▼5.42
Independent	Iohbor M. Syiem	760	5.04%	New
INC	Roysterwell Lyngdoh	722	4.79%	▼27.50
Independent	Rana Kharkongor	457	3.03%	New
BJP	Suba Sing Syiem	147	0.97%	New
Margin of victory		285	1.89%	▼2.79
Turnout		15,088	84.06%	▲1.63
Registered electors		18,179		▲26.38
AHL(AM) gain from INC		Swing	▲0.65	

=== Assembly Election 1988 ===
1988 Meghalaya Legislative Assembly election: Nongkrem
Party	Candidate	Votes	%	±%
INC	H. S. Shylla	3,779	32.29%	▲24.93
PDC	Dominic Robun Nongkynrih	3,231	27.61%	▼4.74
HPU	Radhon S. Lyngdoh	3,141	26.84%	New
HSPDP	E.B.S. Kharrngi	1,399	11.95%	▲5.72
Independent	Long Singh Wankhar	154	1.32%	New
Margin of victory		548	4.68%	▼1.16
Turnout		11,704	82.79%	▲3.88
Registered electors		14,384		▲24.36
INC gain from PDC		Swing	▼0.06	

=== Assembly Election 1983 ===
1983 Meghalaya Legislative Assembly election: Nongkrem
Party	Candidate	Votes	%	±%
PDC	Dominic Roblin Nongkynrih	2,899	32.35%	New
Independent	Hispreachering Son Shylla	2,375	26.50%	New
Independent	Elstonroy Kharkongor	860	9.60%	New
INC	Kelvister Kharbuli	659	7.35%	▼4.57
APHLC	Hikeswel Lyngdoh	611	6.82%	▼18.26
Independent	Drosswell Mylliemngap	571	6.37%	New
HSPDP	Kynsai Manik Syiem	559	6.24%	▲3.17
Margin of victory		524	5.85%	▼29.02
Turnout		8,962	80.65%	▲7.37
Registered electors		11,566		▲12.40
PDC gain from Independent		Swing	▼27.60	

=== Assembly Election 1978 ===
1978 Meghalaya Legislative Assembly election: Nongkrem
Party	Candidate	Votes	%	±%
Independent	Dominic Robun Nongkynrih	4,325	59.94%	New
APHLC	Radhon S. Lyngdoh	1,809	25.07%	▼57.07
INC	Grayneson Mawthoh	860	11.92%	New
HSPDP	Honiwell Chyne	221	3.06%	New
Margin of victory		2,516	34.87%	▼32.28
Turnout		7,215	71.51%	▲16.90
Registered electors		10,290		▲54.25
Independent gain from APHLC		Swing	▼22.20	

=== Assembly Election 1972 ===
1972 Meghalaya Legislative Assembly election: Nongkrem
Party	Candidate	Votes	%	±%
APHLC	Radhon S. Lyngdoh	2,916	82.14%	New
Independent	Resida Sohtun	532	14.99%	New
Independent	Dominic Robun Nongkynrih	102	2.87%	New
Margin of victory		2,384	67.15%	
Turnout		3,550	54.22%	
Registered electors		6,671		
APHLC win (new seat)				

== See also ==
- List of constituencies of the Meghalaya Legislative Assembly
- East Khasi Hills district
