= Mawhati Assembly constituency =

Legislative Assembly constituency in Meghalaya State, India

Coordinates: 25.82°N 92.09°E

Mawhati
- Constituency No. 8 for the Meghalaya Legislative Assembly

Constituency details
- Country: India
- Region: Northeast India
- State: Meghalaya
- District: Ri Bhoi
- Lok Sabha constituency: Shillong
- Established: 1972
- Total electors: 39,235
- Reservation: ST

Member of Legislative Assembly
- 11th Meghalaya Legislative Assembly
- Incumbent Charles Marngar
- Party: NPP
- Alliance: NDA
- Elected year: 2023

Mawhati is one of the 60 Legislative Assembly constituencies of Meghalaya state in India. It is part of Ri Bhoi district and is reserved for candidates belonging to the Scheduled Tribes. It falls under Shillong Lok Sabha constituency and its current MLA is Charles Marngar of the National People's Party.

== Members of the Legislative Assembly ==
Election	Member	Party
1972	Martin Narayan Majaw	Independent politician
1978	Martin N. Majaw	Independent politician
1983	S. R. Moksha	Hill State People's Democratic Party
1988	S. R. Moksha	Hill People's Union
1993	S. R. Moksha	Hill People's Union
1998	Phingwel Muktieh	Indian National Congress
2003	Phingwel Muktieh	Indian National Congress
2008	Donbok Khymdeit	United Democratic Party
2013	Julias Kitbok Dorphang	Independent politician
2018	Dasakhiatbha Lamare	National People's Party
2023	Charles Marngar	National People's Party

== Election results ==
=== Assembly Election 2023 ===
2023 Meghalaya Legislative Assembly election: Mawhati
Party	Candidate	Votes	%	±%
INC	Charles Marngar	13,273	37.58%	▲24.69
NPP	Shemphang Lyngdoh	8,029	22.73%	▲0.42
UDP	Baiahunlang Makdoh	6,556	18.56%	▲6.76
HSPDP	Evalyni Kharbani	4,590	13.00%	New
BJP	Dr. Evarist Myrsing	1,376	3.90%	▲0.46
AITC	Dr. Saralin Dorphang	729	2.06%	New
PDF	Roswel Shadap	560	1.59%	▼13.54
NOTA	None of the Above	191	0.54%	▼0.57
Margin of victory		5,244	14.85%	▲14.13
Turnout		35,321	90.02%	▲0.94
Registered electors		39,235		▲22.54
INC gain from NPP		Swing	▲15.26	

=== Assembly Election 2018 ===
2018 Meghalaya Legislative Assembly election: Mawhati
Party	Candidate	Votes	%	±%
NPP	Dasakhiatbha Lamare	6,365	22.32%	New
Independent	Julias Kitbok Dorphang	6,161	21.60%	New
PDF	James Sylliang	4,314	15.12%	New
INC	Charles Marngar	3,675	12.88%	▼16.81
UDP	Donbok Khymdeit	3,367	11.80%	▼18.88
Independent	Evalyni Kharbani	2,231	7.82%	New
BJP	Banbuhaiing Makdoh	980	3.44%	New
NOTA	None of the Above	316	1.11%	New
Margin of victory		204	0.72%	▼4.30
Turnout		28,523	89.09%	▼2.40
Registered electors		32,017		▲26.83
NPP gain from Independent		Swing	▼13.39	

=== Assembly Election 2013 ===
2013 Meghalaya Legislative Assembly election: Mawhati
Party	Candidate	Votes	%	±%
Independent	Julias Kitbok Dorphang	8,246	35.70%	New
UDP	Donbok Khymdeit	7,087	30.69%	▼0.12
INC	Phingwel Muktieh	6,857	29.69%	▲0.84
Independent	Plas Mukhim	508	2.20%	New
LJP	Kyrshanlang Nongshli	233	1.01%	New
HSPDP	Hopingstone Masharing	164	0.71%	New
Margin of victory		1,159	5.02%	▲3.07
Turnout		23,095	91.48%	▼1.72
Registered electors		25,245		▲18.58
Independent gain from UDP		Swing	▲4.90	

=== Assembly Election 2008 ===
2008 Meghalaya Legislative Assembly election: Mawhati
Party	Candidate	Votes	%	±%
UDP	Donbok Khymdeit	6,112	30.80%	▲0.61
INC	Phingwel Muktieh	5,725	28.85%	▼6.65
KHNAM	Rangkynsai Makdoh	4,390	22.12%	▲14.47
NCP	Clement Shadap	3,344	16.85%	▼9.80
MDP	Heronice Masharing	271	1.37%	New
Margin of victory		387	1.95%	▼3.36
Turnout		19,842	93.20%	▲21.11
Registered electors		21,289		▲8.52
UDP gain from INC		Swing	▼4.70	

=== Assembly Election 2003 ===
2003 Meghalaya Legislative Assembly election: Mawhati
Party	Candidate	Votes	%	±%
INC	Phingwel Muktieh	5,021	35.50%	▲7.10
UDP	S. R. Moksha	4,270	30.19%	▲8.03
NCP	Dr. Jerin Syiem	3,770	26.66%	New
KHNAM	Murmanik Syiem	1,082	7.65%	New
Margin of victory		751	5.31%	▲0.29
Turnout		14,143	72.14%	▼5.38
Registered electors		19,618		▲9.52
INC hold		Swing	▲7.10	

=== Assembly Election 1998 ===
1998 Meghalaya Legislative Assembly election: Mawhati
Party	Candidate	Votes	%	±%
INC	Phingwel Muktieh	3,941	28.40%	▼8.22
Independent	Rangkynsai Makdoh	3,245	23.38%	New
UDP	S. R. Moksha	3,075	22.16%	New
HSPDP	Clement Shadap	1,755	12.65%	New
PDM	Martin Lyngdoh	1,603	11.55%	New
CPI	Marius Nongrum	143	1.03%	New
BJP	Howard Moksha	115	0.83%	New
Margin of victory		696	5.02%	▲3.19
Turnout		13,877	80.85%	▼5.14
Registered electors		17,912		▲13.48
INC gain from HPU		Swing	▼10.05	

=== Assembly Election 1993 ===
1993 Meghalaya Legislative Assembly election: Mawhati
Party	Candidate	Votes	%	±%
HPU	S. R. Moksha	5,013	38.45%	▲1.63
INC	Rangkynsai Makdoh	4,775	36.62%	▲17.98
AHL(AM)	Clement Shadap	2,567	19.69%	New
JP	Shambok M. Khymdeit	541	4.15%	New
Janata Dal (B)	Michael S. Kharsingh	143	1.10%	New
Margin of victory		238	1.83%	▼8.58
Turnout		13,039	84.81%	▲6.78
Registered electors		15,784		▲24.13
HPU hold		Swing	▲1.63	

=== Assembly Election 1988 ===
1988 Meghalaya Legislative Assembly election: Mawhati
Party	Candidate	Votes	%	±%
HPU	S. R. Moksha	3,550	36.81%	New
Independent	Martin N. Majaw	2,547	26.41%	New
INC	Joseph Joit Makdoh	1,798	18.65%	▲14.56
HSPDP	Clement Shadap	1,723	17.87%	▼41.16
CPI	Orister Syngkli	25	0.26%	New
Margin of victory		1,003	10.40%	▼13.35
Turnout		9,643	78.85%	▲8.58
Registered electors		12,716		▲19.75
HPU gain from HSPDP		Swing	▼22.22	

=== Assembly Election 1983 ===
1983 Meghalaya Legislative Assembly election: Mawhati
Party	Candidate	Votes	%	±%
HSPDP	S. R. Moksha	4,216	59.03%	▲27.66
PDC	Martin N. Majaw	2,520	35.28%	New
INC	Matsingh Kharkongor	292	4.09%	▼13.33
APHLC	Stanly Lapang	114	1.60%	▼4.50
Margin of victory		1,696	23.75%	▲15.02
Turnout		7,142	71.68%	▲5.81
Registered electors		10,619		▲8.46
HSPDP gain from Independent		Swing	▲18.94	

=== Assembly Election 1978 ===
1978 Meghalaya Legislative Assembly election: Mawhati
Party	Candidate	Votes	%	±%
Independent	Martin N. Majaw	2,412	40.09%	New
HSPDP	S. R. Moksha	1,887	31.37%	New
INC	J. C. Makhod	1,048	17.42%	New
APHLC	Betterson Kharkongor	367	6.10%	▼12.02
Independent	Odwiss Khymdeit	302	5.02%	New
Margin of victory		525	8.73%	▼5.86
Turnout		6,016	64.33%	▲11.31
Registered electors		9,791		▲11.02
Independent hold		Swing	▲5.69	

=== Assembly Election 1972 ===
1972 Meghalaya Legislative Assembly election: Mawhati
Party	Candidate	Votes	%	±%
Independent	Martin Narayan Majaw	1,521	34.40%	New
Independent	S. R. Moksha	876	19.81%	New
APHLC	Walter Roy Marng	801	18.12%	New
Independent	Nilip Shadap	536	12.12%	New
Independent	Min Shallam	295	6.67%	New
Independent	Odwys Khyndeit	199	4.50%	New
Independent	Linshon Roy Lapang	102	2.31%	New
Margin of victory		645	14.59%	
Turnout		4,421	52.82%	
Registered electors		8,819		
Independent win (new seat)				

== See also ==
- List of constituencies of the Meghalaya Legislative Assembly
- Ri Bhoi district
- Shillong (Lok Sabha constituency)
