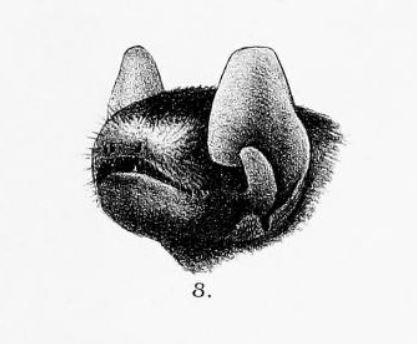
- Glischropus tylopus

Scientific classification
- Kingdom: Animalia
- Phylum: Chordata
- Class: Mammalia
- Infraclass: Placentalia
- Order: Chiroptera
- Family: Vespertilionidae
- Subfamily: Vespertilioninae
- Tribe: Pipistrellini
- Genus: Glischropus; Dobson, 1875

Type species
- Vesperugo tylopus

Species
- Glischropus aquilis Glischropus bucephalus Glischropus javanus Glischropus tylopus Glischropus meghalayanus

= Glischropus =

Genus of bats

Glischropus is a genus of bats within the vesper bat family, Vespertilionidae. Species within this genus are:

- Glischropus aquilus (Görföl, Wiantoro, Kingston, Bates & Huang, 2015) — dark thick-thumbed bat
- Glischropus bucephalus.
- Glischropus javanus Chasen, 1939 — Javan thick-thumbed bat
- Glischropus tylopus (Dobson, 1875) — common thick-thumbed bat
  - G. t. tylopus
  - G. t. batjanus
- Glischropus meghalayanus (Saikia, Ruedi, Csorba, 2022) — Meghalaya thick-thumbed bat
