= 2025 Khasi Hills Autonomous District Council election =

Municipal election in Meghalaya, India

- 21 February 2025

29 out of 30 seats in the Khasi Hills Autonomous District Council 15 seats needed for a majority
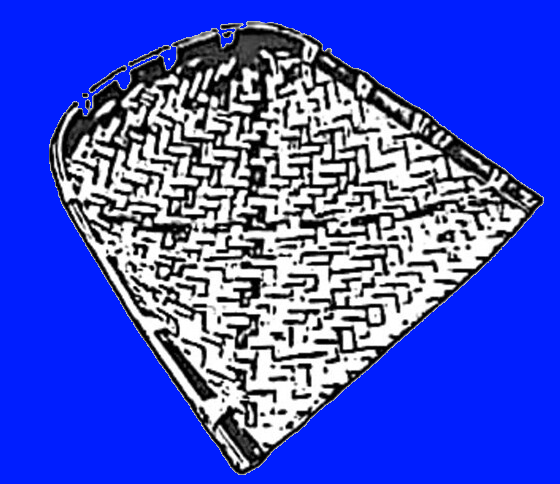

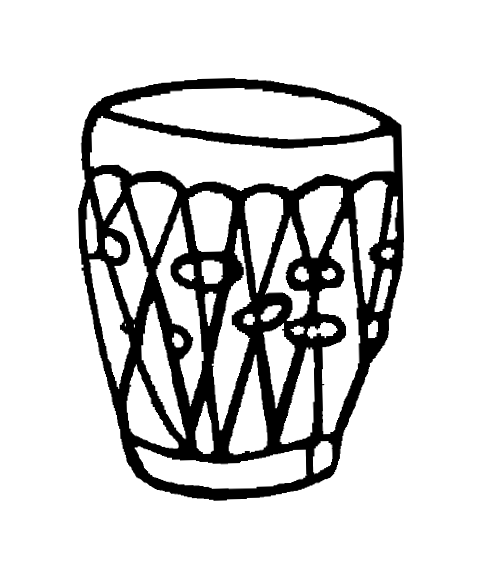

	First party	Second party	Third party
Party	VPP	UDP	NPP
Last election	0	6	7
Seats won	17	5	4
Seat change	▲17	▼1	▼3
	Fourth party	Fifth party	Sixth party
Party	Independents	HSPDP	INC
Last election	0	3	10
Seats won	2	1	0
Seat change	▲2	▼2	▼10
Chief executive member before election
Teinwell Dkhar
UDP
Chief executive member
Strong Pillar Kharjana
VPP

Elections to the Khasi Hills Autonomous District Council (KHADC) were held on 21 February 2025. Of the 30 seats, 29 seats were open for election and one remaining seat is nominated.

The VPP won majority by winning 17 seats.

== Overview ==
About 158 candidates including 12 women participated in the election. The voter turnout was 76.77%. The highest voter turnout was recorded at Sohiong constituency (86.06%) and the lowest at Jirang (51.46%).

== Results ==
The VPP won majority seats. The state ruling party NPP won 4 seats. The UDP won five seats, HSPDP won one seat, and two Independents won. The Congress party which earlier formed majority has drawn a blank.

VPP members Strong Pillar Kharjana and Winston Lyngdoh were elected unopposed as the new chairman and Chief Executive Member of the council respectively.
