= Pynursla Assembly constituency =

Legislative Assembly constituency in Meghalaya State, India

Coordinates: 25.31°N 91.9°E

Pynursla
- Constituency No. 27 for the Meghalaya Legislative Assembly

Constituency details
- Country: India
- Region: Northeast India
- State: Meghalaya
- District: East Khasi Hills
- Lok Sabha constituency: Shillong
- Established: 2008
- Total electors: 38,907
- Reservation: ST

Member of Legislative Assembly
- 11th Meghalaya Legislative Assembly
- Incumbent Prestone Tynsong
- Party: NPP
- Alliance: NDA
- Elected year: 2023

Pynursla is one of the 60 Legislative Assembly constituencies of Meghalaya state in India. It was created after the passing of the Delimitation of Parliamentary and Assembly Constituencies Order, 2008 and had its first election in 2013. It is part of East Khasi Hills district and is reserved for candidates belonging to the Scheduled Tribes. As of 2023 it is represented by Prestone Tynsong of the National People's Party.

== Members of the Legislative Assembly ==
Election	Name	Party
2013	Prestone Tynsong	Indian National Congress
2018	Prestone Tynsong	National People's Party
2023	Prestone Tynsong	National People's Party

== Election results ==
=== Assembly Election 2023 ===
2023 Meghalaya Legislative Assembly election: Pynursla
Party	Candidate	Votes	%	±%
NPP	Prestone Tynsong	13,745	39.70%	▼2.45
INC	Nehru Suting	5,605	16.19%	▲12.44
UDP	Anthony Justine Kongwang	5,377	15.53%	▼18.15
Independent	Don Kupar Massar	4,828	13.95%	New
VPP	Manbhalang Thabah	3,482	10.06%	New
AITC	Edmund Khongngai	1,204	3.48%	New
BJP	Rowelly Khongsni	377	1.09%	▼0.08
NOTA	None of the Above	148	0.43%	▼0.26
Margin of victory		8,140	23.51%	▲15.04
Turnout		34,618	88.98%	▼2.55
Registered electors		38,907		▲17.20
NPP hold		Swing	▼2.45	

=== Assembly Election 2018 ===
2018 Meghalaya Legislative Assembly election: Pynursla
Party	Candidate	Votes	%	±%
NPP	Prestone Tynsong	12,807	42.15%	New
UDP	Nehru Suting	10,233	33.68%	▲2.90
PDF	Grace Mary Kharpuri	5,295	17.43%	New
INC	Dr. Jelington Ryngdong	1,141	3.76%	▼42.30
BJP	Banteilang Singh Rumnong	355	1.17%	New
AAP	Denis Tynsiar	199	0.65%	New
NOTA	None of the Above	208	0.68%	New
Margin of victory		2,574	8.47%	▼6.81
Turnout		30,383	91.53%	▼1.72
Registered electors		33,196		▲16.37
NPP gain from INC		Swing	▼3.90	

=== Assembly Election 2013 ===
2013 Meghalaya Legislative Assembly election: Pynursla
Party	Candidate	Votes	%	±%
INC	Prestone Tynsong	12,251	46.06%	New
UDP	Banalari Khongwar	8,187	30.78%	New
Independent	Don Kupar Massar	6,162	23.17%	New
Margin of victory		4,064	15.28%	
Turnout		26,600	93.24%	
Registered electors		28,527		
INC win (new seat)				

== See also ==
- List of constituencies of the Meghalaya Legislative Assembly
- East Khasi Hills district
