= Disk-footed bat =

Conservation status
- Least Concern (IUCN 3.1)

Scientific classification
- Kingdom: Animalia
- Phylum: Chordata
- Class: Mammalia
- Infraclass: Placentalia
- Order: Chiroptera
- Family: Vespertilionidae
- Subfamily: Myotinae
- Genus: Eudiscopus; Conisbee, 1953
- Species: E. denticulus

Binomial name
- Eudiscopus denticulus (Osgood, 1932)
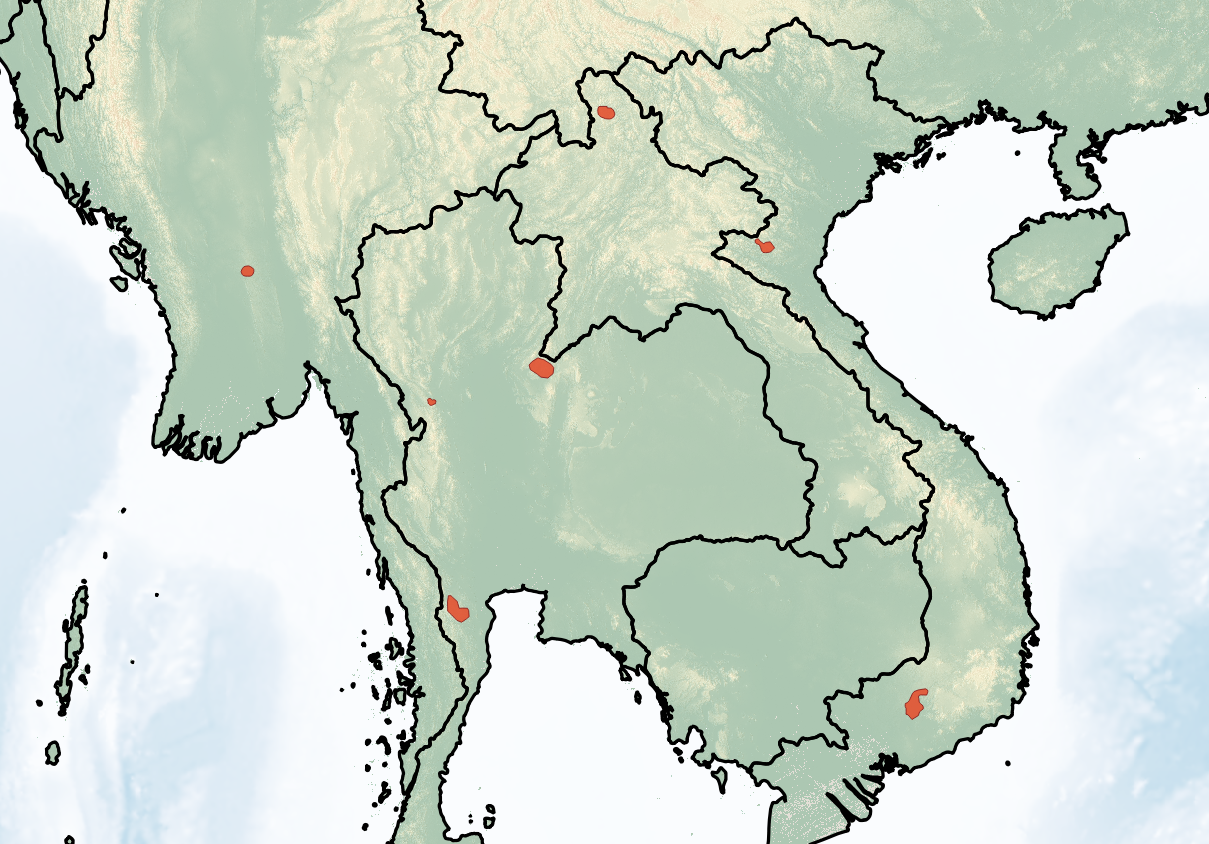

Species of bat

The disk-footed bat (Eudiscopus denticulus) is a species of vesper bat in the Vespertilionidae family found in Laos, Myanmar, Thailand and Vietnam. The disc-footed bat was recorded in 2021 in the Lailad area of the northeastern Indian state of Meghalaya, near the Nongkhyllem Wildlife Sanctuary. It is about 1000 km west of the bat's nearest known habitat, Myanmar.

Phylogenetic analysis supports it being a basal member of Myotinae, which also contains the well-known, cosmopolitan genus Myotis.
