= Constantine Lyngdoh =

Indian politician (1956–2019)

Constantine Lyngdoh was an Indian politician of the Hill State People's Democratic Party from Meghalaya. He was elected in the 1993 Meghalaya Legislative Assembly election from the Nongpoh constituency as a candidate of the Hill State People's Democratic Party, where he defeated Chief Minister of Meghalaya D. D. Lapang.
