= Lambor Malngiang =

Indian politician

Lambor Malngiang (born 1979) is an Indian politician from Meghalaya. He is a former two time member of the Meghalaya Legislative Assembly from the Nongkrem Assembly constituency which is reserved for the Scheduled Tribe community in the East Khasi Hills district. He represented the Khun Hynniewtrep National Awakening Movement in 2003 and was later elected as an independent politician in 2018.

== Early life ==
Malngiang is from Laitkor Nongdaneng, East Khasi Hills district, Meghalaya. He is the son of Dike Rynjah. He completed his B.Sc. at a college affiliated with Bangalore University in 1996. He served as a member of the district council.He declared assets worth Rs.94 lakhs in 2018 and Rs.20 lakhs in 2023, in his affidavits with the Election Commission of India.

== Career ==
Malngiang won from the Nongkrem Assembly constituency in the 2003 Meghalaya Legislative Assembly election representing the Khun Hynniewtrep National Awakening Movement. He polled 2,929 votes and defeated his nearest rival, H. S. Shylla of the United Democratic Party (Meghalaya), by 82 votes. He contested again on the KHNAM ticket in the 2008 Meghalaya Legislative Assembly election and garnered 4,845 votes but lost to Ardent Miller Basaiawmoit of the United Democratic Party (Meghalaya) by 717 votes. He later joined the Indian National Congress and contested the 2013 election on the Congress ticket but lost again to Ardent Basaiawmoit, who contested this time on HSPDP ticket, and lost by 1990 votes.

He regained the seat winning the Nongkrem seat in the 2018 Meghalaya Legislative Assembly election where he polled 8,274 votes and beat his closest opponent and sitting MLA from HSPDP, Ardent Basaiawmoit, by 76 votes. However, he lost to Ardent Basalawmoit again in the 2023 Meghalaya Legislative Assembly election.

In November 2026, he joined the National People's Party.
