= Umling =

- Village
- Location of Umling in Meghalaya Umling (India) Umling (Asia)
- Coordinates: 25.971°N 91.858°E
- Country: India
- State: Meghalaya
- District: Ri Bhoi

Population (2011)
  - Total: 1,296

Language
  - Official: Bhoi, Khasi
- Time zone: UTC+5:30 (IST)
- Vehicle registration: ML

Umling is a village in Ri-Bhoi district, Meghalaya, India.

== See also ==
- Ri-Bhoi district
