= Narpuh Wildlife Sanctuary =

Wildlife Sanctuary in Meghalaya

- IUCN category IV (habitat/species management area)
- Location within Meghalaya Location within India
- Interactive map of Narpuh Wildlife Sanctuary
- Location: East Jaintia Hills district, Meghalaya, India
- Nearest city: Jowai
- Coordinates: 25.105389°N 92.437997°E
- Area: 59.90 km^{2} (23.13 sq mi)
- Established: 10 June 2014
- Governing body: Forest & Environment Department, Government of Meghalaya

Narpuh Wildlife Sanctuary is a wildlife sanctuary in the East Jaintia Hills district of the Indian state of Meghalaya. Notified in 2014, it protects a significant tract of semi-evergreen and evergreen forest in the Jaintia Hills and is important for several threatened species found in north-east India.

== Geography ==
Narpuh Wildlife Sanctuary covers approximately 59.90 km² and lies in the southern part of the Jaintia Hills landscape. The sanctuary contains hilly terrain with evergreen and semi-evergreen forest types and perennial streams that form important catchments for local rivers. The sanctuary boundary and the official eco-sensitive zone (ESZ) are described in the Government of India notification for the ESZ; the ESZ around Narpuh extends beyond the sanctuary and covers a broader area as per the notification.

== Biodiversity ==
The sanctuary is noted for its floral diversity and for fauna typical of the north-eastern hill forests. Species reported from the sanctuary and surrounding landscape include primates such as the western hoolock gibbon, sambar, barking deer, and a rich bird assemblage including hornbills and other forest birds.

== Conservation and threats ==
Regional media and local conservation commentary have reported threats such as illegal logging, shifting cultivation and pressure from nearby settlements.

It was rated as "Good" in the Wildlife Institute of India's Management Effectiveness Evaluation (MEE) 2020-25 report.

== See also ==
- Tawi Wildlife Sanctuary
- Nongkhyllem Wildlife Sanctuary
