= 2019 Khasi Hills Autonomous District Council election =

2019 municipal election in Meghalaya, India

- 27 February 2019

29 out of 30 seats in the Khasi Hills Autonomous District Council 15 seats needed for a majority

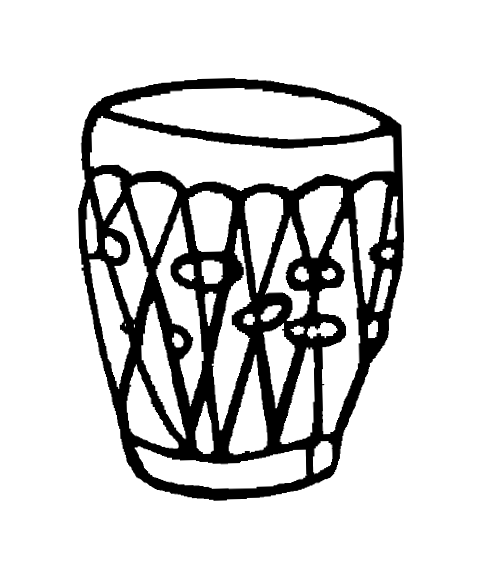

	First party	Second party	Third party
Party	INC	NPP	UDP
Seats won	10	7	6
	Fourth party	Fifth party	Sixth party
Party	HSPDP	PDF	KHNAM
Seats won	2	1	0
Chief executive member
Teinwell Dkhar
UDP

Elections to the Khasi Hills Autonomous District Council (KHADC) were held on 27 February 2019. The votes were counted on 2 March 2019 with the Indian National Congress emerging as the largest party in the council with 10 seats while the NPP and its ally UDP emerged as the ruling coalition with 7 and 6 seats respectively.

== Schedule ==
Election Event	Date	Time	Day
Last date for filing nomination	07/02/2019	Before 3:00 pm	Thursday
Scrutiny of nomination	08/02/2019	After 3:00 pm	Friday
Last date of withdrawal of candidature	09/02/2019		Saturday
Date of polling	27/02/2019		Wednesday
Date of counting	02/03/2019		Saturday

== Results ==
The counting was held on 2 March 2019. The INC emerged single largest party by winning 10 seats.

=== By Party ===
Party	Popular vote		Seats		
Party	Vote	%	Contested	Won	+/-
Indian National Congress (INC)				10	
National People's Party (NPP)				7	
United Democratic Party (UDP)				6	
Hill State People's Democratic Party (HSPDP)				2	
People's Democratic Front (Meghalaya) (PDF)				1	
Khun Hynniewtrep National Awakening Movement (KHNAM)				0	
Independent (IND)				3	
None of the above (NOTA)			N/A		
Total			131	29	N/A

=== By Constituency ===
No.	Constituency	Winner	Party	Margin
1	Jirang	Victor Ranee	NPP	
2	Nongpoh	Balajied Ranee	INC	
3	Mawhati	Charles Marngar	INC	
4	Umsning	Macdalyn Sawkmie Mawlong	PDF	
5	Umroi	Rangkynsai Kharbuki	NPP	
6	Sohryngkham	Pyniaidsing Syiem	NPP	
7	Mawkynrew	Martle N. Mukhim	HSPDP	
8	Nongkrem	Lambor Malngiang	IND	
9	Lyngkyrdem-Laitkroh	Ryngkatlang Lyndem	United Democratic Party (Meghalaya)	
10	Nongshken	Grace Mary Kharpuri	INC	
11	Shella	Teinwell Dkhar	United Democratic Party (Meghalaya)	
12	Mawsynram	Alvin Khyriem Sawkmie	NPP	
13	Sohra	Titosstar Well Chyne	United Democratic Party (Meghalaya)	
14	Mylliem	Ronnie V. Lyngdoh	INC	
15	Laban-Mawprem	Mitchel Wankhar	NPP	
16	Nongthymmai	Latiplang Kharkongor	INC	
17	Laitumkhrah-Malki	Fantin Joseph Lakadong	INC	
18	Mawkhar-Pynthorumkhrah	Pynshngainlang Syiem	NPP	
19	Jaiaw	Paul Lyngdoh	United Democratic Party (Meghalaya)	
20	Mawlai	Teibor Pathaw	IND	
21	Mawphlang-Diengiei	Lamphrang Blah	INC	
22	Nongspung-Sohiong	Sherborlang Mawlong	HSPDP	
23	Mairang-Nongkhlaw	Batskhem Ryntathiang	INC	
24	Pariong-Mawthadraishan	Jambor War	United Democratic Party (Meghalaya)	
25	Mawkyrwat	Carness Sohshang	INC	
26	Langrin	Nasar Marwein	United Democratic Party (Meghalaya)	
27	Nongstoin	Gabriel Wahlang	INC	
28	Rambrai-Jyrngam	Bajop Pyngrope	INC	
29	Mawshynrut	Gigur Myrthong	NPP	

== Members of the Executive Committee ==
The list of the Executive members are as follows:

	Executive Member	Portfolio
1.	Titosstarwell Chyne; Chief Executive Member	General Administration, Posting & Transfer, Establishment, Land, Law & Legal Matters, Appointment; any other matter(s) not allotted to any Members
2.	Gigur Myrthong; Deputy Chief Executive Member	Finance, Planning, Mines & Minerals
3.	Martle N. Mukhim	Development; Education
4.	Grace Mary Kharpuri	Market (Council Market & Other Market), Information and Technology
5.	Victor Ranee	Arts & Culture, Health & Sanitation; Labour clearance Certificate
6.	Paul Lyngdoh	Taxation, Town Committees, Building Bye Laws; Sports & Youth Affairs
7.	Jambor War	Elaka Administration
8.	Rangkynsai Kharbuki	Trade; Water Resources
9.	Teiborlang Pathaw	Council Building including Council Assets; Enforcement
10.	Mitchel Wankhar	Revenue Collection; Fisheries
11.	Macdalyn Sawkmie Mawlong	Forest; Marriage & Divorce
