= Charles Marngar =

Indian politician

Member of the Meghalaya Legislative Assembly
- Incumbent
- Assumed office 2023
- Preceded by: Dasakhiatbha Lamare
- Constituency: Mawhati

Personal details
- Born: Meghalaya, India
- Party: National People's Party

Charles Marngar is an Indian politician from Meghalaya. He serves as a member of the Meghalaya Legislative Assembly representing Mawhati. He belongs to the National People's Party.
