= Javan thick-thumbed bat =

Conservation status
- Data Deficient (IUCN 3.1)

Scientific classification
- Kingdom: Animalia
- Phylum: Chordata
- Class: Mammalia
- Order: Chiroptera
- Family: Vespertilionidae
- Genus: Glischropus
- Species: G. javanus

Binomial name
- Glischropus javanus Chasen, 1939

Species of bat

The Javan thick-thumbed bat (Glischropus javanus) is a species of vesper bat. It can be found in Indonesia.
