= Process T. Sawkmie =

Indian politician

Process T. Sawkmie (born 25 November 1963) is an Indian politician from Meghalaya. He is a three time former member of the Meghalaya Legislative Assembly from the Mawlai Assembly constituency, which is reserved for the Scheduled Tribe community, in the East Khasi Hills district. He was elected on a United Democratic Party ticket in 1998 and retained the seat in 2003 as a Meghalaya Democratic Party candidate. He regained the seat in 2018 on Indian National Congress ticket.

== Early life ==
Sawkmie is from Mawlai, East Khasi Hills district, Meghalaya. He is the son of the late Trespin Roy Skhemiew. He completed his B.Com. at St. Anthonys College, Shillong which is affiliated with North-Eastern Hill University in 1989. He declared assets worth Rs.1 crore in 2013 and also in 2023, in his affidavits to the Election Commission of India.

== Career ==
Sawkmie first became an MLA winning from the Mawlai Assembly constituency in the 1998 Meghalaya Legislative Assembly election representing the United Democratic Party (Meghalaya). He polled 7,723 votes and defeated his nearest rival, Founder Strong Cajee of the People's Democratic Movement (Meghalaya), by 678 votes. He later changed party, but retained his seat in the 2013 Meghalaya Legislative Assembly election on Meghalaya Democratic Party ticket. In 2003, he garnered 8,031 votes and beat his closest opponent, Founder Strong Cajee of the PDM, by 1,782 votes. In the 2008 election, he lost to Founder Cajee, who contested this time on a Congress ticket. In 2013, he moved to Pynthorumkhrah Assembly constituency and contested as an independent candidate but lost to Alexander Laloo Hek of the Indian National Congress, by 1,951 votes.

He joined the Indian National Congress and returned to Mawlai Assembly constituency in the 2018 Meghalaya Legislative Assembly election and regained his seat for Congress beating an independent candidate, Teiborlang Pathaw, by 361 votes. He later moved to the UDP in February 2022, and contested the 2023 election on their ticket.
