= Heaving Stone Kharpran =

Indian politician

Member of the Meghalaya Legislative Assembly
- Incumbent
- Assumed office 2023
- Preceded by: Pyniaid Sing Syiem
- Constituency: Mawryngkneng

Personal details
- Born: 1963 (age 62–63) Mawryngkneng, East Khasi Hills district, Meghalaya, India
- Party: Voice of the People Party
- Education: Bachelor of Science in Agriculture (Odisha University of Agriculture and Technology)

Heaving Stone Kharpran (born 1963) is an Indian politician from Meghalaya. He is a member of the Meghalaya Legislative Assembly from Mawryngkneng Assembly constituency, which is reserved for Scheduled Tribe community, in East Khasi Hills district. He won the 2023 Meghalaya Legislative Assembly election representing the Voice of the People Party.

== Early life and education ==
Kharpran is from Mawryngkneng, East Khasi Hills district, Meghalaya. He is the son of the late B. Rowell Roy Wahlang. He completed his B.Sc. in agriculture in 1986 at Orissa University of Agriculture and Technology, Bhubaneswar. He is a retired government employee.

== Career ==
Kharpran won the Mawryngkneng Assembly constituency representing the Voice of the People Party in the 2023 Meghalaya Legislative Assembly election. He polled 11,424 votes and defeated his nearest rival, Osaphi Smithson Jyrwa of the United Democratic Party, by a margin of 1,242 votes. He is interested in developing infrastructure for schools through MLA Special Rural Works programme scheme funds and inaugurated one such school, the Spark Morning School in Mawlynrei, in December 2024.
