= Mawryngkneng Assembly constituency =

Legislative Assembly constituency in Meghalaya State, India

Coordinates: 25.55°N 92.06°E

Mawryngkneng
- Constituency No. 13 for the Meghalaya Legislative Assembly

Constituency details
- Country: India
- Region: Northeast India
- State: Meghalaya
- District: East Khasi Hills
- Lok Sabha constituency: Shillong
- Established: 2008
- Total electors: 39,802
- Reservation: ST

Member of Legislative Assembly
- 11th Meghalaya Legislative Assembly
- Incumbent Heaving Stone Kharpran
- Party: Voice of the People Party
- Elected year: 2023

Mawryngkneng is one of the 60 Legislative Assembly constituencies of Meghalaya state in India. It is part of East Khasi Hills district and is reserved for candidates belonging to the Scheduled Tribes. Heaving Stone Kharpran is the current MLA from this constituency.

== Members of the Legislative Assembly ==
Year	Member	Party
2013	David A Nongrum	Independent politician
2018	David A Nongrum	Indian National Congress
2021 By-election	Pyniaid Sing Syiem	National People's Party
2023	Heaving Stone Kharpran	Voice of the People Party

== Election results ==
=== Assembly Election 2023 ===
2023 Meghalaya Legislative Assembly election: Mawryngkneng
Party	Candidate	Votes	%	±%
VPP	Heaving Stone Kharpran	11,424	33.36%	New
UDP	Osaphi Smithson Jyrwa	10,182	29.73%	New
NPP	Pyniaid Sing Syiem	9,541	27.86%	▼21.64
AITC	Banshanlang Lawai	1,559	4.55%	New
BJP	Highlander Kharmalki	968	2.83%	New
INC	Esron Marwein	433	1.26%	▼41.90
NOTA	None of the Above	282	0.82%	▼0.01
Margin of victory		1,242	3.63%	▼2.71
Turnout		34,243	86.03%	▲8.26
Registered electors		39,802		▲8.10
VPP gain from NPP		Swing	▼16.14	

=== Assembly By-election 2021 ===
This by-election was needed due to the death of sitting MLA, Syntar Klas Sunn after a cardiac arrest, on 2 February 2021. The election, which was carried out on 30 October 2021, was won by Pyniaid Sing Syiem, a candidate of the National People's Party.

2021 Meghalaya Legislative Assembly by-election: Mawryngkneng
Party	Candidate	Votes	%	±%
NPP	Pyniaid Sing Syiem	14,177	49.51%	▲27.99
INC	Highlander Kharmalki	12,361	43.16%	▲5.91
Independent	Norbert Marboh	1,400	4.89%	New
Independent	Esron Marwein	485	1.69%	New
Independent	Arbiangkam Kharsohmat	214	0.75%	New
NOTA	None of the Above	238	0.83%	▲0.17
Margin of victory		1,816	6.34%	▼7.22
Turnout		28,637	78.43%	▼8.41
Registered electors		36,820		▲14.37
NPP gain from INC		Swing	▲12.25	

=== Assembly Election 2018 ===
2018 Meghalaya Legislative Assembly election: Mawryngkneng
Party	Candidate	Votes	%	±%
INC	David Nongrum	10,336	37.25%	▲12.44
PDF	Highlander Kharmalki	6,573	23.69%	New
NPP	Pyniaid Sing Syiem	5,969	21.51%	New
UDP	Pynehborlang Mukhim	3,011	10.85%	▼7.71
KHNAM	Moses Kharbithai	1,037	3.74%	New
BJP	Torry Teison Kharsati	411	1.48%	New
NOTA	None of the Above	184	0.66%	New
Margin of victory		3,763	13.56%	▲10.78
Turnout		27,746	86.18%	▼2.97
Registered electors		32,195		▲27.77
INC gain from Independent		Swing	▲9.65	

=== Assembly Election 2013 ===
2013 Meghalaya Legislative Assembly election: Mawryngkneng
Party	Candidate	Votes	%	±%
Independent	David Nongrum	6,200	27.60%	New
INC	Pynehborlang Mukhim	5,574	24.81%	New
UDP	Highlander Kharmalki	4,170	18.56%	New
Independent	Osaphi Smithson Jyrwa	3,287	14.63%	New
Independent	Munu Paul Muktieh	2,030	9.04%	New
HSPDP	Pyniaid Sing Syiem	1,204	5.36%	New
Margin of victory		626	2.79%	
Turnout		22,465	89.15%	
Registered electors		25,198		
Independent win (new seat)				

== See also ==
- List of constituencies of the Meghalaya Legislative Assembly
- East Khasi Hills district
