= Nongkhyllem Wildlife Sanctuary =

Wildlife sanctuary in Meghalaya, India

- NWS
- IUCN category IV (habitat/species management area)
- Location within Meghalaya Location within India
- Interactive map of Nongkhyllem Wildlife Sanctuary
- Location: Ri-Bhoi district, Meghalaya, India
- Nearest city: Shillong and Guwahati
- Coordinates: 25°56′16.44″N 91°47′15″E 25° 56′ 16.44″ N, 91° 47′ 15″ E
- Area: 29 km (18 miles)
- Max. elevation: 950m
- Min. elevation: 200m
- Established: 1981

Nongkhyllem Wildlife Sanctuary is an IUCN Category IV protected area located in Meghalaya, India. It covers 29 square kilometers in Ri-Bhoi district. It was designated a wildlife sanctuary in 1981.

== History ==
As of 2025, Meghalaya has a protected area network of around 1133 km^{2}, which is over 5% of the total geographical area of the state. These include two national parks, four wildlife sanctuaries, and one biosphere reserve area.

The Nongkhyllem Wildlife Sanctuary was first created by the colonial British administration as 'Nongkhyllem Reserved Forest' in July 1909. The area was expanded by consequent notifications in 1913, 1933, and 1939. The eastern part of the reserve was converted into the 'Nongkhyllem Wildlife Sanctuary' in 1981 measuring 29 km^{2}. The remaining part of the reserved forest was maintained as such. The latter consists of the Nongkhyllem Reserve Forest (9691 ha) and a portion of community-managed forest (2300 ha) which was acquired by the Meghalaya state government.

Initially, the conservation efforts focused on mithun and clouded leopard.

An Eco-Sensitive Zone was declared around the sanctuary by the India's Ministry of Forest, Environment and Climate Change in 2017. In 2021 it was rated the best protected areas in Northeast India out of 16, by a report on Management Effectiveness Evaluation (MEE) on national parks and wildlife sanctuaries in India. One of the reasons give was its continuity of a management plan since 2001 irrespective of the people posted there. The other reason was significant reduction in biotic interference due to community support.

== Geography ==
=== Geology ===
Meghalaya is part of an Archean plateau with undulating tablelands.

=== Hydrology ===
The streams from the sanctuary join the rivers Umtrew, Umtasor, and Umsaw.

=== Climate ===
The sanctuary has a tropical monsoon climate with temperature ranging from 6 °C to 32 °C and average annual rainfall about 2000-3000mm.

== Biology ==
The sanctuary's minimal biotic interaction is a positive factor for its biodiversity.

=== Flora ===
The sanctuary consists of mainly tropical moist deciduous forest, with parts of it being tropical semi-evergreen forest, montane grasslands, and large stretches of bamboo grooves.

Naturally growing trees of economic importance consists of, terminalia bellirica, terminalia chebula, albizia lebbeck, adina cordifolia, schima wallichii, shorea robusta, anthoshorea assamica, aesculus assamica, aporosa wallichii, cryptocarya andersonii, lagerstroemia parviflora, bridelia retusa, magnolia hodgsonii, and gmelina arborea. The forest department has created plantations of sal and teak in some parts.

=== Fauna ===
There are at least 50 known species of mammals and 25 species of reptiles in the sanctuary. 30 of these mammals species are on the Schedule 1 of the Wild Life (Protection) Act, 1972. There are over 400 noted species of birds, including the endangered rufous-necked hornbill and white-cheeked partridge. At least 39 species of fishes have been documented in recent times. The sanctuary and its adjacent areas are ideal habitat for the endangered Himalayan mahseer, schistura sijuensis, clarias magur, and Pillaia indica.

The large mammals that live here include, the Asian elephant, tiger, leopard, clouded leopard, leopard cat, jungle cat, fishing cat, dhole, Himalayan black bear, sloth bear, Hoolock gibbon, slow loris, capped langur, rhesus macaque, sambar deer, muntjac, gaur, binturong, and black giant squirrel. Wild boar, civets, and mongoose, are also found in the sanctuary.

According to BirdLife International, the sanctuary is one of the 'Important Bird Area' (IBA) and is designated A1 (Threatened species) according to the IBA criteria. Four species of hornbills are found in the area, rufous-necked hornbill, great hornbill, Malabar pied hornbill, and wreathed hornbill. In addition, there are various species of woodpeckers, bulbuls, laughingthrushes, and minivets, including winter visitors from higher biomes. The sanctuary and the reserve forest are surrounded by community-managed forests and wooded betel leaf farms. These collectively support the avian diversity and habitat. In addition, the agricultural woodlands supported more avian species than the protected areas.

Lepidoptera in the sanctuary
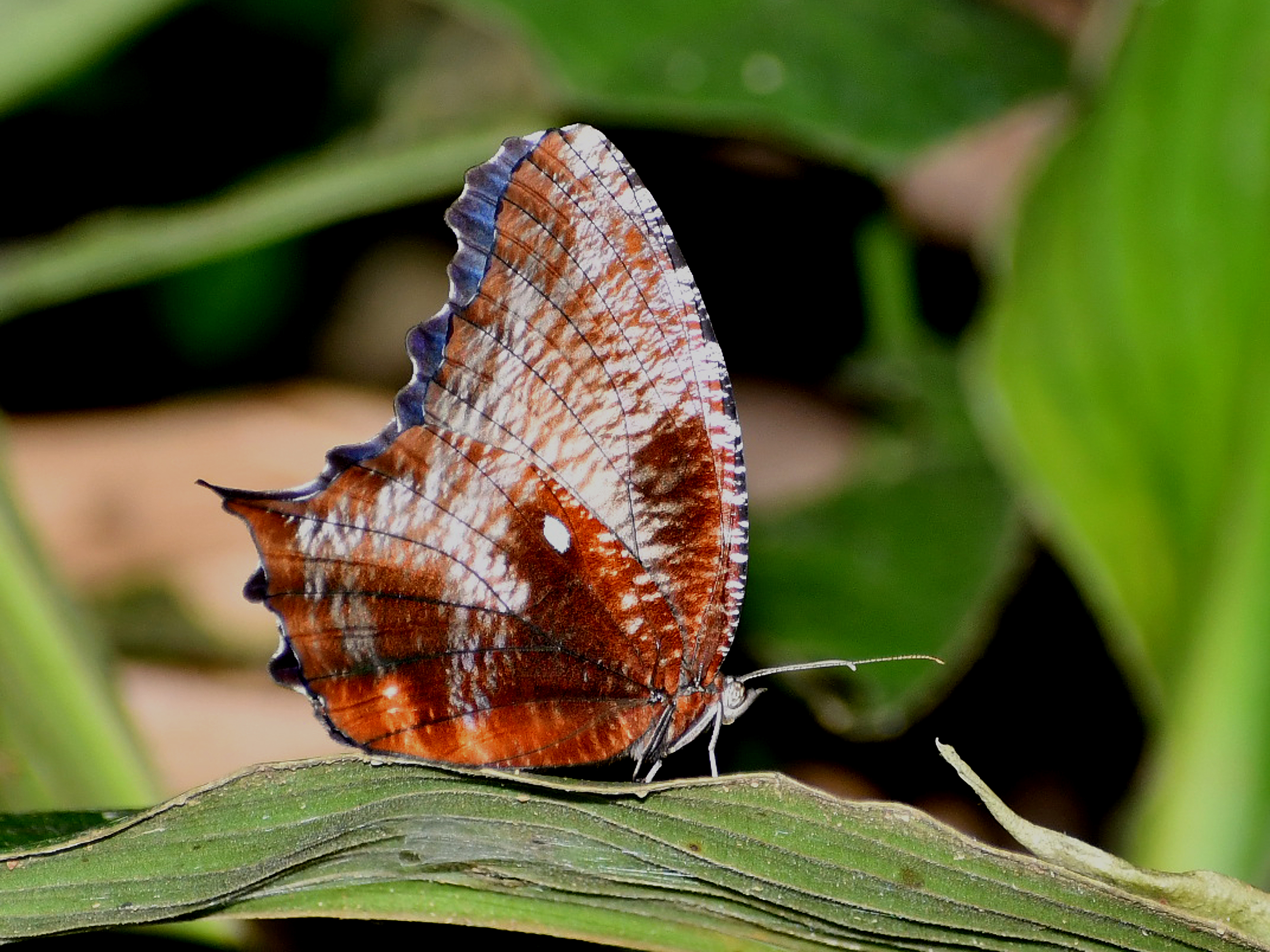
Brahmaputra palmfly

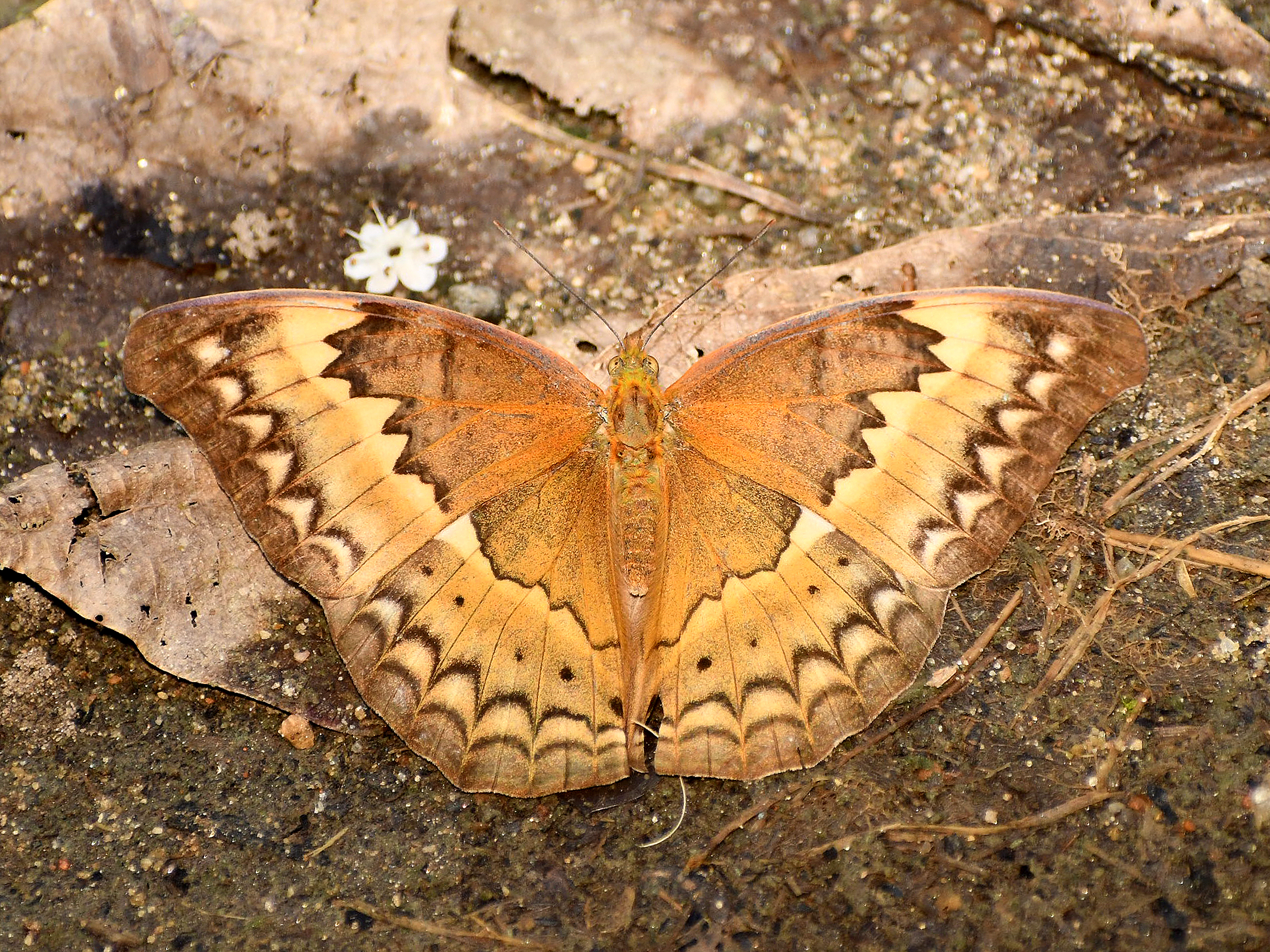
Large yeoman

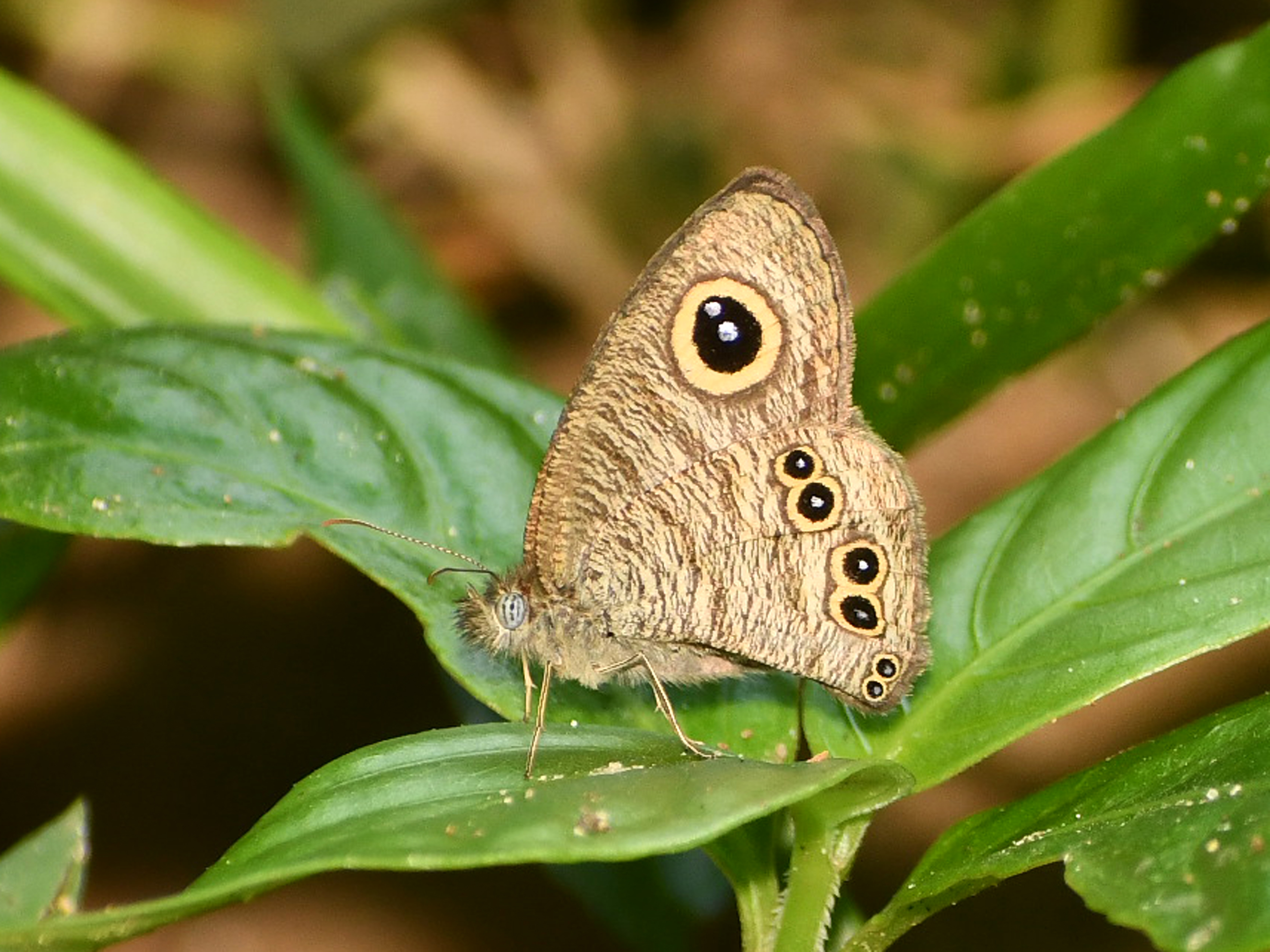
Common five-ring

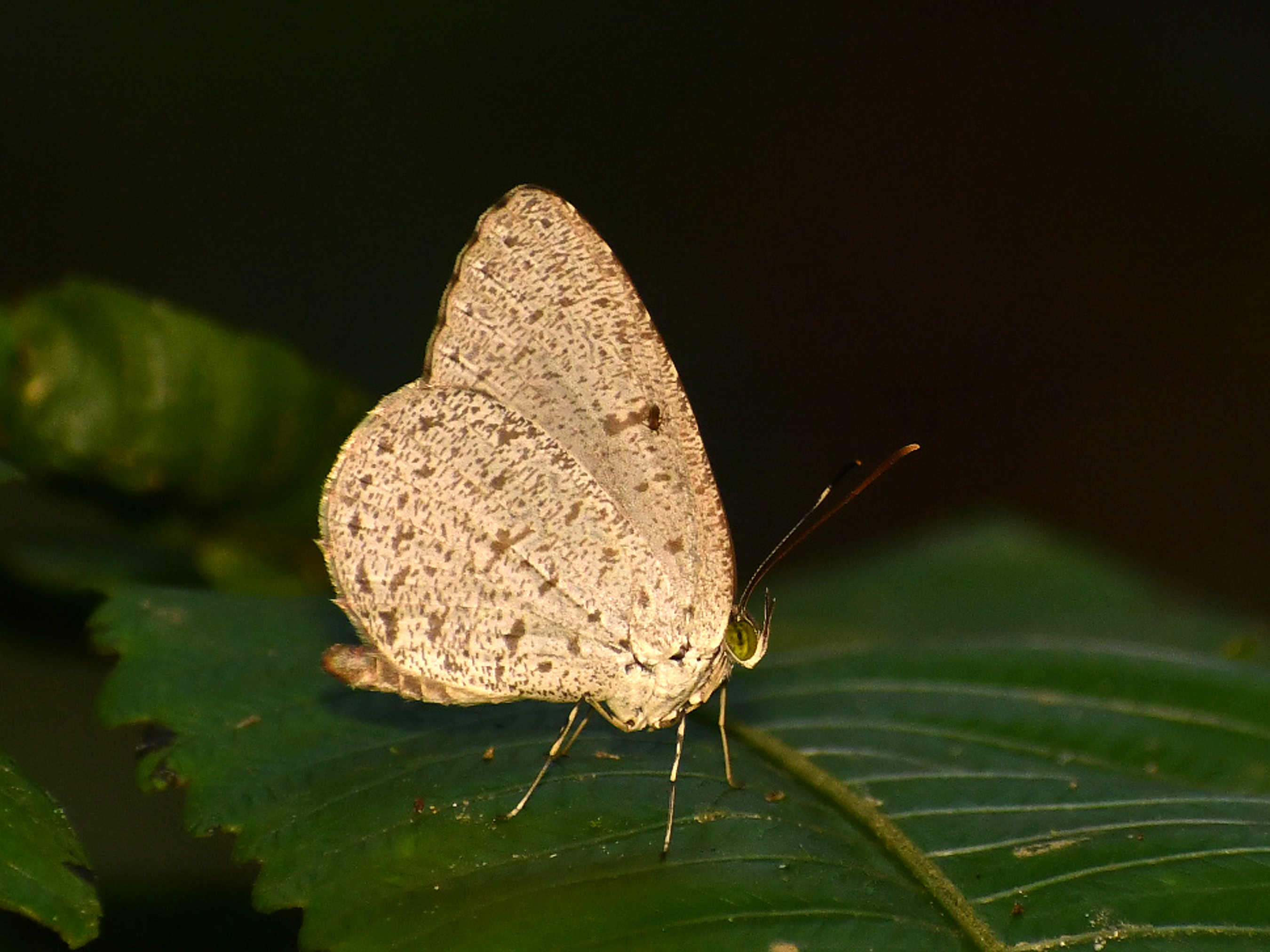
Plain mottle

In 2021 researchers found the Disk-footed bat for the first time in the Lailad area near the sanctuary. This was almost 1000 km from the nearest known habitat in Myanmar. It is one of at least 66 species of bats found in the state. A new species of bamboo-dwelling bat, found near the sanctuary, was classified as Glischropus meghalayanus in 2022. It was the first reported dwelling of the thick-thumbed bat in South Asia.

In 2024 researchers from Ashoka Trust for Research in Ecology and the Environment found the dung beetle species Onitis bordati in the sanctuary for the first time expanding its known range from Vietnam and Thailand.

== Management ==
The Meghalaya government manages the sanctuary under the Meghalaya Forest Regulation (Assam Regulation 7 of 1891 adopted by Meghalaya).

== Recreation ==
There are no official figures for the annual visitors to the sanctuary. However, people from neighbouring villages often visit the area as its stewards.

The NH6 is located on the eastern side of the reserved forest. It has been developed into a four-lane highway since 2016. The nearest town is Nongpoh, but the sanctuary is well connected to Shillong and Guwahati. While travelling from Shillong, which is 80 km away, the sanctuary can be accssed through the forest beat offices at Adit point, Umtasor and Lailad. From the NH6, the sanctuary can reached through Umling, and then 17 km along the Umling-Patharkhmah road to reach Lailad. Meghalaya's SH3, which runs through the Eastern West Khasi Hills and Ri-Bhoi districts, is on the western side of the reserved forest. It was converted into two-lane road in 2020. Shared taxis and buses are available between Shillong and Nongpoh. The Shillong Airport is approximately 67 km, and Guwahati Airport is at 61 km.

=== Eco-tourism project ===
In 2025 the Government of Meghalaya proposed an eco-tourism infrastructure project, valued at approximately Rs 23.60 crore, within the wildlife sanctuary. The project designed by E-factor Experiences, based in Noida, proposed to create a chalet-styled resort, interpretation centre, canopy-based skywalks, and water sports zone.

Seven village around the sanctuary have also opposed the project due to lack of community consultation and obvious threat to the ecosystem. The village councils, Rangbah Shnong, issued a joint statement against the project. Meghalaya-based organisation, The Green-Tech Foundation, also strongly opposed the project. The Hynniewtrep Youth Council (HYC) also called for the project to be scrapped.

== See also ==
- Narpuh Wildlife Sanctuary
