= David Nongrum =

Indian politician

David A. Nongrum (1979 - 2 February 2021) was an Indian politician from Meghalaya. He was a former two time member of the Meghalaya Lagislative Assembly from the Mawryngkneng Assembly constituency, which is reserved for the Scheduled Tribe community, in East Khasi Hills district. He first won as an Independent Candidate in 2013 and retained the seat on Congress ticket in 2018.

== Early life ==
Nongrum was from Shillong, East Khasi Hills district, Meghalaya. He was the son of veteran Congress leader and former Meghalaya speaker Charles Pyngrope and his mother was B Nongrum. He studied Class 12 and passed the examinations conducted by the Meghalaya Board of School Education in 1995. He declared assets worth Rs.4 crore in 2013 and Rs.9 crore in 2018, in his affidavits to the Election Commission of India.

== Career ==
Nongrum won the Mawryngkneng Assembly constituency in the 2013 Meghalaya Legislative Assembly election. He was denied a ticket by the Indian national Congress and he resigned from the party and contested as an independent politician. He He polled 6,200 votes and defeated his nearest rival, Pynehborlang Mukhim of the Indian National Congress, by 626 votes. He later joined the Indian National Congress and retained the seat in the 2018 Meghalaya Legislative Assembly election where he polled 10,336 votes and defeated his closest opponent, Highlander Kharmalki of the People's Democratic Front (Meghalaya), by 3,763 votes.

=== Death ===
Nongrum died of cardiac arrest. He was declared brought dead to North Eastern Indira Gandhi Regional Institute of Health & Medical Sciences on 2 February 2021.
