= Ardent Miller Basaiawmoit =

Indian politician

President of Voice of the People Party (Meghalaya)
- Incumbent
- Assumed office March 2023

Member of the Meghalaya Legislative Assembly
- Incumbent
- Assumed office March 2023
- Preceded by: Lambor Malngiang
- Constituency: Nongkrem
- In office 2008–2018
- Preceded by: Lambor Malngiang
- Succeeded by: Lambor Malngiang
- Constituency: Nongkrem

Personal details
- Born: July 6, 1972 (age 54) Meghalaya, India
- Party: Voice of the People Party

Ardent Miller Basaiawmoit (born 6 July 1972) is an Indian politician from the state of Meghalaya who is the President of Voice of the People Party (Meghalaya). He currently represents Nongkrem in the Meghalaya Legislative Assembly.

== Political activities ==
After winning four seats at the 2023 Meghalaya Legislative Assembly election, Basaiawmoit voiced his intention for the Voice of the People Party (Meghalaya) to form the government in Meghalaya in 2028.

On 20 March 2023, Basaiawmoit and fellow VPP MLAs protested the Governor of Meghalaya's speech, made in Hindi, during the first budget session of the Assembly, by storming out. He noted that as Meghalaya is non-Hindi speaking the "Centre has insulted Meghalaya by sending a governor who cannot speak in the state's official language".
