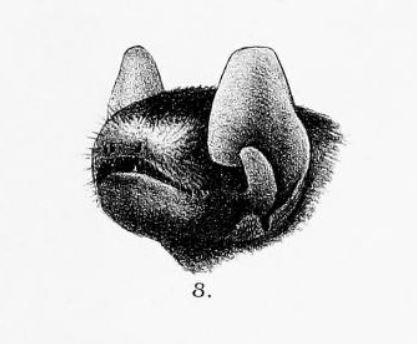

Conservation status
- Least Concern (IUCN 3.1)

Scientific classification
- Kingdom: Animalia
- Phylum: Chordata
- Class: Mammalia
- Order: Chiroptera
- Family: Vespertilionidae
- Genus: Glischropus
- Species: G. tylopus

Binomial name
- Glischropus tylopus (Dobson, 1875)
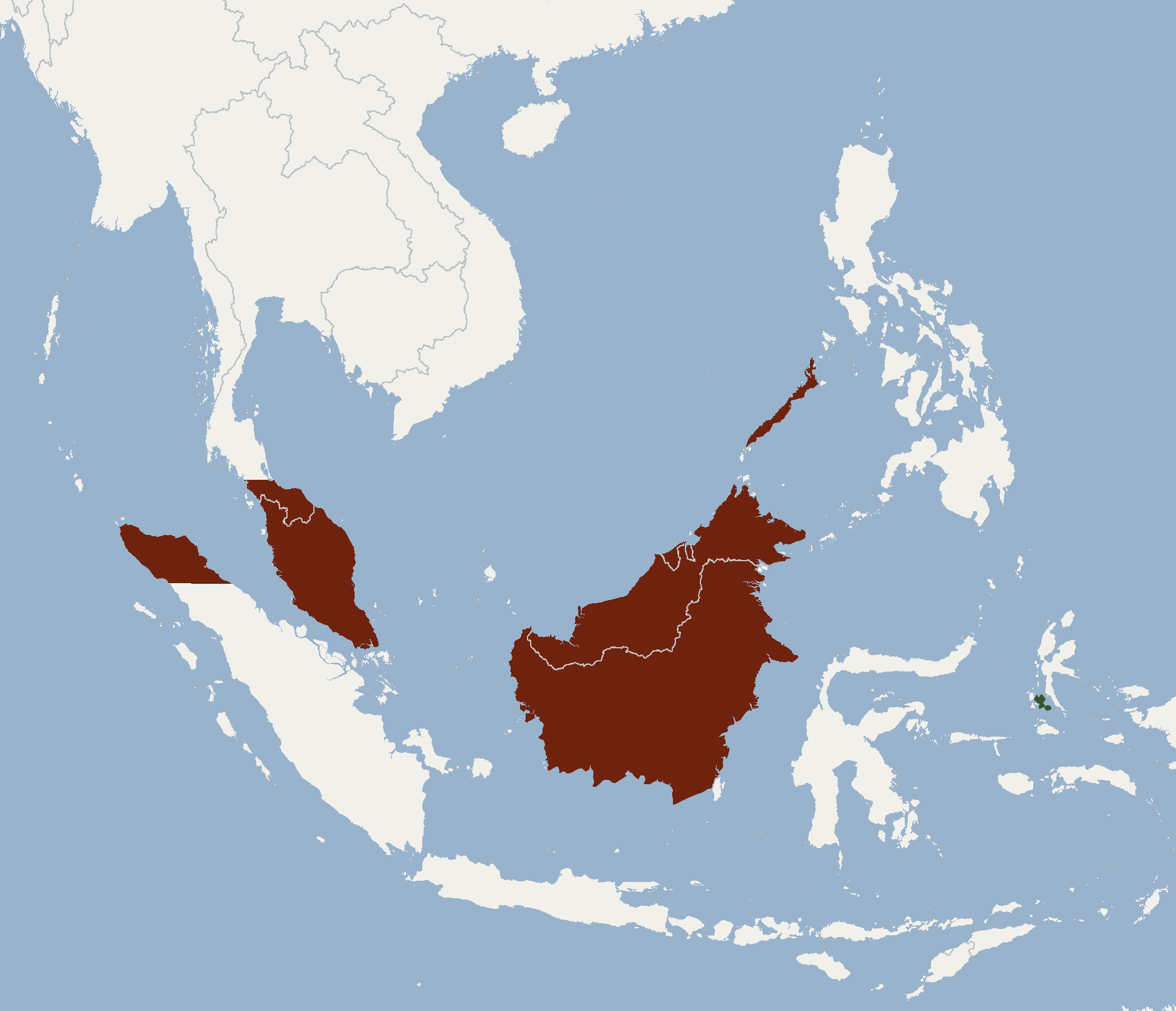

= Common thick-thumbed bat =

Species of bat

The common thick-thumbed bat (Glischropus tylopus) is a species of vesper bat found in Brunei, Indonesia, Malaysia, Philippines, and Thailand.

== Taxonomy ==
The common thick-thumbed bat was described as a new species in 1875 by George Edward Dobson. He placed it in the now-defunct genus Vesperugo, with a binomial of Vesperugo tylopus. The holotype had been collected in northern Borneo. The collector of the holotype is unknown.

== Description ==
The common thick-thumbed bat has a forearm length of 28–31 mm (1.1–1.2 in), a tail length of 32–36 mm (1.3–1.4 in), and an ear length of 9–11 mm (0.35–0.43 in). Individuals weigh 3.7–4.8 g (0.13–0.17 oz). The fur on the back is darker brown and shaggy, with the underside paler. The base of the thumbs and the soles of the feet have thickened pads that may be white or pink in color.

== Biology and ecology ==
The common thick-thumbed bat is nocturnal, frequently roosting in dead or damaged bamboo stalks, rock crevices, or banana leaves during the day.

== Range and habitat ==
The common thick-thumbed bat lives in forested environments in Southeast Asia, including Thailand, Malaysia, Indonesia, the Philippines, and Brunei.
