= Voice of the People Party (Meghalaya) =

Political party in India

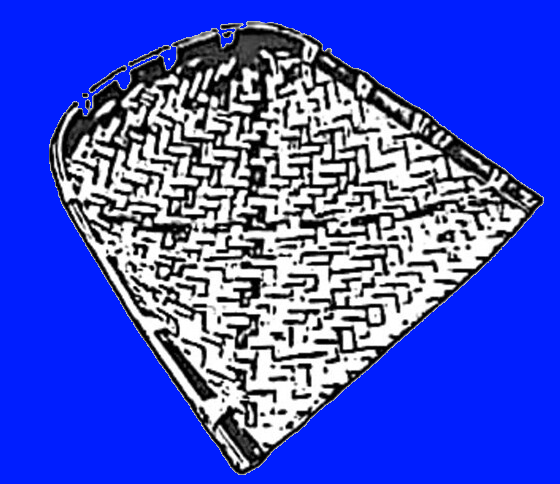
- Abbreviation: VPP
- President: Ardent Miller Basaiawmoit
- General Secretary: Vacant
- Founded: 2021
- Ideology: Regionalism
- ECI Status: State Party (Meghalaya)
- Seats in Lok Sabha: 0 / 543
- Seats in Meghalaya Legislative Assembly: 4 / 60

Election symbol
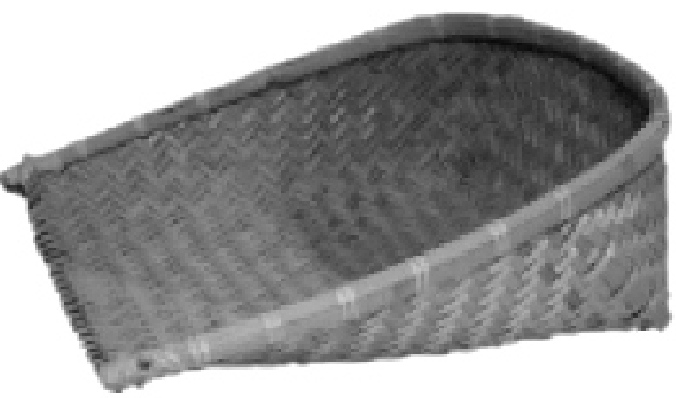

The Voice of the People Party is a political party established in November 2021 in the Indian state of Meghalaya. The party president is Ardent Miller Basaiawmoit, who was elected to the Meghalaya Legislative assembly from Nongkrem constituency in the 2013 election and again in the 2023 election. The party contested 18 constituencies in the 2023 Meghalaya Legislative Assembly election and won 4 seats.

== Political activities ==
After winning four seats at the 2023 Meghalaya Legislative Assembly election, Basaiawmoit voiced his intention for the Voice of the People Party (Meghalaya) to form the government in Meghalaya in 2028.

On 20 March 2023, Basaiawmoit and fellow VPP MLAs protested the Governor of Meghalaya's speech, made in Hindi, during the first budget session of the Assembly, by storming out. He noted that as Meghalaya is non-Hindi speaking the "Centre has insulted Meghalaya by sending a governor who cannot speak in the state's official language".

== Electoral performance ==
Election Year	Overall votes	% of overall votes	seats contested	seats won	+/- in seats	+/- in vote share	Sitting side
Lok sabha
2024	571,078		1	1	▲1	-	Left (Opposition)
Meghalaya
2023	101,264	5.46	18	4	▲4	-	Left (Opposition)

== List of Member of Parliament ==
^{†} Died in office

Map	Lok Sabha	Portrait	Member of Parliament	Constituency	Margin
2024 Indian general election	18th Lok Sabha		Ricky AJ Syngkon ^{†}	Shillong Lok Sabha constituency	3,71,910

== Members of Legislative Assembly ==
Year	Assembly	Portrait	MLA	Constituency	Margin
2023	11th Meghalaya Assembly		Ardent Miller Basaiawmoit	Nongkrem	
2023	11th Meghalaya Assembly		Heavingstone Kharpran	Mawryngkneng	
2023	11th Meghalaya Assembly		Adelbert Nongrum	North Shillong	
2023	11th Meghalaya Assembly		Brightstarwell Marbaniang	Mawlai	

== Runner-up Candidates ==
Year	Assembly	Constituencies	Runner-up Candidate	Lost by
2023	11th Meghalaya Assembly	South Shillong	Danny Langsthei	11,609
2023	11th Meghalaya Assembly	Mylliem	Aibandaplin F. Lyngdoh	39

== See also ==
- List of political parties in India
- 2025 Khasi Hills Autonomous District Council election
