= Mawlai =

- town
- Location in Meghalaya, India Mawlai (India)
- Coordinates: 25.6313800°N 91.8839800°E
- Country: India
- State: Meghalaya
- District: East Khasi Hills

Population (2011)
  - Total: 55,012

Languages
  - Official: Khasi, English
- Time zone: UTC+5:30 (IST)
- Vehicle registration: ML

Mawlai is a census town in East Khasi Hills district in the Indian state of Meghalaya.

== Demographics ==
As of 2001 India census, Mawlai had a population of 38,241. Males constitute 48% of the population and females 52%. Mawlai has an average literacy rate of 73%, higher than the national average of 59.5%: male literacy is 74%, and female literacy is 72%. In Mawlai, 16% of the population is under 6 years of age.

=== Religion ===
Most of the people in the town follow Christianity, while few remained in the Khasi Traditional Belief, Niam Khasi.
