= Nongpoh =

- Town
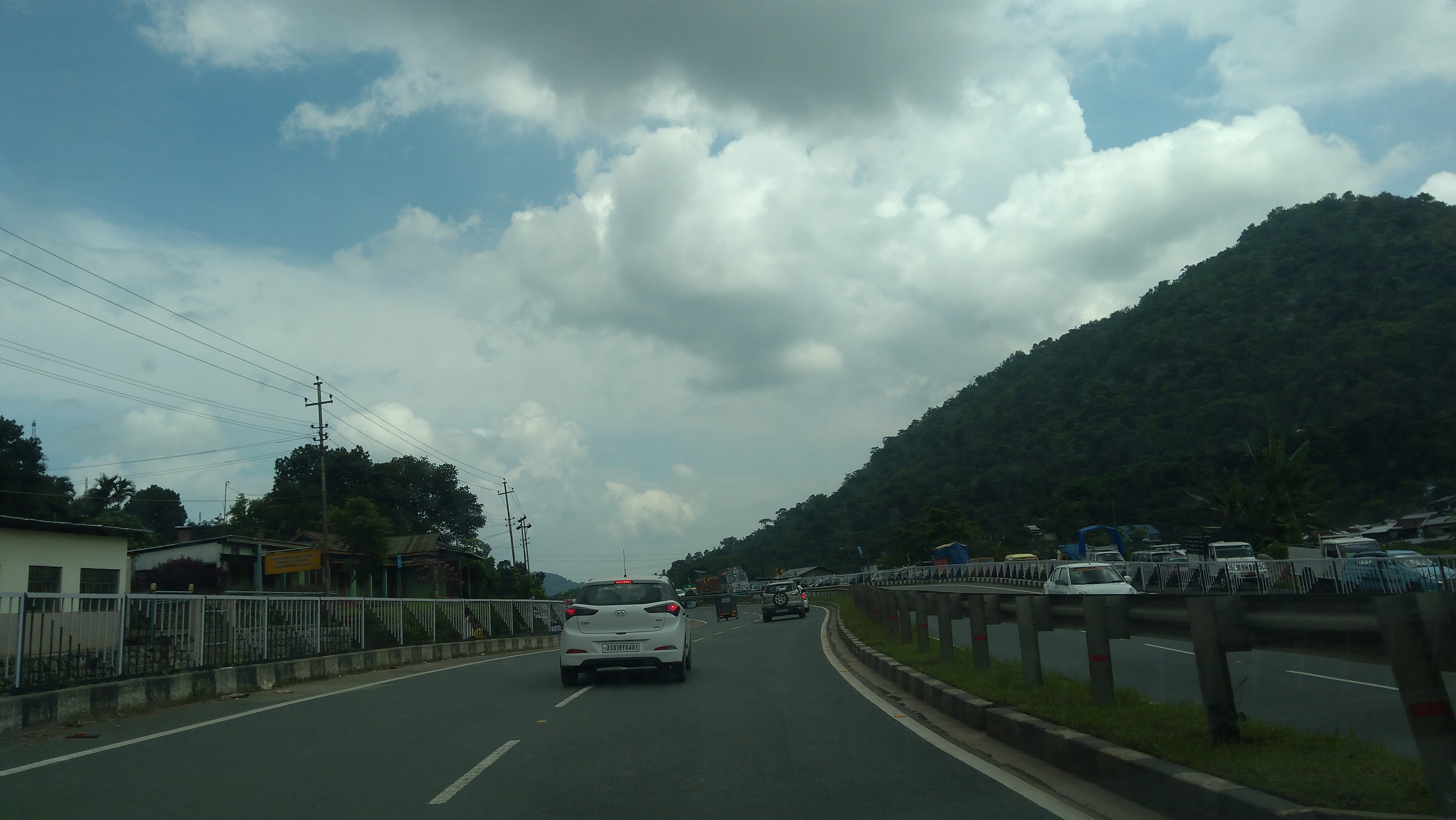
- Nongpoh town road

- Location of Nongpoh in Meghalaya Nongpoh (India) Nongpoh (Asia)
- Coordinates: 25.9°N 91.88°E
- Country: India
- State: Meghalaya
- District: Ri Bhoi
- Elevation: 554 m (1,818 ft)

Population (2011)
  - Total: 17,055

Language
  - Regional: Khasi
- Time zone: UTC+5:30 (IST)
- Vehicle registration: ML-10
- Climate: Cwa

Nongpoh (Khasi: [nɒŋˈpɒ(ə)]) is the administrative centre of Ri-Bhoi district in the Indian state of Meghalaya. Nongpoh is located on National Highway 40, fifty-two kilometers from the state capital Shillong and forty-eight kilometers from Guwahati in the state of Assam.

== Geography ==
Nongpoh is located at 25.9°N 91.88°E. It has an average elevation of 485 metres (1591 feet). Because of its proximity to the Brahmaputra plains, the weather during summer months tends to be humid and hot, while the winter months are pleasant and warm. Fruits such as pineapples, bananas, papayas and litchis are cultivated extensively throughout the Ri-Bhoi district. Betel leaf and nut trees are visible while traveling the roads that connect Nongpoh with Guwahati.

== Demographics ==
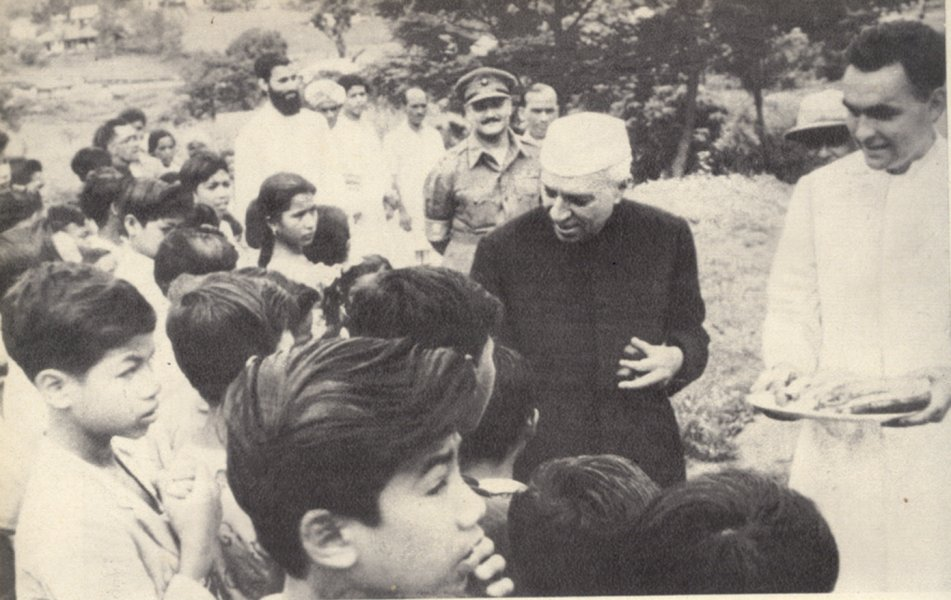
Jawaharlal Nehru distributing sweets to children at the Salesian oratory at Nongpoh, Meghalaya

As of 2011 Indian Census, Nongpoh had a total population of 17,055, of which 8,536 were males and 8,519 were females. Population within the age group of 0 to 6 years was 2,993. The total number of literates in Nongpoh was 11,610, which constituted 68.1% of the population with male literacy of 68.8% and female literacy of 67.3%. The effective literacy rate of 7+ population of Nongpoh was 82.6%, of which male literacy rate was 83.9% and female literacy rate was 81.2%. The Scheduled Castes and Scheduled Tribes population was 30 and 14,206 respectively. Nongpoh had 3160 households in 2011.

As of 2001 India census, Nongpoh had a population of 13,165. Males constituted 51% of the population and females 49%. Nongpoh has an average literacy rate of 61%, higher than the national average of 59.5%: male literacy is 63%, and female literacy is 59%. In Nongpoh, 21% of the population is under 6.

=== Religion ===
Religions in Nongpoh (2011)
1. Christianity (83.2%)
2. Hinduism (13.9%)
3. Islam (1.50%)
4. Others (1.37%)

Most of the people in the town follow Christianity, with significant followers of Hinduism and a small Muslim population.
