= Ri-Bhoi district =

Coordinates: 25°54′N 91°53′E

- District of Meghalaya
- Ri-Bhoi district Location in Meghalaya
- Country: India
- State: Meghalaya
- Headquarters: Nongpoh

Government
  - Vidhan Sabha constituencies: 4

Area
  - Total: 2,378 km^{2} (918 sq mi)

Population (2011)
  - Total: 258,840
  - Density: 108.8/km^{2} (281.9/sq mi)

Demographics
  - Literacy: 77.22%
- Time zone: UTC+05:30 (IST)
- Major highways: NH-40
- Website: ribhoi.gov.in

Ri-Bhoi district (English: /rɪ ˈbɔɪ/) is an administrative district in the state of Meghalaya in India. The district headquarters are located at Nongpoh. The district occupies an area of 2378 km^{2} and has a population of 258,840 (as of 2011). As of 2011 it is the second least populous district of Meghalaya (out of 7), after South Garo Hills.

== Etymology ==
The name is derived from the Bhoi sub-tribe of the Khasi people.

== History ==
The district was upgraded from subdivisional level to a full-fledged district on 4 June 1992. The new district, was created from a Civil Sub-division of the East Khasi Hills district.

== Geography ==
The district lies between 90°55' 15 to 91°16' latitude and 25°40' to 25°21' longitude. It is bounded on the north by Kamrup District, on the east by Jaintia Hills and Karbi Anglong District of Assam, and on the west by West Khasi Hills District. There are three C and RD Blocks and one administrative unit at Patharkhmah, and the number of villages is 561. Ri Bhoi District covers an area of 2,448 km^{2} (945 sq mi).

The headquarters of the District is at Nongpoh located 53 km (33 mi) from the state capital Shillong and 50 km (31 mi) from Guwahati in Assam.

The District is characterized by rugged and irregular land surface. It includes a series of hill ranges which gradually slope towards the north and finally join the Brahmaputra Valley. The important rivers flowing through this region includes the Umtrew, Umsiang, Umran and Umiam rivers.

=== Flora and fauna ===
In 1981 Ri-Bhoi district became home to the Nongkhyllem Wildlife Sanctuary, which has an area of 29 km^{2} (11.2 mi^{2}).

== Economy ==
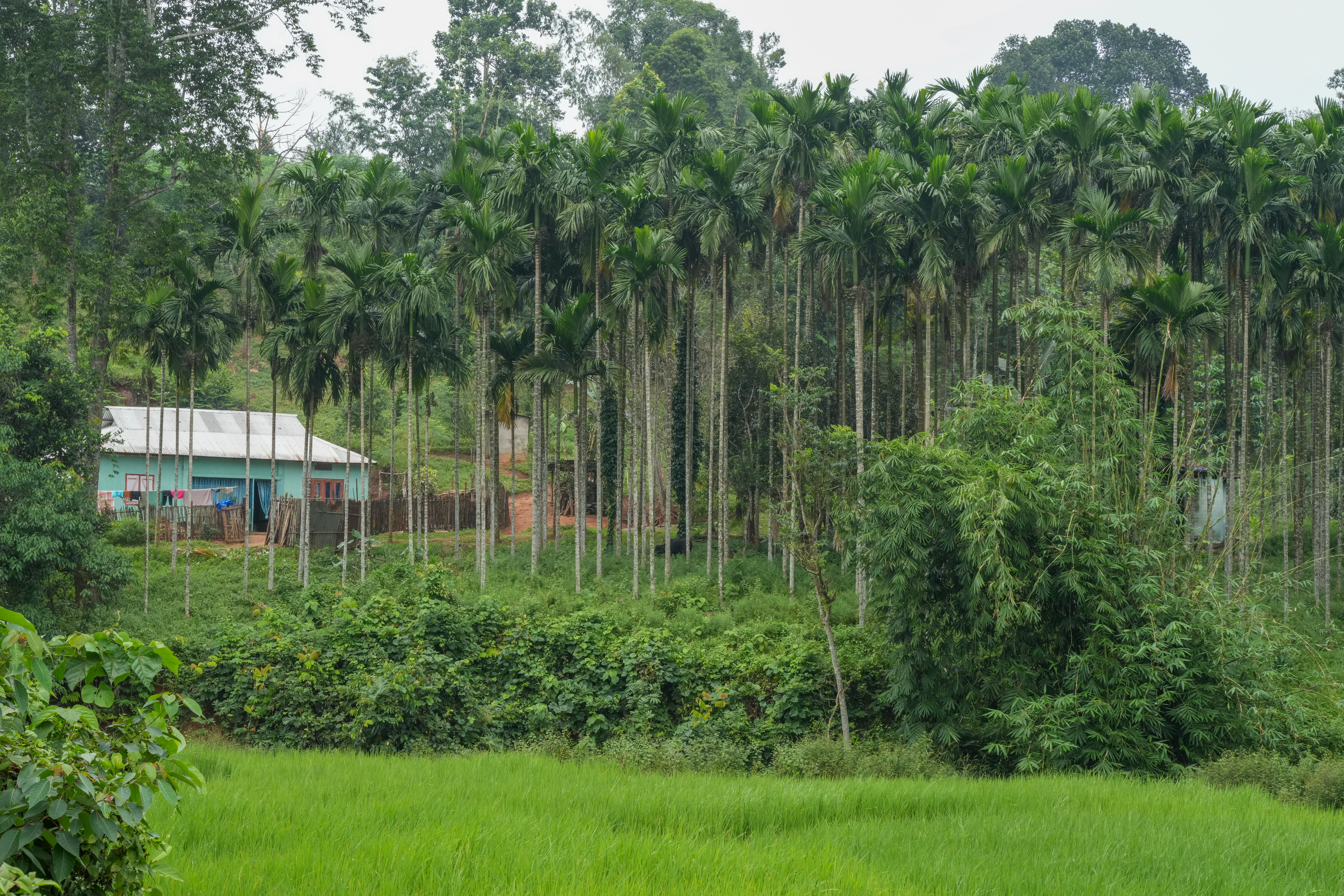
Paddy and areca palms near Jirang

In 2006 the Ministry of Panchayati Raj named Ri-Bhoi one of the country's 250 most backward districts (out of a total of 640). It is one of the three districts in Meghalaya currently receiving funds from the Backward Regions Grant Fund Programme (BRGF).

== Administration ==
=== Administrative divisions ===
Ri-Bhoi district is divided into three blocks:

Name	Headquarters	Population	Location
Jirang	Wahsynon		
Umling	Nongpoh		
Umsning	Umsning		

== Transport ==
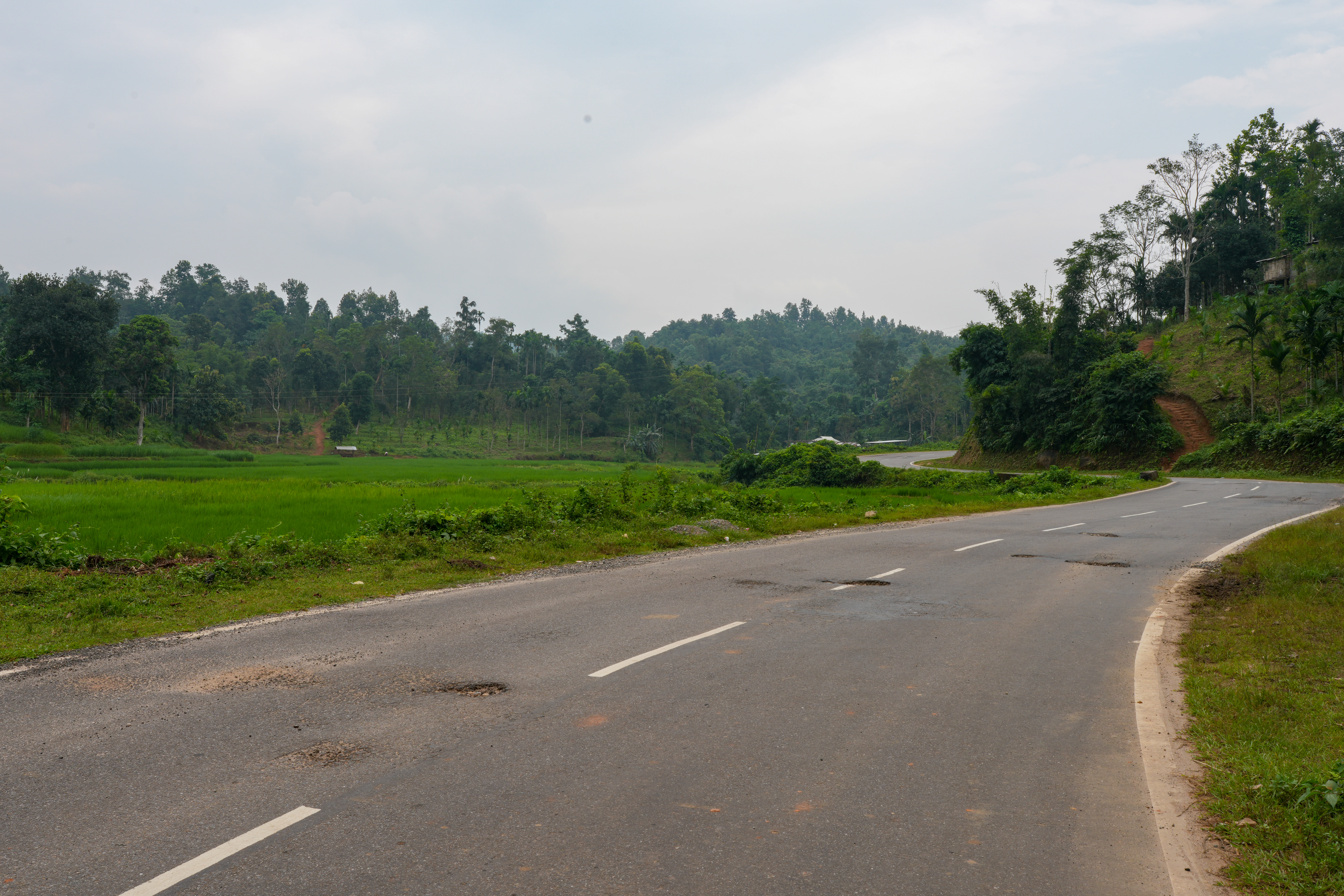
State Highway 3 near Jirang

The region has several important transport links connecting it with the other parts of Meghalaya and neighbouring states. Umroi Airport serves the area,while the four-lane road connecting Jorabat with Lad-Umroi and the Shillong Bypass provide additional road connectivity. The district also serves as an important route for travel between Shillong, Assam, Mizoram, Tripura, Manipur and Nagaland. National Highway 37, originating at Jorabat and extending towards Shillong, passes through the district.

== Demographics ==
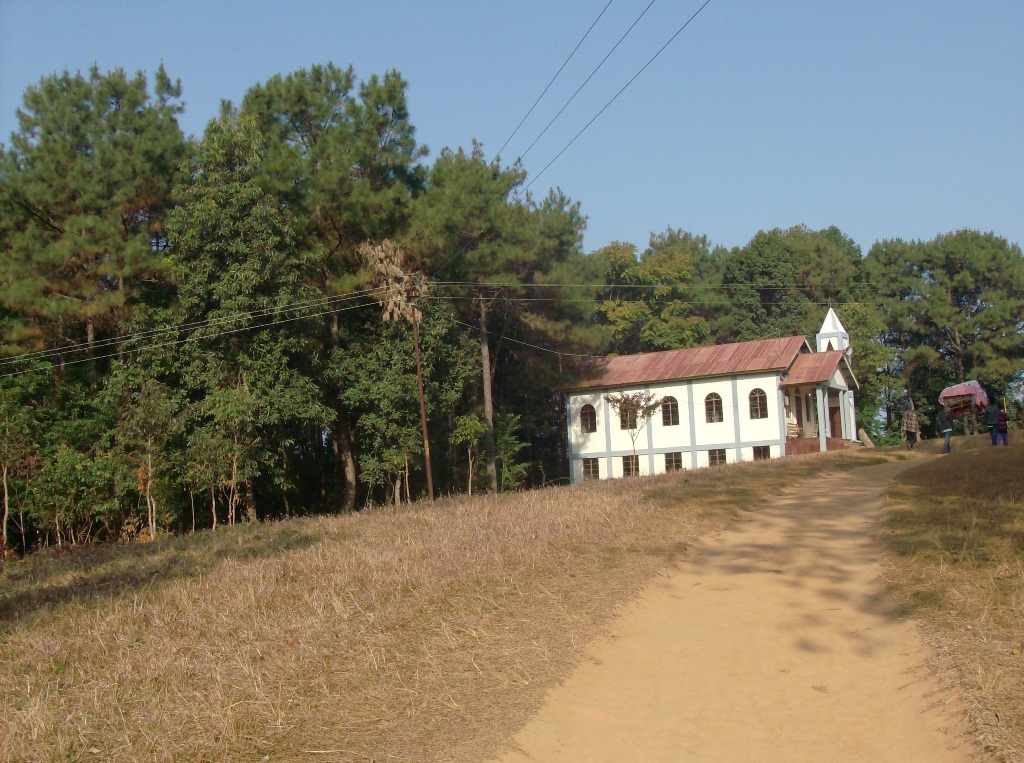
Presbyterian Church at Umbir

=== Population ===
According to the 2011 census Ri-Bhoi district has a population of 258,840, roughly equal to the nation of Vanuatu. This gives it a ranking of 580th in India (out of a total of 640). The district has a population density of 109 inhabitants per square kilometre (280/sq mi) . Its population growth rate over the decade 2001-2011 was 34.02%. Ri Bhoi has a sex ratio of 951 females for every 1000 males, and a literacy rate of 77.22%. Scheduled Tribes make up 88.89% of the population.

=== Religion ===
Religion in Ri-Bhoi district (2011)
Religions
Christianity	84.42%
Hinduism	11.96%
Tribal religion	2.44%
Islam	0.71%
Other or not stated	0.47%

=== Languages ===
Languages of Ri-Bhoi district (2011)
1. Khasi (68.0%)
2. Garo (5.74%)
3. Karbi (5.10%)
4. Nepali (4.06%)
5. Assamese (3.08%)
6. Hindi (1.56%)
7. Others (12.5%)

Khasi is the main language of the area. The main dialect spoken in Ri-Bhoi is Karow which is spoken in Nongpoh and its surrounding localities and the other native spoken dialects are Iapngar in Ri Bhoi and Mihngi, Nongtung in Far Eastern Ri Bhoi, Mynar in Far Western Ri Bhoi and Jirang area. It is more popularly known to other people as the Bhoi language. Languages used in the district include Amri, a Tibeto-Burman language related with Karbi, with 125 000 speakers and Tiwa spoken by around 2,000 Tiwas. There are number of tribes which exist in Ri-Bhoi like Marngars and Mikirs.
