= 10th Meghalaya Assembly =

Legislature

The 10th Meghalaya Legislative Assembly was constituted after the Meghalaya Legislative Assembly elections in 2018. The term of the assembly is for five years.

S No.	Constituency	Current MLA	Party	Notes
West Jaintia Hills District
1	Nartiang	Sniawbhalang Dhar	NPP	
2	Jowai	Wailadmiki Shylla	NPP	
3	Raliang	Comingone Ymbon	NPP	
4	Mowkaiaw	Nujorki Sungoh	UDP	
East Jaintia Hills District
5	Sutnga Saipung	Shitlang Pale	TMC	Defected from Congress in 2021
6	Khliehriat	Kyrmen Shylla	UDP	
West Jaintia Hills District
7	Amlarem	Lahkmen Rymbui	UDP	
Ri Bhoi District
8	Mawhati	Dasakhiatbha Lamare	NPP	
9	Nongpoh	Mayralborn Syiem	INC	
10	Jirang	Sosthenes Sohtun	NPP	
11	Umsning	Jason Sawkmie Mawlong	PDF	
12	Umroi	George Bankyntiewlang Lyngdoh	TMC	Defected from Congress in 2021
East Khasi Hills District
13	Mawryngkneng	David A Nongrum	INC	
14	Pynthorumkhrah	Alexander Laloo Hek	BJP	
15	Mawlai	Process T. Sawkmie	INC	
16	East Shillong	Ampareen Lyngdoh	INC	
17	North Shillong	Adelbert Nongrum	KHNAM	
18	West Shillong	Mohendro Rapsang	INC	
19	South Shillong	Sanbor Shullai	BJP	
20	Mylliem	Hamletson Dohling	PDF	
21	Nongthymmai	Charles Pyngrope	TMC	Defected from Congress in 2021
22	Nongkrem	Lambor Malngiang	IND	
23	Sohiong	Samlin Malngiang	HSPDP	
24	Mawphlang	Eugeneson Lyngdoh	UDP	Elected in bypolls in 2021
25	Mawsynram	Himalaya Muktan Shangpliang	TMC	Defected from Congress in 2021
26	Shella	Balajiedkupar Synrem	UDP	
27	Pynursla	Prestone Tynsong	NPP	
28	Sohra	Gavin Miguel Mylliem	PDF	
29	Mawkynrew	Banteidor Lyngdoh	PDF	
West Khasi Hills District
30	Mairang	Metbah Lyngdoh	UDP	
31	Mawthadraishan	Brolding Nongsiej	UDP	
32	Nongstoin	Macmillan Byrsat	NPP	
32	Rambrai-Jyrngam	Kimfa Sidney Marbaniang	INC	
34	Mawshynrut	Gigur Myrthong	NPP	
South West Khasi Hills District
35	Ranikor	Martin Danggo	UDP	
36	Mawkyrwat	Renikton Lyngdoh Tongkhar	HSPDP	
North Garo Hills District
37	Kharkutta	Rupert Momin	NPP	
38	Mendipathar	Marthon Sangma	TMC	Defected from Congress in 2021
39	Resubelpara	Timothy Shira	NPP	
40	Bajengdoba	Pongseng Marak	NPP	
South West Garo Hills District
41	Songsak	Mukul Sangma	TMC	Defected from Congress in 2021
East Garo Hills District
42	Rongjeng	Jim Sangma	NPP	
43	Williamnagar	Marcuise N. Marak	NPP	
West Garo Hills District
44	Raksamgre	Benedic Marak	NPP	
45	Tikrikilla	Jimmy Sangma	TMC	Defected from Congress in 2021
46	Phulbari	S. G. Esmatur Mominin	NPP	
47	Rajabala	Azad Zaman	INC	
48	Selsella	Clement Marak	INC	
49	Dadenggre	James Pangsang Kongkal Sangma	NPP	
50	North Tura	Thomas Sangma	NPP	
51	South Tura	Conrad Sangma	NPP	
South West Garo Hills District
52	Rangsakona	Zenith Sangma	TMC	Defected from Congress in 2021
53	Ampati	Miani D. Shira	TMC	Defected from Congress in 2021
West Garo Hills District
54	Mahendraganj	Dikkanchi Shira	TMC	Defected from Congress in 2021
South West Garo Hills District
55	Salmanpara	Winnerson Sangma	TMC	Defected from Congress in 2021
West Garo Hills District
56	Gambegre	Saleng Sangma	NCP	
57	Dalu	Brening Sangma	NPP	
South Garo Hills District
58	Rongara Siju	Rakkam Sangma	NPP	
59	Chokpot	Lazarus Sangma	TMC	Defected from Congress in 2021
60	Baghmara	Samuel Sangma	IND	

Source: News18
