= 2023 Meghalaya Legislative Assembly election =

Election for Unicameral legislature of Meghalaya

- 27 February 2023 (59 seats); 10 May 2023 (1 seat)

All 60 seats in the Meghalaya Legislative Assembly 31 seats needed for a majority
- Opinion polls
- Turnout: 86.81%(▲0.16pp)
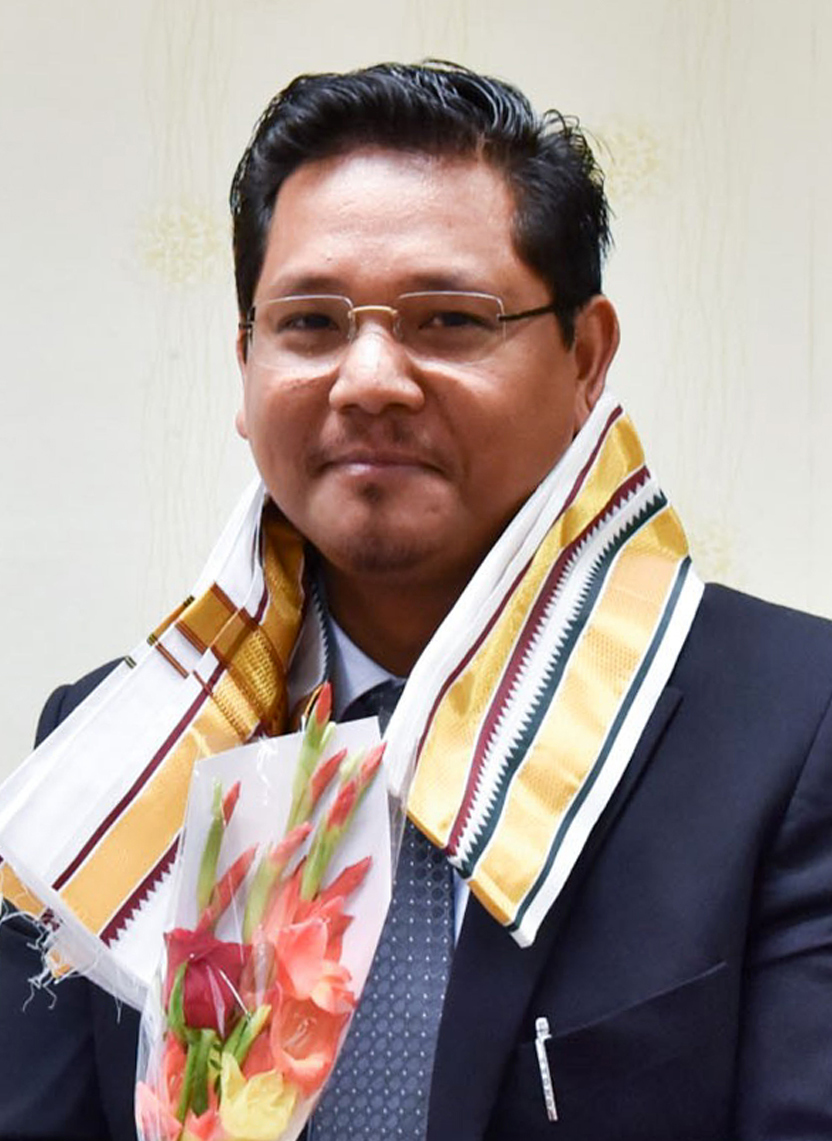

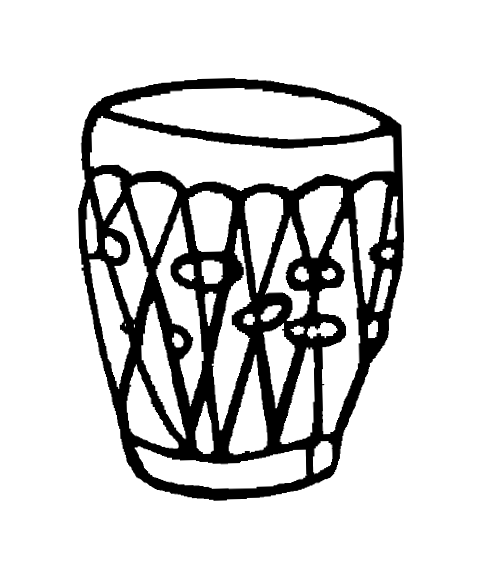

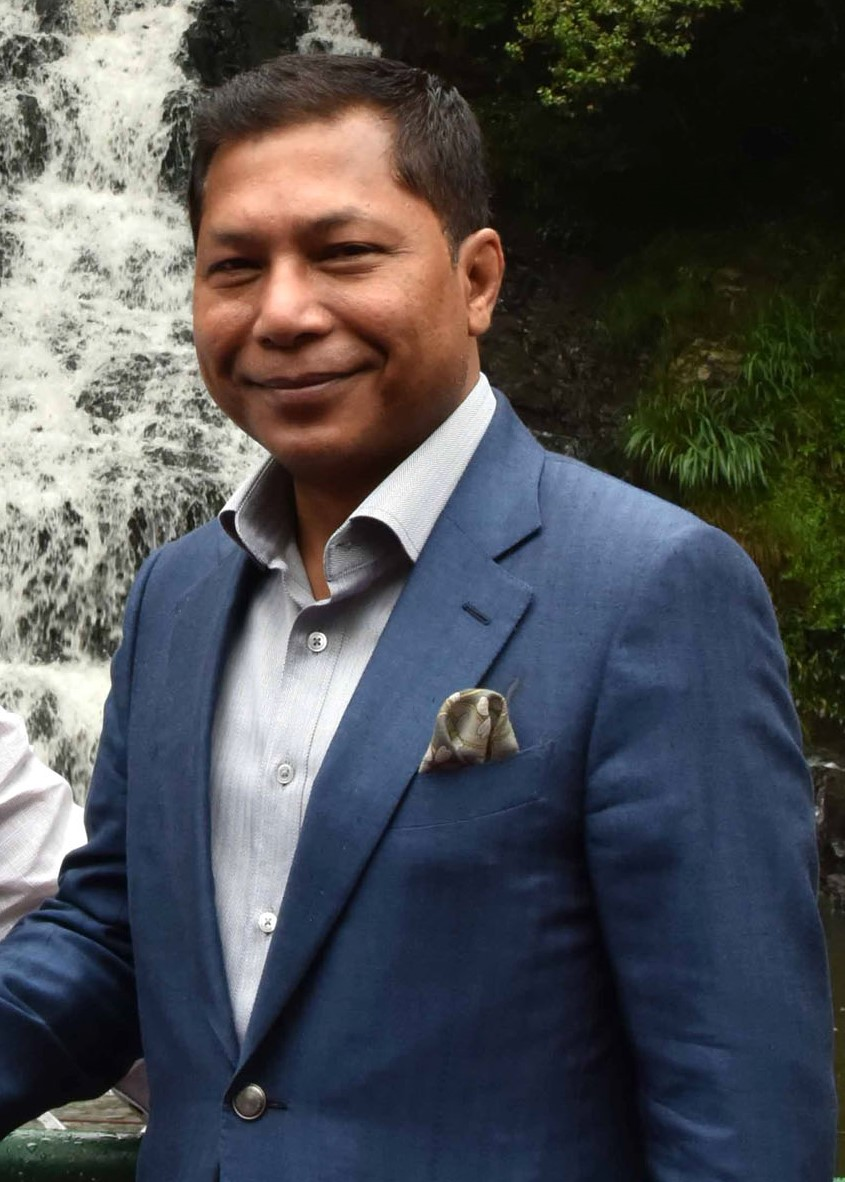

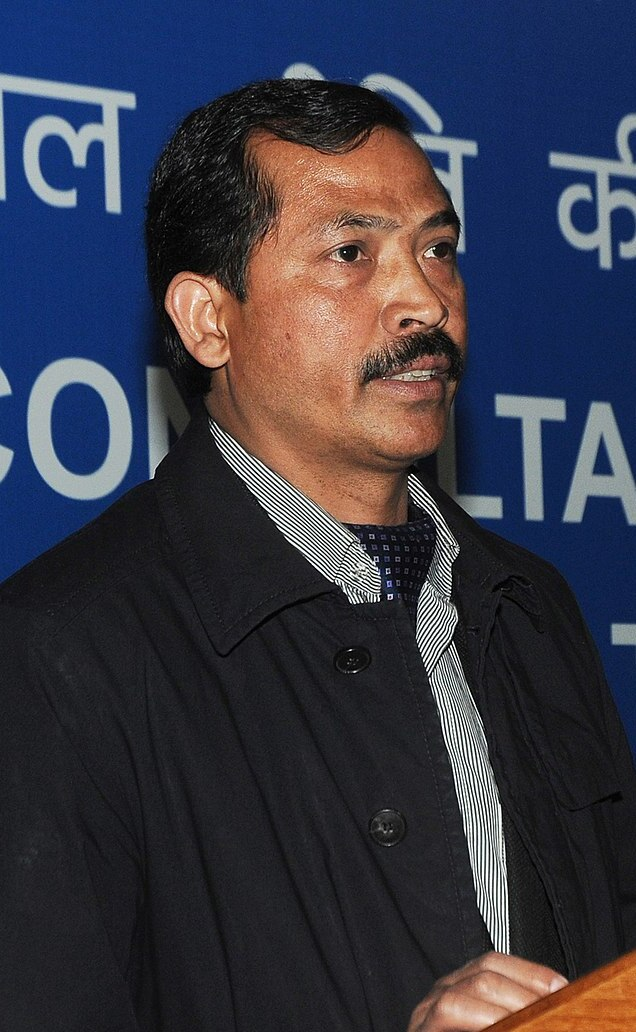

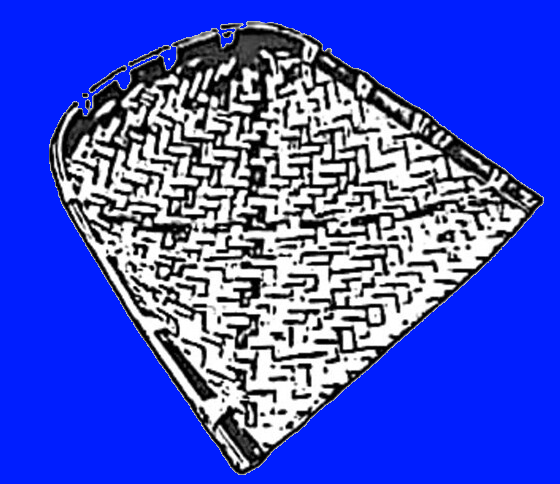

	Majority party	Minority party	Third party
Leader	Conrad Sangma	Metbah Lyngdoh	Mukul Sangma
Party	NPP	UDP	AITC
Leader since	2018	2019	2021
Leader's seat	South Tura (won)	Mairang	Songsak (won); Tikrikilla (lost)
Last election	20.60%, 20 seats	11.61%, 6 seats	0.35%, 0 seats
Seats won	26	12	5
Seat change	▲6	▲6	▲5
Popular vote	584,338	300,747	255,742
Percentage	31.42%	16.21%	13.79%
Swing	▲10.82 pp	▲4.69 pp	▲13.40 pp
	Fourth party	Fifth party	Sixth party
Leader	Vincent Pala	Ardent Basaiawmoit	Ernest Mawrie
Party	INC	VPP	BJP
Leader since	2021	2023	2023
Leader's seat	Sutnga Saipung (lost)	Nongkrem	West Shillong (lost)
Last election	28.50%, 21 seats	Did not contest	9.6%, 2 seats
Seats won	5	4	2
Seat change	▼16	New	Steady
Popular vote	243,841	101,264	173,043
Percentage	13.17%	7.49%	9.30%
Swing	▼15.33 pp	New	▼0.30 pp

- Structure of the Meghalaya Legislative Assembly after the election
Chief Minister before election
Conrad Sangma
NPP
Chief Minister after election
Conrad Sangma
NPP

Legislative Assembly elections were held in Meghalaya on 27 February 2023 to elect all 60 members of the Meghalaya Legislative Assembly. The votes were counted and the results were declared on 2 March 2023. The ruling NPP emerged as the single largest party and won 26 seats. It formed a government under the MDA.

== Background ==
The tenure of 10th Meghalaya Assembly is scheduled to end on 15 March 2023. The previous assembly elections were held in February 2018. After the election, a coalition led by the National People's Party formed the state government, with Conrad Sangma becoming Chief Minister.

== Schedule ==
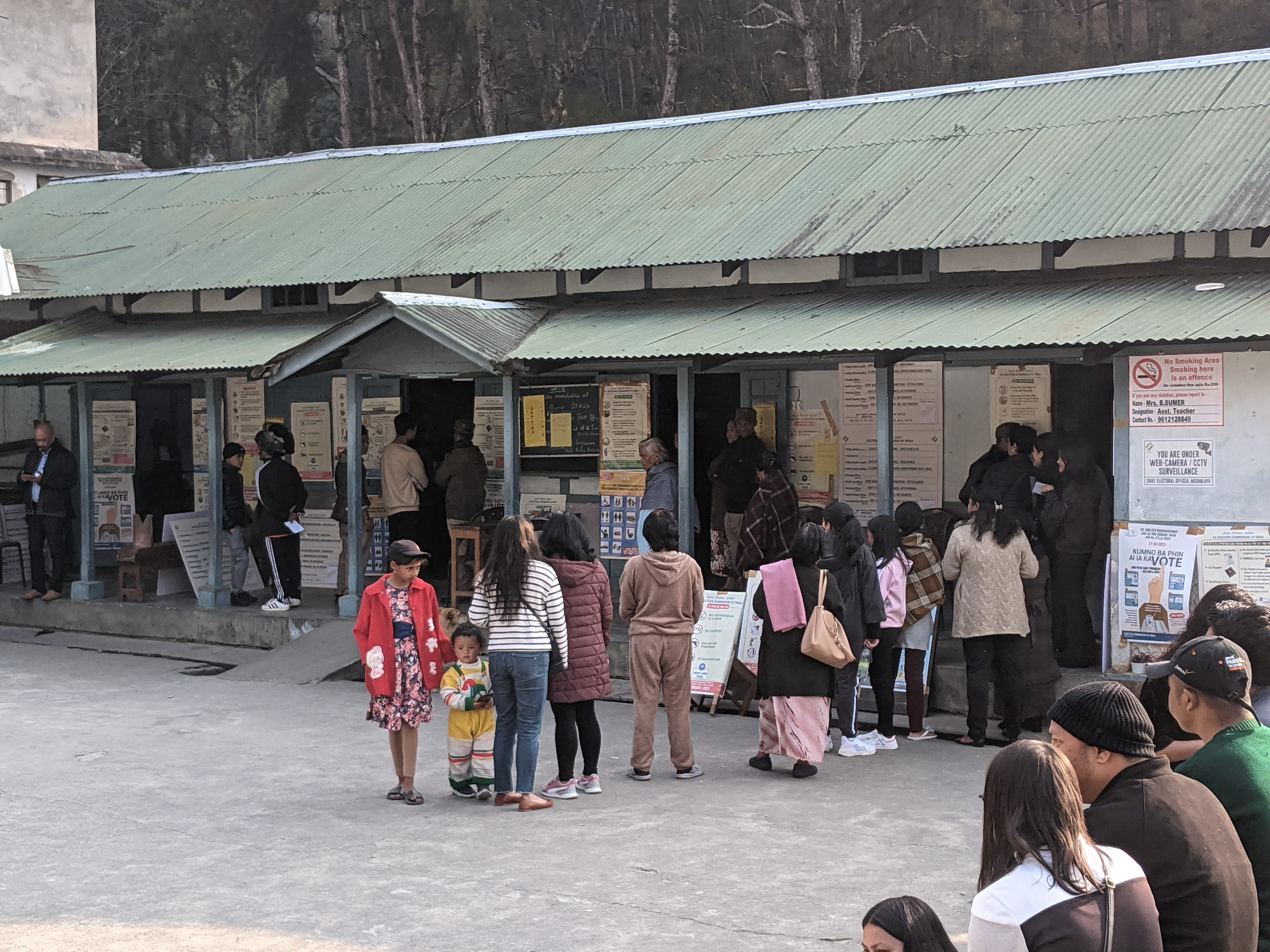
Women queueing to vote, Shillong, 27 February

The election schedule was announced by the Election Commission of India on 18 January 2023.

Poll event	Schedule
Notification date	31 January 2023
Last date for filing nomination	7 February 2023
Scrutiny of nomination	8 February 2023
Last date for withdrawal of nomination	10 February 2023
Date of poll	27 February 2023
Date of Counting of Votes	2 March 2023

== Parties ==
=== National People's Party ===
Party	Flag	Symbol	Leader	Photo	Seats contested
National People's Party			Conrad Sangma		57

=== All India Trinamool Congress ===
Party	Flag	Symbol	Leader	Photo	Seats contested
All India Trinamool Congress			Mukul Sangma		56

=== Bharatiya Janata Party ===
Party	Flag	Symbol	Leader	Seats contested
Bharatiya Janata Party			Ernest Mawrie	60

=== Indian National Congress ===
Party	Flag	Symbol	Leader	Photo	Seats contested
Indian National Congress			Vincent Pala	Vincent Pala	60

=== Others ===
Party	Flag	Symbol	Leader	Seats contested
United Democratic Party			Metbah Lyngdoh	46
Voice of the People Party			Ardent Miller Basaiawmoit	18
Hill State People's Democratic Party			KP Pangniang	11
People's Democratic Front			Gavin Miguel Mylliem	9
Republican Party of India (Athawale)				8
Janata Dal (United)				3
Garo National Council			Nikman Ch Marak	2
Republican Party of India				2

== Candidates ==
District	Constituency		NPP		INC		AITC		UDP		BJP	
District	#	Name	Party	Candidate	Party	Candidate	Party	Candidate	Party	Candidate	Party	Candidate
West Jaintia Hills	1	Nartiang (ST)	NPP	Sniawbhalang Dhar	INC	Emlang Laloo			UDP	Dawan Lyngdoh	BJP	Rimiki Sari
West Jaintia Hills	2	Jowai (ST)	NPP	Wailadmiki Shylla	INC	Daniel Den	AITC	A. Andrew Shullai	UDP	Moonlight Pariat	BJP	Allan Keith Suchiang
West Jaintia Hills	3	Raliang (ST)	NPP	Comingone Ymbon	INC	Richard Singh lyngdoh	AITC	Robinus Syngkon	UDP	J Treilang Suchiang	BJP	Lakhon Biam
West Jaintia Hills	4	Mowkaiaw (ST)	NPP	Habahun Dhar	INC	Nehemiah Tyngkan	AITC	Lasting Suchiang	UDP	Nujorki Sungoh	BJP	Currentis Rabon
East Jaintia Hills	5	Sutnga Saipung (ST)	NPP	Santa Mary Shylla	INC	Vincent Pala			UDP	Shitlang Pale	BJP	Krison Langstang
East Jaintia Hills	6	Khliehriat (ST)	NPP	Nehlang Lyngdoh	INC	smt. Jhanika siangshai	AITC	Sunida Bareh	UDP	Kyrmen Shylla	BJP	Bhayes Chyrmang
West Jaintia Hills	7	Amlarem (ST)	NPP	Stephanson Mukhim	INC	Arbiangkam khar sohmat	AITC	Alban K Gashnga	UDP	Lahkmen Rymbui	BJP	Firstborn Manner
Ri Bhoi	8	Mawhati (ST)	NPP	Shemphang Lyngdoh	INC	Charles Marngar	AITC	Saralin Dorphang	UDP	Baiahunlang Makdoh	BJP	Dr. Evarist Myrsing
Ri Bhoi	9	Nongpoh (ST)	NPP	Magdalyne Mawlong	INC	Rona Khymdeit	AITC	Hensing Bey	UDP	Mayralborn Syiem	BJP	Marian Maring
Ri Bhoi	10	Jirang (ST)	NPP	Sosthenes Sohtun	INC	Adrian Lambert	AITC	Sunmoon D Marak	UDP	Badhok Nongmalieh	BJP	Riya Sangma
Ri Bhoi	11	Umsning (ST)	NPP	Jason L Mawlong	INC	Dr Celestine Lyndoh	AITC	Gilbert Nongrum	UDP	Sunshine Makri	BJP	Duruth Majaw
Ri Bhoi	12	Umroi (ST)	NPP	Damanbait Lamare	INC	Stanliwis Rymbai	AITC	George B Lyngdoh			BJP	Shanbor Ramde
East Khasi Hills	13	Mawrengkneng (ST)	NPP	Pyniaid Sing Syiem	INC	Erson Marwein	AITC	Banshanlang Lawai	UDP	Osaphi Smithson Jyrwa	BJP	Highlander Kharmalki
East Khasi Hills	14	Pynthorumkhrah	NPP	Rocky Hek	INC	PN Syiem	AITC	Raymond Basaiawmoit			BJP	Alexander Laloo Hek
East Khasi Hills	15	Mawlai (ST)	NPP	Teibor Pathaw	INC	Marbud Dkhar	AITC	Stepbourne Kupar Ryndem	UDP	Process Sawkmie	BJP	Wandonbok Jyrwa
East Khasi Hills	16	East Shillong (ST)	NPP	Ampareen Lyngdoh	INC	Manuel Badwar	AITC	Ajoy Nongrum			BJP	Wankitbok Poshna
East Khasi Hills	17	North Shillong (ST)	NPP	Ransom Sutnga	INC	JA Lyngdoh	AITC	Elgiva Gwyneth Rynjah	UDP	Aman Warr	BJP	Mariahom Kharkrang
East Khasi Hills	18	West Shillong	NPP	Mohendro Rapsang	INC	Smt. Bethleen Dhkhar	AITC	Iwan Maria	UDP	Paul Lyngdoh	BJP	Ernest Mawrie
East Khasi Hills	19	South Shillong			INC	Venetia Pearl Mawlong	AITC	Ian A Lyngdoh Nongkynrih			BJP	Sanbor Shullai
East Khasi Hills	20	Mylliem (ST)	NPP	Hamletson Dohling	INC	RV Lyngdoh	AITC	Gilbert Guidingstar Laloo	UDP	Mitchel Wankhar	BJP	Samuel Hashah
East Khasi Hills	21	Nongthymmai (ST)	NPP	Jasmine Lyngdoh	INC	Banidashisha Kharkongor	AITC	Charles Pyngrope	UDP	Jemino Mawthoh	BJP	David Kharsati
East Khasi Hills	22	Nongkrem (ST)	NPP	Dasakhiat Lamare	INC	Sardonik Nongkhlaw	AITC	Joannes Lamphrang Lamare	UDP	Lambor Malngiang	BJP	David T. Kharkongor
East Khasi Hills	23	Sohiong (ST)	NPP	Samlin Malngiang	INC	S. Osborne Kharjana	AITC	Stodingstar Thabah	UDP	Synshar Lyngdoh Thabah	BJP	Seraph Eric Kharbuki
East Khasi Hills	24	Mawphlang (ST)	NPP	Kennedy Cornelius Khyriem	INC	Dannyson Kurbah	AITC	Mawkordor Rynjah	UDP	Matthew Beyondstar Kurbah	BJP	Wossaroi Rani
East Khasi Hills	25	Mawsynram (ST)	NPP	Alvin Khyriem Sawkmie	INC	Gopal Stone Hynniewta	AITC	Vincent T Sangma	UDP	Olan Singh Suin	BJP	Himalaya Muktan Shangpliang
East Khasi Hills	26	Shella (ST)	NPP	Grace Kharpuri	INC	Wellborn Bynnud	AITC	Playness Khiewtam	UDP	Balajied Kupar Synrem	BJP	Arena Hynnlewta
East Khasi Hills	27	Pynursla (ST)	NPP	Prestone Tynsong	INC	Nehru Suting	AITC	Edmund Khongngai	UDP	Anthony Khongwang	BJP	Rowelly Khongsni
East Khasi Hills	28	Sohra (ST)	NPP	Alan West Kharkongor	INC	Lakumtiew Sohkhlet	AITC	Harold Firming Khongsit	UDP	Titosstarwell Chyne	BJP	Micheal Ronnie Kshiar
East Khasi Hills	29	Mawkynrew (ST)	NPP	Kansing Lyngshiang	INC	Pynhunlung Nongrum	AITC	Dondor Marbaniang	UDP	Remington Pyngrope	BJP	Counsellor Mukhim
Eastern West Khasi Hills	30	Mairang (ST)			INC	Bat Skhem Ryntathaiang			UDP	Metbah Lyngdoh	BJP	Mark Rinaldy Sawkmie
Eastern West Khasi Hills	31	Mawthadraishan (ST)	NPP	Biolinda L Nonglait	INC	Fourteen Lyngkhoi			UDP	Brolding Nongsiej	BJP	Darikmen L. Marshillong
West Khasi Hills	32	Nongstoin (ST)	NPP	Macmillian Byrsat	INC	Gabriel Wahlang	AITC	Macmillan Kharbani	UDP	Polestar Nongsiej	BJP	Diosstarness Jyndiang
West Khasi Hills	33	Rambrai-Jyrngam (ST)	NPP	Kimfa S Marbaniang	INC	Goldenstar Nonglong	AITC	Fernandez S Dkhar			BJP	Spasterlin Nongrem
West Khasi Hills	34	Mawshynrut (ST)	NPP	Gigur Myrthong	INC	A.Charles Care	AITC	Justine G Momin			BJP	Bijoy Kynter
South West Khasi Hills	35	Ranikor (ST)			INC	Victorealness Syiemlieh	AITC	Tengsim G Momin	UDP	Pius Marwein	BJP	Martin Danggo
South West Khasi Hills	36	Mawkyrwat (ST)	NPP	H. Stalyne Diengdoh	INC	Carnes Sohshang	AITC	Sounder S Cajee	UDP	Renikton Lyngdoh Tongkhar	BJP	Bity Jyrwa
North Garo Hills	37	Kharkutta (ST)	NPP	Rupert M. Momin	INC	Chireng Peter R. Mark	AITC	Cherak Watre Momin	UDP	Luderberth Ch Momin	BJP	Elstone D. Marak
North Garo Hills	38	Mendipathar (ST)	NPP	Marthon J. Sangma	INC	Timjim K Momin	AITC	Pardinand D Shira	UDP	Subroto G Marak	BJP	Sengnab Ch. Momin
North Garo Hills	39	Resubelpara (ST)	NPP	Timothy D. Shira	INC	Dr.Tweel K. Marak	AITC	Rinaldo K Sangma	UDP	Taposh D Marak	BJP	Sukharan K. Sangma
North Garo Hills	40	Bajengdoba (ST)	NPP	Pongseng R. Marak	INC	Brifady Napak Marak	AITC	Tengrak R Marak	UDP	Rakman Ch Marak	BJP	Herrendro A. Sangma
East Garo Hills	41	Songsak (ST)	NPP	Nihim D. Shira	INC	Champion R Sangma	AITC	Mukul Sangma			BJP	Thomas N. Marak
East Garo Hills	42	Rongjeng (ST)	NPP	Jim M. Sangma	INC	Jeebing G. Momin	AITC	Sengnam R Marak	UDP	Andreash G Momin	BJP	Rapiush Ch. Sangma
East Garo Hills	43	Williamnagar (ST)	NPP	Marcuise N. Marak	INC	Deborah C Marak	AITC	Alphonsush R Marak			BJP	Raknang Ch. Momin
West Garo Hills	44	Raksamgre (ST)	NPP	Limison D. Sangma	INC	Frederick Sangma	AITC	Prabir D Sangma	UDP	Sushil Gayary	BJP	Benedic R. Marak
West Garo Hills	45	Tikrikilla (ST)	NPP	Jimmy Sangma	INC	Dr. Kapin Ch Boro	AITC	Mukul Sangma	UDP	Julius T. Sangma	BJP	Rahinath Barchung
West Garo Hills	46	Phulbari	NPP	Abu Taher Mondal	INC	Sailendra R. Sangma	AITC	S. G. Esmatur Mominin	UDP	Zinbaward N. Sangma	BJP	Edmond K. Sangma
West Garo Hills	47	Rajabala	NPP	Abdus Saleh	INC	Carla R. Sangma	AITC	Mizanur Rahman Kazi	UDP	Ashahel D Shira	BJP	Bakul Ch. Hajong
West Garo Hills	48	Selsella (ST)	NPP	Arbinstone Marak	INC	Reynold M sangma	AITC	Agassi R Marak	UDP	Subhankar Koch	BJP	Ferlin C.A. Sangma
West Garo Hills	49	Dadenggre (ST)	NPP	James Sangma	INC	Augustine D Marak	AITC	Rupa M Marak			BJP	Braining R. Marak
West Garo Hills	50	North Tura (ST)	NPP	Thomas A. Sangma	INC	Billykid A Sangma	AITC	Rupert M Sangma	UDP	Pilne A Sangma	BJP	Adamkid M. Sangma
West Garo Hills	51	South Tura (ST)	NPP	Conrad Sangma	INC	Brenield ch. marak	AITC	Richard Mrong Marak	UDP	John Leslee Sangma	BJP	Bernard N. Marak
West Garo Hills	52	Rangsakona (ST)	NPP	Subir Marak	INC	Edmund S Sangma	AITC	Zenith Sangma	UDP	Bipul Sangma	BJP	Dipul R. Marak
South West Garo Hills	53	Ampati (ST)	NPP	Stevie M Marak	INC	Uttora G Sangma	AITC	Miani D Shira			BJP	Premananda Koch
South West Garo Hills	54	Mahendraganj (ST)	NPP	Sanjay A. Sangma	INC	Sayeedullah Nongrum	AITC	Dikkanchi Dalbot Shira			BJP	Tingku N. Marak
South West Garo Hills	55	Salmanpara (ST)	NPP	Ian Botham Sangma	INC	Sinbath Ch. Marak	AITC	Winnerson D Sangma	UDP	Ronald Rikman Sangma	BJP	Boston Marak
West Garo Hills	56	Gambegre (ST)	NPP	Rakesh A. Sangma	INC	Saleng A. Sangma	AITC	Sadhiarani M Sangma			BJP	Daniel M. Sangma
West Garo Hills	57	Dalu (ST)	NPP	Brening Sangma	INC	Roger Benny A Sangma	AITC	Sengkal A Sangma	UDP	Kennethson R Sangma	BJP	Akki A. Sangma
South Garo Hills	58	Rongara Siju (ST)	NPP	Rakkam A. Sangma	INC	Rophul S Marak	AITC	Rajesh M Marak	UDP	Teseng Sangma	BJP	Calis G. Momin
South Garo Hills	59	Chokpot (ST)	NPP	Sengchim N. Sangma	INC	Karak R Sangma	AITC	Lazarus M Sangma			BJP	Novembirth Ch. Marak
South Garo Hills	60	Baghmara (ST)	NPP	Satto R. Marak	INC	Alphonse Ch sangma	AITC	Saljangringrang R Marak			BJP	Samuel M. Sangma

== Issues ==
=== Separate state demands ===
Meghalaya state regional parties such as GNC and HSPDP demanded separate state for Garo Hills and Khasi-Jaintia Hills respectively.

== Campaigns ==
=== National People's Party ===
The National People's Party launched its campaign on 23 January 2023 in Adokgre, North Garo Hills district. Meghalaya chief minister & NPP national president Conrad Sangma termed the TMC an outsider party in Meghalaya and said that TMC leaders were ready to leave their party after the election.

Manifesto

- Creation of 5 lakh jobs over the next five years.
- Special focus on entrepreneurship, tourism, agro-processing and knowledge/digital sectors in both the urban and rural areas of the state.
- Skilling of youths through the creation of multi-sectoral skill parks, exposure trips and livelihood sectors.
- Creation of 1,000 Chief Minister's Facilitation Centers to deliver government services to every village.
- Affordable Drug Centers have been planned to provide affordable medicines to the people.

=== All India Trinamool Congress ===
The All India Trinamool Congress supremo Mamata Banerjee launched the party's campaign on 18 January 2023 in Mendipathar of North Garo Hills district. Banerjee slammed the MDA government, dubbing it a proxy government from Delhi and also Guwahati, in a veiled reference to Assam chief minister Himanta Biswa Sarma. She also praised her government in Bengal.

Manifesto

- TMC manifesto promises 3 lakh jobs in 5 years, with a monthly allowance of Rs. 1000 for unemployed youth aged 21-40 under MYE scheme.
- Rs. 10,000 annual financial assistance to farmers (under Farmer Assistance for Rural Meghalaya)
- The manifesto promises job cards and a monthly transfer of Rs 1000 to female tourism workers and households through the MFI WE scheme.
- The TMC manifesto promises e-ration cards, financial assistance to farmers, social security, maternal and child care centers, medical facilities, piped drinking water, road upgrades and better healthcare services.
- Focussing on the health sector, the manifesto promised Maternal and Child Care centres in every block to provide efficient parental and post-natal services. The manifesto has also promised the recruitment of specialist doctors, the establishment of new Medical Colleges, and ensuring quality tertiary healthcare facilities.
- On the civic amenities front, the TMC has promised facilitation of Piped drinking water connections to all households. All the 6,459 villages of the state will be connected with black topped motorable roads and the manifesto has promised the upgrade of major arterial roads.

=== Indian National Congress ===
Manifesto

- Monthly assistance of Rs 3000 to single below poverty line (BPL) mothers.
- A job for every household.
- Drug and corruption-free state along with a transparency law. Opening of 50 new de-addiction centres statewide.
- Uninterrupted power supply.
- Uploading of all government files related to development and infrastructure for public scrutiny.

== Incidents ==
On 25 January 2023, Meghalaya PCC Member of District Council (MDC) from Mawkyrkat, Carness Sohsang claimed that the TMC offered him and 5 other Congress MDCs crores of rupees to leave Congress and join TMC. He also alleged that the NPP-UDP coalition had attempted to poach Congress MDCs previously as well.

== Surveys & Polls ==
Election Commission of India has banned exit polls for the period between 7am on 16 February to 7pm on 27 February, 2023.

Polling agency						
Polling agency	NPP	AITC	UDP	INC	BJP	Others
Zee News-Matrize	21-26	8-13	5-6	3-6	6-11	5-8
India Today-Axis My India	18-24	5-9	8-12	6-12	4-8	4-8
Times Now-ETG	18-26	8-14	8-14	2-5	3-6	4-9
India News-Jan Ki Baat	11-16	9-14	10-14	6-11	3-7	5-12
Poll of Polls (Average)	20	11	10	6	6	7
Actual Result	26	5	11	5	2	10

== Results ==
=== Results by parties ===
Results
Party	Popular vote			Seats		
Party	Votes	%	±pp	Contested	Won	+/−
National People's Party	584,338	31.49	▲11.43	56	26	▲6
United Democratic Party	300,747	16.21	▲4.61	45	12	▲6
All India Trinamool Congress	255,742	13.78	▲13.38	55	5	▲5
Indian National Congress	243,841	13.14	▼15.36	59	5	▼16
Voice of the People Party	101,264	5.46	New	18	4	New
Bharatiya Janata Party	173,043	9.33	▼0.27	59	2	Steady
Hill State People's Democratic Party	65,989	3.56	▼1.74	10	2	Steady
People's Democratic Front	34,974	1.88	▼6.32	9	2	▼2
Garo National Council	9290	0.53	▼0.9	2	0	Steady
Independents	66704	3.6	TBD		2	▼1
Others	TBD	0.23	TBD		0	▼1
NOTA	14,680	0.79	TBD			
Total		100%				
Valid votes						
Invalid votes						
Votes cast/ turnout						
Abstentions						
Registered voters						

=== Results by division ===
Divisions	Seats							
Divisions	Seats	NPP	UDP	TMC	INC	VPP	BJP	OTH
Tura	24	18	—N/a	4	1	—N/a	—N/a	1
Shillong	36	8	12	1	4	4	2	5
Total	60	26	12	5	5	4	2	6

=== Results by district ===
Divisions	District	Seats							
Divisions	District	Seats	NPP	UDP	TMC	INC	VPP	BJP	OTH
Tura	North Garo Hills	4	4	—N/a	—N/a	—N/a	—N/a	—N/a	—N/a
Tura	East Garo Hills	3	2	—N/a	1	—N/a	—N/a	—N/a	—N/a
Tura	South Garo Hills	3	2	—N/a	—N/a	—N/a	—N/a	—N/a	1
Tura	West Garo Hills	11	8	—N/a	2	1	—N/a	—N/a	—N/a
Tura	South West Garo Hills	3	2	—N/a	1	—N/a	—N/a	—N/a	—N/a
Shillong	West Jaintia Hills	5	3	2	—N/a	—N/a	—N/a	—N/a	—N/a
Shillong	East Jaintia Hills	2	1	1	—N/a	—N/a	—N/a	—N/a	—N/a
Shillong	East Khasi Hills	17	2	5	1	1	4	2	2
Shillong	West Khasi Hills	3	—N/a	—N/a	—N/a	1	—N/a	—N/a	2
Shillong	South West Khasi Hills	2	—N/a	2	—N/a	—N/a	—N/a	—N/a	—N/a
Shillong	Eastern West Khasi Hills	2	—N/a	1	—N/a	—N/a	—N/a	—N/a	1
Shillong	Ri Bhoi	5	2	1	—N/a	2	—N/a	—N/a	—N/a
Total		60	26	12	5	5	4	2	7

=== Results by constituency ===
District	Constituency		Winner				Runner-up				Margin
District	No.	Name	Candidate	Party	Votes	%	Candidate	Party	Votes	%	Margin
West Jaintia Hills	1	Nartiang (ST)	Sniawbhalang Dhar	NPP	16,969	41.56	Emang Laloo	INC	14,846	36.36	2,123
West Jaintia Hills	2	Jowai (ST)	Wailadmiki Shylla	NPP	14,079	38.35	Awhai Andrew Shullai	AITC	11,412	31.08	2,667
West Jaintia Hills	3	Raliang (ST)	Comingone Ymbon	NPP	13,626	38.43	Lakhon Biam	BJP	8,289	23.37	5,337
West Jaintia Hills	4	Mowkaiaw (ST)	Nujorki Sungoh	UDP	14,508	39.48	Habahun Dkhar	NPP	10,607	28.86	3,901
East Jaintia Hills	5	Sutnga Saipung (ST)	Santa Mary Shylla	NPP	16,974	39.10	Vincent Pala	INC	14,866	34.89	2,108
East Jaintia Hills	6	Khliehriat (ST)	Kyrmen Shylla	UDP	23,514	54.95	Nehlang Lyngdoh	NPP	17,908	41.85	5,606
West Jaintia Hills	7	Amlarem (ST)	Lahkmen Rymbui	UDP	17,803	49.15	Stephanson Mukhim	NPP	17,746	48.99	57
Ri Bhoi	8	Mawhati (ST)	Charles Marngar	INC	13,273	37.38	Shemphang Lyngdoh	NPP	8,029	22.61	5,244
Ri Bhoi	9	Nongpoh (ST)	Mayralborn Syiem	UDP	14,940	45.44	Rona Khymdeit	INC	8,254	25.11	6,137
Ri Bhoi	10	Jirang (ST)	Sosthenes Sohtun	NPP	12,690	36.41	Adrian Lambert Mylleim	INC	11,067	31.76	1,623
Ri Bhoi	11	Umsning (ST)	Celestine Lyngdoh	INC	9,907	29.31	Sunshine Makri	UDP	8,743	25.86	1,164
Ri Bhoi	12	Umroi (ST)	Damanbait Lamare	NPP	14,213	49.80	George B. Lyngdoh	AITC	12,527	43.89	1,686
East Khasi Hills	13	Mawrengkneng (ST)	Heaving Stone Kharpran	VPP	11,424	33.09	Osaphi Smithson Jyrwa	UDP	10,182	29.49	1,242
East Khasi Hills	14	Pynthorumkhrah	Alexander Laloo Hek	BJP	9,321	35.70	Pynshngain Syiem	INC	6,783	25.98	2,538
East Khasi Hills	15	Mawlai (ST)	Brightstarwell Marbaniang	VPP	24,262	59.54	Teiborlang Pathaw	NPP	8,614	21.14	15,648
East Khasi Hills	16	East Shillong (ST)	Ampareen Lyngdoh	NPP	6,637	38.96	Manuel Badwar	INC	4,926	28.92	1,711
East Khasi Hills	17	North Shillong (ST)	Adelbert Nongrum	VPP	5,583	29.45	Mariahom Kharkrang	BJP	4,550	24.00	1,033
East Khasi Hills	18	West Shillong	Paul Lyngdoh	UDP	7,917	42.14	Mohendro Rapsang	NPP	4,432	23.59	3,485
East Khasi Hills	19	South Shillong	Sanbor Shullai	BJP	14,213	65.74	Danny Langstheih	VPP	2,604	12.04	11,609
East Khasi Hills	20	Mylliem (ST)	Ronnie V. Lyngdoh	INC	8,904	28.69	Aibandaplin F. Lyngdoh	VPP	8,866	28.56	38
East Khasi Hills	21	Nongthymmai (ST)	Charles Pyngrope	AITC	7,452	29.78	Jemino Mawthoh	UDP	6,253	24.99	1,199
East Khasi Hills	22	Nongkrem (ST)	Ardent Miller Basaiawmoit	VPP	13,286	40.77	Lambor Malngiang	UDP	9,099	27.92	4,187
East Khasi Hills	23	Sohiong (ST)	Synshar Lyngdoh Thabah	UDP	16,679	51.85	Samlin Malngiang	NPP	13,257	41.22	3,422
East Khasi Hills	24	Mawphlang (ST)	Matthew Beyondstar Kurbah	UDP	6,690	21.40	Auspicious Lyngdoh Mawphlang	PDF	6,586	21.07	104
East Khasi Hills	25	Mawsynram (ST)	Ollan Singh Suin	UDP	10,987	33.23	Himalaya Muktan Shangpliang	BJP	10,032	30.34	955
East Khasi Hills	26	Shella (ST)	Balajied Kupar Synrem	UDP	13,274	43.36	Grace Mary Kharpuri	NPP	12,840	41.94	434
East Khasi Hills	27	Pynursla (ST)	Prestone Tysong	NPP	13,745	39.54	Nehru Suting	INC	5,605	16.12	8,140
East Khasi Hills	28	Sohra (ST)	Gavin Miguel Mylliem	PDF	11,358	42.31	Titosstar Well Chyne	UDP	11,343	42.25	15
East Khasi Hills	29	Mawkynrew (ST)	Banteidor Lyngdoh	PDF	11,789	35.24	Martle N. Mukhim	HSPDP	7,652	22.87	4,137
Eastern West Khasi Hills	30	Mairang (ST)	Metbah Lyngdoh	UDP	19,066	48.54	Batskhem Ryntathiang	INC	18,911	48.14	155
Eastern West Khasi Hills	31	Mawthadraishan (ST)	Shakliar Warjri	HSPDP	17,366	42.63	Brodling Nongsiej	UDP	15013	36.85	2,353
West Khasi Hills	32	Nongstoin (ST)	Gabriel Wahlang	INC	13,847	35.17	Macmillan Byrsat	NPP	11,223	28.51	2,624
West Khasi Hills	33	Rambrai-Jyrngam (ST)	Remington Gabil Momin	Ind	9,057	26.60	K. Phlastingwell Pangiang	HSPDP	8,947	26.27	110
West Khasi Hills	34	Mawshynrut (ST)	Methodius Dkhar	HSPDP	19,368	52.50	Gigur Myrthong	NPP	14,181	38.44	5,187
South West Khasi Hills	35	Ranikor (ST)	Pius Marwein	UDP	16,502	50.74	Martin M. Danggo	BJP	10,853	33.37	5,649
South West Khasi Hills	36	Mawkyrwat (ST)	Renikton Lyngdoh Tongkhar	UDP	10,678	31.13	Carnes Sohshang	INC	9,406	27.42	1,272
North Garo Hills	37	Kharkutta (ST)	Rupert Momin	NPP	17,426	47.03	Cherak Watre Momin	AITC	15,896	42.90	1,530
North Garo Hills	38	Mendipathar (ST)	Marthon J. Sangma	NPP	9,363	37.56	Timjim K. Momin	INC	5,538	22.21	3,825
North Garo Hills	39	Resubelpara (ST)	Timothy J. Shira	NPP	10,948	41.30	Rinaldo K. Sangma	AITC	7,483	28.23	3,465
North Garo Hills	40	Bajengdoba (ST)	Pongseng Marak	NPP	9,900	34.23	Brigady Napak Marak	INC	7,584	26.22	2,316
East Garo Hills	41	Songsak (ST)	Mukul Sangma	AITC	12,689	44.51	Nihim D. Shira	NPP	12,317	43.21	372
East Garo Hills	42	Rongjeng (ST)	Jim M. Sangma	NPP	8,836	29.32	Walseng M. Sangma	Ind	8,708	28.89	128
East Garo Hills	43	Williamnagar (ST)	Marcuise N. Marak	NPP	10,976	36.90	Deborah C. Marak	INC	7,133	23.98	3,843
West Garo Hills	44	Raksamgre (ST)	Limison D. Sangma	NPP	12,184	44.06	Benedic R. Marak	BJP	9,366	33.87	2,818
West Garo Hills	45	Tikrikilla (ST)	Jimmy D. Sangma	NPP	13,218	41.42	Mukul Sangma	AITC	7,905	24.77	5,313
West Garo Hills	46	Phulbari	Abu Taher Mondal	NPP	14,969	50.64	S. G. Esmatur Mominin	AITC	11,729	39.68	3,240
West Garo Hills	47	Rajabala	Mizanur Rahman Kazi	AITC	12,628	37.89	Md. Abdus Saleh	NPP	12,618	37.86	10
West Garo Hills	48	Selsella (ST)	Arbinstone B. Marak	NPP	16,595	49.86	Agassi R. Marak	AITC	7,854	23.60	8,741
West Garo Hills	49	Dadenggre (ST)	Rupa M. Marak	AITC	15,702	47.70	James Sangma	NPP	15,684	47.64	18
West Garo Hills	50	North Tura (ST)	Thomas A. Sangma	NPP	11,385	42.34	Adam Kid M. Sangma	BJP	7,500	27.89	3,885
West Garo Hills	51	South Tura (ST)	Conrad Sangma	NPP	13,342	52.04	Bernard N. Marak	BJP	8,326	32.48	5,016
West Garo Hills	52	Rangsakona (ST)	Subir Marak	NPP	13,605	41.71	Zenith M. Sangma	AITC	12,817	39.30	788
South West Garo Hills	53	Ampati (ST)	Miani D Shira	AITC	13,446	44.69	Stevie M. Marak	NPP	11,169	37.12	2,277
South West Garo Hills	54	Mahendraganj (ST)	Sanjay A. Sangma	NPP	13,560	41.25	Dikkanchi D. Shira	AITC	11,842	36.03	1,718
South West Garo Hills	55	Salmanpara (ST)	Ian Botham Sangma	NPP	11,352	41.84	Winnerson D. Sangma	AITC	6,114	22.54	5,238
West Garo Hills	56	Gambegre (ST)	Saleng A. Sangma	INC	11,252	39.57	Sadhiarani M. Sangma	AITC	8,381	29.48	2,871
West Garo Hills	57	Dalu (ST)	Brening A. Sangma	NPP	5,834	30.80	Akki A. Sangma	BJP	5,307	28.02	527
South Garo Hills	58	Rongara Siju (ST)	Rakkam A Sangma	NPP	11,569	39.31	Rophul S. Marak	INC	8,311	28.24	3,258
South Garo Hills	59	Chokpot (ST)	Sengchim N. Sangma	NPP	9,503	33.33	Nikman Ch. Marak	GNC	9,150	32.09	353
South Garo Hills	60	Baghmara (ST)	Kartush R. Marak	Ind	9,013	30.90	Samuel M. Sangma	BJP	6,788	23.27	2,225

== Government formation ==
NPP chief Conrad Sangma gave resignation from the post of Chief Minister to Governor Phagu Chauhan. He staked his claim on a new government with support of 32 MLAs (26 NPP, 2 BJP, 2 HSPDP, and 2 Independents). However, later in the evening, HSPDP withdrew their support which reduced the NPP-led MDA tally to 30. The opposition parties with 29 MLAs counter-claimed to form a United Front. Leaders of TMC, Congress, PDF, HSPDP, VPP had meeting with UDP leader Lahkmen Rymbui to form alternative government barring MDA alliance consists NPP and BJP. Later UDP, PDF and HSPDP pledged support to a NPP-BJP-Independent MDA alliance.

== Bypolls in Meghalaya (2023-2028) ==
Date	Constituency		Previous MLA		Reason	Elected MLA	Party
13 November 2024	56	Gambegre	Saleng A. Sangma	Indian National Congress	Elected to Lok Sabha on 4 June	Mehtab Chandee Agitok Sangma	National People's Party

== See also ==
- 2023 elections in India
- Elections in Meghalaya
- 2025 Khasi Hills Autonomous District Council election
