= Dikkanchi Shira =

Indian politician (born 1966)

Dikkanchi Shira (born 1966) is an Indian politician from Meghalaya. She is a former two time member of the Meghalaya Legislative Assembly from the Mahendraganj Assembly constituency which is reserved for the Scheduled Tribe community in the South West Garo Hills district representing the Indian National Congress.

== Early life ==
Shira is from Ampati, South West Garo Hills district, Meghalaya. She married Mukul Sangma. She completed her B.A. In 1988 at a college affiliated with the North Easter Hills University. She declared assets worth Rs.13 crore in 2018, and Rs.28 crore in 2023 in her affidavits to the Election Commission of India.

== Career ==
Shira won the Mahendraganj Assembly constituency in the 2013 Meghalaya Legislative Assembly election representing the Indian National Congress. She polled 11,580 and defeated her nearest rival, Nimarson Momin of the United Democratic Party (Meghalaya), by 6,859 votes. She retained the seat for the Indian National Congress winning the 2018 Meghalaya Legislative Assembly election where she garnered 14,292 votes and beat her closest opponent, Premananda Koch of the Bharatiya Janata Party, by 8,085 votes. She later shifter to the All India Trinamool Congress and contested the 2023 Meghalaya Legislative Assembly election on AITC ticket but lost to Sanjay Sangma of the NPP by 1718 votes.
