= Mawkynrew Assembly constituency =

Legislative Assembly constituency in Meghalaya State, India

Coordinates: 25.43°N 92°E

Mawkynrew
- Constituency No. 29 for the Meghalaya Legislative Assembly

Constituency details
- Country: India
- Region: Northeast India
- State: Meghalaya
- District: East Khasi Hills
- Lok Sabha constituency: Shillong
- Established: 2008
- Total electors: 37,189
- Reservation: ST

Member of Legislative Assembly
- 11th Meghalaya Legislative Assembly
- Incumbent Banteidor Lyngdoh
- Party: NPP
- Alliance: NDA
- Elected year: 2023

Mawkynrew is one of the 60 Legislative Assembly constituencies of Meghalaya state in India. It is part of East Khasi Hills district and is reserved for candidates belonging to the Scheduled Tribes. It was created after the passing of the Delimitation of Parliamentary and Assembly constituencies, 2008 and had its first election in 2013. As of 2023, its representative is Banteidor Lyngdoh of the National People's Party party.

== Members of the Legislative Assembly ==
Election	Name	Party
2013	Remington Pyngrope	United Democratic Party
2018	Banteidor Lyngdoh	People's Democratic Front
2023	Banteidor Lyngdoh	People's Democratic Front

== Election results ==
=== Assembly Election 2023 ===
2023 Meghalaya Legislative Assembly election: Mawkynrew
Party	Candidate	Votes	%	±%
PDF	Banteidor Lyngdoh	11,789	35.50%	▲3.67
HSPDP	Martle Mukhim	7,652	23.04%	▼6.89
NPP	Kansing Lyngshiang	7,360	22.16%	▲1.58
UDP	Remington Pyngrope	5,385	16.22%	New
INC	Pynhunlang Nongrum	465	1.40%	▼13.34
AITC	Dondor Marbaniang	463	1.39%	New
NOTA	None of the Above	247	0.74%	▲0.26
Margin of victory		4,137	12.46%	▲10.56
Turnout		33,207	89.29%	▲3.42
Registered electors		37,189		▲19.33
PDF hold		Swing	▲3.67	

=== Assembly Election 2018 ===
2018 Meghalaya Legislative Assembly election: Mawkynrew
Party	Candidate	Votes	%	±%
PDF	Banteidor Lyngdoh	8,519	31.83%	New
HSPDP	Martle Mukhim	8,010	29.93%	New
NPP	Remington Pyngrope	5,508	20.58%	New
INC	Olet Kharsohnoh	3,945	14.74%	▼7.99
KHNAM	Lamborskhem Kharpuri	364	1.36%	New
Independent	Dwin Singh Lynshiang	221	0.83%	New
NOTA	None of the Above	130	0.49%	New
Margin of victory		509	1.90%	▲0.07
Turnout		26,762	85.87%	▼6.36
Registered electors		31,165		▲20.27
PDF gain from UDP		Swing	▲4.58	

=== Assembly Election 2013 ===
2013 Meghalaya Legislative Assembly election: Mawkynrew
Party	Candidate	Votes	%	±%
UDP	Remington Pyngrope	6,513	27.25%	New
Independent	Banteidor Lyngdoh	6,076	25.42%	New
MDP	Martle Mukhim	5,879	24.60%	New
INC	Drosing K. Khongjoh	5,432	22.73%	New
Margin of victory		437	1.83%	
Turnout		23,900	92.24%	
Registered electors		25,912		
UDP win (new seat)				

== See also ==
- List of constituencies of the Meghalaya Legislative Assembly
- East Khasi Hills district
