= Meghalaya Legislative Assembly =

Unicameral legislature of the Indian state of Meghalaya

- 11th Meghalaya Assembly

Type
- Type: Unicameral
- Term limits: 5 years

History
- Founded: 4 April 1970 (56 years ago)

Leadership
- Governor: C. H. Vijayashankar
- Speaker: Thomas A. Sangma, NPP since 9 March 2023
- Deputy Speaker: Limison D. Sangma, NPP since 12 September 2025
- Chief Minister (Leader of the House): Conrad Sangma, NPP since 6 March 2018
- Deputy Chief Minister: Prestone Tynsong, Sniawbhalang Dhar, NPP since 7 March 2023
- Leader of the Opposition: Mukul Sangma, MAITC since August 28 2024

Structure
- Seats: 60
- Political groups: Government (50) MDA (50): NPP (36); BJP (10); HSPDP (2); IND (2); Opposition (10): MAITC (5); VPP (4); UDP (1)

Elections
- Voting system: First past the post
- Last election: 27 February 2023
- Next election: 2028

Meeting place
- Vidhana Bhavan, Shillong, Meghalaya, India

Website
- http://megassembly.gov.in/

The Meghalaya Legislative Assembly is the unicameral legislature of the Indian state of Meghalaya.

Constituted as a directly elected body in 1972, it has 60 members, filled through direct elections held every five years. Like other Indian states, Meghalaya has a parliamentary system of government. The executive branch of the Meghalaya Government is derived from the Legislative Assembly.

== History ==
In independent India, the areas now constituting the state of Meghalaya were part of the state of Assam and represented in the Assam Legislative Assembly. The Indian Parliament passed the Assam Reorganisation (Meghalaya) Act in 1969, which led to the establishment of an autonomous state of Meghalaya within Assam on 2 April 1970. A legislature of 37 members for the new autonomous state was established, with representatives elected indirectly by the autonomous direct councils. The first sitting of the assembly took place in Tura on 14 April 1970. In 1971, the Indian Parliament passed the North-Eastern Areas (Reorganisation) Act, which converted Meghalaya from an autonomous state within Assam to a full member state of the Indian Union. The State of Meghalaya was officially formed on 21 January 1972. The Legislative Assembly was then reconstituted as a directly elected body.

The regions of Meghalaya are represented in the Assembly, with 29 members elected from Khasi Hills, 7 from Jaintia Hills and 24 from Garo Hills.

== List of Assemblies ==
The following is the list of all the Meghalaya Legislative Assemblies:

| Assembly | Term of Assembly | | Speaker | Term of Speaker | | Leader of House (Chief Minister) | Term of Leader of House | | Party of Leader of House (Note: This column only names the chief minister's party. The state government he headed may have been a complex coalition of several parties and independents; these are not listed here.) | Remarks |
|---|---|---|---|---|---|---|---|---|---|---|
| 1st Assembly | 1972 | 1978 | R. S. Lyngdoh | 25 March 1972 | 1978 | Williamson A. Sangma | 18 March 1972 | 21 November 1976 | All Party Hill Leaders Conference (APHLC) | --- |
| 1st Assembly | 1972 | 1978 | R. S. Lyngdoh | 25 March 1972 | 1978 | Williamson A. Sangma | 22 November 1976 | 3 March 1978 | Indian National Congress (INC) | --- |
| 2nd Assembly | 1978 | 1983 | W. Syiemiong | 20 March 1978 | 1983 | D. D. Pugh | 10 March 1978 | 6 May 1979 | APHLC | --- |
| 2nd Assembly | 1978 | 1983 | W. Syiemiong | 20 March 1978 | 1983 | B. B. Lyngdoh | 7 May 1979 | 7 May 1981 | APHLC | --- |
| 2nd Assembly | 1978 | 1983 | W. Syiemiong | 20 March 1978 | 1983 | Williamson A. Sangma | 7 May 1981 | 24 February 1983 | INC | --- |
| 3rd Assembly | 1983 | 1988 | E. K. Mawlong | 9 March 1983 | 12 December 1988 | B. B. Lyngdoh | 2 March 1983 | 31 March 1983 | APHLC | --- |
| 3rd Assembly | 1983 | 1988 | E. K. Mawlong | 9 March 1983 | 12 December 1988 | Williamson A. Sangma | 2 April 1983 | 5 February 1988 | INC | --- |
| 4th Assembly | 1988 | 1993 | P. G. Marbaniang | 24 February 1988 | 15 December 1989 | Purno A. Sangma | 6 February 1988 | 25 March 1990 | INC | --- |
| 4th Assembly | 1988 | 1993 | P. R. Kyndiah | 20 December 1989 | 1993 | B. B. Lyngdoh | 26 March 1990 | 10 October 1991 | Hill People's Union | --- |
| 4th Assembly | 1988 | 1993 | President's Rule (Note: President's rule may be imposed when the "government in a state is not able to function as per the Constitution", which often happens because no party or coalition has a majority in the assembly. When President's rule is in force in a state, its council of ministers stands dissolved. The office of chief minister thus lies vacant, and the administration is taken over by the governor, who functions on behalf of the central government. At times, the legislative assembly also stands dissolved.) | | | | 11 October 1991 | 5 February 1992 | NA | --- |
| 4th Assembly | 1988 | 1993 | P. R. Kyndiah | 20 December 1989 | 1993 | D.D. Lapang | 5 February 1992 | 19 February 1993 | INC | --- |
| 5th Assembly | 1993 | 1998 | J. D. Rymbai | 12 October 1993 | 17 April 1997 | S. C. Marak | 19 February 1993 | 27 February 1998 | INC | --- |
| 5th Assembly | 1993 | 1998 | Monindra Rava | 22 July 1997 | 6 March 1998 | S. C. Marak | 19 February 1993 | 27 February 1998 | INC | --- |
| 6th Assembly | 1998 | 2003 | E. K. Mawlong | 10 March 1998 | 8 March 2000 | S. C. Marak | 27 February 1998 | 10 March 1998 | INC | Though the Leader was an independent, the government was a coalition of NCP, etc. Khonglam became the first independent Chief Minister of an Indian state in history. |
| 6th Assembly | 1998 | 2003 | E. K. Mawlong | 10 March 1998 | 8 March 2000 | B. B. Lyngdoh | 10 March 1998 | 14 October 1999 | INC | Though the Leader was an independent, the government was a coalition of NCP, etc. Khonglam became the first independent Chief Minister of an Indian state in history. |
| 6th Assembly | 1998 | 2003 | E. K. Mawlong | 10 March 1998 | 8 March 2000 | B. B. Lyngdoh | 14 October 1999 | 8 March 2000 | United Democratic Party (UDP) | Though the Leader was an independent, the government was a coalition of NCP, etc. Khonglam became the first independent Chief Minister of an Indian state in history. |
| 6th Assembly | 1998 | 2003 | E. D. Marak | 20 July 2000 | 2 March 2003 | | | | | Though the Leader was an independent, the government was a coalition of NCP, etc. Khonglam became the first independent Chief Minister of an Indian state in history. |
| 6th Assembly | 1998 | 2003 | E. D. Marak | 20 July 2000 | 2 March 2003 | E. K. Mawlong | 8 March 2000 | 8 December 2001 | United Democratic Party (UDP) | Though the Leader was an independent, the government was a coalition of NCP, etc. Khonglam became the first independent Chief Minister of an Indian state in history. |
| 6th Assembly | 1998 | 2003 | E. D. Marak | 20 July 2000 | 2 March 2003 | F. A. Khonglam | 8 December 2001 | 4 March 2003 | Independent | Though the Leader was an independent, the government was a coalition of NCP, etc. Khonglam became the first independent Chief Minister of an Indian state in history. |
| 7th Assembly | 2003 | 2008 | M. M. Danggo | 12 March 2003 | 7 March 2008 | D.D. Lapang | 4 March 2003 | 15 June 2006 | INC | --- |
| 7th Assembly | 2003 | 2008 | M. M. Danggo | 12 March 2003 | 7 March 2008 | J. D. Rymbai | 15 June 2006 | 10 March 2007 | INC | --- |
| 7th Assembly | 2003 | 2008 | M. M. Danggo | 12 March 2003 | 7 March 2008 | D.D. Lapang | 10 March 2007 | 7 March 2008 | INC | --- |
| 8th Assembly | 2008 | 2013 | Bindo Lanong | 20 March 2008 | 15 May 2009 | D. D. Lapang | 10 March 2008 | 19 March 2008 | INC | INC got the highest number of seats (25) but since no majority could be secured by it even after gaining 3 Independents' support, Lapang resigned as Chief Minister in less than 10 days. Then a coalition called Meghalaya Progressive Alliance was formed, comprising all non-Congress parties like NCP (15), UDP (11), HSPDP (2), KHNAM (1) and Independents (3), thus 33 in total, to form the government under Roy. However, the coalition barely survived a year and collapsed leading to promulgation of President's Rule. After a month, several parties of the Alliance left and supported Congress to form the government with Lapang again being sworn in as the Chief Minister. |
| 8th Assembly | 2008 | 2013 | Bindo Lanong | 20 March 2008 | 15 May 2009 | Donkupar Roy | 19 March 2008 | 19 March 2009 | United Democratic Party (UDP) | |
| 8th Assembly | 2008 | 2013 | President's Rule | | | | 19 March 2009 | 13 April 2009 | NA | |
| 8th Assembly | 2008 | 2013 | Charles Pyngrope | 25 May 2009 | ? | D. D. Lapang | 13 April 2009 | 18 April 2010 | INC | |
| 8th Assembly | 2008 | 2013 | Charles Pyngrope | 25 May 2009 | ? | Mukul Sangma | 20 April 2010 | 5 March 2013 | INC | |
| 9th Assembly | 2013 | 2018 | A. T. Mondal | March 2013 | March 2018 | Mukul Sangma | 5 March 2013 | 6 March 2018 | INC | --- |
| 10th Assembly | 2018 | 2023 | Donkupar Roy; Metbah Lyngdoh | 6 March 2018 | 5 March 2023 | Conrad Sangma | 6 March 2018 | 4 March 2023 | National People's Party (NPP) | The NDA government was formed by the coalition of 39 MLA's including NPP (20), UDP (8), PDF (4), HSPDP (2), BJP (2) and (2)Independents with Conrad Sangma as Leader of the House. |
| 11th Assembly | 2023 | Present | Thomas A. Sangma | 9 March 2023 | Present | Conrad Sangma | 7 March 2023 | Present | National People's Party (NPP) | The NDA government was formed by the coalition of 45 MLA's including NPP (26), UDP (11), PDF (2), HSPDP (2), BJP (2) and (2)Independents with Conrad Sangma as Leader of the House. |

== Committees ==
There are 15 committees in the Legislative Assembly of Meghalaya:

1. Business Advisory Committee: decides the time-table for assembly functions and for evaluation of legislation.
2. Committee on Petitions: responsible for examining petitions submitted to the assembly, collecting evidence and preparing reports.
3. Committee on Public Accounts: examines the budget, appropriations and auditing of state agencies, programmes and government.
4. Committee on Public Undertakings: responsible for monitoring and improving the workings of public sector undertakings such as government corporations, housing programmes and economic development schemes.
5. Committee on Estimates: evaluates statistics and estimates to improve the efficiency and administration of various government functions, agencies and programmes.
6. Committee Welfare of the Scheduled Tribes & Scheduled Castes: responsible for monitoring programmes aimed for the economic and social development of the scheduled castes, tribes and backward classes residing in the state of Meghalaya.
7. Committee of Privileges: examines any issues and violations of the privileges, conduct and benefits given to members of the assembly.
8. Committee on Subordinate Legislation: monitors if the state government's functions and legislation comply with the state constitution.
9. Committee on Government Assurances: monitors the reliability and fulfillment of targets and promises made by the chief minister and cabinet ministers.
10. Rules Committee: maintains the rules of business and code of conduct for members of the assembly.
11. House Committee: oversees the amenities for members of the assembly such as housing, food, health-care and transport.
12. Library Committee: is responsible for the maintenance and development of the state government and assembly library.
13. Select Committee: is charged with the examination and development of specific legislation, preparing it for final passage.
14. Committee on the Empowerment of Women: oversees schemes and programmes aimed to increase representation of women in society and economic sectors.
15. Budget Committee: examines budget proposals for various organs and departments of the state government.

== Members of Legislative Assembly ==
| District | No. | Constituency | Name | Party | | Remarks |
|---|---|---|---|---|---|---|
| West Jaintia Hills | 1 | Nartiang (ST) | Sniawbhalang Dhar | National People's Party | MDA | Deputy Chief Minister |
| West Jaintia Hills | 2 | Jowai (ST) | Wailadmiki Shylla | National People's Party | MDA | Cabinet Minister |
| West Jaintia Hills | 3 | Raliang (ST) | Comingone Ymbon | National People's Party | MDA | |
| West Jaintia Hills | 4 | Mowkaiaw (ST) | Nujorki Sungoh | National People's Party | MDA | Switched from UDP to NPP |
| East Jaintia Hills | 5 | Sutnga Saipung (ST) | Santa Mary Shylla | National People's Party | MDA | |
| East Jaintia Hills | 6 | Khliehriat (ST) | Kyrmen Shylla | Bharatiya Janata Party | MDA | Switched from UDP to BJP |
| West Jaintia Hills | 7 | Amlarem (ST) | Lahkmen Rymbui | Bharatiya Janata Party | MDA | Cabinet Minister; Switched from UDP to BJP |
| Ri Bhoi | 8 | Mawhati (ST) | Charles Marngar | National People's Party | MDA | Switched from INC to NPP |
| Ri Bhoi | 9 | Nongpoh (ST) | Mayralborn Syiem | Bharatiya Janata Party | MDA | Switched from UDP to BJP |
| Ri Bhoi | 10 | Jirang (ST) | Sosthenes Sohyun | National People's Party | MDA | Cabinet Minister |
| Ri Bhoi | 11 | Umsning (ST) | Celestine Lyngdoh | National People's Party | MDA | Switched from INC to NPP |
| Ri Bhoi | 12 | Umroi (ST) | Damanbait Lamare | National People's Party | MDA | |
| East Khasi Hills | 13 | Mawrengkneng (ST) | Heaving Stone Kharpran | Voice of the People Party | Others | |
| East Khasi Hills | 14 | Pynthorumkhrah | Alexander Laloo Hek | Bharatiya Janata Party | MDA | |
| East Khasi Hills | 15 | Mawlai (ST) | Brightstarwell Marbaniang | Voice of the People Party | Others | |
| East Khasi Hills | 16 | East Shillong (ST) | Ampareen Lyngdoh | National People's Party | MDA | |
| East Khasi Hills | 17 | North Shillong (ST) | Adelbert Nongrum | Voice of the People Party | Others | |
| East Khasi Hills | 18 | West Shillong | Paul Lyngdoh | National People's Party | MDA | Switched from UDP to NPP |
| East Khasi Hills | 19 | South Shillong | Sanbor Shullai | Bharatiya Janata Party | MDA | Cabinet Minister |
| East Khasi Hills | 20 | Mylliem (ST) | Ronnie V. Lyngdoh | National People's Party | MDA | Switched from UPA to MDA |
| East Khasi Hills | 21 | Nongthymmai (ST) | Charles Pyngrope | Mamata All India Trinamool Congress | Others | |
| East Khasi Hills | 22 | Nongkrem (ST) | Ardent Miller Basaiawmoit | Voice of the People Party | Others | |
| East Khasi Hills | 23 | Sohiong (ST) | Synshar Lyngdoh Thabah | Bharatiya Janata Party | MDA | Switched from UDP to BJP |
| East Khasi Hills | 24 | Mawphlang (ST) | Matthew Beyondstar Kurbah | Bharatiya Janata Party | MDA | Switched from UDP to BJP |
| East Khasi Hills | 25 | Mawsynram (ST) | Ollan Singh Suin | Bharatiya Janata Party | MDA | Switched from UDP to BJP |
| East Khasi Hills | 26 | Shella (ST) | Balajied Kupar Synrem | Bharatiya Janata Party | MDA | Switched from UDP to BJP |
| East Khasi Hills | 27 | Pynursla (ST) | Prestone Tysong | National People's Party | MDA | Deputy Chief Minister |
| East Khasi Hills | 28 | Sohra (ST) | Gavin Miguel Mylleim | People's Democratic Front | MDA | PDF merged with NPP |
| East Khasi Hills | 28 | Sohra (ST) | Gavin Miguel Mylleim | National People's Party | MDA | PDF merged with NPP |
| East Khasi Hills | 29 | Mawkynrew (ST) | Banteidor Lyngdoh | People's Democratic Front | MDA | PDF merged with NPP |
| East Khasi Hills | 29 | Mawkynrew (ST) | Banteidor Lyngdoh | National People's Party | MDA | PDF merged with NPP |
| Eastern West Khasi Hills | 30 | Mairang (ST) | Metbah Lyngdoh | United Democratic Party | MDA | Cabinet Minister |
| Eastern West Khasi Hills | 31 | Mawthadraishan (ST) | Shakliar Warjri | Hill State People's Democratic Party | MDA | |
| West Khasi Hills | 32 | Nongstoin (ST) | Gabriel Wahlang | National People's Party | MDA | Switched from INC to NPP |
| West Khasi Hills | 33 | Rambrai-Jyrngam (ST) | Remington Gabil Momin | Independent politician | MDA | |
| West Khasi Hills | 34 | Mawshynrut (ST) | Methodius Dkhar | Hill State People's Democratic Party | MDA | Cabinet Minister |
| South West Khasi Hills | 35 | Ranikor (ST) | Pius Marwein | Bharatiya Janata Party | MDA | Switched from UDP to BJP |
| South West Khasi Hills | 36 | Mawkyrwat (ST) | Renikton Lyngdoh Tongkhar | National People's Party | MDA | Switched from UDP to NPP |
| North Garo Hills | 37 | Kharkutta (ST) | Rupert Momin | National People's Party | MDA | |
| North Garo Hills | 38 | Mendipathar (ST) | Marthon J. Sangma | National People's Party | MDA | |
| North Garo Hills | 39 | Resubelpara (ST) | Timothy J. Shira | National People's Party | MDA | Cabinet Minister |
| North Garo Hills | 40 | Bajengdoba (ST) | Pongseng Marak | National People's Party | MDA | |
| East Garo Hills | 41 | Songsak (ST) | Mukul Sangma | Mamata All India Trinamool Congress | Others | Leader of Opposition MATMC |
| East Garo Hills | 42 | Rongjeng (ST) | Jim M. Sangma | National People's Party | MDA | |
| East Garo Hills | 43 | Williamnagar (ST) | Marcuise N. Marak | National People's Party | MDA | Cabinet Minister |
| West Garo Hills | 44 | Raksamgre (ST) | Limison D. Sangma | National People's Party | MDA | |
| West Garo Hills | 45 | Tikrikilla (ST) | Jimmy D. Sangma | National People's Party | MDA | |
| West Garo Hills | 46 | Phulbari | Abu Taher Mondal | National People's Party | MDA | |
| West Garo Hills | 47 | Rajabala | Mizanur Rahman Kazi | Mamata All India Trinamool Congress | Others | |
| West Garo Hills | 48 | Selsella (ST) | Arbinstone B. Marak | National People's Party | MDA | |
| West Garo Hills | 49 | Dadenggre (ST) | Rupa M. Marak | Mamata All India Trinamool Congress | Others | |
| West Garo Hills | 50 | North Tura (ST) | Thomas A. Sangma | National People's Party | MDA | Speaker |
| West Garo Hills | 51 | South Tura (ST) | Conrad Sangma | National People's Party | MDA | Chief Minister |
| West Garo Hills | 52 | Rangsakona (ST) | Subir Marak | National People's Party | MDA | |
| South West Garo Hills | 53 | Ampati (ST) | Miani D Shira | Mamata All India Trinamool Congress | Others | |
| South West Garo Hills | 54 | Mahendraganj (ST) | Sanjay A. Sangma | National People's Party | MDA | |
| South West Garo Hills | 55 | Salmanpara (ST) | Ian Botham K. Sangma | National People's Party | MDA | |
| West Garo Hills | 56 | Gambegre (ST) | Saleng A. Sangma | Indian National Congress | UPA | Elected to 18th Loksabha |
| West Garo Hills | 56 | Gambegre (ST) | Mehtab Chandee Agitok Sangma | National People's Party | MDA | Elected in bypoll |
| West Garo Hills | 57 | Dalu (ST) | Brening A. Sangma | National People's Party | MDA | Cabinet Minister |
| South Garo Hills | 58 | Rongara Siju (ST) | Rakkam A Sangma | National People's Party | MDA | |
| South Garo Hills | 59 | Chokpot (ST) | Sengchim N. Sangma | National People's Party | MDA | |
| South Garo Hills | 60 | Baghmara (ST) | Kartush R. Marak | Independent politician | MDA | |

== List of Leaders of Opposition ==
| Year | Assembly | Portrait | Name | Constituency | Tenure | | Chief Minister | Party |
|---|---|---|---|---|---|---|---|---|
| 1978 | 2nd | | Paty Ripple Kyndiah | Jaiaw | 1979 | 1981 | | |
| 2008 | 8th | | | | | | D. D. Lapang | |
| 2008 | 8th | | | | | | Donkupar Roy | |
| 2008 | 8th | | Conrad Sangma | Selsella | 2009 | 2013 | President's rule | Nationalist Congress Party |
| 2008 | 8th | | Conrad Sangma | Selsella | 2009 | 2013 | D D Lapang | Nationalist Congress Party |
| 2008 | 8th | | Conrad Sangma | Selsella | 2009 | 2013 | Mukul Sangma | Nationalist Congress Party |
| 2013 | 9th | | Donkupar Roy | Shella Assembly | 18 June 2013 | 5 March 2018 | Mukul Sangma | United Democratic Party (Meghalaya) |
| 2018 | 10th | | Mukul Sangma | Songsak | 14 March 2018 | 24 November 2021 | Conrad Sangma | Indian National Congress |
| 2018 | 10th | Vacant | | | 24 November 2021 | 13 January 2022 | Conrad Sangma | N/A |
| 2018 | 10th | | Mukul Sangma | Songsak | 13 January 2022 | 4 March 2023 | Conrad Sangma | All India Trinamool Congress |
| 2023 | 11th | | Ronnie V. Lyngdoh | Mylliem | 09 June 2023 | 28 August 2024 | Conrad Sangma | Indian National Congress |
| 2023 | 11th | | Mukul Sangma | Songsak | 28 August 2024 | Incumbent | Conrad Sangma | All India Trinamool Congress |

== See also ==
- 11th Meghalaya Assembly
