= Shamsul Hoque =

Meghalaya politician

Member of Meghalaya Legislative Assembly
- In office 1972–1978
- Preceded by: Post established
- Succeeded by: Manik Ch. Das
- Constituency: Mahendraganj

Personal details
- Born: Majherchar, Meghalaya
- Party: Independent

Shamsul Hoque (Bengali: শামসুল হক) was an Indian Bengali politician. He was the inaugural holder of the Mahendraganj constituency in the Meghalaya Legislative Assembly.

== Life ==
Hoque was born into a Bengali Muslim family in the village of Majherchar in the Garo Hills of Meghalaya. Despite being an independent candidate, he defeated Khelaram Barman of the Indian National Congress in the state's first ever elections, thus winning the Mahendraganj constituency of South West Garo Hills district. Among Hoque's contributions was the demand for the electrification of Mahendraganj. On 14 July 1974, the Border Security Force committed atrocities in Majherchar and surrounding villages. Hoque attempted to protect his constituents but was kidnapped by the Border Security Force and locked up in a nearby checkpoint. Local police managed to free Hoque the next day.

He also participated in the 1978 and 1983 Meghalaya Legislative Assembly elections but only reached second place in both elections.
