= Sanjay Sangma =

Indian politician (born 1975)

Sanjay A. Sangma (born 1975) is an Indian politician from Meghalaya. He is a member of the Meghalaya Legislative Assembly from the Mahendraganj Assembly constituency, which is reserved for Scheduled Tribe community, in South West Garo Hills district. He won the 2023 Meghalaya Legislative Assembly election representing the National People's Party.

== Early life and education ==
Sangma is from Mahendraganj, South West Garo Hills district, Meghalaya. He is the son of the late Abdul Jalil Khan. He studied Class 8 at Don Bosco Higher Secondary School, Tura, West Garo Hills, Meghalaya and passed the examinations in 1988. His wife is a government employee.

== Career ==
Sangma won the Mahendraganj Assembly constituency representing the National People's Party in the 2023 Meghalaya Legislative Assembly election. He polled 13,560 votes and defeated his nearest rival, Dikkanchi D. Shira of the All India Trinamool Congress, by a margin of 1,718 votes.
