= Ranikor Assembly constituency =

Legislative Assembly constituency in Meghalaya State, India

Coordinates: 25.23°N 91.24°E

Ranikor
- Constituency No. 35 for the Meghalaya Legislative Assembly

Constituency details
- Country: India
- Region: Northeast India
- State: Meghalaya
- District: South West Khasi Hills
- Lok Sabha constituency: Shillong
- Established: 2008
- Total electors: 35,764
- Reservation: ST

Member of Legislative Assembly
- 11th Meghalaya Legislative Assembly
- Incumbent Pius Marwein
- Party: BJP
- Alliance: NDA
- Elected year: 2023

Ranikor is one of the 60 Legislative Assembly constituencies of Meghalaya state in India.

It is part of South West Khasi Hills district and is reserved for candidates belonging to the Scheduled Tribes. The constituency was created after the passing of Delimitation of Parliamentary and Assembly constituencies, 2008. It had its first election in 2013. As of 2023, it is represented by Pius Marwein of the Bharatiya Janata Party party.

== Members of the Legislative Assembly ==
Election	Name	Party
2013	Martin Danggo	Indian National Congress
2018	Martin Danggo	Indian National Congress
2018 By-election	Pius Marwein (Note: Elected as United Democratic Party. Switched to BJP in Sept 2026)	United Democratic Party
2023	Pius Marwein	United Democratic Party

== Election results ==
=== Assembly Election 2023 ===
2023 Meghalaya Legislative Assembly election: Ranikor
Party	Candidate	Votes	%	±%
UDP	Pius Marwein	16,502	50.94%	▲0.98
BJP	Martin Danggo	10,853	33.50%	New
Independent	Mighter Marwein	3,035	9.37%	New
VPP	Overlin Imiong	988	3.05%	New
INC	Victorealness Syiemlieh	494	1.52%	▼2.03
NOTA	None of the Above	128	0.40%	▼0.30
Margin of victory		5,649	17.44%	▲6.46
Turnout		32,395	90.58%	▲1.98
Registered electors		35,764		▲20.09
UDP hold		Swing	▲0.98	

=== Assembly By-election 2018 ===
2018 Meghalaya Legislative Assembly by-election: Ranikor
Party	Candidate	Votes	%	±%
UDP	Pius Marwein	13,183	49.96%	▲16.93
NPP	Martin Danggo	10,287	38.99%	▲26.97
PDF	Pynshngainlang Syiem	1,978	7.50%	▲2.13
INC	Jackiush A. Sangma	938	3.55%	▼36.87
NOTA	None of the Above	184	0.70%	▲0.19
Margin of victory		2,896	10.98%	▲3.59
Turnout		26,386	89.23%	▼2.63
Registered electors		29,781		▲0.29
UDP gain from INC		Swing	▲9.54	

=== Assembly Election 2018 ===
2018 Meghalaya Legislative Assembly election: Ranikor
Party	Candidate	Votes	%	±%
INC	Martin Danggo	10,952	40.43%	▼0.80
UDP	Pius Marwein	8,950	33.04%	▼6.15
NPP	Donkupar Massar	3,256	12.02%	▼1.44
BJP	Pelcy Snaitang	1,907	7.04%	New
PDF	Airmarchal Diengngan	1,453	5.36%	New
Independent	Martha R. Marak	98	0.36%	New
NCP	John Dandaly Sangma	76	0.28%	▼0.33
NOTA	None of the Above	138	0.51%	New
Margin of victory		2,002	7.39%	▲5.35
Turnout		27,091	91.23%	▲0.82
Registered electors		29,696		▲20.45
INC hold		Swing	▼0.80	

=== Assembly Election 2013 ===
2013 Meghalaya Legislative Assembly election: Ranikor
Party	Candidate	Votes	%	±%
INC	Martin Danggo	9,189	41.23%	New
UDP	Probin K. Raswai	8,734	39.19%	New
NPP	Cornileous Nongbri	3,000	13.46%	New
Independent	Pranklip M. Marak	736	3.30%	New
Independent	Ketson Ch. Sangma	255	1.14%	New
HSPDP	Rangsandor Syiem	238	1.07%	New
NCP	Desmond B. Wanshnong	136	0.61%	New
Margin of victory		455	2.04%	
Turnout		22,288	90.40%	
Registered electors		24,654		
INC win (new seat)				

== See also ==
- List of constituencies of the Meghalaya Legislative Assembly
- South West Khasi Hills district
