= Gavin Miguel Mylliem =

Indian politician (born 1992)

Gavin Miguel Mylliem (born 1992) is an Indian politician from Meghalaya. He is a member of the Meghalaya Legislative Assembly from the Sohra Assembly constituency, which is reserved for Scheduled Tribe community, in East Khasi Hills district. He won the 2023 Meghalaya Legislative Assembly election representing the People's Democratic Front (Meghalaya), which later merged to the National People's Party.

== Early life and education ==
Mylliem is from Umthli village, Sohra post, East Khasi Hills district, Meghalaya. He is the son of Winston Mark Simon Pariat. He completed his bachelor's degree in Commerce in 2012 at North Eastern Hill University. Earlier, he did his B.Com. at St. Anthony's College. He also did his Senior School Certificate and passed the examinations conducted by the Central Board of Secondary Education in 2009.

== Career ==
Mylliem first became an MLA winning the 2018 Meghalaya Legislative Assembly election from the Sohra Assembly constituency, representing the People's Democratic Front (Meghalaya). In the 2023 Meghalaya Legislative Assembly election he was re-elected, polling 11,358 votes and defeating his nearest rival, Titosstar Well Chyne of the United Democratic Party, by a margin of 15 votes.
