= Rupert Momin =

Indian politician (born 1974)

Rupert Momin (born 8 March 1974) is an Indian politician from Meghalaya. He is a member of the Meghalaya Legislative Assembly from the Kharkutta Assembly constituency, which is reserved for Scheduled Tribe community, in North Garo Hills district. He won the 2023 Meghalaya Legislative Assembly election representing the National People's Party.

== Early life and education ==
Momin is from Kharkutta village, North Garo Hills district, Meghalaya. He completed his Master of Library and Information Science in 1998 at North Eastern Hill University, Shillong and his LLB at Tura Law College, Tura in 2011. His wife works as an assistant lecturer at Mendipathar College.

== Career ==
Momin won the Kharkutta Assembly constituency representing the National People's Party (India) in the 2023 Meghalaya Legislative Assembly election. He polled 17,426 votes and defeated his nearest rival, Cherak Watre Momin of the All India Trinamool Congress, by a margin of 1,530 votes. He first became an MLA winning the 2018 Meghalaya Legislative Assembly election defeating Cherak Watre Momin of the Indian National Congress, by a margin of 809 votes. Earlier, he contested as an independent candidate in the 2013 Assembly election and finished third behind the winning Congress candidate Cherak Momin, winner, and Omillo K. Sangma of the NPP.
