= Nongthymmai Assembly constituency =

Legislative Assembly constituency in Meghalaya State, India

Coordinates: 25.56°N 91.9°E

Nongthymmai
- Constituency No. 21 for the Meghalaya Legislative Assembly

Constituency details
- Country: India
- Region: Northeast India
- State: Meghalaya
- District: East Khasi Hills
- Lok Sabha constituency: Shillong
- Established: 1972
- Total electors: 36,602
- Reservation: ST

Member of Legislative Assembly
- 11th Meghalaya Legislative Assembly
- Incumbent Charles Pyngrope
- Party: Mamata All India Trinamool Congress
- Elected year: 2023

Nongthymmai is one of the 60 Legislative Assembly constituencies of Meghalaya state in India.

It is part of East Khasi Hills district and is reserved for candidates belonging to the Scheduled Tribes.

== Members of the Legislative Assembly ==
Year	Member	Party
1972	Brington Buhai Lyngdoh	All Party Hill Leaders Conference
2013	Jemino Mawthoh	United Democratic Party
2018	Charles Pyngrope	Indian National Congress
2023	Charles Pyngrope	All India Trinamool Congress

== Election results ==
=== Assembly Election 2023 ===
2023 Meghalaya Legislative Assembly election: Nongthymmai
Party	Candidate	Votes	%	±%
AITC	Charles Pyngrope	7,452	30.22%	New
UDP	Dr. Jemino Mawthoh	6,253	25.36%	▼12.05
VPP	Winston Tony Lyngdoh	4,473	18.14%	New
BJP	David Kharsati	3,274	13.28%	▲0.90
NPP	Jasmine Mary Lyngdoh	2,054	8.33%	▲6.91
INC	Banida Shisha Kharkongor	1,045	4.24%	▼37.04
NOTA	None of the Above	364	1.48%	▲0.33
Margin of victory		1,199	4.86%	▲1.00
Turnout		24,659	67.37%	▼5.71
Registered electors		36,602		▲7.98
AITC gain from INC		Swing	▼11.05	

=== Assembly Election 2018 ===
2018 Meghalaya Legislative Assembly election: Nongthymmai
Party	Candidate	Votes	%	±%
INC	Charles Pyngrope	10,225	41.27%	▲1.79
UDP	Dr. Jemino Mawthoh	9,268	37.41%	▼7.54
BJP	Ernest Mawrie	3,065	12.37%	▲2.74
PDF	Latiplang Kharkongor	655	2.64%	New
NPP	Ehkupar Nongrum	352	1.42%	New
NCP	Ronaldson Dkhar	292	1.18%	New
NOTA	None of the Above	285	1.15%	New
Margin of victory		957	3.86%	▼1.61
Turnout		24,773	73.08%	▼0.26
Registered electors		33,897		▲19.57
INC gain from UDP		Swing	▼3.68	

=== Assembly Election 2013 ===
2013 Meghalaya Legislative Assembly election: Nongthymmai
Party	Candidate	Votes	%	±%
UDP	Jemino Mawthoh	9,347	44.95%	New
INC	Charles Pyngrope	8,210	39.48%	New
BJP	Ehkupar Nongrum	2,002	9.63%	New
HSPDP	Bhabok Blaze Syiem	1,027	4.94%	New
KHNAM	Manosha Warjri	207	1.00%	New
Margin of victory		1,137	5.47%	▲0.60
Turnout		20,793	73.34%	▲24.90
Registered electors		28,350		▲235.82
UDP gain from APHLC		Swing	▲13.93	

=== Assembly Election 1972 ===
1972 Meghalaya Legislative Assembly election: Nongthymmai
Party	Candidate	Votes	%	±%
APHLC	Brington Buhai Lyngdoh	1,269	31.03%	New
Independent	Goilas Marbaniang	1,070	26.16%	New
Independent	Emlyn M. Roy	820	20.05%	New
Independent	Plissibon Marbaniang	514	12.57%	New
Independent	Ekestiemshan Kharkongor	417	10.20%	New
Margin of victory		199	4.87%	
Turnout		4,090	50.40%	
Registered electors		8,442		
APHLC win (new seat)				

== See also ==
- List of constituencies of the Meghalaya Legislative Assembly
- East Khasi Hills district
