= Thomas A. Sangma =

Indian politician

Speaker of the Meghalaya Legislative Assembly
- Incumbent
- Assumed office 9 March 2023
- Chief Minister: Conrad Sangma
- Deputy Speaker: Timothy Shira (until sep 2025); Limison D. Sangma (since sep 2025)
- Preceded by: Metbah Lyngdoh
- Constituency: North Tura

Member of the Meghalaya Legislative Assembly
- Incumbent
- Assumed office 3 March 2018
- Constituency: North Tura

Personal details
- Party: National People's Party (India)

Thomas A. Sangma (born July 27, 1961, in Tura, Meghalaya) is an Indian politician from Meghalaya and member of the National People's Party. He was elected to Upper House of India Parliament the Rajya Sabha for the term of 2008–2014 from Nationalist Congress Party.
