= Jim Sangma =

Indian politician (born 1976)

Jim Sangma (born 30 March 1976) is an Indian politician from Meghalaya. He is a member of the Meghalaya Legislative Assembly from the Rongjeng Assembly constituency, which is reserved for Scheduled Tribe community, in East Garo Hills district. He was first elected in the 2023 Meghalaya Legislative Assembly election, representing the National People's Party (India).

== Early life and education ==
Sangma is from Upper Rongjeng, East Garo Hills District, Meghalaya. He is the son of Paul D Marak. He completed his bachelor's degree in education at B.Ed. College, Tura, which is affiliated with North Eastern Hill University. Earlier, he did his B.A. in 1998 at St. Edmund's College, Shillong, which is also affiliated with North Eastern Hill University. His wife is a teacher at Darusak Bandasal U.P. School.

== Career ==
Sangma won the Rongjeng Assembly constituency representing the National People's Party (India) in the 2023 Meghalaya Legislative Assembly election. He polled 8,836 votes and defeated his nearest rival, Walseng M. Sangma, an independent candidate, by a margin of 128 votes.
