= Rakkam A Sangma =

Indian politician

Rakkam Ampang Sangma

Cabinet Minister, Education Department, Government of Meghalaya
- Incumbent
- Assumed office 7 March 2023
- Governor: Shri. Chandrashekhar H. Vijayshankar
- Cabinet: Second Conrad Sangma ministry
- Chief Minister: Conrad Sangma
- Ministry and Departments: Ministry of Education; Border Areas Development; General Administration Department

Member of the Meghalaya Legislative Assembly
- Incumbent
- Assumed office 2018
- Constituency: Rongara-Siju
- Governor: Phagu Chauhan

Personal details
- Party: National People's Party
- Occupation: Politician, former lecturer

Rakkam Ampang Sangma is an Indian politician who is a Member of the Legislative Assembly from the Indian state of Meghalaya of North East India since 2018 from the Rongara Siju Assembly Constituency. He currently serves as a Cabinet Minister in the State Government of Meghalaya for the departments of Education, Border Areas Development and General Administration in the Government of Meghalaya.

== Early career ==
Rakkam was an assistant lecturer at Baghmara higher secondary school. His father's name is Ringban S Marak, he obtained his M.Sc. degree in physics from North Eastern Hill University.

== Political career ==
Rakkam started his political career as an Independent candidate contesting from the Rongara Siju Assembly constituency in the year of 2013 at the age of 29. In 2014 he joined the National People's Party under the leadership of P. A. Sangma, who was the former Speaker of Loksabha and fourth chief minister of Meghalaya. He contested from the same constituency in the 2018 Meghalaya Legislative Assembly Election and was again elected. Rakkam contested from the same constituency in the 2023 Meghalaya Legislative Assembly Election and won with a huge majority. He became a cabinet minister of 3 departments; namely the Education, Border Areas Development, and General Administration Departments.
