= Cyrtodactylus karsticolus =

Scientific classification
- Kingdom: Animalia
- Phylum: Chordata
- Class: Reptilia
- Order: Squamata
- Suborder: Gekkota
- Family: Gekkonidae
- Genus: Cyrtodactylus
- Species: C. karsticolus

Binomial name
- Cyrtodactylus karsticolus Purkayastha, Lalremsanga, Bohra, Biakzuala, Decemson, Muansanga, Vabeiryureilai, & Rathee, 2021

Species of lizard

Cyrtodactylus karsticolus is a species of gecko endemic to the South Garo Hills of Meghalaya, India, especially the Rongara Siju area.
