= Sosthenes Sohtun =

Indian politician (born 1975)

Sosthenes Sohtun (born 1975) is an Indian politician from Meghalaya. He has served as minister of the Secretariat Administration Department since 16 September 2025. He is a member of the Meghalaya Legislative Assembly from the Jirang Assembly constituency, which is reserved for Scheduled Tribes, in Ri Bhoi district. He was elected in the 2018 and 2023 Meghalaya Legislative Assembly elections, representing the National People's Party.

== Early life and education ==
Sohtun is from Jirang, Ri Bhoi district, Meghalaya. He is the son of the late P. Warjri. He passed the pre-university course in arts at St. Anthony’s College, which is affiliated with North-Eastern Hill University.

== Career ==
Sohtun was elected from the Jirang Assembly constituency representing National People's Party in the 2023 Meghalaya Legislative Assembly election. He polled 12,690 votes and defeated his nearest rival, Adrian Lambert Mylleim of the Indian National Congress, by a margin of 1,623 votes. He first became an MLA winning the 2018 Meghalaya Legislative Assembly election representing the NPP from Jirang, defeating his nearest rival, Witness Day Sancley of the Indian National Congress, by a margin of 220 votes.
