= Amlarem Assembly constituency =

Legislative Assembly constituency in Meghalaya State, India

Coordinates: 25.29°N 92.12°E

Amlarem
- Constituency No. 7 for the Meghalaya Legislative Assembly

Constituency details
- Country: India
- Region: Northeast India
- State: Meghalaya
- District: West Jaintia Hills
- Lok Sabha constituency: Shillong
- Established: 2008
- Total electors: 39,149
- Reservation: ST

Member of Legislative Assembly
- 11th Meghalaya Legislative Assembly
- Incumbent Lahkmen Rymbui
- Party: BJP
- Alliance: NDA
- Elected year: 2023

Amlarem is one of the 60 Legislative Assembly constituencies of Meghalaya, a north east state of India. It is part of West Jaintia Hills district and is reserved for candidates belonging to the Scheduled Tribes. It falls under Shillong Lok Sabha constituency and its MLA is Lahkmen Rymbui of Bharatiya Janata Party.

== Members of the Legislative Assembly ==
Year	Member	Party
2013	Stephanson Mukhim	Independent
2018	Lahkmen Rymbui	United Democratic Party
2023	Lahkmen Rymbui (Note: Elected as United Democratic Party. Switched to BJP in Sept 2026)	United Democratic Party

== Election results ==
=== Assembly Election 2023 ===
2023 Meghalaya Legislative Assembly election: Amlarem
Party	Candidate	Votes	%	±%
UDP	Lahkmen Rymbui	17,803	49.60%	▲0.06
NPP	Stephanson Mukhim	17,746	49.44%	▲8.73
NOTA	None of the Above	328	0.91%	▼0.66
Margin of victory		57	0.16%	▼8.67
Turnout		35,895	91.69%	▼0.55
Registered electors		39,149		▲21.13
UDP hold		Swing	▲0.06	

=== Assembly Election 2018 ===
2018 Meghalaya Legislative Assembly election: Amlarem
Party	Candidate	Votes	%	±%
UDP	Lahkmen Rymbui	14,766	49.53%	▲25.22
NPP	Stephanson Mukhim	12,135	40.71%	New
INC	Holando Lamin	1,238	4.15%	▼24.56
BJP	Riang Lenon Tariang	867	2.91%	New
NOTA	None of the Above	469	1.57%	New
Margin of victory		2,631	8.83%	▲4.28
Turnout		29,810	92.23%	▲1.02
Registered electors		32,320		▲18.15
UDP gain from Independent		Swing	▲16.28	

=== Assembly Election 2013 ===
2013 Meghalaya Legislative Assembly election: Amlarem
Party	Candidate	Votes	%	±%
Independent	Stephanson Mukhim	8,297	33.25%	New
INC	Lahkmen Rymbui	7,163	28.71%	New
UDP	Riang Lenon Tariang	6,067	24.32%	New
Independent	Dunno Nongpluh	3,424	13.72%	New
Margin of victory		1,134	4.54%	
Turnout		24,951	91.22%	
Registered electors		27,354		
Independent win (new seat)				

== See also ==
- West Jaintia Hills district
- Shillong (Lok Sabha constituency)
- List of constituencies of the Meghalaya Legislative Assembly
