= Mahendraganj Assembly constituency =

Legislative Assembly constituency in Meghalaya State, India

Coordinates: 25.3°N 89.85°E

Mahendraganj
- Constituency No. 54 for the Meghalaya Legislative Assembly

Constituency details
- Country: India
- Region: Northeast India
- State: Meghalaya
- District: South West Garo Hills
- Lok Sabha constituency: Tura
- Established: 1972
- Total electors: 36,609
- Reservation: ST

Member of Legislative Assembly
- 11th Meghalaya Legislative Assembly
- Incumbent Sanjay A. Sangma
- Party: NPP
- Alliance: NDA
- Elected year: 2023

Mahendraganj is one of the 60 Legislative Assembly constituencies of Meghalaya state in India.

It is part of South West Garo Hills district and it shares its international border with Bangladesh.

== Members of the Legislative Assembly ==
Year	Member	Party
1972	Shamsul Hoque	Independent politician
1978	Manik Chandra Das	Indian National Congress
1983	Lokhindor Hajong	Indian National Congress
1988	Dhabal Ch. Barman	Hill People's Union
1993	Lokhindor Hajong	Meghalaya Progressive People's Party
1998	Abdus Saleh	Indian National Congress
2003	Nidhu Ram Hajong	Nationalist Congress Party
2008	Abdus Saleh	Indian National Congress
2013	Dikkanchi D. Shira	Indian National Congress
2018	Dikkanchi D. Shira	Indian National Congress
2023	Sanjay A. Sangma	National People's Party

== Election results ==
=== Assembly Election 2023 ===
2023 Meghalaya Legislative Assembly election: Mahendraganj
Party	Candidate	Votes	%	±%
NPP	Sanjay Sangma	13,560	41.47%	▲24.35
AITC	Dikkanchi D. Shira	11,842	36.22%	New
BJP	Tingku N Marak	6,701	20.49%	▼1.20
INC	Sayeedullah Nongrum	331	1.01%	▼48.93
NOTA	None of the Above	173	0.53%	▼0.01
Margin of victory		1,718	5.25%	▼23.00
Turnout		32,697	89.31%	▼2.55
Registered electors		36,609		▲17.53
NPP gain from INC		Swing	▼8.47	

=== Assembly Election 2018 ===
2018 Meghalaya Legislative Assembly election: Mahendraganj
Party	Candidate	Votes	%	±%
INC	Dikkanchi Shira	14,292	49.95%	▼0.21
BJP	Premananda Koch	6,207	21.69%	New
NPP	Sanjay Sangma	4,899	17.12%	▲11.29
UDP	Nidhu Ram Hajong	1,572	5.49%	▼14.96
Independent	Roberth S Sangma	991	3.46%	New
GNC	Mafiara T. Sangma	168	0.59%	New
Independent	Dhabal Ch Barman	127	0.44%	New
NOTA	None of the Above	155	0.54%	New
Margin of victory		8,085	28.25%	▼1.46
Turnout		28,615	91.86%	▲0.96
Registered electors		31,149		▲22.65
INC hold		Swing	▼0.21	

=== Assembly Election 2013 ===
2013 Meghalaya Legislative Assembly election: Mahendraganj
Party	Candidate	Votes	%	±%
INC	Dikkanchi D. Shira	11,580	50.16%	▲6.84
UDP	Nimarson Momin	4,721	20.45%	▲17.82
SP	Nidhu Ram Hajong	4,712	20.41%	New
NPP	Semford B. Sangma	1,346	5.83%	New
Independent	Silme Ch. Marak	298	1.29%	New
NCP	Mafiara T. Sangma	220	0.95%	▼6.46
Independent	Ismail Agitok Sangma	209	0.91%	New
Margin of victory		6,859	29.71%	▲24.32
Turnout		23,086	90.90%	▼0.68
Registered electors		25,397		▲43.58
INC hold		Swing	▲6.84	

=== Assembly Election 2008 ===
2008 Meghalaya Legislative Assembly election: Mahendraganj
Party	Candidate	Votes	%	±%
INC	Abdus Saleh	7,017	43.32%	▲41.96
Independent	Nidhu Ram Hajong	6,143	37.92%	New
NCP	Sahidur Rahman	1,201	7.41%	▼36.66
BJP	Utpal Kumar Koch	846	5.22%	▼6.63
MDP	Dhabal Ch. Barman	449	2.77%	▼1.30
UDP	Piyali Phukan Hajong	426	2.63%	New
CPI	Sriniwas Dubey	117	0.72%	New
Margin of victory		874	5.40%	▼6.16
Turnout		16,199	91.58%	▲8.86
Registered electors		17,689		▼0.47
INC gain from NCP		Swing	▼0.75	

=== Assembly Election 2003 ===
2003 Meghalaya Legislative Assembly election: Mahendraganj
Party	Candidate	Votes	%	±%
NCP	Nidhu Ram Hajong	6,479	44.07%	New
Independent	Abdus Saleh	4,780	32.51%	New
BJP	Ramesh Ch. Barman	1,742	11.85%	▼12.81
Independent	Golam Mostafa	903	6.14%	New
MDP	Dhabal Ch. Barman	598	4.07%	New
INC	Mukul Das	199	1.35%	▼35.58
Margin of victory		1,699	11.56%	▼0.71
Turnout		14,701	82.74%	▼1.52
Registered electors		17,773		▲12.08
NCP gain from INC		Swing	▲7.14	

=== Assembly Election 1998 ===
1998 Meghalaya Legislative Assembly election: Mahendraganj
Party	Candidate	Votes	%	±%
INC	Abdus Saleh	4,933	36.93%	▲15.75
BJP	Mahendra Modak	3,294	24.66%	New
UDP	Nidhu Ram Hajong	2,029	15.19%	New
Independent	Dhabal Ch. Barman	1,219	9.13%	New
Independent	Premananda Koch	755	5.65%	New
Independent	P. Homendra Marak	458	3.43%	New
Independent	Srinivas Dubey	311	2.33%	New
Margin of victory		1,639	12.27%	▲9.84
Turnout		13,357	86.62%	▼3.70
Registered electors		15,857		▲12.29
INC gain from MPPP		Swing	▲13.32	

=== Assembly Election 1993 ===
1993 Meghalaya Legislative Assembly election: Mahendraganj
Party	Candidate	Votes	%	±%
MPPP	Lok Kindor Hajong	2,932	23.61%	New
INC	Dhabal Chandra Barman	2,630	21.18%	▼19.75
Independent	P. Homendra Marak	2,409	19.40%	New
HPU	Golam Medihi	2,282	18.38%	▼36.24
Independent	Abdul Hussain Sarkar	1,984	15.98%	New
CPI	Alaudin Sheikh	106	0.85%	▼2.13
Independent	Giridhari Barman	75	0.60%	New
Margin of victory		302	2.43%	▼11.26
Turnout		12,418	89.21%	▲2.06
Registered electors		14,122		▲19.16
MPPP gain from HPU		Swing	▼31.00	

=== Assembly Election 1988 ===
1988 Meghalaya Legislative Assembly election: Mahendraganj
Party	Candidate	Votes	%	±%
HPU	Dhabal Ch. Barman	5,558	54.61%	New
INC	Harakanta Barman	4,165	40.93%	▲0.57
CPI	Alaudin Sheikh	304	2.99%	New
Independent	Asraf Ali	59	0.58%	New
Independent	Jithen Sangma	16	0.16%	New
Margin of victory		1,393	13.69%	▲5.19
Turnout		10,177	87.45%	▲3.05
Registered electors		11,851		▲21.16
HPU gain from INC		Swing	▲14.26	

=== Assembly Election 1983 ===
1983 Meghalaya Legislative Assembly election: Mahendraganj
Party	Candidate	Votes	%	±%
INC	Lokhindor Hajong	3,269	40.35%	▼25.65
Independent	Shamsul Hoque	2,581	31.86%	New
APHLC	Dhabal Ch. Barman	2,208	27.26%	New
HSPDP	Jithen Sangma	43	0.53%	New
Margin of victory		688	8.49%	▼27.75
Turnout		8,101	84.89%	▲0.09
Registered electors		9,781		▲3.55
INC hold		Swing	▼25.65	

=== Assembly Election 1978 ===
1978 Meghalaya Legislative Assembly election: Mahendraganj
Party	Candidate	Votes	%	±%
INC	Manik Chandra Das	5,158	66.00%	▲34.39
Independent	Shamsul Hoque	2,326	29.76%	New
Independent	Bindo Barman	155	1.98%	New
Independent	Jithen Sangma	95	1.22%	New
Independent	Dr. Romendra Ch. Das	81	1.04%	New
Margin of victory		2,832	36.24%	▲23.50
Turnout		7,815	85.15%	▲17.59
Registered electors		9,446		▲35.62
INC gain from Independent		Swing	▲21.65	

=== Assembly Election 1972 ===
1972 Meghalaya Legislative Assembly election: Mahendraganj
Party	Candidate	Votes	%	±%
Independent	Shamsul Hoque	2,012	44.35%	New
INC	Khelaram Barman	1,434	31.61%	New
Independent	Manik Chandra Das	548	12.08%	New
Independent	Baikuntha Nath Roy	543	11.97%	New
Margin of victory		578	12.74%	
Turnout		4,537	69.72%	
Registered electors		6,965		
Independent win (new seat)				

== See also ==
- List of constituencies of the Meghalaya Legislative Assembly
- West Garo Hills district
