= Hamletson Dohling =

Indian politician

Hamletson Dohling is a People's Democratic Front politician from Meghalaya. He was elected in the 2018 Meghalaya Legislative Assembly election from the Mylliem constituency as candidate of the People's Democratic Front. He was Minister of Municipal Administration, Urban Affairs, Information Technology and Communication in the First Conrad Sangma ministry from 2018 to 2023.
