= Rongara Siju Assembly constituency =

Legislative Assembly constituency in Meghalaya State, India

Coordinates: 25.18°N 90.79°E

Rongara Siju
- Constituency No. 58 for the Meghalaya Legislative Assembly

Constituency details
- Country: India
- Region: Northeast India
- State: Meghalaya
- District: South Garo Hills
- Lok Sabha constituency: Tura
- Established: 2008
- Total electors: 34,468
- Reservation: ST

Member of Legislative Assembly
- 11th Meghalaya Legislative Assembly
- Incumbent Rakkam A Sangma
- Party: NPP
- Alliance: NDA
- Elected year: 2023

Rongara Siju is one of the 60 Legislative Assembly constituencies of Meghalaya state in India. The constituency was created after the passing of the Delimitation of Parliamentary and Assembly constituencies, 2008. It had its first election in 2013. It is part of South Garo Hills district and is reserved for candidates belonging to the Scheduled Tribes.

== Members of the Legislative Assembly ==
Election	Name	Party
2013	Rophul S. Marak	Independent
2018	Rakkam Sangma	National People's Party
2023	Rakkam Sangma	National People's Party

== Election results ==
=== Assembly Election 2023 ===
2023 Meghalaya Legislative Assembly election: Rongara Siju
Party	Candidate	Votes	%	±%
NPP	Rakkam A Sangma	11,569	39.49%	▲7.81
INC	Rophul S Marak	8,311	28.37%	▲4.64
AITC	Dr Rajesh M Marak	7,938	27.10%	▲25.38
BJP	Calis G Momin	1,279	4.37%	New
UDP	Teseng A Sangma	197	0.67%	New
NOTA	None of the Above	137	0.47%	▼1.17
Margin of victory		3,258	11.12%	▲6.79
Turnout		29,294	84.99%	▼1.77
Registered electors		34,468		▲16.86
NPP hold		Swing	▲7.81	

=== Assembly Election 2018 ===
2018 Meghalaya Legislative Assembly election: Rongara Siju
Party	Candidate	Votes	%	±%
NPP	Rakkam A. Sangma	8,108	31.69%	▲17.14
Independent	Rophul S Marak	7,000	27.36%	New
INC	Francis Pondit R. Sangma	6,073	23.73%	▼0.20
GNC	Augustine R. Marak	3,387	13.24%	New
AITC	Rangrick R. Sangma	440	1.72%	New
NOTA	None of the Above	418	1.63%	New
Margin of victory		1,108	4.33%	▲1.06
Turnout		25,589	86.75%	▼1.24
Registered electors		29,496		▲29.37
NPP gain from Independent		Swing	▲4.48	

=== Assembly Election 2013 ===
2013 Meghalaya Legislative Assembly election: Rongara Siju
Party	Candidate	Votes	%	±%
Independent	Rophul S Marak	5,458	27.21%	New
INC	Francis Pondit R. Sangma	4,802	23.94%	New
Independent	Rakkam A. Sangma	3,494	17.42%	New
NPP	Satto R. Marak	2,917	14.54%	New
Independent	Ajithson G. Momin	1,516	7.56%	New
Independent	Albinush R. Marak	1,244	6.20%	New
Independent	Mahamsing M. Sangma	630	3.14%	New
Margin of victory		656	3.27%	
Turnout		20,061	87.99%	
Registered electors		22,799		
Independent win (new seat)				

== Flora and Fauna ==
Cyrtodactylus karsticolus was discovered at the outskirts of the area, on National Highway 217.

== See also ==
- List of constituencies of the Meghalaya Legislative Assembly
- South Garo Hills district
