= Pongseng Marak =

Indian politician (born 1985)

Pongseng Marak (born 1985) is an Indian politician from Meghalaya. He is an MLA from the Bajengdoba Assembly constituency, which is reserved for Scheduled Tribe community, in North Garo Hills district. He was first elected in the 2023 Meghalaya Legislative Assembly election, representing the National People's Party.

== Early life and education ==
Marak is from Bakenang Nalsa, Bajengdoba post, North Garo Hills district, Meghalaya. He is the son of Projendro Momin. He married Arek Marak. He completed his degree in arts in 2007 at Tura Government College, Tura, which is affiliated with North Eastern Hill University.

== Career ==
Marak first became an MLA winning the 2018 Meghalaya Legislative Assembly election. He polled 11,648 votes and defeated the then sitting MLA, Brigady Napak Marak of the Congress, by a margin of 1,964 votes. He won the Bajengdoba Assembly constituency representing the National People's Party in the 2023 Meghalaya Legislative Assembly election. He polled 9,900 votes and defeated his nearest rival, Brigady Napak Marak of the Indian National Congress, by a margin of 2,316 votes.
