= South Tura Assembly constituency =

Legislative Assembly constituency in Meghalaya State, India

Coordinates: 25.5°N 90.21°E

South Tura
- Constituency No. 51 for the Meghalaya Legislative Assembly

Constituency details
- Country: India
- Region: Northeast India
- State: Meghalaya
- District: West Garo Hills
- Lok Sabha constituency: Tura
- Established: 2008
- Total electors: 33,606
- Reservation: ST

Member of Legislative Assembly
- 11th Meghalaya Legislative Assembly
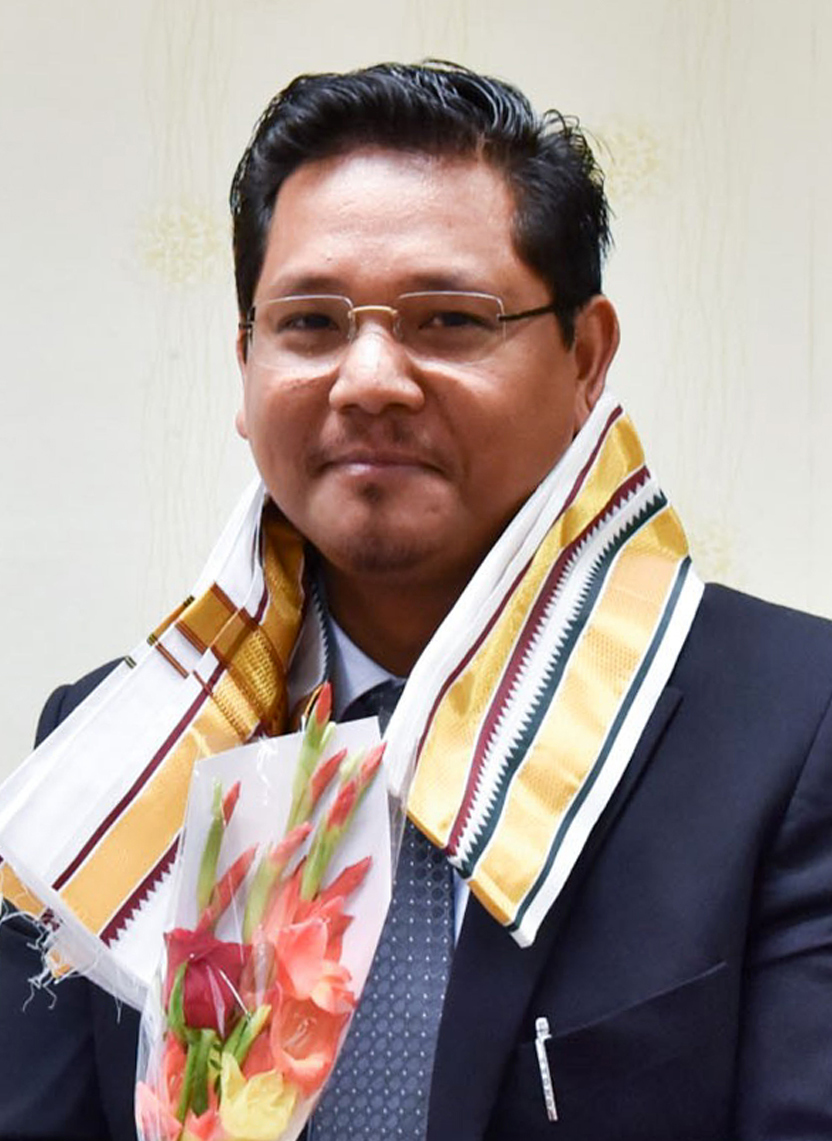
- Incumbent Conrad Sangma; Chief Minister of Meghalaya
- Party: NPP
- Alliance: NDA
- Elected year: 2023
- Preceded by: Agatha Sangma; NPP

South Tura is one of the 60 Legislative Assembly constituencies of Meghalaya state in India. It is part of West Garo Hills district and is reserved for candidates belonging to the Scheduled Tribes. It falls under Tura Lok Sabha constituency and its current MLA is Conrad Sangma of National People's Party. Chief minister of state represents this constituency.

== Members of the Legislative Assembly ==
| Election | Member | Party |
|---|---|---|
| 2013 | John Leslee K. Sangma | Independent politician |
| 2018 | Agatha Sangma | National People's Party |
| 2018 By-election | Conrad Sangma | National People's Party |
| 2023 | Conrad Sangma | National People's Party |

== Election results ==
=== Assembly Election 2023 ===
2023 Meghalaya Legislative Assembly election: South Tura
| Party | Candidate | Votes | % | ±% |
|---|---|---|---|---|
| NPP | Conrad Sangma | 13,342 | 52.68 | ▼9.40 |
| BJP | Bernard N. Marak | 8,326 | 32.87 | New |
| AITC | Richard M Marak | 2,312 | 9.13 | New |
| UDP | John Leslee K. Sangma | 776 | 3.06 | New |
| INC | Brenzield Ch Marak | 572 | 2.26 | ▼21.54 |
| NOTA | None of the Above | 310 | 1.22 | ▲0.23 |
| Margin of victory | | 5,016 | 19.80 | ▼18.47 |
| Turnout | | 25,328 | 75.37 | ▲3.19 |
| Registered electors | | 33,606 | | ▲10.27 |
| NPP hold | | Swing | ▼9.40 | |

=== Assembly By-election 2018 ===
2018 Meghalaya Legislative Assembly by-election: South Tura
| Party | Candidate | Votes | % | ±% |
|---|---|---|---|---|
| NPP | Conrad Sangma | 13,656 | 62.08 | ▲34.27 |
| INC | Charlotte W Momn | 5,235 | 23.80 | ▲8.41 |
| Independent | John Leslee K. Sangma | 2,211 | 10.05 | New |
| Independent | Chriskabul A. Sangma | 897 | 4.08 | New |
| NOTA | None of the Above | 218 | 0.99 | ▲0.26 |
| Margin of victory | | 8,421 | 38.28 | ▲31.42 |
| Turnout | | 21,999 | 72.90 | ▼5.13 |
| Registered electors | | 30,477 | | ▲0.82 |
| NPP hold | | Swing | ▲34.27 | |

=== Assembly Election 2018 ===
2018 Meghalaya Legislative Assembly election: South Tura
| Party | Candidate | Votes | % | ±% |
|---|---|---|---|---|
| NPP | Agatha Sangma | 6,499 | 27.81 | ▲17.76 |
| BJP | Billykid A. Sangma | 4,896 | 20.95 | ▲16.58 |
| INC | Grithalson N. Arengh | 3,597 | 15.39 | ▼20.83 |
| NCP | John Leslee K. Sangma | 3,314 | 14.18 | New |
| Independent | Jingjang M. Marak | 2,028 | 8.68 | New |
| AITC | Bernard N. Marak | 1,560 | 6.67 | New |
| Independent | Brinbal Sangma | 307 | 1.31 | New |
| NOTA | None of the Above | 171 | 0.73 | New |
| Margin of victory | | 1,603 | 6.86 | ▲6.77 |
| Turnout | | 23,372 | 77.32 | ▲0.89 |
| Registered electors | | 30,229 | | ▲17.55 |
| NPP gain from Independent | | Swing | ▼8.51 | |

=== Assembly Election 2013 ===
2013 Meghalaya Legislative Assembly election: South Tura
| Party | Candidate | Votes | % | ±% |
|---|---|---|---|---|
| Independent | John Leslee K. Sangma | 7,137 | 36.31 | New |
| INC | Billykid A. Sangma | 7,119 | 36.22 | New |
| NPP | David Ch Sangma | 1,975 | 10.05 | New |
| Independent | Kunal Ch. Momin | 1,049 | 5.34 | New |
| BJP | David Ch. Marak | 859 | 4.37 | New |
| UDP | Devorsi G. Momin | 730 | 3.71 | New |
| GNC | Jipson R. Marak | 390 | 1.98 | New |
| Margin of victory | | 18 | 0.09 | |
| Turnout | | 19,654 | 76.43 | |
| Registered electors | | 25,715 | | |
| Independent win (new seat) | | | | |

== See also ==
- List of constituencies of the Meghalaya Legislative Assembly
- West Garo Hills district
- Tura, Meghalaya
- Tura (Lok Sabha constituency)
