= Meghalaya Democratic Alliance (2018–present) =

- Abbreviation: MDA
- President: Conrad Sangma (Chief Minister of Meghalaya)
- Founded: 2018
- Ideology: Big tent
- Political position: Centre
- Seats in Rajya Sabha: 1 / 1 (NPP-1) (Meghalaya)
- Seats in Lok Sabha: 0 / 2 (Meghalaya)
- Seats in Meghalaya Legislative Assembly: 50 / 60

Meghalaya Democratic Alliance (MDA) is a state-level alliance in the Meghalaya Legislative Assembly led by National People's Party. The Post-Poll Alliance won majority in 2018 Meghalaya Legislative Assembly election but did not contest unitedly in 2023 Meghalaya Legislative Assembly election as NPP decided to go solo. Other parties also declared to contest alone or in small regional alliance in one or more constituencies. Despite this, the MDA formed government with a majority through post poll alliance.

== Members ==
Party	Symbol	MLAs in Meghalaya Assembly
National People's Party		36
Bharatiya Janata Party		10
Hill State People's Democratic Party		2
Independent		2
