= Martle Mukhim =

Indian politician

Martle N. Mukhim is the chief of the Meghalaya Democratic Party, a political party in the Indian state of Meghalaya. He has formerly represented Dienglieng constituency and is a four-time member of the Meghalaya Legislative Assembly from 1988 to 2008.
