= East Shillong Assembly constituency =

Legislative Assembly constituency in Meghalaya State, India

Coordinates: 25.58°N 91.95°E

East Shillong
- Constituency No. 16 for the Meghalaya Legislative Assembly

Constituency details
- Country: India
- Region: Northeast India
- State: Meghalaya
- District: East Khasi Hills
- Lok Sabha constituency: Shillong
- Established: 2008
- Total electors: 25,504
- Reservation: ST

Member of Legislative Assembly
- 11th Meghalaya Legislative Assembly
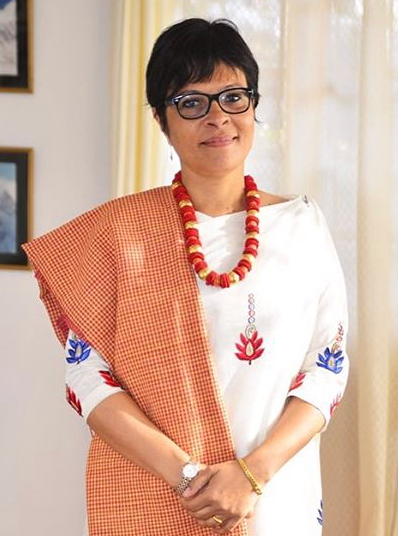
- Incumbent Ampareen Lyngdoh
- Party: NPP
- Alliance: NDA
- Elected year: 2023

East Shillong is one of the 60 Legislative Assembly constituencies of Meghalaya state in India. It is part of East Khasi Hills district and is reserved for candidates belonging to the Scheduled Tribes. It falls under Shillong Lok Sabha constituency and its current MLA is Ampareen Lyngdoh of National People's Party.

== Members of the Legislative Assembly ==
Year	Member	Picture	Party
2013	Ampareen Lyngdoh		Indian National Congress
2018	Ampareen Lyngdoh		Indian National Congress
2023	Ampareen Lyngdoh		National People's Party

== Election results ==
=== Assembly Election 2023 ===
2023 Meghalaya Legislative Assembly election: East Shillong
Party	Candidate	Votes	%	±%
NPP	Dr. Mazel Ampareen Lyngdoh	6,637	39.56%	New
INC	Manuel Badwar	4,926	29.36%	▼29.28
BJP	Wankitbok Pohshna	2,643	15.75%	▼8.53
VPP	Avner Medon Pariat	1,974	11.77%	New
AITC	Ajoy Nongrum	264	1.57%	New
Independent	Wanpynhun Kharsyntiew	243	1.45%	New
NOTA	None of the Above	259	1.54%	▼0.16
Margin of victory		1,711	10.20%	▼24.16
Turnout		16,777	65.78%	▼7.18
Registered electors		25,504		▲5.26
NPP gain from INC		Swing	▼19.09	

=== Assembly Election 2018 ===
2018 Meghalaya Legislative Assembly election: East Shillong
Party	Candidate	Votes	%	±%
INC	Dr. Mazel Ampareen Lyngdoh	10,368	58.65%	▼4.29
BJP	Neil Antonio War	4,294	24.29%	▲18.50
UDP	B. M. Lanong	2,009	11.36%	▼19.90
Independent	Romeo Phira Rani	221	1.25%	New
NOTA	None of the Above	302	1.71%	New
Margin of victory		6,074	34.36%	▲2.69
Turnout		17,679	72.97%	▼1.71
Registered electors		24,229		▲12.72
INC hold		Swing	▼4.29	

=== Assembly Election 2013 ===
2013 Meghalaya Legislative Assembly election: East Shillong
Party	Candidate	Votes	%	±%
INC	Dr. Mazel Ampareen Lyngdoh	10,103	62.94%	New
UDP	B. M. Lanong	5,019	31.27%	New
BJP	Romeo Phira Rani	930	5.79%	New
Margin of victory		5,084	31.67%	
Turnout		16,052	74.68%	
Registered electors		21,495		
INC win (new seat)				

== See also ==
- List of constituencies of the Meghalaya Legislative Assembly
- Shillong (Lok Sabha constituency)
- East Khasi Hills district
