= Wailadmiki Shylla =

Indian politician

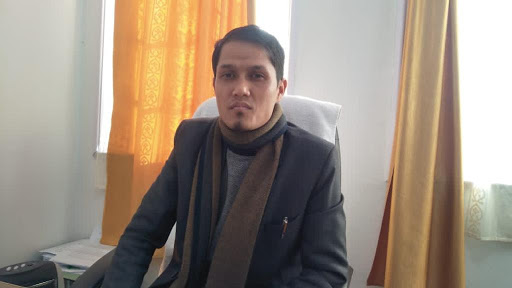

Member of Meghalaya Legislative Assembly
- Incumbent
- Assumed office 2018
- Preceded by: Roytre Christopher Laloo
- Constituency: Jowai

Personal details
- Born: 27 November 1991 (age 34)
- Party: NPP
- Occupation: Politician

Wailadmiki Shylla is the cabinet minister of Health and Family Welfare, who is a member of the Meghalaya Legislative Assembly (MLA) from Jowai constituency. He was first elected in 2018, defeating UDP candidate Moonlight Pariat.

Shylla is the brother-in-law of the Meghalaya deputy chief minister Sniawbhalang Dhar.
