= Metbah Lyngdoh =

Indian politician

Speaker of the Meghalaya Legislative Assembly
- In office September 4, 2019 – 5 March 2023
- Preceded by: Donkupar Roy
- Succeeded by: Thomas A. Sangma

Member of the Meghalaya Legislative Assembly
- Incumbent
- Assumed office 2023
- Constituency: Mairang
- In office 2008–2013
- In office 2013–2018
- In office 2018–2023

Minister of Power Department, Textiles Department, Water Resources Department, and Taxation Department (Government of Meghalaya)
- In office 2025–2026

Personal details
- Party: UDP
- Profession: Politician

Metbah Lyngdoh is a United Democratic Party politician from Meghalaya, India. He was elected to the Meghalaya Legislative Assembly elections in 2008, 2013 and 2018 from the Mairang constituency as a candidate of the United Democratic Party. Lyngdoh, for the fourth time consecutively, was elected to the 11th Meghalaya Legislative Assembly in 2023. He served as speaker of the Meghalaya Legislative Assembly. He has also served as United Democratic Party president after the death of Donkupar Roy. He was Minister of Excise Registration Taxation Stamps, Home (Civil Defence and Home Guards), Tourism, and Water Resources in Conrad Sangma ministry from 2018 to 2019. He is also the current minister for the Power Department, Textiles Department, Water Resources Department, and Taxation Department under the MDA 2.0.
