= North Tura Assembly constituency =

Legislative Assembly constituency in Meghalaya State, India

Coordinates: 25.53°N 90.22°E

North Tura
- Constituency No. 50 for the Meghalaya Legislative Assembly

Constituency details
- Country: India
- Region: Northeast India
- State: Meghalaya
- District: West Garo Hills
- Lok Sabha constituency: Tura
- Established: 2008
- Total electors: 34,434
- Reservation: ST

Member of Legislative Assembly
- 11th Meghalaya Legislative Assembly
- Incumbent Thomas A. Sangma
- Party: National People's Party (India)
- Elected year: 2023

North Tura is one of the 60 Legislative Assembly constituencies of Meghalaya state in India. It is part of West Garo Hills district and is reserved for candidates belonging to the Scheduled Tribes. It falls under Tura Lok Sabha constituency and its current MLA is Thomas A. Sangma of National People's Party.

== Members of the Legislative Assembly ==
Election	Name	Party
2013	Noverfield Marak	Indian National Congress
2018	Thomas A. Sangma	National People's Party
2023	Thomas A. Sangma	National People's Party

== Election results ==
=== Assembly Election 2023 ===
2023 Meghalaya Legislative Assembly election: North Tura
Party	Candidate	Votes	%	±%
NPP	Thomas A. Sangma	11,386	42.75%	▲15.79
BJP	Adam Kid M. Sangma	7,501	28.17%	New
AITC	Rupert M. Sangma	4,743	17.81%	New
INC	Billykid A. Sangma	2,113	7.93%	▼10.31
UDP	Dr. Pilne A. Sangma	665	2.50%	▼2.81
JD(U)	Bina Rosaline A. Sangma	224	0.84%	New
NOTA	None of the Above	262	0.98%	▲0.04
Margin of victory		3,885	14.59%	▲5.88
Turnout		26,632	77.34%	▼1.40
Registered electors		34,434		▲12.68
NPP hold		Swing	▲15.79	

=== Assembly Election 2018 ===
2018 Meghalaya Legislative Assembly election: North Tura
Party	Candidate	Votes	%	±%
NPP	Thomas A. Sangma	6,487	26.96%	▲8.43
INC	Noverfield R. Marak	4,391	18.25%	▼4.64
Independent	Adam Kid M. Sangma	3,886	16.15%	New
Independent	Rupert M. Sangma	2,874	11.94%	New
Independent	Roger Benny A. Sangma	1,953	8.12%	New
Independent	Sengman R. Marak	1,376	5.72%	New
UDP	Utpal Arengh	1,277	5.31%	New
NOTA	None of the Above	226	0.94%	New
Margin of victory		2,096	8.71%	▲5.97
Turnout		24,063	78.75%	▼1.31
Registered electors		30,558		▲18.78
NPP gain from INC		Swing	▲4.08	

=== Assembly Election 2013 ===
2013 Meghalaya Legislative Assembly election: North Tura
Party	Candidate	Votes	%	±%
INC	Noverfield R. Marak	4,713	22.88%	New
Independent	Roger Benny A. Sangma	4,148	20.14%	New
NPP	Thomas A. Sangma	3,817	18.53%	New
Independent	Adam Kid M. Sangma	3,125	15.17%	New
Independent	Kredithson Ch. Marak	1,375	6.68%	New
Independent	Kismet A. Sangma	1,161	5.64%	New
Independent	Sengman R. Marak	869	4.22%	New
Margin of victory		565	2.74%	
Turnout		20,596	80.06%	
Registered electors		25,726		
INC win (new seat)				

== See also ==
- List of constituencies of the Meghalaya Legislative Assembly
- West Garo Hills district
- Tura, Meghalaya
- Tura (Lok Sabha constituency)
