= Brening Sangma =

Indian politician

Brening Sangma is an Indian politician and member of the National People's Party. Sangma was first elected as a member of the Meghalaya Legislative Assembly from the Kherapara constituency in West Garo Hills district as Indian National Congress candidate in 1993 and 1998. He was elected again in the 2018 Meghalaya Legislative Assembly election.
