= Miani D Shira =

Indian politician

MLA
- Constituency: Ampati

Personal details
- Party: All India Trinamool Congress
- Spouse: Daryll William Ch. Momin
- Parent: Mukul Sangma (Father) Dikkanchi D Shira (Mother)

Miani D Shira is an Indian politician from Meghalaya and a member of the All India Trinamool Congress. She was elected as a member of the Legislative Assembly of Meghalaya from Ampati in a 2018 by-election. Miani D Shira is the daughter of former Chief Minister of Meghalaya Mukul Sangma.

After completing her schooling from Shillong, she attended Sri Ram College of Commerce in New Delhi. In 2018, she contested a by-election in the Meghalaya Legislative Assembly for Ampati and defeated the National People's Party candidate C. G. Momin. She is one of the youngest legislators in the Meghalaya Legislative Assembly. Her husband, Daryll William Cheran Momin is also a politician who has contested elections and is the grandson of Williamson A. Sangma.
