= Charles Pyngrope =

Indian politician

Member of the Meghalaya Legislative Assembly
- Incumbent
- Assumed office May 2018
- Preceded by: Jemino Mawthoh
- Constituency: Nongthymmai

State President of Meghalaya Trinamool Congress
- Incumbent
- Assumed office December 2020

Personal details
- Born: 9 September 1960 (age 66) Shillong, Meghalaya, India
- Party: All India Trinamool Congress (2021-present) (until 2026); Mamata All India Trinamool Congress (from 2026)
- Other political affiliations: Indian National Congress (until 2021)
- Children: 1

Charles Pyngrope is an Indian politician from the state of Meghalaya who serves as the State President of the All India Trinamool Congress, Meghalaya. He was the Speaker of the Meghalaya Legislative Assembly from 2009 to 2013 under the United Democratic Party. He was also a prominent Minister in the government of Meghalaya and presently serves in the capacity of Chairman of the Meghalaya Forest Development Corporation. Aside from his current governmental responsibilities, Charles Pyngrope is also involved significantly in community development, environmental sustainability initiatives, and several charitable initiatives to further the cause of education, all of which are executed under the enterprise he chairs, Windermere Holdings.

He is currently representing Nongthymmai in the Meghalaya Legislative Assembly.
