= Lahkmen Rymbui =

Indian politician

Lahkmen ia kpujem Rymbui dawki is a United Democratic Party politician from Meghalaya and a member of the Bharatiya Janata Party. He was elected to the Meghalaya Legislative Assembly in 2008 from the War-Jaintia Assembly constituency as a candidate of the Congress Party and in 2018 from the Amlarem constituency as a candidate of the United Democratic Party (UDP). He was the Minister of Border Areas Development, Education, Forests & Environment in the Conrad Sangma ministry from 2018 and also Home (Police) from 11 February 2020. He served as Minister in charge of Home (Police), Border Areas Department, Education, District Council Affairs in the government of Meghalaya from 2020 to March 2023.

He was elected again in the 2023 Assembly Election on the UDP ticket from the Amlarem Constituency. He held the post of Chief Adviser to the Government of Meghalaya until 15th September 2025.

He was again inducted as Minister in the government of Meghalaya under the Chief Ministership of Conrad K Sangma on 16th September 2025, allotted the portfolio of Education, Revenue and Disaster Management, Information and Public Relation & Law Department.

In September 2026, Rymbui spearheaded a move alongside a group of eight UDP MLAs to merge into the Bharatiya Janata Party legislature party after high-profile meetings with Union Home Minister Amit Shah and Assam Chief Minister Himanta Biswa Sarma in New Delhi.
