= Banteidor Lyngdoh =

Indian politician

Banteidor Lyngdoh is a National People's Party politician from Meghalaya. He was elected in the 2018 Meghalaya Legislative Assembly election from the Mawkynrew constituency as a candidate of the People's Democratic Front. He served as Minister of Horticulture, Agriculture, Sericulture & Weaving, Sports & Youth Affairs in the First Conrad Sangma ministry from 2018 to 2023.

== See also ==
- Langsning SC
