= Martin Danggo =

Indian politician

Martin M. Danggo is an Indian politician from the state of Meghalaya who served as the Minister of Public Works Department (Roads) in the Government of Meghalaya, and represented the 35th Ranikor Scheduled Tribe (ST) constituency in the South West Khasi Hills district in the Meghalaya Legislative Assembly. Danggo was first elected to the Assembly as a representative of the People's Democratic Movement (PDM) in the 1998 Assembly election for the Langrin (ST) constituency. He switched parties to the Indian National Congress and was re-elected in 2003. In 2018 he resigned from the INC and joined the National People's Party.
