= Sniawbhalang Dhar =

Indian politician

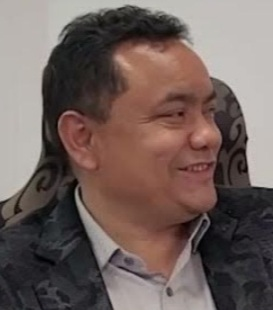

Deputy Chief Minister of Meghalaya
- Incumbent
- Assumed office 7 March 2023 Serving with Prestone Tynsong
- Governor: C. H. Vijayashankar (current)
- Preceded by: Bindo Lalong

Minister of Commerce and Industries, Community and Rural Development, Soil and Water conservation and Transport, Government of Meghalaya
- In office 6 March 2018 – 7 March 2023

Member of the Meghalaya Legislative Assembly for Nartiang
- Incumbent
- Assumed office 2013

Personal details
- Born: 28 December 1981 (age 44)
- Party: National People's Party (since 2017)
- Other political affiliations: Indian National Congress (before 2017)

Sniawbhalang Dhar is an Indian politician of the National People's Party from Meghalaya who has been serving as the Deputy Chief Minister of Meghalaya since 2023 under the NPP's Conrad Sangma alongside Prestone Tynsong. He has been elected to the Meghalaya Legislative Assembly from the Nartiang constituency since 2013. He was also Minister of Commerce & Industries, Community & Rural Development, Soil & Water Conservation, Transport in the First Conrad Sangma ministry from 2018 to 2023.
