= Timothy Shira =

Indian politician

Deputy Speaker of the Meghalaya Legislative Assembly
- In office 2018–2025
- Preceded by: Salseng C. Marak
- Succeeded by: Limison D. Sangma
- Constituency: Resubelpara
- In office 2003–2013
- Preceded by: Salseng C. Marak
- Succeeded by: Salseng C. Marak

Personal details
- Party: National People's Party

Timothy Shira is an Indian politician from Meghalaya. He is a member of the National People's Party. He has served as Minister of Fisheries in Meghalaya since 16 Sep 2025.

In 2003, he was first elected from North Garo Hills district's Resubelpara assembly constituency of Meghalaya. He was elected as the Pro tempore Speaker for the assembly in March 2023.
