= South West Garo Hills district =

Southwest Garo Hills district
- District of Meghalaya
- Location in Meghalaya
- Southwest Garo Hills district
- Country: India
- State: Meghalaya
- Headquarters: Ampati

Government
  - Vidhan Sabha constituencies: 3

Area
  - Total: 822 km^{2} (317 sq mi)

Population (2011)
  - Total: 172,795
  - Density: 210/km^{2} (544/sq mi)

Demographics
  - Literacy: 56.7%
- Time zone: UTC+05:30 (IST)
- Website: southwestgarohills.gov.in

Southwest Garo Hills district is an administrative district in the State of Meghalaya, India. The Ampati Civil Sub-Division is upgraded to a full-fledged district as South West Garo Hills, on 7 August 2012 with its headquarters at Ampati. It was inaugurated by Dr. Mukul Sangma, Hon'ble Chief Minister of Meghalaya, India.

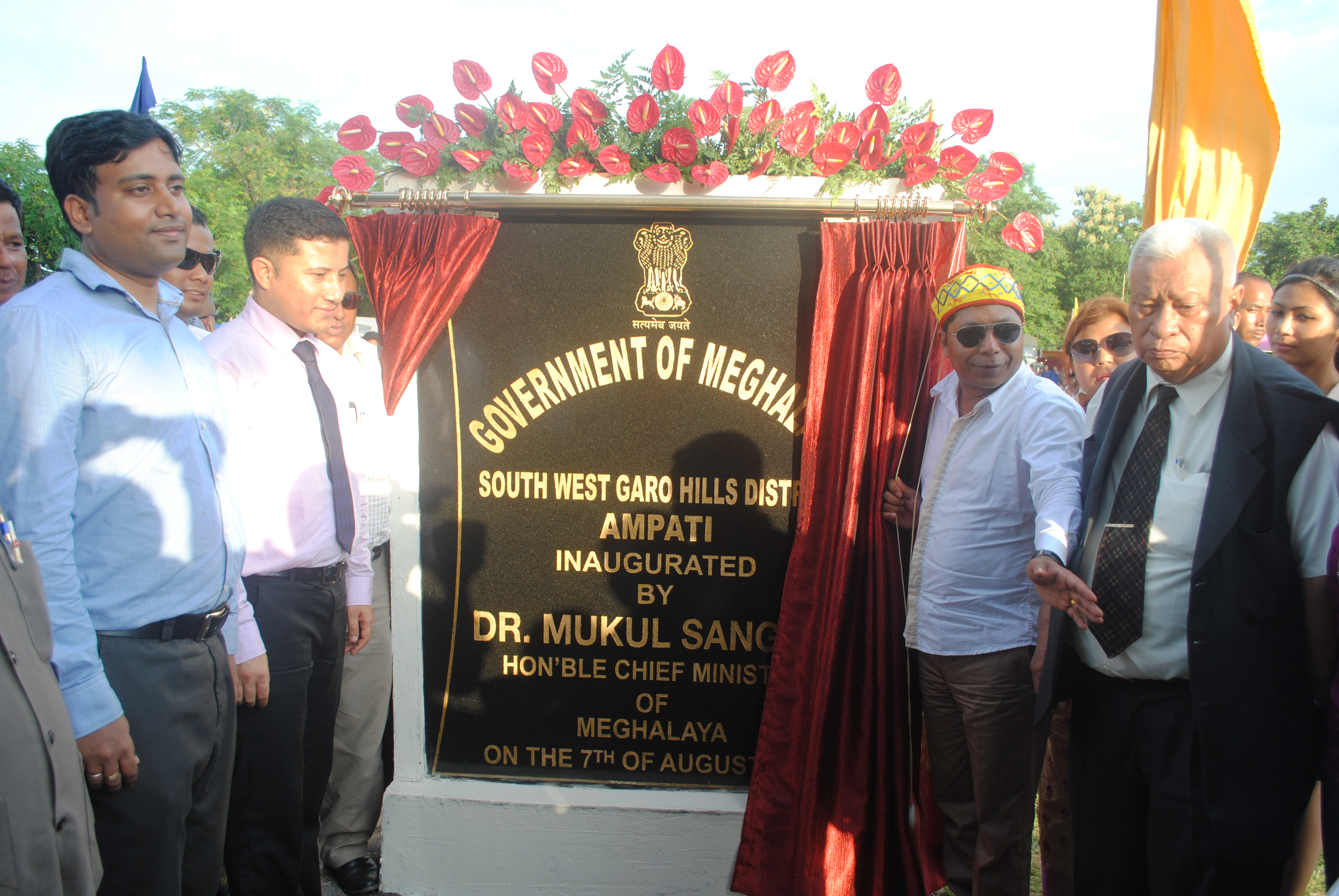
Inauguration of South West Garo Hills District by Chief Minister of Meghalaya, Dr. Mukul Sangma on 7 August 2012

== History and Creation ==
The South West Garo Hills is carved out of present West Garo Hills, Meghalaya, India. The District comprises all the villages falling under the two Community and Rural Development Blocks, viz. Betasing and Zikzak Community and Rural Development Blocks, including 33 (thirty-three) villages under Mukdangra Gram Sevak (GS) Circle and Garobadha Gram Sevak Circle of Selsella Community & Rural Development Block, 24 (twenty-four) villages under Okkapara Songma Gram Sevak Circle and Chengkuregre Gram Sevak Circle of Gambeggre Community & Rural Development Block, 13 (thirteen) villages under Jarangkona Gram Sevak Circle of Dalu Community & Rural Development Block and Anggalgre village of Rongkhongre Gram Sevak Circle of Rongram Community & Rural Development Block.

=== Reorganized Gram Sevak Circle ===
After the reorganization of the Gram Sevak Circle all the villages annexed from other Community and Rural Development Blocks falls under Betasing Community and Rural Development Block, except for Jarangkona Gram Sevak Circle of Dalu Community & Rural Development Block which falls under Zikzak Community and Rural Development Block.

== Demographics ==
The population of South West Garo Hills is 1,72,495 with 87,135 male and 85,360 female population as per Census 2011, which is as per the new reorganized Gram Sevak Circle of Betasing and Zikzak Community and Rural Development Blocks. The literacy rate of the District is 56.7% as per 2011 Census. Scheduled Castes and Scheduled Tribes make up 2,095 (1.21%) and 1,38,168 (80.10%) of the population. Christianity is the dominant religion, with Hinduism and Islam second-largest religions.

=== Language ===
Garo is spoken by majority of the residents of the district. Bengali, Hajong and Koch are the major minority languages.

Languages spoken in South West Garo Hills (2011)
1. Garo (51.1%)
2. Bengali (26.4%)
3. Hajong (5.97%)
4. others (16.5%)

Garo language is spoken by 88,216 people, Bengali language by 45,586, followed by 10,292 speaking Hajong language.

== Notable people ==
- Shamsul Hoque, inaugural MLA of Mahendraganj
