= North-Eastern Hill University =

Central university in Shillong, Meghalaya, India

- Motto: Rise Up and Build
- Type: Public central university
- Established: July 19, 1973; 53 years ago
- Chancellor: Justice L. Narasimha Reddy (Retd.)
- Vice-Chancellor: Saroj Kanta Barik (acting)
- Rector: Governor of Meghalaya
- Visitor: President of India
- Location: Shillong, Meghalaya, 793022, India; 25°36′36″N 91°54′5″E
- Campus: Suburban
- Nickname: NEHU
- Website: www.nehu.ac.in

North-Eastern Hill University (NEHU) is a central university located in Shillong, Meghalaya, India. It was established on 19 July 1973 under the North-Eastern Hill University Act, 1973 (Act No. 24 of 1973), which received presidential assent on 26 May 1973. The university was originally established to serve the hill areas of northeastern India, with jurisdiction over Meghalaya, Nagaland, Arunachal Pradesh and Mizoram.

The university has two campuses; the main campus at Mawkynroh-Umshing in Shillong and a second campus at Chasingre in Tura. The President of India serves as the university's visitor, with the Governor of Meghalaya serving as chief rector.

NEHU's original jurisdiction contracted as neighbouring states established their own institutions. Nagaland University was created on 6 September 1994, at which point NEHU's jurisdiction over Nagaland ceased. Mizoram University followed in June 2001 under the Mizoram University Act, 2000, ending NEHU's jurisdiction over Mizoram as well.
