= People's Democratic Front (Meghalaya) =

Political party in India

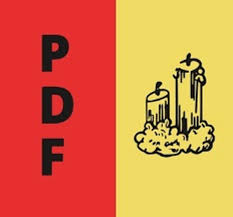
- Abbreviation: PDF
- President: Ivanlum Marbaniang
- Founded: 2017
- Dissolved: 2023
- Merged into: NPP

Election symbol
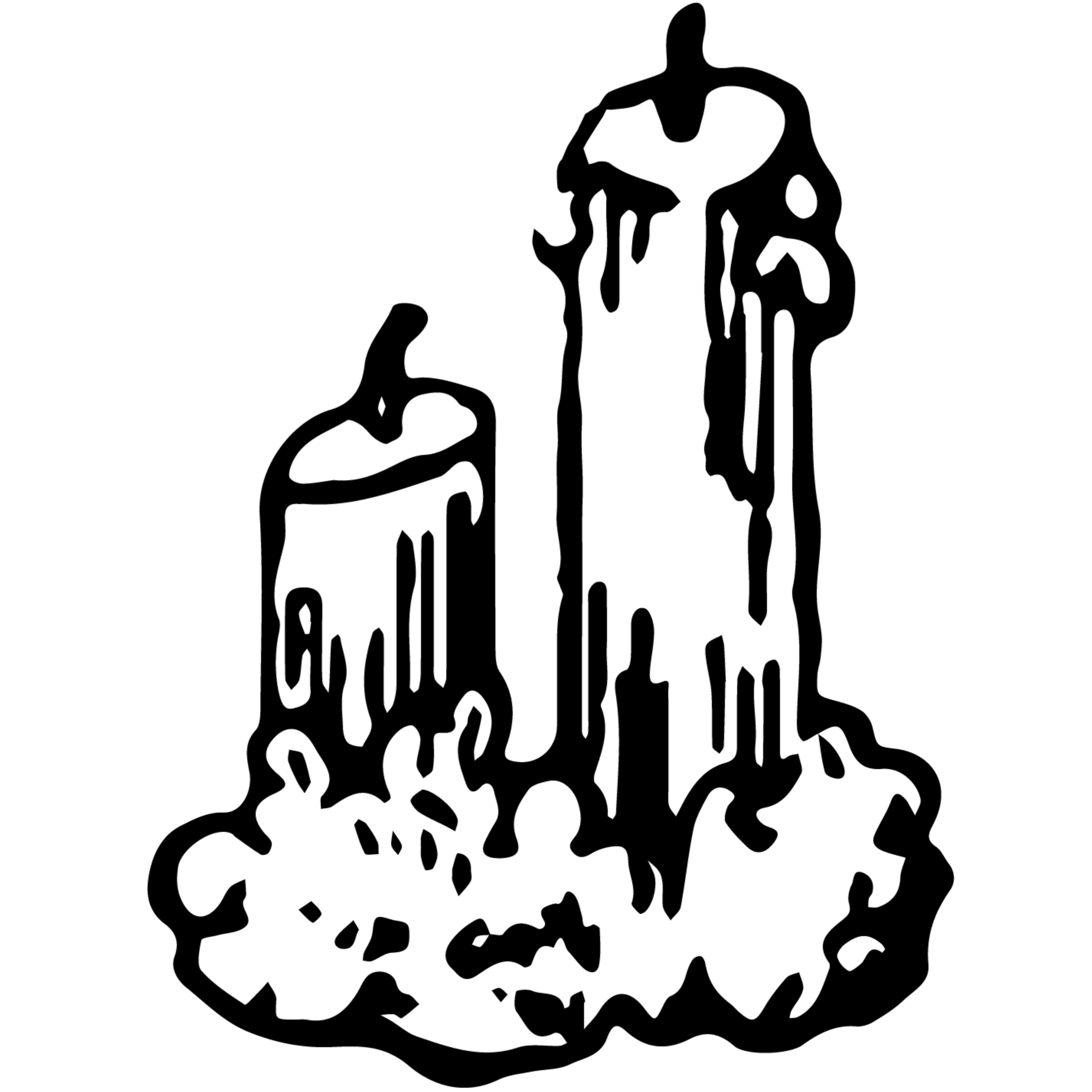

The People's Democratic Front (PDF) was a regional political party in the Indian state of Meghalaya. The PDF was founded in 2017 and was led by P. N. Syiem and Auspicious L. Mawphlang.

It was a part of the North-East Democratic Alliance. The PDF's aim was to improve the development of the state, especially of the tribal people.

In the 2018 Meghalaya Legislative Assembly election, the PDF won 128,413 votes (8.2% of the vote) and elected 4 MLAs.

On 6 May 2023, the party merged with the National People's Party.
