= Elections in Meghalaya =

Elections in Meghalaya are conducted since 1972 to elect the members for Meghalaya Legislative Assembly and Lok Sabha. There are 60 assembly constituencies and 2 Lok Sabha constituencies.

== Vidhan Sabha elections ==
Year	Party-wise Details	Chief Minister	CM Party
1972	AHL - 32, INC - 09, IND - 19	Williamson A. Sangma	AHL
1978	INC - 20, AHL- 16, HSPDP-14, IND - 10	Darwin Diengdoh Pugh	INC
1978	INC - 20, AHL- 16, HSPDP-14, IND - 10	B. B. Lyngdoh	AHL
1978	INC - 20, AHL- 16, HSPDP-14, IND - 10	Williamson A. Sangma	AHL
1983	INC - 25, AHL - 15. HSPDP- 15, PDIC - 02, IND - 02	B. B. Lyngdoh	AHL
1983	INC - 25, AHL - 15. HSPDP- 15, PDIC - 02, IND - 02	Williamson A. Sangma	INC
1988	INC - 22, HPU - 19, HSPDP - 06, AHL - 02, PDIC - 02	P. A. Sangma	INC
1988	INC - 22, HPU - 19, HSPDP - 06, AHL - 02, PDIC - 02	B. B. Lyngdoh	HPU
1988	INC - 22, HPU - 19, HSPDP - 06, AHL - 02, PDIC - 02	D. D. Lapang	INC
1993	INC - 24, HPU - 11, HSPDP - 8, AHL - 3, PDIC - 2, IND - 10	S. C. Marak	INC
1998	INC - 25, UDP - 20, PDM - 3, HSPDP - 3, BJP - 3, GNC - 1, IND - 5	S. C. Marak	INC
1998	INC - 25, UDP - 20, PDM - 3, HSPDP - 3, BJP - 3, GNC - 1, IND - 5	B. B. Lyngdoh	UDP
1998	INC - 25, UDP - 20, PDM - 3, HSPDP - 3, BJP - 3, GNC - 1, IND - 5	E. K. Mawlong	UDP
1998	INC - 25, UDP - 20, PDM - 3, HSPDP - 3, BJP - 3, GNC - 1, IND - 5	Flinder Anderson Khonglam	Independent
2003	INC- 22, NCP - 14, UDP - 9, MDP - 4, HSPDP - 2, BJP - 2, KHNAM - 1, IND - 5	D. D. Lapang	INC
2003	INC- 22, NCP - 14, UDP - 9, MDP - 4, HSPDP - 2, BJP - 2, KHNAM - 1, IND - 5	J. D. Rymbai	INC
2003	INC- 22, NCP - 14, UDP - 9, MDP - 4, HSPDP - 2, BJP - 2, KHNAM - 1, IND - 5	D. D. Lapang	INC
2008	INC- 25, NCP - 14, UDP - 11, HSPDP - 2, BJP - 1, KHNAM - 1, IND - 5	D. D. Lapang	INC
2008	INC- 25, NCP - 14, UDP - 11, HSPDP - 2, BJP - 1, KHNAM - 1, IND - 5	Donkupar Roy	UDP
2008	INC- 25, NCP - 14, UDP - 11, HSPDP - 2, BJP - 1, KHNAM - 1, IND - 5	D. D. Lapang	INC
2008	INC- 25, NCP - 14, UDP - 11, HSPDP - 2, BJP - 1, KHNAM - 1, IND - 5	Mukul Sangma	INC
2013	INC - 29, UDP - 8, HSPDP - 4, NPP - 2, NCP - 2, NESDP - 1, GNC - 1, IND - 13	Mukul Sangma	INC
2018	INC - 21, NPP - 20, UDP - 6, PDF - 4, HSPDP - 2, BJP - 2, KHNAM - 1, NCP - 1, IND - 3	Conrad Sangma	NPP
2023	NPP - 26, UDP - 11, AITC - 5, INC - 5, VPP - 4, HSPDP - 2, BJP - 2, PDF - 2, IND - 2	Conrad Sangma	NPP

== Lok Sabha elections ==
The elections held in Meghalaya for Lok Sabha are listed below.

Year	Lok Sabha Election	Shillong	Tura
1957	Second Lok Sabha	Independent	did not exist
1962	Third Lok Sabha	Independent	did not exist
1967	Fourth Lok Sabha	Independent	did not exist
1971	Fifth Lok Sabha	Independent	AHL
1977	Sixth Lok Sabha	HSPDP	INC
1980	Seventh Lok Sabha	AHL	INC
1984	Eighth Lok Sabha	Independent	INC
1989	Eighth Lok Sabha	INC	INC
1991	Tenth Lok Sabha	INC	INC
1996	Eleventh Lok Sabha	Independent	INC
1998	Twelfth Lok Sabha	INC	INC
1999	Thirteenth Lok Sabha	INC	NCP
2004	Fourteenth Lok Sabha	INC	AITC
2009	Fifteenth Lok Sabha	INC	NCP
2014	Sixteenth Lok Sabha	INC	NPP
2019	Seventeenth Lok Sabha	INC	NPP
2024	Eighteenth Lok Sabha	VPP	INC
