= List of leaders of the opposition in the Meghalaya Legislative Assembly =

Important member in unicameral legislature of Meghalaya

Leader of the Opposition in the Meghalaya Legislative Assembly
- Seal of the state of Meghalaya

- Flag of India

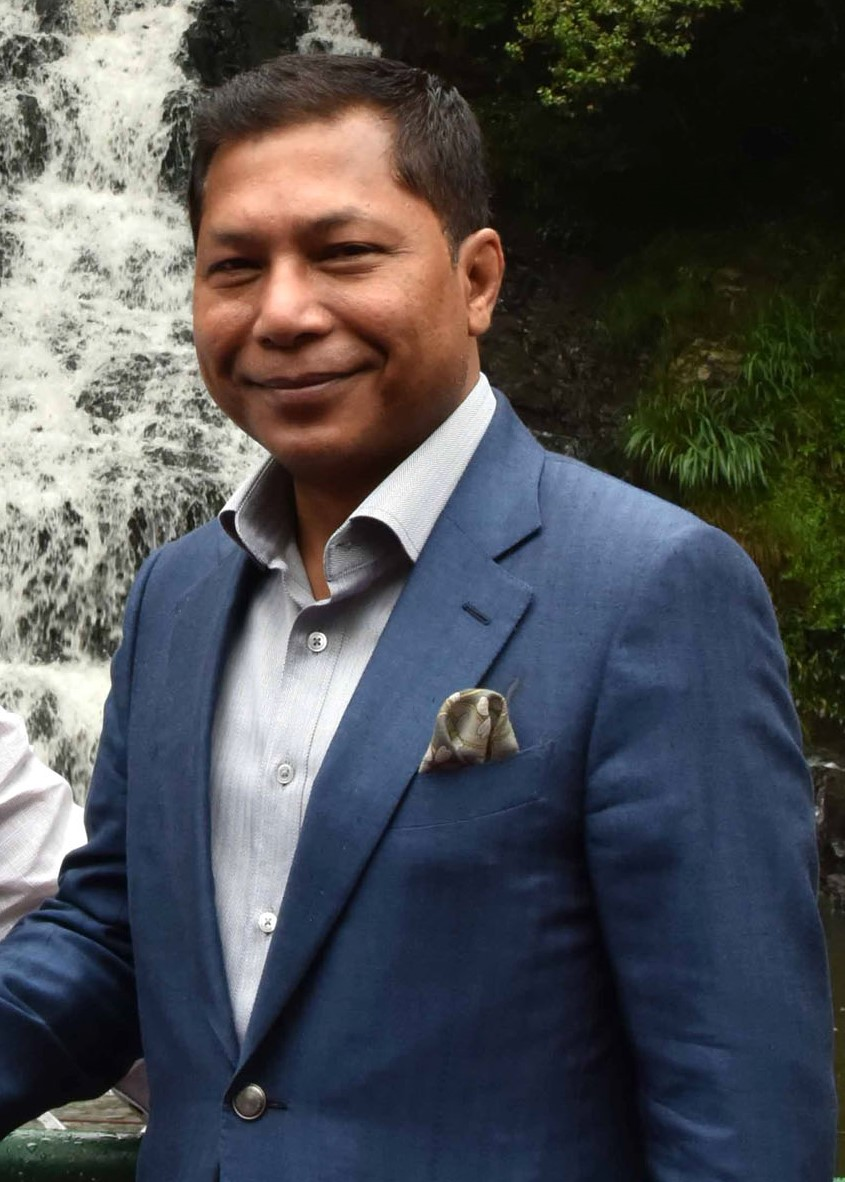
- Incumbent; Mukul Sangma since 28 August 2024
- Style: The Hon’ble
- Member of: Meghalaya Legislative Assembly
- Nominator: Members of the Official Opposition of the Legislative Assembly
- Appointer: Speaker of the Assembly
- Term length: 5 years Till the Assembly Continues

The Leader of the Opposition in the Meghalaya Legislative Assembly is an elected Member of the Legislative Assembly who leads the official opposition in the Meghalaya Legislative Assembly.

== Eligibility ==
Official Opposition is a term used in Meghalaya Legislative Assembly to designate the political party which has secured the second largest number of seats in the assembly. In order to get formal recognition, the party must have at least 10% of total membership of the Legislative Assembly.

== Role ==
The Opposition's main role is to question the government of the day and hold them accountable to the public. The Opposition is equally responsible for upholding the best interests of the people of the country. They have to ensure that the Government does not take any steps, which might have negative effects on the people of the state. There are actions of the ruling party which may be beneficial to the masses and opposition is expected to support such steps.

== List of Leaders of the Opposition ==
No	Name	Constituency	Tenure		Assembly (Election)	Chief Minister	Party
1.	Paty Ripple Kyndiah	Jaiaw	1979	1981	2nd (1978 election)	B. B. Lyngdoh	Indian National Congress
2.	P. A. Sangma	Tura	1990	1991	4th (1988 election)	B. B. Lyngdoh	Indian National Congress
3.	Admiral K. Sangma	Dalamgiri	2003	2008	7th (2003 election)	D. D. Lapang	Nationalist Congress Party
4.	D. D. Lapang	Nongpoh	2008	2009	8th (2008 election)	Donkupar Roy	Indian National Congress
5.	Conrad Sangma	Selsella	2009	2013	8th (2008 election)	D. D. Lapang	Nationalist Congress Party
5.	Conrad Sangma	Selsella	2009	2013	8th (2008 election)	Mukul Sangma	Nationalist Congress Party
6.	Donkupar Roy	Shella	2013	2018	9th (2013 election)	Mukul Sangma	United Democratic Party
7.	Mukul Sangma	Songsak	2018	2023	10th (2018 election)	Conrad Sangma	Indian National Congress
8.	Ronnie V. Lyngdoh	Mylliem	2023	2024	11th (2023 election)	Conrad Sangma	Indian National Congress
(7).	Mukul Sangma	Songsak	2024	Incumbent	11th (2023 election)	Conrad Sangma	Mamata All India Trinamool Congress
