= Sangma =

Sangma is an Indian surname. People with this surname include:

- P. A. Sangma: Indian politician, Speaker of Lok Sabha and Chief Minister of Meghalaya
- Admiral K. Sangma: Indian politician
- Agatha Sangma: Indian politician, daughter of P. A.
- Conrad Sangma: Indian politician, son of P. A.
- James Sangma: Indian politician
- Mukul Sangma: Indian politician, Chief Minister of Meghalaya
- Williamson A. Sangma: Indian politician, Chief Minister of Meghalaya

== See also ==
- Conrad Sangma ministry (disambiguation)
