= Beckstar Sangma =

Indian politician

Member of the Meghalaya Legislative Assembly
- In office 1993–2008
- Preceded by: Sherjee M. Sangma
- Succeeded by: James Sangma
- Constituency: Rongchugiri

Cabinet Minister, Government of Meghalaya
- In office December 2003 – May 2006
- Chief Minister: D. D. Lapang

Personal details
- Born: Beckstar K. Sangma
- Died: October 11, 2010 (aged 60–61) Shillong, Meghalaya, India
- Party: Indian National Congress
- Occupation: Politician

Beckstar Sangma was an Indian politician and member of the Nationalist Congress Party.

== Political career ==
Sangma was a member of the Meghalaya Legislative Assembly from the Rongchugiri constituency in West Garo Hills district as an Indian National Congress candidate in 1993 and 1998.

== Death ==
In the latter years, Sangma was diagnosed with throat cancer. He died on 11 October 2010 in Shillong. He was survived by his wife and four children.
