= Conrad Sangma ministry =

Conrad Sangma ministry may refer to these cabinets headed by Indian politician Conrad Sangma as the chief minister of Meghalaya:

- First Conrad Sangma ministry (2018–2023)
- Second Conrad Sangma ministry (2023–)

== See also ==
- Sangma (disambiguation)
