= Chief Minister of Meghalaya =

Leader of the executive branch of Government of Meghalaya

- Emblem of Meghalaya

- Flag of India

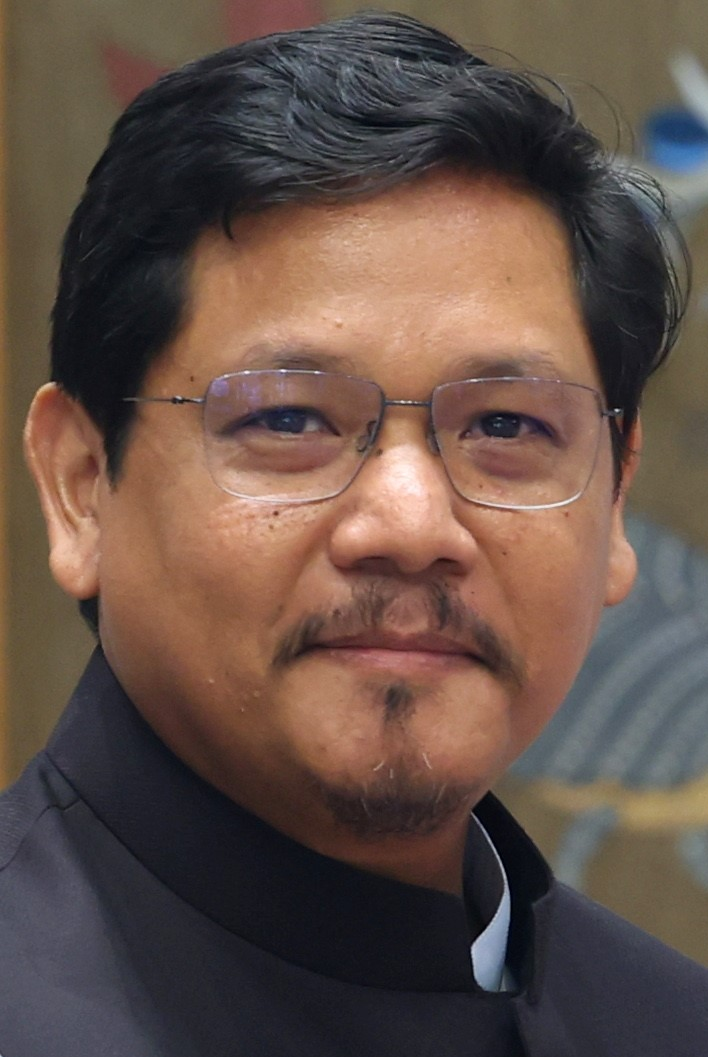
- Incumbent; Conrad Sangma since 6 March 2018
- Chief Minister's Office; Government of Meghalaya
- Style: The Honourable (formal); Mr. Chief Minister (informal)
- Type: Leader of the Executive
- Status: Head of government
- Abbreviation: CMoMeghalaya
- Member of: Legislative Assembly; State Cabinet
- Reports to: Governor of Meghalaya; Meghalaya Legislative Assembly
- Residence: Shillong
- Nominator: MLAs of the majority party or alliance
- Appointer: Governor of Meghalaya
- Term length: At the confidence of the assembly; Chief minister's term is for five years and is subject to no term limits.
- Inaugural holder: Williamson A. Sangma
- Formation: 2 April 1970 (56 years ago)
- Deputy: DCM
- Salary: ₹1.09 lakh (gross) per month

The chief minister of Meghalaya is the chief executive of the Indian state of Meghalaya. As per the Constitution of India, the governor is a state's de jure head, but de facto executive authority rests with the chief minister. Following elections to the Meghalaya Legislative Assembly, the state's governor usually invites the party (or coalition) with a majority of seats to form the government. The governor appoints the chief minister, whose council of ministers is collectively responsible to the assembly. Given that he has the confidence of the assembly, the chief minister's term is for five years and is subject to no term limits. Chief Minister also serves as Leader of the House in the Legislative Assembly.

Since 1970, twelve people have served as chief minister of Meghalaya. Six of these belonged to the Indian National Congress, including the inaugural officeholder Williamson A. Sangma. The current incumbent is Conrad Sangma of the National People's Party since 6 March 2018.

== Oath as the state chief minister ==
The chief minister serves five years in the office. The following is the oath of the Deputy chief minister of state:

I, <Name of Chief Minister>, do swear in the name of God/solemnly affirm that I will bear true faith and allegiance to the Constitution of India as by law established, that I will uphold the sovereignty and integrity of India, that I will faithfully and conscientiously discharge my duties as a Minister for the State of () and that I will do right to all manner of people in accordance with the Constitution and the law without fear or favour, affection or ill-will.

Oath of Secrecy

"I, [Name], do swear in the name of God / solemnly affirm that I will not directly or indirectly communicate or reveal to any person or persons any matter which shall be brought under my consideration or shall become known to me as a Minister for the State of [Name of State] except as may be required for the due discharge of my duties as such Minister.

== List of Chief Ministers (1970-present) ==
- ^{†} Died in office
- ^{§} Returned to office after a previous non-consecutive term

#	Portrait	Minister (Birth-Death) Constituency	Election	Term of office			Political party	Ministry
#	Portrait	Minister (Birth-Death) Constituency	Election	From	To	Period	Political party	Ministry
Autonomous State of Meghalaya (1970–1972)
1		Williamson A. Sangma (1919–1990); MLA for Baghmara	– (Interim)	2 April 1970	20 January 1972	1 year, 293 days	All Party Hill Leaders Conference	Williamson I
State of Meghalaya (1972–present)
(1)		Williamson A. Sangma (1919–1990); MLA for Baghmara	– (Interim)	21 January 1972	18 March 1972	6 years, 41 days	All Party Hill Leaders Conference	Williamson I
(1)		Williamson A. Sangma (1919–1990); MLA for Baghmara	1972 (1st)	18 March 1972	16 November 1976	6 years, 41 days	All Party Hill Leaders Conference	Williamson II
(1)		Williamson A. Sangma (1919–1990); MLA for Baghmara	1972 (1st)	16 November 1976	3 March 1978	6 years, 41 days	Indian National Congress	Williamson II
2		Darwin Diengdoh Pugh (1927–2008); MLA for Mawkhar	1978 (2nd)	10 March 1978	6 May 1979	1 year, 57 days	All Party Hill Leaders Conference	Pugh
3		B. B. Lyngdoh (1922–2003); MLA for Lyngkyrdem	1978 (2nd)	7 May 1979	7 May 1981	2 years, 0 days	All Party Hill Leaders Conference	Lyngdoh I
(1)		Williamson A. Sangma (1919–1990); MLA for Baghmara	1978 (2nd)	7 May 1981^{[§]}	2 March 1983	1 year, 299 days	Indian National Congress	Williamson III
(3)		B. B. Lyngdoh (1922–2003); MLA for Lyngkyrdem	1983 (3rd)	2 March 1983^{[§]}	1 April 1983	30 days	All Party Hill Leaders Conference	Lyngdoh II
(1)		Williamson A. Sangma (1919–1990); MLA for Baghmara	1983 (3rd)	2 April 1983^{[§]}	5 February 1988	4 years, 309 days	Indian National Congress	Williamson IV
4		Purno Agitok Sangma (1947–2016); MLA for Tura	1988 (4th)	6 February 1988	25 March 1990	2 years, 47 days	Indian National Congress	Purno
(3)		B. B. Lyngdoh (1922–2003); MLA for Lyngkyrdem	1988 (4th)	26 March 1990^{[§]}	10 October 1991	1 year, 198 days	Hill People's Union	Lyngdoh III
Position vacant (11 October 1991 – 5 February 1992); President's rule was imposed during this period (Note: President's rule may be imposed when the "government in a state is not able to function as per the Constitution", which often happens because no party or coalition has a majority in the assembly. When President's rule is in force in a state, its council of ministers stands dissolved. The office of chief minister thus lies vacant, and the administration is taken over by the governor, who functions on behalf of the central government. At times, the legislative assembly also stands dissolved.)
5		D. D. Lapang (1934-2025); MLA for Nongpoh	– (4th)	5 February 1992	19 February 1993	1 year, 14 days	Indian National Congress	Lapang I
6		S. C. Marak (1941–2024); MLA for Resubelpara	1993 (5th)	19 February 1993	27 February 1998	5 years, 19 days	Indian National Congress	Marak I
6		S. C. Marak (1941–2024); MLA for Resubelpara	1998 (6th)	27 February 1998	10 March 1998	5 years, 19 days	Indian National Congress	Marak II
(3)		B. B. Lyngdoh (1922–2003); MLA for Lyngkyrdem	1998 (6th)	10 March 1998^{[§]}	8 March 2000	1 year, 364 days	United Democratic Party	Lyngdoh IV
7		E. K. Mawlong (1946–2008); MLA for Umroi	1998 (6th)	8 March 2000	8 December 2001	1 year, 275 days	United Democratic Party	Mawlong
8		Flinder Anderson Khonglam (1945–2012); MLA for Sohra	1998 (6th)	8 December 2001	4 March 2003	1 year, 86 days	Independent	Khonglam
(5)		D. D. Lapang (1934-2025); MLA for Nongpoh	2003 (7th)	4 March 2003^{[§]}	15 June 2006	3 years, 103 days	Indian National Congress	Lapang II
9		J. Dringwell Rymbai (1934–2022); MLA for Jirang	2003 (7th)	15 June 2006	10 March 2007	268 days	Indian National Congress	Rymbai
(5)		D. D. Lapang (1934-2025); MLA for Nongpoh	2003 (7th)	10 March 2007^{[§]}	10 March 2008	1 year, 9 days	Indian National Congress	Lapang III
(5)		D. D. Lapang (1934-2025); MLA for Nongpoh	2008 (8th)	10 March 2008	19 March 2008	1 year, 9 days	Indian National Congress	Lapang IV
10		Donkupar Roy (1954–2019); MLA for Shella	2008 (8th)	19 March 2008	19 March 2009	1 year, 0 days	United Democratic Party	Roy
Position vacant (19 March – 12 May 2009); President's rule was imposed during this period
(5)		D. D. Lapang (1934-2025); MLA for Nongpoh	– (8th)	13 May 2009^{[§]}	19 April 2010	341 days	Indian National Congress	Lapang V
11		Mukul Sangma (born 1965); MLA for Ampati	– (8th)	20 April 2010	5 March 2013	7 years, 320 days	Indian National Congress	Mukul I
11		Mukul Sangma (born 1965); MLA for Ampati	2013 (9th)	5 March 2013	6 March 2018	7 years, 320 days	Indian National Congress	Mukul II
12		Conrad Sangma (born 1978); MLA for South Tura	2018 (10th)	6 March 2018	7 March 2023	8 years, 261 days	National People's Party	Conrad I
12		Conrad Sangma (born 1978); MLA for South Tura	2023 (11th)	7 March 2023	Incumbent	8 years, 261 days	National People's Party	Conrad II

== Statistics ==
#	Chief Minister	Party	Term of office	
#	Chief Minister	Party	Longest continuous term	Total duration of chief ministership
1.	Williamson A. Sangma	APHLC/INC	7 years, 335 days	14 years, 207 days
2.	Conrad Sangma	NPP	8 years, 261 days	8 years, 261 days
3.	Mukul Sangma	INC	7 years, 320 days	7 years, 320 days
4.	B. B. Lyngdoh	INC	2 years, 0 days	6 years, 102 days
5.	D. D. Lapang	INC	3 years, 103 days	5 years, 226 days
6.	S. C. Marak	INC	5 years, 19 days	5 years, 19 days
7.	P. A. Sangma	INC	2 years, 47 days	2 years, 47 days
8.	E. K. Mawlong	IND	1 year, 275 days	1 year, 275 days
9.	Flinder Anderson Khonglam	APHLC	1 year, 86 days	1 year, 86 days
10.	Darwin Diengdoh Pugh	APHLC	1 year, 57 days	1 year, 57 days
11.	Donkupar Roy	UDP	1 year, 0 days	1 year, 0 days
12.	J. Dringbell Rymbai	INC	268 days	268 days

== See also ==
- Government of Meghalaya
- Chief Ministers of India

== Notes ==
Footnotes
