= M. M. Jacob =

Indian politician (1926–2018)

Mundakkal Mathew Jacob
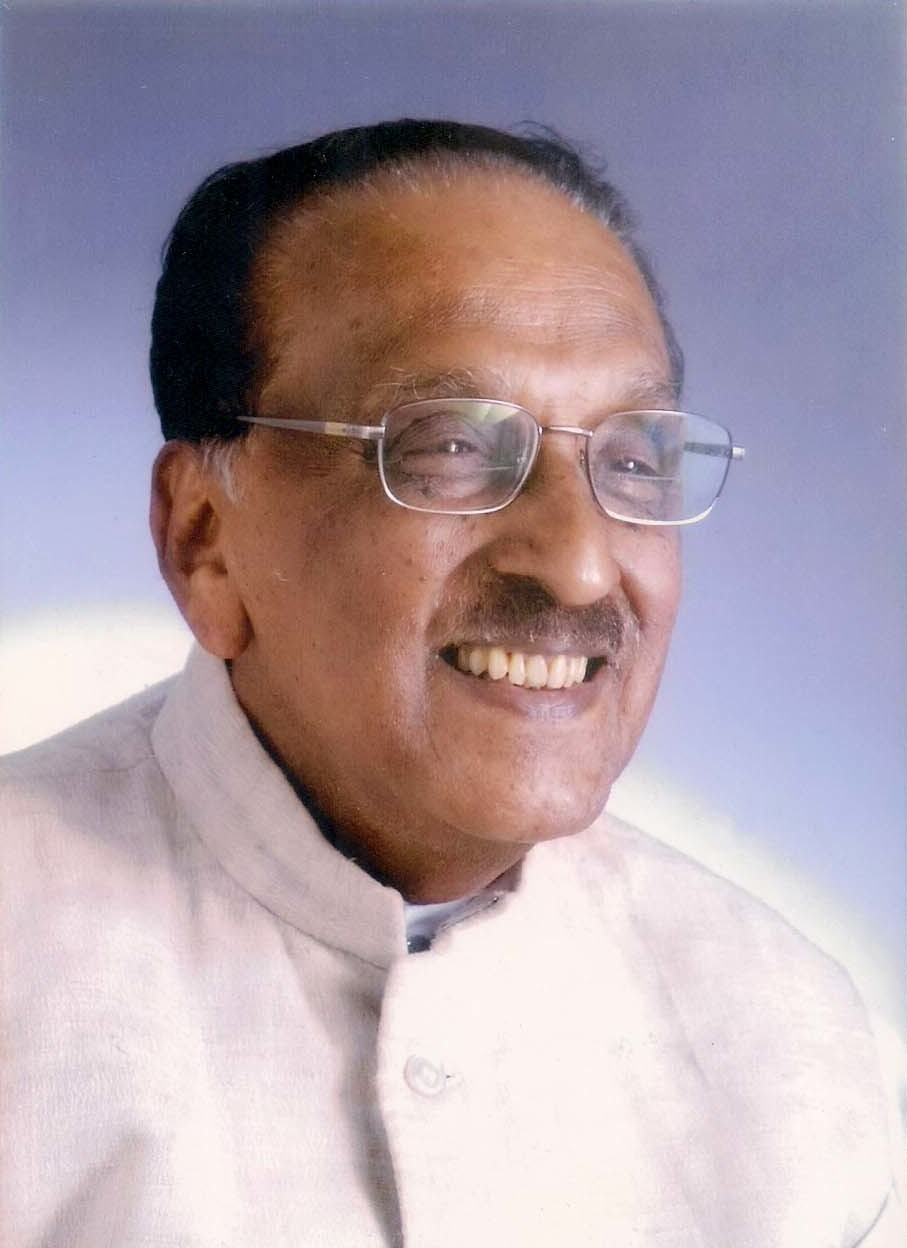

9th Governor of Meghalaya
- In office 19 June 1995 – 11 April 2007
- Chief Minister: S. C. Marak; B. B. Lyngdoh; E. K. Mawlong; Flinder Anderson Khonglam; D. D. Lapang; J. Dringwell Rymbai
- Preceded by: Madhukar Dighe
- Succeeded by: Banwari Lal Joshi

Governor of Arunachal Pradesh
- additional charge
- In office 24 January 2007 – 6 April 2007
- Chief Minister: Gegong Apang
- Preceded by: Shilendra Kumar Singh
- Succeeded by: K. Sankaranarayanan (additional charge)

Deputy Chairman of the Rajya Sabha
- In office Feb 1986 – Dec 1986
- Chairman: Shankar Dayal Sharma

Personal details
- Born: 9 August 1926
- Died: 8 July 2018 (aged 91) Pala, Kerala, India
- Spouse: Achamma Kunnuthara
- Children: 4
- Education: University College Thiruvananthapuram; Lucknow University; University of Chicago; Sacred Heart College, Thevara; Loyola College, Chennai

M. M. Jacob (9 August 1926 – 8 July 2018), in full Mundakkal Mathew Jacob, was an Indian politician, working in the Indian National Congress. He married Achamma Kunnuthara from Tiruvalla, Kerala (since deceased) and had four daughters. He was appointed Governor of Meghalaya in 1995 and again in 2000. He was also Governor of Arunachal Pradesh for a few months in 1996. He is the longest serving governor of any Indian state, having served for more than 11 years.

== Education ==
He was educated at the University College, Trivandrum, Sacred Heart College, Thevara in Cochin, Loyola College, Madras, and Lucknow University. He was a graduate in law and had a master's degree in political science. He held a diploma in income tax law as well. He did a course in social work at the University of Chicago, USA.

== Career ==
=== Cooperative Movement ===
Jacob played a leading role in the cooperative movement. He served as President of the Kerala State Cooperative Rubber Marketing Federation (1975–1981). He also served as Director of the Kottayam District Cooperative Bank, the Pala Rubber Marketing Cooperative Society, and Director (later Chairman) of the Chitralekha Film Cooperative Society, Trivandrum for over a decade, with extensive experience on boards and in corporations.

He was Chairman of the Kerala state-owned Plantation Corporation, Ltd (1974–1978) and the first chairman of Oil Palm India (1977–1978). He served as a member of the Governing Board of the Indian government-owned Hindustan Latex (1975–1978), the Indian Coffee Board (1973–1975) and the Indian Rubber Board under the Commerce Ministry for many years. He worked as Chairman of the National Alliance of Young Entrepreneurs, Kerala Branch (1974–1976). He also served as Director of the Indian Overseas Bank (1977–1982) and the Kerala State Red Cross. He was on the State Tourist Advisory Board, Small Scale Industries Board (SISIS, 1975) at the state level before being elected to Parliament. Active in the YMCA movement, he served as board chairman of Management at the YMCA Institute of Engineering in Faridabad from 1991 to 1994.

=== Indian National Congress political party ===
Jacob was a permanent invitee of the Congress Working Committee. He was in charge of party affairs in Jammu and Karnataka. He was an elected member of the All India Congress Committee for many years. He also worked as General Secretary and Treasurer of the Kerala Pradesh Congress Committee and as Chairman of the Kerala Seva Dal.

=== Publisher and editor ===
He published Bharat Sevak, a social worker's journal, and was the chief editor of Congress Review, fortnightly published from Trivandrum, and the managing director of Veekshanam, a Malayalam daily newspaper published from Cochin. He has published several papers and articles in journals and periodicals. Besides, he has compiled and published a few books. He has presented many papers in national and international seminars in India and abroad.

=== In Parliament ===
Jacob was elected to the Rajya Sabha in 1982 and again in 1988. He served as Chairman of the Committee on Subordinate Legislation (1984–1985) and as Chairman of the Parliament Standing Committee for the Ministry of Home Affairs (1993–1994). He was elected Deputy Chairman of the Rajya Sabha in 1986, and later served as a Union Minister of State in the Ministries of Parliamentary Affairs, Water Resources and Home Affairs at different periods (during 1987–1993).

=== Representing India in World Forums ===
As a youth leader, he participated in the sixth World Youth Festival in Moscow (1957) and the International Conference of Work Camp Leaders organised by UNESCO (1956). He led India's youth delegation to North Vietnam (1957) and later the Indian youth delegation to China (1957), was a youth delegate to the Cleveland International Programme for youth leaders and social workers, USA (1963) and the International Conference of youth leaders from developing countries in Bonn, Germany in 1968. He was also a delegate to the International Seminar on Social Administration at Western Reserve University in Cleveland, Ohio, USA (1976). He was a member of the Indian delegation to Kuala Lumpur, Malaysia for the International Conference of Natural Rubber Producing Countries in 1975, and led the Indian delegation to Sri Lanka for the same conference in 1980.

=== Indian Parliament and Commonwealth representative ===
As Deputy Chairman Rajya Sabha, Jacob attended the Commonwealth Parliament conference in London in 1986. He was also leader of the Indian Parliamentary Delegation to Zaire in 1986 (now the Democratic Republic of the Congo), Leader of the Indian delegation to Inter-Parliamentary Union Conference in Budapest (1989) and a delegate at the Disarmament Conference organised by the Inter-Parliamentary Union and the United Nations in Mexico (1985).

He attended the United Nations General Assembly, New York (1985 and again in 1993) and the Human Rights Conference held at the European Parliament in Strasbourg, France (1993). He was a delegate to Human Rights Conference in Vienna, Austria organised by the U.N. (1994). He represented the Commonwealth Parliamentary Association (C.P.A.) in Accra, Ghana at the seminar of Ghana Parliamentarians (1993) and was a Commonwealth Observer monitoring the first post apartheid general election in South Africa in 1994.

== Later activities ==
Jacob had a keen interest in the traditional forms of local democracy in tribal areas, particularly in Meghalaya, and advocated a marriage of modernity and tradition to strengthen grassroots democracy in tribal areas.

He died on 8 July 2018 at the age of 91.
