= Percylina Marak =

Member, Meghalaya Legislative Assembly
- In office 1972–1978
- Constituency: Rongram

Personal details
- Party: All Party Hill Leaders Conference

Percylina Marak was an Indian politician from Meghalaya and a member of the All Party Hill Leaders Conference. She represented the Rongram constituency in West Garo Hills district in the Meghalaya Legislative Assembly from 1972 to 1978.

== Political career ==
=== 1972 election ===
She was the only woman elected in Meghalaya's first state assembly election, held on 9 March 1972.

== Death ==
Marak was murdered in Boko, Assam, on 13 December 1979.
