= 2009 Indian general election in Meghalaya =

Indian general election in Meghalaya, 2009
- April–May 2009

2 seats
- Turnout: 64.38%
	First party
	UPA
Party	UPA
Last election	1
Seats won	2
Seat change	▲1
Percentage	44.84%
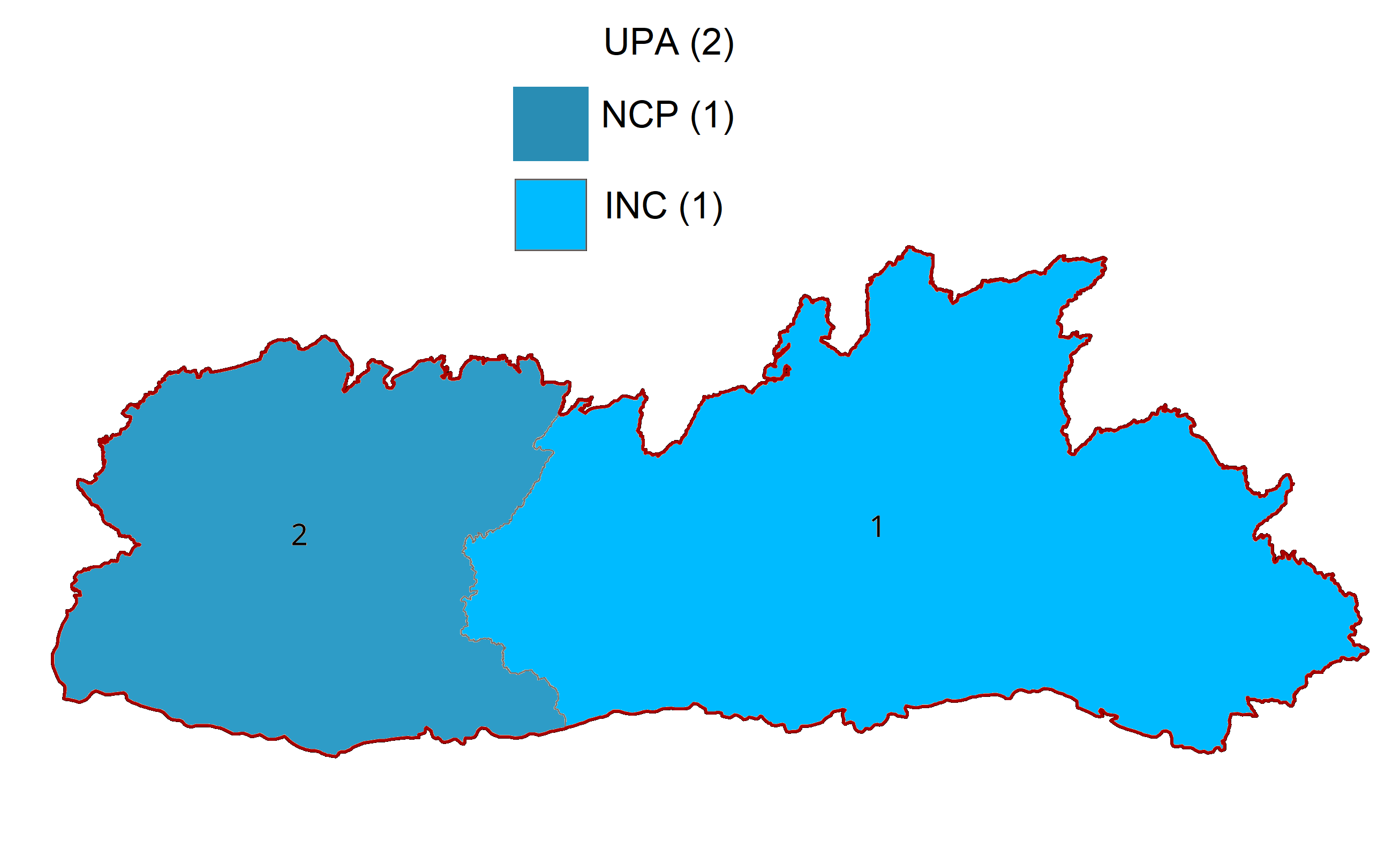
- Meghalaya
Prime Minister before election
Manmohan Singh
INC
Prime Minister after election
Manmohan Singh
INC

The 2009 Indian general election was held for two seats in the state of Meghalaya. Both the seats, namely, Shillong and Tura, are reserved for Scheduled Tribes.

== Nominations ==
A total of 11 candidates (8 men and 3 women) filed nominations with the Election Commission of India (ECI). Among these, none of the nominations were rejected / withdrawn. Thus, all 11 candidates (8 men and 3 women) contested elections.

== Contested Parties ==
Party	Flag	Symbol	Leader	Seats contested
Indian National Congress			Vincent Pala	2
Nationalist Congress Party			P. A. Sangma	1
United Democratic Party (Meghalaya)			Donkupar Roy	1
Hill State People's Democratic Party				1

== Results ==
One seat each was shared by the Indian National Congress and the Nationalist Congress Party. Out of total 11 candidates contesting, deposits of 6 candidates (5 men and 1 woman) were forfeited for failing to secure more than one-sixth (16.7%) of the total valid votes cast.

Results by Party

Party Name	Popular vote			Seats		
Party Name	Votes	%	±pp	Contested	Won	+/−
INC	3,68,801	44.84	▼0.71	2	1	Steady
NCP	1,54,476	18.78	Steady	1	1	▲1
UDP	1,24,402	15.12	Steady	1	0	Steady
HSPDP	97,613	11.87	Steady	1	0	Steady
MDP	8,946	1.09	Steady	1	0	Steady
CPI	6,802	0.83	Steady	1	0	Steady
Others	40,204	4.89	Steady	1	0	Steady
IND	21,322	2.59	▼14.96	3	0	Steady
Total	8,22,566	100%	-	11	2	-

== Constituency wise results ==
Constituency		Winner				Runner-up				Margin	
Constituency		Candidate	Party	Votes	%	Candidate	Party	Votes	%	Votes	%
1	Shillong	Vincent Pala	INC	232,270	48.35	John Filmore Kharshiing	UDP	124,402	25.90	107,868	22.45
2	Tura	Agatha K. Sangma	NCP	154,476	45.14	Deborah C. Marak	INC	136,531	39.90	17,945	5.24

== Post-election Union Council of Ministers from Meghalaya ==
#	Name	Constituency	Designation	Department	From	To	Party
1	Vincent Pala	Shillong	MoS	Water Resources	28 May 2009	27 October 2012	INC
1	Vincent Pala	Shillong	MoS	Minority Affairs	19 January 2011	27 October 2012	INC
2	Agatha Sangma	Tura	MoS	Rural Development	28 May 2009	27 October 2012	NCP

== Assembly segments wise lead of parties ==
Party	Assembly segments	Position in Assembly (as of 2008 elections)
Indian National Congress	38	25
Nationalist Congress Party	16	14
Hill State People's Democratic Party	4	2
United Democratic Party	2	11
Others	0	8
Total	60	
