= B. B. Lyngdoh =

Indian politician (1922–2003)

3rd Chief Minister of Meghalaya
- In office 10 March 1998 – 8 March 2000
- Governor: M. M. Jacob
- Preceded by: S. C. Marak
- Succeeded by: E. K. Mawlong
- In office 26 March 1990 – 10 October 1991
- Governor: A. A. Rahim; Madhukar Dighe
- Preceded by: P. A. Sangma
- Succeeded by: D. D. Lapang
- In office 2 March 1983 – 31 March 1983
- Governor: Prakash Mehrotra
- Preceded by: Williamson A. Sangma
- Succeeded by: Williamson A. Sangma
- In office 7 May 1979 – 7 May 1981
- Governor: Lallan Prasad Singh
- Preceded by: Darwin Diengdoh Pugh
- Succeeded by: Williamson A. Sangma

Personal details
- Born: 2 February 1922 Bengal Presidency, British Raj
- Died: 27 October 2003 (aged 81) Shillong, Meghalaya, India
- Party: All Party Hill Leaders Conference
- Education: Scottish Church College

Brington Buhai Lyngdoh or B. B. Lyngdoh (2 February 1922 – 27 October 2003) was an Indian politician from Meghalaya. He was a prominent leader in the movement for a separate state for the tribal people of the hills of the Assam. He was the third Chief Minister of Meghalaya, and served four incomplete terms between 1979 and 2000. He is often referred to as the 'Father of Coalition Politics' in the state.

== Early life ==
On 2 February 1922, Brington was born to Ajra Singh and Nerimai Lyngdoh in Laitlyngkot village. He started schooling at Ramakrishna Mission School in Shillong and Cherrapunjee. He attended high school at Government Boys High School. In 1939 he appeared in and secured the first position at the All Khasi and Jaintia Hills M.E. Scholarship Examination. In 1944, he completed his matriculation, after which he joined Guwahati's Cotton College where he completed his Intermediate in Science and attained a Letter Mark in several subjects.

He then attended the Scottish Church College in Calcutta where he took Economics and Mathematics. He later switched to the Arts stream because of his interest in public service. Unfortunately, due to the prevailing Hindu-Muslim riots there at that time, he was forced to return and complete his studies at St. Edmund's College in 1948. He returned to Calcutta University and completed his LLB in 1951.

== Career ==
He began teaching at Mawkhar Christian High School for a year before joining the Shillong Bar in 1952. He was soon elected General Secretary of the newly formed Hills Tribal Union in 1954 (later called the All Party Hills Leaders Conference) in Tura, led by Captain Williamson A. Sangma, whose main agenda was the attainment of a separate State for the six Assam Hills Autonomous districts.

In 1962, B.B. Lyngdoh won his first election and a seat from the Nongpoh constituency of the Assam Assembly. In 1970, he joined the Meghalaya Autonomous State Cabinet as Finance Minister, a position he continued in till after Meghalaya attained full statehood in 1972. With the dissolution of the All Party Hills Leaders Conference in 1976, he contested again in 1978 from Langkyrdem Assembly constituency constituency and won.

In May 1979 Lyngdoh was chosen as the chief minister to lead India's first coalition government. In 1980, he attended the Commonwealth Conference at Lusaka, Zambia as Chief Minister.

In March 1983, Lyngdoh entered another coalition government with the HSPDP and became Chief Minister again. In less than a month, the Indian National Congress sponsored a no-confidence vote against the Meghalaya United Parliamentary Party government and Lyngdoh lost the vote by 31 votes to 27. He soon tendered his resignation to the state governor Prakash Mehrotra.

In 1988, he initiated the All Parties Coalition Government with P.A. Sangma as Chief Minister while he served as chairman, State Planning Board. In 1990, he became the Chief Minister for the third time where he successfully introduced the M.L.A. Scheme to the country.

In 1992, B.B. Lyngdoh formed the Meghalaya Federation. In 1993, he contested in and successively won the Meghalaya Assembly elections for the seventh time and was elected Leader of The Opposition.

In 1998, he was re-elected to the Sixth Legislative Assembly. Part of the United Democratic Party (UDP), which had won 20 seats, chose Lyngdoh to the chief minister for the fourth time. UDP was in coalition with the Indian National Congress and had decided that the term would be split equally between the parties. However, this agreement was short-lived.

== Death and legacy ==
Lyngdoh died at the Shillong Civil Hospital on 27 October 2003 at the age of 81. He was previously hospitalised for a chest infection and pneumonia. He was survived by a son and daughter.

In 2022 the BB Lyngdoh Birth Centenary Celebration Committee organised meetings to commemorate the centenary of his birth.
