= Rongram Assembly constituency =

Constituency of the Meghalaya legislative assembly in India

Rongram
- Former constituency for the Meghalaya Legislative Assembly

Constituency details
- Country: India
- Region: Northeast India
- State: Meghalaya
- Established: 1972
- Abolished: 2013
- Total electors: 19,932

Rongram Assembly constituency was an assembly constituency in the India state of Meghalaya.

== Members of the Legislative Assembly ==
Election	Member	Party
1972	Percylina R. Marak	All Party Hill Leaders Conference
1978	Crunden S. Sangma	All Party Hill Leaders Conference
1983	Crunden S. Sangma	All Party Hill Leaders Conference
1988	Godwin D. Shira	Indian National Congress
1993	Mathrona Marak	Indian National Congress
1998	Methrona Marak	Indian National Congress
2003	Sengman R. Marak	Independent politician
2008	Ismail R. Marak	Independent politician

== Election results ==
=== Assembly Election 2008 ===
2008 Meghalaya Legislative Assembly election: Rongram
Party	Candidate	Votes	%	±%
Independent	Ismail R. Marak	5,260	29.19%	New
INC	Sengman R. Marak	3,726	20.68%	▲13.85
NCP	Purno K. Sangma	2,789	15.48%	▼5.21
Independent	Crinathson A. Sangma	2,085	11.57%	New
Independent	Andreas T.Sangma	1,929	10.70%	New
Independent	Brenzield Ch.Marak	645	3.58%	New
Independent	Ronald Momin	463	2.57%	New
Margin of victory		1,534	8.51%	▼1.64
Turnout		18,021	90.41%	▲20.77
Registered electors		19,932		▼9.80
Independent hold		Swing	▼1.65	

=== Assembly Election 2003 ===
2003 Meghalaya Legislative Assembly election: Rongram
Party	Candidate	Votes	%	±%
Independent	Sengman R. Marak	4,746	30.84%	New
NCP	Crinathson A. Sangma	3,184	20.69%	New
Independent	Dr. H. Jimmy Momin	2,293	14.90%	New
Independent	Methrona Marak	1,534	9.97%	New
INC	Salman Sangma	1,050	6.82%	▼15.91
Independent	Kendura K. Sangma	972	6.32%	New
Independent	Arwish Marak	609	3.96%	New
Margin of victory		1,562	10.15%	▲3.63
Turnout		15,389	69.64%	▲2.53
Registered electors		22,097		▲11.18
Independent gain from INC		Swing	▲8.11	

=== Assembly Election 1998 ===
1998 Meghalaya Legislative Assembly election: Rongram
Party	Candidate	Votes	%	±%
INC	Methrona Marak	3,032	22.73%	▼1.29
Independent	Cary Marak	2,162	16.21%	New
GNC	Rohidas Marak	1,526	11.44%	New
Independent	Francis A. Sangma	1,436	10.77%	New
UDP	Godwin D. Shira	1,379	10.34%	New
Independent	Salman Sangma	1,080	8.10%	New
Independent	Kandura K. Sangma	938	7.03%	New
Margin of victory		870	6.52%	▲5.17
Turnout		13,338	69.58%	▼10.58
Registered electors		19,875		▲22.95
INC hold		Swing	▼1.29	

=== Assembly Election 1993 ===
1993 Meghalaya Legislative Assembly election: Rongram
Party	Candidate	Votes	%	±%
INC	Mathrona Marak	3,017	24.02%	▼8.86
MPPP	Godwin D. Shira	2,847	22.67%	New
Independent	Cary Marak	2,378	18.94%	New
HPU	Rohidas Marak	1,982	15.78%	▲6.40
AHL(AM)	Crunden S. Sangma	1,980	15.77%	New
Independent	Peterlawford Marak	207	1.65%	New
Independent	Sinreng Momin	147	1.17%	New
Margin of victory		170	1.35%	▼11.86
Turnout		12,558	80.11%	▲2.08
Registered electors		16,165		▲25.01
INC hold		Swing	▼8.86	

=== Assembly Election 1988 ===
1988 Meghalaya Legislative Assembly election: Rongram
Party	Candidate	Votes	%	±%
INC	Godwin D. Shira	3,215	32.88%	▼4.03
Independent	Clement Marak	1,923	19.67%	New
HPU	Wilnan A. Sangma	917	9.38%	New
Independent	Peterlawford Marak	237	2.42%	New
Margin of victory		1,292	13.21%	▲3.84
Turnout		9,777	78.73%	▲3.00
Registered electors		12,931		▲18.80
INC gain from AHL		Swing	▼13.41	

=== Assembly Election 1983 ===
1983 Meghalaya Legislative Assembly election: Rongram
Party	Candidate	Votes	%	±%
AHL	Crunden S. Sangma	3,659	46.29%	▲9.33
INC	Godwin D. Shira	2,918	36.92%	▲9.47
Independent	Garnath S. Bangshal	523	6.62%	New
Independent	Emithson Marak	373	4.72%	New
Independent	Binsing Marak	313	3.96%	New
Independent	Jogen A. Sangma	118	1.49%	New
Margin of victory		741	9.38%	▲8.01
Turnout		7,904	75.29%	▲18.51
Registered electors		10,885		▲10.33
AHL hold		Swing	▲9.33	

=== Assembly Election 1978 ===
1978 Meghalaya Legislative Assembly election: Rongram
Party	Candidate	Votes	%	±%
AHL	Crunden S. Sangma	1,973	36.96%	▼16.81
Independent	Godwin D. Shira	1,900	35.59%	New
INC	Percylina R. Marak	1,465	27.44%	New
Margin of victory		73	1.37%	▼14.58
Turnout		5,338	57.74%	▲23.52
Registered electors		9,866		▲35.54
AHL hold		Swing		

=== Assembly Election 1972 ===
1972 Meghalaya Legislative Assembly election: Rongram
Party	Candidate	Votes	%	±%
AHL	Percylina R. Marak	1,197	53.77%	New
Independent	Miriam D Shira	842	37.83%	New
Independent	Janathon Sangma	187	8.40%	New
Margin of victory		355	15.95%	
Turnout		2,226	33.37%	
Registered electors		7,279		
AHL win (new seat)				
