= Jowai Assembly constituency =

Legislative Assembly constituency in Meghalaya State, India

Coordinates: 25.45°N 92.2°E

Jowai
- Constituency No. 2 for the Meghalaya Legislative Assembly

Constituency details
- Country: India
- Region: Northeast India
- State: Meghalaya
- District: West Jaintia Hills
- Lok Sabha constituency: Shillong
- Established: 1972
- Total electors: 40,581
- Reservation: ST

Member of Legislative Assembly
- 11th Meghalaya Legislative Assembly
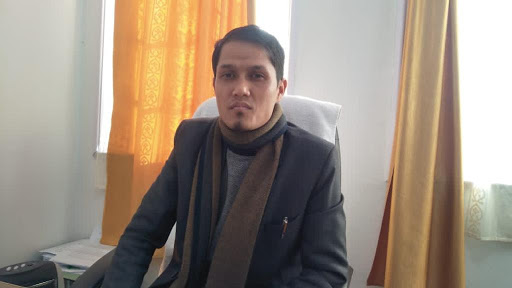
- Incumbent Wailadmiki Shylla
- Party: NPP
- Alliance: NDA
- Elected year: 2023

Jowai is one of 60 Legislative Assembly constituencies of Meghalaya state in India. It is part of the West Jaintia Hills district and is reserved for candidates belonging to Scheduled Tribes. It is part of the Shillong Lok Sabha constituency, and the current MLA is Wailadmiki Shylla of the National People's Party.

== Members of the Legislative Assembly ==
| Year | Name | Party |
Assam
| 1952 | U. Kistobinu Rymbai | Independent politician |
| 1957 | Larsingh Khyriem | Independent politician |
| 1962 | Enowell Pohshna | All Party Hill Leaders Conference |
| 1967 | Edwingson Barch | All Party Hill Leaders Conference |
Meghalaya
| 1972 | B. B. Shallam | All Party Hill Leaders Conference |
| 1978 | Tylli Kyndiah | Independent politician |
| 1983 | Dr. Roytre Christopher Laloo | Indian National Congress |
| 1988 | Dr. Roytre Christopher Laloo | Indian National Congress |
| 1993 | Dr. Roytre Christopher Laloo | Indian National Congress |
| 1998 | Singh Mulieh | United Democratic Party |
| 2003 | Singh Mulieh | United Democratic Party |
| 2008 | Dr. Roytre Christopher Laloo | Indian National Congress |
| 2013 | Dr. Roytre Christopher Laloo | Indian National Congress |
| 2018 | Wailadmiki Shylla | National People's Party |
| 2023 | Wailadmiki Shylla | National People's Party |

== Election results ==
=== Assembly Election 2023 ===
2023 Meghalaya Legislative Assembly election: Jowai
| Party | Candidate | Votes | % | ±% |
|---|---|---|---|---|
| NPP | Wailadmiki Shylla | 14,079 | 38.79% | ▲6.00 |
| AITC | Awhai Andrew Shullai | 11,412 | 31.44% | New |
| UDP | Moonlight Pariat | 10,260 | 28.27% | ▼0.51 |
| BJP | Allan Keith Suchiang | 326 | 0.90% | ▼4.34 |
| INC | Daniel Dann | 216 | 0.60% | ▼26.68 |
| NOTA | None of the Above | 423 | 1.17% | ▲0.73 |
| Margin of victory | | 2,667 | 7.35% | ▲3.34 |
| Turnout | | 36,293 | 90.48% | ▼4.44 |
| Registered electors | | 40,581 | | ▲17.22 |
| NPP hold | | Swing | ▲6.00 | |

=== Assembly Election 2018 ===
2018 Meghalaya Legislative Assembly election: Jowai
| Party | Candidate | Votes | % | ±% |
|---|---|---|---|---|
| NPP | Wailadmiki Shylla | 10,657 | 32.79% | New |
| UDP | Moonlight Pariat | 9,354 | 28.78% | ▲3.08 |
| INC | Awhai Andrew Shullai | 8,863 | 27.27% | ▼9.89 |
| BJP | Marki Mulieh | 1,702 | 5.24% | New |
| AAP | Banrilang Jungai | 89 | 0.27% | New |
| NOTA | None of the Above | 141 | 0.43% | New |
| Margin of victory | | 1,303 | 4.01% | ▲1.35 |
| Turnout | | 32,500 | 93.88% | ▲5.50 |
| Registered electors | | 34,620 | | ▲19.73 |
| NPP gain from INC | | Swing | ▼4.37 | |

=== Assembly Election 2013 ===
2013 Meghalaya Legislative Assembly election: Jowai
| Party | Candidate | Votes | % | ±% |
|---|---|---|---|---|
| INC | Dr. Roytre Christopher Laloo | 9,496 | 37.16% | ▼2.99 |
| Independent | Moonlight Pariat | 8,817 | 34.50% | New |
| UDP | Singh Mulieh | 6,568 | 25.70% | ▼11.36 |
| Independent | Heimon Hinge | 673 | 2.63% | New |
| Margin of victory | | 679 | 2.66% | ▼0.43 |
| Turnout | | 25,554 | 88.38% | ▼3.79 |
| Registered electors | | 28,915 | | ▲38.74 |
| INC hold | | Swing | ▼2.99 | |

=== Assembly Election 2008 ===
2008 Meghalaya Legislative Assembly election: Jowai
| Party | Candidate | Votes | % | ±% |
|---|---|---|---|---|
| INC | Dr. Roytre Christopher Laloo | 7,712 | 40.15% | ▼5.57 |
| UDP | Singh Mulieh | 7,119 | 37.06% | ▼12.30 |
| NCP | Moonlight Pariat | 4,377 | 22.79% | ▲19.00 |
| Margin of victory | | 593 | 3.09% | ▼0.55 |
| Turnout | | 19,208 | 92.16% | ▲15.30 |
| Registered electors | | 20,841 | | ▼11.83 |
| INC gain from UDP | | Swing | | |

=== Assembly Election 2003 ===
2003 Meghalaya Legislative Assembly election: Jowai
| Party | Candidate | Votes | % | ±% |
|---|---|---|---|---|
| UDP | Singh Mulieh | 8,967 | 49.36% | ▼1.25 |
| INC | Dr. Roytre Christopher Laloo | 8,306 | 45.72% | ▼3.67 |
| NCP | Phidalia Toi | 688 | 3.79% | New |
| BJP | Philomath Passah | 128 | 0.70% | New |
| Independent | Noren Talang | 78 | 0.43% | New |
| Margin of victory | | 661 | 3.64% | ▲2.42 |
| Turnout | | 18,167 | 76.93% | ▼4.30 |
| Registered electors | | 23,636 | | ▲10.64 |
| UDP hold | | Swing | ▼1.25 | |

=== Assembly Election 1998 ===
1998 Meghalaya Legislative Assembly election: Jowai
| Party | Candidate | Votes | % | ±% |
|---|---|---|---|---|
| UDP | Singh Mulieh | 8,775 | 50.61% | New |
| INC | Dr. Roytre Christopher Laloo | 8,563 | 49.39% | ▲5.98 |
| Margin of victory | | 212 | 1.22% | ▼9.55 |
| Turnout | | 17,338 | 82.69% | ▼2.63 |
| Registered electors | | 21,363 | | ▲2.61 |
| UDP gain from INC | | Swing | | |

=== Assembly Election 1993 ===
1993 Meghalaya Legislative Assembly election: Jowai
| Party | Candidate | Votes | % | ±% |
|---|---|---|---|---|
| INC | Roytre Christopher Laloo | 7,572 | 43.41% | ▲8.73 |
| Independent | Singh Mulieh | 5,692 | 32.63% | New |
| HPU | Raingmon Pssah | 4,180 | 23.96% | ▼3.09 |
| Margin of victory | | 1,880 | 10.78% | ▲3.15 |
| Turnout | | 17,444 | 84.81% | ▼2.92 |
| Registered electors | | 20,819 | | ▲71.76 |
| INC hold | | Swing | | |

=== Assembly Election 1988 ===
1988 Meghalaya Legislative Assembly election: Jowai
| Party | Candidate | Votes | % | ±% |
|---|---|---|---|---|
| INC | Dr. Roytre Christopher Laloo | 3,645 | 34.68% | ▲7.95 |
| HPU | Guinton Passah | 2,843 | 27.05% | New |
| Independent | Singh Mulieh | 2,578 | 24.53% | New |
| HSPDP | Yooshida Shilla | 726 | 6.91% | ▼0.65 |
| Independent | Thandajai Dakhar | 718 | 6.83% | New |
| Margin of victory | | 802 | 7.63% | ▲1.33 |
| Turnout | | 10,510 | 87.77% | ▲8.74 |
| Registered electors | | 12,121 | | ▲10.27 |
| INC hold | | Swing | ▲7.95 | |

=== Assembly Election 1983 ===
1983 Meghalaya Legislative Assembly election: Jowai
| Party | Candidate | Votes | % | ±% |
|---|---|---|---|---|
| INC | Dr. Roytre Christopher Laloo | 2,291 | 26.73% | ▲22.78 |
| APHLC | Tylli Kundiah | 1,751 | 20.43% | New |
| Independent | Singh Mulieh | 1,750 | 20.42% | New |
| Independent | Gordon D. Pae | 1,709 | 19.94% | New |
| HSPDP | Disingh Shallam | 648 | 7.56% | ▼13.02 |
| Independent | Thandajai Dakhar | 421 | 4.91% | New |
| Margin of victory | | 540 | 6.30% | ▼0.67 |
| Turnout | | 8,570 | 80.39% | ▼0.50 |
| Registered electors | | 10,992 | | ▲23.16 |
| INC gain from Independent | | Swing | ▼5.11 | |

=== Assembly Election 1978 ===
1978 Meghalaya Legislative Assembly election: Jowai
| Party | Candidate | Votes | % | ±% |
|---|---|---|---|---|
| Independent | Tylli Kyndiah | 2,230 | 31.84% | New |
| Independent | Disingh Shallam | 1,742 | 24.88% | New |
| HSPDP | Showaless K. Shilla | 1,441 | 20.58% | New |
| Independent | Gordon D. Pae | 1,262 | 18.02% | New |
| INC | Beryl Lamare | 277 | 3.96% | ▼25.49 |
| Independent | Peter Kir Nikhla | 29 | 0.41% | New |
| Independent | Ebarlis Lalar | 22 | 0.31% | New |
| Margin of victory | | 488 | 6.97% | ▼12.72 |
| Turnout | | 7,003 | 79.57% | ▲6.61 |
| Registered electors | | 8,925 | | ▲8.41 |
| Independent gain from APHLC | | Swing | ▼17.29 | |

=== Assembly Election 1972 ===
1972 Meghalaya Legislative Assembly election: Jowai
| Party | Candidate | Votes | % | ±% |
|---|---|---|---|---|
| APHLC | B. B. Shallam | 2,907 | 49.14% | New |
| INC | Gordon D. Pae | 1,742 | 29.45% | New |
| Independent | Bnein Bareh | 758 | 12.81% | New |
| Independent | Devilin Talang | 361 | 6.10% | New |
| Independent | Indro Pariat | 148 | 2.50% | New |
| Margin of victory | | 1,165 | 19.69% | |
| Turnout | | 5,916 | 73.30% | |
| Registered electors | | 8,233 | | |
| APHLC win (new seat) | | | | |

== See also ==
- List of constituencies of the Meghalaya Legislative Assembly
- Jowai
- Shillong (Lok Sabha constituency)
- West Jaintia Hills district
