= Sohra Assembly constituency =

Legislative Assembly constituency in Meghalaya State, India

Coordinates: 25.27°N 91.73°E

Sohra
- Constituency No. 28 for the Meghalaya Legislative Assembly

Constituency details
- Country: India
- Region: Northeast India
- State: Meghalaya
- District: East Khasi Hills
- Lok Sabha constituency: Shillong
- Established: 2003
- Total electors: 29,932
- Reservation: ST

Member of Legislative Assembly
- 11th Meghalaya Legislative Assembly
- Incumbent Gavin Miguel Mylliem
- Party: NPP
- Alliance: NDA
- Elected year: 2023

Sohra is one of the 60 Legislative Assembly constituencies of Meghalaya state in India.

It is part of East Khasi Hills district and is reserved for candidates belonging to the Scheduled Tribes.

== Members of the Legislative Assembly ==
Election	Member	Party
1972	S. Phaindrojen Swer	All Party Hill Leaders Conference
1978	Phaindrojen Swer	All Party Hill Leaders Conference
1983	Dr. Flinder Anderson Khonglam	Hill State People's Democratic Party
1988	S. Phaindrojen Swer	Hill People's Union
1993	Dr. Flinder Anderson Khonglam	Independent politician
1998	Dr. Flinder Anderson Khonglam	Independent politician
2003	Dr. Flinder Anderson Khonglam	Hill State People's Democratic Party
2008	Dr. Phlour W. Khongjee	Indian National Congress
2013	Titosstarwell Chyne	United Democratic Party
2018	Gavin Miguel Mylliem	People's Democratic Front
2023	Gavin Miguel Mylliem	National People's Party

== Election results ==
=== Assembly Election 2023 ===
2023 Meghalaya Legislative Assembly election: Sohra
Party	Candidate	Votes	%	±%
PDF	Gavin Miguel Mylliem	11,358	42.50%	▲4.87
UDP	Titosstar Well Chyne	11,343	42.45%	▲13.65
NPP	Alan West Kharkongor	1,598	5.98%	New
AITC	Harold Firming Khongsit	1,137	4.25%	New
VPP	G. Phaiyolin Nongrum	916	3.43%	New
INC	Lakyntiew Sohkhlet	229	0.86%	▼17.00
NOTA	None of the Above	124	0.46%	▲0.01
Margin of victory		15	0.06%	▼8.77
Turnout		26,723	89.28%	▼1.32
Registered electors		29,932		▲18.32
PDF hold		Swing	▲4.87	

=== Assembly Election 2018 ===
2018 Meghalaya Legislative Assembly election: Sohra
Party	Candidate	Votes	%	±%
PDF	Gavin Miguel Mylliem	8,625	37.63%	New
UDP	Titosstar Well Chyne	6,601	28.80%	▼19.04
INC	Donevan Wanlang	4,092	17.85%	▼18.19
BJP	Phlour W.Khongjee	1,838	8.02%	New
HSPDP	Droistar Khongsti	1,329	5.80%	▲4.60
Independent	Mattsing Nongrum	121	0.53%	New
NOTA	None of the Above	104	0.45%	New
Margin of victory		2,024	8.83%	▼2.96
Turnout		22,919	90.60%	▲1.08
Registered electors		25,297		▲23.29
PDF gain from UDP		Swing	▼10.21	

=== Assembly Election 2013 ===
2013 Meghalaya Legislative Assembly election: Sohra
Party	Candidate	Votes	%	±%
UDP	Titosstarwell Chyne	8,787	47.84%	▲21.38
INC	Dr. Phlour W. Khongjee	6,621	36.05%	▲6.55
Independent	S. Donskobar Mylliem	2,514	13.69%	New
CPI	Richard D. Shabong	226	1.23%	New
HSPDP	Mattsing Nongrum	220	1.20%	▼24.08
Margin of victory		2,166	11.79%	▲8.75
Turnout		18,368	89.52%	▼1.48
Registered electors		20,519		▲20.28
UDP gain from INC		Swing	▲18.34	

=== Assembly Election 2008 ===
2008 Meghalaya Legislative Assembly election: Sohra
Party	Candidate	Votes	%	±%
INC	Dr. Phlour W. Khongjee	4,579	29.50%	▲4.34
UDP	Titosstar Well Chyne	4,107	26.46%	▼1.33
HSPDP	Dr. Flinder Anderson Khonglam	3,924	25.28%	▼6.89
KHNAM	Donevan Wanlang	2,468	15.90%	▲2.21
MDP	Kodin Nongrum	241	1.55%	New
Independent	Mattsing Nongrum	205	1.32%	New
Margin of victory		472	3.04%	▼1.34
Turnout		15,524	91.00%	▲20.43
Registered electors		17,059		▼5.39
INC gain from HSPDP		Swing	▼2.67	

=== Assembly Election 2003 ===
2003 Meghalaya Legislative Assembly election: Sohra
Party	Candidate	Votes	%	±%
HSPDP	Dr. Flinder Anderson Khonglam	4,093	32.17%	New
UDP	Phlour W. Khongjee	3,536	27.79%	▲14.01
INC	Walter David Lyngwi	3,201	25.16%	▼3.47
KHNAM	Wanstep Diengdoh	1,742	13.69%	New
NCP	Kodin Nongrum	153	1.20%	New
Margin of victory		557	4.38%	▼5.76
Turnout		12,725	70.62%	▲2.83
Registered electors		18,031		▲12.17
HSPDP gain from Independent		Swing	▼6.60	

=== Assembly Election 1998 ===
1998 Meghalaya Legislative Assembly election: Sohra
Party	Candidate	Votes	%	±%
Independent	Dr. Flinder Anderson Khonglam	4,221	38.76%	New
INC	Walter David Lyngwi	3,117	28.63%	▲3.23
PDM	Simil Gury Kharhujon	2,051	18.84%	New
UDP	S. Phaindrojen Swer	1,500	13.78%	New
Margin of victory		1,104	10.14%	▼0.60
Turnout		10,889	69.43%	▼7.36
Registered electors		16,074		▲1.93
Independent hold		Swing	▼1.18	

=== Assembly Election 1993 ===
1993 Meghalaya Legislative Assembly election: Sohra
Party	Candidate	Votes	%	±%
Independent	Dr. Flinder Anderson Khonglam	4,731	39.95%	New
HPU	S. Phaindrojen Swer	3,459	29.21%	▼19.10
INC	Walter David Lyngwi	3,008	25.40%	▼16.09
Janata Dal (B)	Dralnor Nongrum	291	2.46%	New
AHL(AM)	Remington Marbaniang	239	2.02%	New
Independent	W. Matthew Mawdkhap	115	0.97%	New
Margin of victory		1,272	10.74%	▲3.92
Turnout		11,843	76.26%	▼0.58
Registered electors		15,769		▲25.31
Independent gain from HPU		Swing	▼8.36	

=== Assembly Election 1988 ===
1988 Meghalaya Legislative Assembly election: Sohra
Party	Candidate	Votes	%	±%
HPU	S. Phaindrojen Swer	4,601	48.31%	New
INC	Dr. Flinder Anderson Khonglam	3,951	41.48%	▲23.76
Independent	D. Isco Swer	614	6.45%	New
Independent	Remington Marbaniang	204	2.14%	New
HSPDP	Moti Lal Diengdoh	81	0.85%	▼39.04
PDC	Gaulstan Mayar Diengdoh	73	0.77%	▼4.29
Margin of victory		650	6.82%	▲4.26
Turnout		9,524	77.03%	▲5.95
Registered electors		12,584		▲12.64
HPU gain from HSPDP		Swing	▲8.42	

=== Assembly Election 1983 ===
1983 Meghalaya Legislative Assembly election: Sohra
Party	Candidate	Votes	%	±%
HSPDP	Dr. Flinder Anderson Khonglam	3,108	39.89%	▲9.40
APHLC	S. Phaindrojen Swer	2,908	37.33%	▼3.79
INC	W. Matthews Singh Mawdkhap	1,381	17.73%	▼3.66
PDC	Remington Marbaniang	394	5.06%	New
Margin of victory		200	2.57%	▼8.05
Turnout		7,791	72.74%	▲0.97
Registered electors		11,172		▲9.37
HSPDP gain from APHLC		Swing	▼1.22	

=== Assembly Election 1978 ===
1978 Meghalaya Legislative Assembly election: Sohra
Party	Candidate	Votes	%	±%
APHLC	Phaindrojen Swer	2,888	41.11%	▼7.95
HSPDP	Dr. Flinder Anderson Khonglam	2,142	30.49%	New
INC	Michael Giri	1,502	21.38%	New
Independent	L. Morrow Mohon Kharpuri	493	7.02%	New
Margin of victory		746	10.62%	▲3.29
Turnout		7,025	69.84%	▲7.35
Registered electors		10,215		▲39.26
APHLC hold		Swing	▼7.95	

=== Assembly Election 1972 ===
1972 Meghalaya Legislative Assembly election: Sohra
Party	Candidate	Votes	%	±%
APHLC	S. Phaindrojen Swer	2,210	49.06%	New
Independent	A Blingstodar Diengdoh	1,880	41.73%	New
Independent	Lumkur Diengdoh	415	9.21%	New
Margin of victory		330	7.33%	
Turnout		4,505	63.31%	
Registered electors		7,335		
APHLC win (new seat)				

== See also ==
- List of constituencies of the Meghalaya Legislative Assembly
- East Khasi Hills district
