= J. D. Rymbai =

Indian politician (1934–2022)

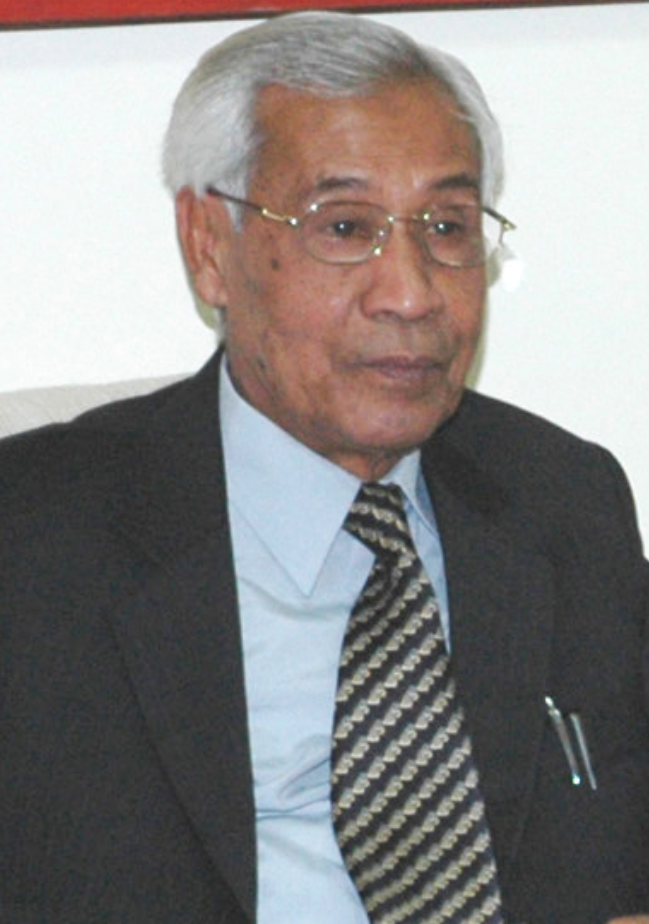

9th Chief Minister of Meghalaya
- In office 15 June 2006 – 10 March 2007
- Governor: M. M. Jacob
- Preceded by: D. D. Lapang
- Succeeded by: D. D. Lapang
- Constituency: Jirang

Personal details
- Born: J. Dringwell Rymbai; 26 October 1934 Meghalaya, British Raj
- Died: 21 April 2022 (aged 87)
- Party: United Democratic Party
- Spouse: Peggymon Pathaw
- Children: 5
- As of 18 June, 2006 Source: Government of Meghalaya

J. Dringwell Rymbai (26 October 1934 – 21 April 2022) was a politician from Meghalaya, India.

== Life ==
Born in a poor family, he had to drop out of his graduate education. He became an assistant teacher in a government school. He later obtained a graduate degree as well as a degree in education (B. Ed. - Bachelor of education). He went on to become the head master in a government school.

He entered active politics in 1983 and contested elections to the legislative assembly of Meghalaya on the Congress party ticket from the Jirang constituency. He was made the deputy speaker of the legislative assembly in the same year. He was re-elected as MLA of Jirang three times consecutively in 1993, 1998 and 2003. In 1993, he was elected the speaker of the Meghalaya Assembly. Since 1998, he has held charge of several ministries in the government.

He was regarded as a loyalist Chief Minister D. D. Lapang. After conflict over Lapang's leadership in 2006, he replaced Lapang as the Chief Minister of Meghalaya on 15 June 2006.

He served as chief minister until March 2007, when Lapang returned to office following a decision by the Congress Party. He was married to Peggymon Pathaw and had five children, three daughters and two sons. J.D. Rymbai resigned from the Assembly and the Indian National Congress on 4 January 2008.

Rymbai died on 21 April 2022, aged 88.
