= E. K. Mawlong =

Indian politician

Evansius Kek Mawlong

7th Chief Minister of Meghalaya
- In office 8 March 2000 – 8 December 2001
- Governor: M. M. Jacob
- Preceded by: B. B. Lyngdoh
- Succeeded by: Flinder Anderson Khonglam

Personal details
- Born: 1 February 1946 Mawmih Village, East Khasi Hills district, Bengal Presidency, British India
- Died: 18 October 2008 (aged 62) Shillong, Meghalaya, India
- Resting place: Mawprem Catholic Cemetery, Shillong
- Party: United Democratic Party
- Spouse: Angelina Riazida Lyngdoh
- Children: 6
- Education: St. Anthony's College, Shillong

Evansius Kek Mawlong (1 February 1946 – 18 October 2008) was an Indian politician who served as the Chief Minister of Meghalaya from 8 March 2000, until 8 December 2001. He was the main architect and founding president of the United Democratic Party in Meghalaya.

== Early life ==
E.K. Mawlong was born on 1 February 1946, in Mawmih village, East Khasi Hills District, in present-day Meghalaya. He earned his Bachelor of Science from St. Anthony's College, Shillong in 1969. Mawlong then began his professional career as a teacher in St. Dominic Savio High School, Shillong, working from 1968 until June 1971. He also worked for the state Accountant General's office.

== Career ==
=== Political career ===
Mawlong's political career began in 1972, when he was elected to the Khasi Hills Autonomous District Council as an independent. He joined the Indian National Congress party in 1975, serving as the President of the Meghalaya Pradesh Youth Congress and a member of the national Indian Youth Congress, the youth wing of the Congress Party.

Mawlong was first elected to the Meghalaya Legislative Assembly in 1978 as an independent representing the Umroi constituency. He was appointed Minister of State in the then regional coalition known as the Three Flag Government, which lasted only for three months. He was re-elected from the Umroi seat in 1983, 1988 and 1993 state legislative elections as a member of the Hill State People's Democratic Party (HSPDP). He also served as the General Secretary of the HSPDP during this period until September 1997. He briefly served as a cabinet minister from 1990 to 1991 within Meghalaya Chief Minister B.B. Lyngdoh's administration in the MUPP coalition Government.

Mawlong left the HSPDP in September 1997 and was the founder and main architect in the formation of the United Democratic Party (UDP). He was elected as the founding President of the UDP on 11 September 1997 and served as the party's leader until 2004. Under his leadership, the UDP emerged victorious with 20 seats in the 1998 Assembly General Elections, which was the largest number mustered by any regional party after the dissolution of the All People Hill's Leaders Conference (APHLC). He was re-elected to the Meghalaya Legislative Assembly in 1998 as a UDP candidate, earning a fifth consecutive term in the assembly.

He also served as the Speaker of the Meghalaya Legislative Assembly from 1983 to 1988, and again from 1998 to 7 March 2000. Mawlong was known for strictly maintaining the dignity and decorum of the House. His rulings in the Assembly are highly revered and are referred to often by the other Meghalaya Speakers.

=== Chief Minister of Meghalaya ===
Mawlong became the Chief Minister of Meghalaya on 8 March 2000. He was unanimously elected by the Legislature Party to replace then incumbent and fellow party member, B. B. Lyngdoh. His 18-month tenure was embroiled in a scandal stemming from the construction of Meghalaya House in Kolkata. Two allied political parties, the Bharatiya Janata Party (BJP) and Nationalist Congress Party (NCP), withdrew their support for Mawlong and he was forced to step down from office on 8 December 2001. He was succeeded by Flinder Anderson Khonglam.

Mawlong was defeated in the Assembly General Election in 2003 by Stanlywiss Rymbai of the Congress Party. The fallout from the Meghalaya House was seen as the key factor in the loss of his seat. Facing huge pressure especially from the Khasi Students' Union and the People's Rally Against Corruption (PRAC), Mawlong cancelled the agreement with the then Asian Housing Corporation Limited (AHCL). However, after his resignation as Chief Minister, the subsequent Government allotted the construction to the same company (AHCL) at four times the initial cost. To clear his name from the corruption allegations, Mawlong filed a Writ Petition in the Shillong Bench of the Gauhati High Court.

On 28 January 2008, the Guwahati High Court cleared Mawlong of wrongdoing in the Meghalaya House scandal. In its ruling, the court ordered the Meghalaya state government not to pursue charges against Mawlong in the case.

However, Mawlong ran for his old Umroi constituency in Ri Bhoi district in the February 2008 legislative election. He defeated incumbent Congress Party MLA Stanlywiss Rymbai, the same person who had ousted Mawlong from office in the 2003 election.

His health began to decline rapidly following the 2008 election. Mawlong died at Shillong Civil Hospital on 18 October 2008, at the age of 62. Mawlong was offered a state funeral by the Government of Meghalaya but his family declined it. This was the first ever case of a former Chief Minister in independent India being laid to rest without State honors. He was given a simple burial, amidst presence of thousands of well wishers, in Mawprem Catholic cemetery. A resident of Shillong, he was survived by his wife, four sons and two daughters.

=== Contribution ===
Mawlong was well known for his unique vision, integrity, easy access, humility and patience which earned him the affection of his friends, well wishers and supporters. His long tenure as the representative of Umroi was entirely due to his effort in bringing huge infrastructural, medical and developmental activities in his constituency. He took keen interest towards the economic growth of his constituency and of the State.

During his tenure as Chief Minister, he had taken huge efforts to settle the long pending boundary dispute between Assam and Meghalaya along with his Assam counterpart, Prafulla Kumar Mahanta. He took unique initiatives negotiating with the Ministry of Defence in obtaining underutilized defence plots for the construction of public parking lots in Garikhana, Khlieh Iewduh and Upper Mawprem areas to ease traffic congestion in Shillong City. He also took initiatives to kickstart the processes for construction of the National Highway Shillong By Pass, Myntdu-Leshka Hydel Project and the North Eastern Indira Gandhi Regional Institute of Medical Sciences.

As Minister in charge of the Law Department in 1990 to 1991 he mooted the idea of creating a separate High Court for Meghalaya. He fervently followed up this initiation as Chief Minister with Arun Jaitley the then Union Law Minister. The Meghalaya High Court was finally inaugurated in 2013. His pet project as Chief Minister was the road linkage from Lad Umroi and Mawlasnai to Diphu in Assam with financial assistance from the North Eastern Council, which gave a lifeline to the people living in the disputed Block II area.

As Minister in charge of the General Administration Department (GAD) from 1990 to 1991, he met the then Chief Minister of West Bengal, Jyoti Basu, to seek a plot of land in Kolkata for construction of the second Meghalaya House. Basu introduced him to Buddhadeb Bhattarcharya and Meghalaya was allotted a plot of land in Shantipally, East Kolkata near Rash Behari Area, where the second Meghalaya House now stands. However, when his Government took steps to construct a new building to replace the dilapidated Meghalaya House in Russell Street, Kolkata he was accused of corruption and due to massive political and social turmoil, he had to step down as Chief Minister.

As Speaker of the Meghalaya Legislative Assembly from 1983 to 1988, he met the then Deputy Chairman of the Planning Commission, Dr. Manmohan Singh seeking financial assistance for the setting up of the Meghalaya Legislative Assembly printing press. After thorough deliberations, Dr. Manmohan Singh sanctioned the funds required for the setting up of the printing press. The press serves till this day for printing numerous documents required by the Meghalaya Assembly Secretariat. It was during his tenure as Speaker, that Meghalaya hosted the SAARC Ministerial Meet in Shillong in 1986 which was a huge success. The Prime Minister of India, Rajiv Gandhi inaugurated the session.

=== Other activities ===
E.K. Mawlong was the longest serving President of the Catholic Association in the Khasi Jaiñtia Hills of Meghalaya. He had served the Catholic Association for 17 years till the year 2005 when he voluntarily gave up the post for health reasons. His effort in arranging the visit of Pope John Paul II to Shillong, is fondly remembered. He stayed in New Delhi for two long weeks in order to convince the Ministry of Home Affairs to clear the Papal visit. After a hard-fought debate with its officials, Mawlong convinced the Ministry of Home Affairs to allow the Pope to visit Shillong. Pope John Paul II was allowed to visit Shillong on 4 February 1986 for only three hours due to security concerns.

Mawlong was also the President of the Meghalaya Cooperative Apex Bank Employees Union for 25 years. He had held the post till his demise in 2008.

== Personal life ==
E.K. Mawlong married Angelina Riazida Lyngdoh in 1978. They had four sons and two daughters.

== Awards ==
- National Citizen's Award in the year 2001
- Best Citizen of India awarded by the International Publishing House, New Delhi in the year 2000
- Manav Sewa Purashkar awarded by the Institute of Economic Studies in the year 1998
- Bharat Jyoti Award in the year 2008
