= Darwin Diengdoh Pugh =

Indian politician

2nd Chief Minister of Meghalaya
- In office 10 March 1978 – 6 May 1979
- Governor: Lallan Prasad Singh
- Preceded by: Williamson A. Sangma
- Succeeded by: B. B. Lyngdoh

Personal details
- Born: 12 January 1927 Sohra, British India
- Died: 17 November 2008 (aged 81)
- Party: All Party Hill Leaders Conference
- Education: Gauhati University

Darwin Diengdoh Pugh (12 January 1927 – 17 November 2008) was the second Chief Minister of the state of Meghalaya in north-eastern India and the first Khasi person to hold the position. He was the general secretary of the All Party Hill Leaders Conference (APHLC).

== Career ==
Born on 12 January 1927 in Sohra to the late Bransly Marpna Pugh and Glis Diengdoh, Pugh graduated from Gauhati University. He began his professional career in the Navy during the Second World War. He also served as the Headmaster of the Nisangram School in Garo Hills and Cherra Presbyterian Proceeding High School in Nongsawlia, Sohra. Pugh joined active politics in the early 1960s and was elected as member of the Khasi Hills Autonomous District Council in 1967, serving until 1972. In 1972, he was elected on the APHLC ticket from Nongskhen constituency, bordering Bangladesh and subsequently made his maiden entry to the first state Assembly.
