= S. C. Marak =

Indian politician (1941–2024)

Salseng C Marak

6th Chief Minister of Meghalaya
- In office 19 February 1993 – 10 March 1998
- Governor: Madhukar Dighe; M. M. Jacob
- Preceded by: D. D. Lapang
- Succeeded by: B. B. Lyngdoh

Personal details
- Born: 16 January 1941 Baghmara, Assam Province, British India
- Died: 16 August 2024 (aged 83) Tura, Meghalaya, India
- Party: Indian National Congress
- Education: Scottish Church College
- Occupation: Politician

Salseng Chada Marak (16 January 1941 – 16 August 2024) was an Indian politician who was a senior leader of the Indian National Congress in the northeastern state of Meghalaya.

Born on 16 January 1941, he attended Kolkata's Scottish Church College. Marak was a Chief Minister of the state from 1993 to 1998. He died on 16 August 2024, at the age of 83.
