= Admiral K. Sangma =

Indian politician (died 2020)

Admiral K. Sangma (1956/1957 – 1 February 2020) was an Indian politician and member of the Nationalist Congress Party. Sangma was a member of the Meghalaya Legislative Assembly from the Dalamgiri constituency in West Garo Hills district as an Indian National Congress candidate in 1993 and 1998.
