= Langkyrdem Assembly constituency =

Constituency of the Meghalaya legislative assembly in India

Langkyrdem
- Former constituency for the Meghalaya Legislative Assembly

Constituency details
- Country: India
- Region: Northeast India
- State: Meghalaya
- Established: 1972
- Abolished: 2013
- Total electors: 19,435

Langkyrdem Assembly constituency was an assembly constituency in the Indian state of Meghalaya.

== Members of the Legislative Assembly ==
Election	Member	Party
1972	Galynstone Laloo	All Party Hill Leaders Conference
1978	Brington Buhai Lyngdoh	All Party Hill Leaders Conference
1983	Brington Buhai Lyngdoh	All Party Hill Leaders Conference
1988	Brington Buhai Lyngdoh	Hill People's Union
1993	Brington Buhai Lyngdoh	Hill People's Union
1998	Brington Buhai Lyngdoh	United Democratic Party
2003	Prestone Tynsong	Indian National Congress
2008	Prestone Tynsong	Indian National Congress

== Election results ==
=== Assembly Election 2008 ===
2008 Meghalaya Legislative Assembly election: Langkyrdem
Party	Candidate	Votes	%	±%
INC	Prestone Tynsong	7,356	41.87%	▲20.39
KHNAM	Dominic Roblin Nongkynrih	6,553	37.30%	New
UDP	Samuel Khongbuh Massar	3,541	20.16%	▲8.00
LJP	Christina Majaw	118	0.67%	New
Margin of victory		803	4.57%	▲1.41
Turnout		17,568	90.39%	▲25.12
Registered electors		19,435		▼3.75
INC hold		Swing	▲20.39	

=== Assembly Election 2003 ===
2003 Meghalaya Legislative Assembly election: Langkyrdem
Party	Candidate	Votes	%	±%
INC	Prestone Tynsong	2,832	21.49%	▼12.85
MDP	Syrpai Khonglah	2,415	18.32%	New
Khasi Farmers Democratic Party	Dominic Roblin Nongkynrih	1,857	14.09%	New
UDP	Richardstone Jana Nongbet	1,602	12.15%	▼29.14
Independent	Samuel Khongbuh Massar	1,552	11.77%	New
NCP	Khlur Sing Lyngdoh	769	5.83%	New
HSPDP	Horen Nongsteng	643	4.88%	New
Margin of victory		417	3.16%	▼3.80
Turnout		13,181	65.28%	▲3.47
Registered electors		20,192		▲6.43
INC gain from UDP		Swing	▼19.81	

=== Assembly Election 1998 ===
1998 Meghalaya Legislative Assembly election: Langkyrdem
Party	Candidate	Votes	%	±%
UDP	Brington Buhai Lyngdoh	4,843	41.30%	New
INC	Youngstenshon Tynsong	4,026	34.33%	▼5.15
Hindu Samaj Party	Khlur Sing Lyngdoh	2,777	23.68%	New
RJD	Sataw Tynsong	81	0.69%	New
Margin of victory		817	6.97%	▼14.07
Turnout		11,727	63.71%	▼9.61
Registered electors		18,972		▲2.65
UDP gain from HPU		Swing	▼19.22	

=== Assembly Election 1993 ===
1993 Meghalaya Legislative Assembly election: Langkyrdem
Party	Candidate	Votes	%	±%
HPU	Brington Buhai Lyngdoh	7,989	60.52%	▲3.85
INC	Dominic Roblin Nongkynrih	5,212	39.48%	▲2.52
Margin of victory		2,777	21.04%	▲1.33
Turnout		13,201	73.13%	▼0.33
Registered electors		18,483		▲23.20
HPU hold		Swing		

=== Assembly Election 1988 ===
1988 Meghalaya Legislative Assembly election: Langkyrdem
Party	Candidate	Votes	%	±%
HPU	Brington Buhai Lyngdoh	6,100	56.67%	New
INC	Denis Ryngjah	3,979	36.96%	▲33.36
PDC	S. A. Nongrum	686	6.37%	▼24.10
Margin of victory		2,121	19.70%	▲13.10
Turnout		10,765	73.94%	▲3.91
Registered electors		15,002		▲22.88
HPU gain from APHLC		Swing		

=== Assembly Election 1983 ===
1983 Meghalaya Legislative Assembly election: Langkyrdem
Party	Candidate	Votes	%	±%
APHLC	Brington Buhai Lyngdoh	3,071	37.08%	▲0.65
PDC	Denis Rynjah	2,524	30.47%	New
HSPDP	Tarson Rynjah	2,390	28.85%	▲10.83
INC	Aloysius Wilford Binan	298	3.60%	▼26.09
Margin of victory		547	6.60%	▼0.13
Turnout		8,283	70.10%	▲1.68
Registered electors		12,209		▲13.57
APHLC hold		Swing	▲0.65	

=== Assembly Election 1978 ===
1978 Meghalaya Legislative Assembly election: Langkyrdem
Party	Candidate	Votes	%	±%
APHLC	Brington Buhai Lyngdoh	2,591	36.43%	▼5.89
INC	Tarson Rynjah	2,112	29.69%	New
HSPDP	O. Peline Lytand	1,282	18.02%	New
Independent	Benington Shabong	1,128	15.86%	New
Margin of victory		479	6.73%	▲3.37
Turnout		7,113	67.77%	▲21.34
Registered electors		10,750		▲46.08
APHLC hold		Swing	▼5.89	

=== Assembly Election 1972 ===
1972 Meghalaya Legislative Assembly election: Langkyrdem
Party	Candidate	Votes	%	±%
APHLC	Galynstone Laloo	1,396	42.32%	New
Independent	Herington Mulliem	1,285	38.95%	New
Independent	Pila Khongkliam	618	18.73%	New
Margin of victory		111	3.36%	
Turnout		3,299	45.66%	
Registered electors		7,359		
APHLC win (new seat)				
