= Rongchugiri Assembly constituency =

Former assembly constituency in Meghalaya, India

Coordinates: 25.58°N 90.29°E

Rongchugiri
- Former constituency No. 47 for the Meghalaya Legislative Assembly

Constituency details
- Country: India
- Region: Northeast India
- State: Meghalaya
- District: West Garo Hills
- Lok Sabha constituency: Tura
- Established: 1972
- Abolished: 2008
- Total electors: 14,736 (2008)
- Reservation: ST

Rongchugiri was one of the 60 assembly constituencies of Meghalaya a north east state of India. Rongchugiri was also part of Tura (Lok Sabha constituency). It held its last election in 2008.

== Members of the Legislative Assembly ==
Election	Member	Party
1972	Medison A. Sangma	All Party Hill Leaders Conference
1978	M. Reidson Momin	Indian National Congress
1983	William Cecil Marak	All Party Hill Leaders Conference
1988	Sherjee M. Sangma	Hill People's Union
1993	Backstar Sangma	Independent politician
1998	Beckstar Sangma	Indian National Congress
2003	Beckstar Sangma	Nationalist Congress Party
2008	James Sangma	Nationalist Congress Party

== Election results ==
=== Assembly Election 2008 ===
2008 Meghalaya Legislative Assembly election: Rongchugiri
Party	Candidate	Votes	%	±%
NCP	James Pangsang Kongkal Sangma	5,877	41.82%	▲15.70
INC	Beckster Sangma	4,439	31.59%	▲15.02
Independent	Rakkan M.Sangma	1,873	13.33%	New
UDP	Sengnang R.Marak	819	5.83%	▼12.59
GNC	Paul B.Marak	572	4.07%	New
Independent	Septerwin R.Sangma	472	3.36%	New
Margin of victory		1,438	10.23%	▲7.93
Turnout		14,052	95.36%	▲12.92
Registered electors		14,736		▲0.12
NCP hold		Swing	▲15.70	

=== Assembly Election 2003 ===
2003 Meghalaya Legislative Assembly election: Rongchugiri
Party	Candidate	Votes	%	±%
NCP	Beckstar Sangma	3,170	26.12%	New
Independent	Chanang K Marak	2,891	23.83%	New
UDP	Sherjee M. Sangma	2,235	18.42%	▲11.49
INC	Paul B. Marak	2,011	16.57%	▼29.23
Independent	Roynath Sangma	1,471	12.12%	New
BJP	Tretiarson Marak	356	2.93%	▼0.76
Margin of victory		279	2.30%	▼16.64
Turnout		12,134	82.44%	▲3.22
Registered electors		14,718		▲10.33
NCP gain from INC		Swing	▼19.68	

=== Assembly Election 1998 ===
1998 Meghalaya Legislative Assembly election: Rongchugiri
Party	Candidate	Votes	%	±%
INC	Beckstar Sangma	4,841	45.80%	▲16.09
Independent	Sherjee M. Sangma	2,839	26.86%	New
Independent	Benedict Marak	1,010	9.56%	New
GNC	William Cecil Marak	757	7.16%	New
UDP	Rockefeller Momin	732	6.93%	New
BJP	Cliford Areng	390	3.69%	New
Margin of victory		2,002	18.94%	▼18.11
Turnout		10,569	82.17%	▼5.74
Registered electors		13,340		▲11.19
INC gain from Independent		Swing	▼20.97	

=== Assembly Election 1993 ===
1993 Meghalaya Legislative Assembly election: Rongchugiri
Party	Candidate	Votes	%	±%
Independent	Backstar Sangma	6,806	66.77%	New
INC	Sherjee H. Sangma	3,029	29.72%	▲1.63
HPU	Probash Sangha	358	3.51%	▼42.75
Margin of victory		3,777	37.05%	▲18.88
Turnout		10,193	87.42%	▲8.35
Registered electors		11,997		▲14.33
Independent gain from HPU		Swing		

=== Assembly Election 1988 ===
1988 Meghalaya Legislative Assembly election: Rongchugiri
Party	Candidate	Votes	%	±%
HPU	Sherjee M. Sangma	3,719	46.26%	New
INC	William Cecil Marak	2,258	28.09%	▼7.05
Margin of victory		1,461	18.17%	▲2.18
Turnout		8,039	80.48%	▲16.10
Registered electors		10,493		▲26.18
HPU gain from APHLC		Swing		

=== Assembly Election 1983 ===
1983 Meghalaya Legislative Assembly election: Rongchugiri
Party	Candidate	Votes	%	±%
APHLC	William Cecil Marak	2,573	51.13%	▲20.64
INC	M. Reidson Momin	1,768	35.14%	▼2.22
HSPDP	Jonathon Sangma	691	13.73%	New
Margin of victory		805	16.00%	▲9.14
Turnout		5,032	63.59%	▲21.43
Registered electors		8,316		▲9.28
APHLC gain from INC		Swing		

=== Assembly Election 1978 ===
1978 Meghalaya Legislative Assembly election: Rongchugiri
Party	Candidate	Votes	%	±%
INC	M. Reidson Momin	1,111	37.36%	New
APHLC	Jackson Marak	907	30.50%	▼23.03
Independent	Levison Marak	670	22.53%	New
Independent	Arthur Momin	286	9.62%	New
Margin of victory		204	6.86%	▼22.36
Turnout		2,974	43.67%	▲14.35
Registered electors		7,610		▲38.16
INC gain from APHLC		Swing	▼16.17	

=== Assembly Election 1972 ===
1972 Meghalaya Legislative Assembly election: Rongchugiri
Party	Candidate	Votes	%	±%
APHLC	Medison A. Sangma	729	53.52%	New
Independent	Arthur Momin	331	24.30%	New
Independent	Arobinda Sangma	302	22.17%	New
Margin of victory		398	29.22%	
Turnout		1,362	27.12%	
Registered electors		5,508		
APHLC win (new seat)				

== See also ==
- Rongchugiri
- West Garo Hills district
- Tura (Lok Sabha constituency)
