= Madhukar Dighe =

Indian politician (1920–2014)

Governor of Meghalaya
- In office 9 May 1990 – 8 June 1995
- Preceded by: Abubakar Abdul Rahim
- Succeeded by: M. M. Jacob

Personal details
- Born: 26 October 1920
- Died: 28 July 2014 (aged 93)

Madhukar Dighe (26 October 1920 – 28 July 2014) was an Indian politician who was the governor of Meghalaya from 10 May 1990 to 18 June 1995. Dighe was also the governor of Arunachal Pradesh in 1993, as an additional charge, and was earlier a cabinet minister in the Ram Naresh Yadav ministry from 1977 to 1979.
