= Dalamgiri Assembly constituency =

Former assembly constituency in Meghalaya, India

Coordinates: 25.279°N 90.114°E

Dalamgiri
- Former constituency No. 56 for the Meghalaya Legislative Assembly

Constituency details
- Country: India
- Region: Northeast India
- State: Meghalaya
- District: West Garo Hills
- Lok Sabha constituency: Tura
- Established: 1972
- Abolished: 2008
- Total electors: 15,467 (2008)
- Reservation: ST

Dalamgiri was one of the 60 assembly constituencies of Meghalaya, a north-east state of India. It was also part of Tura (Lok Sabha constituency). Dalamgiri was made defunct by the Delimitation of Parliamentary and Assembly Constituencies Order, 2008.

== Members of the Legislative Assembly ==
Election	Member	Party
1972	Ira Marak	All Party Hill Leaders Conference
1978	Armison Marak	All Party Hill Leaders Conference
1983	Ira Marak	Indian National Congress
1988	Ira Marak	Indian National Congress
1993	Admiral K. Sangma	Indian National Congress
1998	Admiral K. Sangma	Indian National Congress
2003	Admiral K. Sangma	Nationalist Congress Party
2008	Saleng Sangma	Indian National Congress

== Election results ==
=== Assembly Election 2008 ===
2008 Meghalaya Legislative Assembly election: Dalamgiri
Party	Candidate	Votes	%	±%
INC	Saleng Sangma	6,900	47.30%	▲14.44
NCP	Admiral K. Sangma	5,786	39.66%	▼6.36
Independent	Sanjiv R. Marak	804	5.51%	New
UDP	Utpal Arengh	580	3.98%	New
GNC	Nipinson Momin	216	1.48%	▼19.64
BJP	Ethilson Ch. Sangma	175	1.20%	New
Independent	Blan Clever Sangma	128	0.88%	New
Margin of victory		1,114	7.64%	▼5.53
Turnout		14,589	94.32%	▲15.67
Registered electors		15,467		▼0.50
INC gain from NCP		Swing	▲1.27	

=== Assembly Election 2003 ===
2003 Meghalaya Legislative Assembly election: Dalamgiri
Party	Candidate	Votes	%	±%
NCP	Admiral K. Sangma	5,627	46.02%	New
INC	Ira Marak	4,017	32.85%	▼9.01
GNC	Widnald Marak	2,583	21.13%	▲15.83
Margin of victory		1,610	13.17%	▲8.13
Turnout		12,227	78.66%	▲2.27
Registered electors		15,545		▲7.63
NCP gain from INC		Swing	▲4.16	

=== Assembly Election 1998 ===
1998 Meghalaya Legislative Assembly election: Dalamgiri
Party	Candidate	Votes	%	±%
INC	Admiral K. Sangma	4,618	41.86%	▲6.01
Independent	Semford Sangma	4,062	36.82%	New
Independent	Marcell Marak	943	8.55%	New
UDP	Septen Marak	825	7.48%	New
GNC	Anil Momin	584	5.29%	New
Margin of victory		556	5.04%	▲4.26
Turnout		11,032	80.11%	▼5.86
Registered electors		14,443		▲13.62
INC hold		Swing	▲6.01	

=== Assembly Election 1993 ===
1993 Meghalaya Legislative Assembly election: Dalamgiri
Party	Candidate	Votes	%	±%
INC	Admiral K. Sangma	3,748	35.85%	▼9.26
Independent	Semford Sangma	3,666	35.06%	New
AHL(AM)	Armison Marka	2,141	20.48%	New
HPU	Greenson Marak	543	5.19%	▼3.34
BJP	Blan Clever Sangma	357	3.41%	New
Margin of victory		82	0.78%	▼35.79
Turnout		10,455	84.89%	▲4.18
Registered electors		12,712		▲17.64
INC hold		Swing	▼9.26	

=== Assembly Election 1988 ===
1988 Meghalaya Legislative Assembly election: Dalamgiri
Party	Candidate	Votes	%	±%
INC	Ira Marak	3,805	45.10%	▼12.74
HPU	Binsing Marak	720	8.53%	New
Margin of victory		3,085	36.57%	▲20.88
Turnout		8,436	81.08%	▲3.45
Registered electors		10,806		▲14.06
INC hold		Swing		

=== Assembly Election 1983 ===
1983 Meghalaya Legislative Assembly election: Dalamgiri
Party	Candidate	Votes	%	±%
INC	Ira Marak	4,089	57.84%	▲13.85
APHLC	Armison Marak	2,980	42.16%	▼13.85
Margin of victory		1,109	15.69%	▲3.68
Turnout		7,069	80.46%	▲11.28
Registered electors		9,474		▲15.09
INC gain from APHLC		Swing		

=== Assembly Election 1978 ===
1978 Meghalaya Legislative Assembly election: Dalamgiri
Party	Candidate	Votes	%	±%
APHLC	Armison Marak	2,920	56.00%	▼44.00
INC	Ira Marak	2,294	44.00%	New
Margin of victory		626	12.01%	
Turnout		5,214	68.46%	▼36.66
Registered electors		8,232		▲38.80
APHLC hold		Swing		

=== Assembly Election 1972 ===
1972 Meghalaya Legislative Assembly election: Dalamgiri
Party	Candidate	Votes	%	±%
APHLC	Ira Marak	Unopposed		
Registered electors		5,931		
APHLC win (new seat)				

== See also ==
- West Garo Hills district
- Tura (Lok Sabha constituency)
