= All Party Hill Leaders Conference =

- Abbreviation: APHLC
- Leader: Jones Ingti Kathar
- President: Jones Ingti Kathar
- Secretary: Sarkiri Rongphar
- Founder: Williamson Sangma
- Founded: 1960
- Ideology: Regionalism
- Political position: Centre-right
- ECI status: Unrecognised
- Alliance: INDIA (2023–present); ASM (2023–present)
- Seats in Rajya Sabha: 0 / 245
- Seats in Lok Sabha: 0 / 543
- Seats in Assam Legislative Assembly: 0 / 126

Election symbol
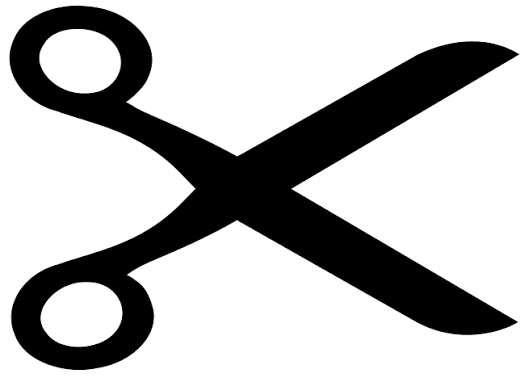
- Scissor

The All Party Hill Leaders Conference (APHLC) is a political party of the Indian states of Meghalaya and Assam. The founder president of the party was Williamson A. Sangma.

The party had made major gains in the Meghalaya Legislative Assembly from 1970 to 1982. They were in power almost 10 years and the party has given four chief minister to Meghalaya state. APHLC fought elections and secured 11 out of 15 seats in Assam Legislative Assembly reserved for autonomous hill districts.

The present President is Jones Ingti Kathar. In 2023, APHLC joined United Opposition Forum in Assam and subsequently Indian National Developmental Inclusive Alliance.

== Leadership ==
Presidents of APHLC
S.no	Name	Term
1.	Williamson A. Sangma	1960-1977
3.	Jones Ingti Kathar	2019- Incumbent

== Electoral performance ==
Lok Sabha							Constituencies	
	Seats			Votes			Constituencies	
	Contested	Won	+/-	Total	%	+/-	Constituencies	
1962	1	1	New	91,850	0.08%	New	Shillong	Won
1967	1	1	Steady	112,492	0.08%		Shillong	Won
1971	2	2	▲1	90,772	0.06%		Shillong	Won
1971	2	2	▲1	90,772	0.06%		Tura	Won
1980	2	1	▲1	13,058	0.01%	New	Shillong	Won
1980	2	1	▲1	13,058	0.01%	New	Tura	Lost
2019	1	0	New	39,583		New	Autonomous District	Lost
2024	1	0	Steady	187,017		▲	Diphu	Lost

Assam Legislative Assembly
	Seats			Votes		
	Contested	Won	+/-	Total	%	+/-
1962	12	11	New	134,591	5.51%	New
1967	12	9	▼2	1,08,447	3.49%	▼
2021	4	0	New	56,941		New
2026	2	0	New	67,489		New

Meghalaya Legislative Assembly
	Seats			Votes		
	Contested	Won	+/-	Total	%	+/-
1972	60	32	New	73,851	35.67%	New
1978	60	16	▼16	94,362	24.92%	▼10.72
1983	60	15	▼1	118,593	24.92%	▲0.15
1988	60	2	▼13	28,391	4.68%	▼
1993	60	3	▲1	64,603	7.93%	▲3.25

== Deputy Speaker of Lok Sabha ==
No.	Lok Sabha	Name (Birth–Death)	Term in office			
No.	Lok Sabha	Name (Birth–Death)	Assumed office	Left office	Time in office	Speaker
1	4th Lok Sabha	George Gilbert Swell (1923–1999)	9 December 1969	20 December 1970	6 Years,315 days	Gurdial Singh Dhillon
1	5th Lok Sabha	George Gilbert Swell (1923–1999)	27 March 1971	18 January 1977	6 Years,315 days	Bali Ram Bhagat

== Lok Sabha Members ==
Lok Sabha Members from APHLC
S.no	Name	Constituency	Votes		Year	
1.	George Gilbert Swell as Independent	Shillong		%	1962	3rd Lok Sabha
1.	George Gilbert Swell as Independent	Shillong		%	1967	4th Lok Sabha
1.	George Gilbert Swell as Independent	Shillong		%	1971	5th Lok Sabha
2.	Karnesh R. Marak	Tura*		%	1971 Held in 1972	5th Lok Sabha
3.	Dr. Bajubon R. Kharlukhi	Shillong		%	1980	7th Lok Sabha

*1972 (There was a bifurcation of an Autonomous district into Tura constituency and Shillong constituency. A separate election was held on 09.03.1972 for Tura constituency.)

== List of Chief Ministers ==
List of chief ministers of Meghalaya
S.no	Name	Portrait	Term
1.	Williamson A. Sangma		
2.	Darwin Diengdoh Pugh		
3.	B. B. Lyngdoh		

== Members of Assam Legislative Assembly ==
Members of Assam Legislative Assembly
Year	Sr. no.	Name	Constituency
1962 Assam Legislative Assembly election	1.	Williamson A. Sangma	Baghmara
1962 Assam Legislative Assembly election	2.	Hopingstone Lyngdoh	Nongstoin
1962 Assam Legislative Assembly election	3.	Brington Buhai Lyngdoh	Nongpoh
1962 Assam Legislative Assembly election	4.	Enowell Pohshna	Jowai
1962 Assam Legislative Assembly election	5.	Wilson Reade	Shillong
1962 Assam Legislative Assembly election	6.	Nallindra Sangma	Dainadubi
1962 Assam Legislative Assembly election	7.	Stanley D. D. Nichols Roy	Cherrapunji
1962 Assam Legislative Assembly election	8.	Emerson Momin	Tura
1962 Assam Legislative Assembly election	9.	Saprawnga	Lungleh (ST)
1962 Assam Legislative Assembly election	10.	R. Thanhlira	Aijal East (ST)
1962 Assam Legislative Assembly election	11.	C. Chhunga	Aijal West (ST)

Members of Assam Legislative Assembly
Year	Sr. no.	Name	Constituency
1967 Assam Legislative Assembly election	1.	Williamson A. Sangma	Baghmara
1967 Assam Legislative Assembly election	2.	Hopingstone Lyngdoh	Nongstoin
1967 Assam Legislative Assembly election	3.	B. B. Lyngdoh	Nongpoh
1967 Assam Legislative Assembly election	4.	Edwingson Barch	Jowai
1967 Assam Legislative Assembly election	5.	Bronson Momin	Phulbari
1967 Assam Legislative Assembly election	6.	Mody Marak	Dainadubi
1967 Assam Legislative Assembly election	7.	Stanley D.D. Nichols Roy	Cherrapunji
1967 Assam Legislative Assembly election	8.	Grohonsing Marak	Tura
1967 Assam Legislative Assembly election	9.	Hoover Hynniewta	Shillong

== Members of Meghalaya Legislative Assembly ==
Members of Meghalaya Legislative Assembly
Year	Name	Constituency
1972 Meghalaya Legislative Assembly election	Williamson A. Sangma	Siju
1972 Meghalaya Legislative Assembly election	Manindra Rava	Tikrikilla
1972 Meghalaya Legislative Assembly election	Brington Buhai Lyngdoh	Nongthymmai
1972 Meghalaya Legislative Assembly election	B. B. Shallam	Jowai
1972 Meghalaya Legislative Assembly election	Edwingson Bareh	Nartiang
1972 Meghalaya Legislative Assembly election	Alexander Warjri	Mawkhar
1972 Meghalaya Legislative Assembly election	Paty Ripple Kyndiah	Jaiaw
1972 Meghalaya Legislative Assembly election	Petergarnett Marbaniang	Laitumkhrah
1972 Meghalaya Legislative Assembly election	Radhon Singh Lyngdoh	Nongkrem
1972 Meghalaya Legislative Assembly election	Beterson Kharkongor	Dienglieng
1972 Meghalaya Legislative Assembly election	Jormanik Syiem	Mylliem
1972 Meghalaya Legislative Assembly election	Humdhrey Nongrum	Langrin
1972 Meghalaya Legislative Assembly election	Kisto M Roy Marabaniang	Mawsynram
1972 Meghalaya Legislative Assembly election	Stanely D D Nochols Roy	Shella
1972 Meghalaya Legislative Assembly election	S P Swer	Sohra
1972 Meghalaya Legislative Assembly election	Darwin Diengdoh Pugh	Nongshken
1972 Meghalaya Legislative Assembly election	Galynstone Laloo	Lyngkyrdem
1972 Meghalaya Legislative Assembly election	Nimosh Sangma	Dalu
1972 Meghalaya Legislative Assembly election	Brojendra Sangma	Dambuk Aga
1972 Meghalaya Legislative Assembly election	Jackman Marak	Chokpot
1972 Meghalaya Legislative Assembly election	Choronsing Sangma	Rongrenggiri
1972 Meghalaya Legislative Assembly election	Pritington Sangma	Kharkutta
1972 Meghalaya Legislative Assembly election	Elwin Sangma	Songsak
1972 Meghalaya Legislative Assembly election	Salseng C. Marak	Resubelpara
1972 Meghalaya Legislative Assembly election	Medison A Sangma	Rongchugiri
1972 Meghalaya Legislative Assembly election	Grohonsing Marak	Bajengdoba Assembly constituency
1972 Meghalaya Legislative Assembly election	Redison Momin	Dadengiri
1972 Meghalaya Legislative Assembly election	Percylina Marak	Rongram
1972 Meghalaya Legislative Assembly election	Sanford Marak	Rangsakona
1972 Meghalaya Legislative Assembly election	Plansing Marak	Kherapara
1972 Meghalaya Legislative Assembly election	Ira Marak	Dalamgiri
1972 Meghalaya Legislative Assembly election	Samarendra Sangma	Salmanpara

== MLAs of Meghalaya after the Split of 1977 ==
Members of Meghalaya Legislative Assembly
Year	Sr. no.	Name	Constituency
1978 Meghalaya Legislative Assembly election	1.	B. B. Lyngdoh	Lyngkyrdem
1978 Meghalaya Legislative Assembly election	2.	Darwin Diengdoh Pugh	Mawkhar
1978 Meghalaya Legislative Assembly election	3.	Paty Ripple Kyndiah	Jaiaw
1978 Meghalaya Legislative Assembly election	4.	Johndeng Pohrmen	War-jaintia
1978 Meghalaya Legislative Assembly election	5.	Albin Lamare	Nongbah-wahiajer
1978 Meghalaya Legislative Assembly election	6.	Grosswell Mylliemngap	Sohryngkham
1978 Meghalaya Legislative Assembly election	7.	Phaindrojen Swer	Sohra
1978 Meghalaya Legislative Assembly election	8.	Stanely D D Nochols Roy	Shella
1978 Meghalaya Legislative Assembly election	9.	Beninstand G. Momin	Medinipathar
1978 Meghalaya Legislative Assembly election	10.	Bronson Momin	Dadenggiri
1978 Meghalaya Legislative Assembly election	11.	Girash Marak	Selsella
1978 Meghalaya Legislative Assembly election	12.	Crunden S. Sangma	Rongram
1978 Meghalaya Legislative Assembly election	13.	Jackman Marak	Chokpot
1978 Meghalaya Legislative Assembly election	14.	Alfrien Marak	Kherapara
1978 Meghalaya Legislative Assembly election	15.	Armison Marak	Dalamgiri
1978 Meghalaya Legislative Assembly election	16.	Jendew Ch. Marak	Rangsakona

Members of Meghalaya Legislative Assembly
Year	Sr. no.	Name	Constituency
1983 Meghalaya Legislative Assembly election	1.	B. B. Lyngdoh	Lyngkyrdem
1983 Meghalaya Legislative Assembly election	2.	Darwin Diengdoh Pugh	Mawkhar
1983 Meghalaya Legislative Assembly election	3.	Paty Ripple Kyndiah	Jaiaw
1983 Meghalaya Legislative Assembly election	4.	Nihon Ksih	Rymbai
1983 Meghalaya Legislative Assembly election	5.	Kitdor Syiem	Mairang
1983 Meghalaya Legislative Assembly election	6.	Oris Lyngdoh	Mylliem
1983 Meghalaya Legislative Assembly election	7.	Bindo Lanong	Malki-nongthymmai
1983 Meghalaya Legislative Assembly election	8.	Justine Khonglah	Laitumkharah
1983 Meghalaya Legislative Assembly election	9.	Korbar Singh	Mawkhar
1983 Meghalaya Legislative Assembly election	10.	Grosswell Mylliemngap	Sohryngkham
1983 Meghalaya Legislative Assembly election	11.	S. Galmendar Singh Lyngdoh	Shella
1983 Meghalaya Legislative Assembly election	12.	Beninstand G. Momin	Medinipathar
1983 Meghalaya Legislative Assembly election	13.	Parimal Rava	Phulbari
1983 Meghalaya Legislative Assembly election	14.	Crunden S. Sangma	Rongram
1983 Meghalaya Legislative Assembly election	15.	Meckenson K. Sangma	Salmanpara

All Party Hill Leaders Conference(Armison Marak Group) MLAs

Members of Meghalaya Legislative Assembly
Year	Sr. no.	Name	Constituency
1988 Meghalaya Legislative Assembly election	1.	Armison Marak	Dalamgiri
1988 Meghalaya Legislative Assembly election	2.	Crunden Sangma	Rongram

All Party Hill Leaders Conference(Armison Marak Group) MLAs

Members of Meghalaya Legislative Assembly
Year	Sr. no.	Name	Constituency
1993 Meghalaya Legislative Assembly election	1.	Henry Lamin	Nartiang
1993 Meghalaya Legislative Assembly election	2.	H. S. Shylla	Nongkrem
1993 Meghalaya Legislative Assembly election	3.	Pynshai M. Syiem	Mylliem

== APHLC under J. I. Kathar ==
Assam Legislative Assembly Elections

Year	District	Constituency			Candidates				
Year	District	No.	Name	Alliance	President	Candidate	Votes	%	Outcome
2021 Assam Legislative Assembly election	Karbi Anglong district	1	Diphu	None	Jones Ingti Kathar	Jones Ingti Kathar	23,356	15.34%	Lost
2021 Assam Legislative Assembly election	Karbi Anglong district	2	Baithalangso	None	Jones Ingti Kathar	Bikram Hanse	17,965	11.01%	Lost
2021 Assam Legislative Assembly election	Karbi Anglong district	4	Bokajan	None	Jones Ingti Kathar	Semson Teron	6,630	5.57%	Lost
2021 Assam Legislative Assembly election	West Karbi Anglong district	3	Howraghat	None	Jones Ingti Kathar	Suren Kramsa	8,990	8.65%	Lost
2026 Assam Legislative Assembly election	Karbi Anglong	1	Diphu	Asom Sonmilito Morcha	Jones Ingti Kathar	Jones Ingti Kathar	13,657	26.88	Lost
2026 Assam Legislative Assembly election	West Karbi Anglong	2	Amri	Asom Sonmilito Morcha	Jones Ingti Kathar	Bikram Hanse	26,363	33.20	Lost

Indian General Elections to Lok Sabha

Year	District	Constituency		Candidates				
Year	District	No.	Name	President	Candidate	Votes	%	Position
2019 Indian general election	Karbi Anglong district	1.	Autonomous District Lok Sabha constituency	Jones Ingti Kathar	Jones Ingti Kathar as Independent Candidate	39,583	6.41%	3rd Position
2019 Indian general election	West Karbi Anglong district	1.	Autonomous District Lok Sabha constituency	Jones Ingti Kathar	Jones Ingti Kathar as Independent Candidate	39,583	6.41%	3rd Position
2024 Indian general election	Karbi Anglong district	2.	Diphu Lok Sabha constituency	Jones Ingti Kathar	Jones Ingti Kathar as Independent Candidate	1,87,017	27.39%	2nd Position
2024 Indian general election	West Karbi Anglong district	2.	Diphu Lok Sabha constituency	Jones Ingti Kathar	Jones Ingti Kathar as Independent Candidate	1,87,017	27.39%	2nd Position
