= Williamson A. Sangma =

First chief minister of the Indian state of Meghalaya

2nd Governor of Mizoram
- In office 21 July 1989 – 7 February 1990
- Chief Minister: Lal Thanhawla
- Preceded by: K. V. Krishna Rao
- Succeeded by: Swaraj Kaushal

1st Chief Minister of Meghalaya
- In office 2 April 1983 – 5 February 1988
- Governor: Prakash Mehrotra; Tribeni Sahai Misra; Bhishma Narain Singh
- Preceded by: B.B. Lyngdoh
- Succeeded by: P. A. Sangma
- In office 7 May 1981 – 24 February 1983
- Governor: Lallan Prasad Singh; Prakash Mehrotra
- Preceded by: B.B. Lyngdoh
- Succeeded by: B.B. Lyngdoh
- In office 2 April 1970 – 3 March 1978
- Governor: Braj Kumar Nehru; Lallan Prasad Singh
- Preceded by: Office Established
- Succeeded by: Darwin Diengdoh Pugh

Assembly Member for Baghmara
- In office 1962–1993
- Preceded by: Emerson Momin
- Succeeded by: Lotsing A. Sangma

Assembly Member for Phulbari
- In office 1957–1962
- Preceded by: Emonsing M Sangma
- Succeeded by: Emonsing M Sangma

Personal details
- Born: 18 October 1919 Baghmara, South Garo Hills district
- Died: 25 October 1990 (aged 71)
- Party: APHLC, INC

Williamson Ampang Sangma (18 October 1919 – 25 October 1990) was a Garo leader from India and the first Chief Minister of Meghalaya. He also served as Governor of Mizoram from July 1989 to February 1990.

Williamson was a statesman, tribal leader, and a pioneer in leading the struggle for the creation of Meghalaya state.

== Biography ==
Williamson was born in Baghmara, South Garo Hills district.

== Political career ==
Sangma represented the Baghmara assembly constituency several times, even after merging his political outfit into the Congress (I) party. Williamson A. Sangma, along with Salseng C. Marak, Mukul M. Sangma and Conrad K. Sangma, are the only Chief Ministers of Meghalaya to have completed a full term of five years in office.

=== Hill state movement ===
With prior military service, Sangma entered the political field in 1952, and subsequently was elected as the Chief Executive Member (CEM) of the Garo Hills Autonomous District Council (GHADC). On 16 June 1954, the members of the executive committees of the Autonomous District Council of the Garo Hills (GHADC), the Khasi Hills (Khasi Hills Autonomous District Council), the Jaintia Hills (Jaintia Hills Autonomous District Council), the Lushai Hills (Mizo Hills), and the North Cachar Hills District Council held a meeting at Shillong, and pleaded for the establishment of a separate Hill state on the ground that there was no adequate safeguard for the preservation of the identity of the hill people in the Sixth Schedule of the Constitution of India. The meeting demanded the creation of a separate state for all the hill areas of Assam, to be called "Eastern Hill State." Accordingly, they, including W.A. Sangma as the Chief, sent a set of suggestions for the amendment of the Sixth Schedule to the members of Indian parliament.

Though Wilson Reade, chairman of the Khasi National Durba, was the first one to demand a separate hill state, it was Sangma who accelerated the movement successfully. He led the sustained struggle by the Garos, the Jaintas, and the Khasis for the hill state from the 1950s. As first Chief Executive Member of the Garo Hills Autonomous District Council (GHADC), Sangma called a conference of the people of the autonomous hill districts of then Assam at Tura on 6–8 October 1954, to consider the demand of a hill state. An appeal was sent to the leaders of all the tribal organisations and parties of the autonomous districts to sign the memorandum. Under his leadership, the conference passed the resolution to submit a memorandum to the States Reorganisation Commission (SRC) for the formation of a separate "Eastern Hills State." The memorandum emphasising the following points was submitted to the SRC:

1. The people of the hills and the plains differed from each other,
2. The attempt of the Assamese people to impose their language and culture on the hill tribes,
3. The Assamese dominance in the legislature and the services, and
4. The autonomy granted under the Sixth Schedule was not adequate.

The separate state question became an election issue in the 1957 general elections in Assam. The EITU, United Mizo Freedom Organization (UMFO), the Mizo Union, and the Garo National Union captured a majority of seats giving the impetus and popular mandate for the Hills Movement, while the Congress lost all five seats in the United Khasi-Jaintia Hills, three seats in Garo Hills, and one seat in Mikir Hills and North Cachar Hills. Bimala Prasad Chaliha, with the confidence from the hills people, became Chief Minister of Assam. In 1957, Sangma was elected to the Assam Legislative Assembly. In the following year, he joined the cabinet of Assam to look after the departments of tribal regions, information, publicity, and transport. After Indian independence, when the Nagas declared war against India, the tribes inhabiting the Khasi-Jhantia-Garo Hills extended co-operation to Government of Assam. As a result, Williamson Sangma became a member of the cabinet of Chaliha, Chief Minister of Assam, as a minister in charge of the "Tribal Areas Department." When the Assamese language bill was passed in spite of opposition from tribal people, later, he resigned from the cabinet to fight for the cause of separate statehood.

==== Imposition of Assamese state language impact ====
In 1960, the Assam Provincial Congress Committee (APCC) met 22 April, and directed Chief Minister Chaliha to declare Assamese as the official state language. This further infuriated the tribal people, but accelerated the movement for a Hills state, and subsequently, in an "All Assam Hills leaders conference" held at Tura, Garo Hills, on 28 April 1960, they vehemently opposed the imposition of the Assamese language and demanded the immediate amendment of the Sixth Schedule. With outbreak of violence between the Assamese speaking and Bengali speaking communities in the Assam plains, it further united the Hill parties and Hill state movement gained its momentum once again. In June 1960, Sangma called for a conference of all leaders of all the political parties in the hill areas. The conference unanimously resolved to oppose the "Official Language Bill". It also resolved to form the "All Party Hill Leaders Conference" (APHLC), with Sangma as its first chairman. In September 1960, the APHLC's Council of Action issued an ultimatum to the Assam CM; consequently, Sangma resigned his cabinet post in protest against the official Assamese language policy adopted by the Assam government.

The Assam Assembly adopted Assamese as their State language on the night of 24 October 1960, following which the third APHLC met at Haflong in North Cachar and demanded the immediate creation of a separate Hill state.

=== New government proposals ===
Under the leadership of Sangma, the APHLC met Jawaharlal Nehru, Prime Minister of India, in November 1960, and raised apprehensions about the imposition of the Assamese language on Tribals. Nehru, however, opposed the proposal for a separate state. When the delegation met Nehru again in December 1960, Nehru offered a Scottish plan—full authority for tribals in internal matters and complete control over expenditures and freedom in regard to language – as well as a constitution of the committee in the Legislative Assembly of Assam comprising all the MLA's from the hills to examine the legislative proposals for the hill areas. The APHLC in its fourth session at Shillong in April 1961, rejected the proposal, and resolved to boycott the 1962 general elections. While APHLC rejected the Scottish plan, District Congress Committee accepted it and decided to contest the elections in 1961. The APHLC's Council of Action, intending to prevent a split, decided to contest the elections, and consequently the APHLC won 11 out of 15 seats contested.

In 1963, the Mizo Union took a stand against the APHLC as they felt their individuality would be lost by joining the Khasis and the Garos. When Sangma and an APHLC delegation met Nehru on 10 June 1963, a new plan was proposed named the Nehru plan — that contemplated that the hill areas of Assam would remain within the state of Assam, but enjoy ninety percent of the autonomy of a state – there should be a Cabinet minister in charge of administration of the hill areas who would have to act according to the norms of Cabinet government. The Nehru plan, however, was opposed by the Government of Assam, the Chief Minister of Assam, and the Congress party itself in Assam.

After the death of Nehru, Indira Gandhi became Prime Minister of India in 1966. The APHLC, having decided to boycott the 1967 general elections. submitted another memorandum to Indira Gandhi demanding a separate Hill state when she visited Shillong in December 1966. Indira instead, proposed the Reorganization plan, with an official statement from Government of India on 13 January 1967 to reorganise the state of Assam on the basis of a Federal structure conferring upon the hill areas equal status with the rest of the state of Assam. The Communist Party of India, stepped in, differing from the APHLC and Congress on a Federal structure in name of reorganisation, and called for the national integration of tribal people within the mainstream of Indian life, rather than merely looking from the development angle of tribal people with the statement:

The alien Imperialist rulers of the country pursued a policy of keeping the tribal people of the Hills of Assam economically, socially, culturally and politically dwarfed deliberately retarding the normal process of developments of these people. This was quite in keeping with the Imperialist plan of perpertuating their exploitation and domination of our country.

... the best interest of both the Hills and the Plains will be served by an integrated Assam. But we do not subscribe to the views of those who would try to achieve that integration even by applying force on the Hills. Such a policy of forced integration may sound heroic. But this is not only undemocratic, but is also damaging to the interest of the country as a whole.

Sangma and the APHLC delegation, having welcomed the Federal structure proposal, decided to participate in a committee composed of representatives from the APHLC, Government of India, and the Government of Assam to work out the details of the proposed Federal scheme, subject to the conditions that in the Federal structure, the hill state unit should have equal voice and status with the units comprising the remaining state of Assam. With bitter opposition from the APCC faction opposed to Chief Minister Chaliha, the committee was not constituted to work out the details of the Federal scheme. Instead, a joint discussion in Delhi on 7 July 1967, with representatives from various political parties of the Plains and the APHLC was called, to make an effort to reach an agreed solution for the reorganisation of Assam. The APHLC boycotted the commission as it not only opposed the Federal idea, but also resigned all the seats it held in Khasi and the Garo hills on 25 May 1968 and began a non-violent Satyagraha on 10 September 1968 to campaign for statehood.

==== Autonomous state ====
With the Satyagraha protest, the Government of India on 11 September 1968 produced the Autonomous State Plan for the Garo Hills and the United Khasi-Jaintia Hills districts. The Mikir and the North Cachar Hills districts were given the option to join the autonomous state and decided to stay within Assam . On 24 December 1969, the Parliament of India passed the "Assam Reorganization (Meghalaya) Bill", to create an autonomous state—to be known as Meghalaya, within the state of Assam, comprising the United Khasi-Jaintia Hills district and the Garo hills district as defined in the Sixth Schedule.

==== Meghalaya state ====
The faction that opposed an autonomous state left the All Party Hill Leaders Conference led by Williamson Sangma and formed a separate party named the Hill State People's Democratic Party (HSPDP). To counter the influence gained by the HSPDP in certain areas, the All Party Hill Leaders Conference requested the PM on 3 September 1970, to declare Meghalaya as a full-fledged state. On 10 November 1970, the Government informed the Lok Sabha that the government had decided to accept in principle the Meghalaya demand for statehood. Finally, on 21 January 1972, Meghalaya became a full-fledged state.

The peace in the then-autonomous districts of Assam was disturbed when the state administration decided to impose the Assamese language as the state language using The Official Languages Bill on 18 October 1960 threatening the tribes, who were apprehensive of losing their culture and identity; consequently, he feared that the Assam government's linguistic policy would militate against the ethnic identity of the hill people and hence, he led the agitations that resulted them an autonomous status under the "Assam reorganisation (Meghalaya) Act 1969" until it became a full-fledged state on 21 January 1972. Prior to becoming full-fledged Meghalaya state of the Indian Union, the present areas of Meghalaya enjoyed internal autonomy under the provisions of Sixth Schedule of Constitution of India—it also had District Councils in the Garo Hills and the United Khasi and Jaintia Hills Districts.

According to B.B. Lyngdoh, former Chief Minister of Meghalaya, who shared the Chief Minister's office with Capt. Williamson Sangma, is said to have told that the imposition of Assamese language in 1960 was the sole reason for the fight of separate statehood, for Garo, Jhantia, and Khasis areas to be carved out as Meghalaya state:

If in 1960 Assamese were not made the state language we could have stayed as inhabitant of the same state like brothers.

=== Post-Meghalaya state formation ===
In the Meghalaya legislative assembly elections held in March 1972, after the new state was established, regional parties secured a majority, while Congress secured nine seats out of total 60 seats in assembly. W.A. Sangma of the APHLC was sworn in as its first Chief Minister with a majority. However, a faction of the APHLC led by W.A. Sangma defected and merged with the Congress after the APHLC's Mendipather conference in 1976. This new merger provided the Congress with a strong footing in the new state, particularly in the Garo Hills and east Khasi Hills.

With the realisation of Meghalaya as a state, it ultimately united the areas of the Khasi, Jainta, and the Garo Hills under the leadership of Williamson Sangma. He being one of the major leaders of the hill statehood movement, he always craved a better deal for the Garos, who were economically worse off than their Khasi-Jainta brethren. He also made sure the Meghalaya Board of School Education (MBOSE), which he considered to be of prime importance, was in Garo Hills.

== In his honour ==
After his death in 1999, succeeding Government of Meghalaya honoured him by naming of public properties, including educational institutes, after him.

- The State Museum of Meghalaya, founded in 1975, was named the Captain Williamson Sangma State Museum
- The headquarters of the East Garo Hills district of Meghalaya, was named after him as Williamnagar.
- Baljek Airport in West Garo Hills is named after him.
- Captain Williamson Sangma Technical University in Tura, Meghalaya.
- Capt Williamson Memorial College, at Baghmara, in 1994.

== See also ==
- List of governors of Mizoram
- Capt. Williamson Sangma State Museum
- East Garo Hills district
- Williamnagar
