= Flinder Anderson Khonglam =

First independent legislator served as chief minister in any state

Dr. Flinder Anderson Khonglam

8th Chief Minister of Meghalaya
- In office 7 December 2001 – 4 March 2003
- Deputy: D. D. Lapang, Lotsing Sangma
- Preceded by: E.K. Mawlong
- Succeeded by: D. D. Lapang
- Constituency: Sohra

Personal details
- Born: 6 February 1945 Malki, Shillong, British India
- Died: 22 May 2012 (aged 67) Shillong, Meghalaya, India
- Party: Independent
- Profession: Physician

Dr. Flinder Anderson Khonglam (6 February 1945 – 22 May 2012) was an Indian politician and physician. He served as the eighth Chief Minister of Meghalaya from 2001 to 2003. Khonglam was the first independent legislator to serve as the Chief Minister of any Indian state in history.

== Biography ==
=== Early life and career ===
Khonglam was born in Malki, Shillong, Assam (now Meghalaya) on 6 February 1945. He was the oldest of eight children born to his parents, Richard N. Lyngdoh and L. Khonglam. He was a doctor, working at Nazareth Hospital and several other government-owned medical facilities in the state.

=== Political career ===
Khonglam represented the Sohra (Cherrapunji) constituency in the Meghalaya Legislative Assembly for almost twenty years. He first ran for the Assembly in 1978, but was defeated in the election by an opponent from the Hill State People's Democratic Party (HSPDP). However, Khonglam, an independent won the 1983 state election by defeating an incumbent from the HSPDP. In 1988, Khonglam lost his seat in the Assembly to an Indian National Congress candidate.

He was re-elected to the Meghalaya Assembly in 1993 as an independent. He was re-elected to two more consecutive terms from the same constituency thereafter. He won re-election during the 1990s as an independent. Khonglam was elected again in 2003, this time as a candidate for the HSPDP.

He also headed the Peoples Forum of Meghalaya (PFM) and represented Sohra within the Khasi Hills Autonomous District Council (KHADC).

=== Chief Minister of Meghalaya ===
Khonglam's predecessor, former Chief Minister E.K. Mawlong, was forced to resign from office due to a scandal involving the construction of the Meghalaya House in Kolkata. After a month, the coalition of the People's Forum of Meghalaya (PFM) formed the government on 7 December 2001 with Khonglam as Chief Minister. The coalition consisted of defectors from Mawlong's UDP, the Congress(I), the Nationalist Congress Party (NCP), HSPDP, the People's Democratic Movement (PDM) and Khonglam. Three BJP MLAs also offered to support the new government from the outside. He became the first independent Chief Minister of an Indian state in history.

His ministry had 37 members, including 28 of cabinet rank, making it then the largest in the state's history. Many of the ministers already had ministerial positions in the previous government. Former chief minister D. D. Lapang was made the deputy chief minister. Khonglam served as Chief Minister until 4 March 2003.

=== Later life ===
Khonglam was defeated for re-election in the 2008 legislative election by Dr. Phlour W. Khongjee of the Indian National Congress party.

He suffered from diabetes, which contributed to health problems in his later life, including one documented diabetic stroke. Khonglam fainted at his home in Laitumkhrah, Shillong, on 22 May 2012. He was taken to Bethany Hospital in Shillong, where he died at 6:30 p.m. IST on 22 May 2012, at the age of 67. Khonglam was buried in a cemetery in Malki. Dignitaries in attendance at the funeral included the Meghalaya Deputy Chief Ministers, Bindo Lanong and Rowell Lyngdoh, and Hopingstone Lingdoh, the leader of the Hill State People's Democratic Party.
