= P. A. Sangma =

Indian politician (1947–2016)

Purno Agitok Sangma
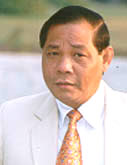
- Informal portrait, 1996

11th Speaker of the Lok Sabha
- In office 25 May 1996 – 23 March 1998
- President: Shankar Dayal Sharma; K. R. Narayanan
- Deputy: Suraj Bhan
- Preceded by: Shivraj Patil
- Succeeded by: G. M. C. Balayogi

21st Union Minister of Information and Broadcasting
- In office 15 September 1995 – 16 May 1996
- Prime Minister: P. V. Narasimha Rao
- Preceded by: Kamakhya Prasad Singh Deo (as MoS I/C)
- Succeeded by: Sushma Swaraj

Member of Parliament, Lok Sabha
- In office 26 May 2014 – 5 March 2016
- Preceded by: Agatha Sangma
- Succeeded by: Conrad Sangma
- Constituency: Tura, Meghalaya
- In office 22 June 1991 – 7 March 2008
- Preceded by: Sanford Marak
- Succeeded by: Agatha Sangma
- Constituency: Tura, Meghalaya
- In office 24 March 1977 – 2 December 1989
- Preceded by: Lieutenant Karnesh Rangsa Marak
- Succeeded by: Sanford Marak
- Constituency: Tura, Meghalaya

4th Chief Minister of Meghalaya
- In office 6 February 1988 – 25 March 1990
- Governor: Bhishma Narain Singh; Hari Dev Joshi; A. A. Rahim
- Preceded by: Williamson A. Sangma
- Succeeded by: B. B. Lyngdoh

Personal details
- Born: Purno Agitok Sangma; 1 September 1947 Chapahati, Assam, India (present-day Meghalaya, India)
- Died: 4 March 2016 (aged 68) New Delhi, Delhi, India
- Party: National People's Party (2012–2016)
- Other political affiliations: Nationalist Congress Party (1999–2004; 2005–2012); Trinamool Congress (2004–2005); Indian National Congress (until 1999)
- Spouse: Soradini K. Sangma (m. 1973)
- Children: Conrad; James; Christie; Agatha
- Education: Dibrugarh University
- Occupation: Politician

Purno Agitok Sangma (1 September 1947 – 4 March 2016) was an Indian politician who served as the 11th Speaker of the Lok Sabha from 1996 to 1998 and the 4th Chief Minister of Meghalaya from 1988 to 1990. He served as a member of the Lok Sabha from Tura in Meghalaya from 2014 to 2016, 1991 to 2008 and from 1977 to 1989 and the Minister of Information and Broadcasting in the Rao ministry from 1995 to 1996. He was the co-founder of the Nationalist Congress Party and founder of the National People's Party.

Sangma contested the 2012 Indian presidential election, supported by the Bharatiya Janata Party and the AIADMK. However he lost to Pranab Mukherjee of the Indian National Congress. Sangma was awarded the Padma Vibhushan, India's second highest civilian award, posthumously in 2017, in the field of Public Affairs and was the first recipient of the award from Meghalaya.

== Early and personal life ==
Sangma was born on 1 September 1947 in Chapahati, a village in the erstwhile Garo Hills district of Assam (in present-day West Garo Hills, Meghalaya), to Dipchon Ch. Marak and Chimri A. Sangma as one of their seven children. He lost his father when he was 11 and had to quit his studies due to poverty. He was helped to return to school by a Salesian Father Giovanni Battista Busolin. Later, Sangma obtained a Bachelor of Arts degree from St. Anthony's College in Shillong before shifting to Dibrugarh in Assam, where he taught in the Don Bosco High School while pursuing a Master of Arts degree in international politics from Dibrugarh University.

Sangma married Soradini K. Sangma in 1973. They have two sons and two daughters together. His son Conrad serves as the Chief Minister of Meghalaya and his daughter Agatha is a former Member of Parliament from the Tura constituency. Agatha was elected from Tura to the 15th Lok Sabha elections in 2009, and at 29, was the youngest minister in the UPA ministry.

Sangma called himself a devout Christian.

== Political career ==
In 1973, Sangma became Vice-President of the Pradesh Youth Congress in Meghalaya and became the General Secretary of the party in 1975. He served in that position from 1975 to 1980.

In 1977, he was elected to the 6th Lok Sabha from Tura constituency in Meghalaya and represented the same constituency multiple times, from 1977-1988, 1991-2008, 2014–2016. The breaks in 1988 and 2008 were caused by his return to Meghalaya state politics. He became Speaker of the Lok Sabha in 1996.

== Chief Minister of Meghalaya ==
He was the Chief Minister of Meghalaya from 1988 to 1990.

== Speaker of the Lok Sabha ==
He was the 11th speaker of the Lok Sabha.

== Formation of Nationalist Congress Party ==
Sangma was expelled from the Congress on 20 May 1999, along with Sharad Pawar and Tariq Anwar, for raising the banner of revolt against Sonia Gandhi over the fact that she was a foreign-born citizen. Sangma, along with Pawar and Anwar, wanted a native-born citizen to be put forward as the Prime Ministerial candidate. After his departure from the Congress Party, he was one of the founders of the Nationalist Congress Party (NCP) along with Sharad Pawar and Tariq Anwar in 1999. In January 2004, P.A. Sangma created a split in the NCP after Sharad Pawar became close to the NCP's former rival, Sonia Gandhi. After losing a battle for the NCP election symbol, Sangma later merged his faction with the Trinamool Congress, forming the Nationalist Trinamool Congress. Sangma was one of two NTC MPs elected. He resigned from his Lok Sabha seat on 10 October 2005 as a member of the AITC, and was re-elected as an NCP candidate in February 2006. He resigned from the 14th Lok Sabha for the second time in March 2008 to take part in the 2008 Meghalaya Legislative Assembly election.

On 5 January 2013, Sangma launched the National People's Party at the national level. The National People's Party managed to win two seats in the Meghalaya Legislative Assembly in the 2013 Meghalaya Legislative Assembly election. In 2014, Sangma was elected to Lok Sabha from Tura, and died mid-term in 2016.

=== Presidential election ===
Sangma's candidature for the 2012 presidential election was proposed by AIADMK and Biju Janta Dal, and later, supported by the BJP as well. Sangma resigned from the NCP on 20 June 2012 after opposition from Sharad Pawar over his presidential candidature. Former Union Minister and Congress tribal leader Arvind Netam also came out strongly in favour of the candidature of Sangma for the presidential post.

On 22 July, Pranab Mukherjee was declared the victor over Sangma, crossing the half-way mark of 525,140 votes after votes in half the states had been tallied. While securing the required quota, Mukherjee secured 558,194 votes to Sangma's 239,966. After the final results were published, Mukherjee secured 713,424 votes, while Sangma secured 317,032 votes. The Returning Officer for the election, and the Secretary General of the Rajya Sabha, Vivek Agnihotri, then declared Mukherjee to be elected as President of India. Sangma subsequently accused the President-elect of graft.

	MP Votes	MLA Votes	Total
Pranab Mukherjee	373,116	340,647	713,763
P. A. Sangma	145,848	170,139	315,987

== Death ==
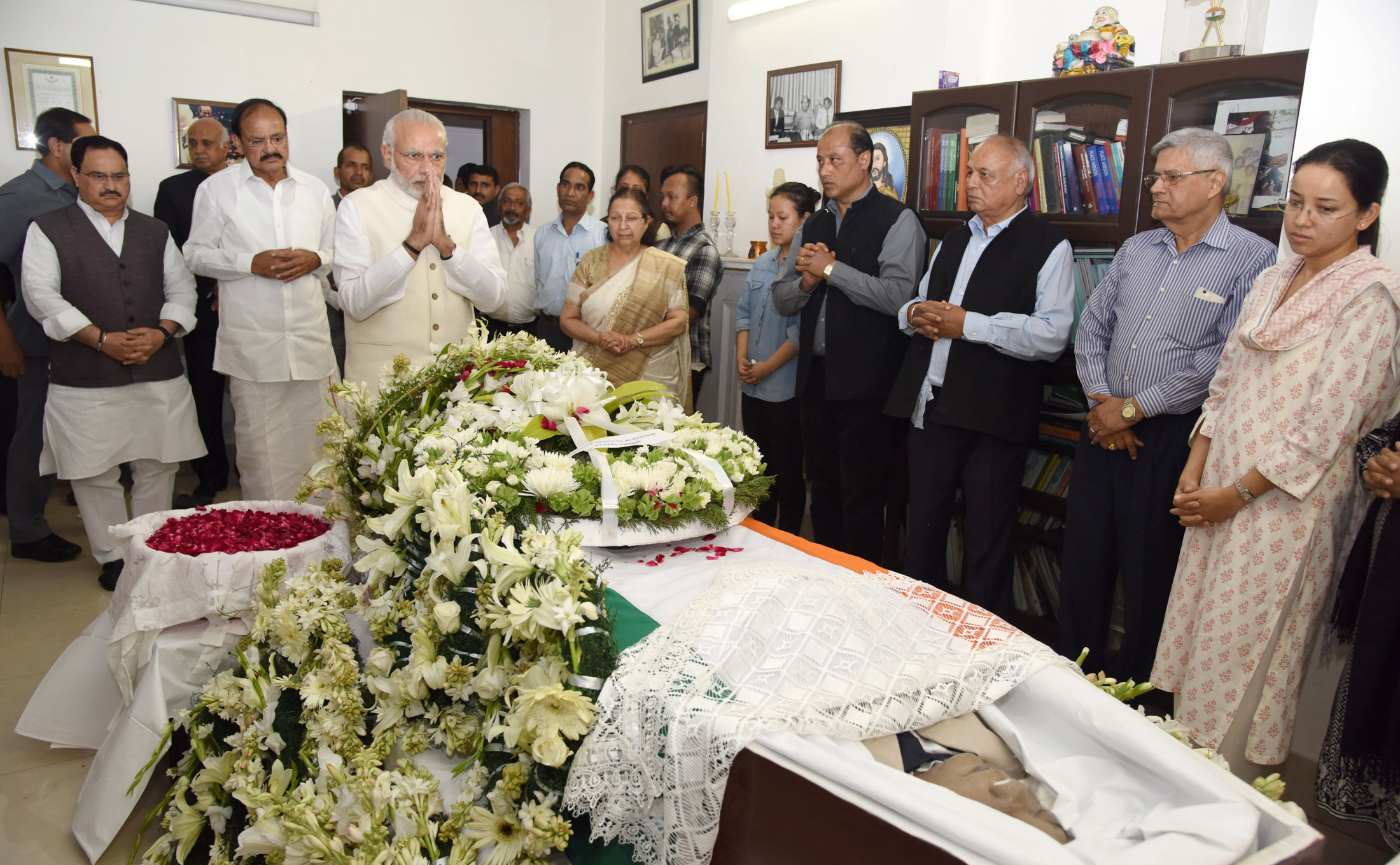
Prime Minister Narendra Modi and cabinet members paying their respects at Sangma's wake

On the morning of 4 March 2016, Sangma died from cardiac arrest in New Delhi. He was aged 68.

== Positions held ==
- 1974 - Vice President of Meghalaya Pradesh Youth Congress
- 1975 - The General Secretary of the Meghalaya Pradesh Congress Committee
- 1977 - Member of Parliament, Tura constituency (1977 to 1988, first stint)
- 1980 - Joint Secretary of the All India Congress Committee
- 1980 - Deputy Minister in charge of Industry
- 1982 - Deputy Minister, Ministry of Commerce
- 1984 - Minister of State holding charge of Commerce and Supply
- 1984 - Minister of State for Home Affairs
- 1986 - Minister of State for Labour with Independent Charge
- 1988 - Member, Meghalaya Legislative Assembly
- 1988 - Chief Minister of Meghalaya
- 1990 - Leader of Opposition, Meghalaya Legislative Assembly
- 1991 - Re-elected, Member of Parliament, Tura constituency (1991-2008, second stint)
- 1991-93 - Union Minister of State, Coal (Independent Charge)
- 1993-95 - Union Minister of State, Labour (Independent Charge)
- February–September 1995 - Union Minister of State, Labour
- 1995-96 - Union Cabinet Minister of Information and Broadcasting
- 1996 - Re-elected, Member of Parliament, Tura constituency
- 1996-98 - Speaker of Lok Sabha -Chairman, (i) Business Advisory Committee; (ii) Rules Committee; (iii) General Purposes Committee; (iv) Standing Committee of the Conference of Presiding Officers of the Legislative Bodies in India; and (v) Institute of Constitutional and Parliamentary Studies;

President, (i) Indian Parliamentary Group, (ii) National Group of Inter-Parliamentary Union; and (iii) India Branch of the Commonwealth Parliamentary Association

- 1998 - Re-elected, Member of Parliament, Tura constituency, as member of Congress
- 1998 - Member, Committee on External Affairs and its Sub-Committee-I
- 1998 - Vice-President, Indian Institute of Public Administration
- 1998 - Member, Consultative Committee, Ministry of External Affairs
- 1999 - Re-elected, Member of Parliament, Tura constituency, as member of NCP
- 1999 - Member, Committee on Labour and Welfare
- 2000 - Member, National Commission to Review the Working of the Constitution
- 2002 - Member, Committee on External Affairs
- 2003 - Member, Committee on Home Affairs
- 2004 - Re-elected, Member of Parliament, Tura constituency
- 2004 - Member, Committee on External Affairs, Member, Committee on Private Members Bills and Resolutions, Member, Consultative Committee, Ministry of Home Affairs
- 2006 - Re-elected to Lok Sabha as N.C.P. candidate on 23.2.2006, Tura constituency
- 2008 - Member, Meghalaya Legislative Assembly
- 2014 - Elected to Lok Sabha from Tura

== See also ==
- Politics of India
- Nuclear disarmament

Lok Sabha
Preceded by K.R. Marak	Member of Parliament for Tura; 1977–1989	Succeeded by Sanford Marak
Preceded by Sanford Marak	Member of Parliament for Tura; 1991–2008	Succeeded by Agatha Sangma
Preceded by Agatha Sangma	Member of Parliament for Tura; 2014 – 2016	Succeeded by Conrad Sangma
Political offices
Preceded by Williamson Sangma	Chief Minister of Meghalaya; 6 February 1988 – 25 March 1990	Succeeded by Brington Buhai Lyngdoh
Preceded by Hari Krishan Lal Bhagat	Minister of Human Resource Development; 1995 – 1996	Succeeded by Jaipal Reddy
Preceded by Shivraj Patil	Speaker of the Lok Sabha; 25 May 1996 – 23 March 1998	Succeeded by Ganti Mohana Chandra Balayogi
