= First Conrad Sangma ministry =

Government of Meghalaya (2018–)

- 24th Ministry of Meghalaya
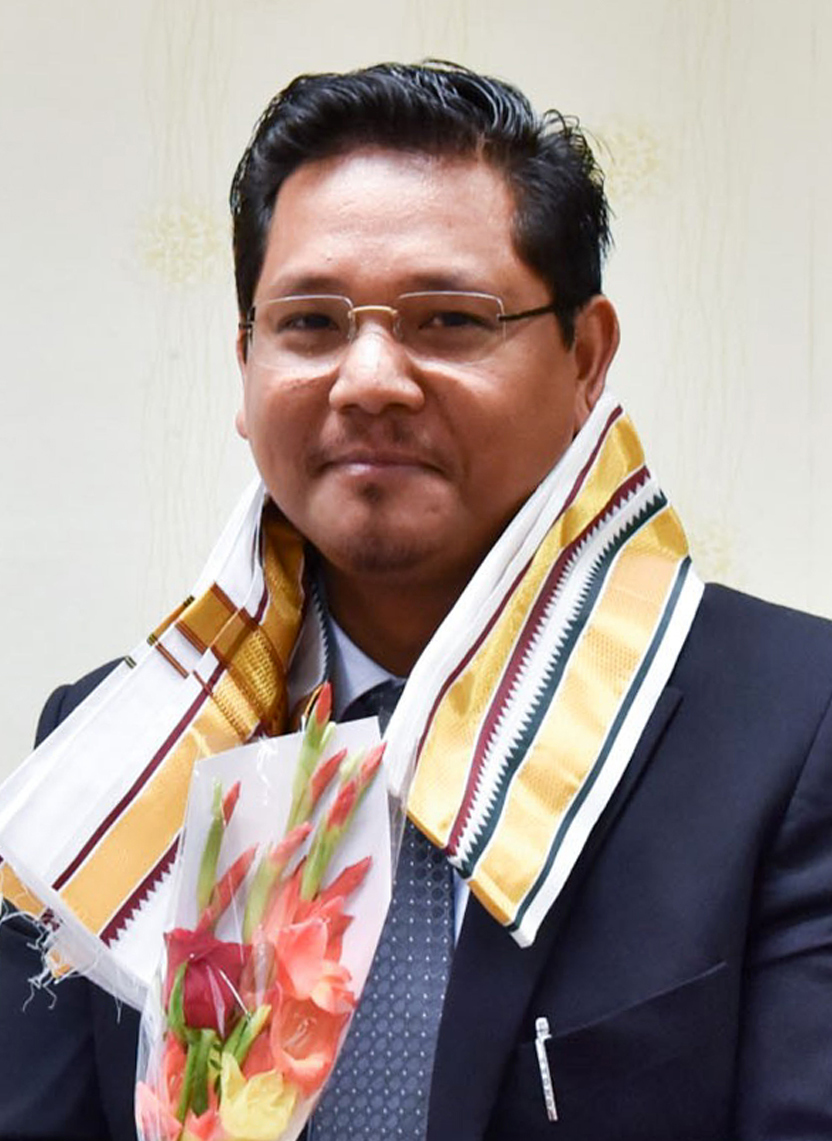
- Conrad Sangma; Hon'ble Chief Minister of Meghalaya
- Date formed: March 2018
- Date dissolved: March 2023

People and organisations
- Head of state: Governor; Phagu Chauhan
- Head of government: Conrad Sangma
- No. of ministers: 12
- Member parties: NPP; UDP; UPA; PDF; BJP; HSPDP
- Status in legislature: Coalition
- Opposition party: AITC
- Opposition leader: Mukul Sangma

History
- Election: 2018
- Legislature term: 5 years
- Predecessor: Second Mukul Sangma ministry
- Successor: Second Conrad Sangma ministry

This is a list of minister from Conrad Sangma cabinet starting from 6 March 2018. Conrad Sangma, the leader of NPP was sworn in as the Chief Minister of Meghalaya on 6 March 2018.

NPP allied with BJP, UDP, PDF, HSPDP and others and it was the first time that NPP formed the government in Meghalaya.

Here is the list of the ministers of his ministry.

== Council of Ministers ==
| S.No | Name | Constituency | Department | Party |
|---|---|---|---|---|
| 1. | Conrad Sangma; Chief Minister | South Tura | Finance.; Personnel.; Home (Political).; Cabinet Affairs.; Planning; Other departments not allocated to any Minister. | NPP |
Deputy Chief Minister
| 2. | Prestone Tynsong | Pynursla | Health & Family Welfare.; Public Works Department (Roads).; Cooperation.; Food Civil Supplies & Consumer Affairs.; Housing.; Parliamentary Affairs. | NPP |
Cabinet Ministers
| 3. | James Sangma | Dadenggre | Forests & Environment.; Information & Public Relations.; Law.; Power.; Taxation. | NPP |
| 4. | Sanbor Shullai | South Shillong | Arts & Culture.; Home (Passport).; Home (Prisons).; Animal Husbandry and Veterinary.; Labour. | BJP |
| 5. | Sniawbhalang Dhar | Nartiang | Commerce & Industries.; Transport.; Urban Affairs.; Municipal Administration. | NPP |
| 6. | Lahkmen Rymbui | Amlarem | Border Areas Development.; District Council Affairs.; Education.; Home (Police). | UDP |
| 7. | Kyrmen Shylla | Khliehriat | Revenue.; Disaster Management.; Social Welfare.; Excise. | UDP |
| 8. | Banteidor Lyngdoh | Mawkynrew | Agriculture and Farmers Welfare.; Sports & Youth Affairs.; Textiles.; Horticulture. | PDF |
| 9. | Hamletson Dohling | Mylliem | Community And Rural Development.; Information Technology and Communication.; Soil & Water Conservation. | PDF |
| 10. | Brolding Nongsiej | Mawthadraishan | Home (Civil Defence and Home Guards).; Water Resources.; Printing And Stationery. | UDP |
| 11. | Renikton Lyngdoh | Mawkyrwat | Legal Metrology.; Public Health Engineering.; Secretariat Administration. | HSPDP |
| 12. | Dasakhiatbha Lamare | Mawhati | Public Works Department (Buildings); Fisheries.; General Administration. | NPP |

=== Former Ministers ===
| S.No | Name | Constituency | Department | Party | Reason | Reference |
|---|---|---|---|---|---|---|
| 1. | Metbah Lyngdoh | Mairang | Excise.; Registration.; Taxation Stamps.; Home (Civil Defence and Home Guards).; Tourism.; Water Resources. | UDP | Elected As Speaker Of Meghalaya Legislative Assembly | |
| 2. | Comingone Ymbon | Raliang | Public Works Department (Buildings); Fisheries.; General Administration. | NPP | Removed | |
| 3. | Samlin Malngiang | Sohiong | Public Health Engineering.; Secretariat Administration.; Legal Metrology. | HSPDP | Removed | |
| 4. | Alexander Laloo Hek | Pynthorumkhrah | Arts & Culture.; Health & Family Welfare.; Home (Passport).; Home (Prisons). | BJP | Resigned | |

== See also ==
- Government of Meghalaya
- Meghalaya Legislative Assembly
