= Second Mukul Sangma ministry =

Cabinet of Meghalaya (2013–2018)

- 23rd Ministry of Meghalaya

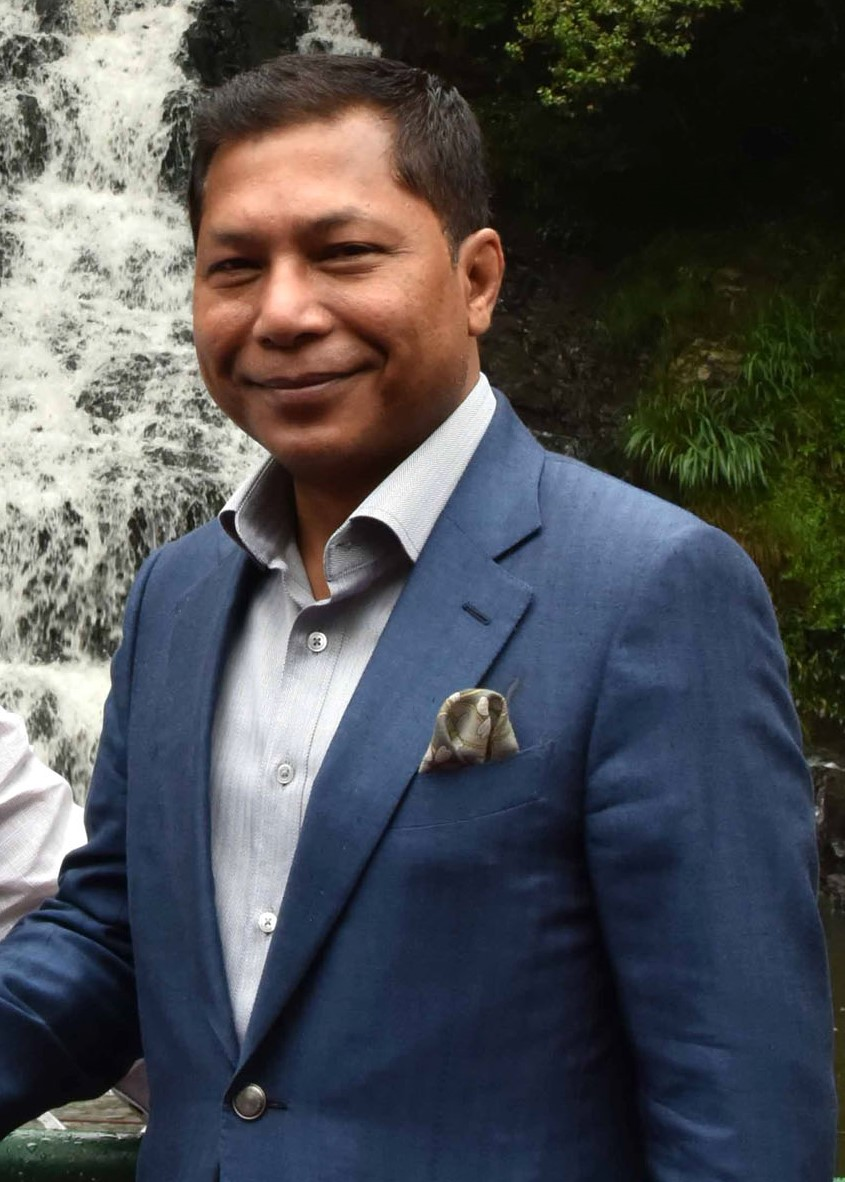
- Mukul Sangma
- Date formed: 5 March 2013
- Date dissolved: 6 March 2018

People and organisations
- Governor: R. S. Mooshahary (until 2013); Krishan Kant Paul (2013–2015); Keshari Nath Tripathi (Acting) (2015); V. Shanmuganathan (2015–2017); Banwarilal Purohit (Acting) (2017); Ganga Prasad (from 2017)
- Chief Minister: Mukul Sangma
- Deputy Chief Minister: Rowell Lyngdoh (until 2016); Roytre C. Laloo
- Member parties: Indian National Congress
- Status in legislature: Majority
- Opposition party: United Democratic Party
- Opposition leader: Donkupar Roy

History
- Election: 2013
- Outgoing election: 2018
- Legislature term: 5 years
- Predecessor: First Mukul Sangma ministry
- Successor: First Conrad Sangma ministry

The Second Mukul Sangma ministry was the council of ministers of the state of Meghalaya headed by Chief Minister Mukul Sangma. The ministry was formed on 5 March 2013 following the re-election of the Indian National Congress under the leadership of chief minister Mukul Sangma in the state assembly election. The ministry remained in effect until its dissolution on 6 March 2018 following the party's defeat in the 2018 election.

== Background ==
Mukul Sangma became the Chief Minister of Meghalaya for the first time on 20 April 2010 succeeding veteran leader D. D. Lapang following dissidence from his party colleagues. The ruling Congress emerged as the single largest party in the state election winning 29 seats. It was supported by eight independent MLAs and two MLAs belonging to the Nationalist Congress Party, following which Mukul Sangma was re-elected as the leader of the legislature party and hence the chief minister.

Sangma was sworn in as the chief minister for the second consecutive time on 5 March 2013 by Governor Ranjit Shekhar Mooshahary at the Raj Bhavan complex. On 12 March 2018, eleven ministers were inducted to the council of ministers including two deputy chief ministers and nine other of cabinet rank. Three female ministers and Mukul Sangma's younger brother, Zenith Sangma were also inducted.

== Composition ==
The council of ministers consisted of chief minister Mukul Sangma and the other ministers. On 12 March 2013, the cabinet was expanded to induct the ministers. Two deputy chief ministers, Rowell Lyngdoh and Roytre C. Laloo were appointed. The cabinet ministers included H. D. R. Lyngdoh, Prestone Tynsong, Deborah Marak, Alexander Laloo Hek, Roshan Warjri, Zenith Sangma, Ampareen Lyngdoh, Clement Marak, and Sniawbhalang Dhar. The portfolios were allocated among the ministers on 13 March 2013.

On 25 August 2016, Deputy Chief Minister Rowell Lyngdoh and Minister Alexander Laloo Hek were dropped from the cabinet while Ronnie V. Lyngdoh and Martin Danggo were appointed as ministers the following day.

The second cabinet reshuffle took place on 4 August 2017. A day prior, the chief minister dropped two ministers- Prestone Tynsong and Sniawbhalang Dhar from the council of ministers and inducted two ministers- Celestine Lyngdoh and Comingone Ymbon.

== Council of Ministers ==
Portfolio	Minister	Took office	Left office	Party
Chief Minister and also in-charge of: Department of Commerce and Industries; Department of Agriculture; Department of Planning; Department of Finance; Department of Mining and Geology; Department of Tourism; Department of Personnel; All other departments not allocated to any other Minister.	Mukul Sangma	5 March 2013	6 March 2018	INC
Deputy Chief Ministers	Rowell Lyngdoh	12 March 2013	26 August 2016	INC
Deputy Chief Ministers	Roytre C. Laloo	12 March 2013	6 March 2018	INC
Minister of Water Resources	Rowell Lyngdoh	12 March 2013	26 August 2016	INC
Minister of Soil and Water Conservation	Rowell Lyngdoh	12 March 2013	26 August 2016	INC
Minister of Soil and Water Conservation	Ronnie V. Lyngdoh	26 August 2016	6 March 2018	INC
Minister of Home Affairs (Passport)	Rowell Lyngdoh	12 March 2013	26 August 2016	INC
Minister of Home Affairs (Passport)	Roytre C. Laloo	26 August 2016	6 March 2018	INC
Minister of Law	Rowell Lyngdoh	12 March 2013	26 August 2016	INC
Minister of Law	Roshan Warjri	26 August 2016	6 March 2018	INC
Minister of Elections	Rowell Lyngdoh	12 March 2013	26 August 2016	INC
Minister of Elections	Roytre C. Laloo	26 August 2016	6 March 2018	INC
Minister of Administrative Reforms	Rowell Lyngdoh	12 March 2013	26 August 2016	INC
Minister of Administrative Reforms	Prestone Tynsong	26 August 2016	3 August 2017	INC
Minister of Administrative Reforms	Mukul Sangma	4 August 2017	6 March 2018	INC
Minister of Public Health Engineering	Roytre C. Laloo	12 March 2013	26 August 2016	INC
Minister of Public Health Engineering	Prestone Tynsong	26 August 2016	3 August 2017	INC
Minister of Public Health Engineering	Celestine Lyngdoh	4 August 2017	6 March 2018	INC
Minister of School Education and Literacy	Roytre C. Laloo	12 March 2013	26 August 2016	INC
Minister of School Education and Literacy	Deborah Marak	26 August 2016	6 March 2018	INC
Minister of Higher and Technical Education	Roytre C. Laloo	12 March 2013	26 August 2016	INC
Minister of Home Affairs (Jails)	Roshan Warjri	12 March 2013	26 August 2016	INC
Minister of Home Affairs (Jails)	Sniawbhalang Dhar	26 August 2016	3 August 2017	INC
Minister of Home Affairs (Police)	Roshan Warjri	12 March 2013	26 August 2016	INC
Minister of Home Affairs (Police)	H. D. R. Lyngdoh	26 August 2016	6 March 2018	INC
Minister of Home Affairs (Home Guards and Civil Defence)	Sniawbhalang Dhar	12 March 2013	26 August 2016	INC
Minister of Home Affairs (Home Guards and Civil Defence)	Deborah Marak	26 August 2016	6 March 2018	INC
Minister of Revenue and Disaster Management	Roytre C. Laloo	12 March 2013	6 March 2018	INC
Minister of Re-organization	Roytre C. Laloo	12 March 2013	4 August 2017	INC
Minister of Transport; Minister of General Administration Department	H. D. R. Lyngdoh	12 March 2013	6 March 2018	INC
Minister of District Council Affairs	H. D. R. Lyngdoh	12 March 2013	26 August 2016	INC
Minister of District Council Affairs	Prestone Tynsong	26 August 2016	3 August 2017	INC
Minister of District Council Affairs	Celestine Lyngdoh	4 August 2017	6 March 2018	INC
Minister of Co-operation	H. D. R. Lyngdoh	12 March 2013	26 August 2016	INC
Minister of Co-operation	Roshan Warjri	26 August 2016	4 August 2017	INC
Minister of Community and Rural Development	Prestone Tynsong	12 March 2013	26 August 2016	INC
Minister of Community and Rural Development	Sniawbhalang Dhar	26 August 2016	3 August 2017	INC
Minister of Community and Rural Development	Comingone Ymbon	4 August 2017	6 March 2018	INC
Minister of Forests and Environment	Prestone Tynsong	12 March 2013	26 August 2016	INC
Minister of Forests and Environment	Clement Marak	26 August 2016	6 March 2018	INC
Minister of Border Areas Development	Prestone Tynsong	12 March 2013	3 August 2017	INC
Minister of Border Areas Development	Celestine Lyngdoh	4 August 2017	6 March 2018	INC
Minister of Parliamentary Affairs	Prestone Tynsong	12 March 2013	26 August 2016	INC
Minister of Parliamentary Affairs	Martin Danggo	26 August 2016	6 March 2018	INC
Minister of Social Welfare	Deborah Marak	12 March 2013	26 August 2016	INC
Minister of Social Welfare	Clement Marak	26 August 2016	6 March 2018	INC
Minister of Animal Husbandry and Veterinary	Deborah Marak	12 March 2013	26 August 2016	INC
Minister of Animal Husbandry and Veterinary	H. D. R. Lyngdoh	26 August 2016	6 March 2018	INC
Minister of Printing and Stationery; Minister of Secretariat Administration Department	Deborah Marak	12 March 2013	6 March 2018	INC
Minister of Health and Family Welfare	Alexander Laloo Hek	12 March 2013	26 August 2016	INC
Minister of Health and Family Welfare	Roshan Warjri	26 August 2016	6 March 2018	INC
Minister of Information Technology; Minister of Information and Public Relations	Alexander Laloo Hek	12 March 2013	26 August 2016	INC
Minister of Information Technology; Minister of Information and Public Relations	Roshan Warjri	26 August 2016	6 March 2018	INC
Minister of Registration and Stamps	Alexander Laloo Hek	12 March 2013	26 August 2016	INC
Minister of Registration and Stamps	Martin Danggo	26 August 2016	6 March 2018	INC
Minister of Public Works Department (Buildings)	Roshan Warjri	12 March 2013	26 August 2016	INC
Minister of Public Works Department (Buildings)	Ampareen Lyngdoh	26 August 2016	6 March 2018	INC
Minister of Public Works Department (Roads)	Sniawbhalang Dhar	12 March 2013	26 August 2016	INC
Minister of Public Works Department (Roads)	Martin Danggo	26 August 2016	6 March 2018	INC
Minister of Sports and Youth Affairs; Minister of Excise; Minister of Taxation	Zenith Sangma	12 March 2013	6 March 2018	INC
Minister of Sericulture and Weaving	Zenith Sangma	12 March 2013	26 August 2016	INC
Minister of Sericulture and Weaving	Clement Marak	26 August 2016	6 March 2018	INC
Minister of Food, Civil Supplies and Consumer Affairs	Clement Marak	12 March 2013	26 August 2016	INC
Minister of Food, Civil Supplies and Consumer Affairs	Roytre C. Laloo	26 August 2016	6 March 2018	INC
Minister of Power	Clement Marak	12 March 2013	26 August 2016	INC
Minister of Power	Sniawbhalang Dhar	26 August 2016	3 August 2017	INC
Minister of Power	Comingone Ymbon	4 August 2017	6 March 2018	INC
Minister of Arts and Culture	Clement Marak	12 March 2013	26 August 2016	INC
Minister of Arts and Culture	Ronnie V. Lyngdoh	26 August 2016	6 March 2018	INC
Minister of Urban Affairs; Minister of Municipal Administration	Ampareen Lyngdoh	12 March 2013	26 August 2016	INC
Minister of Urban Affairs; Minister of Municipal Administration	Ronnie V. Lyngdoh	26 August 2016	6 March 2018	INC
Minister of Labour	Ampareen Lyngdoh	12 March 2013	6 March 2018	INC
Minister of Legal Metrology	Sniawbhalang Dhar	12 March 2013	3 August 2017	INC
Minister of Elections	Roytre C. Laloo	26 August 2016	6 March 2018	INC
Minister of Science and Technology	Roytre C. Laloo	26 August 2016	4 August 2017	INC
Minister of Housing	Zenith Sangma	26 August 2016	6 March 2018	INC

== See also ==
- Government of Meghalaya
- Meghalaya Legislative Assembly
