= Second Conrad Sangma ministry =

Indian state of Meghalaya administration

- 25th Ministry of Meghalaya

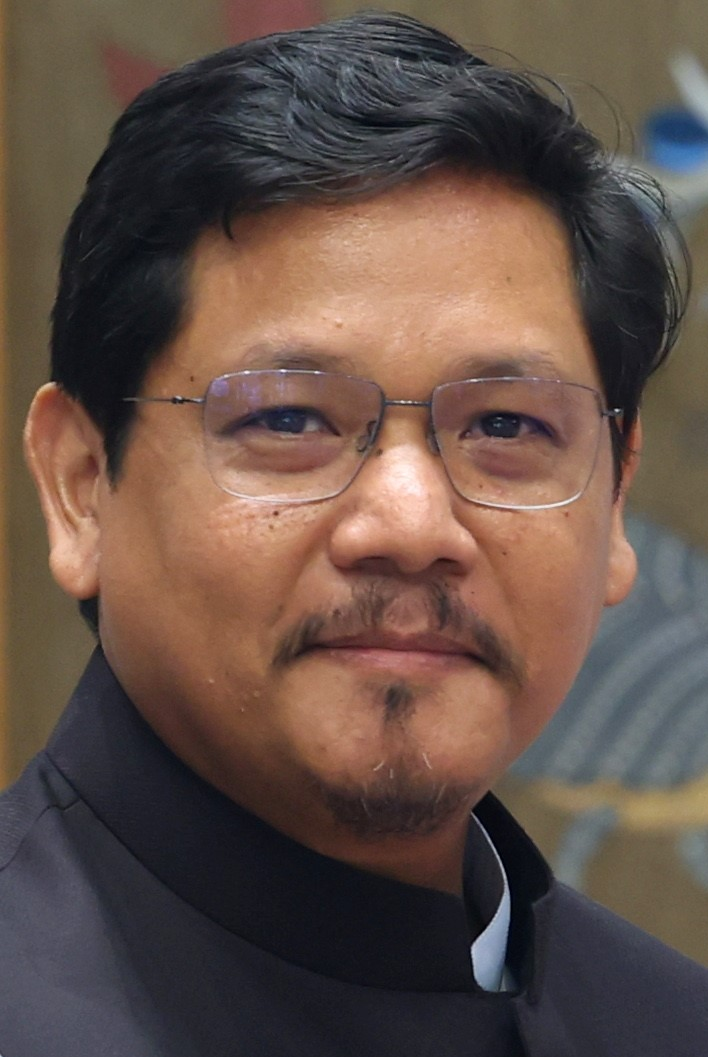
- Chief Minister, Shri Conrad Sangma
- Date formed: 7 March 2023

People and organisations
- Governor: Governor; C. H. Vijayashankar
- Chief Minister: Conrad Sangma
- Deputy Chief Minister: Prestone Tynsong; Sniawbhalang Dhar
- Member parties: NPP (7); BJP (2); UDP (1); HSPDP (1)
- Status in legislature: Coalition

History
- Election: 2023
- Legislature term: 5 years
- Predecessor: First Conrad Sangma ministry

The Second Conrad Sangma ministry is formed after the swearing-in ceremony held on 7 March 2023. Governor Phagu Chauhan took oath of Chief Minister and 11 other ministers. Conrad Sangma took oath as Chief Minister for second consecutive term and became the first to do so in electoral history of Meghalaya.

== Background ==
After the results declared of 2023 Meghalaya Legislative Assembly election, no party got majority in the house. Later BJP, HSPDP, PDF, UDP, and Independent MLAs supported NPP led Meghalaya Democratic Alliance.

With 45 MLAs, the government was formed under Conrad Sangma along with 11 ministers (7 NPP, 2 UDP, 1 each of BJP and HSPDP). Swearing ceremony was held on 7 March 2023. Prime Minister Narendra Modi, Union Home Minister Amit Shah along with Assam Chief Minister and NEDA convenor Himanta Biswa Sarma were also present in the ceremony.

== Council of Ministers ==
Portfolio	Minister	Took office	Left office	Party
Chief Minister and also in-charge of the Departments of: Cabinet Affairs; Elections; Finance; Forests and Environment; Home (Political); Information Technology and Communication; Mining and Geology; Personnel and Administrative Reforms; Planning; Investment Promotion and Sustainable Development; Programme Implementation and Evaluation; Any other department not assigned to any other Minister.	Conrad Sangma	7 March 2023	Incumbent	NPP
Deputy Chief Minister; Minister of District Council Affairs; Minister of Home (Police); Minister of Parliamentary Affairs; Minister of Public Works (Roads and Buildings)	Prestone Tynsong	7 March 2023	Incumbent	NPP
Deputy Chief Minister; Minister of Commerce and Industries; Minister of Prisons and Correctional Services; Minister of Transport; Minister of Urban Affairs	Sniawbhalang Dhar	7 March 2023	Incumbent	NPP
Minister of Housing; Minister of Public Health Engineering; Minister of Soil and Water Conservation	Marcuise Marak	7 March 2023	Incumbent	NPP
Minister of Animal Husbandry and Veterinary; Minister of Printing and Stationery	Alexander Laloo Hek	7 March 2023	16 September 2025	BJP
Minister of Animal Husbandry and Veterinary; Minister of Printing and Stationery	Sanbor Shullai	16 September 2025	Incumbent	BJP
Minister of Secretariat Administration Department	Alexander Laloo Hek	7 March 2023	16 September 2025	BJP
Minister of Secretariat Administration Department	Sosthenes Sohtun	16 September 2025	Incumbent	NPP
Minister of Fisheries	Alexander Laloo Hek	7 March 2023	16 September 2025	BJP
Minister of Fisheries	Timothy Shira	16 September 2025	Incumbent	NPP
Minister of Agriculture and Farmers' Welfare	Ampareen Lyngdoh	7 March 2023	16 September 2025	NPP
Minister of Agriculture and Farmers' Welfare	Timothy Shira	16 September 2025	Incumbent	NPP
Minister of Health and Family Welfare	Ampareen Lyngdoh	7 March 2023	16 September 2025	NPP
Minister of Health and Family Welfare	Wailadmiki Shylla	16 September 2025	Incumbent	NPP
Minister of Information and Public Relations; Minister of Law	Ampareen Lyngdoh	7 March 2023	16 September 2025	NPP
Minister of Information and Public Relations; Minister of Law	Lahkmen Rymbui	16 September 2025	Incumbent	UDP
Minister of Arts and Culture	Paul Lyngdoh	7 March 2023	16 September 2025	UDP
Minister of Arts and Culture	Sanbor Shullai	16 September 2025	Incumbent	BJP
Minister of Social Welfare	Paul Lyngdoh	7 March 2023	16 September 2025	UDP
Minister of Social Welfare	Conrad Sangma, CM	16 September 2025	Incumbent	NPP
Minister of Textiles	Paul Lyngdoh	7 March 2023	16 September 2025	UDP
Minister of Textiles	Metbah Lyngdoh	16 September 2025	Incumbent	UDP
Minister of Tourism	Paul Lyngdoh	7 March 2023	16 September 2025	UDP
Minister of Tourism	Timothy Shira	16 September 2025	Incumbent	NPP
Minister of Cooperation; Minister of Food, Civil Supplies and Consumer Affairs	Comingone Ymbon	7 March 2023	16 September 2025	NPP
Minister of Cooperation; Minister of Food, Civil Supplies and Consumer Affairs	Methodius Dkhar	16 September 2025	Incumbent	HSPDP
Minister of Water Resources	Comingone Ymbon	7 March 2023	16 September 2025	NPP
Minister of Water Resources	Metbah Lyngdoh	16 September 2025	Incumbent	UDP
Minister of Home (Civil Defence and Home Guards)	Comingone Ymbon	7 March 2023	16 September 2025	NPP
Minister of Home (Civil Defence and Home Guards)	Brening Sangma	16 September 2025	Incumbent	NPP
Minister of Community and Rural Development	Abu Taher Mondal	7 March 2023	16 September 2025	NPP
Minister of Community and Rural Development	Sosthenes Sohtun	16 September 2025	Incumbent	NPP
Minister of Power; Minister of Taxation	Abu Taher Mondal	7 March 2023	16 September 2025	NPP
Minister of Power; Minister of Taxation	Metbah Lyngdoh	16 September 2025	Incumbent	UDP
Minister of Home (Passport)	Kyrmen Shylla	7 March 2023	16 September 2025	UDP
Minister of Home (Passport)	Wailadmiki Shylla	16 September 2025	Incumbent	NPP
Minister of Legal Metrology	Kyrmen Shylla	7 March 2023	16 September 2025	UDP
Minister of Legal Metrology	Sanbor Shullai	16 September 2025	Incumbent	BJP
Minister of Excise	Kyrmen Shylla	7 March 2023	16 September 2025	UDP
Minister of Excise	Brening Sangma	16 September 2025	Incumbent	NPP
Minister of Revenue and Disaster Management	Kyrmen Shylla	7 March 2023	16 September 2025	UDP
Minister of Revenue and Disaster Management	Lahkmen Rymbui	16 September 2025	Incumbent	UDP
Minister of Education	Rakkam A Sangma	7 March 2023	16 September 2025	NPP
Minister of Education	Lahkmen Rymbui	16 September 2025	Incumbent	BJP
Minister of General Administration	Rakkam A Sangma	7 March 2023	16 September 2025	NPP
Minister of General Administration	Sosthenes Sohtun	16 September 2025	Incumbent	NPP
Minister of Border Areas Development	Rakkam A Sangma	7 March 2023	16 September 2025	NPP
Minister of Border Areas Development	Brening Sangma	16 September 2025	Incumbent	NPP
Minister of Labour, Employment and Skill; Minister of Registration and Stamps	Shakliar Warjri	7 March 2023	16 September 2025	HSPDP
Minister of Labour, Employment and Skill; Minister of Registration and Stamps	Methodius Dkhar	16 September 2025	Incumbent	HSPDP
Minister of Sports and Youth Affairs	Shakliar Warjri	7 March 2023	16 September 2025	HSPDP
Minister of Sports and Youth Affairs	Wailadmiki Shylla	16 September 2025	Incumbent	NPP

== Cabinet Spokesperson ==
No.	Minister responsible	Took office	Left office	Party
1.	Conrad Sangma	9 March 2023	Incumbent	NPP
2.	Prestone Tynsong	9 March 2023	Incumbent	NPP
3.	Ampareen Lyngdoh	9 March 2023	Incumbent	NPP
4.	Paul Lyngdoh	9 March 2023	Incumbent	NPP
5.	Marcuise N. Marak	9 March 2023	Incumbent	NPP

== Demographics of Council of Ministers ==
Representation of Ministers by district
1. East Garo Hills (8.33%)
2. South Garo Hills (8.33%)
3. West Garo Hills (16.7%)
4. East Jaintia Hills (8.33%)
5. West Jaintia Hills (16.7%)
6. East Khasi Hills (33.3%)
7. Eastern West Khasi Hills (8.33%)
Representation of Ministers by regions
1. Garo Hills (33.3%)
2. Jaintia Hills (25.0%)
3. Khasi Hills (41.7%)
Representation of Ministers by parties
1. BJP (16.7%)
2. HSPDP (8.33%)
3. NPP (66.7%)
4. UDP (8.33%)

	District	Ministers	Name of ministers
Garo Hills	East Garo Hills	1	Marcuise N. Marak
Garo Hills	North Garo Hills	-	-
Garo Hills	South Garo Hills	1	Rakkam A. Sangma
Garo Hills	South West Garo Hills	-	-
Garo Hills	West Garo Hills	2	Abu Taher Mondal; Conrad Sangma
Jaintia Hills	East Jaintia Hills	1	Kyrmen Shylla
Jaintia Hills	West Jaintia Hills	2	Comingone Ymbon; Sniawbhalang Dhar
Khasi Hills	East Khasi Hills	4	Alexander Laloo Hek; Ampareen Lyngdoh; Paul Lyngdoh; Prestone Tynsong
Khasi Hills	Eastern West Khasi Hills	1	Shakliar Warjri
Khasi Hills	Ri-Bhoi	-	-
Khasi Hills	South West Khasi Hills	-	-
Khasi Hills	West Khasi Hills	-	-
