= 2018 Meghalaya Legislative Assembly election =

Indian regional election

- 27 February 2018

All 60 seats in the Meghalaya Legislative Assembly 31 seats needed for a majority
- Turnout: 86.65% (▼1.32%)
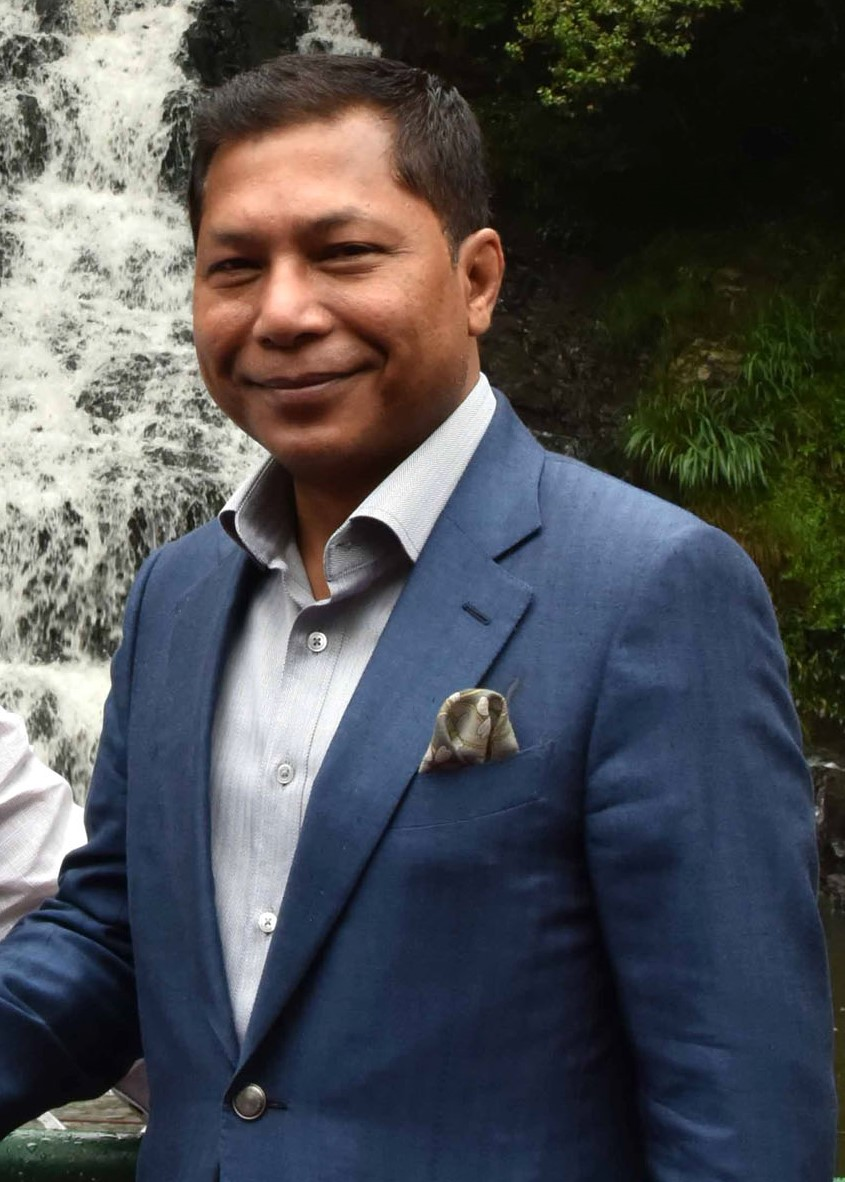

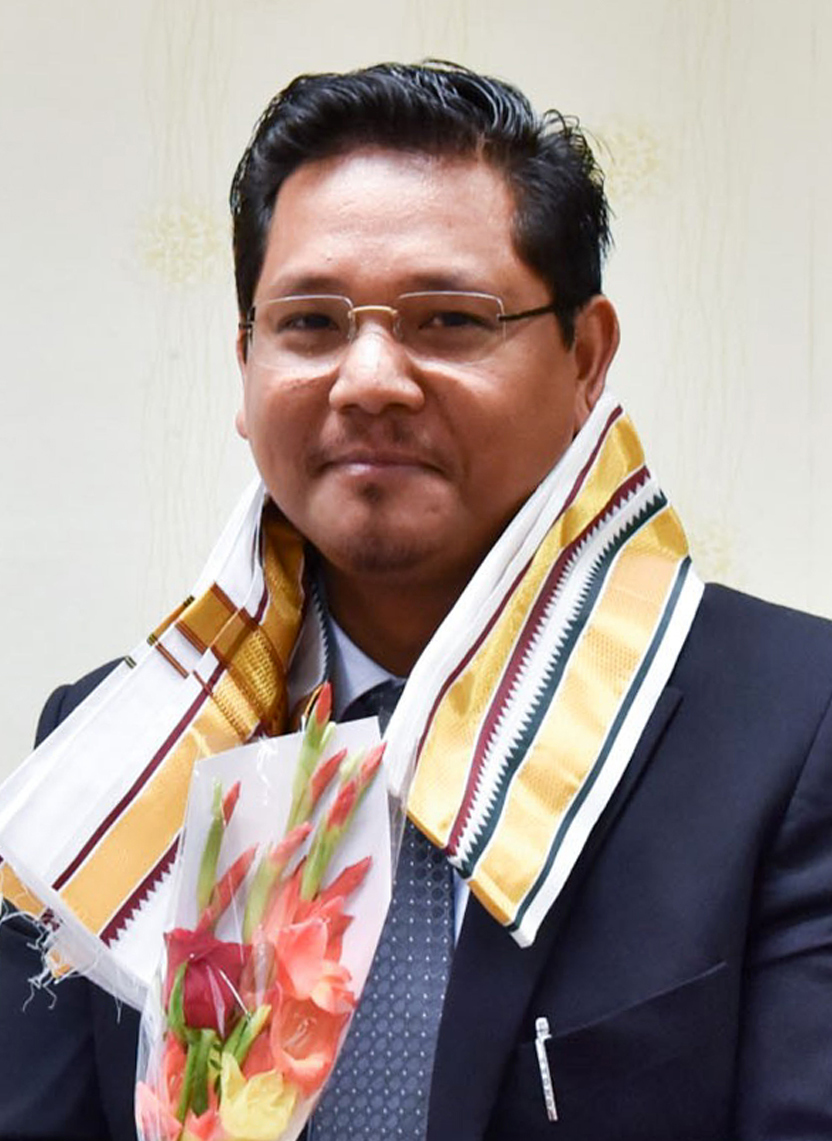
	First party	Second party
Leader	Mukul Sangma	Conrad Sangma
Party	INC	NPP
Alliance	UPA	NDA
Leader since	20 April 2010	6 January 2013
Leader's seat	Songsak (won); Ampati (won) (Note: Sangma was also elected in Ampati; he chose to represent Songsak.)	South Tura (by- elected) (Note: Elected in by-election shortly after election)
Last election	29	2
Seats won	21	20
Seat change	▼8	▲18
Popular vote	447,472	323,500
Percentage	28.5%	20.6%
Swing	▼6.3%	▲11.8%
Chief Minister before election
Mukul Sangma
INC
Elected Chief Minister
Conrad Sangma
NPP

The Meghalaya Legislative Assembly election was held on 27 February 2018 to elect 59 of 60 members to the Meghalaya Legislative Assembly, with the results declared on 3 March. The scheduled election in Williamnagar constituency was delayed to an undetermined date following the death of Nationalist Congress Party candidate Jonathone Sangma in an IED blast in East Garo Hills district on 18 February 2018. The incumbent Indian National Congress government, led by Chief Minister Mukul Sangma, attempted to win re-election for the third consecutive time but was defeated by the Meghalaya Democratic Alliance.

Meghalaya

== Background ==
=== Electoral system ===
The state of Meghalaya lies in the North-eastern region of India, predominantly populated by tribal groups. At the time of accession to the Independent India, these tribes were assured autonomy to make laws in and enforce local customs, management of land and forests. The sixth schedule of the Constitution of India provides for the establishment of autonomous District Councils to oversee these issues. As such, the powers of the state government are limited when compared with other states of India.

The Meghalaya Legislative Assembly is the legislative organ of the state. The legislature has 60 seats chosen through first-past-the-post method. The party or coalition with more than 30 seats can form the executive.

From 1976, no political party has secured an absolute majority in the state assembly, with Indian National Congress forming coalition governments.

=== Poll machinery ===
The tenure of outgoing Legislative Assembly, elected in March 2013, was set to end on 6 March 2018. A total of 370 candidates contested the polls across the 60 constituencies. Out of these, only 32 were female candidates, despite the state's distinction of being a matrilineal society.

There were 17.68 lakh voters in the state, out of which 8.93 lakh voters were female. The number of first time voters in the state was 45%.

The election commission set up 3,082 polling booths in the state, out of which 60 booths will be pink booths - one in each constituency run completely by women. There were 172 polling stations in areas adjoining the 884-km-long Assam-Meghalaya border, with polling officials having to pass through Assam to reach several booths. The home department identified 633 polling stations as vulnerable, 315 as critical and 75 as both vulnerable and critical.

Counting will take place in 13 stations to be set up across the state.

== Schedule ==
The Election Commission scheduled the election for 27 February 2018 with the results to be announced on 3 March 2018.

Event	Date	Day
Date for nominations	31 Jan 2018	Wednesday
Last date for filing nominations	7 Feb 2018	Wednesday
Date for scrutiny of nominations	8 Feb 2018	Thursday
Last date for withdrawal of candidatures	12 Feb 2018	Monday
Date of poll	27 Feb 2018	Tuesday
Date of counting	3 Mar 2018	Saturday
Date before which the election shall be completed	5 Mar 2018	Monday

== Contested Parties ==
297 candidates registered to contest the election.

Party	Symbol	Alliance	Seats contested
Indian National Congress (INC)		UPA	59
Bharatiya Janata Party (BJP)		NDA	47
National People's Party		NDA	52
United Democratic Party (UDP)		NDA	27
Hill State People's Democratic Party (HSPDP)		NDA	15
Aam Aadmi Party (AAP)			8
Garo National Council (GNC)			7
Nationalist Congress Party (NCP)			6
Khun Hynniewtrep National Awakening Movement (KHNAM)			7
People's Democratic Front (PDF)		NDA	7
Independents (IND) and other candidates			70

== Issues ==
=== Coal mining in Jaintia Hills ===
The Jaintia Hills in the eastern part of the state have rich deposits of coal. The National Green Tribunal banned rat-hole mining of coal in the state in 2014. Tribal groups across Meghalaya maintain that according to the sixth schedule of the Indian Constitution, they alone have the right to the coal under the hills. But the Coal Mines (Nationalisation) Act, 1973, which vests ownership and control of the mineral with the Indian state, expressly lists Meghalaya's coal mines as being under its purview. Besides, the Sixth Schedule also confers the right over underground minerals to the Indian state. It explicitly mentions the need for "licences or leases for the purpose of prospecting for, or extraction of, minerals". According to the Constitution, there is only one way a Sixth Schedule state can be exempted from the coal nationalisation law – by a presidential notification to that effect. Official records suggest that while the state government did express apprehension in the wake of the nationalisation of coal, it never applied for an exemption.

The state, in general turned a blind eye to the small-scale mining of coal, which had a huge impact on the ecology of the region, leading to the ban. However, numerous miners and workers were affected by the sudden decision and blame the incumbent Congress government for the failure. The Bharatiya Janata Party has promised to resolve the issue in eight months of coming to power, while the Congress government has assigned the mines to Meghalaya Mineral Development Corporation to operate the mines on behalf of the miners.

== Exit polls ==
Polling firm	Date published				
Polling firm	Date published	NPP	INC	BJP	Others
JanKiBaat-NewsX	27 January 2018	23-27	13-17	8-12	2-6
CVoter	27 January 2018	17-23	13-19	4-8	13-21

== Results ==
The elections resulted in a hung assembly with no single party or alliance getting the requisite majority of 31 seats in the Vidhan Sabha. Conrad Sangma, leader of the NPP, announced that he would form a government with the support of the UDP, BJP and other regional parties. He was sworn in as the Chief Minister, along with eleven other ministers.

Party	Popular vote			Seats		
Party	Votes	%	±pp	Contested	Won	+/−
Indian National Congress (INC)	4,52,324	28.5%	▼6.3	59	21	▼8
National People's Party (NPP)	3,33,401	20.6%	▲11.8	52	20	▲18
United Democratic Party (UDP)	183,005	11.6%	▼5.5	27	6	▼2
Independents (IND)	176079	10.8%	▲0.8		3	▼10
Bharatiya Janata Party (BJP)	152,162	9.6%	▲8.33	47	2	▲2
People's Democratic Front (PDF)	128,413	8.2%	did not contest	8	4	▲4
Hill State People's Democratic Party (HSPDP)	84,011	5.3%	▲1.13	15	2	▲1
Nationalist Congress Party (NCP)	29,287	1.6%	▼0.24	6	1	▼1
Garo National Council (GNC)	21,682	1.4%	▲0.69	7	0	▼1
Khun Hynniewtrep National Awakening Movement (KHNAM)	14,164	0.9%	▲0.17	6	1	▲1
All India Trinamool Congress (AITC)	5,544	0.4%	did not contest		0	Steady
None of the Above (NOTA)	14,915	0.9%				
Total	15,96,992	100.00		297	60	±0
Valid votes	15,96,992	99.90				
Invalid votes	1,517	0.10				
Votes cast / turnout	15,98,509	86.65				
Abstentions	2,46,285	13.35				
Registered voters	18,44,794					

== Elected members ==
The following is the list of the members elected in the Meghalaya assembly:

AC No.	Constituency	Winner			Runner-up			Margin
AC No.	Constituency	Candidate	Party	Votes	Candidate	Party	Votes	Margin
West Jaintia Hills District
1	Nartiang (ST)	Sniawbhalang Dhar	NPP	16,604	Jopthiaw Lyngdoh	INC	14,506	2,098
2	Jowai (ST)	Wailadmiki Shylla	NPP	10,657	Moonlight Pariat	UDP	9,354	1,303
3	Raliang (ST)	Comingone Ymbon	NPP	12,129	Lakhon Biam	BJP	8,879	3,250
4	Mowkaiaw (ST)	Nujorki Sungoh	UDP	6,691	Gilbert Sten	NPP	6,431	260
East Jaintia Hills District
5	Sutnga Saipung (ST)	Shitlang Pale	INC	12,257	Hopeful Bamon	NPP	10,673	1,584
6	Khliehriat (ST)	Kyrmen Shylla	UDP	20,285	Justine Dkhar	BJP	12,104	8,181
West Jaintia Hills District
7	Amlarem (ST)	Lahkmen Rymbui	UDP	14,766	Stephanson Mukhim	NPP	12,135	2,631
Ri-Bhoi District
8	Mawhati (ST)	Dasakhiatbha Lamare	NPP	6,365	Julias Kitbok Dorphang	Independent	6,161	204
9	Nongpoh (ST)	Mayralborn Syiem	INC	11,119	Rona Khymdeit	UDP	7,795	3,324
10	Jirang (ST)	Sosthenes Sohtun	NPP	9,437	Witness Day Sancley	INC	9,217	220
11	Umsning (ST)	Jason Sawkmie Mawlong	PDF	9,238	Celestine Lyngdoh	INC	9,168	70
12	Umroi (ST)	George Bankyntiewlang Lyngdoh	INC	10,405	Ngaitlang Dhar	NPP	9,387	1,018
East Khasi Hills District
13	Mawryngkneng (ST)	David A Nongrum	INC	10,336	Highlander Kharmalki	PDF	6,573	3,763
14	Pynthorumkhrah	Alexander Laloo Hek	BJP	10,166	James Ban Basaiawmoit	PDF	8,748	1,418
15	Mawlai (ST)	Process T. Sawkmie	INC	9,253	Teiborlang Pathaw	Independent	7,679	1,574
16	East Shillong (ST)	Ampareen Lyngdoh	INC	10,368	Neil Antonio War	BJP	4,294	6,074
17	North Shillong (ST)	Adelbert Nongrum	KHNAM	5,572	Antonius Lyngdoh	BJP	5,166	406
18	West Shillong	Mohendro Rapsang	INC	10,288	Paul Lyngdoh	UDP	8,304	1,984
19	South Shillong	Sanbor Shullai	BJP	11,204	Manas Chaudhuri	INC	6,107	5,097
20	Mylliem (ST)	Hamletson Dohling	PDF	8,493	Ronnie Lyngdoh	INC	8,028	465
21	Nongthymmai (ST)	Charles Pyngrope	INC	10,225	Dr. Jemino Mawthoh	UDP	9,268	957
22	Nongkrem (ST)	Lambor Malngiang	Independent	8,274	Ardent Miller Basaiawmoit	HSPDP	8,198	76
23	Sohiong (ST)	Samlin Malngiang	HSPDP	11,960	H. Donkupar Lyngdoh	INC	11,338	622
24	Mawphlang (ST)	Syntar Klas Sunn	Independent	11,162	Kennedy Cornelius Khyriem	INC	10,444	718
25	Mawsynram (ST)	Himalaya Muktan Shangpliang	INC	8,984	Pynshngainlang Syiem	PDF	8,190	794
26	Shella (ST)	Donkupar Roy	UDP	8,280	Leston Wanswett	PDF	7,910	370
27	Pynursla (ST)	Prestone Tynsong	NPP	12,807	Nehru Suting	UDP	10,233	2,574
28	Sohra (ST)	Gavin Miguel Mylliem	PDF	8,625	Titosstar Well Chyn	UDP	6,601	2,024
29	Mawkynrew (ST)	Banteidor Lyngdoh	PDF	8,519	Martle Mukhim	HSPDP	8,010	509
West Khasi Hills District
30	Mairang (ST)	Metbah Lyngdoh	UDP	10,710	Councellor Singh Wahlang	PDF	7,796	2,914
31	Mawthadraishan (ST)	Brolding Nongsiej	UDP	13,520	Biolinda Nonglait	HSPDP	11,691	1,829
32	Nongstoin (ST)	Macmillan Byrsat	NPP	9,284	Gabriel Wahlang	INC	9,224	60
33	Rambrai-Jyrngam (ST)	Kimfa Sidney Marbaniang	INC	12,135	K Phlastingwell Pangniang	HSPDP	8,332	3,803
34	Mawshynrut (ST)	Gigur Myrthong	NPP	9,540	Witting Mawsor	HSPDP	6,116	3,424
South West Khasi Hills District
35	Ranikor (ST)	Martin Danggo	INC	10,952	Pius Marwein	UDP	8,950	2,002
36	Mawkyrwat (ST)	Renikton Lyngdoh Tongkhar	HSPDP	6,777	Carnes Sohshang	INC	6,319	458
North Garo Hills District
37	Kharkutta (ST)	Rupert Momin	NPP	14,654	Cherak Watre Momin	INC	13,845	809
38	Mendipathar (ST)	Marthon Sangma	INC	9,347	Frankenstein Momin	NPP	6,670	2,677
39	Resubelpara (ST)	Timothy Shira	NPP	6,720	Salseng Marak	INC	4,957	1,763
40	Bajengdoba (ST)	Pongseng Marak	NPP	11,648	Brigady Napak Marak	INC	9,684	1,964
East Garo Hills District
41	Songsak (ST)	Dr. Mukul Sangma	INC	10,274	Nihim Shira	NPP	8,444	1,830
42	Rongjeng (ST)	Jim Sangma	NPP	4,846	Walseng Sangma	Independent	4,296	550
43	Williamnagar (ST)	Marcuise N. Marak	NPP	9,656	Sengbath R Marak	Independent	4,736	4,920
West Garo Hills District
44	Raksamgre (ST)	Benedic Marak	NPP	9,104	Limison Sangma	INC	8,480	624
45	Tikrikilla (ST)	Jimmy Sangma	INC	7,167	Rahinath Barchung	Independent	5,760	1,407
46	Phulbari	S. G. Esmatur Mominin	NPP	7,716	Abu Taher Mondal	INC	6,582	1,134
47	Rajabala	Dr. Azad Zaman	INC	7,420	Ashahel Shira	Independent	6,482	938
48	Selsella (ST)	Clement Marak	INC	12,619	Ferlin C. A. Sangma	NPP	9,022	3,597
49	Dadenggre (ST)	James Pangsang Kongkal Sangma	NPP	7,239	Rupa M. Marak	Independent	4,454	2,785
50	North Tura (ST)	Thomas Sangma	NPP	6,487	Noverfield R. Marak	INC	4,391	2,096
51	South Tura (ST)	Agatha Sangma	NPP	6,499	Billykid Sangma	BJP	4,896	1,603
52	Rangsakona (ST)	Zenith Sangma	INC	13,981	Subir Marak	NPP	12,019	1,962
South West Garo Hills District
53	Ampati (ST)	Dr. Mukul Sangma	INC	16,721	Bakul Ch. Hajong	BJP	8,617	8,104
54	Mahendraganj (ST)	Dikkanchi Shira	INC	14,292	Premananda Koch	BJP	6,207	8,085
55	Salmanpara (ST)	Winnerson D. Sangma	INC	6,613	Ian Botham. Sangma	NPP	4,698	1,915
West Garo Hills District
56	Gambegre (ST)	Saleng Sangma	NCP	7,291	Sadhiarani Sangma	INC	7,155	136
57	Dalu (ST)	Brening Sangma	NPP	4,092	Dorendro Sangma	INC	3,308	784
South Garo Hills District
58	Rongara Siju (ST)	Rakkam Sangma	NPP	8,108	Rophul Marak	Independent	7,000	1,108
59	Chokpot (ST)	Lazarus Sangma	INC	8,410	Secondson Sangma	NPP	6,359	2,051
60	Baghmara (ST)	Samuel Sangma	Independent	8,070	Sengnal Sangmaa	NPP	5,828	2,242

== Bypolls (2018-2023) ==
S.no	Date	Constituency	MLA before election	Party before election	Elected MLA	Party after election
51	23 August 2018	South Tura	Agatha Sangma	National People's Party	Conrad Sangma	National People's Party
35	23 August 2018	Ranikor	Martin Danggo	Indian National Congress	Piyus Marwein	United Democratic Party
48	11 April 2019	Selsella	Clement Marak	Indian National Congress	Ferlin C. A. Sangma	National People's Party
26	21 October 2019	Shella	Donkupar Roy	United Democratic Party	Balajied Kupar Synrem	United Democratic Party
24	30 October 2021	Mawphlang	Syntar Klas Sunn	Independent	Eugeneson Lyngdoh	United Democratic Party
13	30 October 2021	Mawryngkneng	David Nongrum	Indian National Congress	Pyniaid Sing Syiem	National People's Party
47	30 October 2021	Rajabala	Azad Zaman	Indian National Congress	MD. Abdus Saleh	National People's Party

== See also ==
- Elections in India
- 2018 elections in India
