= Jason Sawkmie Mawlong =

Indian politician

Jason Sawkmie Mawlong (born 27 October 1989) is an Indian politician from Meghalaya. He is a former member of the Meghalaya Legislative Assembly from the Umsning Assembly constituency, which is reserved for the Scheduled Tribe community, in the Ri Bhoi district, representing the People's Democratic Front (Meghalaya).

== Early life ==
Mawlong is from Umsning, Ri Bhoi district, Meghalaya. He is the son of Sunshine Sawkmie. He completed his BBM at a college affiliated with Bangalore University in 2014. He declared assets worth Rs.9 crore in 2018 and Rs.10 crore in 2023 in his affidavits to the Election Commission of India.

== Career ==
Mawlong won Umsning Assembly constituency in the 2018 Meghalaya Legislative Assembly election representing the People's Democratic Front (Meghalaya). He polled 9,238 votes and defeated his nearest rival, Celestine Lyngdoh of the Indian National Congress by 70 votes.

In January 2023, he joined the National People's Party.
