= Gigur Myrthong =

Indian politician

Gigur Myrthong (born 20 August 1975) is an Indian politician from Meghalaya. He is a former member of the Meghalaya Legislative Assembly from the Mawshynrut Assembly constituency, which is reserved for the Scheduled Tribe community, in West Khasi Hills district, representing the National People's Party.

== Early life ==
Myrthong is from Lawsohtun, Shillong, East Khasi Hills district, Meghalaya. He is the son of the late Roswelly Sohbar. He completed his Class X at St. Dominic Secondary School and passed the examinations conducted by the Meghalaya Board of School Education (MBOSE) in 1995. He declared assets worth Rs.3 crore in his affidavit to the Election Commission of India.

== Career ==
Myrthong won the Mawshynrut Assembly constituency in the 2018 Meghalaya Legislative Assembly election representing the National People's Party. He polled 9,540 votes and defeated his nearest rival, Witting Mawsor of the Hill State People's Democratic Party by 3,424 votes. He contested again on NPP ticket in the 2023 Meghalaya Legislative Assembly election and garnered 14,181 votes but lost to Methodius Dkhar of the Hill State People's Democratic party by 5,187 votes.
