= Synshar Lyngdoh Thabah =

Indian politician

Synshar Lyngdoh Thabah (born 1983) is an Indian politician from Meghalaya. He is a member of the Meghalaya Legislative Assembly from the Sohiong Assembly constituency, which is reserved for the Scheduled Tribe community, in East Khasi Hills district as a member of the Bharatiya Janata Party. He won the 2023 Meghalaya Legislative Assembly election representing the United Democratic Party.

In September 2026, Thabah participated in a prominent state-level political realignment, joining a group of eight legislators who defected from the United Democratic Party to officially merge with the Bharatiya Janata Party.

== Early life and education ==
Thabah is from Mawtap Village, Sohiong post, East Khasi Hills district, Meghalaya. He is the son of Karsing Kurbah. He completed his Master of Arts in geography in 2007 at North Eastern Hill University. Earlier, he did his BA honours in geography in 2002 at St. Edmund's College, Shillong. He is a businessman and a contractor while his wife is in government service.

== Career ==
Thabah won the Sohiong Assembly constituency representing the United Democratic Party in the 2023 Meghalaya Legislative Assembly election. He polled 16,679 votes and defeated his nearest rival, Samlin Malngiang of National People's Party, by a margin of 3,422 votes. He was among the 8 UDP mlas who joined the Bharatiya Janata Party.
