= Mawshynrut Assembly constituency =

Legislative Assembly constituency in Meghalaya State, India

Coordinates: 25.71°N 91.09°E

Mawshynrut
- Constituency No. 34 for the Meghalaya Legislative Assembly

Constituency details
- Country: India
- Region: Northeast India
- State: Meghalaya
- District: West Khasi Hills
- Lok Sabha constituency: Shillong
- Established: 2008
- Total electors: 41,064
- Reservation: ST

Member of Legislative Assembly
- 11th Meghalaya Legislative Assembly
- Incumbent Methodius Dkhar
- Party: HSPDP
- Alliance: NDA
- Elected year: 2023

Mawshynrut is one of the 60 Legislative Assembly constituencies of Meghalaya state in India. It is part of West Khasi Hills district and is reserved for candidates belonging to the Scheduled Tribes. It was created after the passing of the Delimitation of Parliamentary and Assembly constituencies, 2008 and had its first election in 2013. As of 2023, it is represented by Methodius Dkhar of the Hill State People's Democratic Party.

== Members of the Legislative Assembly ==
Election	Name	Party
2013	Witting Mawsor	Hill State People's Democratic Party
2018	Gigur Myrthong	National People's Party
2023	Methodius Dkhar	Hill State People's Democratic Party

== Election results ==
=== Assembly Election 2023 ===
2023 Meghalaya Legislative Assembly election: Mawshynrut
Party	Candidate	Votes	%	±%
HSPDP	Methodius Dkhar	19,368	52.96%	▲32.77
NPP	Gigur Myrthong	14,181	38.78%	▲7.28
AITC	Justine G. Momin	2,515	6.88%	New
BJP	Beejoy Kynter	286	0.78%	▼2.17
INC	Andrew Charles Gare	220	0.60%	▼18.69
NOTA	None of the Above	321	0.88%	▼0.20
Margin of victory		5,187	14.18%	▲2.88
Turnout		36,570	89.06%	▼0.20
Registered electors		41,064		▲21.01
HSPDP gain from NPP		Swing	▲21.46	

=== Assembly Election 2018 ===
2018 Meghalaya Legislative Assembly election: Mawshynrut
Party	Candidate	Votes	%	±%
NPP	Gigur Myrthong	9,540	31.50%	▲26.37
HSPDP	Witting Mawsor	6,116	20.19%	▼9.25
INC	Justine G Momin	5,843	19.29%	▲0.28
PDF	Morningstar Mawsor	3,925	12.96%	New
Independent	H Ledishon Nongsiang	2,484	8.20%	New
BJP	Pitosh R Sangma	895	2.95%	New
UDP	Savio Iawphniaw	740	2.44%	▼12.75
NOTA	None of the Above	326	1.08%	New
Margin of victory		3,424	11.30%	▲0.87
Turnout		30,288	89.26%	▲0.25
Registered electors		33,933		▲31.21
NPP gain from HSPDP		Swing	▲2.05	

=== Assembly Election 2013 ===
2013 Meghalaya Legislative Assembly election: Mawshynrut
Party	Candidate	Votes	%	±%
HSPDP	Witting Mawsor	6,778	29.45%	New
INC	Methodius Dkhar	4,375	19.01%	New
UDP	Fantin Kitbok Ryntathiang	3,497	15.19%	New
Independent	Pelcy Snaitang	1,870	8.12%	New
Independent	Lowis Sangma	1,772	7.70%	New
NPP	Shimbor Diengngan	1,181	5.13%	New
Independent	John Justic Hashah	1,129	4.90%	New
Margin of victory		2,403	10.44%	
Turnout		23,018	89.01%	
Registered electors		25,861		
HSPDP win (new seat)				

== See also ==
- List of constituencies of the Meghalaya Legislative Assembly
- West Khasi Hills district
