= Shakliar Warjri =

Indian politician

Cabinet Minister, Government of Meghalaya
- In office 7 March 2023 – 16 September 2025
- Governor: Phagu Chauhan
- Cabinet: Second Conrad Sangma ministry
- Chief Minister: Conrad Sangma
- Ministry and Departments: Sports and Youth Affairs; Labour; Registration and Stamps

Member of the Legislative Assembly for Mawthadraishan
- Incumbent
- Assumed office 2023
- Preceded by: Brolding Nongsiej
- Constituency: Mawthadraishan

Personal details
- Party: HSPDP
- Occupation: Politician

Shakliar Warjri is an Indian politician from Hill State People's Democratic Party (HSPDP). He is a member of the Meghalaya Legislative Assembly from Mawthadraishan.

== 2023 Meghalaya Assembly Election ==
He successfully contested the election on the HSPDP ticket. He was one of two successful HSPDP candidates.

He pledged support to the Conrad Sangma government. He was appointed as a Cabinet Minister in the Second Conrad Sangma ministry.
