= Pynthorumkhrah Assembly constituency =

Legislative Assembly constituency in Meghalaya State, India

Coordinates: 25.594°N 91.916°E

Pynthorumkhrah
- Constituency No. 14 for the Meghalaya Legislative Assembly

Constituency details
- Country: India
- Region: Northeast India
- State: Meghalaya
- District: East Khasi Hills
- Lok Sabha constituency: Shillong
- Established: 1978
- Total electors: 34,823
- Reservation: None

Member of Legislative Assembly
- 11th Meghalaya Legislative Assembly
- Incumbent Alexander Laloo Hek; Minister of Animal Husbandry & Veterinary, Fisheries, Printing & Stationery, Secretariat Administration
- Party: BJP
- Alliance: MDA
- Elected year: 2023

Pynthorumkhrah is one of the 60 Legislative Assembly constituencies of Meghalaya state in India. It is part of East Khasi Hills district and a part of Shillong (Lok Sabha constituency).

== Members of the Legislative Assembly ==
Election	Member	Party
1978	B. K. Roy	Indian National Congress
1983	B. K. Roy	Indian National Congress
1988	James Marvin Pariat	Independent politician
1993	James Marvin Pariat	Indian National Congress
1998	Alexander Laloo Hek	Bharatiya Janata Party
2003	Alexander Laloo Hek	Bharatiya Janata Party
2008	Alexander Laloo Hek	Bharatiya Janata Party
2013	Alexander Laloo Hek	Indian National Congress
2018	Alexander Laloo Hek	Bharatiya Janata Party
2023	Alexander Laloo Hek	Bharatiya Janata Party

== Election results ==
=== Assembly Election 2023 ===
2023 Meghalaya Legislative Assembly election: Pynthorumkhrah
Party	Candidate	Votes	%	±%
BJP	Alexander Laloo Hek	9,321	36.17%	▼4.95
INC	Pynshngainlang Syiem	6,783	26.32%	▲14.33
VPP	Mayborn Grace Lyngdoh	5,720	22.20%	New
NPP	Rocky Hek	3,356	13.02%	▲9.58
AITC	Raymond Basaiawmoit	247	0.96%	New
Independent	Samborlang Diengdoh	168	0.65%	New
NOTA	None of the Above	337	1.31%	▲0.15
Margin of victory		2,538	9.85%	▲4.11
Turnout		25,771	74.01%	▼5.72
Registered electors		34,823		▲12.29
BJP hold		Swing	▼4.95	

=== Assembly Election 2018 ===
2018 Meghalaya Legislative Assembly election: Pynthorumkhrah
Party	Candidate	Votes	%	±%
BJP	Alexander Laloo Hek	10,166	41.12%	▲38.76
PDF	James Ban Basaiawmoit	8,748	35.38%	New
INC	Banpynshngainlang Rumnong	2,964	11.99%	▼39.74
NCP	Predecessor Rumnong	914	3.70%	▲3.00
NPP	Probety Nongpluh	851	3.44%	New
Independent	Aneeta Synrem	238	0.96%	New
NOTA	None of the Above	287	1.16%	New
Margin of victory		1,418	5.74%	▼3.80
Turnout		24,724	79.72%	▼2.34
Registered electors		31,013		▲24.35
BJP gain from INC		Swing	▼10.61	

=== Assembly Election 2013 ===
2013 Meghalaya Legislative Assembly election: Pynthorumkhrah
Party	Candidate	Votes	%	±%
INC	Alexander Laloo Hek	10,588	51.73%	▲40.65
Independent	Process T. Sawkmie	8,637	42.20%	New
UDP	Predecessor Rumnong	617	3.01%	▲1.47
BJP	Andy Lyngwa	483	2.36%	▼60.19
NCP	Satyendra Kumar	142	0.69%	▼20.94
Margin of victory		1,951	9.53%	▼31.38
Turnout		20,467	82.06%	▲1.48
Registered electors		24,940		▼3.94
INC gain from BJP		Swing	▼10.82	

=== Assembly Election 2008 ===
2008 Meghalaya Legislative Assembly election: Pynthorumkhrah
Party	Candidate	Votes	%	±%
BJP	Alexander Laloo Hek	13,086	62.55%	▼7.40
NCP	James Marvin Pariat	4,527	21.64%	▲15.16
INC	Subhasis Chakrawarty	2,318	11.08%	▼12.49
LJP	Meristella Wahlang	667	3.19%	New
UDP	Charles Duncan Wallang	323	1.54%	New
Margin of victory		8,559	40.91%	▼5.46
Turnout		20,921	80.58%	▲25.82
Registered electors		25,963		▼7.90
BJP hold		Swing	▼7.40	

=== Assembly Election 2003 ===
2003 Meghalaya Legislative Assembly election: Pynthorumkhrah
Party	Candidate	Votes	%	±%
BJP	Alexander Laloo Hek	10,798	69.95%	▲13.08
INC	Onward L. Nongtdu	3,639	23.57%	▼15.83
NCP	Kaushik Rn. Bhattacharjee	1,000	6.48%	New
Margin of victory		7,159	46.38%	▲28.92
Turnout		15,437	54.76%	▼6.20
Registered electors		28,190		▲19.77
BJP hold		Swing		

=== Assembly Election 1998 ===
1998 Meghalaya Legislative Assembly election: Pynthorumkhrah
Party	Candidate	Votes	%	±%
BJP	Alexander Laloo Hek	8,159	56.87%	▲30.11
INC	James Marvin Pariat	5,654	39.41%	▼5.59
UDP	Robin K. Tongwah	362	2.52%	New
SP	Meena Kharkongor	92	0.64%	New
RJD	Robert Dkhar	43	0.30%	New
JD	Kolanio Lyngdoh	38	0.26%	New
Margin of victory		2,505	17.46%	▼0.78
Turnout		14,348	62.33%	▼6.48
Registered electors		23,537		▲12.16
BJP gain from INC		Swing	▲11.87	

=== Assembly Election 1993 ===
1993 Meghalaya Legislative Assembly election: Pynthorumkhrah
Party	Candidate	Votes	%	±%
INC	James Marvin Pariat	6,368	44.99%	▲15.52
BJP	Brama Prakash	3,786	26.75%	New
Independent	Alexander Laloo Hek	2,758	19.49%	New
HPU	E. Bremly Lyngdoh	680	4.80%	New
Independent	B. Massar	406	2.87%	New
CPI	Bimolendu K. Deb Roy	114	0.81%	▼1.15
Independent	Alfred Lyngdoh	21	0.15%	New
Margin of victory		2,582	18.24%	▼14.95
Turnout		14,153	69.14%	▼4.33
Registered electors		20,985		▲58.99
INC gain from Independent		Swing	▼17.67	

=== Assembly Election 1988 ===
1988 Meghalaya Legislative Assembly election: Pynthorumkhrah
Party	Candidate	Votes	%	±%
Independent	James Marvin Pariat	5,936	62.66%	New
INC	B. K. Roy	2,792	29.47%	▼7.64
HSPDP	K.L. Lyngdoh	526	5.55%	New
CPI	Dalington Dympep	185	1.95%	New
Independent	R. Jespiter Shullai	34	0.36%	New
Margin of victory		3,144	33.19%	▲20.48
Turnout		9,473	73.79%	▲7.07
Registered electors		13,199		▲5.89
Independent gain from INC		Swing	▲25.55	

=== Assembly Election 1983 ===
1983 Meghalaya Legislative Assembly election: Pynthorumkhrah
Party	Candidate	Votes	%	±%
INC	B. K. Roy	2,993	37.11%	▲8.44
Independent	James Marvin Pariat	1,968	24.40%	New
Independent	Lohit Ranjan Das	1,122	13.91%	New
Independent	Binoyendra Narayan Roy Choudhury	802	9.94%	New
Independent	Robinson K. Tongwah	786	9.75%	New
Independent	B.P. Singh	229	2.84%	New
Independent	Dal Bahadur Gurung	97	1.20%	New
Margin of victory		1,025	12.71%	▼1.51
Turnout		8,065	68.34%	▲2.64
Registered electors		12,465		▲40.83
INC hold		Swing	▲8.44	

=== Assembly Election 1978 ===
1978 Meghalaya Legislative Assembly election: Pynthorumkhrah
Party	Candidate	Votes	%	±%
INC	B. K. Roy	1,575	28.67%	New
Independent	Subhas Chandra Bhattacharjee	794	14.45%	New
CPI	Binoy K. Lahiri	786	14.31%	New
Independent	Pranesh Biswas	531	9.67%	New
HSPDP	Felbin Synrem	526	9.58%	New
Independent	G. H. Moowroh	501	9.12%	New
Independent	B. P. Singh	349	6.35%	New
Margin of victory		781	14.22%	
Turnout		5,493	63.85%	
Registered electors		8,851		
INC win (new seat)				

== See also ==
- List of constituencies of the Meghalaya Legislative Assembly
- Pynthorumkhrah
- East Khasi Hills district
- Shillong (Lok Sabha constituency)
