= Umsning Assembly constituency =

Legislative Assembly constituency in Meghalaya State, India

Coordinates: 25.75°N 91.89°E

Umsning
- Constituency No. 11 for the Meghalaya Legislative Assembly

Constituency details
- Country: India
- Region: Northeast India
- State: Meghalaya
- District: Ri Bhoi
- Lok Sabha constituency: Shillong
- Established: 2008
- Total electors: 38,958
- Reservation: ST

Member of Legislative Assembly
- 11th Meghalaya Legislative Assembly
- Incumbent Celestine Lyngdoh
- Party: NPP
- Alliance: NDA
- Elected year: 2023

Umsning is one of the 60 Legislative Assembly constituencies of Meghalaya state in India. It is part of Ri Bhoi district and is reserved for candidates belonging to the Scheduled Tribes. The constituency was established after the passing of the Delimitation of Parliamentary and Assembly constituencies order, 2008. It had its first election in 2013.

== Members of the Legislative Assembly ==
Election	Name	Party
2013	Dr. Celestine Lyngdoh	Indian National Congress
2018	Jason Sawkmie Mawlong	People's Democratic Front
2023	Dr. Celestine Lyngdoh	National People's Party

== Election results ==
=== Assembly Election 2023 ===
2023 Meghalaya Legislative Assembly election: Umsning
Party	Candidate	Votes	%	±%
INC	Dr. Celestine Lyngdoh	9,907	29.48%	▼2.95
UDP	Sunshine Makri	8,743	26.01%	▼0.23
NPP	Jason Sawkmie Mawlong	7,945	23.64%	▲21.64
VPP	Dr. Ricky A. J. Syngkon	5,456	16.23%	New
PDF	Donlang Sohkhlet	585	1.74%	▼30.94
HSPDP	Primson Makdoh	353	1.05%	New
BJP	Duruth Majaw	324	0.96%	▼2.80
NOTA	None of the Above	195	0.58%	▲0.00
Margin of victory		1,164	3.46%	▲3.22
Turnout		33,609	86.27%	▼1.64
Registered electors		38,958		▲21.15
INC gain from PDF		Swing	▼3.20	

=== Assembly Election 2018 ===
2018 Meghalaya Legislative Assembly election: Umsning
Party	Candidate	Votes	%	±%
PDF	Jason Sawkmie Mawlong	9,238	32.68%	New
INC	Celestine Lyngdoh	9,168	32.43%	▲1.13
UDP	Donkupar Sumer	7,420	26.25%	▲4.98
BJP	Lapynshngain Dame Michael Kharsyntiew	1,064	3.76%	New
NPP	Thomas Roy Mallai	565	2.00%	New
AAP	Wonderlyne Lapang	258	0.91%	New
NOTA	None of the Above	163	0.58%	New
Margin of victory		70	0.25%	▼8.91
Turnout		28,270	87.91%	▲1.92
Registered electors		32,157		▲30.43
PDF gain from INC		Swing	▲1.37	

=== Assembly Election 2013 ===
2013 Meghalaya Legislative Assembly election: Umsning
Party	Candidate	Votes	%	±%
INC	Dr. Celestine Lyngdoh	6,637	31.30%	New
Independent	Donkupar Sumer	4,695	22.14%	New
UDP	Field Marshal Mawphniang	4,509	21.27%	New
Independent	Donlang Sohkhlet	3,238	15.27%	New
Independent	Lurshai Wahlang	1,844	8.70%	New
Independent	Joberwel Lapang	174	0.82%	New
NCP	Ioannis Lyngdoh Mawlong	105	0.50%	New
Margin of victory		1,942	9.16%	
Turnout		21,202	85.99%	
Registered electors		24,655		
INC win (new seat)				

== See also ==
- List of constituencies of the Meghalaya Legislative Assembly
- Ri Bhoi district
