= Government of Meghalaya =

Indian state government

- State: Meghalaya

State Executive
- Governor: C.H. Vijayashankar
- Chief Minister: Conrad Sangma
- Deputy Chief Minister: Prestone Tynsong, Sniawbhalang Dhar

Legislative Branch
- Speaker, Meghalaya Legislative Assembly: Thomas A. Sangma

Permanent Executive
- Chief Secretary: Dr. Shakeel P Ahammed, IAS
- DGP: Shri Anurag Agarwal, IPS (acting)
- Headquarters: Shillong, Meghalaya

Judiciary
- High Court: Meghalaya High Court
- Chief Justice: Hon'ble Mrs. Justice Revati Mohite Dere
- Seat: Shillong, Meghalaya

The Government of Meghalaya, also known as the State Government of Meghalaya, is the supreme governing authority of the Indian state of Meghalaya and its 12 districts. It consists of an executive, led by the Governor of Meghalaya, a judiciary and a legislative branch.

Like other states in India, the head of state of Meghalaya is the Governor, appointed by the President of India on the advice of the Union Government. The post of governor is largely ceremonial. The Chief Minister is the head of government and is vested with most of the executive powers. Shillong is the capital of Meghalaya, and houses the Vidhan Sabha (Legislative Assembly) and the Secretariat. The Meghalaya High Court, located in Shillong, Meghalaya, exercises the jurisdiction and powers in respect of cases arising in the State of Meghalaya.

The present Meghalaya Legislative Assembly is unicameral, consisting of 60 Member of the Legislative Assembly (MLA) Its term is 5 years, unless sooner dissolved.

== Council of Ministers ==
Portfolio	Minister	Took office	Left office	Party
Chief Minister and also in-charge of: Department of Cabinet Affairs; Department of Elections; Department of Finance; Department of Forests and Environment; Department of Home (Political); Department of Information Technology and Communication; Department of Mining and Geology; Department of Personnel and Administrative Reforms; Department of Planning; Department of Investment Promotion and Sustainable Development; Department of Programme Implementation and Evaluation; And all other departments not allocated to any Minister.	Conrad Sangma	7 March 2023	Incumbent	NPP
Deputy Chief Minister; Minister of District Council Affairs; Minister of Home (Police); Minister of Parliamentary Affairs; Minister of Public Works (Roads and Buildings)	Prestone Tynsong	7 March 2023	Incumbent	NPP
Deputy Chief Minister; Minister of Commerce and Industries; Minister of Prisons and Correctional Services; Minister of Transport; Minister of Urban Affairs	Sniawbhalang Dhar	7 March 2023	Incumbent	NPP
Minister of Animal Husbandry and Veterinary; Minister of Fisheries; Minister of Printing and Stationery; Minister of Secretariat Administration Department	Alexander Laloo Hek	7 March 2023	Incumbent	BJP
Minister of Home (Passport); Minister of Legal Metrology; Minister of Revenue and Disaster Management; Minister of Excise	Kyrmen Shylla	7 March 2023	Incumbent	BJP
Minister of Arts and Culture; Minister of Social Welfare; Minister of Textiles; Minister of Tourism	Paul Lyngdoh	7 March 2023	Incumbent	UDP
Minister of Agriculture and Farmers' Welfare; Minister of Health and Family Welfare; Minister of Information and Public Relations; Minister of Law	Ampareen Lyngdoh	7 March 2023	Incumbent	NPP
Minister of Community and Rural Development; Minister of Power; Minister of Taxation	Abu Taher Mondal	7 March 2023	Incumbent	NPP
Minister of Housing; Minister of Public Health Engineering; Minister of Soil and Water Conservation	Marcuise Marak	7 March 2023	Incumbent	NPP
Minister of Border Areas Development; Minister of Education; Minister of General Administration	Rakkam A. Sangma	7 March 2023	Incumbent	NPP
Minister of Cooperation; Minister of Food, Civil Supplies and Consumer Affairs; Minister of Home (Civil Defence and Home Guards)	Comingone Ymbon	7 March 2023	Incumbent	NPP
Minister of Labour; Minister of Sports and Youth Affairs; Minister of Registration and Stamps	Shakliar Warjri	7 March 2023	Incumbent	HSPDP
