= Raliang Assembly constituency =

Constituency of the Meghalaya legislative assembly in India

Coordinates: 25.5°N 92.39°E

Raliang
- Constituency No. 3 for the Meghalaya Legislative Assembly

Constituency details
- Country: India
- Region: Northeast India
- State: Meghalaya
- District: West Jaintia Hills
- Lok Sabha constituency: Shillong
- Established: 1978
- Total electors: 39,074
- Reservation: ST

Member of Legislative Assembly
- 11th Meghalaya Legislative Assembly
- Incumbent Comingone Ymbon
- Party: NPP
- Alliance: NDA
- Elected year: 2023

Raliang is one of the 60 Legislative Assembly constituencies of Meghalaya state in India. It is part of West Jaintia Hills district and is reserved for candidates belonging to the Scheduled Tribes. It falls under Shillong Lok Sabha constituency and its current MLA is Comingone Ymbon of National People's Party.

== Members of the Legislative Assembly ==
Election	Member	Party
1978	Humphrey Hadem	Hill State People's Democratic Party
1983	Humphrey Hadem	Hill State People's Democratic Party
1988	Herbert Suchiang	Indian National Congress
1993	Mihsalan Suchiang	Hill People's Union
1998	Mishalan Suchiang	United Democratic Party
2003	Mihsalan Suchiang	United Democratic Party
2008	Comingone Ymbon	Indian National Congress
2013	Comingone Ymbon	Indian National Congress
2018	Comingone Ymbon	National People's Party
2023	Comingone Ymbon	National People's Party

== Election results ==
=== Assembly Election 2023 ===
2023 Meghalaya Legislative Assembly election: Raliang
Party	Candidate	Votes	%	±%
NPP	Comingone Ymbon	13,626	38.82%	▼0.96
BJP	Lakhon Biam	8,289	23.61%	▼5.51
UDP	J Treilang Suchiang	5,250	14.96%	▲4.90
INC	Richard Singh Lyngdoh	4,154	11.83%	▲10.70
PDF	Shemhok Garod	2,513	7.16%	New
AITC	Robinus Syngkon	1,269	3.62%	New
NOTA	None of the Above	360	1.03%	▼0.16
Margin of victory		5,337	15.20%	▲4.55
Turnout		35,101	90.75%	▼4.78
Registered electors		39,074		▲21.25
NPP hold		Swing	▼0.96	

=== Assembly Election 2018 ===
2018 Meghalaya Legislative Assembly election: Raliang
Party	Candidate	Votes	%	±%
NPP	Comingone Ymbon	12,129	39.78%	▲38.32
BJP	Lakhon Biam	8,879	29.12%	New
Independent	Richard Singh Lyngdoh	5,202	17.06%	New
UDP	Konstan Sungoh	3,065	10.05%	▼22.42
INC	Wanjop Susngi	345	1.13%	▼45.50
NOTA	None of the Above	363	1.19%	New
Margin of victory		3,250	10.66%	▼3.50
Turnout		30,490	94.61%	▲2.02
Registered electors		32,226		▲23.43
NPP gain from INC		Swing	▼6.85	

=== Assembly Election 2013 ===
2013 Meghalaya Legislative Assembly election: Raliang
Party	Candidate	Votes	%	±%
INC	Comingone Ymbon	11,272	46.63%	▼8.83
UDP	Konstan Sungoh	7,850	32.47%	▲2.42
HSPDP	Gerald D Pasi	3,579	14.81%	New
Independent	Emboklang Dhar	1,120	4.63%	New
NPP	Mihnyngkong Sutnga	353	1.46%	New
Margin of victory		3,422	14.16%	▼11.25
Turnout		24,174	92.59%	▼3.32
Registered electors		26,109		▲8.86
INC hold		Swing	▼8.83	

=== Assembly Election 2008 ===
2008 Meghalaya Legislative Assembly election: Raliang
Party	Candidate	Votes	%	±%
INC	Comingone Ymbon	12,756	55.45%	▲45.90
UDP	Mihsalan Suchiang	6,913	30.05%	▼0.35
MDP	Rita M. V. Lyngdoh	3,334	14.49%	▼4.56
Margin of victory		5,843	25.40%	▲19.84
Turnout		23,003	95.91%	▲15.64
Registered electors		23,984		▼7.61
INC gain from UDP		Swing		

=== Assembly Election 2003 ===
2003 Meghalaya Legislative Assembly election: Raliang
Party	Candidate	Votes	%	±%
UDP	Mihsalan Suchiang	6,336	30.40%	▼7.13
NCP	Wanbait Chulet	5,178	24.85%	New
MDP	Gilbert Sten	3,971	19.06%	New
HSPDP	Wikil Dhar	3,363	16.14%	▼5.27
INC	Rita M.V. Lyngdoh	1,991	9.55%	▼26.83
Margin of victory		1,158	5.56%	▲4.41
Turnout		20,839	80.27%	▼3.42
Registered electors		25,960		▲10.65
UDP hold		Swing	▼7.13	

=== Assembly Election 1998 ===
1998 Meghalaya Legislative Assembly election: Raliang
Party	Candidate	Votes	%	±%
UDP	Mishalan Suchiang	7,370	37.53%	New
INC	Herbert Suchiang	7,145	36.39%	▼13.36
HSPDP	Wanbait Chullet	4,203	21.40%	New
Independent	Bisonroy Iano	919	4.68%	New
Margin of victory		225	1.15%	▲0.65
Turnout		19,637	85.59%	▼3.91
Registered electors		23,462		▲1.66
UDP gain from HPU		Swing	▼12.72	

=== Assembly Election 1993 ===
1993 Meghalaya Legislative Assembly election: Raliang
Party	Candidate	Votes	%	±%
HPU	Mihsalan Suchiang	10,160	50.25%	▲15.46
INC	Herbert Suchiang	10,059	49.75%	▲11.03
Margin of victory		101	0.50%	▼3.44
Turnout		20,219	88.94%	▼1.96
Registered electors		23,078		▲44.02
HPU gain from INC		Swing		

=== Assembly Election 1988 ===
1988 Meghalaya Legislative Assembly election: Raliang
Party	Candidate	Votes	%	±%
INC	Herbert Suchiang	5,558	38.72%	▲38.29
HPU	Mihsalan Suchiang	4,993	34.79%	New
Independent	Hamdon Lamare	3,802	26.49%	New
Margin of victory		565	3.94%	▼6.46
Turnout		14,353	90.99%	▲13.27
Registered electors		16,024		▼7.28
INC gain from HSPDP		Swing		

=== Assembly Election 1983 ===
1983 Meghalaya Legislative Assembly election: Raliang
Party	Candidate	Votes	%	±%
HSPDP	Humphrey Hadem	5,317	40.32%	▲2.53
APHLC	Hamdon Lamare	3,946	29.92%	▲4.98
Independent	Mihsalan Suchiang	3,756	28.48%	New
Independent	Pati Lytan	111	0.84%	New
INC	N. Erickwilford Kamar	57	0.43%	▼17.67
Margin of victory		1,371	10.40%	▼2.45
Turnout		13,187	78.93%	▼2.32
Registered electors		17,283		▲26.39
HSPDP hold		Swing	▲2.53	

=== Assembly Election 1978 ===
1978 Meghalaya Legislative Assembly election: Raliang
Party	Candidate	Votes	%	±%
HSPDP	Humphrey Hadem	4,062	37.79%	New
APHLC	M. Jerveyliwin Garod	2,681	24.94%	New
Independent	Mihsalan Suchiang	2,061	19.17%	New
INC	Norendro Soungoh	1,946	18.10%	New
Margin of victory		1,381	12.85%	
Turnout		10,750	80.33%	
Registered electors		13,674		
HSPDP win (new seat)				

== See also ==
- List of constituencies of the Meghalaya Legislative Assembly
- West Jaintia Hills district
- Shillong (Lok Sabha constituency)
