= Khliehriat Assembly constituency =

Legislative Assembly constituency in Meghalaya State, India

Coordinates: 25.36°N 92.37°E

Khliehriat
- Constituency No. 6 for the Meghalaya Legislative Assembly

Constituency details
- Country: India
- Region: Northeast India
- State: Meghalaya
- District: East Jaintia Hills
- Lok Sabha constituency: Shillong
- Established: 2008
- Total electors: 46,944
- Reservation: ST

Member of Legislative Assembly
- 11th Meghalaya Legislative Assembly
- Incumbent Kyrmen Shylla
- Party: BJP
- Alliance: NDA
- Elected year: 2023

Khliehriat is one of the 60 Legislative Assembly constituencies of Meghalaya state in India. It is part of East Jaintia Hills district and is reserved for candidates belonging to the Scheduled Tribes. It falls under Shillong Lok Sabha constituency and its current MLA is Kyrmen Shylla of Bharatiya Janata Party.

== Members of the Legislative Assembly ==
The list of MLAs are given below –

| Year | Name | Party |
|---|---|---|
| 2013 | Justine Dkhar | Independent politician |
| 2018 | Kyrmen Shylla (Note: Elected as United Democratic Party. Switched to BJP in Sept 2026) | United Democratic Party |
| 2023 | Kyrmen Shylla | United Democratic Party |

== Election results ==
=== Assembly Election 2023 ===
2023 Meghalaya Legislative Assembly election: Khliehriat
| Party | Candidate | Votes | % | ±% |
|---|---|---|---|---|
| UDP | Kyrmen Shylla | 23,514 | 55.09% | ▼2.89 |
| NPP | Nehlang Lyngdoh | 17,908 | 41.96% | ▲37.08 |
| VPP | Damewanhi L Rymbai | 861 | 2.02% | New |
| NOTA | None of the Above | 115 | 0.27% | ▼0.07 |
| Margin of victory | | 5,606 | 13.13% | ▼10.25 |
| Turnout | | 42,680 | 90.92% | ▼0.89 |
| Registered electors | | 46,944 | | ▲23.20 |
| UDP hold | | Swing | ▼2.89 | |

=== Assembly Election 2018 ===
2018 Meghalaya Legislative Assembly election: Khliehriat
| Party | Candidate | Votes | % | ±% |
|---|---|---|---|---|
| UDP | Kyrmen Shylla | 20,285 | 57.98% | ▲48.14 |
| BJP | Justine Dkhar | 12,104 | 34.60% | New |
| NPP | Violet Lyngdoh | 1,707 | 4.88% | New |
| INC | T. S. Diolinda Dkhar | 150 | 0.43% | ▼22.50 |
| Independent | First Bornson Nongtdu | 123 | 0.35% | New |
| NOTA | None of the Above | 120 | 0.34% | New |
| Margin of victory | | 8,181 | 23.38% | ▲17.87 |
| Turnout | | 34,984 | 91.81% | ▼2.61 |
| Registered electors | | 38,105 | | ▲21.07 |
| UDP gain from Independent | | Swing | ▲21.62 | |

=== Assembly Election 2013 ===
2013 Meghalaya Legislative Assembly election: Khliehriat
| Party | Candidate | Votes | % | ±% |
|---|---|---|---|---|
| Independent | Justine Dkhar | 10,807 | 36.37% | New |
| Independent | Finelynes Bareh | 9,169 | 30.85% | New |
| INC | Amos Dkhar | 6,815 | 22.93% | New |
| UDP | Obil Kyndait | 2,926 | 9.85% | New |
| Margin of victory | | 1,638 | 5.51% | |
| Turnout | | 29,717 | 94.42% | |
| Registered electors | | 31,473 | | |
| Independent win (new seat) | | | | |

== See also ==
- List of constituencies of the Meghalaya Legislative Assembly
- Khliehriat
- East Jaintia Hills district
- Shillong (Lok Sabha constituency)
