= Methodius Dkhar =

Indian politician

Methodius Dkhar (born 1976) is an Indian politician from Meghalaya. He is a member of the Meghalaya Legislative Assembly from the Mawshynrut Assembly constituency, which is reserved for Scheduled Tribe community, in West Khasi Hills district. He won the 2023 Meghalaya Legislative Assembly election representing the Hill State People's Democratic Party.

== Early life and education ==
Dkhar is from Tynrong Mawsaw village, Riangdo post, West Khasi Hills district, Meghalaya. He is the son of Phinian Thongni. He completed his MA in economics in 2002 at North Eastern Hill University, Shillong.

== Career ==
Dkhar won the Mawshynrut Assembly constituency representing the Hill State People's Democratic Party in the 2023 Meghalaya Legislative Assembly election. He polled 19,368 votes and defeated his nearest rival, Gigur Myrthong of the Nationalist People's Party, by a margin of 5.187 votes. In September 2024, his MLA office in Laitumkhrah area was set on fire, allegedly by his own party members, as Dkhar, along with other HSPDP members, supported the NPP Bharatiya Janata Party alliance.
