= Marcuise Marak =

Indian politician (born 1968)

Marcuise N. Marak (born 3 April 1968) is an Indian politician from Meghalaya. He is a member of the Meghalaya Legislative Assembly from the Williamnagar Assembly constituency, which is reserved for Scheduled Tribe community, in East Garo Hills district. He was first elected in the 2023 Meghalaya Legislative Assembly election representing the National People's Party (India). He is serving as Minister of Housing Department, Public Health Engineering Department and Soil & Water Conservation Department in the Conrad Sangma ministry since 7 March 2023.

== Early life and education ==
Marak is from Balsrigittim, Williamnagar, East Garo Hills district, Meghalaya. He is the son of late late Subendra Marak. He studied Class 12 and passed the Pre-University examinations in 1991 at Tura Government College which is affiliated with North Eastern Hill University. His wife is a government school teacher.

== Career ==
Marak won the Williamnagar Assembly constituency, representing National People's Party (India) in the 2023 Meghalaya Legislative Assembly election. He polled 10,976 votes and defeated his nearest rival, Deborah C. Marak of the Indian National Congress, by a margin of 3,843 votes.
