= Deborah Marak =

Indian politician

Working President, Meghalya Pradesh Congress Committee
- Incumbent
- Assumed office 17 August 2026
- President: Vincent H Pala

Member of Meghalaya Legislative Assembly
- In office 7 March 2013 – 2017
- Succeeded by: Marcuise Marak
- Constituency: Williamnagar

Personal details
- Born: 1965 ( 60 years old )
- Party: Indian National Congress

Deborah Marak is an Indian National Congress activist who served as a member of Meghalaya Legislative Assembly from Williamnagar constituency from 2013 to 2017. She won the seat in the 2013 assembly elections and contested the same seat for the 2018 Meghalaya assembly elections. She was a cabinet minister in the second Mukul Sangma ministry.
