= Williamnagar Assembly constituency =

Legislative Assembly constituency in Meghalaya State, India

Williamnagar
- Constituency No. 43 for the Meghalaya Legislative Assembly

Constituency details
- Country: India
- Region: Northeast India
- State: Meghalaya
- District: East Garo Hills
- Lok Sabha constituency: Tura
- Established: 2008
- Total electors: 37,359
- Reservation: ST

Member of Legislative Assembly
- 11th Meghalaya Legislative Assembly
- Incumbent Marcuise Marak
- Party: NPP
- Alliance: NDA
- Elected year: 2023

Williamnagar is one of the 60 assembly constituencies of Meghalaya, a north east state of India. This constituency falls under Tura Lok Sabha constituency. It is part of the East Garo Hills district and is reserved for candidates belonging to the Scheduled Tribes. The current MLA from this constituency is Marcuise Marak of National People's Party.

== Members of the Legislative Assembly ==
| Election | Member | Party |
|---|---|---|
| 2013 | Deborah C Marak | Indian National Congress |
| 2018 | Marcuise N Marak | National People's Party |
| 2023 | Marcuise N Marak | National People's Party |

== Election results ==
=== Assembly Election 2023 ===
2023 Meghalaya Legislative Assembly election: Williamnagar
| Party | Candidate | Votes | % | ±% |
|---|---|---|---|---|
| NPP | Marcuise N Marak | 10,976 | 37.35% | ▼0.66 |
| INC | Deborah C. Marak | 7,133 | 24.28% | ▲6.35 |
| Independent | Rudreswar Ch. Momin | 5,137 | 17.48% | New |
| AITC | Alphonsush R. Marak | 4,809 | 16.37% | New |
| JD(U) | Robinus T Sangma | 733 | 2.49% | New |
| BJP | Raknang Ch. Momin | 457 | 1.56% | ▼1.87 |
| NOTA | None of the Above | 366 | 1.25% | ▲0.15 |
| Margin of victory | | 3,843 | 13.08% | ▼6.29 |
| Turnout | | 29,383 | 78.65% | ▲0.12 |
| Registered electors | | 37,359 | | ▲15.50 |
| NPP hold | | Swing | ▼0.66 | |

=== Assembly Election 2018 ===
2018 Meghalaya Legislative Assembly election: Williamnagar
| Party | Candidate | Votes | % | ±% |
|---|---|---|---|---|
| NPP | Marcuise N Marak | 9,656 | 38.02% | ▲15.86 |
| Independent | Sengbath R Marak | 4,736 | 18.65% | New |
| INC | Deborah C. Marak | 4,554 | 17.93% | ▼21.08 |
| NCP | Krinilla R Marak | 4,040 | 15.91% | New |
| BJP | Santosh R. Marak | 870 | 3.43% | New |
| Independent | Lahatson N Marak | 512 | 2.02% | New |
| UDP | Mahamsing M. Sangma | 511 | 2.01% | ▼11.17 |
| NOTA | None of the Above | 279 | 1.10% | New |
| Margin of victory | | 4,920 | 19.37% | ▲6.01 |
| Turnout | | 25,400 | 78.53% | ▼2.17 |
| Registered electors | | 32,345 | | ▲21.20 |
| NPP gain from INC | | Swing | ▼1.00 | |

=== Assembly Election 2013 ===
2013 Meghalaya Legislative Assembly election: Williamnagar
| Party | Candidate | Votes | % | ±% |
|---|---|---|---|---|
| INC | Deborah C Marak | 8,402 | 39.01% | New |
| Independent | Jonathone N Sangma | 5,525 | 25.65% | New |
| NPP | Marcuise N Marak | 4,771 | 22.15% | New |
| UDP | Santosh R Marak | 2,839 | 13.18% | New |
| Margin of victory | | 2,877 | 13.36% | |
| Turnout | | 21,537 | 80.70% | |
| Registered electors | | 26,687 | | |
| INC win (new seat) | | | | |

== See also ==
- List of constituencies of the Meghalaya Legislative Assembly
- Williamnagar
- East Garo Hills district
