= List of deputy chief ministers of Meghalaya =

Meghalaya's cabinet post

The deputy chief minister of Meghalaya is a member of the Cabinet of Meghalaya Government in the Government of Meghalaya. Not a constitutional office, it seldom carries any specific powers. In the parliamentary system of government, the chief minister is treated as the "first among equals" in the cabinet; the position of deputy chief minister is used to bring political stability and strength within a coalition government. The position of deputy chief minister is not explicitly defined or mentioned in the Constitution of India. However, the Supreme Court of India has stated that the appointment of deputy chief ministers is not unconstitutional. The court has clarified that a deputy chief minister, for all practical purposes, remains a minister in the council of ministers headed by the chief minister and does not draw a higher salary or perks compared to other ministers.During the absence of the chief minister, the deputy-chief minister may chair cabinet meetings and lead the assembly majority. Various deputy chief ministers have also taken the oath of secrecy in line with the one that chief minister takes. This oath has also sparked controversies.

== List of deputy chief ministers ==
| # | Portrait | Minister | Term of office | | | Political party | Chief Minister |
| # | Portrait | Minister | Took Office | Left Office | Tenure | Political party | Chief Minister |
|---|---|---|---|---|---|---|---|
| 1. | | Standlington D. Khongwir | 1978 | 1983 | 5 years | HSPDP | Darwin Diengdoh Pugh; B. B. Lyngdoh; Williamson A. Sangma |
| 2. | | D. D. Lapang | 27 February 1998 | 10 March 1998 | 11 days | INC | S. C. Marak |
| 3. | | Lotsing Sangma | 15 November 2001 | 4 March 2003 | 1 year, 109 days | NCP | E. K. Mawlong; Flinder Anderson Khonglam |
| (2). | | D. D. Lapang | 7 December 2001 | 4 March 2003 | 1 year, 87 days | INC | Flinder Anderson Khonglam |
| 4. | | Mukul Sangma | 11 April 2005 | 6 October 2005 | 178 days | INC | D. D. Lapang |
| 5. | | Deborah Marak | 15 May 2006 | 15 June 2006 | 1 month | INC | D. D. Lapang |
| (4). | | Mukul Sangma | 11 March 2007 | 4 March 2008 | 359 days | INC | D. D. Lapang |
| 6. | | Hopingstone Lyngdoh | 20 March 2008 | 19 March 2009 | 364 days | HSPDP | Donkupar Roy |
| 7. | | Timothy Shira | 20 March 2008 | 19 March 2009 | 364 days | NCP | Donkupar Roy |
| (4). | | Mukul Sangma | 13 May 2009 | 19 April 2010 | 341 days | INC | D. D. Lapang |
| 8. | | Bindo Lanong | 20 April 2010 | 5 March 2013 | 2 years, 319 days | INC | Mukul Sangma |
| 9. | | Rowell Lyngdoh | 12 March 2013 | 26 August 2016 | 3 years, 167 days | INC | Mukul Sangma |
| 10. | | Roytre C. Laloo | 12 March 2013 | 6 March 2018 | 4 years, 359 days | INC | Mukul Sangma |
| 11. | | Prestone Tynsong | 6 March 2018 | Incumbent | 8 years, 231 days | NPP | Conrad Sangma |
| 12. | | Sniawbhalang Dhar | 7 March 2023 | Incumbent | 3 years, 230 days | NPP | Conrad Sangma |

== Oath as the state chief minister ==
The chief minister serves five years in the office. The following is the oath of the Deputy chief minister of state:

I, <Name of Chief Minister>, do swear in the name of God/solemnly affirm that I will bear true faith and allegiance to the Constitution of India as by law established, that I will uphold the sovereignty and integrity of India, that I will faithfully and conscientiously discharge my duties as a Minister for the State of () and that I will do right to all manner of people in accordance with the Constitution and the law without fear or favour, affection or ill-will.

Oath of Secrecy

"I, [Name], do swear in the name of God / solemnly affirm that I will not directly or indirectly communicate or reveal to any person or persons any matter which shall be brought under my consideration or shall become known to me as a Minister for the State of [Name of State] except as may be required for the due discharge of my duties as such Minister.

== See also ==
- List of current Indian deputy chief ministers
