= Mawthadraishan Assembly constituency =

Legislative Assembly constituency in Meghalaya State, India

Coordinates: 25.56°N 91.41°E

Mawthadraishan
- Constituency No. 31 for the Meghalaya Legislative Assembly

Constituency details
- Country: India
- Region: Northeast India
- State: Meghalaya
- District: Eastern West Khasi Hills
- Lok Sabha constituency: Shillong
- Established: 2008
- Total electors: 43,766
- Reservation: ST

Member of Legislative Assembly
- 11th Meghalaya Legislative Assembly
- Incumbent Shakliar Warjri
- Party: HSPDP
- Alliance: NDA
- Elected year: 2023

Mawthadraishan is one of the 60 Legislative Assembly constituencies of Meghalaya state in India. The constituency was created after the passing of the Delimitation of Parliamentary and Assembly constituencies, 2008. It had its first election in 2013. It is part of Eastern West Khasi Hills district and is reserved for candidates belonging to the Scheduled Tribes. As of 2023, it is represented by Shakliar Warjri of the Hill State People's Democratic Party.

== Members of the Legislative Assembly ==
Year	Member	Party
2013	Brolding Nongsiej	United Democratic Party
2018	Brolding Nongsiej	United Democratic Party
2023	Shakliar Warjri	Hill State People's Democratic Party

== Election results ==
=== Assembly Election 2023 ===
2023 Meghalaya Legislative Assembly election: Mawthadraishan
Party	Candidate	Votes	%	±%
HSPDP	Shakliar Warjri	17,366	42.96%	▲7.36
UDP	Brolding Nongsiej	15,013	37.14%	▼4.04
NPP	Biolinda L Nonglait	7,658	18.95%	New
INC	Fourteenson Lyngkhoi	260	0.64%	▼10.24
NOTA	None of the Above	316	0.78%	▲0.29
Margin of victory		2,353	5.82%	▲0.25
Turnout		40,420	92.35%	▲0.27
Registered electors		43,766		▲22.76
HSPDP gain from UDP		Swing	▲1.78	

=== Assembly Election 2018 ===
2018 Meghalaya Legislative Assembly election: Mawthadraishan
Party	Candidate	Votes	%	±%
UDP	Brolding Nongsiej	13,520	41.18%	▲11.18
HSPDP	Biolinda L Nonglait	11,691	35.61%	▲7.24
INC	Pios Kurbah	3,573	10.88%	▼9.91
PDF	Blandingstar Warjri	3,486	10.62%	New
NOTA	None of the Above	160	0.49%	New
Margin of victory		1,829	5.57%	▲3.94
Turnout		32,832	92.09%	▲1.84
Registered electors		35,653		▲23.99
UDP hold		Swing	▲11.18	

=== Assembly Election 2013 ===
2013 Meghalaya Legislative Assembly election: Mawthadraishan
Party	Candidate	Votes	%	±%
UDP	Brolding Nongsiej	7,786	30.00%	New
HSPDP	Fenella Lyngdoh Nonglait	7,362	28.37%	New
Independent	Irin Lyngdoh	5,408	20.84%	New
INC	Boldness L.Nongum	5,395	20.79%	New
Margin of victory		424	1.63%	
Turnout		25,951	90.25%	
Registered electors		28,755		
UDP win (new seat)				

== See also ==
- List of constituencies of the Meghalaya Legislative Assembly
