= Brolding Nongsiej =

Indian politician

- Constituency: Mawthadraishan Assembly constituency

Personal details
- Born: 9 June 1967 (age 59)
- Party: United Democratic Party

Brolding Nongsiej (born 9 June 1967) is an Indian politician from Meghalaya. He is a former two time member of the Meghalaya Legislative Assembly from the Mawthadraishan Assembly constituency in Eastern West Khasi Hills district representing the United Democratic Party in 2013 and 2018. He served as a minister in the Conrad Snagma Meghalaya cabinet.

== Early life ==
Nongsiej is from Mawthadraishan, Eastern West Khasi Hills district, Meghalaya. He is the son of Harup Mawlong. He studied for Secondary School Leaving Certificate and passed the examinations conducted by the Meghalaya Board of School Education in 1984. He declared assets worth Rs.10 crore in his affidavit to the Election Commission of India.

== Career ==
Nongsiej won the Mawthadraishan Assembly constituency in the 2013 Meghalaya Legislative Assembly election representing the United Democratic Party (Meghalaya). He polled 7,786 votes and defeated his nearest rival, Fenella Lyngdoh Nonglait of the Hill State People's Democratic Party, by 424 votes. He retained the seat for the UDP in the 2018 Meghalaya Legislative Assembly election where he polled 13,520 votes and beat his closest opponent, Biolinda Nonglait of the HSPDP, by 1829 votes.
