= Comingone Ymbon =

Indian politician

Cabinet Minister, Government of Meghalaya
- Incumbent
- Assumed office 7 March 2023
- Governor: Phagu Chauhan
- Cabinet: Second Conrad Sangma ministry
- Chief Minister: Conrad Sangma
- Ministry and Departments: Food Civil Supplies & Consumer Affairs; Water Resources; Home (Civil Defense and Home Guards); Cooperation
- In office 6 March 2018 – 1 October 2020
- Governor: Ganga Prasad; Tathagata Roy; Satya Pal Malik
- Cabinet: First Conrad Sangma ministry
- Chief Minister: Conrad Sangma
- Ministry and Departments: Public Works Department (Buildings); Fisheries; General Administration
- Succeeded by: Dasakhiatbha Lamare

Member of the Meghalaya Legislative Assembly
- Incumbent
- Assumed office 2008
- Preceded by: Mihsalan Suchiang
- Constituency: Raliang

Personal details
- Party: National People's Party (2018-present)
- Other political affiliations: Indian National Congress (until 2018)
- Occupation: Politician

Comingone Ymbon is an Indian politician from Meghalaya. He was elected in the Meghalaya Legislative Assembly election in 2018 from Raliang constituency as a candidate of the National People's Party. He was Minister of Fisheries, General Administration in the Conrad Sangma ministry from 2018 to 2020.
