= Samlin Malngiang =

Indian politician

Samlin Malngiang is a Hill State People's Democratic Party politician from Meghalaya. He was elected in the 2018 Meghalaya Legislative Assembly election from the Sohiong constituency as candidate of the Hill State People's Democratic Party. He was Minister of Public Health Engineering, Secretariat Administration, Legal Metrology in the First Conrad Sangma ministry from 2018 to 2020.
