= Lawsohtun =

- Census Town
- Interactive map of Lawsohtun
- Country: India
- State: Meghalaya
- District: East Khasi Hills district
- Time zone: UTC+5:30 (IST)

Lawsohtun is a census town situated in the East Khasi Hills district of Meghalaya, India.

== Demographics ==
According to the 2011 Indian Census the population of Lawsohtun is 8,214 of which 4,262 are males and 3,952 are females. The literacy rate of the town is 92.38 percent which higher than the Meghalaya state's average of 74.43 percent.

== Education ==
"Lawsohtun Presbyterian Lp School" is one of the school in Lawsohtun.
