= Sohiong Assembly constituency =

Legislative Assembly constituency in Meghalaya State, India

Coordinates: 25.5°N 91.71°E

Sohiong
- Constituency No. 23 for the Meghalaya Legislative Assembly

Constituency details
- Country: India
- Region: Northeast India
- State: Meghalaya
- District: East Khasi Hills
- Lok Sabha constituency: Shillong
- Established: 1978
- Total electors: 32,165
- Reservation: ST

Member of Legislative Assembly
- 11th Meghalaya Legislative Assembly
- Incumbent Synshar Lyngdoh Thabah
- Party: BJP
- Alliance: NDA
- Elected year: 2023

Sohiong is one of the 60 Legislative Assembly constituencies of Meghalaya state in India.

It is part of East Khasi Hills district and is reserved for candidates belonging to the Scheduled Tribes.

== Members of the Legislative Assembly ==
Election	Member	Party
1972	Edward Kurbah	Independent politician
1978	Medras Mylliem	Hill State People's Democratic Party
1983	Nit Shabong	Indian National Congress
1988	M. Donkupar Lyngdoh	Hill State People's Democratic Party
1993	H. Donkupar R. Lyngdoh	Hill State People's Democratic Party
1998	Rain Augustine Lyngdoh	United Democratic Party
2003	H. Donkupar R. Lyngdoh	Indian National Congress
2008	H. Donkupar R. Lyngdoh	Indian National Congress
2013	H. Donkupar R. Lyngdoh	Indian National Congress
2018	Samlin Malngiang	Hill State People's Democratic Party
2023	Synshar Lyngdoh Thabah	United Democratic Party (Note: Elected as UDP member, joined BJP in September 2026.)

== Election results ==
=== Assembly Election 2018 ===
2018 Meghalaya Legislative Assembly election: Sohiong
Party	Candidate	Votes	%	±%
HSPDP	Samlin Malngiang	11,960	45.48%	New
INC	H. Donkupar R. Lyngdoh	11,338	43.12%	▼13.41
PDF	Judah Justine Macdonald Wahlang	2,670	10.15%	New
NOTA	None of the Above	175	0.67%	New
Margin of victory		622	2.37%	▼10.68
Turnout		26,295	91.50%	▼0.45
Registered electors		28,739		▲20.91
HSPDP gain from INC		Swing	▼11.04	

=== Assembly Election 2013 ===
2013 Meghalaya Legislative Assembly election: Sohiong
Party	Candidate	Votes	%	±%
INC	H. Donkupar R. Lyngdoh	12,353	56.53%	▲18.49
UDP	Braston Kharphuli	9,501	43.47%	▲12.93
Margin of victory		2,852	13.05%	▲5.56
Turnout		21,854	91.95%	▼1.85
Registered electors		23,768		▼0.26
INC hold		Swing		

=== Assembly Election 2008 ===
2008 Meghalaya Legislative Assembly election: Sohiong
Party	Candidate	Votes	%	±%
INC	H. Donkupar R. Lyngdoh	8,500	38.03%	▼14.83
UDP	Rain Augustine Lyngdoh	6,827	30.55%	▼9.50
LJP	Clement Mawlong	2,689	12.03%	New
KHNAM	Robert F Kharbuki	2,011	9.00%	▲5.14
NCP	Forward Lyngdoh Mawlong	1,976	8.84%	▲7.72
MDP	T. H. S. Bonney	182	0.81%	New
BJP	Nit Shabong	165	0.74%	New
Margin of victory		1,673	7.49%	▼5.34
Turnout		22,350	93.79%	▲20.83
Registered electors		23,829		▼3.43
INC hold		Swing	▼14.83	

=== Assembly Election 2003 ===
2003 Meghalaya Legislative Assembly election: Sohiong
Party	Candidate	Votes	%	±%
INC	H. Donkupar R. Lyngdoh	9,518	52.87%	▲7.27
UDP	Rain Augustine Lyngdoh	7,209	40.04%	▼7.48
KHNAM	Mebansan Lyndem	695	3.86%	New
HSPDP	H.Brostarwell Lyngdoh	259	1.44%	▼4.44
NCP	Losterfield Kharbuki	202	1.12%	New
Independent	Nit Shabong	121	0.67%	New
Margin of victory		2,309	12.82%	▲10.90
Turnout		18,004	72.96%	▼5.31
Registered electors		24,675		▲7.90
INC gain from UDP		Swing	▲5.35	

=== Assembly Election 1998 ===
1998 Meghalaya Legislative Assembly election: Sohiong
Party	Candidate	Votes	%	±%
UDP	Rain Augustine Lyngdoh	8,506	47.52%	New
INC	H. Donkupar R. Lyngdoh	8,162	45.60%	▲7.48
HSPDP	Nit Shabong	1,052	5.88%	▼50.89
CPI	Insee Allthings Marbaniang	180	1.01%	New
Margin of victory		344	1.92%	▼16.73
Turnout		17,900	80.77%	▼3.32
Registered electors		22,869		▲4.89
UDP gain from HSPDP		Swing	▼9.24	

=== Assembly Election 1993 ===
1993 Meghalaya Legislative Assembly election: Sohiong
Party	Candidate	Votes	%	±%
HSPDP	H. Donkupar R. Lyngdoh	10,097	56.76%	▲8.46
INC	Rain Augustine Lyngdoh	6,780	38.12%	▲5.34
AHL(AM)	Lapphang Jana	911	5.12%	New
Margin of victory		3,317	18.65%	▲3.12
Turnout		17,788	83.52%	▲1.15
Registered electors		21,802		▲38.07
HSPDP hold		Swing		

=== Assembly Election 1988 ===
1988 Meghalaya Legislative Assembly election: Sohiong
Party	Candidate	Votes	%	±%
HSPDP	M. Donkupar Lyngdoh	6,135	48.30%	▲17.72
INC	Nit Shabong	4,163	32.77%	▼9.61
Independent	T. Grosswell Kharjana	1,311	10.32%	New
HPU	Medras Mylliem	1,002	7.89%	New
PDC	A.B.Diengdoh	91	0.72%	▼1.38
Margin of victory		1,972	15.53%	▲3.72
Turnout		12,702	83.29%	▲16.10
Registered electors		15,790		▲20.89
HSPDP gain from INC		Swing	▲5.92	

=== Assembly Election 1983 ===
1983 Meghalaya Legislative Assembly election: Sohiong
Party	Candidate	Votes	%	±%
INC	Nit Shabong	3,562	42.38%	▲22.40
HSPDP	Medras Mylliem	2,570	30.58%	▼7.09
APHLC	T. Grosswell Kharjana	2,097	24.95%	New
PDC	Protersius Nongbet	176	2.09%	New
Margin of victory		992	11.80%	▲5.60
Turnout		8,405	68.14%	▲2.76
Registered electors		13,062		▲8.73
INC gain from HSPDP		Swing	▲4.71	

=== Assembly Election 1978 ===
1978 Meghalaya Legislative Assembly election: Sohiong
Party	Candidate	Votes	%	±%
HSPDP	Medras Mylliem	2,787	37.67%	New
Independent	Nit Shabong	2,328	31.46%	New
INC	Edward Kurbah	1,478	19.98%	New
Independent	Diengdoh A. B.	806	10.89%	New
Margin of victory		459	6.20%	▼5.59
Turnout		7,399	64.10%	▲2.21
Registered electors		12,013		▲60.84
HSPDP gain from Independent		Swing	▲3.94	

=== Assembly Election 1972 ===
1972 Meghalaya Legislative Assembly election: Sohiong
Party	Candidate	Votes	%	±%
Independent	Edward Kurbah	1,496	33.73%	New
Independent	S. Lonaik Marbaniang	973	21.94%	New
Independent	Collin Kharshing	734	16.55%	New
APHLC	R. Lamlin Lyngdoh	661	14.90%	New
Independent	Jing Nellson Ryntathiang	508	11.45%	New
Independent	Menister Jana	63	1.42%	New
Margin of victory		523	11.79%	
Turnout		4,435	61.84%	
Registered electors		7,469		
Independent win (new seat)				

== See also ==
- List of constituencies of the Meghalaya Legislative Assembly
- East Khasi Hills district
