= Meghalaya Democratic Alliance =

Meghalaya Democratic Alliance may refer to:

- Meghalaya Democratic Alliance (2003–2008), a coalition of political parties that formed the Government in the state of Meghalaya, India, after the 2003 Legislative Assembly election
- Meghalaya Democratic Alliance (2018–present), a state-level alliance in the Meghalaya Legislative Assembly led by National People's Party
