= Justine Dkhar =

Indian politician

Justine Dkhar is an Indian politician from the state of Meghalaya. He represented the Khliehrait constituency in the East Jaintia Hills district in the Meghalaya Legislative Assembly from 2013 to 2018.
