= Alexander Laloo Hek =

Indian politician

Minister of Animal Husbandry & Veterinary, Fisheries, Printing & Stationery, Secretariat Administration
- In office 7 March 2023 – 16 September 2025
- Chief Minister: Conrad Sangma
- Succeeded by: Sanbor Shullai

Minister of Health and Family Welfare
- In office 9 March 2018 – 28 July 2021
- Chief Minister: Conrad Sangma
- Succeeded by: Sanbor Shullai
- Constituency: Pynthorumkhrah

Member of Meghalaya Legislative Assembly
- Incumbent
- Assumed office 1998
- Chief Minister: Conrad Sangma
- Constituency: Pynthorumkhrah

Leader of BJP Parliamentary Party, Meghalaya
- In office 3 March 2018 – 28 July 2021

Personal details
- Born: 1 January 1967 (age 59) Meghalaya, India
- Party: Bharatiya Janata Party (until 2012, 2018 - present)
- Other political affiliations: Indian National Congress (until 2018)
- Cabinet: Government of Meghalaya

Alexander Laloo Hek, also known as A.L. Hek, is an Indian politician from Meghalaya who served as Minister of the Indian state of Meghalaya serving in the NPP-UDP-PDF-HSPDP-BJP administration from 2018 to 2021 and from 2023 to 2025. He is the BJP MLA from the Pynthorumkhrah assembly Constituency.
