= Celestine Lyngdoh =

Indian politician

Member of the Meghalaya Legislative Assembly
- Incumbent
- Assumed office March 2023
- Preceded by: Jason Sawkmie Mawlong
- Constituency: Umsning
- In office 2013–2018
- Succeeded by: Jason Sawkmie Mawlong
- Constituency: Umsning

President of the Meghalaya Pradesh Congress Committee
- In office 30 December 2017 – 25 August 2021
- Preceded by: D. D. Lapang
- Succeeded by: Vincent H Pala

Personal details
- Born: Meghalaya, India
- Party: National People's Party

Celestine Lyngdoh is an Indian politician from Meghalaya. He serves as a member of the Meghalaya Legislative Assembly representing Umsning. He belongs to the National People's Party.
