= Kyrmen Shylla =

Indian politician (born 1988)

The Honourable Kyrmen Shylla

Member of the Legislative Assembly
- Incumbent
- Assumed office 2018
- Preceded by: Justine Dkhar
- Constituency: Khliehriat

Minister for Revenue & Disaster Management Department, Social Welfare Department, Excise, Government of Meghalaya
- Incumbent
- Assumed office 2018

Personal details
- Born: 22 November 1988 (age 37) Khliehriat, India
- Party: Bharatiya Janata Party (2026-present)
- Other political affiliations: United Democratic Party (till October 2026)
- Occupation: Politician, Businessman

Kyrmen Shylla (born 22 November 1988) is an Indian politician, businessman, and a prominent leader in the state of Meghalaya. He represents the Khliehriat in the East Jaintia Hills district as a member of the Bharatiya Janata Party.

He is the youngest minister sworn in as one of the Cabinet Ministers by the then Governor of Meghalaya, Ganga Prasad, in the NPP-led coalition of the Meghalaya Democratic Alliance (MDA) government in the state.

In September 2026, Kyrmen Shylla spearheaded a move alongside a group of eight UDP MLAs to merge into the Bharatiya Janata Party legislature party after high-profile meetings with Union Home Minister Amit Shah and Assam Chief Minister Himanta Biswa Sarma in New Delhi.

== Early life and career ==
Kyrmen Shylla is the son of Smti. Kle Shylla and Shri. Kor Sympli, former MDC of the Jaitia Hilla Autonomous District Council. Shylla has fifteen siblings. He is the sixth child of the family. Shylla is a businessman.

== Education ==
Shylla completed his Secondary School Leaving Certificate, MBOSE, from Khliehriat Higher Secondary School, Khliehriat in 2004.

== Political career ==
Kyrmen Shylla won the Assembly election from Khliehriat Constituency as a UDP candidate in the year 2018.

In 2018, Shylla contested the Khliehriat constituency as a UDP candidate, winning his first election to the state assembly. He won against Justine Dkhar of Bharatiya Janta Party with a victory margin of 8181 votes.

Shylla was elected to the Meghalaya Legislative Assembly in 2018 from the Khliehriat constituency as a candidate of the United Democratic Party.

In a major political realignment in October 2026, Kyrmen Shylla officially merged with the Bharatiya Janata Party along with seven other legislators. This mass switch from the United Democratic Party was formally recognized by the Meghalaya Legislative Assembly Speaker, dramatically scaling up the BJP's presence in the state assembly.

On October 16, 2026, Assembly Speaker Thomas A. Sangma legally recognized the merger under Paragraph 4 of the Tenth Schedule (Anti-Defection Law) since the eight defecting MLAs constituted more than two-thirds of the UDP's legislative wing. Following this move, the BJP's strength in the 60-member assembly jumped from 2 to 10 seats, cementing Shylla and his allies as key power-brokers in the state's ruling coalition.

== Positions in government ==
Kyrmen Shylla served as Minister of Revenue & Disaster Management, Social Welfare, and Excise from 2018 to 2025.

== Personal life ==
Shylla is unmarried. He expressed his desire to adopt a girl into his family, who had been abandoned at his residence in November 2019.
