= Prestone Tynsong =

Indian politician

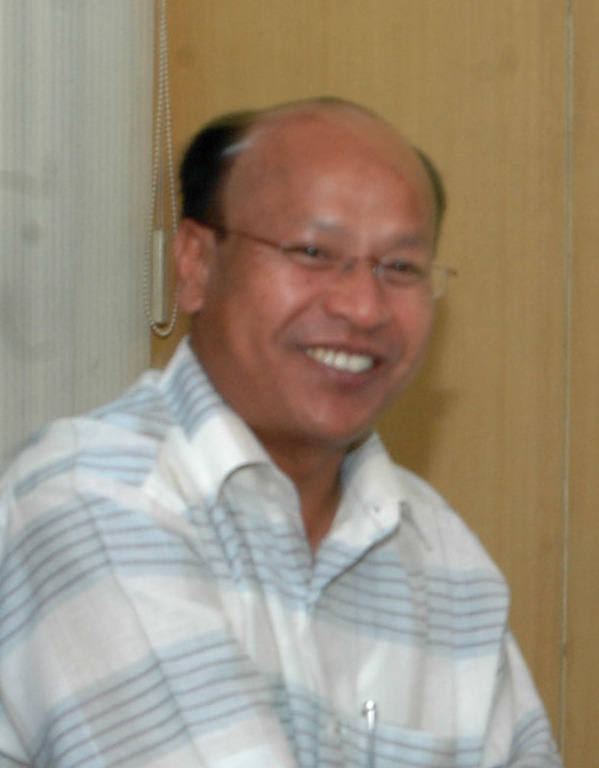

Deputy Chief Minister of Meghalaya
- Incumbent
- Assumed office 6 March 2018 serving with Sniawbhalang Dhar from 7 March 2023
- Governor: C. H. Vijayashankar (current)
- Department & Portfolios: Minister of Public Works Department (Roads), Animal Husbandry and Veterinary, Housing, Labour, Parliamentary Affairs
- Preceded by: Bindo Lagang

Member of the Meghalaya Legislative Assembly for Pynursla
- Incumbent
- Assumed office 2013

Personal details
- Born: 19 December 1965 (age 60)
- Party: National People's Party (since 2017); Indian National Congress (before 2017)
- Occupation: Politician

Prestone Tynsong is an Indian politician who has served as the Deputy Chief Minister of Meghalaya under Conrad Sangma since March 2018, serving alongside Sniawbhalang Dhar since 7 March 2023. He is also the minister of Public Works Department (Roads), Animal Husbandry, Veterinary, Housing, Labour and Parliamentary Affairs in the Government of Meghalaya since 2018. He has been a member of the National People's Party since 2017 and was a member of the Indian National Congress prior to that. Tynsong has represented the Pynursla constituency in the Meghalaya Legislative Assembly since 2013.

== Political career ==
He was elected for the Lyngkyrdem Assembly Constituency in 2003 and 2008 on the Indian National Congress ticket, before shifting his seat to Pynursla Assembly Constituency in 2013.

In 2017, he quit the Indian National Congress and joined the National People's Party.

In 2018, he became Deputy Chief Minister of Meghalaya in the Conrad Sangma-led cabinet.
