= Conrad Sangma =

12th and current Chief Minister of Meghalaya

Conrad K. Sangma
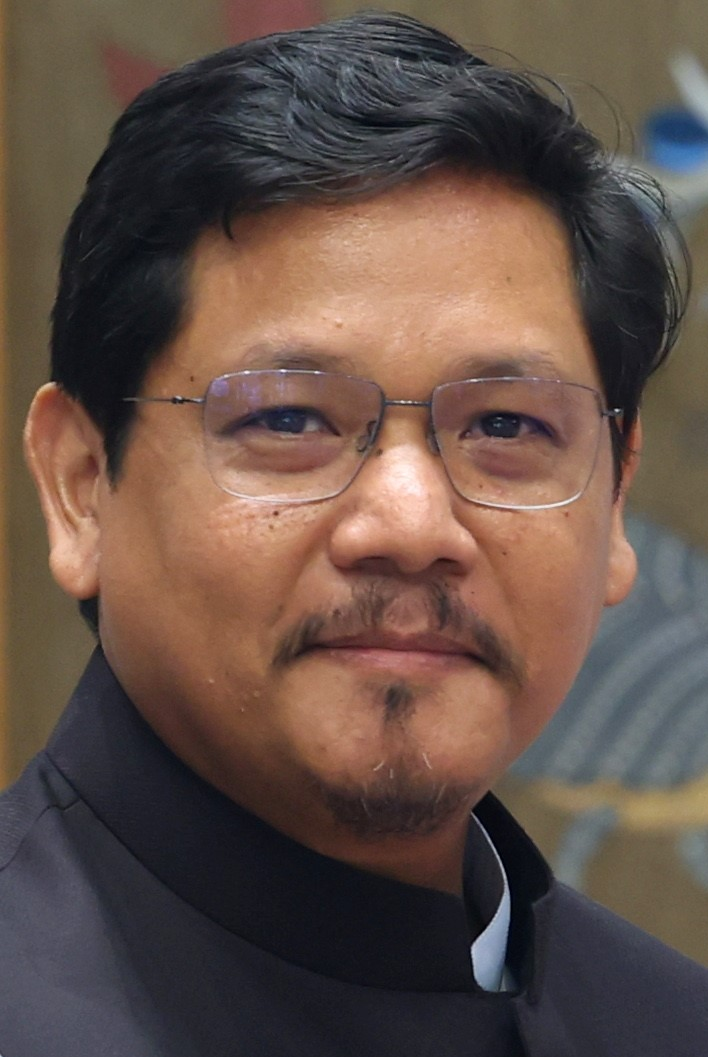
- Sangma in 2024

12th Chief Minister of Meghalaya
- Incumbent
- Assumed office 6 March 2018
- Governor: Ganga Prasad; Tathagata Roy; R. N. Ravi; Satya Pal Malik; B. D. Mishra; Phagu Chauhan; C. H. Vijayashankar
- Cabinet: First Conrad Sangma ministry (2018–2023); Second Conrad Sangma ministry (2023– )
- Deputy Chief Minister: Prestone Tynsong (since 6 March 2018); Sniawbhalang Dhar (since 7 March 2023)
- Preceded by: Mukul Sangma

Member of Meghalaya Legislative Assembly
- Incumbent
- Assumed office 27 August 2018
- Preceded by: Agatha Sangma
- Constituency: South Tura
- In office 2008–2013
- Preceded by: Clement Marak
- Succeeded by: Clement Marak
- Constituency: Selsella

Member of Parliament, Lok Sabha
- In office 19 May 2016 – 27 August 2018
- Preceded by: P. A. Sangma
- Succeeded by: Agatha Sangma
- Constituency: Tura

Minister of Finance, Power and Tourism (Government of Meghalaya)
- In office 2008–2009
- Chief Minister: Donkupar Roy

Personal details
- Born: Conrad Kongkal Sangma; 27 January 1978 (age 48) Tura, Meghalaya, India
- Party: National People's Party (From 2018) Nationalist Congress Party (Until 2018)
- Spouse: Mehtab Sangma (m. 2009)
- Children: 3
- Parent: P. A. Sangma (father)
- Relatives: James Sangma (brother); Agatha Sangma (sister); Christi Sangma (sister)
- Education: Imperial College London (MBA); Wharton School of Business (BBA)
- Occupation: Politician

Conrad Kongkal Sangma (born 27 January 1978) is an Indian politician and Chief Minister of Meghalaya since 2018. He is the national president of the National People's Party. His father, P. A. Sangma, was former Chief Minister and former Speaker of the Lok Sabha. Conrad Sangma was also a Member of Parliament from Tura (2016–2018). He has been representing the South Tura constituency since 2018 and had represented Selsella constituency from 2008 to 2013. Sangma was also Minister of Finance, Power and Tourism, Government of Meghalaya from 2008 to 2009. He has served as the Leader of the Opposition in the Meghalaya Legislative Assembly. He has also served as the National President of the Nationalist Youth Congress.

== Career ==
Upon completing his studies, Sangma started his political career in the late 1990s, as the campaign manager for his father, P. A. Sangma for the Nationalist Congress Party (NCP). He contested his first election in 2004, where he campaigned for a seat in the Garo Hills Autonomous District Council and lost by 182 votes. He was first elected to the State Assembly along with his brother James, both as NCP members in the 2008 state elections and later held several important portfolios in the state cabinet, including those of Finance, Power, Tourism, GAD and IT, and presented his first annual budget for Meghalaya within 10 days of debuting as a minister. From 2009 to 2013 Sangma held the post of Leader of Opposition in the Meghalaya Legislative Assembly. Sangma lost his seat in the 2013 Meghalaya Legislative Assembly election.

In March 2016 he was elected National President of the National People's Party (NPP) following his father's death earlier that year. In May that year, contesting from Tura in the by-election to the Lok Sabha, he won by a record margin of 1.92 lakh votes.

== Chief Minister of Meghalaya (2018-present) ==
Sangma's party, the NPP, came second behind the Indian National Congress winning 19 seats at the 2018 Meghalaya legislative assembly election. Requiring 30 seats to form a government in the State, the NPP allied with other regional parties taking the number to 34. Subsequently, Sangma staked claim to form government upon meeting the Governor of Meghalaya Ganga Prasad with a letter of support from the 34 members of the legislative assembly, that included 19 from NPP, six from the United Democratic Party, four from the People's Democratic Front, two each from the Hill State People's Democratic Party and the Bharatiya Janata Party, and an independent, and was declared the Chief Minister-elect. He was sworn in on 6 March, replacing Mukul Sangma who is not related to him. In August 2018, he contested the by-election for the South Tura seat and polled 13,656 votes after his sister Agatha Sangma vacated her seat. Sangma defeated his nearest Congress rival Charlotte W Momin by a margin of over 8,400 votes. He was elected as Meghalaya Chief Minister for the second term on 7 March 2023. Sangma's party, the NPP, became the single largest party, winning 26 seats at the 2023 Meghalaya legislative assembly election. Later 12 from UDP, 2 from BJP, 2 from HSDP and 2 independents decided to support the government.

== Personal life ==
Conrad Sangma was born on 27 January 1978 in Tura, a town in the West Garo Hills district, Meghalaya. His father Purno Sangma was a former Chief Minister of Meghalaya and Speaker of the Lok Sabha, and mother Soradini, a homemaker. His siblings, older brother James and younger sister Agatha, are politicians with the NPP. Another sister Christy, however, has remained non-political. Conrad was brought up in Delhi and was educated at the St. Columba's School there. He received a bachelor's degree in business administration in entrepreneurial management from the Wharton School of the University of Pennsylvania, before completing his MBA in finance from Imperial College London.

Sangma married Mehtab Chandee, a doctor by profession, on 29 May 2009, and they have two daughters and a son: Amara (born c. 2011), Katelyn (born 2017) and William (born 2025). Apart from politics, Sangma has been associated with social work as President of the PA Sangma Foundation, which functions for the betterment of sectors of education and environment, and also runs four colleges in rural Meghalaya. He also currently serves as President of the Meghalaya Cricket Association and Sports Academy. He, along with the Arts and Culture Minister of Meghalaya, Sanbor Shullai, released the German edition of an acclaimed book Great Minds on India by Salil Gewali of Meghalaya in 2022, which features a foreword by a NASA chief scientist Dr. Kamlesh Lulla, Houston, USA and has been translated into fifteen languages as of 2026.

Conrad Sangma plays the electric guitar and is a fan of the heavy metal band Iron Maiden. In May 2020, he received significant notice for posting a video of himself on Instagram playing the Iron Maiden song "Wasted Years".

== Notes ==
Political offices
Preceded by P. A. Sangma	Member of Parliament for Tura; 2016 – 2019	Succeeded by Agatha Sangma
Preceded by Mukul Sangma	Chief Minister of Meghalaya; 6 March 2018 – Present	Succeeded by Incumbent
