= National People's Party (India) =

Political party in India

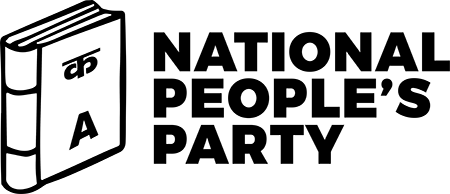
- Abbreviation: NPP
- President: Conrad Sangma
- Rajya Sabha Leader: James Sangma
- Founder: P. A. Sangma
- Founded: 6 January 2013 (13 years ago)
- Headquarters: Shillong, Meghalaya
- Student wing: National People's Students Union-NPSU
- Youth wing: National People’s Youth Front
- Women's wing: National People's Women Committee
- Ideology: Conservatism (Indian); Regionalism
- Political position: Centre-right
- ECI status: National Party
- Alliance: NDA (National); NEDA (Nagaland, Manipur and Arunachal Pradesh); MDA (Meghalaya)
- Seats in Rajya Sabha: 1 / 245
- Seats in Lok Sabha: 0 / 543
- Seats in State Legislative Assembly: 43 / 4,036 List 36 / 60 Meghalaya 6 / 60 Manipur 1 / 60 Arunachal Pradesh
- Number of states and union territories in government: 4 / 31

Election symbol
- Book

Party flag
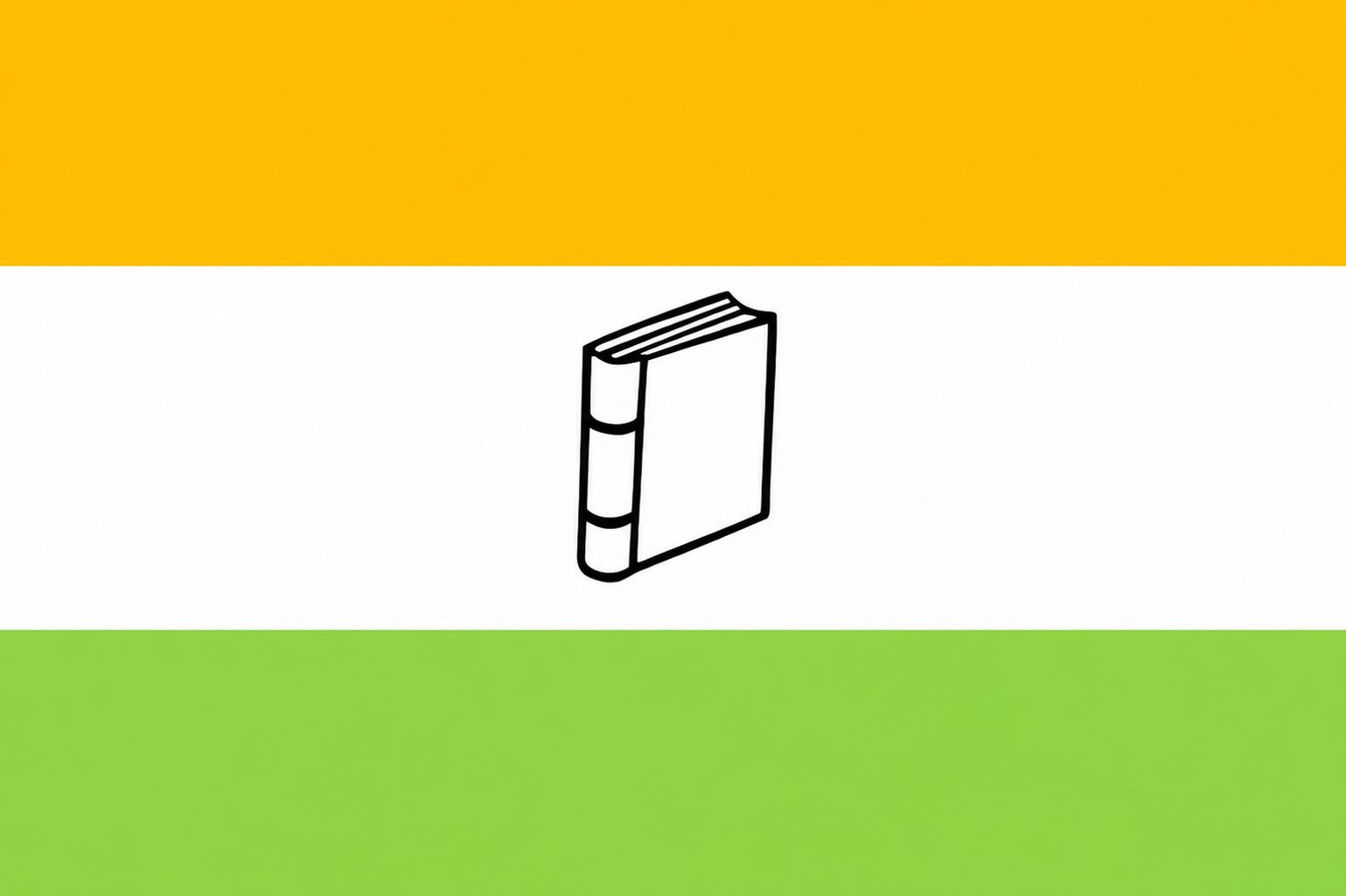

Website
- www.nppindia.in

The National People's Party (NPP) is a conservative national political party in India. It is mostly concentrated in Meghalaya. Founded by P. A. Sangma after his expulsion from the Nationalist Congress Party in July 2012, it was accorded national party status on 7 June 2019. It is the first political party from Northeast India to have attained this status.

== History ==
On 6 January 2013, Sangma launched the party at the national level. He announced an alliance with the National Democratic Alliance led by the Bharatiya Janata Party. Sangma also reiterated that though the membership of the party was open to all, it shall be a tribal-centric party.

Sangma is a nine-time Member of Parliament. In July 2012, he refused to accept the party's decision to quit the 2012 Indian presidential election.

The National People's Party had appointed Dheeraj Shukla as the District President of NPP, Jaunpur.

NPP contested the assembly election of Rajasthan in December 2013, under the leadership of Kirodi Lal Meena, a former BJP member and MP (Independent from Dausa) at the time of election and won four seats.

Currently, it is a part of North-East Democratic Alliance consisting of political parties of the northeast which has supported the National Democratic Alliance.

In 2015, in a rare move election commission suspended NPP for its failure to provide the party's expenditure during the Lok Sabha Elections held in 2014. NPP became first party to get suspended by EC.

In September 2015, the leaders of six parties — Samajwadi Party, Nationalist Congress Party, Jan Adhikar Party, Samras Samaj Party, National People's Party and Samajwadi Janata Party – announced the formation of a third front known as the Socialist Secular Morcha ahead of the 2015 Bihar Legislative Assembly election.

In May 2016, after the Bharatiya Janata Party led National Democratic Alliance formed its first government in Assam, and formed a new alliance called the North-East Democratic Alliance (NEDA) with Himanta Biswa Sarma as its convener. The chief ministers of the northeastern states of Sikkim, Assam, and Nagaland too belong to this alliance. Thus, the National People's Party joined the NEDA.

The NPP contested nine candidates in the 2017 Manipur Legislative Assembly election and won four seats.

They won 19 seats in the 2018 Meghalaya Legislative Assembly election, although the Indian National Congress emerged as the single largest party, NEDA did well in 2023 assembly elections without any pre-poll alliances. The party emerged as the single largest party and won 26 seats, and formed a government supported by BJP and other NEDA members.

On 6 May 2023, the People's Democratic Front party merged with the National People's Party.

National People's Party, West Bengal, is the state unit of the National People's Party in the Indian state of West Bengal. The party's headquarters is located in Kolkata, the capital of the state. Anish Kr Singh is currently appointed as the State President of NPP West Bengal.

== Election symbol ==
Its election symbol is a book. The significance for the same is that the party believes that only literacy and education can empower the weaker sections.

== Key Leaders ==
| Member | Portrait | Current/ Previous Position | Party Position |
|---|---|---|---|
| Conrad Sangma | | Chief Minister of Meghalaya (2018–present); MLA - South Tura (2018–present); Former MP Tura (2016–2018); Leader of Opposition, Meghalaya (2009–2013); Former MLA - Selsella (2008–2013) | National president |
| Prestone Tynsong | | Deputy Chief Minister of Meghalaya (2018 - Present); MLA - Pynursla, Meghalaya (2013 - Present) | National Vice President |
| James Sangma | | Chairman - Meghalaya Industries Development Corporation (2023–present); Former minister (2018–2023); Former MLA, Dadenggre (Vidhan Sabha constituency) (2008–2023) | National spokesperson, National General Secretary (I/C), Finance |
| Thomas A. Sangma | | Speaker - Meghalaya Legislative Assembly (2023–present); MLA - North Tura (2018–present); Former MP, Rajya Sabha (2008–2014) | National general secretary (I/C), Organisation |
| Agatha Sangma | | Member of Parliament, Lok Sabha, Tura (2019-2024);(2008–2014); Union minister of state for rural development (2009–2012) | National general secretary |

== Electoral performance ==
The party won a seat in 2014 Loksabha elections from Tura and Sangma became MP once again. After the death of P. A. Sangma in 2016, his son Conrad Sangma won a by-election held in May 2016 fo fill this seat. The party had proposed to contest election and expand its base in tribal constituencies of Andhra Pradesh, Maharashtra, Rajasthan, Gujarat, Jharkhand, Chhattisgarh, Madhya Pradesh, Odisha, northern West Bengal and the Northeast India.

In March 2018, the party won 19 out of 60 assembly seats in the Meghalaya Legislative Assembly election 2018 and formed government in the state in coalition with BJP and other parties and party president Conrad Sangma sworn in as Chief Minister of the state. In May 2018, the party won Williamnagar Assembly seat in a by-election making its tally to 20 out of 60 assembly seats in Meghalaya Legislative Assembly.

In March 2023, the party emerged as the single largest party and won 26 out of 60 assembly seats in the Meghalaya Legislative Assembly election 2023 and formed government in the state in coalition with BJP and other parties and party president Conrad Sangma sworn in as Chief Minister of the state.

=== General election results ===
| Election | Lok sabha | Party leader | Seats contested | Seats won | ± in seats | Overall vote % | Vote swing | Ref. |
|---|---|---|---|---|---|---|---|---|
| 2014 | 16th | Conrad Sangma | 8 | 1 / 543 | ▲1 | 0.10 | ▲0.10 | |
| 2019 | 17th | Conrad Sangma | 11 | 1 / 543 | Steady | 0.07 | ▼0.03 | |
| 2024 | 18th | Conrad Sangma | 2 | 0 / 543 | ▼1 | 0.06 | ▼0.01 | |

=== State Assembly elections ===
| Election Year | Leader | seats contested | seats won | ± in seats | Overall votes | % of overall votes | ± in vote share | Sitting side |
Arunachal Pradesh Legislative Assembly
| 2019 | Conrad Sangma | 30 | 5 / 60 | ▼2 | 90,347 | 14.56 | ▲14.56 | Government (BJP coalition) |
| 2024 | Conrad Sangma | 60 | 5 / 60 | - | 98,254 | 16.11 | ▲1.55 | Government (BJP coalition) |
Assam Legislative Assembly
| 2021 | Conrad Sangma | 11 | 0 / 126 | Steady | 18,087 | 0.09 | ▲0.09 | Steady |
| 2026 | Conrad Sangma | 3 | 0 / 126 | Steady | 37,427 | 0.17 | ▲0.08 | Steady |
Bihar Legislative Assembly
| 2020 | | 1 | 0 / 243 | Steady | 649 | 0.00 | | Steady |
Jharkhand Legislative Assembly
| 2019 | | 1 | 0 / 81 | Steady | 987 | 0.01 | ▲0.01 | Steady |
Karnataka Legislative Assembly
| 2023 | | 2 | 0 / 224 | Steady | 489 | 0.00 | | Steady |
Manipur Legislative Assembly
| 2012 | | 5 | 0 / 60 | ▼3 | 17,301 | 1.2% | | Steady |
| 2017 | Conrad Sangma | | 4 / 60 | ▲4 | 83,744 | 5.1 | ▲3.9 | Government (BJP coalition) |
| 2022 | Yumnam Joykumar Singh | 38 | 7 / 60 | ▲3 | 321,302 | 17.3 | ▲12.2 | Government (BJP coalition) |
Meghalaya Legislative Assembly
| 2013 | Conrad Sangma | 32 | 2 / 60 | ▲2 | 1,16,251 | 8.8 | ▲8.8 | Opposition |
| 2018 | Conrad Sangma | 52 | 19 / 60 | ▲17 | 2,33,745 | 20.60 | ▲11.8 | Government (NEDA coal |
| 2023 | Conrad Sangma | 57 | 26 / 60 | ▲7 | 5,84,338 | 31.49 | ▲10.89 | Government (NEDA coalition) |
Mizoram Legislative Assembly
| 2018 | | 10 | 0 / 40 | Steady | 3748 | 0.59 | ▲0.59 | Steady |
Nagaland Legislative Assembly
| 2018 | Conrad Sangma | 25 | 2 / 60 | ▲2 | 71,503 | 7.12 | ▲7.12 | Government (NDPP coalition) |
| 2023 | Andrew Ahoto | 12 | 5 / 60 | ▲3 | 65,920 | 5.76 | ▼1.36 | Government (NDPP coalition) |
Rajasthan Legislative Assembly
| 2013 | Kirodi Lal Meena | 134 | 4 / 200 | ▲4 | 13,12,402 | 4.25 | ▲4.25 | Steady |
| 2018 | | 0 | 0 / 200 | 78' | 0 | 0 | ▼4.25 | Opposition |
| 2023 | | 0 | 0 / 200 | Steady | 0 | 0 | Steady | Government (NDA) |
Tamil Nadu Legislative Assembly
| 2021 | | 3 | 0 / 234 | Steady | 1187 | 0.00 | | Steady |
West Bengal Legislative Assembly
| 2021 | | 3 | 0 / 294 | Steady | 3880 | 0.01 | ▲0.01 | Steady |

== List of MPs from NPP ==
=== Rajya Sabha ===
| Sr. No | Name | Date of Appointment | Date of Retirement |
|---|---|---|---|
| 1 | Wanweiroy Kharlukhi | 22-Jun-2020 | 21-Jun-2026 |
| 2 | James Sangma | 22-Jun-2026 | Incumbent |

=== Lok Sabha ===
| No. | Lok sabha | Constituency | Name | Election |
|---|---|---|---|---|
| 1 | 16th | Tura (ST) | Purno Agitok Sangma | 2014 |
| 2 | 16th | Tura (ST) | Conrad Sangma | 2016 (by election) |
| 3 | 17th | Tura (ST) | Agatha Sangma | 2019 |

== State Committees ==
| State/UT | Committee | President | In-charge | Treasurer |
| State Committees of the National People's Party | | | | |
|---|---|---|---|---|
| Arunachal Pradesh | NPP Arunachal Pradesh | | | |
| Assam | NPP Assam | Dilip Kumar Borah | | |
| Nagaland | NPP Nagaland | | | |
| Manipur | NPP Manipur | | | |
| Mizoram | NPP Mizoram | | | |
| Tripura | NPP Tripura | | | |
| West Bengal | NPP West Bengal | Anish Kumar Singh | | |
| Karnataka | NPP Karnataka | Ashok Xavier Kumar | Prabhu Bosco | Stannis Raja |
| Kerala | NPP Kerala | Thomas K.T | | |
| Pondicherry | NPP Pondicherry | Sidanand (Premier Murali) | | |
| Meghalaya | NPP Meghalaya | Conrad Sangma | | |
| Tamilnadu | NPP Tamilnadu | G.Srinivasan | | |

== List of NPP State Governments ==
=== Meghalaya ===
| Assembly | Chief Minister | Cabinet | Deputy Chief Minister/s | | Tenure | | | Election |
|---|---|---|---|---|---|---|---|---|
| 10th | Conrad Sangma | Sangma I | Prestone Tynsong | - | 6 March 2018 | 7 March 2023 | 8 years, 232 days | 2018 |
| 11th | Conrad Sangma | Sangma II | Prestone Tynsong | Sniawbhalang Dhar | 7 March 2023 | Incumbent | 8 years, 232 days | 2023 |

== See also ==
- List of political parties in India
