= 2019 Indian general election in Meghalaya =

Indian lower house election in Meghalaya

2019 Indian General Election in Meghalaya
- 11 April 2019

All 2 Meghalaya seats in the Lok Sabha
- Turnout: 71.43% (▲2.63%)
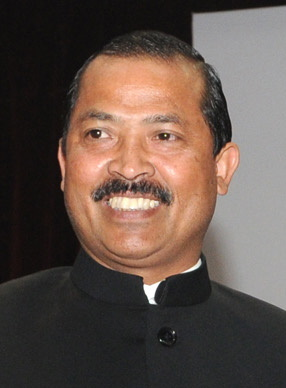

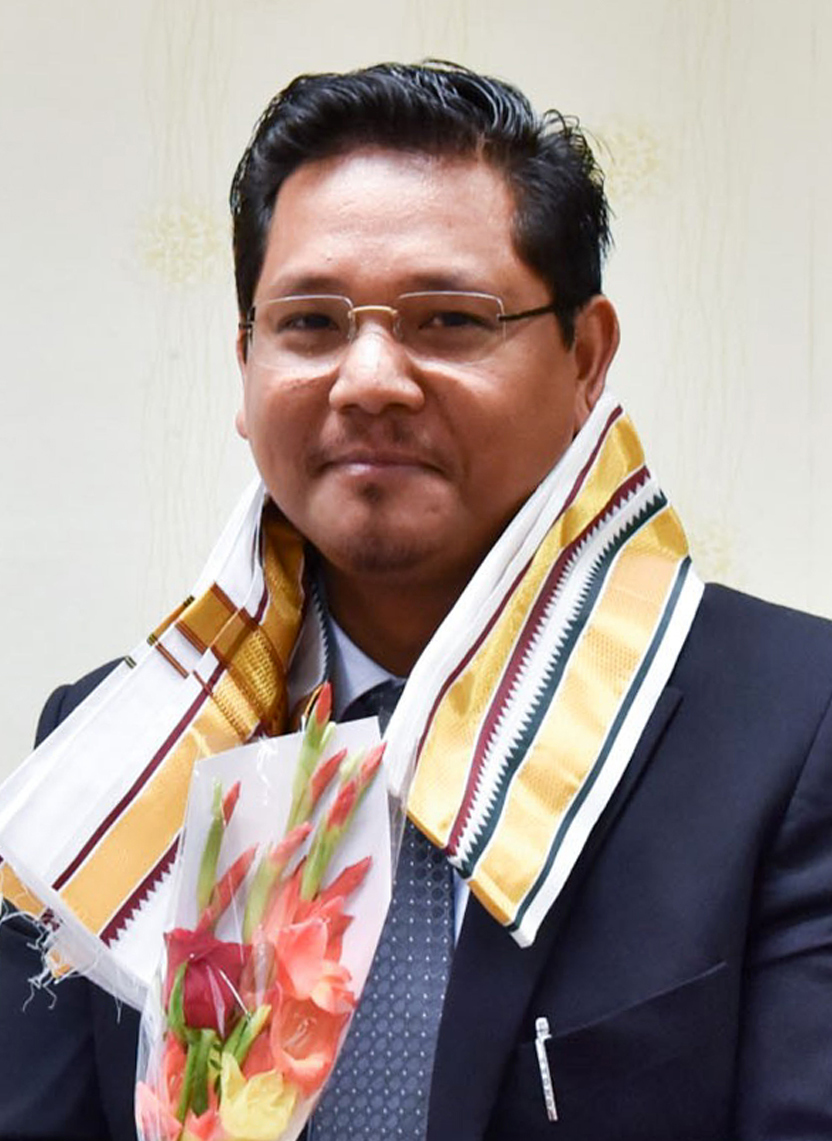
	First party	Second party
Leader	Vincent Pala	Conrad Sangma
Party	INC	NPP
Seats won	1	1
Seat change	Steady	Steady
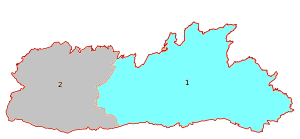
- Meghalaya
Prime Minister before election
Narendra Modi
BJP
Prime Minister after election
Narendra Modi
BJP

The 2019 Indian general election in Meghalaya for two Lok Sabha seats was held in a single phase on 11 April 2019.

== Contested Parties ==
Party	Flag	Symbol	Leader	Seats contested
Indian National Congress			Vincent Pala	2
National People's Party			Conrad Sangma	1
United Democratic Party (Meghalaya)			Metbah Lyngdoh	1
Bharatiya Janata Party			Narendra Modi	2

== Candidates ==
Constituency							
Constituency		NDA		UPA		Others	
1	Shillong	BJP	Sanbor Shullai	INC	Vincent Pala	UDP	Jemino Mawthoh
2	Tura	BJP	Rikman Garrey Momin	INC	Mukul Sangma	NPP	Agatha Sangma

== Results ==
=== Party wise ===
Party Name	Popular vote			Seats		
Party Name	Votes	%	±pp	Contested	Won	+/−
INC	6,60,114	48.28	▲10.35	2	1	Steady
NPEP	3,04,455	22.27	▲0.07	1	1	Steady
UDP	2,67,256	19.55	▲9.64	1	0	Steady
BJP	1,08,390	7.93	▼0.97	2	0	Steady
IND	16,142	1.18	▼15.58	3	0	Steady
NOTA	10,874	0.80	▼2.00			
Total	13,67,231	100%	-	9	2	-

=== Constituency wise ===
#	Constituency	Turnout	Winner	Party	Runner-up	Party	Margin
1	Shillong	65.48 ▲	Vincent H. Pala	INC	Jemino Mawthoh	UDP	1,52,433
2	Tura	81.38 ▲	Agatha K. Sangma	NPP	Dr. Mukul Sangma	INC	64,030

== Assembly segments wise lead of Parties ==

Party	Assembly segments	Position in Assembly (as of 2023 elections)
Indian National Congress	39	5
National People's Party	18	26
Bharatiya Janata Party	2	2
United Democratic Party (Meghalaya)	1	12
Others	0	9
Total	60	

=== Constituency Wise ===
Constituency		Winner			Runner-up			Margin
#	Name	Candidate	Party	Votes	Candidate	Party	Votes	Margin
Shillong Lok Sabha constituency
1	Nartiang	Vincent Pala	INC	14,773	Jemino Mawthoh	UDP	8,584	6,189
2	Jowai	Vincent Pala	INC	12,154	Jemino Mawthoh	UDP	8,236	3,918
3	Raliang	Vincent Pala	INC	11,173	Jemino Mawthoh	UDP	7,612	3,561
4	Mowkaiaw	Vincent Pala	INC	13,960	Jemino Mawthoh	UDP	5,471	8,489
5	Sutnga Saipung	Vincent Pala	INC	15,323	Jemino Mawthoh	UDP	13,184	2,139
6	Khliehriat	Jemino Mawthoh	UDP	15,870	Vincent Pala	INC	11,809	4,061
7	Amlarem	Vincent Pala	INC	12,393	Jemino Mawthoh	UDP	8,860	3,533
8	Mawhati	Vincent Pala	INC	15,405	Jemino Mawthoh	UDP	5,792	9,613
9	Nongpoh	Vincent Pala	INC	15,151	Jemino Mawthoh	UDP	5,256	9,895
10	Jirang	Vincent Pala	INC	15,234	Jemino Mawthoh	UDP	6,008	9,226
11	Umsning	Vincent Pala	INC	15,485	Jemino Mawthoh	UDP	5,420	10,065
12	Umroi	Vincent Pala	INC	11,896	Jemino Mawthoh	UDP	6,420	5,476
13	Mawryngkneng	Vincent Pala	INC	12,346	Jemino Mawthoh	UDP	9,425	2,921
14	Pynthorumkhrah	Vincent Pala	INC	8,141	Sanbor Shullai	BJP	7,978	163
15	Mawlai	Vincent Pala	INC	16,516	Jemino Mawthoh	UDP	8,229	8,287
16	East Shillong	Vincent Pala	INC	6,585	Sanbor Shullai	BJP	4,819	1,766
17	North Shillong	Vincent Pala	INC	6,143	Sanbor Shullai	BJP	5,845	298
18	West Shillong	Sanbor Shullai	BJP	7,951	Vincent Pala	INC	5,406	2,545
19	South Shillong	Sanbor Shullai	BJP	12,514	Jemino Mawthoh	UDP	2,179	10,335
20	Mylliem	Vincent Pala	INC	11,556	Jemino Mawthoh	UDP	5,974	5,582
21	Nongthymmai	Jemino Mawthoh	UDP	8,290	Vincent Pala	INC	8,085	205
22	Nongkrem	Vincent Pala	INC	11,770	Jemino Mawthoh	UDP	7,163	4,607
23	Sohiong	Vincent Pala	INC	10,065	Jemino Mawthoh	UDP	8,158	1,907
24	Mawphlang	Vincent Pala	INC	11,943	Jemino Mawthoh	UDP	8,047	3,896
25	Mawsynram	Vincent Pala	INC	9,437	Jemino Mawthoh	UDP	8,232	1,205
26	Shella	Vincent Pala	INC	9,752	Jemino Mawthoh	UDP	6,407	3,345
27	Pynursla	Vincent Pala	INC	10,647	Jemino Mawthoh	UDP	9,451	1,196
28	Sohra	Vincent Pala	INC	10,608	Jemino Mawthoh	UDP	5,516	5,092
29	Mawkynrew	Vincent Pala	INC	10,867	Jemino Mawthoh	UDP	9,157	1,710
30	Mairang	Vincent Pala	INC	12,638	Jemino Mawthoh	UDP	11,928	710
31	Mawthadraishan	Vincent Pala	INC	16,130	Jemino Mawthoh	UDP	6,883	9,247
32	Nongstoin	Vincent Pala	INC	15,745	Jemino Mawthoh	UDP	7,556	8,189
33	Rambraijyrngam	Vincent Pala	INC	13,303	Jemino Mawthoh	UDP	7,120	6,183
34	Mawshynrut	Vincent Pala	INC	11,466	Jemino Mawthoh	UDP	8,904	2,562
35	Ranikor	Vincent Pala	INC	10,117	Jemino Mawthoh	UDP	8,555	1,562
36	Mawkyrwat	Vincent Pala	INC	9,841	Jemino Mawthoh	UDP	9,617	224
Tura Lok Sabha constituency
37	Kharkutta	Agatha Sangma	NPP	17,234	Mukul Sangma	INC	12,252	4,982
38	Mendipathar	Agatha Sangma	NPP	11,169	Mukul Sangma	INC	8,355	2,814
39	Resubelpara	Mukul Sangma	INC	10,956	Agatha Sangma	NPP	10,459	497
40	Bajengdoba	Agatha Sangma	NPP	12,431	Mukul Sangma	INC	9,839	2,592
41	Songsak	Mukul Sangma	INC	12,237	Agatha Sangma	NPP	10,406	1,831
42	Rongjeng	Agatha Sangma	NPP	17,206	Mukul Sangma	INC	6,162	11,044
43	William Nagar	Agatha Sangma	NPP	13,658	Mukul Sangma	INC	9,765	3,893
44	Raksamgre	Agatha Sangma	NPP	13,068	Mukul Sangma	INC	7,719	5,349
45	Tikrikilla	Agatha Sangma	NPP	12,143	Mukul Sangma	INC	10,155	1,988
46	Phulbari	Mukul Sangma	INC	11,088	Agatha Sangma	NPP	10,621	467
47	Rajabala	Agatha Sangma	NPP	13,752	Mukul Sangma	INC	10,886	2,866
48	Selsella	Agatha Sangma	NPP	16,381	Mukul Sangma	INC	11,773	4,608
49	Dadenggre	Agatha Sangma	NPP	12,815	Mukul Sangma	INC	12,359	456
50	North Tura	Agatha Sangma	NPP	13,934	Mukul Sangma	INC	6,934	7,000
51	South Tura	Agatha Sangma	NPP	12,108	Mukul Sangma	INC	7,755	4,353
52	Rangsakona	Agatha Sangma	NPP	12,855	Mukul Sangma	INC	12,612	243
53	Ampati	Mukul Sangma	INC	14,600	Agatha Sangma	NPP	10,109	4,491
54	Mahendraganj	Mukul Sangma	INC	13,644	Agatha Sangma	NPP	11,808	1,836
55	Salmanpara	Agatha Sangma	NPP	10,561	Mukul Sangma	INC	9,925	636
56	Gambegre	Agatha Sangma	NPP	14,296	Mukul Sangma	INC	7,196	7,100
57	Dalu	Agatha Sangma	NPP	9,339	Mukul Sangma	INC	4,018	5,321
58	Rongara Siju	Agatha Sangma	NPP	13,850	Mukul Sangma	INC	9,623	4,227
59	Chockpot	Mukul Sangma	INC	11,391	Agatha Sangma	NPP	10,810	581
60	Baghmara	Agatha Sangma	NPP	13,172	Mukul Sangma	INC	8,996	4,176
