= 11th Meghalaya Assembly =

Unicameral legislature of the Indian state of Meghalaya

←	10th Meghalaya Assembly

Overview
- Legislative body: Meghalaya Legislative Assembly
- Jurisdiction: Meghalaya, India
- Meeting place: Vidhana Bhavan, Shillong, Meghalaya, India
- Government: Meghalaya Democratic Alliance
- Website: https://megassembly.gov.in/

Eleventh Meghalaya Assembly constituted after the 2023 Meghalaya Legislative Assembly election. Elections were held in 59 constituencies. Voting on Sohiong was postponed after the death of UDP's candidate H. D. R. Lyngdoh.

== History ==
After results were declared on 2 March 2023, it resulted into a hung assembly. Ruling NPP got 26 seats however BJP supported MDA.

== Notable positions ==
S.No	Position	Portrait	Name	Party	Constituency	Office Taken
1	Speaker		Thomas A. Sangma	NPP	North Tura	9 March 2023
2	Deputy Speaker		Limison D. Sangma	NPP	Raksamgre (ST)	15 September 2025
3	Leader of the House (Chief Minister)		Conrad Sangma	NPP	South Tura	7 March 2023
4	Deputy Chief Minister		Prestone Tynsong	NPP	Pynursla	7 March 2023
4	Deputy Chief Minister		Sniawbhalang Dhar	NPP	Nartiang	7 March 2023
5	Leader of the Opposition		Mukul Sangma	AITC	Mylliem	9 June 2023

== Party wise distribution ==
Alliance	Party	No. of MLA's		Leader of the Party in Assembly	Leader's Constituency
Meghalaya Democratic Alliance	National People's Party	33	50	Conrad Sangma	South Tura
Meghalaya Democratic Alliance	Bharatiya Janata Party	10	50	Sanbor Shullai	South Shillong
Meghalaya Democratic Alliance	Hill State People's Democratic Party	2	50	Methodius Dkhar	Mawshynrut (ST)
Meghalaya Democratic Alliance	Independent	2	50	•Remington Gabil Momin •Kartush R. Marak	•Rambrai-Jyrngam (ST) •Baghmara (ST)
None	Mamata All India Trinamool Congress	5			
None	Voice of the People Party	4			
None	United Democratic Party	1		Metbah Lyngdoh	Mairang
Total no. of MLAs			60		

== Members of Legislative Assembly ==
District	No.	Constituency	Name	Party		Remarks
West Jaintia Hills	1	Nartiang (ST)	Sniawbhalang Dhar	National People's Party	MDA	Deputy Chief Minister
West Jaintia Hills	2	Jowai (ST)	Wailadmiki Shylla	National People's Party	MDA	Cabinet Minister
West Jaintia Hills	3	Raliang (ST)	Comingone Ymbon	National People's Party	MDA	
West Jaintia Hills	4	Mowkaiaw (ST)	Nujorki Sungoh	National People's Party	MDA	Switched from UDP to NPP
East Jaintia Hills	5	Sutnga Saipung (ST)	Santa Mary Shylla	National People's Party	MDA	
East Jaintia Hills	6	Khliehriat (ST)	Kyrmen Shylla	Bharatiya Janata Party	MDA	Switched from UDP to BJP
West Jaintia Hills	7	Amlarem (ST)	Lahkmen Rymbui	Bharatiya Janata Party	MDA	Cabinet Minister; Switched from UDP to BJP
Ri Bhoi	8	Mawhati (ST)	Charles Marngar	National People's Party	MDA	Switched from INC to NPP
Ri Bhoi	9	Nongpoh (ST)	Mayralborn Syiem	Bharatiya Janata Party	MDA	Switched from UDP to BJP
Ri Bhoi	10	Jirang (ST)	Sosthenes Sohyun	National People's Party	MDA	Cabinet Minister
Ri Bhoi	11	Umsning (ST)	Celestine Lyngdoh	National People's Party	MDA	Switched from INC to NPP
Ri Bhoi	12	Umroi (ST)	Damanbait Lamare	National People's Party	MDA	
East Khasi Hills	13	Mawrengkneng (ST)	Heaving Stone Kharpran	Voice of the People Party	Others	
East Khasi Hills	14	Pynthorumkhrah	Alexander Laloo Hek	Bharatiya Janata Party	MDA	
East Khasi Hills	15	Mawlai (ST)	Brightstarwell Marbaniang	Voice of the People Party	Others	
East Khasi Hills	16	East Shillong (ST)	Ampareen Lyngdoh	National People's Party	MDA	
East Khasi Hills	17	North Shillong (ST)	Adelbert Nongrum	Voice of the People Party	Others	
East Khasi Hills	18	West Shillong	Paul Lyngdoh	National People's Party	MDA	Switched from UDP to NPP
East Khasi Hills	19	South Shillong	Sanbor Shullai	Bharatiya Janata Party	MDA	Cabinet Minister
East Khasi Hills	20	Mylliem (ST)	Ronnie V. Lyngdoh	National People's Party	MDA	Switched from UPA to MDA
East Khasi Hills	21	Nongthymmai (ST)	Charles Pyngrope	Mamata All India Trinamool Congress	Others	
East Khasi Hills	22	Nongkrem (ST)	Ardent Miller Basaiawmoit	Voice of the People Party	Others	
East Khasi Hills	23	Sohiong (ST)	Synshar Lyngdoh Thabah	Bharatiya Janata Party	MDA	Switched from UDP to BJP
East Khasi Hills	24	Mawphlang (ST)	Matthew Beyondstar Kurbah	Bharatiya Janata Party	MDA	Switched from UDP to BJP
East Khasi Hills	25	Mawsynram (ST)	Ollan Singh Suin	Bharatiya Janata Party	MDA	Switched from UDP to BJP
East Khasi Hills	26	Shella (ST)	Balajied Kupar Synrem	Bharatiya Janata Party	MDA	Switched from UDP to BJP
East Khasi Hills	27	Pynursla (ST)	Prestone Tysong	National People's Party	MDA	Deputy Chief Minister
East Khasi Hills	28	Sohra (ST)	Gavin Miguel Mylleim	People's Democratic Front	MDA	PDF merged with NPP
East Khasi Hills	28	Sohra (ST)	Gavin Miguel Mylleim	National People's Party	MDA	PDF merged with NPP
East Khasi Hills	29	Mawkynrew (ST)	Banteidor Lyngdoh	People's Democratic Front	MDA	PDF merged with NPP
East Khasi Hills	29	Mawkynrew (ST)	Banteidor Lyngdoh	National People's Party	MDA	PDF merged with NPP
Eastern West Khasi Hills	30	Mairang (ST)	Metbah Lyngdoh	United Democratic Party	MDA	Cabinet Minister
Eastern West Khasi Hills	31	Mawthadraishan (ST)	Shakliar Warjri	Hill State People's Democratic Party	MDA	
West Khasi Hills	32	Nongstoin (ST)	Gabriel Wahlang	National People's Party	MDA	Switched from INC to NPP
West Khasi Hills	33	Rambrai-Jyrngam (ST)	Remington Gabil Momin	Independent politician	MDA	
West Khasi Hills	34	Mawshynrut (ST)	Methodius Dkhar	Hill State People's Democratic Party	MDA	Cabinet Minister
South West Khasi Hills	35	Ranikor (ST)	Pius Marwein	Bharatiya Janata Party	MDA	Switched from UDP to BJP
South West Khasi Hills	36	Mawkyrwat (ST)	Renikton Lyngdoh Tongkhar	National People's Party	MDA	Switched from UDP to NPP
North Garo Hills	37	Kharkutta (ST)	Rupert Momin	National People's Party	MDA	
North Garo Hills	38	Mendipathar (ST)	Marthon J. Sangma	National People's Party	MDA	
North Garo Hills	39	Resubelpara (ST)	Timothy J. Shira	National People's Party	MDA	Cabinet Minister
North Garo Hills	40	Bajengdoba (ST)	Pongseng Marak	National People's Party	MDA	
East Garo Hills	41	Songsak (ST)	Mukul Sangma	Mamata All India Trinamool Congress	Others	Leader of Opposition MATMC
East Garo Hills	42	Rongjeng (ST)	Jim M. Sangma	National People's Party	MDA	
East Garo Hills	43	Williamnagar (ST)	Marcuise N. Marak	National People's Party	MDA	Cabinet Minister
West Garo Hills	44	Raksamgre (ST)	Limison D. Sangma	National People's Party	MDA	
West Garo Hills	45	Tikrikilla (ST)	Jimmy D. Sangma	National People's Party	MDA	
West Garo Hills	46	Phulbari	Abu Taher Mondal	National People's Party	MDA	
West Garo Hills	47	Rajabala	Mizanur Rahman Kazi	Mamata All India Trinamool Congress	Others	
West Garo Hills	48	Selsella (ST)	Arbinstone B. Marak	National People's Party	MDA	
West Garo Hills	49	Dadenggre (ST)	Rupa M. Marak	Mamata All India Trinamool Congress	Others	
West Garo Hills	50	North Tura (ST)	Thomas A. Sangma	National People's Party	MDA	Speaker
West Garo Hills	51	South Tura (ST)	Conrad Sangma	National People's Party	MDA	Chief Minister
West Garo Hills	52	Rangsakona (ST)	Subir Marak	National People's Party	MDA	
South West Garo Hills	53	Ampati (ST)	Miani D Shira	Mamata All India Trinamool Congress	Others	
South West Garo Hills	54	Mahendraganj (ST)	Sanjay A. Sangma	National People's Party	MDA	
South West Garo Hills	55	Salmanpara (ST)	Ian Botham K. Sangma	National People's Party	MDA	
West Garo Hills	56	Gambegre (ST)	Saleng A. Sangma	Indian National Congress	UPA	Elected to 18th Loksabha
West Garo Hills	56	Gambegre (ST)	Mehtab Chandee Agitok Sangma	National People's Party	MDA	Elected in bypoll
West Garo Hills	57	Dalu (ST)	Brening A. Sangma	National People's Party	MDA	Cabinet Minister
South Garo Hills	58	Rongara Siju (ST)	Rakkam A Sangma	National People's Party	MDA	
South Garo Hills	59	Chokpot (ST)	Sengchim N. Sangma	National People's Party	MDA	
South Garo Hills	60	Baghmara (ST)	Kartush R. Marak	Independent politician	MDA	
