= List of constituencies of the Meghalaya Legislative Assembly =

Meghalaya Legislative Assembly consistencies
- 11th Meghalaya Assembly

Type
- Type: Unicameral
- Term limits: 5 years

Elections
- Voting system: First past the post
- Last election: 27 February 2023 and 10 May 2023

Meeting place
- Vidhana Bhavan, Shillong, Meghalaya, India

Website
- megassembly.gov.in

Assembly constituencies of Meghalaya

The Meghalaya Legislative Assembly is the unicameral legislature of the Indian state of Meghalaya. The seat of the Legislative Assembly is at Shillong, the capital of the state. The term of the Legislative Assembly is five years, unless it is dissolved earlier. Presently, it comprises 60 members who are directly elected from single-seat constituencies.

== Constituencies ==
The following is a list of the constituencies of the Meghalaya Legislative Assembly.

No.	Name	Reserved for (SC/ST/None)	Electors (2023)	District	Lok Sabha Constituency
1	Nartiang	ST	44,478	West Jaintia Hill	Shillong
2	Jowai	ST	40,581	West Jaintia Hill	Shillong
3	Raliang	ST	39,074	West Jaintia Hill	Shillong
4	Mowkaiaw	ST	38,967	West Jaintia Hill	Shillong
5	Sutnga Saipung	ST	46,973	East Jaintia Hill	Shillong
6	Khliehriat	ST	46,944	East Jaintia Hill	Shillong
7	Amlarem	ST	39,149	West Jaintia Hill	Shillong
8	Mawhati	ST	39,235	Ri Bhoi	Shillong
9	Nongpoh	ST	37,588	Ri Bhoi	Shillong
10	Jirang	ST	42,206	Ri Bhoi	Shillong
11	Umsning	ST	38,958	Ri Bhoi	Shillong
12	Umroi	ST	32,602	Ri Bhoi	Shillong
13	Mawrengkneng	ST	39,802	East Khasi Hills	Shillong
14	Pynthorumkhrah	None	34,823	East Khasi Hills	Shillong
15	Mawlai	ST	50,101	East Khasi Hills	Shillong
16	East Shillong	ST	25,504	East Khasi Hills	Shillong
17	North Shillong	ST	28,336	East Khasi Hills	Shillong
18	West Shillong	None	27,329	East Khasi Hills	Shillong
19	South Shillong	None	34,186	East Khasi Hills	Shillong
20	Mylliem	ST	37,369	East Khasi Hills	Shillong
21	Nongthymmai	ST	36,602	East Khasi Hills	Shillong
22	Nongkrem	ST	38,705	East Khasi Hills	Shillong
23	Sohiong	ST	34,783	East Khasi Hills	Shillong
24	Mawphlang	ST	35,484	East Khasi Hills	Shillong
25	Mawsynram	ST	37,188	East Khasi Hills	Shillong
26	Shella	ST	34,682	East Khasi Hills	Shillong
27	Pynursla	ST	38,907	East Khasi Hills	Shillong
28	Sohra	ST	29,932	East Khasi Hills	Shillong
29	Mawkynrew	ST	37,189	East Khasi Hills	Shillong
30	Mairang	ST	42,402	Eastern West Khasi Hills	Shillong
31	Mawthadraishan	ST	43,766	Eastern West Khasi Hills	Shillong
32	Nongstoin	ST	43,120	West Khasi Hills	Shillong
33	Rambrai-Jyrngam	ST	39,415	West Khasi Hills	Shillong
34	Mawshynrut	ST	41,064	West Khasi Hills	Shillong
35	Ranikor	ST	35,764	South West Khasi Hills	Shillong
36	Mawkyrwat	ST	37,565	South West Khasi Hills	Shillong
37	Kharkutta	ST	43,109	North Garo Hills	Tura
38	Mendipathar	ST	29,232	North Garo Hills	Tura
39	Resubelpara	ST	30,411	North Garo Hills	Tura
40	Bajengdoba	ST	33,102	North Garo Hills	Tura
41	Songsak	ST	31,824	East Garo Hills	Tura
42	Rongjeng	ST	35,340	East Garo Hills	Tura
43	Williamnagar	ST	37,359	East Garo Hills	Tura
44	Raksamgre	ST	31,175	West Garo Hills	Tura
45	Tikrikilla	ST	36,080	West Garo Hills	Tura
46	Phulbari	None	32,587	West Garo Hills	Tura
47	Rajabala	None	35,882	West Garo Hills	Tura
48	Selsella	ST	36,217	West Garo Hills	Tura
49	Dadenggre	ST	36,136	West Garo Hills	Tura
50	North Tura	ST	34,434	West Garo Hills	Tura
51	South Tura	ST	33,606	West Garo Hills	Tura
52	Rangsakona	ST	37,543	West Garo Hills	Tura
53	Ampati	ST	33,101	South West Garo Hills	Tura
54	Mahendraganj	ST	36,609	South West Garo Hills	Tura
55	Salmanpara	ST	31,067	South West Garo Hills	Tura
56	Gambegre	ST	31,439	West Garo Hills	Tura
57	Dalu	ST	22,157	West Garo Hills	Tura
58	Rongara Siju	ST	34,468	South Garo Hills	Tura
59	Chokpot	ST	32,180	South Garo Hills	Tura
60	Baghmara	ST	33,246	South Garo Hills	Tura
