= 2013 Meghalaya Legislative Assembly election =

Indian state election

- 23 February 2013
- Turnout: 87.97% (▼1.87%)

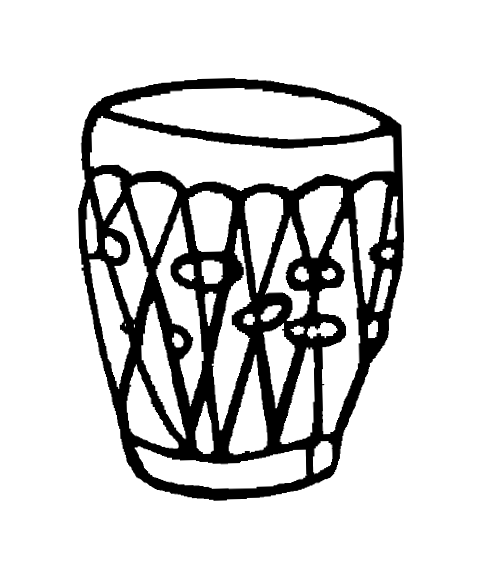
	First party	Second party
Leader	Mukul Sangma	Donkupar Roy
Party	INC	UDP
Last election	25 seats	11 seats
Seats won	29	8
Seat change	▲4	▼3
Popular vote	458,783	225676
Percentage	34.78%	17.11%
Swing	▲1.88	▼1.26%
Chief Minister before election
Mukul Sangma
INC
Chief Minister
Mukul Sangma
INC

The Meghalaya Legislative Assembly election of 2013 was held on 23 February 2013 to elect the Members of the Legislative Assembly (MLA) from each of the 60 Assembly Constituencies (ACs) in the state of Meghalaya in India.

== Background ==
The 8th Meghalaya Legislative Assembly was formed after Meghalaya Legislative Assembly election in 2008 and this assembly is to expire on 10 March 2013. Hence the new election to the 9th Meghalaya Legislative Assembly is announced by the Election Commission of India.

After the scrutiny of the nomination by the candidates, 345 candidates were able to contest in polls in which 320 men and 25 women.

== Parties contested ==
Party	Flag	Symbol	Leader	Seats contested
Indian National Congress			Mukul Sangma	60
Meghalaya United Democratic Party			Donkupar Roy	50
National People's Party			P. A. Sangma	32
Nationalist Congress Party			Sharad Pawar	21
Hill State People's Democratic Party				17
Bharatiya Janata Party			Nitin Gadkari	13
Samajwadi Party			Mulayam Singh Yadav	11
Garo National Council				6
Lok Jan Shakti Party			Ram Vilas Paswan	4
Khun Hynniewtrep National Awakening Movement				4
Meghalaya Democratic Party				2
North East Social Democratic Party			Lamboklang Mylliem	1
Communist Party of India			Sudhakar Reddy	1
Rashtriya Secular Congress				1

== Results ==
← Summary of the 23 February 2013 Meghalaya Legislative Assembly election results
Parties and coalitions	Popular vote			Seats	
Parties and coalitions	Votes	%	±pp	Won	+/−
Indian National Congress (INC)	458,783	34.8		29	▲4
United Democratic Party (UDP)	225,676	17.1		8	▼3
National People's Party (NPP)	116,251	8.8		2	▲2
Hill State People's Democratic Party (HSPDP)	55,049	4.2		4	▲2
Nationalist Congress Party (NCP)	24,256	1.8		2	▼13
North East Social Democratic Party (NESDP)	10,336	0.8		1	▲1
Garo National Council (GNC)	9,300	0.7		1	▲1
Independents (IND)	365,287	10.0		13	▲8
Total	1,319,039	100.00		60	±0

== Elected members ==
Winner, runner-up, voter turnout, and victory margin in every constituency
Assembly Constituency		Turnout	Winner				Runner Up				Margin
#k	Names	%	Candidate	Party	Votes	%	Candidate	Party	Votes	%	Margin
1	Nartiang	93.36%	Sniawbhalang Dhar	INC	18,392	65.09%	Hilarius Dkhar	Independent	9,534	33.74%	8,858
2	Jowai	88.38%	Dr. Roytre Christopher Laloo	INC	9,496	37.16%	Moonlight Pariat	Independent	8,817	34.5%	679
3	Raliang	92.59%	Comingone Ymbon	INC	11,272	46.63%	Konstan Sungoh	UDP	7,850	32.47%	3,422
4	Mowkaiaw	93.74%	Robinus Syngkon	Independent	7,064	29.67%	Qually Suiam	INC	6,370	26.75%	694
5	Sutnga Saipung	92.12%	Hopeful Bamon	Independent	14,205	48.92%	Shitlang Pale	INC	12,743	43.89%	1,462
6	Khliehriat	94.42%	Justine Dkhar	Independent	10,807	36.37%	Finelynes Bareh	Independent	9,169	30.85%	1,638
7	Amlarem	91.22%	Stephanson Mukhim	Independent	8,297	33.25%	Lahkmen Rymbui	INC	7,163	28.71%	1,134
8	Mawhati	91.48%	Julias Kitbok Dorphang	Independent	8,246	35.7%	Donbok Khymdeit	UDP	7,087	30.69%	1,159
9	Nongpoh	89.33%	Dr. D. D. Lapang	INC	10,927	50.88%	Rona Khymdeit	UDP	7,329	34.13%	3,598
10	Jirang	87.51%	Lamboklang Mylliem	NESDP	10,336	41.76%	Barnabas Nongbah	INC	7,840	31.68%	2,496
11	Umsning	85.99%	Dr. Celestine Lyngdoh	INC	6,637	31.3%	Donkupar Sumer	Independent	4,695	22.14%	1,942
12	Umroi	90.77%	Ngaitlang Dhar	INC	9,489	51.23%	Stanlywiss Rymbai	Independent	5,351	28.89%	4,138
13	Mawryngkneng	89.15%	David A Nongrum	Independent	6,200	27.6%	Pynehborlang Mukhim	INC	5,574	24.81%	626
14	Pynthorumkhrah	82.06%	Alexander Laloo Hek	INC	10,588	51.73%	Process T. Sawkmie	Independent	8,637	42.2%	1,951
15	Mawlai	82.16%	Embhahlang Syiemlieh	UDP	14,029	49.93%	Founder Strong Cajee	INC	8,250	29.36%	5,779
16	East Shillong	74.68%	Dr. Mazel Ampareen Lyngdoh	INC	10,103	62.94%	B. M. Lanong	UDP	5,019	31.27%	5,084
17	North Shillong	73.39%	Roshan Warjri	INC	8,445	47.14%	Adelbert Nongrum	KHNAM	6,265	34.97%	2,180
18	West Shillong	79.17%	Paul Lyngdoh	UDP	9,333	50.54%	Mohendro Rapsang	INC	8,852	47.93%	481
19	South Shillong	75.35%	Sanbor Shullai	NCP	7,179	34.38%	Manas Chaudhuri	INC	6,034	28.9%	1,145
20	Mylliem	83.64%	Ronnie V. Lyngdoh	INC	8,072	38.02%	Telinia S. Thangkhiew	Independent	6,274	29.55%	1,798
21	Nongthymmai	73.34%	Jemino Mawthoh	UDP	9,347	44.95%	Charles Pyngrope	INC	8,210	39.48%	1,137
22	Nongkrem	84.37%	Ardent Miller Basaiawmoit	HSPDP	8,585	38.54%	Lambor Malngiang	INC	6,595	29.6%	1,990
23	Sohiong	91.95%	H. Donkupar R. Lyngdoh	INC	12,353	56.53%	Braston Kharphuli	UDP	9,501	43.47%	2,852
24	Mawphlang	88.84%	Kennedy Cornelius Khyriem	INC	9,212	43.12%	J. Antonius Lyngdoh	UDP	5,868	27.46%	3,344
25	Mawsynram	89.41%	Pynshngainlang Syiem	INC	6,923	30.33%	Khrawkupar Jyrwa	UDP	6,414	28.1%	509
26	Shella	88.37%	Dr. Donkupar Roy	UDP	5,940	32.17%	Leston Wanswett	Independent	5,585	30.25%	355
27	Pynursla	93.24%	Prestone Tynsong	INC	12,251	46.06%	Banalari Khongwar	UDP	8,187	30.78%	4,064
28	Sohra	89.52%	Titosstarwell Chyne	UDP	8,787	47.84%	Dr. Phlour W. Khongjee	INC	6,621	36.05%	2,166
29	Mawkynrew	92.24%	Remington Pyngrope	UDP	6,513	27.25%	Banteidor Lyngdoh	Independent	6,076	25.42%	437
30	Mairang	90.97%	Metbah Lyngdoh	UDP	13,726	52.68%	Eureka F.P. Lyngdoh	INC	12,110	46.48%	1,616
31	Mawthadraishan	90.25%	Brolding Nongsiej	UDP	7,786	30.%	Fenella Lyngdoh Nonglait	HSPDP	7,362	28.37%	424
32	Nongstoin	89.53%	Hopingstone Lyngdoh	HSPDP	10,931	45.58%	Adviser Pariong	INC	8,475	35.34%	2,456
33	Rambrai-Jyrngam	87.25%	Phlastingwell Pangniang	HSPDP	7,625	34.39%	Kimfa Sidney Marbaniang	Independent	5,756	25.96%	1,869
34	Mawshynrut	89.01%	Witting Mawsor	HSPDP	6,778	29.45%	Methodius Dkhar	INC	4,375	19.01%	2,403
35	Ranikor	90.4%	Martin Danggo	INC	9,189	41.23%	Probin K. Raswai	UDP	8,734	39.19%	455
36	Mawkyrwat	92.21%	Rowell Lyngdoh	INC	6,024	26.13%	Hadrian Lyngdoh	Independent	5,050	21.9%	974
37	Kharkutta	84.68%	Cherak Watre Momin	INC	7,733	32.34%	Omillo K. Sangma	NPP	6,046	25.28%	1,687
38	Mendipathar	86.19%	Marthon Sangma	NCP	5,307	30.55%	Frankenstein W. Momin	INC	5,296	30.49%	11
39	Resubelpara	85.59%	Salseng C. Marak	INC	9,070	51.09%	Timothy Shira	NPP	7,741	43.6%	1,329
40	Bajengdoba	89.06%	Brigady Napak Marak	Independent	7,139	35.35%	Adolf Lu Hitler R. Marak	INC	6,919	34.26%	220
41	Songsak	87.85%	Nihim D. Shira	NPP	6,697	34.28%	Fardina C. Marak	Independent	4,518	23.13%	2,179
42	Rongjeng	85.45%	Sengnam Marak	INC	6,709	32.97%	Sabina D Sangma	Independent	3,923	19.28%	2,786
43	Williamnagar	80.7%	Deborah C Marak	INC	8,402	39.01%	Jonathone N Sangma	Independent	5,525	25.65%	2,877
44	Raksamgre	90.32%	Limison D. Sangma	INC	5,761	29.59%	Edmund K Sangma	Independent	4,701	24.14%	1,060
45	Tikrikilla	90.36%	Michael T. Sangma	Independent	6,995	31.14%	Rahinath Barchung	INC	5,293	23.56%	1,702
46	Phulbari	91.8%	Abu Taher Mondal	INC	4,831	23.45%	Mark Goera B. Marak	Independent	4,332	21.03%	499
47	Rajabala	92.82%	Ashahel D. Shira	Independent	6,572	27.36%	Dr. Azad Zaman	Independent	5,681	23.65%	891
48	Selsella	92.62%	Clement Marak	INC	12,004	49.95%	Conrad Sangma	NPP	9,897	41.19%	2,107
49	Dadenggre	91.3%	James Pangsang Kongkal Sangma	NPP	6,725	29.92%	Ismail R. Marak	Independent	5,892	26.21%	833
50	North Tura	80.06%	Noverfield R. Marak	INC	4,713	22.88%	Roger Benny A. Sangma	Independent	4,148	20.14%	565
51	South Tura	76.43%	John Leslee K. Sangma	Independent	7,137	36.31%	Billykid A. Sangma	INC	7,119	36.22%	18
52	Rangsakona	88.41%	Zenith Sangma	INC	11,407	48.23%	Subir Marak	Independent	5,337	22.56%	6,070
53	Ampati	90.42%	Dr. Mukul Sangma	INC	15,031	68.67%	Clement G. Momin	NPP	5,935	27.11%	9,096
54	Mahendraganj	90.9%	Dikkanchi D Shira	INC	11,580	50.16%	Nimarson Momin	UDP	4,721	20.45%	6,859
55	Salmanpara	92.19%	Winnerson D. Sangma	INC	6,824	34.9%	Boston Marak	NPP	4,935	25.24%	1,889
56	Gambegre	91.44%	Saleng A. Sangma	Independent	7,260	37.02%	Besterfield N. Sangma	INC	3,803	19.39%	3,457
57	Dalu	89.24%	Kenethson Sangma	INC	3,363	23.52%	Brening Sangma	SP	2,885	20.17%	478
58	Rongara Siju	87.99%	Rophul S Marak	Independent	5,458	27.21%	Francis Pondit R. Sangma	INC	4,802	23.94%	656
59	Chokpot	87.6%	Clifford Marak	GNC	5,558	28.41%	Phillipole D. Marak	NPP	5,073	25.93%	485
60	Baghmara	87.92%	Samuel M. Sangma	Independent	7,728	38.13%	Sirgan A. Sangma	Independent	4,141	20.43%	3,587
