= Baghmara Assembly constituency =

Baghmara Assembly constituency could refer to one of the following:

- Baghmara, Jharkhand Assembly constituency
- Baghmara, Meghalaya Assembly constituency
