= Bajengdoba Assembly constituency =

Legislative Assembly constituency in Meghalaya State, India

Coordinates: 25.91°N 90.52°E

Bajengdoba
- Constituency No. 40 for the Meghalaya Legislative Assembly

Constituency details
- Country: India
- Region: Northeast India
- State: Meghalaya
- District: North Garo Hills
- Lok Sabha constituency: Tura
- Established: 1972
- Total electors: 33,102
- Reservation: ST

Member of Legislative Assembly
- 11th Meghalaya Legislative Assembly
- Incumbent Pongseng Marak
- Party: NPP
- Alliance: NDA
- Elected year: 2023

Bajengdoba is one of the 60 Legislative Assembly constituencies of Meghalaya state in India.

It is part of North Garo Hills district and is reserved for candidates belonging to the Scheduled Tribes.

== Members of the Legislative Assembly ==
Election	Name	Party
1972	Grohonsing Marak	All Party Hill Leaders Conference
1978	Grohonsing Marak	Indian National Congress
1983	Chamberline Marak	Indian National Congress
1988	Chamberline Marak	Indian National Congress
1993	Chamberline B. Marak	Indian National Congress
1998	Chamberline B. Marak	Indian National Congress
2003	John Manner Marak	Nationalist Congress Party
2008	John Manner Marak	Nationalist Congress Party
2013	Brigady Napak Marak	Independent politician
2018	Pongseng Marak	National People's Party
2023	Pongseng Marak	National People's Party

== Election results ==
=== Assembly Election 2023 ===
2023 Meghalaya Legislative Assembly election: Bajengdoba
Party	Candidate	Votes	%	±%
NPP	Pongseng Marak	9,900	34.52%	▼11.16
INC	Brigady Napak Marak	7,584	26.44%	▼11.53
AITC	Tengrak R. Marak	7,431	25.91%	New
Independent	Chadambe Tengkam B Marak	1,996	6.96%	New
Independent	Rocky R Marak	744	2.59%	New
BJP	Henendra A. Sangma	537	1.87%	▼11.60
UDP	Rakman Ch Marak	491	1.71%	New
NOTA	None of the Above	241	0.84%	▼1.41
Margin of victory		2,316	8.07%	▲0.37
Turnout		28,683	86.65%	▼2.02
Registered electors		33,102		▲15.08
NPP hold		Swing	▼11.16	

=== Assembly Election 2018 ===
2018 Meghalaya Legislative Assembly election: Bajengdoba
Party	Candidate	Votes	%	±%
NPP	Pongseng Marak	11,648	45.67%	▲20.29
INC	Brigady Napak Marak	9,684	37.97%	▲3.71
BJP	John Manner Marak	3,435	13.47%	New
NOTA	None of the Above	573	2.25%	New
Margin of victory		1,964	7.70%	▲6.61
Turnout		25,504	88.67%	▼0.39
Registered electors		28,764		▲26.85
NPP gain from Independent		Swing	▲10.32	

=== Assembly Election 2013 ===
2013 Meghalaya Legislative Assembly election: Bajengdoba
Party	Candidate	Votes	%	±%
Independent	Brigady Napak Marak	7,139	35.35%	New
INC	Adolf Lu Hitler R. Marak	6,919	34.26%	▲0.17
NPP	John Manner Marak	5,126	25.38%	New
UDP	Rocky R Marak	1,011	5.01%	▼15.57
Margin of victory		220	1.09%	▼5.49
Turnout		20,195	89.06%	▼4.07
Registered electors		22,676		▲21.23
Independent gain from NCP		Swing	▼5.32	

=== Assembly Election 2008 ===
2008 Meghalaya Legislative Assembly election: Bajengdoba
Party	Candidate	Votes	%	±%
NCP	John Manner Marak	7,084	40.67%	▼11.13
INC	Chamberline B. Marak	5,938	34.09%	▼5.47
UDP	Brigady Napak Marak	3,584	20.58%	▲15.71
Independent	Winsang Sangma	813	4.67%	New
Margin of victory		1,146	6.58%	▼5.66
Turnout		17,419	93.12%	▲17.22
Registered electors		18,705		▼5.18
NCP hold		Swing	▼11.13	

=== Assembly Election 2003 ===
2003 Meghalaya Legislative Assembly election: Bajengdoba
Party	Candidate	Votes	%	±%
NCP	John Manner Marak	7,756	51.80%	New
INC	Chamberline B. Marak	5,923	39.56%	▼10.23
UDP	Resterbrown Sangma	728	4.86%	▼43.37
GNC	Johindro Momin	567	3.79%	▲1.81
Margin of victory		1,833	12.24%	▲10.69
Turnout		14,974	75.91%	▲3.05
Registered electors		19,727		▲15.19
NCP gain from INC		Swing	▲2.01	

=== Assembly Election 1998 ===
1998 Meghalaya Legislative Assembly election: Bajengdoba
Party	Candidate	Votes	%	±%
INC	Chamberline B. Marak	6,212	49.79%	▼8.35
UDP	John Manner Marak	6,018	48.23%	New
GNC	Grohonsing Marak	247	1.98%	New
Margin of victory		194	1.55%	▼28.76
Turnout		12,477	76.54%	▼4.51
Registered electors		17,126		▲17.51
INC hold		Swing		

=== Assembly Election 1993 ===
1993 Meghalaya Legislative Assembly election: Bajengdoba
Party	Candidate	Votes	%	±%
INC	Chamberline B. Marak	6,555	58.14%	▼6.49
HPU	Johan Manner Marak	3,137	27.82%	▼7.55
MPPP	Jamindro Marak	1,583	14.04%	New
Margin of victory		3,418	30.31%	▲1.06
Turnout		11,275	79.85%	▲4.06
Registered electors		14,574		▲23.66
INC hold		Swing		

=== Assembly Election 1988 ===
1988 Meghalaya Legislative Assembly election: Bajengdoba
Party	Candidate	Votes	%	±%
INC	Chamberline Marak	5,583	64.63%	▲0.80
HPU	Grohonsing Marak	3,056	35.37%	New
Margin of victory		2,527	29.25%	▼0.86
Turnout		8,639	77.18%	▲10.21
Registered electors		11,786		▲16.91
INC hold		Swing		

=== Assembly Election 1983 ===
1983 Meghalaya Legislative Assembly election: Bajengdoba
Party	Candidate	Votes	%	±%
INC	Chamberline Marak	4,059	63.82%	▲12.59
APHLC	Grohonsing Marak	2,144	33.71%	▲3.23
HSPDP	Ketchiner A. Sangma	157	2.47%	New
Margin of victory		1,915	30.11%	▲9.37
Turnout		6,360	66.05%	▲18.72
Registered electors		10,081		▲34.07
INC hold		Swing		

=== Assembly Election 1978 ===
1978 Meghalaya Legislative Assembly election: Bajengdoba
Party	Candidate	Votes	%	±%
INC	Grohonsing Marak	1,709	51.23%	New
APHLC	Levingstone Momin	1,017	30.49%	▼53.73
Independent	Promison Momin	610	18.29%	New
Margin of victory		692	20.74%	▼47.68
Turnout		3,336	48.54%	▲11.98
Registered electors		7,519		▲33.93
INC gain from APHLC		Swing	▼32.98	

=== Assembly Election 1972 ===
1972 Meghalaya Legislative Assembly election: Bajengdoba
Party	Candidate	Votes	%	±%
APHLC	Grohonsing Marak	1,531	84.21%	New
Independent	Broson Momin	287	15.79%	New
Margin of victory		1,244	68.43%	
Turnout		1,818	34.22%	
Registered electors		5,614		
APHLC win (new seat)				

== See also ==
- List of constituencies of the Meghalaya Legislative Assembly
- North Garo Hills district
