= Shitlang Pale =

Indian politician

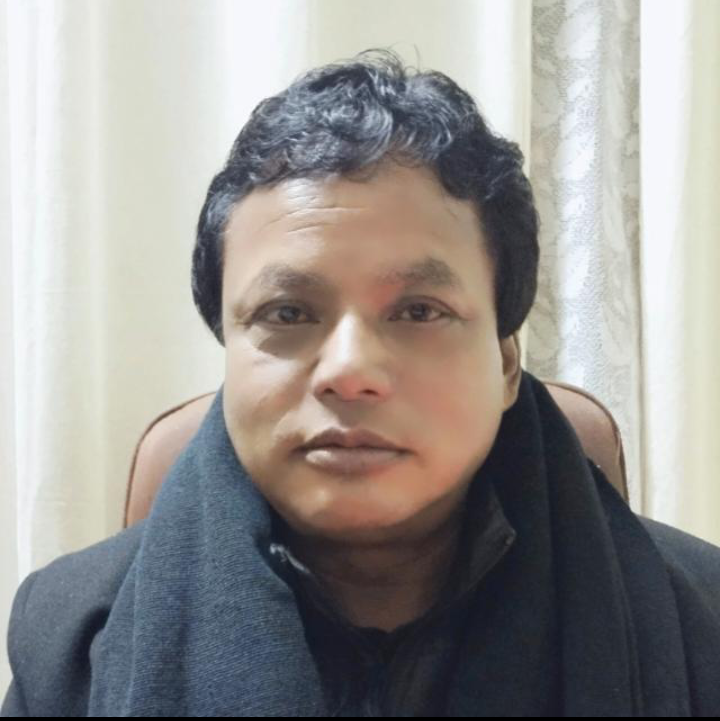
- In office 2018–2023
- Succeeded by: Santa Mary Shylla
- Constituency: Sutnga Saipung

Personal details
- Born: 29 September 1976 (age 49)
- Party: UDP
- Children: 1

Shitlang Pale is an Indian politician from Meghalaya. He has been a member of the All India Trinamool Congress since November 2021, he was previously a longtime member of the Indian National Congress. He was elected as a member of the Legislative Assembly of Meghalaya from the Sutnga Saipung Assembly constituency in 2018.
