= Mendipathar Assembly constituency =

Legislative Assembly constituency in Meghalaya State, India

Coordinates: 25.914°N 90.645°E

Mendipathar
- Constituency No. 38 for the Meghalaya Legislative Assembly

Constituency details
- Country: India
- Region: Northeast India
- State: Meghalaya
- District: North Garo Hills
- Lok Sabha constituency: Tura
- Established: 1972
- Total electors: 29,232
- Reservation: ST

Member of Legislative Assembly
- 11th Meghalaya Legislative Assembly
- Incumbent Marthon Sangma
- Party: AITC
- Elected year: 2023

Mendipathar is one of the 60 Legislative Assembly constituencies of Meghalaya state in India. It is part of North Garo Hills district and is reserved for candidates belonging to the Scheduled Tribes. It falls under Tura Lok Sabha constituency.

== Members of the Legislative Assembly ==
The list of MLAs are given below –

Year	Member	Party
1972	Sibendra Narayan Koch	Indian National Congress
1978	Beninstand G. Momin	All Party Hill Leaders Conference
1983	Beninstand G. Momin	All Party Hill Leaders Conference
1988	Beninstand G. Momin	Hill People's Union
1993	Frankenstein W. Momin	Indian National Congress
1998	Frankenstein W. Momin	Indian National Congress
2003	Beninstand G. Momin	United Democratic Party
2008	Frankenstein W. Momin	Indian National Congress
2013	Marthon Sangma	Nationalist Congress Party
2018	Marthon Sangma	Indian National Congress
2023	Marthon Sangma	National People's Party

== Election results ==
=== Assembly Election 2023 ===
2023 Meghalaya Legislative Assembly election: Mendipathar
Party	Candidate	Votes	%	±%
NPP	Marthon Sangma	9,363	37.85%	▲8.41
INC	Timjim K. Momin	5,538	22.39%	▼18.87
BJP	Sengnab Momin	4,132	16.70%	▲10.35
AITC	Pardinand D. Shira	3,312	13.39%	New
Gana Suraksha Party	Elbarth Marak	1,375	5.56%	New
UDP	Subrotho G Marak	1,017	4.11%	▼8.49
NOTA	None of the Above	194	0.78%	▼0.12
Margin of victory		3,825	15.46%	▲3.65
Turnout		24,737	84.62%	▼3.00
Registered electors		29,232		▲13.06
NPP gain from INC		Swing	▼3.40	

=== Assembly Election 2018 ===
2018 Meghalaya Legislative Assembly election: Mendipathar
Party	Candidate	Votes	%	±%
INC	Marthon Sangma	9,347	41.25%	▲10.76
NPP	Frankenstein W. Momin	6,670	29.44%	▲7.53
UDP	Comolsing R. Marak	2,855	12.60%	▼4.44
Independent	Elbarth Marak	1,912	8.44%	New
BJP	Digros D. Shira	1,440	6.36%	New
NOTA	None of the Above	204	0.90%	New
Margin of victory		2,677	11.82%	▲11.75
Turnout		22,657	87.63%	▲1.43
Registered electors		25,856		▲28.31
INC gain from NCP		Swing	▲10.70	

=== Assembly Election 2013 ===
2013 Meghalaya Legislative Assembly election: Mendipathar
Party	Candidate	Votes	%	±%
NCP	Marthon Sangma	5,307	30.55%	▲11.35
INC	Frankenstein W. Momin	5,296	30.49%	▲7.12
NPP	Dolly K. Sangma	3,806	21.91%	New
UDP	Beninstand G. Momin	2,960	17.04%	▼5.39
Margin of victory		11	0.06%	▼0.87
Turnout		17,369	86.19%	▼4.46
Registered electors		20,151		▼8.14
NCP gain from INC		Swing	▲7.19	

=== Assembly Election 2008 ===
2008 Meghalaya Legislative Assembly election: Mendipathar
Party	Candidate	Votes	%	±%
INC	Frankenstein W. Momin	4,647	23.37%	▼16.65
UDP	Beninstand G. Momin	4,461	22.43%	▼23.27
NCP	Marthon Sangma	3,819	19.20%	▲4.93
Independent	Dolly K. Sangma	3,492	17.56%	New
BJP	James Kumar Pam	2,984	15.00%	New
Independent	Nilbirth Sangma	484	2.43%	New
Margin of victory		186	0.94%	▼4.75
Turnout		19,887	90.66%	▲14.45
Registered electors		21,937		▼1.49
INC gain from UDP		Swing	▼22.34	

=== Assembly Election 2003 ===
2003 Meghalaya Legislative Assembly election: Mendipathar
Party	Candidate	Votes	%	±%
UDP	Beninstand G. Momin	7,756	45.70%	▲6.35
INC	Frankenstein W. Momin	6,791	40.02%	▼0.31
NCP	Silgring Marak	2,423	14.28%	New
Margin of victory		965	5.69%	▲4.72
Turnout		16,970	76.21%	▼0.32
Registered electors		22,269		▲13.66
UDP gain from INC		Swing		

=== Assembly Election 1998 ===
1998 Meghalaya Legislative Assembly election: Mendipathar
Party	Candidate	Votes	%	±%
INC	Frankenstein W. Momin	6,046	40.33%	▼9.59
UDP	Beninstand G. Momin	5,901	39.36%	New
Independent	Santosh Rava	3,046	20.32%	New
Margin of victory		145	0.97%	▼4.58
Turnout		14,993	79.26%	▼3.27
Registered electors		19,592		▲11.98
INC hold		Swing		

=== Assembly Election 1993 ===
1993 Meghalaya Legislative Assembly election: Mendipathar
Party	Candidate	Votes	%	±%
INC	Frankenstein W. Momin	6,969	49.92%	▲5.26
HPU	Beninstand G. Momin	6,195	44.37%	▼10.97
BJP	Samar Singh Rava	797	5.71%	New
Margin of victory		774	5.54%	▼5.15
Turnout		13,961	81.65%	▲1.17
Registered electors		17,496		▲31.06
INC gain from HPU		Swing		

=== Assembly Election 1988 ===
1988 Meghalaya Legislative Assembly election: Mendipathar
Party	Candidate	Votes	%	±%
HPU	Beninstand G. Momin	5,809	55.34%	New
INC	Jamindro R. Marak	4,687	44.66%	▲15.33
Margin of victory		1,122	10.69%	▲0.59
Turnout		10,496	81.70%	▲3.09
Registered electors		13,350		▲19.37
HPU gain from APHLC		Swing		

=== Assembly Election 1983 ===
1983 Meghalaya Legislative Assembly election: Mendipathar
Party	Candidate	Votes	%	±%
APHLC	Beninstand G. Momin	3,330	39.42%	▲2.39
INC	Frankenstein W. Momin	2,477	29.32%	▼7.41
Independent	Joshendro Rabha	1,960	23.20%	New
Independent	Luthunath J. Sangma	681	8.06%	New
Margin of victory		853	10.10%	▲9.80
Turnout		8,448	78.91%	▲23.26
Registered electors		11,184		▲44.91
APHLC hold		Swing	▲2.39	

=== Assembly Election 1978 ===
1978 Meghalaya Legislative Assembly election: Mendipathar
Party	Candidate	Votes	%	±%
APHLC	Beninstand G. Momin	1,494	37.03%	New
INC	Luthunath J. Sangma	1,482	36.73%	▼10.55
INC(I)	Josendra Rava	1,059	26.25%	New
Margin of victory		12	0.30%	▼14.54
Turnout		4,035	56.27%	▲10.22
Registered electors		7,718		▲41.20
APHLC gain from INC		Swing	▼10.26	

=== Assembly Election 1972 ===
1972 Meghalaya Legislative Assembly election: Mendipathar
Party	Candidate	Votes	%	±%
INC	Sibendra Narayan Koch	1,087	47.28%	New
Independent	Josendra Chrava	746	32.45%	New
Independent	Prandhan Sangma	466	20.27%	New
Margin of victory		341	14.83%	
Turnout		2,299	48.63%	
Registered electors		5,466		
INC win (new seat)				

== See also ==
- List of constituencies of the Meghalaya Legislative Assembly
- North Garo Hills district
- Tura (Lok Sabha constituency)
