= Kharkutta Assembly constituency =

Legislative Assembly constituency in Meghalaya State, India

Coordinates: 25.93°N 90.9°E

Kharkutta
- Constituency No. 37 for the Meghalaya Legislative Assembly

Constituency details
- Country: India
- Region: Northeast India
- State: Meghalaya
- District: North Garo Hills
- Lok Sabha constituency: Tura
- Established: 2003
- Total electors: 43,109
- Reservation: ST

Member of Legislative Assembly
- 11th Meghalaya Legislative Assembly
- Incumbent Rupert Momin
- Party: NPP
- Alliance: NDA
- Elected year: 2023

Kharkutta is one of the 60 Legislative Assembly constituencies of Meghalaya state in India.

It is part of North Garo Hills district and is reserved for candidates belonging to the Scheduled Tribes.

== Members of the Legislative Assembly ==
Election	Name	Party
1972	Pretting Tone Sangma	All Party Hill Leaders Conference
1978	Pretting Tone Sangma	Indian National Congress
1983	Pretting Tone Sangma	Indian National Congress
1988	Luderberg Ch. Momin	Hill People's Union
1993	Elstone D. Marak	Independent politician
1998	Elstone D. Marak	Indian National Congress
2003	Elstone D. Marak	Nationalist Congress Party
2008	Omillo K.Sangma	Nationalist Congress Party
2013	Cherak Watre Momin	Indian National Congress
2018	Rupert Momin	National People's Party
2023	Rupert Momin	National People's Party

== Election results ==
=== Assembly Election 2023 ===
2023 Meghalaya Legislative Assembly election: Kharkutta
Party	Candidate	Votes	%	±%
NPP	Rupert Momin	17,426	47.71%	▲2.46
AITC	Cherak Watre Momin	15,896	43.52%	New
INC	Chireng Peter R. Marak	1,746	4.78%	▼37.97
BJP	Elstone D. Marak	932	2.55%	▼2.54
UDP	Luderberg Ch. Momin	525	1.44%	▼0.28
NOTA	None of the Above	526	1.44%	▲0.63
Margin of victory		1,530	4.19%	▲1.69
Turnout		36,525	84.73%	▼2.37
Registered electors		43,109		▲15.94
NPP hold		Swing	▲2.46	

=== Assembly Election 2018 ===
2018 Meghalaya Legislative Assembly election: Kharkutta
Party	Candidate	Votes	%	±%
NPP	Rupert Momin	14,654	45.25%	▲19.97
INC	Cherak Watre Momin	13,845	42.75%	▲10.41
BJP	Synal M. Sangma	1,648	5.09%	▼5.65
NCP	Priyam Sangma	1,240	3.83%	New
UDP	Luderberg Ch. Momin	556	1.72%	▼5.42
NOTA	None of the Above	263	0.81%	New
Margin of victory		809	2.50%	▼4.56
Turnout		32,386	87.10%	▲2.41
Registered electors		37,183		▲31.67
NPP gain from INC		Swing	▲12.91	

=== Assembly Election 2013 ===
2013 Meghalaya Legislative Assembly election: Kharkutta
Party	Candidate	Votes	%	±%
INC	Cherak Watre Momin	7,733	32.34%	▲16.68
NPP	Omillo K. Sangma	6,046	25.28%	New
Independent	Rupert Momin	5,862	24.51%	New
BJP	Elstone D. Marak	2,567	10.73%	New
UDP	Luderberg Ch. Momin	1,706	7.13%	▼3.70
Margin of victory		1,687	7.05%	▲5.46
Turnout		23,914	84.68%	▼5.21
Registered electors		28,239		▲31.71
INC gain from NCP		Swing	▼0.99	

=== Assembly Election 2008 ===
2008 Meghalaya Legislative Assembly election: Kharkutta
Party	Candidate	Votes	%	±%
NCP	Omillo K.Sangma	6,424	33.33%	▼8.16
Independent	Rupert Momin	6,117	31.74%	New
INC	Elstone D.Marak	3,018	15.66%	▼4.75
UDP	Luderberg Ch.Momin	2,088	10.83%	▼1.86
Independent	Subash Marak	1,372	7.12%	New
Independent	Biporal K.Marak	256	1.33%	New
Margin of victory		307	1.59%	▼19.49
Turnout		19,275	89.90%	▲14.21
Registered electors		21,441		▲2.51
NCP hold		Swing	▼8.16	

=== Assembly Election 2003 ===
2003 Meghalaya Legislative Assembly election: Kharkutta
Party	Candidate	Votes	%	±%
NCP	Elstone D. Marak	6,568	41.49%	New
INC	Subash Marak	3,230	20.40%	▼28.02
Independent	Omillo K. Sangma	3,034	19.16%	New
UDP	Luderberg Ch. Momin	2,009	12.69%	▼5.01
Independent	Cary Marak	990	6.25%	New
Margin of victory		3,338	21.09%	▼7.44
Turnout		15,831	75.68%	▲4.41
Registered electors		20,917		▲14.17
NCP gain from INC		Swing	▼6.94	

=== Assembly Election 1998 ===
1998 Meghalaya Legislative Assembly election: Kharkutta
Party	Candidate	Votes	%	±%
INC	Elstone D. Marak	6,324	48.43%	▲26.25
Independent	Omillo K. Sangma	2,599	19.90%	New
UDP	Luderberg Ch. Momin	2,312	17.70%	New
Independent	Grithalson N. Aregh	1,581	12.11%	New
GNC	Birendro Sangma	243	1.86%	New
Margin of victory		3,725	28.52%	▲26.42
Turnout		13,059	74.18%	▼1.65
Registered electors		18,321		▲18.19
INC gain from Independent		Swing	▲20.06	

=== Assembly Election 1993 ===
1993 Meghalaya Legislative Assembly election: Kharkutta
Party	Candidate	Votes	%	±%
Independent	Elstone D. Marak	3,207	28.37%	New
HPU	Luderberg Ch. Momin	2,969	26.26%	▼17.92
INC	Kurendra D. Shira	2,507	22.18%	▼19.34
Independent	Omillo K. Sangma	2,306	20.40%	New
Independent	Earnest Momin	316	2.80%	New
Margin of victory		238	2.11%	▼0.57
Turnout		11,305	75.47%	▲7.62
Registered electors		15,501		▲28.17
Independent gain from HPU		Swing	▼15.81	

=== Assembly Election 1988 ===
1988 Meghalaya Legislative Assembly election: Kharkutta
Party	Candidate	Votes	%	±%
HPU	Luderberg Ch. Momin	3,490	44.18%	New
INC	Pretting Tone Sangma	3,279	41.51%	▼3.99
Independent	Earnest Momin	583	7.38%	New
Margin of victory		211	2.67%	▼16.68
Turnout		7,899	68.29%	▲7.02
Registered electors		12,094		▲8.87
HPU gain from INC		Swing		

=== Assembly Election 1983 ===
1983 Meghalaya Legislative Assembly election: Kharkutta
Party	Candidate	Votes	%	±%
INC	Pretting Tone Sangma	2,947	45.51%	▼4.31
Independent	Kurendra D. Shira	1,694	26.16%	New
APHLC	Luderberg Ch. Momin	1,089	16.82%	▼2.50
Independent	Sedinath G. Momin	599	9.25%	New
Independent	Earnest Momin	147	2.27%	New
Margin of victory		1,253	19.35%	▼2.09
Turnout		6,476	60.73%	▲4.22
Registered electors		11,109		▲35.84
INC hold		Swing	▼4.31	

=== Assembly Election 1978 ===
1978 Meghalaya Legislative Assembly election: Kharkutta
Party	Candidate	Votes	%	±%
INC	Pretting Tone Sangma	2,203	49.82%	New
Independent	Kurendra D.Shira	1,255	28.38%	New
APHLC	Milton Sangma	854	19.31%	▼34.66
Independent	Earnest Momin	110	2.49%	New
Margin of victory		948	21.44%	▼12.23
Turnout		4,422	57.46%	▲25.68
Registered electors		8,178		▲64.91
INC gain from APHLC		Swing	▼4.16	

=== Assembly Election 1972 ===
1972 Meghalaya Legislative Assembly election: Kharkutta
Party	Candidate	Votes	%	±%
APHLC	Pretting Tone Sangma	760	53.98%	New
Independent	Wetherson Monin	286	20.31%	New
Independent	Chemberlin Sangma	215	15.27%	New
Independent	Arnesh Momin	147	10.44%	New
Margin of victory		474	33.66%	
Turnout		1,408	29.93%	
Registered electors		4,959		
APHLC win (new seat)				

== See also ==
- List of constituencies of the Meghalaya Legislative Assembly
- North Garo Hills district
