= Robinus Syngkon =

Indian politician

Member of Meghalaya Legislative Assembly
- In office 2013–2018
- Preceded by: New Seat
- Succeeded by: Nujorki Sungoh
- Constituency: Mowkaiaw

Personal details
- Born: Robinus Syngkon
- Party: All India Trinamool Congress
- Parent: Dominie Nongbri (father)

Robinus Syngkon is an Indian politician. He was elected to the Meghalaya Legislative Assembly from Mowkaiaw in the 2013 Meghalaya Legislative Assembly election as a member of the Independents. He joined the Bharatiya Janata Party in 2018.
