= Samuel Sangma =

Indian politician

Samuel Sangma (born 1 January 1967) is an Indian politician from Meghalaya. He is former four time member of the Meghalaya Legislative Assembly. He won twice from the Dalu Assembly constituency, which is reserved for the Scheduled Tribe community, in the West Garo Hills district in 2003 representing Nationalist Congress Party, and in 2008 on Indian National Congress ticket. He won twice again from the Baghmara Assembly constituency, which is also a reserved set for ST community, in the South Garo Hills district, as an independent politician in 2013 and 2018.

== Ealy life ==
Sangma is from Baghmara, South Garo Hills district, Meghalaya. He is the son the late Mekenson Marak. He passed the bridge course for Class 12 (BPP) at Indira Gandhi National Open University under NEHU in 2012. He declared assets worth Rs.1 crore in 2013 and R.3 crore in 2023, in his affidavits to the Election Commission of India.

== Career ==
Sangma first won as an MLA winning the Baghmara, Meghalaya Assembly constituency in the 2013 Meghalaya Legislative Assembly election as an Independent candidate. He polled 7,728 and defeated his nearest rival, Sirgan A. Sangma,another independent candidate, by 3587 votes. He retained the seat in the 2018 Meghalaya Legislative Assembly election, also as an independent candidate, as he garnered 8070 votes and beat his closest rival, Sengnal N. Sangma of the NPEP, by 2,242 votes.
