= Mawkyrwat Assembly constituency =

Legislative Assembly constituency in Meghalaya State, India

Coordinates: 25.37°N 91.46°E

Mawkyrwat
- Constituency No. 36 for the Meghalaya Legislative Assembly

Constituency details
- Country: India
- Region: Northeast India
- State: Meghalaya
- District: South West Khasi Hills
- Lok Sabha constituency: Shillong
- Established: 2008
- Total electors: 37,565
- Reservation: ST

Member of Legislative Assembly
- 11th Meghalaya Legislative Assembly
- Incumbent Renikton Lyngdoh
- Party: United Democratic Party
- Elected year: 2023

Mawkyrwat is one of the 60 Legislative Assembly constituencies of Meghalaya state in India.

It is part of South West Khasi Hills district and is reserved for candidates belonging to the Scheduled Tribes. As of 2023, its representative is Renikton Lyngdoh Tongkhar of the United Democratic Party.

== Members of the Legislative Assembly ==
Election	Name	Party
1972	Rowell Lyngdoh	Independent politician
1978	Rowell Lyngdoh	Hill State People's Democratic Party
1983	Rowell Lyngdoh	Hill State People's Democratic Party
1988	Bires Nongsiej	Hill People's Union
1993	Rowell Lyngdoh	Indian National Congress
1998	B. Bires Nongsiej	United Democratic Party
2003	B. Bires Nongsiej	United Democratic Party
2008	Rowell Lyngdoh	Indian National Congress
2013	Rowell Lyngdoh	Indian National Congress
2018	Renikton Lyngdoh	Hill State People's Democratic Party
2023	Renikton Lyngdoh	United Democratic Party

== Election results ==
=== Assembly Election 2023 ===
2023 Meghalaya Legislative Assembly election: Mawkyrwat
Party	Candidate	Votes	%	±%
UDP	Renikton Lyngdoh	10,678	31.25%	New
INC	Carnes Sohshang	9,406	27.53%	▲3.93
HSPDP	Medalsing Lyngdoh	6,082	17.80%	▼7.51
AITC	Sounder Strong Cajee	4,579	13.40%	New
NPP	H. Stalyne Diengdoh	3,207	9.39%	▼5.70
NOTA	None of the Above	130	0.38%	▲0.02
Margin of victory		1,272	3.72%	▲2.01
Turnout		34,170	90.96%	▲3.37
Registered electors		37,565		▲22.89
UDP gain from HSPDP		Swing	▲5.94	

=== Assembly Election 2018 ===
2018 Meghalaya Legislative Assembly election: Mawkyrwat
Party	Candidate	Votes	%	±%
HSPDP	Renikton Lyngdoh	6,777	25.31%	▲3.67
INC	Carnes Sohshang	6,319	23.60%	▼2.53
NPP	Rowell Lyngdoh	4,038	15.08%	▼4.26
PDF	Hadrian Lyngdoh	4,009	14.97%	New
KHNAM	Enbin Kharraswai	3,613	13.49%	▲9.49
BJP	Polanding Sohphoh	680	2.54%	New
Independent	Dr. Bestondar C. Lyngdoh	470	1.76%	New
NOTA	None of the Above	97	0.36%	New
Margin of victory		458	1.71%	▼2.51
Turnout		26,775	87.59%	▼4.62
Registered electors		30,568		▲22.26
HSPDP gain from INC		Swing	▼0.82	

=== Assembly Election 2013 ===
2013 Meghalaya Legislative Assembly election: Mawkyrwat
Party	Candidate	Votes	%	±%
INC	Rowell Lyngdoh	6,024	26.13%	▼5.91
Independent	Hadrian Lyngdoh	5,050	21.90%	New
HSPDP	Enbin Kharraswai	4,990	21.64%	▼3.10
NPP	Renikton Lyngdoh	4,459	19.34%	New
UDP	B. Bires Nongsiej	1,371	5.95%	▼14.50
KHNAM	Handar Wanniang	924	4.01%	New
LJP	Alexander Marwein	140	0.61%	▲0.07
Margin of victory		974	4.22%	▼3.06
Turnout		23,056	92.21%	▼0.01
Registered electors		25,003		▲26.53
INC hold		Swing	▼5.91	

=== Assembly Election 2008 ===
2008 Meghalaya Legislative Assembly election: Mawkyrwat
Party	Candidate	Votes	%	±%
INC	Rowell Lyngdoh	5,838	32.03%	▲9.03
HSPDP	Enbin Kharraswai	4,510	24.75%	▲6.91
NCP	Hadrian Lyngdoh	3,915	21.48%	▲19.72
UDP	B. Bires Nongsiej	3,727	20.45%	▼10.79
LJP	Alexander Marwein	97	0.53%	New
CPI	Kerlang Kupar Mawlong	70	0.38%	New
Independent	Endro Iawphniaw	68	0.37%	New
Margin of victory		1,328	7.29%	▼0.95
Turnout		18,225	92.23%	▲14.47
Registered electors		19,761		▼2.10
INC gain from UDP		Swing	▲0.79	

=== Assembly Election 2003 ===
2003 Meghalaya Legislative Assembly election: Mawkyrwat
Party	Candidate	Votes	%	±%
UDP	B. Bires Nongsiej	4,903	31.24%	▲1.13
INC	Rowell Lyngdoh	3,610	23.00%	▼5.87
HSPDP	Bresterwell Nongsiej	2,799	17.83%	▼9.94
MDP	Enbin Kharraswai	2,479	15.79%	New
KHNAM	Bib Edwin Wanniang	1,384	8.82%	New
NCP	Shanborlin Lyngdoh	277	1.76%	New
BJP	Endro Iawphniaw	169	1.08%	New
Margin of victory		1,293	8.24%	▲7.01
Turnout		15,695	77.76%	▼1.61
Registered electors		20,184		▲13.54
UDP hold		Swing	▲1.13	

=== Assembly Election 1998 ===
1998 Meghalaya Legislative Assembly election: Mawkyrwat
Party	Candidate	Votes	%	±%
UDP	B. Bires Nongsiej	4,248	30.11%	New
INC	Rowell Lyngdoh	4,074	28.87%	▼6.10
HSPDP	Bresterwell Nongsiej	3,919	27.77%	▼3.95
Independent	Bib Edwin Wanniang	1,770	12.54%	New
CPI	Nimton Lyngdoh	99	0.70%	New
Margin of victory		174	1.23%	▼0.43
Turnout		14,110	80.91%	▼0.64
Registered electors		17,777		▼0.38
UDP gain from INC		Swing	▼4.86	

=== Assembly Election 1993 ===
1993 Meghalaya Legislative Assembly election: Mawkyrwat
Party	Candidate	Votes	%	±%
INC	Rowell Lyngdoh	4,993	34.97%	▲7.53
HPU	B. Bires Nongsiej	4,755	33.30%	▼4.42
HSPDP	E. Garland Royal Shyiem	4,530	31.73%	▲7.92
Margin of victory		238	1.67%	▼8.62
Turnout		14,278	81.12%	▲0.89
Registered electors		17,845		▲22.21
INC gain from HPU		Swing		

=== Assembly Election 1988 ===
1988 Meghalaya Legislative Assembly election: Mawkyrwat
Party	Candidate	Votes	%	±%
HPU	Bires Nongsiej	4,359	37.73%	New
INC	Rowell Lyngdoh	3,170	27.44%	▼0.63
HSPDP	Endro Iawphniaw	2,751	23.81%	▼5.31
Independent	Bim Edwin Wanniang Marbaniaw	1,234	10.68%	New
Independent	E. Garland Royal Syiem	40	0.35%	New
Margin of victory		1,189	10.29%	▲9.23
Turnout		11,554	80.44%	▲6.43
Registered electors		14,602		▲24.86
HPU gain from HSPDP		Swing	▲8.60	

=== Assembly Election 1983 ===
1983 Meghalaya Legislative Assembly election: Mawkyrwat
Party	Candidate	Votes	%	±%
HSPDP	Rowell Lyngdoh	2,476	29.12%	▼22.04
INC	E. Garland Royal Syiem	2,386	28.06%	▲4.66
APHLC	Bires Nongsiej	1,970	23.17%	▼1.65
Independent	Endroshon Lawphniaw	1,670	19.64%	New
Margin of victory		90	1.06%	▼25.28
Turnout		8,502	75.48%	▲1.43
Registered electors		11,695		▲7.55
HSPDP hold		Swing	▼22.04	

=== Assembly Election 1978 ===
1978 Meghalaya Legislative Assembly election: Mawkyrwat
Party	Candidate	Votes	%	±%
HSPDP	Rowell Lyngdoh	3,965	51.16%	New
APHLC	Rendarson K. Ryaj	1,924	24.83%	▼6.18
INC	A. Herkling Thongny	1,814	23.41%	New
Independent	R. Kingwas Mawlier	47	0.61%	New
Margin of victory		2,041	26.34%	▼6.27
Turnout		7,750	72.78%	▲12.98
Registered electors		10,874		▲91.38
HSPDP gain from Independent		Swing	▼12.46	

=== Assembly Election 1972 ===
1972 Meghalaya Legislative Assembly election: Mawkyrwat
Party	Candidate	Votes	%	±%
Independent	Rowell Lyngdoh	2,107	63.62%	New
APHLC	Garland Royal	1,027	31.01%	New
Independent	R. Kingwas Mawlier	178	5.37%	New
Margin of victory		1,080	32.61%	
Turnout		3,312	59.33%	
Registered electors		5,682		
Independent win (new seat)				

== See also ==
- List of constituencies of the Meghalaya Legislative Assembly
- South West Khasi Hills district
