= Sutnga Saipung Assembly constituency =

Legislative Assembly constituency in Meghalaya State, India

Coordinates: 25.37°N 92.44°E

Sutnga Saipung
- Constituency No. 5 for the Meghalaya Legislative Assembly

Constituency details
- Country: India
- Region: Northeast India
- State: Meghalaya
- District: East Jaintia Hills
- Lok Sabha constituency: Shillong
- Established: 1972
- Total electors: 46,973
- Reservation: ST

Member of Legislative Assembly
- 11th Meghalaya Legislative Assembly
- Incumbent Santa Mary Shylla
- Party: NPP
- Alliance: NDA
- Elected year: 2023

Sutnga Saipung is one of the 60 Legislative Assembly constituencies of Meghalaya state in India. It is part of East Jaintia Hills district and is reserved for candidates belonging to the Scheduled Tribes. It falls under Shillong Lok Sabha constituency and its current MLA is Santa Mary Shylla of National People's Party.

== Members of the Legislative Assembly ==
Election	Member	Party
2013	Hopeful Bamon	Independent politician
2018	Shitlang Pale	Indian National Congress
2023	Santa Mary Shylla	National People's Party

== Election results ==
=== Assembly Election 2023 ===
2023 Meghalaya Legislative Assembly election: Sutnga Saipung
Party	Candidate	Votes	%	±%
NPP	Santa Mary Shylla	16,974	39.48%	▲8.33
INC	Vincent H. Pala	15,146	35.23%	▼0.54
UDP	Shitlang Pale	10,453	24.31%	New
BJP	Krison Langstang	424	0.99%	▼20.68
NOTA	None of the Above	416	0.97%	▲0.41
Margin of victory		1,828	4.25%	▼0.37
Turnout		42,997	92.42%	▲1.26
Registered electors		46,973		▲23.75
NPP gain from INC		Swing	▲3.71	

=== Assembly Election 2018 ===
2018 Meghalaya Legislative Assembly election: Sutnga Saipung
Party	Candidate	Votes	%	±%
INC	Shitlang Pale	12,257	35.77%	▼8.12
NPP	Hopeful Bamon	10,673	31.15%	New
BJP	Hambertus Nongtdu	7,423	21.66%	New
HSPDP	Defender Pakem	2,800	8.17%	New
Independent	Skindro Dkhar	534	1.56%	New
NOTA	None of the Above	192	0.56%	New
Margin of victory		1,584	4.62%	▼0.41
Turnout		34,266	90.27%	▼1.85
Registered electors		37,959		▲20.42
INC gain from Independent		Swing	▼13.15	

=== Assembly Election 2013 ===
2013 Meghalaya Legislative Assembly election: Sutnga Saipung
Party	Candidate	Votes	%	±%
Independent	Hopeful Bamon	14,205	48.92%	New
INC	Shitlang Pale	12,743	43.89%	New
UDP	Dr. Mongol Singh Tyngkra	2,088	7.19%	New
Margin of victory		1,462	5.04%	
Turnout		29,036	92.12%	
Registered electors		31,521		
Independent win (new seat)				

== See also ==
- List of constituencies of the Meghalaya Legislative Assembly
- East Jaintia Hills district
- Shillong (Lok Sabha constituency)
