= Kartush Marak =

Indian politician

Kartush R. Marak (born 1977) is an Indian politician from Meghalaya. He is a member of the Meghalaya Legislative Assembly from the Baghmara Assembly constituency, which is reserved for Scheduled Tribe community, in South Garo Hills district. He was first elected in the 2023 Meghalaya Legislative Assembly election as an independent politician.

== Early life and education ==
Marak is from Gasuapara village, South Garo Hills District, Meghalaya. He is the son of the late Soilendro G. Momin. He studied Class 10 at Dalu Government High School, Dalu in 1996 and passed the Secondary School Leaving Certificate examinations conducted by the Meghalaya Board of School Education.

== Career ==
Marak won the Baghmara Assembly constituency as an independent candidate in the 2023 Meghalaya Legislative Assembly election. He polled 9,013 votes and defeated his nearest rival, Samuel M. Sangma of the Bharatiya Janata Party, by a margin of 2,225 votes.
