= Mairang Assembly constituency =

Legislative Assembly constituency in Meghalaya State, India

Coordinates: 25.56°N 91.64°E

Mairang
- Constituency No. 30 for the Meghalaya Legislative Assembly

Constituency details
- Country: India
- Region: Northeast India
- State: Meghalaya
- District: Eastern West Khasi Hills
- Lok Sabha constituency: Shillong
- Established: 1972
- Total electors: 37,189
- Reservation: ST

Member of Legislative Assembly
- 11th Meghalaya Legislative Assembly
- Incumbent Metbah Lyngdoh
- Party: UDP
- Alliance: NDA
- Elected year: 2023

Mairang is one of the 60 Legislative Assembly constituencies of Meghalaya state in India.

It is part of Eastern West Khasi Hills district and is reserved for candidates belonging to the Scheduled Tribes.

== Members of the Legislative Assembly ==
Election	Name	Party
1972	Fuller Lyngdoh Mawnai	Independent politician
1978	Fuller Lyngdoh Mawnai	Hill State People's Democratic Party
1983	Kitdor Syiem	All Party Hill Leaders Conference
1988	Fuller Lyngdon Mawnai	Hill State People's Democratic Party
1993	Kitdor Syiem	Indian National Congress
1998	Kitdor Syiem	Indian National Congress
2003	Boldness L. Nongrum	Indian National Congress
2008	Metbah Lyngdoh	United Democratic Party
2013	Metbah Lyngdoh	United Democratic Party
2018	Metbah Lyngdoh	United Democratic Party
2023	Metbah Lyngdoh	United Democratic Party

== Election results ==
=== Assembly Election 2023 ===
2023 Meghalaya Legislative Assembly election: Mairang
Party	Candidate	Votes	%	±%
UDP	Metbah Lyngdoh	19,066	48.68%	▲15.66
INC	Batskhem Ryntathiang	18,911	48.28%	▲29.26
VPP	Shanlang Warjri	944	2.41%	New
BJP	Mark Rinaldy Sawkmie	245	0.63%	▼6.74
NOTA	None of the Above	116	0.30%	▼0.69
Margin of victory		155	0.40%	▼8.59
Turnout		39,166	92.37%	▼0.41
Registered electors		42,402		▲21.29
UDP hold		Swing	▲15.66	

=== Assembly Election 2018 ===
2018 Meghalaya Legislative Assembly election: Mairang
Party	Candidate	Votes	%	±%
UDP	Metbah Lyngdoh	10,710	33.02%	▼19.66
PDF	Councellor Singh Wahlang	7,796	24.04%	New
INC	Eureka F.P. Lyngdoh	6,170	19.02%	▼27.46
NPP	Lawanpynshngain K. War	4,530	13.97%	New
BJP	Kestonbel Manik Syiemlieh	2,390	7.37%	New
NOTA	None of the Above	320	0.99%	New
Margin of victory		2,914	8.98%	▲2.78
Turnout		32,436	92.78%	▲1.81
Registered electors		34,960		▲22.06
UDP hold		Swing	▼19.66	

=== Assembly Election 2013 ===
2013 Meghalaya Legislative Assembly election: Mairang
Party	Candidate	Votes	%	±%
UDP	Metbah Lyngdoh	13,726	52.68%	▲8.28
INC	Eureka F.P. Lyngdoh	12,110	46.48%	▲9.89
MDP	Bokstar Nongrang	219	0.84%	▼2.01
Margin of victory		1,616	6.20%	▼1.62
Turnout		26,055	90.97%	▼1.58
Registered electors		28,641		▲10.60
UDP hold		Swing		

=== Assembly Election 2008 ===
2008 Meghalaya Legislative Assembly election: Mairang
Party	Candidate	Votes	%	±%
UDP	Metbah Lyngdoh	10,642	44.40%	▲29.88
INC	Boldness L. Nongrum	8,768	36.58%	▲8.05
NCP	Dr. Bibilynda Wahlang	3,506	14.63%	▲7.19
MDP	Grossper Ryntathiang	683	2.85%	▼20.35
HSPDP	Budshell Marbaniang	226	0.94%	▼23.52
LJP	Venantius Lyngdoh Peinlang	142	0.59%	New
Margin of victory		1,874	7.82%	▲3.75
Turnout		23,967	92.55%	▲16.15
Registered electors		25,896		▲0.92
UDP gain from INC		Swing	▲15.87	

=== Assembly Election 2003 ===
2003 Meghalaya Legislative Assembly election: Mairang
Party	Candidate	Votes	%	±%
INC	Boldness L. Nongrum	5,594	28.53%	▼9.15
HSPDP	Fuller Lyngdoh Mawnai	4,796	24.46%	▼5.46
MDP	Rasor Rani	4,549	23.20%	New
UDP	Srimshon Roy Ryntathiang	2,847	14.52%	▼7.74
NCP	Roslin Lyngdoh Mawlong	1,458	7.44%	New
KHNAM	Tarcisious Mawlot	360	1.84%	New
Margin of victory		798	4.07%	▼3.69
Turnout		19,604	76.41%	▲1.49
Registered electors		25,659		▲15.71
INC hold		Swing	▼9.15	

=== Assembly Election 1998 ===
1998 Meghalaya Legislative Assembly election: Mairang
Party	Candidate	Votes	%	±%
INC	Kitdor Syiem	6,261	37.69%	▼16.25
HSPDP	Fuller Lyngdoh Mawnai	4,971	29.92%	▼4.22
UDP	Srimshon Roy Ryntathiang	3,699	22.27%	New
PDM	Suresh Kharmuti	1,301	7.83%	New
BJP	Phores Mairang	211	1.27%	New
Independent	Tarcisious Mawlot	169	1.02%	New
Margin of victory		1,290	7.77%	▼12.04
Turnout		16,612	76.75%	▼8.71
Registered electors		22,175		▲12.27
INC hold		Swing	▼16.25	

=== Assembly Election 1993 ===
1993 Meghalaya Legislative Assembly election: Mairang
Party	Candidate	Votes	%	±%
INC	Kitdor Syiem	8,910	53.94%	▲52.12
HSPDP	Fuller Lyngdoh Mawnai	5,639	34.14%	▼17.22
AHL(AM)	Theophilus Lyngdoh	1,732	10.49%	New
JP	Phores Mairang	236	1.43%	New
Margin of victory		3,271	19.80%	▲15.25
Turnout		16,517	85.11%	▲1.51
Registered electors		19,752		▲32.16
INC gain from HSPDP		Swing	▲2.58	

=== Assembly Election 1988 ===
1988 Meghalaya Legislative Assembly election: Mairang
Party	Candidate	Votes	%	±%
HSPDP	Fuller Lyngdon Mawnai	6,303	51.37%	▲27.41
Independent	Kitdor Syiem	5,744	46.81%	New
INC	Hesstanley Syiemlieh	224	1.83%	▼10.77
Margin of victory		559	4.56%	▼16.21
Turnout		12,271	85.00%	▲9.63
Registered electors		14,945		▲19.06
HSPDP gain from APHLC		Swing		

=== Assembly Election 1983 ===
1983 Meghalaya Legislative Assembly election: Mairang
Party	Candidate	Votes	%	±%
APHLC	Kitdor Syiem	4,068	44.72%	▲17.14
HSPDP	Fuller Lyngdoh Mawnai	2,179	23.95%	▼28.79
Independent	Sodrek Marwein	1,273	13.99%	New
INC	Swollyshon Wahlang	1,146	12.60%	▼3.70
Independent	Phrestar Syiemlieh	431	4.74%	New
Margin of victory		1,889	20.77%	▼4.40
Turnout		9,097	76.82%	▲13.54
Registered electors		12,552		▲11.61
APHLC gain from HSPDP		Swing	▼8.03	

=== Assembly Election 1978 ===
1978 Meghalaya Legislative Assembly election: Mairang
Party	Candidate	Votes	%	±%
HSPDP	Fuller Lyngdoh Mawnai	3,496	52.75%	New
APHLC	Irad Manik Syiem	1,828	27.58%	▼7.40
INC	Kaldran Ryntathiang	1,080	16.29%	New
Independent	Lombard Manick Syiem	224	3.38%	New
Margin of victory		1,668	25.17%	▲1.93
Turnout		6,628	60.71%	▲3.98
Registered electors		11,246		▲79.10
HSPDP gain from Independent		Swing	▼5.47	

=== Assembly Election 1972 ===
1972 Meghalaya Legislative Assembly election: Mairang
Party	Candidate	Votes	%	±%
Independent	Fuller Lyngdoh Mawnai	2,009	58.22%	New
APHLC	Irad Manik Syiem	1,207	34.98%	New
Independent	Ochondro Singh Syiemlieh	235	6.81%	New
Margin of victory		802	23.24%	
Turnout		3,451	57.35%	
Registered electors		6,279		
Independent win (new seat)				

== See also ==
- List of constituencies of the Meghalaya Legislative Assembly
