= Dalu Assembly constituency =

Legislative Assembly constituency in Meghalaya State, India

Coordinates: 25.21°N 90.23°E

Dalu
- Constituency No. 57 for the Meghalaya Legislative Assembly

Constituency details
- Country: India
- Region: Northeast India
- State: Meghalaya
- District: West Garo Hills
- Lok Sabha constituency: Tura
- Established: 2003
- Total electors: 22,157
- Reservation: ST

Member of Legislative Assembly
- 11th Meghalaya Legislative Assembly
- Incumbent Brening Sangma
- Party: NPP
- Alliance: NDA
- Elected year: 2023

Dalu Legislative Assembly constituency is one of the 60 Legislative Assembly constituencies of Meghalaya state in India.

It is part of West Garo Hills district and is reserved for candidates belonging to the Scheduled Tribes. As of 2023, it is represented by Brening Sangma of the National People's Party.

== Members of the Legislative Assembly ==
Election	Name	Party
1972	Nimosh Sangma	All Party Hill Leaders Conference
1978	Mukul Das	Independent politician
1983	Kamal R. Bhowmik	Indian National Congress
1988	Mountabatien K. Sangma	Indian National Congress
1993	Archibold A. Sangma	Indian National Congress
1998	Nityanarayan Smchang	Bharatiya Janata Party
2003	Samuel Sangma	Nationalist Congress Party
2008	Samuel Sangma	Indian National Congress
2013	Kenethson Sangma	Indian National Congress
2018	Brening Sangma	National People's Party
2023	Brening Sangma	National People's Party

== Election results ==
=== Assembly Election 2023 ===
2023 Meghalaya Legislative Assembly election: Dalu
Party	Candidate	Votes	%	±%
NPP	Brening Sangma	5,834	31.07%	▲6.14
BJP	Akki A Sangma	5,307	28.26%	▲8.15
AITC	Sengkal A Sangma	3,104	16.53%	New
Independent	Sarbha R. Marak	2,069	11.02%	New
Independent	Promod S. Koch	694	3.70%	New
UDP	Kenethson Sangma	635	3.38%	▼10.94
RPI(A)	Panseng R. Marak	447	2.38%	New
NOTA	None of the Above	1,622	8.64%	▲7.80
Margin of victory		527	2.81%	▼1.97
Turnout		18,778	84.75%	▼3.32
Registered electors		22,157		▲18.87
NPP hold		Swing	▲6.14	

=== Assembly Election 2018 ===
2018 Meghalaya Legislative Assembly election: Dalu
Party	Candidate	Votes	%	±%
NPP	Brening Sangma	4,092	24.93%	New
INC	Kenethson Sangma	3,308	20.15%	▼3.37
BJP	Kurosh M. Marak	3,302	20.11%	▲8.94
UDP	Sengkal A Sangma	2,352	14.33%	New
NCP	Dorendro M. Sangma	1,676	10.21%	New
Independent	Moromi K. Marak	1,007	6.13%	New
Independent	Silgra N. Marak	419	2.55%	New
NOTA	None of the Above	138	0.84%	New
Margin of victory		784	4.78%	▲1.43
Turnout		16,417	88.07%	▼1.16
Registered electors		18,640		▲16.32
NPP gain from INC		Swing	▲1.41	

=== Assembly Election 2013 ===
2013 Meghalaya Legislative Assembly election: Dalu
Party	Candidate	Votes	%	±%
INC	Kenethson Sangma	3,363	23.52%	▼12.02
SP	Brening Sangma	2,885	20.17%	New
Independent	Kurosh M. Marak	2,548	17.82%	New
Independent	Sengkal A Sangma	2,033	14.22%	New
BJP	Sisir Marak	1,598	11.17%	▲9.51
GNC	Bolison D. Sangma	1,111	7.77%	New
Independent	Joyferry N. Sangma	762	5.33%	New
Margin of victory		478	3.34%	▲1.31
Turnout		14,300	89.24%	▼2.09
Registered electors		16,025		▲6.45
INC hold		Swing	▼12.02	

=== Assembly Election 2008 ===
2008 Meghalaya Legislative Assembly election: Dalu
Party	Candidate	Votes	%	±%
INC	Samuel Sangma	4,886	35.54%	▲21.23
Independent	Nityanarayan Smchang	4,606	33.50%	New
NCP	Panseng R. Marak	3,146	22.88%	▼11.11
UDP	Gopal A. Sangma	478	3.48%	New
BJP	Godwin D. Shira	229	1.67%	▼29.91
Independent	Jan N. Arengh	228	1.66%	New
LJP	Chris Kabul A. Sangma	175	1.27%	New
Margin of victory		280	2.04%	▼0.39
Turnout		13,748	91.32%	▲19.42
Registered electors		15,054		▼2.13
INC gain from NCP		Swing	▲1.54	

=== Assembly Election 2003 ===
2003 Meghalaya Legislative Assembly election: Dalu
Party	Candidate	Votes	%	±%
NCP	Samuel Sangma	3,760	34.00%	New
BJP	Nityanarayan Smchang	3,492	31.57%	▼5.40
Independent	Archibold A. Sangma	1,904	17.22%	New
INC	Panseng R. Marak	1,583	14.31%	▼19.83
Independent	Premananda Sangma	321	2.90%	New
Margin of victory		268	2.42%	▼0.41
Turnout		11,060	71.90%	▼1.90
Registered electors		15,382		▲7.21
NCP gain from BJP		Swing	▼2.98	

=== Assembly Election 1998 ===
1998 Meghalaya Legislative Assembly election: Dalu
Party	Candidate	Votes	%	±%
BJP	Nityanarayan Smchang	3,915	36.97%	▲27.48
INC	Archibold Sangma	3,615	34.14%	▼10.65
Independent	Tapseng Sangma	2,416	22.82%	New
Independent	Mountabatien K. Sangma	330	3.12%	New
GNC	Anthony Marak	244	2.30%	New
UDP	Piterlawford Marak	69	0.65%	New
Margin of victory		300	2.83%	▼16.58
Turnout		10,589	75.35%	▼7.80
Registered electors		14,347		▲13.24
BJP gain from INC		Swing	▼7.81	

=== Assembly Election 1993 ===
1993 Meghalaya Legislative Assembly election: Dalu
Party	Candidate	Votes	%	±%
INC	Archibold A. Sangma	4,631	44.79%	▲10.31
AHL(AM)	Nityanarayan Smchang	2,624	25.38%	New
MPPP	Mountabatien K. Sangma	1,119	10.82%	New
HPU	Anthony Marak	985	9.53%	▼14.62
BJP	Beharon Sangma	981	9.49%	New
Margin of victory		2,007	19.41%	▲9.08
Turnout		10,340	83.15%	▲2.74
Registered electors		12,670		▲25.48
INC hold		Swing	▲10.31	

=== Assembly Election 1988 ===
1988 Meghalaya Legislative Assembly election: Dalu
Party	Candidate	Votes	%	±%
INC	Mountabatien K. Sangma	2,746	34.48%	▲4.54
HPU	Archibold A. Sangma	1,923	24.15%	New
Independent	Nityanarayan Smchang	1,915	24.05%	New
CPI	Robin Rema	840	10.55%	▲4.02
Independent	Ronald Marak	540	6.78%	New
Margin of victory		823	10.33%	▼0.16
Turnout		7,964	81.30%	▲4.87
Registered electors		10,097		▲20.20
INC hold		Swing	▲4.54	

=== Assembly Election 1983 ===
1983 Meghalaya Legislative Assembly election: Dalu
Party	Candidate	Votes	%	±%
INC	Kamal R. Bhowmik	1,861	29.94%	▲6.04
Independent	Mukul Das	1,209	19.45%	New
Independent	Nimosh Sangma	923	14.85%	New
Independent	Aboni Hajong	884	14.22%	New
APHLC	Momindra Marak	420	6.76%	▼13.35
CPI	Nipendralal Misra	406	6.53%	▼3.33
Independent	Probir Raksam	340	5.47%	New
Margin of victory		652	10.49%	▲8.67
Turnout		6,216	76.76%	▲7.43
Registered electors		8,400		▲8.12
INC gain from Independent		Swing	▲4.22	

=== Assembly Election 1978 ===
1978 Meghalaya Legislative Assembly election: Dalu
Party	Candidate	Votes	%	±%
Independent	Mukul Das	1,330	25.72%	New
INC	Nimosh Sangma	1,236	23.90%	New
APHLC	Lamberth K. Sangma	1,040	20.11%	▼47.13
INC(I)	Anukul Chandra Marak	925	17.88%	New
CPI	Robin Rema	510	9.86%	New
Independent	Samir Ranjan Bhattacharjee	131	2.53%	New
Margin of victory		94	1.82%	▼32.65
Turnout		5,172	69.66%	▲18.39
Registered electors		7,769		▲35.82
Independent gain from APHLC		Swing	▼41.52	

=== Assembly Election 1972 ===
1972 Meghalaya Legislative Assembly election: Dalu
Party	Candidate	Votes	%	±%
APHLC	Nimosh Sangma	1,853	67.24%	New
Independent	Lamberth K. Sangma	903	32.76%	New
Margin of victory		950	34.47%	
Turnout		2,756	52.01%	
Registered electors		5,720		
APHLC win (new seat)				

== See also ==
- List of constituencies of the Meghalaya Legislative Assembly
- West Garo Hills district
