= Renikton Lyngdoh =

Indian politician

Renikton Lyngdoh Tongkhar (born 26 February 1972) is an Indian politician from Meghalaya. He is a member of the Meghalaya Legislative Assembly from the Mawkyrwat Assembly constituency, which is reserved for Scheduled Tribe community, in South West Khasi Hills district. He won the 2023 Meghalaya Legislative Assembly election representing the United Democratic Party (Meghalaya).

== Early life and education ==
Lyngdoh is from Mawkyrwat, South West Khasi Hills district, Meghalaya. He is the son of Roni Nongsiej. He completed his B.Com. in 1995 at a college affiliated with North Eastern Hill University.

== Career ==
Lyngdoh was first elected as an MLA winning the 2018 Meghalaya Legislative Assembly election representing the Hill State People's Democratic Party defeating Sohshang of the Congress by 458 votes. He was reelected from the Mawkyrwat Assembly constituency representing the United Democratic Party in the 2023 Meghalaya Legislative Assembly election, polling 10,678 votes and defeating his nearest rival, Carnes Sohshang of the Indian National Congress, by a margin of 1,272 votes.

In January 2023, he resigned from the assembly and later joined the United Democratic Party. Earlier in August 2021, the government formed a committee to resolve the border disputes with Assam, headed by the then Public Health Engineering minister Lyngdoh Tongkhar which submitted its report in December 2023.
