= Ampati Assembly constituency =

Legislative Assembly constituency in Meghalaya State, India

Coordinates: 25.47°N 89.93°E

Ampati
- Constituency No. 53 for the Meghalaya Legislative Assembly

Constituency details
- Country: India
- Region: Northeast India
- State: Meghalaya
- District: South West Garo Hills
- Lok Sabha constituency: Tura
- Established: 2008
- Total electors: 33,101
- Reservation: ST

Member of Legislative Assembly
- 11th Meghalaya Legislative Assembly
- Incumbent Miani D Shira
- Party: Mamata All India Trinamool Congress
- Elected year: 2023

Ampati is one of the 60 Legislative Assembly constituencies of Meghalaya state in India.

It is part of South West Garo Hills district and is reserved for candidates belonging to the Scheduled Tribes.

== Members of the Legislative Assembly ==
Year	Member	Party
Ampatigiri
1972	Jagabandhu Barman	Indian National Congress
1978	Bhadreswar Koch	Indian National Congress
1983	Bhadreswar Koch	Indian National Congress
1988	Monendro Agitok	Independent politician
1993	Dr. Mukul Sangma	Independent politician
1998	Dr. Mukul Sangma	Indian National Congress
2003	Dr. Mukul Sangma	Indian National Congress
2008	Dr. Mukul Sangma	Indian National Congress
Ampati
2013	Dr. Mukul Sangma	Indian National Congress
2018	Dr. Mukul Sangma	Indian National Congress
2023	Miani D Shira	All India Trinamool Congress

== Election results ==
=== Assembly Election 2023 ===
2023 Meghalaya Legislative Assembly election: Ampati
Party	Candidate	Votes	%	±%
AITC	Miani D Shira	13,446	45.04%	New
NPP	Stevie M. Marak	11,169	37.41%	New
BJP	Premananda Koch	4,762	15.95%	▼16.82
INC	Uttora Guri Sangma	476	1.59%	▼62.00
NOTA	None of the Above	233	0.78%	▼0.01
Margin of victory		2,277	7.63%	▼23.19
Turnout		29,853	90.19%	▼1.52
Registered electors		33,101		▲15.44
AITC gain from INC		Swing	▼18.55	

=== Assembly Election 2018 ===
2018 Meghalaya Legislative Assembly election: Ampati
Party	Candidate	Votes	%	±%
INC	Dr. Mukul Sangma	16,721	63.59%	▼5.08
BJP	Bakul Ch. Hajong	8,617	32.77%	New
Independent	Joyanto K Marak	546	2.08%	New
NOTA	None of the Above	208	0.79%	New
Margin of victory		8,104	30.82%	▼10.73
Turnout		26,295	91.71%	▲1.29
Registered electors		28,673		▲18.44
INC hold		Swing	▼5.08	

=== Assembly Election 2013 ===
2013 Meghalaya Legislative Assembly election: Ampati
Party	Candidate	Votes	%	±%
INC	Dr. Mukul Sangma	15,031	68.67%	New
NPP	Clement G. Momin	5,935	27.11%	New
Independent	Mahiran Hajong	924	4.22%	New
Margin of victory		9,096	41.55%	
Turnout		21,890	90.42%	
Registered electors		24,209		
INC win (new seat)				

=== Assembly Election 2008 ===
2008 Meghalaya Legislative Assembly election: Ampatigiri
Party	Candidate	Votes	%	±%
INC	Dr. Mukul Sangma	10,626	55.47%	▲14.48
NCP	Clement G. Momin	7,660	39.99%	▲11.38
Independent	Monendro Agitok	510	2.66%	New
UDP	Dharmeswar Koch	360	1.88%	New
Margin of victory		2,966	15.48%	▲3.10
Turnout		19,156	90.53%	▲13.33
Registered electors		21,161		▼5.41
INC hold		Swing	▲14.48	

=== Assembly Election 2003 ===
2003 Meghalaya Legislative Assembly election: Ampatigiri
Party	Candidate	Votes	%	±%
INC	Dr. Mukul Sangma	7,080	40.99%	▼16.88
NCP	Eril Sangma	4,941	28.61%	New
BJP	Amiya Kr. Hajong	3,710	21.48%	▲6.37
Independent	Monendro Agitok	1,110	6.43%	New
CPI	Ruparth Areng	227	1.31%	New
Independent	Monendro Marak	203	1.18%	New
Margin of victory		2,139	12.38%	▼18.48
Turnout		17,271	77.20%	▼3.05
Registered electors		22,372		▲12.51
INC hold		Swing	▼16.88	

=== Assembly Election 1998 ===
1998 Meghalaya Legislative Assembly election: Ampatigiri
Party	Candidate	Votes	%	±%
INC	Dr. Mukul Sangma	9,235	57.87%	▲51.10
Independent	Monendro Agitok	4,310	27.01%	New
BJP	Amiya Kr. Hajong	2,412	15.12%	▲4.73
Margin of victory		4,925	30.86%	▲28.88
Turnout		15,957	82.07%	▼4.53
Registered electors		19,885		▲15.51
INC gain from Independent		Swing		

=== Assembly Election 1993 ===
1993 Meghalaya Legislative Assembly election: Ampatigiri
Party	Candidate	Votes	%	±%
Independent	Dr. Mukul Sangma	4,015	27.51%	New
HPU	Momendro Agitok	3,726	25.53%	New
Independent	Jagabandhu Barman	2,070	14.18%	New
BJP	Bipra Mohan Koch	1,515	10.38%	New
Independent	Suresh Mree	1,367	9.37%	New
INC	William Cegil Marak	988	6.77%	▼25.79
Independent	Krehot N. Marak	780	5.34%	New
Margin of victory		289	1.98%	▼5.77
Turnout		14,594	86.92%	▲2.06
Registered electors		17,215		▲14.23
Independent hold		Swing	▼12.80	

=== Assembly Election 1988 ===
1988 Meghalaya Legislative Assembly election: Ampatigiri
Party	Candidate	Votes	%	±%
Independent	Monendro Agitok	5,025	40.31%	New
INC	Bhadreswar Koch	4,059	32.56%	▼0.60
Independent	Jagabandhu Barman	2,050	16.44%	New
Independent	Suresh Mree	1,141	9.15%	New
Independent	Bhupendra Sangma	191	1.53%	New
Margin of victory		966	7.75%	▲5.76
Turnout		12,466	85.38%	▲7.41
Registered electors		15,071		▲23.25
Independent gain from INC		Swing	▲7.15	

=== Assembly Election 1983 ===
1983 Meghalaya Legislative Assembly election: Ampatigiri
Party	Candidate	Votes	%	±%
INC	Bhadreswar Koch	3,053	33.16%	▼30.20
HSPDP	Monendro Agitok	2,870	31.17%	New
Independent	Jagabandhu Barman	2,324	25.24%	New
APHLC	Baikunthanath Roy Koch	961	10.44%	New
Margin of victory		183	1.99%	▼35.74
Turnout		9,208	78.29%	▲9.30
Registered electors		12,228		▲12.36
INC hold		Swing	▼30.20	

=== Assembly Election 1978 ===
1978 Meghalaya Legislative Assembly election: Ampatigiri
Party	Candidate	Votes	%	±%
INC	Bhadreswar Koch	4,551	63.36%	▲25.85
Independent	Jagabandhu Barman	1,841	25.63%	New
Independent	Benoy Bhushan Marak	791	11.01%	New
Margin of victory		2,710	37.73%	▲34.50
Turnout		7,183	69.28%	▲21.40
Registered electors		10,883		▲48.05
INC hold		Swing		

=== Assembly Election 1972 ===
1972 Meghalaya Legislative Assembly election: Ampatigiri
Party	Candidate	Votes	%	±%
INC	Jagabandhu Barman	1,230	37.51%	New
Independent	Lakhindra Hajong	1,124	34.28%	New
Independent	Binoy Bhusan Marak	925	28.21%	New
Margin of victory		106	3.23%	
Turnout		3,279	47.80%	
Registered electors		7,351		
INC win (new seat)				

== See also ==
- List of constituencies of the Meghalaya Legislative Assembly
- South West Garo Hills district
