= Nujorki Sungoh =

Indian politician

Member of Meghalaya Legislative Assembly
- In office 2018–incumbent
- Preceded by: Robinus Syngkon
- Constituency: Mowkaiaw

Personal details
- Born: Nujorki Sungoh
- Party: United Democratic Party
- Parent: Mihsalan Suchiang (father)

Nujorki Sungoh is an Indian politician. He was first elected to the Meghalaya Legislative Assembly from the 4 Mowkaiaw Assembly Constituency in the 2018 Meghalaya Legislative Assembly election and he was re-elected in the 2023 Meghalaya Legislative Assembly Election as a member of the United Democratic Party.
