= Rongjeng Assembly constituency =

Legislative Assembly constituency in Meghalaya State, India

Coordinates: 25.65°N 90.8°E

Rongjeng
- Constituency No. 42 for the Meghalaya Legislative Assembly

Constituency details
- Country: India
- Region: Northeast India
- State: Meghalaya
- District: East Garo Hills
- Lok Sabha constituency: Tura
- Established: 1972
- Total electors: 35,340
- Reservation: ST

Member of Legislative Assembly
- 11th Meghalaya Legislative Assembly
- Incumbent Jim Sangma
- Party: NPP
- Alliance: NDA
- Elected year: 2023

Rongjeng is one of the 60 Legislative Assembly constituencies of Meghalaya state in India.

It is part of the East Garo Hills district and is reserved for candidates belonging to the Scheduled Tribes.

== Members of the Legislative Assembly ==
Election	Name	Party
1972	Pleander G. Momin	Independent politician
1978	Pleander G. Momin	Indian National Congress
1983	Nihimson R. Sangma	Indian National Congress
1988	Pleander G. Momin	Hill People's Union
1993	Swajit Sangma	Independent politician
1998	Sujit Sangma	Indian National Congress
2003	Predickson G. Momin	Independent politician
2008	Desang M.Sangma	Nationalist Congress Party
2013	Sengnam Marak	Indian National Congress
2018	Jim Sangma	National People's Party
2023	Jim Sangma	National People's Party

== Election results ==
=== Assembly Election 2023 ===
2023 Meghalaya Legislative Assembly election: Rongjeng
Party	Candidate	Votes	%	±%
NPP	Jim Sangma	8,836	29.77%	▲10.74
Independent	Walseng M. Sangma	8,708	29.34%	New
AITC	Sengnam M. Marak	4,400	14.82%	New
BJP	Rapiush Ch. Sangma	3,302	11.12%	▲5.34
INC	Jebing G Momin	3,131	10.55%	▼4.33
UDP	Andreash G. Momin	1,306	4.40%	New
NOTA	None of the Above	456	1.54%	▲0.06
Margin of victory		128	0.43%	▼1.73
Turnout		29,683	83.99%	▼2.28
Registered electors		35,340		▲19.72
NPP hold		Swing	▲10.74	

=== Assembly Election 2018 ===
2018 Meghalaya Legislative Assembly election: Rongjeng
Party	Candidate	Votes	%	±%
NPP	Jim Sangma	4,846	19.03%	▼0.16
Independent	Walseng M. Sangma	4,296	16.87%	New
Independent	Rapiush Ch Sangma	4,087	16.05%	New
INC	Sengnam Marak	3,789	14.88%	▼18.09
Independent	Mettrinson G. Momin	2,408	9.46%	New
Independent	Janseng R. Marak	2,083	8.18%	New
BJP	Rikman G Momin	1,474	5.79%	New
NOTA	None of the Above	377	1.48%	New
Margin of victory		550	2.16%	▼11.53
Turnout		25,467	86.27%	▲0.82
Registered electors		29,519		▲23.95
NPP gain from INC		Swing	▼13.94	

=== Assembly Election 2013 ===
2013 Meghalaya Legislative Assembly election: Rongjeng
Party	Candidate	Votes	%	±%
INC	Sengnam Marak	6,709	32.97%	▲4.25
Independent	Sabina D Sangma	3,923	19.28%	New
NPP	Desang M Sangma	3,904	19.18%	New
Independent	Mettrinson G Momin	1,726	8.48%	New
SP	Rapiush Ch Sangma	1,604	7.88%	New
UDP	Raju G Momin	1,063	5.22%	New
NCP	Sunolsing M Sangma	580	2.85%	▼46.63
Margin of victory		2,786	13.69%	▼7.07
Turnout		20,350	85.45%	▼3.39
Registered electors		23,815		▲32.67
INC gain from NCP		Swing	▼16.51	

=== Assembly Election 2008 ===
2008 Meghalaya Legislative Assembly election: Rongjeng
Party	Candidate	Votes	%	±%
NCP	Desang M.Sangma	7,891	49.48%	▲22.25
INC	Sengnam Marak	4,580	28.72%	▲7.48
MDP	Sujit Sangma	3,476	21.80%	New
Margin of victory		3,311	20.76%	▲3.05
Turnout		15,947	88.84%	▲17.74
Registered electors		17,950		▼4.37
NCP gain from Independent		Swing		

=== Assembly Election 2003 ===
2003 Meghalaya Legislative Assembly election: Rongjeng
Party	Candidate	Votes	%	±%
Independent	Predickson G. Momin	5,998	44.95%	New
NCP	Ashutosh Marak	3,634	27.23%	New
INC	Sujit Sangma	2,834	21.24%	▼25.40
UDP	Pleander G. Momin	599	4.49%	▼20.55
BJP	Bindu Momin	280	2.10%	▼0.23
Margin of victory		2,364	17.71%	▼3.88
Turnout		13,345	71.10%	▲1.70
Registered electors		18,770		▲10.78
Independent gain from INC		Swing	▼1.69	

=== Assembly Election 1998 ===
1998 Meghalaya Legislative Assembly election: Rongjeng
Party	Candidate	Votes	%	±%
INC	Sujit Sangma	5,483	46.63%	▲13.93
UDP	Pleander G. Momin	2,944	25.04%	New
Independent	Ashutosh Marak	2,820	23.98%	New
BJP	Frenciar Momin	274	2.33%	New
GNC	Ebindra Sangma	237	2.02%	New
Margin of victory		2,539	21.59%	▲7.55
Turnout		11,758	72.10%	▼5.24
Registered electors		16,944		▲18.08
INC gain from Independent		Swing	▼0.11	

=== Assembly Election 1993 ===
1993 Meghalaya Legislative Assembly election: Rongjeng
Party	Candidate	Votes	%	±%
Independent	Swajit Sangma	5,006	46.75%	New
INC	Pleander G. Momin	3,502	32.70%	▲21.53
HPU	Franciar G. Momin	2,201	20.55%	▼4.09
Margin of victory		1,504	14.04%	▲10.47
Turnout		10,709	77.32%	▲5.08
Registered electors		14,349		▲30.56
Independent gain from HPU		Swing		

=== Assembly Election 1988 ===
1988 Meghalaya Legislative Assembly election: Rongjeng
Party	Candidate	Votes	%	±%
HPU	Pleander G. Momin	1,884	24.65%	New
Independent	Sujit Sangma	1,611	21.08%	New
Independent	Prewelson Sangma	1,245	16.29%	New
Independent	Nihimson R. Sangma	945	12.36%	New
INC	Cornel P. Marak	854	11.17%	▼19.30
Margin of victory		273	3.57%	▼2.73
Turnout		7,644	73.31%	▲6.32
Registered electors		10,990		▲23.40
HPU gain from INC		Swing	▼5.82	

=== Assembly Election 1983 ===
1983 Meghalaya Legislative Assembly election: Rongjeng
Party	Candidate	Votes	%	±%
INC	Nihimson R. Sangma	1,716	30.47%	▼13.02
Independent	Pleander G. Momin	1,361	24.17%	New
APHLC	Livingstone G. Momin	986	17.51%	▼22.95
Independent	Gothickson Momin	714	12.68%	New
Independent	Hedyson Sangma	674	11.97%	New
Independent	Akashar M. Sangma	181	3.21%	New
Margin of victory		355	6.30%	▲3.27
Turnout		5,632	66.75%	▲11.94
Registered electors		8,906		▲35.89
INC hold		Swing	▼13.02	

=== Assembly Election 1978 ===
1978 Meghalaya Legislative Assembly election: Rongjeng
Party	Candidate	Votes	%	±%
INC	Pleander G. Momin	1,462	43.49%	New
APHLC	Gothickson G. Momin	1,360	40.45%	▲14.51
Independent	Akashar Sangma	540	16.06%	New
Margin of victory		102	3.03%	▼45.09
Turnout		3,362	54.47%	▲19.55
Registered electors		6,554		▲42.02
INC gain from Independent		Swing	▼30.58	

=== Assembly Election 1972 ===
1972 Meghalaya Legislative Assembly election: Rongjeng
Party	Candidate	Votes	%	±%
Independent	Pleander G. Momin	1,085	74.06%	New
APHLC	Gornel Marak	380	25.94%	New
Margin of victory		705	48.12%	
Turnout		1,465	33.24%	
Registered electors		4,615		
Independent win (new seat)				

== See also ==
- List of constituencies of the Meghalaya Legislative Assembly
- East Garo Hills district
