= Mowkaiaw Assembly constituency =

Legislative Assembly constituency in Meghalaya State, India

Coordinates: 25.55°N 92.48°E

Mowkaiaw
- Constituency No. 4 for the Meghalaya Legislative Assembly

Constituency details
- Country: India
- Region: Northeast India
- State: Meghalaya
- District: West Jaintia Hills
- Lok Sabha constituency: Shillong
- Established: 2008
- Total electors: 38,967
- Reservation: ST

Member of Legislative Assembly
- 11th Meghalaya Legislative Assembly
- Incumbent Nujorki Sungoh
- Party: UDP
- Alliance: NDA
- Elected year: 2023

Mowkaiaw is one of the 60 Legislative Assembly constituencies of Meghalaya state in India. It is part of West Jaintia Hills district and is reserved for candidates belonging to the Scheduled Tribes. It falls under Shillong Lok Sabha constituency and its current MLA is Nujorki Sungoh of United Democratic Party.

== Members of the Legislative Assembly ==
The list of MLAs are given below –

| Year | Member | Party |
|---|---|---|
| 2013 | Robinus Syngkon | Independent |
| 2018 | Nujorki Sungoh | United Democratic Party |
| 2023 | Nujorki Sungoh | United Democratic Party |

== Election results ==
=== Assembly Election 2023 ===
2023 Meghalaya Legislative Assembly election: Mowkaiaw
| Party | Candidate | Votes | % | ±% |
|---|---|---|---|---|
| UDP | Nujorki Sungoh | 14,508 | 39.87% | ▲17.24 |
| NPP | Habahun Dkhar | 10,607 | 29.15% | ▲7.40 |
| INC | Nehemayah Tyngkan | 10,290 | 28.28% | ▲6.83 |
| AITC | Lasting Suchiang | 872 | 2.40% | New |
| NOTA | None of the Above | 360 | 0.99% | ▲0.35 |
| Margin of victory | | 3,901 | 10.72% | ▲9.84 |
| Turnout | | 36,387 | 94.30% | ▼1.91 |
| Registered electors | | 38,967 | | ▲25.57 |
| UDP hold | | Swing | ▲17.24 | |

=== Assembly Election 2018 ===
2018 Meghalaya Legislative Assembly election: Mowkaiaw
| Party | Candidate | Votes | % | ±% |
|---|---|---|---|---|
| UDP | Nujorki Sungoh | 6,691 | 22.63% | ▼3.19 |
| NPP | Gilbert Sten | 6,431 | 21.75% | ▲3.99 |
| INC | Nehemayah Tyngkan | 6,342 | 21.45% | ▼5.30 |
| BJP | Robinus Syngkon | 5,751 | 19.45% | New |
| NCP | E. C. Boniface Bamon | 2,120 | 7.17% | New |
| PDF | Heipormi Laloo | 1,714 | 5.80% | New |
| NOTA | None of the Above | 188 | 0.64% | New |
| Margin of victory | | 260 | 0.88% | ▼2.04 |
| Turnout | | 29,568 | 95.29% | ▲1.55 |
| Registered electors | | 31,031 | | ▲22.17 |
| UDP gain from Independent | | Swing | ▼7.04 | |

=== Assembly Election 2013 ===
2013 Meghalaya Legislative Assembly election: Mowkaiaw
| Party | Candidate | Votes | % | ±% |
|---|---|---|---|---|
| Independent | Robinus Syngkon | 7,064 | 29.67% | New |
| INC | Qually Suiam | 6,370 | 26.75% | New |
| UDP | Mihsalan Suchiang | 6,147 | 25.82% | New |
| NPP | E. C. Boniface Bamon | 4,229 | 17.76% | New |
| Margin of victory | | 694 | 2.91% | |
| Turnout | | 23,810 | 93.74% | |
| Registered electors | | 25,400 | | |
| Independent win (new seat) | | | | |

== See also ==
- List of constituencies of the Meghalaya Legislative Assembly
- West Jaintia Hills district
- Shillong (Lok Sabha constituency)
