= Tura Lok Sabha constituency =

Lok Sabha constituency in Meghalaya

Coordinates: 25.52°N 90.19°E

Tura ML-2
- Lok Sabha constituency
- Interactive Map Outlining Tura Lok Sabha constituency

Constituency details
- Country: India
- Region: Northeast India
- State: Meghalaya
- Assembly constituencies: 24:
- Established: 1971
- Total electors: 8,26,156
- Reservation: ST

Member of Parliament
- 18th Lok Sabha
- Incumbent Saleng A. Sangma
- Party: INC
- Alliance: INDIA
- Elected year: 2024

Tura Lok Sabha constituency is one of the two Lok Sabha (parliamentary) constituencies in Meghalaya state in northeastern India.

== Assembly segments ==
Presently, Tura Lok Sabha constituency comprises 24 Vidhan Sabha (legislative assembly) segments, which are:

Constituency Number	Name	Reserved for (ST/None)	District
37	Kharkutta	ST	North Garo Hills
38	Mendipathar	ST	North Garo Hills
39	Resubelpara	ST	North Garo Hills
40	Bajengdoba	ST	North Garo Hills
41	Songsak	ST	South West Garo Hills
42	Rongjeng	ST	East Garo Hills
43	Williamnagar	ST	East Garo Hills
44	Raksamgre	ST	West Garo Hills
45	Tikrikilla	ST	West Garo Hills
46	Phulbari	None	West Garo Hills
47	Rajabala	None	West Garo Hills
48	Selsella	ST	West Garo Hills
49	Dadenggre	ST	West Garo Hills
50	North Tura	ST	West Garo Hills
51	South Tura	ST	West Garo Hills
52	Rangsakona	ST	South West Garo Hills
53	Ampati	ST	South West Garo Hills
54	Mahendraganj	ST	West Garo Hills
55	Salmanpara	ST	South West Garo Hills
56	Gambegre	ST	West Garo Hills
57	Dalu	ST	West Garo Hills
58	Rongara Siju	ST	South Garo Hills
59	Chokpot	ST	South Garo Hills
60	Baghmara	ST	South Garo Hills

== Members of Parliament ==
Year	Member	Party
1971	K. R. Marak	All Party Hill Leaders Conference
1977	P. A. Sangma	Indian National Congress
1980	P. A. Sangma	Indian National Congress
1984	P. A. Sangma	Indian National Congress
1989	Sanford Marak	Indian National Congress
1991	P. A. Sangma	Indian National Congress
1996	P. A. Sangma	Indian National Congress
1998	P. A. Sangma	Indian National Congress
1999	P. A. Sangma	Nationalist Congress Party
2004	P. A. Sangma	Trinamool Congress
2005 (Note: Resigned in 2005 to join NCP. Was re-elected)	P. A. Sangma	Nationalist Congress Party
2008 (Note: Resigned in 2008 to join the State assembly)	Agatha Sangma	Nationalist Congress Party
2009	Agatha Sangma	Nationalist Congress Party
2014	P. A. Sangma (Note: died in 2016)	National People's Party
2016 (Note: bye-poll)	Conrad Sangma	National People's Party
2019	Agatha Sangma	National People's Party
2024	Saleng A. Sangma	Indian National Congress

== Election results ==
Vote share of Winning candidates
2024	57.45%
2019	52.18%
2016 by-poll	68.16%
2014	52.22%
2009	45.14%
2008 by-poll	0.00%
2005 by-poll	0.00%
2004	61.69%
1999	63.18%
1998	67.27%
1996	78.47%
1991	68.31%
1989	62.70%
1984	74.30%
1980	74.31%
1977	57.64%
1971	0.00%

=== 2024 ===
2024 Indian general election: Tura
Party	Candidate	Votes	%	±%
INC	Saleng A. Sangma	383,919	57.45	▲16.24
NPP	Agatha K. Sangma	228,678	34.22	▼17.96
AITC	Zenith M. Sangma	48,709	7.29	
IND	Labenn Ch. Marak	6,910	1.03	
NOTA	None of the Above	5,840	0.87	
Majority		155,241	23.23	
Turnout		674,056	81.37	
INC gain from NPP		Swing		

=== 2019 ===
2019 Indian general election: Tura
Party	Candidate	Votes	%	±%
NPP	Agatha K. Sangma	304,455	52.18	
INC	Mukul M. Sangma	240,425	41.21	
BJP	Rikman G. Momin	31,707	5.43	
NOTA	None of the Above	6,454	1.11	
Majority		64,030	10.97	
Turnout		583,480	81.38	
NPP hold		Swing		

=== 2016 by-election ===
By-Election 2016 : Tura
Party	Candidate	Votes	%	±%
NPP	Conrad Kongkal Sangma	329,497	68.16	▲15.94
INC	Dikkanchi D. Shira	1,37,285	28.40	▼15.15
NOTA	None of the Above	16,597	3.43	▼0.76
Majority		1,92,212	39.76	▲31.09
Turnout		4,83,379	77.50	▼0.60
NPP hold		Swing		

=== 2014 ===
2014 Indian general election: Tura
Party	Candidate	Votes	%	±%
NPP	P. A. Sangma	239,301	52.22	
INC	Daryl William Ch. Momin	199,585	43.55	
NOTA	None of the Above	19,185	4.19	
Majority		39,716	8.67	
Turnout		458,254	78.13	
NPP gain from NCP		Swing		

=== 2009 ===
2009 Indian general election: Tura
Party	Candidate	Votes	%	±%
NCP	Agatha K. Sangma	154,476	45.14	
INC	Debora C. Marak	136,531	39.90	
ACNC (Note: A-Chik National Congress (Democratic))	Boston Marak	40,204	11.75	
IND	Arlene N. Sangma	10,976	3.21	
Majority		17,945	5.24	
Turnout		342,187	67.66	
NCP hold		Swing		

=== 2004 ===
2004 Indian general election: Tura
Party	Candidate	Votes	%	±%
AITC	P. A. Sangma	191,938	61.69	
INC	Mukul Sangma	119,175	38.31	
Majority		72,763	23.38	
Turnout		311,113	61.77	
AITC gain from NCP		Swing		

=== 1999 ===
1999 Indian general election: Tura
Party	Candidate	Votes	%	±%
NCP	P. A. Sangma	182,883	63.18	
INC	Atul C. Marak	69,304	23.94	
BJP	Monendro Agitok	29,990	10.36	
GNC	Clifford Marak	4,561	1.58	
CPI	Robin Rema	2,736	0.95	
Majority		113,579	39.24	
Turnout		292,647	64.48	
NCP gain from INC		Swing		

=== 1998 ===
1998 Indian general election: Tura
Party	Candidate	Votes	%	±%
INC	P. A. Sangma	219,720	67.27	
BJP	Anilla D. Shira	42,061	12.88	
UDP	Hasting Ch. Momin	40,073	12.27	
GNC	William Cecil Marak	16,280	4.98	
CPI	Robin Rema	8,479	2.60	
Majority		177,659	54.39	
Turnout		335,094	75.45	
INC hold		Swing		

=== 1996 ===
1996 Indian general election: Tura
Party	Candidate	Votes	%	±%
INC	P. A. Sangma	220,424	78.47	
BJP	Enila Shira	35,634	12.69	
IND	Clifford Marak	20,710	7.37	
CPI	Robin Rema	4,138	1.47	
Majority		184,790	65.78	
Turnout		287,772	70.18	
INC hold		Swing		

=== 1991 ===
1991 Indian general election: Tura
Party	Candidate	Votes	%	±%
INC	Purno A. Sangma	136,667	68.31	
IND	Irwin K. Sangma	42,290	21.14	
BJP	Bipramohan Koch	18,430	9.21	
CPI	Robin Rema	2,672	1.34	
Majority		94,377	47.17	
Turnout		203,365	57.51	
INC hold		Swing		

=== 1989 ===
1989 Indian general election: Tura
Party	Candidate	Votes	%	±%
INC	Sanford Marak	115,553	62.70	
IND	Lamberth K. Sangma	54,675	29.67	
CPI	Robin Rema	14,078	7.64	
Majority		60,878	33.03	
Turnout		188,354	53.49	
INC hold		Swing		

=== 1984 ===
1984 Indian general election: Tura
Party	Candidate	Votes	%	±%
INC	P. A. Sangma	106,628	74.30	
IND	Willnan Sangma	27,890	19.43	
CPI	Rabin Rema	8,991	6.27	
Majority		78,738	54.87	
Turnout		147,648	52.45	
INC hold		Swing		

=== 1980 ===
1980 Indian general election: Tura
Party	Candidate	Votes	%	±%
INC(I)	P. A. Sangma	82,307	74.31	
APHLC	Grohonsing Marak	13,058	11.79	
IND	Sibendra Narayan Koch	8,440	7.62	
CPI	Robin Rema	6,955	6.28	
Majority		69,249	62.52	
Turnout		115,575	51.23	
INC(I) hold		Swing		

=== 1977 ===
1977 Indian general election: Tura
Party	Candidate	Votes	%	±%
INC	P. A. Sangma	40,288	57.64	
IND	Mody K. Marak	26,254	37.56	
IND	Emonsing M Sangma	3,358	4.80	
Majority		14,034	20.08	
Turnout		74,395	39.48	
INC gain from APHLC		Swing		

== See also ==
- Tura
- List of constituencies of the Lok Sabha
