= Nartiang Assembly constituency =

Legislative Assembly constituency in Meghalaya State, India

Coordinates: 25.58°N 92.22°E

Nartiang
- Constituency No. 1 for the Meghalaya Legislative Assembly

Constituency details
- Country: India
- Region: Northeast India
- State: Meghalaya
- District: West Jaintia Hills
- Lok Sabha constituency: Shillong
- Established: 1972
- Total electors: 44,478
- Reservation: ST

Member of Legislative Assembly
- 11th Meghalaya Legislative Assembly
- Incumbent Sniawbhalang Dhar
- Party: NPP
- Alliance: NDA
- Elected year: 2023

Nartiang is one of the 60 Legislative Assembly constituencies of Meghalaya state in India. It is part of West Jaintia Hills district and is reserved for candidates belonging to the Scheduled Tribes. It falls under Shillong Lok Sabha constituency and its current MLA is Sniawbhalang Dhar of National People's Party.

== Members of the Legislative Assembly ==
The list of MLAs are given below –

Year	Member	Party
1972	Edwingson Bareh	All Party Hill Leaders Conference
1978	H. Britainwar Dan	Independent
1983	Edwingson Bareh	Independent
1988	H. Britainwar Dan	Indian National Congress
1993	Henry Lamin	All Party Hill Leaders Conference
1998	H. Britainwar Dan	United Democratic Party
2003	Draison Kharshiing	Meghalaya Democratic Party
2008	E. C. Boniface Bamon	Nationalist Congress Party
2013	Sniawbhalang Dhar	Indian National Congress
2018	Sniawbhalang Dhar	National People's Party
2023	Sniawbhalang Dhar	National People's Party

== Election results ==
=== Assembly Election 2023 ===
2023 Meghalaya Legislative Assembly election: Nartiang
Party	Candidate	Votes	%	±%
NPP	Sniawbhalang Dhar	16,969	42.01%	▼6.59
INC	Emlang Laloo	14,846	36.75%	▼5.70
Independent	Generous Paslein	7,404	18.33%	New
UDP	Dawan Lyngdoh	893	2.21%	New
BJP	Rimiki Sari	282	0.70%	▼5.65
NOTA	None of the Above	433	1.07%	▲0.74
Margin of victory		2,123	5.26%	
Registered electors		44,478		▲21.18
NPP hold		Swing	▼6.59	

=== Assembly Election 2018 ===
2018 Meghalaya Legislative Assembly election: Nartiang
Party	Candidate	Votes	%	±%
NPP	Sniawbhalang Dhar	16,604	48.60%	New
INC	Jopthiaw Lyngdoh	14,506	42.46%	▼22.63
BJP	Draison Kharshiing	2,168	6.35%	▲5.17
KHNAM	Innocent Shadap	254	0.74%	New
Independent	Couple Stone Shylla	131	0.38%	New
NOTA	None of the Above	115	0.34%	New
Margin of victory		2,098	6.14%	▼25.21
Turnout		34,167	93.09%	▼0.28
Registered electors		36,705		▲21.27
NPP gain from INC		Swing	▼16.49	

=== Assembly Election 2013 ===
2013 Meghalaya Legislative Assembly election: Nartiang
Party	Candidate	Votes	%	±%
INC	Sniawbhalang Dhar	18,392	65.09%	▲31.93
Independent	Hilarius Dkhar	9,534	33.74%	New
BJP	Veecare Nicia Lamare	331	1.17%	New
Margin of victory		8,858	31.35%	▲29.11
Turnout		28,257	93.36%	▼0.79
Registered electors		30,266		▲41.66
INC gain from NCP		Swing		

=== Assembly Election 2008 ===
2008 Meghalaya Legislative Assembly election: Nartiang
Party	Candidate	Votes	%	±%
NCP	E. C. Boniface Bamon	7,120	35.40%	▲16.02
INC	Draison Kharshiing	6,669	33.15%	▲13.88
UDP	Henry Lamin	3,799	18.89%	▼6.37
HSPDP	H. Britainwar Dan	2,527	12.56%	▲5.53
Margin of victory		451	2.24%	▲0.42
Turnout		20,115	94.15%	▲17.78
Registered electors		21,365		▼11.17
NCP gain from MDP		Swing	▲8.31	

=== Assembly Election 2003 ===
2003 Meghalaya Legislative Assembly election: Nartiang
Party	Candidate	Votes	%	±%
MDP	Draison Kharshiing	4,975	27.09%	New
UDP	H. Britainwar Dan	4,640	25.26%	▼17.99
NCP	Hilarius Dkhar	3,559	19.38%	New
INC	Henry Lamin	3,541	19.28%	▼11.20
HSPDP	Hallelstar Lyngdoh	1,291	7.03%	▼19.24
PDM	Sati Dkhar	362	1.97%	New
Margin of victory		335	1.82%	▼10.95
Turnout		18,368	76.37%	▼3.78
Registered electors		24,051		▲7.78
MDP gain from UDP		Swing	▼16.17	

=== Assembly Election 1998 ===
1998 Meghalaya Legislative Assembly election: Nartiang
Party	Candidate	Votes	%	±%
UDP	H. Britainwar Dan	7,735	43.25%	New
INC	Henry Lamin	5,451	30.48%	▲0.44
HSPDP	Draison Kharshiing	4,698	26.27%	New
Margin of victory		2,284	12.77%	▲9.20
Turnout		17,884	82.37%	▼4.46
Registered electors		22,314		▲5.11
UDP gain from AHL(AM)		Swing		

=== Assembly Election 1993 ===
1993 Meghalaya Legislative Assembly election: Nartiang
Party	Candidate	Votes	%	±%
AHL(AM)	Henry Lamin	6,037	33.61%	New
INC	H. Britainwar Dan	5,396	30.04%	▲3.20
HPU	Dralson Kharshling	5,172	28.79%	▲3.40
BJP	Moina Singh Phyllut	1,118	6.22%	New
Independent	Sdangroy Toi	150	0.84%	New
JP	Dowellson Lyngdoh	64	0.36%	New
Janata Dal (B)	Darlingwavel Lamare	26	0.14%	New
Margin of victory		641	3.57%	▲2.12
Turnout		17,963	85.91%	▲3.32
Registered electors		21,230		▲36.90
AHL(AM) gain from INC		Swing	▲6.76	

=== Assembly Election 1988 ===
1988 Meghalaya Legislative Assembly election: Nartiang
Party	Candidate	Votes	%	±%
INC	H. Britainwar Dan	3,384	26.84%	▲23.17
HPU	Henry Lamin	3,201	25.39%	New
Independent	Edwingson Bareh	2,619	20.78%	New
HSPDP	Laitsing Shylla	2,014	15.98%	▲8.48
PDC	Moina Phyllut	1,388	11.01%	New
Margin of victory		183	1.45%	▼2.76
Turnout		12,606	83.40%	▲8.08
Registered electors		15,508		▲7.19
INC gain from Independent		Swing	▼3.79	

=== Assembly Election 1983 ===
1983 Meghalaya Legislative Assembly election: Nartiang
Party	Candidate	Votes	%	±%
Independent	Edwingson Bareh	3,244	30.63%	New
APHLC	H. Britainwar Dan	2,798	26.42%	▲8.95
Independent	Dapmain Khyriemujat	2,306	21.77%	New
Independent	Moina Singh Phyllut	1,060	10.01%	New
HSPDP	Watchington Sna	794	7.50%	▼2.71
INC	Romeo Chmpa Biam	389	3.67%	▼23.08
Margin of victory		446	4.21%	▼14.61
Turnout		10,591	76.82%	▼3.44
Registered electors		14,468		▲22.89
Independent hold		Swing	▼14.94	

=== Assembly Election 1978 ===
1978 Meghalaya Legislative Assembly election: Nartiang
Party	Candidate	Votes	%	±%
Independent	H. Britainwar Dan	4,112	45.57%	New
INC	Edwingson Bareh	2,414	26.75%	New
APHLC	Moina Singh Phyllut	1,576	17.47%	▼33.29
HSPDP	Michael Kahit	921	10.21%	New
Margin of victory		1,698	18.82%	▲6.38
Turnout		9,023	78.64%	▲2.78
Registered electors		11,773		▲13.46
Independent gain from APHLC		Swing	▼5.18	

=== Assembly Election 1972 ===
1972 Meghalaya Legislative Assembly election: Nartiang
Party	Candidate	Votes	%	±%
APHLC	Edwingson Bareh	3,890	50.76%	New
Independent	Olbin Lamare	2,937	38.32%	New
Independent	Britainwar Dan	837	10.92%	New
Margin of victory		953	12.43%	
Turnout		7,664	75.54%	
Registered electors		10,376		
APHLC win (new seat)				

== See also ==
- List of constituencies of the Meghalaya Legislative Assembly
- Shillong (Lok Sabha constituency)
- West Jaintia Hills district
