= Marthon Sangma =

Indian politician

Marthon Sangma is an Indian politician and member of the All India Trinamool Congress Party. Sangma was first elected as a member of the Meghalaya Legislative Assembly in 2013 from the Mendipathar constituency in North Garo Hills district.
