= Santa Mary Shylla =

Indian politician

Member of the Meghalaya Legislative Assembly

Santa Mary Shylla (born 1984) is an Indian politician from Meghalaya. She is a member of the Meghalaya Legislative Assembly from the Sutnga Saipung Assembly constituency, which is reserved for Scheduled Tribe community, in East Jaintia Hills district. She won the 2023 Meghalaya Legislative Assembly election, representing the National People's Party.

== Early life and education ==
Shylla is from Sutnga Saipung, East Jaintia Hills district, Meghalaya, daughter of (L) Thomas Nongtdu. She completed her Bachelor of Science in optometry in 2012 at Martin Luther University, Shillong, East Khasi Hills District, Meghalaya.

== Career ==
Shylla won the Sutnga Saipung Assembly constituency representing National People's Party in the 2023 Meghalaya Legislative Assembly election. She polled 16,974 votes and defeated her nearest rival and state Indian National Congress Party chief, Vincent Pala, by a margin of 22,108 votes.
