= South Shillong Assembly constituency =

Legislative Assembly constituency in Meghalaya State, India

Coordinates: 25.56°N 91.87°E

South Shillong
- Constituency No. 19 for the Meghalaya Legislative Assembly

Constituency details
- Country: India
- Region: Northeast India
- State: Meghalaya
- District: East Khasi Hills
- Lok Sabha constituency: Shillong
- Established: 2008
- Total electors: 34,186
- Reservation: None

Member of Legislative Assembly
- 11th Meghalaya Legislative Assembly
- Incumbent Sanbor Shullai
- Party: Bharatiya Janata Party
- Elected year: 2023

South Shillong is one of the 60 Legislative Assembly constituencies of Meghalaya state in India. It is part of East Khasi Hills district. It falls under Shillong Lok Sabha constituency and comprises Wards 22 to 27 of the Shillong Municipal Corporation as well as Shillong Cantonment. Its current MLA is Sanbor Shullai of the Bharatiya Janata Party.

== Members of the Legislative Assembly ==
Election	Member	Party
2013	Sanbor Shullai	Nationalist Congress Party
2018	Sanbor Shullai	Bharatiya Janata Party
2023	Sanbor Shullai	Bharatiya Janata Party

== Election results ==
=== Assembly Election 2023 ===
2023 Meghalaya Legislative Assembly election: South Shillong
Party	Candidate	Votes	%	±%
BJP	Sanbor Shullai	14,213	67.12%	▲18.23
VPP	Danny Langstieh	2,604	12.30%	New
Independent	Angela Rangad	1,714	8.09%	New
AITC	Ian Andrew Lyngdoh Nongkynrih	1,560	7.37%	New
INC	Venetia Pearl Mawlong	1,086	5.13%	▼21.52
NOTA	None of the Above	444	2.10%	▲0.38
Margin of victory		11,609	54.82%	▲32.58
Turnout		21,177	61.95%	▼10.08
Registered electors		34,186		▲7.43
BJP hold		Swing	▲18.23	

=== Assembly Election 2018 ===
2018 Meghalaya Legislative Assembly election: South Shillong
Party	Candidate	Votes	%	±%
BJP	Sanbor Shullai	11,204	48.88%	▲35.52
INC	Manas Chaudhuri	6,107	26.64%	▼2.26
NPP	Sounder Strong Cajee	3,604	15.72%	▲14.38
NCP	Vikash Gupta	1,085	4.73%	▼29.65
Independent	Moon Lyngdoh	147	0.64%	New
NOTA	None of the Above	393	1.71%	New
Margin of victory		5,097	22.24%	▲16.75
Turnout		22,921	72.03%	▼3.32
Registered electors		31,822		▲14.85
BJP gain from NCP		Swing	▲14.50	

=== Assembly Election 2013 ===
2013 Meghalaya Legislative Assembly election: South Shillong
Party	Candidate	Votes	%	±%
NCP	Sanbor Shullai	7,179	34.38%	New
INC	Manas Chaudhuri	6,034	28.90%	New
Independent	Sounder Strong Cajee	3,151	15.09%	New
BJP	Augustine Lakiang	2,789	13.36%	New
UDP	Edward L. Kharwanlang	1,316	6.30%	New
NPP	Mehboob K. Lyngdoh	281	1.35%	New
SP	Binod Kumar Joshi	129	0.62%	New
Margin of victory		1,145	5.48%	
Turnout		20,879	75.35%	
Registered electors		27,708		
NCP win (new seat)				

== See also ==
- Shillong (Lok Sabha constituency)
- East Khasi Hills district
