= Baghmara, Meghalaya Assembly constituency =

Legislative Assembly constituency in Meghalaya State, India

Coordinates: 25.2°N 90.63°E

Baghmara
- Constituency No. 60 for the Meghalaya Legislative Assembly

Constituency details
- Country: India
- Region: Northeast India
- State: Meghalaya
- District: South Garo Hills
- Lok Sabha constituency: Tura
- Established: 2003
- Total electors: 33,246
- Reservation: ST

Member of Legislative Assembly
- 11th Meghalaya Legislative Assembly
- Incumbent Kartush Marak
- Party: Independent
- Elected year: 2023

Baghmara is one of the 60 Legislative Assembly constituencies of Meghalaya state in India.

It is part of South Garo Hills district and is reserved for candidates belonging to the Scheduled Tribes.

== Members of the Legislative Assembly ==
Election	Name	Party
Assam
1962	Williamson A. Sangma	All Party Hill Leaders Conference
1967	Williamson A. Sangma	All Party Hill Leaders Conference
Meghalaya
1978	Williamson A. Sangma	Indian National Congress
1983	Williamson A. Sangma	Indian National Congress
1988	Williamson A. Sangma	Indian National Congress
1993	Lotsing A. Sangma	Indian National Congress
1998	Lotsing A. Sangma	Indian National Congress
2003	Sengran M. Sangma	Indian National Congress
2008	Satto R. Marak	Nationalist Congress Party
2013	Samuel M. Sangma	Independent politician
2018	Samuel M. Sangma	Independent politician
2023	Kartush Marak	Independent politician

== Election results ==
=== Assembly Election 2023 ===
2023 Meghalaya Legislative Assembly election: Baghmara
Party	Candidate	Votes	%	±%
Independent	Kartush Marak	9,013	31.11%	New
BJP	Samuel M. Sangma	6,788	23.43%	New
NPP	Satto R. Marak	5,493	18.96%	▼3.87
Independent	Nathawal S. Marak	4,658	16.08%	New
AITC	Dr. Saljagringrang R. Marak	2,759	9.52%	▲8.15
INC	Alphonse Ch. Sangma	257	0.89%	▼16.49
NOTA	None of the Above	205	0.71%	▼0.81
Margin of victory		2,225	7.68%	▼1.10
Turnout		28,968	87.13%	▼0.98
Registered electors		33,246		▲14.78
Independent hold		Swing	▼0.50	

=== Assembly Election 2018 ===
2018 Meghalaya Legislative Assembly election: Baghmara
Party	Candidate	Votes	%	±%
Independent	Samuel M. Sangma	8,070	31.62%	New
NPP	Sengnal N. Sangma	5,828	22.83%	▲18.85
GNC	Nikman Ch. Marak	5,322	20.85%	New
INC	Sirgan A. Sangma	4,435	17.38%	▲2.45
Independent	Dr. Saljagringrang R. Marak	853	3.34%	New
AITC	Mondil G. Momin	351	1.38%	New
NOTA	None of the Above	388	1.52%	New
Margin of victory		2,242	8.78%	▼8.91
Turnout		25,523	88.11%	▲0.19
Registered electors		28,966		▲25.64
Independent hold		Swing	▼6.51	

=== Assembly Election 2013 ===
2013 Meghalaya Legislative Assembly election: Baghmara
Party	Candidate	Votes	%	±%
Independent	Samuel M. Sangma	7,728	38.13%	New
Independent	Sirgan A. Sangma	4,141	20.43%	New
INC	Lazarus M. Sangma	3,025	14.92%	▼19.11
Independent	Olendro R. Marak	1,346	6.64%	New
Independent	Secondson A. Sangma	1,339	6.61%	New
NPP	Milan M. Sangma	808	3.99%	New
NCP	Panseng R. Marak	716	3.53%	▼42.35
Margin of victory		3,587	17.70%	▲5.85
Turnout		20,270	87.92%	▼0.57
Registered electors		23,054		▲26.17
Independent gain from NCP		Swing	▼7.76	

=== Assembly Election 2008 ===
2008 Meghalaya Legislative Assembly election: Baghmara
Party	Candidate	Votes	%	±%
NCP	Satto R. Marak	7,419	45.88%	▲5.02
INC	Arjun W. Momin	5,504	34.04%	▼17.95
Independent	Lazarus M. Sangma	890	5.50%	New
Independent	Gentilla R. Marak	796	4.92%	New
Independent	Hembilstone K. Sangma	609	3.77%	New
UDP	Florence Sangma	535	3.31%	New
Independent	Julius Sangma	417	2.58%	New
Margin of victory		1,915	11.84%	▲0.72
Turnout		16,170	88.50%	▲12.81
Registered electors		18,272		▼6.68
NCP gain from INC		Swing	▼6.10	

=== Assembly Election 2003 ===
2003 Meghalaya Legislative Assembly election: Baghmara
Party	Candidate	Votes	%	±%
INC	Sengran M. Sangma	7,703	51.98%	▲2.48
NCP	Lotsing A. Sangma	6,055	40.86%	New
Independent	Robert T. Sangma	1,060	7.15%	New
Margin of victory		1,648	11.12%	▲5.95
Turnout		14,818	75.69%	▼1.94
Registered electors		19,579		▲17.29
INC hold		Swing		

=== Assembly Election 1998 ===
1998 Meghalaya Legislative Assembly election: Baghmara
Party	Candidate	Votes	%	±%
INC	Lotsing A. Sangma	6,414	49.50%	▼3.37
UDP	Sengran M. Sangma	5,744	44.33%	New
Independent	Alphonse Sangma	627	4.84%	New
Independent	Aldrin Sangma	120	0.93%	New
Independent	Elphinstone Marak	52	0.40%	New
Margin of victory		670	5.17%	▼0.58
Turnout		12,957	79.22%	▼1.82
Registered electors		16,693		▲9.79
INC hold		Swing	▼3.37	

=== Assembly Election 1993 ===
1993 Meghalaya Legislative Assembly election: Baghmara
Party	Candidate	Votes	%	±%
INC	Lotsing A. Sangma	6,386	52.87%	▼13.11
HPU	Sengran M. Sangma	5,692	47.13%	New
Margin of victory		694	5.75%	▼26.23
Turnout		12,078	81.16%	▲7.84
Registered electors		15,204		▲30.71
INC hold		Swing		

=== Assembly Election 1988 ===
1988 Meghalaya Legislative Assembly election: Baghmara
Party	Candidate	Votes	%	±%
INC	Williamson A. Sangma	5,496	65.99%	▼8.92
Independent	Weable Ch. Sangma	2,833	34.01%	New
Margin of victory		2,663	31.97%	▼25.06
Turnout		8,329	74.43%	▲4.59
Registered electors		11,632		▲17.48
INC hold		Swing		

=== Assembly Election 1983 ===
1983 Meghalaya Legislative Assembly election: Baghmara
Party	Candidate	Votes	%	±%
INC	Williamson A. Sangma	4,970	74.91%	▲3.35
APHLC	Emerson Marak	1,186	17.87%	▼0.45
CPI	Bharat Sangma	297	4.48%	New
Independent	Roelson Marak	182	2.74%	New
Margin of victory		3,784	57.03%	▲3.80
Turnout		6,635	69.63%	▲11.25
Registered electors		9,901		▲10.58
INC hold		Swing	▲3.35	

=== Assembly Election 1978 ===
1978 Meghalaya Legislative Assembly election: Baghmara
Party	Candidate	Votes	%	±%
INC	Williamson A. Sangma	3,573	71.56%	New
APHLC	Elphinstone R. Marak	915	18.33%	New
Independent	Shubendro M. Marak	505	10.11%	New
Margin of victory		2,658	53.23%	
Turnout		4,993	59.62%	
Registered electors		8,954		
INC win (new seat)				

== See also ==
- List of constituencies of the Meghalaya Legislative Assembly
- South Garo Hills district
