= Sanbor Shullai =

Indian politician

Minister of Animal Husbandry and Veterinary Minister of Printing and Stationery & Minister of Arts and Culture & Minister of Legal Metrology of Meghalaya
- Incumbent
- Assumed office 16 September 2025
- Chief Minister: Conrad Sangma
- Preceded by: Alexander Laloo Hek

Member of Meghalaya Legislative Assembly
- Incumbent
- Assumed office 2013
- Constituency: South Shillong

Minister of Health and Family Welfare of Meghalaya
- In office 30 July 2021 – 5 March 2023
- Chief Minister: Conrad Sangma
- Preceded by: Alexander Laloo Hek
- Succeeded by: Ampareen Lyngdoh

Personal details
- Party: Bharatiya Janata Party

Sanbor Shullai is an Indian politician. He was elected to the Meghalaya Legislative Assembly from South Shillong as a member of the Bharatiya Janata Party. Previously, he used to be the Deputy Speaker of the Meghalaya Legislative Assembly.
