= North Garo Hills district =

Coordinates: 25.8943°N 90.5998°E

- District of Meghalaya
- North Garo Hills district Location in Meghalaya
- Country: India
- State: Meghalaya
- Headquarters: Resubelpara

Government
  - Vidhan Sabha constituencies: 4

Area
  - Total: 1,113 km^{2} (430 sq mi)

Population (2001)
  - Total: 118,325
  - Density: 106.3/km^{2} (275.3/sq mi)
- Time zone: UTC+05:30 (IST)
- Website: northgarohills.gov.in

North Garo Hills district is an administrative district in the state of Meghalaya in India. The district headquarters are located at Resubelpara. The district occupies an area of 1,113 km^{2} and has a population of 1,18,325 (as of 2001).

== History ==
The North Garo Hills district was carved out of the erstwhile East Garo Hills district. And whereas for public convenience and better administration the Governor of Meghalaya considers it necessary to upgrade the said Resubelpara Civil Sub-Division of East Garo Hills District into a full·fledged District.

== Geography ==
Resubelpara is the district headquarters of North Garo Hills District.
