= 2026 Garo Hills Autonomous District Council election =

2026 Local government election in Meghalaya, India

- TBD

29 out of 30 seats in the Garo Hills Autonomous District Council 16 seats needed for a majority

Leader	Vincent Pala	Conrad Sangma	Sanbor Shullai
Party	INC	NPP	BJP
Last election	12	11	2
Current seats	0	11	2
Seats needed	▲16	▲5	▲14
	GNC
Leader	Boston Marak	Mukul Sangma
Party	GNC	AITC	NCP
Last election	1	0	0
Current seats	1	12	0
Seats needed	▲15	▲4	▲16
Incumbent Chief Executive Member
Albinush R Marak
NPP

The Garo Hills ADC elections were scheduled to be held on 21 April 2026 to elect all 29 members of the Garo Hills Autonomous District Council. However, the elections were postponed indefinitely due to violence in West Garo Hills.

== Background ==
The tenure of Garo Hills Autonomous District Council is scheduled to end on 18 April 2026. The previous elections were held on 12 April 2021. After the election National People's Party formed the government and Benedict Marak sworn in as the chief executive member.

== Schedule ==
Election Event	Date	Time	Day
Last date for filing nomination	16 March 2026	Before 3:00 pm	Monday
Scrutiny of nomination	16 March 2026	After 3:00 pm	Monday
Last date of withdrawal of candidature	17 March 2026		Tuesday
Date of polling	10 April 2026		Friday
Date of counting	14 April 2026		Tuesday

== Parties & alliances ==
Party	Flag	Symbol	Leader	Seats contested
National People's Party			Conrad Sangma	29
Indian National Congress			Vincent Pala	27
All India Trinamool Congress			Mukul Sangma	TBD
Bharatiya Janata Party			Sanbor Shullai	23
Garo National Council			Boston Marak	TBD

== Candidates ==
Constituency		NPP	INC	BJP	TMC	GNC	NCP
1	Siju	Calis Momin	Kartick Marak	Mark Pantora M Sangma			Senggam Sangma
2	Wagesik	Jewil Marak	Budhar Marak		Tening Sangma		
3	Silkigre	Jangseng Marak	Arjun Marak		Changseng Marak	Augustine Marak	
4	Rongrikimgre	Walbinath Ch Marak	Karak sangma		Witerson Sangma	Nikman Marak	Arnarson Marak
5	Gasuapara	Sengchim Sangma	Sengrik Marak	Alphonse Sangma			
6	Barengapara	Kailson Sangma	Gredit Sangma	Akki A Sangma	Sarbha Marak		
7	Babelapara	Rakesh Sangma		George Sangma	Richard Morong Sangma		
8	Amongpara	Balsrang Arengh	Luckshwell Sangma	Wilnath T Sangma	Sairil Marak	Jakrak Sangma	Lordmountvrythints Momin
9	Tura	Charmingstar Sangma	Prewill Ch. Marak	Bernard Marak	Dimseng Marak		
10	Dengnakpara	Kredithoson Marak	Sadhiarani Sangma	Repsin Sangma	Hilthudhera Marak	Deson Marak	Baithiram Sangma
11	Boldamgre	Stevie M Marak	Binvinchand Sangma	Drojil Sangma	Batchor Marak		
12	Nogorpara	Linekar Sangma	Chand Emirald Marak	Salibirth Sangma	Gamrik Sangma		Gracefield Ch Marak
13	Zikzak	Sanjay Sangma	Premish Sangma	Bhupandra Hajong	Premananda Koch		
14	Betasing	Sanjay Koch	Ajitav Koch	Hiralal Koch	Hemendra Hajong		Bina Rosaline Sangma
15	Rochonpara	Arbinstone Marak	Ripseng Marak	Jeberth Sangma			Daniel Sangma
16	Asanang	Anseng Sangma	Nonickha Momin		Rahendra Sangma	Geobar Marak	Kraistone Marak
17	Balachanda	Andresh Marak	Tingku Marak	Rikse Marak			Dominic Sangma
18	Batabari	Maxwell Sangma	Ruth Tamera Sangma	Clement Marak			Kingtone Bolwari Marak
19	Shyamnagar	Peterjob Sangma	Lilian Marak	John Keats sangma	Ranicheanik Chenika Marak		
20	Raksamgre	Sengko D. Sangma	Sengrak Sangma	Karmingstone Marak	Lithson Marak		
21	Naguapara	Dormonat Ch Sangma		Rahinath Barchung			
22	Jengjal	Grahambell Sangma	Levastone Sangma	Miritha Sangma	Badith Sangma		
23	Rongrong	Sunny Rogers Momin	Dr. Tweel Marak	Barning Marak		Sengba Sangma	
24	Bolsong	Pongseng Marak	Brigady Marak	Sengpan Marak	Asish Marak		
25	Damas	Dolly Sangma	Timjim Momin	Bikash Momin	Pedinand Shira		
26	Kharkutta	Mody Sangma	George Sangma	Sengsrang Marak			
27	Samandagre	Nihim Shira	Brilliant Sangma	Chales T Sangma	Baseng Marak		
28	Darugre	Henen Sangma	Walseng Sangma				
29	Williamnagar	Sengbath Marak	Denang Sangma		Alphonush Marak	Chibasai Lampard Marak	
