= Fourth Lapang ministry =

Cabinet of Meghalaya (2008)

- 19th Ministry of Meghalaya

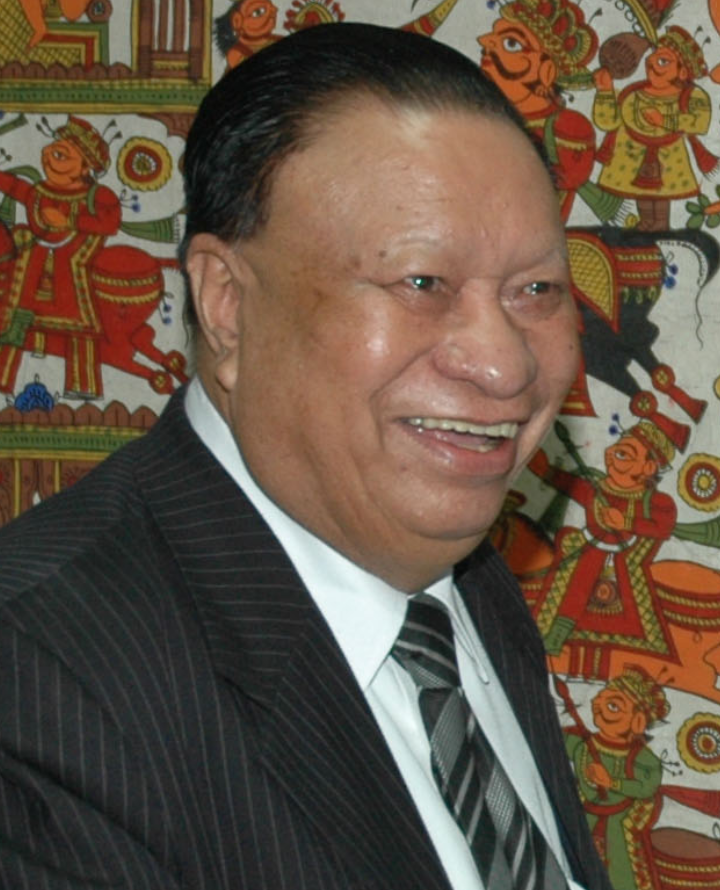
- D. D. Lapang
- Date formed: 10 March 2008
- Date dissolved: 18 March 2008

People and organisations
- Governor: Shivinder Singh Sidhu
- Chief Minister: D. D. Lapang
- Deputy Chief Minister: Mukul Sangma
- No. of ministers: 8
- Member parties: Indian National Congress
- Status in legislature: Minority

History
- Election: 2008
- Outgoing election: 2013
- Legislature term: 5 years
- Predecessor: Third Lapang ministry
- Successor: Donkupar Roy ministry

The Fourth Lapang ministry was the short-lived minority government and the 19th council of ministers of the Indian state of Meghalaya headed by Chief Minister D. D. Lapang who was re-appointed as chief minister for a consecutive second term on 11 March 2008 despite his party, the Indian National Congress failing to secure a majority in the state election held earlier in the month. However, within days of his re-appointment, on 18 March 2008, ahead of a vote of no-confidence in the Meghalaya Legislative Assembly, chief minister Lapang tendered his resignation.

== History ==
The state assembly election held in March 2008 resulted in no single political party securing a majority. The ruling Indian National Congress emerged as the single-largest party with 25 seats followed by the Nationalist Congress Party with 14 seats and the United Democratic Party with 11 seats. Governor Shivinder Singh Sidhu re-appointed D. D. Lapang as the chief minister despite the Congress not having a majority in the legislature.

However, on 18 March 2008, ahead of a vote of no-confidence in the legislature, Lapang chose to resign. He was replaced by Donkupar Roy of the United Democratic Party who formed the Meghalaya Progressive Alliance coalition along with the other non-Congress parties and formed the government.

== Cabinet formation ==
The cabinet consisted of the chief minister, deputy chief minister Mukul Sangma, four cabinet ministers, and two ministers of state. Among the eight ministers, five belonged to the Indian National Congress and three were independent legislators. The cabinet ministers were Martin Danggo, Prestone Tynsong, Roytre Christopher Laloo, and Abu Taher Mondal. The ministers of state were Ismail R. Marak and Limison D. Sangma who were also assigned with independent portfolios.

== List of ministers ==
=== Cabinet Ministers ===
| Portfolio | Minister | Took office | Left office | Party |
|---|---|---|---|---|
| Chief Minister and also incharge of: Department of Personnel; Department of Political; Department of Cabinet Affairs; Department of Planning; Department of Tourism; Department of Law; All other departments not assigned to any other Minister. | D. D. Lapang | 10 March 2008 | 18 March 2008 | INC |
| Deputy Chief Minister and; Minister of Finance; Minister of Power; Minister of Agriculture and Horticulture | Mukul Sangma | 12 March 2008 | 18 March 2008 | INC |
| Minister of Food and Civil Supplies; Minister of Forest and Environment; Minister of Animal Husbandry and Veterinary | Martin Danggo | 12 March 2008 | 18 March 2008 | INC |
| Minister of Public Works (Roads); Minister of General Administration; Minister of Border Areas Development | Prestone Tynsong | 12 March 2008 | 18 March 2008 | INC |
| Minister of Higher and Technical Education; Minister of Elementary and Mass Education; Minister of Information and Public Relations; Minister of Parliamentary Affairs | Roytre Christopher Laloo | 12 March 2008 | 18 March 2008 | INC |
| Minister of Health and Family Welfare; Minister of Secretariat Administration; Minister of Home (Civil Defence and Home Guards) | Abu Taher Mondal | 12 March 2008 | 18 March 2008 | IND |

=== Ministers of State ===
| Portfolio | Minister | Took office | Left office | Party |
|---|---|---|---|---|
| Minister of State (Independent Charge) for Transport; Minister of State (Independent Charge) for Home (Passport); Minister of State for Education | Ismail R. Marak | 12 March 2008 | 18 March 2008 | IND |
| Minister of State (Independent Charge) for Excise; Minister of State (Independent Charge) for Sports and Youth Welfare; Minister of State for Public Works (Roads) | Limison D. Sangma | 12 March 2008 | 18 March 2008 | IND |
