= 2015 Garo Hills Autonomous District Council election =

Local government contest in Meghalaya, India

← 2009	12 October 2015	2021 →

29 out of 30 seats in the Garo Hills Autonomous District Council 15 seats needed for a majority
- Turnout: 65%

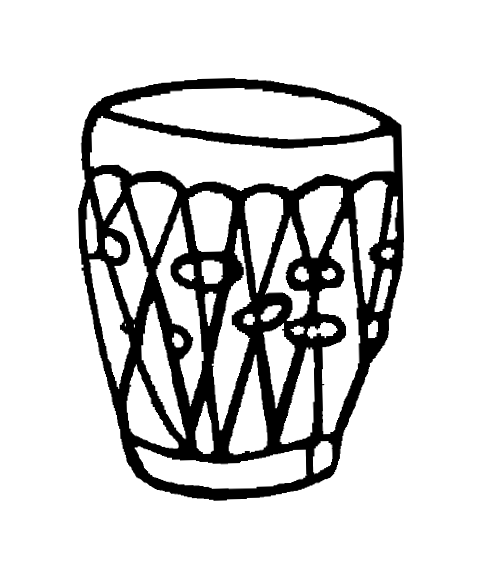
	First party	Second party	Third party
Party	NPP	INC	BJP
Seats won	10	7	1
	Fourth party	Fifth party	Sixth party
Party	GNC	NCP	UDP
Seats won	3	1	0
Chief Executive Member
Dipul Marak
NPP

Elections to the Garo Hills Autonomous District Council (GHADC) were held on 12 October 2021. The NPP emerged as the largest party with 10 seats after the counting of the election results.

== Party Candidates ==
Constituency		NPP	INC	BJP	GNC	UDP	NCP
1	Siju	Albinush R Marak	Alphonse A Sangma		Pedindro M Sangma		
2	Wagesik	Sengnal N Sangma	Freedarson N Sangma			Plebirth M Sangma	
3	Silkigre	Nilath R Marak	Jeswell Ch Marak		Augustine R Marak		
4	Rongrikimgre	Pangrak Ch Marak	Willy D Shira		Wennison Ch Marak		
5	Gasuapara	Sengchim N Sangma	Olendro R Marak			Panseng Marak	
6	Barengapara	Nasser R. Marak	Silgra Marak				
7	Babelapara	Mckensson Ch Marak	Christilla Marak	Mose Sangma			Rightious Sangma
8	Amongpara	Stiner R. Marak	Minggen Ch Marak		Jinbirth Marak	Butther N Marak	Bilsan N Momin
9	Tura	H Jimmy M Momin	Dulal Ch Sangma			Tinash Ch Momin	
10	Dengnakpara	Learmildfor A Sangma	Sadhiya Rani M Sangma			Cryster Ch Marak	
11	Boldamgre	Larson N Sangma	Stevie M Marak				
12	Nogorpara	Boston Marak	Moppish R Marak				
13	Zikzak		Jogdish Ch Hajong	Bhupender Hajong			
14	Betasing		Nripendra Koch	Mahiran Hajong			
15	Rochonpara	Dipul R. Marak	Malcolm M Sangma		Minthu Sangma		
16	Asanang	Mibharsan P Sangma	Ismail R Sangma			Kredithson Ch Marak	
17	Balachanda	Carry Marak	Monirul Islam	Biplab A Marak			
18	Batabari	Roynath D. Sangma	Septerwin R Sangma				
19	Shyamnagar	E S Estamur Momin	Sader Hossain	Iqbal Ch Marak		Sorojith Ch Momin	
20	Raksamgre	Benedic R Marak	Joyson R. Marak			Rongban R Marak	
21	Naguapara		Dhormonath Ch Sangma	Ranjit Rabha			
22	Jengjal	Grahambell A Sangma	Purno K Sangma				
23	Rongrong	Sukharam K Sangma	Thomson			Balnash Marak	
24	Bolsong	Rakman Ch Marak	Jogonsing Sangma			Tengsil Momin	
25	Damas	Dolly K Sangma	Jingje Shira				
26	Kharkutta	Edbirth D. Shira	Smith Momin			Anand M Marak	
27	Samandagre	Brilliant R Sangma	Lahitson M Sangma			Silman M Marak	
28	Darugre	Mettrinson G Momin	Builthon Ch Sangma			Henen R Sangma	Marconi S Mankhin
29	Williamnagar	Denang T Sangma	Sengbath Marak			Mahamsing M Sangma	
	Total	26	29	6	5	14	3

== Results ==
=== By Party ===
Party	Popular vote			Seats		
Party	Vote	%	+/-	Contested	Won	+/-
National People's Party(NPP)				26	10	
Indian National Congress(INC)				29	7	
Bharatiya Janata Party(BJP)				6	1	
United Democratic Party(UDP)				14	0	
Garo National Council(GNC)				5	3	
Nationalist Congress Party(NCP)				3	1	
Independent(IND)					7	
None of the above (NOTA)				N/A		
Total						

=== By Constituency ===
No.	Constituency	Winner	Party	Margin
1	Siju	Kenadik S Marak	Independent	3475
2	Wagesik	Sengnal N Sangma	NPP	2291
3	Silkigre	Augustine R Marak	GNC	3296
4	Rongrikimgre	Wenison Ch Marak	GNC	2772
5	Gasuapara	Devier M Sangma	Independent	3745
6	Barengapara	Kurosh R Marak	Independent	3774
7	Babelapara	Righteous N Sangma	NCP	3308
8	Amongpara	Jimbirth Marak	GNC	2923
9	Tura	Rupert M Sangma	Independent	3126
10	Dengnakpara	Sadhiarani M Sangma	INC	6366
11	Boldamgre	Stevie M Marak	INC	6536
12	Nogorpara	Boston Marak	NPP	5523
13	Zikzak	Bhupendra B Hajong	BJP	9427
14	Betasing	Nipendra Koch	INC	6078
15	Rochonpara	Dipul R Marak	NPP	4858
16	Asanang	Ismael R Marak	INC	2995
17	Balachanda	Sofiur Rahman	Independent	8971
18	Batabari	Mark Geora B Marak	Independent	4724
19	Shyamnagar	S G Esmatur Momin	NPP	9483
20	Raksamgre	Benedict R Marak	NPP	7448
21	Naguapara	Dhormonath Sangma	INC	5054
22	Jengjal	Libastone T Sangma	Independent	4135
23	Rongrong	Sukharam K Sangma	NPP	7507
24	Bolsong	Jogonsing D Sangma	INC	3459
25	Damas	Doly K Sangma	NPP	9061
26	Kharkutta	Smith M Momin	INC	5531
27	Samandagre	Brilliant R Sangma	NPP	5680
28	Darugre	Mettrinson G Momin	NPP	5685
29	Williamnagar	Denang T Sangma	NPP	3503
