= Rangsakona Assembly constituency =

Legislative Assembly constituency in Meghalaya State, India

Coordinates: 25.54°N 90.04°E

Rangsakona
- Constituency No. 52 for the Meghalaya Legislative Assembly

Constituency details
- Country: India
- Region: Northeast India
- State: Meghalaya
- District: South West Garo Hills
- Lok Sabha constituency: Tura
- Established: 1972
- Total electors: 37,543
- Reservation: ST

Member of Legislative Assembly
- 11th Meghalaya Legislative Assembly
- Incumbent Subir Marak
- Party: NPP
- Alliance: NDA
- Elected year: 2023

Rangsakona is one of the 60 Legislative Assembly constituencies of Meghalaya state in India.

It is part of South West Garo Hills district and is reserved for candidates belonging to the Scheduled Tribes.

== Members of the Legislative Assembly ==
Election	Name	Party
1972	Sanford Marak	All Party Hill Leaders Conference
1978	Jenden Ch. Marak	All Party Hill Leaders Conference
1983	Pipinson Momin	Indian National Congress
1988	Chesterfield Marak	Hill People's Union
1993	Adolf Lu Hitler Marak	Indian National Congress
1998	Adolf Lu Hitler Marak	Indian National Congress
2003	Zenith Sangma	Indian National Congress
2008	Adolf Lu Hitler Marak	Nationalist Congress Party
2013	Zenith Sangma	Indian National Congress
2018	Zenith Sangma	Indian National Congress
2023	Subir Marak	National People's Party

== Election results ==
=== Assembly Election 2023 ===
2023 Meghalaya Legislative Assembly election: Rangsakona
Party	Candidate	Votes	%	±%
NPP	Subir Marak	13,605	41.96%	▼0.93
AITC	Zenith Sangma	12,817	39.53%	▲38.21
BJP	Dipul R. Marak	4,571	14.10%	New
INC	Edmund S Sangma	820	2.53%	▼47.37
RPI(A)	Indrash M. Marak	353	1.09%	New
UDP	Bipul Ch. Sangma	255	0.79%	New
NOTA	None of the Above	195	0.60%	▼0.00
Margin of victory		788	2.43%	▼4.57
Turnout		32,421	86.36%	▼1.92
Registered electors		37,543		▲18.28
NPP gain from INC		Swing	▼7.93	

=== Assembly Election 2018 ===
2018 Meghalaya Legislative Assembly election: Rangsakona
Party	Candidate	Votes	%	±%
INC	Zenith Sangma	13,981	49.90%	▲1.67
NPP	Subir Marak	12,019	42.90%	▲22.87
Independent	Dr. Pilne A. Sangma	567	2.02%	New
Independent	Eldred Ch. Marak	451	1.61%	New
AITC	Kredithson Marak	372	1.33%	New
Independent	Mody M. Sangma	249	0.89%	New
NOTA	None of the Above	169	0.60%	New
Margin of victory		1,962	7.00%	▼18.66
Turnout		28,019	88.28%	▼0.13
Registered electors		31,740		▲18.64
INC hold		Swing	▲1.67	

=== Assembly Election 2013 ===
2013 Meghalaya Legislative Assembly election: Rangsakona
Party	Candidate	Votes	%	±%
INC	Zenith Sangma	11,407	48.23%	▲6.34
Independent	Subir Marak	5,337	22.56%	New
NPP	Dipul R. Marak	4,736	20.02%	New
Independent	Jingjang M. Marak	886	3.75%	New
SP	Manjit Koch	479	2.03%	New
BJP	Anil Kr. Hajong	343	1.45%	New
Independent	Mody M. Sangma	230	0.97%	New
Margin of victory		6,070	25.66%	▲13.54
Turnout		23,653	88.41%	▼6.27
Registered electors		26,754		▲66.98
INC gain from NCP		Swing	▼5.78	

=== Assembly Election 2008 ===
2008 Meghalaya Legislative Assembly election: Rangsakona
Party	Candidate	Votes	%	±%
NCP	Adolf Lu Hitler Marak	8,193	54.01%	▲14.87
INC	Zenith Sangma	6,354	41.89%	▲0.18
Independent	Nependroy Ch. Marak	312	2.06%	New
UDP	Dr. Sigstar D. Sangma	311	2.05%	▼6.48
Margin of victory		1,839	12.12%	▲9.56
Turnout		15,170	94.68%	▲16.21
Registered electors		16,022		▼3.84
NCP gain from INC		Swing	▲12.31	

=== Assembly Election 2003 ===
2003 Meghalaya Legislative Assembly election: Rangsakona
Party	Candidate	Votes	%	±%
INC	Zenith Sangma	5,452	41.70%	▼12.58
NCP	Adolf Lu Hitler Marak	5,117	39.14%	New
UDP	Glaxstone Marak	1,115	8.53%	▼4.39
PDM	Labindro Marak	691	5.29%	New
Independent	Stella Marie A. Sangma	385	2.94%	New
GNC	Rohidas Marak	314	2.40%	▼0.12
Margin of victory		335	2.56%	▼23.05
Turnout		13,074	78.48%	▲0.26
Registered electors		16,661		▲10.46
INC hold		Swing	▼12.58	

=== Assembly Election 1998 ===
1998 Meghalaya Legislative Assembly election: Rangsakona
Party	Candidate	Votes	%	±%
INC	Adolf Lu Hitler Marak	6,403	54.28%	▲5.10
Independent	Dipul R. Marak	3,382	28.67%	New
UDP	Chesterfield Marak	1,524	12.92%	New
GNC	Jimonsing Marak	297	2.52%	New
Independent	Krehot Marak	191	1.62%	New
Margin of victory		3,021	25.61%	▲2.30
Turnout		11,797	80.53%	▼4.47
Registered electors		15,083		▲12.03
INC hold		Swing	▲5.10	

=== Assembly Election 1993 ===
1993 Meghalaya Legislative Assembly election: Rangsakona
Party	Candidate	Votes	%	±%
INC	Adolf Lu Hitler Marak	5,474	49.17%	▲32.82
MPPP	Chesterfield Marak	2,879	25.86%	New
HPU	Clement Marak	1,516	13.62%	▼25.02
AHL(AM)	Sanford Marak	1,263	11.35%	New
Margin of victory		2,595	23.31%	▲13.62
Turnout		11,132	85.10%	▲2.84
Registered electors		13,463		▲17.92
INC gain from HPU		Swing	▲10.54	

=== Assembly Election 1988 ===
1988 Meghalaya Legislative Assembly election: Rangsakona
Party	Candidate	Votes	%	±%
HPU	Chesterfield Marak	3,522	38.64%	New
Independent	Pipinson Momin	2,639	28.95%	New
INC	Joylance Momin	1,491	16.36%	▼20.48
Margin of victory		883	9.69%	▲7.40
Turnout		9,116	83.31%	▲8.14
Registered electors		11,417		▲14.02
HPU gain from INC		Swing		

=== Assembly Election 1983 ===
1983 Meghalaya Legislative Assembly election: Rangsakona
Party	Candidate	Votes	%	±%
INC	Pipinson Momin	2,645	36.84%	▼2.22
APHLC	Jenden Ch. Marak	2,481	34.55%	▼26.39
Independent	Nanggin Marak	1,215	16.92%	New
Independent	Chesterfield Marak	737	10.26%	New
HSPDP	Hercules R. Marak	102	1.42%	New
Margin of victory		164	2.28%	▼19.61
Turnout		7,180	74.93%	▲5.11
Registered electors		10,013		▲15.40
INC gain from APHLC		Swing	▼24.11	

=== Assembly Election 1978 ===
1978 Meghalaya Legislative Assembly election: Rangsakona
Party	Candidate	Votes	%	±%
APHLC	Jenden Ch. Marak	3,522	60.94%	▼0.20
INC	Sanford Marak	2,257	39.06%	New
Margin of victory		1,265	21.89%	▼0.39
Turnout		5,779	70.80%	▲22.75
Registered electors		8,677		▲51.64
APHLC hold		Swing	▼0.20	

=== Assembly Election 1972 ===
1972 Meghalaya Legislative Assembly election: Rangsakona
Party	Candidate	Votes	%	±%
APHLC	Sanford Marak	1,534	61.14%	New
Independent	Jenden Ch. Marak	975	38.86%	New
Margin of victory		559	22.28%	
Turnout		2,509	47.36%	
Registered electors		5,722		
APHLC win (new seat)				

== See also ==
- List of constituencies of the Meghalaya Legislative Assembly
- South West Garo Hills district
