= Enowell Pohshna =

Indian politician

Member, Meghalaya Legislative Assembly
- In office 1972–1978
- Constituency: Nongtalang

Personal details
- Party: Independent

Enowell Pohshna was an Indian politician from Meghalaya who represented the Nongtalang constituency in the Meghalaya Legislative Assembly.

== Political career ==
He was elected to the Meghalaya assembly in the state's first assembly election, held on 9 March 1972, running as an independent candidate. He won the Nongtalang seat in East Jaintia Hills district with 2,426 votes against her nearest rival, Johndeng Pohrmen of the All Party Hill Leaders Conference.
