= Sanford Marak =

Indian politician (born 1934)

Member of Parliament, Lok Sabha
- In office 1989–1991
- Preceded by: Purno Agitok Sangma
- Succeeded by: Purno Agitok Sangma
- Constituency: Tura, Meghalaya

Personal details
- Born: 28 June 1934 Tura, West Garo Hills District, Assam, British India (present-day Meghalaya, India)
- Party: Indian National Congress

Sanford Marak (born 28 June 1934) is an Indian politician. He was elected to the Lok Sabha, the lower house of the Parliament of India from the Tura constituency of Meghalaya as a member of the Indian National Congress.

== Electoral performance ==
Election	Constituency	Party	Result	Votes %	Opposition Candidate	Opposition Party	Opposition vote %	Ref
1993	Rangsakona	AHL(AM)	Lost	11.35%	Adolf Lu Hitler Marak	INC	49.17%	
1978	Rangsakona	INC	Lost	39.06%	Jenden Ch. Marak	APHLC	60.94%	
1972	Rangsakona	APHLC	Won	61.14%	Jenden Ch. Marak	Independent	38.86%	
