= Manirul Islam Sarkar =

Meghalaya politician

- মনিরুল ইসলাম সরকার

Member of Meghalaya Legislative Assembly
- In office 1993–1998
- Preceded by: Parimal Rava
- Succeeded by: Abu Taher Mondal
- Constituency: Phulbari

Personal details
- Born: 1965 Chibinang, Meghalaya
- Died: 3 December 2017 (aged 51–52) Guwahati, Assam
- Party: Indian National Congress (2008); Samajwadi Party (2013) National People's Party (2014–2017)
- Children: 1 son, 2 daughters
- Relatives: S. G. Esmatur Mominin (brother)
- Education: Gauhati University

Manirul Islam Sarkar (Bengali: মনিরুল ইসলাম সরকার; 1965 – 3 December 2017) was an Indian Bengali politician and teacher. He was a former two-time member of the Meghalaya Legislative Assembly for the Phulbari Assembly Constituency in West Garo Hills district. Sarkar was also the Cabinet Minister for Agriculture and Transport.

== Early life and education ==
Sarkar was born into a Bengali Muslim family in Chibinang, Meghalaya. His father was Abdul Jabbar Sarkar. Sarkar graduated from Gauhati University in 1989 with a Bachelor of Science honour.

== Career ==
Sarkar began his career as a teacher before stepping into politics. Despite being an independent candidate, he defeated his rival Akramozzaman of the Indian National Congress in the 1993 Meghalaya Legislative Assembly election, being elected from the Phulbari constituency. He lost to Abu Taher Mondal in the 1998 Meghalaya Legislative Assembly election, but made a comeback in the 2003 Meghalaya Legislative Assembly election. He competed in the 2008 Meghalaya Legislative Assembly election as an Indian National Congress candidate and in the 2013 Meghalaya Legislative Assembly election as a Samajwadi Party candidate but was defeated again by Abu Taher Mondal. In 2014, he joined the National People's Party.

He has purchased vast amounts of land in Bholarbhita, Goladighli and Bangalkata. Sarkar also served as the chairman for Meghalaya Transport Corporation and the Minister of Agriculture & Transport.

== Later life and death ==
He later migrated to Guwahati in Assam where he established himself at the Meghalaya House. Sarkar suffered from a heart attack on 1 November 2017 and taken to hospital. He went to Chennai on 9 November and had a successful operation, returning to Guwahati on 17 November. As a result of a second heart attack, Sarkar died on 3 December 2017. His funeral, conducted in his home village of Chibinang in Meghalaya, was attended by thousands including the senior representatives of the National People's Party as well as his political rival Abu Taher Mondal. Among his brothers is politician S G Esmatur Mominin.
