= Salmanpara Assembly constituency =

Legislative Assembly constituency in Meghalaya State, India

Coordinates: 25.41°N 90.04°E

Salmanpara
- Constituency No. 55 for the Meghalaya Legislative Assembly

Constituency details
- Country: India
- Region: Northeast India
- State: Meghalaya
- District: South West Garo Hills
- Lok Sabha constituency: Tura
- Established: 1972
- Total electors: 31,067
- Reservation: ST

Member of Legislative Assembly
- 11th Meghalaya Legislative Assembly
- Incumbent Ian Botham Sangma
- Party: NPP
- Alliance: NDA
- Elected year: 2023

Salmanpara is one of the 60 Legislative Assembly constituencies of Meghalaya state in India.

It is part of South West Garo Hills district and is reserved for candidates belonging to the Scheduled Tribes. As of 2023, it is represented by Ian Botham Sangma of the National People's Party.

== Members of the Legislative Assembly ==
Election	Member	Party
1972	Samarendra Sangma	All Party Hill Leaders Conference
1978	Meckenson Sangma	Independent politician
1983	Meckenson Sangma	All Party Hill Leaders Conference
1988	Nimarson Momin	Independent politician
1993	Gopinath Sangma	Indian National Congress
1998	Nimarson Momin	United Democratic Party
2003	Gopinath Sangma	Nationalist Congress Party
2008	Nimarson Momin	United Democratic Party
2013	Winnerson D. Sangma	Indian National Congress
2018	Winnerson D. Sangma	Indian National Congress
2023	Ian Botham K. Sangma	National People's Party

== Election results ==
=== Assembly Election 2023 ===
2023 Meghalaya Legislative Assembly election: Salmanpara
Party	Candidate	Votes	%	±%
NPP	Ian Botham K. Sangma	11,352	42.26%	▲22.90
AITC	Winnerson D. Sangma	6,114	22.76%	New
BJP	Boston Marak	5,600	20.85%	▲3.79
UDP	Ronald Rikman Sangma	2,766	10.30%	▲4.56
INC	Sinbath Ch Marak	1,029	3.83%	▼23.42
NOTA	None of the Above	270	1.01%	▲0.30
Margin of victory		5,238	19.50%	▲11.61
Turnout		26,861	86.46%	▼5.94
Registered electors		31,067		▲18.29
NPP gain from INC		Swing	▲15.01	

=== Assembly Election 2018 ===
2018 Meghalaya Legislative Assembly election: Salmanpara
Party	Candidate	Votes	%	±%
INC	Winnerson D. Sangma	6,613	27.25%	▼7.65
NPP	Ian Botham K. Sangma	4,698	19.36%	▼5.88
BJP	Bhupendra B. Hajong	4,140	17.06%	▲1.54
GNC	Boston Marak	3,627	14.95%	New
NCP	Rightious N. Sangma	2,646	10.90%	New
UDP	Nimarson Momin	1,392	5.74%	▼3.13
Independent	Ronald Rikman Sangma	714	2.94%	New
NOTA	None of the Above	170	0.70%	New
Margin of victory		1,915	7.89%	▼1.77
Turnout		24,267	92.40%	▲0.21
Registered electors		26,263		▲23.84
INC hold		Swing	▼7.65	

=== Assembly Election 2013 ===
2013 Meghalaya Legislative Assembly election: Salmanpara
Party	Candidate	Votes	%	±%
INC	Winnerson D. Sangma	6,824	34.90%	▲23.44
NPP	Boston Marak	4,935	25.24%	New
BJP	Bhupendra B. Hajong	3,034	15.52%	New
Independent	Rightious N. Sangma	1,789	9.15%	New
UDP	Grebith D. Sangma	1,734	8.87%	▼23.35
Independent	Kenedy Marak	892	4.56%	New
Independent	Drembar Ch. Marak	343	1.75%	New
Margin of victory		1,889	9.66%	▲5.45
Turnout		19,551	92.19%	▲2.03
Registered electors		21,208		▲9.39
INC gain from UDP		Swing	▲2.68	

=== Assembly Election 2008 ===
2008 Meghalaya Legislative Assembly election: Salmanpara
Party	Candidate	Votes	%	±%
UDP	Nimarson Momin	5,632	32.22%	▼4.23
Independent	Boston Marak	4,895	28.01%	New
NCP	Gopinath Sangma	3,161	18.08%	▼23.95
INC	Semford B. Sangma	2,003	11.46%	▼1.89
Independent	Grebith D. Sangma	1,788	10.23%	New
Margin of victory		737	4.22%	▼1.37
Turnout		17,479	90.15%	▲13.19
Registered electors		19,388		▼1.08
UDP gain from NCP		Swing	▼9.82	

=== Assembly Election 2003 ===
2003 Meghalaya Legislative Assembly election: Salmanpara
Party	Candidate	Votes	%	±%
NCP	Gopinath Sangma	6,341	42.04%	New
UDP	Nimarson Momin	5,498	36.45%	▼1.84
INC	Semford B. Sangma	2,014	13.35%	▼18.83
BJP	Ismail A. Sangma	878	5.82%	New
Independent	Meckenson Sangma	353	2.34%	New
Margin of victory		843	5.59%	▼0.52
Turnout		15,084	76.96%	▲4.65
Registered electors		19,599		▲10.03
NCP gain from UDP		Swing	▲3.74	

=== Assembly Election 1998 ===
1998 Meghalaya Legislative Assembly election: Salmanpara
Party	Candidate	Votes	%	±%
UDP	Nimarson Momin	4,933	38.29%	New
INC	Gopinath Sangma	4,146	32.18%	▼8.00
Independent	Metalson Sangma	1,495	11.61%	New
GNC	Meckenson Sangma	1,181	9.17%	New
Independent	Ismail A. Sangma	1,127	8.75%	New
Margin of victory		787	6.11%	▲2.63
Turnout		12,882	75.06%	▼7.13
Registered electors		17,813		▲16.11
UDP gain from INC		Swing	▼1.89	

=== Assembly Election 1993 ===
1993 Meghalaya Legislative Assembly election: Salmanpara
Party	Candidate	Votes	%	±%
INC	Gopinath Sangma	4,898	40.19%	▲27.07
Independent	Nimarson Momin	4,474	36.71%	New
HPU	Meckenson Sangma	2,816	23.10%	▼1.79
Margin of victory		424	3.48%	▼20.61
Turnout		12,188	81.41%	▲2.13
Registered electors		15,341		▲23.25
INC gain from Independent		Swing		

=== Assembly Election 1988 ===
1988 Meghalaya Legislative Assembly election: Salmanpara
Party	Candidate	Votes	%	±%
Independent	Nimarson Momin	4,714	48.98%	New
HPU	Metalson Sangma	2,396	24.90%	New
INC	Gopinath Sangma	1,262	13.11%	▼14.34
Margin of victory		2,318	24.09%	▲20.66
Turnout		9,624	80.04%	▲7.87
Registered electors		12,447		▲16.63
Independent gain from APHLC		Swing		

=== Assembly Election 1983 ===
1983 Meghalaya Legislative Assembly election: Salmanpara
Party	Candidate	Votes	%	±%
APHLC	Meckenson Sangma	2,289	30.88%	▲18.09
INC	Nimarson Momin	2,035	27.46%	▲4.30
Independent	Noho Sangma	1,667	22.49%	New
Independent	Samarendra Sangma	635	8.57%	New
Independent	Bilson S. Sangma	540	7.29%	New
HSPDP	Ronsing Dangsu	246	3.32%	New
Margin of victory		254	3.43%	▼32.24
Turnout		7,412	72.99%	▲8.26
Registered electors		10,672		▲10.21
APHLC gain from Independent		Swing	▼27.94	

=== Assembly Election 1978 ===
1978 Meghalaya Legislative Assembly election: Salmanpara
Party	Candidate	Votes	%	±%
Independent	Meckenson Sangma	3,485	58.82%	New
INC	Samarendro Sangma	1,372	23.16%	New
APHLC	Bilson S. Sangma	758	12.79%	▼87.21
Independent	Ronsing Dangsu	310	5.23%	New
Margin of victory		2,113	35.66%	
Turnout		5,925	64.88%	▼38.81
Registered electors		9,683		▲53.19
Independent gain from APHLC		Swing	▼41.18	

=== Assembly Election 1972 ===
1972 Meghalaya Legislative Assembly election: Salmanpara
Party		Candidate	Votes	%	±%
	APHLC	Samarendra Sangma	Unopposed		
change= }}
Registered electors			6,321		
	APHLC win (new seat)				

== See also ==
- List of constituencies of the Meghalaya Legislative Assembly
- South West Garo Hills district
