= Winnerson D. Sangma =

Indian politician

Winnerson D. Sangma (born 6 February 1970) is an Indian politician from Meghalaya. He is a former member of the Meghalaya Legislative Assembly from the Salmanpara Assembly constituency, which is reserved for the Scheduled Tribe community, in the South West Garo Hills district representing the Indian National Congress in 2013 and 2018.

== Early life ==
Sangma is from Anangpara Christian village, Ampati post, South West Garo Hills district, Meghalaya. He is the son of the late Kilga A. Marak. He completed his BA and did BEd at North Eastern Hills University (NEHU) in 1995. He passed the Meghalaya Civil Service examinations in 2000 and joined the state service. He declared assets worth Rs.1 crore in his affidavit to the Election Commission of India.

== Career ==
Sangma became an MLA for the first time winning the Salmanpara Assembly constituency in the 2013 Meghalaya Legislative Assembly election representing the Indian National Congress. He polled 6,824 votes and defeated his nearest rival, Boston Marak of the National People's Party (India), by 1,889 votes. He retained the Salmanpara seat for the Indian National Congress winning the 2018 Meghalaya Legislative Assembly election where he polled 6,613 votes and beat his closest opponent, Ian Botham K. Sangma of the National People's Party (India), by 1,915.

In March 2024, he joined Bharatiya Janata Party.
