= Himalaya Muktan Shangpliang =

Indian politician

Himalaya Muktan Shangpliang (born 13 August 1962) is an Indian politician from Meghalaya. He is a former member of the Meghalaya Legislative Assembly from the Mawsynram Assembly constituency which is reserved for the Scheduled Tribe community in the East Khasi Hills district representing the Indian National Congress in 2018. Later he shifted to the Bharatiya Janata Party.but lost the 2023 election on the BJP ticket.

== Early life ==
Shangpliang is from Mawsynram, East Khasi Hills district, Meghalaya. He is the son of the late Sidona Shangliang. He completed his BA (honours) at a college affiliated with North Eastern Hill University in 1983. He declared assets worth Rs.16 crores in 2018 and Rs.20 crore in 2023, in his affidavits to the Election Commission of India.

== Career ==
Shangpliang won the Mawsynram Assembly constituency in the 2018 Meghalaya Legislative Assembly election representing the Indian National Congress. He polled 8,984 votes and defeated his nearest rival, Pynshngainlang Syiem of the People's Democratic Front (Meghalaya), by 794 votes. Later, he shifted to the Bharatiya Janata Party and contested the 2023 Meghalaya Legislative Assembly election on the BJP ticket but lost to Ollan Singh Suin of the United Democratic Party (Meghalaya), by 955 votes.
