= Tikrikilla Assembly constituency =

Legislative Assembly constituency in Meghalaya State, India

Coordinates: 25.92°N 90.15°E

Tikrikilla
- Constituency No. 45 for the Meghalaya Legislative Assembly

Constituency details
- Country: India
- Region: Northeast India
- State: Meghalaya
- District: West Garo Hills
- Lok Sabha constituency: Tura
- Established: 1972
- Total electors: 36,080
- Reservation: ST

Member of Legislative Assembly
- 11th Meghalaya Legislative Assembly
- Incumbent Jimmy Sangma
- Party: NPP
- Alliance: NDA
- Elected year: 2023

Tikrikilla is one of the 60 Legislative Assembly constituencies of Meghalaya state in India.

It is part of West Garo Hills district and is reserved for candidates belonging to the Scheduled Tribes.

== Members of the Legislative Assembly ==
Election	Member	Party
1972	Monindra Rava	All Party Hill Leaders Conference
1978	Jagendranath Bantha	Independent politician
1983	Monindra Rava	Indian National Congress
1988	Kapin Ch. Boro	Independent politician
1993	Monindra Rava	Meghalaya Progressive People's Party
1998	Mohindra Rava	Indian National Congress
2003	Mohindra Rava	Nationalist Congress Party
2008	Limison Sangma	Independent politician
2013	Michael T. Sangma	Independent politician
2018	Jimmy Sangma	Indian National Congress
2023	Jimmy Sangma	National People's Party

== Election results ==
=== Assembly Election 2023 ===
2023 Meghalaya Legislative Assembly election: Tikrikilla
Party	Candidate	Votes	%	±%
NPP	Jimmy Sangma	13,218	41.81%	▲38.80
AITC	Dr. Mukul Sangma	7,905	25.00%	New
BJP	Rahinath Barchung	7,849	24.83%	▲11.75
INC	Dr. Kapin Ch. Boro	1,233	3.90%	▼22.02
Independent	Noor Nongrum	1,098	3.47%	New
UDP	Julius T. Sangma	313	0.99%	New
NOTA	None of the Above	298	0.94%	▲0.01
Margin of victory		5,313	16.80%	▲11.72
Turnout		31,616	87.63%	▼1.76
Registered electors		36,080		▲16.64
NPP gain from INC		Swing	▲15.89	

=== Assembly Election 2018 ===
2018 Meghalaya Legislative Assembly election: Tikrikilla
Party	Candidate	Votes	%	±%
INC	Jimmy Sangma	7,167	25.92%	▲2.36
Independent	Rahinath Barchung	5,760	20.83%	New
Independent	Sayeedullah Nongrum	5,371	19.43%	New
BJP	Dr. Kapin Ch. Boro	3,615	13.07%	New
Independent	Michael T. Sangma	2,318	8.38%	New
NCP	Nilkamal D. Sangma	1,110	4.01%	▲1.29
NPP	Augustine D. Marak	833	3.01%	New
NOTA	None of the Above	258	0.93%	New
Margin of victory		1,407	5.09%	▼2.49
Turnout		27,649	89.38%	▼0.97
Registered electors		30,933		▲24.41
INC gain from Independent		Swing	▼5.21	

=== Assembly Election 2013 ===
2013 Meghalaya Legislative Assembly election: Tikrikilla
Party	Candidate	Votes	%	±%
Independent	Michael T. Sangma	6,995	31.14%	New
INC	Rahinath Barchung	5,293	23.56%	▲6.43
Independent	Jimmy Sangma	4,158	18.51%	New
Independent	Kapin Ch. Boro	3,146	14.00%	New
SP	Benedict Marak	736	3.28%	New
NCP	Mrinal Marak	612	2.72%	▼10.40
Independent	Serazul H. Kharkongor	471	2.10%	New
Margin of victory		1,702	7.58%	▲1.21
Turnout		22,466	90.36%	▲1.15
Registered electors		24,864		▲40.18
Independent hold		Swing	▼4.15	

=== Assembly Election 2008 ===
2008 Meghalaya Legislative Assembly election: Tikrikilla
Party	Candidate	Votes	%	±%
Independent	Limison Sangma	5,583	35.29%	New
Independent	Nagendra Rabha	4,576	28.92%	New
INC	Monindra Rava	2,711	17.13%	▼7.71
NCP	Mrinal Marak	2,077	13.13%	▼16.12
BJP	Bidur A. Sangma	551	3.48%	New
Independent	Pillarson G. Momin	324	2.05%	New
Margin of victory		1,007	6.36%	▲1.95
Turnout		15,822	89.20%	▲14.65
Registered electors		17,737		▼12.80
Independent gain from NCP		Swing	▲6.03	

=== Assembly Election 2003 ===
2003 Meghalaya Legislative Assembly election: Tikrikilla
Party	Candidate	Votes	%	±%
NCP	Mohindra Rava	4,436	29.25%	New
INC	Kapin Ch. Boro	3,767	24.84%	▼10.33
PDM	Lemison Sangma	3,738	24.65%	New
UDP	Mrinal Marak	2,009	13.25%	▲12.94
Independent	Pillarson G. Momin	1,215	8.01%	New
Margin of victory		669	4.41%	▼3.36
Turnout		15,165	74.55%	▼0.85
Registered electors		20,341		▲16.79
NCP gain from INC		Swing	▼5.91	

=== Assembly Election 1998 ===
1998 Meghalaya Legislative Assembly election: Tikrikilla
Party	Candidate	Votes	%	±%
INC	Mohindra Rava	4,618	35.17%	▲6.79
Independent	Nagendra Rabha	3,598	27.40%	New
Independent	Pillarson G. Momin	2,169	16.52%	New
Independent	Widnald Momin	1,379	10.50%	New
GNC	Ashes Daring	1,328	10.11%	New
UDP	Ashu M. Sangma	40	0.30%	New
Margin of victory		1,020	7.77%	▲6.47
Turnout		13,132	77.84%	▼11.12
Registered electors		17,416		▲17.87
INC gain from MPPP		Swing	▼1.30	

=== Assembly Election 1993 ===
1993 Meghalaya Legislative Assembly election: Tikrikilla
Party	Candidate	Votes	%	±%
MPPP	Monindra Rava	4,661	36.46%	New
HPU	Pillarson G. Momin	4,495	35.16%	▲26.99
INC	Kapin Ch. Boro	3,627	28.37%	▲1.71
Margin of victory		166	1.30%	▼5.95
Turnout		12,783	88.64%	▲2.78
Registered electors		14,775		▲19.19
MPPP gain from Independent		Swing		

=== Assembly Election 1988 ===
1988 Meghalaya Legislative Assembly election: Tikrikilla
Party	Candidate	Votes	%	±%
Independent	Kapin Ch. Boro	3,520	33.91%	New
INC	Monindra Rava	2,768	26.67%	▼18.96
Independent	Pillarson G. Momin	2,528	24.35%	New
HPU	Ankhoram Rava	848	8.17%	New
Independent	Ketchiner Sangma	716	6.90%	New
Margin of victory		752	7.24%	▼10.78
Turnout		10,380	85.93%	▲6.99
Registered electors		12,396		▲30.98
Independent gain from INC		Swing	▼11.72	

=== Assembly Election 1983 ===
1983 Meghalaya Legislative Assembly election: Tikrikilla
Party	Candidate	Votes	%	±%
INC	Monindra Rava	3,314	45.63%	▲14.93
HSPDP	Bipin Daring	2,005	27.61%	New
APHLC	Pillarson G. Momin	1,068	14.70%	▲8.96
Independent	Rangaram Daimari	483	6.65%	New
Independent	Morison Daring	393	5.41%	New
Margin of victory		1,309	18.02%	▲14.65
Turnout		7,263	80.14%	▲5.66
Registered electors		9,464		▲13.97
INC gain from Independent		Swing	▲11.56	

=== Assembly Election 1978 ===
1978 Meghalaya Legislative Assembly election: Tikrikilla
Party	Candidate	Votes	%	±%
Independent	Jagendranath Bantha	2,011	34.07%	New
INC	Monindra Rava	1,812	30.70%	New
Independent	Dinesh Ch. Sangma	1,741	29.49%	New
APHLC	Levisond Sangma	339	5.74%	▼53.37
Margin of victory		199	3.37%	▼14.86
Turnout		5,903	74.80%	▲6.50
Registered electors		8,304		▲13.20
Independent gain from APHLC		Swing	▼25.05	

=== Assembly Election 1972 ===
1972 Meghalaya Legislative Assembly election: Tikrikilla
Party	Candidate	Votes	%	±%
APHLC	Monindra Rava	2,801	59.12%	New
Independent	Nurali Slam	1,937	40.88%	New
Margin of victory		864	18.24%	
Turnout		4,738	69.38%	
Registered electors		7,336		
APHLC win (new seat)				

== See also ==
- List of constituencies of the Meghalaya Legislative Assembly
- West Garo Hills district
