= Subir Marak =

Indian politician

Subir Marak (born 1975) is an Indian politician from Meghalaya. He is a member of the Meghalaya Legislative Assembly from the Rangsakona Assembly constituency, which is reserved for Scheduled Tribe community, in West Garo Hills district. He was first elected in the 2023 Meghalaya Legislative Assembly election representing the National People's Party (India).

== Early life and education ==
Marak is from Boiragipara village, Garobadha post, Ampati, South West Garo Hills district, Meghalaya. He is the son of Gonendra Sangma. He completed his degree in civil engineering in 1996 at Shillong Polytechnic. His wife is a headmistress at a private school.

== Career ==
Marak won the Rangsakona Assembly constituency representing National People's Party (India) in the 2023 Meghalaya Legislative Assembly election. He polled 13,605 votes and defeated his nearest rival, Zenith M. Sangma of All India Trinamool Congress, by a margin of 788 votes.
