= Benedic Marak =

Indian politician

Benedic Marak (born 12 September 1984) is an Indian politician from Meghalaya. He is a former member of the Meghalaya Legislative Assembly from the Raksamgre Assembly constituency which is reserved for Scheduled Tribe community in West Garo Hills district representing the National People's Party in 2014. Later, he contested on the Bharatiya Janata Party ticket in 2023 but lost the election.

== Early life ==
Marak is from Raksamgre, West Garo Hills district, Meghalaya. He is the son of Saroj C. Sangma. He studied up to Class 12 and later did his graduation from Indira Gandhi National Open University. He declared assets worth Rs.27 lakhs in 2018 and Rs.3 crore in 2023, in his affidavits to the Election Commission of India.

== Career ==
Marak won the Raksamgre Assembly constituency in the 2018 Meghalaya Legislative Assembly election representing the National People's Party. He polled 9,104 votes and defeated his nearest rival, Limison D. Sangma of the Indian National Congress by 624 votes. He later moved to the Bharatiya Janata Party and contested the 2023 Meghalaya Legislative Assembly election but lost to Limison Sangma, who contested on the NPP ticket this time around. Marak polled 9,366 votes and lost by a margin of 2,818 votes.
