= Phulbari Assembly constituency =

Legislative Assembly constituency in Meghalaya State, India

Coordinates: 25.89°N 90.02°E

Phulbari
- Constituency No. 46 for the Meghalaya Legislative Assembly

Constituency details
- Country: India
- Region: Northeast India
- State: Meghalaya
- District: West Garo Hills
- Lok Sabha constituency: Tura
- Established: 1972
- Total electors: 32,587
- Reservation: None

Member of Legislative Assembly
- 11th Meghalaya Legislative Assembly
- Incumbent Abu Taher Mondal
- Party: NPP
- Alliance: NDA
- Elected year: 2023
- Preceded by: S. G. Esmatur Mominin

Phulbari Legislative Assembly constituency is one of 60 Legislative Assembly constituencies of Meghalaya state in India. It is part of the West Garo Hills district.

== Members of the Legislative Assembly ==
| Year | Member | Party |
Assam
| 1952 | Emonsing M Sangma | Independent politician |
| 1957 | Williamson A. Sangma | Independent politician |
| 1962 | Emonsing M Sangma | Indian National Congress |
| 1967 | Bronson Momin | All Party Hill Leaders Conference |
Megalaya
| 1972 | Akramozzaman | Indian National Congress |
| 1978 | Akramozzaman | Indian National Congress |
| 1983 | Parimal Rava | All Party Hill Leaders Conference |
| 1988 | Parimal Rava | Hill People's Union |
| 1993 | Manirul Islam Sarkar | Independent politician |
| 1998 | Abu Taher Mondal | Independent politician |
| 2003 | Manirul Islam Sarkar | Indian National Congress |
| 2008 | Abu Taher Mondal | Independent politician |
| 2013 | Abu Taher Mondal | Indian National Congress |
| 2018 | S. G. Esmatur Mominin | National People's Party |
| 2023 | Abu Taher Mondal | National People's Party |

== Election results ==
=== Assembly Election 2023 ===
2023 Meghalaya Legislative Assembly election: Phulbari
| Party | Candidate | Votes | % | ±% |
|---|---|---|---|---|
| NPP | Abu Taher Mondal | 14,969 | 51.02% | ▲20.23 |
| AITC | S. G. Esmatur Mominin | 11,729 | 39.98% | New |
| BJP | Edmund K. Sangma | 1,856 | 6.33% | ▼11.91 |
| UDP | Zinbaward N. Sangma | 400 | 1.36% | New |
| INC | Sailendra R. Sangma | 318 | 1.08% | ▼25.18 |
| NOTA | None of the Above | 219 | 0.75% | ▼1.13 |
| Margin of victory | | 3,240 | 11.04% | ▲6.52 |
| Turnout | | 29,340 | 90.04% | ▼3.02 |
| Registered electors | | 32,587 | | ▲20.99 |
| NPP hold | | Swing | ▲20.23 | |

=== Assembly Election 2018 ===
2018 Meghalaya Legislative Assembly election: Phulbari
| Party | Candidate | Votes | % | ±% |
|---|---|---|---|---|
| NPP | S. G. Esmatur Mominin | 7,716 | 30.79% | ▲23.08 |
| INC | Abu Taher Mondal | 6,582 | 26.26% | ▲2.81 |
| Independent | Mark Goera B. Marak | 5,527 | 22.05% | New |
| BJP | Binoy Kumar Ghosh | 4,570 | 18.23% | New |
| NOTA | None of the Above | 470 | 1.88% | New |
| Margin of victory | | 1,134 | 4.52% | ▲2.10 |
| Turnout | | 25,063 | 93.05% | ▲1.26 |
| Registered electors | | 26,934 | | ▲20.02 |
| NPP gain from INC | | Swing | ▲7.34 | |

=== Assembly Election 2013 ===
2013 Meghalaya Legislative Assembly election: Phulbari
| Party | Candidate | Votes | % | ±% |
|---|---|---|---|---|
| INC | Abu Taher Mondal | 4,831 | 23.45% | ▲1.70 |
| Independent | Mark Goera B. Marak | 4,332 | 21.03% | New |
| Independent | Binoy Kumar Ghosh | 4,121 | 20.00% | New |
| SP | Manirul Islam Sarkar | 3,922 | 19.04% | New |
| NPP | Sader Hossain | 1,587 | 7.70% | New |
| Independent | Sylvester Bulu Sangma | 953 | 4.63% | New |
| Independent | Abdus Saffur Mondal | 492 | 2.39% | New |
| Margin of victory | | 499 | 2.42% | ▼7.94 |
| Turnout | | 20,601 | 91.80% | ▲1.36 |
| Registered electors | | 22,442 | | ▼13.01 |
| INC gain from Independent | | Swing | ▼8.66 | |

=== Assembly Election 2008 ===
2008 Meghalaya Legislative Assembly election: Phulbari
| Party | Candidate | Votes | % | ±% |
|---|---|---|---|---|
| Independent | Abu Taher Mondal | 7,492 | 32.11% | New |
| INC | Manirul Islam Sarkar | 5,074 | 21.75% | ▼16.18 |
| NCP | Sader Hossain | 4,655 | 19.95% | ▼9.74 |
| Independent | Binoy Kumar Ghosh | 4,616 | 19.79% | New |
| Independent | Sofiar Rahman Hazarika | 712 | 3.05% | New |
| Independent | Azizuz Zaman Ebne Akram | 460 | 1.97% | New |
| BJP | Parimal Rabha | 321 | 1.38% | ▼28.34 |
| Margin of victory | | 2,418 | 10.36% | ▲2.14 |
| Turnout | | 23,330 | 90.43% | ▲9.22 |
| Registered electors | | 25,798 | | ▲10.84 |
| Independent gain from INC | | Swing | ▼5.82 | |

=== Assembly Election 2003 ===
2003 Meghalaya Legislative Assembly election: Phulbari
| Party | Candidate | Votes | % | ±% |
|---|---|---|---|---|
| INC | Manirul Islam Sarkar | 7,170 | 37.93% | ▲24.84 |
| BJP | Aperson G. Momin | 5,616 | 29.71% | ▲12.61 |
| NCP | Abu Taher Mondal | 5,612 | 29.69% | New |
| UDP | Aynal Haque Hazarika | 259 | 1.37% | ▼13.74 |
| SP | Anowar Islam | 245 | 1.30% | New |
| Margin of victory | | 1,554 | 8.22% | ▲7.05 |
| Turnout | | 18,902 | 81.21% | ▲0.33 |
| Registered electors | | 23,275 | | ▲7.95 |
| INC gain from Independent | | Swing | ▲17.31 | |

=== Assembly Election 1998 ===
1998 Meghalaya Legislative Assembly election: Phulbari
| Party | Candidate | Votes | % | ±% |
|---|---|---|---|---|
| Independent | Abu Taher Mondal | 3,597 | 20.63% | New |
| Independent | Manirul Islam Sarkar | 3,393 | 19.46% | New |
| BJP | Parimal Rabha | 2,983 | 17.11% | ▲0.46 |
| UDP | Aperson G. Momin | 2,635 | 15.11% | New |
| INC | Abdul Bari Sarkar | 2,283 | 13.09% | ▼8.50 |
| Independent | Sofiar Rahman Hazarika | 2,055 | 11.78% | New |
| GNC | Anindra Ch. Rabha | 214 | 1.23% | New |
| Margin of victory | | 204 | 1.17% | ▼3.94 |
| Turnout | | 17,439 | 83.37% | ▼6.23 |
| Registered electors | | 21,560 | | ▲20.12 |
| Independent hold | | Swing | ▼6.08 | |

=== Assembly Election 1993 ===
1993 Meghalaya Legislative Assembly election: Phulbari
| Party | Candidate | Votes | % | ±% |
|---|---|---|---|---|
| Independent | Manirul Islam Sarkar | 4,175 | 26.70% | New |
| INC | A. Kramoz Zaman | 3,376 | 21.59% | ▲2.40 |
| BJP | Final Ch. Rabha | 2,602 | 16.64% | New |
| HPU | Parimal Rabha | 2,595 | 16.60% | ▼13.30 |
| Independent | Sofiar Rahman Hazarika | 2,139 | 13.68% | New |
| Janata Dal (B) | Samsul Huda | 587 | 3.75% | New |
| CPI | Lutfur Prodhani | 161 | 1.03% | ▼0.29 |
| Margin of victory | | 799 | 5.11% | ▼5.60 |
| Turnout | | 15,635 | 88.34% | ▼0.57 |
| Registered electors | | 17,948 | | ▲22.27 |
| Independent gain from HPU | | Swing | ▼3.19 | |

=== Assembly Election 1988 ===
1988 Meghalaya Legislative Assembly election: Phulbari
| Party | Candidate | Votes | % | ±% |
|---|---|---|---|---|
| HPU | Parimal Rava | 3,848 | 29.90% | New |
| INC | Sofior Rahman Hazarika | 2,470 | 19.19% | ▼2.70 |
| Independent | Abdul Bari Sarkar | 2,144 | 16.66% | New |
| Independent | Samsul Huda | 1,997 | 15.52% | New |
| Independent | Khorshedur Rahman Khan | 1,586 | 12.32% | New |
| Independent | Ziaul Islam | 226 | 1.76% | New |
| CPI | Nirpendra Mishra | 170 | 1.32% | New |
| Margin of victory | | 1,378 | 10.71% | ▲7.35 |
| Turnout | | 12,871 | 89.39% | ▲2.37 |
| Registered electors | | 14,679 | | ▲22.95 |
| HPU gain from APHLC | | Swing | ▲2.99 | |

=== Assembly Election 1983 ===
1983 Meghalaya Legislative Assembly election: Phulbari
| Party | Candidate | Votes | % | ±% |
|---|---|---|---|---|
| APHLC | Parimal Rava | 2,740 | 26.90% | New |
| Independent | Sofier Rahman Hazarika | 2,398 | 23.54% | New |
| INC | Akramozzaman | 2,230 | 21.89% | ▼7.25 |
| Independent | Nurul Islam | 1,497 | 14.70% | New |
| Independent | Samsul Huda | 1,320 | 12.96% | New |
| Margin of victory | | 342 | 3.36% | ▲3.18 |
| Turnout | | 10,185 | 87.29% | ▲4.44 |
| Registered electors | | 11,939 | | ▲20.95 |
| APHLC gain from INC | | Swing | ▼2.25 | |

=== Assembly Election 1978 ===
1978 Meghalaya Legislative Assembly election: Phulbari
| Party | Candidate | Votes | % | ±% |
|---|---|---|---|---|
| INC | Akramozzaman | 2,327 | 29.15% | ▼24.63 |
| Independent | Sofiar Rahman Hazarika | 2,313 | 28.97% | New |
| Independent | Samsul Huda | 1,934 | 24.23% | New |
| Independent | Nural Islam | 1,409 | 17.65% | New |
| Margin of victory | | 14 | 0.18% | ▼7.39 |
| Turnout | | 7,983 | 83.23% | ▲16.10 |
| Registered electors | | 9,871 | | ▲65.65 |
| INC hold | | Swing | ▼24.63 | |

=== Assembly Election 1972 ===
1972 Meghalaya Legislative Assembly election: Phulbari
| Party | Candidate | Votes | % | ±% |
|---|---|---|---|---|
| INC | Akramozzaman | 2,076 | 53.78% | New |
| Independent | Majibhur Rahman | 1,784 | 46.22% | New |
| Margin of victory | | 292 | 7.56% | |
| Turnout | | 3,860 | 69.17% | |
| Registered electors | | 5,959 | | |
| INC win (new seat) | | | | |

== See also ==
- List of constituencies of the Meghalaya Legislative Assembly
- West Garo Hills district
