= S. G. Esmatur Mominin =

Meghalaya politician

Member of Meghalaya Legislative Assembly
- In office 2018–2023
- Preceded by: Abu Taher Mondal
- Succeeded by: Abu Taher Mondal
- Constituency: Phulbari

Personal details
- Born: 1976 (age 49–50) Chibinang, Meghalaya
- Party: All India Trinamool Congress (2023-present)
- Other political affiliations: National People's Party (2018-2023)
- Relatives: Manirul Islam Sarkar (brother)
- Education: Dhubri Law College

S. G. Esmatur Mominin is an Indian Bengali politician and lawyer, who served as the MLA for the Phulbari constituency in the Meghalaya Legislative Assembly from 2018 to 2023. He is also a member of the Garo Hills Autonomous District Council. He resigned from the NPP and joined the All India Trinamool Congress in January 2023.

== Early life and education ==
Mominin was born into a Bengali Muslim family in the village of Chibinang located in the Garo Hills of Meghalaya. His father was Abdul Jabbar Sarkar, and among his brothers is Lt. Manirul Islam Sarkar. His wife is a teacher at the Janapriya Higher Secondary School in Bholarbhita. Sarkar graduated from the Dhubri Law College in 2003 with a Bachelor of Laws degree. He owns land in Kaimbatapara and a building in Bholarbhita.

== Career ==
Sarkar began his career as a teacher before stepping into politics. As a National People's Party candidate, he defeated three-time MLA Abu Taher Mondal of the Indian National Congress at the 2018 Meghalaya Legislative Assembly election, being elected from the Phulbari Constituency.
