= George Bankyntiewlang Lyngdoh =

Indian politician

Member of Meghalaya Legislative Assembly
- In office 2018–2023
- Preceded by: Ngaitlang Dhar
- Succeeded by: Damanbait Lamare
- Constituency: Umroi

Personal details
- Born: 11 September 1978 (age 47)
- Party: AITC
- Occupation: Politician

George Bankyntiewlang Lyngdoh is a member of the Meghalaya Legislative Assembly from the Umroi constituency. Lyngdoh won the seat in the 2018 Meghalaya Legislative Assembly Elections. He is the son of former Chief Minister of Meghalaya Evansius Kek Mawlong. He is the Former General Secretary, Meghalaya Editor's And Publisher’s Association and is the President of the Umroi Block Congress Committee.

Lyngdoh was born on 11 September 1978, and has a Bachelor of Engineering (Electronic) degree.
