= Sutnga Assembly constituency =

Constituency of the Meghalaya legislative assembly in India

Sutnga
- Former constituency for the Meghalaya Legislative Assembly

Constituency details
- Country: India
- Region: Northeast India
- State: Meghalaya
- Established: 1972
- Abolished: 1977
- Total electors: 8,691

Sutnga Assembly constituency was an assembly constituency in the India state of Meghalaya.

== Members of the Legislative Assembly ==
Election	Member	Party
1972	Onward Leyswell Nongtdu	Independent politician

== Election results ==
=== Assembly Election 1972 ===
1972 Meghalaya Legislative Assembly election: Sutnga
Party	Candidate	Votes	%	±%
Independent	Onward Leyswell Nongtdu	2,411	39.55%	New
AHL	Beryl Sutnga	1,862	30.54%	New
INC	Rolbert Lw	1,823	29.90%	New
Margin of victory		549	9.01%	
Turnout		6,096	71.72%	
Registered electors		8,691		
Independent win (new seat)				
