= Resubelpara Assembly constituency =

Legislative Assembly constituency in Meghalaya State, India

Coordinates: 25.9°N 90.61°E

Resubelpara
- Constituency No. 39 for the Meghalaya Legislative Assembly

Constituency details
- Country: India
- Region: Northeast India
- State: Meghalaya
- District: North Garo Hills
- Lok Sabha constituency: Tura
- Established: 1972
- Total electors: 30,411
- Reservation: ST

Member of Legislative Assembly
- 11th Meghalaya Legislative Assembly
- Incumbent Timothy Shira
- Party: NPP
- Alliance: NDA
- Elected year: 2023

Resubelpara is one of the 60 Legislative Assembly constituencies of Meghalaya state in India.

It is part of North Garo Hills district and is reserved for candidates belonging to the Scheduled Tribes.

== Members of the Legislative Assembly ==
| Election | Name | Party |
|---|---|---|
| 1972 | Salseng C. Marak | All Party Hill Leaders Conference |
| 1978 | Salseng C. Marak | Indian National Congress |
| 1983 | Salseng C. Marak | Indian National Congress |
| 1988 | Salseng C. Marak | Indian National Congress |
| 1993 | Salseng C. Marak | Indian National Congress |
| 1998 | Salseng C. Marak | Indian National Congress |
| 2003 | Timothy Shira | Nationalist Congress Party |
| 2008 | Timothy Shira | Nationalist Congress Party |
| 2013 | Salseng C. Marak | Indian National Congress |
| 2018 | Timothy Shira | National People's Party |
| 2023 | Timothy Shira | National People's Party |

== Election results ==
=== Assembly Election 2023 ===
2023 Meghalaya Legislative Assembly election: Resubelpara
| Party | Candidate | Votes | % | ±% |
|---|---|---|---|---|
| NPP | Timothy Shira | 10,948 | 41.55% | ▲12.04 |
| AITC | Rinaldo K. Sangma | 7,483 | 28.40% | New |
| INC | Tweel K. Marak | 5,064 | 19.22% | ▼2.55 |
| BJP | Sukharam K. Sangma | 1,957 | 7.43% | New |
| Independent | Starline Momin | 602 | 2.28% | New |
| UDP | Taposh D. Marak | 292 | 1.11% | New |
| NOTA | None of the Above | 164 | 0.62% | ▼0.06 |
| Margin of victory | | 3,465 | 13.15% | ▲5.41 |
| Turnout | | 26,346 | 86.63% | ▼1.05 |
| Registered electors | | 30,411 | | ▲17.11 |
| NPP hold | | Swing | ▲12.04 | |

=== Assembly Election 2018 ===
2018 Meghalaya Legislative Assembly election: Resubelpara
| Party | Candidate | Votes | % | ±% |
|---|---|---|---|---|
| NPP | Timothy Shira | 6,720 | 29.52% | ▼14.09 |
| INC | Salseng C. Marak | 4,957 | 21.77% | ▼29.32 |
| Independent | Braze Adoneza G Momin | 3,224 | 14.16% | New |
| Independent | Tengrak R. Marak | 3,059 | 13.44% | New |
| NCP | Tweel K. Marak | 1,512 | 6.64% | New |
| Independent | Starline Momin | 1,221 | 5.36% | New |
| Independent | Manosh M Marak | 1,118 | 4.91% | New |
| NOTA | None of the Above | 155 | 0.68% | New |
| Margin of victory | | 1,763 | 7.74% | ▲0.26 |
| Turnout | | 22,768 | 87.68% | ▲2.09 |
| Registered electors | | 25,967 | | ▲25.20 |
| NPP gain from INC | | Swing | ▼21.57 | |

=== Assembly Election 2013 ===
2013 Meghalaya Legislative Assembly election: Resubelpara
| Party | Candidate | Votes | % | ±% |
|---|---|---|---|---|
| INC | Salseng C. Marak | 9,070 | 51.09% | ▲7.33 |
| NPP | Timothy Shira | 7,741 | 43.60% | New |
| UDP | Waran Sangma | 942 | 5.31% | New |
| Margin of victory | | 1,329 | 7.49% | ▲5.80 |
| Turnout | | 17,753 | 85.59% | ▼4.45 |
| Registered electors | | 20,741 | | ▲7.64 |
| INC gain from NCP | | Swing | | |

=== Assembly Election 2008 ===
2008 Meghalaya Legislative Assembly election: Resubelpara
| Party | Candidate | Votes | % | ±% |
|---|---|---|---|---|
| NCP | Timothy Shira | 7,884 | 45.44% | ▼7.89 |
| INC | Salseng C. Marak | 7,592 | 43.76% | ▼2.91 |
| Independent | Charansigh Marak | 1,874 | 10.80% | New |
| Margin of victory | | 292 | 1.68% | ▼4.98 |
| Turnout | | 17,350 | 90.05% | ▲16.97 |
| Registered electors | | 19,268 | | ▼5.62 |
| NCP hold | | Swing | | |

=== Assembly Election 2003 ===
2003 Meghalaya Legislative Assembly election: Resubelpara
| Party | Candidate | Votes | % | ±% |
|---|---|---|---|---|
| NCP | Timothy Shira | 7,957 | 53.33% | New |
| INC | Salseng C. Marak | 6,963 | 46.67% | ▼2.84 |
| Margin of victory | | 994 | 6.66% | ▲4.52 |
| Turnout | | 14,920 | 73.08% | ▲0.28 |
| Registered electors | | 20,416 | | ▲12.75 |
| NCP gain from INC | | Swing | | |

=== Assembly Election 1998 ===
1998 Meghalaya Legislative Assembly election: Resubelpara
| Party | Candidate | Votes | % | ±% |
|---|---|---|---|---|
| INC | Salseng C. Marak | 6,526 | 49.51% | ▼15.75 |
| UDP | Timothy Shira | 6,244 | 47.37% | New |
| Independent | David Sangma | 412 | 3.13% | New |
| Margin of victory | | 282 | 2.14% | ▼28.38 |
| Turnout | | 13,182 | 76.16% | ▼2.24 |
| Registered electors | | 18,108 | | ▲17.63 |
| INC hold | | Swing | | |

=== Assembly Election 1993 ===
1993 Meghalaya Legislative Assembly election: Resubelpara
| Party | Candidate | Votes | % | ±% |
|---|---|---|---|---|
| INC | Salseng C. Marak | 7,538 | 65.26% | ▲6.35 |
| HPU | Nablune G. Momin | 4,013 | 34.74% | ▼6.35 |
| Margin of victory | | 3,525 | 30.52% | ▲12.70 |
| Turnout | | 11,551 | 77.47% | ▼4.22 |
| Registered electors | | 15,394 | | ▲23.66 |
| INC hold | | Swing | | |

=== Assembly Election 1988 ===
1988 Meghalaya Legislative Assembly election: Resubelpara
| Party | Candidate | Votes | % | ±% |
|---|---|---|---|---|
| INC | Salseng C. Marak | 5,812 | 58.91% | ▼2.50 |
| HPU | Timothy Shira | 4,054 | 41.09% | New |
| Margin of victory | | 1,758 | 17.82% | ▼5.00 |
| Turnout | | 9,866 | 82.07% | ▲9.04 |
| Registered electors | | 12,449 | | ▲26.23 |
| INC hold | | Swing | | |

=== Assembly Election 1983 ===
1983 Meghalaya Legislative Assembly election: Resubelpara
| Party | Candidate | Votes | % | ±% |
|---|---|---|---|---|
| INC | Salseng C. Marak | 4,252 | 61.41% | ▲0.84 |
| Independent | Nablune G. Momin | 2,672 | 38.59% | New |
| Margin of victory | | 1,580 | 22.82% | ▲1.69 |
| Turnout | | 6,924 | 74.82% | ▲13.43 |
| Registered electors | | 9,862 | | ▲30.90 |
| INC hold | | Swing | | |

=== Assembly Election 1978 ===
1978 Meghalaya Legislative Assembly election: Resubelpara
| Party | Candidate | Votes | % | ±% |
|---|---|---|---|---|
| INC | Salseng C. Marak | 2,591 | 60.57% | New |
| APHLC | Timothy Shira | 1,687 | 39.43% | ▼42.38 |
| Margin of victory | | 904 | 21.13% | ▼42.49 |
| Turnout | | 4,278 | 62.42% | ▲32.16 |
| Registered electors | | 7,534 | | ▲12.08 |
| INC gain from APHLC | | Swing | ▼21.25 | |

=== Assembly Election 1972 ===
1972 Meghalaya Legislative Assembly election: Resubelpara
| Party | Candidate | Votes | % | ±% |
|---|---|---|---|---|
| APHLC | Salseng C. Marak | 1,354 | 81.81% | New |
| Independent | Polycarp James Marak | 301 | 18.19% | New |
| Margin of victory | | 1,053 | 63.63% | |
| Turnout | | 1,655 | 26.35% | |
| Registered electors | | 6,722 | | |
| APHLC win (new seat) | | | | |

== See also ==
- List of constituencies of the Meghalaya Legislative Assembly
- North Garo Hills district
