= Siju Assembly constituency =

Constituency of the Meghalaya legislative assembly in India

Siju
- Former constituency for the Meghalaya Legislative Assembly

Constituency details
- Country: India
- Region: Northeast India
- State: Meghalaya
- Established: 1972
- Abolished: 1977
- Total electors: 5,499

Siju Assembly constituency was an assembly constituency in the India state of Meghalaya.

== Members of the Legislative Assembly ==
Election	Member	Party
1972	Williamson Sangma	All Party Hill Leaders Conference

== Election results ==
=== Assembly Election 1972 ===
1972 Meghalaya Legislative Assembly election: Siju
Party	Candidate	Votes	%	±%
AHL	Williamson Sangma	Unopposed		
Registered electors		5,499		
AHL win (new seat)				
