= Dambuk Aga Assembly constituency =

Constituency of the Meghalaya legislative assembly in India

Dambuk Aga
- Former constituency for the Meghalaya Legislative Assembly

Constituency details
- Country: India
- Region: Northeast India
- State: Meghalaya
- Established: 1972
- Abolished: 1977
- Total electors: 6,297

Dambuk Aga Assembly constituency was an assembly constituency in the India state of Meghalaya .

== Members of the Legislative Assembly ==
Election	Member	Party
1972	Brojendra Sangma	All Party Hill Leaders Conference

== Election results ==
=== Assembly Election 1972 ===
1972 Meghalaya Legislative Assembly election: Dambuk Aga
Party	Candidate	Votes	%	±%
AHL	Brojendra Sangma	1,871	85.59%	New
Independent	Vitus Sangma	218	9.97%	New
Independent	Morison Daring	97	4.44%	New
Margin of victory		1,653	75.62%	
Turnout		2,186	36.22%	
Registered electors		6,297		
AHL win (new seat)				
