= Umroi Assembly constituency =

Legislative Assembly constituency in Meghalaya State, India

Coordinates: 25.74°N 91.89°E

Umroi
- Constituency No. 12 for the Meghalaya Legislative Assembly

Constituency details
- Country: India
- Region: Northeast India
- State: Meghalaya
- District: Ri Bhoi
- Lok Sabha constituency: Shillong
- Established: 2003
- Total electors: 32,602
- Reservation: ST

Member of Legislative Assembly
- 11th Meghalaya Legislative Assembly
- Incumbent Damanbait Lamare
- Party: NPP
- Alliance: NDA
- Elected year: 2023

Umroi is one of the 60 Legislative Assembly constituencies of Meghalaya state in India. It is part of Ri Bhoi district and is reserved for candidates belonging to the Scheduled Tribes. As of 2023, it is represented by Damanbait Lamare of the National People's Party.

== Members of the Legislative Assembly ==
Election	Member	Party
1972	Dlosingh Lyngdoh	Indian National Congress
1978	E. K. Mawlong	Independent politician
1983	E. K. Mawlong	Hill State People's Democratic Party
1988	E. K. Mawlong	Hill State People's Democratic Party
1993	E. K. Mawlong	Hill State People's Democratic Party
1998	E. K. Mawlong	United Democratic Party
2003	Stanlywiss Rymbai	Indian National Congress
2008	E. K. Mawlong	United Democratic Party
2013	Ngaitlang Dhar	Indian National Congress
2018	George Bankyntiewlang Lyngdoh	Indian National Congress
2023	Damanbait Lamare	National People's Party

== Election results ==
=== Assembly Election 2023 ===
2023 Meghalaya Legislative Assembly election: Umroi
Party	Candidate	Votes	%	±%
NPP	Damanbait Lamare	14,213	50.15%	▲10.00
AITC	George Bankyntiewlang Lyngdoh	12,527	44.20%	New
INC	Stanlywiss Rymbai	1,081	3.81%	▼40.68
BJP	Shanbor Ramde	404	1.43%	▲0.27
NOTA	None of the Above	197	0.70%	▲0.08
Margin of victory		1,686	5.95%	▲1.59
Turnout		28,343	86.94%	▼1.10
Registered electors		32,602		▲22.74
NPP gain from INC		Swing	▲5.65	

=== Assembly Election 2018 ===
2018 Meghalaya Legislative Assembly election: Umroi
Party	Candidate	Votes	%	±%
INC	George Bankyntiewlang Lyngdoh	10,405	44.50%	▼6.73
NPP	Ngaitlang Dhar	9,387	40.14%	New
UDP	Mangkara Pathaw	2,255	9.64%	▼7.30
PDF	Arbinus Lyngdoh	647	2.77%	New
BJP	Field Marshal Mawphniang	271	1.16%	New
NOTA	None of the Above	144	0.62%	New
Margin of victory		1,018	4.35%	▼17.99
Turnout		23,383	88.03%	▼2.74
Registered electors		26,562		▲30.16
INC hold		Swing	▼6.73	

=== Assembly Election 2013 ===
2013 Meghalaya Legislative Assembly election: Umroi
Party	Candidate	Votes	%	±%
INC	Ngaitlang Dhar	9,489	51.23%	▲11.92
Independent	Stanlywiss Rymbai	5,351	28.89%	New
UDP	Tirot Singh Sun	3,139	16.95%	▼26.45
NCP	Mording Darphang	277	1.50%	▼1.37
Independent	Aris Lyngdoh	206	1.11%	New
HSPDP	Markus Lyngdoh	61	0.33%	New
Margin of victory		4,138	22.34%	▲18.24
Turnout		18,523	90.77%	▼0.36
Registered electors		20,407		▼21.07
INC gain from UDP		Swing	▲7.83	

=== Assembly Election 2008 ===
2008 Meghalaya Legislative Assembly election: Umroi
Party	Candidate	Votes	%	±%
UDP	E. K. Mawlong	10,226	43.40%	▼3.10
INC	Stanlywiss Rymbai	9,261	39.30%	▼14.20
KHNAM	E. K. Syiem Sutnga	2,032	8.62%	New
MDP	Denington Marbaniang	772	3.28%	New
NCP	Mording Darphang	674	2.86%	New
BJP	Duruth Majaw	399	1.69%	New
LJP	Hopingstone Masharing	198	0.84%	New
Margin of victory		965	4.10%	▼2.91
Turnout		23,562	91.13%	▲28.19
Registered electors		25,855		▲4.25
UDP gain from INC		Swing	▼10.10	

=== Assembly Election 2003 ===
2003 Meghalaya Legislative Assembly election: Umroi
Party	Candidate	Votes	%	±%
INC	Stanlywiss Rymbai	8,352	53.50%	▲46.91
UDP	E. K. Mawlong	7,259	46.50%	▼4.07
Margin of victory		1,093	7.00%	▼11.08
Turnout		15,611	63.01%	▼10.42
Registered electors		24,802		▲6.91
INC gain from UDP		Swing		

=== Assembly Election 1998 ===
1998 Meghalaya Legislative Assembly election: Umroi
Party	Candidate	Votes	%	±%
UDP	E. K. Mawlong	8,607	50.57%	New
PDM	Stanly Wiss Rymbai	5,529	32.49%	New
HSPDP	Longsing Bey	1,762	10.35%	▼37.94
INC	K. N. Robert	1,121	6.59%	▼36.33
Margin of victory		3,078	18.09%	▲12.71
Turnout		17,019	75.83%	▼9.74
Registered electors		23,199		▲16.98
UDP gain from HSPDP		Swing	▲2.28	

=== Assembly Election 1993 ===
1993 Meghalaya Legislative Assembly election: Umroi
Party	Candidate	Votes	%	±%
HSPDP	E. K. Mawlong	7,958	48.29%	▼9.44
INC	Fleming Lapang	7,072	42.92%	▲0.65
AHL(AM)	Erwin K. S. Sutnga	926	5.62%	New
MPPP	K. N. Robert	214	1.30%	New
Independent	Giri Roy Phangcho	163	0.99%	New
BJP	S. Shadap	146	0.89%	New
Margin of victory		886	5.38%	▼10.10
Turnout		16,479	84.95%	▲9.97
Registered electors		19,831		▲32.06
HSPDP hold		Swing	▼9.44	

=== Assembly Election 1988 ===
1988 Meghalaya Legislative Assembly election: Umroi
Party	Candidate	Votes	%	±%
HSPDP	E. K. Mawlong	6,340	57.74%	▲11.67
INC	Fleming Stone Lapang	4,641	42.26%	▲13.40
Margin of victory		1,699	15.47%	▼1.73
Turnout		10,981	77.93%	▲5.24
Registered electors		15,017		▲28.83
HSPDP hold		Swing		

=== Assembly Election 1983 ===
1983 Meghalaya Legislative Assembly election: Umroi
Party	Candidate	Votes	%	±%
HSPDP	E. K. Mawlong	3,645	46.07%	▲19.02
INC	Ialamdhrang Masharing	2,284	28.87%	New
APHLC	Dlosingh Lyngdoh	1,238	15.65%	▼9.84
Independent	Brightstarwell Suting	499	6.31%	New
PDC	Markus Lyngdon	219	2.77%	New
Independent	R.Jespriter Shullai	27	0.34%	New
Margin of victory		1,361	17.20%	▲9.48
Turnout		7,912	72.87%	▼2.17
Registered electors		11,656		▲12.38
HSPDP gain from Independent		Swing	▲11.30	

=== Assembly Election 1978 ===
1978 Meghalaya Legislative Assembly election: Umroi
Party	Candidate	Votes	%	±%
Independent	E. K. Mawlong	2,526	34.77%	New
HSPDP	Dlosingh Lyngdoh	1,965	27.05%	New
APHLC	Fleming Stone Lapang	1,852	25.49%	New
Independent	Bnein Bareh	579	7.97%	New
Independent	Event Rapsang	125	1.72%	New
CPI	Dalington Dympep	101	1.39%	New
Independent	Festowell Giri	83	1.14%	New
Margin of victory		561	7.72%	▲6.40
Turnout		7,265	72.03%	▲17.41
Registered electors		10,372		▲44.12
Independent gain from INC		Swing	▲10.80	

=== Assembly Election 1972 ===
1972 Meghalaya Legislative Assembly election: Umroi
Party	Candidate	Votes	%	±%
INC	Dlosingh Lyngdoh	908	23.97%	New
Independent	E. K. Mawlong	858	22.65%	New
Independent	Medras Mylliem	829	21.88%	New
Independent	Daswell Lapang	701	18.51%	New
Independent	Sing Shullai	386	10.19%	New
Independent	Motilal Diengdoh	106	2.80%	New
Margin of victory		50	1.32%	
Turnout		3,788	54.72%	
Registered electors		7,197		
INC win (new seat)				

== See also ==
- List of constituencies of the Meghalaya Legislative Assembly
- Ri Bhoi district
