= Malki Assembly constituency =

Constituency of the Meghalaya legislative assembly in India

Malki
- Former constituency for the Meghalaya Legislative Assembly

Constituency details
- Country: India
- Region: Northeast India
- State: Meghalaya
- Established: 1972
- Abolished: 1977
- Total electors: 6,211

Malki Assembly constituency was an assembly constituency in the India state of Meghalaya.

== Members of the Legislative Assembly ==
Election	Member	Party
1972	Upstar Kharbuli	Independent politician

== Election results ==
=== Assembly Election 1972 ===
1972 Meghalaya Legislative Assembly election: Malki
Party	Candidate	Votes	%	±%
Independent	Upstar Kharbuli	2,346	58.04%	New
CPI	Binoy Lahiri	715	17.69%	New
Independent	Kiran Pal Choudhury	513	12.69%	New
Independent	George Hamilton	238	5.89%	New
Independent	Deva Kamal Bhuyan	230	5.69%	New
Margin of victory		1,631	40.35%	
Turnout		4,042	66.77%	
Registered electors		6,211		
Independent win (new seat)				
