= Nongkhlaw Assembly constituency =

Constituency of the Meghalaya legislative assembly in India

Nongkhlaw
- Former constituency for the Meghalaya Legislative Assembly

Constituency details
- Country: India
- Region: Northeast India
- State: Meghalaya
- Established: 1972
- Abolished: 1977
- Total electors: 7,051

Nongkhlaw Assembly constituency was an assembly constituency in the India state of Meghalaya.

== Members of the Legislative Assembly ==
Election	Member	Party
1972	Hoover Hynniewta	Independent politician

== Election results ==
=== Assembly Election 1972 ===
1972 Meghalaya Legislative Assembly election: Nongkhlaw
Party	Candidate	Votes	%	±%
Independent	Hoover Hynniewta	1,077	40.98%	New
AHL	Snomick Kalwing	1,047	39.84%	New
Independent	Osca Awahlang	504	19.18%	New
Margin of victory		30	1.14%	
Turnout		2,628	39.24%	
Registered electors		7,051		
Independent win (new seat)				
