= Raksamgre Assembly constituency =

Legislative Assembly constituency in Meghalaya State, India

Coordinates: 25.91°N 90.3°E

Raksamgre
- Constituency No. 44 for the Meghalaya Legislative Assembly

Constituency details
- Country: India
- Region: Northeast India
- State: Meghalaya
- District: West Garo Hills
- Lok Sabha constituency: Tura
- Established: 2008
- Total electors: 31,175
- Reservation: ST

Member of Legislative Assembly
- 11th Meghalaya Legislative Assembly
- Incumbent Limison D. Sangma
- Party: NPP
- Alliance: NDA
- Elected year: 2023

Raksamgre is one of the 60 Legislative Assembly constituencies of Meghalaya state in India. It is part of West Garo Hills district and is reserved for candidates belonging to the Scheduled Tribes. It was created after the passing of the Delimitation of Parliamentary and Assembly constituencies, 2008 and had its first election in 2013. As of 2023, it is represented by Limison D. Sangma of the National People's Party.

== Members of the Legislative Assembly ==
Election	Name	Party
2013	Limison D. Sangma	Indian National Congress
2018	Benedic Marak	National People's Party
2023	Limison D. Sangma	National People's Party

== Election results ==
=== Assembly Election 2023 ===
2023 Meghalaya Legislative Assembly election: Raksamgre
Party	Candidate	Votes	%	±%
NPP	Limison D. Sangma	12,184	44.36%	▲6.68
BJP	Benedic Marak	9,366	34.10%	▲23.01
AITC	Dr. Prabir D. Sangma	4,075	14.84%	New
INC	Frederick D. Sangma	1,413	5.14%	▼29.96
UDP	Sushil Gayary	261	0.95%	▼0.91
RPI(A)	Thosengcheba A. Sangma	168	0.61%	New
NOTA	None of the Above	186	0.68%	▼0.91
Margin of victory		2,818	10.26%	▲7.68
Turnout		27,467	88.11%	▼2.49
Registered electors		31,175		▲16.90
NPP hold		Swing	▲6.68	

=== Assembly Election 2018 ===
2018 Meghalaya Legislative Assembly election: Raksamgre
Party	Candidate	Votes	%	±%
NPP	Benedic Marak	9,104	37.68%	▲18.32
INC	Limison D. Sangma	8,480	35.10%	▲5.51
Independent	Edmund K. Sangma	2,909	12.04%	New
BJP	Janatan Rabha	2,679	11.09%	▲4.20
UDP	Pillarson G. Momin	449	1.86%	New
NOTA	None of the Above	383	1.59%	New
Margin of victory		624	2.58%	▼2.86
Turnout		24,159	90.60%	▲0.28
Registered electors		26,667		▲23.70
NPP gain from INC		Swing	▲8.10	

=== Assembly Election 2013 ===
2013 Meghalaya Legislative Assembly election: Raksamgre
Party	Candidate	Votes	%	±%
INC	Limison D. Sangma	5,761	29.59%	New
Independent	Edmund K Sangma	4,701	24.14%	New
NPP	Ringnon R. Marak	3,771	19.37%	New
SP	Augustine D. Marak	2,153	11.06%	New
NCP	Janatan Rabha	1,743	8.95%	New
BJP	Pillarson G. Momin	1,342	6.89%	New
Margin of victory		1,060	5.44%	
Turnout		19,471	90.32%	
Registered electors		21,558		
INC win (new seat)				

== See also ==
- List of constituencies of the Meghalaya Legislative Assembly
- West Garo Hills district
