= Michael T. Sangma =

Indian politician (died 2019)

MLA of Tikrikilla
- In office 2013–2018
- Preceded by: Limison Sangma
- Succeeded by: Jimmy D. Sangma

Personal details
- Born: 1977/78
- Died: 13 August 2019
- Party: Independent

Michael T. Sangma was an Indian politician. He was elected as a member of the Meghalaya Legislative Assembly from Tikrikilla in 2013. He died of a heart attack on 13 August 2019 at the age of 41.
