= Damanbait Lamare =

Indian politician

Damanbait Lamare (born 1997) is an Indian politician from Meghalaya. He is a member of the Meghalaya Legislative Assembly from Umroi Assembly constituency, which is reserved for Scheduled Tribe community, in Ri Bhoi district. He was first elected in the 2023 Meghalaya Legislative Assembly election representing the National People's Party.

== Early life and education ==
Lamare is from Umroi, Ri Bhoi district, Meghalaya. He is the son of Ngaitlang Dhar, a former MLA and one of the richest candidates who contested from Umroi. He studied Class 10 at Pestle Weed College, Oak Hill Estate, Dehradun, Uttarakhand, and passed the examinations conducted by the Secondary School Examinations Council in 2013.

== Career ==
Lamare won the Umroi Assembly constituency representing the National People's Party in the 2023 Meghalaya Legislative Assembly election. He polled 14,213 votes and defeated his nearest rival, George B. Lyngdoh of the All India Trinamool Congress, by a margin of 1,686 votes.
