= Mawsynram Assembly constituency =

Legislative Assembly constituency in Meghalaya State, India

Coordinates: 25.3°N 91.58°E

Mawsynram
- Constituency No. 24 for the Meghalaya Legislative Assembly

Constituency details
- Country: India
- Region: Northeast India
- State: Meghalaya
- District: East Khasi Hills
- Lok Sabha constituency: Shillong
- Established: 1972
- Total electors: 37,188
- Reservation: ST

Member of Legislative Assembly
- 11th Meghalaya Legislative Assembly
- Incumbent Ollan Singh Suin
- Party: BJP
- Alliance: NDA
- Elected year: 2023

Mawsynram is one of the 60 Legislative Assembly constituencies of Meghalaya state in India.

It is part of East Khasi Hills district and is reserved for candidates belonging to the Scheduled Tribes.

== Members of the Legislative Assembly ==
Election	Name	Party
1972	Kisto M Roy Marabaniang	All Party Hill Leaders Conference
1978	Karadoklie E. Tariang	Hill State People's Democratic Party
1983	Mestonnath Kharshandy	Indian National Congress
1988	Mestonnath Kharchandy	Indian National Congress
1993	Mestonnath Kharchandy	Indian National Congress
1998	D. Plaslanding Iangjuh	United Democratic Party
2003	D. Plaslanding Iangjuh	Meghalaya Democratic Party
2008	Pynshngainlang Syiem	Indian National Congress
2013	Pynshngainlang Syiem	Indian National Congress
2018	Himalaya Muktan Shangpliang	Indian National Congress
2023	Ollan Singh Suin (Note: Elected as United Democratic Party. Switched to BJP in Sept 2026)	United Democratic Party

== Election results ==
=== Assembly Election 2023 ===
2023 Meghalaya Legislative Assembly election: Mawsynram
Party	Candidate	Votes	%	±%
UDP	Ollan Singh Suin	10,987	33.42%	▲14.86
BJP	Himalaya Muktan Shangpliang	10,032	30.52%	▲16.29
NPP	Alvin Khyriem Sawkmie	10,002	30.43%	▲26.76
INC	Gopal Stone Hynniewta	1,056	3.21%	▼27.98
AITC	Vincent T Sangma	689	2.10%	New
NOTA	None of the Above	191	0.58%	▲0.01
Margin of victory		955	2.91%	▲0.15
Turnout		32,871	88.39%	▼2.27
Registered electors		37,188		▲17.04
UDP gain from INC		Swing	▲2.24	

=== Assembly Election 2018 ===
2018 Meghalaya Legislative Assembly election: Mawsynram
Party	Candidate	Votes	%	±%
INC	Himalaya Muktan Shangpliang	8,984	31.19%	▲0.86
PDF	Pynshngainlang Syiem	8,190	28.43%	New
UDP	Ollan Singh Suin	5,348	18.57%	▼9.53
BJP	Khrawkupar Jyrwa	4,098	14.23%	New
NPP	Laplu Sangma	1,057	3.67%	▼10.05
Independent	Silvestar Marwein	634	2.20%	New
NCP	Starfing Jove Langpen Pdahkasiej	87	0.30%	▼7.31
NOTA	None of the Above	164	0.57%	New
Margin of victory		794	2.76%	▲0.53
Turnout		28,805	90.66%	▲1.25
Registered electors		31,773		▲24.46
INC hold		Swing	▲0.86	

=== Assembly Election 2013 ===
2013 Meghalaya Legislative Assembly election: Mawsynram
Party	Candidate	Votes	%	±%
INC	Pynshngainlang Syiem	6,923	30.33%	▼0.04
UDP	Khrawkupar Jyrwa	6,414	28.10%	▲0.97
Independent	Suly Lyngdoh	4,479	19.62%	New
NPP	D. Plaslanding Iangjuh	3,131	13.72%	New
NCP	Tobias R. Marak	1,737	7.61%	▼21.15
HSPDP	Starfing Jove Langpen Pdahkasiej	141	0.62%	New
Margin of victory		509	2.23%	▲0.62
Turnout		22,825	89.41%	▼1.76
Registered electors		25,529		▲45.48
INC hold		Swing	▼0.04	

=== Assembly Election 2008 ===
2008 Meghalaya Legislative Assembly election: Mawsynram
Party	Candidate	Votes	%	±%
INC	Pynshngainlang Syiem	4,859	30.37%	▼5.07
NCP	Khrawkupar Jyrwa	4,601	28.76%	▲24.95
UDP	D. Plaslanding Iangjuh	4,340	27.13%	New
BJP	I. Rockfeller Rangdkhew	1,040	6.50%	New
Independent	Aloysius Arengh	671	4.19%	New
MDP	Blassius Kharsyntiew	284	1.78%	▼39.39
Independent	Starfing Love Langpen Pdahkasiej	204	1.28%	New
Margin of victory		258	1.61%	▼4.11
Turnout		15,999	91.17%	▲22.80
Registered electors		17,548		▼9.66
INC gain from MDP		Swing	▼10.79	

=== Assembly Election 2003 ===
2003 Meghalaya Legislative Assembly election: Mawsynram
Party	Candidate	Votes	%	±%
MDP	D. Plaslanding Iangjuh	5,467	41.16%	New
INC	Gopal Stone Hynniewta	4,707	35.44%	▲15.41
Independent	E. Wallence Basterfield Jyrwa	1,030	7.76%	New
KHNAM	I. Rockfeller Rangdkhew	1,001	7.54%	New
SAP	Sumis Marak	570	4.29%	New
NCP	Mestonnath Kharchandy	506	3.81%	New
Margin of victory		760	5.72%	▼10.04
Turnout		13,281	70.46%	▼4.09
Registered electors		19,425		▲12.15
MDP gain from UDP		Swing	▲5.37	

=== Assembly Election 1998 ===
1998 Meghalaya Legislative Assembly election: Mawsynram
Party	Candidate	Votes	%	±%
UDP	D. Plaslanding Iangjuh	4,492	35.79%	New
INC	Mestonnath Kharchandy	2,514	20.03%	▼14.32
Independent	Sumis Marak	2,239	17.84%	New
Hindu Samaj Party	E. Wallence Basterfield Jyrwa	1,207	9.62%	New
PDM	Pynshngainlang Syiem	1,093	8.71%	New
Independent	Jahannara B. Kharbhih	465	3.70%	New
RJD	Starfingjove Langpen Poahkasiej	341	2.72%	New
Margin of victory		1,978	15.76%	▲14.27
Turnout		12,551	74.72%	▼4.25
Registered electors		17,320		▲5.39
UDP gain from INC		Swing	▲1.44	

=== Assembly Election 1993 ===
1993 Meghalaya Legislative Assembly election: Mawsynram
Party	Candidate	Votes	%	±%
INC	Mestonnath Kharchandy	4,331	34.35%	▼5.94
Independent	D. Plaslanding Iangjuh	4,143	32.86%	New
HSPDP	E. Wallence Baster Field Jyrwa	1,997	15.84%	▲0.99
AHL(AM)	Dlingklingson Roy Wanninang	1,649	13.08%	New
Independent	G. W. Girod	487	3.86%	New
Margin of victory		188	1.49%	▼7.02
Turnout		12,607	78.78%	▲4.01
Registered electors		16,434		▲22.38
INC hold		Swing	▼5.94	

=== Assembly Election 1988 ===
1988 Meghalaya Legislative Assembly election: Mawsynram
Party	Candidate	Votes	%	±%
INC	Mestonnath Kharchandy	3,934	40.29%	▲8.44
HPU	D. Plaslanding Iangjuh	3,103	31.78%	New
HSPDP	E. Wallence Basterfield Jyrwa	1,450	14.85%	▼11.54
Independent	Illipson Jyawa	640	6.56%	New
PDC	Karadoklie E. Tariang	636	6.51%	▲1.88
Margin of victory		831	8.51%	▲3.05
Turnout		9,763	75.23%	▲3.71
Registered electors		13,429		▲23.12
INC hold		Swing	▲8.44	

=== Assembly Election 1983 ===
1983 Meghalaya Legislative Assembly election: Mawsynram
Party	Candidate	Votes	%	±%
INC	Mestonnath Kharshandy	2,397	31.85%	▲14.81
HSPDP	D. Plaslanding Iangjuh	1,986	26.39%	▲2.35
Independent	S. B. Roy Snaitang	779	10.35%	New
APHLC	B. Werson Giri	699	9.29%	▼8.79
Independent	E. Wallence Basterfield Jyrwa	597	7.93%	New
Independent	K. M. Roy Marbainiang	458	6.09%	New
PDC	Leonis John Richard Lyngkhoi	349	4.64%	New
Margin of victory		411	5.46%	▲0.50
Turnout		7,525	73.69%	▼1.11
Registered electors		10,907		▲15.74
INC gain from HSPDP		Swing	▲7.82	

=== Assembly Election 1978 ===
1978 Meghalaya Legislative Assembly election: Mawsynram
Party	Candidate	Votes	%	±%
HSPDP	Karadoklie E. Tariang	1,588	24.04%	New
Independent	D. Plaslanding Iangjuh	1,260	19.07%	New
APHLC	K. M. Roy Marbainiang	1,194	18.07%	▼14.93
Independent	Mestonnath Kharchandy	1,174	17.77%	New
INC	B. W. Giri	1,126	17.05%	New
Independent	Bington Gidon	105	1.59%	New
Independent	J. Natep	82	1.24%	New
Margin of victory		328	4.97%	▼1.21
Turnout		6,606	72.89%	▲6.58
Registered electors		9,424		▲14.12
HSPDP gain from APHLC		Swing	▼8.96	

=== Assembly Election 1972 ===
1972 Meghalaya Legislative Assembly election: Mawsynram
Party	Candidate	Votes	%	±%
APHLC	Kisto M Roy Marabaniang	1,731	33.00%	New
Independent	Mestonnath Kharchandy	1,407	26.83%	New
Independent	Lionis John Richard	1,336	25.47%	New
Independent	Parangbonsen T. Marwein	490	9.34%	New
Independent	Kredik Thongni	155	2.96%	New
Independent	Trespiwl Roy Skhemiew	126	2.40%	New
Margin of victory		324	6.18%	
Turnout		5,245	65.89%	
Registered electors		8,258		
APHLC win (new seat)				

== See also ==
- List of constituencies of the Meghalaya Legislative Assembly
- East Khasi Hills district
