= Donkupar Roy ministry =

Cabinet of Meghalaya (2008–2009)

- 20th Ministry of Meghalaya
- Date formed: 19 March 2008
- Date dissolved: 19 March 2009

People and organisations
- Governor: Shivinder Singh Sidhu (until 30 June 2008); Ranjit Shekhar Mooshahary (from 1 July 2008)
- Chief Minister: Donkupar Roy
- Deputy Chief Ministers: Hopingstone Lyngdoh; Timothy Shira
- No. of ministers: 12
- Member parties: United Democratic Party (3); Nationalist Congress Party (3); Hill State People's Democratic Party (2); Khun Hynniewtrep National Awakening Movement (1); Bharatiya Janata Party (1); Independents (2)
- Status in legislature: Coalition
- Opposition party: Indian National Congress
- Opposition leader: D. D. Lapang

History
- Election: 2008
- Outgoing election: 2013
- Legislature term: 5 years
- Predecessor: Fourth Lapang ministry
- Successor: Fifth Lapang ministry

The Donkupar Roy ministry was the 20th council of ministers of the Indian state of Meghalaya headed by Chief Minister Donkupar Roy. The ministry was formed on 19 March 2008 with the appointment of chief minister Roy of the United Democratic Party who formed a coalition government along with several other parties following the state election which resulted in a hung-assembly. The ministry remained in office until the chief minister's resignation a year later, on 19 March 2009 following his defeat in a vote of no-confidence.

== History ==
The state assembly election held in March 2008 resulted in no single political party securing a majority. The ruling Indian National Congress emerged as the single-largest party with 25 seats followed by the Nationalist Congress Party with 14 seats and the United Democratic Party with 11 seats. Governor Shivinder Singh Sidhu re-appointed D. D. Lapang as the chief minister despite the Congress not having a majority in the legislature.

However, on 18 March 2008, ahead of a vote of no-confidence in the legislature, Lapang chose to resign. He was replaced by Donkupar Roy of the United Democratic Party who formed the Meghalaya Progressive Alliance coalition along with the other non-Congress parties and formed the government. He was sworn in into office the following day.

== Cabinet formation ==
The Meghalaya Progressive Alliance government consisted of five parties and two independents. The parties included the United Democratic Party, the Nationalist Congress Party, the Hill State People's Democratic Party, the Khun Hynniewtrep National Awakening Movement, and the Bharatiya Janata Party. Three ministers each from the United Democratic Party and the Nationalist Congress Party, two from the Hill State People's Democratic Party, one each from the Khun Hynniewtrep National Awakening Movement and the Bharatiya Janata Party, and two independent legislators were inducted into the council of ministers on 20 March 2008.

The government faced a vote of no-confidence in March 2009 after two ministers- Paul Lyngdoh and Adviser Pariong resigned from the cabinet and withdrew their support from the government. At the same time, two other independent legislators also withdrew their support from the government. This subsequently led to the government losing its majority in the legislature. Following the resignation of the chief minister, president's rule was imposed in the state.

== List of ministers ==
Cabinet
Portfolio	Minister	Took office	Left office	Party
Chief Minister and also incharge of: Department of Planning; Department of Personnel; All other departments not assigned to any other Minister.	Donkupar Roy	19 March 2008	19 March 2009	UDP
Deputy Chief Minister and; Minister of Home (Police); Minister of Public Works Development (Roads)	Hopingstone Lyngdoh	20 March 2008	19 March 2009	HSPDP
Deputy Chief Minister and; Minister of Community and Rural Development; Minister of Arts and Culture; Minister of Information Technology; Minister of Printing and Stationery	Timothy Shira	20 March 2008	19 March 2009	NCP
Minister of Urban Affairs; Minister of Municipal Affairs; Minister of Sports and Youth Affairs; Minister of Parliamentary Affairs	Paul Lyngdoh	20 March 2008	12 March 2009	KHNAM
Minister of Taxation; Minister of Public Works Development (Buildings); Minister of Food and Civil Supplies; Minister of Secretariat Administration	J. Antonius Lyngdoh	20 March 2008	19 March 2009	UDP
Minister of Public Health Engineering; Minister of Home (Passport); Minister of Relief and Rehabilitation	Alexander Laloo Hek	20 March 2008	19 March 2009	BJP
Minister of Finance; Minister of Power; Minister of Housing; Minister of General Administration; Minister of Tourism	Conrad Sangma	20 March 2008	19 March 2009	NCP
Minister of Higher and Technical Education; Minister of Information and Public Relations; Minister of Stamps and Registrations	Manas Chaudhuri	20 March 2008	19 March 2009	IND
Minister of Agriculture; Minister of Minor Irrigation; Minister of Animal Husbandry and Veterinary; Minister of Revenue	E. C. Boniface Bamon	20 March 2008	19 March 2009	NCP
Minister of Social Welfare; Minister of Transport; Minister of Soil and Water Conservation; Minister of Home (Civil Defence and Home Guards)	Nimarson Momin	20 March 2008	19 March 2009	UDP
Minister of Health and Family Welfare; Minister of Horticulture; Minister of Re-organisation; Minister of Elections	Adviser Pariong	20 March 2008	12 March 2009	HSPDP
Minister of Mining and Geology; Minister of Excise; Minister of Weights and Measures; Minister of Border Trade	Don Kupar Massar	20 March 2008	19 March 2009	IND
