= Shillong Cantt Assembly constituency =

Constituency of the Meghalaya legislative assembly in India

Shillong Cantt
- Former constituency for the Meghalaya Legislative Assembly

Constituency details
- Country: India
- Region: Northeast India
- State: Meghalaya
- Established: 1972
- Abolished: 1977
- Total electors: 2,593

Shillong Cantt Assembly constituency was an assembly constituency in the India state of Meghalaya.

== Members of the Legislative Assembly ==
Election	Member	Party
1972	Dhrubanath Joshi	Indian National Congress

== Election results ==
=== Assembly Election 1972 ===
1972 Meghalaya Legislative Assembly election: Shillong Cantt
Party	Candidate	Votes	%	±%
INC	Dhrubanath Joshi	1,263	69.78%	New
Independent	Dringson E. Shalam	353	19.50%	New
Independent	Hasting Kharkongor	116	6.41%	New
Independent	Markan Lyndem	78	4.31%	New
Margin of victory		910	50.28%	
Turnout		1,810	72.93%	
Registered electors		2,593		
INC win (new seat)				
