= 2021 Garo Hills Autonomous District Council election =

Indian election in Meghalaya

- 12 April 2021

29 out of 30 seats in the Garo Hills Autonomous District Council 16 seats needed for a majority
- Turnout: 69.42% ▲

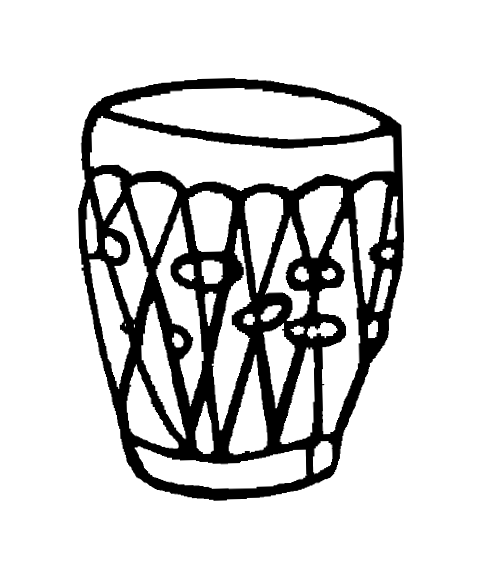
	First party	Second party	Third party
Party	INC	NPP	BJP
Last election	7	10	1
Seats won	12	11	2
Seat change	▲5	▲1	▲1
	Fourth party	Fifth party	Sixth party
	GNC
Party	GNC	NCP	UDP
Last election	3	1	0
Seats won	1	0	0
Seat change	▼2	▼1	Steady
Chief Executive Member before election
Dipul Marak
NPP
Chief Executive Member
Benedict Marak
NPP

Elections to the Garo Hills Autonomous District Council (GHADC) were held on 12 April 2021.

There were 743,000 eligible voters in the elections. The votes were counted on 15 April 2021.

== Schedule ==
Election Event	Date	Time	Day
Last date for filing nomination	15 March 2021	Before 3:00 pm	Monday
Scrutiny of nomination	15 March 2021	After 3:00 pm	Monday
Last date of withdrawal of candidature	19 March 2021		Friday
Date of polling	12 April 2021		Monday
Date of counting	15 April 2021		Thursday

== Party candidates ==
Constituency		NPP	INC	BJP	UDP	NCP
1	Siju	Albinush R Marak	Kenadik S Marak	Jon Gunchong D Shira	Salseng R Marak	
2	Wagesik	Bartholomeo D. Shira	Freedarson N Sangma		Diana N Marak	
3	Silkigre	Sengbath R Marak	Willy D Shira	Wolden Sangma	Bishal Arengh	
4	Rongrikimgre	Wenison Ch Marak	Dipur Sangma	Heringstone Marak	Jadush M Sangma	Predith Ch Sangma
5	Gasuapara	Sengchim N Sangma	Olendro R Marak	Lahin Marak	Devier M Sangma	
6	Barengapara	Nasser R. Marak	Sarbha R Marak	Pramod Koch	Deepak Sangma	
7	Babelapara	Rakesh A. Sangma	James Sangma	Righteous N Sangma		Saleng A Sangma
8	Amongpara	Panseng R. Marak	Nehru D Sangma			Dalseng Bira Ch Momin
9	Tura	Semford B Sangma	Kunal Ch Momin	Bernard Marak		
10	Dengnakpara	Sanjip T Sangma	Sadhiya Rani M Sangma	Daniel M Sangma	Kredithson Ch Marak	
11	Boldamgre	Thebalsongh Arengh	Stevie M Marak	Huberth N Arengh	Hellwithson A Sangma	
12	Nogorpara	Linekar K Sangma	Kansan Sangma	Boston Marak	Mijon Marak	
13	Zikzak	Premananda Koch	Jagdish Ch Hazong	Bhupender Hazong		
14	Betasing	Premish Sangma	Sanjay Koch	Babul Ch Hajong		
15	Rochonpara	Dipul R. Marak	Malcolm M Sangma	Jeberth Sangma		
16	Asanang	Anseng A. Sangma	Adamkid M Sangma		Ajit a Marak	
17	Balachanda	Enamul Haque	Agassi R Marak	Cyril S Sangma	Cary Marak	
18	Batabari	Roynath D. Sangma	Ashahel D. Shira		Henston M Marak	
19	Shyamnagar	Tarif Ibrahim Sarkar	Habibuz Zaman	Md. Fozibur Rahman		Jellin S. Sangma
20	Raksamgre	Benedic R Marak	Joyson R. Marak			
21	Naguapara	Dhormonath Ch Sangma	Mrinal R Marak	Ranjit Rabha		
22	Jengjal	Grahambell A Sangma	Levastone T Sangma			
23	Rongrong	Sukharam K Sangma	Rinaldo K Sangma	Mamik M Sangma		
24	Bolsong	Crozier G. Momin	Manseng Momin	Domosh M Sangma	Rakman Ch Marak	Nexton Marak
25	Damas	Dolly K Sangma	Pardinand D Shira	Lakhita D Shira	Elbarth Marak	Zeercostar Momin
26	Kharkutta	Edbirth D. Shira	Cherak Watre Momin		Samarson M Marak	
27	Samandagre	Brilliant R Sangma	Lahitson M Sangma	Lopsing Marak		
28	Darugre	Henen R Sangma	Rapiush Ch Sangma		Arman Gare Momin	
29	Williamnagar	Denang T Sangma	Alphonsush R Marak	Greatwill Sangma	Arun N Marak	
	Total	29	29	21	17	6

== Results ==
The counting was held on 15 April. No party could get a clear majority. The INC emerged single largest party by winning 12 seats.

=== By Party ===
Party	Popular vote		Seats		
Party	Vote	%	Contested	Won	+/-
Indian National Congress (INC)			29	12	▲5
National People's Party (NPP)			29	11	▲1
Bharatiya Janata Party (BJP)			21	2	▲1
Garo National Council (GNC)			5	1	▼2
United Democratic Party (UDP)			17	0	Steady
Nationalist Congress Party (NCP)			6	0	▼1
Independent (IND)			78	3	▼4
None of the above (NOTA)			N/A		
Total			182	29	N/A

=== By Constituency ===
No.	Constituency	Winner	Party	Margin
1	Siju	Albinus R Marak	NPP	
2	Wagesik	Natual R Marak	IND	
3	Silkigre	Sengbath R Marak	NPP	
4	Rongrikimgre	Nikman Ch Marak	GNC	
5	Gasuapara	Sengchim N Sangma	NPP	
6	Barengapara	Pramod Koch	BJP	
7	Babelapara	Rakesh A Sangma	NPP	
8	Amongpara	Nehru D Sangma	INC	
9	Tura	Bernard N Marak	BJP	
10	Dengnakpara	Sadhia Rani	INC	
11	Boldamgre	Stevie M Marak	INC	
12	Nogorpara	Linekar K Sangma	NPP	
13	Zikzak	Aktar Ali	IND	
14	Betasing	Sanjay Koch	INC	
15	Rochonpara	Arbin Marak	IND	
16	Asanang	Anseng Sangma	NPP	
17	Balachanda	Agassi R Marak	INC	
18	Batabari	Ashahel D Shira	INC	
19	Shyamnagar	Habibuz Zaman	INC	
20	Raksamgre	Benedick R Marak	NPP	
21	Naguapara	Dhormonath Ch Sangma	NPP	
22	Jengjal	Grahambell A Sangma	NPP	
23	Rongrong	Rinaldo K Sangma	INC	
24	Bolsong	Crozier G. Momin	NPP	
25	Damas	Ferdinand Shira	INC	
26	Kharkutta	Cherak W Momin	INC	
27	Samandagre	Lahitson M Sangma	INC	
28	Darugre	Henen R Sangma	NPP	
29	Williamnagar	Alphonsush R Marak	INC	

== Executive council formation ==
The new council was formed by the NPP, with the support of three independents, two BJP and the lone GNC councillor. Benedick R Marak took oath as the CEM, whereas Nikman Ch Marak became the Deputy CEM.
