= Mynsoraliang Assembly constituency =

Constituency of the Meghalaya legislative assembly in India

Mynsoraliang
- Former constituency for the Meghalaya Legislative Assembly

Constituency details
- Country: India
- Region: Northeast India
- State: Meghalaya
- Established: 1972
- Abolished: 1977
- Total electors: 9,230

Mynsoraliang Assembly constituency was an assembly constituency in the India state of Meghalaya.

== Members of the Legislative Assembly ==
Election	Member	Party
1972	Humphrey Hadem	Independent politician

== Election results ==
=== Assembly Election 1972 ===
1972 Meghalaya Legislative Assembly election: Mynsoraliang
Party	Candidate	Votes	%	±%
Independent	Humphrey Hadem	3,636	53.18%	New
AHL	Jerueyliwin Garod	3,201	46.82%	New
Margin of victory		435	6.36%	
Turnout		6,837	75.25%	
Registered electors		9,230		
Independent win (new seat)				
