= Jimmy Sangma =

Indian politician (born 1974)

Jimmy Sangma (born 1974) is an Indian politician from Meghalaya. He is a member of the Meghalaya Legislative Assembly from the Tikrikilla Assembly constituency, which is reserved for Scheduled Tribe community, in West Garo Hills district. He won the 2023 Meghalaya Legislative Assembly election, representing the National People's Party (India).

== Early life and education ==
Sangma is from Khamari village, Hollaidanga post, Tikrikilla PS, West Garo Hills district, Meghalaya. He is the son of late Bijen M. Marak. He studied Class 12 and passed the higher secondary examinations conducted by the Meghalaya Board of School Education in 1988. He is a retired government employee and his wife is a teacher.

== Career ==
Sangma won the Tikrikilla Assembly constituency representing the National People's Party (India) in the 2023 Meghalaya Legislative Assembly election. He polled 13,218 votes and defeated his nearest rival, former chief minister and six time MLA, Mukul Sangma of the All India Trinamool Congress, by a margin of 5,313 votes. As an independent candidate, he came third behind the winner Michael T. Sangma, also an independent, and Rahinath Barchung of the Indian National Congress, in the 2013 Meghalaya Legislative Assembly election. He then won the 2018 Meghalaya Legislative Assembly election representing the Indian National Congress and defeated Barchung, who contested as an independent politician, by a margin of 1,407 votes.
