= Ollan Singh Suin =

Indian politician

Ollan Singh Suin (born 1968) is an Indian politician from Meghalaya. He is a member of the Meghalaya Legislative Assembly from the Mawsynram Assembly constituency, which is reserved for the Scheduled Tribe community, in East Khasi Hills district. He won the 2023 Meghalaya Legislative Assembly election, representing the United Democratic Party.

In September 2026, Suin was part of a major political realignment in the state, defecting from the United Democratic Party (UDP) alongside seven other legislators to merge with the Bharatiya Janata Party.

== Early life and education ==
Suin hails from Mawkynwan Lyngkhom, East Khasi Hills district, Meghalaya, the son of late Bitstobar Rynjah. He completed his B.Sc. in agriculture in 1989 at Assam Agricultural University, Jorhat. He is a retired government employee.

== Career ==
Suin was elected from the Mawsynram Assembly constituency representing the United Democratic Party in the 2023 Meghalaya Legislative Assembly election. He polled 10,987 votes and defeated his nearest rival, Himalaya Muktan Shangpliang of the Bharatiya Janata Party, by a margin of 955 votes.
