= Abu Taher Mondal =

Meghalaya politician

- আবু তাহের মণ্ডল
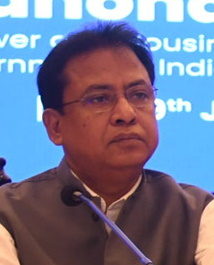

Cabinet Minister, Government of Meghalaya
- In office 7 March 2023 – 16 September 2025
- Chief Minister: Conrad Sangma
- Portfolios: Community and Rural Development; Power; Taxation
- In office 20 April 2010 – 1 March 2013
- Chief Minister: Mukul Sangma
- Portfolios: Power; Excise; Transport; Information and Public Relations
- In office 13 May 2009 – 19 April 2010
- Chief Minister: D. D. Lapang
- Portfolios: Taxation; Information Technology; Fisheries; Science and Technology; Weights and Measures
- In office 13 May 2009 – 19 April 2010
- Chief Minister: D. D. Lapang
- Portfolios: Health and Family Welfare; Secretariat Administration; Civil Defence and Home Guards

Speaker of the Meghalaya Legislative Assembly
- In office 11 March 2013 – 3 March 2018
- Preceded by: Charles Pyngrope
- Succeeded by: Donkupar Roy

Member, Meghalaya Legislative Assembly
- Incumbent
- Assumed office 2 March 2023
- Preceded by: S. G. Esmatur Mominin
- Constituency: Phulbari
- In office 2008 – 3 March 2013
- Preceded by: Manirul Islam Sarkar
- In office 1998–2003
- Preceded by: Manirul Islam Sarkar
- Succeeded by: Manirul Islam Sarkar

Personal details
- Born: 1967 (age 58–59) Phulbari, Meghalaya
- Party: National People's Party (since 2023)
- Other political affiliations: Nationalist Congress Party (2003); Indian National Congress (2013–2023)

Abu Taher Mondal (Bengali: আবু তাহের মণ্ডল) is an Indian Bengali politician, social worker and retired civil engineer. He is a four-time MLA of the Phulbari constituency in the Meghalaya Legislative Assembly.

== Early life and education ==
Mondal was born into a Bengali Muslim family in the plains region of the West Garo Hills district of Meghalaya. His father was Samsul Huda Mondal. Mondal graduated in 1991 with a Bachelor of Engineering degree. He owns land in Shyamding and Phulbari.

== Career ==
Despite being an independent candidate during the 1998 Meghalaya Legislative Assembly election, Mondal successfully beat Manirul Islam Sarkar for the Phulbari constituency. Mondal joined the Nationalist Congress Party for the 2003 Meghalaya Legislative Assembly election but was unsuccessful against Sarkar this time. During the 2008 Meghalaya Legislative Assembly election, Mondal became independent once more and beat Sarkar. He managed to keep his seat in the 2013 Meghalaya Legislative Assembly election, this time as an Indian National Congress candidate. His two-term streak was broken at the 2018 Meghalaya Legislative Assembly election by S. G. Esmatur Mominin.

In March 2013, Mondal was elected Speaker of the Legislative Assembly. He was the first "non-Indigenous" legislator to hold the office.
