= Akramozzaman =

Meghalaya politician

Alhaj Muhammad Akramozzaman

Member of Meghalaya Legislative Assembly
- In office 1972–1983
- Preceded by: Post established
- Succeeded by: Parimal Rava
- Constituency: Phulbari

Personal details
- Party: Indian National Congress

Muhammad Akramozzaman was an Indian Bengali politician. He was a former two-time member of the Meghalaya Legislative Assembly for the Phulbari constituency in West Garo Hills district.

== Life ==
Zaman was born into a Bengali Muslim family in the West Garo Hills district of Meghalaya. He is a practicing Sunni Muslim and has performed Hajj.

He was associated with the Indian National Congress party. When Meghalaya was declared an autonomous state in 1970, Zaman served as the Leader of the Opposition. He was the inaugural MLA for Phulbari constituency after winning the state's first elections and defeating independent candidate Majibhur Rahman. Zaman was a part of the 6-member Meghalaya State Planning Board (1972). He also participated in the 1978 Meghalaya Legislative Assembly election and beat his closest rival, the independent candidate Sofiar Rahman Hazarika, by only 14 votes. He was unsuccessful in the 1983 and 1993 Meghalaya Legislative Assembly elections.

According to journalist Anowar Islam, Zaman migrated to South Salmara in Assam as a result of violence in Phulbari. His son, Azizuz Zaman, is also a politician in Phulbari.
