= 1972 Meghalaya Legislative Assembly election =

State election in India

- 9 March 1972

All 60 seats in the Meghalaya Legislative Assembly 31 seats needed for a majority
	First party	Second party
	APH	INC
Party	APHLC	INC(R)
Seats won	32	9
Popular vote	73,851	20,474
Percentage	35.67	9.89
Chief Minister before election
Office established
Chief Minister
Williamson A. Sangma
APHLC

The 1972 Meghalaya Legislative Assembly election was held on 9 March 1972. These were Meghalaya's first Legislative Assembly elections, following the creation of the state on 21 January 1972. 59 men and one woman, Percylina Marak, were elected.

== Results ==
Party	Votes	%	Seats
All Party Hill Leaders Conference (AHL)	73,851	35.67	32
Indian National Congress (INC)	20,474	9.89	9
Communist Party of India (CPI)	1,182	0.57	0
Independents (IND)	111,506	53.86	19^{[a]}
Total	207,013	100.00	60
Source: Election Commission of India

^{a} The Hill State People's Democratic Party won 8 seats, but the party's representatives were recorded as independents in the official statistical report of the election.

== Elected members ==
Winner, runner-up, voter turnout, and victory margin in every constituency
Assembly Constituency		Turnout	Winner				Runner Up				Margin
#k	Names	%	Candidate	Party	Votes	%	Candidate	Party	Votes	%	Margin
1	Jowai	73.3%	B. B. Shallam	APHLC	2,907	49.14%	Gordon D. Pae	INC	1,742	29.45%	1,165
2	Nongtalang	66.%	Enowell Pohshna	Independent	2,426	38.1%	Johndeng Pohrmen	APHLC	2,328	36.56%	98
3	Rymbai	73.97%	Lewis Bareh	Independent	3,555	56.6%	Nihon Ksih	APHLC	2,726	43.4%	829
4	Sutnga	71.72%	Onward Leyswell Nongtdu	Independent	2,411	39.55%	Beryl Sutnga	APHLC	1,862	30.54%	549
5	Nartiang	75.54%	Edwingson Bareh	APHLC	3,890	50.76%	Olbin Lamare	Independent	2,937	38.32%	953
6	Mynsoraliang	75.25%	Humphrey Hadem	Independent	3,636	53.18%	Jerueyliwin Garod	APHLC	3,201	46.82%	435
7	Mawlai	64.66%	Stanlington David Khongwir	Independent	2,830	56.1%	E. Bremly Lyngdoh	APHLC	2,215	43.9%	615
8	Mawkhar	59.93%	Alexander Warjri	APHLC	1,474	33.11%	Ajra Khongphai	Independent	1,279	28.73%	195
9	Jaiaw	58.6%	P. Ripple Kyndiah	APHLC	2,489	50.7%	Ganoldmassar	Independent	2,031	41.37%	458
10	Mawprem	64.56%	Maham Singh	INC	3,202	69.67%	Jokendro Lanong	Independent	1,394	30.33%	1,808
11	Shillong Cantt	72.93%	Dhrubanath Joshi	INC	1,263	69.78%	Dringson E. Shalam	Independent	353	19.5%	910
12	Laban	56.26%	Parsvanath Choudhury	INC	1,708	41.39%	Muriel Selma Dunn	Independent	1,183	28.66%	525
13	Malki	66.77%	Upstar Kharbuli	Independent	2,346	58.04%	Binoy Lahiri	CPI	715	17.69%	1,631
14	Laitumkhrah	63.69%	Peter G. Mareaniang	APHLC	3,059	67.9%	Pranesh Chandra Biswas	Independent	1,446	32.1%	1,613
15	Nongthymmai	50.4%	Brington Buhai Lyngdoh	APHLC	1,269	31.03%	Goilas Marbaniang	Independent	1,070	26.16%	199
16	Nongkhlaw	39.24%	Hoover Hynniewta	Independent	1,077	40.98%	Snomick Kalwing	APHLC	1,047	39.84%	30
17	Nongpoh	50.76%	Dr. D. D. Lapang	Independent	1,166	30.75%	A. Alley	Independent	772	20.36%	394
18	Mawhati	52.82%	Martin Narayan Majaw	Independent	1,521	34.4%	S. R. Moksha	Independent	876	19.81%	645
19	Sohryngkham	56.97%	G. Nilliemncap	Independent	1,412	37.88%	Dlein Kharumnuid	Independent	821	22.02%	591
20	Nongkrem	54.22%	Radhon S. Lyngdoh	APHLC	2,916	82.14%	Resida Sohtun	Independent	532	14.99%	2,384
21	Dienglieng	46.38%	Beterson Kharkongor	APHLC	1,153	40.54%	Jungai Khongjoh	Independent	1,033	36.32%	120
22	Umroi	54.72%	Dlosingh Lyngdoh	INC	908	23.97%	E. K. Mawlong	Independent	858	22.65%	50
23	Mylliem	57.32%	Jor Manik Syiem	APHLC	1,921	43.97%	Francis Syiem	Independent	1,421	32.52%	500
24	Sohiong	61.84%	Edward Kurbah	Independent	1,496	33.73%	S. Lonaik Marbaniang	Independent	973	21.94%	523
25	Nongspung	46.66%	Winstone Syiemiong	Independent	1,751	59.6%	Kwing Drolin Shangdiar	APHLC	488	16.61%	1,263
26	Mairang	57.35%	Fuller Lyngdoh Mawnai	Independent	2,009	58.22%	Irad Manik Syiem	APHLC	1,207	34.98%	802
27	Pariong	64.82%	Hopingstone Lyngdoh	Independent	2,890	70.82%	Mak Uhongni	Independent	695	17.03%	2,195
28	Nongstoin	60.73%	Francis K. Mawlot	Independent	3,630	82.71%	Ledishon Nongsiang	APHLC	759	17.29%	2,871
29	Mawthengkut	53.62%	Raisen Mawsor	Independent	2,248	64.23%	Maysalin War	APHLC	1,216	34.74%	1,032
30	Langrin	50.6%	Humdhrey Nongrum	APHLC	1,597	48.59%	Balkstar Wanniang	Independent	1,480	45.03%	117
31	Mawkyrwat	59.33%	Rowell Lyngdoh	Independent	2,107	63.62%	Garland Royal	APHLC	1,027	31.01%	1,080
32	Mawsynram	65.89%	Kisto M Roy Marabaniang	APHLC	1,731	33.%	Mestonnath Kharchandy	Independent	1,407	26.83%	324
33	Shella	58.25%	Stanely D D Nochols Roy	APHLC	2,798	57.97%	Pros Erly Chandra Chyne	Independent	1,516	31.41%	1,282
34	Sohra	63.31%	S. Phaindrojen Swer	APHLC	2,210	49.06%	A Blingstodar Diengdoh	Independent	1,880	41.73%	330
35	Nongshken	51.77%	Darwin D Pugh	APHLC	2,110	51.05%	Luisa Brosila Lamin	Independent	1,463	35.4%	647
36	Langkyrdem	45.66%	Galynstone Laloo	APHLC	1,396	42.32%	Herington Mulliem	Independent	1,285	38.95%	111
37	Mahendraganj	69.72%	Shamsul Hoque	Independent	2,012	44.35%	Khelaram Barman	INC	1,434	31.61%	578
38	Dalu	52.01%	Nimosh Sangma	APHLC	1,853	67.24%	Lamberth K. Sangma	Independent	903	32.76%	950
39	Dambuk Aga	36.22%	Brojendra Sangma	APHLC	1,871	85.59%	Vitus Sangma	Independent	218	9.97%	1,653
40	Chokpot	41.36%	Jackman Marak	APHLC	1,583	71.08%	Greendash R, Marak	Independent	644	28.92%	939
41	Siju	-	Williamson Sangma	APHLC	Elected Unopposed						
42	Rongrenggiri	18.23%	Choronsing Sangma	APHLC	973	78.91%	Metrona Marak	Independent	197	15.98%	776
43	Rongjeng	33.24%	Pleander G. Momin	Independent	1,085	74.06%	Gornel Marak	APHLC	380	25.94%	705
44	Kharkutta	29.93%	Pretting Tone Sangma	APHLC	760	53.98%	Wetherson Monin	Independent	286	20.31%	474
45	Songsak	23.56%	Elwin Sangma	APHLC	819	74.93%	Projengton Momin	Independent	176	16.1%	643
46	Resubelpara	26.35%	Salseng C. Marak	APHLC	1,354	81.81%	Polycarp James Marak	Independent	301	18.19%	1,053
47	Mendipathar	48.63%	Sibendra Narayan Koch	INC	1,087	47.28%	Josendra Chrava	Independent	746	32.45%	341
48	Tikrikilla	69.38%	Monindra Rava	APHLC	2,801	59.12%	Nurali Slam	Independent	1,937	40.88%	864
49	Phulbari	69.17%	Akramozzaman	INC	2,076	53.78%	Majibhur Rahman	Independent	1,784	46.22%	292
50	Rongchugiri	27.12%	Medison A. Sangma	APHLC	729	53.52%	Arthur Momin	Independent	331	24.3%	398
51	Bajengdoba	34.22%	Grohonsing Marak	APHLC	1,531	84.21%	Broson Momin	Independent	287	15.79%	1,244
52	Dadenggre	26.55%	Reidson Momin	APHLC	928	65.58%	Bronson W. Momin	Independent	487	34.42%	441
53	Rongram	33.37%	Percylina R. Marak	APHLC	1,197	53.77%	Miriam D Shira	Independent	842	37.83%	355
54	Selsella	46.97%	William Cecil R Marak	INC	2,550	76.55%	Rosendra Hajong	CPI	467	14.02%	2,083
55	Ampatigiri	47.8%	Jagabandhu Barman	INC	1,230	37.51%	Lakhindra Hajong	Independent	1,124	34.28%	106
56	Rangsakona	47.36%	Sanford Marak	APHLC	1,534	61.14%	Jenden Ch. Marak	Independent	975	38.86%	559
57	Tura	44.25%	Singjan Sangma	INC	1,451	51.34%	Jangsan K. Sangma	Independent	969	34.29%	482
58	Kherapara	28.28%	Plansing Marak	APHLC	1,250	81.65%	Janathon Sangma	Independent	281	18.35%	969
59	Dalamgiri	-	Ira Marak	APHLC	Elected Unopposed						
60	Salmanpara	-	Samarendra Sangma	APHLC	Elected Unopposed						

== Bypolls ==
Year	Constituency	Reason for by-poll	Winning candidate	Party
1973	Mawthengkut		Raison Mawsor	Independent
