= Zenith Sangma =

Indian politician

Zenith M. Sangma
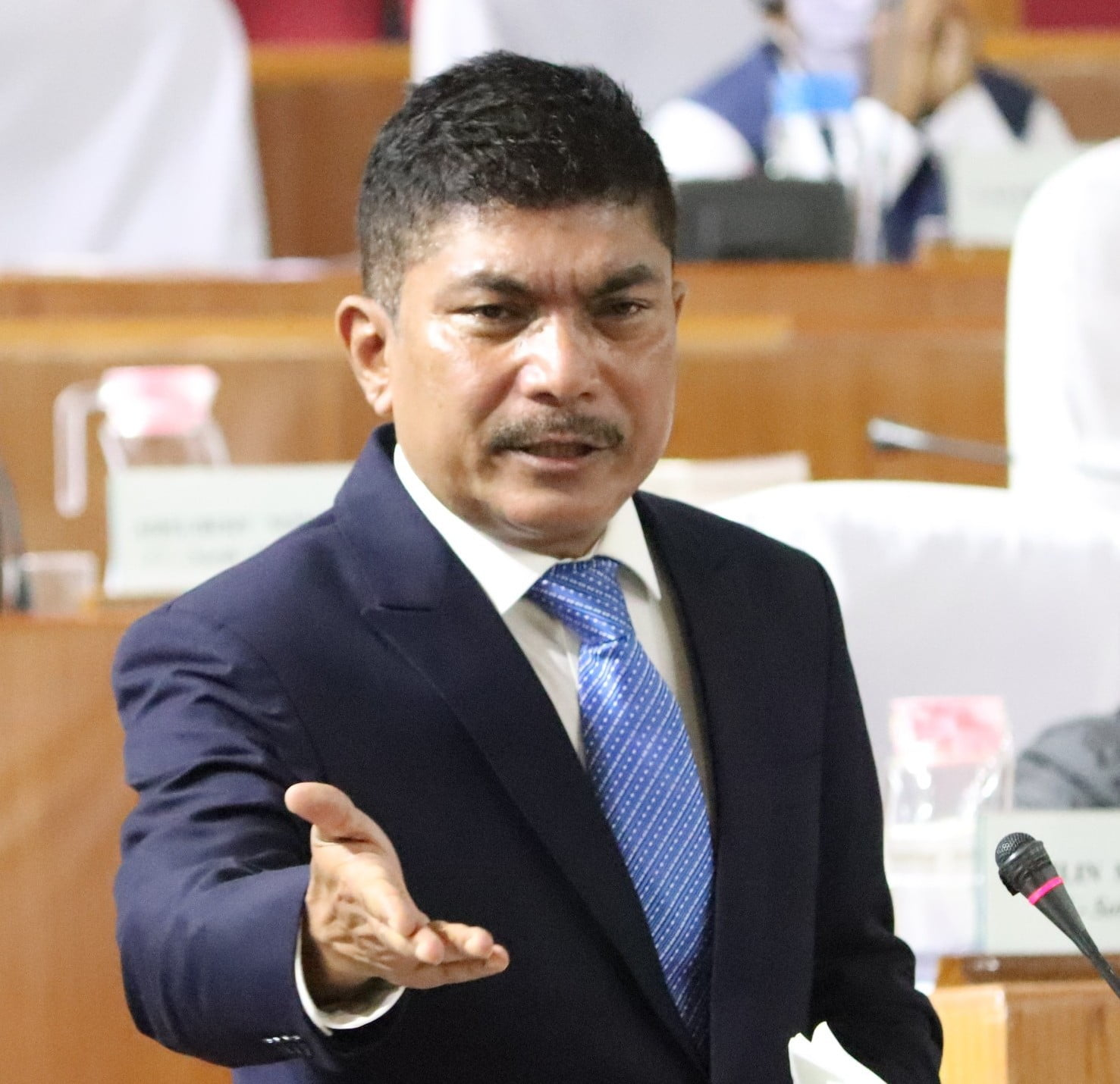

Member of the Meghalaya Legislative Assembly
- In office 2013–2023
- Preceded by: Adolf Lu Hitler R. Marak
- Constituency: Rangsakona
- In office 2003–2008
- Preceded by: Adolf Lu Hitler R. Marak
- Succeeded by: Adolf Lu Hitler R. Marak

Personal details
- Born: 22 November 1971 (age 54)
- Party: Indian National Congress (before 2021, 2025 – present)
- Other political affiliations: Trinamool Congress (2021 – 2025)
- Occupation: Politician

Zenith Sangma is the former member of Meghalaya Legislative Assembly (MLA) from the Rangsakona constituency. He won the election in 2003, 2013, and 2018. Sangma was the Sports Minister of the Meghalaya Government for the period from 2013 to 2018. He is the brother of former Chief Minister of Meghalaya Mukul Sangma.
