= Ian Botham Sangma =

Indian politician

Ian Botham K. Sangma (born 1987) is an Indian politician from Meghalaya. He is a member of the Meghalaya Legislative Assembly representing the Salmanpara Assembly constituency in South West Garo Hills district. He was first elected in the 2023 Meghalaya Legislative Assembly election representing the National People's Party.

== Early life and education ==
Sangma is from Anangpara village, Ampati post, South West Garo Hils district, Meghalaya. He is the son of Danny Ch. Marak. He is a businessman and his wife is a lecturer at Tura Government College, Tura. He did his Master of Business Administration at University of Bedfordshire, United Kingdom in 2013.

== Career ==
Sangma won the Salmanpara Assembly constituency representing the National People's Party in the 2023 Meghalaya Legislative Assembly election. He polled 11,352 votes and defeated his nearest rival and sitting MLA, Winnerson D. Sangma of the All India Trinamool Congress, by a margin of 5,238 votes. He lost the 2018 Meghalaya Legislative Assembly election to Winnerson Sangma, who won on the Indian National Congress ticket.
