= Ngaitlang Dhar =

Indian politician

Member of Meghalaya Legislative Assembly
- In office 2013–2018
- Preceded by: E. K. Mawlong
- Succeeded by: George Bankyntiewlang Lyngdoh
- Constituency: Umroi

Personal details
- Party: NPP
- Occupation: Business
- Profession: Transporter

Ngaitlang Dhar was a member of Meghalaya Legislative Assembly from the Umroi constituency. He won the seat in 2013 assembly elections but lost his seat in the 2018 Meghalaya assembly elections.
