= Nongtalang Assembly constituency =

Constituency of the Meghalaya legislative assembly in India

Nongtalang
- Former constituency for the Meghalaya Legislative Assembly

Constituency details
- Country: India
- Region: Northeast India
- State: Meghalaya
- Established: 1972
- Abolished: 1977
- Total electors: 9,793

Nongtalang Assembly constituency was an assembly constituency in the India state of Meghalaya.

== Members of the Legislative Assembly ==
Election	Member	Party
1972	Enowell Pohshna	Independent politician

== Election results ==
=== Assembly Election 1972 ===
1972 Meghalaya Legislative Assembly election: Nongtalang
Party	Candidate	Votes	%	±%
Independent	Enowell Pohshna	2,426	38.10%	New
AHL	Johndeng Pohrmen	2,328	36.56%	New
Independent	Qhiwot Khonglah	1,570	24.66%	New
Independent	Thomas Mon Khonglah	43	0.68%	New
Margin of victory		98	1.54%	
Turnout		6,367	66.00%	
Registered electors		9,793		
Independent win (new seat)				
