= Adolf Lu Hitler Marak =

Indian politician (born c. 1958)

Adolf Lu Hitler Rangsak Marak

Personal details
- Born: 1958 or 1959 (age 67–68)
- Party: Nationalist Congress

Adolf Lu Hitler Rangsak Marak (born c. 1958) is an Indian politician of the Nationalist Congress Party who served as an environment and later cooperation minister until 2003 in the Government of Meghalaya.

== Biography ==
As a member of the Nationalist Congress Party, Marak served as forest and environment minister in the government of E. K. Mawlong and later as cooperation minister under Chief Minister Flinder Anderson Khonglam.

He lost his seat in the state assembly following the February 2003 elections. On 27 June 2003, he was arrested on charges of maintaining links with the banned militant group Achik National Volunteers' Council. He was released on bail about a month later. The following year he lost the Garo Hills District Council election for the Dengnakpara G.D.C. constituency to Roster Sangma of the Congress. He lost the 2003 legislative election by just over 300 votes to Zenith Sangma.

During the 2008 assembly elections in Meghalaya, he was arrested for violating the model code while campaigning, leading to the newspaper headline, "Adolf Lu Hitler arrested by John F Kennedy", as Kennedy was the name of the police superintendent. He reemerged as the victor in the 2008 legislative elections.

In 2022 he joined the Trinamool Congress.

== Name ==
In regard to his controversial name, Hitler Marak told the Hindustan Times, "Maybe my parents liked the name" and said, "I am happy with my name, although I don't have any dictatorial tendencies". He said immigration staff has asked about his name "many times" while traveling, but he tells them he "didn't have a role" in choosing it and has never struggled to obtain a visa.

In February 2013, it was widely reported in international media that Marak would be running again for the state assembly in Meghalaya, against some other oddly-named candidates, such as Frankenstein Momin and Billykid Sangma.
