= Garo Hills Autonomous District Council =

Local government body in Meghalaya, northeastern India

Coordinates: 25.931°N 90.896°E

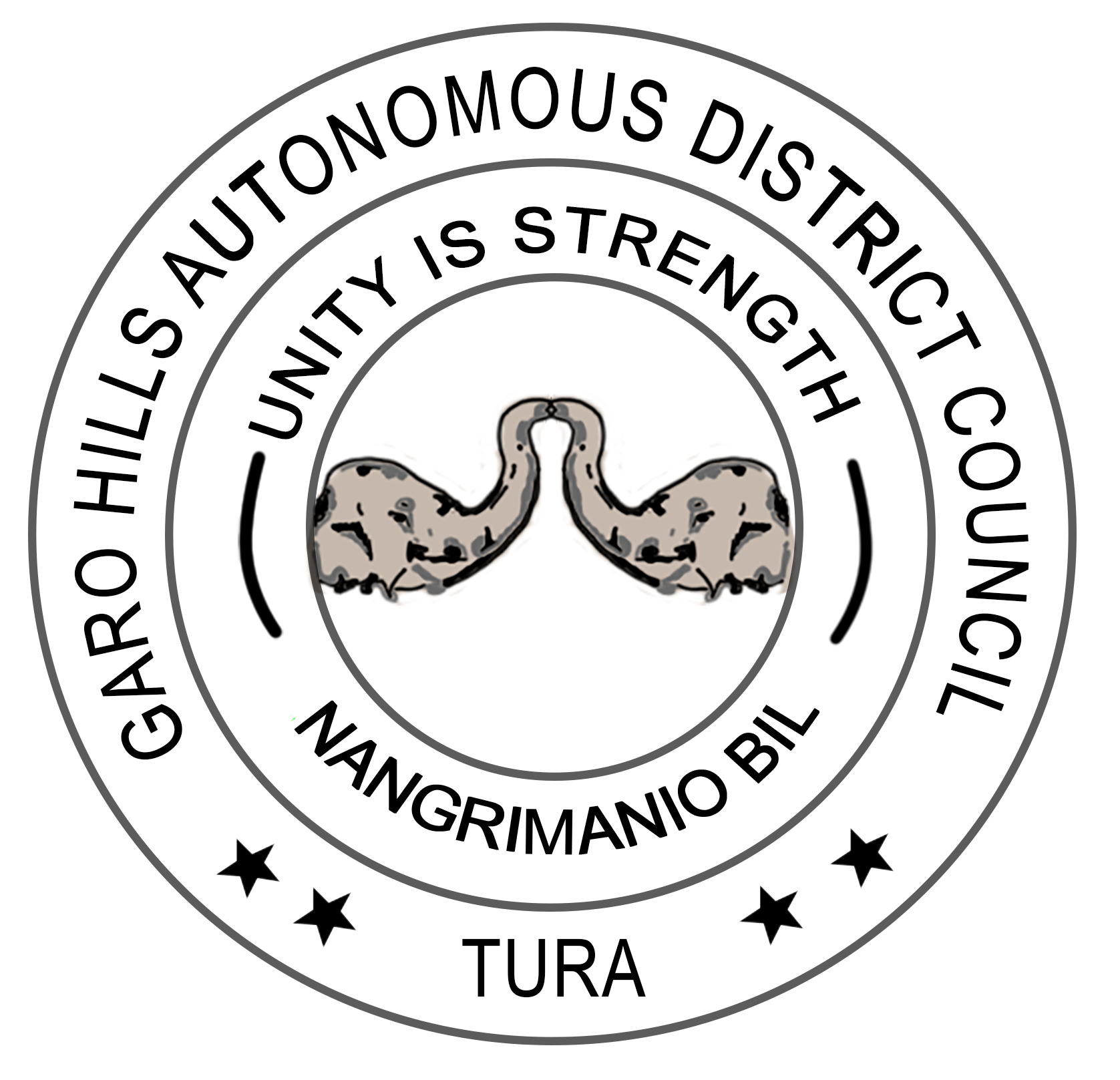

Type
- Type: Autonomous District Council

Leadership
- Chief Executive Member: Albinush R Marak, NPP

Structure
- Seats: 30 Councillors (29 elected + 1 nominated)
- Political groups: Government (16); MDA (16): NPP (11); BJP (2); IND (3); Opposition (13): AITC (12); GNC (1); Nominated (1): NOM (1)

Elections
- Voting system: 29 plurality voting
- Voting system: 1 nominated
- Last election: 12 April 2021
- Next election: 2027

Meeting place
- Tura, Meghalaya

Garo Hills Autonomous District Council (GHADC) is an autonomous district council in the state of Meghalaya in India. It is seated at Tura and covers East Garo Hills district, West Garo Hills district, South Garo Hills district, North Garo Hills district and South West Garo Hills district; is one of the three Autonomous District Councils within Meghalaya, and one of twenty-five autonomous regions of India. The total area of the Garo Hills Autonomous District Council is 10,102 sq km having a population of 1,394,362 as of 2011.

== History ==
The Constitution of India which was proclaimed in the year 1950 has under Article 244(2) a provision for administration of tribal areas in the then State of Assam as per Sixth Schedule to the Constitution. The States in the North Eastern Region were reconstituted by the North Eastern Areas (Reorganisation) Act 1971 and State of Meghalaya was formed comprising (a) the territories which immediately before that day were comprised in the autonomous State of Meghalaya and (b) so much of the territories comprised within the cantonment and municipality of Shillong, as did not form part of that autonomous State. The table appended to paragraph 20 was divided into three parts. Part II of the table covered the tribal areas of the State of Meghalaya as under:

- United Khasi-Jaintia Hills District
- Jowai District
- Garo Hills District

On 22 October 1976 the Garo Hills district was bifurcated into two districts: West Garo Hills district and East Garo Hills district. The West Garo Hills district was further divided into two districts: West Garo Hills district and South Garo Hills district in June 1992. The South West Garo Hills was carved out of present West Garo Hills and The North Garo Hills district was carved out of the erstwhile East Garo Hills district in 2012.

The Garo Hills Autonomous District Council therefore now comprises the following five districts:

1. East Garo Hills
2. North Garo Hills
3. South Garo Hills
4. South West Garo Hills
5. West Garo Hills

== Elections ==
Various elections are as follows:

- 2021 Garo Hills Autonomous District Council election
- 2015 Garo Hills Autonomous District Council election

== Structure ==
=== Executive Wing ===
Heading the Executive Wing of the ADC is the Executive Committee whose duties are similar to those of the Cabinet of the State. The head of the Executive Committee, that is, the Chief Executive Member is elected by majority votes by the Council in Session and such election is to be approved by the Governor of the State. The Chief Executive Member then nominates Members of the Executive Committee from amongst the members of the Council. The Executive Committee remains in Office as long as they enjoy the majority support of Members of the Council.

=== Legislative Wing ===
The members of the Council hold regular session once every four months. The Annual Budget of the ADC has to be passed by the majority votes by the Council in session. The other duties of the Council in session are to legislate and enact laws and regulations on such powers as conferred by the Sixth Schedule. Bills on laws and regulations passed by the Council in session are sent to the Governor of the State for his assent or approval.

To run the affairs of the Legislative Secretariat, the Council in session elects a Chairman and Deputy Chairman whose duties are similar to the speaker and the Deputy Speaker of the State Legislature. The Office of the Legislative is looked after by officers and staff headed by the Secretary Legislative.

=== Judiciary Wing ===
Paragraph 4 and 5 of the Sixth Schedule provides for administration of justice in Autonomous areas. Under the above paragraphs, the ADCs are empowered to constitute Courts for trials of cases between parties belonging to Scheduled Tribe Communities.

== See also ==
- Hill tribes of Northeast India
- North Eastern Council
