= Limison D. Sangma =

Indian politician

Limison D. Sangma (born 1967) is an Indian politician from Meghalaya. He is a member of the Meghalaya Legislative Assembly from the Raksamgre Assembly constituency, which is reserved for Scheduled Tribe community, in West Garo Hills district. He was first elected in the 2023 Meghalaya Legislative Assembly election representing the National People's Party (India).

== Early life and education ==
Sangma is from Boldampitbari village, Photamati post, West Garo Hills district, Meghalaya. He is the son of the late Bijen Sangma. He completed his diploma in civil engineering in 1996 at Shillong Polytechnic, Shillong. Earlier, he studied at Don Bosco School, Tura, and passed Class 10 examinations conducted by the Meghalaya Board of School Education in 1986.

== Career ==
Sangma won the Raksamgre Assembly constituency representing the National People's Party (India) in the 2023 Meghalaya Legislative Assembly election. He polled 12,184 votes and defeated his nearest rival, Benedic R. Marak of the Bharatiya Janata Party, by a margin of 2,818 votes.
