= Garo National Council =

Political party in Meghalaya, India

- Abbreviation: GNC
- Leader: Boston Marak
- Founded: 1948 (1946)
- ECI status: Unrecognised
- Alliance: United Progressive Alliance (2021-Present)
- Seats in Garo Hills Autonomous District Council: 1 / 29

The Garo National Council is a political party in Meghalaya in northeastern India which campaigns for the creation a new Indian state to be called Garoland, for the people of the Garo Hills.

Founded in February 1946 as the Garo National Conference, Moody K Marak was the first President. In 1948 the organisation was renamed the Garo National Council. The GNC was a founding member of the All Party Hill Leaders Conference (APHLC).

In 1998, the GNC was successful in electing Clifford Marak to the Meghalaya Legislative Assembly. Marak lost in 2003, but regained a seat in 2013 (he died in March 2015).

The GNC is a member of the Garo Hills State Movement Committee (GHSMC), a coalition of groups supporting the separate state of Garoland.

== Election results ==
Legislative Assembly election results
	Seats			Votes		
	Contested	Won	+/-	Total	%	+/-
1998	16	1		17,650	2.11	
2003	7	0	▼1	8,483	0.94	▼1.17
2008	4	0	Steady	4,081	0.37	▼0.57
2013	6	1	▲1	9,300	0.71	▲0.34
2018	6	0	▼1	21,682	1.38	▲0.67

Garo Hills Autonomous District Council
	Contested	Won	+/-
2002		1	
2015	5	3	
2019		1	
