= 1998 Meghalaya Legislative Assembly election =

- 16 February 1998

All 60 seats in the Meghalaya Legislative Assembly 31 seats needed for a majority
- Turnout: 74.52%
	First party	Second party
	INC	UDP
Party	INC	UDP
Seats before	24	21
Seats won	25	20
Seat change	1 ▲	1 ▼
Chief Minister before election
S. C. Marak
INC
Elected Chief Minister
S. C. Marak
INC

The 1998 Meghalaya Legislative Assembly election was held on 16 February 1998.

== Results ==
← Summary of the 16 February 1998 Meghalaya Legislative Assembly election results →
Parties and coalitions	Popular vote			Seats	
Parties and coalitions	Votes	%	±pp	Won	+/−
Indian National Congress (INC)	293,346	35.03	0.41 ▲	25	1 ▲
United Democratic Party (UDP)^{[a]}	226,026	26.99	6.48 ▼	20	1 ▼
People's Democratic Movement (PDM)	58,225	6.95		3	
Hill State People's Democratic Party	56,682	6.77		3	
Bharatiya Janata Party (BJP)	41,924	5.01	1.33 ▲	3	3 ▲
Garo National Council (GNC)	17,650	2.11		1	
Hindu Samaj Party (HSP)	4,754	0.57		0	
Communist Party of India (CPI)	1,387	0.17	0.03 ▲	0	Steady
Rashtriya Janata Dal	1,253	0.15		0	
Samajwadi Party	742	0.09		0	
Janata Dal	38	0.0		0	
Independents (IND)	135,356	17.28	1.12 ▼	5	5 ▼
Total	837,383	100.00		60	±0
Source: Election Commission of India

^{a} The UDP was formed in 1997 through a merger of the Hill People's Union (HPU), some members of the Hill State People's Democratic Party (HDP) and the Public Demands Implementation Convention (PDIC). Previous results presented in the table are the combined totals of parties' results from the 1993 election.

== Elected members ==
Winner, runner-up, voter turnout, and victory margin in every constituency
Assembly Constituency		Turnout	Winner				Runner Up				Margin
#k	Names	%	Candidate	Party	Votes	%	Candidate	Party	Votes	%	Margin
1	War-Jaintia	78.53%	Riang Lenon Tariang	UDP	6,608	38.89%	Johndeng Pohrmen	INC	5,898	34.71%	710
2	Rymbai	89.33%	Simon Siangshai	UDP	9,287	37.2%	Obil Kyndait	PDM	8,953	35.87%	334
3	Sutnga-Shangpung	82.96%	Oliverneat Chyrmang	UDP	7,282	43.48%	Shitlang Pale	INC	5,452	32.55%	1,830
4	Raliang	85.59%	Mishalan Suchiang	UDP	7,370	37.53%	Herbert Suchiang	INC	7,145	36.39%	225
5	Nartiang	82.37%	H. Britainwar Dan	UDP	7,735	43.25%	Henry Lamin	INC	5,451	30.48%	2,284
6	Nongbah-Wahiajer	82.89%	Kyrmen Susngi	UDP	8,887	52.24%	Edmund Speakerson Lyngdoh	INC	6,141	36.1%	2,746
7	Jowai	82.69%	Singh Mulieh	UDP	8,775	50.61%	Dr. Roytre Christopher Laloo	INC	8,563	49.39%	212
8	Mawhati	80.85%	Phingwel Muktieh	INC	3,941	28.4%	Rangkynsai Makdoh	Independent	3,245	23.38%	696
9	Umroi	75.83%	E. K. Mawlong	UDP	8,607	50.57%	Stanly Wiss Rymbai	PDM	5,529	32.49%	3,078
10	Nongpoh	79.81%	Dr. D. D. Lapang	INC	9,070	55.52%	Constantine Lyngdoh	UDP	6,566	40.19%	2,504
11	Jirang	66.76%	J. Dringwell Rymbai	INC	7,058	51.91%	Micheal Giri Dkhar	UDP	3,540	26.04%	3,518
12	Mairang	76.75%	Kitdor Syiem	INC	6,261	37.69%	Fuller Lyngdoh Mawnai	HSPDP	4,971	29.92%	1,290
13	Nongspung	77.85%	John Anthony Lyngdoh	UDP	6,128	38.26%	S. Loniak Marbaniang	INC	4,892	30.54%	1,236
14	Sohiong	80.77%	Rain Augustine Lyngdoh	UDP	8,506	47.52%	H. Donkupar R. Lyngdoh	INC	8,162	45.6%	344
15	Mylliem	77.45%	Pynshai Manik Syiem	Independent	7,421	50.65%	Sounder S. Cajee	PDM	6,815	46.52%	606
16	Malki-Nongthymmai	58.%	Tony Cortis Lyngdoh	INC	5,240	43.18%	Bindo Lanong	UDP	4,819	39.71%	421
17	Laitumkhrah	56.74%	Robert Garnett Lyngdoh	INC	4,975	50.89%	Margaret Rose Mawlong	UDP	2,837	29.02%	2,138
18	Pynthorumkhrah	62.33%	Alexander Laloo Hek	BJP	8,159	56.87%	James Marvin Pariat	INC	5,654	39.41%	2,505
19	Jaiaw	64.32%	A. H. Scott Lyngdoh	UDP	4,430	45.64%	Martamlin Pyrbot	BJP	2,381	24.53%	2,049
20	Mawkhar	61.62%	Roshan Warjri	UDP	3,228	50.27%	Dr. Friday Lyngdoh	INC	3,146	49.%	82
21	Mawprem	60.07%	Dhrubanath Joshi	INC	5,943	55.86%	H. Aiontis Roy Kharphuli	BJP	4,154	39.05%	1,789
22	Laban	61.96%	Thrang Hok Rangad	BJP	2,925	34.41%	Anthony Lyngdoh	UDP	2,418	28.45%	507
23	Mawlai	67.42%	Process T. Sawkmie	UDP	7,723	48.76%	Founder Strong Cajee	PDM	7,045	44.48%	678
24	Sohryngkham	71.52%	Sanbor Swell Lyngdoh	UDP	4,746	36.12%	Dapmain Khyriemmujat	INC	4,736	36.05%	10
25	Dienglieng	74.12%	Martle N Mukhim	UDP	5,655	46.51%	Medistar Warbah	INC	4,273	35.14%	1,382
26	Nongkrem	75.74%	Elston Roy Kharkongor	PDM	3,002	21.52%	John Filmore Kharshiing	UDP	2,016	14.45%	986
27	Langkyrdem	63.71%	Brington Buhai Lyngdoh	UDP	4,843	41.3%	Youngstenshon Tynsong	INC	4,026	34.33%	817
28	Nongshken	73.17%	Khan Khong Dkhar	INC	5,329	47.3%	Ganold Stone Massar	UDP	5,079	45.08%	250
29	Sohra	69.43%	Dr. Flinder Anderson Khonglam	Independent	4,221	38.76%	Walter David Lyngwi	INC	3,117	28.63%	1,104
30	Shella	65.03%	Dr. Donkupar Roy	UDP	3,773	44.38%	G.Granderson Syiemlieh	INC	2,962	34.84%	811
31	Mawsynram	74.72%	D. Plaslanding Iangjuh	UDP	4,492	35.79%	Mestonnath Kharchandy	INC	2,514	20.03%	1,978
32	Mawkyrwat	80.91%	B. Bires Nongsiej	UDP	4,248	30.11%	Rowell Lyngdoh	INC	4,074	28.87%	174
33	Pariong	74.57%	Tubarlin Lyngdoh	HSPDP	6,393	54.5%	Ricardus Iawphniaw	INC	2,363	20.14%	4,030
34	Nongstoin	65.67%	Hopingstone Lyngdoh	HSPDP	8,688	43.67%	Jesparwell Dkhar	INC	4,802	24.14%	3,886
35	Langrin	79.56%	Martin M. Danggo	PDM	4,584	32.49%	Probin K. Raswai	INC	4,460	31.61%	124
36	Mawthengkut	77.34%	Maysalin War	HSPDP	4,997	33.42%	H. Ledishon Nongsiang	INC	4,400	29.43%	597
37	Baghmara	79.22%	Lotsing A. Sangma	INC	6,414	49.5%	Sengran M. Sangma	UDP	5,744	44.33%	670
38	Rongrenggiri	67.09%	Debora C. Marak	INC	7,046	40.89%	Projend D. Sangma	UDP	5,323	30.89%	1,723
39	Rongjeng	72.1%	Sujit Sangma	INC	5,483	46.63%	Pleander G. Momin	UDP	2,944	25.04%	2,539
40	Kharkutta	74.18%	Elstone D. Marak	INC	6,324	48.43%	Omillo K. Sangma	Independent	2,599	19.9%	3,725
41	Mendipathar	79.26%	Frankenstein W. Momin	INC	6,046	40.33%	Beninstand G. Momin	UDP	5,901	39.36%	145
42	Resubelpara	76.16%	Salseng C. Marak	INC	6,526	49.51%	Timothy Shira	UDP	6,244	47.37%	282
43	Songsak	74.29%	Tonsing N Marak	INC	4,089	34.08%	Heltone N. Marak	UDP	1,817	15.14%	2,272
44	Bajengdoba	76.54%	Chamberline B. Marak	INC	6,212	49.79%	John Manner Marak	UDP	6,018	48.23%	194
45	Tikrikilla	77.84%	Mohindra Rava	INC	4,618	35.17%	Nagendra Rabha	Independent	3,598	27.4%	1,020
46	Dadenggre	77.41%	Augustine D.Marak	Independent	7,871	49.03%	Edmund K. Sangma	INC	6,830	42.55%	1,041
47	Rongchugiri	82.17%	Beckstar Sangma	INC	4,841	45.8%	Sherjee M. Sangma	Independent	2,839	26.86%	2,002
48	Phulbari	83.37%	Abu Taher Mondal	Independent	3,597	20.63%	Manirul Islam Sarkar	Independent	3,393	19.46%	204
49	Rajabala	82.04%	Kapin Ch. Boro	INC	6,620	41.06%	Sayeedullah Nongrum	UDP	6,491	40.26%	129
50	Selsella	77.68%	Cyprian R. Sangma	PDM	4,333	41.85%	Atul C. Marak	INC	3,539	34.18%	794
51	Rongram	69.58%	Methrona Marak	INC	3,032	22.73%	Cary Marak	Independent	2,162	16.21%	870
52	Tura	58.3%	Kulert Cheran Momin	Independent	7,126	33.2%	Joylance Momin	INC	6,741	31.4%	385
53	Chokpot	76.94%	Clifford R. Marak	GNC	4,868	44.97%	Masonsing Sangma	INC	4,411	40.75%	457
54	Kherapara	75.43%	Brening Sangma	INC	6,389	53.73%	Jennar S. Marak	GNC	2,687	22.6%	3,702
55	Dalu	75.35%	Nityanarayan Smchang	BJP	3,915	36.97%	Archibold Sangma	INC	3,615	34.14%	300
56	Dalamgiri	80.11%	Admiral K. Sangma	INC	4,618	41.86%	Semford Sangma	Independent	4,062	36.82%	556
57	Rangsakona	80.53%	Adolf Lu Hitler Marak	INC	6,403	54.28%	Dipul R. Marak	Independent	3,382	28.67%	3,021
58	Ampatigiri	82.07%	Dr. Mukul Sangma	INC	9,235	57.87%	Monendro Agitok	Independent	4,310	27.01%	4,925
59	Salmanpara	75.06%	Nimarson Momin	UDP	4,933	38.29%	Gopinath Sangma	INC	4,146	32.18%	787
60	Mahendraganj	86.62%	Abdus Saleh	INC	4,933	36.93%	Mahendra Modak	BJP	3,294	24.66%	1,639
