= 1988 Meghalaya Legislative Assembly election =

- 2 February 1988

All 60 seats in the Meghalaya Legislative Assembly 31 seats needed for a majority
- Turnout: 77.51%
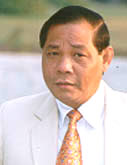
	First party	Second party
Party	INC	HSPDP
Seats before	25	15
Seats won	22	6
Seat change	3 ▼	9 ▼
Popular vote	198,028	78,884
Percentage	32.65	12.68
Swing	4.97 ▲	6.64 ▼
Chief Minister before election
Williamson A. Sangma
INC
Elected Chief Minister
Purno A. Sangma
INC

The 1988 Meghalaya Legislative Assembly election was held on 2 February 1988. In the lead up to the election, sporadic violence targeted at the Indian Nepali population of the state occurred. No party secured a majority of seats and two women were elected.

Following the election, on 6 February 1988, the United Meghalaya Parliamentary Democratic Forum coalition was formed between the Indian National Congress (INC), the Hill People's Union (HPU), the All Party Hill Leaders Conference (Armison Marak Group) and independents. Purno A. Sangma (from the INC) was successfully nominated as Chief Minister.

== Results ==
← Summary of the 2 February 1988 Meghalaya Legislative Assembly election results →
Parties and coalitions	Popular vote			Seats	
Parties and coalitions	Votes	%	±pp	Won	+/−
Indian National Congress (INC)	198,028	32.65	4.97 ▲	22	3 ▼
Hill People's Union (HPU)	162,806	26.84		19	
Hill State People's Democratic Party (HDP)	78,884	12.68	6.64 ▼	6	9 ▼
All Party Hill Leaders Conference (Armison Marak Group)	28,391	4.68		2	
Public Demands Implementation Convention (PDIC)	19,402	3.2	1.62 ▼	2	Steady
Communist Party of India (CPI)	2,206	0.36	0.16 ▼	0	Steady
Independents (IND)	118,816	19.59	2.9 ▼	9	6 ▲
Total	606,533	100.00		60	±0
Source: Election Commission of India

== Elected members ==
Winner, runner-up, voter turnout, and victory margin in every constituency
Assembly Constituency		Turnout	Winner				Runner Up				Margin
#k	Names	%	Candidate	Party	Votes	%	Candidate	Party	Votes	%	Margin
1	War-Jaintia	84.1%	Johndeng Pohrmen	INC	4,281	37.36%	H. Enowell Pohshna	HSPDP	3,824	33.37%	457
2	Rymbai	91.66%	Simon Siangshai	Independent	3,869	26.19%	Obil Kyndiat	Independent	3,220	21.79%	649
3	Sutnga-Shangpung	88.67%	Onward Leyswell Nongtdu	INC	5,536	49.78%	Barrister Pakem	HPU	5,484	49.32%	52
4	Raliang	90.99%	Herbert Suchiang	INC	5,558	38.72%	Mihsalan Suchiang	HPU	4,993	34.79%	565
5	Nartiang	83.4%	H. Britainwar Dan	INC	3,384	26.84%	Henry Lamin	HPU	3,201	25.39%	183
6	Nongbah-Wahiajer	92.09%	Kyrmen Susngi	Independent	3,282	26.44%	Edmund Speakerson Lyngdoh	HSPDP	3,230	26.03%	52
7	Jowai	87.77%	Dr. Roytre Christopher Laloo	INC	3,645	34.68%	Guinton Passah	HPU	2,843	27.05%	802
8	Mawhati	78.85%	S. R. Moksha	HPU	3,550	36.81%	Martin N. Majaw	Independent	2,547	26.41%	1,003
9	Umroi	77.93%	E. K. Mawlong	HSPDP	6,340	57.74%	Fleming Stone Lapang	INC	4,641	42.26%	1,699
10	Nongpoh	80.3%	Dr. D. D. Lapang	INC	4,758	45.1%	Chosterfield Khongwir	HSPDP	3,576	33.9%	1,182
11	Jirang	62.65%	J. Dringwell Rymbai	INC	2,095	26.29%	Gerson Lyngdoh	HPU	1,677	21.05%	418
12	Mairang	85.%	Fuller Lyngdon Mawnai	HSPDP	6,303	51.37%	Kitdor Syiem	Independent	5,744	46.81%	559
13	Nongspung	82.85%	S. Loniak Marbaniang	HSPDP	4,119	35.76%	Winstone Syiemiong	HPU	3,900	33.86%	219
14	Sohiong	83.29%	M. Donkupar Lyngdoh	HSPDP	6,135	48.3%	Nit Shabong	INC	4,163	32.77%	1,972
15	Mylliem	75.23%	Dentist Mohan Roy Kharkongor	HPU	2,754	26.43%	Oris Lyngdoh	INC	2,272	21.81%	482
16	Malki-Nongthymmai	66.01%	Upstar Kharbuli	INC	4,171	45.96%	Bindo Lanong	HPU	3,272	36.06%	899
17	Laitumkhrah	64.27%	Peter G. Mareaniang	INC	4,313	55.86%	J. Khonglah	HPU	3,249	42.08%	1,064
18	Pynthorumkhrah	73.79%	James Marvin Pariat	Independent	5,936	62.66%	B. K. Roy	INC	2,792	29.47%	3,144
19	Jaiaw	70.49%	P. Ripple Kyndiah	INC	3,918	39.96%	A. H. Scott Lyngdoh	HPU	3,030	30.9%	888
20	Mawkhar	67.06%	Korbar Singh	HPU	3,338	54.16%	W. Humphrey Dolly Syngkon	INC	2,825	45.84%	513
21	Mawprem	68.81%	Dhrubanath Joshi	INC	4,119	58.05%	Hereford S. Sawian	Independent	2,553	35.98%	1,566
22	Laban	69.22%	Anthony Lyngdoh	HPU	3,964	50.63%	Bhaskar Choudhary	INC	3,026	38.65%	938
23	Mawlai	69.65%	S. D. Khongwir	HPU	6,172	59.62%	M. S. Lyngdoh Myrdon	Independent	1,809	17.47%	4,363
24	Sohryngkham	78.98%	Sanbor Swell Lyngdoh	PDC	3,709	35.75%	Protoasius Pungrope	HSPDP	2,322	22.38%	1,387
25	Dienglieng	79.05%	Martle N Mukhim	PDC	5,809	53.16%	Medistar Warbah	INC	3,366	30.8%	2,443
26	Nongkrem	82.79%	H. S. Shylla	INC	3,779	32.29%	Dominic Robun Nongkynrih	PDC	3,231	27.61%	548
27	Langkyrdem	73.94%	Brington Buhai Lyngdoh	HPU	6,100	56.67%	Denis Ryngjah	INC	3,979	36.96%	2,121
28	Nongshken	73.28%	Ganold Stone Massar	HPU	4,138	47.45%	S. Dkhar	INC	2,193	25.15%	1,945
29	Sohra	77.03%	S. Phaindrojen Swer	HPU	4,601	48.31%	Dr. Flinder Anderson Khonglam	INC	3,951	41.48%	650
30	Shella	74.16%	Dr. Donkupar Roy	Independent	2,110	27.74%	S. Galmender Singh Lyngdoh	HPU	1,692	22.24%	418
31	Mawsynram	75.23%	Mestonnath Kharchandy	INC	3,934	40.29%	D. Plaslanding Iangjuh	HPU	3,103	31.78%	831
32	Mawkyrwat	80.44%	Bires Nongsiej	HPU	4,359	37.73%	Rowell Lyngdoh	INC	3,170	27.44%	1,189
33	Pariong	73.56%	Hopingstone Lyngdoh	HSPDP	6,436	70.15%	D. Darius Lyngkhoi	INC	2,025	22.07%	4,411
34	Nongstoin	56.69%	Hopingstone Lyngdoh	HSPDP	6,276	48.52%	Francis K. Mawlot	INC	5,487	42.42%	789
35	Langrin	82.23%	Probin K. Raswai	INC	5,530	51.82%	Bakstarwell Wanniang	HPU	3,212	30.1%	2,318
36	Mawthengkut	66.49%	Maysalin War	INC	4,001	40.59%	H. Ledishon Nongsiang	HSPDP	3,749	38.04%	252
37	Baghmara	74.43%	Williamson A. Sangma	INC	5,496	65.99%	Weable Ch. Sangma	Independent	2,833	34.01%	2,663
38	Rongrenggiri	71.53%	Projend D. Sangma	HPU	4,559	41.67%	Albinstone M. Sangma	INC	3,177	29.04%	1,382
39	Rongjeng	73.31%	Pleander G. Momin	HPU	1,884	24.65%	Sujit Sangma	Independent	1,611	21.08%	273
40	Kharkutta	68.29%	Luderberg Ch. Momin	HPU	3,490	44.18%	Pretting Tone Sangma	INC	3,279	41.51%	211
41	Mendipathar	81.7%	Beninstand G. Momin	HPU	5,809	55.34%	Jamindro R. Marak	INC	4,687	44.66%	1,122
42	Resubelpara	82.07%	Salseng C. Marak	INC	5,812	58.91%	Timothy Shira	HPU	4,054	41.09%	1,758
43	Songsak	66.37%	Lahinson M. Sangnia	HPU	3,047	42.34%	Choronsing Sangma	INC	1,219	16.94%	1,828
44	Bajengdoba	77.18%	Chamberline Marak	INC	5,583	64.63%	Grohonsing Marak	HPU	3,056	35.37%	2,527
45	Tikrikilla	85.93%	Kapin Ch. Boro	Independent	3,520	33.91%	Monindra Rava	INC	2,768	26.67%	752
46	Dadenggre	67.82%	Norwin B. Sangma	INC	3,586	34.74%	Denison Sangma	HPU	2,151	20.84%	1,435
47	Rongchugiri	80.48%	Sherjee M. Sangma	HPU	3,719	46.26%	William Cecil Marak	INC	2,258	28.09%	1,461
48	Phulbari	89.39%	Parimal Rava	HPU	3,848	29.9%	Sofior Rahman Hazarika	INC	2,470	19.19%	1,378
49	Rajabala	87.23%	Miriam D. Shira	Independent	3,459	27.22%	Sibendra Narayan Koch	Independent	2,646	20.82%	813
50	Selsella	81.84%	Atul C. Marak	INC	4,115	49.08%	Jarnas Bangshall	HPU	3,456	41.22%	659
51	Rongram	78.73%	Godwin D. Shira	INC	3,215	32.88%	Clement Marak	Independent	1,923	19.67%	1,292
52	Tura	73.63%	Purno Agitok Sangma	INC	7,003	48.61%	Barthiar Marak	HPU	1,909	13.25%	5,094
53	Chokpot	77.92%	Clifford R. Marak	HPU	3,116	39.67%	Jinjar N. Sangma	INC	2,927	37.27%	189
54	Kherapara	73.28%	Chamberun Marak	Independent	2,591	30.05%	Roster M. Sangma	INC	2,591	30.05%	1
55	Dalu	81.3%	Mountabatien K. Sangma	INC	2,746	34.48%	Archibold A. Sangma	HPU	1,923	24.15%	823
56	Dalamgiri	81.08%	Ira Marak	INC	3,805	45.1%	Binsing Marak	HPU	720	8.53%	3,085
57	Rangsakona	83.31%	Chesterfield Marak	HPU	3,522	38.64%	Pipinson Momin	Independent	2,639	28.95%	883
58	Ampatigiri	85.38%	Monendro Agitok	Independent	5,025	40.31%	Bhadreswar Koch	INC	4,059	32.56%	966
59	Salmanpara	80.04%	Nimarson Momin	Independent	4,714	48.98%	Metalson Sangma	HPU	2,396	24.9%	2,318
60	Mahendraganj	87.45%	Dhabal Ch. Barman	HPU	5,558	54.61%	Harakanta Barman	INC	4,165	40.93%	1,393
