= Sohryngkham Assembly constituency =

Constituency of the Meghalaya legislative assembly in India

Sohryngkham
- Former constituency for the Meghalaya Legislative Assembly

Constituency details
- Country: India
- Region: Northeast India
- State: Meghalaya
- Established: 1972
- Abolished: 2013
- Total electors: 23,474

Sohryngkham Assembly constituency was an assembly constituency in the India state of Meghalaya.

== Members of the Legislative Assembly ==
Election	Member	Party
1972	G. Nilliemncap	Independent politician
1978	Grosswell Mylliemngap	All Party Hill Leaders Conference
1983	Grosswell Mylliemngap	All Party Hill Leaders Conference
1988	Sanbor Swell Lyngdoh	Public Demands Implementation Convention
1993	Sanbor Swell Lyngdoh	Public Demands Implementation Convention
1998	Sanbor Swell Lyngdoh	United Democratic Party
2003	Charles Pyngrope	Indian National Congress
2008	Charles Pyngrope	Indian National Congress

== Election results ==
=== Assembly Election 2008 ===
2008 Meghalaya Legislative Assembly election: Sohryngkham
Party	Candidate	Votes	%	±%
INC	Charles Pyngrope	9,639	46.99%	▲18.06
KHNAM	Dr. Osaphi Smithson Jyrwa	5,458	26.61%	New
UDP	David Kharsati	3,810	18.57%	▲7.94
LJP	Bandonbok Pyngrope	1,219	5.94%	New
BJP	Manosha Warjri	387	1.89%	New
Margin of victory		4,181	20.38%	▲18.89
Turnout		20,513	87.39%	▲16.00
Registered electors		23,474		▲10.50
INC hold		Swing	▲18.06	

=== Assembly Election 2003 ===
2003 Meghalaya Legislative Assembly election: Sohryngkham
Party	Candidate	Votes	%	±%
INC	Charles Pyngrope	4,388	28.93%	▼7.11
Independent	J. Ulysses Nongrum	4,161	27.44%	New
MDP	Sanbor Swell Lyngdoh	3,530	23.28%	New
UDP	David Kharsati	1,612	10.63%	▼25.49
HSPDP	Campbell Kharsati	1,475	9.73%	New
Margin of victory		227	1.50%	▲1.42
Turnout		15,166	71.39%	▲1.23
Registered electors		21,244		▲13.44
INC gain from UDP		Swing	▼7.19	

=== Assembly Election 1998 ===
1998 Meghalaya Legislative Assembly election: Sohryngkham
Party	Candidate	Votes	%	±%
UDP	Sanbor Swell Lyngdoh	4,746	36.12%	New
INC	Dapmain Khyriemmujat	4,736	36.05%	▲20.43
PDM	Campbell Kharsati	3,313	25.22%	New
BJP	John K. Umnuid	280	2.13%	New
SP	Helington Mukhim	64	0.49%	New
Margin of victory		10	0.08%	▼10.61
Turnout		13,139	71.52%	▼10.60
Registered electors		18,727		▲12.98
UDP gain from PDC		Swing	▼0.98	

=== Assembly Election 1993 ===
1993 Meghalaya Legislative Assembly election: Sohryngkham
Party	Candidate	Votes	%	±%
PDC	Sanbor Swell Lyngdoh	4,967	37.10%	▲1.35
AHL(AM)	Dapmain Khyriemmujat	3,536	26.41%	New
INC	Protoasius Pungrope	2,090	15.61%	▼3.99
Independent	Justgrain Myrboh	1,294	9.67%	New
Independent	Watklet Pyngrope	582	4.35%	New
Independent	Raginald Susngi	430	3.21%	New
Independent	Roy Rojes Warlarpih	307	2.29%	New
Margin of victory		1,431	10.69%	▼2.68
Turnout		13,387	82.51%	▲3.42
Registered electors		16,576		▲23.57
PDC hold		Swing	▲1.35	

=== Assembly Election 1988 ===
1988 Meghalaya Legislative Assembly election: Sohryngkham
Party	Candidate	Votes	%	±%
PDC	Sanbor Swell Lyngdoh	3,709	35.75%	▲7.98
HSPDP	Protoasius Pungrope	2,322	22.38%	▲4.42
HPU	Dapmain Khyriemmujat	2,283	22.00%	New
INC	G. Mylliemngap	2,034	19.60%	▲12.81
Independent	Bendro Najiar	27	0.26%	New
Margin of victory		1,387	13.37%	▲2.22
Turnout		10,375	78.98%	▲4.27
Registered electors		13,414		▲29.67
PDC gain from AHL		Swing	▼3.17	

=== Assembly Election 1983 ===
1983 Meghalaya Legislative Assembly election: Sohryngkham
Party	Candidate	Votes	%	±%
AHL	Grosswell Mylliemngap	2,942	38.92%	▼5.04
PDC	Dringson E. Shallam	2,099	27.76%	New
HSPDP	Bormanik Kharpran	1,358	17.96%	▼0.11
INC	Naramai Langstieh	514	6.80%	▲0.05
Independent	Edward R. Sohtun	374	4.95%	New
Independent	Grayneson Mawthoh	273	3.61%	New
Margin of victory		843	11.15%	▼8.87
Turnout		7,560	76.08%	▲7.84
Registered electors		10,345		▲6.74
AHL hold		Swing	▼5.04	

=== Assembly Election 1978 ===
1978 Meghalaya Legislative Assembly election: Sohryngkham
Party	Candidate	Votes	%	±%
AHL	Grosswell Mylliemngap	2,779	43.95%	▲27.32
Independent	Dringson E. Shallam	1,513	23.93%	New
HSPDP	Finongkynrih	1,143	18.08%	New
INC	Holdel Kharumnuin	427	6.75%	New
Independent	Bendrowell Najiar	284	4.49%	New
Independent	James Booth	177	2.80%	New
Margin of victory		1,266	20.02%	▲4.17
Turnout		6,323	67.10%	▲9.68
Registered electors		9,692		▲44.44
AHL gain from Independent		Swing	▲6.08	

=== Assembly Election 1972 ===
1972 Meghalaya Legislative Assembly election: Sohryngkham
Party	Candidate	Votes	%	±%
Independent	G. Nilliemncap	1,412	37.88%	New
Independent	Dlein Kharumnuid	821	22.02%	New
Independent	Firster Nongkynrih	683	18.32%	New
AHL	Rokendro Dkhar	620	16.63%	New
Independent	Bendro Najiat	192	5.15%	New
Margin of victory		591	15.85%	
Turnout		3,728	56.97%	
Registered electors		6,710		
Independent win (new seat)				
