= Mawthengkut Assembly constituency =

Constituency of the Meghalaya legislative assembly in India

Mawthengkut
- Former constituency for the Meghalaya Legislative Assembly

Constituency details
- Country: India
- Region: Northeast India
- State: Meghalaya
- Established: 1972
- Abolished: 2013
- Total electors: 23,220

Mawthengkut Assembly constituency was an assembly constituency in the India state of Meghalaya.

== Members of the Legislative Assembly ==
Election	Member	Party
1972	Raisen Mawsor	Independent politician
1973 By-election	Raisen Mawsor	Independent politician
1978	Ledishon Nongsiang	Hill State People's Democratic Party
1983	H. Ledishon Nongsiang	Hill State People's Democratic Party
1988	Maysalin War	Indian National Congress
1993	H. Ledishon Nongsiang	Hill State People's Democratic Party
1998	Maysalin War	Hill State People's Democratic Party
2003	Francis Pondit R. Sangma	Independent politician
2008	Francis Pondit R. Sangma	Indian National Congress

== Election results ==
=== Assembly Election 2008 ===
2008 Meghalaya Legislative Assembly election: Mawthengkut
Party	Candidate	Votes	%	±%
INC	Francis Pondit R. Sangma	6,451	31.35%	▲5.71
HSPDP	K. Phlasting Well Pangniang	4,126	20.05%	▲0.16
UDP	Fantin Kitbok Ryntathiang	3,325	16.16%	New
MDP	H. Ledishon Nongsiang	3,100	15.06%	▲3.82
NCP	Chenang Ch. Marak	2,133	10.37%	▲0.64
Independent	Mehallin S. Marak	588	2.86%	New
Independent	Maysalin War	506	2.46%	New
Margin of victory		2,325	11.30%	▲6.12
Turnout		20,578	88.62%	▲16.72
Registered electors		23,220		▲0.63
INC gain from Independent		Swing	▲0.53	

=== Assembly Election 2003 ===
2003 Meghalaya Legislative Assembly election: Mawthengkut
Party	Candidate	Votes	%	±%
Independent	Francis Pondit R. Sangma	5,114	30.82%	New
INC	H. Ledishon Nongsiang	4,254	25.64%	▼3.79
HSPDP	Phlastingwel Pangniang	3,300	19.89%	▼13.53
MDP	J. G. Rynniaw	1,866	11.25%	New
NCP	Maysalin War	1,613	9.72%	New
Independent	Dr. Alexander Lyngdoh	445	2.68%	New
Margin of victory		860	5.18%	▲1.19
Turnout		16,592	71.90%	▼2.12
Registered electors		23,075		▲14.24
Independent gain from HSPDP		Swing	▼2.60	

=== Assembly Election 1998 ===
1998 Meghalaya Legislative Assembly election: Mawthengkut
Party	Candidate	Votes	%	±%
HSPDP	Maysalin War	4,997	33.42%	▼11.36
INC	H. Ledishon Nongsiang	4,400	29.43%	▼15.00
UDP	Godwin K. Marak	3,002	20.08%	New
PDM	Lazarus Lawrence Nongmin	2,025	13.54%	New
BJP	Fredolin Sohphoh	528	3.53%	New
Margin of victory		597	3.99%	▲3.64
Turnout		14,952	77.34%	▼3.78
Registered electors		20,198		▲5.08
HSPDP hold		Swing	▼11.36	

=== Assembly Election 1993 ===
1993 Meghalaya Legislative Assembly election: Mawthengkut
Party	Candidate	Votes	%	±%
HSPDP	H. Ledishon Nongsiang	6,698	44.78%	▲6.75
INC	Maysalin War	6,645	44.43%	▲3.84
AHL(AM)	J. G. Rynniaw	1,148	7.68%	New
Independent	Stalin Stephan Rajee	411	2.75%	New
Independent	Listar Well Diengngan	27	0.18%	New
Independent	Phisil Rongrin	27	0.18%	New
Margin of victory		53	0.35%	▼2.20
Turnout		14,956	80.07%	▲14.16
Registered electors		19,222		▲24.13
HSPDP gain from INC		Swing	▲4.19	

=== Assembly Election 1988 ===
1988 Meghalaya Legislative Assembly election: Mawthengkut
Party	Candidate	Votes	%	±%
INC	Maysalin War	4,001	40.59%	▲12.45
HSPDP	H. Ledishon Nongsiang	3,749	38.04%	▲7.06
HPU	Raisen Mawsor	2,106	21.37%	New
Margin of victory		252	2.56%	▼0.27
Turnout		9,856	66.49%	▼2.63
Registered electors		15,486		▲16.63
INC gain from HSPDP		Swing		

=== Assembly Election 1983 ===
1983 Meghalaya Legislative Assembly election: Mawthengkut
Party	Candidate	Votes	%	±%
HSPDP	H. Ledishon Nongsiang	2,726	30.98%	▼2.55
INC	Eblin J. Sangma	2,477	28.15%	▼4.73
AHL	Maysalin War	2,141	24.33%	▼8.77
Independent	Raisen Mawsor	1,359	15.44%	New
PDC	Edren Lynghkhoi	97	1.10%	New
Margin of victory		249	2.83%	▲2.40
Turnout		8,800	70.44%	▲10.27
Registered electors		13,278		▲18.11
HSPDP hold		Swing	▼2.55	

=== Assembly Election 1978 ===
1978 Meghalaya Legislative Assembly election: Mawthengkut
Party	Candidate	Votes	%	±%
HSPDP	Ledishon Nongsiang	2,111	33.53%	New
AHL	Maysalin War	2,084	33.10%	▼1.64
INC	Raisen Mawsor	2,070	32.88%	New
Independent	H. Franslow Wahlang	17	0.27%	New
Independent	S. C. Roy Syiemlieh	14	0.22%	New
Margin of victory		27	0.43%	▼29.06
Turnout		6,296	58.48%	▲4.29
Registered electors		11,242		▲66.11
HSPDP gain from Independent		Swing	▼30.70	

=== Assembly By-election 1973 ===
1973 Meghalaya Legislative Assembly by-election: Mawthengkut
Party	Candidate	Votes	%	±%
Independent	Raisen Mawsor	2,111	51.94%	New
AHL	Maysalin War	1,953	48.06%	▲13.31
Margin of victory		158	3.89%	▼25.60
Turnout		4,064		
Independent hold		Swing		

=== Assembly Election 1972 ===
1972 Meghalaya Legislative Assembly election: Mawthengkut
Party	Candidate	Votes	%	±%
Independent	Raisen Mawsor	2,248	64.23%	New
AHL	Maysalin War	1,216	34.74%	New
Independent	Saroiyrai Marwiein	36	1.03%	New
Margin of victory		1,032	29.49%	
Turnout		3,500	53.62%	
Registered electors		6,768		
Independent win (new seat)				
