= Laban Assembly constituency =

Constituency of the Meghalaya legislative assembly in India

Laban
- Former constituency for the Meghalaya Legislative Assembly

Constituency details
- Country: India
- Region: Northeast India
- State: Meghalaya
- Established: 1972
- Abolished: 2013
- Total electors: 13,119

Laban Assembly constituency was an assembly constituency in the India state of Meghalaya.

== Members of the Legislative Assembly ==
| Election | Member | Party |
|---|---|---|
| 1972 | Parsvanath Choudhury | Indian National Congress |
| 1978 | Bhaskar Choudhury | Indian National Congress |
| 1983 | Bhaskar Choudhury | Indian National Congress |
| 1988 | Anthony Lyngdoh | Hill People's Union |
| 1993 | Anthony Lyngdoh | Hill People's Union |
| 1998 | Thrang Hok Rangad | Bharatiya Janata Party |
| 2003 | Thrang Hok Rangad | Bharatiya Janata Party |
| 2008 | Sanbor Shullai | Nationalist Congress Party |

== Election results ==
=== Assembly Election 2008 ===
2008 Meghalaya Legislative Assembly election: Laban
| Party | Candidate | Votes | % | ±% |
|---|---|---|---|---|
| NCP | Sanbor Shullai | 4,741 | 44.59% | ▲34.73 |
| BJP | Edward L Kharwanlang | 2,303 | 21.66% | ▼38.19 |
| UDP | Banri Kupar Wahlang | 1,426 | 13.41% | ▲11.69 |
| INC | Sanjoy Das | 1,363 | 12.82% | ▼12.24 |
| Independent | Herman Nongrum | 483 | 4.54% | New |
| Independent | Tilok Das Gupta | 159 | 1.50% | New |
| LJP | Irene Patricia Hujon | 158 | 1.49% | New |
| Margin of victory | | 2,438 | 22.93% | ▼11.86 |
| Turnout | | 10,633 | 81.05% | ▲25.95 |
| Registered electors | | 13,119 | | ▼13.57 |
| NCP gain from BJP | | Swing | ▼15.26 | |

=== Assembly Election 2003 ===
2003 Meghalaya Legislative Assembly election: Laban
| Party | Candidate | Votes | % | ±% |
|---|---|---|---|---|
| BJP | Thrang Hok Rangad | 5,005 | 59.85% | ▲25.44 |
| INC | Anthony Lyngdoh | 2,096 | 25.06% | ▲14.98 |
| NCP | H.Aiontis Roy Kharphuli | 824 | 9.85% | New |
| Independent | Biswajit Barua | 294 | 3.52% | New |
| UDP | Carland M. Nonglait | 144 | 1.72% | ▼26.73 |
| Margin of victory | | 2,909 | 34.78% | ▲28.82 |
| Turnout | | 8,363 | 55.13% | ▼5.16 |
| Registered electors | | 15,178 | | ▲7.61 |
| BJP hold | | Swing | ▲25.44 | |

=== Assembly Election 1998 ===
1998 Meghalaya Legislative Assembly election: Laban
| Party | Candidate | Votes | % | ±% |
|---|---|---|---|---|
| BJP | Thrang Hok Rangad | 2,925 | 34.41% | ▲3.39 |
| UDP | Anthony Lyngdoh | 2,418 | 28.45% | New |
| PDM | Wangbok Star Lyngdoh | 1,135 | 13.35% | New |
| INC | Carland M. Nonglait | 857 | 10.08% | ▼3.07 |
| RJD | Biswajit Barua | 515 | 6.06% | New |
| Independent | Doncaster Shabong | 402 | 4.73% | New |
| CPI | Fasterwell Marbaniang | 98 | 1.15% | New |
| Margin of victory | | 507 | 5.96% | ▼2.48 |
| Turnout | | 8,500 | 61.96% | ▼9.05 |
| Registered electors | | 14,105 | | ▲4.33 |
| BJP gain from HPU | | Swing | ▼5.05 | |

=== Assembly Election 1993 ===
1993 Meghalaya Legislative Assembly election: Laban
| Party | Candidate | Votes | % | ±% |
|---|---|---|---|---|
| HPU | Anthony Lyngdoh | 3,698 | 39.47% | ▼11.16 |
| BJP | Thrang Hok Rangad | 2,907 | 31.02% | New |
| INC | Manash Das Gupta | 1,232 | 13.15% | ▼25.50 |
| AHL(AM) | W.Hajon | 928 | 9.90% | New |
| Independent | Garland Nonglait | 277 | 2.96% | New |
| Independent | Omarka Lyngdoh | 254 | 2.71% | New |
| Independent | P. K. R. Deb | 74 | 0.79% | New |
| Margin of victory | | 791 | 8.44% | ▼3.54 |
| Turnout | | 9,370 | 70.66% | ▲1.77 |
| Registered electors | | 13,519 | | ▲16.61 |
| HPU hold | | Swing | ▼11.16 | |

=== Assembly Election 1988 ===
1988 Meghalaya Legislative Assembly election: Laban
| Party | Candidate | Votes | % | ±% |
|---|---|---|---|---|
| HPU | Anthony Lyngdoh | 3,964 | 50.63% | New |
| INC | Bhaskar Choudhary | 3,026 | 38.65% | ▼1.26 |
| CPI | J. Lanong | 252 | 3.22% | ▼5.85 |
| HSPDP | K. S. Swer | 245 | 3.13% | ▲1.08 |
| PDC | Hoster Diengdoh | 240 | 3.07% | New |
| Independent | Mrityunjoy Chakravarty | 82 | 1.05% | New |
| Independent | Mahmud Quamrul Ahsan | 21 | 0.27% | New |
| Margin of victory | | 938 | 11.98% | ▼2.20 |
| Turnout | | 7,830 | 69.22% | ▲1.00 |
| Registered electors | | 11,593 | | ▲18.94 |
| HPU gain from INC | | Swing | ▲10.72 | |

=== Assembly Election 1983 ===
1983 Meghalaya Legislative Assembly election: Laban
| Party | Candidate | Votes | % | ±% |
|---|---|---|---|---|
| INC | Bhaskar Choudhury | 2,588 | 39.90% | ▼3.90 |
| AHL | Garland Nonglait | 1,668 | 25.72% | ▼3.91 |
| Independent | Arthur P. Massar | 752 | 11.59% | New |
| CPI | Binoy Lahiri | 588 | 9.07% | New |
| Independent | Manas Choudhury | 372 | 5.74% | New |
| Independent | Hasibuddin Ahmed | 143 | 2.20% | New |
| HSPDP | Richard M. Toi | 133 | 2.05% | ▼7.02 |
| Margin of victory | | 920 | 14.18% | ▲0.02 |
| Turnout | | 6,486 | 69.96% | ▼1.31 |
| Registered electors | | 9,747 | | ▲49.93 |
| INC hold | | Swing | ▼3.90 | |

=== Assembly Election 1978 ===
1978 Meghalaya Legislative Assembly election: Laban
| Party | Candidate | Votes | % | ±% |
|---|---|---|---|---|
| INC | Bhaskar Choudhury | 1,932 | 43.80% | ▲2.41 |
| AHL | Rayland Singh Lyngdoh | 1,307 | 29.63% | New |
| HSPDP | Richard M. Toi | 400 | 9.07% | New |
| Independent | Korno Singh | 395 | 8.95% | New |
| INC(I) | Neena Rynjah | 238 | 5.40% | New |
| Independent | Motilal Diengdoh | 139 | 3.15% | New |
| Margin of victory | | 625 | 14.17% | ▲1.45 |
| Turnout | | 4,411 | 70.10% | ▲13.40 |
| Registered electors | | 6,501 | | ▼14.22 |
| INC hold | | Swing | ▲2.41 | |

=== Assembly Election 1972 ===
1972 Meghalaya Legislative Assembly election: Laban
| Party | Candidate | Votes | % | ±% |
|---|---|---|---|---|
| INC | Parsvanath Choudhury | 1,708 | 41.39% | New |
| Independent | Muriel Selma Dunn | 1,183 | 28.66% | New |
| Independent | Dr. Subrata Das | 746 | 18.08% | New |
| Independent | Hasting Kharkongor | 490 | 11.87% | New |
| Margin of victory | | 525 | 12.72% | |
| Turnout | | 4,127 | 56.26% | |
| Registered electors | | 7,579 | | |
| INC win (new seat) | | | | |
