= Pariong Assembly constituency =

Constituency of the Meghalaya legislative assembly in India

Pariong
- Former constituency for the Meghalaya Legislative Assembly

Constituency details
- Country: India
- Region: Northeast India
- State: Meghalaya
- Established: 1972
- Abolished: 2013
- Total electors: 17,534

Pariong Assembly constituency was an assembly constituency in the India state of Meghalaya.

== Members of the Legislative Assembly ==
Election	Member	Party
1972	Hopingstone Lyngdoh	Independent politician
1978	Tubarlin Lyngdoh	Hill State People's Democratic Party
1983	Tubarlin Lyngdoh	Hill State People's Democratic Party
1988	Hopingstone Lyngdoh	Hill State People's Democratic Party
1993	Tubarlin Lyngdoh	Hill State People's Democratic Party
1998	Tubarlin Lyngdoh	Hill State People's Democratic Party
2003	Irin Lyngdoh	Indian National Congress
2008	Dr. Adviser Pariong	Hill State People's Democratic Party

== Election results ==
=== Assembly Election 2008 ===
2008 Meghalaya Legislative Assembly election: Pariong
Party	Candidate	Votes	%	±%
HSPDP	Dr. Adviser Pariong	8,225	50.18%	▲14.46
INC	Irin Lyngdoh	7,199	43.92%	▲7.97
UDP	Lam Lyngdoh	526	3.21%	▼4.17
NCP	Ricardus Iawphniaw	308	1.88%	▼0.41
LJP	Sranly Marwein	134	0.82%	New
Margin of victory		1,026	6.26%	▲6.02
Turnout		16,392	93.49%	▲22.03
Registered electors		17,534		▲1.75
HSPDP gain from INC		Swing	▲14.23	

=== Assembly Election 2003 ===
2003 Meghalaya Legislative Assembly election: Pariong
Party	Candidate	Votes	%	±%
INC	Irin Lyngdoh	4,427	35.95%	▲15.80
HSPDP	Tubarlin Lyngdoh	4,398	35.71%	▼18.78
KHNAM	Manhun Thabah	1,157	9.40%	New
UDP	Manstanry Kharsyntiew	909	7.38%	▼3.34
BJP	Komlin Lawriniang	821	6.67%	▲5.51
MDP	Shanborlin Lyngdoh Nonglait	321	2.61%	New
NCP	Kwental Ryngad	282	2.29%	New
Margin of victory		29	0.24%	▼34.12
Turnout		12,315	71.47%	▼1.51
Registered electors		17,233		▲7.19
INC gain from HSPDP		Swing	▼18.55	

=== Assembly Election 1998 ===
1998 Meghalaya Legislative Assembly election: Pariong
Party	Candidate	Votes	%	±%
HSPDP	Tubarlin Lyngdoh	6,393	54.50%	▼8.91
INC	Ricardus Iawphniaw	2,363	20.14%	▼12.90
PDM	D. Rockyer L. Nonglait	1,581	13.48%	New
UDP	Queentina Diengdoh	1,258	10.72%	New
BJP	Endro Iawphniaw	136	1.16%	▼2.38
Margin of victory		4,030	34.35%	▲3.99
Turnout		11,731	74.57%	▼2.47
Registered electors		16,077		▲3.30
HSPDP hold		Swing	▼8.91	

=== Assembly Election 1993 ===
1993 Meghalaya Legislative Assembly election: Pariong
Party	Candidate	Votes	%	±%
HSPDP	Tubarlin Lyngdoh	7,445	63.41%	▼6.74
INC	D. Rockyer L. Nonglait	3,880	33.05%	▲10.97
BJP	D. Darius Lyngkhoi	416	3.54%	New
Margin of victory		3,565	30.36%	▼17.72
Turnout		11,741	76.43%	▲3.70
Registered electors		15,564		▲21.71
HSPDP hold		Swing		

=== Assembly Election 1988 ===
1988 Meghalaya Legislative Assembly election: Pariong
Party	Candidate	Votes	%	±%
HSPDP	Hopingstone Lyngdoh	6,436	70.15%	▲12.35
INC	D. Darius Lyngkhoi	2,025	22.07%	▲14.86
HPU	S. E. Lyngkhoi	554	6.04%	New
Independent	Thomline Caller Marngar	159	1.73%	New
Margin of victory		4,411	48.08%	▲19.97
Turnout		9,174	73.56%	▲10.94
Registered electors		12,788		▲14.43
HSPDP hold		Swing	▲12.35	

=== Assembly Election 1983 ===
1983 Meghalaya Legislative Assembly election: Pariong
Party	Candidate	Votes	%	±%
HSPDP	Tubarlin Lyngdoh	3,927	57.80%	▼14.60
AHL	B. Phrinlington Marngar	2,017	29.69%	▲20.53
INC	Bhatiar Singh Syiem	490	7.21%	▼11.23
PDC	Bricksius Marwein	225	3.31%	New
Independent	Osarly Wahlang	135	1.99%	New
Margin of victory		1,910	28.11%	▼25.85
Turnout		6,794	62.50%	▼5.85
Registered electors		11,175		▲9.80
HSPDP hold		Swing	▼14.60	

=== Assembly Election 1978 ===
1978 Meghalaya Legislative Assembly election: Pariong
Party	Candidate	Votes	%	±%
HSPDP	Tubarlin Lyngdoh	4,911	72.40%	New
INC	Mak Thongni	1,251	18.44%	New
AHL	B. Phrinlington Marngar	621	9.16%	▼2.29
Margin of victory		3,660	53.96%	▲0.17
Turnout		6,783	67.77%	▲3.29
Registered electors		10,178		▲57.99
HSPDP gain from Independent		Swing		

=== Assembly Election 1972 ===
1972 Meghalaya Legislative Assembly election: Pariong
Party	Candidate	Votes	%	±%
Independent	Hopingstone Lyngdoh	2,890	70.82%	New
Independent	Mak Uhongni	695	17.03%	New
AHL	Loberndri Hoojon	467	11.44%	New
Independent	Stanley Lyngdoh	29	0.71%	New
Margin of victory		2,195	53.79%	
Turnout		4,081	64.82%	
Registered electors		6,442		
Independent win (new seat)				
