= 1993 Meghalaya Legislative Assembly election =

- 19 February 1993

All 60 seats in the Meghalaya Legislative Assembly 31 seats needed for a majority
- Turnout: 79.52%
	First party	Second party
	INC	HPU
Party	INC	HPU
Seats before	22	19
Seats won	24	11
Seat change	2 ▲	8 ▼
CM before election
D. D. Lapang
INC
Elected CM
S. C. Marak
INC

The 1993 Meghalaya Legislative Assembly election was held on 19 February 1993.

Following the election a coalition government called the Meghalaya United Front was formed between the Indian National Congress and a split from the Hill State People's Democratic Party, the All Party Hill Leaders Conference (Armison Marak Group) and several independents. S. C. Marak was elected as Chief Minister.

== Results ==
← Summary of the 19 February 1993 Meghalaya Legislative Assembly election results →
Parties and coalitions	Popular vote			Seats	
Parties and coalitions	Votes	%	±pp	Won	+/−
Indian National Congress (INC)	282,139	34.62	1.97 ▲	24	2 ▲
Hill People's Union (HPU)	175,487	21.53	5.31 ▼	11	8 ▼
Hill State People's Democratic Party (HDP)	79,824	9.8	2.88 ▼	8	2 ▲
All Party Hill Leaders Conference (Armison Marak Group)	64,603	7.93	3.25 ▲	3	1 ▲
Bharatiya Janata Party (BJP)	29,948	3.68		0	
Meghalaya Progressive People's Party (MPPP)	20,117	2.47		2	
Public Demands Implementation Convention (PDIC)	17,423	2.14	1.06 ▼	2	Steady
Janata Dal (B)	2,586	0.32		0	
Communist Party of India (CPI)	1,138	0.14	0.22 ▼	0	Steady
Janata Party	841	0.1		0	
Independents (IND)	140,793	17.28	2.31 ▼	10	1 ▲
Total	814,899	100.00		60	±0
Source: Election Commission of India

== Elected members ==
Winner, runner-up, voter turnout, and victory margin in every constituency
Assembly Constituency		Turnout	Winner				Runner Up				Margin
#k	Names	%	Candidate	Party	Votes	%	Candidate	Party	Votes	%	Margin
1	War-Jaintia	82.8%	Johndeng Pohrmen	INC	6,349	39.1%	H. Enowell Poshna	HSPDP	4,956	30.52%	1,393
2	Rymbai	86.78%	Simon Siangshai	HPU	12,814	51.59%	Obil Kyndait	AHL(AM)	7,218	29.06%	5,596
3	Sutnga-Shangpung	82.16%	Oliverneat Chyrmang	HPU	7,059	45.71%	Onward Leyswell Nongtdu	INC	5,990	38.79%	1,069
4	Raliang	88.94%	Mihsalan Suchiang	HPU	10,160	50.25%	Herbert Suchiang	INC	10,059	49.75%	101
5	Nartiang	85.91%	Henry Lamin	AHL(AM)	6,037	33.61%	H. Britainwar Dan	INC	5,396	30.04%	641
6	Nongbah-Wahiajer	92.83%	Edmund Speakerson Lyngdoh	HSPDP	8,114	43.03%	Kyrmen Susngi	INC	7,711	40.9%	403
7	Jowai	84.81%	Roytre Christopher Laloo	INC	7,572	43.41%	Singh Mulieh	Independent	5,692	32.63%	1,880
8	Mawhati	84.81%	S. R. Moksha	HPU	5,013	38.45%	Rangkynsai Makdoh	INC	4,775	36.62%	238
9	Umroi	84.95%	E. K. Mawlong	HSPDP	7,958	48.29%	Fleming Lapang	INC	7,072	42.92%	886
10	Nongpoh	82.4%	Constantine Lyngdoh	HSPDP	7,474	53.54%	Donwa Dethwelson Lapang	INC	6,379	45.7%	1,095
11	Jirang	74.34%	J. Dringwell Rymbai	INC	5,998	48.43%	Michael Giri Dkhar	HPU	3,769	30.43%	2,229
12	Mairang	85.11%	Kitdor Syiem	INC	8,910	53.94%	Fuller Lyngdoh Mawnai	HSPDP	5,639	34.14%	3,271
13	Nongspung	86.61%	S. Loniak Marbaniang	HSPDP	5,706	37.18%	John Anthony Lyngdoh	INC	4,074	26.55%	1,632
14	Sohiong	83.52%	H. Donkupar R. Lyngdoh	HSPDP	10,097	56.76%	Rain Augustine Lyngdoh	INC	6,780	38.12%	3,317
15	Mylliem	81.47%	Pynshai Manik Syiem	AHL(AM)	8,063	55.5%	Oris Lyngdoh	INC	3,754	25.84%	4,309
16	Malki-Nongthymmai	62.21%	Tony Curtis Lyngdoh	INC	4,238	35.53%	Bindo Lanong	HPU	4,059	34.03%	179
17	Laitumkhrah	62.85%	Justin Khonglah	HPU	3,697	35.69%	George M. War	INC	3,055	29.49%	642
18	Pynthorumkhrah	69.14%	James Marvin Pariat	INC	6,368	44.99%	Brama Prakash	BJP	3,786	26.75%	2,582
19	Jaiaw	68.44%	A. H. Scott Lyngdoh	HPU	6,346	57.21%	Martamlin Pyrbot	BJP	2,510	22.63%	3,836
20	Mawkhar	69.7%	Roshan Warjri	HPU	3,406	49.05%	Dr. Friday Lyngdoh	INC	2,834	40.81%	572
21	Mawprem	66.6%	Dhrubanath Joshi	INC	3,062	31.68%	H. Aiontis Roy Kharphuli	BJP	2,563	26.52%	499
22	Laban	70.66%	Anthony Lyngdoh	HPU	3,698	39.47%	Thrang Hok Rangad	BJP	2,907	31.02%	791
23	Mawlai	73.99%	S. D. Khongwir	HPU	6,291	37.98%	Founder Strong Cajee	Independent	4,770	28.8%	1,521
24	Sohryngkham	82.51%	Sanbor Swell Lyngdoh	PDC	4,967	37.1%	Dapmain Khyriemmujat	AHL(AM)	3,536	26.41%	1,431
25	Dienglieng	78.78%	Martle N Mukhim	PDC	7,508	56.63%	Medister Warbah	INC	5,751	43.37%	1,757
26	Nongkrem	84.06%	H. S. Shylla	AHL(AM)	4,970	32.94%	Robert Kharshing	HPU	4,685	31.05%	285
27	Langkyrdem	73.13%	Brington Buhai Lyngdoh	HPU	7,989	60.52%	Dominic Roblin Nongkynrih	INC	5,212	39.48%	2,777
28	Nongshken	77.97%	Ganold Stone Massar	HPU	4,897	44.46%	Khan Khong Dkhar	INC	4,852	44.05%	45
29	Sohra	76.26%	Dr. Flinder Anderson Khonglam	Independent	4,731	39.95%	S. Phaindrojen Swer	HPU	3,459	29.21%	1,272
30	Shella	70.02%	Dr. Donkupar Roy	Independent	3,905	38.88%	G. Granderson Syemlieh	INC	3,163	31.49%	742
31	Mawsynram	78.78%	Mestonnath Kharchandy	INC	4,331	34.35%	D. Plaslanding Iangjuh	Independent	4,143	32.86%	188
32	Mawkyrwat	81.12%	Rowell Lyngdoh	INC	4,993	34.97%	B. Bires Nongsiej	HPU	4,755	33.3%	238
33	Pariong	76.43%	Tubarlin Lyngdoh	HSPDP	7,445	63.41%	D. Rockyer L. Nonglait	INC	3,880	33.05%	3,565
34	Nongstoin	66.97%	Hopingstone Lyngdoh	HSPDP	8,644	45.12%	Francis K. Mawlot	Independent	5,511	28.77%	3,133
35	Langrin	81.25%	Probin K. Raswai	INC	8,362	58.66%	Bakstarwell Wanniang	HPU	5,422	38.04%	2,940
36	Mawthengkut	80.07%	H. Ledishon Nongsiang	HSPDP	6,698	44.78%	Maysalin War	INC	6,645	44.43%	53
37	Baghmara	81.16%	Lotsing A. Sangma	INC	6,386	52.87%	Sengran M. Sangma	HPU	5,692	47.13%	694
38	Rongrenggiri	74.07%	Projend D. Sangma	Independent	4,151	26.23%	Albinstone M. Sangma	INC	3,709	23.43%	442
39	Rongjeng	77.32%	Swajit Sangma	Independent	5,006	46.75%	Pleander G. Momin	INC	3,502	32.7%	1,504
40	Kharkutta	75.47%	Elstone D. Marak	Independent	3,207	28.37%	Luderberg Ch. Momin	HPU	2,969	26.26%	238
41	Mendipathar	81.65%	Frankenstein W. Momin	INC	6,969	49.92%	Beninstand G. Momin	HPU	6,195	44.37%	774
42	Resubelpara	77.47%	Salseng C. Marak	INC	7,538	65.26%	Nablune G. Momin	HPU	4,013	34.74%	3,525
43	Songsak	75.79%	Tonsing N Marak	INC	5,105	49.31%	Rockefeller G. Momin	AHL(AM)	2,713	26.2%	2,392
44	Bajengdoba	79.85%	Chamberline B. Marak	INC	6,555	58.14%	Johan Manner Marak	HPU	3,137	27.82%	3,418
45	Tikrikilla	88.64%	Monindra Rava	MPPP	4,661	36.46%	Pillarson G. Momin	HPU	4,495	35.16%	166
46	Dadenggre	79.55%	Augustine D.Marak	Independent	4,399	29.81%	Norwin B. Sangma	INC	4,354	29.51%	45
47	Rongchugiri	87.42%	Backstar Sangma	Independent	6,806	66.77%	Sherjee H. Sangma	INC	3,029	29.72%	3,777
48	Phulbari	88.34%	Manirul Islam Sarkar	Independent	4,175	26.7%	A. Kramoz Zaman	INC	3,376	21.59%	799
49	Rajabala	89.39%	Sayeedullah Nongrum	Independent	6,225	41.14%	Biren Hajong	BJP	3,831	25.32%	2,394
50	Selsella	85.78%	Atul C. Marak	INC	4,823	47.98%	Barthar Marak	HPU	4,416	43.93%	407
51	Rongram	80.11%	Mathrona Marak	INC	3,017	24.02%	Godwin D. Shira	MPPP	2,847	22.67%	170
52	Tura	65.5%	Joylange Momin	INC	8,617	48.55%	Enila Shira	BJP	2,972	16.74%	5,645
53	Chokpot	77.31%	Masonsing Sangma	INC	4,582	45.8%	Clifford R. Marak	HPU	3,138	31.37%	1,444
54	Kherapara	84.51%	Brening Sangma	INC	3,546	29.79%	Chamberlin R. Marak	HPU	1,883	15.82%	1,663
55	Dalu	83.15%	Archibold A. Sangma	INC	4,631	44.79%	Nityanarayan Smchang	AHL(AM)	2,624	25.38%	2,007
56	Dalamgiri	84.89%	Admiral K. Sangma	INC	3,748	35.85%	Semford Sangma	Independent	3,666	35.06%	82
57	Rangsakona	85.1%	Adolf Lu Hitler Marak	INC	5,474	49.17%	Chesterfield Marak	MPPP	2,879	25.86%	2,595
58	Ampatigiri	86.92%	Dr. Mukul Sangma	Independent	4,015	27.51%	Momendro Agitok	HPU	3,726	25.53%	289
59	Salmanpara	81.41%	Gopinath Sangma	INC	4,898	40.19%	Nimarson Momin	Independent	4,474	36.71%	424
60	Mahendraganj	89.21%	Lok Kindor Hajong	MPPP	2,932	23.61%	Dhabal Chandra Barman	INC	2,630	21.18%	302
