= Rymbai Assembly constituency =

Constituency of the Meghalaya legislative assembly in India

Rymbai
- Former constituency for the Meghalaya Legislative Assembly

Constituency details
- Country: India
- Region: Northeast India
- State: Meghalaya
- Established: 1972
- Abolished: 2013
- Total electors: 29,659

Rymbai Assembly constituency was an assembly constituency in the India state of Meghalaya.

== Members of the Legislative Assembly ==
Election	Member	Party
1972	Lewis Bareh	Independent politician
1978	Obil Kyndait	Hill State People's Democratic Party
1983	Nihon Ksih	All Party Hill Leaders Conference
1988	Simon Siangshai	Independent politician
1993	Simon Siangshai	Hill People's Union
1998	Simon Siangshai	United Democratic Party
2003	Nehlang Lyngdoh	Indian National Congress
2008	Nehlang Lyngdoh	Indian National Congress

== Election results ==
=== Assembly Election 2008 ===
2008 Meghalaya Legislative Assembly election: Rymbai
Party	Candidate	Votes	%	±%
INC	Nehlang Lyngdoh	12,893	47.90%	▲1.01
NCP	Simon Siangshai	5,856	21.76%	▼0.76
HSPDP	Obil Kyndait	3,853	14.32%	New
KHNAM	Tariang Massar	2,332	8.66%	New
UDP	Balios Swer	1,980	7.36%	New
Margin of victory		7,037	26.15%	▲9.83
Turnout		26,914	90.74%	▲10.55
Registered electors		29,659		▼8.75
INC hold		Swing	▲1.01	

=== Assembly Election 2003 ===
2003 Meghalaya Legislative Assembly election: Rymbai
Party	Candidate	Votes	%	±%
INC	Nehlang Lyngdoh	12,224	46.90%	▲19.97
Independent	Obil Kyndait	7,972	30.58%	New
NCP	Simon Siangshai	5,870	22.52%	New
Margin of victory		4,252	16.31%	▲14.97
Turnout		26,066	80.20%	▼7.45
Registered electors		32,502		▲14.12
INC gain from UDP		Swing	▲9.69	

=== Assembly Election 1998 ===
1998 Meghalaya Legislative Assembly election: Rymbai
Party	Candidate	Votes	%	±%
UDP	Simon Siangshai	9,287	37.20%	New
PDM	Obil Kyndait	8,953	35.87%	New
INC	Dorinroy Ksih	6,722	26.93%	▲16.29
Margin of victory		334	1.34%	▼21.19
Turnout		24,962	89.33%	▲1.95
Registered electors		28,480		▼1.73
UDP gain from HPU		Swing		

=== Assembly Election 1993 ===
1993 Meghalaya Legislative Assembly election: Rymbai
Party	Candidate	Votes	%	±%
HPU	Simon Siangshai	12,814	51.59%	▲39.42
AHL(AM)	Obil Kyndait	7,218	29.06%	New
INC	Pharang Rymbai	2,643	10.64%	▲2.79
Independent	Corinth Swer	1,543	6.21%	New
Independent	Sawang Lamurong	351	1.41%	New
Independent	Dorinroy Ksih	269	1.08%	New
Margin of victory		5,596	22.53%	▲18.14
Turnout		24,838	86.78%	▼3.90
Registered electors		28,982		▲75.77
HPU gain from Independent		Swing	▲25.40	

=== Assembly Election 1988 ===
1988 Meghalaya Legislative Assembly election: Rymbai
Party	Candidate	Votes	%	±%
Independent	Simon Siangshai	3,869	26.19%	New
Independent	Obil Kyndiat	3,220	21.79%	New
HSPDP	Comforter Dkhar	2,865	19.39%	▲15.79
HPU	H. Attlee Singh Syih	1,798	12.17%	New
Independent	Pearlyone Rymbai	1,438	9.73%	New
INC	Nihon Ksih	1,160	7.85%	▼23.73
Independent	Dorinroy Ksih	425	2.88%	New
Margin of victory		649	4.39%	▼1.03
Turnout		14,775	91.66%	▲16.39
Registered electors		16,489		▲7.46
Independent gain from AHL		Swing	▼10.81	

=== Assembly Election 1983 ===
1983 Meghalaya Legislative Assembly election: Rymbai
Party	Candidate	Votes	%	±%
AHL	Nihon Ksih	4,157	37.00%	▲20.73
INC	Obil Kyndait	3,548	31.58%	▲0.45
Independent	Pearlyone Rymbai	2,365	21.05%	New
PDC	Ephrin Barch	760	6.76%	New
HSPDP	Dorinroy Ksih	405	3.60%	▼31.18
Margin of victory		609	5.42%	▲1.77
Turnout		11,235	76.45%	▼2.47
Registered electors		15,345		▲26.51
AHL gain from HSPDP		Swing	▲2.22	

=== Assembly Election 1978 ===
1978 Meghalaya Legislative Assembly election: Rymbai
Party	Candidate	Votes	%	±%
HSPDP	Obil Kyndait	3,193	34.78%	New
INC	Nihon Ksih	2,858	31.13%	New
AHL	Dorinroy Ksih	1,494	16.27%	▼27.13
Independent	Corinth Swer	1,407	15.33%	New
Independent	Braveman Mukhim	228	2.48%	New
Margin of victory		335	3.65%	▼9.55
Turnout		9,180	77.34%	▲3.62
Registered electors		12,129		▲39.16
HSPDP gain from Independent		Swing	▼21.82	

=== Assembly Election 1972 ===
1972 Meghalaya Legislative Assembly election: Rymbai
Party	Candidate	Votes	%	±%
Independent	Lewis Bareh	3,555	56.60%	New
AHL	Nihon Ksih	2,726	43.40%	New
Margin of victory		829	13.20%	
Turnout		6,281	73.97%	
Registered electors		8,716		
Independent win (new seat)				
