= Nongshken Assembly constituency =

Constituency of the Meghalaya legislative assembly in India

Nongshken
- Former constituency for the Meghalaya Legislative Assembly

Constituency details
- Country: India
- Region: Northeast India
- State: Meghalaya
- Established: 1972
- Abolished: 2013
- Total electors: 15,840

Nongshken Assembly constituency was an assembly constituency in the India state of Meghalaya.

== Members of the Legislative Assembly ==
Election	Member	Party
1972	Darwin D Pugh	All Party Hill Leaders Conference
1978	Maham Singh	Indian National Congress
1983	Ganold Stone Massar	Hill State People's Democratic Party
1988	Ganold Stone Massar	Hill People's Union
1993	Ganold Stone Massar	Hill People's Union
1998	Khan Khong Dkhar	Indian National Congress
2003	Khan Khong Dkhar	Indian National Congress
2008	Don Kupar Massar	Independent politician

== Election results ==
=== Assembly Election 2008 ===
2008 Meghalaya Legislative Assembly election: Nongshken
Party	Candidate	Votes	%	±%
Independent	Don Kupar Massar	5,522	37.86%	New
INC	Khan Khong Dkhar	4,550	31.19%	▼4.79
UDP	N. Beliris Kharduia	2,624	17.99%	▲2.84
NCP	Nicholas Pohlong	1,891	12.96%	New
Margin of victory		972	6.66%	▼2.28
Turnout		14,587	92.09%	▲19.84
Registered electors		15,840		▼2.76
Independent gain from INC		Swing	▲1.87	

=== Assembly Election 2003 ===
2003 Meghalaya Legislative Assembly election: Nongshken
Party	Candidate	Votes	%	±%
INC	Khan Khong Dkhar	4,235	35.98%	▼11.31
KHNAM	Ganold Stone Massar	3,182	27.04%	New
Independent	Monarch Shabong	1,858	15.79%	New
UDP	N. Beliris Kharduia	1,783	15.15%	▼29.93
BJP	Saindurlang Iawim	412	3.50%	▲0.29
HSPDP	Premier Sing Khongbeh	171	1.45%	New
Samata Party	S. Tipsngi Laso	128	1.09%	New
Margin of victory		1,053	8.95%	▲6.73
Turnout		11,769	72.29%	▲0.75
Registered electors		16,289		▲3.38
INC hold		Swing	▼11.31	

=== Assembly Election 1998 ===
1998 Meghalaya Legislative Assembly election: Nongshken
Party	Candidate	Votes	%	±%
INC	Khan Khong Dkhar	5,329	47.30%	▲3.25
UDP	Ganold Stone Massar	5,079	45.08%	New
PDM	Welborn Mawkhlieng	497	4.41%	New
BJP	S. Tipsngi Laso	362	3.21%	New
Margin of victory		250	2.22%	▲1.81
Turnout		11,267	73.17%	▼5.35
Registered electors		15,757		▲9.94
INC gain from HPU		Swing	▲2.84	

=== Assembly Election 1993 ===
1993 Meghalaya Legislative Assembly election: Nongshken
Party	Candidate	Votes	%	±%
HPU	Ganold Stone Massar	4,897	44.46%	▼2.99
INC	Khan Khong Dkhar	4,852	44.05%	▲18.90
Independent	S. Tipsngi Laso	469	4.26%	New
AHL(AM)	Ioanis L. Mawlong	464	4.21%	New
Independent	Welborn Mawkhlieng	305	2.77%	New
Independent	Rostonath Khongtyngkut	28	0.25%	New
Margin of victory		45	0.41%	▼21.89
Turnout		11,015	77.97%	▲5.21
Registered electors		14,333		▲17.73
HPU hold		Swing	▼2.99	

=== Assembly Election 1988 ===
1988 Meghalaya Legislative Assembly election: Nongshken
Party	Candidate	Votes	%	±%
HPU	Ganold Stone Massar	4,138	47.45%	New
INC	S. Dkhar	2,193	25.15%	▼4.52
HSPDP	S. Tariang	1,291	14.80%	▼23.28
Independent	Khan Khong Dkhar	1,099	12.60%	New
Margin of victory		1,945	22.30%	▲13.89
Turnout		8,721	73.28%	▼2.83
Registered electors		12,174		▲18.02
HPU gain from HSPDP		Swing	▲9.37	

=== Assembly Election 1983 ===
1983 Meghalaya Legislative Assembly election: Nongshken
Party	Candidate	Votes	%	±%
HSPDP	Ganold Stone Massar	2,925	38.08%	▲4.97
INC	Maham Singh	2,279	29.67%	▼3.61
AHL	Stauley D. D. Nichols Roy	2,073	26.99%	▼3.55
Independent	Luisa Brosila Lamin	404	5.26%	New
Margin of victory		646	8.41%	▲8.23
Turnout		7,681	76.87%	▲10.04
Registered electors		10,315		▲6.86
HSPDP gain from INC		Swing	▲4.80	

=== Assembly Election 1978 ===
1978 Meghalaya Legislative Assembly election: Nongshken
Party	Candidate	Votes	%	±%
INC	Maham Singh	2,070	33.29%	New
HSPDP	Ganoldstone Massar	2,059	33.11%	New
AHL	Galystone Laloo	1,899	30.54%	▼20.52
Independent	Kiwell Ryngksai	191	3.07%	New
Margin of victory		11	0.18%	▼15.48
Turnout		6,219	66.17%	▲13.46
Registered electors		9,653		▲19.04
INC gain from AHL		Swing	▼17.77	

=== Assembly Election 1972 ===
1972 Meghalaya Legislative Assembly election: Nongshken
Party	Candidate	Votes	%	±%
AHL	Darwin D Pugh	2,110	51.05%	New
Independent	Luisa Brosila Lamin	1,463	35.40%	New
Independent	M Bhathan Singh Nongsteng	544	13.16%	New
Independent	Pilat Khongkliam	16	0.39%	New
Margin of victory		647	15.65%	
Turnout		4,133	51.77%	
Registered electors		8,109		
AHL win (new seat)				
