= Nongspung Assembly constituency =

Constituency of the Meghalaya legislative assembly in India

Nongspung
- Former constituency for the Meghalaya Legislative Assembly

Constituency details
- Country: India
- Region: Northeast India
- State: Meghalaya
- Established: 1972
- Abolished: 2013
- Total electors: 20,547

Nongspung Assembly constituency was an assembly constituency in the India state of Meghalaya.

== Members of the Legislative Assembly ==
Election	Member	Party
1972	Winstone Syiemiong	Independent politician
1978	Winstone Syiemiong	Hill State People's Democratic Party
1983	Winstone Syiemiong	Hill State People's Democratic Party
1988	S. Loniak Marbaniang	Hill State People's Democratic Party
1993	S. Loniak Marbaniang	Hill State People's Democratic Party
1998	John Anthony Lyngdoh	United Democratic Party
2003	John Anthony Lyngdoh	United Democratic Party
2008	J. Antonius Lyngdoh	United Democratic Party

== Election results ==
=== Assembly Election 2008 ===
2008 Meghalaya Legislative Assembly election: Nongspung
Party	Candidate	Votes	%	±%
UDP	J. Antonius Lyngdoh	7,896	41.79%	▼2.13
INC	Kennedy Cornelius Khyriem	7,149	37.84%	▲30.70
HSPDP	Wenton Marbaniang	2,190	11.59%	▼19.22
NCP	Jimmy Thompson L. Nonglait	1,381	7.31%	▼7.24
LJP	Aidalis Ranee	184	0.97%	New
CPI	Fasterwell Marbaniang	95	0.50%	New
Margin of victory		747	3.95%	▼9.15
Turnout		18,895	91.96%	▲21.94
Registered electors		20,547		▼10.22
UDP hold		Swing	▼2.13	

=== Assembly Election 2003 ===
2003 Meghalaya Legislative Assembly election: Nongspung
Party	Candidate	Votes	%	±%
UDP	John Anthony Lyngdoh	7,037	43.92%	▲5.65
HSPDP	S. Loniak Marbaniang	4,937	30.81%	▲1.47
NCP	Winstone Syiemiong	2,332	14.55%	New
INC	Srolon Lyngdoh Lyngkhoi	1,144	7.14%	▼23.41
MDP	Wenton Marbaniang	210	1.31%	New
KHNAM	Bashu S. Marbaniang	183	1.14%	New
Khasi Farmers Democratic Party	Firstarwell M.Baniang	181	1.13%	New
Margin of victory		2,100	13.11%	▲5.39
Turnout		16,024	70.02%	▼6.05
Registered electors		22,886		▲8.70
UDP hold		Swing	▲5.65	

=== Assembly Election 1998 ===
1998 Meghalaya Legislative Assembly election: Nongspung
Party	Candidate	Votes	%	±%
UDP	John Anthony Lyngdoh	6,128	38.26%	New
INC	S. Loniak Marbaniang	4,892	30.54%	▲4.00
HSPDP	Winstone Syiemiong	4,699	29.34%	▼7.84
CPI	Jied Kharbteng	211	1.32%	▼3.62
BJP	Michael Warjri	86	0.54%	New
Margin of victory		1,236	7.72%	▼2.92
Turnout		16,016	77.85%	▼8.71
Registered electors		21,054		▲16.31
UDP gain from HSPDP		Swing	▲1.08	

=== Assembly Election 1993 ===
1993 Meghalaya Legislative Assembly election: Nongspung
Party	Candidate	Votes	%	±%
HSPDP	S. Loniak Marbaniang	5,706	37.18%	▲1.42
INC	John Anthony Lyngdoh	4,074	26.55%	▲4.29
Independent	Winstone Syiemiong	3,741	24.38%	New
Independent	Nit Shabong	810	5.28%	New
CPI	Fasterwell Marbaniang	757	4.93%	▲2.70
Independent	Danial S. Lyngdoh	258	1.68%	New
Margin of victory		1,632	10.63%	▲8.73
Turnout		15,346	86.61%	▲4.08
Registered electors		18,101		▲26.83
HSPDP hold		Swing	▲1.42	

=== Assembly Election 1988 ===
1988 Meghalaya Legislative Assembly election: Nongspung
Party	Candidate	Votes	%	±%
HSPDP	S. Loniak Marbaniang	4,119	35.76%	▼20.39
HPU	Winstone Syiemiong	3,900	33.86%	New
INC	John Anthony Lyngdoh	2,563	22.25%	▲6.38
Independent	Blarsing Kurbah	678	5.89%	New
CPI	Fasterwell Marbaniang	257	2.23%	New
Margin of victory		219	1.90%	▼35.37
Turnout		11,517	82.85%	▲7.05
Registered electors		14,272		▲22.33
HSPDP hold		Swing	▼20.39	

=== Assembly Election 1983 ===
1983 Meghalaya Legislative Assembly election: Nongspung
Party	Candidate	Votes	%	±%
HSPDP	Winstone Syiemiong	4,825	56.16%	▼5.91
Independent	Hershon Marbaniang	1,623	18.89%	New
INC	Syrtok Singh Nongrum	1,364	15.88%	▲5.40
PDC	Michael Warjri	780	9.08%	New
Margin of victory		3,202	37.27%	▼1.11
Turnout		8,592	77.21%	▼0.25
Registered electors		11,667		▲7.27
HSPDP hold		Swing	▼5.91	

=== Assembly Election 1978 ===
1978 Meghalaya Legislative Assembly election: Nongspung
Party	Candidate	Votes	%	±%
HSPDP	Winstone Syiemiong	4,988	62.06%	New
AHL	Horishon Lyngdoh B.	1,904	23.69%	▲7.08
INC	Dominik Darflynson Lyngdoh	842	10.48%	New
Independent	Benedict Lyngkhoi	303	3.77%	New
Margin of victory		3,084	38.37%	▼4.62
Turnout		8,037	75.63%	▲29.20
Registered electors		10,876		▲65.46
HSPDP gain from Independent		Swing	▲2.46	

=== Assembly Election 1972 ===
1972 Meghalaya Legislative Assembly election: Nongspung
Party	Candidate	Votes	%	±%
Independent	Winstone Syiemiong	1,751	59.60%	New
AHL	Kwing Drolin Shangdiar	488	16.61%	New
Independent	Dominik Darflynson Lyngdoh	477	16.24%	New
Independent	Prestar Kharmih	222	7.56%	New
Margin of victory		1,263	42.99%	
Turnout		2,938	46.66%	
Registered electors		6,573		
Independent win (new seat)				
