= Nongbah-Wahiajer Assembly constituency =

Constituency of the Meghalaya legislative assembly in India

Nongbah-Wahiajer
- Former constituency for the Meghalaya Legislative Assembly

Constituency details
- Country: India
- Region: Northeast India
- State: Meghalaya
- Established: 1978
- Abolished: 2013
- Total electors: 21,661

Nongbah-Wahiajer Assembly constituency was an assembly constituency in the India state of Meghalaya.

== Members of the Legislative Assembly ==
Election	Member	Party
1978	Albin Lamare	All Party Hill Leaders Conference
1983	Indro Pariat	Hill State People's Democratic Party
1988	Kyrmen Susngi	Independent politician
1993	Edmund Speakerson Lyngdoh	Hill State People's Democratic Party
1998	Kyrmen Susngi	United Democratic Party
2003	Kyrmen Susngi	United Democratic Party
2008	Sniawbhalang Dhar	Indian National Congress

== Election results ==
=== Assembly Election 2008 ===
2008 Meghalaya Legislative Assembly election: Nongbah-Wahiajer
Party	Candidate	Votes	%	±%
INC	Sniawbhalang Dhar	8,452	40.94%	▼2.98
UDP	Thawain Plain	6,973	33.78%	▼20.06
MDP	Edmund Speakerson Lyngdoh	5,119	24.80%	New
HSPDP	Darling Wavel Lamare	101	0.49%	▼0.39
Margin of victory		1,479	7.16%	▼2.75
Turnout		20,645	95.31%	▲15.75
Registered electors		21,661		▼4.02
INC gain from UDP		Swing	▼12.90	

=== Assembly Election 2003 ===
2003 Meghalaya Legislative Assembly election: Nongbah-Wahiajer
Party	Candidate	Votes	%	±%
UDP	Kyrmen Susngi	9,667	53.84%	▲1.60
INC	Edmund Speakerson Lyngdoh	7,886	43.92%	▲7.82
NCP	Laitsing Shilla	245	1.36%	New
HSPDP	Jylliew Roy Lamin	158	0.88%	▼0.66
Margin of victory		1,781	9.92%	▼6.22
Turnout		17,956	79.60%	▼1.95
Registered electors		22,569		▲8.13
UDP hold		Swing	▲1.60	

=== Assembly Election 1998 ===
1998 Meghalaya Legislative Assembly election: Nongbah-Wahiajer
Party	Candidate	Votes	%	±%
UDP	Kyrmen Susngi	8,887	52.24%	New
INC	Edmund Speakerson Lyngdoh	6,141	36.10%	▼4.80
Independent	Thawain Plain	1,723	10.13%	New
HSPDP	Jylliew Roy Lamin	262	1.54%	▼41.49
Margin of victory		2,746	16.14%	▲14.00
Turnout		17,013	82.89%	▼10.11
Registered electors		20,873		▲1.42
UDP gain from HSPDP		Swing	▲9.20	

=== Assembly Election 1993 ===
1993 Meghalaya Legislative Assembly election: Nongbah-Wahiajer
Party	Candidate	Votes	%	±%
HSPDP	Edmund Speakerson Lyngdoh	8,114	43.03%	▲17.01
INC	Kyrmen Susngi	7,711	40.90%	▲38.38
Independent	Lalitsingh Shylla	2,054	10.89%	New
AHL(AM)	Thyndajai Dkhar	976	5.18%	New
Margin of victory		403	2.14%	▲1.72
Turnout		18,855	92.83%	▲0.89
Registered electors		20,580		▲50.44
HSPDP gain from Independent		Swing	▲16.59	

=== Assembly Election 1988 ===
1988 Meghalaya Legislative Assembly election: Nongbah-Wahiajer
Party	Candidate	Votes	%	±%
Independent	Kyrmen Susngi	3,282	26.44%	New
HSPDP	Edmund Speakerson Lyngdoh	3,230	26.03%	▲1.61
Independent	Hari R. Sari	2,951	23.78%	New
HPU	Develin Talang	1,914	15.42%	New
INC	Indro Pariat	312	2.51%	▼1.26
PDC	Overlo Laloo	13	0.10%	New
Margin of victory		52	0.42%	▲0.07
Turnout		12,411	92.09%	▲15.83
Registered electors		13,680		▲15.79
Independent gain from HSPDP		Swing	▲2.03	

=== Assembly Election 1983 ===
1983 Meghalaya Legislative Assembly election: Nongbah-Wahiajer
Party	Candidate	Votes	%	±%
HSPDP	Indro Pariat	2,160	24.41%	▲11.08
AHL	Katsingh Thubru	2,129	24.06%	▼27.99
Independent	Hari R. Sari	1,702	19.24%	New
Independent	M. Jerveyliwin Garod	903	10.21%	New
Independent	S. Kmen Khonglah	885	10.00%	New
Independent	B. Blooming Shallam	674	7.62%	New
INC	E. R. W. Tariang	334	3.77%	▼17.28
Margin of victory		31	0.35%	▼30.65
Turnout		8,848	78.06%	▼3.03
Registered electors		11,814		▲13.42
HSPDP gain from AHL		Swing	▼27.64	

=== Assembly Election 1978 ===
1978 Meghalaya Legislative Assembly election: Nongbah-Wahiajer
Party	Candidate	Votes	%	±%
AHL	Albin Lamare	4,225	52.05%	New
INC	B. Blooming Shallam	1,709	21.05%	New
HSPDP	Watchington Sna	1,082	13.33%	New
Independent	Pollington Pyrtuh	601	7.40%	New
Independent	Indro Pariat	500	6.16%	New
Margin of victory		2,516	31.00%	
Turnout		8,117	79.32%	
Registered electors		10,416		
AHL win (new seat)				
