= 1983 Meghalaya Legislative Assembly election =

- 17 February 1983

All 60 seats in the Meghalaya Legislative Assembly 31 seats needed for a majority
- Turnout: 72.58%
	First party	Second party
	INC	APH
Party	INC	APHLC
Seats before	20	16
Seats won	25	15
Seat change	5 ▲	1 ▼
Popular vote	130,956	118,593
Percentage	27.68	24.92
Swing	1.64 ▼	0.15 ▲
Chief Minister before election
Williamson A. Sangma
INC
Elected Chief Minister
B. B. Lyngdoh
APHLC

The 1983 Meghalaya Legislative Assembly election was held on 17 February 1983. No party secured a majority of seats and no women were elected. A coalition named the Meghalaya United Parliamentary Party was formed by the All Party Hill Leaders Conference (AHL), the Hill State People's Democratic Party, the Public Demands Implementation Convention (PDIC) and two independent members. On 2 March 1983 the coalition presented B. B. Lyngdoh from AHL as Chief Minister. However, the coalition only lasted 29 days and on 2 April a new coalition, the Meghalaya Democratic Forum, was formed with the Indian National Congress (INC) in the lead. W. A. Sangma of the INC was appointed Chief Minister.

== Results ==
← Summary of the 17 February 1983 Meghalaya Legislative Assembly election results →
Parties and coalitions	Popular vote			Seats	
Parties and coalitions	Votes	%	±pp	Won	+/−
Indian National Congress (INC)	130,956	27.68	1.64 ▼	25	5 ▲
All Party Hill Leaders Conference (AHL)	118,593	24.92	0.15 ▲	15	1 ▼
Hill State People's Democratic Party (HDP)	91,386	19.32	0.08 ▲	15	1 ▲
Public Demands Implementation Convention (PDIC)	23,253	4.92		2	^{[a]}
Communist Party of India	2,442	0.52	0.1 ▼	0	Steady
Independents (IND)	106,378	22.49	2.33 ▼	3	5 ▼^{[b]}
Total	473,050	100.00		60	±0
Source: Election Commission of India

^{a} In the 1978 election, two candidates from the PDIC were elected, but the party had not obtained registration in time for the election; at that time, the party's representatives were recorded as independents in the official results.

^{b} Does not include the two PDIC candidates elected as independents in 1978.

== Elected members ==
Winner, runner-up, voter turnout, and victory margin in every constituency
Assembly Constituency		Turnout	Winner				Runner Up				Margin
#k	Names	%	Candidate	Party	Votes	%	Candidate	Party	Votes	%	Margin
1	Malki-Nongthymmai	65.59%	Bindo Lanong	APHLC	3,313	46.49%	Upstar Kharbuli	INC	2,298	2.46%	1,015
2	War-Jaintia	73.59%	H. Enowell Pohshna	Independent	3,399	34.14%	Johndeng Pohrmen	INC	3,240	32.54%	159
3	Rymbai	76.45%	Nihon Ksih	APHLC	4,157	37.%	Obil Kyndait	INC	3,548	31.58%	609
4	Sutnga-Shangpung	73.8%	Barrister Pakem	HSPDP	3,695	40.78%	Onward Leyswell Nongtdu	INC	2,982	32.91%	713
5	Raliang	78.93%	Humphrey Hadem	HSPDP	5,317	40.32%	Hamdon Lamare	APHLC	3,946	29.92%	1,371
6	Nartiang	76.82%	Edwingson Bareh	Independent	3,244	30.63%	H. Britainwar Dan	APHLC	2,798	26.42%	446
7	Nongbah-Wahiajer	78.06%	Indro Pariat	HSPDP	2,160	24.41%	Katsingh Thubru	APHLC	2,129	24.06%	31
8	Jowai	80.39%	Dr. Roytre Christopher Laloo	INC	2,291	26.73%	Tylli Kundiah	APHLC	1,751	20.43%	540
9	Mawhati	71.68%	S. R. Moksha	HSPDP	4,216	59.03%	Martin N. Majaw	PDC	2,520	35.28%	1,696
10	Umroi	72.87%	E. K. Mawlong	HSPDP	3,645	46.07%	Ialamdhrang Masharing	INC	2,284	28.87%	1,361
11	Nongpoh	72.3%	Dr. D. D. Lapang	INC	3,017	39.62%	Chosterfield Khongwir	HSPDP	2,416	31.73%	601
12	Jirang	59.28%	Gerson Lyngdoh	HSPDP	1,789	29.28%	J. Dringwell Rymbai	INC	1,457	23.85%	332
13	Mairang	76.82%	Kitdor Syiem	APHLC	4,068	44.72%	Fuller Lyngdoh Mawnai	HSPDP	2,179	23.95%	1,889
14	Nongspung	77.21%	Winstone Syiemiong	HSPDP	4,825	56.16%	Hershon Marbaniang	Independent	1,623	18.89%	3,202
15	Sohiong	68.14%	Nit Shabong	INC	3,562	42.38%	Medras Mylliem	HSPDP	2,570	30.58%	992
16	Mylliem	78.52%	Oris Lyngdoh	APHLC	2,943	33.78%	Dentist Mohan Roy Kharkongor	PDC	2,608	29.94%	335
17	Laitumkhrah	67.15%	Justin Khonglah	APHLC	2,968	42.66%	Peter G. Marbaniang	HSPDP	2,399	34.48%	569
18	Pynthorumkhrah	68.34%	B. K. Roy	INC	2,993	37.11%	James Marvin Pariat	Independent	1,968	24.4%	1,025
19	Jaiaw	70.79%	P. Ripple Kyndiah	APHLC	4,102	44.92%	Sain Manick Jyrwa	HSPDP	3,138	34.36%	964
20	Mawkhar	66.12%	Korbar Singh	APHLC	1,772	32.45%	W. Humphrey Dolly Syngkon	INC	1,496	27.4%	276
21	Mawprem	69.04%	Dhrubanath Joshi	INC	3,375	53.33%	Hereford S. Sawian	Independent	2,262	35.74%	1,113
22	Laban	69.96%	Bhaskar Choudhury	INC	2,588	39.9%	Garland Nonglait	APHLC	1,668	25.72%	920
23	Mawlai	76.3%	Stanlington David Khongwir	HSPDP	4,274	50.93%	Anthony Jala	APHLC	3,669	43.72%	605
24	Sohryngkham	76.08%	Grosswell Mylliemngap	APHLC	2,942	38.92%	Dringson E. Shallam	PDC	2,099	27.76%	843
25	Dienglieng	76.77%	Medistar Warbah	PDC	2,853	37.16%	Martle N Mukhim	APHLC	2,772	36.11%	81
26	Nongkrem	80.65%	Dominic Roblin Nongkynrih	PDC	2,899	32.35%	Hispreachering Son Shylla	Independent	2,375	26.5%	524
27	Langkyrdem	70.1%	Brington Buhai Lyngdoh	APHLC	3,071	37.08%	Denis Rynjah	PDC	2,524	30.47%	547
28	Nongshken	76.87%	Ganold Stone Massar	HSPDP	2,925	38.08%	Maham Singh	INC	2,279	29.67%	646
29	Sohra	72.74%	Dr. Flinder Anderson Khonglam	HSPDP	3,108	39.89%	S. Phaindrojen Swer	APHLC	2,908	37.33%	200
30	Shella	68.7%	S. Galmendar Singh Lyngdoh	APHLC	2,186	32.96%	R. Wester Tiewsoh	PDC	1,865	28.12%	321
31	Mawsynram	73.69%	Mestonnath Kharshandy	INC	2,397	31.85%	D. Plaslanding Iangjuh	HSPDP	1,986	26.39%	411
32	Mawkyrwat	75.48%	Rowell Lyngdoh	HSPDP	2,476	29.12%	E. Garland Royal Syiem	INC	2,386	28.06%	90
33	Pariong	62.5%	Tubarlin Lyngdoh	HSPDP	3,927	57.8%	B. Phrinlington Marngar	APHLC	2,017	29.69%	1,910
34	Nongstoin	59.75%	Hopingstone Lyngdoh	HSPDP	4,218	39.16%	K. Mawlot	Independent	2,262	21.%	1,956
35	Langrin	75.74%	Bakstarwell Wanniang	HSPDP	4,364	53.7%	Hetlin Shira	APHLC	2,399	29.52%	1,965
36	Mawthengkut	70.44%	H. Ledishon Nongsiang	HSPDP	2,726	30.98%	Eblin J. Sangma	INC	2,477	28.15%	249
37	Baghmara	69.63%	Williamson A. Sangma	INC	4,970	74.91%	Emerson Marak	APHLC	1,186	17.87%	3,784
38	Rongrenggiri	61.69%	Albinstone M. Sangma	INC	3,142	42.18%	Willipson Marak	APHLC	2,009	26.97%	1,133
39	Rongjeng	66.75%	Nihimson R. Sangma	INC	1,716	30.47%	Pleander G. Momin	Independent	1,361	24.17%	355
40	Kharkutta	60.73%	Pretting Tone Sangma	INC	2,947	45.51%	Kurendra D. Shira	Independent	1,694	26.16%	1,253
41	Mendipathar	78.91%	Beninstand G. Momin	APHLC	3,330	39.42%	Frankenstein W. Momin	INC	2,477	29.32%	853
42	Resubelpara	74.82%	Salseng C. Marak	INC	4,252	61.41%	Nablune G. Momin	Independent	2,672	38.59%	1,580
43	Songsak	58.45%	Elwin Sangma	INC	2,190	41.51%	Rockefeller G. Momin	HSPDP	1,370	25.97%	820
44	Bajengdoba	66.05%	Chamberline Marak	INC	4,059	63.82%	Grohonsing Marak	APHLC	2,144	33.71%	1,915
45	Tikrikilla	80.14%	Monindra Rava	INC	3,314	45.63%	Bipin Daring	HSPDP	2,005	27.61%	1,309
46	Dadenggre	65.54%	Norwin Sangma	INC	3,432	43.81%	Denison M. Sangma	HSPDP	2,313	29.53%	1,119
47	Rongchugiri	63.59%	William Cecil Marak	APHLC	2,573	51.13%	M. Reidson Momin	INC	1,768	35.14%	805
48	Phulbari	87.29%	Parimal Rava	APHLC	2,740	26.9%	Sofier Rahman Hazarika	Independent	2,398	23.54%	342
49	Rajabala	86.54%	Khorsedur Rahman Khan	INC	3,129	30.37%	Mozibur Rahman	Independent	2,568	24.93%	561
50	Selsella	77.17%	Atul C. Marak	INC	2,389	42.9%	Predingson Marak	APHLC	1,362	24.46%	1,027
51	Rongram	75.29%	Crunden S. Sangma	APHLC	3,659	46.29%	Godwin D. Shira	INC	2,918	36.92%	741
52	Tura	68.82%	Sanford K. Marak	INC	3,754	37.48%	Wilnam A. Sangma	APHLC	3,407	34.02%	347
53	Chokpot	71.22%	Clifford Marak	Independent	1,690	27.29%	Masonsing Sangma	INC	1,517	24.5%	173
54	Kherapara	68.28%	Roster M. Sangma	INC	1,891	16.04%	Oliver G. Momin	Independent	1,077	10.27%	814
55	Dalu	76.76%	Kamal R. Bhowmik	INC	1,861	29.94%	Mukul Das	Independent	1,209	19.45%	652
56	Rangsakona	74.93%	Pipinson Momin	INC	2,645	36.84%	Jenden Ch. Marak	APHLC	2,481	34.55%	164
57	Ampatigiri	78.29%	Bhadreswar Koch	INC	3,053	33.16%	Monendro Agitok	HSPDP	2,870	31.17%	183
58	Salmanpara	72.99%	Meckenson Sangma	APHLC	2,289	30.88%	Nimarson Momin	INC	2,035	27.46%	254
59	Mahendraganj	84.89%	Lokhindor Hajong	INC	3,269	40.35%	Shamsul Haque	Independent	2,581	31.86%	688
60	Dalamgiri	80.46%	Ira Marak	INC	4,089	42.16%	Armison Marak	APHLC	2,980	57.84%	1,109
