= Sutnga-Shangpung Assembly constituency =

Constituency of the Meghalaya legislative assembly in India

Sutnga-Shangpung
- Former constituency for the Meghalaya Legislative Assembly

Constituency details
- Country: India
- Region: Northeast India
- State: Meghalaya
- Established: 1978
- Abolished: 2013
- Total electors: 20,892

Sutnga-Shangpung Assembly constituency was an assembly constituency in the India state of Meghalaya.

== Members of the Legislative Assembly ==
Election	Member	Party
1978	Barrister Pakem	Hill State People's Democratic Party
1983	Barrister Pakem	Hill State People's Democratic Party
1988	Onward Leyswell Nongtdu	Indian National Congress
1993	Oliverneat Chyrmang	Hill People's Union
1998	Oliverneat Chyrmang	United Democratic Party
2003	Shitlang Pale	Indian National Congress
2008	Shitlang Pale	Indian National Congress

== Election results ==
=== Assembly Election 2008 ===
2008 Meghalaya Legislative Assembly election: Sutnga-Shangpung
Party	Candidate	Votes	%	±%
INC	Shitlang Pale	9,814	50.99%	▲5.19
UDP	Richard Singh Lyngdoh	7,938	41.24%	▲9.21
KHNAM	Bison Paslein	1,496	7.77%	New
Margin of victory		1,876	9.75%	▼4.02
Turnout		19,248	92.13%	▲13.14
Registered electors		20,892		▼7.62
INC hold		Swing	▲5.19	

=== Assembly Election 2003 ===
2003 Meghalaya Legislative Assembly election: Sutnga-Shangpung
Party	Candidate	Votes	%	±%
INC	Shitlang Pale	8,182	45.80%	▲13.25
UDP	Oliverneat Chyrmang	5,722	32.03%	▼11.45
BJP	Thianga Ngamlai	1,738	9.73%	▲9.36
NCP	E. C. Boniface Bamon	1,500	8.40%	New
Independent	Shngainlang Bamon	722	4.04%	New
Margin of victory		2,460	13.77%	▲2.84
Turnout		17,864	78.99%	▼2.03
Registered electors		22,616		▲9.40
INC gain from UDP		Swing	▲2.32	

=== Assembly Election 1998 ===
1998 Meghalaya Legislative Assembly election: Sutnga-Shangpung
Party	Candidate	Votes	%	±%
UDP	Oliverneat Chyrmang	7,282	43.48%	New
INC	Shitlang Pale	5,452	32.55%	▼6.24
Independent	E. C. Boniface Bamon	2,617	15.63%	New
PDM	Richard Singh Lyngdoh	1,336	7.98%	New
BJP	Ionis Dkhar	61	0.36%	New
Margin of victory		1,830	10.93%	▲4.00
Turnout		16,748	82.96%	▲0.29
Registered electors		20,672		▲8.07
UDP gain from HPU		Swing	▼2.23	

=== Assembly Election 1993 ===
1993 Meghalaya Legislative Assembly election: Sutnga-Shangpung
Party	Candidate	Votes	%	±%
HPU	Oliverneat Chyrmang	7,059	45.71%	▼3.60
INC	Onward Leyswell Nongtdu	5,990	38.79%	▼10.99
Independent	Beryl Sutnga	2,393	15.50%	New
Margin of victory		1,069	6.92%	▲6.46
Turnout		15,442	82.16%	▼5.94
Registered electors		19,128		▲49.09
HPU gain from INC		Swing		

=== Assembly Election 1988 ===
1988 Meghalaya Legislative Assembly election: Sutnga-Shangpung
Party	Candidate	Votes	%	±%
INC	Onward Leyswell Nongtdu	5,536	49.78%	▲16.87
HPU	Barrister Pakem	5,484	49.32%	New
HSPDP	Haring Pala	100	0.90%	▼39.88
Margin of victory		52	0.47%	▼7.40
Turnout		11,120	88.67%	▲15.11
Registered electors		12,830		▲1.33
INC gain from HSPDP		Swing		

=== Assembly Election 1983 ===
1983 Meghalaya Legislative Assembly election: Sutnga-Shangpung
Party	Candidate	Votes	%	±%
HSPDP	Barrister Pakem	3,695	40.78%	▲6.82
INC	Onward Leyswell Nongtdu	2,982	32.91%	▲7.33
AHL	Beryl Sutnga	2,383	26.30%	▼6.42
Margin of victory		713	7.87%	▲6.63
Turnout		9,060	73.80%	▼6.48
Registered electors		12,661		▲25.46
HSPDP hold		Swing		

=== Assembly Election 1978 ===
1978 Meghalaya Legislative Assembly election: Sutnga-Shangpung
Party	Candidate	Votes	%	±%
HSPDP	Barrister Pakem	2,675	33.96%	New
AHL	Beryle Sutnga	2,577	32.72%	New
INC	Onward Leyswell Nongtdu	2,015	25.58%	New
Independent	Kom Rease Nongtdue	609	7.73%	New
Margin of victory		98	1.24%	
Turnout		7,876	79.59%	
Registered electors		10,092		
HSPDP win (new seat)				
