= Langrin Assembly constituency =

Constituency of the Meghalaya legislative assembly in India

Langrin
- Former constituency for the Meghalaya Legislative Assembly

Constituency details
- Country: India
- Region: Northeast India
- State: Meghalaya
- Established: 1972
- Abolished: 2013
- Total electors: 21,269

Langrin Assembly constituency was an assembly constituency in the India state of Meghalaya.

== Members of the Legislative Assembly ==
Election	Member	Party
1972	Humdhrey Nongrum	All Party Hill Leaders Conference
1978	Bakstarwell Wanniang	Hill State People's Democratic Party
1983	Bakstarwell Wanniang	Hill State People's Democratic Party
1988	Probin K. Raswai	Indian National Congress
1993	Probin K. Raswai	Indian National Congress
1998	Martin M. Danggo	People's Democratic Movement
2003	Martin M. Danggo	Indian National Congress
2008	Martin M. Danggo	Indian National Congress

== Election results ==
=== Assembly Election 2008 ===
2008 Meghalaya Legislative Assembly election: Langrin
Party	Candidate	Votes	%	±%
INC	Martin M. Danggo	9,100	46.89%	▲10.77
UDP	Khranglin Lyngkhoi	5,026	25.90%	▲2.86
NCP	Leenga A. Sangma	3,355	17.29%	▼8.98
MDP	Jotin Khardewsaw	1,201	6.19%	New
HSPDP	Rangsandor Syiem	504	2.60%	▼0.64
LJP	Baltasar Nonglang	223	1.15%	New
Margin of victory		4,074	20.99%	▲11.14
Turnout		19,409	91.25%	▲18.82
Registered electors		21,269		▲0.99
INC hold		Swing	▲10.77	

=== Assembly Election 2003 ===
2003 Meghalaya Legislative Assembly election: Langrin
Party	Candidate	Votes	%	±%
INC	Martin M. Danggo	5,509	36.11%	▲4.50
NCP	Probin K. Raswai	4,007	26.27%	New
UDP	Khranglin Lyngkhoi	3,514	23.04%	▲12.70
BJP	Rosland Iawphniaw	878	5.76%	New
KHNAM	Trueman Rngaid	853	5.59%	New
HSPDP	Rangsandor Syiem	494	3.24%	▼13.31
Margin of victory		1,502	9.85%	▲8.97
Turnout		15,255	72.44%	▼4.80
Registered electors		21,060		▲15.30
INC gain from PDM		Swing	▲3.62	

=== Assembly Election 1998 ===
1998 Meghalaya Legislative Assembly election: Langrin
Party	Candidate	Votes	%	±%
PDM	Martin M. Danggo	4,584	32.49%	New
INC	Probin K. Raswai	4,460	31.61%	▼27.05
HSPDP	Dlingklinson Roy Wanniang	2,334	16.54%	New
UDP	Khranglin Lyngkhoi	1,458	10.33%	New
Independent	Rosland Iawphniaw	1,272	9.02%	New
Margin of victory		124	0.88%	▼19.75
Turnout		14,108	79.56%	▼1.83
Registered electors		18,265		▲1.31
PDM gain from INC		Swing	▼26.17	

=== Assembly Election 1993 ===
1993 Meghalaya Legislative Assembly election: Langrin
Party	Candidate	Votes	%	±%
INC	Probin K. Raswai	8,362	58.66%	▲6.85
HPU	Bakstarwell Wanniang	5,422	38.04%	▲7.94
Independent	Triparson G. Momin	470	3.30%	New
Margin of victory		2,940	20.63%	▼1.09
Turnout		14,254	81.25%	▼0.88
Registered electors		18,028		▲35.05
INC hold		Swing		

=== Assembly Election 1988 ===
1988 Meghalaya Legislative Assembly election: Langrin
Party	Candidate	Votes	%	±%
INC	Probin K. Raswai	5,530	51.82%	▲35.03
HPU	Bakstarwell Wanniang	3,212	30.10%	New
Independent	Daniel S. Lyngdoh	1,032	9.67%	New
HSPDP	Sehekaya Lyngdoh	898	8.41%	▼45.28
Margin of victory		2,318	21.72%	▼2.46
Turnout		10,672	82.23%	▲7.62
Registered electors		13,349		▲18.80
INC gain from HSPDP		Swing	▼1.88	

=== Assembly Election 1983 ===
1983 Meghalaya Legislative Assembly election: Langrin
Party	Candidate	Votes	%	±%
HSPDP	Bakstarwell Wanniang	4,364	53.70%	▲15.79
AHL	Hetlin Shira	2,399	29.52%	▲12.73
INC	Humphrey Nongrum	1,364	16.78%	▲4.13
Margin of victory		1,965	24.18%	▲17.29
Turnout		8,127	75.74%	▲3.07
Registered electors		11,237		▲12.92
HSPDP hold		Swing		

=== Assembly Election 1978 ===
1978 Meghalaya Legislative Assembly election: Langrin
Party	Candidate	Votes	%	±%
HSPDP	Bakstarwell Wanniang	2,612	37.90%	New
Independent	Hetlin Shira	2,137	31.01%	New
AHL	Humphrey Nongrum	1,157	16.79%	▼31.80
INC	Garland Royal Syiem	872	12.65%	New
Independent	E. Kredick Thongni	113	1.64%	New
Margin of victory		475	6.89%	▲3.33
Turnout		6,891	71.63%	▲20.24
Registered electors		9,951		▲48.37
HSPDP gain from AHL		Swing	▼10.68	

=== Assembly Election 1972 ===
1972 Meghalaya Legislative Assembly election: Langrin
Party	Candidate	Votes	%	±%
AHL	Humdhrey Nongrum	1,597	48.59%	New
Independent	Balkstar Wanniang	1,480	45.03%	New
Independent	Thwirin Thongni	210	6.39%	New
Margin of victory		117	3.56%	
Turnout		3,287	50.60%	
Registered electors		6,707		
AHL win (new seat)				
