= War-Jaintia Assembly constituency =

Constituency of the Meghalaya legislative assembly in India

War-Jaintia
- Former constituency for the Meghalaya Legislative Assembly

Constituency details
- Country: India
- Region: Northeast India
- State: Meghalaya
- Established: 1978
- Abolished: 2013
- Total electors: 20,497

War-Jaintia Assembly constituency was an assembly constituency in the India state of Meghalaya.

== Members of the Legislative Assembly ==
| Election | Member | Party |
|---|---|---|
| 1978 | Johndeng Pohrmen | All Party Hill Leaders Conference |
| 1983 | H. Enowell Pohshna | Independent politician |
| 1988 | Johndeng Pohrmen | Indian National Congress |
| 1993 | Johndeng Pohrmen | Indian National Congress |
| 1998 | Riang Lenon Tariang | United Democratic Party |
| 2003 | Riang Lenon Tariang | United Democratic Party |
| 2008 | Lahkmen Rymbui | Indian National Congress |

== Election results ==
=== Assembly Election 2008 ===
2008 Meghalaya Legislative Assembly election: War-Jaintia
| Party | Candidate | Votes | % | ±% |
|---|---|---|---|---|
| INC | Lahkmen Rymbui | 6,896 | 36.40% | ▲1.87 |
| UDP | Rianglenon Tariang | 5,996 | 31.65% | ▼9.91 |
| NCP | Paul Lamin | 3,230 | 17.05% | ▼2.76 |
| KHNAM | Camillus Albert Lamin | 2,613 | 13.79% | ▲12.43 |
| BJP | Junior Lamin | 109 | 0.58% | New |
| LJP | Sevenson Dhar | 99 | 0.52% | New |
| Margin of victory | | 900 | 4.75% | ▼2.28 |
| Turnout | | 18,943 | 92.42% | ▲20.64 |
| Registered electors | | 20,497 | | ▼15.20 |
| INC gain from UDP | | Swing | ▼5.16 | |

=== Assembly Election 2003 ===
2003 Meghalaya Legislative Assembly election: War-Jaintia
| Party | Candidate | Votes | % | ±% |
|---|---|---|---|---|
| UDP | Riang Lenon Tariang | 7,211 | 41.56% | ▲2.67 |
| INC | Johndeng Pohrmen | 5,991 | 34.53% | ▼0.18 |
| NCP | Camillus Albert Lamin | 3,438 | 19.82% | New |
| HSPDP | H. Marina Dkhar | 474 | 2.73% | ▼22.43 |
| KHNAM | G.W. Pohti | 236 | 1.36% | New |
| Margin of victory | | 1,220 | 7.03% | ▲2.85 |
| Turnout | | 17,350 | 71.78% | ▼5.82 |
| Registered electors | | 24,172 | | ▲10.38 |
| UDP hold | | Swing | ▲2.67 | |

=== Assembly Election 1998 ===
1998 Meghalaya Legislative Assembly election: War-Jaintia
| Party | Candidate | Votes | % | ±% |
|---|---|---|---|---|
| UDP | Riang Lenon Tariang | 6,608 | 38.89% | New |
| INC | Johndeng Pohrmen | 5,898 | 34.71% | ▼4.39 |
| HSPDP | Camillus Albert Lamin | 4,276 | 25.16% | ▼5.36 |
| BJP | Junior Lamin Phup | 161 | 0.95% | New |
| RJD | Ebarson Lyngdoh Bhem | 49 | 0.29% | New |
| Margin of victory | | 710 | 4.18% | ▼4.40 |
| Turnout | | 16,992 | 78.53% | ▼3.82 |
| Registered electors | | 21,899 | | ▲9.81 |
| UDP gain from INC | | Swing | ▼0.21 | |

=== Assembly Election 1993 ===
1993 Meghalaya Legislative Assembly election: War-Jaintia
| Party | Candidate | Votes | % | ±% |
|---|---|---|---|---|
| INC | Johndeng Pohrmen | 6,349 | 39.10% | ▲1.74 |
| HSPDP | H. Enowell Poshna | 4,956 | 30.52% | ▼2.85 |
| Independent | Riang Tariang | 4,863 | 29.95% | New |
| Independent | Ohowot Khonglah | 53 | 0.33% | New |
| Janata Dal (B) | Savenson Dhar | 16 | 0.10% | New |
| Margin of victory | | 1,393 | 8.58% | ▲4.59 |
| Turnout | | 16,237 | 82.80% | ▼1.65 |
| Registered electors | | 19,943 | | ▲44.57 |
| INC hold | | Swing | ▲1.74 | |

=== Assembly Election 1988 ===
1988 Meghalaya Legislative Assembly election: War-Jaintia
| Party | Candidate | Votes | % | ±% |
|---|---|---|---|---|
| INC | Johndeng Pohrmen | 4,281 | 37.36% | ▲4.82 |
| HSPDP | H. Enowell Pohshna | 3,824 | 33.37% | ▲27.92 |
| HPU | Yoli Tariang | 2,472 | 21.57% | New |
| Independent | Akbar Khonglah | 756 | 6.60% | New |
| CPI | Babyson Pakyntein | 126 | 1.10% | ▼0.85 |
| Margin of victory | | 457 | 3.99% | ▲2.39 |
| Turnout | | 11,459 | 84.10% | ▲11.42 |
| Registered electors | | 13,795 | | ▼0.73 |
| INC gain from Independent | | Swing | ▲3.22 | |

=== Assembly Election 1983 ===
1983 Meghalaya Legislative Assembly election: War-Jaintia
| Party | Candidate | Votes | % | ±% |
|---|---|---|---|---|
| Independent | H. Enowell Pohshna | 3,399 | 34.14% | New |
| INC | Johndeng Pohrmen | 3,240 | 32.54% | ▼9.92 |
| AHL | Yoly Tariang | 2,031 | 20.40% | ▼33.08 |
| HSPDP | Amplias Syngkor | 543 | 5.45% | ▲1.39 |
| Independent | Midford Ryngksai | 339 | 3.40% | New |
| PDC | Brixonbell Dhar | 211 | 2.12% | New |
| CPI | Babyson Pakyntein | 194 | 1.95% | New |
| Margin of victory | | 159 | 1.60% | ▼9.42 |
| Turnout | | 9,957 | 73.59% | ▲3.42 |
| Registered electors | | 13,897 | | ▲12.14 |
| Independent gain from AHL | | Swing | ▼19.34 | |

=== Assembly Election 1978 ===
1978 Meghalaya Legislative Assembly election: War-Jaintia
| Party | Candidate | Votes | % | ±% |
|---|---|---|---|---|
| AHL | Johndeng Pohrmen | 4,522 | 53.48% | New |
| INC | H.Enowel Pohshna | 3,590 | 42.46% | New |
| HSPDP | Latmin Lymba | 344 | 4.07% | New |
| Margin of victory | | 932 | 11.02% | |
| Turnout | | 8,456 | 69.45% | |
| Registered electors | | 12,393 | | |
| AHL win (new seat) | | | | |
