= Mawprem Assembly constituency =

Constituency of the Meghalaya legislative assembly in India

Mawprem
- Former constituency for the Meghalaya Legislative Assembly

Constituency details
- Country: India
- Region: Northeast India
- State: Meghalaya
- Established: 1972
- Abolished: 2013
- Total electors: 18,820

Mawprem Assembly constituency was an assembly constituency in the India state of Meghalaya.

== Members of the Legislative Assembly ==
Election	Member	Party
1972	Maham Singh	Indian National Congress
1978	Dhrubanath Joshi	Indian National Congress
1983	Dhrubanath Joshi	Indian National Congress
1988	Dhrubanath Joshi	Indian National Congress
1993	Dhrubanath Joshi	Indian National Congress
1998	Dhrubanath Joshi	Indian National Congress
2003	Ardhendu Choudhuri	Nationalist Congress Party
2005 By-election	Manas Chaudhuri	Independent politician
2008	Manas Chaudhuri	Independent politician

== Election results ==
=== Assembly Election 2008 ===
2008 Meghalaya Legislative Assembly election: Mawprem
Party	Candidate	Votes	%	±%
Independent	Manas Chaudhuri	7,833	52.19%	New
INC	Binod Kr Joshi	5,155	34.35%	▼1.06
BJP	Vijay Rai	1,668	11.11%	▼3.59
Independent	Santar Son Nongrum	185	1.23%	New
LJP	Roger L. D. Syiemlieh	168	1.12%	New
Margin of victory		2,678	17.84%	▲4.59
Turnout		15,009	79.75%	▲29.87
Registered electors		18,820		▼5.61
Independent hold		Swing	▲3.54	

=== Assembly By-election 2005 ===
2005 Meghalaya Legislative Assembly by-election: Mawprem
Party	Candidate	Votes	%	±%
Independent	Manas Chaudhuri	4,839	48.65%	New
INC	Dambar B. Gurung	3,521	35.40%	▲8.31
BJP	Bir Bahadur Chettri	1,462	14.70%	▼8.97
HSPDP	L. Morrow Mohon Kharpuri	88	0.88%	New
Independent	Joyjit Bose	36	0.36%	New
Margin of victory		1,318	13.25%	▲2.14
Turnout		9,946	49.88%	▼1.58
Registered electors		19,938		▼1.51
Independent gain from NCP		Swing	▲10.46	

=== Assembly Election 2003 ===
2003 Meghalaya Legislative Assembly election: Mawprem
Party	Candidate	Votes	%	±%
NCP	Ardhendu Choudhuri	3,979	38.20%	New
INC	Dhrubanath Joshi	2,822	27.09%	▼28.77
BJP	Bir Bahadur Chettri	2,466	23.67%	▼15.37
Independent	Wanbok S. Lyngdoh	1,068	10.25%	New
Independent	Som Rana	82	0.79%	New
Margin of victory		1,157	11.11%	▼5.71
Turnout		10,417	51.49%	▼6.30
Registered electors		20,243		▲9.90
NCP gain from INC		Swing	▼17.66	

=== Assembly Election 1998 ===
1998 Meghalaya Legislative Assembly election: Mawprem
Party	Candidate	Votes	%	±%
INC	Dhrubanath Joshi	5,943	55.86%	▲24.18
BJP	H. Aiontis Roy Kharphuli	4,154	39.05%	▲12.53
UDP	Tyngshain Mawlong	422	3.97%	New
SP	Hridesh R. Nath	120	1.13%	New
Margin of victory		1,789	16.82%	▲11.65
Turnout		10,639	60.07%	▼6.80
Registered electors		18,419		▲23.03
INC hold		Swing	▲24.18	

=== Assembly Election 1993 ===
1993 Meghalaya Legislative Assembly election: Mawprem
Party	Candidate	Votes	%	±%
INC	Dhrubanath Joshi	3,062	31.68%	▼26.37
BJP	H. Aiontis Roy Kharphuli	2,563	26.52%	New
Independent	Bir Bahadur Chettri	1,944	20.11%	New
Independent	Humboy Shullai	1,223	12.65%	New
HSPDP	K. M. Warjri	566	5.86%	New
Independent	Tanlihok Tham	141	1.46%	New
MPPP	Hereford S. Sawian	94	0.97%	New
Margin of victory		499	5.16%	▼16.91
Turnout		9,666	66.60%	▼0.82
Registered electors		14,971		▲37.94
INC hold		Swing	▼26.37	

=== Assembly Election 1988 ===
1988 Meghalaya Legislative Assembly election: Mawprem
Party	Candidate	Votes	%	±%
INC	Dhrubanath Joshi	4,119	58.05%	▲4.72
Independent	Hereford S. Sawian	2,553	35.98%	New
HPU	Aibor Singh Nongkynri	424	5.98%	New
Margin of victory		1,566	22.07%	▲4.48
Turnout		7,096	68.81%	▲0.75
Registered electors		10,853		▲10.84
INC hold		Swing		

=== Assembly Election 1983 ===
1983 Meghalaya Legislative Assembly election: Mawprem
Party	Candidate	Votes	%	±%
INC	Dhrubanath Joshi	3,375	53.33%	▼3.84
Independent	Hereford S. Sawian	2,262	35.74%	New
CPI	Jokendro Lanong	527	8.33%	New
Independent	Narayan Joshi	165	2.61%	New
Margin of victory		1,113	17.59%	▼21.36
Turnout		6,329	69.04%	▲0.04
Registered electors		9,792		▲29.64
INC hold		Swing	▼3.84	

=== Assembly Election 1978 ===
1978 Meghalaya Legislative Assembly election: Mawprem
Party	Candidate	Votes	%	±%
INC	Dhrubanath Joshi	2,789	57.16%	▼12.51
Independent	Harendra Kumar Datta	889	18.22%	New
Independent	Liladhar Chowhdhury	812	16.64%	New
HSPDP	Ochondro Singh Syiemlieh	325	6.66%	New
Independent	Nobait Swear	64	1.31%	New
Margin of victory		1,900	38.94%	▼0.40
Turnout		4,879	67.77%	▲2.30
Registered electors		7,553		▲2.37
INC hold		Swing	▼12.51	

=== Assembly Election 1972 ===
1972 Meghalaya Legislative Assembly election: Mawprem
Party	Candidate	Votes	%	±%
INC	Maham Singh	3,202	69.67%	New
Independent	Jokendro Lanong	1,394	30.33%	New
Margin of victory		1,808	39.34%	
Turnout		4,596	64.56%	
Registered electors		7,378		
INC win (new seat)				
