= Rongrenggiri Assembly constituency =

Constituency of the Meghalaya legislative assembly in India

Rongrenggiri
- Former constituency for the Meghalaya Legislative Assembly

Constituency details
- Country: India
- Region: Northeast India
- State: Meghalaya
- Established: 1972
- Abolished: 2013
- Total electors: 29,824

Rongrenggiri Assembly constituency was an assembly constituency in the India state of Meghalaya.

== Members of the Legislative Assembly ==
Election	Member	Party
1972	Choronsing Sangma	All Party Hill Leaders Conference
1978	Albinstone M. Sangma	Indian National Congress
1983	Albinstone M. Sangma	Indian National Congress
1988	Projend D. Sangma	Hill People's Union
1993	Projend D. Sangma	Independent politician
1998	Debora C. Marak	Indian National Congress
2003	Debora C. Marak	Indian National Congress
2008	Marcuise N. Marak	Nationalist Congress Party

== Election results ==
=== Assembly Election 2008 ===
2008 Meghalaya Legislative Assembly election: Rongrenggiri
Party	Candidate	Votes	%	±%
NCP	Marcuise N. Marak	11,942	46.65%	▲10.32
INC	Debora C. Marak	8,581	33.52%	▼3.11
UDP	Newton B. Marak	4,238	16.55%	New
MDP	Lenitha Sangma	839	3.28%	New
Margin of victory		3,361	13.13%	▲12.83
Turnout		25,600	85.84%	▲18.56
Registered electors		29,824		▼2.43
NCP gain from INC		Swing	▲10.02	

=== Assembly Election 2003 ===
2003 Meghalaya Legislative Assembly election: Rongrenggiri
Party	Candidate	Votes	%	±%
INC	Debora C. Marak	7,533	36.63%	▼4.26
NCP	Marcuise N. Marak	7,472	36.33%	New
Independent	Projend D. Sangma	5,187	25.22%	New
BJP	Ismail Marak	374	1.82%	▼2.24
Margin of victory		61	0.30%	▼9.70
Turnout		20,566	67.34%	▲2.33
Registered electors		30,568		▲15.21
INC hold		Swing	▼4.26	

=== Assembly Election 1998 ===
1998 Meghalaya Legislative Assembly election: Rongrenggiri
Party	Candidate	Votes	%	±%
INC	Debora C. Marak	7,046	40.89%	▲17.45
UDP	Projend D. Sangma	5,323	30.89%	New
Independent	Lenin R. Marak	3,374	19.58%	New
Independent	Trumen Marak	789	4.58%	New
BJP	Ismail Marak	700	4.06%	New
Margin of victory		1,723	10.00%	▲7.21
Turnout		17,232	67.09%	▼7.47
Registered electors		26,533		▲21.40
INC gain from Independent		Swing	▲14.66	

=== Assembly Election 1993 ===
1993 Meghalaya Legislative Assembly election: Rongrenggiri
Party	Candidate	Votes	%	±%
Independent	Projend D. Sangma	4,151	26.23%	New
INC	Albinstone M. Sangma	3,709	23.43%	▼5.61
AHL(AM)	Truman Marak	2,813	17.77%	New
HPU	Mahamsing M. Sangma	2,417	15.27%	▼26.40
Independent	Swapan Sangma	1,693	10.70%	New
Independent	Danbosh N. Sangma	1,044	6.60%	New
Margin of victory		442	2.79%	▼9.84
Turnout		15,827	74.07%	▲3.48
Registered electors		21,856		▲37.71
Independent gain from HPU		Swing	▼15.45	

=== Assembly Election 1988 ===
1988 Meghalaya Legislative Assembly election: Rongrenggiri
Party	Candidate	Votes	%	±%
HPU	Projend D. Sangma	4,559	41.67%	New
INC	Albinstone M. Sangma	3,177	29.04%	▼13.14
Independent	Willipson Marak	1,001	9.15%	New
Independent	Swapan Sangma	839	7.67%	New
Independent	Boston M. Momin	434	3.97%	New
Independent	Nitar Marak	206	1.88%	New
Margin of victory		1,382	12.63%	▼2.58
Turnout		10,940	71.53%	▲10.33
Registered electors		15,871		▲24.86
HPU gain from INC		Swing	▼0.51	

=== Assembly Election 1983 ===
1983 Meghalaya Legislative Assembly election: Rongrenggiri
Party	Candidate	Votes	%	±%
INC	Albinstone M. Sangma	3,142	42.18%	▲5.12
AHL	Willipson Marak	2,009	26.97%	▼7.52
Independent	Lehinson Sangma	1,925	25.84%	New
HSPDP	Nitar Marak	373	5.01%	New
Margin of victory		1,133	15.21%	▲12.64
Turnout		7,449	61.69%	▲7.15
Registered electors		12,711		▲29.40
INC hold		Swing	▲5.12	

=== Assembly Election 1978 ===
1978 Meghalaya Legislative Assembly election: Rongrenggiri
Party	Candidate	Votes	%	±%
INC	Albinstone M. Sangma	1,873	37.06%	New
AHL	Projengton G. Momin	1,743	34.49%	▼44.43
Independent	Willipson Marak	901	17.83%	New
Independent	Lehinson Sangma	537	10.63%	New
Margin of victory		130	2.57%	▼60.36
Turnout		5,054	55.03%	▲34.32
Registered electors		9,823		▲36.51
INC gain from AHL		Swing	▼41.85	

=== Assembly Election 1972 ===
1972 Meghalaya Legislative Assembly election: Rongrenggiri
Party	Candidate	Votes	%	±%
AHL	Choronsing Sangma	973	78.91%	New
Independent	Metrona Marak	197	15.98%	New
Independent	Herculesh R Marak	63	5.11%	New
Margin of victory		776	62.94%	
Turnout		1,233	18.23%	
Registered electors		7,196		
AHL win (new seat)				
