= Tura Assembly constituency =

Constituency of the Meghalaya legislative assembly in India

Tura
- Former constituency for the Meghalaya Legislative Assembly

Constituency details
- Country: India
- Region: Northeast India
- State: Meghalaya
- Established: 1972
- Abolished: 2013
- Total electors: 39,698

Tura Assembly constituency was an assembly constituency in the India state of Meghalaya.

== Members of the Legislative Assembly ==
Election	Member	Party
1972	Singjan Sangma	Indian National Congress
1978	Singjan Sangma	Indian National Congress
1983	Sanford K. Marak	Indian National Congress
1988	Purno Agitok Sangma	Indian National Congress
1993	Joylange Momin	Indian National Congress
1998	Kulert Cheran Momin	Independent politician
2003	Billy Kid A. Sangma	Independent politician
2008	Purno Agitok Sangma	Nationalist Congress Party

== Election results ==
=== Assembly Election 2008 ===
2008 Meghalaya Legislative Assembly election: Tura
Party	Candidate	Votes	%	±%
NCP	Purno Agitok Sangma	10,881	35.41%	▲21.41
Independent	Billy Kid A. Sangma	8,056	26.22%	New
Independent	John Leslee K. Sangma	5,186	16.88%	New
INC	Cyrus Tangseng D. Shira	2,617	8.52%	▼0.70
BJP	Albert A. Sangma	1,438	4.68%	▼2.49
Independent	Kulert Cheran Momin	1,286	4.18%	New
UDP	Tinash Ch. Momin	1,265	4.12%	New
Margin of victory		2,825	9.19%	▲1.66
Turnout		30,729	77.41%	▲20.04
Registered electors		39,698		▼3.51
NCP gain from Independent		Swing	▲5.02	

=== Assembly Election 2003 ===
2003 Meghalaya Legislative Assembly election: Tura
Party	Candidate	Votes	%	±%
Independent	Billy Kid A. Sangma	7,171	30.39%	New
Independent	John Leslee K. Sangma	5,394	22.86%	New
Independent	John S. D. Shira	3,370	14.28%	New
NCP	Kulert Cheran Momin	3,304	14.00%	New
INC	Joylance Momin	2,175	9.22%	▼22.19
BJP	Roster Sangma	1,693	7.17%	▼12.78
Independent	Indrajit A. Sangma	493	2.09%	New
Margin of victory		1,777	7.53%	▲5.74
Turnout		23,600	57.36%	▲0.76
Registered electors		41,142		▲8.48
Independent hold		Swing	▼2.81	

=== Assembly Election 1998 ===
1998 Meghalaya Legislative Assembly election: Tura
Party	Candidate	Votes	%	±%
Independent	Kulert Cheran Momin	7,126	33.20%	New
INC	Joylance Momin	6,741	31.40%	▼17.14
BJP	Albert A. Sangma	4,284	19.96%	▲3.21
UDP	Khirode Marak	1,797	8.37%	New
Independent	Indrajit A. Sangma	1,517	7.07%	New
Margin of victory		385	1.79%	▼30.01
Turnout		21,465	58.30%	▼7.55
Registered electors		37,925		▲37.08
Independent gain from INC		Swing	▼15.35	

=== Assembly Election 1993 ===
1993 Meghalaya Legislative Assembly election: Tura
Party	Candidate	Votes	%	±%
INC	Joylange Momin	8,617	48.55%	▼0.06
BJP	Enila Shira	2,972	16.74%	New
MPPP	Irwin K. Sangma	2,469	13.91%	New
HPU	Milton Sangam	2,460	13.86%	▲0.61
Independent	F. Javeri Sangma	1,231	6.94%	New
Margin of victory		5,645	31.80%	▲21.33
Turnout		17,749	65.50%	▼7.34
Registered electors		27,667		▲37.30
INC hold		Swing	▼0.06	

=== Assembly Election 1988 ===
1988 Meghalaya Legislative Assembly election: Tura
Party	Candidate	Votes	%	±%
INC	Purno Agitok Sangma	7,003	48.61%	▲11.13
AHL(AM)	Lamberth Sangma	5,494	38.14%	New
HPU	Barthiar Marak	1,909	13.25%	New
Margin of victory		1,509	10.47%	▲7.01
Turnout		14,406	73.63%	▲4.48
Registered electors		20,151		▲34.81
INC hold		Swing		

=== Assembly Election 1983 ===
1983 Meghalaya Legislative Assembly election: Tura
Party	Candidate	Votes	%	±%
INC	Sanford K. Marak	3,754	37.48%	▼1.67
AHL	Wilnam A. Sangma	3,407	34.02%	▲17.94
Independent	Barthiar Mark	1,282	12.80%	New
Independent	Bropathson Daring	850	8.49%	New
CPI	Robin Rema	333	3.32%	New
Independent	Singjan Sangma	222	2.22%	New
Independent	Arquish Momin	168	1.68%	New
Margin of victory		347	3.46%	▼5.60
Turnout		10,016	68.82%	▲5.00
Registered electors		14,948		▲27.67
INC hold		Swing	▼1.67	

=== Assembly Election 1978 ===
1978 Meghalaya Legislative Assembly election: Tura
Party	Candidate	Votes	%	±%
INC	Singjan Sangma	2,842	39.15%	▼12.20
Independent	Fridina Marak	2,184	30.08%	New
AHL	Mody K. Marak	1,167	16.07%	New
Independent	Jangsan K. Sangma	1,067	14.70%	New
Margin of victory		658	9.06%	▼7.99
Turnout		7,260	64.62%	▲20.39
Registered electors		11,708		▲72.40
INC hold		Swing	▼12.20	

=== Assembly Election 1972 ===
1972 Meghalaya Legislative Assembly election: Tura
Party	Candidate	Votes	%	±%
INC	Singjan Sangma	1,451	51.34%	New
Independent	Jangsan K. Sangma	969	34.29%	New
Independent	Herilla B Sangma	295	10.44%	New
Independent	Changran Marak	111	3.93%	New
Margin of victory		482	17.06%	
Turnout		2,826	44.25%	
Registered electors		6,791		
INC win (new seat)				
