= 1978 Meghalaya Legislative Assembly election =

- 25 February 1978

All 60 seats in the Meghalaya Legislative Assembly 31 seats needed for a majority
- Turnout: 67.18%
	First party	Second party
	APH	INC
Party	APHLC	INC
Seats before	32	9
Seats won	16	20
Seat change	16 ▼	11 ▲
Popular vote	94,362	109,654
Percentage	24.92	28.96
Swing	10.75 ▼	19.07 ▲
Chief Minister before election
Williamson A. Sangma
APHLC
Elected Chief Minister
Darwin Diengdoh Pugh
APHLC

The 1978 Meghalaya Legislative Assembly election was held on 25 February 1978. No party secured a majority of seats in the election. Following negotiations, a coalition government, known as the Meghalaya United Legislative Party, was formed between the All Party Hill Leaders Conference, the Hill State People's Democratic Party and the Public Demands Implementation Convention (PDIC). Due to an inability to reach agreement between the coalition parties, the position of Chief Minister was chosen by drawing lots; subsequently, on 10 March 1978, Darwin Diengdoh Pugh was sworn in as the state's second Chief Minister. Miriam D Shira from Garo Hills was the only woman elected to the legislature.

== Results ==
Parties and coalitions	Popular vote			Seats	
Parties and coalitions	Votes	%	±pp	Won	+/−
Indian National Congress (INC)	109,654	28.96	19.07 ▲	20	11 ▲
All Party Hill Leaders Conference (APHLC)	94,362	24.92	10.75 ▼	16	16 ▼
Hill State People's Democratic Party (HSPDP)	72,852	19.24		14^{[a]}	
Indian National Congress (I)	5,447	1.44		0	
Communist Party of India	2,361	0.62	0.05 ▲	0	Steady
Independents (IND)	93,970	24.82	29.04 ▼	10^{[b]}	9 ▼
Total	378,646	100.00		60	±0
Source: Election Commission of India

^{a} The HSPDP won 8 seats in the 1972 election, but the party's representatives were recorded as independents at the time of that election.

^{b} Two candidates from the PDIC were elected, but the party had not obtained registration in time for the election; the party's representatives were recorded as independents in the official results.

== Elected members ==
Results by constituency
Assembly Constituency		Turnout	Winner				Runner Up				Margin
#k	Names	%	Candidate	Party	Votes	%	Candidate	Party	Votes	%	Margin
1	War-Jaintia	69.45%	Johndeng Pohrmen	APHLC	4,522	53.48%	H.Enowel Pohshna	INC	3,590	42.46%	932
2	Rymbai	77.34%	Obil Kyndait	HSPDP	3,193	34.78%	Nihon Ksih	INC	2,858	31.13%	335
3	Sutnga-Shangpung	79.59%	Barrister Pakem	HSPDP	2,675	33.96%	Beryle Sutnga	APHLC	2,577	32.72%	98
4	Raliang	80.33%	Humphrey Hadem	HSPDP	4,062	37.79%	M. Jerveyliwin Garod	APHLC	2,681	24.94%	1,381
5	Nartiang	78.64%	H. Britainwar Dan	Independent	4,112	45.57%	Edwingson Bareh	INC	2,414	26.75%	1,698
6	Nongbah-Wahiajer	79.32%	Albin Lamare	APHLC	4,225	52.05%	B. Blooming Shallam	INC	1,709	21.05%	2,516
7	Jowai	79.57%	Tylli Kyndiah	Independent	2,230	31.84%	Disingh Shallam	Independent	1,742	24.88%	488
8	Mawhati	64.33%	Martin N. Majaw	Independent	2,412	40.09%	S. R. Moksha	HSPDP	1,887	31.37%	525
9	Umroi	72.03%	E. K. Mawlong	Independent	2,526	34.77%	Dlosingh Lyngdoh	HSPDP	1,965	27.05%	561
10	Nongpoh	66.08%	Dr. D. D. Lapang	INC	2,223	34.89%	Andreas Khongjee	APHLC	1,621	25.44%	602
11	Jirang	51.33%	Snomick Kalwing	INC	1,750	38.89%	Gerson Lyngdoh	HSPDP	1,288	28.62%	462
12	Mairang	60.71%	Fuller Lyngdoh Mawnai	HSPDP	3,496	52.75%	Irad Manik Syiem	APHLC	1,828	27.58%	1,668
13	Nongspung	75.63%	Winstone Syiemiong	HSPDP	4,988	62.06%	Horishon Lyngdoh B.	APHLC	1,904	23.69%	3,084
14	Sohiong	64.1%	Medras Mylliem	HSPDP	2,787	37.67%	Nit Shabong	Independent	2,328	31.46%	459
15	Mylliem	74.42%	Lambourne Kharlukhi	HSPDP	2,078	30.01%	Jor Manik Syiem	APHLC	1,935	27.94%	143
16	Malki-Nongthymmai	68.81%	Upstar Kharbuli	INC	2,704	40.15%	Bindo Lanong	APHLC	2,267	33.66%	437
17	Laitumkhrah	67.61%	Peter G. Mareaniang	INC	3,983	66.42%	Alexander Warjri	APHLC	1,554	25.91%	2,429
18	Pynthorumkhrah	63.85%	B. K. Roy	INC	1,575	28.67%	Subhas Chandra Bhattacharjee	Independent	794	14.45%	781
19	Jaiaw	69.95%	P. Ripple Kyndiah	APHLC	3,020	32.14%	Sain Manik Jyrwa	Independent	2,365	25.17%	655
20	Mawkhar	68.79%	Darwin Diengdoh Pugh	APHLC	1,730	30.64%	E. Shersingh Jyrwa	HSPDP	1,277	22.62%	453
21	Mawprem	67.77%	Dhrubanath Joshi	INC	2,789	57.16%	Harendra Kumar Datta	Independent	889	18.22%	1,900
22	Laban	70.1%	Bhaskar Choudhury	INC	1,932	43.8%	Rayland Singh Lyngdoh	APHLC	1,307	29.63%	625
23	Mawlai	76.65%	Stanlington David Khongwir	HSPDP	4,756	66.68%	Stoshon Roy Nongrum	APHLC	1,875	26.29%	2,881
24	Sohryngkham	67.1%	Grosswell Mylliemngap	APHLC	2,779	43.95%	Dringson E. Shallam	Independent	1,513	23.93%	1,266
25	Dienglieng	67.88%	Jungai Khongjoh	INC	1,970	31.44%	Medistar Warbah	APHLC	1,888	30.14%	82
26	Nongkrem	71.51%	Dominic Robun Nongkynrih	Independent	4,325	59.94%	Radhon S. Lyngdoh	APHLC	1,809	25.07%	2,516
27	Langkyrdem	67.77%	Brington Buhai Lyngdoh	APHLC	2,591	36.43%	Tarson Rynjah	INC	2,112	29.69%	479
28	Nongshken	66.17%	Maham Singh	INC	2,070	33.29%	Ganoldstone Massar	HSPDP	2,059	33.11%	11
29	Sohra	69.84%	Phaindrojen Swer	APHLC	2,888	41.11%	Dr. Flinder Anderson Khonglam	HSPDP	2,142	30.49%	746
30	Shella	65.36%	Stanely D D Nochols Roy	APHLC	2,174	36.86%	R. Wester Tiewsoh	Independent	1,395	23.65%	779
31	Mawsynram	72.89%	Karadoklie E. Tariang	HSPDP	1,588	24.04%	D. Plaslanding Iangjuh	Independent	1,260	19.07%	328
32	Mawkyrwat	72.78%	Rowell Lyngdoh	HSPDP	3,965	51.16%	Rendarson K. Ryaj	APHLC	1,924	24.83%	2,041
33	Pariong	67.77%	Tubarlin Lyngdoh	HSPDP	4,911	72.4%	Mak Thongni	INC	1,251	18.44%	3,660
34	Nongstoin	59.76%	Endro Lawphniaw	HSPDP	5,864	60.58%	Francis K. Mawlot	INC	2,413	24.93%	3,451
35	Langrin	71.63%	Bakstarwell Wanniang	HSPDP	2,612	37.9%	Hetlin Shira	Independent	2,137	31.01%	475
36	Mawthengkut	58.48%	Ledishon Nongsiang	HSPDP	2,111	33.53%	Maysalin War	APHLC	2,084	33.1%	27
37	Baghmara	59.62%	Williamson A. Sangma	INC	3,573	71.56%	Elphinstone R. Marak	APHLC	915	18.33%	2,658
38	Rongrenggiri	55.03%	Albinstone M. Sangma	INC	1,873	37.06%	Projengton G. Momin	APHLC	1,743	34.49%	130
39	Rongjeng	54.47%	Pleander G. Momin	INC	1,462	43.49%	Gothickson G. Momin	APHLC	1,360	40.45%	102
40	Kharkutta	57.46%	Pretting Tone Sangma	INC	2,203	49.82%	Kurendra D.Shira	Independent	1,255	28.38%	948
41	Mendipathar	56.27%	Beninstand G. Momin	APHLC	1,494	37.03%	Luthunath J. Sangma	INC	1,482	36.73%	12
42	Resubelpara	62.42%	Salseng C. Marak	INC	2,591	60.57%	Timothy Shira	APHLC	1,687	39.43%	904
43	Songsak	46.44%	Miriam D. Shira	Independent	1,156	35.04%	Choronsing Sangma	INC	1,035	31.37%	121
44	Bajengdoba	48.54%	Grohonsing Marak	INC	1,709	51.23%	Levingstone Momin	APHLC	1,017	30.49%	692
45	Tikrikilla	74.8%	Jagendranath Bantha	Independent	2,011	34.07%	Monindra Rava	INC	1,812	30.7%	199
46	Dadenggre	47.85%	Bronson W. Momin	APHLC	2,851	61.82%	Norwin Sangma	INC	1,761	38.18%	1,090
47	Rongchugiri	43.67%	M. Reidson Momin	INC	1,111	37.36%	Jackson Marak	APHLC	907	30.5%	204
48	Phulbari	83.23%	Akramozzaman	INC	2,327	29.15%	Sofiar Rahman Hazarika	Independent	2,313	28.97%	14
49	Rajabala	82.28%	Mozibur Rahman	Independent	2,896	35.08%	Khursedur Khan	INC	2,877	34.85%	19
50	Selsella	66.73%	Girash Marak	APHLC	2,170	50.96%	William Cecil R. Marak	INC	2,088	49.04%	82
51	Rongram	57.74%	Crunden S. Sangma	APHLC	1,973	36.96%	Godwin D. Shira	Independent	1,900	35.59%	73
52	Tura	64.62%	Singjan Sangma	INC	2,842	39.15%	Fridina Marak	Independent	2,184	30.08%	658
53	Chokpot	57.2%	Jackman Marak	APHLC	2,144	47.16%	Greendash R. Marka	INC	1,800	39.6%	344
54	Kherapara	50.57%	Alfrien Marak	APHLC	1,751	40.28%	Hendon T.Sangma	Independent	1,717	39.5%	34
55	Dalu	69.66%	Mukul Das	Independent	1,330	25.72%	Nimosh Sangma	INC	1,236	23.9%	94
56	Dalamgiri	68.46%	Armison Marak	APHLC	2,920	56.%	Ira Marak	INC	2,294	44.%	626
57	Rangsakona	70.8%	Jenden Ch. Marak	APHLC	3,522	60.94%	Sanford Marak	INC	2,257	39.06%	1,265
58	Ampatigiri	69.28%	Bhadreswar Koch	INC	4,551	63.36%	Jagabandhu Barman	Independent	1,841	25.63%	2,710
59	Salmanpara	64.88%	Meckenson Sangma	Independent	3,485	58.82%	Samarendro Sangma	INC	1,372	23.16%	2,113
60	Mahendraganj	85.15%	Manik Chandra Das	INC	5,158	66.%	Shamsul Haque	Independent	2,326	29.76%	2,832
