= Herbert Suchiang =

Indian politician

Herbert Suchiang (c. 1931–2017) was an Indian politician.

Prior to his entry into politics, Suchiang worked for the Indian Audit and Accounts Services. As a member of the Indian National Congress, he was elected to the Meghalaya Legislative Assembly in 1988, and represented Raliang, which falls under the West Jaintia Hills district. He took a ministerial post under D. D. Lapang. In 1999, Suchiang won election to the Jaintia Hills Autonomous District Council, within which he was chief executive member and later chairman.

He died in Guwahati on 15 October 2017, aged 86. Meghalaya Legislative Assembly speaker Abu Taher Mondal released a statement on Suchiang's death on 17 October, the same day Suchiang's funeral was held.
