= Rowell Lyngdoh =

Indian politician (died 2022)

Rowell Lyngdoh (1935/1936 – March 2022) was an Indian politician from the state of Meghalaya who represented the Mawkyrwat (ST) constituency in the South West Khasi Hills district in the Meghalaya Legislative Assembly from 2008 to 2013.

On 4 January 2018, Lyngdoh left the Indian National Congress and joined the National People's Party.

He died in March 2022, aged 86.
