= People's Democratic Movement (Meghalaya) =

Political party in Meghalaya, India

- Founded: 1997
- Dissolved: 2003
- Merged into: Indian National Congress
- ECI Status: State

Election symbol
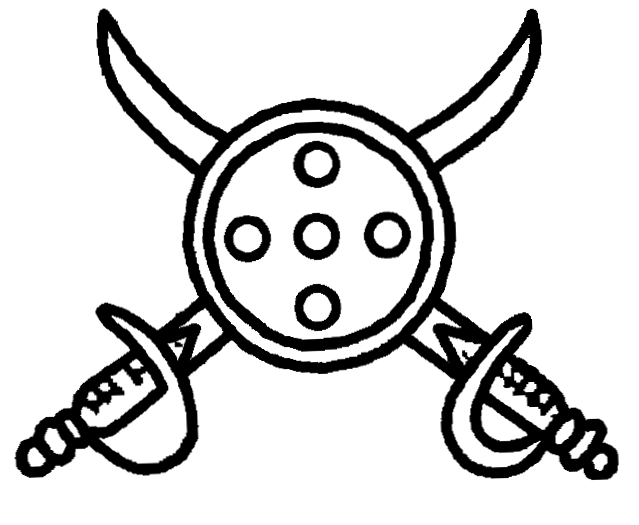

The People's Democratic Movement (PDM) was a political party in the north-east Indian state of Meghalaya. Founded in 1997, the PDM successfully won three seats in the 1998 Meghalaya Legislative Assembly election. The parties' three representatives were: Martin Danggo, Elston Roy Kharkongor and Cyprian R Sangma. The party failed to win any seats in the 2003 Assembly election and in December 2003 merged with the Indian National Congress (INC).

Legislative Assembly election results
	Seats			Votes		
	Contested	Won	+/-	Total	%	+/-
1998	19	3		58,225	6.95	
2003	8	0	▼3	16,425	1.8	▼4.1
