= Public Demands Implementation Convention =

Former political party in Meghalaya

- Founded: 1977^{[a]}
- Dissolved: 1997
- ECI Status: State Party

The Public Demands Implementation Convention (PDIC)^{[b]} was a regional political party in Meghalaya, India founded in 1977 and primarily focussed on the interests of farmers, especially those growing potatoes in the Khyrim area of the Khasi Hills. The party was a split from the All Party Hill Leaders Conference.

In 1997 the PDIC joined with the Hill People's Union, the All Party Hill Leaders Conference (Armison Marak) and Meghalaya Progressive Peoples Party to form the United Democratic Party.

Legislative Assembly election results
	Seats			Votes		
	Contested	Won	+/-	Total	%	+/-
1978		2^{[c]}				
1983	21	2	Steady	23,253	4.92	
1988	15	2	Steady	19,402	3.20	▼1.72
1993	4	2	Steady	17,423	2.14	▼1.16

== Notes ==
^{[a]} Different sources present different dates for the foundation year of the PDIC, including 1974, 1976 and 1983.
^{[b]} Different sources present different names for the PDIC, including the People's Demands Implementation Convention and the Public Demands Implementation Committee. The Election Commission of India (ECI) in the official statistical reports for the Legislative Assembly elections records the name as Public Demands Implementation Convention.
^{[c]} In the 1978, two candidates from the PDIC were elected, but the party had not obtained registration in time for the election; the party's representatives were recorded as independents in the official results.
