= Hill People's Union =

Indian political party

The Hill People's Union was a political party in the state of Meghalaya in India. It was founded in 1985. The founders were 11 members from the All Party Hill Leaders Conference and Hill State People's Democratic Party (HSPDP) who joined together after the fall of the earlier short-lived coalition government formed by the two parties, which had won 31 seats in the 1983 Meghalaya Legislative Assembly elections. It was once "one of the three major regional parties" in the state. In the 1988 elections, under the leadership of Brington Buhai Lyngdoh, the party won 19 seats in the Meghalaya Legislative Assembly. In the 1993 elections it fell to eleven seats. In 1997 its members joined with the HSPDP and the Public Demands Implementation Convention to form the United Democratic Party.
