= Hill State People's Democratic Party =

Political party in India

- President: KP Pangniang
- Secretary: Embin
- ECI Status: State Party
- Alliance: NDA; MDA (2021) (Meghalaya)
- Seats in Meghalaya Legislative Assembly: 2 / 60

Election symbol

Party flag
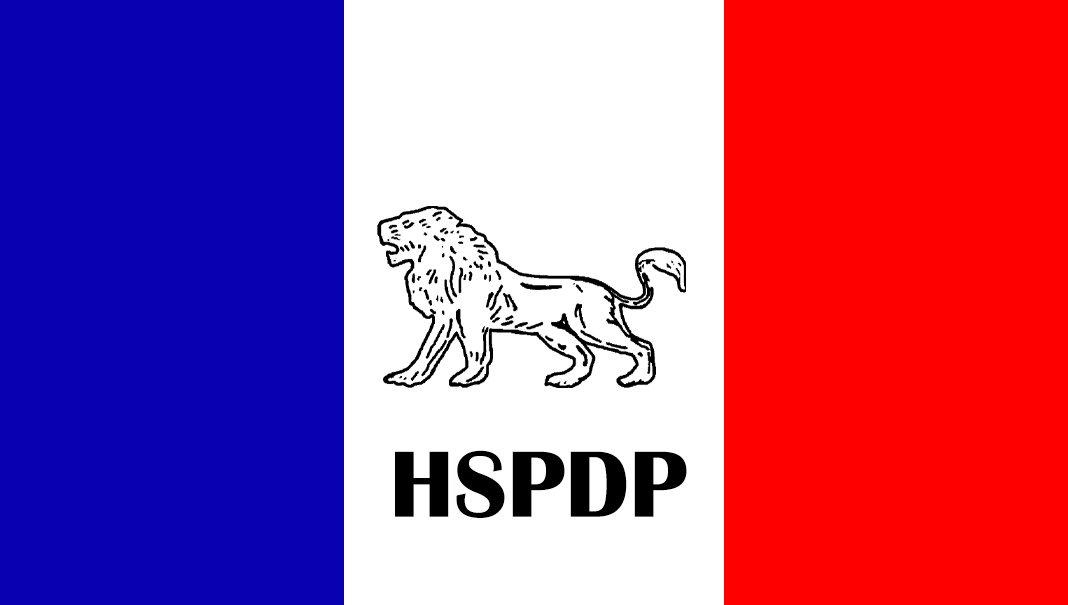

The Hill State People's Democratic Party (HSPDP) is a regional political party active in the state of Meghalaya, northeast India. Formed in 1968 as a split from the All Party Hill Leaders Conference by Hopingstone Lyngdoh, the HSPDP has had representatives in the Meghalaya Legislative Assembly since the Assembly's first elections in 1972. The HSPDP has been a junior member of coalition governments in Meghalaya on a number of occasions and following the 2018 election and 2023 election joined the National People's Party-led government of Chief Minister Conrad Sangma.

The HSPDP is part of the North-East Regional Political Front, which consists of the regional northeastern parties supporting the BJP-led National Democratic Alliance government.

== Origins ==
Shri "Hoping Stone" Lyngdoh was the president of the HSPDP, one of three official political parties of the state of Meghalaya in India. At the time of his death, Lyngdoh was the oldest serving representative member in Meghalaya and had never been defeated in Legislative Assembly election. In the initial period, the party as a whole championed the cause of separate statehood for Meghalaya, which became a reality on 21 January 1972. People refer him by the respectful title of "Ma-Hoping". Now he is the current MLA of Nongstoin Constituency. The party as a whole won four seats in the legislative Assembly as of 2012.

== See also ==
- List of political parties in India
