= 2008 elections in India =

2008 Indian elections
- ← 2006 2007 2008 2009 2010 →

Multiple State Assemblies of India went to elections in 2008.

== Legislative Assembly elections ==
Polling Date(s)	State	Government before	Chief Minister before	Government after	Elected Chief Minister	Maps
23 February 2008	Tripura	Communist Party of India (Marxist)	Manik Sarkar	Communist Party of India (Marxist)	Manik Sarkar	
3 March 2008	Meghalaya	Indian National Congress	D. D. Lapang	Meghalaya Progressive Alliance	Donkupar Roy	
5 March 2008	Nagaland	Democratic Alliance of Nagaland	Neiphiu Rio	Democratic Alliance of Nagaland	Neiphiu Rio	
10 May 2008,16 May 2008 and 22 May 2008	Karnataka	President's Rule		Bharatiya Janata Party	B. S. Yediyurappa	
14 and 20 November 2008	Chhattisgarh	Bharatiya Janata Party	Raman Singh	Bharatiya Janata Party	Raman Singh	
27 November 2008	Madhya Pradesh	Bharatiya Janata Party	Shivraj Singh Chouhan	Bharatiya Janata Party	Shivraj Singh Chouhan	
29 November 2008	Delhi	Indian National Congress	Sheila Dikshit	Indian National Congress	Sheila Dikshit	
2 December 2008	Mizoram	Mizo National Front	Zoramthanga	Indian National Congress	Lal Thanhawla	
4 December 2008	Rajasthan	Bharatiya Janata Party	Vasundhara Raje	Indian National Congress	Ashok Gehlot	
17,23 and 30 November and 7,13,17,24 December	Jammu and Kashmir	Indian National Congress	Ghulam Nabi Azad	Jammu & Kashmir National Conference	Omar Abdullah	
17,23 and 30 November and 7,13,17,24 December	Jammu and Kashmir	Jammu and Kashmir People's Democratic Party	Ghulam Nabi Azad	Indian National Congress	Omar Abdullah	

The first batch of elections for the year was announced by the Election Commission of India (ECI) on 14 January 2008. This included the elections to the Legislative Assemblies of the states of Meghalaya, Nagaland, and Tripura. Elections in all polling stations of all three states were conducted using electronic voting machines (EVMs).Elections to the state Assembly of Karnataka was announced by the ECI on 2 April 2008. This was the first election to be held under the new boundaries drawn up by the Delimitation Commission of India. The elections were split into three phases. Elections in all polling stations of the state were conducted using EVMs.

=== Chhattisgarh ===
SN	Party	Seats Contested	Seats won	Seats Changed	Vote Share
1	Bharatiya Janata Party	90	50	0	40.33
2	Indian National Congress	87	38	+ 1	38.63
3	Bahujan Samaj Party	90	2	0	6.11
	Total		90		

=== Delhi ===
SN	Party	Seats Contested	Seats won	Seats Changed	% Votes
1	Indian National Congress	69	43	4	40.31
2	Bharatiya Janata Party	69	23	+ 3	36.34
3	Bahujan Samaj Party	69	2	+ 2	14.05
4	Lok Janshakti Party	41	1	+1	1.35
4	Independent		1	0	3.92
	Total		70		

=== Jammu and Kashmir ===
SN	Party	Seats won	Seats Changed
1	Jammu & Kashmir National Conference	28	0
3	Indian National Congress	17	3
2	Peoples Democratic Party	21	+ 5
4	Bharatiya Janata Party	11	+ 10
5	Independents	4	9
6	J&K National Panthers Party	3	1
7	CPI(Marxist)	1	1
7	J&K Democratic Party Nationalist	1	+ 1
7	People's Democratic Front	1	+ 1
	Total	87	

=== Karnataka ===
SN	Party	Seats won	Seats Changed
1	Bharatiya Janata Party	110	+ 31
2	Indian National Congress	80	+ 15
3	Janata Dal (Secular)	28	
4	Others	7	15
	Total	224	

=== Madhya Pradesh ===
SN	Party	Seats Contested	Seats won	Seats Changed	% Votes
1	Bharatiya Janata Party	228	143	30	37.64
2	Indian National Congress	228	71	+ 33	32.39
3	Bahujan Samaj Party	228	7	+ 5	8.97
4	Bharatiya Jan Shakti Party	201	5	+ 5	4.71
5	Independents		3	+ 1	8.23
6	Samajwadi Party	187	1	6	1.99
	Total		230		

=== Meghalaya ===
SN	Party	Seats won	Seats Change
2	Nationalist Congress Party	15	+ 1
3	United Democratic Party	11	+ 2
4	Independents	5	0
5	Hill State People's Democratic Party	2	0
6	Bharatiya Janata Party	1	1
6	Khun Hynnieutrip National Awakaning Movement	1	1
1	Indian National Congress	25	+ 3
	Total	60	

=== Mizoram ===
SN	Party	Seats won	Seats Change
1	Indian National Congress	32	+ 20
2	Mizo National Front	3	18
3	MPC	2	0
4	Zoram Nationalist Party	2	0
	Total	40	

=== Nagaland ===
SN	Party	Seats won	Seats Change
1	Nagaland Peoples Front	26	+ 7
4	Bharatiya Janata Party	2	5
2	Indian National Congress	23	2
3	Independents	7	+ 3
4	Nationalist Congress Party	2	+ 2
	Total	60	

=== Rajasthan ===
SN	Party	Seats won	Seats Changed
1	Indian National Congress	96	+ 40
2	Bharatiya Janata Party	78	42
3	Independents	14	1
4	Bahujan Samaj Party	6	+ 4
5	Communist Party of India (Marxist)	3	+ 2
6	Loktantrik Samajwadi Party	1	+ 1
6	Janata Dal (United)	1	1
	Total	199/200	

=== Tripura ===
SN	Party	Seats won	Seats Change
1	Communist Party of India (Marxist)	46	+ 8
3	Revolutionary Socialist Party	2	0
4	Communist Party of India	1	0
2	Indian National Congress	10	3
4	Indigenous Nationalist Party of Twipra	1	5
	Total	60	

== Local body elections ==
- 2008 Uttarakhand local body elections

== See also ==
- N. Gopalaswami
