= 2003 Meghalaya Legislative Assembly election =

Election in Meghalaya, India

- 26 February 2003

All 60 seats in the Meghalaya Legislative Assembly 31 seats needed for a majority
- Turnout: 70.42
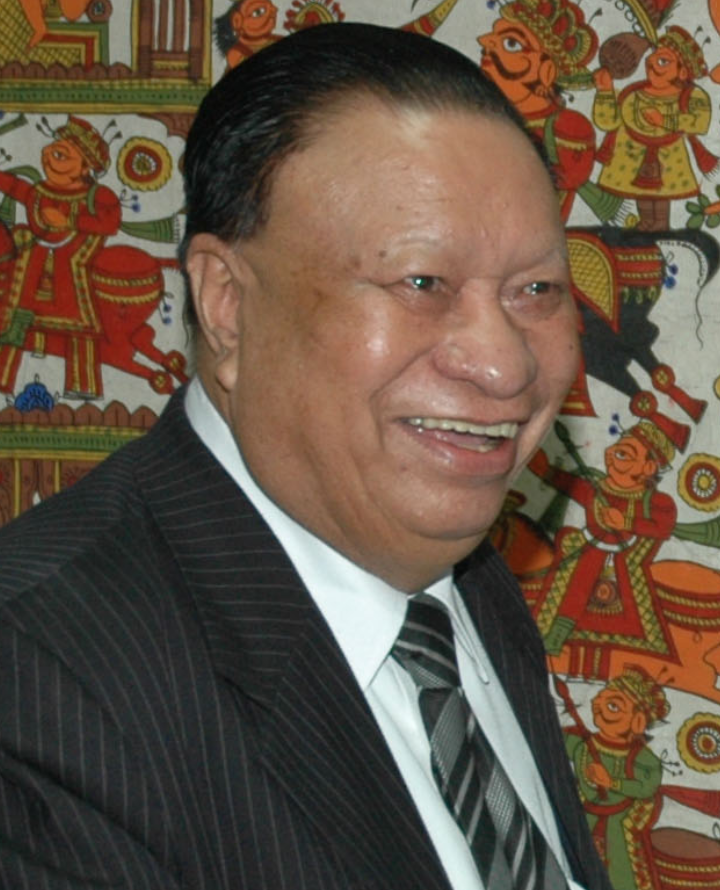

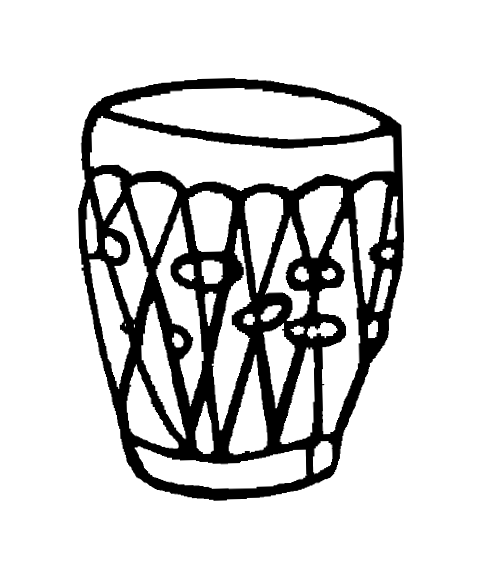
	First party	Second party
Leader	D. D. Lapang	Donkupar Roy
Party	INC	UDP
Leader's seat	Nongpoh Assembly constituency
Last election	25	20
Seats won	22	9
Seat change	▼3	▼11
Popular vote	270,269	144,255
Percentage	29.96	15.99
Swing	▼5.07	▼11
Chief Minister before election
Flinder Anderson Khonglam
Independent
Elected Chief Minister
D. D. Lapang
INC

The 2003 Meghalaya Legislative Assembly election was held on 26 February 2003. The north-east Indian state's seventh Legislative Assembly election saw major changes with 28 sitting members and two former Chief Ministers losing their seats. The election also produced the largest representation for the national parties (Indian National Congress INC, the Nationalist Congress Party NCP and the Bharatiya Janata Party BJP) and, to that point, the smallest representation for the regional parties. No party won a majority of seats and despite more than a five percent loss in the popular vote compared to the 1998 election, the INC secured a plurality. Initially, the NCP under leader E. D. Marak attempted to form a government, but failed to secure support for a majority. Subsequently, D. D. Lapang was invited by Governor M. M. Jacob to present a majority, which was successfully achieved through the formation of the Meghalaya Democratic Alliance (MDA) coalition. Made up of 42 members of the Legislative Assembly (MLAs), the MDA consisted of the INC, the United Democratic Party (UDP), the Meghalaya Democratic Party (MDP), the Khun Hynniewtrep National Awakening Movement (KHNAM) and three independents. D.D. Lapang was confirmed as Chief Minister with Donkupar Roy of the UPD as Deputy Chief Minister.

== Parties contested ==
Party	Flag	Symbol	Leader	Seats contested
Indian National Congress			D. D. Lapang	60
Nationalist Congress Party			P. A. Sangma	54
Meghalaya United Democratic Party			Donkupar Roy	45
Bharatiya Janata Party			L. K. Advani	28
Khun Hynniewtrep National Awakening Movement				22
Hill State People's Democratic Party				22
Meghalaya Democratic Party				18
People's Democratic Movement (Meghalaya)				8
Garo National Council				7
Khasi Farmers Democratic Party				4
Samata Party			George Fernandes	3
Communist Party of India			A. B. Bardhan	3
Samajwadi Party			Mulayam Singh Yadav	1

== Results ==
← Summary of the 23 February 2003 Meghalaya Legislative Assembly election results →
Parties and coalitions	Popular vote			Seats	
Parties and coalitions	Votes	%	±pp	Won	+/−
Indian National Congress (INC)	270,269	29.96	5.07 ▼	22	3 ▼
Nationalist Congress Party (NCP)	174,972	19.40		14	
United Democratic Party (UDP)	144,255	15.99	11 ▼	9	11 ▼
Bharatiya Janata Party (BJP)	48,932	5.42	0.41 ▲	2	1 ▼
Meghalaya Democratic Party (MDP)	47,852	5.31		4	
Hill State People's Democratic Party (HPDP/HSPDP)	44,520	4.94	1.83 ▼	2	1 ▼
Khun Hynnieutrip National Awakaning Movement	32,677	3.62		2	
Garo National Council (GNC)	8,483	0.94	1.17 ▼	0	1 ▼
People's Democratic Movement (Meghalaya) (PDM)	16,245	1.80	5.15 ▼	0	3 ▼
Khasi Farmers Democratic Party (KFDP)	2,478	0.27		0	
Communist Party of India	551	0.06	0.11 ▼	0	Steady
Samata Party (SAP)	811	0.09		0	
Samajwadi Party (SP)	245	0.03	0.06 ▼	0	Steady
Independents (IND)	109,686	12.16	4.0 ▼	5	Steady
Total	901,976	100.00		60	±0
Source: Election Commission of India

== Elected members ==
=== Results by constituency ===
Winner, runner-up, voter turnout, and victory margin in every constituency
Assembly Constituency		Turnout	Winner				Runner Up				Margin
#k	Names	%	Candidate	Party	Votes	%	Candidate	Party	Votes	%	Margin
1	War-Jaintia	71.78%	Riang Lenon Tariang	UDP	7,211	41.56%	Johndeng Pohrmen	INC	5,991	34.53%	1,220
2	Rymbai	80.2%	Nehlang Lyngdoh	INC	12,224	46.9%	Obil Kyndait	Independent	7,972	30.58%	4,252
3	Sutnga-Shangpung	78.99%	Shitlang Pale	INC	8,182	45.8%	Oliverneat Chyrmang	UDP	5,722	32.03%	2,460
4	Raliang	80.27%	Mihsalan Suchiang	UDP	6,336	30.4%	Wanbait Chulet	NCP	5,178	24.85%	1,158
5	Nartiang	76.37%	Draison Kharshiing	MDP	4,975	27.09%	H. Britainwar Dan	UDP	4,640	25.26%	335
6	Nongbah-Wahiajer	79.6%	Kyrmen Susngi	UDP	9,667	53.84%	Edmund Speakerson Lyngdoh	INC	7,886	43.92%	1,781
7	Jowai	76.93%	Singh Mulieh	UDP	8,967	49.36%	Dr. Roytre Christopher Laloo	INC	8,306	45.72%	661
8	Mawhati	72.14%	Phingwel Muktieh	INC	5,021	35.5%	S. R. Moksha	UDP	4,270	30.19%	751
9	Umroi	63.01%	Stanlywiss Rymbai	INC	8,352	53.5%	E. K. Mawlong	UDP	7,259	46.5%	1,093
10	Nongpoh	65.43%	Dr. D. D. Lapang	INC	7,808	51.14%	Constantine Lyngdoh	UDP	6,100	39.95%	1,708
11	Jirang	61.9%	J. Dringwell Rymbai	INC	3,888	27.89%	Artist Ranee	UDP	2,687	19.27%	1,201
12	Mairang	76.41%	Boldness L. Nongrum	INC	5,594	28.53%	Fuller Lyngdoh Mawnai	HSPDP	4,796	24.46%	798
13	Nongspung	70.02%	John Anthony Lyngdoh	UDP	7,037	43.92%	S. Loniak Marbaniang	HSPDP	4,937	30.81%	2,100
14	Sohiong	72.96%	H. Donkupar R. Lyngdoh	INC	9,518	52.87%	Rain Augustine Lyngdoh	UDP	7,209	40.04%	2,309
15	Mylliem	66.79%	Pynshai Manik Syiem	Independent	5,632	39.6%	Oris Syiem Myriaw	INC	3,083	21.68%	2,549
16	Malki-Nongthymmai	48.99%	Tony Curtis Lyngdoh	INC	5,384	47.6%	Bindo Lanong	UDP	2,792	24.69%	2,592
17	Laitumkhrah	45.52%	Robert Garnett Lyngdoh	INC	4,672	54.34%	Dr. Werlok Kharshiing	BJP	1,578	18.35%	3,094
18	Pynthorumkhrah	54.76%	Alexander Laloo Hek	BJP	10,798	69.95%	Onward L. Nongtdu	INC	3,639	23.57%	7,159
19	Jaiaw	57.76%	Paul Lyngdoh	KHNAM	5,873	57.26%	Martamlin Pyrbot	HSPDP	2,283	22.26%	3,590
20	Mawkhar	51.79%	Dr. Friday Lyngdoh	INC	3,568	59.04%	James Marvin Pariat	KHNAM	1,150	19.03%	2,418
21	Mawprem	51.49%	Ardhendu Choudhuri	NCP	3,979	38.2%	Dhrubanath Joshi	INC	2,822	27.09%	1,157
22	Laban	55.13%	Thrang Hok Rangad	BJP	5,005	59.85%	Anthony Lyngdoh	INC	2,096	25.06%	2,909
23	Mawlai	62.4%	Process T. Sawkmie	MDP	8,031	49.%	Founder Strong Cajee	PDM	6,249	38.12%	1,782
24	Sohryngkham	71.39%	Charles Pyngrope	INC	4,388	28.93%	J. Ulysses Nongrum	Independent	4,161	27.44%	227
25	Dienglieng	72.41%	Martle N Mukhim	MDP	5,238	41.79%	Teilang S Blah	KHNAM	2,775	22.14%	2,463
26	Nongkrem	71.46%	Lambor Malngiang	KHNAM	2,929	18.85%	H. S. Shylla	UDP	2,847	18.32%	82
27	Langkyrdem	65.28%	Prestone Tynsong	INC	2,832	21.49%	Syrpai Khonglah	MDP	2,415	18.32%	417
28	Nongshken	72.29%	Khan Khong Dkhar	INC	4,235	35.98%	Ganold Stone Massar	KHNAM	3,182	27.04%	1,053
29	Sohra	70.62%	Dr. Flinder Anderson Khonglam	HSPDP	4,093	32.17%	Phlour W. Khongjee	UDP	3,536	27.79%	557
30	Shella	66.15%	Dr. Donkupar Roy	UDP	3,145	32.93%	Pyndapborthiaw Saibon	KHNAM	2,923	30.61%	222
31	Mawsynram	70.46%	D. Plaslanding Iangjuh	MDP	5,467	41.16%	Gopal Stone Hynniewta	INC	4,707	35.44%	760
32	Mawkyrwat	77.76%	B. Bires Nongsiej	UDP	4,903	31.24%	Rowell Lyngdoh	INC	3,610	23.%	1,293
33	Pariong	71.47%	Irin Lyngdoh	INC	4,427	35.95%	Tubarlin Lyngdoh	HSPDP	4,398	35.71%	29
34	Nongstoin	60.9%	Hopingstone Lyngdoh	HSPDP	7,495	36.07%	Francis K. Mawlot	INC	7,001	33.69%	494
35	Langrin	72.44%	Martin M. Danggo	INC	5,509	36.11%	Probin K. Raswai	NCP	4,007	26.27%	1,502
36	Mawthengkut	71.9%	Francis Pondit R. Sangma	Independent	5,114	30.82%	H. Ledishon Nongsiang	INC	4,254	25.64%	860
37	Baghmara	75.69%	Sengran M. Sangma	INC	7,703	51.98%	Lotsing A. Sangma	NCP	6,055	40.86%	1,648
38	Rongrenggiri	67.34%	Debora C. Marak	INC	7,533	36.63%	Marcuise N. Marak	NCP	7,472	36.33%	61
39	Rongjeng	71.1%	Predickson G. Momin	Independent	5,998	44.95%	Ashutosh Marak	NCP	3,634	27.23%	2,364
40	Kharkutta	75.68%	Elstone D. Marak	NCP	6,568	41.49%	Subash Marak	INC	3,230	20.4%	3,338
41	Mendipathar	76.21%	Beninstand G. Momin	UDP	7,756	45.7%	Frankenstein W. Momin	INC	6,791	40.02%	965
42	Resubelpara	73.08%	Timothy Shira	NCP	7,957	53.33%	Salseng C. Marak	INC	6,963	46.67%	994
43	Songsak	73.26%	Heltone N. Marak	UDP	4,875	34.%	Tonsing N Marak	INC	4,693	32.73%	182
44	Bajengdoba	75.91%	John Manner Marak	NCP	7,756	51.8%	Chamberline B. Marak	INC	5,923	39.56%	1,833
45	Tikrikilla	74.55%	Mohindra Rava	NCP	4,436	29.25%	Kapin Ch. Boro	INC	3,767	24.84%	669
46	Dadenggre	77.83%	Edmund K Sangma	NCP	7,948	43.26%	Augustine D.Marak	INC	7,625	41.51%	323
47	Rongchugiri	82.44%	Beckstar Sangma	NCP	3,170	26.12%	Chanang K Marak	Independent	2,891	23.83%	279
48	Phulbari	81.21%	Manirul Islam Sarkar	INC	7,170	37.93%	Aperson G. Momin	BJP	5,616	29.71%	1,554
49	Rajabala	78.77%	Sayeedullah Nongrum	INC	7,125	41.%	Clement Marak	NCP	6,911	39.77%	214
50	Selsella	75.07%	Cyprian R. Sangma	NCP	2,875	25.27%	Atul C. Marak	INC	2,705	23.77%	170
51	Rongram	69.64%	Sengman R. Marak	Independent	4,746	30.84%	Crinathson A. Sangma	NCP	3,184	20.69%	1,562
52	Tura	57.36%	Billy Kid A. Sangma	Independent	7,171	30.39%	John Leslee K. Sangma	Independent	5,394	22.86%	1,777
53	Chokpot	76.28%	Masonsing Sangma	NCP	5,122	40.22%	Clifford R. Marak	GNC	3,068	24.09%	2,054
54	Kherapara	75.71%	Brening Sangma	NCP	5,418	41.3%	Kenethson Sangma	INC	2,714	20.69%	2,704
55	Dalu	71.9%	Samuel Sangma	NCP	3,760	34.%	Nityanarayan Smchang	BJP	3,492	31.57%	268
56	Dalamgiri	78.66%	Admiral K. Sangma	NCP	5,627	46.02%	Ira Marak	INC	4,017	32.85%	1,610
57	Rangsakona	78.48%	Zenith Sangma	INC	5,452	41.7%	Adolf Lu Hitler Marak	NCP	5,117	39.14%	335
58	Ampatigiri	77.2%	Dr. Mukul Sangma	INC	7,080	40.99%	Eril Sangma	NCP	4,941	28.61%	2,139
59	Salmanpara	76.96%	Gopinath Sangma	NCP	6,341	42.04%	Nimarson Momin	UDP	5,498	36.45%	843
60	Mahendraganj	82.74%	Nidhu Ram Hajong	NCP	6,479	44.07%	Abdus Saleh	Independent	4,780	32.51%	1,699
