= Malki-Nongthymmai Assembly constituency =

Constituency of the Meghalaya legislative assembly in India

Malki-Nongthymmai
- Former constituency for the Meghalaya Legislative Assembly

Constituency details
- Country: India
- Region: Northeast India
- State: Meghalaya
- Established: 1978
- Abolished: 2013
- Total electors: 19,924

Malki-Nongthymmai Assembly constituency was an assembly constituency in the India state of Meghalaya.

== Members of the Legislative Assembly ==
Election	Member	Party
1978	Upstar Kharbuli	Indian National Congress
1983	Bindo Lanong	All Party Hill Leaders Conference
1988	Upstar Kharbuli	Indian National Congress
1993	Tony Curtis Lyngdoh	Indian National Congress
1998	Tony Curtis Lyngdoh	Indian National Congress
2003	Tony Curtis Lyngdoh	Indian National Congress
2008	Bindo Lanong	United Democratic Party

== Election results ==
=== Assembly Election 2008 ===
2008 Meghalaya Legislative Assembly election: Malki-Nongthymmai
Party	Candidate	Votes	%	±%
UDP	Bindo Lanong	5,029	31.58%	▲6.90
INC	Tony Curtis Lyngdoh	4,166	26.16%	▼21.44
NCP	Jemino Mawthoh	2,793	17.54%	▲11.59
MDP	Pretty Kharpyngrope	1,639	10.29%	▲9.71
KHNAM	Latiplang Kharkongor	1,468	9.22%	▼5.81
BJP	Basil Lamin	594	3.73%	▼0.61
LJP	Petrus Umdor	234	1.47%	New
Margin of victory		863	5.42%	▼17.50
Turnout		15,923	79.92%	▲31.00
Registered electors		19,924		▼13.82
UDP gain from INC		Swing	▼16.02	

=== Assembly Election 2003 ===
2003 Meghalaya Legislative Assembly election: Malki-Nongthymmai
Party	Candidate	Votes	%	±%
INC	Tony Curtis Lyngdoh	5,384	47.60%	▲4.42
UDP	Bindo Lanong	2,792	24.69%	▼15.03
KHNAM	Pynlapphang S.Warjri	1,700	15.03%	New
NCP	Miquel Badwar	673	5.95%	New
BJP	Basil Lamin	491	4.34%	▼2.58
HSPDP	Anthony Kharbuli	204	1.80%	New
MDP	Micheal Kharpuri	66	0.58%	New
Margin of victory		2,592	22.92%	▲19.45
Turnout		11,310	48.99%	▼7.71
Registered electors		23,119		▲7.90
INC hold		Swing	▲4.42	

=== Assembly Election 1998 ===
1998 Meghalaya Legislative Assembly election: Malki-Nongthymmai
Party	Candidate	Votes	%	±%
INC	Tony Cortis Lyngdoh	5,240	43.18%	▲7.65
UDP	Bindo Lanong	4,819	39.71%	New
BJP	Lucia Malngiang	840	6.92%	New
Independent	G. Brighstar Mukhim	810	6.68%	New
PDM	Kroshonstone Mylliemngap	314	2.59%	New
RJD	Anthony Sawkmie	111	0.91%	New
Margin of victory		421	3.47%	▲1.97
Turnout		12,134	58.00%	▼4.51
Registered electors		21,426		▲9.83
INC hold		Swing	▲7.65	

=== Assembly Election 1993 ===
1993 Meghalaya Legislative Assembly election: Malki-Nongthymmai
Party	Candidate	Votes	%	±%
INC	Tony Curtis Lyngdoh	4,238	35.53%	▼10.43
HPU	Bindo Lanong	4,059	34.03%	▼2.03
Independent	Bull N. Lyngdoh	1,391	11.66%	New
AHL(AM)	S. Monten Kharkongor	1,319	11.06%	New
Independent	Joseph L. Kurbah	704	5.90%	New
Independent	Hamlet Bareb	118	0.99%	New
Independent	Khrawbor Nonghlaw	99	0.83%	New
Margin of victory		179	1.50%	▼8.41
Turnout		11,928	62.21%	▼3.31
Registered electors		19,508		▲38.55
INC hold		Swing	▼10.43	

=== Assembly Election 1988 ===
1988 Meghalaya Legislative Assembly election: Malki-Nongthymmai
Party	Candidate	Votes	%	±%
INC	Upstar Kharbuli	4,171	45.96%	▲13.72
HPU	Bindo Lanong	3,272	36.06%	New
HSPDP	S. Monten Kharkongor	751	8.28%	▲2.12
Independent	Pascal Malngiang	632	6.96%	New
PDC	Elston Roy Kharkongor	249	2.74%	▼7.15
Margin of victory		899	9.91%	▼4.34
Turnout		9,075	66.01%	▲1.48
Registered electors		14,080		▲24.40
INC gain from AHL		Swing	▼0.52	

=== Assembly Election 1983 ===
1983 Meghalaya Legislative Assembly election: Malki-Nongthymmai
Party	Candidate	Votes	%	±%
AHL	Bindo Lanong	3,313	46.49%	▲12.83
INC	Upstar Kharbuli	2,298	32.24%	▼7.90
PDC	Bnein Bareh	705	9.89%	New
HSPDP	B. C. Swer	439	6.16%	▼6.31
Independent	A. Blingstodar Diengdoh	175	2.46%	New
Independent	J. N. Giri	174	2.44%	New
Independent	S. Shynreng Khonglah	23	0.32%	New
Margin of victory		1,015	14.24%	▲7.75
Turnout		7,127	65.59%	▼3.46
Registered electors		11,318		▲11.64
AHL gain from INC		Swing	▲6.34	

=== Assembly Election 1978 ===
1978 Meghalaya Legislative Assembly election: Malki-Nongthymmai
Party	Candidate	Votes	%	±%
INC	Upstar Kharbuli	2,704	40.15%	New
AHL	Bindo Lanong	2,267	33.66%	New
HSPDP	David Lyngdoh	840	12.47%	New
Independent	Drosily Mukhim	589	8.75%	New
Independent	A. Thanglura	335	4.97%	New
Margin of victory		437	6.49%	
Turnout		6,735	68.81%	
Registered electors		10,138		
INC win (new seat)				
