= Meghalaya Democratic Alliance (2003–2008) =

The Meghalaya Democratic Alliance (MDA) was a coalition of political parties that formed the Government in the state of Meghalaya, India, after the 2003 Legislative Assembly election. It was headed by the Indian National Congress (INC), which was the party with the largest number of seats in the 7th Meghalaya Legislative Assembly. Chief Minister D. D. Lapang and the other ministers in the Government were all members of the MDA. D. D. Lapang also served as the Chairperson of the MDA.

== History ==
Meghalaya Nationalist Congress Party was political party that existed in Meghalaya, India in December 2003. It was formed by Cyprian Sangma on 15 December, when six out of 14 Nationalist Congress Party legislators broke away. Four of the six were immediately given cabinet berths in the D.D. Lapang government. On 21 December MNCP merged with the Indian National Congress.

After the 2003 elections to Legislative Assembly, INC Member of the Legislative Assembly (MLA) D. D. Lapang was elected the leader of the Congress Legislative Party (CLP).

The Nationalist Congress Party (NCP) first made a bid to form the Government, but they gave up when they were unable to provide the Governor M.M. Jacob with sufficient number of MLAs to prove majority in the Assembly.

The INC then formed the MDA along with other parties and independents opposed to the NCP and the Bharatiya Janata Party (BJP).

The MDA pledged to work for the state's economic development and also to provide stability of the government.

With 40 members in the 60 member Assembly, Governor M.M. Jacob invited the MDA to form the Government. D. D. Lapang was sworn in as Chief Minister on 4 March 2003.

== Initial support ==
At the time of its formation, the MDA included the following members:

- Indian National Congress (INC) (22 MLAs)
- United Democratic Party (UDP) (9 MLAs)
- Meghalaya Democratic Party (MDP) (4 MLAs)
- Khun Hynniewtrep National Awakening Movement (KHNAM) (2 MLAs)
- Independents (3 MLAs)

In addition, the Hill State People's Democratic Party (HPDP) had also expressed willingness to join the MDA, but their MLAs were not provided to the governor when the MDA staked its claim to form the Government.

D. D. Lapang (INC) served as the chairperson of the MDA while Dr. Donkupar Roy (UDP) served as the deputy chairperson. Martle Mukhim (MDP) served as the treasurer and R. G. Lyngdoh (INC) served as the spokesperson.

== Changes in constituents ==
Though the HPDP legislators were not in the initial list of legislators submitted to the governor, one of their MLAs Dr. F. A. Khonglam was sworn in as a minister on 4 March 2003. Effectively, this meant the MDA had additional support of 2 MLAs from HPDP, taking their total strength in the 60-member Assembly to 42.

Later in 2003, one additional independent joined the MDA, taking the total number of independents supporting the MDA to 4, and the total strength of the MDA to 43.

On 16 December 2003, 6 legislators from the opposition NCP broke away from their party and formed a new party called the Meghalaya Nationalist Congress Party (MNCP). They then joined the MDA coalition increasing the strength of the coalition to 49. 4 of the 6 MNCP legislatures were given ministerial positions in the MDA Government.

== Controversies ==
In mid-2004, after the 2004 Indian general election, the NCP joined the INC-led United Progressive Alliance (UPA) to form the Government of India. It was believed that this decision, might result in the MDA being disbanded with an INC-NCP combination to form the new Government in Meghalaya. However, on 31 May 2004, D. D. Lapang confirmed that the regional MDA coalition would not be affected by the new alliance at the central Government.

In mid-2006, internal conflicts with the Meghalaya Congress Legislative Party (CLP) led to D. D. Lapang resigning as the CLP leader and as the Chief Minister under orders from the Congress high command. His former protégé, J. D. Rymbai was elected new leader of the CLP and Chief Minister on 15 June 2006. Despite the leadership change, the internal conflicts continued with both Lapang and Rymbai claiming majority support in the CLP. After less than a year in-charge, Rymbai was directed by the Congress high command to relinquish the position to Lapang after a secret confidence vote determined that Rymbai no longer had majority support. After refusing to comply with the high command directive for 5 days, Rymbai finally resigned on 10 March 2007. Lapang was reelected as the CLP leader and was sworn in as Chief Minister on 10 March 2008.

== Demise of Alliance ==
In the lead up to the 2008 Meghalaya Legislative Assembly election all the regional parties forming the MDA decided to run against the INC. The UDP, MDP, KHNAM and HPDP fielded candidates against INC and made corruption and government failure as their main election issues to garner votes against the INC.

This effectively meant the quiet demise of the Meghalaya Democratic Alliance.

The MDA was effectively replaced by the Meghalaya Progressive Alliance (MPA) after the 2008 elections as INC tried to form the Government with support from independents.
