= Ampareen Lyngdoh =

Indian politician

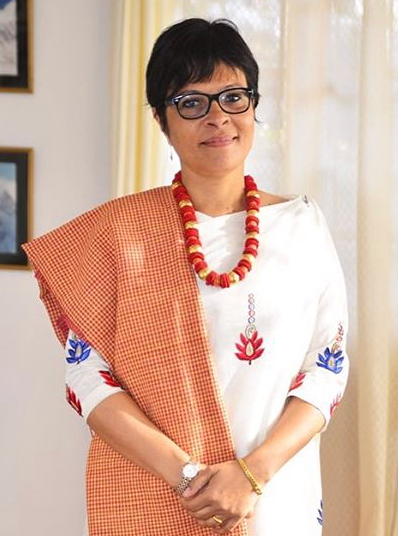
- Official portrait

Cabinet Minister, Government of Meghalaya
- In office 7 March 2023 – 16 September 2025
- Chief Minister: Conrad Sangma
- Portfolios: Agriculture and Farmers' Welfare; Health and Family Welfare; Information and Public Relations; Law
- Preceded by: Banteidor Lyngdoh (Agriculture); Prestone Tynsong (Health); James Sangma (Information, Law)
- Succeeded by: Timothy Shira (Agriculture); Wailadmiki Shylla (Health); Lahkmen Rymbui (Information, Law)
- In office 12 March 2013 – 6 March 2018
- Chief Minister: Mukul Sangma
- Portfolios: Labour; Urban Affairs, Municipal Administration (until 2016); Public Works Department (Buildings) (from 2016)
- In office 24 April 2010 – 1 March 2013
- Chief Minister: Mukul Sangma
- Portfolios: School Education and Literacy (until 2011); Higher and Technical Education (until 2011); Science and Technology (from 2011); Urban Affairs (from 2011); Municipal Administration and Housing (from 2011)
- In office 13 May 2009 – 19 April 2010
- Chief Minister: D. D. Lapang
- Portfolios: Elementary and Mass Education; Higher and Technical Education; Printing and Stationery

Member, Meghalaya Legislative Assembly
- Incumbent
- Assumed office 2013
- Preceded by: Constituency established
- Constituency: East Shillong
- In office 2008–2013
- Preceded by: Robert Garnett Lyngdoh
- Succeeded by: Constituency abolished
- Constituency: Laitumkhrah

Personal details
- Born: 5 May 1965 (age 61) Shillong, India
- Party: National People's Party (2022-present)
- Other political affiliations: United Democratic Party (2008–2009); Indian National Congress (2009–2022)
- Spouse: Fantin Joseph Lakadong
- Children: 3
- Parent: Peter G. Marbaniang (father)
- Education: Bachelor of Arts, Jesus and Mary College; Master of Arts, Jamia Millia Islamia; Ph.D., North Eastern Hill University.
- Alma mater: Loreto Convent, Shillong; Jesus & Mary College, University of Delhi; Jamia Milia Islamia; North Eastern Hill University (Ph.D)
- Occupation: Politician, former lecturer

Mazel Ampareen Lyngdoh (born 5 May 1965) is an Indian politician who has consecutively served as a legislator from the Indian state of Meghalaya since 2008. She serves as the Adviser to the Government of Meghalaya. Lyngdoh served as a Cabinet Minister in the Government of Meghalaya across multiple administrations, holding office at various times between 2009 and 2025.

During her tenure, she oversaw portfolios including Labour Affairs, Information Technology, Information & Broadcasting, Housing, and Urban Development between 2013 and 2018, and earlier served as Minister for Education from 2009 to 2013. More recently, her ministerial responsibilities have encompassed Health & Family Welfare, Agriculture & Farmers’ Welfare, and Information & Public Relations, where she was also the sole female minister in the MDA‑II government.

Notably, she was the only female member of the 60‑member Meghalaya Legislative Assembly from 2008 to 2013. Prior to entering active politics, she taught mass communication as a lecturer at St. Anthony’s College, Shillong.

== Early life and family ==
Ampareen Lyngdoh was born in Shillong. She is the daughter of Peter G. Marbaniang and Q. E. Lyngdoh.

Her father was a Member of Parliament (Lok Sabha) and Speaker of the Meghalaya Legislative Assembly, and also served as a minister in the state government.

Her late brother, Robert Garnett Lyngdoh, was a member of the Meghalaya Legislative Assembly and served as Home Minister in the Government of Meghalaya.

She is married and has three children.

== Education ==
Lyngdoh completed her school education at the Loreto Convent, Shillong.

She pursued her undergraduate degree in English at the Jesus and Mary College at the University of Delhi. She graduated from Jamia Milia Islamia University in 1990 with a master's degree in Mass Communication.

In 2013, Lyngdoh earned a Ph.D. from the North Eastern Hill University. The title of her thesis was Influence of Media on Public Opinion During The Periods of Social Unrest: A Study of Meghalaya.

== Early career ==
Lyngdoh was a lecturer of Mass Communications at St. Anthony's College, Shillong where she was the head of the Department of Mass Communication.

== Political career ==
She started her political career as a member of the Indian Youth Congress, and was closely involved in the election campaigns of her father, Peter G. Marbaniang and her brother Robert G. Lyngdoh before joining active politics. They were both leaders of the Indian National Congress.

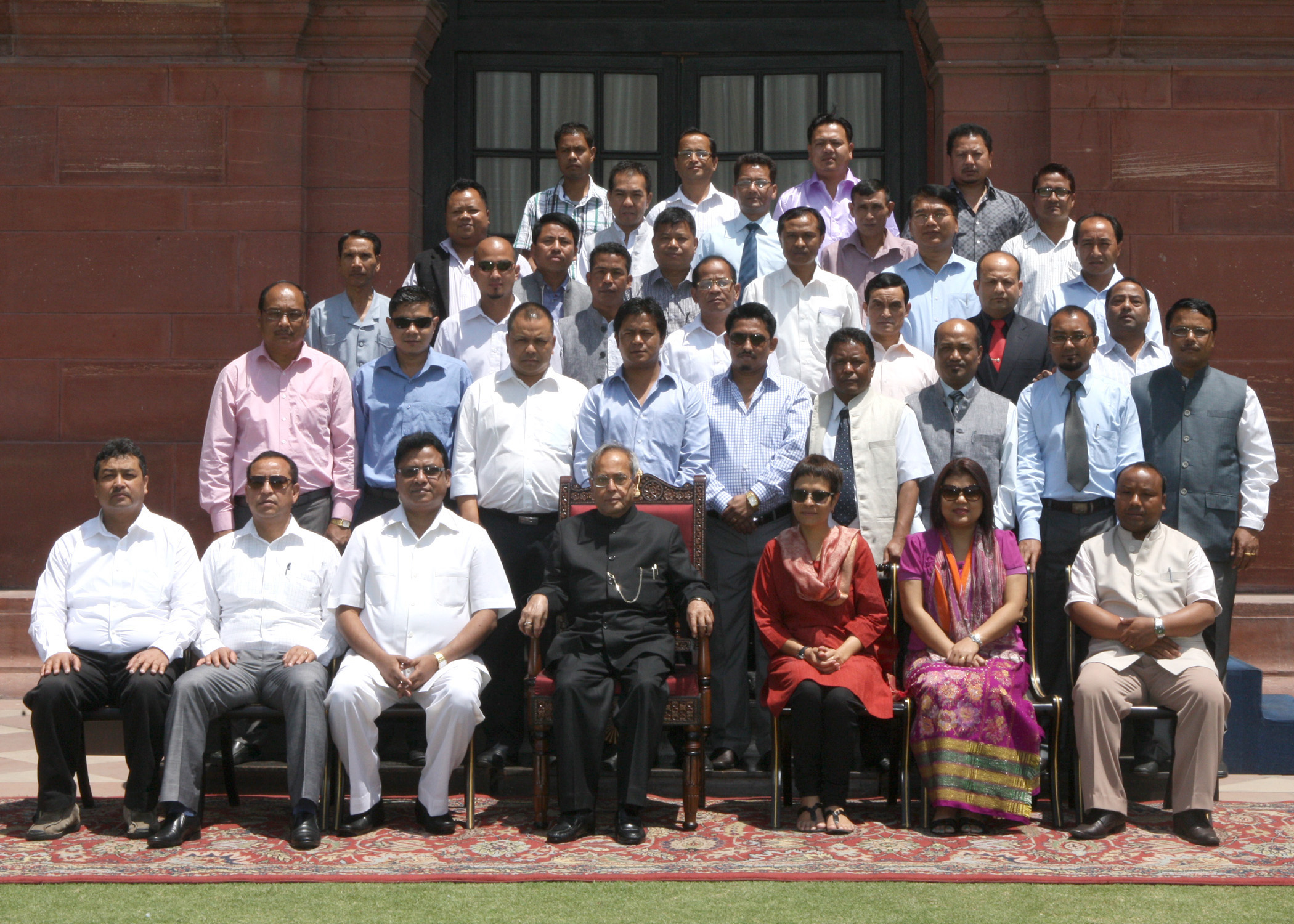
President Shri Pranab Mukherjee with the Speaker, Meghalaya Legislative Assembly, Shri A.T. Mondal and Ampareen Lyngdoh, Minister, Government of Meghalaya along with MLAs from Meghalaya, in New Delhi on 1 May 2013

=== United Democratic Party ===
Lyngdoh briefly joined the United Democratic Party (UDP) in 2008 after the Indian National Congress refused to give her a ticket to contest the 2008 state Assembly elections.

When the United Democratic Party gave her an election ticket, 44 members of the party resigned in protest because her brother Robert G Lyngdoh was a Congress legislator and the state's minister for education at that time.

As a candidate from the United Democratic Party, Lyngdoh won the 2008 state assembly elections from the Laitumkhrah constituency, a stronghold of her family from which her father and her brother had been elected earlier to become the only woman MLA in the 8th Meghalaya Legislative Assembly. She defeated Malcom B Tariang, who fought the election as an independent candidate.

=== Re-joining the Indian National Congress and subsequent suspension ===
Lyngdoh met Indian National Congress President Sonia Gandhi in New Delhi, after which she resigned from the United Democratic Party and the Meghalaya Legislative Assembly on 31 March 2009.

She re-joined the Congress, her party rewarding her by making her the state's minister for education, although she was no longer a legislator. Her resignation from the Assembly resulted in a by-election, which she won in August 2009. Once again, she defeated Tariang, who fought as a UDP candidate this time.

She was the only female legislator in the Meghalaya Assembly from 2008 to 2013. During these five years, her assets increased by 9000%, from ₹ 23,518 to ₹ 2,100,000, according to the affidavits she submitted to the Election Commission.

On 14 February 2022, Lyngdoh along with 4 other fellow Congress MLAs was suspended by the party for backing the BJP allied NPP state government.

== Positions in the Indian National Congress ==
Indian National Congress President Rahul Gandhi appointed Lyngdoh a secretary of the All India Congress Committee in charge of Mizoram ahead of the crucial state assembly election in 2018. She was appointed as the President of the Meghalaya chapter of the All India Professionals Congress in August 2018.

In August 2021, she was appointed as the working president of the Indian National Congress in Meghalaya.

In February 2022, a group of 5 Indian National Congress MLAs led by Ampareen Lyngdoh gave their support to the Conrad Sangma National People's Party Bharatiya Janata Party backed government. This resulted in an expulsion of all five last remaining Indian National Congress MLAs.

== Positions in government ==
Lyngdoh has served as a Cabinet Minister in the state government, and during her first two terms as a Cabinet Minister, she held portfolios including Public Works Department, Information Technology, Information & Communication, Urban Development, Housing, Labour, Education and Tourism. She was the Chairman of the Meghalaya Urban Development Agency while holding the Urban Development portfolio.

Following her re-election as a member of the Meghalaya Legislative Assembly in 2023, Lyngdoh was appointed as a Cabinet Minister in the Meghalaya Democratic Alliance 2.0 Government, she served in this position till 2025. Later, she was appointed as the Adviser to the Government of Meghalaya.

== Controversies ==
In 2017, the High Court of Meghalaya cancelled the appointment of teachers in government lower primary schools following allegations of irregularities in the 2010 selection process, which took place during Lyngdoh’s tenure as Minister for Education. The court also directed the Central Bureau of Investigation to examine the alleged irregularities.

In 2025, the High Court of Meghalaya quashed all charges against Lyngdoh, noting that “the prosecution has failed to establish even a prima facie case” against her.

== Electoral record ==
In 2008, Lyngdoh contested the State Assembly Elections from the Laitumkhrah constituency as a UDP candidate, which marked her first election to the state assembly.

In 2009, following her resignation from the constituency, she contested a by-election in the same Laitumkhrah constituency as an Indian National Congress candidate, and won again.

In 2013 she contested the East Shillong Constituency, defeating the UDP candidate and then Deputy Chief Minister Bindo M Lanong.

In 2018 Lyngdoh contested the East Shillong Constituency, once again winning the seat with a 36% margin. Her nearest rival from the Bharatiya Janata Party by over 6,000 votes. She once again defeated former Deputy Chief Minister Bindo M Lanong of the UDP.

She won in 2023, on a National People's Party ticket defeating Indian National Congress candidate Manuel Badwar by 1,711 votes.

Election	Year	Party	Constituency	Result	Votes	% votes	Source
Meghalaya Legislative Assembly	2008	United Democratic Party	Laitumkhrah	Won	3,775	34.10%	
Meghalaya Legislative Assembly (by-election)	2009	Indian National Congress	Laitumkhrah	Won	5,800	54.81%	
Meghalaya Legislative Assembly	2013	Indian National Congress	East Shillong	Won	10,103	62.9%	
Meghalaya Legislative Assembly	2018	Indian National Congress	East Shillong	Won	10,368	61.4%	
Meghalaya Legislative Assembly	2023	National People's Party (India)	East Shillong	Won	6,636	39.56%	
