= Jaiaw Assembly constituency =

Constituency of the Meghalaya legislative assembly in India

Jaiaw
- Former constituency for the Meghalaya Legislative Assembly

Constituency details
- Country: India
- Region: Northeast India
- State: Meghalaya
- Established: 1972
- Abolished: 2013
- Total electors: 14,933

Jaiaw Assembly constituency was an assembly constituency in the India state of Meghalaya.

== Members of the Legislative Assembly ==
Election	Member	Party
1972	P. Ripple Kyndiah	All Party Hill Leaders Conference
1978	P. Ripple Kyndiah	All Party Hill Leaders Conference
1983	P. Ripple Kyndiah	All Party Hill Leaders Conference
1988	P. Ripple Kyndiah	Indian National Congress
1993	A. H. Scott Lyngdoh	Hill People's Union
1998	A. H. Scott Lyngdoh	United Democratic Party
2003	Paul Lyngdoh	Khun Hynniewtrep National Awakening Movement
2008	Paul Lyngdoh	Khun Hynniewtrep National Awakening Movement

== Election results ==
=== Assembly Election 2008 ===
2008 Meghalaya Legislative Assembly election: Jaiaw
Party	Candidate	Votes	%	±%
KHNAM	Paul Lyngdoh	9,643	76.59%	▲19.32
INC	A. H. Scott Lyngdoh	2,948	23.41%	▲18.35
Margin of victory		6,695	53.17%	▲18.17
Turnout		12,591	84.32%	▲26.60
Registered electors		14,933		▼15.97
KHNAM hold		Swing	▲19.32	

=== Assembly Election 2003 ===
2003 Meghalaya Legislative Assembly election: Jaiaw
Party	Candidate	Votes	%	±%
KHNAM	Paul Lyngdoh	5,873	57.26%	New
HSPDP	Martamlin Pyrbot	2,283	22.26%	New
MDP	Aubry H.Scott Lyngdoh	1,347	13.13%	New
INC	R.Lover Shullai	519	5.06%	▼9.33
UDP	Maya R. Kyndiah	234	2.28%	▼43.36
Margin of victory		3,590	35.00%	▲13.90
Turnout		10,256	57.76%	▼4.85
Registered electors		17,771		▲14.53
KHNAM gain from UDP		Swing	▲11.63	

=== Assembly Election 1998 ===
1998 Meghalaya Legislative Assembly election: Jaiaw
Party	Candidate	Votes	%	±%
UDP	A. H. Scott Lyngdoh	4,430	45.64%	New
BJP	Martamlin Pyrbot	2,381	24.53%	▲1.90
Independent	Michael Nongjop Syiem	1,499	15.44%	New
INC	Maya R. Kyndiah	1,397	14.39%	▼3.93
Margin of victory		2,049	21.11%	▼13.47
Turnout		9,707	64.32%	▼4.52
Registered electors		15,517		▼6.17
UDP gain from HPU		Swing	▼11.57	

=== Assembly Election 1993 ===
1993 Meghalaya Legislative Assembly election: Jaiaw
Party	Candidate	Votes	%	±%
HPU	A. H. Scott Lyngdoh	6,346	57.21%	▲26.31
BJP	Martamlin Pyrbot	2,510	22.63%	New
INC	Maya Rani Kyndiah	2,032	18.32%	▼21.64
Independent	Leston Wanswett	205	1.85%	New
Margin of victory		3,836	34.58%	▲25.52
Turnout		11,093	68.44%	▼1.78
Registered electors		16,538		▲16.13
HPU gain from INC		Swing	▲17.25	

=== Assembly Election 1988 ===
1988 Meghalaya Legislative Assembly election: Jaiaw
Party	Candidate	Votes	%	±%
INC	P. Ripple Kyndiah	3,918	39.96%	▲19.24
HPU	A. H. Scott Lyngdoh	3,030	30.90%	New
HSPDP	Sain Manik Jyrwa	2,858	29.15%	▼5.22
Margin of victory		888	9.06%	▼1.50
Turnout		9,806	70.49%	▲0.86
Registered electors		14,241		▲6.05
INC gain from AHL		Swing		

=== Assembly Election 1983 ===
1983 Meghalaya Legislative Assembly election: Jaiaw
Party	Candidate	Votes	%	±%
AHL	P. Ripple Kyndiah	4,102	44.92%	▲12.78
HSPDP	Sain Manick Jyrwa	3,138	34.36%	▲12.22
INC	Maya R. Kyndiah	1,892	20.72%	New
Margin of victory		964	10.56%	▲3.59
Turnout		9,132	70.79%	▲0.20
Registered electors		13,429		▼3.11
AHL hold		Swing		

=== Assembly Election 1978 ===
1978 Meghalaya Legislative Assembly election: Jaiaw
Party	Candidate	Votes	%	±%
AHL	P. Ripple Kyndiah	3,020	32.14%	▼18.56
Independent	Sain Manik Jyrwa	2,365	25.17%	New
HSPDP	Wilford Lyngdoh	2,081	22.15%	New
CPI	Jokendro Lanong	964	10.26%	New
INC(I)	B. K. Biswas	513	5.46%	New
Independent	Neville Rufus Laitphlang	454	4.83%	New
Margin of victory		655	6.97%	▼2.36
Turnout		9,397	69.95%	▲10.77
Registered electors		13,860		▲61.01
AHL hold		Swing	▼18.56	

=== Assembly Election 1972 ===
1972 Meghalaya Legislative Assembly election: Jaiaw
Party	Candidate	Votes	%	±%
AHL	P. Ripple Kyndiah	2,489	50.70%	New
Independent	Ganoldmassar	2,031	41.37%	New
Independent	Ambrose B. M. Roy	389	7.92%	New
Margin of victory		458	9.33%	
Turnout		4,909	58.60%	
Registered electors		8,608		
AHL win (new seat)				
