= Balajied Kupar Synrem =

Indian politician

Member of Legislative Assembly Meghalaya
- Incumbent
- Assumed office 24 October 2019
- Preceded by: Donkupar Roy
- Constituency: Shella

Personal details
- Party: Bharatiya Janata Party
- Other political affiliations: United Democratic Party

Balajied Kupar Synrem (born 1989) is an Indian politician from Meghalaya. He is a member of the Meghalaya Legislative Assembly from Shella Assembly constituency, which is reserved for Scheduled Tribe community, in East Khasi Hills district as a member of the Bharatiya Janata Party. He was elected in the 2023 Meghalaya Legislative Assembly election representing the United Democratic Party (Meghalaya).

== Early life and education ==
Syiem is from Jamew, Shella village, East Khasi Hills district, Meghalaya. He is the son of, Donkupar Roy, a doctor and former chief minister of Meghalaya. He completed his LLB in 2015 at the Amity Institute of Advanced Legal Studies, Amity University, Uttar Pradesh in 2015. He also obtained an LLB in 2013 at Campus Law Center, New Delhi. He graduated in arts, in English honours, at Zakir Husain College, New Delhi in 2009. His wife is self-employed.

== Career ==
Syiem was elected from the Shella Assembly constituency representing the United Democratic Party in the 2023 Meghalaya Legislative Assembly election. He polled 13,274 votes and defeated his nearest rival, Grace Mary Kharpuri of the Nationalist People's Party, by a margin of 434 votes. He was first elected as a member of the Meghalaya Legislative Assembly from Shella on 24 October 2019.He was among the 8 UDP mlas who joined the Bharatiya Janata Party.
