= Laitumkhrah Assembly constituency =

Constituency of the Meghalaya legislative assembly in India

Laitumkharah
- Former constituency for the Meghalaya Legislative Assembly

Constituency details
- Country: India
- Region: Northeast India
- State: Meghalaya
- Established: 1972
- Abolished: 2013
- Total electors: 14,326

Laitumkharah Assembly constituency was an assembly constituency in the India state of Meghalaya.

== Members of the Legislative Assembly ==
Election	Member	Party
1972	Peter G. Mareaniang	All Party Hill Leaders Conference
1978	Peter G. Mareaniang	Indian National Congress
1983	Justin Khonglah	All Party Hill Leaders Conference
1988	Peter G. Mareaniang	Indian National Congress
1993	Justin Khonglah	Hill People's Union
1998	Robert Garnett Lyngdoh	Indian National Congress
2003	Robert Garnett Lyngdoh	Indian National Congress
2008	Dr. Mazel Ampareen Lyngdoh	United Democratic Party

== Election results ==
=== Assembly Election 2008 ===
2008 Meghalaya Legislative Assembly election: Laitumkharah
Party	Candidate	Votes	%	±%
UDP	Dr. Mazel Ampareen Lyngdoh	3,775	34.10%	▲16.71
Independent	Malcolm B. Tariang	2,182	19.71%	New
INC	Nicky F Lyngdoh	1,491	13.47%	▼40.87
MDP	Stevenson Bulbin Nongdhar	1,466	13.24%	▲9.89
BJP	John G. Soanes	926	8.36%	▼9.99
NCP	Paul Higgins Suting	854	7.71%	▲1.14
HSPDP	Romeo Phira Rani	319	2.88%	New
Margin of victory		1,593	14.39%	▼21.60
Turnout		11,071	77.28%	▲31.78
Registered electors		14,326		▼24.19
UDP gain from INC		Swing	▼20.24	

=== Assembly Election 2003 ===
2003 Meghalaya Legislative Assembly election: Laitumkharah
Party	Candidate	Votes	%	±%
INC	Robert Garnett Lyngdoh	4,672	54.34%	▲3.45
BJP	Dr. Werlok Kharshiing	1,578	18.35%	▲3.51
UDP	Barister Myrthong	1,495	17.39%	▼11.63
NCP	Vicky S. Lyngdoh	565	6.57%	New
MDP	Raynold Cavinson Diengdoh	288	3.35%	New
Margin of victory		3,094	35.99%	▲14.12
Turnout		8,598	45.52%	▼9.90
Registered electors		18,896		▲7.08
INC hold		Swing	▲3.45	

=== Assembly Election 1998 ===
1998 Meghalaya Legislative Assembly election: Laitumkharah
Party	Candidate	Votes	%	±%
INC	Robert Garnett Lyngdoh	4,975	50.89%	▲21.40
UDP	Margaret Rose Mawlong	2,837	29.02%	New
BJP	Lionaal Garnette Laloo	1,451	14.84%	▲1.79
HSPDP	Naramai Langstieh	285	2.92%	New
Independent	John G. Soanes	174	1.78%	New
Independent	Oral Synnah	54	0.55%	New
Margin of victory		2,138	21.87%	▲15.67
Turnout		9,776	56.74%	▼6.05
Registered electors		17,646		▲4.68
INC gain from HPU		Swing	▲15.20	

=== Assembly Election 1993 ===
1993 Meghalaya Legislative Assembly election: Laitumkharah
Party	Candidate	Votes	%	±%
HPU	Justin Khonglah	3,697	35.69%	▼6.39
INC	George M. War	3,055	29.49%	▼26.37
AHL(AM)	Stephan Min	1,834	17.70%	New
BJP	Ivoryna Shylla	1,352	13.05%	New
Independent	Raymond Ranee	226	2.18%	New
Independent	L. M. M. Kharpuri	172	1.66%	New
Independent	Micheal Kharshing	23	0.22%	New
Margin of victory		642	6.20%	▼7.58
Turnout		10,359	62.85%	▼1.51
Registered electors		16,857		▲37.46
HPU gain from INC		Swing	▼20.17	

=== Assembly Election 1988 ===
1988 Meghalaya Legislative Assembly election: Laitumkharah
Party	Candidate	Votes	%	±%
INC	Peter G. Mareaniang	4,313	55.86%	▲35.59
HPU	J. Khonglah	3,249	42.08%	New
HSPDP	L. Morrow M. Kharpuri	159	2.06%	▼32.42
Margin of victory		1,064	13.78%	▲5.60
Turnout		7,721	64.27%	▼2.37
Registered electors		12,263		▲15.17
INC gain from AHL		Swing		

=== Assembly Election 1983 ===
1983 Meghalaya Legislative Assembly election: Laitumkharah
Party	Candidate	Votes	%	±%
AHL	Justin Khonglah	2,968	42.66%	▲16.75
HSPDP	Peter G. Marbaniang	2,399	34.48%	New
INC	Tiplut Nongbri	1,410	20.27%	▼46.15
Independent	Kister Kharkongor	180	2.59%	New
Margin of victory		569	8.18%	▼32.32
Turnout		6,957	67.15%	▼0.16
Registered electors		10,648		▲16.30
AHL gain from INC		Swing	▼23.75	

=== Assembly Election 1978 ===
1978 Meghalaya Legislative Assembly election: Laitumkharah
Party	Candidate	Votes	%	±%
INC	Peter G. Mareaniang	3,983	66.42%	New
AHL	Alexander Warjri	1,554	25.91%	▼41.99
Independent	Weston Nonghulo	337	5.62%	New
INC(I)	Usha Bhattacharjee	123	2.05%	New
Margin of victory		2,429	40.50%	▲4.70
Turnout		5,997	67.61%	▲4.18
Registered electors		9,156		▲24.62
INC gain from AHL		Swing	▼1.49	

=== Assembly Election 1972 ===
1972 Meghalaya Legislative Assembly election: Laitumkharah
Party	Candidate	Votes	%	±%
AHL	Peter G. Mareaniang	3,059	67.90%	New
Independent	Pranesh Chandra Biswas	1,446	32.10%	New
Margin of victory		1,613	35.80%	
Turnout		4,505	63.69%	
Registered electors		7,347		
AHL win (new seat)				
