= 2008 Meghalaya Legislative Assembly election =

- 3 Mar 2008

59 seats in the Assembly
- Turnout: 89.84%

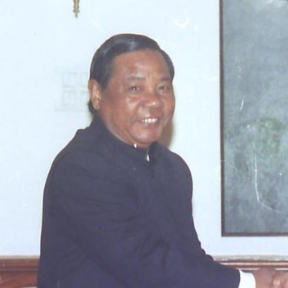
	Majority party	Minority party
Leader	Mukul Sangma	P. A. Sangma
Party	INC	NCP
Last election	22	14
Seats won	25	14
Seat change	▲3	Steady
Popular vote	362,617	221,341
Percentage	32.90%	24.32%
Swing	▲2.94%	0.98%
Chief Minister before election
D. D. Lapang
INC
Chief Minister
Donkupar Roy
UDP

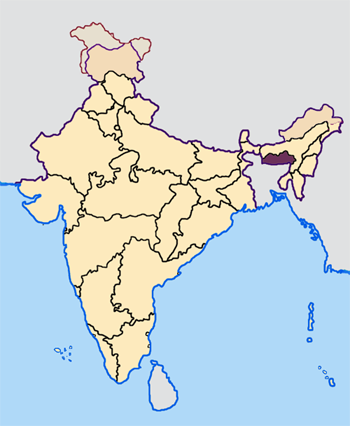
Meghalaya

The Meghalaya Legislative Assembly election of 2008 took place in a single phase on 3 March 2008 to elect the Members of the Legislative Assembly (MLA) from each of the 60 Assembly Constituencies (ACs) in Meghalaya, India. Counting of votes happened on 7 March 2008 and because of the use of Electronic Voting Machines (EVMs) in this election, the results were ready within the day.

The ruling coalition Meghalaya Democratic Alliance (MDA) had broken apart in the lead-up to this election, forcing the main partner Indian National Congress (INC) to take on their erstwhile partners including United Democratic Party (UDP) and Meghalaya Democratic Party (MDP) who had decided to fight against the INC on the basis on corruption charges against the incumbent Government.

The election provided a hung verdict and both the incumbent INC and the post-election coalition of NCP-UDP (who called themselves the Meghalaya Progressive Alliance (MPA) staked claim with the Governor of Meghalaya M.M. Jacob to form the next Government of Meghalaya. By virtue of being the single largest party in this election, winning 25 of the total 60 seats, the incumbent Chief Minister D. D. Lapang of the INC was invited by the Governor to form the new Government on 10 March 2008. However, the Lapang Government was unable to get enough support in the Meghalaya Legislative Assembly and the Chief Minister resigned 9 days later ahead of the vote of confidence scheduled for 20 March 2008. The Governor then invited the head of the UDP Donkupar Roy to form the Government with the support of the MPA coalition who claimed support of 31 of the 60 seats in the Assembly. This included 14 seats from NCP, 11 from UDP, 2 from Hill State People's Democratic Party(HPDP), 1 from Bharatiya Janata Party (BJP), 1 from Khun Hynniewtrep National Awakening Movement (KHNAM) and 2 independents

== Background ==
The previous elections to the 7th Meghalaya Legislative Assembly was held in 2003 and the term for this Assembly was set to expire on 10 March 2008. Hence, the Election Commission of India (ECI) announced fresh elections to the 8th Meghalaya Legislative Assembly on 14 January 2008. Of the 60 ACs in Tripura, 55 are reserved for Scheduled Tribes. Elections in all polling stations were held using EVMs.

After the 2003 elections to the 7th Meghalaya Legislative Assembly, the INC led MDA formed the Government under the leadership of INC's D. D. Lapang. The members of the MDA were INC (22 seats), UDP (9 seats), Meghalaya Democratic Party (MDP) (4 seats) and 3 independents. By 2006, Lapang faced revolt within the INC and the party took the decision to replace him as the Chief Minister. On 15 June 2006, Lapang resigned and his protégé J. D. Rymbai was sworn in as the new Chief Minister by the Governor of Manipur S. S. Sidhu, who administered the oath of office on behalf of Governor M. M. Jacob who was on leave. However, the conflict within the INC did not end there and both Lapang and Rymbai continued to claim majority support among the Congress Legislative Party (CLP). After 8 months in control of the Government, Rymbai was asked by the Congress high command to resign. Lapang was reelected as the leader of the Meghalaya CLP and was reinstated as Chief Minister by Governor M. M. Jacob on 10 March 2007. This time Lapang held onto the post until the completion of the term of the 7th Meghalaya Assembly.

== Parties contested ==
Party	Flag	Symbol	Leader	Seats contested
Indian National Congress			Mukul Sangma	59
Meghalaya United Democratic Party			Donkupar Roy	53
Nationalist Congress Party			P. A. Sangma	49
Bharatiya Janata Party			Rajnath Singh	23
Lok Jan Shakti Party			Ram Vilas Paswan	18
Meghalaya Democratic Party				18
Khun Hynniewtrep National Awakening Movement				16
Hill State People's Democratic Party				15
Garo National Council				4
Communist Party of India			A. B. Bardhan	3

== Campaign ==
In this election the INC was battling not just the Bharatiya Janata Party (BJP), but also its former MDA partners UDP and MDP. In addition, the NCP, a United Progressive Alliance (UPA) partner at the Centre, was also contesting against the INC in Meghalaya. Under the leadership of P. A. Sangma (who gave up national politics in favour of state politics before the elections), the NCP was expected to provide the most stiff competition to the INC.

Elections in the constituency of Baghmara were postponed to 22 March 2008 on count of the death of the sitting INC MLA S. Sangma.

A total of 331 candidates contested the remaining 59 seats up for election. Romgram had the toughest fight with 11 contestants, while Jaiaw had only 2 contestants.

== Election Day ==
Election Day (3 March 2008) was largely peaceful across the state. However, there was one incident of violence that claimed the life of an INC worker when clashes broke out between supporters of INC & NCP at Selsella in the Garo Hills area of the state.

Voter turnout of 89.05% was a record for the state. High voter turnout was reported from almost all rural constituencies. Voter turnout for the Baghmara seat on 22 Mar 2008 was 88.50%. Combined voter turnout across the state was 89.44%.

== Results ==
Performance of the political parties in this election
Party	Seats contested	Seats won	No. of Votes	% of Votes	% in Seats contested	Seats Forfeited	2003 Seats
Bharatiya Janata Party	23	1	29,465	2.71%	7.04%	21	
Communist Party of India	3	0	282	0.03%	0.53%	3	
Indian National Congress	59	25	357,113	32.88%	32.88%	9	
Nationalist Congress Party	49	14	221,341	20.38%	24.32%	15	
Lok Janshakti Party	18	0	6,827	0.63%	2.02%	18	
Meghalaya Democratic Party	18	0	30,691	2.83%	8.82%	15	
United Democratic Party	53	11	201,976	18.37%	20.49%	21	
Garo National Council	4	0	4,081	0.38%	6.65%	3	
Hill State People's Democratic Party	15	2	42,235	3.89%	13.97%	10	
Khun Hynniewtrep National Awakening Movement	16	1	48,833	4.50%	16.88%	9	
Independents	73	5	143,122	13.18%	25.22%	55	
Total	331	59	1,085,966			179	

Note: The above results are only for 59 seats. The results of Baghmara constituency is not included as elections in Baghmara were postponed.

== Elected members ==
Winner, runner-up, voter turnout, and victory margin in every constituency
Assembly Constituency		Turnout	Winner				Runner Up				Margin
#k	Names	%	Candidate	Party	Votes	%	Candidate	Party	Votes	%	Margin
1	War-Jaintia	92.42%	Lahkmen Rymbui	INC	6,896	36.4%	Rianglenon Tariang	UDP	5,996	31.65%	900
2	Rymbai	90.74%	Nehlang Lyngdoh	INC	12,893	47.9%	Simon Siangshai	NCP	5,856	21.76%	7,037
3	Sutnga-Shangpung	92.13%	Shitlang Pale	INC	9,814	50.99%	Richard Singh Lyngdoh	UDP	7,938	41.24%	1,876
4	Raliang	95.91%	Comingone Ymbon	INC	12,756	55.45%	Mihsalan Suchiang	UDP	6,913	30.05%	5,843
5	Nartiang	94.15%	E. C. Boniface Bamon	NCP	7,120	35.4%	Draison Kharshiing	INC	6,669	33.15%	451
6	Nongbah-Wahiajer	95.31%	Sniawbhalang Dhar	INC	8,452	40.94%	Thawain Plain	UDP	6,973	33.78%	1,479
7	Jowai	92.16%	Dr. Roytre Christopher Laloo	INC	7,712	40.15%	Singh Mulieh	UDP	7,119	37.06%	593
8	Mawhati	93.2%	Donbok Khymdeit	UDP	6,112	30.8%	Phingwel Muktieh	INC	5,725	28.85%	387
9	Umroi	91.13%	E. K. Mawlong	UDP	10,226	43.4%	Stanlywiss Rymbai	INC	9,261	39.3%	965
10	Nongpoh	90.74%	Dr. D. D. Lapang	INC	10,974	50.68%	Dr. Celestine Lyngdoh	UDP	10,254	47.35%	720
11	Jirang	88.15%	J. Dringwell Rymbai	UDP	5,830	26.85%	William Mynsong	INC	4,350	20.03%	1,480
12	Mairang	92.55%	Metbah Lyngdoh	UDP	10,642	44.4%	Boldness L. Nongrum	INC	8,768	36.58%	1,874
13	Nongspung	91.96%	J. Antonius Lyngdoh	UDP	7,896	41.79%	Kennedy Cornelius Khyriem	INC	7,149	37.84%	747
14	Sohiong	93.79%	H. Donkupar R. Lyngdoh	INC	8,500	38.03%	Rain Augustine Lyngdoh	UDP	6,827	30.55%	1,673
15	Mylliem	86.86%	Ronnie V. Lyngdoh	INC	9,130	47.45%	Pynshai Manik Syiem	NCP	7,714	40.09%	1,416
16	Malki-Nongthymmai	79.92%	Bindo Lanong	UDP	5,029	31.58%	Tony Curtis Lyngdoh	INC	4,166	26.16%	863
17	Laitumkhrah	77.28%	Dr. Mazel Ampareen Lyngdoh	UDP	3,775	34.1%	Malcolm B. Tariang	Independent	2,182	19.71%	1,593
18	Pynthorumkhrah	80.58%	Alexander Laloo Hek	BJP	13,086	62.55%	James Marvin Pariat	NCP	4,527	21.64%	8,559
19	Jaiaw	84.32%	Paul Lyngdoh	KHNAM	9,643	76.59%	A. H. Scott Lyngdoh	INC	2,948	23.41%	6,695
20	Mawkhar	79.89%	Dr. Friday Lyngdoh	INC	2,413	38.73%	Ganold Stone Massar	UDP	1,836	29.47%	577
21	Mawprem	79.75%	Manas Chaudhuri	Independent	7,833	52.19%	Binod Kr Joshi	INC	5,155	34.35%	2,678
22	Laban	81.05%	Sanbor Shullai	NCP	4,741	44.59%	Edward L Kharwanlang	BJP	2,303	21.66%	2,438
23	Mawlai	85.55%	Founder Strong Cajee	INC	12,490	53.59%	Process T. Sawkmie	UDP	9,411	40.38%	3,079
24	Sohryngkham	87.39%	Charles Pyngrope	INC	9,639	46.99%	Dr. Osaphi Smithson Jyrwa	KHNAM	5,458	26.61%	4,181
25	Dienglieng	94.12%	Remington Pyngrope	UDP	4,525	27.67%	Martle N Mukhim	MDP	4,459	27.26%	66
26	Nongkrem	90.24%	Ardent Miller Basaiawmoit	UDP	4,845	23.81%	Lambor Malngiang	KHNAM	4,128	20.29%	717
27	Langkyrdem	90.39%	Prestone Tynsong	INC	7,356	41.87%	Dominic Roblin Nongkynrih	KHNAM	6,553	37.3%	803
28	Nongshken	92.09%	Don Kupar Massar	Independent	5,522	37.86%	Khan Khong Dkhar	INC	4,550	31.19%	972
29	Sohra	91.%	Dr. Phlour W. Khongjee	INC	4,579	29.5%	Titosstar Well Chyne	UDP	4,107	26.46%	472
30	Shella	89.99%	Dr. Donkupar Roy	UDP	4,238	41.87%	Leston Wanswett	INC	3,299	32.59%	939
31	Mawsynram	91.17%	Pynshngainlang Syiem	INC	4,859	30.37%	Khrawkupar Jyrwa	NCP	4,601	28.76%	258
32	Mawkyrwat	92.23%	Rowell Lyngdoh	INC	5,838	32.03%	Enbin Kharraswai	HSPDP	4,510	24.75%	1,328
33	Pariong	93.49%	Dr. Adviser Pariong	HSPDP	8,225	50.18%	Irin Lyngdoh	INC	7,199	43.92%	1,026
34	Nongstoin	79.71%	Hopingstone Lyngdoh	HSPDP	10,537	37.78%	David Hamar Marwein	Independent	4,949	17.74%	5,588
35	Langrin	91.25%	Martin M. Danggo	INC	9,100	46.89%	Khranglin Lyngkhoi	UDP	5,026	25.9%	4,074
36	Mawthengkut	88.62%	Francis Pondit R. Sangma	INC	6,451	31.35%	K. Phlasting Well Pangniang	HSPDP	4,126	20.05%	2,325
37	Baghmara	88.5%	Satto R. Marak	NCP	7,419	45.88%	Arjun W. Momin	INC	5,504	34.04%	1,915
38	Rongrenggiri	85.84%	Marcuise N. Marak	NCP	11,942	46.65%	Debora C. Marak	INC	8,581	33.52%	3,361
39	Rongjeng	88.84%	Desang M.Sangma	NCP	7,891	49.48%	Sengnam Marak	INC	4,580	28.72%	3,311
40	Kharkutta	89.9%	Omillo K.Sangma	NCP	6,424	33.33%	Rupert Momin	Independent	6,117	31.74%	307
41	Mendipathar	90.66%	Frankenstein W. Momin	INC	4,647	23.37%	Beninstand G. Momin	UDP	4,461	22.43%	186
42	Resubelpara	90.05%	Timothy Shira	NCP	7,884	45.44%	Salseng C. Marak	INC	7,592	43.76%	292
43	Songsak	92.67%	Nihim D. Shira	NCP	5,687	33.15%	Tonsing N Marak	INC	5,357	31.23%	330
44	Bajengdoba	93.12%	John Manner Marak	NCP	7,084	40.67%	Chamberline B. Marak	INC	5,938	34.09%	1,146
45	Tikrikilla	89.2%	Limison Sangma	Independent	5,583	35.29%	Nagendra Rabha	Independent	4,576	28.92%	1,007
46	Dadenggre	91.91%	Augustine D.Marak	INC	8,401	39.32%	Edmund K.Sangma	NCP	7,176	33.58%	1,225
47	Rongchugiri	95.36%	James Pangsang Kongkal Sangma	NCP	5,877	41.82%	Beckster Sangma	INC	4,439	31.59%	1,438
48	Phulbari	90.43%	Abu Taher Mondal	Independent	7,492	32.11%	Manirul Islam Sarkar	INC	5,074	21.75%	2,418
49	Rajabala	92.33%	Sayeedullah Nongrum	INC	7,970	38.04%	Ashahel D. Shira	NCP	6,308	30.11%	1,662
50	Selsella	92.68%	Conrad Sangma	NCP	5,648	42.66%	Clement Marak	INC	4,254	32.13%	1,394
51	Rongram	90.41%	Ismail R. Marak	Independent	5,260	29.19%	Sengman R. Marak	INC	3,726	20.68%	1,534
52	Tura	77.41%	Purno Agitok Sangma	NCP	10,881	35.41%	Billy Kid A. Sangma	Independent	8,056	26.22%	2,825
53	Chokpot	91.75%	Masonsing Sangma	NCP	3,888	26.46%	Clifford Marak	GNC	2,935	19.97%	953
54	Kherapara	92.11%	Phillipole Marak	NCP	9,587	58.86%	Brening Sangma	INC	5,371	32.97%	4,216
55	Dalu	91.32%	Samuel Sangma	INC	4,886	35.54%	Nityanarayan Smchang	Independent	4,606	33.5%	280
56	Dalamgiri	94.32%	Saleng Sangma	INC	6,900	47.3%	Admiral K. Sangma	NCP	5,786	39.66%	1,114
57	Rangsakona	94.68%	Adolf Lu Hitler Marak	NCP	8,193	54.01%	Zenith Sangma	INC	6,354	41.89%	1,839
58	Ampatigiri	90.53%	Dr. Mukul Sangma	INC	10,626	55.47%	Clement G. Momin	NCP	7,660	39.99%	2,966
59	Salmanpara	90.15%	Nimarson Momin	UDP	5,632	32.22%	Boston Marak	Independent	4,895	28.01%	737
60	Mahendraganj	91.58%	Abdus Saleh	INC	7,017	43.32%	Nidhu Ram Hajong	Independent	6,143	37.92%	874
