= Shella Assembly constituency =

Legislative Assembly constituency in Meghalaya State, India

Coordinates: 25.18°N 91.64°E

Shella
- Constituency No. 26 for the Meghalaya Legislative Assembly

Constituency details
- Country: India
- Region: Northeast India
- State: Meghalaya
- District: East Khasi Hills
- Lok Sabha constituency: Shillong
- Established: 1972
- Total electors: 34,682
- Reservation: ST

Member of Legislative Assembly
- 11th Meghalaya Legislative Assembly
- Incumbent Balajied Kupar Synrem
- Party: BJP
- Alliance: NDA
- Elected year: 2023

Shella is one of the 60 Legislative Assembly constituencies of Meghalaya state in India. It is part of East Khasi Hills district and is reserved for candidates belonging to the Scheduled Tribes. It falls under Shillong Lok Sabha constituency.

== Members of the Legislative Assembly ==
Election	Member	Party
1972	Stanely D D Nochols Roy	All Party Hill Leaders Conference
1978	Stanely D D Nochols Roy	All Party Hill Leaders Conference
1983	S. Galmendar Singh Lyngdoh	All Party Hill Leaders Conference
1988	Dr. Donkupar Roy	Independent politician
1993	Dr. Donkupar Roy	Independent politician
1998	Dr. Donkupar Roy	United Democratic Party
2003	Dr. Donkupar Roy	United Democratic Party
2008	Dr. Donkupar Roy	United Democratic Party
2013	Dr. Donkupar Roy	United Democratic Party
2018	Dr. Donkupar Roy	United Democratic Party
2019 By-election	Balajied Kupar Synrem (Note: Elected as United Democratic Party. Switched to BJP in Sept 2026)	United Democratic Party
2023	Balajied Kupar Synrem	United Democratic Party

== Election results ==
=== Assembly Election 2023 ===
2023 Meghalaya Legislative Assembly election: Shella
Party	Candidate	Votes	%	±%
UDP	Balajied Kupar Synrem	13,274	43.87%	▼4.12
NPP	Grace Mary Kharpuri	12,840	42.44%	New
BJP	Arena Hynniewta	2,670	8.82%	▲5.86
AITC	Playness Khiewtam	882	2.91%	New
INC	Wellborn Bynnud	592	1.96%	▼4.90
NOTA	None of the Above	358	1.18%	▲0.43
Margin of victory		434	1.43%	▼23.44
Turnout		30,258	87.24%	▲3.31
Registered electors		34,682		▲16.39
UDP hold		Swing	▼4.12	

=== Assembly By-election 2019 ===
2019 Meghalaya Legislative Assembly by-election: Shella
Party	Candidate	Votes	%	±%
UDP	Balajied Kupar Synrem	12,002	47.99%	▲15.27
Independent	Grace Mary Kharpuri	5,781	23.11%	New
PDF	Mosjo Rock F. Wanswett	4,327	17.30%	▼13.95
INC	Batyngshain Laitmon Ryngnga	1,715	6.86%	▼10.26
BJP	Joshua Warjri	742	2.97%	▼10.43
Independent	Komen Laitmon	444	1.78%	New
NOTA	None of the Above	188	0.75%	▼0.02
Margin of victory		6,221	24.87%	▲23.41
Turnout		25,011	84.54%	▼3.22
Registered electors		29,797		▲2.61
UDP hold		Swing	▲15.27	

=== Assembly Election 2018 ===
2018 Meghalaya Legislative Assembly election: Shella
Party	Candidate	Votes	%	±%
UDP	Dr. Donkupar Roy	8,280	32.71%	▲0.54
PDF	Leston Wanswett	7,910	31.25%	New
INC	Batyngshain Laitmon Ryngnga	4,332	17.12%	▲1.52
BJP	Jrop Singh Nongkhlaw	3,390	13.39%	New
NPP	Sainkupar Riahtam	484	1.91%	New
Independent	Wellborn Bynnud	456	1.80%	New
NOTA	None of the Above	195	0.77%	New
Margin of victory		370	1.46%	▼0.46
Turnout		25,311	87.16%	▼1.21
Registered electors		29,040		▲38.98
UDP hold		Swing	▲0.54	

=== Assembly Election 2013 ===
2013 Meghalaya Legislative Assembly election: Shella
Party	Candidate	Votes	%	±%
UDP	Dr. Donkupar Roy	5,940	32.17%	▼9.70
Independent	Leston Wanswett	5,585	30.25%	New
Independent	Grace Mary Kharpuri	3,527	19.10%	New
INC	Jrop Singh Nongkhlaw	2,880	15.60%	▼17.00
Independent	K. Mechaldo Roy Khylleb	533	2.89%	New
Margin of victory		355	1.92%	▼7.35
Turnout		18,465	88.37%	▼1.62
Registered electors		20,895		▲85.77
UDP hold		Swing	▼9.70	

=== Assembly Election 2008 ===
2008 Meghalaya Legislative Assembly election: Shella
Party	Candidate	Votes	%	±%
UDP	Dr. Donkupar Roy	4,238	41.87%	▲8.94
INC	Leston Wanswett	3,299	32.59%	▲9.85
KHNAM	Pyndapborthiaw Saibon	2,585	25.54%	▼5.07
Margin of victory		939	9.28%	▲6.95
Turnout		10,122	89.99%	▲23.85
Registered electors		11,248		▼22.10
UDP hold		Swing		

=== Assembly Election 2003 ===
2003 Meghalaya Legislative Assembly election: Shella
Party	Candidate	Votes	%	±%
UDP	Dr. Donkupar Roy	3,145	32.93%	▼11.45
KHNAM	Pyndapborthiaw Saibon	2,923	30.61%	New
INC	G. Granderson Syiemlieh	2,172	22.74%	▼12.10
Independent	Kondro K. Ksanlam	1,046	10.95%	New
HSPDP	Bisanling Dkhar	227	2.38%	▲1.78
NCP	Porimor Shonglait	37	0.39%	New
Margin of victory		222	2.32%	▼7.22
Turnout		9,550	66.15%	▲2.34
Registered electors		14,439		▲8.37
UDP hold		Swing	▼11.45	

=== Assembly Election 1998 ===
1998 Meghalaya Legislative Assembly election: Shella
Party	Candidate	Votes	%	±%
UDP	Dr. Donkupar Roy	3,773	44.38%	New
INC	G.Granderson Syiemlieh	2,962	34.84%	▲3.35
PDM	Douglas Wahlang	1,715	20.17%	New
HSPDP	Neki Decruse Wanbah	51	0.60%	New
Margin of victory		811	9.54%	▲2.15
Turnout		8,501	65.03%	▼5.41
Registered electors		13,324		▼8.19
UDP gain from Independent		Swing	▲5.50	

=== Assembly Election 1993 ===
1993 Meghalaya Legislative Assembly election: Shella
Party	Candidate	Votes	%	±%
Independent	Dr. Donkupar Roy	3,905	38.88%	New
INC	G. Granderson Syemlieh	3,163	31.49%	▲15.45
PDC	S. G. Lyngdoh	1,601	15.94%	▲0.55
Janata Dal (B)	Douglas Wahlang	1,375	13.69%	New
Margin of victory		742	7.39%	▲1.89
Turnout		10,044	70.02%	▼4.12
Registered electors		14,512		▲39.90
Independent hold		Swing	▲11.14	

=== Assembly Election 1988 ===
1988 Meghalaya Legislative Assembly election: Shella
Party	Candidate	Votes	%	±%
Independent	Dr. Donkupar Roy	2,110	27.74%	New
HPU	S. Galmender Singh Lyngdoh	1,692	22.24%	New
INC	R. Wester Tiewsoh	1,220	16.04%	▼1.01
PDC	Saittish Wanswet	1,171	15.39%	▼12.72
HSPDP	Ednellson Diengdoh	986	12.96%	▲0.70
Independent	K. Medhi Warjri	428	5.63%	New
Margin of victory		418	5.49%	▲0.66
Turnout		7,607	74.16%	▲6.92
Registered electors		10,373		▲3.85
Independent gain from APHLC		Swing	▼5.22	

=== Assembly Election 1983 ===
1983 Meghalaya Legislative Assembly election: Shella
Party	Candidate	Votes	%	±%
APHLC	S. Galmendar Singh Lyngdoh	2,186	32.96%	▼3.90
PDC	R. Wester Tiewsoh	1,865	28.12%	New
INC	J. S. Jitem	1,131	17.05%	▼4.26
HSPDP	Stad Rai Synrem	813	12.26%	▼2.97
Independent	L. Morrow Mohon Kharpuri	270	4.07%	New
Independent	Onder-Stand Ajar	185	2.79%	New
Independent	Laston Wanswett	183	2.76%	New
Margin of victory		321	4.84%	▼8.37
Turnout		6,633	68.70%	▲2.41
Registered electors		9,988		▲8.38
APHLC hold		Swing	▼3.90	

=== Assembly Election 1978 ===
1978 Meghalaya Legislative Assembly election: Shella
Party	Candidate	Votes	%	±%
APHLC	Stanely D D Nochols Roy	2,174	36.86%	▼21.11
Independent	R. Wester Tiewsoh	1,395	23.65%	New
INC	J. S. Jitem	1,257	21.31%	New
HSPDP	Syrtok Singh Nangrum	898	15.23%	New
Independent	Jostiphilton Rapthap	76	1.29%	New
Independent	U. L. L. D. Basan	73	1.24%	New
Independent	Thiawwellson Roy	25	0.42%	New
Margin of victory		779	13.21%	▼13.35
Turnout		5,898	65.36%	▲6.89
Registered electors		9,216		▲9.04
APHLC hold		Swing	▼21.11	

=== Assembly Election 1972 ===
1972 Meghalaya Legislative Assembly election: Shella
Party	Candidate	Votes	%	±%
APHLC	Stanely D D Nochols Roy	2,798	57.97%	New
Independent	Pros Erly Chandra Chyne	1,516	31.41%	New
Independent	Joid Singh Kitem	305	6.32%	New
Independent	Jubor Singh Shongwan	208	4.31%	New
Margin of victory		1,282	26.56%	
Turnout		4,827	58.25%	
Registered electors		8,452		
APHLC win (new seat)				

== See also ==
- List of constituencies of the Meghalaya Legislative Assembly
- Shillong (Lok Sabha constituency)
- East Khasi Hills district
