= Dienglieng Assembly constituency =

Constituency of the Meghalaya legislative assembly in India

Dienglieng
- Former constituency for the Meghalaya Legislative Assembly

Constituency details
- Country: India
- Region: Northeast India
- State: Meghalaya
- Established: 1972
- Abolished: 2013
- Total electors: 17,376

Dienglieng Assembly constituency was an assembly constituency in the India state of Meghalaya.

== Members of the Legislative Assembly ==
Election	Member	Party
1972	Beterson Kharkongor	All Party Hill Leaders Conference
1978	Jungai Khongjoh	Indian National Congress
1983	Medistar Warbah	Public Demands Implementation Convention
1988	Martle N Mukhim	Public Demands Implementation Convention
1993	Martle N Mukhim	Public Demands Implementation Convention
1998	Martle N Mukhim	United Democratic Party
2003	Martle N Mukhim	Meghalaya Democratic Party
2008	Remington Pyngrope	United Democratic Party

== Election results ==
=== Assembly Election 2008 ===
2008 Meghalaya Legislative Assembly election: Dienglieng
Party	Candidate	Votes	%	±%
UDP	Remington Pyngrope	4,525	27.67%	▲8.45
MDP	Martle N Mukhim	4,459	27.26%	▼14.52
NCP	Drosingh Khongjoh	3,882	23.74%	▲21.64
INC	Teilang S Blah	3,230	19.75%	▲8.22
Khun Hynnieutrip National Awakaning Movement	Edarstar Lyngdoh Nongbri	259	1.58%	▼20.55
Margin of victory		66	0.40%	▼19.25
Turnout		16,355	94.12%	▲21.71
Registered electors		17,376		▲0.38
UDP gain from MDP		Swing	▼14.12	

=== Assembly Election 2003 ===
2003 Meghalaya Legislative Assembly election: Dienglieng
Party	Candidate	Votes	%	±%
MDP	Martle N Mukhim	5,238	41.79%	New
KHNAM	Teilang S Blah	2,775	22.14%	New
UDP	Chandra L.Nongbri	2,409	19.22%	▼27.29
INC	Grosswell Mylliemngap	1,445	11.53%	▼23.61
Khasi Farmers Democratic Party	Lampharang E. Lyngdoh	405	3.23%	New
NCP	Rolan Singh Nongrum	263	2.10%	New
Margin of victory		2,463	19.65%	▲8.28
Turnout		12,535	72.41%	▲0.14
Registered electors		17,310		▲2.89
MDP gain from UDP		Swing	▼4.72	

=== Assembly Election 1998 ===
1998 Meghalaya Legislative Assembly election: Dienglieng
Party	Candidate	Votes	%	±%
UDP	Martle N Mukhim	5,655	46.51%	New
INC	Medistar Warbah	4,273	35.14%	▼8.23
Independent	D. Khlur Baiaineh Mukhim	2,118	17.42%	New
Independent	Winstonely Marbaniang	113	0.93%	New
Margin of victory		1,382	11.37%	▼1.89
Turnout		12,159	74.12%	▼4.84
Registered electors		16,823		▼2.16
UDP gain from PDC		Swing	▼10.12	

=== Assembly Election 1993 ===
1993 Meghalaya Legislative Assembly election: Dienglieng
Party	Candidate	Votes	%	±%
PDC	Martle N Mukhim	7,508	56.63%	▲3.47
INC	Medister Warbah	5,751	43.37%	▲12.57
Margin of victory		1,757	13.25%	▼9.10
Turnout		13,259	78.78%	▼0.54
Registered electors		17,194		▲22.19
PDC hold		Swing		

=== Assembly Election 1988 ===
1988 Meghalaya Legislative Assembly election: Dienglieng
Party	Candidate	Votes	%	±%
PDC	Martle N Mukhim	5,809	53.16%	▲15.99
INC	Medistar Warbah	3,366	30.80%	▲10.27
HPU	Jungai Khongjoh	1,738	15.90%	New
Independent	Skoli Kharbamon	15	0.14%	New
Margin of victory		2,443	22.36%	▲21.30
Turnout		10,928	79.05%	▲4.25
Registered electors		14,072		▲34.56
PDC hold		Swing	▲15.99	

=== Assembly Election 1983 ===
1983 Meghalaya Legislative Assembly election: Dienglieng
Party	Candidate	Votes	%	±%
PDC	Medistar Warbah	2,853	37.16%	New
AHL	Martle N Mukhim	2,772	36.11%	▲5.97
INC	Jungai Khongjoh	1,576	20.53%	▼10.92
Independent	Holder Kharumnuid	348	4.53%	New
HSPDP	Loson Lawrensius Nengnong	82	1.07%	▼1.71
Independent	Churchill Mukhim	46	0.60%	New
Margin of victory		81	1.06%	▼0.25
Turnout		7,677	76.77%	▲7.92
Registered electors		10,458		▲9.32
PDC gain from INC		Swing	▲5.72	

=== Assembly Election 1978 ===
1978 Meghalaya Legislative Assembly election: Dienglieng
Party	Candidate	Votes	%	±%
INC	Jungai Khongjoh	1,970	31.44%	New
AHL	Medistar Warbah	1,888	30.14%	▼10.41
Independent	Qrelshon Suting	1,139	18.18%	New
Independent	Martle N Mukhim	1,094	17.46%	New
HSPDP	Tressphin Roy Skhemiew	174	2.78%	New
Margin of victory		82	1.31%	▼2.91
Turnout		6,265	67.88%	▲19.41
Registered electors		9,566		▲55.02
INC gain from AHL		Swing	▼9.10	

=== Assembly Election 1972 ===
1972 Meghalaya Legislative Assembly election: Dienglieng
Party	Candidate	Votes	%	±%
AHL	Beterson Kharkongor	1,153	40.54%	New
Independent	Jungai Khongjoh	1,033	36.32%	New
Independent	Aloysivs Wilford Binan	524	18.42%	New
Independent	Broli Surong	96	3.38%	New
Independent	Festowell Giri	38	1.34%	New
Margin of victory		120	4.22%	
Turnout		2,844	46.38%	
Registered electors		6,171		
AHL win (new seat)				
