= Chokpot Assembly constituency =

Legislative Assembly constituency in Meghalaya State, India

Coordinates: 25.32°N 90.43°E

Chokpot
- Constituency No. 59 for the Meghalaya Legislative Assembly

Constituency details
- Country: India
- Region: Northeast India
- State: Meghalaya
- District: South Garo Hills
- Lok Sabha constituency: Tura
- Established: 1972
- Total electors: 32,180
- Reservation: ST

Member of Legislative Assembly
- 11th Meghalaya Legislative Assembly
- Incumbent Sengchim Sangma
- Party: NPP
- Alliance: NDA
- Elected year: 2023

Chokpot is one of the 60 Legislative Assembly constituencies of Meghalaya state in India. It is part of the South Garo Hills district and is reserved for candidates belonging to the Scheduled Tribes. It falls under the Tura Lok Sabha constituency.

== Members of the Legislative Assembly ==
The list of MLAs are given below:

| Year | MLA | Party |
|---|---|---|
| 1972 | Jackman Marak | All Party Hill Leaders Conference |
| 1978 | Jackman Marak | All Party Hill Leaders Conference |
| 1983 | Clifford Marak | Indian National Congress |
| 1988 | Clifford Marak | Hill People's Union |
| 1993 | Masonsing Sangma | Indian National Congress |
| 1998 | Clifford Marak | Garo National Council |
| 2003 | Masonsing Sangma | Nationalist Congress Party |
| 2008 | Masonsing Sangma | Nationalist Congress Party |
| 2013 | Clifford Marak | Garo National Council |
| 2018 | Lazarus Sangma | Indian National Congress |
| 2023 | Sengchim N. Sangma | National People's Party |

== Election results ==
=== Assembly Election 2023 ===
2023 Meghalaya Legislative Assembly election: Chokpot
| Party | Candidate | Votes | % | ±% |
|---|---|---|---|---|
| NPP | Sengchim Sangma | 9,503 | 33.72% | ▲7.77 |
| GNC | Nikman Ch. Marak | 9,150 | 32.47% | ▲6.81 |
| AITC | Lazarus M Sangma | 5,615 | 19.93% | New |
| INC | Karak R. Sangma | 3,293 | 11.69% | ▼22.64 |
| BJP | Novembirth Ch. Marak | 618 | 2.19% | New |
| NOTA | None of the Above | 331 | 1.17% | ▲0.05 |
| Margin of victory | | 353 | 1.25% | ▼7.12 |
| Turnout | | 28,179 | 87.57% | ▲0.17 |
| Registered electors | | 32,180 | | ▲14.80 |
| NPP gain from INC | | Swing | ▼0.61 | |

=== Assembly Election 2018 ===
2018 Meghalaya Legislative Assembly election: Chokpot
| Party | Candidate | Votes | % | ±% |
|---|---|---|---|---|
| INC | Lazarus Sangma | 8,410 | 34.33% | ▲13.08 |
| NPP | Secondson A. Sangma | 6,359 | 25.96% | ▲0.03 |
| GNC | Kalpana D. Sangma | 6,287 | 25.66% | ▼2.75 |
| Independent | Leoberth R. Sangma | 1,972 | 8.05% | New |
| Independent | Bluebell R. Sangma | 1,064 | 4.34% | New |
| NOTA | None of the Above | 275 | 1.12% | New |
| Margin of victory | | 2,051 | 8.37% | ▲5.89 |
| Turnout | | 24,497 | 87.39% | ▼0.20 |
| Registered electors | | 28,031 | | ▲25.52 |
| INC gain from GNC | | Swing | ▲5.92 | |

=== Assembly Election 2013 ===
2013 Meghalaya Legislative Assembly election: Chokpot
| Party | Candidate | Votes | % | ±% |
|---|---|---|---|---|
| GNC | Clifford Marak | 5,558 | 28.41% | ▲8.44 |
| NPP | Phillipole D. Marak | 5,073 | 25.93% | New |
| INC | Arlene M. N. Sangma | 4,158 | 21.26% | ▲15.75 |
| NCP | Bluebell R. Sangma | 2,389 | 12.21% | ▼14.24 |
| Independent | Jonilson Ch. Marak | 2,384 | 12.19% | New |
| Margin of victory | | 485 | 2.48% | ▼4.01 |
| Turnout | | 19,562 | 87.60% | ▼4.16 |
| Registered electors | | 22,332 | | ▲39.43 |
| GNC gain from NCP | | Swing | ▲1.96 | |

=== Assembly Election 2008 ===
2008 Meghalaya Legislative Assembly election: Chokpot
| Party | Candidate | Votes | % | ±% |
|---|---|---|---|---|
| NCP | Masonsing Sangma | 3,888 | 26.46% | ▼13.77 |
| GNC | Clifford Marak | 2,935 | 19.97% | ▼4.12 |
| UDP | Arlene M. N. Sangma | 2,774 | 18.88% | New |
| Independent | Wenison Marak | 1,782 | 12.13% | New |
| Independent | Perrin Ch Momin | 1,339 | 9.11% | New |
| Independent | Wikkinson Sangma | 1,169 | 7.95% | New |
| INC | Sophie Bensinda Marak | 809 | 5.50% | ▼14.49 |
| Margin of victory | | 953 | 6.48% | ▼9.65 |
| Turnout | | 14,696 | 91.75% | ▲15.47 |
| Registered electors | | 16,017 | | ▼4.05 |
| NCP hold | | Swing | ▼13.77 | |

=== Assembly Election 2003 ===
2003 Meghalaya Legislative Assembly election: Chokpot
| Party | Candidate | Votes | % | ±% |
|---|---|---|---|---|
| NCP | Masonsing Sangma | 5,122 | 40.22% | New |
| GNC | Clifford R. Marak | 3,068 | 24.09% | ▼20.88 |
| INC | Jipson Marak | 2,546 | 19.99% | ▼20.75 |
| Independent | Greaterson Ch. Marak | 1,226 | 9.63% | New |
| Independent | Besterfield Sangma | 772 | 6.06% | New |
| Margin of victory | | 2,054 | 16.13% | ▲11.91 |
| Turnout | | 12,734 | 76.28% | ▲1.40 |
| Registered electors | | 16,693 | | ▲15.48 |
| NCP gain from GNC | | Swing | ▼4.75 | |

=== Assembly Election 1998 ===
1998 Meghalaya Legislative Assembly election: Chokpot
| Party | Candidate | Votes | % | ±% |
|---|---|---|---|---|
| GNC | Clifford R. Marak | 4,868 | 44.97% | New |
| INC | Masonsing Sangma | 4,411 | 40.75% | ▼5.05 |
| Independent | Jipson Marak | 1,546 | 14.28% | New |
| Margin of victory | | 457 | 4.22% | ▼10.21 |
| Turnout | | 10,825 | 76.94% | ▼0.77 |
| Registered electors | | 14,455 | | ▲9.32 |
| GNC gain from INC | | Swing | | |

=== Assembly Election 1993 ===
1993 Meghalaya Legislative Assembly election: Chokpot
| Party | Candidate | Votes | % | ±% |
|---|---|---|---|---|
| INC | Masonsing Sangma | 4,582 | 45.80% | ▲8.53 |
| HPU | Clifford R. Marak | 3,138 | 31.37% | ▼8.31 |
| AHL(AM) | Jackman Marak | 896 | 8.96% | New |
| Independent | Heringtone R. Marak | 695 | 6.95% | New |
| MPPP | Chemberiad Sangma | 693 | 6.93% | New |
| Margin of victory | | 1,444 | 14.43% | ▲12.03 |
| Turnout | | 10,004 | 77.31% | ▲1.10 |
| Registered electors | | 13,223 | | ▲25.53 |
| INC gain from HPU | | Swing | ▲6.13 | |

=== Assembly Election 1988 ===
1988 Meghalaya Legislative Assembly election: Chokpot
| Party | Candidate | Votes | % | ±% |
|---|---|---|---|---|
| HPU | Clifford R. Marak | 3,116 | 39.67% | New |
| INC | Jinjar N. Sangma | 2,927 | 37.27% | ▲12.77 |
| Margin of victory | | 189 | 2.41% | ▼0.39 |
| Turnout | | 7,854 | 77.92% | ▲6.11 |
| Registered electors | | 10,534 | | ▲16.42 |
| HPU gain from Independent | | Swing | | |

=== Assembly Election 1983 ===
1983 Meghalaya Legislative Assembly election: Chokpot
| Party | Candidate | Votes | % | ±% |
|---|---|---|---|---|
| Independent | Clifford Marak | 1,690 | 27.29% | New |
| INC | Masonsing Sangma | 1,517 | 24.50% | ▼15.10 |
| Independent | Greenshon Sangma | 1,279 | 20.65% | New |
| Independent | Jackman Mark | 1,175 | 18.97% | New |
| Independent | Hiringstone R. Marrak | 532 | 8.59% | New |
| Margin of victory | | 173 | 2.79% | ▼4.77 |
| Turnout | | 6,193 | 71.22% | ▲14.08 |
| Registered electors | | 9,048 | | ▲8.20 |
| Independent gain from APHLC | | Swing | ▼19.87 | |

=== Assembly Election 1978 ===
1978 Meghalaya Legislative Assembly election: Chokpot
| Party | Candidate | Votes | % | ±% |
|---|---|---|---|---|
| APHLC | Jackman Marak | 2,144 | 47.16% | ▼23.92 |
| INC | Greendash R. Marka | 1,800 | 39.60% | New |
| Independent | Bani Kanta Barooah | 602 | 13.24% | New |
| Margin of victory | | 344 | 7.57% | ▼34.60 |
| Turnout | | 4,546 | 57.20% | ▲17.09 |
| Registered electors | | 8,362 | | ▲39.95 |
| APHLC hold | | Swing | ▼23.92 | |

=== Assembly Election 1972 ===
1972 Meghalaya Legislative Assembly election: Chokpot
| Party | Candidate | Votes | % | ±% |
|---|---|---|---|---|
| APHLC | Jackman Marak | 1,583 | 71.08% | New |
| Independent | Greendash R, Marak | 644 | 28.92% | New |
| Margin of victory | | 939 | 42.16% | |
| Turnout | | 2,227 | 41.36% | |
| Registered electors | | 5,975 | | |
| APHLC win (new seat) | | | | |

== See also ==
- List of constituencies of the Meghalaya Legislative Assembly
- South Garo Hills district
- Tura (Lok Sabha constituency)
