= North Shillong Assembly constituency =

Legislative Assembly constituency in Meghalaya State, India

Coordinates: 25.606°N 91.888°E

North Shillong
- Constituency No. 17 for the Meghalaya Legislative Assembly

Constituency details
- Country: India
- Region: Northeast India
- State: Meghalaya
- District: East Khasi Hills
- Lok Sabha constituency: Shillong
- Established: 2008
- Total electors: 28,336
- Reservation: ST

Member of Legislative Assembly
- 11th Meghalaya Legislative Assembly
- Incumbent Adelbert Nongrum
- Party: Voice of the People Party (VPP)
- Elected year: 2023

North Shillong is one of the 60 Legislative Assembly constituencies of Meghalaya state in India. It is part of East Khasi Hills district and is reserved for candidates belonging to the Scheduled Tribes. It falls under Shillong Lok Sabha constituency. The seat had been vacant following the resignation of Adelbert Nongrum, formerly of the Khun Hynniewtrep National Awakening Movement (KHNAM) on 12 January 2023. Nongrum won the seat again following the 2023 Meghalaya Legislative Assembly election.

== Members of the Legislative Assembly ==
The list of MLAs are given below –

Year	Member	Party
2013	Roshan Warjri	Indian National Congress
2018	Adelbert Nongrum	Khun Hynniewtrep National Awakening Movement
2023	Adelbert Nongrum	Voice of the People Party

== Election results ==
=== Assembly Election 2023 ===
2023 Meghalaya Legislative Assembly election: North Shillong
Party	Candidate	Votes	%	±%
VPP	Adelbert Nongrum	5,583	29.75%	New
BJP	Mariahom Kharkrang	4,550	24.25%	▼2.49
UDP	Dr. Aman Warr	3,791	20.20%	▲16.14
NPP	Ransom Sutnga	1,975	10.52%	▲8.24
INC	J. Antonius Lyngdoh	1,555	8.29%	▼18.24
AITC	Elgiva Gwyneth Rynjah	816	4.35%	New
Independent	L. Michael Kharsyntiew	385	2.05%	New
NOTA	None of the Above	191	1.02%	▲0.02
Margin of victory		1,033	5.50%	▲3.40
Turnout		18,766	66.23%	▼6.06
Registered electors		28,336		▲6.03
VPP gain from KHNAM		Swing	▲0.91	

=== Assembly Election 2018 ===
2018 Meghalaya Legislative Assembly election: North Shillong
Party	Candidate	Votes	%	±%
KHNAM	Adelbert Nongrum	5,572	28.84%	▼6.13
BJP	J. Antonius Lyngdoh	5,166	26.74%	New
INC	W. Humphrey D. Syngkon	5,124	26.52%	▼20.62
HSPDP	Alester Neville Diengdoh	968	5.01%	New
UDP	Joebrenson Marwein	785	4.06%	▼10.38
NPP	Erwin K. Syiem Sutnga	441	2.28%	▼1.16
NEIDP	Tony Fass Marbaniang	327	1.69%	New
NOTA	None of the Above	193	1.00%	New
Margin of victory		406	2.10%	▼10.07
Turnout		19,319	72.29%	▼1.10
Registered electors		26,725		▲9.49
KHNAM gain from INC		Swing	▼18.30	

=== Assembly Election 2013 ===
2013 Meghalaya Legislative Assembly election: North Shillong
Party	Candidate	Votes	%	±%
INC	Roshan Warjri	8,445	47.14%	New
KHNAM	Adelbert Nongrum	6,265	34.97%	New
UDP	Ibarilin Kharsati	2,587	14.44%	New
NPP	Philomath Passah	616	3.44%	New
Margin of victory		2,180	12.17%	
Turnout		17,913	73.39%	
Registered electors		24,408		
INC win (new seat)				

== See also ==
- List of constituencies of the Meghalaya Legislative Assembly
- Shillong (Lok Sabha constituency)
- East Khasi Hills district
