= Lazarus Sangma =

Indian politicians

Member of Meghalaya Legislative Assembly
- In office 2018–2023
- Preceded by: Clifford Marak
- Succeeded by: Sengchim Sangma
- Constituency: Chokpot

Personal details
- Party: AITC
- Occupation: Politician

Lazarus Sangma was a member of Meghalaya Legislative Assembly (MLA) from the Chokpot constituency from 2018 to 2023.

Sangma won the 2018 Meghalaya Legislative elections as a candidate from the INC party. Later, he joined the AITC, quitting the Indian National Congress.
