= Kherapara Assembly constituency =

Former assembly constituency in Meghalaya, India

Coordinates: 25.34°N 90.21°E

Kherapara
- Former constituency for the Meghalaya Legislative Assembly

Constituency details
- Country: India
- Region: Northeast India
- State: Meghalaya
- District: West Garo Hills
- Lok Sabha constituency: Tura
- Established: 1972
- Abolished: 2008
- Total electors: 17,684 (2008)
- Reservation: ST

Kherapara is a former assembly constituencies of Meghalaya, a north east state of India. It was also part of Tura (Lok Sabha constituency). It was abolished by the Delimitation of Parliamentary and Assembly Constituencies Order, 2008.

== Members of the Legislative Assembly ==
Year	Member	Party
1972	Plansing Marak	All Party Hill Leaders Conference
1978	Alfrien Marak	
1983	Roster M. Sangma	Indian National Congress
1988	Chamberu Marak	Independent
1993	Brening Sangma	Indian National Congress
1998	Brening Sangma	Indian National Congress
2003	Brening Sangma	Nationalist Congress Party
2008	Phillipole Marak	Nationalist Congress Party

== Election results ==
=== Assembly Election 2008 ===
2008 Meghalaya Legislative Assembly election: Kherapara
Party	Candidate	Votes	%	±%
NCP	Phillipole Marak	9,587	58.86%	▲17.56
INC	Brening A. Sangma	5,371	32.97%	▲12.29
Independent	Enison M. Marak	717	4.40%	New
UDP	Lindin C. Momin	365	2.24%	New
Independent	Michael N. Sangma	249	1.53%	New
Margin of victory		4,216	25.88%	▲5.27
Turnout		16,289	92.11%	▲16.40
Registered electors		17,684		▲2.05
NCP hold		Swing	▲17.56	

=== Assembly Election 2003 ===
2003 Meghalaya Legislative Assembly election: Kherapara
Party	Candidate	Votes	%	±%
NCP	Brening A. Sangma	5,418	41.30%	New
INC	Kenethson Sangma	2,714	20.69%	▼33.04
Independent	Enison Marak	2,713	20.68%	New
GNC	Stephen Momin	1,478	11.27%	▼11.33
Independent	Sahason R. Marak	796	6.07%	New
Margin of victory		2,704	20.61%	▼10.52
Turnout		13,119	75.71%	▲2.57
Registered electors		17,328		▲6.59
NCP gain from INC		Swing	▼12.43	

=== Assembly Election 1998 ===
1998 Meghalaya Legislative Assembly election: Kherapara
Party	Candidate	Votes	%	±%
INC	Brening Sangma	6,389	53.73%	▲23.94
GNC	Jennar S. Marak	2,687	22.60%	New
Independent	Enison M. Marak	1,528	12.85%	New
Independent	Chamberlin Marak	1,008	8.48%	New
UDP	Saviour D. Shira	279	2.35%	New
Margin of victory		3,702	31.13%	▲17.16
Turnout		11,891	75.43%	▼9.42
Registered electors		16,257		▲12.75
INC hold		Swing	▲23.94	

=== Assembly Election 1993 ===
1993 Meghalaya Legislative Assembly election: Kherapara
Party	Candidate	Votes	%	±%
INC	Brening Sangma	3,546	29.79%	▼0.26
HPU	Chamberlin R. Marak	1,883	15.82%	▼0.17
AHL(AM)	Oliver Momin	1,805	15.16%	New
Independent	Alfiren Marak	1,007	8.46%	New
Independent	Jhon Kendedy Sangma	954	8.01%	New
Independent	Jennar S. Marak	640	5.38%	New
Independent	Roster M. Sangma	631	5.30%	New
Margin of victory		1,663	13.97%	▲13.97
Turnout		11,904	84.51%	▲11.94
Registered electors		14,418		▲18.09
INC gain from Independent		Swing	▼0.26	

=== Assembly Election 1988 ===
1988 Meghalaya Legislative Assembly election: Kherapara
Party	Candidate	Votes	%	±%
Independent	Chamberun Marak	2,591	30.05%	New
INC	Roster M. Sangma	2,591	30.04%	▼0.08
AHL(AM)	Alfrien R. Marak	2,062	23.91%	New
HPU	Milton S. Sangma	1,379	15.99%	New
Margin of victory		1	0.01%	▼12.95
Turnout		8,623	73.28%	▲5.93
Registered electors		12,209		▲25.80
Independent gain from INC		Swing	▼0.07	

=== Assembly Election 1983 ===
1983 Meghalaya Legislative Assembly election: Kherapara
Party	Candidate	Votes	%	±%
INC	Roster M. Sangma	1,891	30.12%	▲9.90
Independent	Oliver G. Momin	1,077	17.15%	New
APHLC	Alfrien Marak	1,007	16.04%	▼24.24
Independent	Hendon T. Sangma	971	15.46%	New
Independent	Chamber Marak	688	10.96%	New
Independent	Archibold A. Sangma	645	10.27%	New
Margin of victory		814	12.96%	▲12.18
Turnout		6,279	68.28%	▲17.64
Registered electors		9,705		▲5.06
INC gain from APHLC		Swing	▼10.16	

=== Assembly Election 1978 ===
1978 Meghalaya Legislative Assembly election: Kherapara
Party	Candidate	Votes	%	±%
APHLC	Alfrien Marak	1,751	40.28%	▼41.37
Independent	Hendon T.Sangma	1,717	39.50%	New
INC	Plansing Marak	879	20.22%	New
Margin of victory		34	0.78%	▼62.51
Turnout		4,347	50.57%	▲21.05
Registered electors		9,238		▲56.90
APHLC hold		Swing		

=== Assembly Election 1972 ===
1972 Meghalaya Legislative Assembly election: Kherapara
Party	Candidate	Votes	%	±%
APHLC	Plansing Marak	1,250	81.65%	New
Independent	Janathon Sangma	281	18.35%	New
Margin of victory		969	63.29%	
Turnout		1,531	28.28%	
Registered electors		5,888		
APHLC win (new seat)				

== See also ==
- West Garo Hills district
- Tura (Lok Sabha constituency)
