= Mawkhar Assembly constituency =

Constituency of the Meghalaya legislative assembly in India

Mawkhar
- Former constituency for the Meghalaya Legislative Assembly

Constituency details
- Country: India
- Region: Northeast India
- State: Meghalaya
- Established: 1972
- Abolished: 2013
- Total electors: 7,799

Mawkhar Assembly constituency was an assembly constituency in the India state of Meghalaya.

== Members of the Legislative Assembly ==
Election	Member	Party
1972	Alexander Warjri	All Party Hill Leaders Conference
1978	Darwin Diengdoh Pugh	All Party Hill Leaders Conference
1983	Korbar Singh	All Party Hill Leaders Conference
1988	Korbar Singh	Hill People's Union
1993	Roshan Warjri	Hill People's Union
1998	Roshan Warjri	United Democratic Party
2003	Dr. Friday Lyngdoh	Indian National Congress
2008	Dr. Friday Lyngdoh	Indian National Congress

== Election results ==
=== Assembly Election 2008 ===
2008 Meghalaya Legislative Assembly election: Mawkhar
Party	Candidate	Votes	%	±%
INC	Dr. Friday Lyngdoh	2,413	38.73%	▼20.32
UDP	Ganold Stone Massar	1,836	29.47%	▲17.35
KHNAM	Glenbert Lawrence Khongwir	1,138	18.26%	▼0.77
BJP	W. Laslarton Lyngdoh	468	7.51%	▲1.40
NCP	Pradeep G. Jyrwa	376	6.03%	▲2.33
Margin of victory		577	9.26%	▼30.75
Turnout		6,231	79.89%	▲28.19
Registered electors		7,799		▼33.27
INC hold		Swing	▼20.32	

=== Assembly Election 2003 ===
2003 Meghalaya Legislative Assembly election: Mawkhar
Party	Candidate	Votes	%	±%
INC	Dr. Friday Lyngdoh	3,568	59.04%	▲10.05
KHNAM	James Marvin Pariat	1,150	19.03%	New
UDP	Hardinge L. Massar	732	12.11%	▼38.16
BJP	Moon Pyrbot	369	6.11%	New
NCP	Pradeep G. Jyrwa	224	3.71%	New
Margin of victory		2,418	40.01%	▲38.74
Turnout		6,043	51.79%	▼8.03
Registered electors		11,688		▲8.74
INC gain from UDP		Swing	▲8.77	

=== Assembly Election 1998 ===
1998 Meghalaya Legislative Assembly election: Mawkhar
Party	Candidate	Votes	%	±%
UDP	Roshan Warjri	3,228	50.27%	New
INC	Dr. Friday Lyngdoh	3,146	49.00%	▲8.18
RJD	Orphues D. Nongrum	47	0.73%	New
Margin of victory		82	1.28%	▼6.96
Turnout		6,421	61.62%	▼8.33
Registered electors		10,749		▲5.36
UDP gain from HPU		Swing		

=== Assembly Election 1993 ===
1993 Meghalaya Legislative Assembly election: Mawkhar
Party	Candidate	Votes	%	±%
HPU	Roshan Warjri	3,406	49.05%	▼5.11
INC	Dr. Friday Lyngdoh	2,834	40.81%	▼5.03
BJP	H. Robin Kurbah	704	10.14%	New
Margin of victory		572	8.24%	▼0.09
Turnout		6,944	69.70%	▲3.09
Registered electors		10,202		▲7.56
HPU hold		Swing		

=== Assembly Election 1988 ===
1988 Meghalaya Legislative Assembly election: Mawkhar
Party	Candidate	Votes	%	±%
HPU	Korbar Singh	3,338	54.16%	New
INC	W. Humphrey Dolly Syngkon	2,825	45.84%	▲18.44
Margin of victory		513	8.32%	▲3.27
Turnout		6,163	67.06%	▲1.96
Registered electors		9,485		▲9.48
HPU gain from AHL		Swing		

=== Assembly Election 1983 ===
1983 Meghalaya Legislative Assembly election: Mawkhar
Party	Candidate	Votes	%	±%
AHL	Korbar Singh	1,772	32.45%	▲1.81
INC	W. Humphrey Dolly Syngkon	1,496	27.40%	▲7.03
Independent	E. Shersingh Jyrwa	1,146	20.99%	New
HSPDP	Hardinge L. Massar	352	6.45%	▼16.17
Independent	Neville Rufus Laitphlang	332	6.08%	New
Independent	Pollington Pyrtuh	253	4.63%	New
CPI	Dalington Dympep	97	1.78%	New
Margin of victory		276	5.05%	▼2.97
Turnout		5,460	66.12%	▼3.75
Registered electors		8,664		▲2.46
AHL hold		Swing	▲1.81	

=== Assembly Election 1978 ===
1978 Meghalaya Legislative Assembly election: Mawkhar
Party	Candidate	Votes	%	±%
AHL	Darwin Diengdoh Pugh	1,730	30.64%	▼2.47
HSPDP	E. Shersingh Jyrwa	1,277	22.62%	New
INC	Ajra Singh Khongphai	1,150	20.37%	New
Independent	Ram Niwas Chaudhary	558	9.88%	New
Independent	Londronath Marbaniang	419	7.42%	New
Independent	Ambrose B. M. Roy	394	6.98%	New
INC(I)	Humley Ganrley Roy Pariat	118	2.09%	New
Margin of victory		453	8.02%	▲3.64
Turnout		5,646	68.79%	▲8.60
Registered electors		8,456		▲10.48
AHL hold		Swing	▼2.47	

=== Assembly Election 1972 ===
1972 Meghalaya Legislative Assembly election: Mawkhar
Party	Candidate	Votes	%	±%
AHL	Alexander Warjri	1,474	33.11%	New
Independent	Ajra Khongphai	1,279	28.73%	New
Independent	Gilbert Shullai	1,212	27.22%	New
Independent	Stanlin Rajee	290	6.51%	New
Independent	Silverine Swer	197	4.42%	New
Margin of victory		195	4.38%	
Turnout		4,452	59.93%	
Registered electors		7,654		
AHL win (new seat)				
