= Meghalaya Progressive Alliance =

Regional Political alliance in India

The Meghalaya Progressive Alliance (MPA) was the ruling coalition of political parties that formed the Government in the state of Meghalaya, India from 2008 to 2009. It was led by the Nationalist Congress Party (NCP) and the United Democratic Party (UDP) who are the second and third largest parties in the 8th Meghalaya Legislative Assembly. Chief Minister Dr. Donkupar Roy and the other ministers in the Government belong to the MPA.

== History ==
The MPA was formed soon after the 2008 Meghalaya Legislative Assembly election when it emerged that the Indian National Congress (INC) did not have sufficient Members of the Legislative Assembly (MLAs) to form the Government. All the non-INC parties in the state decided to join hands and formed the MPA in a bid to keep the INC out of power in Meghalaya.

After the elections, the Governor S. S. Sidhu invited the INC-led Meghalaya United Alliance (MUA) under the leadership of D. D. Lapang to form the Government by virtue of being the largest party in the Assembly. The MPA claimed that this move by the Governor was unconstitutional since the MUA did not have sufficient majority in the Assembly. The MUA was given 10 days to prove its majority in the Assembly. As the confidence vote approached, D. D. Lapang resigned and the MPA was given the chance to form the Government.

The MPA Government headed by Dr. Donkupar Roy was sworn in by Governor Sidhu on 19 March 2008 with the support of 31 members in the 60 member Assembly.

The MPA have pledged to provide top priority to ensuring transparency in governance and have prepared a common minimum program that reflects promises made by each of the constituent parties in their respective poll manifestoes.

== Initial Support ==
At the time of formation, the MPA included the following members:

- Nationalist Congress Party(NCP) (14 MLAs)
- United Democratic Party (UDP) (11 MLAs)
- Hill State People's Democratic Party (HPDP) (2 MLAs)
- Khun Hynniewtrep National Awakening Movement (KHNAM) (1 MLA)
- Bharatiya Janata Party (BJP) (1 MLA)
- independents (2 MLAs)

Despite being the largest party, the NCP gave up the Chief Minister post to UDP in order to achieve stability in the Government. There are also some reports of a power-sharing agreement between the UDP and NCP to share the Chief Minister position for two and a half years each.

== Changes in constituents ==
By June, the MPA was able to secure further support from 2 additional independent MLAs. This took the ruling party's count to 33 in the 60 member Assembly.

== Collapse ==
In March 2009, Meghalaya was put under President's Rule. By May 2009, the United Democratic Party and the Hill State People's Democratic Party had left the Progressive Alliance, and the United Alliance returned to power with D.D. Lapang as chief minister.

== See also ==
- 2008 Meghalaya Legislative Assembly election
