= Adelbert Nongrum =

Indian politician

MLA of the Meghalaya Legislative Assembly for North Shillong
- Incumbent
- Assumed office 2023
- Preceded by: Roshan Warjri
- Constituency: North Shillong
- In office 2018–2023

Personal details
- Born: 25 September 1976 (age 49)
- Party: Voice of the People Party (VPP)
- Occupation: Politician

Adelbert Nongrum is an Indian politician who represents the North Shillong constituency as a member of the Voice Of The People Party. He had previously served as the president of the Khun Hynniewtrep National Awakening Movement (KHNAM), a political party in Meghalaya, north-eastern India. Representing North Shillong constituency, he was the party's only representative in the Meghalaya Legislative Assembly following the 2018 election.

In July 2022, Nongrum indicated hia intention to join the Voice of the People Party , and in October stated that he planned to contest the 2023 Meghalaya Legislative Assembly election for the party. On 12 January 2023, Nongrum resigned from the Assembly and repeated his intention to contest the 2023 election as a VPP candidate. After joining the VPP, Nongrum was re-elected as a member of the Meghalaya Legislative Assembly.
