= Sengchim Sangma =

Indian politician

Sengchim N. Sangma (born 1985) is an Indian politician from Meghalaya. He is a member of the Meghalaya Legislative Assembly from the Chokpot Assembly constituency, which is reserved for Scheduled Tribe community, in South Garo Hills district. He won the 2023 Meghalaya Legislative Assembly election representing the National People's Party.

== Early life and education ==
Sangma is from Ruga Adinggre village, Dimapara post, Gasuapara PS, South Garo Hills district, Meghalaya. He is the son of Mediforth D Marak. He completed his Bachelor of Arts degree in 2013 at a college affiliated with North Eastern Hill University, Shillong. His wife is a teacher.

== Career ==
Sangma won the Chokpot Assembly constituency representing the National People's Party in the 2023 Meghalaya Legislative Assembly election. He polled 9,503 votes and defeated his nearest rival, Nikman Ch. Marak of Garo National Council, by a margin of 353 votes.
