= Phillipole Marak =

Indian politician

Phillipole Marak is an Indian politician and member of the National People's Party. Marak was a member of the Meghalaya Legislative Assembly from the Kherapara constituency in West Garo Hills district.
