= Masonsing Sangma =

Indian politician

Masonsing Sangma was an Indian politician and member of the Nationalist Congress Party. Sangma was a member of the Meghalaya Legislative Assembly from the Chokpot constituency in South Garo Hills district.
