= Bindo Lanong =

Indian politician

Deputy Chief Minister of Meghalaya
- In office 20 April 2010 – 5 March 2013
- Preceded by: Mukul Sangma
- Succeeded by: Prestone Tynsong
- Constituency: Malki-Nongthymmai

Speaker of Meghalaya Legislative Assembly
- In office March 2008 – May 2009
- Preceded by: M. M. Danggo
- Succeeded by: Charles Pyngrope
- Constituency: Malki-Nongthymmai

Member of Meghalaya Legislative Assembly
- In office 2008–2013
- Constituency: Malki-Nongthymmai

Personal details
- Born: Bindo Lanong; 1949/1950
- Party: United Democratic Party
- Education: LLB North-Eastern Hill University
- Occupation: Advocate

Bindo Lanong (born 1949/1950) is an Indian politician. He has been elected twice to the Meghalaya Legislative Assembly from Malki-Nongthymmai; in 1983 and in 2008 as a member of the United Democratic Party. He was sworn as Minister of State for Labour, Environment, Relief, and Rehabilitation, Earthquake Rehabilitation in Mukul Sangma cabinet in June 2019.

He was elected as Speaker of Meghalaya Legislative Assembly from March 2008 to May 2009 and served as Deputy Chief Minister of Meghalaya from April 2010 to March 2013
