= Meghalaya Democratic Party =

- Abbreviation: MDP
- Founded: 2002
- Headquarters: Shillong
- Seats in Meghalaya Legislative Assembly: 0 / 60

The Meghalaya Democratic Party (MDP) is a political party in the north-east Indian state of Meghalaya formed in 2002. The party formed as a split from the United Democratic Party.

Following the 2003 Meghalaya Legislative Assembly election, the party secured four seats and joined the governing Meghalaya Democratic Alliance coalition under Chief Minister D. D. Lapang. The party secured three ministerial seats in the first cabinet, however, following implementation of 91st Constitutional amendment in 2004, the cabinet was reduced from 39 to 12, with the MDP losing all seats in the cabinet.

The party lost its four seats in the 2008 elections, was unable to win any seats in the 2013 election and did not field any candidates in the 2018 election.

Legislative Assembly election results
	Seats			Votes		
	Contested	Won	+/-	Total	%	+/-
2003	18	4		47,852	5.31	
2008	18	0	▼4	30,691	2.78	▼2.53
2013	2	0	Steady	6,098	0.46	▼2.32
