= Khun Hynniewtrep National Awakening Movement =

- Abbreviation: KHNAM
- Colours: Pink

The Khun Hynniewtrep National Awakening Movement is a political party formed in Meghalaya, India. Its former president and leader was Paul Lyngdoh, a former KSU leader.

Lyngdoh subsequently split a regional group from the party, calling it Khun Hynniewtrep National Awakening Movement (Paul Lyngdoh). In 2011, the party merged with the United Democratic Party (Meghalaya), and in 2014, Lyngdoh became the UDP's president.

== Electoral history ==
Election	Seats won	Seats +/-	Source
2003	2 / 60	-	
2008	1 / 60	▼1	
2013	0 / 60	▼1	
2018	1 / 60	▲1	

== List of MLAs ==
Election	Constituencies	Legislators	Margin
2003	Jaiaw	Paul Lyngdoh	3,590
2003	Nongkrem	Lambor Malngiang	82
2008	Jaiaw	Paul Lyngdoh	6,695
2018	North Shillong	Adelbert Nongrum	406

=== Runner-up Candidates ===
Election	Constituencies	Runner-up Candidates	Lost by
2003	Shella	Pyndapborthiaw Saibon	222
2003	Nongshken	Ganold Stone Massar	1,053
2003	Mawkhar	James Marvin Pariat	2,418
2003	Dienglieng	Teilang S Blah	2,463
2008	Langkyrdem	Dominic Roblin Nongkynrih	803
2008	Mawkhar	James Marvin Pariat	717
2013	North Shillong	Adelbert Nongrum	2,180
