= Donkupar Roy =

Indian politician (1954–2019)

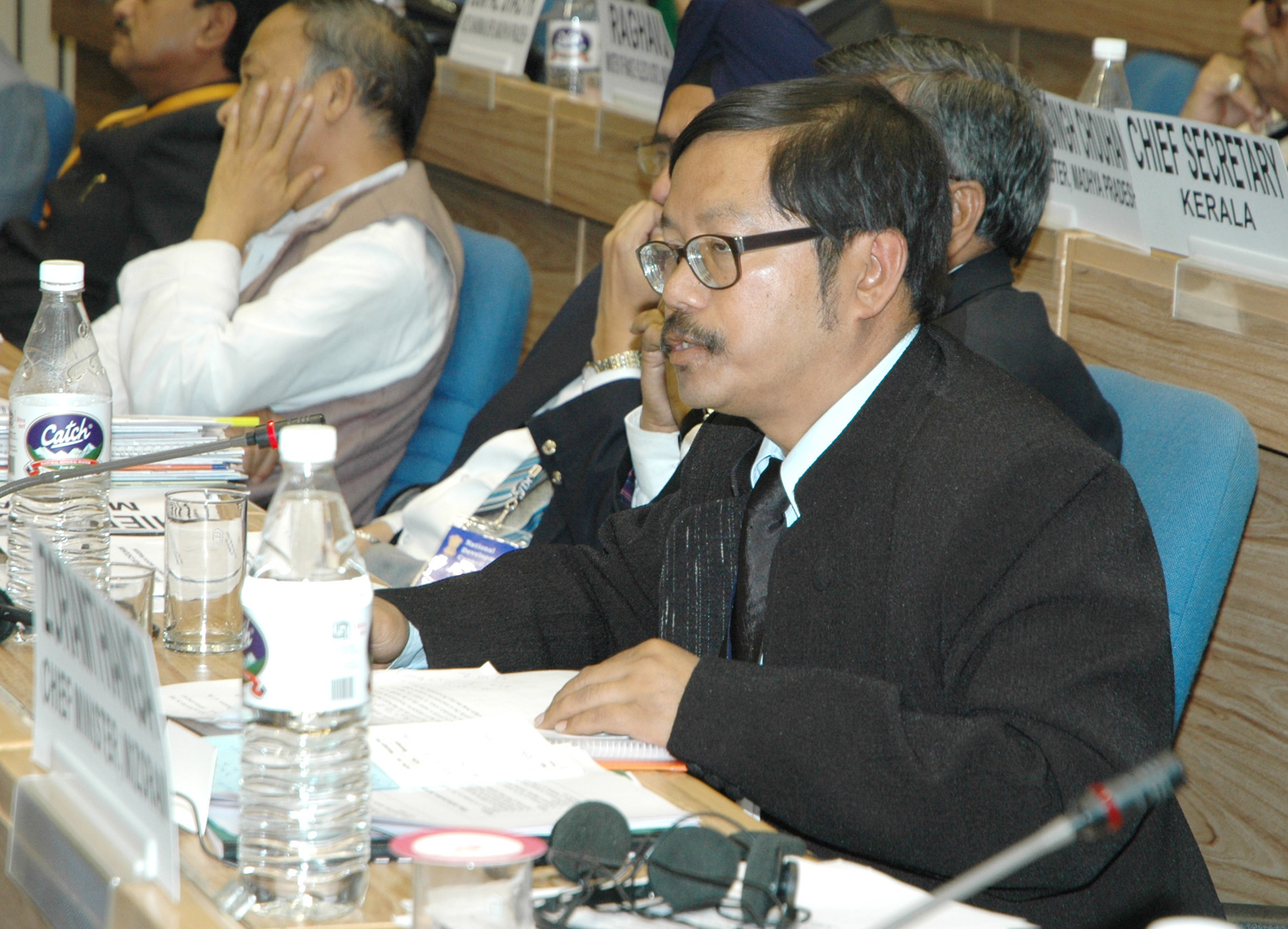

13th Speaker of the Meghalaya Legislative Assembly
- In office 6 March 2018 – 28 July 2019
- Preceded by: Abu Taher Mondal
- Succeeded by: Metbah Lyngdoh

10th Chief Minister of Meghalaya
- In office 19 March 2008 – 19 March 2009
- Governor: Shivinder Singh Sidhu; Ranjit Shekhar Mooshahary
- Preceded by: D.D. Lapang
- Succeeded by: President's Rule

Personal details
- Born: 10 November 1954
- Died: 28 July 2019 (aged 64) Gurugram, Haryana, India
- Party: United Democratic Party
- Education: North-Eastern Hill University

Donkupar Roy (10 November 1954 – 28 July 2019) was an Indian politician, who served as Chief Minister of Meghalaya. He was the head of the United Democratic Party, a political party recognised in Meghalaya.

== Political career ==
After a fractured mandate in Meghalaya's 2008 Assembly Elections, an alliance between his UDP and a handful of other parties stated a claim to form the government under the banner of the Meghalaya Progressive Alliance, with Roy as Chief Minister. After D. D. Lapang resigned as Chief Minister because he did not hold a majority in the state legislature, Roy was sworn in as Chief Minister on 19 March 2008.

On 19 March 2009, exactly one year into his term, the government was dismissed and the state was put under President's Rule. In May 2009, the United Democratic Party left the Progressive Alliance, and D.D. Lapang of the Congress Party returned to power as chief minister. Under Conrad Sangma government, he was the speaker of the assembly.

== Death ==
He died due to multiple organ failure at Medanta Hospital in Gurugram at around 2:50 PM. He was 64.
