= D. D. Lapang =

Indian politician (1934–2025)

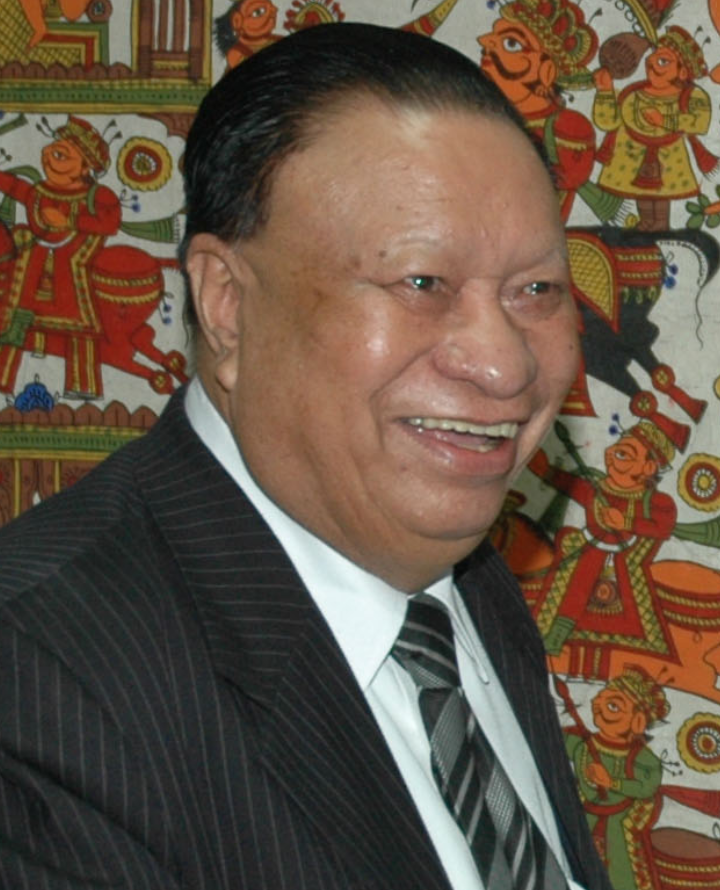

5th Chief Minister of Meghalaya
- In office 13 May 2009 – 19 April 2010
- Governor: Ranjit Shekhar Mooshahary
- Preceded by: Donkupar Roy
- Succeeded by: Mukul Sangma
- In office 10 March 2007 – 19 March 2008
- Governor: M. M. Jacob; Banwari Lal Joshi; Shivinder Singh Sidhu
- Preceded by: J. D. Rymbai
- Succeeded by: Donkupar Roy
- In office 4 March 2003 – 15 June 2006
- Governor: M. M. Jacob
- Preceded by: Flinder Anderson Khonglam
- Succeeded by: J. D. Rymbai
- In office 5 February 1992 – 19 February 1993
- Governor: Madhukar Dighe
- Preceded by: B. B. Lyngdoh
- Succeeded by: S. C. Marak

Deputy Chief Minister of Meghalaya
- In office 2001–2003
- In office 27 February 1998 – 10 March 1998

Personal details
- Born: 10 April 1934
- Died: 12 September 2025 (aged 91) Shillong, Meghalaya, India
- Party: National People's Party (since 2018)
- Other political affiliations: Indian National Congress (until 2018)
- Spouse: Amethyst Lynda Jomes Blah (m.1958)

Donwa Dethwelson Lapang (10 April 1934 – 12 September 2025) was an Indian politician from Meghalaya who served as Chief Minister of Meghalaya.

== Life and career ==
Lapang was born on 10 April 1934. He started his life as a road labourer and worked his way up to become Sub-Inspector of schools. His father's name was Donwa War. In 1958, he married Amethyst Lynda Jomes Blah.

In 1972, he became MLA (Member of Legislative Assembly) from Nongpoh as an independent candidate. In 1992, he became the Chief Minister of Meghalaya, serving until February 1993. On 4 March 2003, he was again sworn in as Chief Minister. He resigned from the position on 15 June 2006 due to dissent in the coalition government.

He took office as Chief Minister again in March 2007. His party, the Indian National Congress, won a plurality of seats in the March 2008 state legislative election, and Lapang was sworn in as Chief Minister on 10 March 2008, but with the support of only 28 members of the 60 seat legislature, he resigned on 19 March.

Lapang became chief minister for a fourth time on 13 May 2009, after the state was under President's Rule for two months, and resigned on 19 April 2010.

Lapang died on 12 September 2025 in Shillong, at the age of 91.
