= United Democratic Party (Meghalaya) =

Political party in India

- Abbreviation: UDP
- Leader: Metbah Lyngdoh
- President: Metbah Lyngdoh
- Secretary: H. A. D. Sawian
- Parliamentary Chairperson: Metbah Lyngdoh
- Founded: 1997
- Headquarters: Mawlai Nonglum, Shillong-793008 Meghalaya.
- Ideology: Regionalism; Populism
- ECI status: State Party
- Alliance: MDA (2018- Present)
- Seats in Meghalaya Legislative Assembly: 1 / 60

Election symbol
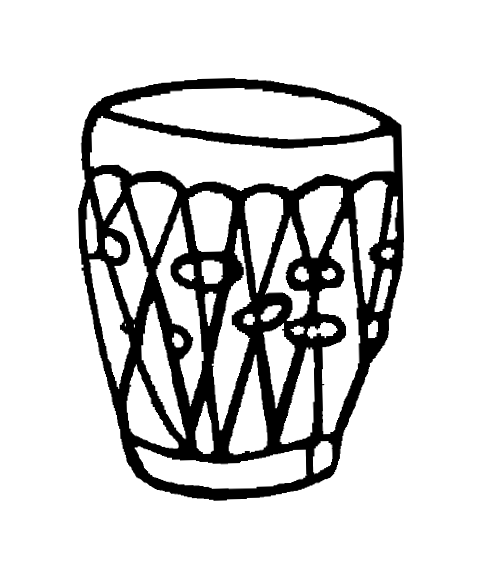
- Drum

Party flag
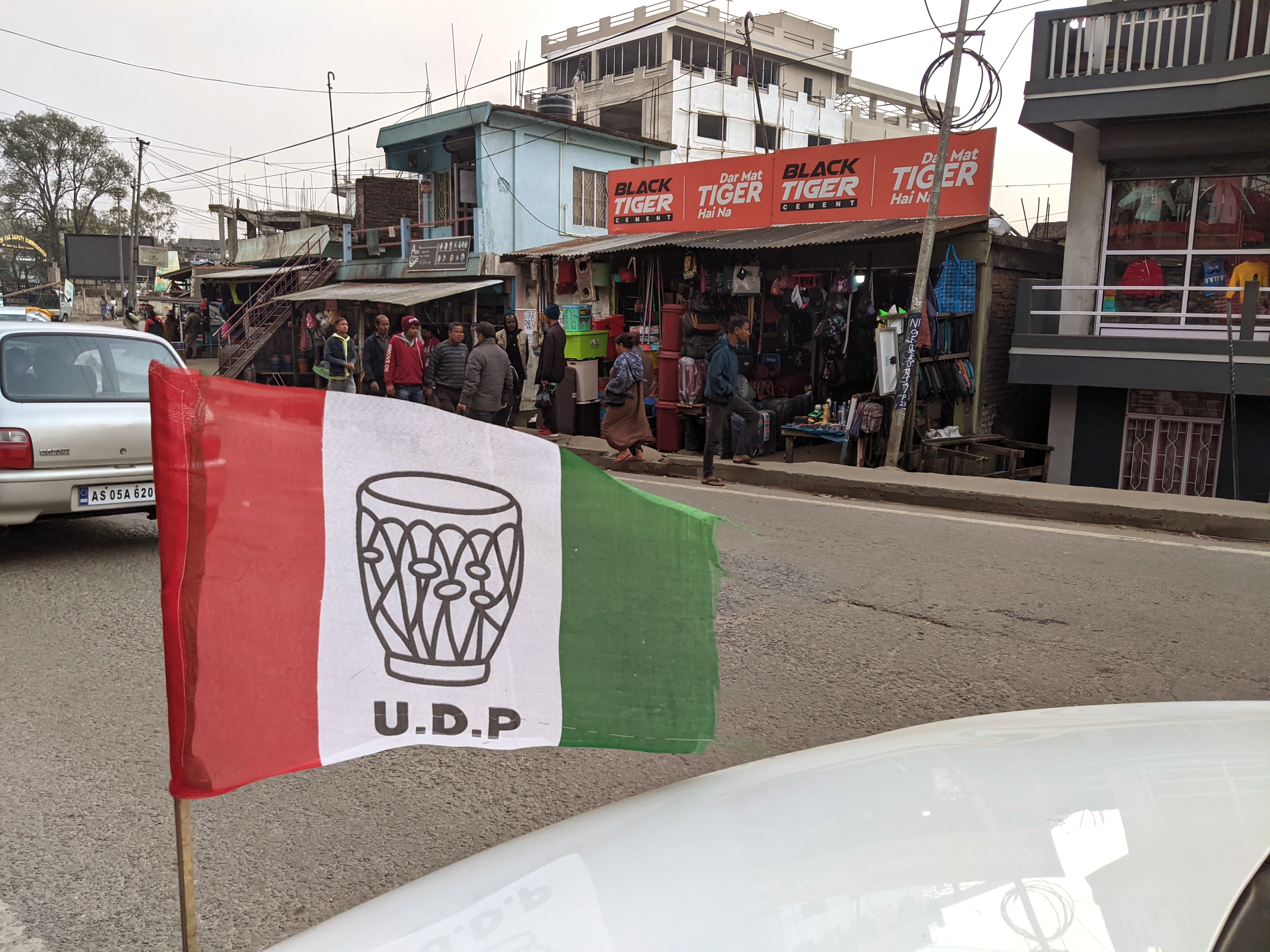

The United Democratic Party (UDP) is a political party recognised in Meghalaya state, India. It is now led by Metbah Lyngdoh. It was started by E. K. Mawlong.

The flag of the party is of three vertical colours with scarlet red colour at the extreme left nearest to the flag post, parrot green colour at the extreme right and white colour at the middle signifying respectively courage, valour and sacrifice (Scarlet Red), sincerity, honesty, integrity (White) and hope, hard work, survival (Green).

== History ==
In 1998, B. B. Lyngdoh was sworn in as Chief Minister of Meghalaya with the support of his erstwhile rival, the Indian National Congress. UDP won 20 MLAs in the 60-member house and with 26 MLAs Indian National Congress was senior partner in the Alliance. There was a power-sharing agreement between the UDP and Indian National Congress to share the Chief position for two and a half years each. D. D. Lapang was named Deputy Chief Minister of Meghalaya.

In 2000, E. K. Mawlong succeeded B. B. Lyngdoh as the Chief Minister of Meghalaya. Mawlong in his 18-month tenure was embroiled in a scandal stemming from the construction of Meghalaya House in Kolkata. Bharatiya Janata Party and Nationalist Congress Party withdrew their support for Mawlong and he was forced to step down from office in December 2001.

=== Meghalaya Progressive Alliance ===
In 2008, UDP formed Meghalaya Progressive Alliance along with Nationalist Congress Party, Hill State People's Democratic Party, Khun Hynniewtrep National Awakening Movement, Bharatiya Janata Party and along with two Independents.

Despite being the largest party, the Nationalist Congress Party gave up the Chief Minister post to UDP in order to achieve stability in the Government. There are also some reports of a power-sharing agreement between the UDP and NCP to share the Chief Minister position for two and a half years each.

Dr. Donkupar Roy was named the Chief Minister of Meghalaya with the support of 31 members in the 60 member Assembly.

In May 2009, the United Democratic Party and the Hill State People's Democratic Party had left the Progressive Alliance and government collapsed.

=== North-East Democratic Alliance ===
In May 2016, after the Bharatiya Janata Party led National Democratic Alliance formed its first government in Assam, and formed a new alliance called the North-East Democratic Alliance (NEDA) non-Congress parties from the northeast with Himanta Biswa Sarma as its convener. The Chief Ministers of the north eastern states of all states too belong to this alliance.

In March 2018, The NPP came second behind Indian National Congress by winning 19 seats in the 2018 Meghalaya legislative assembly election. Conrad Sangma staked claim to form government with a letter of support from the 34 MLAs, that included 19 from NPP, six from United Democratic Party, 4 from People's Democratic Front, two each from Hill State People's Democratic Party and Bharatiya Janata Party, and an independent.

Dr. Donkupar Roy was elected as Speaker of Meghalaya Legislative Assembly along with Metbah Lyngdoh, Kyrmen Shylla and Lahkmen Rymbui sworn in as minister in the Conrad Sangma government.

In February 2019, United Democratic Party left North-East Democratic Alliance (NEDA) over the Citizenship (Amendment) Bill.

In 2019, Metbah Lyngdoh was elected president of the party after the death of Donkupar Roy and he was also named speaker of the Meghalaya Legislative Assembly.

In 2023 Meghalaya legislative assembly election, the UDP came second behind National People's Party (India) by winning 12 seats in the 2023 Meghalaya legislative assembly election. It joined the MDA government.

== Electoral performance ==
Election	Votes	Vote %	Seats contested	Seats won	Seats +/-	Vote % +/-
Meghalaya Legislative Assembly
1998	226,026	26.99		20 / 60	Steady	Steady
2003	144,255	15.99		09 / 60	▼11	▼11
2008	202,511	18.37	53	11 / 60	▲2	▲2.38
2013	225,676	17.1		08 / 60	▼3	▼1.27
2018	183,005	11.6	27	06 / 60	▼2	▼5.5
2023	300,747	16.21	46	11 / 60	▲5	▲4.61

== List of presidents ==
No.	Portrait	Name (Birth–Death)	Term in office		
No.	Portrait	Name (Birth–Death)	Assumed office	Left office	Time in office
1		E. K. Mawlong	1997	2004	7 years,
3		Donkupar Roy	2004	2019	15 years
3		Metbah Lyngdoh	11 September 2019	Incumbent	7 years, 45 days

== List of chief ministers ==
- B. B. Lyngdoh
  - First term: 10 March 1998 to 8 March 2000
- E. K. Mawlong
  - First term: 8 March 2000 to 8 December 2001
- Dr. Donkupar Roy
  - First term: 19 March 2008 to 18 March 2009

== See also ==
- List of political parties in India
