= Meghalaya =

State in northeastern India

- State
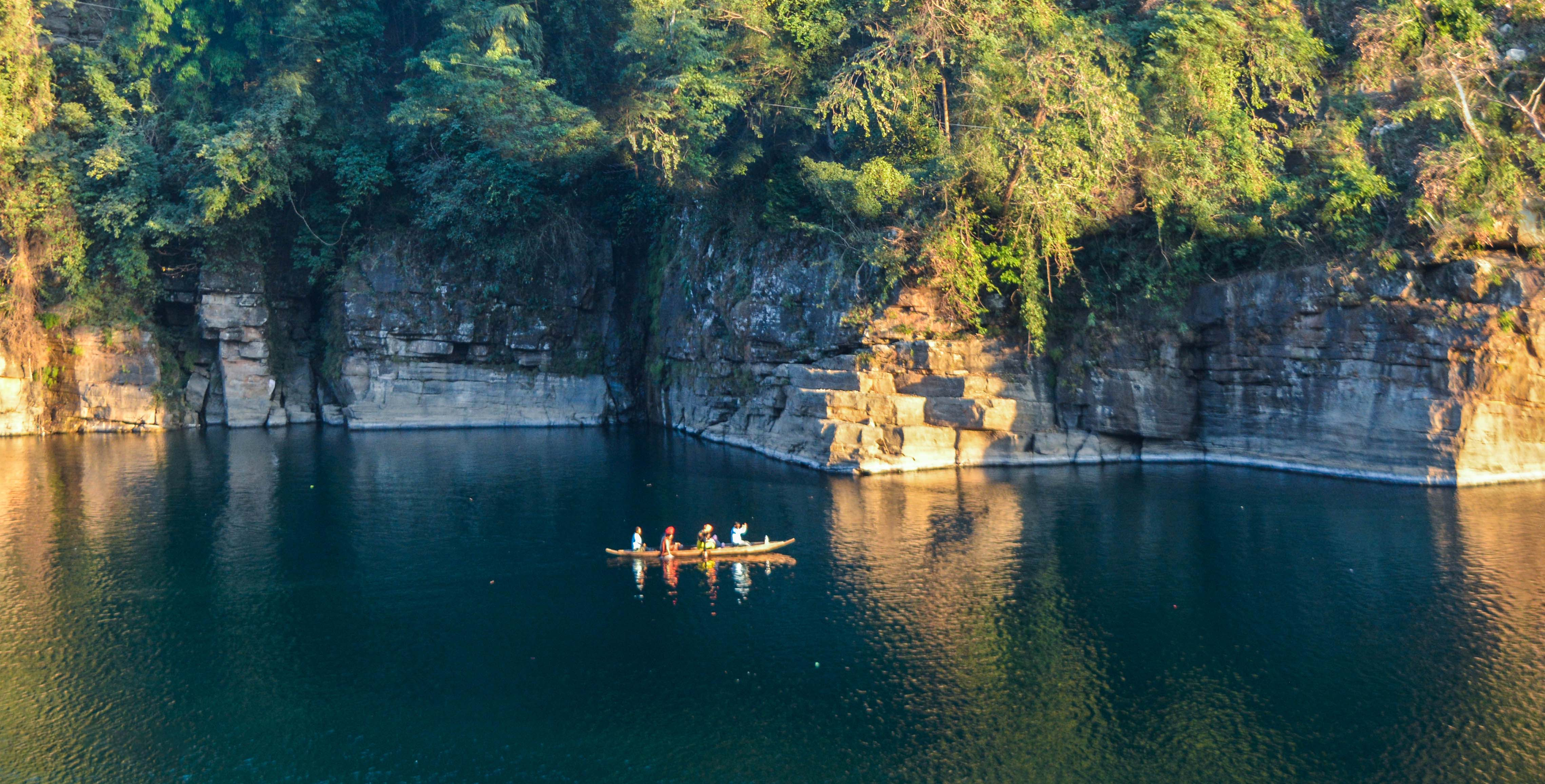
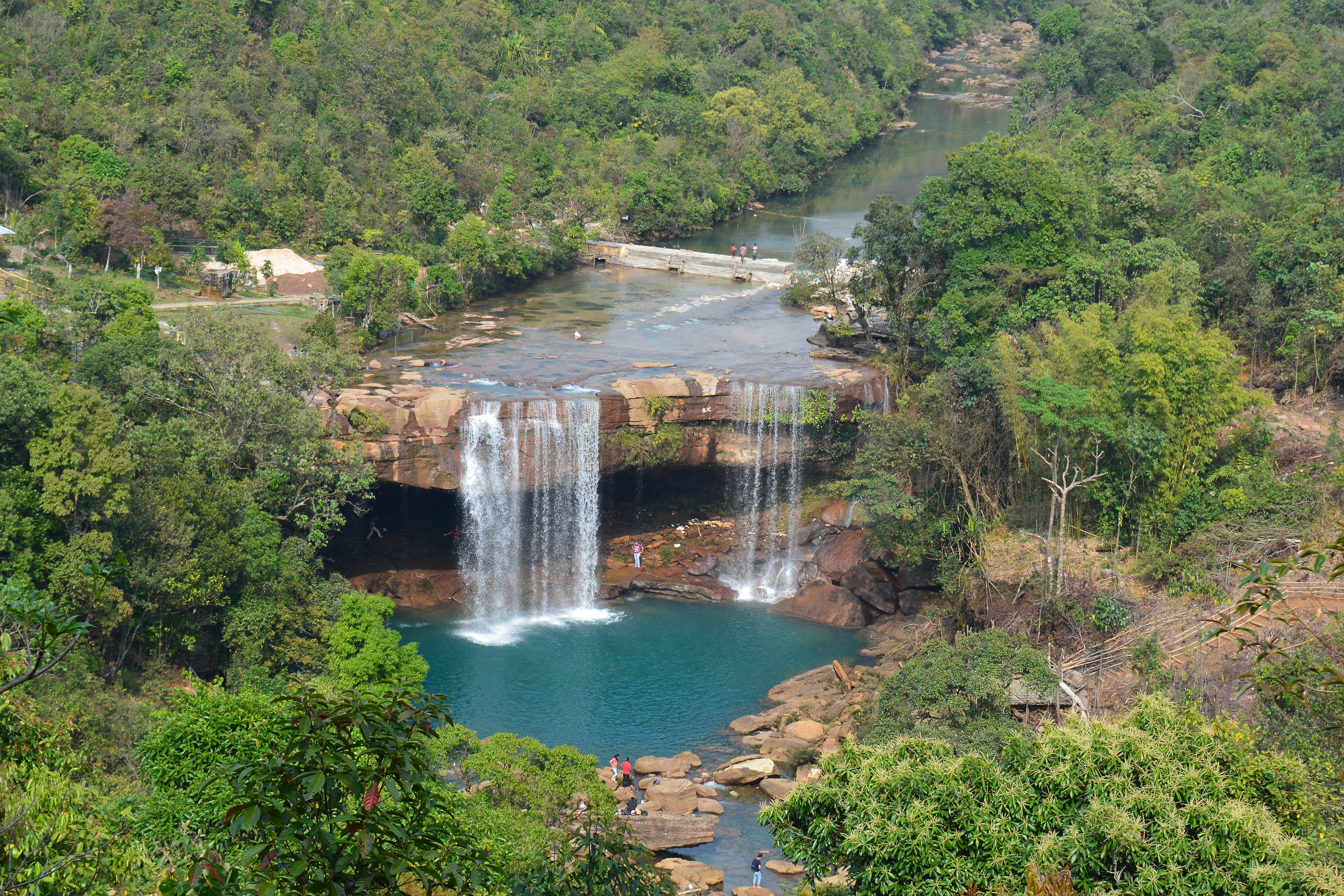
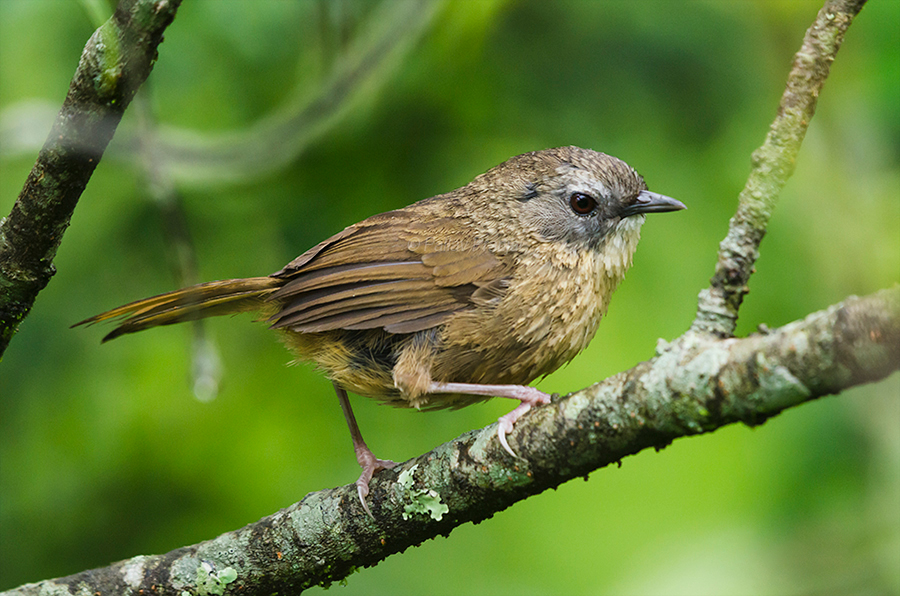
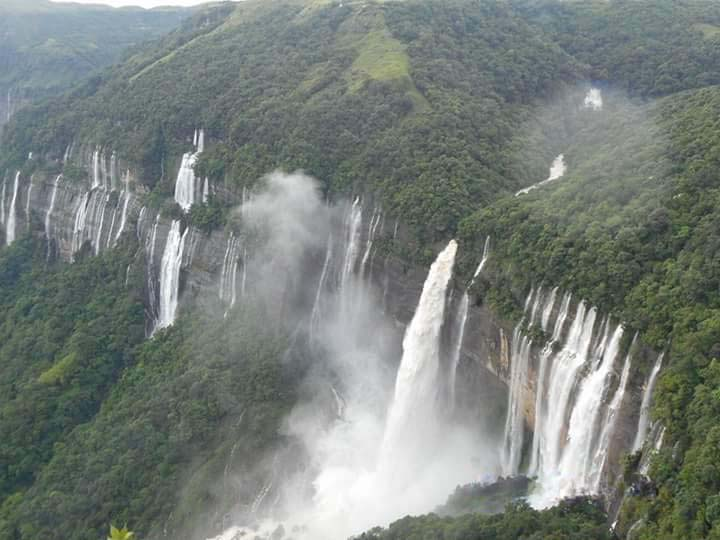
- Umngot River Krang Suri Falls Tawny-breasted wren-babbler Nohkalikai Falls

- Emblem of Meghalaya
- Etymology: "Abode of Clouds"
- Motto: Satyameva Jayate (Sanskrit) "Truth alone triumphs"
- Anthem: Ri Khasi, Ri Pnar, Ri Garo (Khasi, Pnar and Garo) "Meghalaya, My Land"
- Location of Meghalaya in India
- Coordinates: 25.57°N 91.88°E
- Country: India
- Region: Northeast India
- Previously was: Part of Undivided Assam
- Formation: 21 January 1972
- Capital and largest city: Shillong
- Districts: 12

Government
  - Body: Government of Meghalaya
  - Governor: C. H. Vijayashankar
  - Chief Minister: Conrad Sangma (NPP)

Area
  - Total: 22,429 km^{2} (8,660 sq mi)
  - Rank: 24th

Dimensions
  - Length: 300 km (190 mi)
  - Width: 100 km (62 mi)
- Highest elevation (Shillong Peak): 1,965 m (6,447 ft)
- Lowest elevation (Brahmaputra River): 150 m (490 ft)

Population (2011)
  - Total: ▲2,966,889
  - Rank: 22nd
  - Density: 130/km^{2} (340/sq mi)
  - Urban: 20.07%
  - Rural: 79.93%
- Demonym: Meghalayans

Language
  - Official: English, Khasi, Garo
  - Official script: Latin script

GDP
  - Total (2026-27): ▲₹0.763 lakh crore (US$7.9 billion)
  - Rank: 27th
  - Per capita: ▲₹174,090 (US$1,800) (29th)
- Time zone: UTC+05:30 (IST)
- ISO 3166 code: IN-ML
- Vehicle registration: ML
- HDI (2023): ▲0.690 medium (24th)
- Literacy (2024): 94.2% (5th)
- Sex ratio (2011): 989♀/1000 ♂ (3rd)
- Website: meghalaya.gov.in
- Symbols of Meghalaya
- Foundation day: 21 January 1972
- Bird: Hill myna
- Fish: Neolissochilus hexagonolepis
- Flower: Lady's Slipper Orchid
- Mammal: Clouded leopard
- Tree: Gamhar
- State highway mark
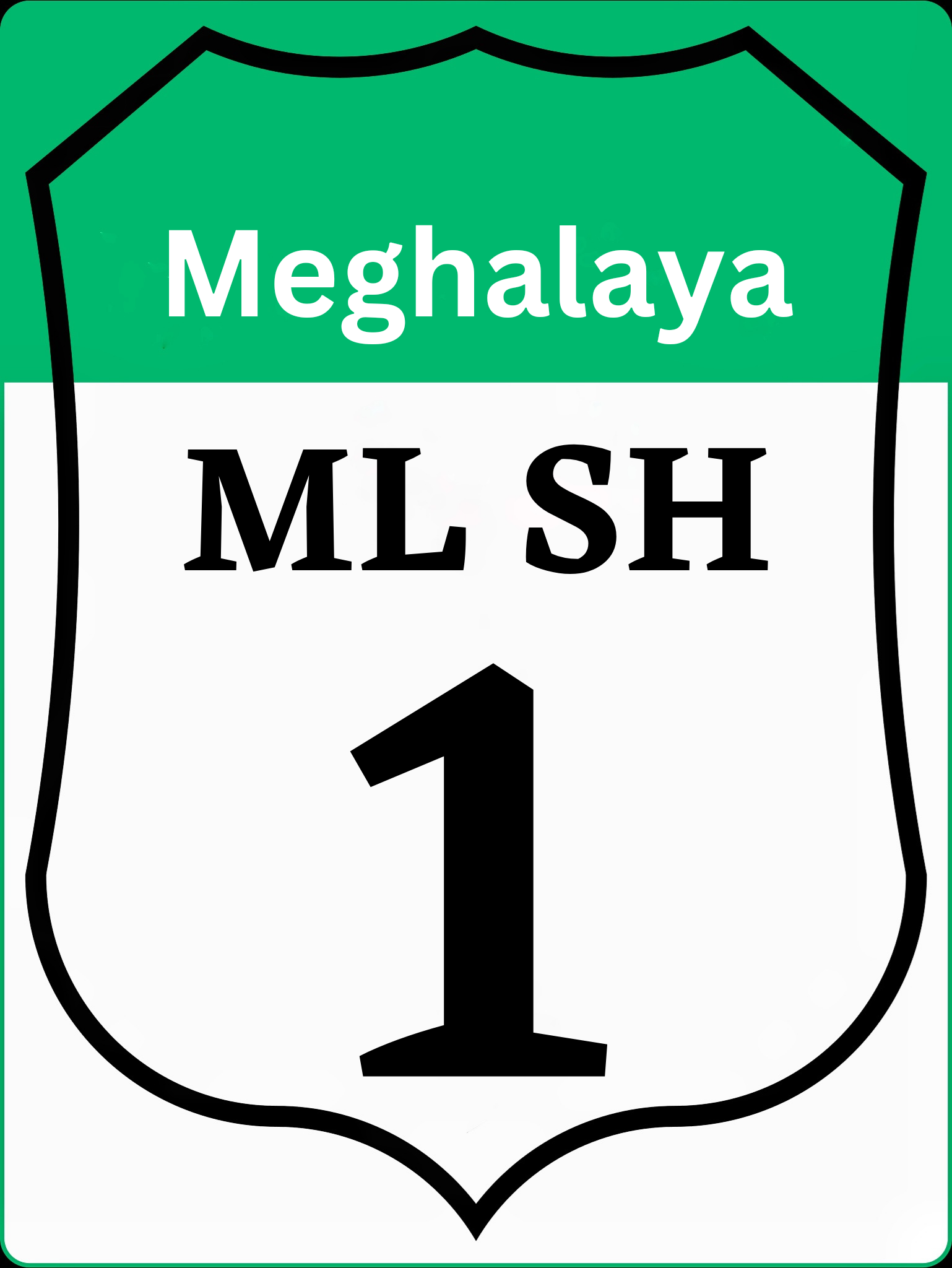
- State highway of Meghalaya
- List of Indian state symbols

Meghalaya (/ˌmeɪɡəˈleɪə, meɪˈɡɑːləjə/; lit. "the abode of clouds") is a state in northeast India, with Shillong as its capital city. Meghalaya was formed on 21 January 1972 as a new state by carving out two districts from the state of Assam: the united Khasi Hills and Jaintia Hills, and the Garo Hills. The estimated population of Meghalaya in 2014 was 3,211,474. Meghalaya covers an area of approximately 22,429 square kilometres, with a length-to-breadth ratio of about 3:1. The state is bound to the south by the Bangladeshi divisions of Mymensingh and Sylhet, to the west by the Bangladeshi division of Rangpur, and to the north and east by India's Assam.

During the British rule of India, the British authorities nicknamed it the "Scotland of the East". English, Khasi, and Garo are the official languages of Meghalaya. Unlike many Indian states, Meghalaya has historically followed a matrilineal system where the lineage and inheritance are traced through women; the youngest daughter inherits all wealth and she also takes care of her parents.

The state is the wettest region of India, with the wettest areas in the southern Khasi Hills recording an average of 12,000 mm (470 in) of rain a year. About 70 per cent of the state is forested. The Meghalaya subtropical forests ecoregion encompasses the state; its mountain forests are distinct from the lowland tropical forests to the north and south. The forests are notable for their biodiversity of mammals, birds and plants.

Meghalaya has a predominantly agrarian economy with a significant commercial forestry industry. The important crops are potatoes, rice, maize, pineapples, bananas, papayas and spices. The service sector is made up of real estate and insurance companies. Meghalaya's gross state domestic product for 2012 was estimated at ₹16,173 crore (US$1.7 billion) in current prices. The state is geologically rich in minerals, but it has no significant industries. The state has about 1,170 km (730 mi) of national highways. It is also a major logistical centre for trade with Bangladesh.

In July 2018, the International Commission on Stratigraphy divided the Holocene epoch into three, with the late Holocene epoch being called the Meghalayan stage/age, since a speleothem in Mawmluh cave indicating a dramatic worldwide climate event around 2250 BCE had been chosen as the boundary stratotype.

One of the biggest Central Institutes, the North Eastern Council Secretariat, is also situated in Shillong.

== Etymology ==
The word Meghālaya means "the abode of clouds"; the name derives from a compound of the Sanskrit words megha ("cloud", मेघ) and alaya ("abode", आलय).

== History ==
Meghalaya, alongside the neighbouring Indian states, has been of archaeological interest. People have lived in Meghalaya since the Neolithic period. So far, Neolithic sites have been found in high-elevation areas of the Khasi Hills, the Garo Hills, and neighbouring states, where Neolithic-style Jhum, or shifting cultivation, is still practised today. The highland plateaus fed by abundant rains provided safety from floods and rich soil. The importance of Meghalaya is its possible role in human history via the domestication of rice. A theory for the origin of rice is by Ian Glover, who states, "India is the centre of greatest diversity of domesticated rice with over 20,000 identified species and Northeast India is the most favourable single area of the origin of domesticated rice." The limited archaeology done in the hills of Meghalaya suggests human settlement since ancient times.

After the Conquest of Taraf in 1304, Shah Arifin Rafiuddin, a disciple of Shah Jalal, migrated to and settled in the Khasi and Jaintia Hills, where he preached Islamic monotheism to the local people. His khanqah stands at Sarping / Laurergarh on the Bangladeshi border, but the part containing his mazar is in Meghalaya, on top of Laur Hill.

Bhaitbari is an archaeological site first discovered and excavated by A. K. Sharma in 1993. A fortification of burnt brick with mud core was discovered at Meghalaya - Assam border and is dated to 4th-8th century AD. The city has been speculated to have been one of the capital cities of Kamarupa. The Khasi, Garo, and Jaintia tribes had their own kingdoms and chiefdoms until they came under British administration in the 19th century. The eastern region was part of the medieval Jaintia Kingdom, which was ruled by Pnars or Jaintias.

The British incorporated Meghalaya into Assam in 1835. They discovered Camellia sinensis (tea shrub) in 1834 in Assam, and from 1839 onwards companies started renting land for tea cultivation. The region had semi-independent status under a treaty relationship with the British Crown. When Bengal was partitioned on 16 October 1905 by Lord Curzon, Meghalaya became a part of the new province of Eastern Bengal and Assam. When the partition was reversed in 1912, Meghalaya became a part of the province of Assam. On 3 January 1921, under Section 52A of the Government of India Act 1919, the governor-general-in-council declared the areas now in Meghalaya, other than the Khasi states, as "backward tracts." Subsequently, the British administration enacted the Government of India Act 1935, which regrouped the backward tracts into two categories: "excluded" and "partially excluded" areas.

At the time of Indian independence in 1947, present-day Meghalaya constituted two districts of Assam and enjoyed limited autonomy within the state of Assam. A movement for a separate hill state began in 1960. On 11 September 1968, the Government of India announced a scheme for constituting an autonomous state within the state of Assam comprising certain areas specified in Part A of the table appended to paragraph 20 of the Sixth Schedule to the Constitution. Accordingly, the Assam Reorganisation (Meghalaya) Act of 1969 was enacted for the formation of an autonomous state. Meghalaya was formed by carving out two districts from the state of Assam: the United Khasi Hills and Jaintia Hills, and the Garo Hills. The name 'Meghalaya' coined by geographer S.P. Chatterjee in 1936 was proposed and accepted for the new state. The Act came into effect on 2 April 1970, with the autonomous state having a 37-member legislature in accordance with the Sixth Schedule to the Indian constitution.

In 1971, the Parliament passed the North-Eastern Areas (Reorganisation) Act, 1971, which conferred full statehood on the autonomous state of Meghalaya. Meghalaya attained statehood on 21 January 1972, with a Legislative Assembly of its own.

== Geography ==
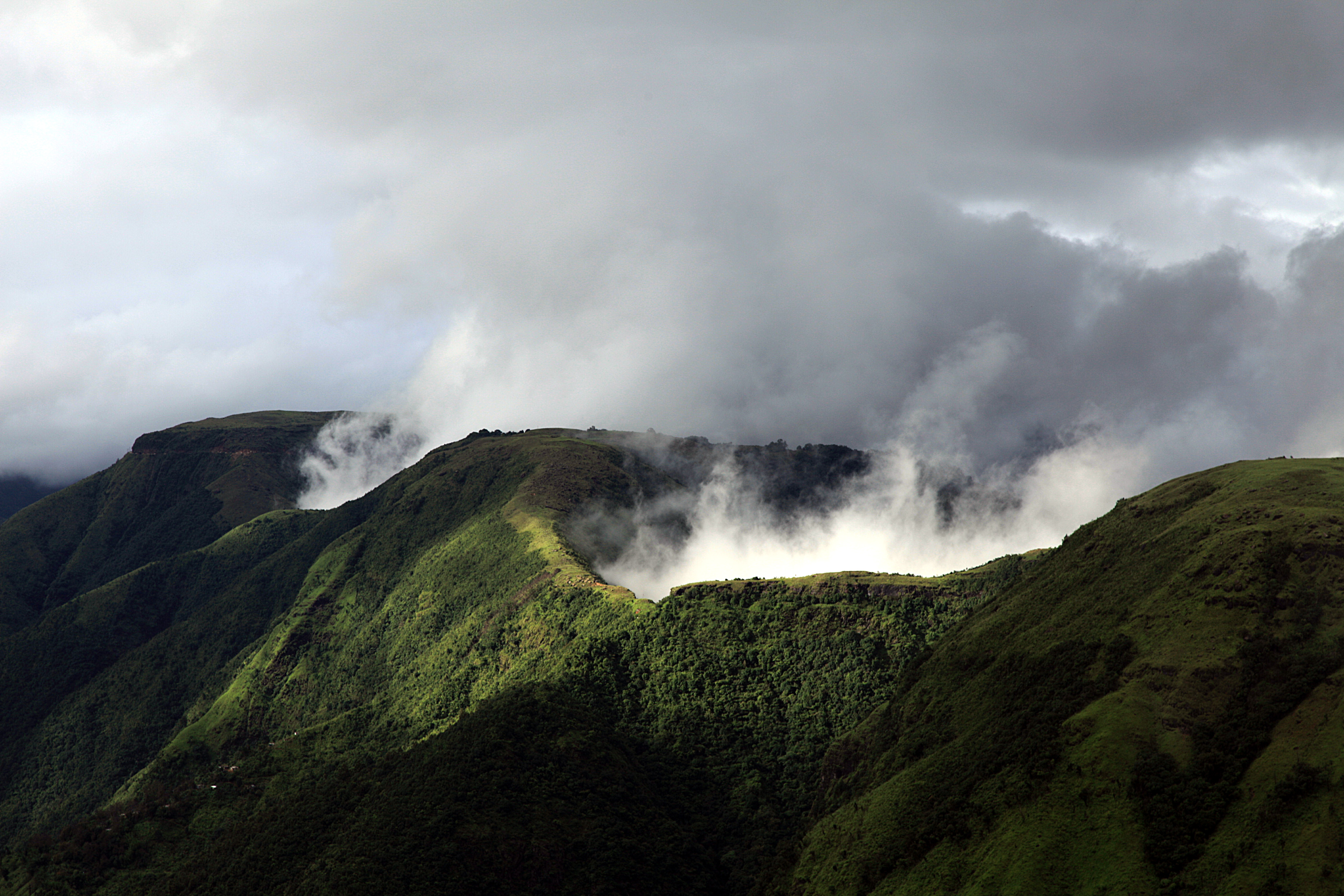
Laitmawsiang landscape, wrapped in fog. Meghalaya is mountainous, and it is the rainiest state of India. The word Meghalaya means, "abode of the clouds".

Meghalaya is one of the Seven Sister States of northeast India. The state of Meghalaya is mountainous, with stretches of valley and highland plateaus, and it is geologically rich. It consists mainly of Archean rock formations. These rock formations contain rich deposits of valuable minerals like coal, limestone, uranium and sillimanite. The name Meghalaya was given by Shiba P. Chatterjee, a geography professor at the University of Calcutta.

Relief map of Meghalaya

Meghalaya has many rivers. Most of these are rainfed and seasonal. The important rivers in the Garo Hills region are Ganol, Daring, Sanda, Bandra, Bugai, Dareng, Simsang, Nitai and the Bhupai. In the central and eastern sections of the plateau, the important rivers are Khri, Umtrew, Digaru, Umiam or Barapani, Kynshi (Jadukata), Umngi, Mawpa, Umiam Khwan, Umngot, Umkhen, Myntdu and Myntang. In the southern Khasi Hills region, these rivers have created deep gorges and several waterfalls.

The elevation of the plateau ranges between 150 m (490 ft) to 1,961 m (6,434 ft). The central part of the plateau comprising the Khasi Hills has the highest elevations, followed by the eastern section comprising the Jaintia Hills region. The highest point in Meghalaya is Shillong Peak, which is a prominent IAF station in the Khasi Hills overlooking the city of Shillong. It has an altitude of 1961 m. The Garo Hills region in the western section of the plateau is nearly plain. The highest point in the Garo Hills is Nokrek Peak with an altitude of 1515 m.

=== Climate ===
With the average annual rainfall as high as 12,000 mm (470 in) in some areas, Meghalaya is the wettest place on Earth. The western part of the plateau, comprising the Garo Hills region with lower elevations, experiences high temperatures for most of the year. The Shillong area, with the highest elevations, experiences generally low temperatures. The maximum temperature in this region rarely goes beyond 28 °C (82 °F), whereas sub-zero winter temperatures are common. The climate classification type is almost entirely of the humid subtropical climate type.

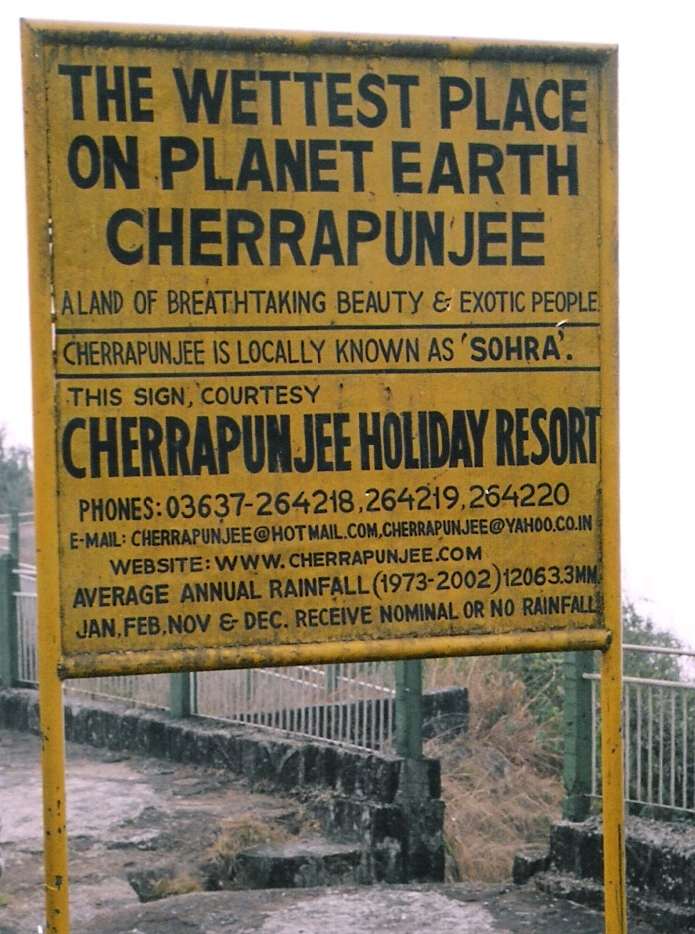
A sign board in Cherrapunji

The town of Cherrapunji (Sohra) in the Khasi Hills south of capital Shillong holds the world record for most rain in a calendar month, while the village of Mawsynram, near Cherrapunji, holds the record for the most rain in a year.

=== Flora and fauna ===
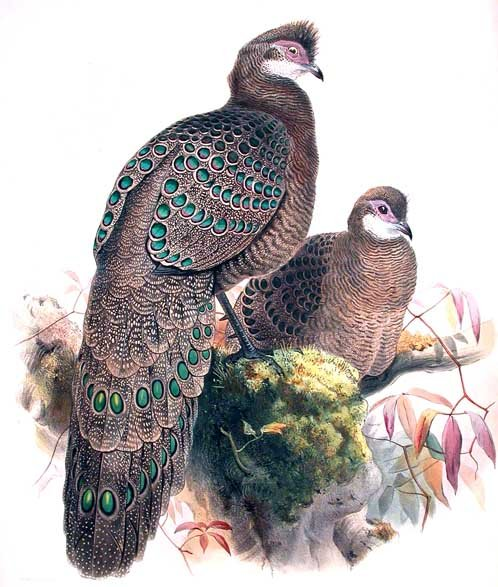
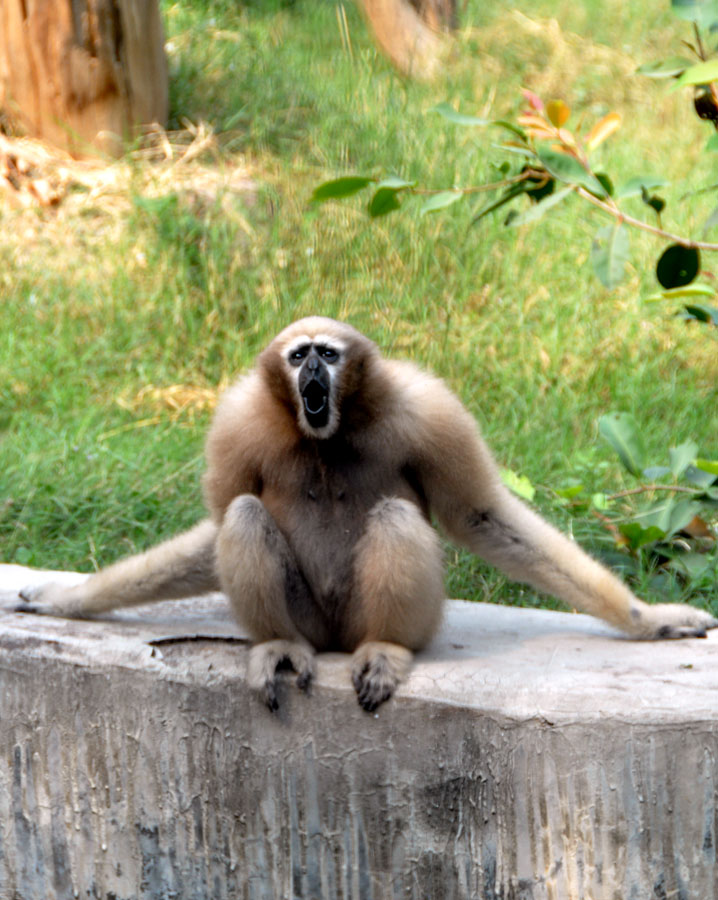
Meghalaya's forests host 660 species of birds and numerous species of other wildlife. Peacock pheasant (top) and hoolock gibbon (bottom) are found in Meghalaya.

About 70% of the state is forested, of which 9,496 km^{2} (3,666 sq mi) is dense primary subtropical forest. The Meghalayan forests are considered to be among the richest botanical habitats of Asia. These forests receive abundant rainfall and support a vast variety of floral and faunal biodiversity. A small portion of the forest area in Meghalaya is under what are known as "sacred groves" (see Sacred groves of India). These are small pockets of an ancient forest that have been preserved by the communities for hundreds of years due to religious and cultural beliefs. These forests are reserved for religious rituals and generally remain protected from any exploitation. These sacred groves harbour many rare plant and animal species. The Nokrek Biosphere Reserve in the West Garo Hills and the Balpakram National Park in the South Garo Hills are considered to be the most biodiversity-rich sites in Meghalaya. In addition, Meghalaya has four wildlife sanctuaries. These are the Nongkhyllem Wildlife Sanctuary, the Siju Wildlife Sanctuary, the Narpuh Wildlife Sanctuary and the Baghmara Pitcher Plant Wildlife Sanctuary, which is also the home of the only insect-eating pitcher plant in India called Nepenthes khasiana also called "Me'mang Koksi" in the Garo language.

Due to diverse climatic and topographic conditions, Meghalaya forests support a vast floral diversity, including a large variety of parasites, epiphytes, succulent plants and shrubs. Two of the most important tree varieties are Shorea robusta (sal tree) and Tectona grandis (teak). Meghalaya is also the home to a large variety of fruits, vegetables, spices, and medicinal plants. Meghalaya is also famous for its large variety of orchids — nearly 325 of them. Of these, the largest variety is found in the Mawsmai, Mawmluh and Sohrarim forests in the Khasi hills.

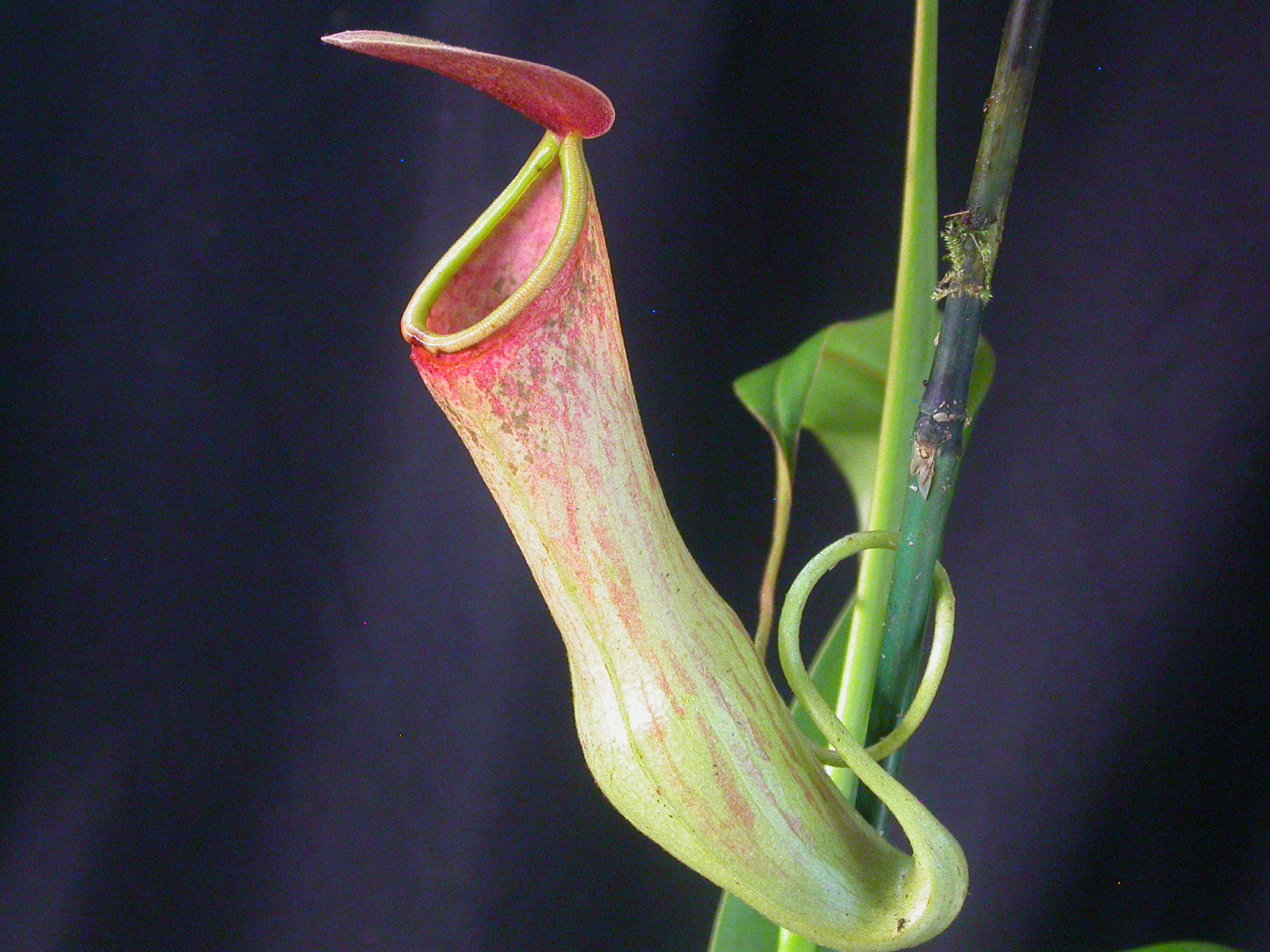
Nepenthes khasiana

Meghalaya also has a large variety of mammals, birds, reptiles and insects. The important mammal species include elephants, bear, red pandas, small Indian civets, mongooses, weasels, rodents, gaur, wild buffalo, deer, wild boar and a number of primates. Meghalaya also has a large variety of bats. The limestone caves in Meghalaya such as the Siju Cave are home to some of the nation's rarest bat species. The hoolock gibbon is found in all districts of Meghalaya.

Common reptiles in Meghalaya are lizards, crocodiles and tortoises. Meghalaya also has a number of snakes including the python, copperhead, green tree racer, Indian cobra, king cobra, coral snake and vipers.

Meghalaya's forests host 660 species of birds, many of which are endemic to Himalayan foothills, Tibet and Southeast Asia. Of the birds found in Meghalaya forests, 34 are on worldwide threatened species list and 9 are on the critically endangered list. Prominent birds spotted in Meghalaya include those from the families of Phasianidae, Anatidae, Podicipedidae, Ciconiidae, Threskiornithidae, Ardeidae, Pelecanidae, Phalacrocoracidae, Anhingidae, Falconidae, Accipitridae, Otididae, Rallidae, Heliornithidae, Gruidae, Turnicidae, Burhinidae, Charadriidae, Glareolidae, Scolopacidae, Jacanidae, Columbidae, Psittacidae, Cuculidae, Strigidae, Caprimulgidae, Apodidae, Alcedinidae, Bucerotidae, Ramphastidae, Picidae, Campephagidae, Dicruridae, Corvidae, Hirundinidae, Cisticolidae, Pycnonotidae, Sylviidae, Timaliidae, Sittidae, Sturnidae, Turdidae, Nectariniidae and Muscicapidae. Each of these families have many species. The great Indian hornbill is the largest bird in Meghalaya. Other regional birds found include the grey peacock pheasant, the large Indian parakeet and the common green pigeon. Meghalaya is also home to over 250 species of butterflies, nearly a quarter of all butterfly species found in India.

In 2020, scientists have discovered the largest known subterranean fish in Meghalaya's Jaintia Hills.

Due to the presence of industrial activities in the region, some cities in Meghalaya face severe pollution. In 2025, The World Air Quality Report 2024 by Swiss air quality technology company IQAir ranked Byrnihat as the most polluted city in the world.

== Demographics ==
=== Population ===
Historical population
Year	Pop.	±%
1901	340,524	—
1911	394,005	+15.7%
1921	422,404	+7.2%
1931	480,820	+13.8%
1941	555,820	+15.6%
1951	605,674	+9.0%
1961	769,380	+27.0%
1971	1,011,699	+31.5%
1981	1,335,819	+32.0%
1991	1,774,778	+32.9%
2001	2,318,822	+30.7%
2011	2,966,889	+27.9%
Source: Census of India

Tribal people make up the majority of Meghalaya's population. The Khasis are the largest group, followed by the Garos then the Jaintias. These were among those known to the British as "hill tribes." Other groups include the Bengali, Hajongs, the Biates, the Koches and related Rajbongshis, the Boros, Dimasa, Kuki, Lakhar, Tiwa (Lalung), Karbi, Rabha and Nepali.

Meghalaya recorded the highest decennial population growth of 27.82% among all the seven north-eastern states, as per the provisional report of census 2011. The population of Meghalaya as of 2011 has been estimated at 2,964,007 of which females constitute 1,492,668 and males 1,471,339. As per the census of India 2011, the sex ratio in the state was 986 females per 1,000 males which was far higher than the national average of 940. The urban female sex ratio of 985 was higher than the rural sex ratio of 972.

=== Religion ===
Growth of Religions in Meghalaya (1951–2011)
Census Year	Christianity (%)	Hinduism (%)	Islam (%)	Tribal Religion (%)
1951	65.47	10.99	0.17	23.19
1961	66.72	11.75	0.24	21.03
1971	68.03	12.14	0.36	19.11
1981	70.53	12.39	0.52	15.99
1991	64.58	13.27	3.83	17.27
2001	70.25	13.27	4.28	11.68
2011	74.59	11.52	4.40	8.70

Religion in Meghalaya (2011)
1. Christianity (74.6%)
2. Hinduism (11.5%)
3. Tribal religions (8.70%)
4. Islam (4.39%)
5. Buddhism (0.33%)
6. Jainism (0.02%)
7. Sikhism (0.10%)
8. Others (0.35%)

Meghalaya is one of three states in India to have a Christian majority. About 75% of the population practices Christianity, with Catholics, Presbyterians, Baptists, and Church of God the more common denominations. The religion of the people in Meghalaya is closely related to their ethnicity. Close to 90% of the Garo and nearly 80% of the Khasi are Christian, while more than 97% of the Hajong, 98.53% of the Koch, and 94.60% of the Rabha tribes are Hindus. A minority of Garo and Khasi are also Hindus mainly because of the influence of Hindu populations in Hindu majority villages.

Hindus are the largest religious minority in Meghalaya with 11.52% of the total state's population as of the 2011 census. Hindus are concentrated mainly in West Garo Hills, East Khasi Hills and Ri-Bhoi with 19.11 per cent, 17.55 per cent and 11.96 per cent respectively. The Nartiang Durga Temple is a major Hindu temple in Meghalaya and it is one of the 51 Shakta pithas on Earth.

Indigenous Faiths are followed by 8.7% of population. The indigenous faiths of Meghalaya are Niamtre, followed by Jaintia people, Niam Khasi and Niam Tynrai, followed by Khasi tribe and Songsarek followed by the Garo people.

Muslims constitute 4.39% of the population and are concentrated mainly in West Garo Hills, where they make up 16.60% of the population. And there is also a very small community of Khasi Muslims, mostly residing in Shillong and adjoining areas of the city, who accepted Sunni Islam as a result of historic Muslim traders in the region. On 3 February 2019, the Quran, the Islamic Holy Book, was released in the Khasi language. The translation of 1251 pre-pages and pages of the Quran, was done by a Khasi Muslim leader Mubarak Lyngdoh, to propagate Islam among the local Khasis. The translation was done at the initiative of the Seng Bhalang Islam (A local Islamic organisation of Shillong, Meghalaya). Khasi Muslims number around 1,689 in Meghalaya as per the 2011 census, though others are found in neighbouring states also.

Conversion from indigenous religions to Christianity began in the 19th century during the British colonial era. In the 1830s, American Baptist Foreign Missionary Society had become active in Northeast India to convert indigenous tribes to Christianity. Later, they were offered to expand and reach into Cherrapunji Meghalaya, but they declined out of the lack of resources. Taking up the offer, the Welsh Presbyterian Mission began work at the Cherrapunji mission field. The Salvatorians missionaries of the Catholic Church reached Shillong in 1890. By the early 1900s, other Protestant denominations of Christianity were active in Meghalaya. The outbreak of the World Wars forced the preachers to return home to Europe and America. It is during this period that Catholicism took root in Meghalaya and neighbouring regions. In the 20th century, Union Christian College started operations at Umiam, Shillong. Currently, Presbyterians and Catholics are two most common Christian denominations found in Meghalaya.

=== Languages ===
Languages of Meghalaya in 2011
1. Khasi (33.8%)
2. Garo (31.6%)
3. Pnar (10.7%)
4. Bengali (6.44%)
5. Nepali (1.85%)
6. War (1.73%)
7. Hindi (1.62%)
8. Hajong (1.40%)
9. Assamese (1.34%)
10. Others (9.51%)

English is the official language of the state, while Khasi and Garo were accorded full official status in 2026. The most spoken languages in Meghalaya are Khasi (33.82%) and Garo (31.60%) followed by Pnar (10.69%), Bengali (6.44%), Nepali (1.85%), War (1.73%), Hindi (1.62%), Hajong (1.40%) and Assamese (1.34%).

Khasi (also spelled Khasia, Khassee, Cossyah, and Kyi) is a branch of the Mon–Khmer family of the Austroasiatic stock and according to 2001 census, Khasi is spoken by about 1,128,575 people residing in Meghalaya. Many words in the Khasi language have been borrowed from Indo-Aryan languages such as Assamese, Bengali and Nepali. Moreover, the Khasi language originally had no script of its own. The Khasi language is one of the very few surviving Mon–Khmer languages in India today.

The Garo language has a close affinity with the Bodo languages, a small family of Tibeto-Burman languages. Garo, spoken by the majority of the population, is spoken in many dialects such as Abeng or Ambeng, Atong, Akawe (or Awe), Matchi Dual, Chibok, Chisak Megam or Lyngngam, Ruga, Gara-Ganching and Matabeng.

Pnar is spoken by many people of both the West and East Jaintia Hills. The language is related to the Khasi language. Apart from the main languages, various local dialect are being spoken by the War Jaintia (West Jaintia Hills), Maram and Lynngam (West Khasi Hills), War Pynursla (East Khasi Hills), Tiwa language by Tiwa peoples of Ri-Bhoi district. Another example is the Biate language spoken by many people inhabiting the south-eastern part of Meghalaya bordering Assam.

Indo-Aryan languages like Assamese, Bengali, Hajong, Hindi and Nepali are spoken by many people residing mostly in the East Khasi Hills district and the West Garo Hills district.

English is spoken as a common language across the diverse ethnic and demographic groups. In urban centres most of the people can speak English; rural residents vary in their ability.

== Districts ==
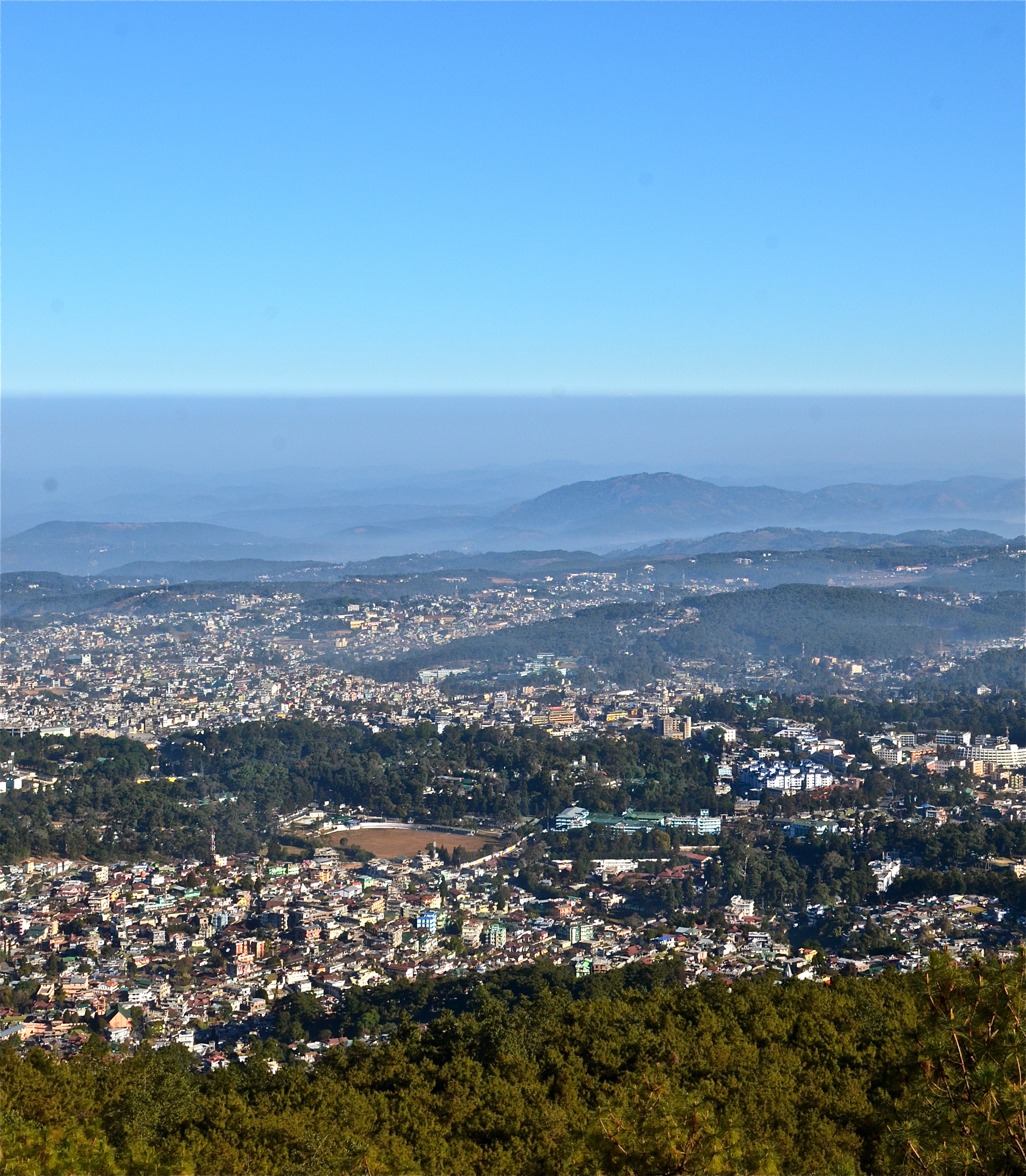
An aerial view of the state capital, Shillong.

Meghalaya currently has 12 districts.

Jaintia Hills Division:

- West Jaintia Hills (Jowai)
- East Jaintia Hills (Khliehriat)

Khasi Hills Division:

- East Khasi Hills (Shillong)
- West Khasi Hills (Nongstoin)
- South West Khasi Hills (Mawkyrwat)
- Ri-Bhoi (Nongpoh)
- Eastern West Khasi Hills (Mairang)

Garo Hills Division:

- North Garo Hills (Resubelpara)
- East Garo Hills (Williamnagar)
- South Garo Hills (Baghmara)
- West Garo Hills (Tura)
- South West Garo Hills (Ampati)

The Jaintia Hills district was created on 22 February 1972. It has a total geographical area of 3,819 square kilometres (1,475 sq mi) and a population of 295,692 as per the 2001 census. The district headquarters is in Jowai. Jaintia Hills district is the largest producer of coal in the state. Coal mines can be seen all over the district. Limestone production in the state is increasing, as there is high demand from cement industries. Recently, the one big district was divided into two: West Jaintia Hills district and East Jaintia Hills district.

The East Khasi Hills district was carved out of the Khasi Hills on 28 October 1976. The district has covered an area of 2,748 square kilometres (1,061 sq mi) and has a population of 660,923 as per the 2001 census. The headquarters of East Khasi Hills is located in Shillong.

The Ri-Bhoi district was formed by the further division of East Khasi Hills district on 4 June 1992. It has an area of 2,448 square kilometres (945 sq mi). The total population of the district was 192,795 in the 2001 census. The district headquarters is at Nongpoh. It has a hilly terrain, and a large part of the area is covered with forests. The Ri-Bhoi district is known for its pineapples and is the largest producer of pineapples in the state.

The West Khasi Hills district is the largest district in the state with a geographical area of 5,247 square kilometres (2,026 sq mi). The district was carved out of Khasi Hills District on 28 October 1976. The district headquarters are located at Nongstoin.

The East Garo Hills district was formed in 1976 and has a population of 247,555 as per the 2001 census. It covers an area of 2,603 square kilometres (1,005 sq mi). The District Headquarters are at Williamnagar, earlier known as Simsangiri. Nongalbibra, a town in this district, has many coal mines. The coal is transported to Goalpara and Jogighopa via NH62.

The West Garo Hills district lies in the western part of the state and covers a geographical area of 3,714 square kilometres (1,434 sq mi). The population of the district is 515,813 as per the 2001 census. The district headquarters are located at Tura.

The South Garo Hills district came into existence on 18 June 1992 after the division of the West Garo Hills district. The total geographical area of the district is 1,850 square kilometres (710 sq mi). As per the 2001 census the district has a population of 99,100. The district headquarters are at Baghmara.

In 2012, there were 11 districts, 16 towns and an estimated 6,026 villages in Meghalaya. A 12th district, Eastern West Khasi Hills, was created in 2021.

The table below shows the human development index of various districts of Meghalaya, as of 2021.

Human development index (HDI) of various districts of Meghalaya, as of 2021
Rank	District	HDI score
1	East Khasi Hills	0.676
2	West Garo Hills	0.571
3	Ri Bhoi	0.496
4	South Garo Hills	0.484
5	Jaintia Hills	0.469
6	West Khasi Hills	0.405
7	East Garo Hills	0.396
	Meghalaya	0.550

== Education ==
=== Schools ===
Meghalaya schools are run by the state government, central government or by private organisations, including religious institutions. Instruction is only in English. Other Indian languages like Assamese, Bengali, Garo, Hindi, Khasi, Mizo, Nepali and Urdu are taught as optional subjects. The secondary schools are affiliated with the Meghalaya Board of School Education, the Indian School Certificate Examinations (CISCE), the Central Board for Secondary Education (CBSE), or the National Institute of Open School (NIOS).

=== Colleges ===
Indian Institute of Management, Shillong Campus

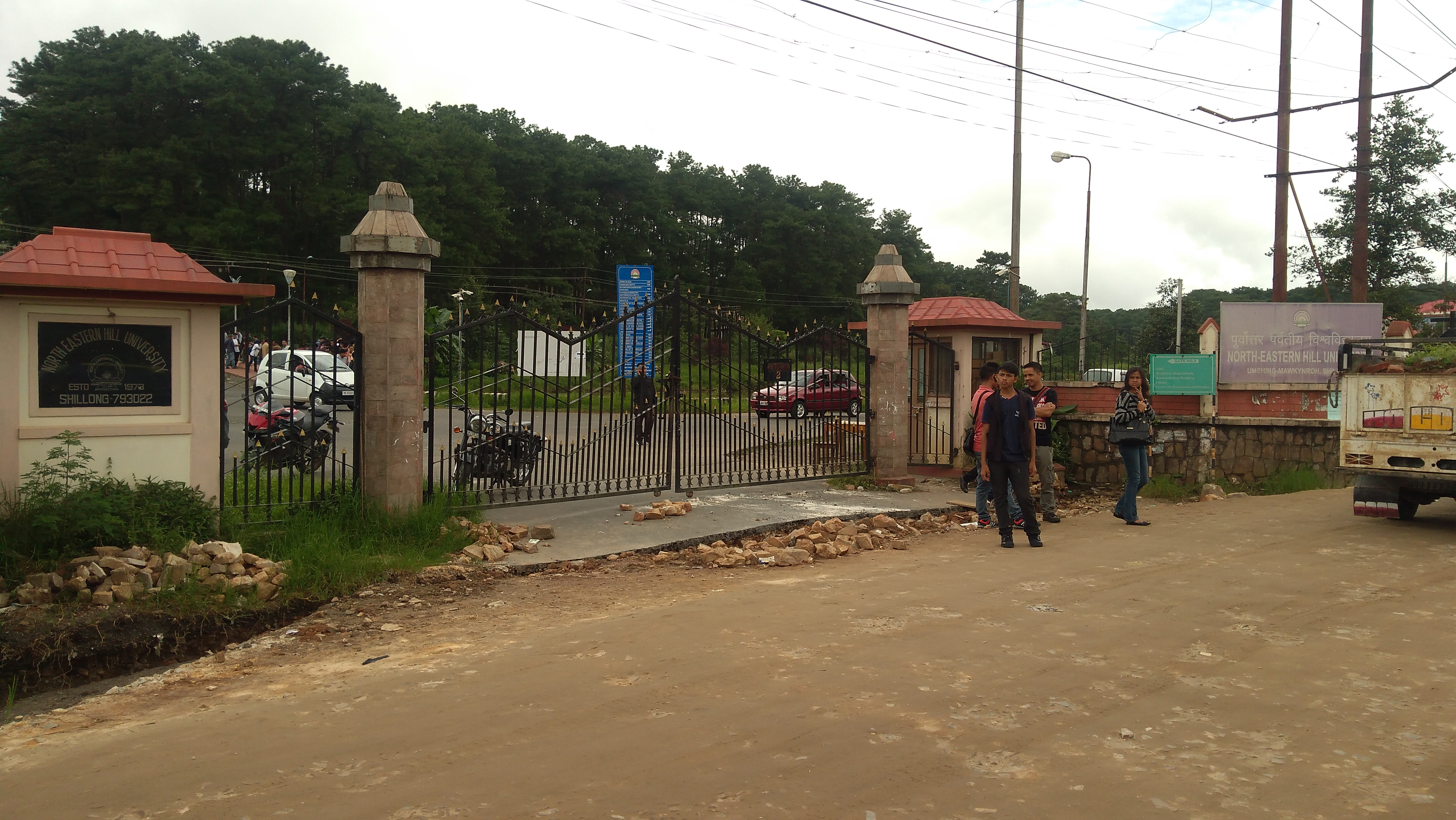
North-Eastern Hill University Campus, Mawlai, Shillong

- Don Bosco College, Tura
- Indian Institute of Management, Shillong
- Kiang Nangbah Government College, Jowai
- Lady Keane College, Shillong
- National Institute of Technology, Meghalaya,
- National Institute of Fashion Technology,
- Northeast Adventist College, Thadlaskien
- North Eastern Indira Gandhi Regional Institute of Health and Medical Sciences
- North Eastern Institute of Ayurveda and Homeopathy
- Nongtalang College, Nongtalang
- Regional Institute of Science and Technology
- Ri-Bhoi College, Nongpoh
- St. Edmund's College, Shillong
- Sankardev College, Shillong
- Seng Khasi College, Shillong
- Shillong College, Shillong
- Shillong Law College, Shillong
- Synod College, Shillong
- Tikrikilla College, Tikrikilla W.Garo Hills
- Tura Government College, Tura
- Tura Law College, Tura
- Union Christian College, Meghalaya
- Women's College, Shillong

=== Universities ===
- The English and Foreign Languages University, Shillong Campus
- Martin Luther Christian University, Meghalaya
- North Eastern Hill University (NEHU), Shillong
- University of Technology and Management, Meghalaya
- University of Science and Technology, Meghalaya (USTM), Meghalaya
- William Carey University, Meghalaya, Shillong
- CMJ University, Jorabat
- National Institute of Technology, Meghalaya

== Government and politics ==
Meghalaya's Governor is C. H. Vijayashankar since July 2024.

=== State government ===
The Meghalaya Legislative Assembly has 60 members at present. Meghalaya has two representatives in the Lok Sabha, one each from Shillong and Tura. It also has one representative in the Rajya Sabha.

Since the creation of the state the Gauhati High Court has jurisdiction in Meghalaya. A Circuit Bench of the Guwahati High Court has been functioning at Shillong since 1974. In March 2013, the Meghalaya High Court was separated from the Gauhati High Court and now the state has its own High Court.

=== Local self-government ===
Autonomous District Councils in Northeast India

To provide local self-governance machinery to the rural population of the country, provisions were made in the Constitution of India; accordingly, the Panchayati Raj institutions were set up. Because of distinct customs and traditions prevalent in the northeast region, it was felt necessary to have a separate political and administrative structure in the region. Some of the tribal communities in the region had their own traditional political systems, and it was felt that Panchayati Raj institutions may come into conflict with these traditional systems. The Sixth Schedule was appended to the Constitution on the recommendations of a subcommittee formed under the leadership of Gopinath Bordoloi, and the constitution of Autonomous District Councils is provided in certain rural areas of the northeast including areas in Meghalaya. The ADCs in Meghalaya are the following:

- Garo Hills Autonomous District Council
- Khasi Hills Autonomous District Council
- Jaintia Hills Autonomous District Council

== Economy ==
Meghalaya is predominantly an agrarian economy. Agriculture and allied activities engage nearly two-thirds of the total workforce in Meghalaya. This sector's contribution to the state's NSDP is about one-third. Agriculture in the state is characterised by low productivity and unsustainable farm practices. Despite the large percentage of the population engaged in agriculture, the state imports food from other Indian states. Infrastructural constraints have also prevented the economy of the state from creating high-income jobs at a pace commensurate with that of the rest of India.

Meghalaya's gross state domestic product for 2012 was estimated at ₹16,173 crore (US$1.7 billion) in current prices. As of 2012, according to the Reserve Bank of India, about 12% of total state population is below the poverty line, with 12.5% of the rural Meghalaya population is below the poverty line; while in urban areas, 9.3% are below the poverty line.

=== Agriculture ===
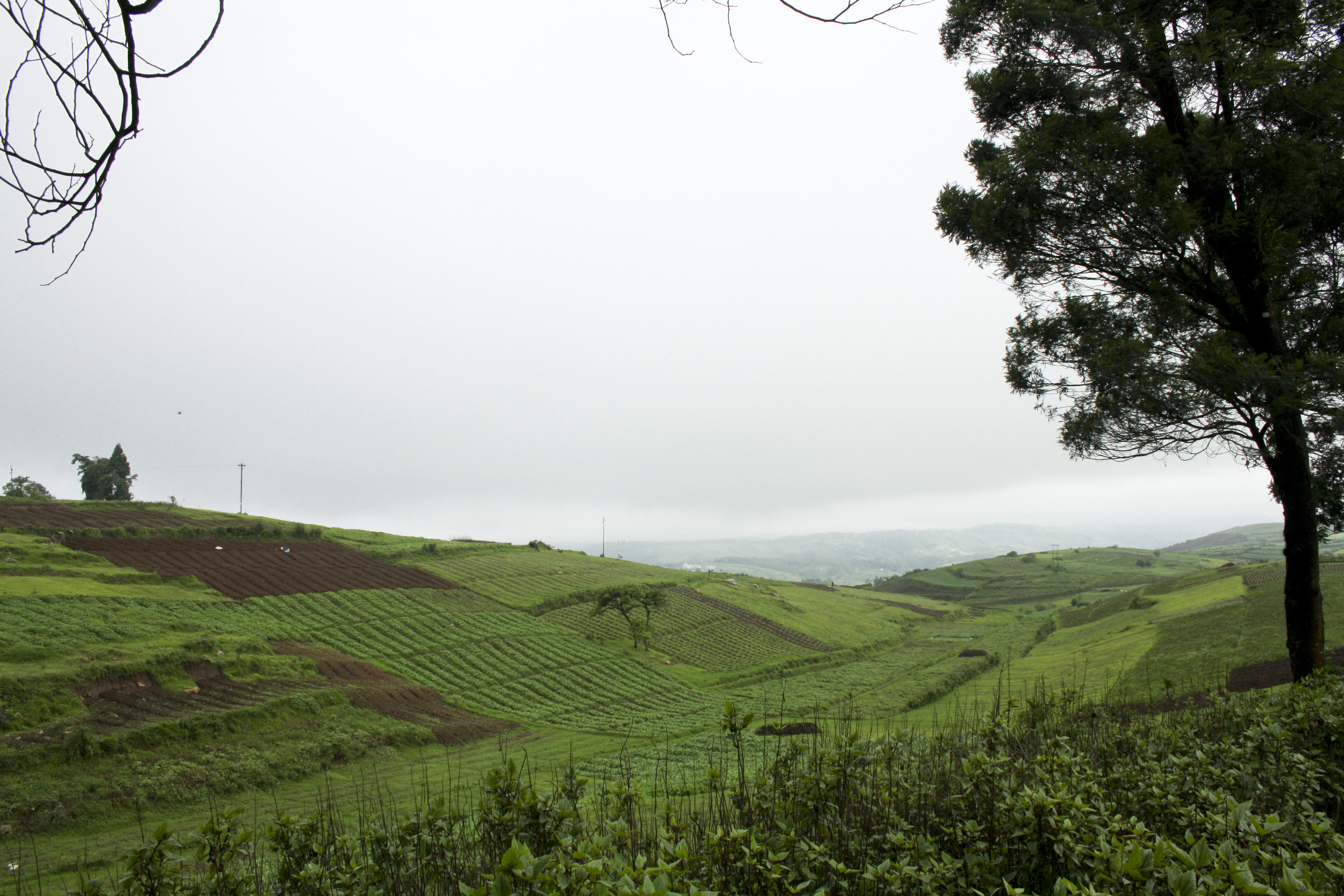
Tea Plantation in Meghalaya, on the way to Shillong

Meghalaya is basically an agricultural state with about 80% of its population depending entirely on agriculture for their livelihood. Nearly 10% of the geographical area of Meghalaya is under cultivation. Agriculture in the state is characterised by limited use of modern techniques, low yields, and low productivity. As a result, despite the vast majority of the population being engaged in agriculture, the contribution of agricultural production to the state's GDP is low, and most of the population engaged in agriculture remain poor. A portion of the cultivated area is under the traditional shifting agriculture known locally as jhum.

Meghalaya produced 230,000 tonnes of food grains in 2001. Rice is the dominant food grain crop accounting for over 80% of the food grain production in the state. Other important food grain crops are maize, wheat, and a few other cereals and pulses. Besides these, potato, ginger, turmeric, black pepper, areca nut, Bay leaf (Cinnamomum tamala), betel, short-staple cotton, jute, mesta, mustard and rapeseed etc. are some of the important cash crops. Besides the major food crops of rice and maize, the state is renowned for its horticultural crops like orange, lemon, pineapple, guava, litchi, banana, jackfruit and fruits such as plum, pear, and peach.

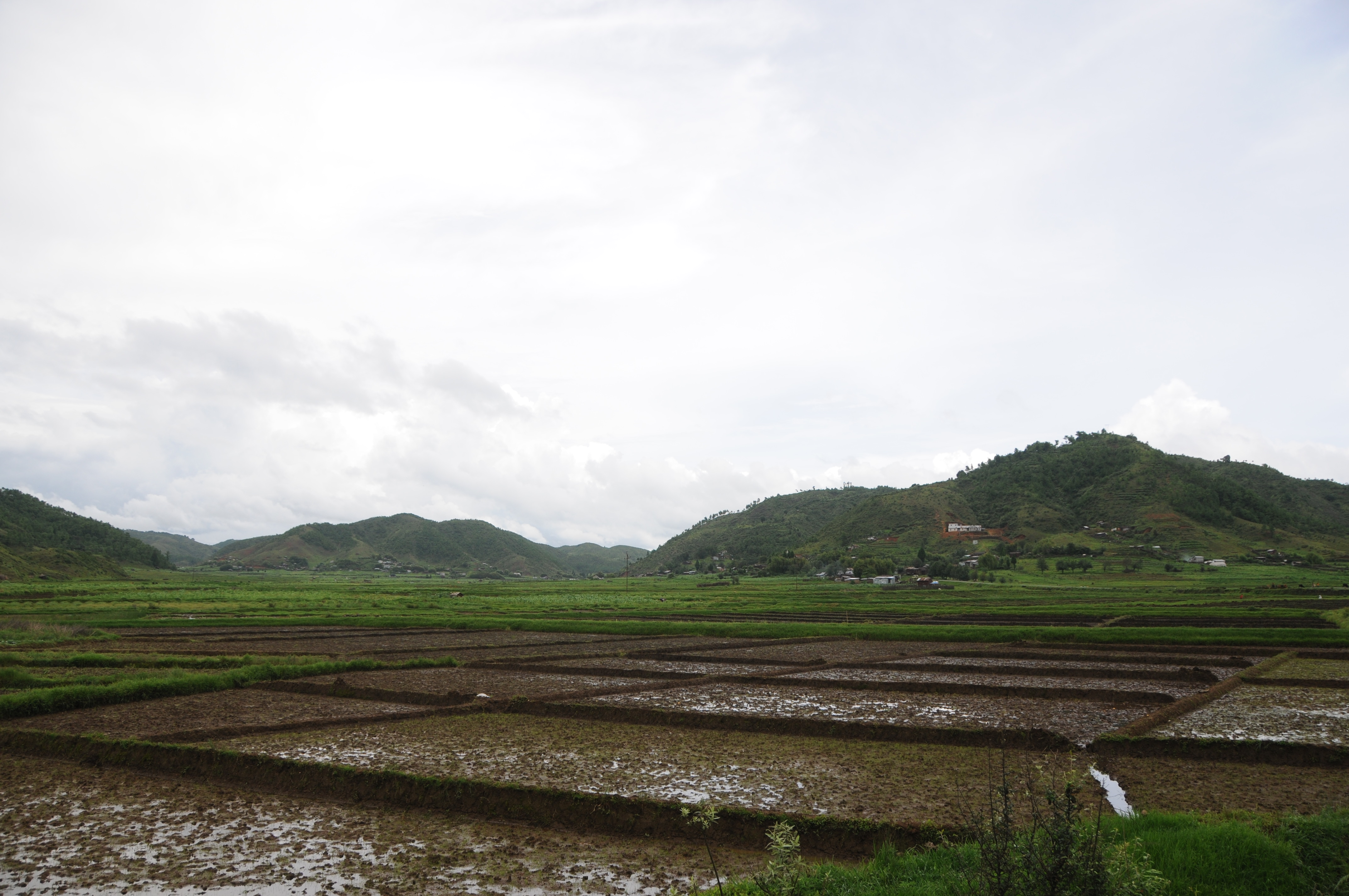
Agriculture in Kukon, Meghalaya

Grains and staples production covers about 60% of the land area dedicated to crops. With the introduction of different crops of high yielding varieties in the mid-1970s, a remarkable increase in food grain production has been made. A major breakthrough was achieved when high yielding varieties of paddy such as Masuri, Pankaj IR 8, RCPL and other improved varieties series – especially IR 36 which is suitable for Rabi season – allowing three crops to be grown every year. Another milestone was reached when Megha I and Megha II, which are cold tolerant rice varieties developed by the ICAR North East Region at Umroi near Shillong, was released in 1991–92 for the higher altitude regions where there was no high yielding rice varieties earlier. Today the state can claim that about 42% area under paddy has been covered with high yielding varieties with the average productivity of 2,300 kg/ha (2,100 lb/acre). As is the case with maize and wheat where the productivity has increased tremendously with the introduction of HYV from 534 kg/ha (476 lb/acre) during 1971–72 to 1,218 kg/ha (1,087 lb/acre) of maize and from 611 kg/ha (545 lb/acre) to 1,490 kg/ha (1,330 lb/acre) of wheat.

Oilseeds such as rapeseed, mustard, linseed, soybean, castor, and sesame are grown on nearly 100 km^{2} (39 sq mi). Rape and mustard are the most important oilseeds accounting for well over two-thirds of the oilseed production of nearly 6.5 thousand tonnes. Fiber crops such as cotton, jute, and mesta are among the only cash crops in Meghalaya, grown in Garo Hills. These have been losing popularity in recent years as indicated by their declining yield and area under cultivation.

Climatic conditions in Meghalaya permit a large variety of horticulture crops including fruits, vegetables, flowers, spices, mushrooms, and medicinal plants. These are considered to be higher value crops, but home food security concerns have prevented farmers at large from embracing them. The important fruits grown include citrus fruits, pineapples, papayas, and bananas. In addition to this, a large variety of vegetables are grown in the state, including cauliflower, cabbages, and radishes.

Areca nut plantations can be seen all over the state, especially around the road from Guwahati to Shillong. Other plantation crops like tea, coffee and cashews have been introduced lately and are becoming common. A large variety of spices, flowers, medicinal plants and mushrooms are grown in the state.

=== Industry ===
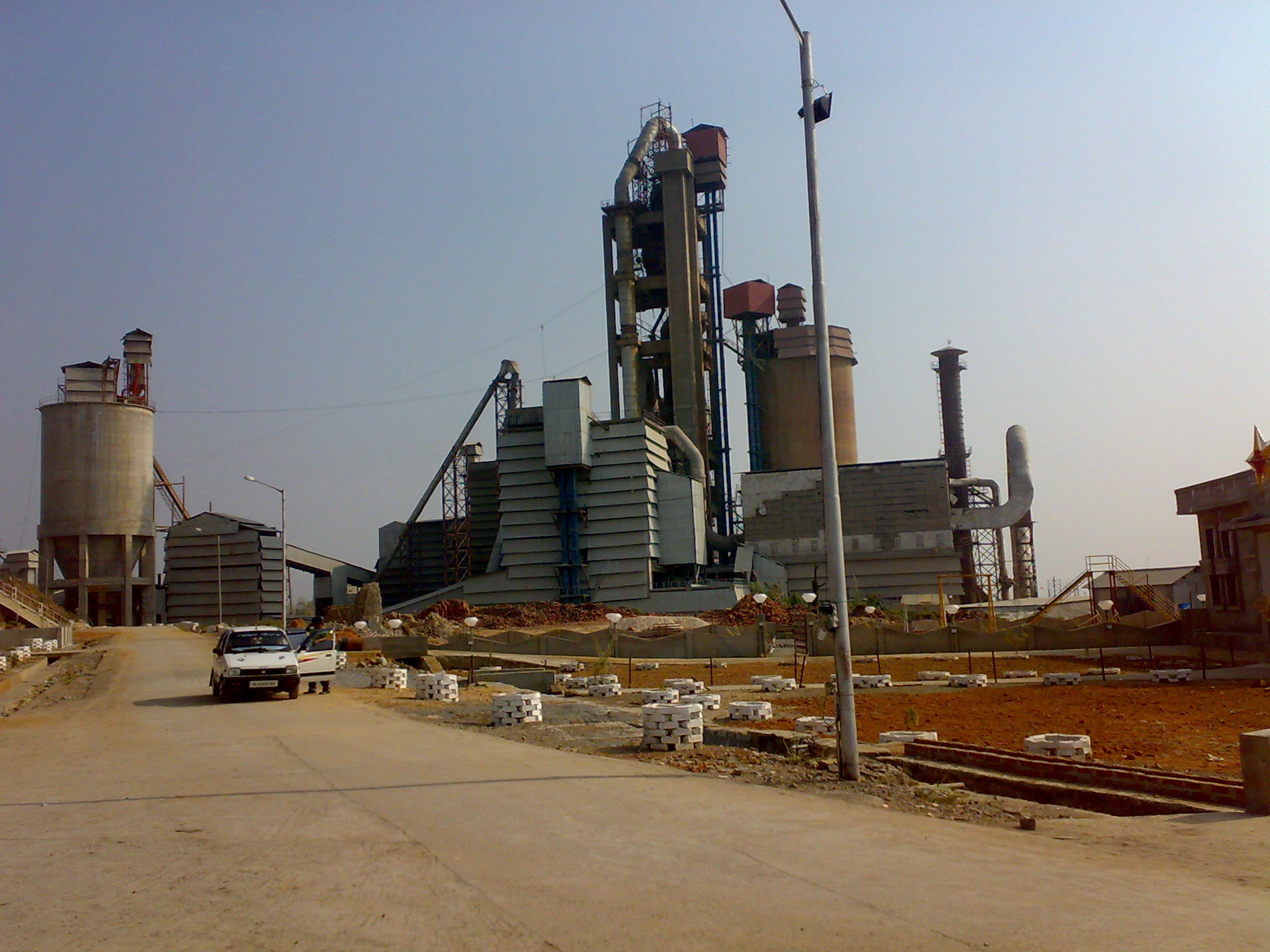
View of MCL Cement plant, Thangskai, P.O. Lumshnong, Jaintia Hills

Meghalaya has a rich base of natural resources. These include minerals such as coal, limestone, sillimanite, Kaolin and granite among others. Meghalaya has a large forest cover, rich biodiversity, and numerous water bodies. The low level of industrialisation and the relatively poor infrastructure base acts as an impediment to the exploitation of these natural resources in the interest of the state's economy. In recent years two large cement manufacturing plants with production capacity more than 900 MTD have come up in Jaintia Hills district and several more are in pipeline to use the rich deposit of very high-quality limestone available in this district.

=== Electricity infrastructure ===
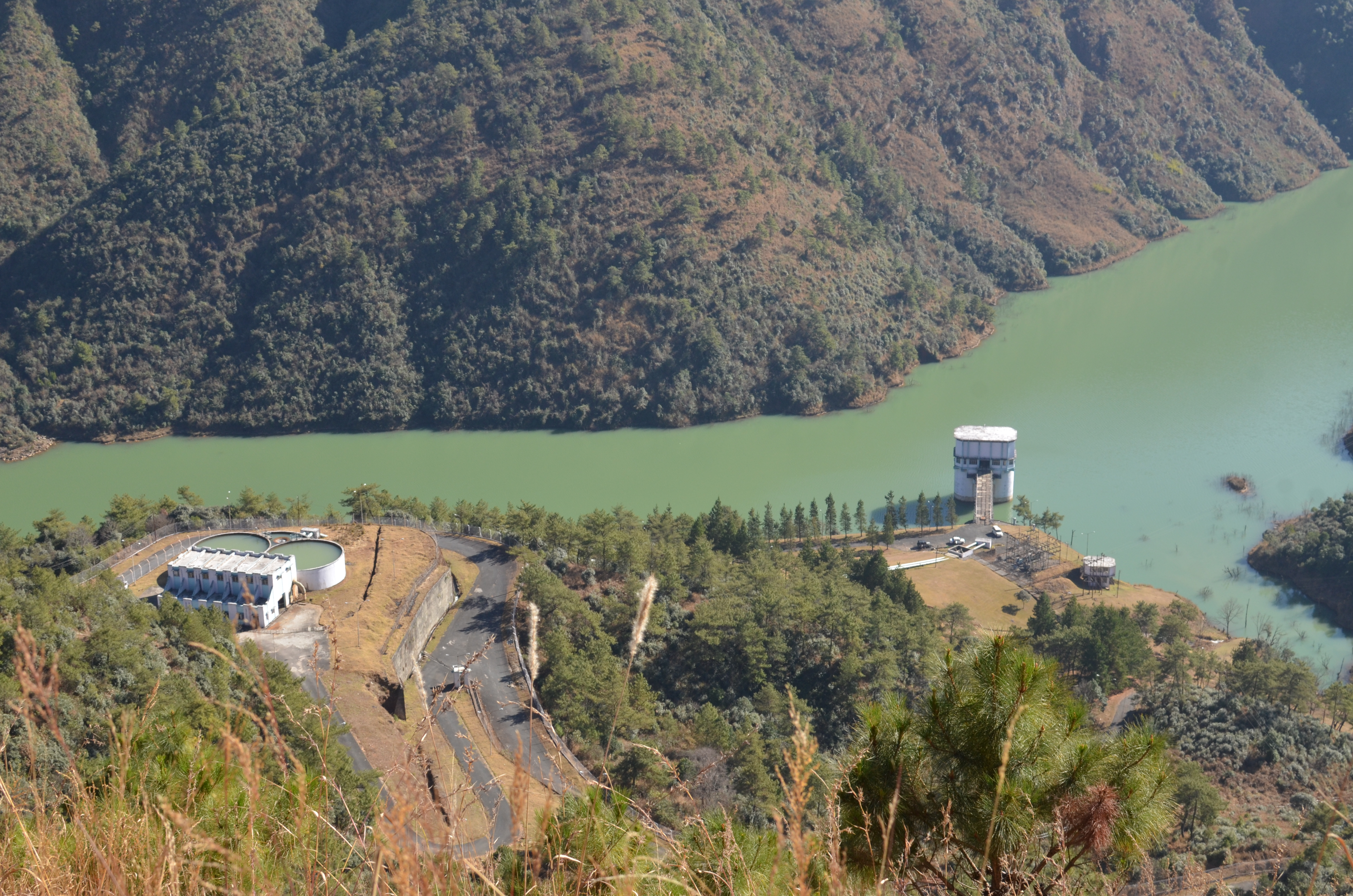
Meghalaya has abundant but undeveloped hydroelectric resources. Above is Mawphlang hydroelectric dam reservoir.

Meghalaya, with its high mountains, deep gorges, and abundant rains has a large, unused hydroelectric potential. The assessed generation capacity exceeds 3000 MW. The current installed capacity in the state is 185 MW, but the state itself consumes 610 MW. In other words, it imports electricity. The economic growth of the state suggests rising demand for electricity. The state has the potential to export net hydroelectric-generated electricity and earn income for its internal development plans. The state also has large deposits of coal, thus being a candidate for thermal power plants.

Several projects are under works. The proposed Garo Hills thermal project at Nangalbibra is expected to generate an additional 751 MW of power. There is a proposal for setting up a 250 MW thermal power plant in West Khasi Hills. The State Government aims to increase its power generation output by about 2000-2500 MW, of which 700-980 MW will be thermal based while 1400-1520 MW will be hydroelectricity. The State Government has outlined a cost-shared public-private partnership model to accelerate private sector investments in its power sector. The generation transmission, transformation and distribution of electricity is entrusted to the Meghalaya Energy Corporation Limited which was constituted under the Electricity Supply Act, 1948. At present, there are five hydel power stations and one mini hydel including Umiam Hydel Project, Umtrew Hydel Project, Myntdu-Leshka-I Hydel Project, and the Sunapani Micro Hydel (SESU) Project.

For the 12th five-year plan of India, there is a proposal to set up more hydel power projects in the state: Kynshi (450 MW), Umngi −1 (54 MW), Umiam-Umtru -V (36 MW), Ganol (25 MW), Mawphu (120 MW), Nongkolait (120 MW), Nongnaw (50 MW), Rangmaw (65 MW), Umngot (260 MW), Umduna (57 MW), Myntdu-Leshka-II (60 MW), Selim (170 MW) and Mawblei (140 MW). Of these, Jaypee Group has committed itself to building the Kynshi and Umngot projects in Khasi hills.

=== Education infrastructure ===
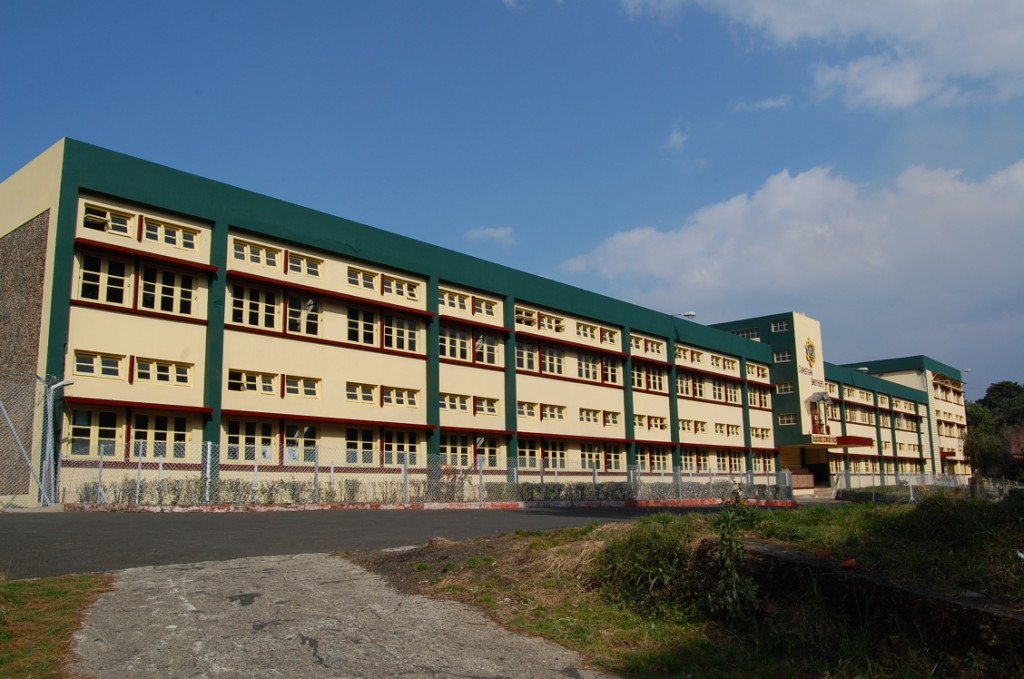
St. Edmund's School, Shillong

Meghalaya had a literacy rate of 62.56 as per the 2001 census and is the 27th most literate state in India. This increased to 75.5 in 2011. As of 2006, the state had 5851 primary schools, 1759 middle schools, and 655 higher secondary schools respectively. In 2008, 518,000 students were enrolled in its primary schools, and 232,000 in upper primary schools. The state monitors its school for quality, access, infrastructure and teachers training.

Institution for higher studies like Indian Institute of Management, the University of Technology and Management (USTM) which is in Shillong is the first Indian university to introduce cloud computing engineering as a field of study, in collaboration with IBM and the University of Petroleum and Energy Studies. IIM Shillong is one of the top ranked management institutes in the country.

=== Health infrastructure ===
The state has 13 state government dispensaries, 22 community health centres, 93 primary health centres, 408 sub-centres. There were 378 doctors, 81 pharmacists, 337 staff nurses and 77 lab technicians as of 2012. A special program has been launched by the state government for the treatment of tuberculosis, leprosy, cancer and mental diseases. Though there has been a steady decline in the death rate, improvement in life expectancy and an increase in health infrastructure, about 42.3% of the state's population is still uncovered by health care, according to the status paper prepared by the Health Department. There are numerous hospitals being set up, both private and government, some of them are Civil Hospital, Ganesh Das Hospital, K.J.P. Synod Hospital, NEIGRIHMS, North Eastern Institute of Ayurveda & Homoeopathy (NEIAH), R P Chest Hospital, Wood Land Hospital, Nazareth Hospital, Christian Hospital etc.

== Urban areas ==
- Municipal boards: Shillong, Tura, Jowai, Williamnagar, Resubelpara, Baghmara
- Cantonment board: Shillong Cantonment (Umroi)
- Town committees: Nongstoin, Nongpoh, Mairang
- Census towns: Mawlai, Madanrting, Nongthymmai, Nongmynsong, Pynthorumkhrah, Cherrapunji, Pynursla
- Minor towns: Khliehriat, Mawkyrwat, Ampati
- Areas under Shillong Urban Agglomeration: Shillong, Shillong Cantonment/Umroi, Mawlai, Madanrting, Nongthymmai, Nongmynsong, Pynthorumkhrah

=== New proposal for urban areas ===
- Municipal corporations: Shillong (including Shillong Cantonment/Umroi, Mawlai, Madanrting, Nongthymmai, Nongmynsong, Pynthorumkhrah)
- Municipal boards: Tura, Jowai, Williamnagar, Resubelpara, Baghmara, Nongstoin, Nongpoh, Mairang
- Town committees: Khliehriat, Mawkyrwat, Ampati, Cherrapunji, Pynursla

== Culture and society ==
The main tribes in Meghalaya are the Khasis, the Garos, and the Jaintias. Each tribe has its own culture, traditions, dress and language.

=== Social institutions ===
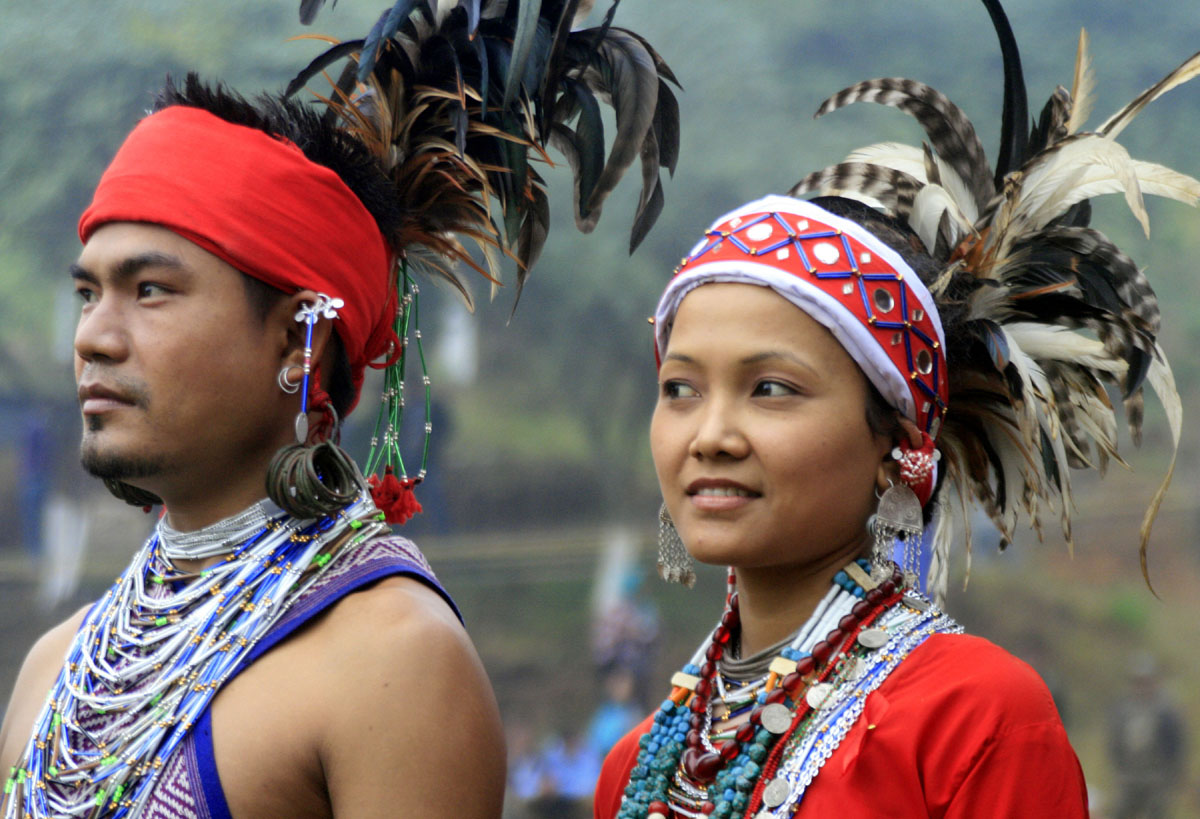
Garo couple in traditional dress.

The majority of the population and the major tribal groups in Meghalaya follow a matrilineal system where lineage and inheritance are traced through women. The youngest daughter inherits all the property and she is the caretaker of aged parents and any unmarried siblings. In some cases, such as when there is no daughter in the family or other reasons, the parents may nominate another girl such as a daughter in law as the heir of the house and all other property they may own.

The Khasi and Jaintia tribesmen follow the traditional matrilineal norm, wherein the Khun Khatduh (or the youngest daughter) inherits all the property and responsibilities for the family. The male line, particularly the mother's brother, may indirectly control the ancestral property since he may be involved in important decisions relating to property including its sale and disposal. In case a family has no daughters, the Khasi and Jaintia (also called Syntengs) have the custom of ia rap iing, where the family adopts a girl from another family, perform religious ceremonies with the community, and she then becomes ka trai iing (head of the house).

In the Garo lineage system, the youngest daughter inherits the family property by default, unless another daughter is so named by the parents. She then becomes designated as nokna meaning 'for the house or home'. If there are no daughters, a chosen daughter-in-law (bohari) or an adopted child (deragata) comes to stay in the house and inherit the property. This adopted girl child is then the head of the house.

Meghalaya has one of the world's last surviving matrilineal cultures.

=== Civil society ===
Meghalaya's civil society considers the people of the state as a collective community that exists through civil society organisations (CSOs), and serves the general interests of the public. These organisations include a wide spectrum of non-government organisations (NGOs), other community associations, and foundations. The current status of Meghalaya's civil society and the effectiveness of the many programs is debated by scholars.

There are currently over 181 NGOs within Meghalaya that vary from charities to volunteer services and social empowerment groups. Most civil society organisations are also ethnically affiliated as the interests of different groups are championed between each organisation. This in turn causes them to become representatives of ethnic communities around the state since the same individuals from such communities also participate in corresponding organisations that protect their ethnic interests. Three student organisations that represent the major ethnic groups of Meghalaya: Khasi Students' Union (KSU), Jantia Students' Union (JSU), and Garo Students' Union (GSU) embody this example into their overall functions as CSOs by applying pressure to local government in order to ensure that certain rights are being met.

There also exists many forms of community associations that revolve around the idea of community building. This includes examples such as sports, religious, educational, and other clubs that aim to establish individuals into different social circles based on their interests.

Philanthropic foundations in Meghalaya's civil society strive for the overall well-being of its citizens. The Public Health Foundation of India (PHFI) has recently partnered with the government of Meghalaya to improve public health in many rural parts of the state by first strengthening the abilities of non-government organisations to perform such services.

Scholars are divided on the effectiveness Meghalaya's civil society. Some argue for its important role in state development through CSOs, while others point out that their impact is not only limited from above by the central government and its military, but also from below by insurgent groups.

Concerns over national security, such as the unification of neighbouring hostile countries and local insurgent groups for a possible attack on the Indian state, has served as the longstanding point of emphasis on how the Indian Central Government operates in the Northeast. Different administrative programs have been created to establish peace and stability in this region through economic development. The Armed Forces Special Powers Act (AFSPA) that was passed in 1958 by the Indian Government granted the Indian Army exclusive powers to maintain order in this area. Many insurgent organisations were also developed alongside cultural and political movements, making it very difficult to distinguish them from what constitutes a civil society. These two factors have combined to enable CSOs to be easily deemed as insurgencies and grouped with other insurgent organisations that were banned by the government, thus restricting Meghalaya's civil society as a whole.

=== Traditional political institutions ===
All the three major ethnic tribal groups, namely, the Khasis, Jaintias and the Garos also have their own traditional political institutions that have existed for hundreds of years. These political institutions were fairly well developed and functioned at various tiers, such as the village level, clan level, and state level.

In the traditional political system of the Khasis, each clan has its own council known as the Dorbar Kur which is presided over by the clan headman. The council or the Dorbar managed the internal affairs of the clan. Similarly, every village has a local assembly known as the Dorbar Shnong, i.e. village Durbar or council, which is presided over by the village headman. The inter-village issues were dealt with through a political unit comprising adjacent Khasi Villages. The local political units are known as the raids, under by the supreme political authority is known as the Syiemship. The Syiemship is the congregation of several raids and is headed an elected chief known as the Syiem or Siem (the king). The Siem rules the Khasi state through an elected State Assembly, known as the Durbar Hima. The Siem also has his mantris (ministers) whose counsel he would use in exercising executive responsibilities. Taxes were called pynsuk, and tolls were called khrong, the latter being the primary source of state income. In the early 20th century, Raja Dakhor Singh was the Siem of Khymir.

Meghalaya festival	Local calendar month	Vedic calendar month	Gregorian calendar month
Den'bilsia	Polgin	Phalgun	February
A'siroka	Chuet	Chaitra	March
A' galmaka	Pasak	Vaisakha	April
Miamua	Asal	Asharha	June
Rongchugala	Bado	Bhadra	August
Ahaia	Asin	Ashwin	September
Wangala	Gate	Kartika	October
Christmas	Posi	Pausha	December

The Jaintias also have a three-tier political system somewhat similar to the Khasis, including the Raids and the Syiem. The raids are headed by Dolois, who are responsible for performing the executive and ceremonial functions at the Raid level. At the lowest level are the village headmen. Each administrative tier has its own elected councils or durbars.

In the traditional political system of the Garos, a group of Garo villages form the A·king. The A·king functions under the supervision of the Nokmas, which is perhaps the only political and administrative authority in the political institution of the Garos. The Nokma performs both judicial and legislative functions. The Nokmas also congregates to address inter-A·king issues. There are no well-organised councils or durbars among the Garos.

=== Festivals ===
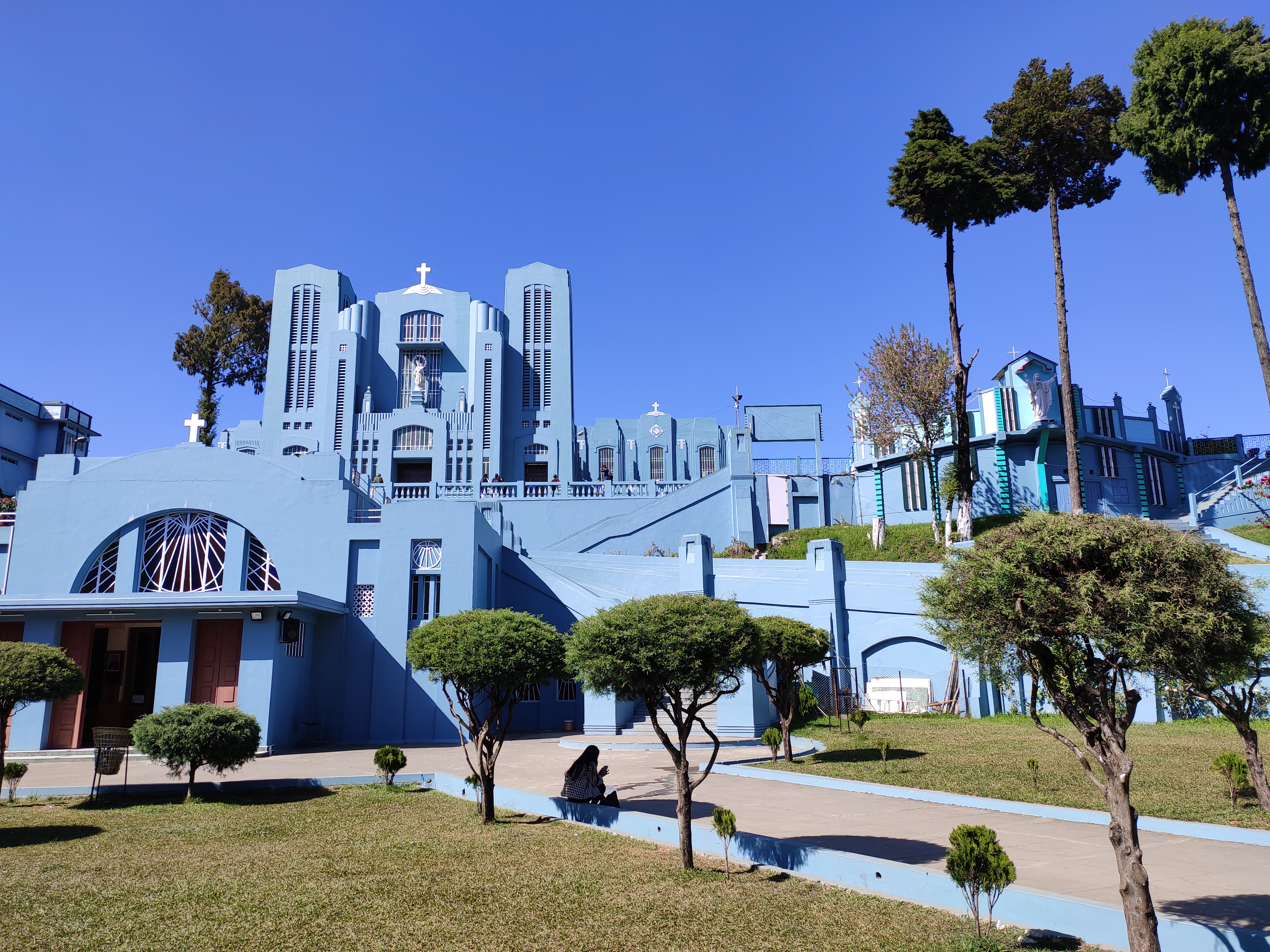
Mary Help of Christians Cathedral, Shillong

Christmas

Being a Christian majority state, Christmas is a major festival of Meghalaya, celebrated in almost all of the parts of the state by native Christian Tribes. Shillong and Cherrapunji are best destination for tourists who want to see and celebrate Christmas.

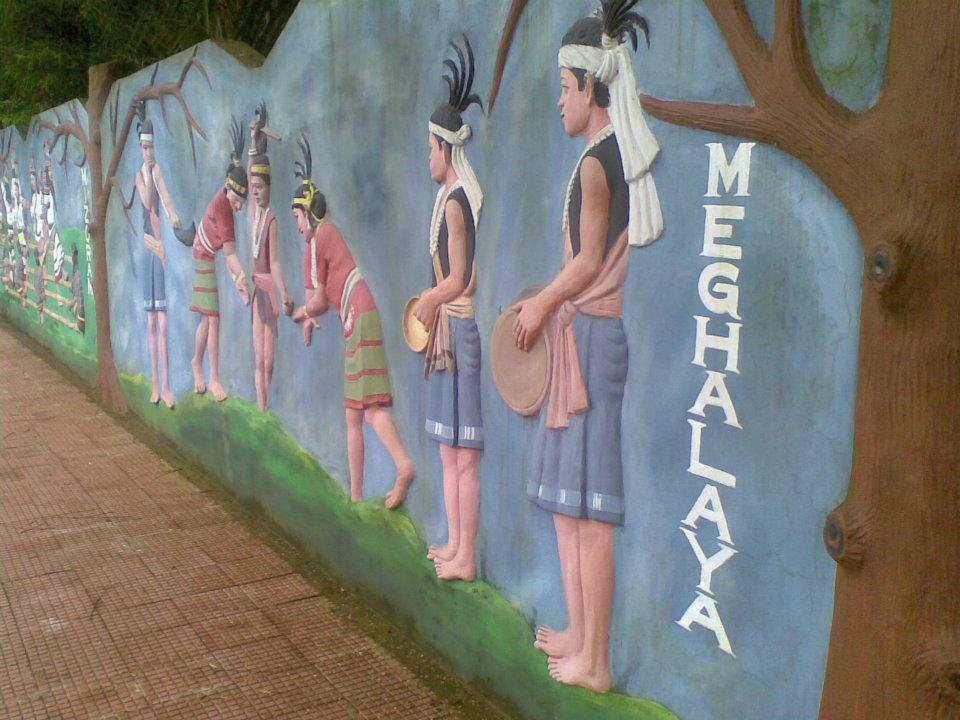
Dance of Meghalaya

Khasis

Dance is central to the culture of Khasi life, and a part of the rites of passage. Dances are performed in Shnong (village), a Raid (group of villages), and a Hima (conglomeration of Raids). Some festivals includes Ka Shad Suk Mynsiem, Ka Pom-Blang Nongkrem, Ka-Shad Shyngwiang-Thangiap, Ka-Shad-Kynjoh Khaskain, Ka Bam Khana Shnong, Umsan Nongkharai, Shad Beh Sier.

Jaintias

Festivals of the Jaintia Hills, like others, is integral to the culture of people of Jaintia Hills. It celebrates nature, balance and solidarity among its people. Festivals of Jaintias includes Behdienkhlam, Laho Dance, Sowing Ritual Ceremony.

Garos

For Garos, festivals sustain their cultural heritage. They were often dedicated to religious events, nature and seasons as well as community events such as stages of jhum cultivation. The main festivals of Garos are Den Bilsia, Wangala, Rongchu gala, Mi Amua, Mangona, Grengdik BaA, Jamang Sia, Ja Megapa, Sa Sat Ra Chaka, Ajeaor Ahaoea, Dore Rata Dance, Chambil Mesara, Do'KruSua, Saram Cha'A, A Se Mania or Tata.

Hajongs

Hajongs celebrate traditional festivals and Hindu festivals. The entire plain belt of Garo Hills is inhabited by the Hajongs, they are an agrarian tribe. Major traditional festivals include Pusne', Biswe', Kati Gasa, Bastu Puje' and Chor Maga.

Biates

The Biates had many kinds of festivals, including Nûlding Kût, Pamchar Kût, Lebang Kût and Favang Kût, for different occasions. They no longer practise or observe most, except Nûlding Kût ("renewal of life") every January, with singing, dancing and traditional games. A priest (thiampu) prays to Chung Pathian to bless Biates in every sphere of life.

=== Spirituality ===
In southern Meghalaya, located in Mawsynram, is the Mawjymbuin cave. Here a massive stalagmite has been shaped by nature into a Shivalinga. According to legend, from the 13th century, this Shivalinga (called Hatakeswarat) has existed in the Jaintia Hills under the reign of Ranee Singa. Tens of thousands of the Jaintia tribe members participate over the Hindu festival of Shivratri (Night of Lord Shiva) every year.

=== Living root bridges ===
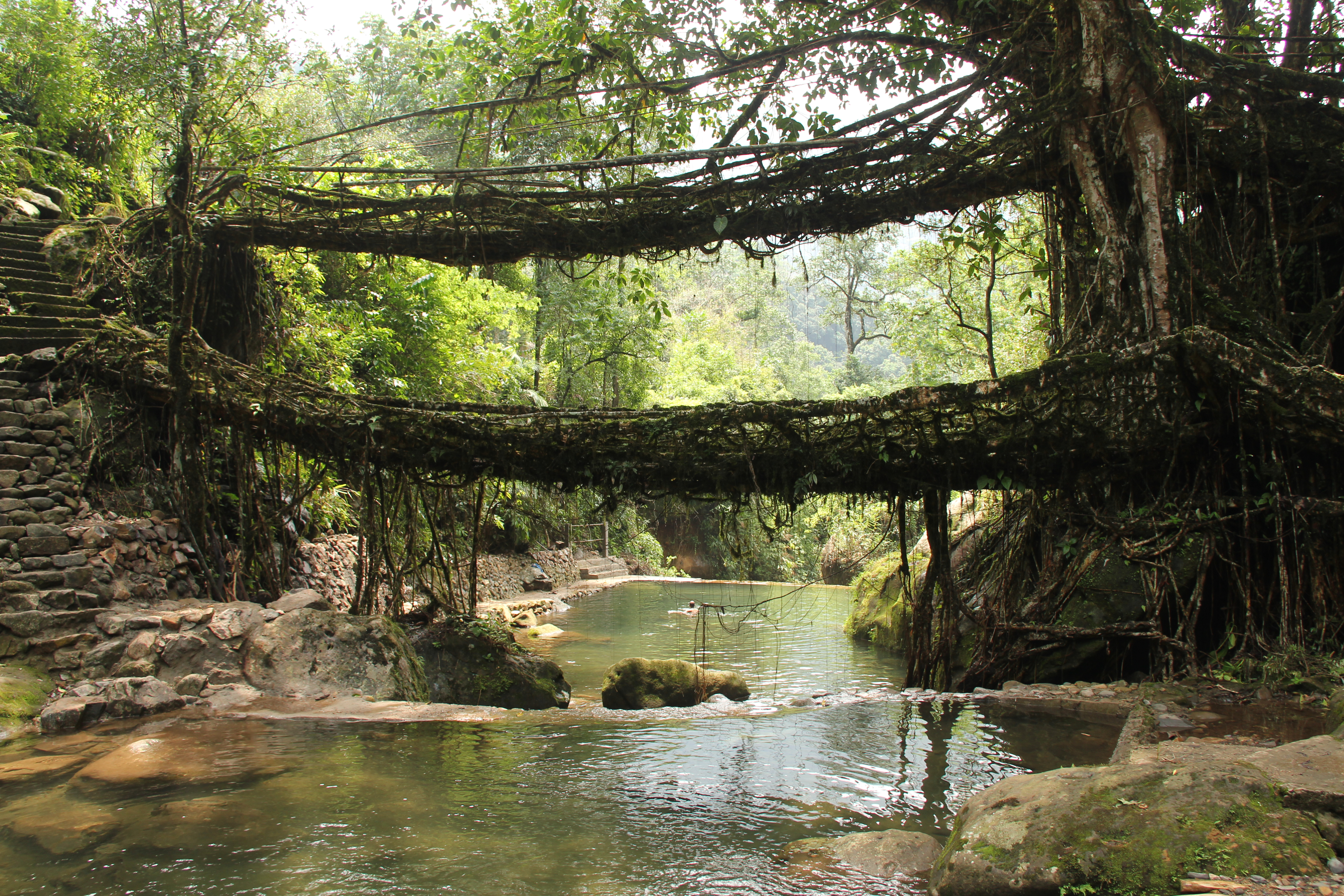
Double-Decker Living root bridge, Nongriat village.

The practice of creating living root bridges can be found in Meghalaya. Here, functional, living, architecture is created by slowly training the aerial roots of the Ficus elastica (rubber tree). Examples of these structures can be found as far west as the valley east of Mawsynram, and as far east as the East Jaintia Hills District, meaning that they are made by both Khasis and Jaintias. Large numbers of these man-made living structures exist in the mountainous terrain along the southern border of the Shillong Plateau, though as a cultural practice they are fading, with many individual examples having disappeared recently, either falling in landslides or floods or being replaced with more standard steel bridges.

== Transport ==
The partition of the country in 1947 created severe infrastructural constraints for the Northeastern region, with merely 2% of the perimeter of the region adjoining the rest of the country. A narrow strip of land often called the Siliguri Corridor or the Chicken's Neck, connects the region with the state of West Bengal. Meghalaya is a landlocked state with many small settlements in remote areas. The road is the only means of transport. While the capital Shillong is relatively well connected, road connectivity in most other parts is relatively poor. A significant portion of the roads in the state is still unpaved. Most of the arrivals into the Meghalaya take place through Guwahati in neighbouring Assam, which is nearly 103 km away. Assam has a major railhead as well as an airport with regular train and air services to the rest of the country.

When Meghalaya was carved out of Assam as an autonomous state in 1972, it inherited a total road length of 2786.68 km including 174 km of National Highways with road density of 12.42 km per 100 square kilometre. By 2004, total road length has reached up to 9,350 km out of which 5,857 km were surfaced. The road density had increased to 41.69 km per 100 square kilometre by March 2011. Meghalaya is far below the national average of 75 km per 100 km^{2}. To provide better services to the people of the state, the Meghalaya Public Works Department is taking steps for improvement and up-gradation of the existing roads and bridges in phased manner.

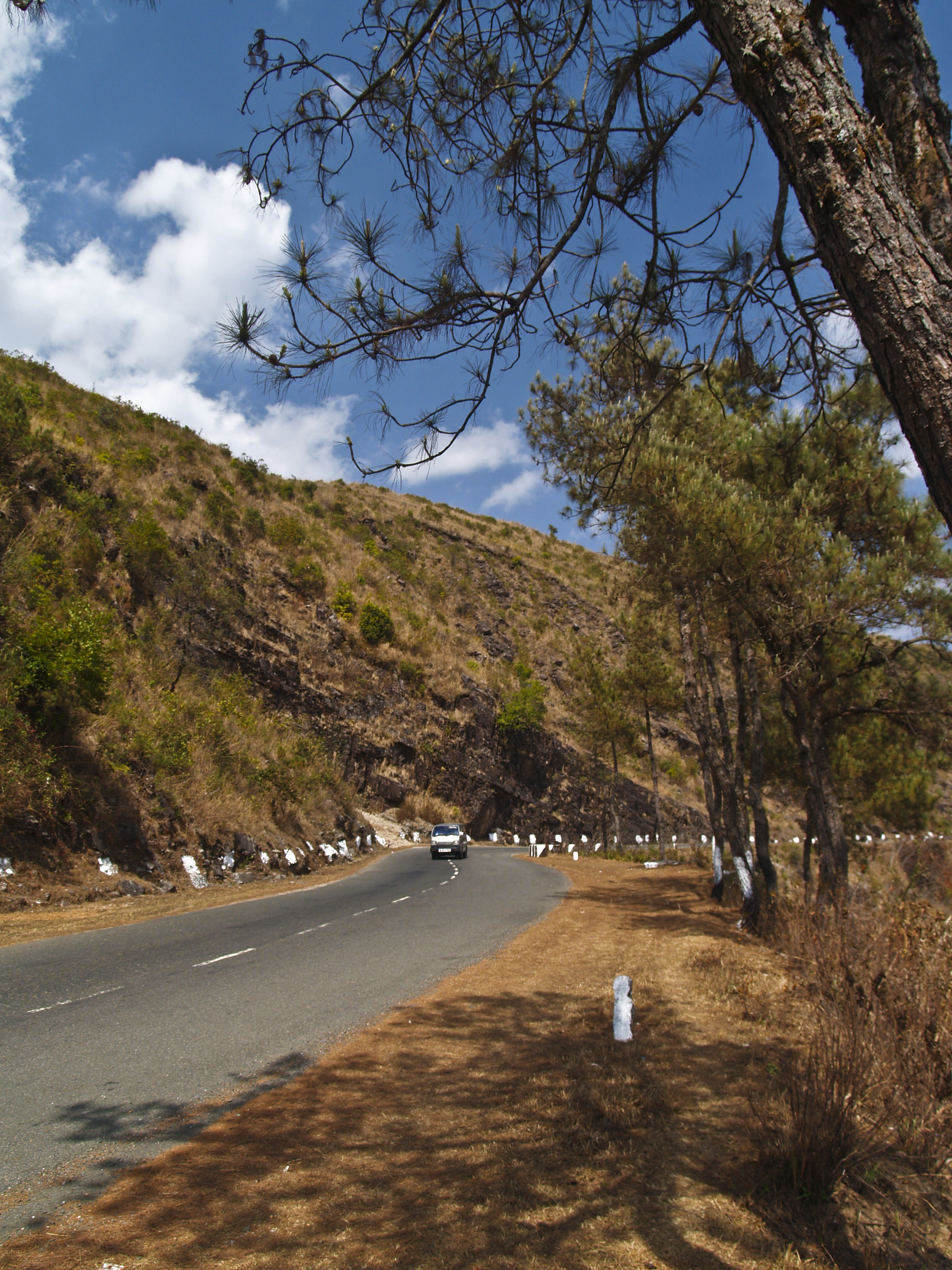
State Highway 5 near Cherrapunji, Meghalaya

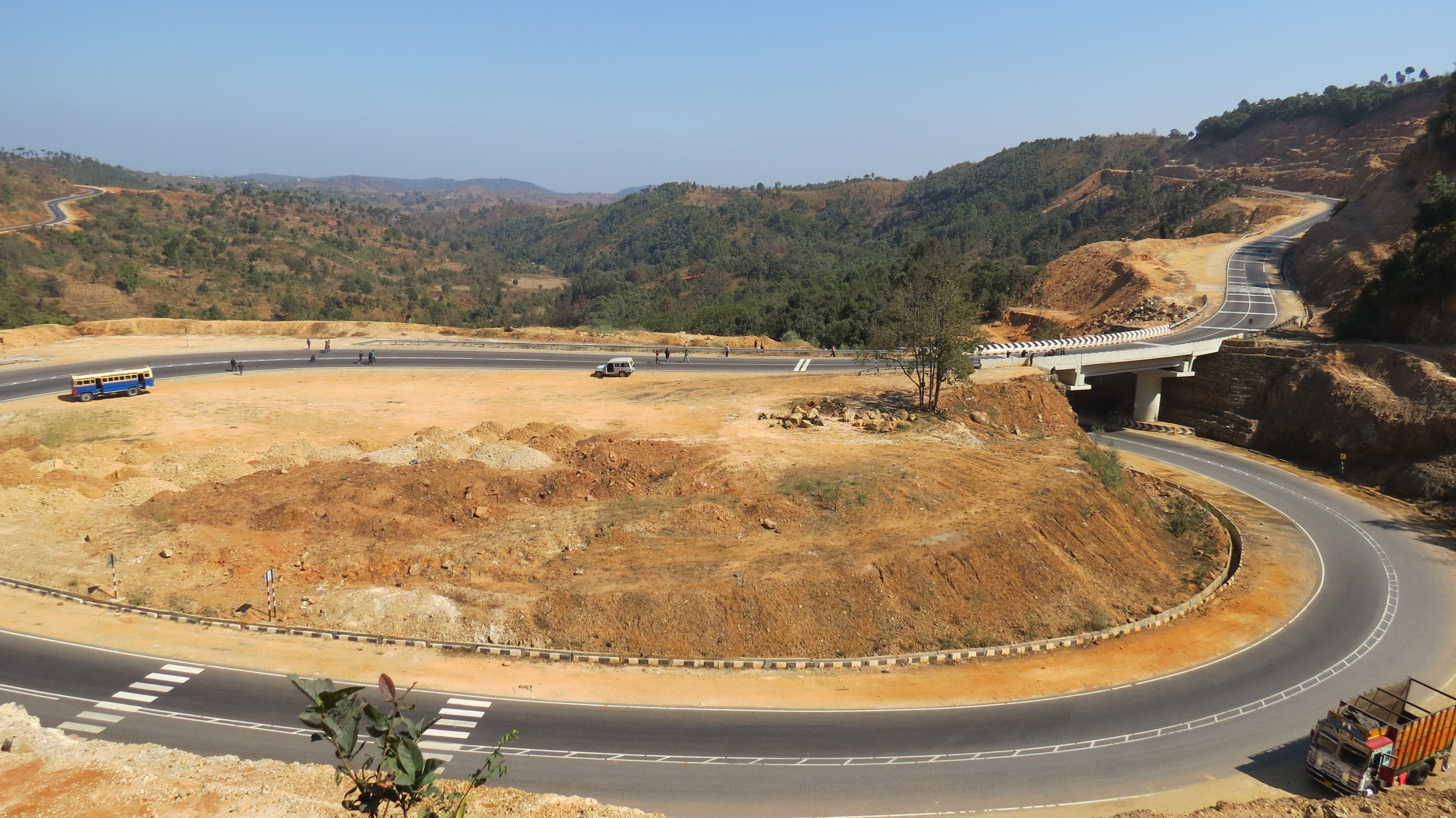
Shillong Bypass road

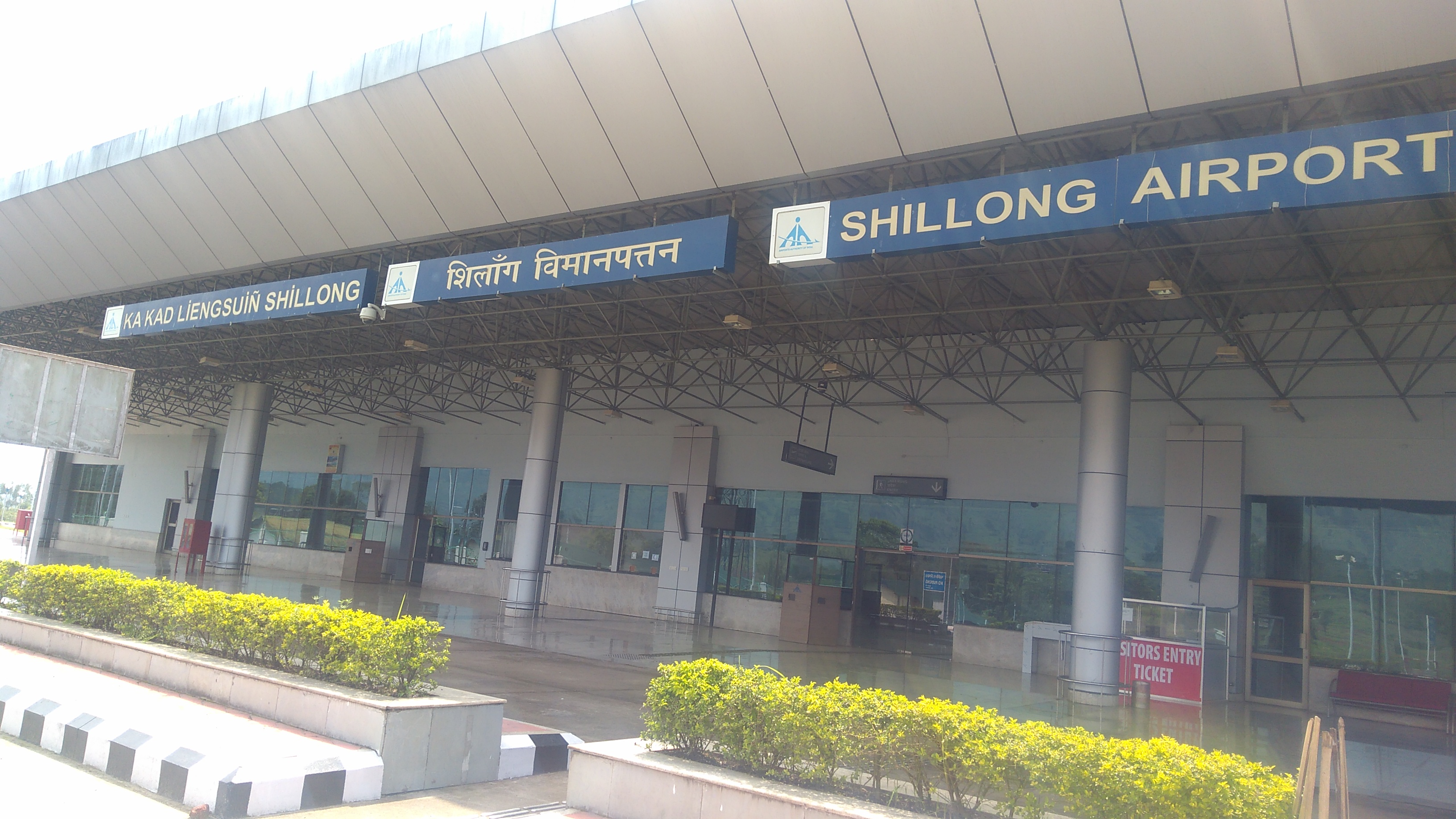
Shillong Airport

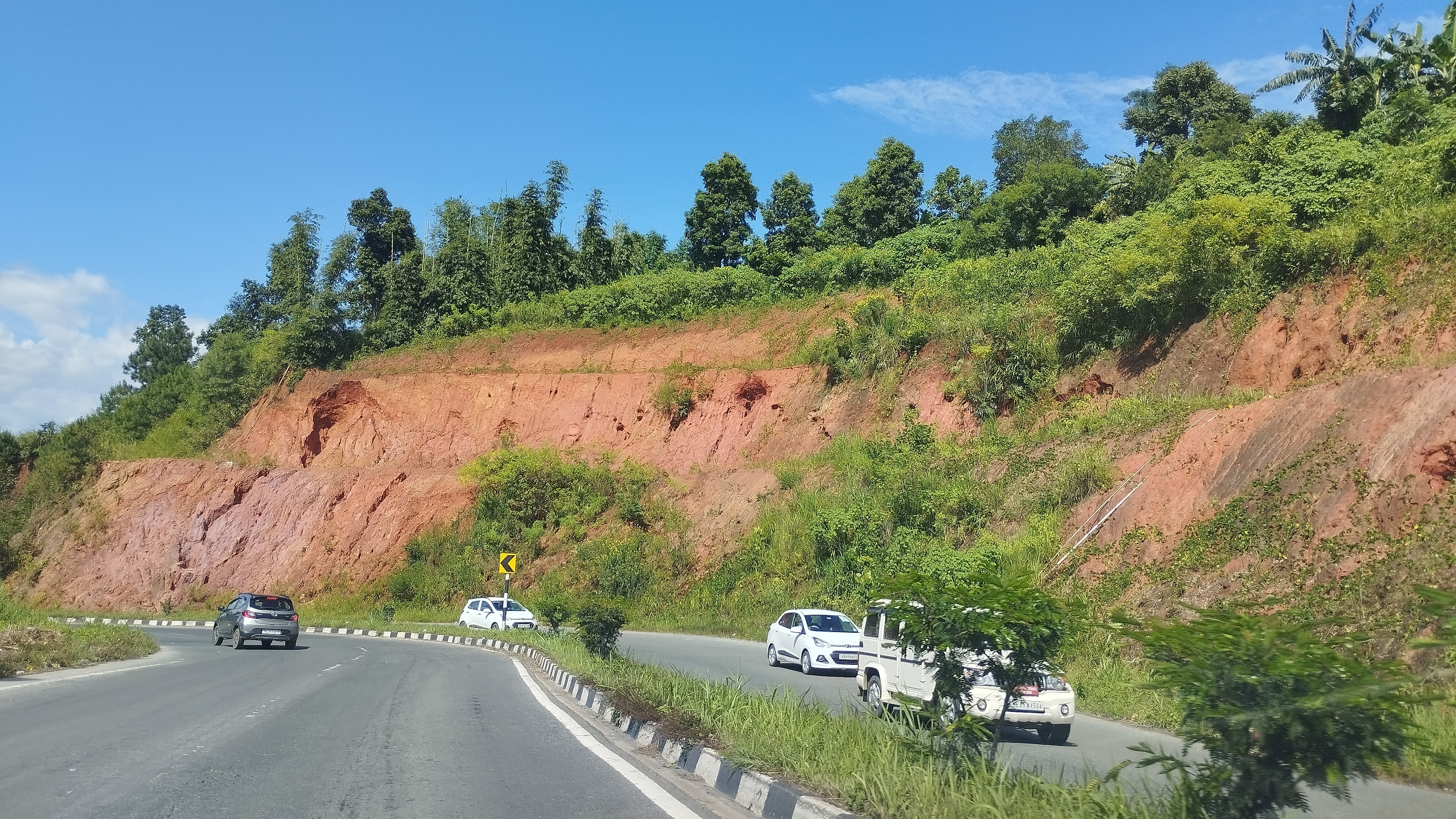
National Highway 6

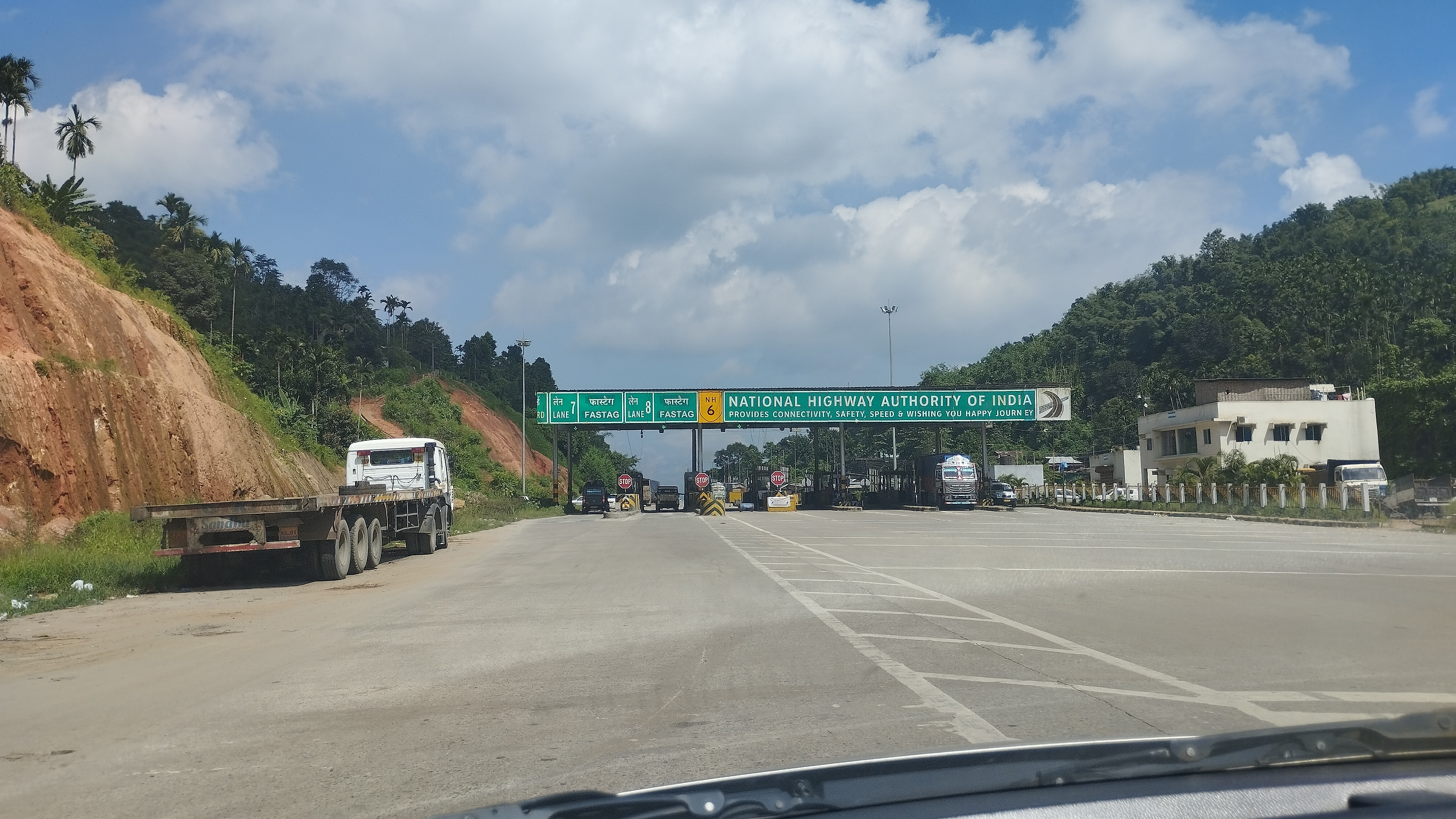
National Highway 6 Toll Plaza

=== Road network ===
Meghalaya has a road network of around 7,633 km, out of which 3,691 km is black-topped and the remaining 3942 km is gravelled. Meghalaya is also connected to Silchar in Assam, Aizawl in Mizoram, and Agartala in Tripura through national highways. Many private buses and taxi operators carry passengers from Guwahati to Shillong. The journey takes from 3 to 4 hours. Day and night bus services are available from Shillong to all major towns of Meghalaya and also other capitals and important towns of Assam and the northeastern states.

=== Railway ===
Meghalaya has a railhead at Mendipathar and regular train service connecting Mendipathar in Meghalaya and Guwahati in Assam, has started on 30 November 2014. The Cherra Companyganj State Railways was a former mountain railway through the state. Guwahati (103 kilometres (64 mi) from Shillong) is the nearest major railway station connecting the north-east region with the rest of the country through a broad gauge track network. There is a plan for extending the rail link from Guwahati to Byrnihat (20 kilometres (12 mi) from Guwahati) within Meghalaya and further extending it up to state capital Shillong.

=== Aviation ===
State capital Shillong has an airport at Umroi 30 kilometres (19 mi) from Shillong on the Guwahati-Shillong highway. A new terminal building was built at a cost of ₹30 crore (US$3.1 million) and inaugurated in June 2011. Air India Regional operates flights to Kolkata from this airport. There is also a helicopter service connecting Shillong to Guwahati and Tura. Baljek Airport near Tura became operational in 2008. The Airports Authority of India (AAI) is developing the airport for operation of ATR 42/ATR 72 type of aircraft. Other nearby airports are in Assam, with Borjhar, Guwahati airport (IATA: GAU), about 124 kilometres (77 mi) from Shillong.

== Tourism ==
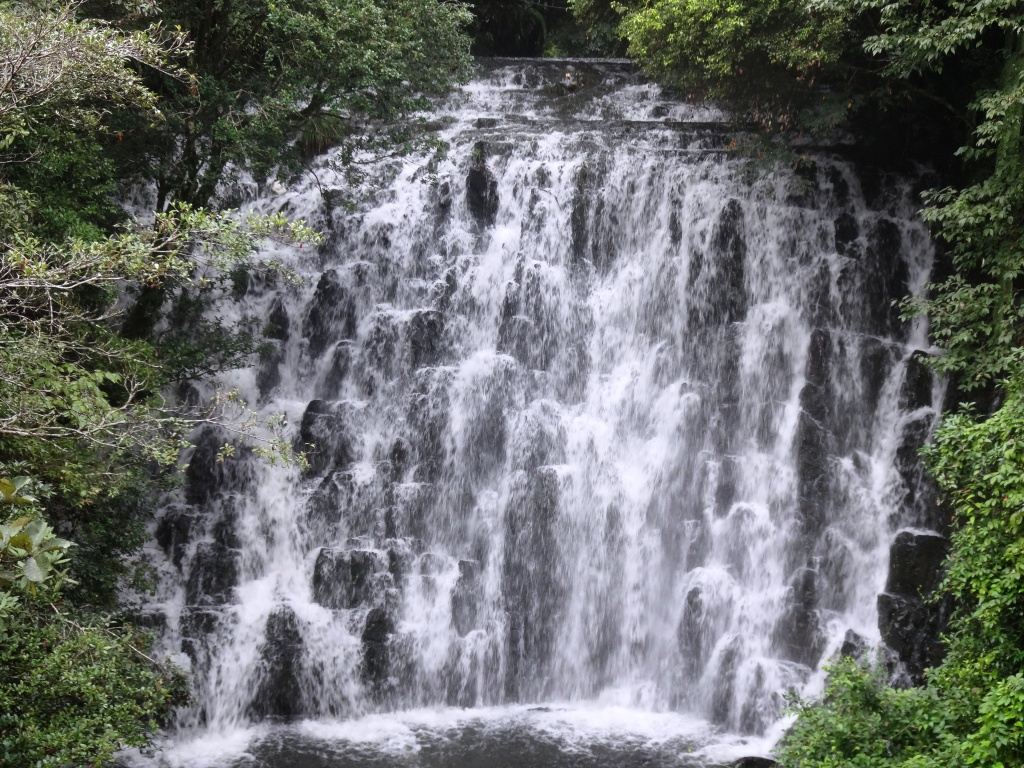
Elephant Falls

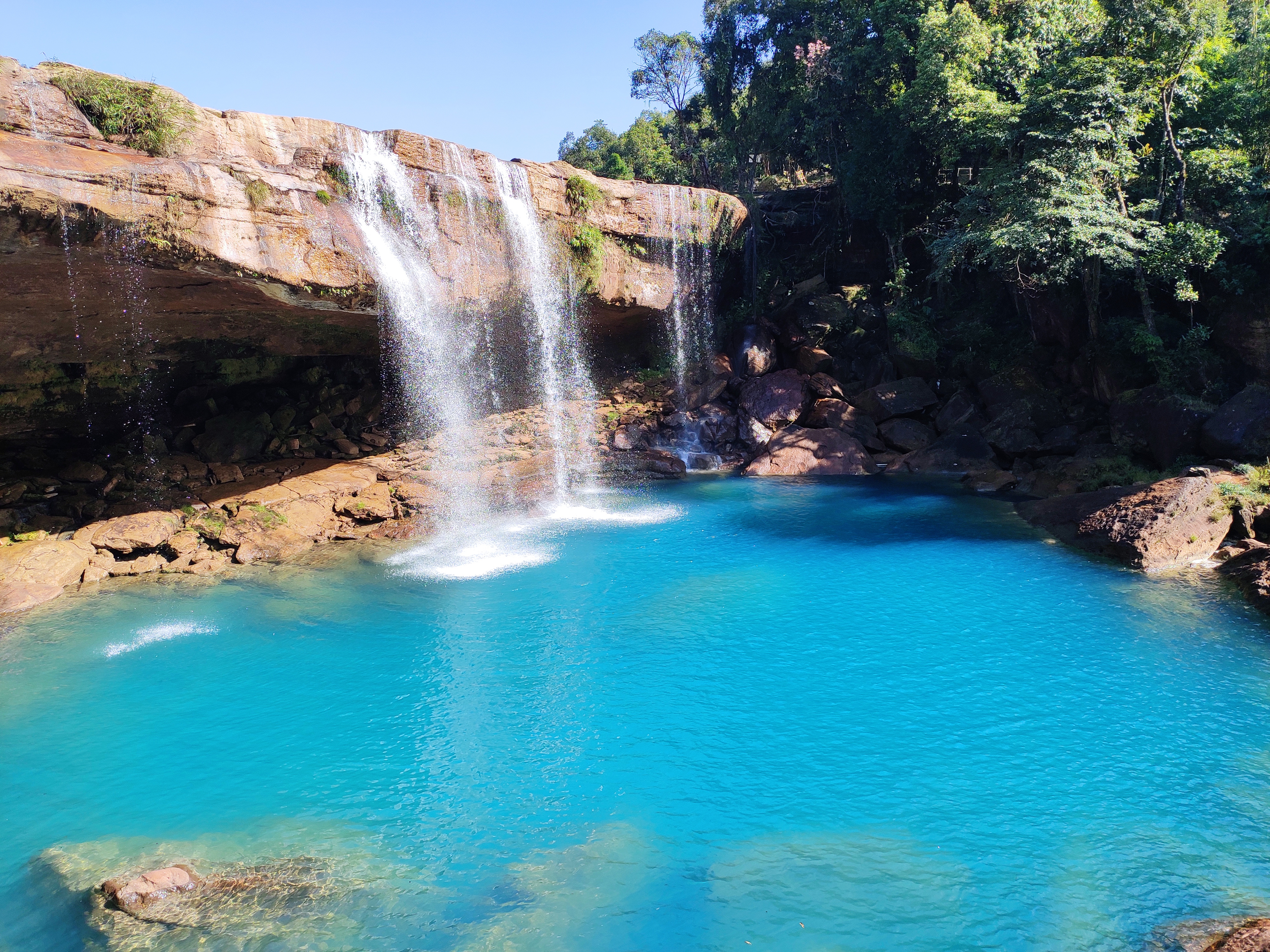
Krang Suri Waterfall

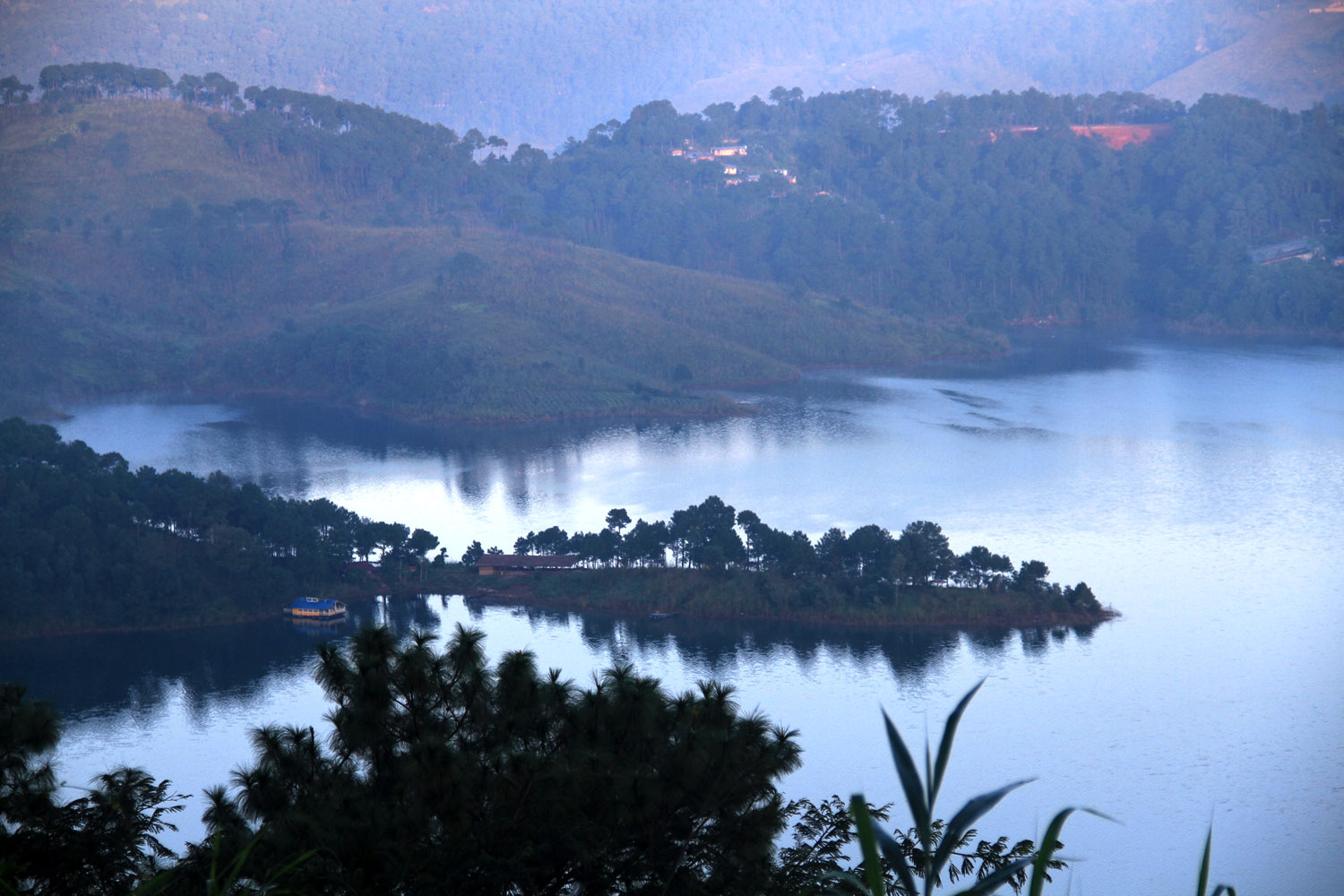
Umiam Lake, Shillong, Meghalaya, India

Until 1955, foreign tourists required special permits to enter the areas that now constitute the state of Meghalaya, which is sometimes compared to Scotland for its highlands, fog and scenery. Meghalaya has some of the thickest primary forests in the country and therefore constitutes one of the most important ecotourism circuits in India. The Meghalaya subtropical forests support a vast variety of flora and fauna. The state has two national parks and three wildlife sanctuaries.

Meghalaya also offers many adventure tourism opportunities in the form of mountaineering, rock climbing, trekking, and hiking, caving (spelunking) and water sports. The state offers several trekking routes, some of which also afford an opportunity to encounter rare animals. The Umiam Lake has a water sports complex with facilities such as rowboats, paddleboats, sailing boats, cruise-boats, water-scooters, and speedboats.

Cherrapunji is a tourist destination in north-east India. It lies to the south of the capital Shillong. A rather scenic 50-kilometre long road connects Cherrapunji with Shillong.

Living root bridges are also a tourist draw, with many examples located near Cherrapunji. The Double-Decker root bridge, along with several others, is found in the village of Nongriat, which is tourist friendly. Many other root bridges can be found nearby, in the villages of Nongthymmai, Mynteng, and Tynrong. Other areas with root bridges include Riwai village, near the tourist village of Mawlynnong, Pynursla, especially the villages of Rangthyllaing and Mawkyrnot, and the area around Dawki, in the West Jaintia Hills district, where there are many living root bridges scattered throughout the nearby villages.

Waterfalls and rivers

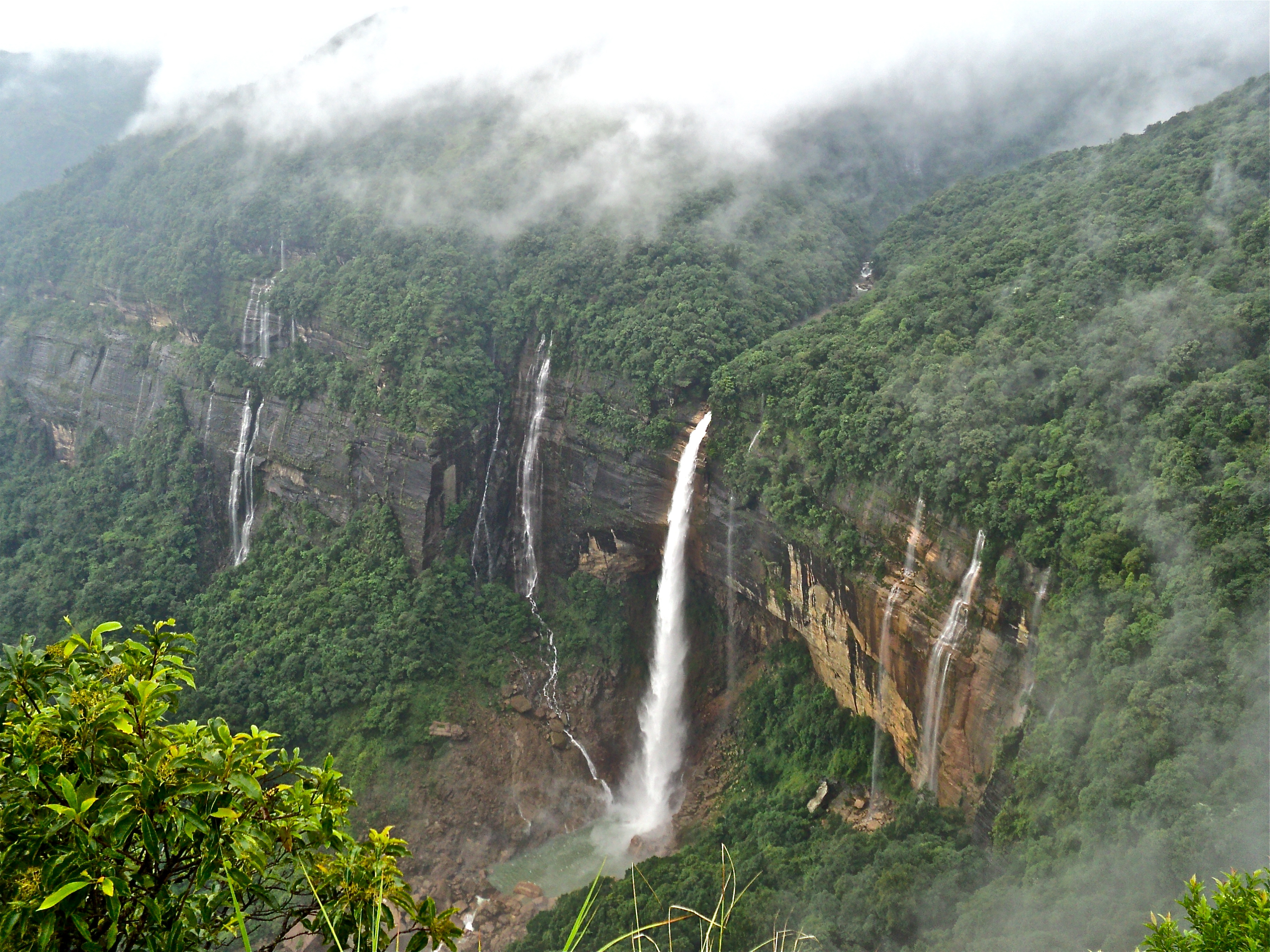
Multiple drops of Nohkalikai Falls

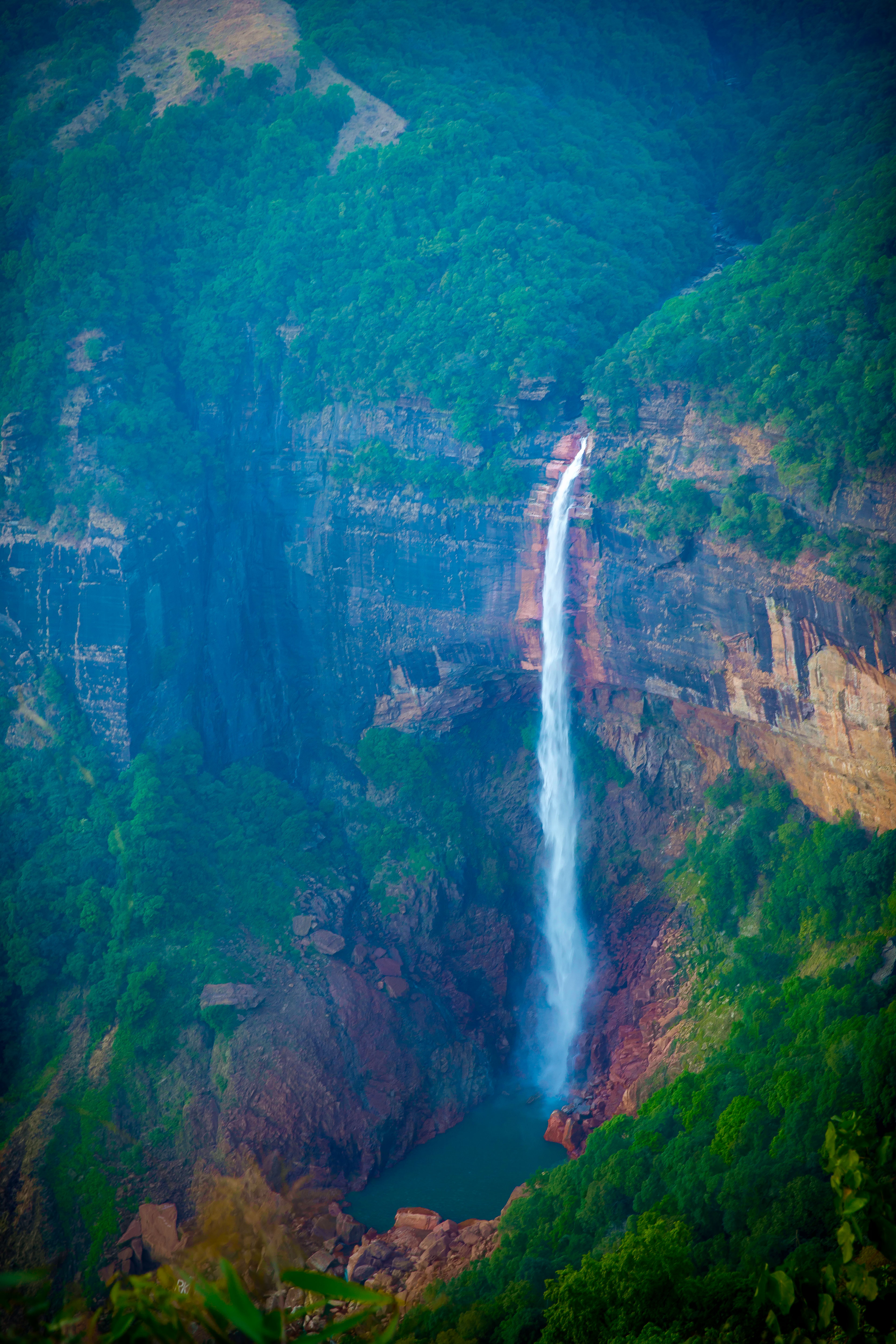
Main drop of Nohkalikai Falls

Nohkalikai Falls is one of the tallest plunge type waterfalls in India and on Earth.

The most visited waterfalls in the state include the Elephant Falls, Shadthum Falls, Weinia Falls, Bishop Falls, Nohkalikai Falls, Langshiang Falls and Sweet Falls. The hot springs at Jakrem near Mawsynram are believed to have curative and medicinal properties.

Nongkhnum Island located in the West Khasi Hills district is the biggest river island in Meghalaya and the second biggest in Asia. It is 14 kilometres from Nongstoin. The island is formed by the bifurcation of Kynshi River into the Phanliang River and the Namliang River. Adjacent to the sandy beach the Phanliang River forms a lake. The river then moves along and before reaching a deep gorge, forms a waterfall about 60 meters high called Shadthum Fall.

Sacred groves

Meghalaya is also known for its "sacred groves". They are small or large areas of forests or natural vegetation that are usually dedicated to local folk deities or tree spirits or some religious symbolism over many generations, often since ancient times. These spaces are found all over India, are protected by local communities, and in some cases, the locals would neither touch leaves or fruits or in other ways damage the forest, flora or fauna taking refuge in them. This guardianship creates a sacred area where nature and wildlife thrive. The Mawphlang sacred forest, also known as "Law Lyngdoh," is one of the most famous sacred forests in Meghalaya. It's located about 25 kilometres from Shillong. It's a scenic nature destination, and one can find the sacred Rudraksha tree here.

Rural areas

Meghalaya rural life and villages offer a glimpse in northeast mountain life. The Mawlynnong village located near the India-Bangladesh border is one such village. It has been featured by travel magazine Discover India. The village is geared for tourism and has a Living Root Bridges, hiking trails and rock formations.

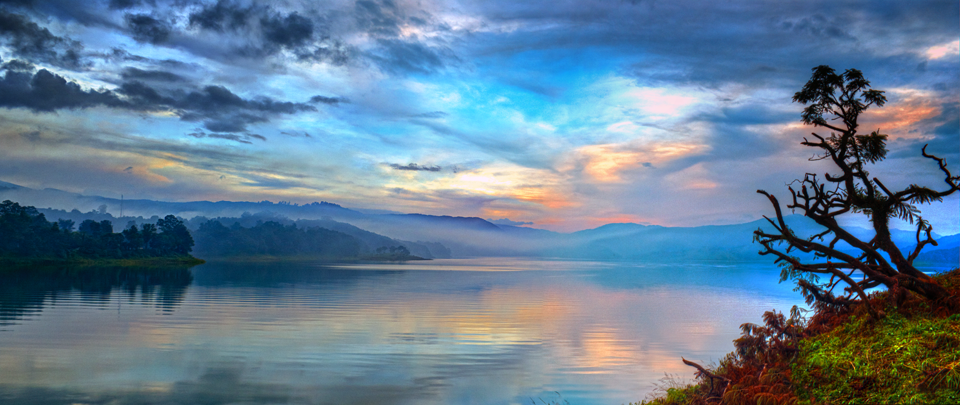
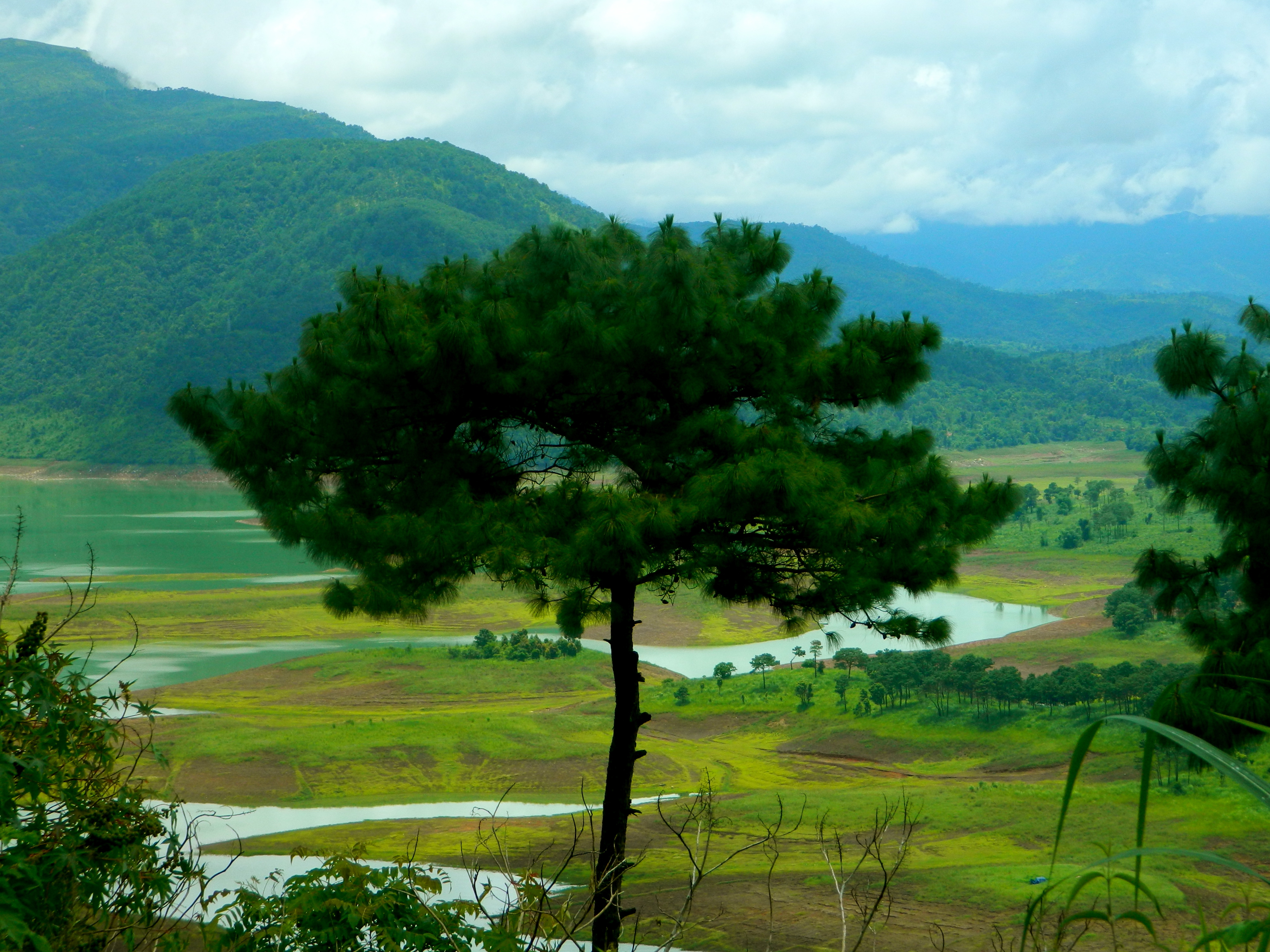
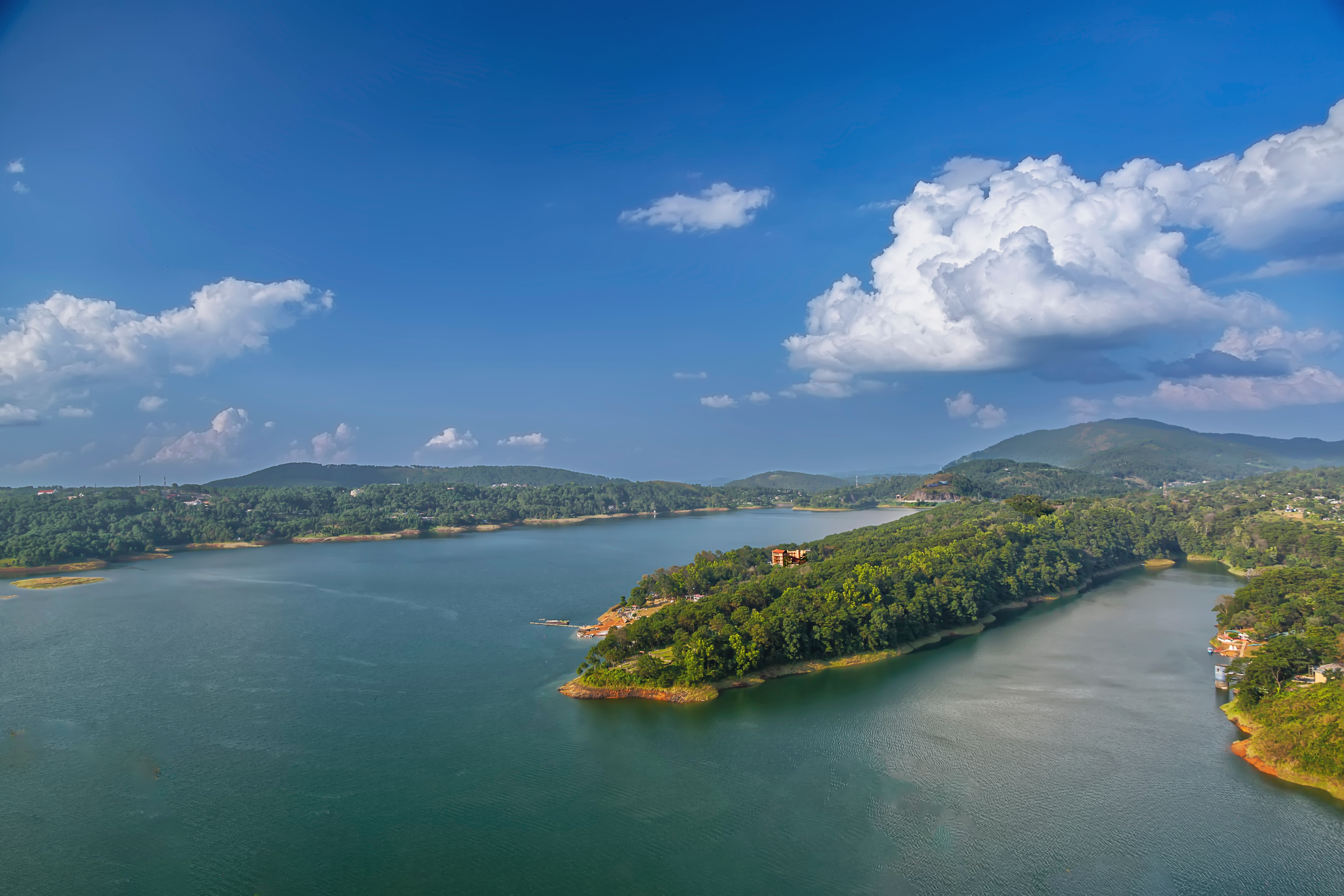
Umaim lake (top & bottom) and scenery near Shillong.

Lakes

Meghalaya also has many natural and manmade lakes. The Umiam Lake (popularly known as Bara Pani meaning Big water) on the Guwahati-Shillong road is a major tourism attraction for tourist. Meghalaya has several parks; Thangkharang Park, the Eco-park, the Botanical Garden and Lady Hydari Park to name a few. Dawki, which is located at about 96 Kilometres from Shillong is the gateway to Bangladesh and affords a scenic view of some of the tallest mountain ranges in Meghalaya and the Bangladesh borderlands.

Thadlaskein Lake also Pung Sajar Nangli is the only historical Lake of Meghalaya. It is located besides National Highway 6 by the side of a small village called Mukhla village which falls under West Jaintia Hills district Jowai. It is about 35 mile from the city of Shillong

Balpakram National Park with its pristine habitat and scenery is a major attraction. The Nokrek National Park, also in Garo Hills has its own charm with a lot of wildlife.

Caves

Meghalaya has an estimated 500 natural limestone and sandstone caves spread over the entire state including most of the longest and deepest caves in the sub-continent. Krem Liat Prah is the longest cave, and Synrang Pamiang is the deepest cave. Both are located in the Jaintia Hills. Cavers from the United Kingdom, Germany, Austria, Ireland, and the United States have been visiting Meghalaya for over a decade exploring these caves. Few have been developed or promoted adequately as major tourist destinations.

Living root bridges

Meghalaya is famous for its living root bridges, a kind of suspension bridge made over rivers using intertwined roots of Ficus elastica trees planted on opposite banks of the river or hill slopes. These bridges can be seen around Cherrapunji, Nongtalang, Kudeng Rim and Kudeng Thymmai villages (War Jaintia). A double-decker bridge exists in Nongriat village.

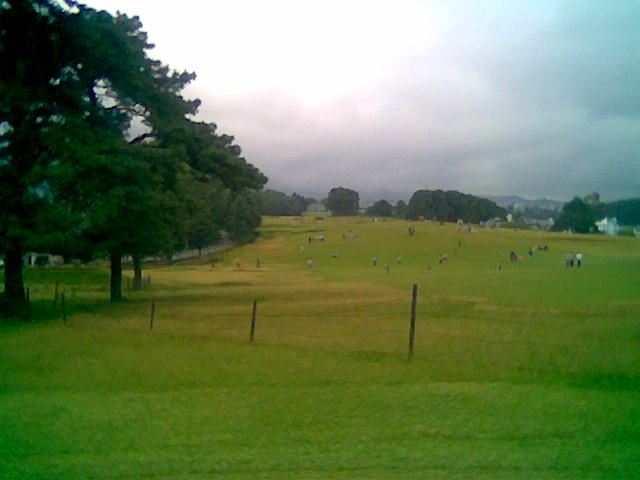
Shillong Golf Course, one of the oldest golf courses of India

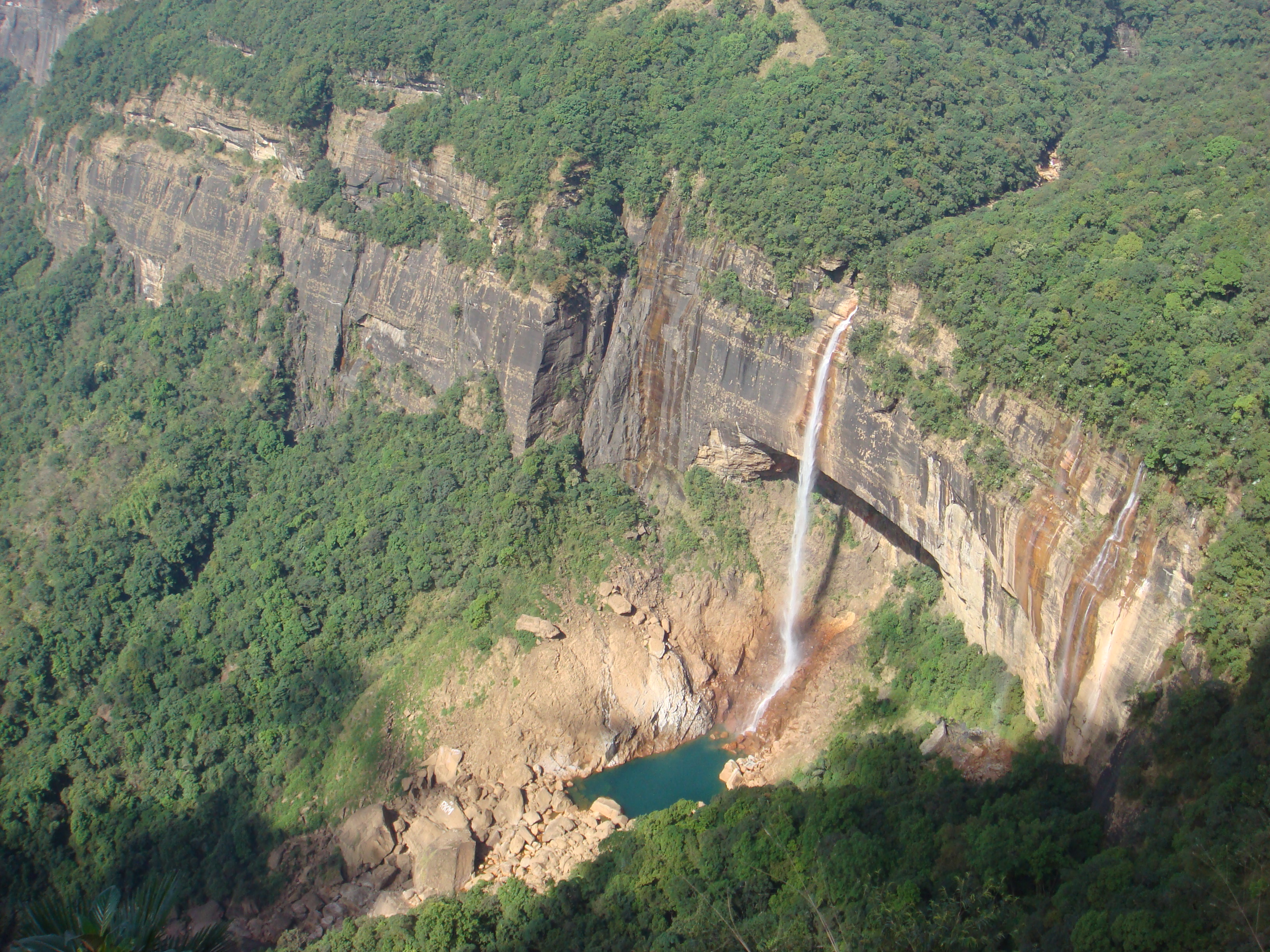
Nohkalikai Falls

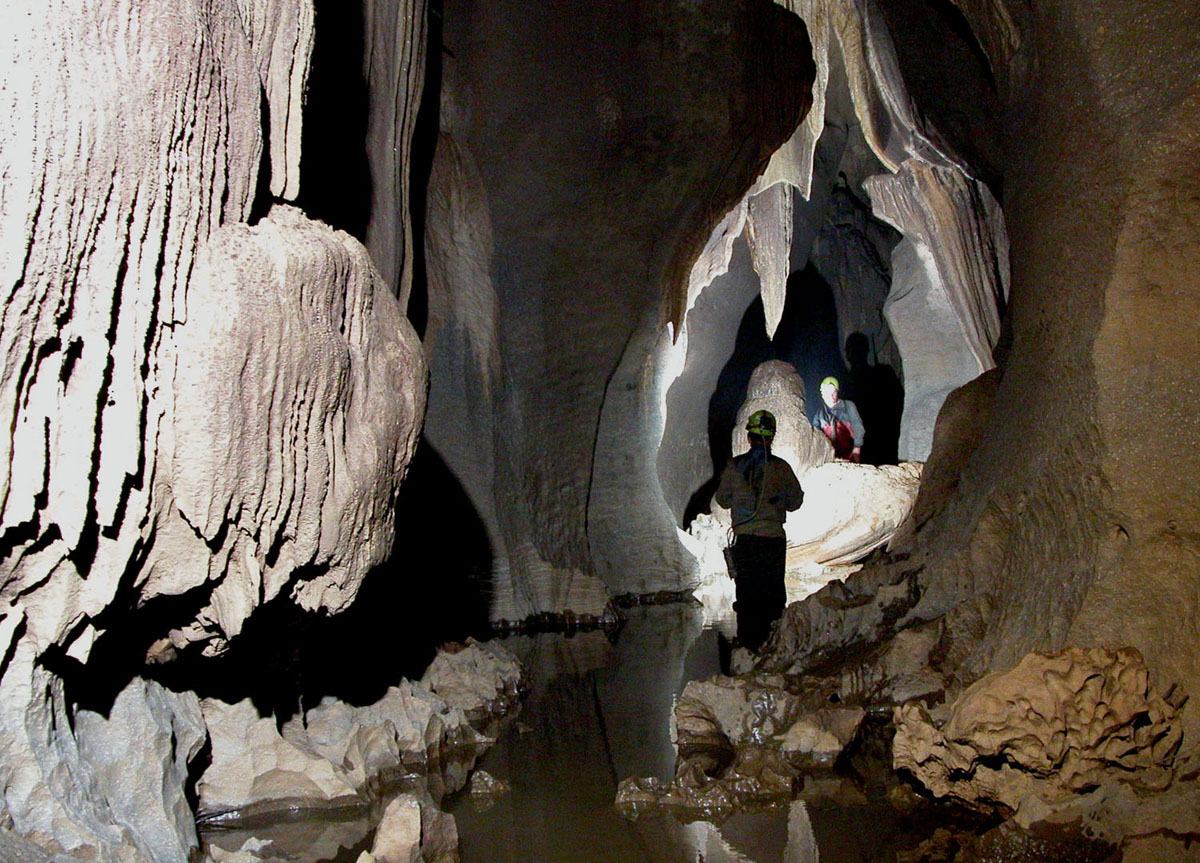
Meghalaya has many limestone caves. Above are in Jaintia Hills

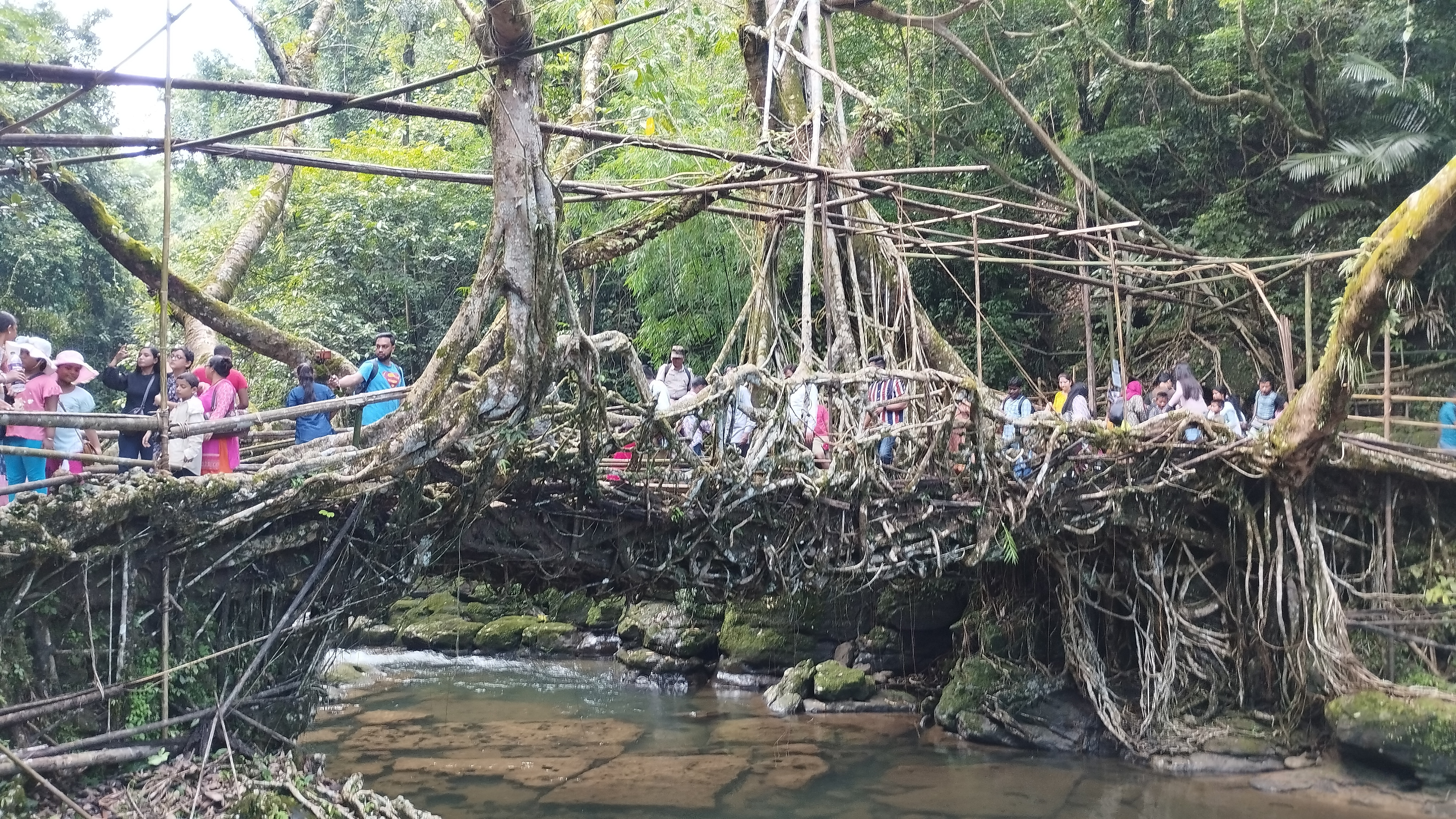
Single Decker Living Root Bridge at Riwai

Other important places of tourism interest Meghalaya include:

- Jakrem: 64 km from Shillong, a potential health resort having gushing hot-spring of sulphur water, believed to have curative medicinal properties.
- Ranikor: 140 km from Shillong, is one of Meghalaya's most popular spots for angling, with an abundance of carp and other freshwater fish.
- Dawki: 96 km from Shillong, is a border town, where one can have a glimpse of the neighbouring country of Bangladesh. The colourful annual boat race during spring at the Umngot river is an added attraction.
- Kshaid Dain Thlen Falls: Located near Cherrapunji, meaning the falls where the mythical monster of Khasi legend was finally butchered. The axe-marks made on the rocks where Thlen was butchered are stillintact and visible.
- Diengiei Peak: Located to the west of the Shillong plateau, Diengiei Peak is just 200 feet lower than Shillong peak. On the top of Diengiei, there is a huge hollow, shaped like a cup, believed to be the crater of an extinct pre-historic volcano.
- Dwarksuid: A scenic pool with wide, rocky sandbanks located on a stream alongside the Umroi-Bhoilymbong Road is known as Dwarksuid or Devil's doorway.
- Kyllang Rock: Located about 11 kilometres off Mairang, is a several million years old steep dome of red granite rising to an elevation of about 5400 feet above sea level.
- Sacred Forest Mawphlang: One of the most celebrated sacred-groves of the State is the grove at Mawphlang about 25 kilometres off Shillong. Preserved since time immemorial, these sacred groves have wide range of flora, thick cushion of humus on the grounds accumulated over the centuries, and trees heavily loaded with epiphytic growth of aroids, pipers, ferns, fern-allies and orchids.

== Major issues ==
The significant issues in the state include illegal migrants from Bangladesh, incidences of violence, political instability, and deforestation from traditional cut-and-burn shift farming practices. There have been several clashes between Khasi people and Bangladeshi in Meghalaya.

=== Illegal immigration ===
Illegal immigration has become a major issue in Indian states that surround Bangladesh – West Bengal to the west, Meghalaya and Assam to the north, and Tripura, Mizoram, and Manipur to the east. Dozens of political and civic groups have demanded that this migration be stopped or controlled to manageable levels. The border between Meghalaya and Bangladesh is about 440 kilometres long, of which some 350 is fenced; but the border is not continuously patrolled and is porous. Efforts are underway to fence it completely and introduce means to issue ID cards.

Chief Minister Mukul Sangma, in August 2012, called upon Government of India to take corrective measures to stop the illegal immigration of Bangladeshis into the northeast of the country before the situation goes out of hand.

=== Violence ===
Between 2006 and 2013, between 0 and 28 civilians have died per year in Meghalaya (or about 0 to 1 per 100,000 people), which the state authorities have classified as terror-related intentional violence. The world's average annual death rate from intentional violence, in recent years, has been 7.9 per 100,000 people. The terror-related deaths are from conflicts primarily between different tribal groups and against migrants from Bangladesh. Along with political resolution and dialogue, various Christian organisations have taken the initiative to prevent violence and help the process of discussion between groups.

There have been repeated clashes with Assam e.g. Mukroh.

=== Political instability ===
The state has had 23 state governments since its inception in 1972, with a median life span of less than 18 months. Only three governments have survived more than three years. Political instability has affected the state's economy in the past. Over recent years, there has been increasing political stability. The last state assembly elections were held in 2013, after a five-year government that was elected in 2008.

=== Jhum farming ===
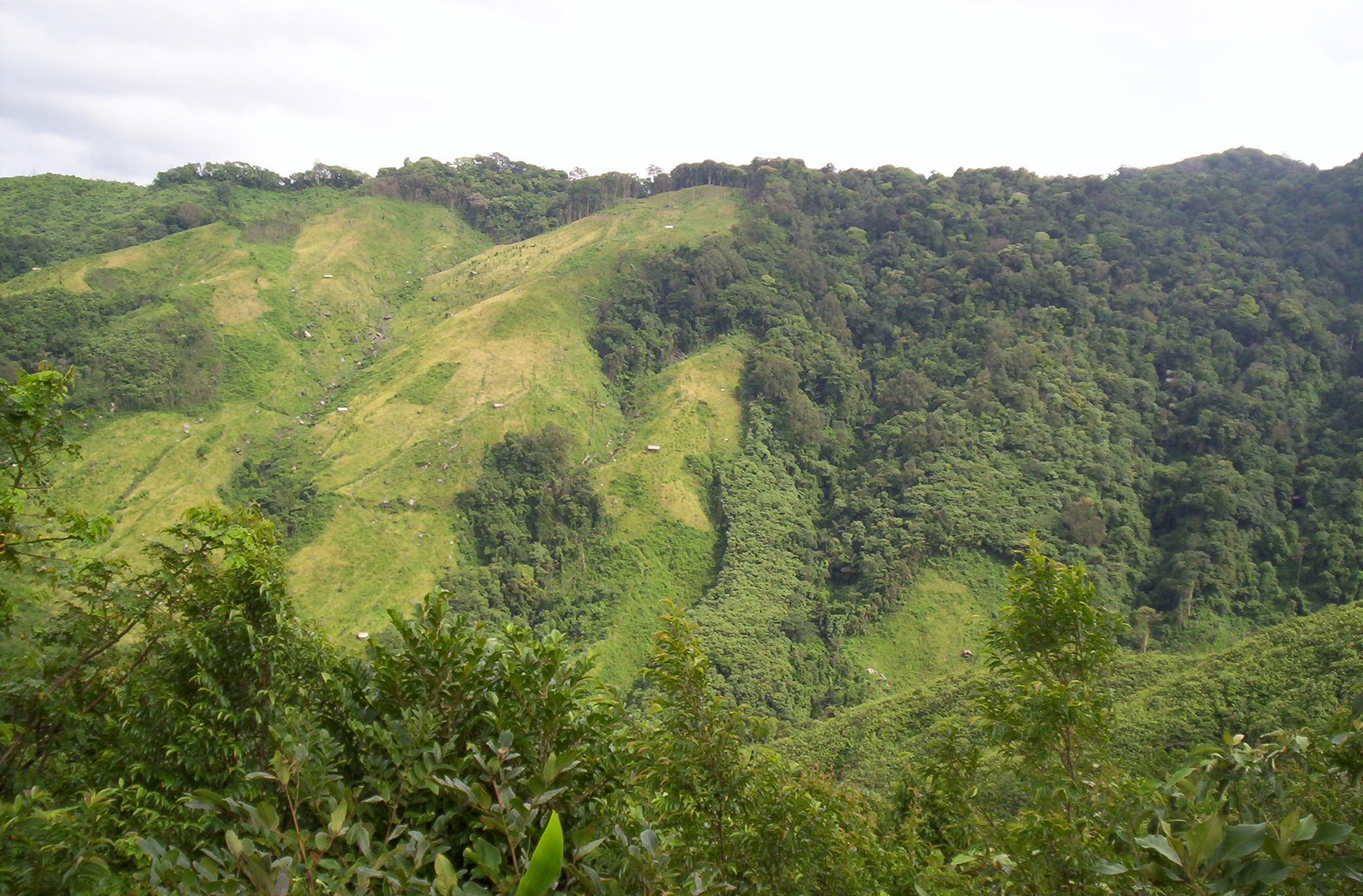
Jhum cultivation, or cut-and-burn shift farming, in Nokrek Biosphere Reserve of Meghalaya.

Jhum farming, or cut-and-burn shift cultivation, is an ancient practice in Meghalaya. It is culturally engrained through folklores. One legend states the god of wind with the god of hail and storm shook off seeds from the celestial tree, which were picked up and sown by a bird known as do' amik. These were the seeds of rice. The god gave the human beings some of those celestial seeds, provided instruction on shift agriculture and proper rice cultivation practice, with the demand that at every harvest a portion of the first harvest must be dedicated to him. Another folktale is from the Garo Hills of Meghalaya where a man named Bone-Neripa-Jane-Nitepa harvested rice and millet from a patch of land he cleared and cultivated near the rock named misi-Kokdok. He then shared this knowledge with others, and named the different months of the year, each of which is a stage of shifting cultivation.

In modern times, shift cultivation is a significant threat to the biodiversity of Meghalaya. A 2001 satellite imaging study showed that shift cultivation practice continues and patches of primary dense forests are lost even from areas protected as biosphere. Jhum farming is a threat not only for natural biodiversity, it is also a low yield unproductive method of agriculture. It is a significant issue in Meghalaya, given majority of its people rely on agriculture to make a living. Shift farming is a practice that is not unique to northeastern Indian states such as Meghalaya, but the issue is found throughout southeast Asia.

== Media ==
Some major media outlets in the state are:

- Meghalaya Times: Meghalaya Times is one of the new entrants in the market and the fastest growing English newspaper in the state. In a short period of time, it has already established large readership across the state.
- Salantini Janera: Salantini Janera is the first Garo language Daily of the state
- Shillong Samay: Shillong Samay is the first Hindi Daily of the State.
- Shillong Times: Shillong Times is one of the oldest English newspapers of the region.
- The Meghalaya Guardian: The Meghalaya Guardian is one of the oldest newspapers of the state.

Over the years there have been several weeklies and Dailies that have come up. To name a few:

- The Tura Times: The Tura Times is the first English Daily which is published out from Tura.
- Salantini Ku'rang: Salantini Ku'rang is the Garo edition of The Tura Times, Pringprangni Aski being the most recent Garo language newspaper to circulate.
- U Nongsaiñ Hima: U Nongsaiñ Hima is the oldest circulating Khasi newspaper in Meghalaya. Established in December 1960, it is now the highest circulated Khasi daily (ABC July – December 2013).
- 'Mawphor': It is one of the daily newspaper circulating in Jowai, Meghalaya.

Weekly Employment Newsletter which is distributed throughout the state:

- Shillong Weekly Express: Weekly Newsletter that was started in 2010.
- Eclectic northeast
