= Eastern West Khasi Hills district =

District in Meghalaya, India

- District of Meghalaya
- Coordinates: 25.56°N 91.62°E
- Country: India
- State: Meghalaya
- Established: 10 November 2021
- Headquarters: Mairang

Government
  - Deputy Commissioner: Smti. Anita Kharpor

Area
  - Total: 1,356.77 km^{2} (523.85 sq mi)
- Highest elevation (Mawthadraishan Peak): 1,924.5 m (6,314 ft)

Population (2011)
  - Total: 131,451
  - Density: 96.8852/km^{2} (250.932/sq mi)
- Time zone: UTC+5:30 (IST)

Eastern West Khasi Hills district is a district in the Indian state of Meghalaya, located approximately 25 kilometres (16 mi) west of the state capital of Shillong. It was created in 2021, after bifurcation of existing West Khasi Hills district. The territories which make up the district recorded a total population of 131,451 in the 2011 census. The district headquarters is the town of Mairang.

== Geography ==
The Eastern West Khasi Hills district is located in the Khasi Hills of central Meghalaya. It borders the districts of Ri Bhoi to the north, East Khasi Hills to the southeast, South West Khasi Hills to the south, and West Khasi Hills to the west. It covers an area of 1,356.77 square kilometres (523.85 sq mi) and comprises 6% of the state's area.

The Mawthadraishan Range runs east to west through the district. The highest elevation in the district is Mawthadraishan Peak at 1,924.5 metres (6,314 ft) above sea level, located approximately midway between the towns of Nongstoin and Mairang. Another notable elevation in the district is Kyllang Rock, a large granitic dome located 9 kilometres (5.6 mi) northwest of Mairang at 1,774 metres (5,820 ft) above sea level. This rock is personified as a man in various Khasi legends: one says that he is married to Thadlaskein Lake near Jowai, and another describes his battles with Symper Rock to the south near Mawkyrwat.

The central uplands of the district form a divide between the drainage basins of the Brahmaputra River to the north and the Meghna River to the south. Notable rivers in the district are the Kynshi River in the south; the Khri River in the north, which becomes the Kulsi River when it enters Assam at Ukiam; and the Khrisynnia (or Krishniya) River, a tributary of the Khri.

The district's climate varies from temperate in the central uplands to mildly tropical in the northern and southern foothills. Most of the rainfall in the district occurs during the southwest monsoon between May and August. Mairang receives an average annual rainfall of about 2,500 millimetres (98 in).

== History ==
The Khasi people are the indigenous inhabitants of the area. Tirot Sing, the leader of Khasi resistance in the Anglo-Khasi War of 1829–1833, was the syiem or chief of Nongkhlaw, which is located about 15 kilometres (9.3 mi) north of Mairang. A memorial in his honour was erected in Mairang in 1953–1954. Never formally part of British India, the 25 Khasi states acceded to the Dominion of India in 1948 and were given autonomy under the Sixth Schedule of the Constitution of India.

When the state of Meghalaya was created in 1972, the Khasi Hills were part of the United Khasi and Jaintia Hills District, which was separated into the districts of Khasi Hills and Jaintia Hills later that year. The Khasi Hills district was divided into West and East Khasi Hills districts on 28 October 1976, and Mairang Subdivision was created on 10 November 1976 in West Khasi Hills. The community development block of Mawthadraishan was created on 20 March 2001 from parts of the Mairang, Mawkyrwat and Nongstoin CD blocks. On November 10, 2021, the Mairang and Mawthadraishan CD blocks were separated from West Khasi Hills to form the new district of Eastern West Khasi Hills.

There was also a lot of controversy concerning the name chosen for the district, as the nomenclature was a geographical and topographical anomaly.

== Administration ==
Eastern West Khasi Hills is divided into two community development (CD) blocks, Mairang and Mawthadraishan. The current deputy commissioner of the district is Wilfred Nongsiej. The district falls within the scheduled area of the Khasi Hills Autonomous District Council.

== Demographics ==
Religion in Eastern West Khasi Hills (2011)
Religions
Christians	94.94%
Others*	3.69%
Other or not stated	1.37%
*Animists and ethnic religions

The district has a total population of 131,451, of which 66,016 are males and 65,435 are females. Scheduled Castes and Scheduled Tribes make up 11 (0.01%) and 129,758 (98.71%) of the population.

== Economy and infrastructure ==
The main economic activity in the district is agriculture. Main crops grown include paddy rice, maize, and potatoes.

National Highway 106 runs east to west through the district, connecting it to Shillong in the east and Nongstoin in the west. Meghalaya State Highway 3 runs north from Mairang through Nongkhlaw, connecting the district to Ri Bhoi district and the state of Assam.
