= Nongkhnum River Island =

River island in Meghalaya, India

- Location within Meghalaya

Geography
- Location: Meghalaya
- Coordinates: 25.444°N 91.253°E
- Total islands: 1
- Area: 21 km^{2} (8.1 sq mi)

Administration
- India
- State: Meghalaya
- District: West Khasi Hills district

Additional information
- Time zone: IST (UTC+5:30)
- PIN: 793119
- Telephone code: 03654
- Official website: westkhasihills.gov.in

Nongkhnum River Island is the biggest river island in the Indian state of Meghalaya. The island is formed by the river Wah Kynshi on the west and south and river Namiliang on the north and east. Often erroneously claimed to be the second largest river island in Asia, especially for promoting tourism, there are numerous other river islands in Asia much bigger in size than the Nongkhnum Island.

== Location ==
The island is located in the West Khasi Hills district of Meghalaya at a distance of about 14 Km from the district headquarters Nongstoin and at a distance of about 63 km from Mairang Sub‐Division.

== Attractions ==
The island contains a sandy beach as well as two waterfalls, the Weina Falls and the Langshiang Falls. Tourist footfall remains low, primarily owing to poor infrastructure in the area.
