= List of districts of Meghalaya =

Districts of Meghalaya
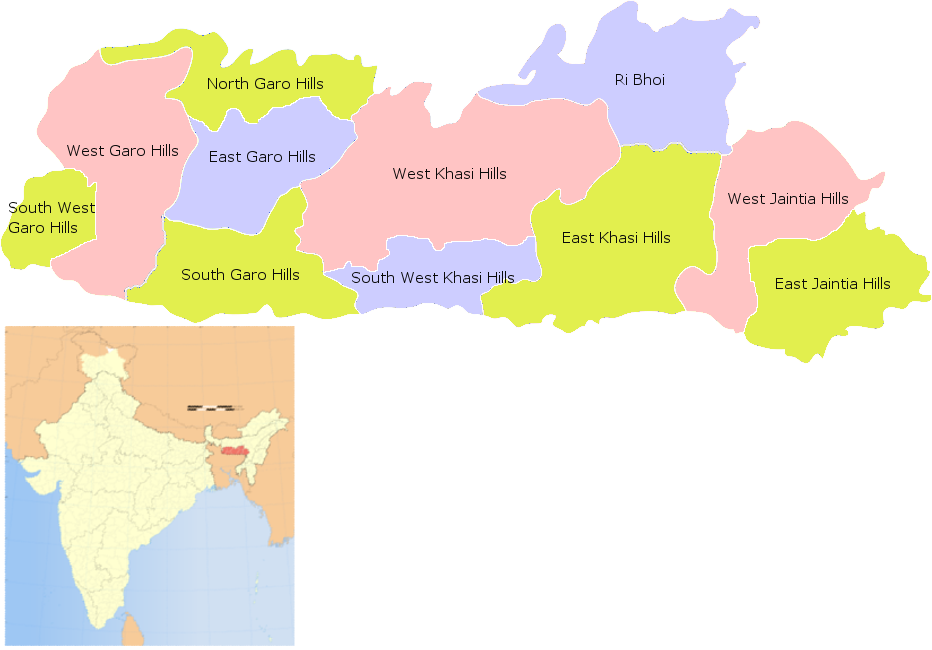
- Districts of Meghalaya (Eastern West Khasi Hills district not shown)
- Location: Meghalaya
- Number: 12
- Populations: 110,152 (South West Khasi Hills) – 825,922 (East Khasi Hills)
- Areas: 822 km2 (South West Garo Hills) – 3,890 km2 (West Khasi Hills)
- Government: Government of Meghalaya
- Subdivisions: Revenue divisions

The Indian state of Meghalaya is divided into 12 districts. Meghalaya is divided into 2 administrative divisions, namely the Garo Hills Division (Western Division), having its headquarters in West Garo Hills District and the Khasi Hills Division (Eastern Division), having its head quarters in the East Khasi Hills District.

== Districts ==
Meghalaya currently has 12 districts:

District	Headquarter	Region	Area (km²)	Population (2011)	Established
North Garo Hills	Resubelpara	Garo Hills	1,113	118,325	2012
East Garo Hills	Williamnagar	Garo Hills	1,490	199,592	1976
South Garo Hills	Baghmara	Garo Hills	1,850	142,334	1992
West Garo Hills	Tura	Garo Hills	2,855	472,497	1976
South West Garo Hills	Ampati	Garo Hills	822	172,495	2012
West Jaintia Hills	Jowai	Jaintia Hills	1,693	270,352	2012
East Jaintia Hills	Khliehriat	Jaintia Hills	2,040	122,939	2012
East Khasi Hills	Shillong	Khasi Hills	2,752	825,922	1976
West Khasi Hills	Nongstoin	Khasi Hills	3,890	252,010	1976
South West Khasi Hills	Mawkyrwat	Khasi Hills	1,341	110,152	2012
Eastern West Khasi Hills	Mairang	Khasi Hills	1,356.77	131,451	2021
Ri-Bhoi	Nongpoh	Khasi Hills	2,378	258,840	1992
