= Bynther =

- Village
- Houses in Madan or Lower Bynther

- Location in Meghalaya, India Bynther (India)
- Coordinates: 25.542441°N 91.608581°E
- Country: India
- State: Meghalaya
- District: Eastern West Khasi Hills
- Block: Mairang
- Time zone: UTC+5:30 (IST)
- Vehicle registration: ML

Bynther is a village in the Mairang block of Eastern West Khasi Hills District in Meghalaya, India. The village is divided into mainly two parts: Upper Bynther and Lower Bynther (Madan Bynther). The famous folk singer Skendrowell Syiemlieh lived here.
