= Pnar language =

Austroasiatic language spoken in India and Bangladesh

Pnar
- Jaiñtia
- Ka Ktien Pnar
- Pronunciation: /kɑ kt̪eːn pnɑr/
- Native to: India, Bangladesh
- Ethnicity: Pnar people
- Native speakers: 395,124 (2011 census)
- Language family: Austroasiatic: Khasi-Palaungic; Khasic; Khasi-Pnar-Lyngngam; Pnar
- Dialects: Nartiang; Nonjngi; Nongbah; Jowai; Mynso; Shilliang Myntang

Language codes
- ISO 639-3: pbv
- Glottolog: pnar1238
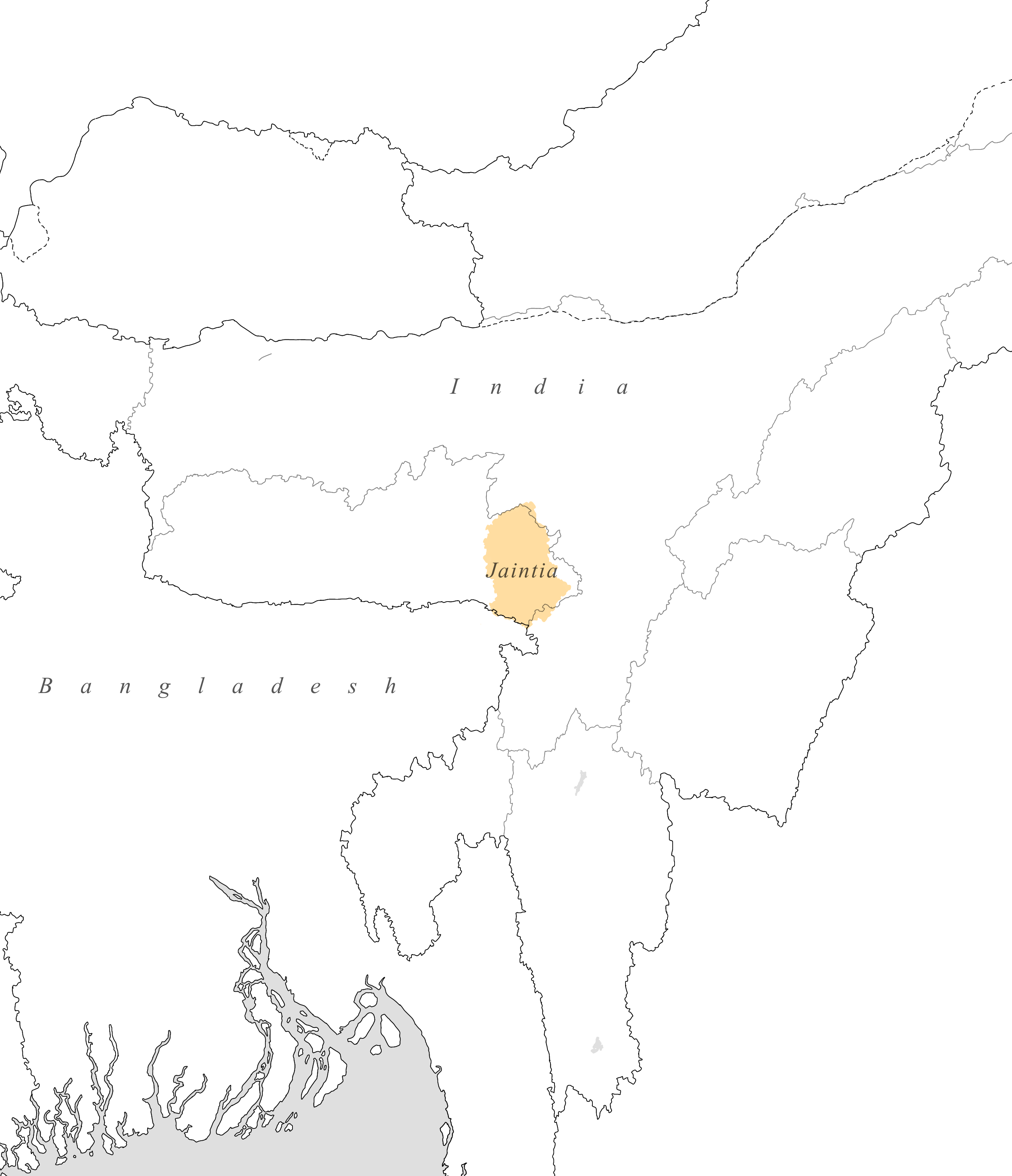
- Map of the Pnar Language

- Pnar is classified as Vulnerable by the UNESCO Atlas of the World's Languages in Danger.

Pnar (Ka Ktien Pnar), also known as Jaiñtia is an Austroasiatic language spoken in India and Bangladesh.

== Geographic distribution ==
As a Khasic language, Pnar belongs to a complex dialect continuum which includes mixed varieties whose exact relations remain a matter of debate among linguists. A language map of Meghalaya designed by Anna Daladier shows two major Pnar-speaking areas separated by a thin strip of Khasi and War-speaking areas. Together, the two Pnar areas encompass most of the East Jaintia Hills, West Jaintia Hills and West Khasi Hills districts.

A more recent map designed by Hiram Ring for a Khasic languages handbook by Paul Sidwell relies on a different classification. There, only the former two districts are labeled as Pnar, whereas the varieties spoken in the West Khasi Hills belong to Maharam, a related but distinct language. Both maps also show small pockets of Pnar speakers in the neighboring state of Assam, In the former map, they are limited to the area directly adjacent to Meghalaya, whereas the latter map also shows a group of Pnar-speaking villages around Haflong. Daladier (2010) lists around twelve Pnar dialects or so within the East and West Jaintia Hills.

== Phonology ==
Pnar has 30 phonemes: 7 vowels and 23 consonants. Other sounds listed below are phonetic realizations.

=== Vowels ===
	Front	Central	Back
Close	i		u
Close-mid	e		o
Open-mid	ɛ		ɔ
Open		a	

- Voicing in onset clusters are realized as epenthetic [ɨ] and [ə]. E.g. [tᵊdɔŋ] 'tail'.
- /i/ is pronounced [ɪ] before a coronal coda.
- /a/ is pronounced [ʌ] in unstressed syllables.

There is also one diphthong: /ia/ (phonetically [ia̯, iʌ̯, iɛ]).

=== Consonants ===
		Labial	Dental -laminal	Alveolar	Postalv./ Palatal	Velar	Glottal
Nasal		m		n	ɲ	ŋ	
Plosive	voiceless	p	t̪	t	tʃ	k	ʔ
Plosive	voiced	b	d̪	d	dʒ		
Plosive	voiceless aspirated	pʰ		tʰ		kʰ	
Fricative				s			h
Liquid				l r			
Approximant		w			j		

Dental-laminal /t̪ d̪/ are restricted to coda positions. All stops in coda positions tend to be unreleased, except /tʃ dʒ/, which occur in coda positions as much shorter stops [c] and [ɟ] while being underlyingly affricatives elsewhere, respectively.

=== Syllable structure ===
Syllables in Pnar can consist of a single nucleic vowel. Maximally, they can include a complex onset of two consonants, a diphthong nucleus, and a coda consonant. A second type of syllable contains a syllabic nasal/trill/lateral immediately following the onset consonant. This syllabic consonant behaves as the rhyme. (Ring, 2012: 141–2)

=== Prosody ===
Pnar has neither lexical tone nor register. In word-level prominence, stress is heavier in the final syllable than in preceding syllables. In wh-sentences, intonation rises in the last word. Commands and statements generally produce falling intonation or a slight rise.

== Grammar ==
Pnar has a grammatical gender system, and its default word order is verb initial, unusual both for its family, and the area in which it's spoken.
