= Duitara =

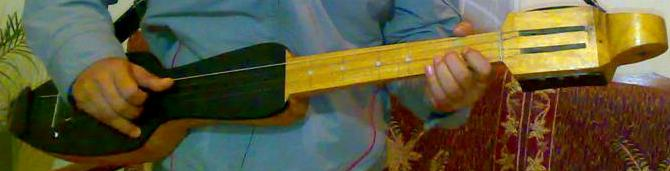
Duitara Instrument

Duitara (called as Ka Duitara) is a four-stringed Khasi and Jaintia folk musical instrument of Meghalaya that resembles a guitar. The term seems similar to the dotara instrument played in the neighboring states of Assam and West Bengal. The duitara consists of medium soft wood, the hollow in the belly of its main body is covered with dried animal skin, and its neck has at its end four holes in which wooden pegs hold the strings in tune. The strings are made of 'muga' silk. The folk musician Skendrowell Syiemlieh was an accomplished artist of this instrument. Duitara is unlike the bow-shaped veena, santoor, ektara, tambura, jantar, sarod and sarangi.
