= Maram =

Maram may refer to:

- Maram people, tribals of northeast India
  - Maram language, a Naga language of India
- Maram language (Austroasiatic), also of India
- Maram (horse) (2006–2012), an American female Thoroughbred racehorse
- Maram (drum), a percussion instrument from South India
- Maram (film), an Indian film released in 1973

== See also ==
- Marram grass, a species of grasses in genus Ammophila
