= Nonglang =

Village in Meghalaya, India

Nonglang village is located in Mawkyrwat Tehsil of South West Khasi Hills district in Meghalaya in India.
