= LYG =

LYG or lyg may refer to:

- LYG, the IATA code for Lianyungang Huaguoshan International Airport, Jiangsu Province, China
- LYG, the NYSE code for Lloyds Banking Group, a British financial institution
- LYG, the Pinyin code for Lianyungang railway station, Jiangsu Province, China
- Lymphomatoid granulomatosis, a very rare lymphoproliferative disorder
- lyg, the ISO 639-3 code for Lyngngam language, India
