= Khasic languages =

Family of Austroasiatic languages native to the Shillong Plateau

Khasic
- Geographic distribution: India, Bangladesh
- Linguistic classification: Austroasiatic: Khasi–Palaungic; Khasic
- Proto-language: Proto-Khasic
- Subdivisions: War; Pnar-Khasi-Lyngngam

Language codes
- Glottolog: khas1268
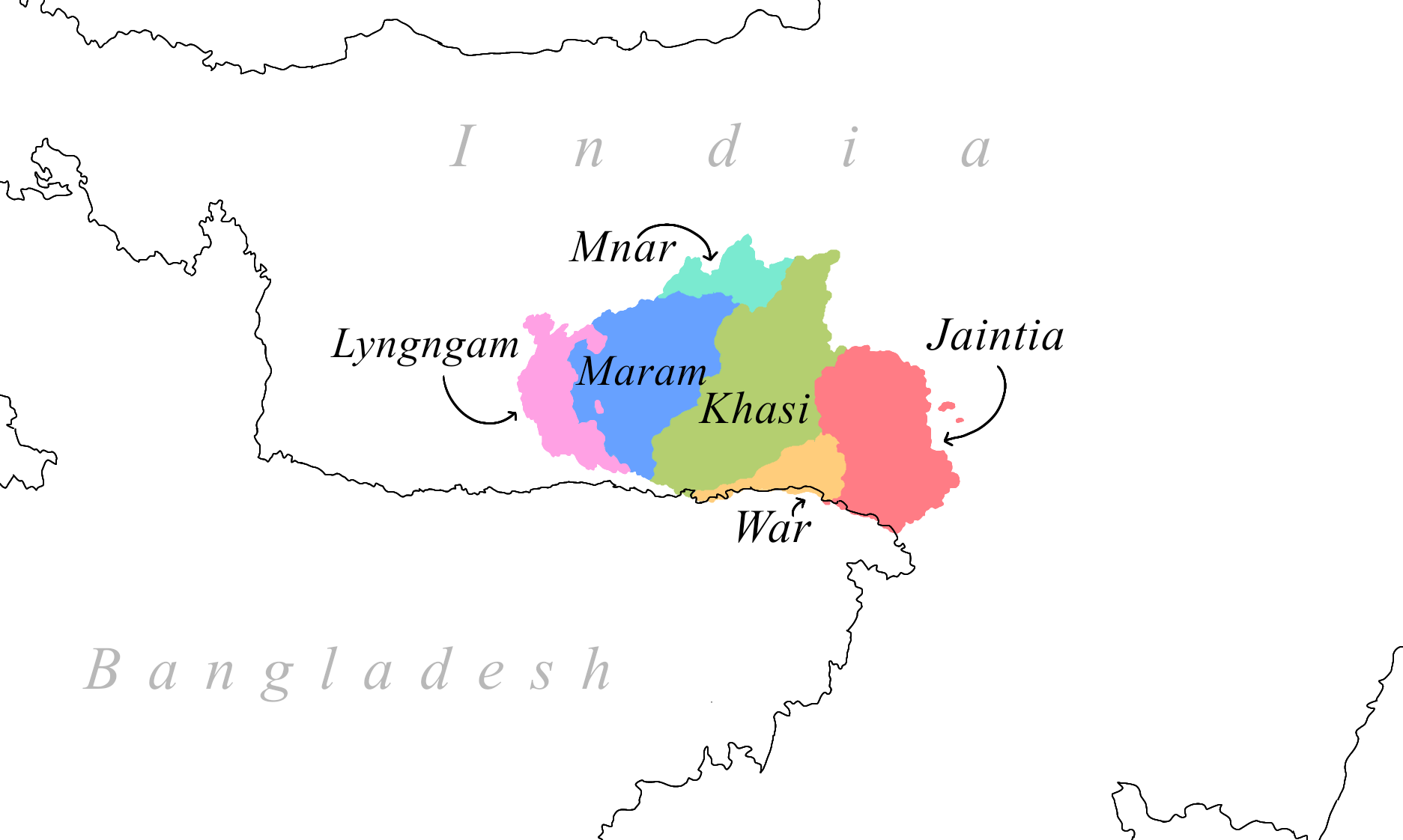
- Map of the Khasic languages

The Khasic or Khasian languages are a family of Austroasiatic languages native to the Shillong Plateau and spoken by the Khasi, Pnar and other related ethnic groups. Most of them reside in the northeastern Indian state of Meghalaya where Khasi speakers form a plurality of the population. Smaller Khasic-speaking pockets are found in Assam, Manipur, Mizoram and Sylhet Division of Bangladesh.

== Languages ==
Sidwell (2018: 27–31) classifies the Khasian languages as follows.

- Proto-Khasian
  - War (Amwi, Mnar)
  - Proto–Pnar-Khasi-Lyngngam
    - Lyngngam (former Garo-speakers)
      - Pnar (Jaintia)
      - Khasi
      - Maharam (Maram)

Varieties called Bhoi are dialects of both Pnar and Khasi.

== External relationships ==
Paul Sidwell (2011) suggests that Khasian is closely related to Palaungic, forming a Khasi–Palaungic branch.

The following eight Khasian-Palaungic isoglosses have been identified by Sidwell (2018: 32).

| Gloss | Proto-Khasian (Sidwell 2018) | Proto-Palaungic (Sidwell 2015) |
|---|---|---|
| blood | *snaːm | *snaːm |
| claw/nail | *trʧʰiːm | *rənsiːm |
| hair | *sɲuʔ | *ɲuk |
| man/husband | trmɛ (Amwi) | *-meʔ |
| rain | *slap; slɛ (Amwi) | *clɛʔ |
| swim | *ɟŋiː | *ŋɔj |
| two | *ʔaːr | *ləʔaːr |
| water | *ʔum | *ʔoːm |

== Lexical innovations ==
Sidwell (2018: 23) lists the following Khasian lexical innovations (i.e., defining lexical forms) that are found exclusively in the Khasian branch, but not in other Austroasiatic branches).

| English gloss | Proto-Khasian | Lyngngam | Maram | Khasi | Pnar | Mnar | War |
|---|---|---|---|---|---|---|---|
| cooked rice | *ʤaː | ʥa | ʤa | ja /ʤaː/ | ʤa | ci | ʧi |
| moon | *bnəːj | bni | bne | bnai /bnaːi/ | bnaj | pni | pnʊ |
| to sing | *rwəːj | rəŋwi | rwej | rwái /rwaːi/ | rwaj | – | rvʊ |
| four | *saːw | saw | saw | sáw /saːw/ | so | sɔu | ria |
| river | *waʔ | – | waɁ | wah /waːʔ/ | waɁ | waɁ | waɁ |
| all | *barɔɁ | prok | barɔʔ | baroh /barɔːʔ/ | warɔʔ | – | bərɒʔ |
| pig | *sniaŋ | sɲaŋ | sniaŋ | sniang /sniaŋ/ | sniaŋ | cʰɲaŋ | rniŋ |
| sand | *ʧʔiap | ʥʔep | ʧiʔɛp | shyiap /ʃʔiap/ | ʧʔiap | ʃʔip | ʃʔiap |
| to drink | *di:ʔ/c | dec | dɔc | dih /diːʔ/ | diʔ | deʔ | deʔ |
| flower/star | *kʰloːr | kʰlor | kʰlɔr | khlúr /kʰloːr/ | kʰlor | – | khlʊə |
| tongue | *tʰnləːc | təloc | tʰl̩let | thyllied /tʰɨlleːc/ | tʰl̩leɟ | kʰlut | kʰlit |
| ice/freeze | *tʰaʔ | tʰaʔ | tʰaʔ | thah /tʰaːʔ/ | tʰaʔ | tʰaʔ | tʰaʔ |

== Reconstruction ==
Proto-Khasian and Proto-Pnar-Khasi-Lyngngam have been reconstructed by Paul Sidwell (2018). Proto-Khasian is estimated to have originated about 2,000-2,500 years ago, with War splitting from other Khasian linguistic varieties about 1,500 years ago (Sidwell 2018: 20).

Proto-Khasian morphology includes a causative *pN- prefix and verbalizing *-r- infix (Sidwell 2018: 66-67).

The following reconstructed paradigmatic and closed class morphemes in Proto-Khasian are from Sidwell (2018: 51-67).

Personal pronouns

| | Masculine | Feminine | Plural |
|---|---|---|---|
| 1st person | *ŋa (topic/oblique); *ʔɔ (default) | *ŋa (topic/oblique); *ʔɔ (default) | *ʔi |
| 2nd person | *me | *pʰa | *pʰi |
| 3rd person (animate) | *ʔu | *ka | *ki |
| 3rd person (inanimate ~ diminutive) | *ʔi | *ʔi | *ʔi |

Demonstratives

- *ni 'proximal'
- *tu 'mesiodistal'
- *taj 'distal (visible)'
- *te 'mesioproximal'
- *tɛ 'distal (non-visible)'

Negators

- *ʔǝm 'not'
- *ham 'do not'
- *ta 'not'

Prepositions/case markers

- *ha 'locative/oblique'
- *ʤɔŋ 'to possess'
- *da 'instrumental'
- *ba (?) 'and/with'
- *tV 'oblique'

Tense/aspect morphemes

- *la:j 'to go'
- *dɛp 'finish'
- *diʔ 'to go'
- *daː 'have'
- *ʤuʔ 'same'

Morphological affixes

- *pN- 'prefix'
- *-r- 'verbalizer'

Numerals

| Gloss | Proto-Khasian | Proto-Pnar- Khasi-Lyngngam |
|---|---|---|
| one | *wiː~*miː | |
| one | *ʧiː | |
| two | *ʔaːr | |
| three | *laːj | |
| four | *saːw | |
| five | *san | |
| six | *tʰruː | |
| seven | | *ʰnɲəw |
| eight | | *pʰraː |
| nine | | *kʰndaːj |
| ten | *pʰəw | |

== Sound changes ==
Sidwell (2018) lists the following sound changes from Pre-Khasian (i.e., the ancestral stage of Khasian that preceded Proto-Khasian) to Proto-Khasian.

- Pre-Khasian *b- > *p-, *ɓ- > *b- chain shift
  - Proto-Austroasiatic *b- > proto-Khasian *p-
  - Proto-Austroasiatic *ɓ- > proto-Khasian *b-
- Pre-Khasian *d- > *t-, * ɗ- > *d- chain shift
  - Proto-Austroasiatic *d- > proto-Khasian *t-
  - Proto-Austroasiatic *ɗ- > proto-Khasian *d-
- Pre-Khasian *-l > *-n/*-Ø
- Pre-Khasian *-h > *-s > *-t
- Pre-Khasian *-ʔ > *-Ø >, *-k > *-ʔ chain shift
- Pre-Khasian *g- > *k-

== See also ==
- List of Proto-Khasian reconstructions (Wiktionary)
