= David R. Syiemlieh =

Indian historian and former UPSC Chairman

David Reid Syiemlieh
- Born: 22 January 1953 (age 73); Mutrapore, Assam, India
- Citizenship: Indian
- Education: North Eastern Hill University
- Known for: Research on North East Indian history, correction of historical records, UPSC leadership
- Awards: Padma Shri (2025)
- Scientific career
- Fields: History, Public Administration
- Workplaces: Union Public Service Commission; North Eastern Hill University; Rajiv Gandhi University; University of Notre Dame; Indian Council of Historical Research; Indian Council of Social Science Research

David Reid Syiemlieh (born 22 January 1953) is an Indian historian, academic, and former civil service administrator. He served as Chairman of the Union Public Service Commission (UPSC) and has held academic roles. In 2025, he was awarded the Padma Shri for his contributions to literature and education.

== Career ==
Syiemlieh attended Dr. Graham’s Homes, Kalimpong (1958–1970), and completed his BA at St. Edmund’s College, Shillong, followed by MA (1976), MPhil (1980), and PhD (1985) in History from North Eastern Hill University (NEHU), Shillong.

Beginning as a lecturer at St. Edmund’s College (1977–1979), he progressed at NEHU (1979–2011), holding roles including Head of Department, Dean, Registrar, and Pro-Vice-Chancellor. He became Vice‑Chancellor of Rajiv Gandhi University, Arunachal Pradesh, in October 2011. He also undertook a visiting scholar role at the University of Notre Dame, USA.

Appointed a Member of the UPSC in 2012, he later served as its Chairman from 4 January 2017 until January 2018.

=== Historical scholarship ===
Syiemlieh specializes in colonial/post‑colonial Northeast Indian history. He is credited with correcting the widely accepted death date of Khasi freedom fighter Tirot Sing - from 1834 to 17 July 1835 - after locating primary sources in the Bengal Judicial Consultations. He also clarified that Tirot Sing died under house arrest in Dhaka, not in prison.

== Awards and honours ==
- Padma Shri (2025) for literature and education

== Selected publications ==
- British Administration in Meghalaya: Policy and Pattern (1989)
- They Dared To Hope: The Holy Cross Congregation in India (2000)
- Survey of Research in History on North East India, 1970–1990 (2000)
- Early States in North East India (co-ed., Astral Publishers, 2013)
- On the Edge of Empire: Four British Plans for North East India (2014)
- Layers of History: Essays on the Khasi‑Jaintias (2015)
