= Skendrowell Syiemlieh =

Khasi poet and musical artist

Skendrowell Syiemlieh (died 2008) was a Khasi folk and Gospel singer. He was a master musician and an accomplished artist of the folk instrument known as the duitara. He was also the playback singer for the Khasi film U Manik Raitong.

Syiemlieh was the recipient of many awards, including a best vocalist award in 1975, and the U Tirot Sing Award for Arts and Literature in 1991. He was actively associated with the All India Radio Shillong since 1962. Syiemlieh was posthumously awarded the Padma Shri Award in Arts by the Government of India in 2009. Many of his musical albums were recorded at Usha Uthup's Studio Vibrations in Kolkata.

The Telegraph (Kolkata) reported on 5 January 2009:

A major lacuna in tribal societies is the absence of documentation of their cultural wealth and of recognizing personalities who have enriched their culture through songs, poetry, literature, and the performing arts. Khasi bard, singer, and radio artist Skendrowell Syiemlieh spent a good part of his adult life serving the society through songs for which he created his own lyrics and tune. Every singer is in some ways a historian who is either lamenting the current state of affairs, extolling the immediate past or inspiring hope for the future. The Khasis have a natural flair for singing. This is perhaps one reason why no one is celebrated as an outstanding singer. Syiemlieh died this year, unsung and unrecognised by his own people. It took a Guwahati-based trust, the Jeewan Ram Mungi Devi Goenka (JRMDG) Charitable Trust, to recognise this humble soul with a lifetime achievement award, posthumously, on December 6, 2008.

== Music Style ==
Syiemlieh's music style was a mixture of Khasi folk music and Western country narrative style that blended both folk instruments such as the duitara and flute with guitar, violin, and drums. Almost all of his recordings employed backing vocal harmonies. He would often begin his songs with the words "Ha sngap ho para ngan iathuh khana” (Listen o my brothers and sisters, I will tell you a story)"
