= South West Khasi Hills district =

- District of Meghalaya
- South West Khasi Hills district Location in Meghalaya
- Coordinates (Mawkyrwat): 25.3°N 91.2°E
- Country: India
- State: Meghalaya
- Headquarters: Mawkyrwat

Area
  - Total: 1,341 km^{2} (518 sq mi)

Population (2011)
  - Total: 110,152
  - Density: 82.14/km^{2} (212.7/sq mi)

Demographics
  - Literacy: 76.84
- Time zone: UTC+05:30 (IST)
- Website: southwestkhasihills.gov.in

South West Khasi Hills district is an administrative district in the state of Meghalaya in India.

== History ==
The Southwest Khasi Hills district was carved out of the West Khasi Hills district on 3 August 2012.

== Geography ==
The district headquarters is located at Mawkyrwat. The district occupies an area of 1,341 km^{2}. The district is compose all the villages of two Community & Rural Development Blocks viz. Ranikor and Mawkyrwat are Community & Rural Development Block, including 18 (Eighteen) Villages under Warsan Lyngdoh Gram Sevak Circle of Nongstoin in Community & Rural Development Block.

=== Administrative divisions ===
South West Khasi Hills district is divided into two blocks

Name	Headquarters	Population	Location
Mawkyrwat	Mawkyrwat		
Ranikor	Ranikor		
