= Mairang =

- city
- Location in Meghalaya, India Mairang (India)
- Coordinates: 25°33′42.698″N 91°38′5.728″E
- Country: India
- State: Meghalaya
- District: Eastern West Khasi Hills
- Elevation: 1,564 m (5,131 ft)

Population (2001)
  - Total: 11,517

Languages
  - Regional: Maram, Khasi
- Time zone: UTC+5:30 (IST)
- PIN: 793120
- Vehicle registration: ML
- Climate: Cwb

Mairang is the headquarters of Eastern West Khasi Hills district of Meghalaya, India. It is located at about 40 km from the state capital Shillong: and 45 km (approx.) from Nongstoin along National Highway 106.

== Geography ==
Mairang is located at 25.57°N 91.63°E. It has an average elevation of 1564 metres (5131 feet).

== Demographics ==
As of 2001 India census, Mairang had a population of 11,517. Males constitute 50% of the population and females 50%. Mairang has an average literacy rate of 62%, higher than the national average of 59.5%: male literacy is 62%, and female literacy is 63%. In Mairang, 22% of the population is under 6 years of age.

== Education ==
Khadsawphra College & Higher Secondary, Mairang Presbyterian Science College, and Tirot Sing Memorial College are three institutions of higher education in Mairang.

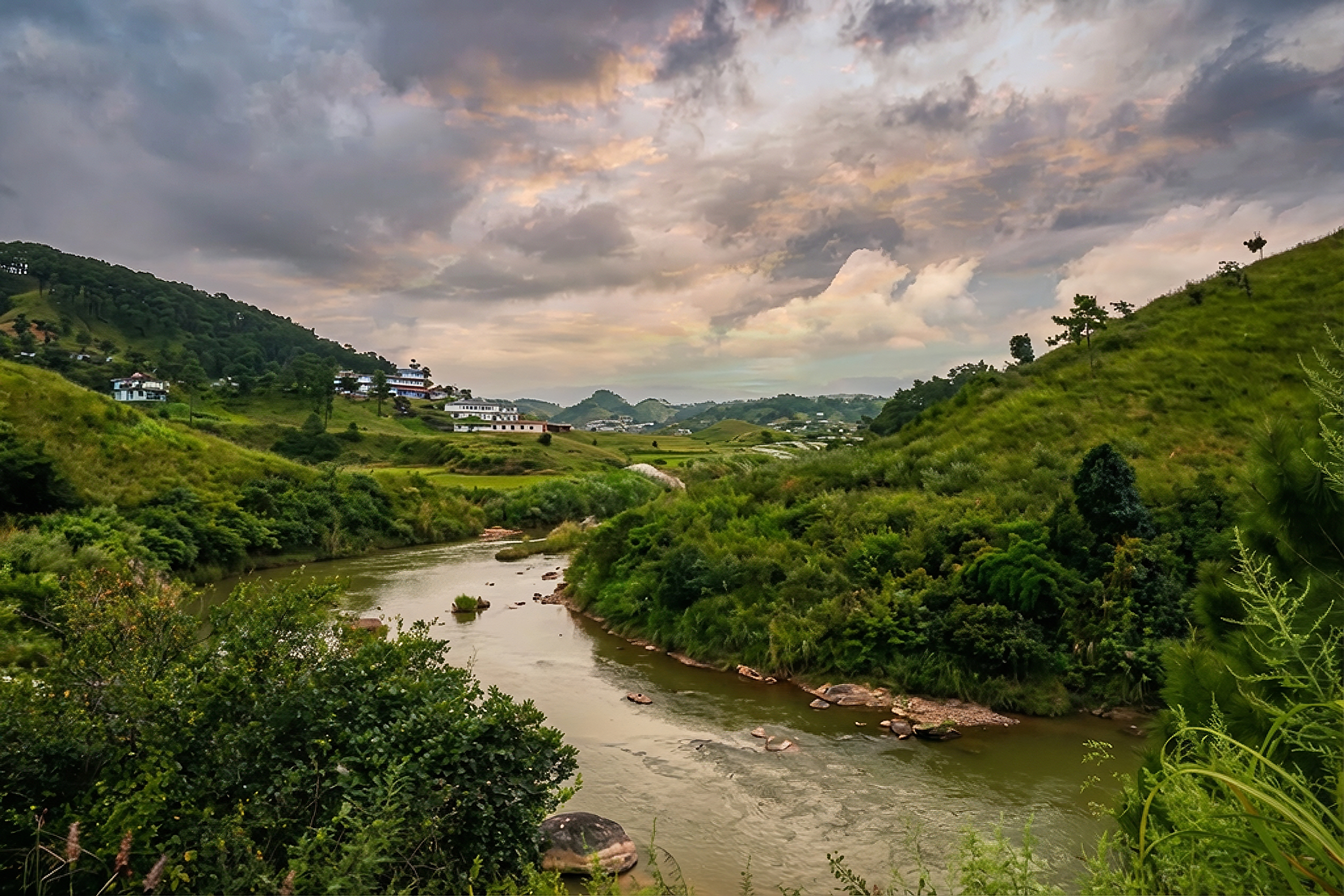
Mairang, Meghalaya

== See also ==
- Bynther
