= Khasi people =

Ethnic group in North-East India

Khasi
Hynñiewtrep
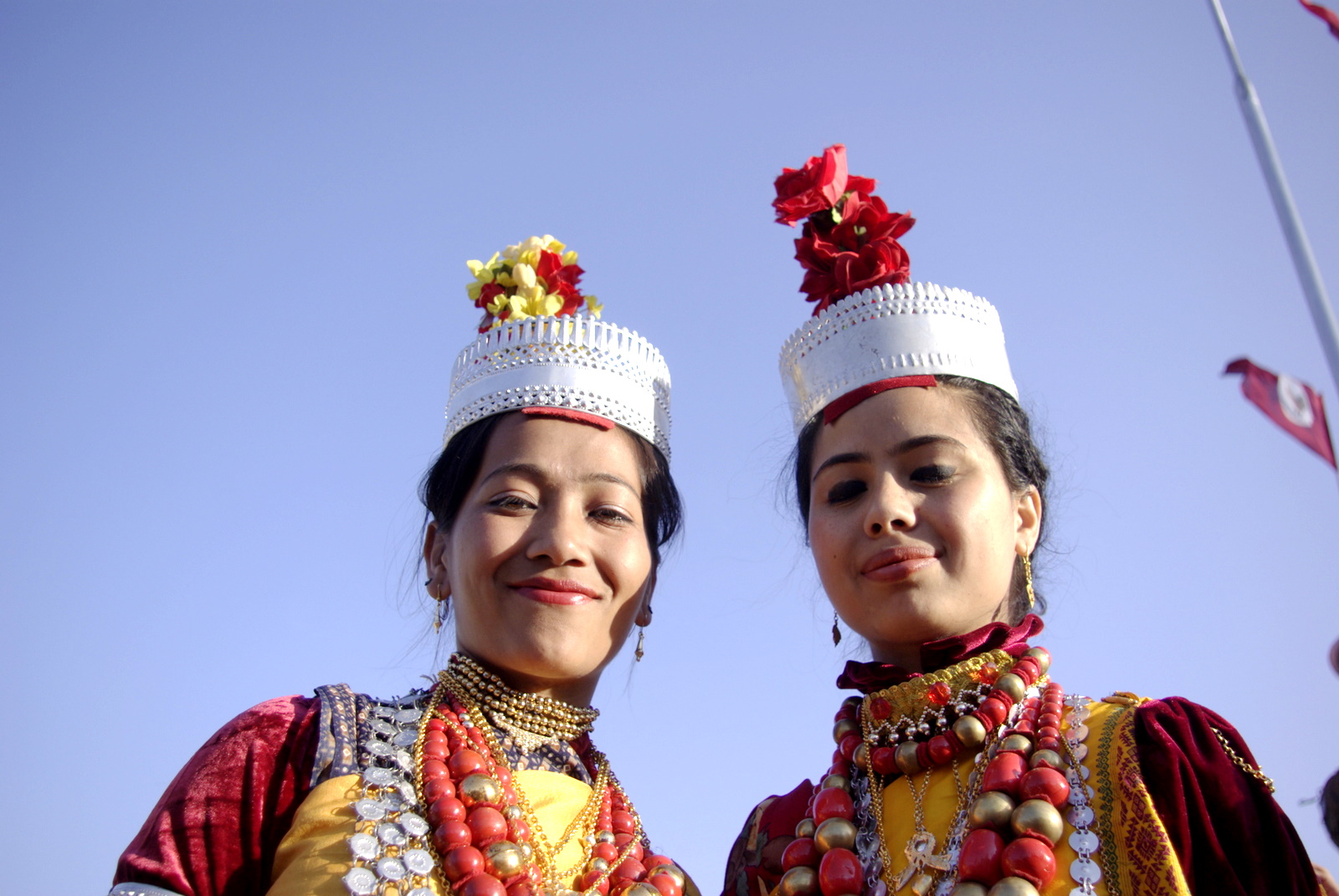
- Khasi women in traditional dress

Total population
- 1,512,831

Regions with significant populations
- India: 1,427,711
- Meghalaya: 1,382,278
- Assam: 34,558
- Bangladesh: 30,000

Languages
- Khasi

Religion
- Majority: Christianity (Catholic & Protestant); Significant: Ka Niam Khasi, Minority: Hinduism, Buddhism and Islam

Related ethnic groups
- Jaintia people and other Mon–Khmers

The Khasi people are an Austroasiatic ethnic group of Meghalaya in north-eastern India with a significant population in the bordering state of Assam and in certain parts of Bangladesh. The Khasis constitute the majority population in the eastern part of Meghalaya, particularly in the Khasi Hills, where they represent 78.3% of the region's population. They also comprise about 48% of Meghalaya's total population, making them the state's largest ethnic community. They are among the few Austroasiatic-speaking peoples in South Asia. The Khasi tribe holds the distinction of being one of the few remaining tribes that have a matrilineal society. Under the Constitution of India, the Khasis have been granted the status of Scheduled Tribe.

== History ==
=== Khasi mythology ===
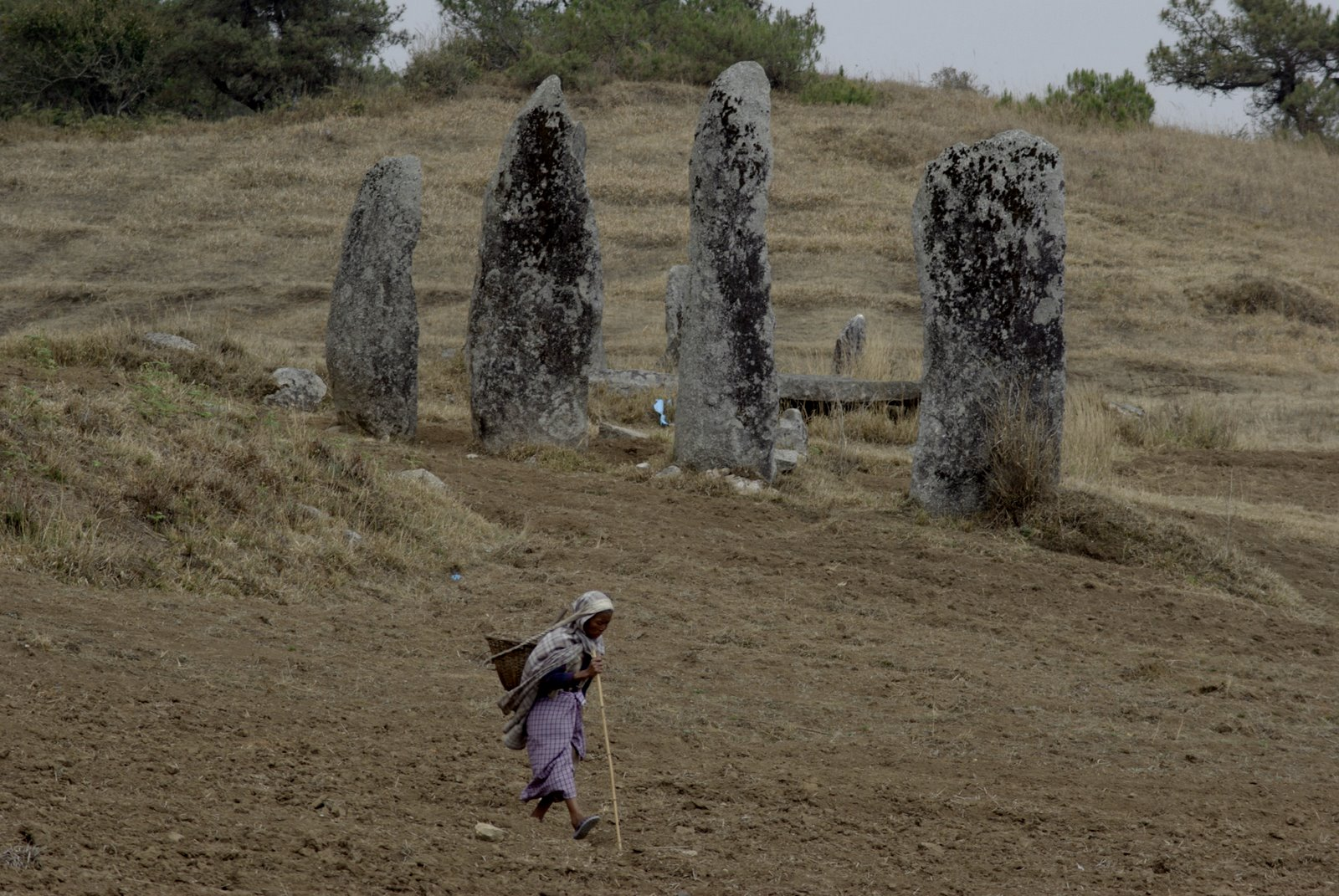
Khasi women and standing-stones, near Laitlyngkot, Meghalaya, India

Khasi mythology traces the tribe's original abode to 'Ki Hynñiewtrep ("The Seven Huts"). According to the Khasi mythology, U Blei Trai Kynrad (God, the Lord Master) had originally distributed the human race into 16 heavenly families (Khadhynriew Trep). However, seven out of these 16 families were stuck on earth while the other 9 reside in heaven. According to the myth, a heavenly ladder resting on the sacred Lum Sohpetbneng Peak (located in the present-day Ri-Bhoi district) enabled people to go freely and frequently to heaven whenever they pleased until one day they were tricked into cutting a divine tree which was situated at Lum Diengiei Peak (also in present-day East Khasi Hills district), a grave error which prevented them access to the heavens forever. This myth is often seen as a metaphor of how nature and trees, in particular, are the manifestation of the divine on Earth and destroying nature and trees means severing our ties with the Divine. Like the Japanese, the Khasis use the rooster as a symbol because they believe that it was he who aroused God and also humbly paved and cleared the path for God to create the Universe at the beginning of time. The rooster is the symbol of morning marking a new beginning and a new sunrise.

Khasian is closely related to Palaungic language of Myanmar. Pre-Khasian migrated through Upper Burma to Brahmaputra Valley on the way to Meghalaya.

=== Language ===
The Khasi language is classified as part of the Austroasiatic language family. According to Peter Wilhelm Schmidt, the Khasi people are related to the Mon-Khmer people of Southeast Asia. Multiple types of research indicate that the Austroasiatic populations in the Indian subcontinent are derived from migrations from Southeast Asia during the Holocene period. Many of the words are similar to other Austroasiatic languages such as Palaung and Khmer language:

Comparison between Khasi, Khmer, and Vietnamese
Meaning	Khasi	Khmer	Vietnamese	Notes
Tiger	khla	khla	hổ, cọp	
To fly	her	haer	bay	
Belly	kpoh	poh	bụng	
New	thymme, thymmai	thmei, thmai	mới	
Year	snem	chnem	năm	
Leaf	sla, 'la	slaek	lá	
Crab	tham	ktam	dam, đam	
Hand	kti, 'ti	tai	tay	
Finger or toe	pream	mream	ngón	
Children	khun, khon, kon	kaun, kon	con	
Birds	sim	_	chim	
Eyes	khmat, 'mat	phnek	mắt	
Fish	dohkha	kaa- (prefix)	cá	
Mother	mei	mae	mẹ	mea in Thai
Rice	khaw	sraw, angkhor	gạo	khaw in Thai
Python	thlen	thlan	trăn	

There are also words similar to those in Sino-Tibetan languages, such as nga meaning "I", which is the same in Tibetan, Burmese, and Old Chinese as it is in Khasi. Traces of connections with the Kachin tribe of North Myanmar have also been in the Khasis. The Khasi people also have their own word for the Himalayan mountains which is Ki Lum Mankashang which means that at one point in time, they did cross the mighty mountains. Therefore, all these records and their present culture, features, and language strongly show that they also have a strong Tibeto-Himalayan-Burman influence. The word "Khas" means hills and they have always been people of cold and hilly regions and have never been connected to the plains or arid regions. This nature-loving tribe calls the wettest place on Earth their home. The village of Mawsynram in Meghalaya receives 467 inches of rain per year.

Primarily an oral language, they had no script of their own, until the arrival of the Welsh missionaries. The Welsh missionaries originally used the Bengali script before resorting to the Roman script to transcribe the Sohra dialect of the Khasi language. Particularly significant in this regard was a Welsh evangelist, Thomas Jones.

=== Modern times ===
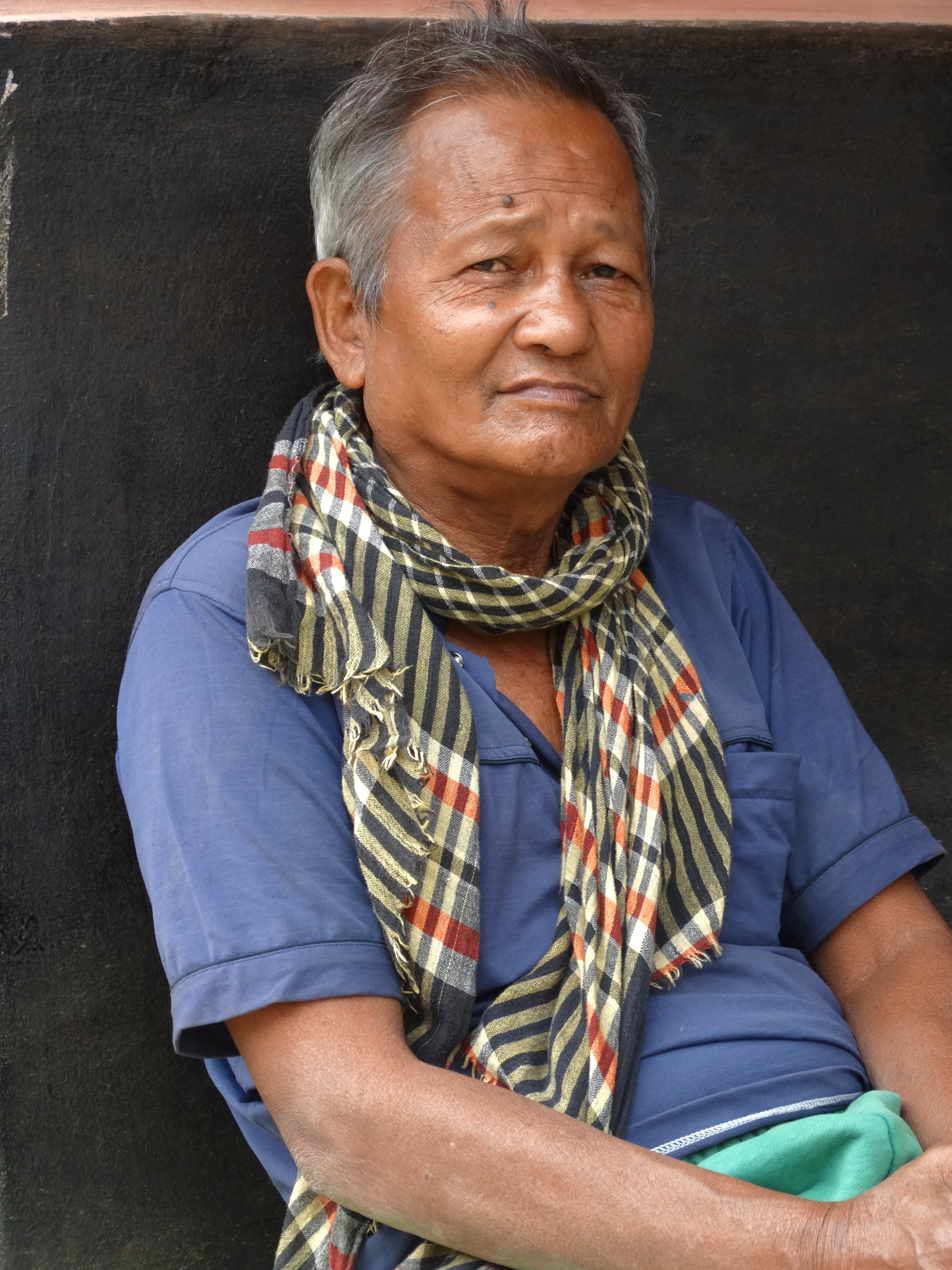
Khasi man in Sreemangal, Bangladesh

The Khasi first came in contact with the British in 1823, after the latter captured Assam. The area inhabited by the Khasi became a part of the Assam Province after the Khasi Hill States (which numbered to about 25 kingdoms) entered into a subsidiary alliance with the British.

The main crops produced by the Khasi people are betel leaves, areca nut, oranges, pineapples, plums, litchis, local varieties of rice and vegetables.

== Geographical distribution and sub-groups ==
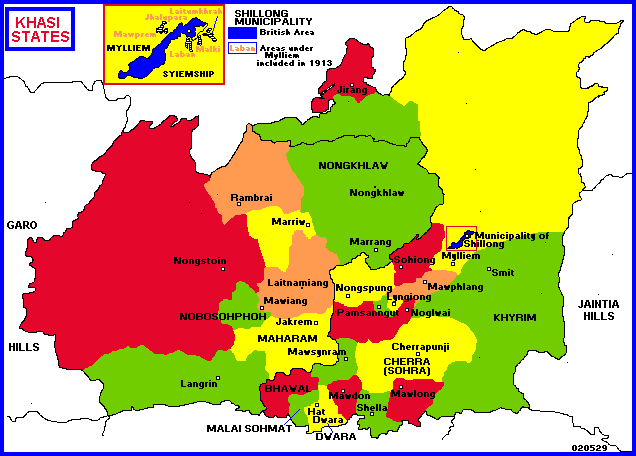
Khasi states, 1947

Many Khasi sociologists classify the Khasi tribe in the following seven sub-tribes, which are collectively also known as 'U Hynñiewtrep' or 'Khasi':

- Khynriam (or Nongphlang): inhabit the uplands of the East Khasi Hills district.
- Pnar (or Synteng) live in the uplands of the Jaintia Hills district.
- Bhoi live in the lower hills to the north and north-east of the Khasi and Jaintia Hills towards the Brahmaputra valley in a vast area in Ri-Bhoi district.
- War subdivided into War-Jaintia and War-Khynriam tribes live on the steep southern slopes of Khasi Hills leading to Bangladesh.
- Maram inhabit the uplands of the central parts of West Khasi Hills District.
- Lyngngam inhabit the western parts of the West Khasi Hills district bordering the Garo Hills display linguistic and cultural characteristics which show influences from both the Khasis to their east and the Garo people to the west.
- Diko are extinct group who once inhabited the lowlands of the West Khasi Hills District.

According to the 2011 Census of India, over 1.41 million Khasi lived in Meghalaya in the districts of East Khasi Hills, West Khasi Hills, South West Khasi Hills, Eastern West Khasi Hills, Ri-Bhoi, West Jaintia Hills and East Jaintia Hills which togetherly constitute the Eastern part of Meghalaya's Khasi and Jaintia Hills region. In Assam, their population reached 35 thousand. In Bangladesh's Sylhet Division specially in Jaflong, around 85 thousand Khasis are living there.

Khasi inhabiting the northern part are known as Bhoi, as that area is often called Ri Bhoi. People in the east are known as the Pnar, and they call their land Rilum Jaintia. The south are called War or Ri War, because of its mountainous regions and soil fertility. The west has a number of regional names: Maram, Rimen, Khatsawphra, Mawiang, Lyngam. A Khasi who inhabits the central area is known as Khynriam. The War inhabitants of the Khasi community designed and built living root bridges of the War region.

== Dress ==
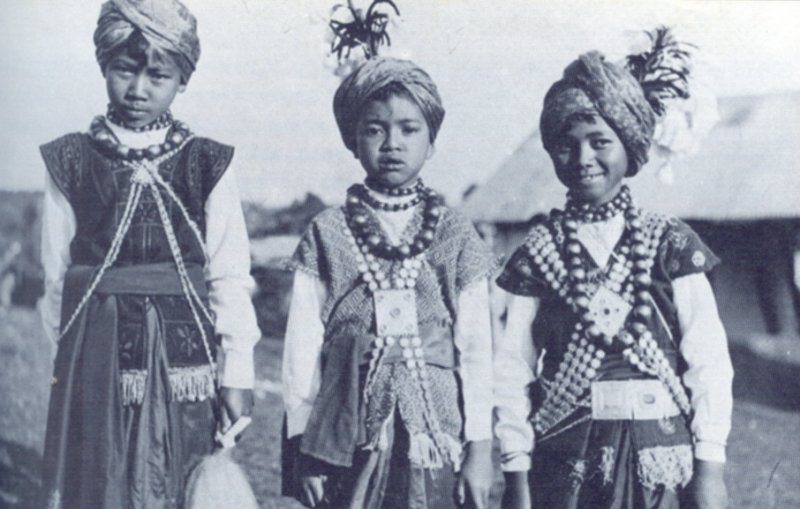
Khasi children, 1944

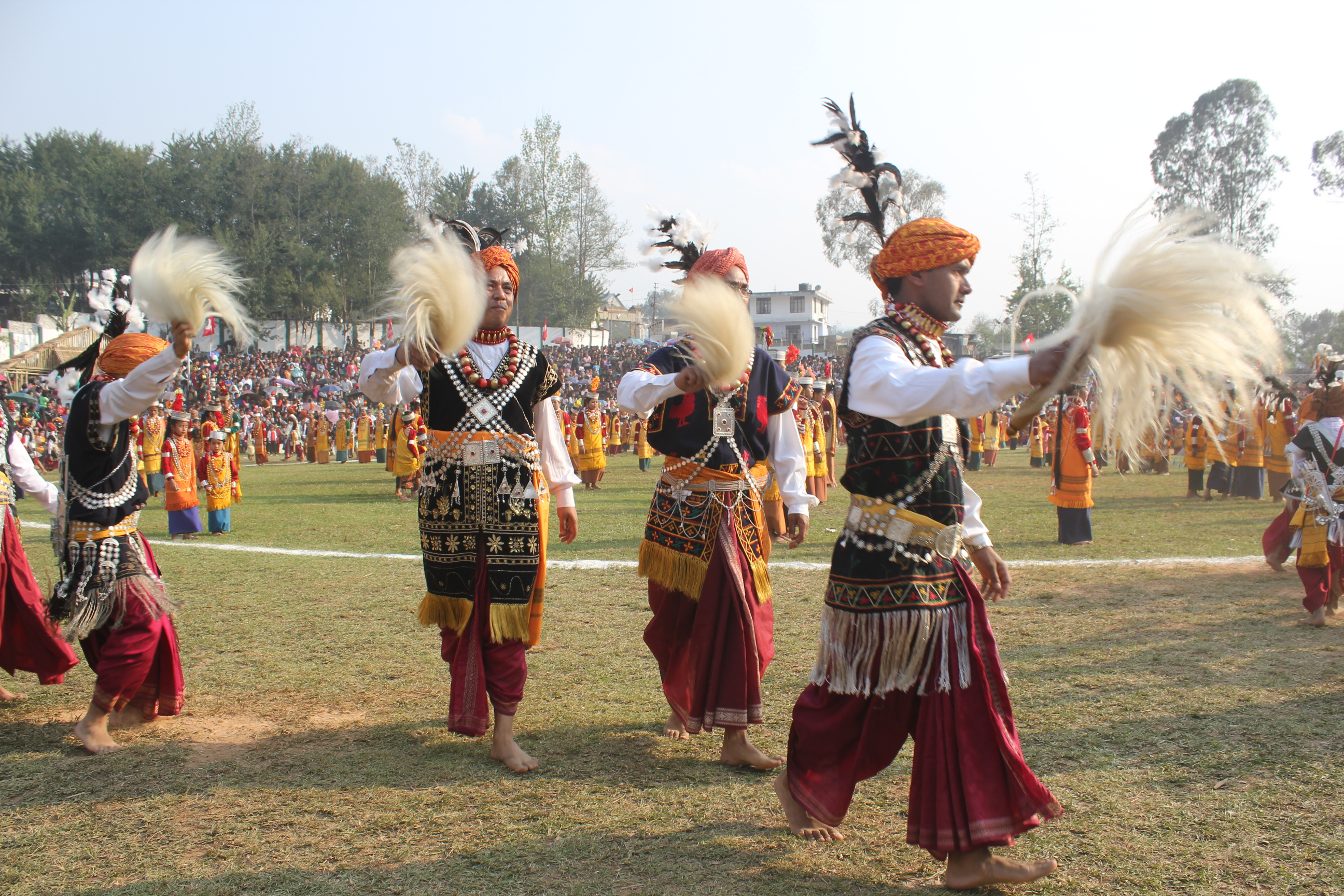
Dancers during the festival of Shad Suk Mynsiem in Shillong

The traditional costume of the Khasis is known to be 'i shongkun bad i Don burom" which translates to being grand/respectful and modest.

The traditional Khasi male dress is a Jymphong, a longish sleeveless coat without collar, fastened by thongs in front. Nowadays, most male Khasis have adopted western attire. On ceremonial occasions they appear in a Jymphong and sarong with an ornamental waist-band and they may also wear a turban.

The traditional Khasi female dress is called the Jainsem or Dhara, both of which are rather elaborate with several pieces of cloth, giving the body a cylindrical shape. On ceremonial occasions, they may wear a crown of silver or gold. A spike or peak is fixed to the back of the crown, corresponding to the feathers worn by the menfolk. The Jainsem consists of two pieces of material fastened at each shoulder. The "Dhara" consists of a single piece of material also fastened at each shoulder.

Weaving Ryndia is an art passed down through the generations and treated as an occupation, providing livelihood to families in the region. Traditionally a hand-spun, hand-woven fabric, worn with pride by both the men and women in Meghalaya, the fabric in its un-dyed off-white state, or maroon and mustard plaid design, is a cultural symbol of the Khasi people. Eri silk is also known as 'peace silk' as the production process is considered to be non-violent. Weaving is primarily done by women. Eri silk in Meghalaya is produced from start to finish by women working from home or in clusters.

== Marriage ==
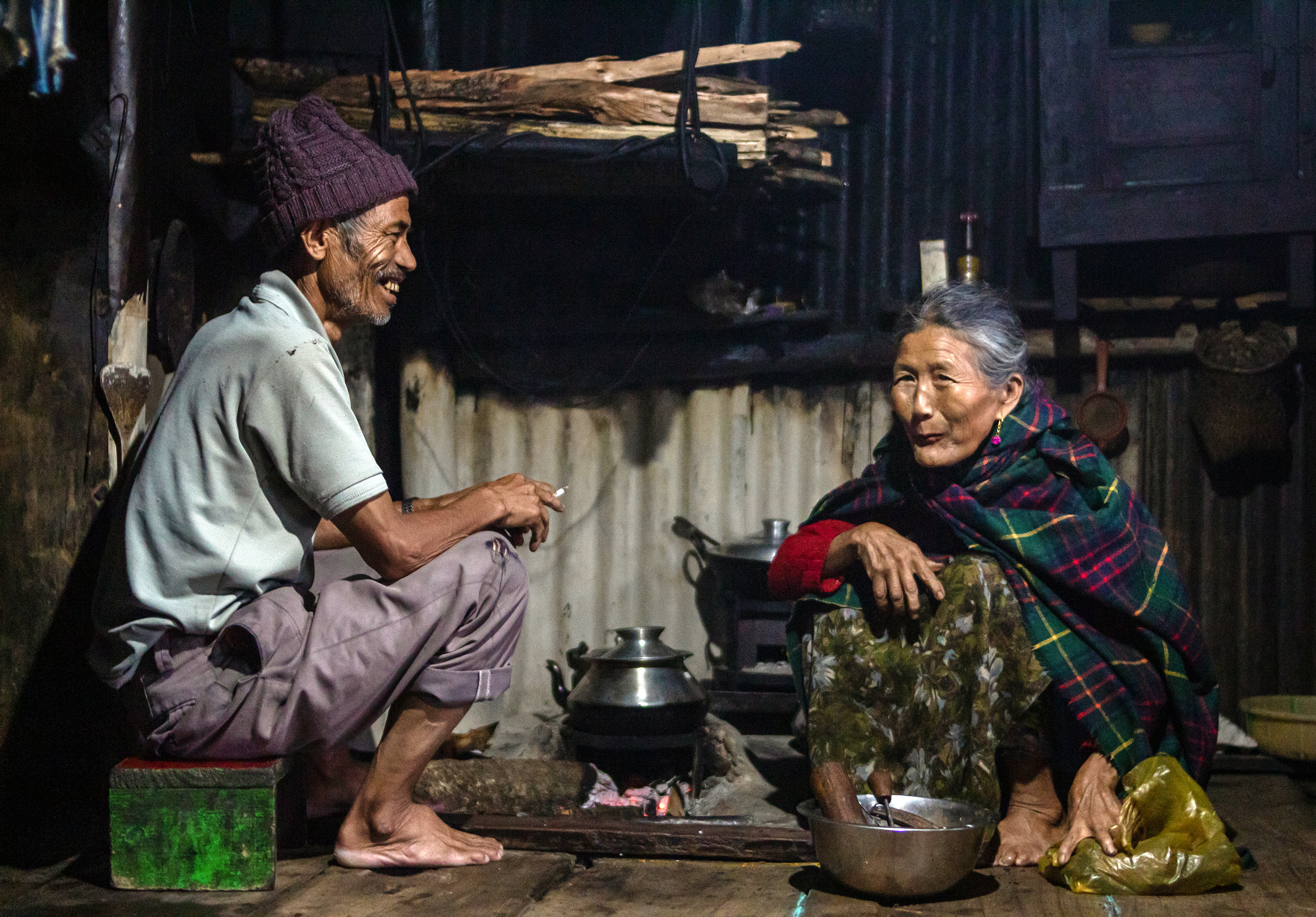
An elderly Khasi married couple

The Khasis are, for the most part, monogamous. Young men and women are permitted considerable freedom in the choice of partners. Potential marriage partners are likely to have met before betrothal. Once a man has selected his desired spouse, he reports his choice to his parents. They then secure the services of a mediator to make the arrangements with the woman's family (provided that the man's clan agree with his choice). The parents of the woman ascertain her wishes and if she agrees to the arrangement her parents check to make certain that the man to be wed is not a member of their clan (since Khasi clans are exogamous, marital partners may not be from the same clan). If this is satisfactory then a wedding date is set.

Divorce is relatively common, with causes ranging from incompatibility to lack of offspring. This ceremony traditionally consists of the husband handing the wife 5 cowries or paisa which the wife then hands back to her husband along with 5 of her own. The husband then throws these away or gives them to a village elder who throws them away. Present-day Khasis divorce through the Indian legal system.

The type of marriage is the determining factor in the marital residence. In short, post marital residence for a married man when an heiress (known as Ka Khadduh or "The Youngest daughter in the family") is involved must be matrilocal (that is, in his mother-in-law's house), while post-marital residence when a non-heiress is involved is neolocal. Traditionally (though nowadays this rule is not absolutely true), a Khasi man returns to his Iing-Kur (maternal home) upon the death of his spouse (if she is a Khadduh and they both have no children). These practices are the result of rules governing inheritance and property ownership. These rules are themselves related to the structure of the Khasi Kur (clan system).

== Onomastics ==
Khasi names are known for their originality and elaborate nature and often literal nature. The given names may be invented by parents for their children, and these can be based on traditional native names, Christian names, or other English words. The family names, which they call "surnames", remain in the native Khasi languages or its dialects.

== Traditional politics ==
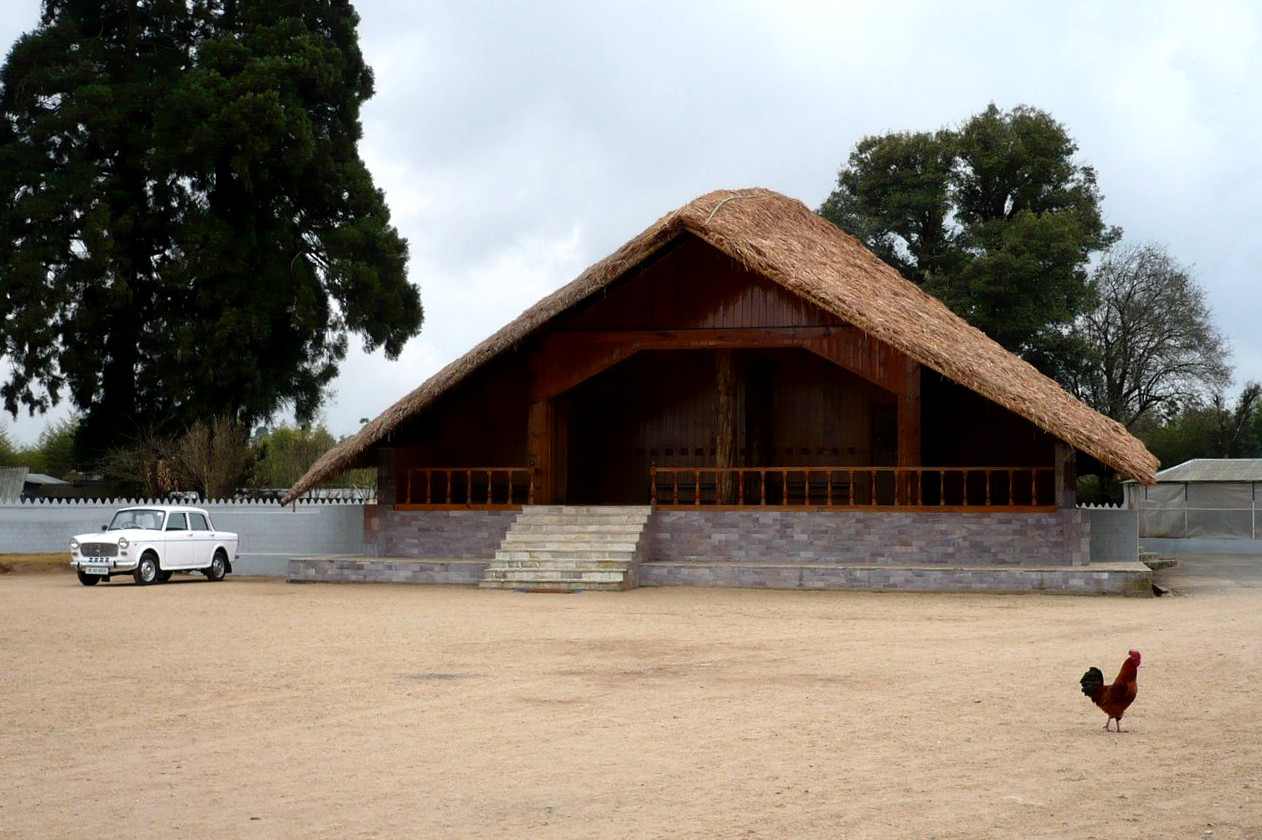
The royal seat of Khyrim at Smit

The traditional political structure of the Khasi community is democratic in nature. In the past, the Khasis consisted of independent native states called Syiemships, where male elders of various clans under the leadership of the Chief (called U Syiem) would congregate during Durbars or sessions and come to a decision regarding any dispute or problem that would arise in the Syiemship. At the village level, there exists a similar arrangement where all the residents of the village or town come together under the leadership of an elected Headman (called U Rangbah Shnong) to decide on matters pertaining to the locality. This system of village administration is much like the Panchayati Raj prevalent in most Indian States. There were around 25 independent native states on record which were annexed and acceded to the Indian Union. The Syiems of these native states (called Hima) were traditionally elected by the people or ruling clans of their respective domains. Famous among these Syiemships are Hima Mylliem, Hima Khyrim, Hima Nongkhlaw, amongst others. These Syiemships continue to exist and function till today under the purview of the Khasi Hills Autonomous District Council (KHADC), which draws its legal power and authority from the Sixth Schedule of the Constitution of India.

== Religion ==
Religion among Khasis (2011 census)
Religion	Meghalaya	
Religion	Population	%
Christians	1,173,693	83.14%
Niam Khasi	217,488	15.41%
Hindus	10,302	0.73%
Buddhists	1,803	0.12%
Muslims	1,689	0.11%
Atheists	6,800	0.49%
Total	1,411,775	100%

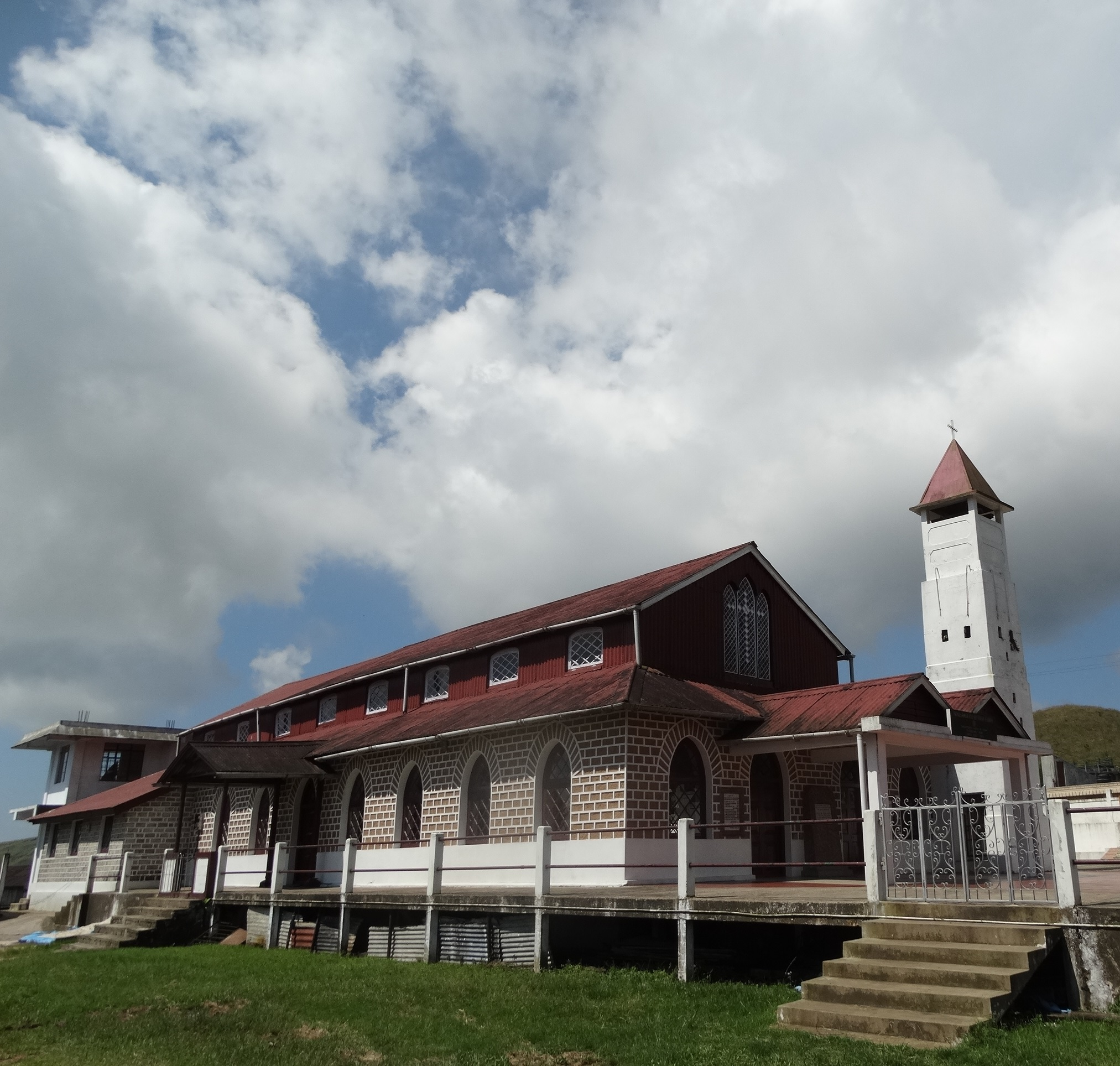
Nongsawlia Presbyterian Church, East Khasi hills district.

Before the arrival of Christian missionaries and post- conversion, almost all of the Khasi people practised an indigenous tribal religion. The first translation of the Bible into any of the languages of Northeast India was a Khasi version, published in 1891 by missionaries. The main Christian denominations today followed among the Khasis include Catholicism, Anglicanism, Presbyterianism (largest Christian denomination among the Khasis), and others. Around 83.14% of the Khasi tribe numbering around 1.17 million are Christian of various denominations (mainly Presbyterian and Catholic) and 15.41% of them numbering around 217,000 still follow their Indigenous khasi religion called "Ka Niam Khasi" which is monotheistic in nature. In Khasi traditional religion Niam Khasi, the principal deity U Blei Nongthaw, who is One and formless is the Supreme creator of the whole universe.

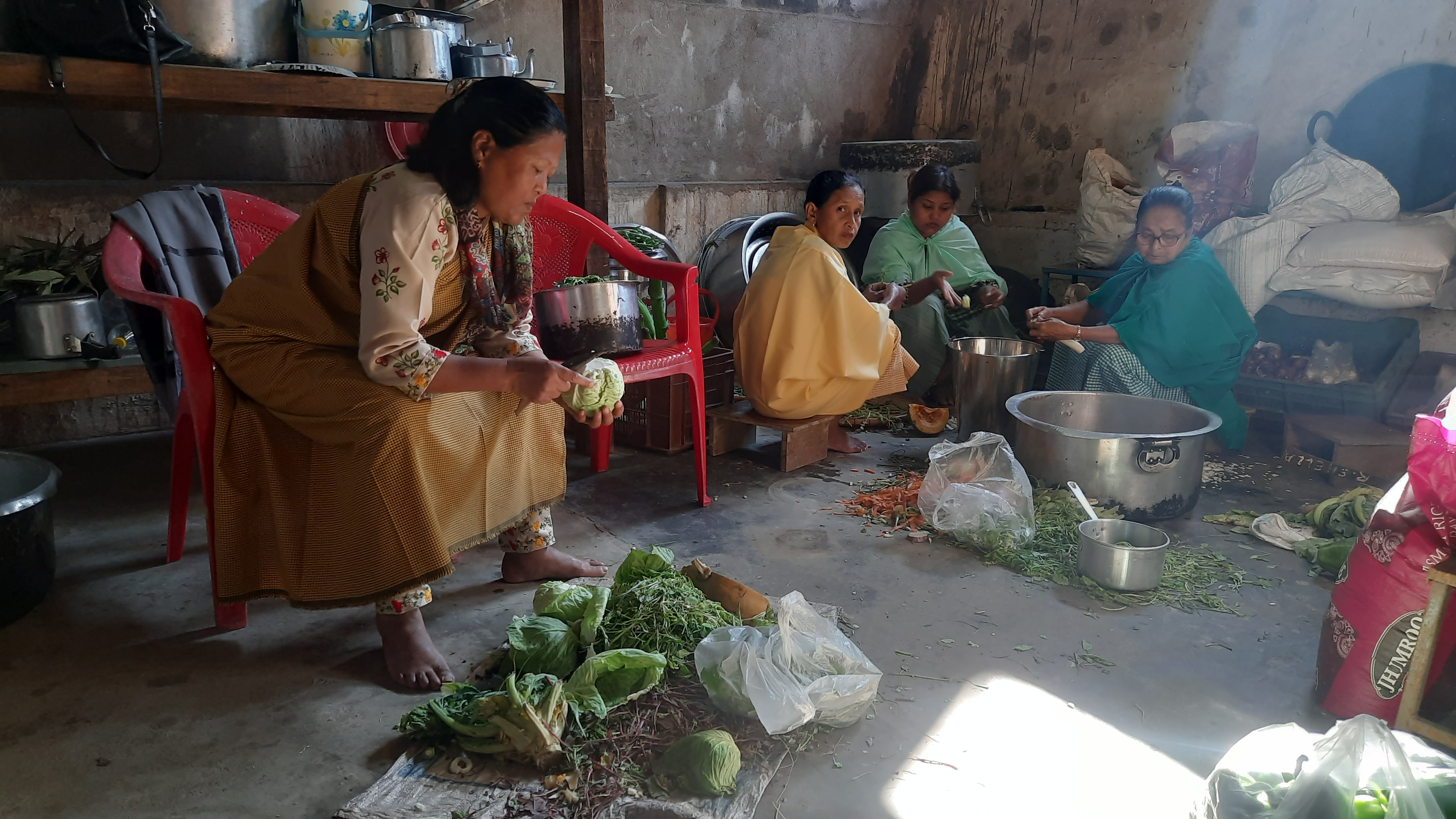
Khasi devotees making bhog for Durga Puja, a Hindu festival, at Shella.

A significant small number of Khasi population also adheres to Hindu and Buddhist faith. As per as 2011 census, around 10.3 thousands Khasi people have stated their religion as Hindu and Around 1.8 thousand Khasis follow Buddhism. Lesli Hardinge Pde, a 73-year-old retired Meghalaya civil servant, who is also an Khasi actor, comedian have translated Bhagavad Gita into Khasi language, locally known as "The Song of God or in Khasi, Ka Jingrwai U Blei". The book was published on 9 May 2011. The author have also translated the Ramayana, the Mahabharata and the Upanishads into Khasi. Historians suggested that the Kamakhya temple of Assam's Nilachal Hills was an ancient sacrificial site for an Austroasiatic tribal goddess, locally called or known as "Ka Mei Kha" (literally: old-cousin-mother), of the Khasi tribe supported by the folk lores of these very peoples. The traditional accounts from Kalika Purana of (10th century) and the Yogini Tantra too recorded that the goddess Kamakhya is of Kirata origin, and It is said that the worship of Kamakhya goddess predates the establishment of Kamarupa in (4th century CE).

There is also very small community of Khasi Muslims, mostly residing in Shillong and adjoining areas of the city, who accepted Sunni Islam as a result of historic Muslim traders in the region. On 3 February 2019, Quran, Islamic Holy Book, was released in the Khasi language. The translation of 1251 pre-pages and pages of Quran, was done by a Khasi Muslim leader Mubarak Lyngdoh, to propagates Islam among the local Khasis. The translation was done at the initiative of the Seng Bhalang Islam (A local Islamic organisation of Shillong, Meghalaya). Khasi Muslims numbers around 1,689 as per 2011 census.

There are also a small segment of Khasi population who do not follow any particular faith. Around 6.8 thousand Khasis have stated that they are atheist and do not believe in any particular religion or God as per 2011 census.

== Fertility rate ==
According to a 1998-99 research by the National Family Health Survey of India (NFHS), the Khasi tribe, along with Jaintia and Garo had the highest fertility in India at TFR=4.57.

== Notable people ==
- Sniawbhalang Dhar, Deputy Chief minister of Meghalaya
- Aiborlang Khongjee, Indian footballer
- Bonily Khongmen, Indian politician from the Indian National Congress party, Former member of Lok Sabha
- Paty Ripple Kyndiah, Indian politician
- Rocus Lamare, Indian footballer
- D. D. Lapang, former Chief minister of Meghalaya
- Ampareen Lyngdoh, politician
- Eugeneson Lyngdoh, Indian footballer
- James Michael Lyngdoh, former Chief Election Commissioner of India
- Paul Lyngdoh, politician
- U Kiang Nangbah, freedom fighter
- Neil Nongkynrih, director of the Shillong Chamber Choir
- Keishing Clifford Nongrum, MVC, Mahavir Chakra awardee (posthumously)
- Sayeedullah Nongrum, Khasi philanthropist and three-time MLA
- Donkupar Roy, former chief minister of Meghalaya
- J. J. M. Nichols Roy (Rev. James Joy Mohan Nichols Roy) member of the Constituent Assembly of India, pioneer of the Sixth Schedule of the Constitution of India "which established autonomous district councils in tribal areas in the north-east"
- J. D. Rymbai, former Chief minister of Meghalaya
- Ricky Shabong, Indian footballer
- U Tirot Sing, freedom fighter
- George Gilbert Swell, former Deputy Speaker of the Lok Sabha and Ambassador to Norway and Burma
- Silverine Swer, Indian social and environmental activist, educationist and civil servant.
- David R. Syiemlieh, former chairman, Union Public Service Commission (UPSC)
- Skendrowell Syiemlieh, Khasi folk singer and Padmashree awardee.
- Prestone Tynsong, Deputy Chief minister of Meghalaya

== See also ==
- Khasi pine
- Tirot Sing
- Anglo-Khasi War
- Tungrymbai

== Sources ==
- Hasnain, Nadeem (2021) [First published 1983]. Tribal India (7th ed.). Delhi: Palaka Prakashan. ISBN 978-81-85799-61-2.
- Sidwell, Paul (2021). "AUSTROASIATIC DISPERSAL: THE AA "WATER-WORLD" EXTENDED. WERE THE PROTO-AUSTROASIATICS COASTAL MIGRANTS?". Journal of the Southeast Asian Linguistics Society. 15 (3): 65–72. hdl:10524/52498.
- Chaubey; et al. (2011), "Population Genetic Structure in Indian Austroasiatic Speakers: The Role of Landscape Barriers and Sex-Specific Admixture", Mol Biol Evol, 28 (2): 1013–1024, doi:10.1093/molbev/msq288, PMC 3355372, PMID 20978040
- van Driem, George L. (2007b), Austroasiatic phylogeny and the Austroasiatic homeland in light of recent population genetic studies (PDF), archived from the original on 3 March 2016
- Ness, Immanuel (2014), The Global Prehistory of Human Migration, The Global Prehistory of Human Migration
- Sharma, M M (1990), "Religion", in Barpujari, H K (ed.), The Comprehensive History of Assam: Ancient Period, vol. I, Guwahati: Publication Board, Assam, pp. 302–345
- Shin, Jae-Eun (2010). "Yoni, Yoginis and Mahavidyas: Feminine Divinities from Early Medieval Kamarupa to Medieval Koch Behar". Studies in History. 26 (1): 1–29. doi:10.1177/025764301002600101. S2CID 155252564.
- Urban, Hugh (2009), The Power of Tantra: Religion, Sexuality and the Politics of South Asian Studies, Bloomsbury Publishing, ISBN 978-0-85771-586-9
- Zhang; et al. (2015), "Y-chromosome diversity suggests southern origin and Paleolithic backwave migration of Austro-Asiatic speakers from eastern Asia to the Indian subcontinent", Scientific Reports, 5 15486, Bibcode:2015NatSR...515486Z, doi:10.1038/srep15486, PMC 4611482, PMID 26482917
