= Tirot Sing =

Khasi chief

Tirot Singh
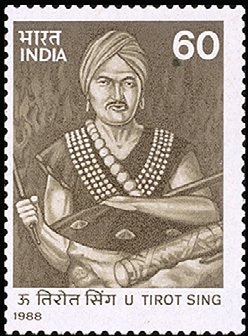
- Indian Postage stamp of U Tirot Sing
- Born: c. 1802; Mairang, Meghalaya, India
- Died: 17 July 1835 (aged 32–33); Dacca, British India
- Known for: Freedom struggle against the British
- Office: Chief of Khadsawphra Syiemship, Khasi Hills, Meghalaya

Tirot Singh, also known as U Tirot Sing Syiem, was one of the chiefs of the Khasi people in the early 19th century. He drew his lineage from the Syiemlieh clan. He was Syiem (king) of Nongkhlaw, part of the Khasi Hills. His surname was Syiemlieh. He was a constitutional head sharing corporate authority with his Council, general representatives of the leading clans within his territory. Tirot Sing declared war and fought against the British for attempts to take over control of the Khasi Hills.

He died on 17 July 1835. His death is commemorated in Meghalaya as U Tirot Sing Day.

== Anglo-Khasi War and martyrdom ==
The British had gained control over the Brahmaputra valley after concluding the Treaty of Yandabo in 1826. Between their possessions in Sylhet and the newly acquired possessions in Lower Assam intervened the Khasi Hills. They wanted to construct a road through this area to connect Guwahati with Sylhet to save weeks of travel and malarious country.

David Scott, the agent to the British Governor-General for the Northern Territory, found out that U Tirot Sing was interested in regaining possessions in the duars (passes into Assam) in return for the permission for the road project. After a two-day session of the durbar (court), the assembly agreed to the proposal of the British. Work on the road started. When Balaram Singh, Raja of Ranee, disputed U Tirot Sing's claims to the duars, he went with a party of armed men in December 1828 to establish his claim. He was confident that the British would support him; instead, he was confronted by a party of sepoys who blocked his passage. When news came that the British were reinforcing forces in Assam, U Tirot Sing convened a Durbar again and passed orders for the British to evacuate Nongkhlaw. The British did not pay any heed, and the Khasis attacked the British garrison in Nongkhlaw on 4 April 1829. His men killed at his orders two British officers, Richard Gurdon Bedingfield and Philip Bowles Burlton. In retaliation, British military operations began against U Tirot Sing and other Khasi chiefs.

In the Anglo-Khasi War, the Khasis lacked firearms and had only swords, shields, bows and arrows. They were untrained in the British type of warfare and soon found that it was impossible to engage in open battle against an enemy who could kill from a distance. Therefore, they resorted to guerrilla activity, which dragged on for about four years.

Tirot Sing fought with native weapons such as a sword and shield. He was shot at by the British and had to hide in a cave and tend for his wound. He was eventually captured by the British in January 1833 and deported to Dhaka. The location of his hiding place was given by a chief of his who was bribed with gold coins by the British. He died on 17 July 1835. His death anniversary is commemorated every year as a state holiday in Meghalaya.

== See also ==
- Khasi language
- List of Indian independence activists
- Meghalaya
- North-East India
