= U Kiang Nangbah =

Jaiñtia freedom fighter

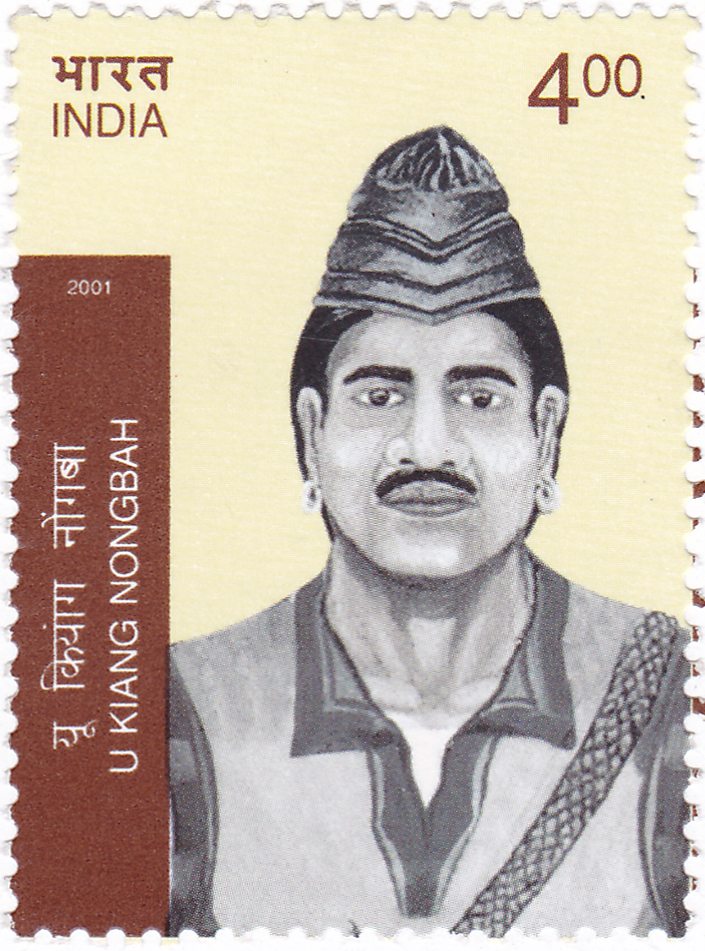
U Kiang Nangbah on a 2001 stamp of India

U Kiang Nangbah was a Jaiñtia freedom fighter from Meghalaya who led an uprising against the British. He was hanged by the British publicly at Iawmusiang in Jowai town in West Jaintia Hills district on 30 December 1862. A postage stamp was issued by Government of India to commemorate him in 2001. A government college was also opened at Jowai in 1967 in his honour. He was born at Tpeppale Jowai after annexation of the Brahamaputra Valley.
