= Anglo-Khasi War =

The Anglo-Khasi War was part of the independence struggle between the Khasi people and the British Empire between the years 1829-1833. The war started with Tirot Sing's attack on a British garrison that disobeyed orders of this Khasi King to stop a road and sanatorium construction project through the Khasi Hills. The Khasis were defeated in this war and the British gained supremacy over these hills.

== See also ==
- Khasi
- Tirot Sing
- Meghalaya
- North-East India
- Indian History
- British East India Company
