= Langshiang Falls =

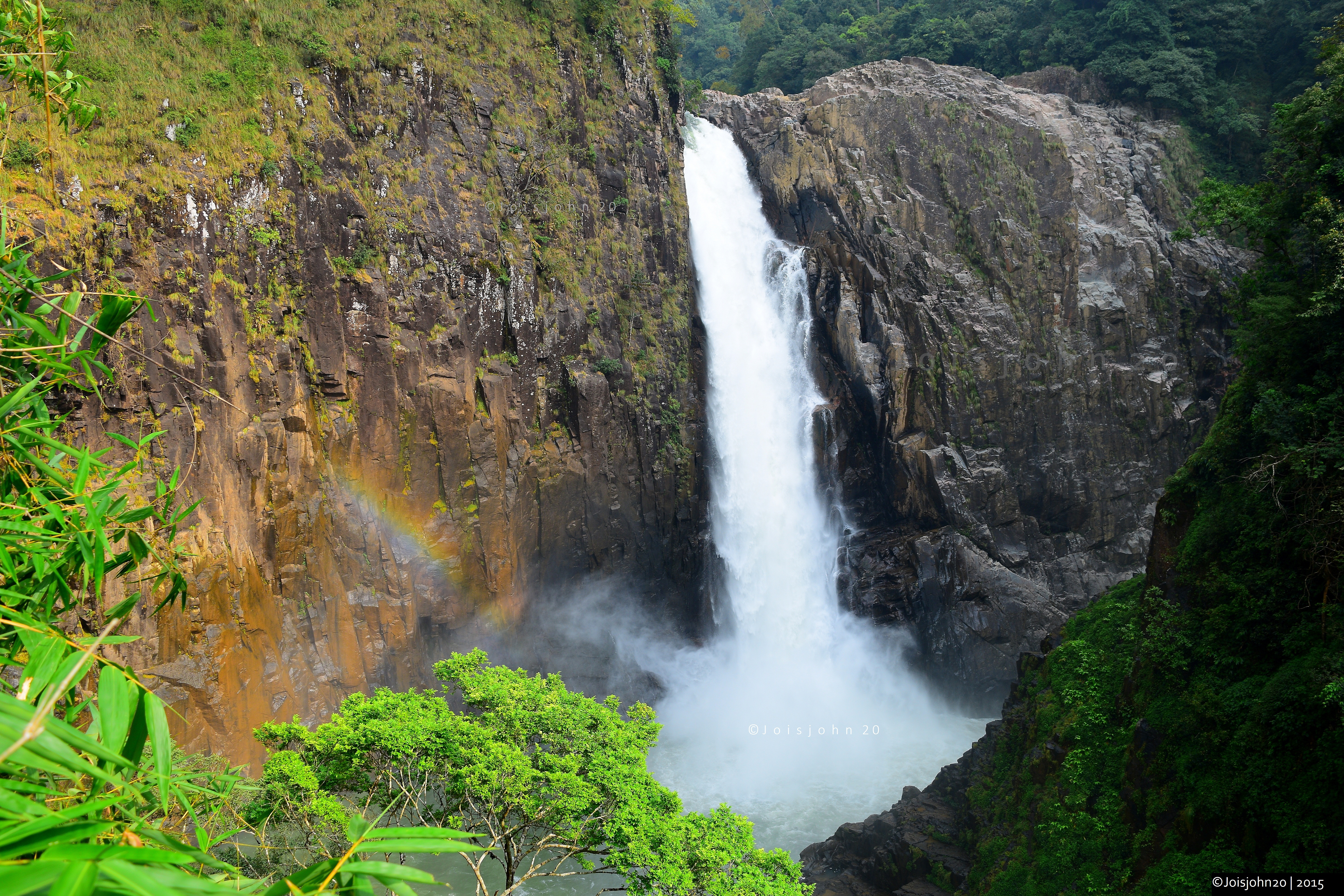
- Langshiang Falls

- Location within Meghalaya Location within India
- Location: West Khasi Hills district, Meghalaya, India
- Coordinates: 25°26′43″N 91°13′43″E
- Type: Plunge
- Total height: 337 metres (1,106 ft)
- Number of drops: 1
- Watercourse: Kynshi River

The Langshiang Falls is located near the village of Sangriang, 24 kilometres (15 mi) from Nongstoin, in West Khasi Hills district in the Indian state of Meghalaya. It can also be seen from Mawpon village.

The total height of the falls is generally quoted at around 337 metres (1,106 ft). However, that needs to be confirmed. Considering the height to be correct, it is the 47th highest waterfall in India.

Langshiang, about 24-25 km from Nongstoin, is around a 30 minute walk from Sangriang village. The Mighty Kynshi River after splitting and forms the 2nd largest River Island in Asia meets somewhere on the upstream side of Langchong (Langshiang) area. The river passes through a valley and forms a pool called ‘Wei Spi’ and is surrounded by breathtaking giant cliff. The river then diverts downstream to a deep gorge, forming one of the highest and biggest waterfall in the state, popularly known as the ‘Langshiang Falls’ or ‘kshaid Ur-Nar’. It offers one of the best panoramic views of the green lawn hills nearby and surrounding by hamlets including the village of Mawpon. Langchong consist of some falls. Closer to wei spi, there are two waterfalls called the ‘kshaid chong’ falls and ‘wei spi’ falls. As the river flows downstream, it goes through deep gorge and there is an upcoming project known as the Kynshi HEP. The project will significantly enhance development and secondary benefits like boost to tourism.

== See also ==
- List of waterfalls
- List of waterfalls in India
- List of waterfalls in India by height
- Nohsngithiang Falls
