= Lyngngam language =

Language of Northeast India

Lyngngam
- Lyngam
- Native to: India
- Region: Meghalaya, Assam
- Ethnicity: Lyngngam
- Native speakers: 11,586 (2011 census)
- Language family: Austroasiatic: Khasi-Palaungic; Khasic; Khasi-Pnar-Lyngngam; Lyngngam

Language codes
- ISO 639-3: lyg
- Glottolog: lyng1241

Lyngngam is an Austroasiatic language of Northeast India closely related to Khasic languages. Once listed as a dialect of Khasi, Lyngngam has in recent literature been classified as a distinct language and believed to be former Garo speakers. Lyngngam speakers have food and dress similar to the neighboring Garo people, who consider the ancestors of speakers of the Lyngngam language to belong to the Garo Megam tribe. Some speakers of Lyngngam still use surnames which originate from the Garo language.

== Phonology ==
=== Consonants ===
The following table lists the consonants attested in Lyngngam.

		Bilabial	Alveolar	Palatal	Velar	Glottal
Nasal		m	n	ɲ	ŋ	
Stop	voiceless	p	t	c	k	ʔ
Stop	aspirated	pʰ	tʰ	cʰ	kʰ	
Stop	voiced	b	d	ɟ	ɡ	
Fricative			s			h
Liquid			l, r			
Glide		w		j		

The main difference with the Khasi language is that Lyngngam does not possess the voiced aspirated series. Furthermore, Lyngngam does not have the phoneme ç. Words which have ç in Khasi typically have c or s in Lyngngam, as in the following pairs of cognates:

Lyngngam	Khasi	meaning
cʔeŋ	çʔeŋ	bone
cɨppʰeu	çipʰeu	10
sɲjək	çɲiuʔ	hair
snaːr	çnjaʔ	chisel

=== Vowels ===
The following table lists the vowel inventory of the language. The only vowels showing a length distinction are /i/ and /a/, in contradistinction to Khasi, where length is distinctive for all vowels.

	Front unrounded	Central unrounded	Back rounded
High	/i/,/iː/	/ɨ/	/u/
Mid	/e/	/ə/	/o/
Low	/a/,/aː/		

Words with diphthongs in Khasi have monophthongs in Lyngngam, as in the following pairs of cognates:

Lyngngam	Khasi	meaning
bni	bnaːi	month
ksu	ksəu	dog
mot	miet	night
