= Maharam language =

Austroasiatic language spoken in Meghalaya, India

Maharam
- Maram
- Native to: India
- Region: West Khasi Hills, Meghalaya
- Language family: Austroasiatic: Khasi-Palaungic; Khasic; Khasi-Pnar-Lyngngam; Maharam
- Dialects: Mawranglang; Nobosohpoh

Language codes
- ISO 639-3: None (mis)
- Glottolog: None

Maram, or Maharam, is an Austroasiatic language of Meghalaya, India. It is closely related to Khasi, and is sometimes considered a dialect of that language, though it appears to be more divergent than Khasi is from Pnar.
