= War language =

Austroasiatic language spoken in Bangladesh and India

War
- Waar
- Native to: India, Bangladesh
- Region: Meghalaya (India) and Sylhet (Bangladesh)
- Native speakers: 68,000 (2003-2011 census)
- Language family: Austroasiatic: Khasi-Palaungic; Khasic; War
- Dialects: Amwi

Language codes
- ISO 639-3: aml
- Glottolog: warj1242

War (also known as Waar or War-Jaintia) is an Austroasiatic language in the Khasic branch spoken in Meghalaya in India and Bangladesh. It is spoken by about 51,000 people in India and 16,000 people in Bangladesh.

It is not to be confused with Khasi War, a Khasi dialect spoken by the closely related War-Khyriam.

== See also ==
- Languages of India
