= West Khasi Hills district =

Coordinates: 25.5167°N 91.2667°E

- District of Meghalaya
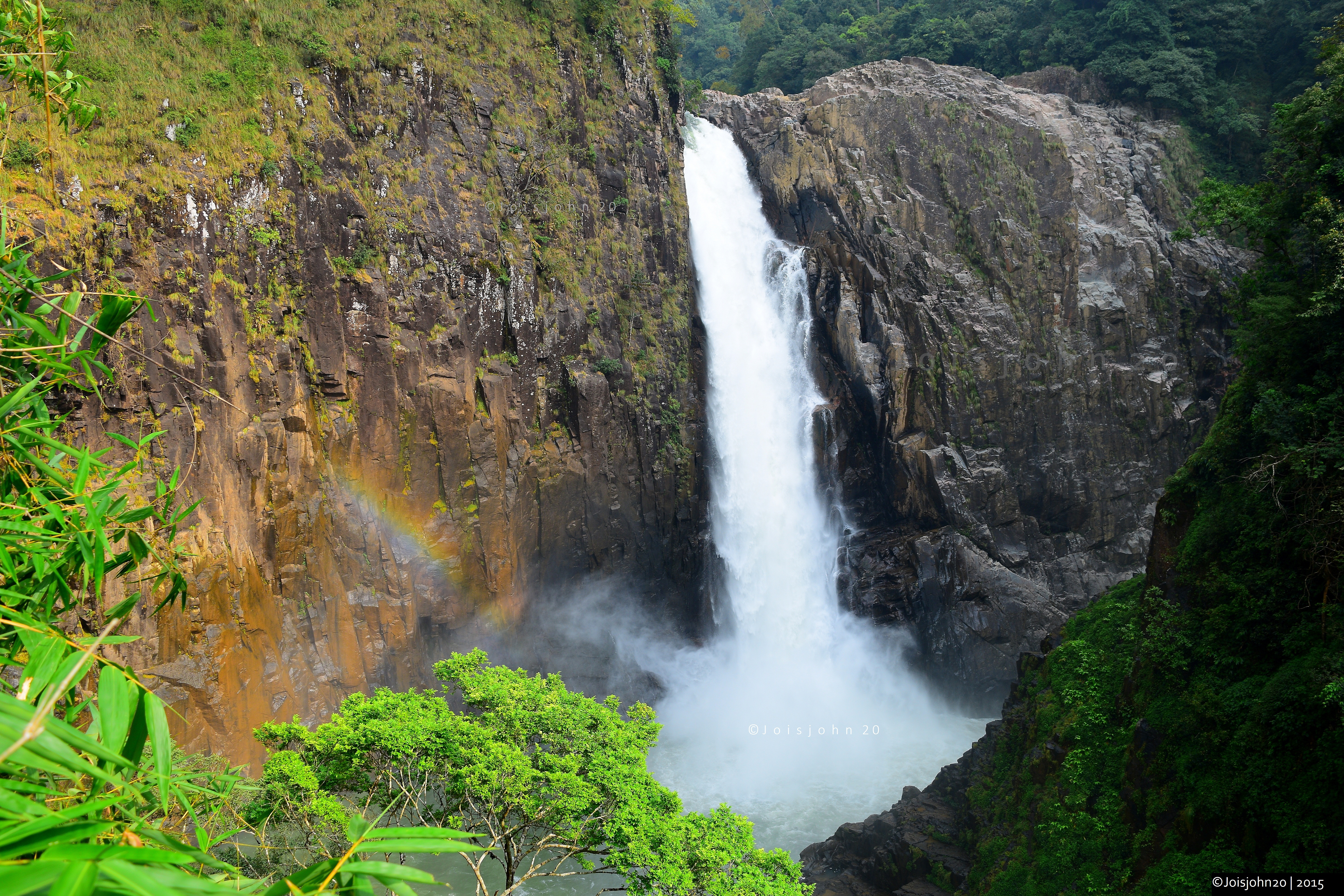
- West Khasi Hills district Location in Meghalaya
- Country: India
- State: Meghalaya
- Headquarters: Nongstoin

Government
  - Vidhan Sabha constituencies: 3

Area
  - Total: 5,247 km^{2} (2,026 sq mi)

Population (2011)
  - Total: 383,461
  - Density: 73.08/km^{2} (189.3/sq mi)

Demographics
  - Literacy: 77.87%
  - Sex ratio: 980
- Time zone: UTC+05:30 (IST)
- Website: westkhasihills.gov.in

West Khasi Hills district is an administrative district in the Indian state of Meghalaya.

== History ==
The West Khasi Hills district was carved out of the Khasi Hills district, which was divided into West and East Khasi Hills districts on 28 October 1976.

== Geography ==
The district headquarters is located at Nongstoin. The district occupies an area of 5247 km^{2}.

== Divisions ==
=== Administrative divisions ===
West Khasi Hills district is divided into four blocks:

Name	Headquarters	Population	Location
Mairang	Mairang		
Mawshynrut	Riangdo		
Mawthadraishan	Nongshillong		
Nongstoin	Nongstoin		

== Demographics ==
According to the 2011 census, West Khasi Hills district has a population of 383,461, roughly equal to the nation of Maldives. This gives it a ranking of 562th in India (out of a total of 640). The district has a population density of 73 inhabitants per square kilometre (190/sq mi). Its population growth rate over the decade 2001-2011 was 30.25%. West Khasi Hills has a sex ratio of 980 females for every 1000 males, and a literacy rate of 77.87%.

The district is predominantly inhabited by Khasi tribe. There is a significance presence of Garo Tribe in the Mawshynrut C and RD Block of West Khasi Hills District.

== Culture ==
Khasi society has greatly been transformed by many factors which have arisen in recent times. Adoption of the Western style of life, especially among the literate and educated, have been quite rapid although the matrilineal laws of inheritance and succession and the other cultural traits are still retained.

=== Places of interest ===
- Langshiang Falls, third-highest waterfalls in India
- Mawthadraishan Peak, second highest peak in Meghalaya
- Nongkhnum River Island, Langshiang Falls, Weinia Falls, Thums Falls
- Umyiap Paddy Field, longest paddy field in northeast India
- Ranikor
- Kyllang Rock
- Rambrai
- Langpih, a village which is the subject of a territorial dispute with neighbouring Kamrup District, Assam
