= Khasi language =

Austroasiatic language of Meghalaya state, India

Khasi
- Ka Ktien Khasi, ক ক্ত্যেন খসি
- Pronunciation: /ka kt̪eːn kʰasi/
- Native to: India
- Region: Meghalaya
- Ethnicity: Khasi
- Native speakers: 1 million (2011 census)
- Language family: Austroasiatic: Khasi-Palaungic; Khasic; Khasi
- Writing system: Latin (Khasi alphabet); Bengali-Assamese

Official status
- Official language in: India: Meghalaya

Language codes
- ISO 639-2: kha
- ISO 639-3: kha
- Glottolog: khas1269
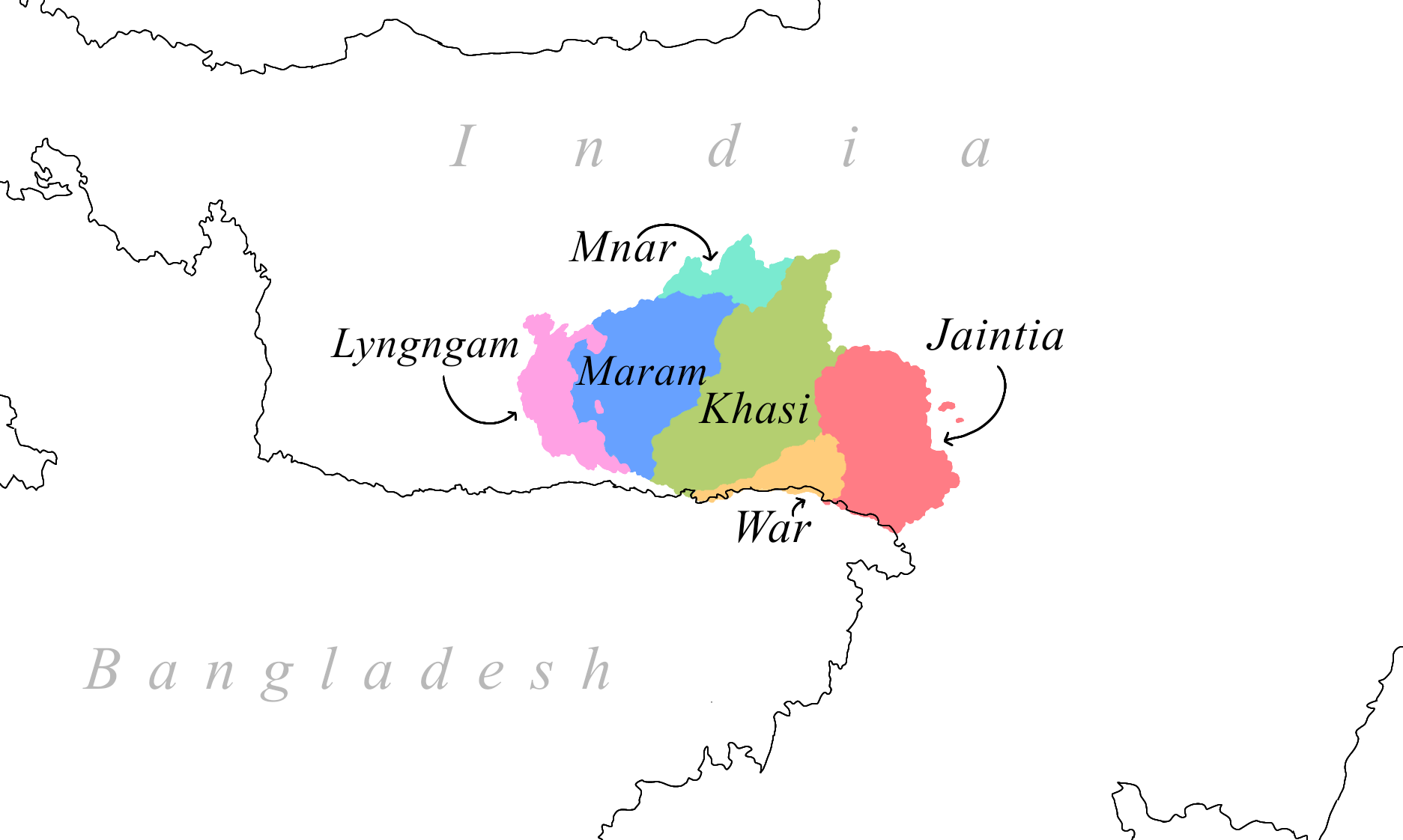
- Map of the Khasic Languages

- Khasi is classified as Vulnerable by the UNESCO Atlas of the World's Languages in Danger.

A Khasi speaker.

Khasi (Ka Ktien Khasi) is an Austroasiatic language with just over a million speakers in north-east India, primarily the Khasi people in the state of Meghalaya. The closest relatives of Khasi are the other languages in the Khasic group of the Shillong Plateau; these include Pnar, Lyngngam and War.

Khasi is written using the Latin script. In the first half of the 19th century, attempts to write Khasi in Bengali-Assamese script met with little success.

== Etymology ==
The term Khasi is generally regarded as an autonym. The English form was recorded by early colonial administrators and Christian missionaries in the nineteenth century. A deeper linguistic etymology of the term has not been firmly established in the scholarly literature, and no consensus exists regarding its original meaning.

== Geographic distribution and status ==
Khasi is natively spoken by 1,038,000 people in India (as of 2011). It is the first language of one-third of the population of Meghalaya, or 997,000, and its speakers are mostly found in the Khasi Hills and Jaintia Hills regions. There are also small Khasi-speaking communities in neighbouring states of India, the largest of which is in Assam: 34,600 people. There is also a very small number of speakers in Bangladesh.

Khasi has been an associate official language of some districts within Meghalaya since 2005, as of 2012, was no longer considered endangered by UNESCO, and since 2026, it became a full-fledged official language of Meghalaya. There are demands to include this language to the Eighth Schedule to the Constitution of India.

A sizable number of books have been published in Khasi, including novels, poetry, religious works, school textbooks and non-fiction. The most famous Khasi poet is U Soso Tham (1873–1940), whose death is commemorated annually as a regional holiday in the state of Meghalaya. Khasi sees everyday use on the internet, including blogs and several online newspapers.

== Dialects ==
The Sohra dialect is taken as the standard form of Khasi, and it was the first dialect to be written in Latin and Bengali scripts by the British. Although standard Khasi is spoken by a majority in Shillong, it is significantly different from the other Shillong dialects which form a dialect continuum across the capital region.

Khasi has significant dialectal variation, and this presents a challenge with regard to classifying the Khasic languages. The following are the dialects that are spoken among the Khasi tribes:

- Sohra Khasi (Sohra dialogue is a local and mass Communication among the Khasi Tribes which is well known as Khasi language)
- Mylliem Khasi
- Mawlai Khasi
- Nongkrem Khasi
- War Khasi, not to be confused with the closely associated War language
- Bhoi Khasi
- Nonglung

Pnar, Maram (including Langrin) and Lyngngam have also been listed as varieties of Khasi. However, more recent studies seem to indicate that these are sister languages to Khasi, and that Khasi began as a marginal Pnar dialect.

Bhoi, from Nongpoh, and Nonglung from Umsning, in Ri Bhoi District, differ substantially from standard Khasi in their word order. They are different enough from standard Khasi to be sometimes considered separate languages, with Bhoi sometimes classified as intermediate between Khasi and Pnar, and Nonglung being part of Mnar, variously classified as a dialect of War or Pnar.

== Phonology ==
This section discusses mainly the phonology of standard Khasi as spoken in and around the capital city, Shillong.

Khasi, mainly spoken in Meghalaya, is surrounded by unrelated languages: Assamese to the north and east, Sylheti to the south (both Indo-Aryan languages), Garo (a Tibeto-Burman language) to the west, and a plethora of other Tibeto-Burman languages including Manipuri, Mizo and Bodo.

Although over the course of time, language change has occurred, Khasi retains some distinctive features:

- Khasi remains a stress language, without tones, unlike many of its Tibeto-Burman neighbors.
- Like its Mon-Khmer relatives, Khasi has a large inventory of phonemic vowels (see below)
- The syllable structure of Khasi words resembles that of many Mon-Khmer languages, with many lexical items showing a CCVC shape, in which many combinations of consonants are possible in the onset (see examples below).

=== Consonants ===
Consonant phonemes
		Labial		Dental	Alveolar	Post- alveolar	Palatal	Velar	Glottal
Nasal		m		n			ɲ	ŋ	
Stop	Unaspirated	p	b	t̪	d		c	k	ʔ
Stop	Aspirated	pʰ	bʱ	t̪ʰ	dʱ			kʰ	
Affricate	Unaspirated				dʒ				
Affricate	Aspirated				dʒʱ				
Fricative					s	ʃ			h
Approximant							j	w	
Trill				r					
Lateral				l					

Examples
		IPA	Translation			IPA	Translation
m	mrad	[mraːt̚]	animal	n	nar	[nar]	iron
ɲ	ñia	[ɲaː]	aunt	ŋ	ngen	[ŋɛn]	wane
p	pan	[paːn]	ask	pʰ	phylla	[pʰɨlːaː]	special
b	blang	[blaŋ]	goat	bʱ	bhoi	[bʱɔɪ]	Bhoi
t̪	tdong	[t̪dɔŋ]	tail	tʰ	thah	[t̪ʰaːʔ]	ice
d	dur	[dʊr]	picture	dʱ	dheng	[dʱɛŋ]	park
k	krung	[krʊŋ]	rib	kʰ	khring	[kʰrɪŋ]	entice
dʒ	jlaw	[dʒlaːʊ]	howl	dʒʱ	jhieh	[dʒʱeːʔ]	wet
s	syiem	[sʔeːm]	monarch	ʃ	shñiuh	[ʃɲoːʔ]	hair
r	rynsan	[rɨnsaːn]	platform	l	lieh	[leːʔ]	white
j	ïor	[jɔːr]	snow	w	wah	[waːʔ]	river

=== Vowels ===
Vowel phonemes
	Front		Central		Back	
	Short	Long	Short	Long	Short	Long
Close	ɪ	iː	ɨ		ʊ	uː
Mid-Close	e	eː			o	oː
Mid-Open	ɛ	ɛː			ɔ	ɔː
Open			a	aː		

Examples
		IPA	Translation			IPA	Translation
ɪ	ding	[dɪŋ]	fire	iː	ih	[iːʔ]	cooked
ɨ	ynda	[ɨndaː]	until	uː	ruh	[ruːʔ]	also
e	miet	[met̚]	night	eː	iermat	[eːrmat̚]	eyelash
o	lum	[lom]	hill	oː	ud	[oːt̚]	moan
ɛ	reng	[rɛŋ]	horn	ɛː	erïong	[ɛːrjɔŋ]	whirlwind
ɔ	ong	[ɔŋ]	say	ɔː	Shillong	[ʃɨlːɔːŋ]	Shillong
a	sat	[sat̚]	spicy	aː	sad	[saːt̚]	ceiling

== Script ==
In the past, the Khasi language did not have its own script. Before British colonization, some of the Khasi Syiems (Royals) used to keep official records and communicate with one another on paper primarily using the Bengali script, and often employed Bengali mohurirs (clerks or scribes) from the neighboring plains of Sylhet. William Carey wrote the language with the Bengali script between 1813 and 1838, even sponsoring a Bible translation in Khasi with the assistance of Alexander B. Lish.

The Welsh missionary Thomas Jones arrived in Sohra on 22 June 1841 and proceeded to write down the local language in the Latin script. As a result, the modified Latin alphabet of the language has a few similarities with the Welsh alphabet. In 1842, the "First Khasi Reader" and a Rhodd Mam catechism became the first publications in the Khasi language. The first journal in Khasi was U Nongkit Khubor (The Messenger) published at Mawphlang in 1889 by William Williams. The first book in the Khasi language written by a native Khasi writer, Jeebon Roy, was published in 1897, and was entitled Ka Niam Jong Ki Khasi (The Religion of the Khasi).

=== Khasi alphabet ===
Khasi in Latin script has a system distinct from that of English. Khasi uses a 23-letter alphabet by removing the letters c, f, q, v, x and z from the basic Latin alphabet and adding the diacritic letters ï and ñ, and the digraph ng, which is treated as a letter in its own right. The diagraph ng is also present in Welsh alphabet.

Khasi Alphabet
Capital letters	A	B	K	D	E	G	Ng	H	I	Ï	J	L	M	N	Ñ	O	P	R	S	T	U	W	Y
Small letters	a	b	k	d	e	g	ng	h	i	ï	j	l	m	n	ñ	o	p	r	s	t	u	w	y
English Pronunciation	ah	bee	kay	dee	ay	eg	eng	esh	ee	yee	jay	ell	emm	enn	eñ	oh	pea	aar	ess	tee	oo	double yu	why
Assamese	আ	ব	ক	দ	এ	গ	ঙ	হ	ই	য	জ	ল	ম	ন	ঞ	অ	প	ৰ	স	ত	উ	ৱ	য়
Bengali	আ	ব	ক	দ	এ	গ	অং	হ	ই	য়ি	জ	ল	ম	ন	ঞ	ও	প	র	স	ত	উ	ঊ	ঈ

=== Pronunciation ===
- Vowel length is not usually marked in the orthography, although it can be marked optionally by an acute accent (sim /sim/ "bird" vs. rí /riː/ "country").
- The peculiar placement of k is due to it replacing c. c and ch were originally used in place of k and kh. When c was removed from the alphabet, k was put in its place.
- The inclusion of g is only due to its presence in the letter ng. It is not used independently in any word of native origin.
- h represents both the fricative sound as well as the glottal stop(ʔ) word-finally.
- y is not pronounced as in year, but is used for writing the close central unrounded vowel ([ɨ]) and the glottal stop between vowels. The sound in year is written with ï.

=== Digraphs ===
Besides ng, which is considered a single letter in the alphabet, Khasi has 8 other digraphs:

- Aspirated consonants are represented by digraphs kh, ph and th.
- Breathy voiced consonants are represented by digraphs bh, dh and jh.
- The /ʃ/ in Khasi is written sh.
- The digraph ie represents the /e/ sound, as opposed to e, which represents the sound /ɛ/.

This digraphs are not treated as single letters but rather as combinations of letters.

=== Lost Khasi Script ===
A local legend tells of how the Khasi people received their script from God, and that subsequently the Khasi people lost their script in a great flood. In 2017, it was reported that there is evidence of an undeciphered script, currently stored at the Kamarupa Anusandhan Samity Library in Guwahati, Assam, that is considered to be Khasi in origin.

== Grammar ==
Khasi is an Austroasiatic language and has its distinct features of a large number of consonant conjuncts, with prefixing and infixing.

=== Pronouns ===
	singular	plural
1st person	ŋa	ŋi
2nd person	pʰi	
3rd person	u/ka	ki
Diminutive	i	
Reflexive	la ~ lade	

=== Nouns and noun phrases ===
==== Word order ====
The order of elements in a Khasi noun phrase is (Case marker)-(Demonstrative)-(Numeral)-(Classifier)-(Article)-Noun-(Adjective)-(Prepositional phrase)-(Relative clause), as can be seen from the following examples:

ar tylli ki=sim
two CLF PL=bird
'two birds'

kato ka=kɨnthei kaba wan mynnin
that:F F=girl F-relative come yesterday
'that girl who came yesterday'

ka kmie jong phi
F mother of you
'your mother'

==== Gender ====
Khasi has a pervasive gender system. There are four genders in this language:

Gender markers in Khasi
Marker	Gender
u	masculine
ka	feminine
i	diminutive
ki	plural

Humans and domestic animals have their natural gender:

ka kmie "mother"
u kpa "father"
ka syiar "hen"
u syiar "rooster"

Rabel (1961) writes: "the structure of a noun gives no indication of its gender, nor does its meaning, but Khasi natives are of the impression that nice, small creatures and things are feminine while big, ugly creatures and things are masculine....This impression is not borne out by the facts. There are countless examples of desirable and lovely creatures with masculine gender as well as of unpleasant or ugly creatures with feminine gender"

Though there are several counterexamples, Rabel says that there is some semantic regularity in the assignment of gender for the following semantic classes:

Feminine	Masculine
times, seasons
clothes	reptiles, insects, flora, trees
physical features of nature	heavenly bodies
manufactured articles	edible raw material
tools for polishing	tools for hammering, digging
trees of soft fibre	trees of hard fibre

The matrilineal aspect of the society can also be observed in the general gender assignment, where so, all central and primary resources associated with day-to-day activities are signified as Feminine; whereas Masculine signifies the secondary, the dependent or the insignificant.

Feminine	Masculine
Sun (Ka Sngi)	Moon (U Bnai)
Wood (Ka Dieng)	Tree (U Dieng)
Honey (Ka Ngap)	Bee (U Ngap)
House (Ka Ïing)	Column (U Rishot)
Cooked rice (Ka Ja)	Uncooked rice (U Khaw)

Note: However do note that there are no such universal rules for gender assignment of nouns in Khasi. There are a lot of exceptions and one such is syntiew ('flower'), which is stereotypically considered feminine but is accompanied with masculine gender signifier "u" i.e. u syntiew. This gender assignment to nouns is highly depended on what the native speakers assign the noun which they all naturally agree upon but which can vary sometimes like according to the mood or tone.

==== Classifiers ====
Khasi has a classifier system, apparently used only with numerals. Between the numeral and noun, the classifier tylli is used for non-humans, and the classifier ngut is used for humans, e.g.

Don ar tylli ki=sim ha ruh.
there:are two CLF PL=bird in cage
'There are two birds in the cage.'

Don lai ngut ki=Sordar ha shnong.
there:are three CLF PL=chief in village
'There are three chiefs in the village.'

=== Adjectives ===
There is some controversy about whether Khasi has a class of adjectives. Roberts cites examples like the following:

u briew ba-bha
3SG.MASC man REL-good
'a good man'

In nearly all instances of attributive adjectives, the apparent adjective has the prefix /ba-/, which seems to be a relativiser. There are, however, a few adjectives without the /ba-/ prefix:

u 'riew sníew
3SG.MASC man bad
'a bad man'

When the adjective is the main predicate, it may appear without any verb 'be':

U ksew u=lamwir.
3SG.MASC dog M=restless
'The dog is restless.'

In this environment, the adjective is preceded by an agreement marker, like a verb. Thus it may be that Khasi does not have a separate part of speech for adjectives, but that they are a subtype of verb.

=== Prepositions and prepositional phrases ===
Khasi appears to have a well-developed group of prepositions, among them

- bad "with, and"
- da "with (instrumental)"
- na "from"
- ha "in, at"
- sha "in, at"
- jong "of"

The following are examples of prepositional phrases:

ka kmie jong phi
FEM mother of you
'your mother'

u slap u=ther na ka bneng
3SG.MASC rain M=pour from FEM sky
'Rain poured from the sky.'

=== Verbs and verb phrases ===
==== Agreement ====
Verbs agree with 3rd person subjects in gender, but there is no agreement for non-3rd persons (Roberts 1891):

	Singular	Plural
1st person	nga thoh 'I write'	ngi thoh 'we write'
2nd person	me thoh 'he (masc) writes' pha thoh 'she (fem) writes'	phi thoh 'you (pl). write'
3rd person	u thoh 'he writes' ka thoh 'she writes'	ki thoh 'they write'

The masculine and feminine markers /u/ and /ka/ are used even when there is a noun phrase subject (Roberts 1891:132):

Ka miaw ka pah.
FEM cat FEM meow
'The cat meows.'

==== Tense marking ====
Tense is shown through a set of particles that appear after the agreement markers but before the verb. The future marker is fused with subject pronouns, plural marker, as well as gender marker. Past is a particle /la/ and future is /yn/ (contracted to 'n after a vowel):

Khasi	English
U thoh.	He writes.
U thoh.	He wrote.
U la thoh.	He has written.
Un thoh	He will write.

==== Negation ====
Negation is also shown through an enclitic, =ɨm (contracted to 'm after a vowel), which appears between the agreement and the tense particle. There is a special past negation particle ʃɨm in the past which replaces the ordinary past /la/ (Roberts 1891):

Khasi	English
Um ju thoh.	He doesn't write.
Um shym thoh.	He didn't write.
Um nym thoh	He won't write.
Um dei ban thoh	He shouldn't write.

u=m baːm
3SG.M=NEG eat
'He does not eat.'

ka=n=ɨm ʈʰja
3SG.F=FUT=NEG sleep
'She will not sleep.'

Another negation particle, kʰlem, is equivalent to the past tense negative construct =m ʃɨm la, can also be used as a negative subordinator:

kʰlem baːm u la leʲt
NEG eat 3SG.M PST go
'He left without eating.'

==== Copulas ====
The copula is an ordinary verb in Khasi, as in the following sentence:

U Blei u=long jingïeid.
3SG.MASC God M=be love
'God is love'

==== Causative verbs ====
Khasi has a morphological causative /pn-/ (Rabel 1961). (This is spelled pyn in Roberts (1891)):

Base verb	Gloss	Causative verb	Gloss
hiar	come down	pynhiar	let down, export
tip	know	pyntip	make known
phuh	blossom	pynphuh	beautify
ïaid	walk	pyn-ïaid	drive, put agoing
jot	torn	pyn-jot	destroy
poi	arrive	pyn-poi	deliver

=== Sentences ===
==== Word order ====
Word order in simple sentences is subject–verb–object (SVO):

U ksew u=baːm doh.
3SG.M dog M=eat flesh
'The dog eats meat.'

However, VSO order is also found, especially after certain initial particles, like hangta 'then' (Rabel 1961).

hangta la ong i khnai ja ka Naam
then PAST say DIM mouse ACC FEM Naam
'Then said the (little) mouse to Naam ... '

==== Case marking ====
Sometimes the object is preceded by a particle ya (spelled ia in Roberts 1891). Roberts says "ia, 'to', 'for', 'against' implies direct and immediate relation. Hence its being the sign of the dative and of the accusative case as well"

U la ái ja ka=kitab ja nga.
3SG.M PAST give ACC FEM=book ACC me
'He gave the book to me.'

It appears from Roberts (1891) that Khasi has differential object marking, since only some objects are marked accusative. Roberts notes that nouns that are definite usually have the accusative and those that are indefinite often do not.

Rabel (1961) says "the use of ïa is optional in the case of one object. In the case of two objects one of them must have ïa preceding.... If one of the objects is expressed by a pronoun, it must be preceded by ïa."

Broadly speaking, Khasi have 8 prepositions on NPs to indicate relations between arguments in constituent clauses, with the nominative case remaining unmarked, for a total of nine cases. They are fairly pervasive and play an important role in Khasi syntax.

Case markers in Khasi
Case	Marker
Nominative	(unmarked)
Accusative-dative	ja
Ablative	na
Locative	ha
Allative	ʃa
Genitive	ʤoŋ
Instrumental	da
Comitative	baːt
Perlative	lɨŋba
Vocative	ko?

All case markers can appear with or without the prenominal markers/articles u, ka, i and ki, and are placed before the prenominal markers.

==== Passive ====
Khasi has a passive, but it involves removing the agent of the sentence without putting the patient in subject position. (A type called the 'non-ascensional passive'). Compare the following active-passive pair (Roberts 1891) where the patient continues to have accusative case and remains in the object position:

Ki dang tháw ja ka ïing da ki dieng..
PL contin build ACC FEM house with PL wood
'They are building the house with wood.'

Dang tháw ja ka ïing.
contin build ACC FEM house
'The house is being built.'

This type of passive is used, even when the passive agent is present in a prepositional phrase:

La lah pyniap ja ka masi da {U Míet}.
PAST PFV kill ACC FEM cow by {U‍ Miet}
'The cow was killed by U Miet.'

==== Questions ====
Yes–no questions seem to be distinguished from statements only by intonation:

Phi kit khoh Til?
you {are carrying} {a basket} Til?
'Will you take a basket, Til?

Wh-questions do not involve moving the wh-element:

u leit shaei?
MASC go where
Where is he going?'

==== Embedded clauses ====
Subordinate clauses follow the main verb that selects them (Roberts 1891:169):

Nga tip ba phi la leh ja kata.
I know that you PAST do ACC that
'I know that you have done that'

Relative clauses follow the nouns that they modify and agree in gender:

Ka {samla kynthei} ka-ba wan mynhynnin ka la iáp.
FEM girl FEM-relative come yesterday FEM PAST die
'The girl who came yesterday has died.'

=== Contractions and other reduced forms ===
==== Contractions ====
A variety of Khasi prepositions and other words are contracted or reduced both in spoken and written language. One of the most common form of contractions is when a pronoun is grouped with the verbs "yn" or "ym" (for e.g. u yn contracts to u'n). Or when a preposition is grouped with a vowel-like gender identifier such as "u" and "i" (for e.g. ha u contracts to h'u).

Full form	Contracted form
ki ym	ki'm
ki yn	ki'n
ka ym	ka'm
ka yn	ka'n
i yn	i'n
i ym	i'm
nga yn	nga'n
nga ym	nga'm
phi yn	phi'n
phi ym	phi'm
u yn	u'n
u ym	u'm
ba yn	ba'n
ha u	h'u
da u	d'u
ïa u	ï'u
ba u	b'u
ba la	b'la
la u	l'u
la i	l'i

==== Reduced words ====
Reduced form of words are common in the Khasi language. Most of the time, one or a couple of letters are dropped at the beginning of a word (for e.g. briew can become 'riew). There's no clear rule behind this process but usually these words that undergo reduction begins with more than one consonants; the reduced word is accompanied by an apostrophe from the start to mark so. The reduced form of the word is still understood by its context of usage and since its last inner syllabus and letters (i.e. rhyme) are always preserved.

Word	Reduced form
briew	'riew
khlaw	'law
sla	'la
blei	'lei
shniuh	'niuh
shnong	'nong
lyer	'er
kti	'ti
blang	'lang
khñiang	'ñiang
khmat	'mat
shkor	'kor
dohkha	'kha

These reduced forms of words are mostly seen in compound forms where the reduced word is affixed with other words to give rise to new words with new meanings. In compound form, the apostrophe is not used anymore. For e.g. 'riew as in riewkhlaw, riewspah, riewhyndai etc.

== Sample text in Khasi ==
=== Article 1 of the Universal Declaration of Human Rights ===
Khasi Alphabet

Ïa ki bynriew baroh la kha laitluid bad ki ïaryngkat ha ka burom bad ki hok. Ha ki la bsiap da ka bor pyrkhat bad ka jingïatiplem bad ha ka mynsiem jingsngew shipara, ki dei ban ïatrei bynrap lang.

(Jinis 1 jong ka Jingpynbna-Ïar Satlak ïa ki Hok Longbriew-Manbriew)

Assamese script যা কি বৃনৰ‌্যের বাৰহ লা খা লাচলোছ বাড কী যৰূঙ্কট হা কি বুৰম বাড ক হক. হাকি লা বৃস্যপ দা ক বৰ-পৃৰ্খট বাড ক চিংযাতিপলেম বাড হা ক মৃন্স্যেম চিংস্ঙেউ শীপাৰা, কী দেই বাণ যত্ৰেই বৃনৰাপ লাং.

(জিনিস বানৃঙ্গং জং ক চিংপৃনবৃনা-যাৰ সত্লাক যা কি হক লংব্ৰ্যের-মানব্র্যের.)

IPA

jaː ki bɨnreʊ baːrɔʔ laː kʰaː lacloc bat ki jaːrɨŋkat haː kaː burɔm bat ki hɔk. haː ki laː bsjap daː kaː bɔːr pɨrkʰat bat kaː dʒɪŋjaːtɪplɛm bat haː kaː mɨnseːm dʒɨŋsŋɛʊ ʃiparaː ki dɛɪ ban jaːtrɛɪ bɨnrap laŋ

(dʒinɪs banɨŋkɔŋ dʒɔŋ kaː dʒɨŋpɨnbnaː-jaːr satlak jaː ki hɔk lɔŋbreʊ manbreʊ)

Gloss

To the human all are born free and they equal in the dignity and the rights. In them are endowed with the power thought and the conscience and in the spirit feeling fraternity they should to work assist together.

(Article first of the Declaration Universal of the Rights Humanity)

Translation

All human beings are born free and equal in dignity and rights. They are endowed with reason and conscience and should work towards each other in a spirit of brotherhood.

== Basic vocabulary ==
Khasi language	English
Khublei (khu-blei)	Thank You
Phi long kumno?	How are you? In short it is also used as "Kumno?"
Nga khlaiñ	I am fine.
Kumne	Short form response to 'Kumno?' meaning 'like this'.
Um	Water
Ja	(cooked) rice
Dohkha (doh-kha)	fish (meat)
Dohsyiar (doh-syiar)	chicken (meat)
Dohsniang (doh-sni-ang)	pork (meat)
Dohmasi (doh-ma-si)	beef (meat)
Dohblang (doh-bl-ang)	mutton (meat)
Jyntah (jyn-tah)	dish (meat/vegetable)
Jhur (jh-ur)	vegetable
Dai	lentils
Mluh (ml-uh)	salt
Duna (du-na)	less
Sohmynken (soh-myn-ken)	chilli
Sngewbha ai biang seh	Please give again (serve again).
Lah biang	enough
Sngewbha ai um seh	Please give water.
Sngewbha ai ja seh	Please give food (rice).
Sngewbha ai jyntah seh	Please give (side dish) vegetable / meat.
Ai aiu? / Kwah aiu?	What do you want?
Sngewbha ai kwai seh	Please give 'kwai'.
Aiu?	What?
Mynno?	When? (past)
Lano?	When? (future)
Hangno? / Shano?	Where?
Kumno?	How?
Thiah suk.	Sleep well. (The equivalent of "Good Night".)
Kumno ngan leit sha Nan Polok?	How do I go to Ward's Lake?
Katno ka dor une / kane?	What is the price of this? (une is masculine gender, kane is feminine gender and ine is neutral gender)
Leit suk.	Happy journey
Reply is "Shong suk."	Literal meaning is "Stay happy."

=== Numbers ===
1	wei
2	ar
3	lai
4	saw
5	san
6	hynriew
7	hynñiew
8	phra
9	khyndai
10	shiphew
20	arphew
30	laiphew
40	sawphew
50	sanphew
60	hynriewphew
70	hynñiewphew
80	phraphew
90	khyndaiphew
100	shispah
200	arspah
300	laispah
400	sawspah
500	sanspah
600	hynriewspah
700	hynñiewspah
800	phraspah
900	khyndaispah
1000	shihajar
10,000	shiphewhajar
100,000	shilak
10,000,000	shiklur
1,000,000,000	shiarab
