= Mawkyrwat =

Village in Meghalaya, India

Mawkyrwat is the headquarters of South West Khasi Hills district of Meghalaya state in India. It is situated at a distance of 75 km from the capital city of Shillong.

Nonglang is located nearby.

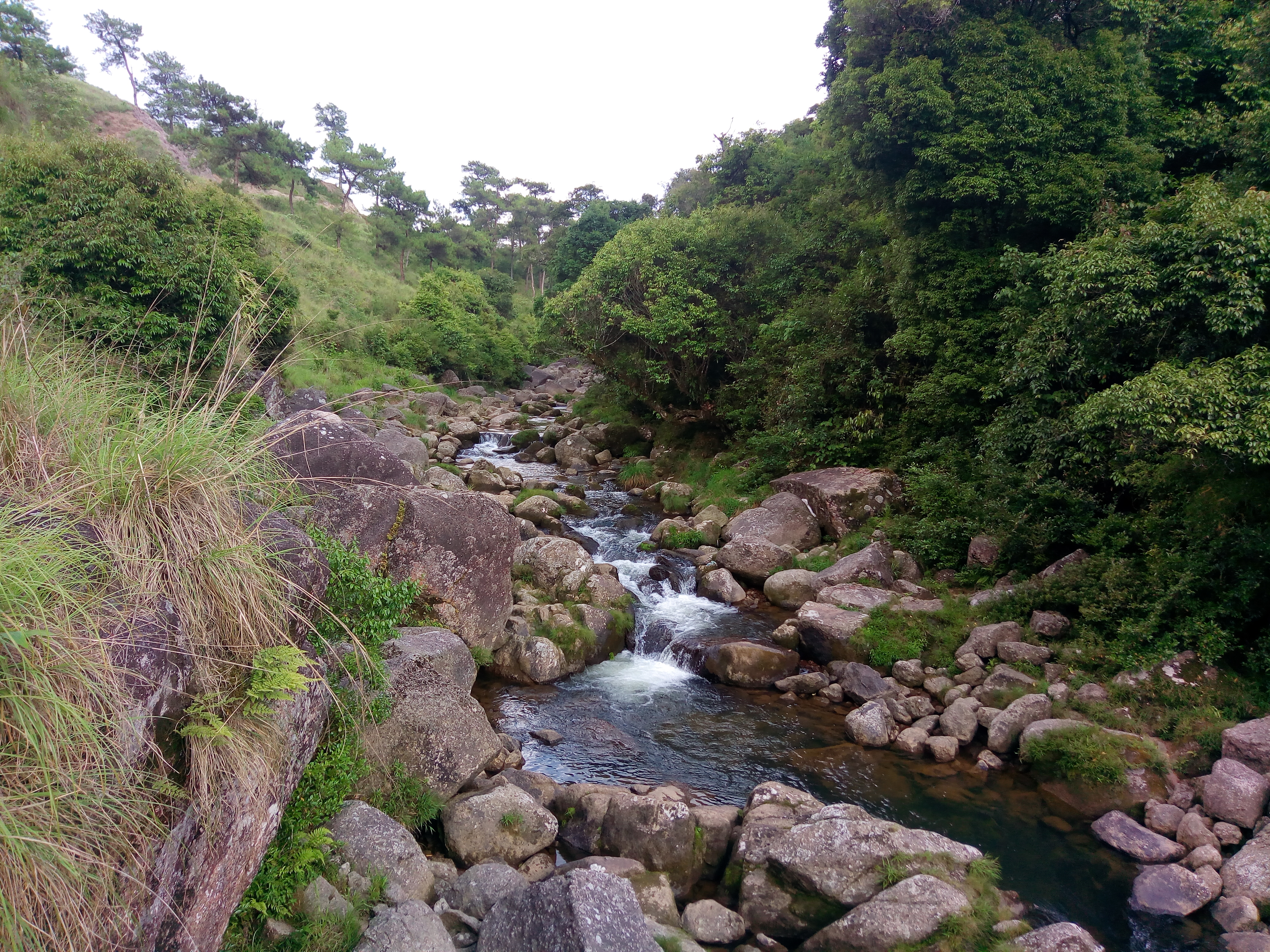
A river in Mawkyrwat
