= Nongstoin =

Nongstoin Nongstiiñ
- Town
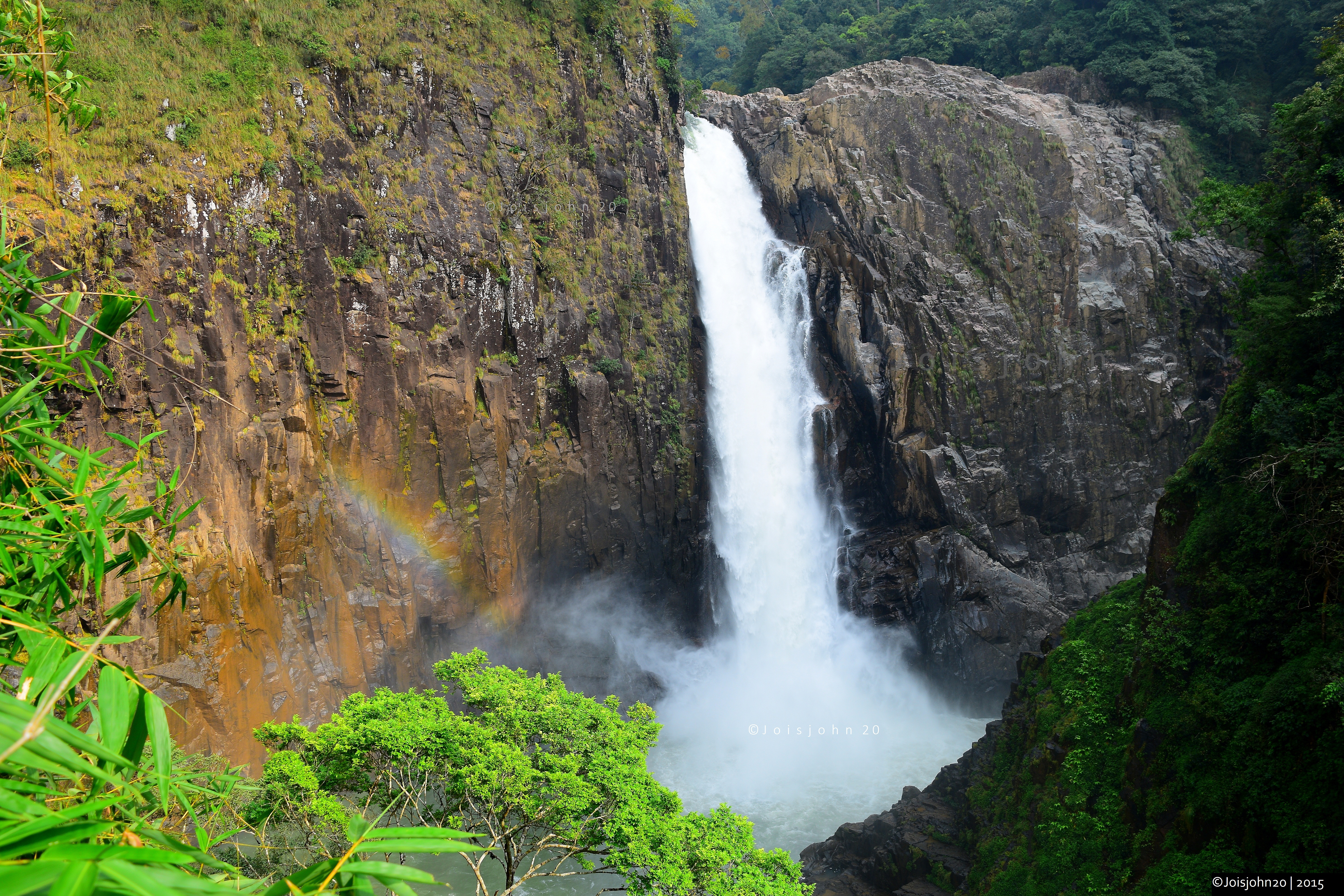
- Langshiang Falls near Nongstoin

- Location in Meghalaya, India Nongstoin (India)
- Coordinates: 25.52°N 91.27°E
- Country: India
- State: Meghalaya
- District: West Khasi Hills
- Elevation: 1,409 m (4,623 ft)

Population (2011)
  - Total: 28,742
- Time zone: UTC+5:30 (IST)
- Postal code: 793119
- Vehicle registration: ML 06
- Climate: Cwb

Nongstoin (IPA: ˈnɒŋˌstɔɪn) is the headquarters of West Khasi Hills district in the state of Meghalaya in India. As of the 2011 census, it had a population of 28,742.

== Geography ==
Nongstoin is located at 25.52°N 91.27°E. It has an average elevation of 1409 metres (4622 feet)

The Langshiang Falls is located 24 kilometres (15 mi) from Nongstoin.

== Demographics ==
As of 2001 India census, Nongstoin had a population of 22,003. Males constitute 50% of the population and females 50%. Nongstoin has an average literacy rate of 67%, higher than the national average of 59.5%: male literacy is 67%, and female literacy is 66%. In Nongstoin, 23% of the population is under 6 years of age.

Religion in Nongstoin (2011)
1. Christianity (98.7%)
2. Hinduism (0.63%)
3. Islam (0.37%)
4. Others (0.34%)

Most of the people in the town overwhelmingly follow Christianity; with significant followers of Hinduism and a small Muslim population.

== Culture ==
In January 2006, Pope Benedict XVI erected a diocese in Nongstoin; covering the West Khasi Hills district. The Franciscan Missionary Brothers of the Catholic Church run a college and a school at Siejlieh, Nongstoin.

Nongkhnum River Island has hosted the annual Nongkhnum Festival since 2015. The festival also includes activities such as pole climbing, trekking, beauty contests, and motocross. Since the event is organised with Swachh Bharat, it is meant to raise awareness about cleanliness. The event is supposed to be a plastic-free zone. Two people drowned in the river and one was injured at the motocross event.

== Place of Interest ==
- Nongkhnum River Island and Beach
  - Weinia Falls
  - Shadthum Falls
  - Riatsohkhe Falls
- Langshiang Falls, Wei Spi Falls, Shad Chong Falls
- Mawthadraishan Peak and Lakes
- Pamphyrnai Lake
- Umyiap Paddy Field
- Rambrai, Urkhli, Mawlangsu.
- Punglieh, Syllei Iawkhein
- Wahriat Falls
- Nongstoin Bye Pass
- Kynroh
- Rwiang river, Wahblei river
