= John Deng Pohrmen =

Former deputy chief minister of Meghalaya

John Deng Pohrmen (d. 18 August 2012) was a War-Jaintia politician from West Jaintia Hills district in Meghalaya, India. He was the former deputy chief minister of Meghalaya. During his multiple terms as legislators, he served as cabinet minister with different portfolios under many chief ministers.

== Early life ==
John Deng was born at Nongtalang village in the former Jaintia Hills District (now West Jaintia Hills district). From 1952 to 1967, he worked as a school teacher in St. Anthony's High School, Shillong. In 1955, he was elected as a ward commissioner of the Shillong Municipal Board. He served as editor of two Khasi newspapers — Ka Lympung Ri Lum and U Nongsain Hima.

== Political life ==
Early on, Pohrmen was involved in the Hill State Movement and joined active politics in the early 1960s.

=== All Party Hill Leaders Conference ===
He was elected to the Jaintia Hills Autonomous District Council as a member of the All Party Hill Leaders Conference (APHLC) in 1967. He later became the council's Chief Executive Member (CEM).

In 1978 Pohrmen was elected to the Meghalaya Legislative Assembly from the War Jaintia constituency on the APHLC ticket. He became a cabinet minister in 'The Three Flag Government' under the chief ministership of Darwin Diengdoh Pugh. He also served as a cabinet minister in the first B. B. Lyngdoh government.

=== Indian National Congress ===
In 1981 Pohrmen joined the Indian National Congress and later, became president of the Jaintia Hills District Congress Committee. He then served as a cabinet minister in the P. A. Sangma government. In 1991, Porhmen refused to accept the proposal of his Congress legislators to become the chief minister and instead proposed D. D. Lapang as the leader. He then served as a cabinet minister in the coalition governments of D. D. Lapang, and S. C. Marak.

== Death ==
After prolonged illness, Pohrmen died on 18 August 2012 at his residence in Laitumkhrah at the age of 86. He was survived by his wife, Margaret Rose Rapthap and four children. His funeral was held at the Laitumkhrah Catholic cemetery.
