= Pasyih =

Village in Meghalaya, India

Pasyih, located at 25.4817°N 92.2882°E is a village in Laskein C.D. Block near Jowai in the West Jaintia Hills district of Meghalaya state of India. Pasyih is a part of three contiguous villages:

- A small settlement commonly known as Phra Mer (8th Mile), so called because of its distance from Jowai)
- The village of Muthlong
- The village of Pasyih.

Phra Mer is known for the coal deposits along (National Highway 44) that come from nearby coal mines. Pasyih and Muthlong lie away from the highway, en route to Mynso village and Shangpung/Garampani (Jowai-Garampani-Umrangso Road), respectively.
