= Nongtalang College =

Co-educational college in Meghalaya, India

Coordinates: 25°12′27″N 92°03′54″E

- Motto: Educatio Ad Virtute
- Motto in English: The Power of Education
- Established: 1988
- Affiliations: North Eastern Hill University (NEHU) & Meghalaya Board of School Education (MBOSE); Accredited by NAAC on 09-June-2017 Grade B
- Principal: Dr. Ryan Reid Kharkongor
- Location: Nongtalang, West Jaintia Hills district, Meghalaya Pin Code: 793109, India
- Website: www.nongtalangcollege.org

Nongtalang College is an Indian co-educational higher education facility located in the rural borderlands of the Khasi and Jaintia Hills in the Indian state of Meghalaya, near the international border with Bangladesh. Founded in 1988, it offers college-level instruction to disadvantaged young men and women from the region who are seeking to advance their higher studies. As of February 2023 it held a 'B' grade accreditation from the National Assessment and Accreditation Council.

== History ==
Nongtalang College was founded in 1988 by the Nongtalang Village Durbar, guided by the late Shri John Deng Pohrmen, former Deputy Chief Minister of Meghalaya. On April 9, 1988, the late Shri Purno A. Sangma, then Chief Minister of Meghalaya, laid the foundation stone for the main college building.

The primary goal of the Nongtalang Village Durbar in creating this institution was to offer educational opportunities to underprivileged students in the region, specifically those whose families lacked the financial means to send them to larger towns and cities for higher education.

In order to establish a residential campus, the Nongtalang Village Durbar and Manniew Durbar gifted the college one hectare of land on the periphery of Nongtalang village, also committing to provide additional adjacent land should the college need it in the future. Shri S.C. Marak, who was serving as Meghalaya's Chief Minister at the time, laid the foundation stone for this campus on December 19, 1996.

== Aims and objectives ==
The college has the overall objective of empowering disadvantaged young people in the area, irrespective of their caste, creed, or faith, thereby actively participating in the broader progress of both the state and the nation.

As such, it has four specific aims:

1. To offer college-level instruction to young men and women seeking to advance their higher studies;
2. To deliver an education that motivates students toward selfless, committed service in whatever capacity or location they are needed across the nation;
3. To maintain, to the greatest extent possible, a high standard of scholarship and academic excellence, equipping students to be responsible citizens throughout their lives and careers;
4. To foster an educational environment that encourages students to critically engage with and form well-reasoned perspectives on the nation's social, economic, political, educational, and moral challenges.

== Administration ==
Nongtalang College operates with the backing of the Meghalaya government, and is managed by a governing body.

It is officially registered under the Meghalaya Societies Registration Act, XII of 1983, holding Certificate of Registration No. SR/NC-241/89 from 1989. Official approval to open the college was issued by the Director of Public Instruction in Shillong, Meghalaya, under reference No. CE/GA/ESU/6/80-81/49 on October 10, 1993. As such, it operates as a co-educational facility on a dedicated campus in Nongtalang village, in the rural borderlands of the Khasi and Jaintia Hills near the international border with Bangladesh.

The Indian National Assessment and Accreditation Council awarded the college a 'B' grade accreditation in 2017, a status it successfully renewed in February 2023.
