= Umngot River =

River in Meghalaya, India

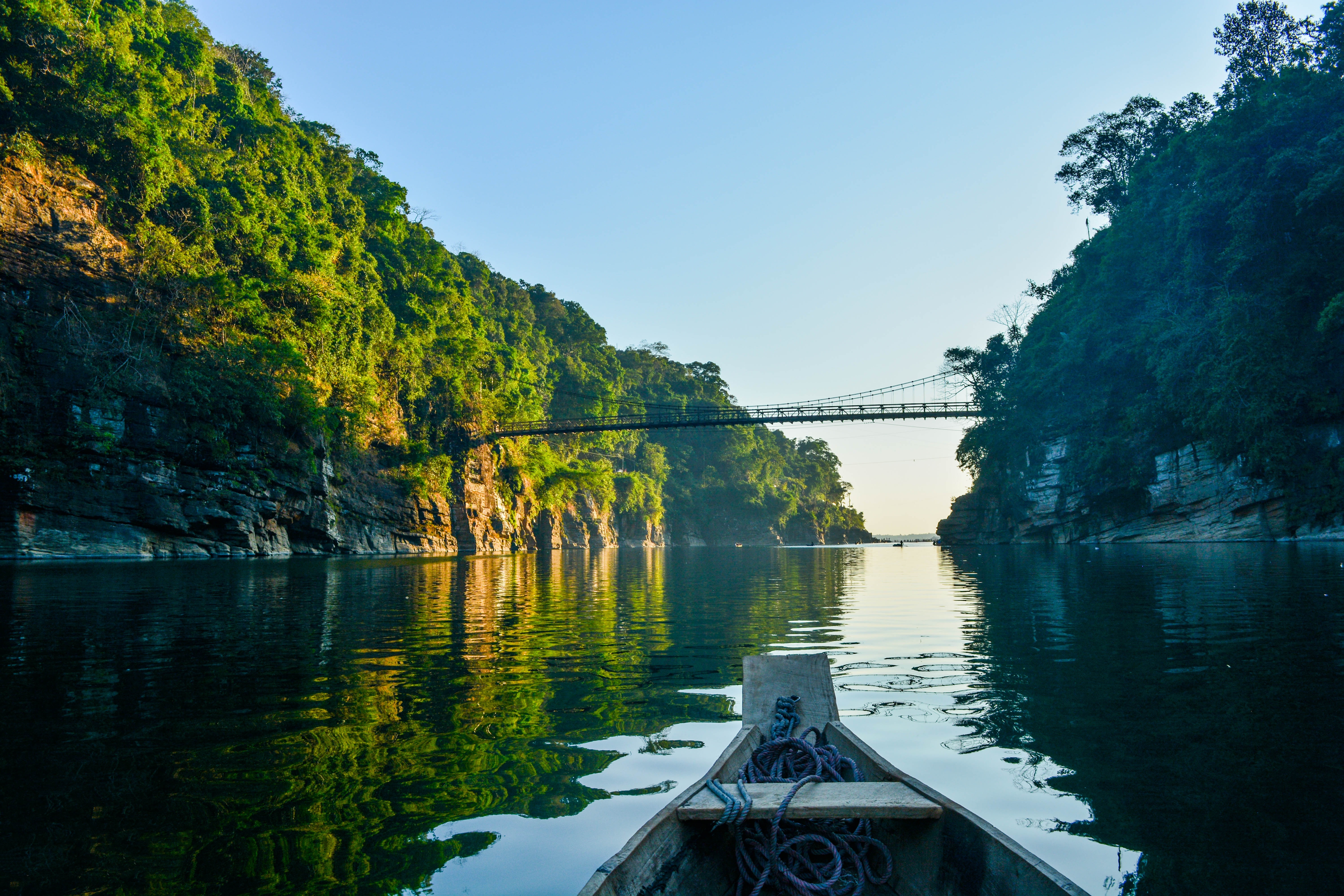
Umngot River

The Umngot River, also known as the Dawki River and Wah Umngot, is a river which flows through Dawki, a small town located at the bottom of the Jaintia Hills in West Jaintia Hills district in the Indian state of Meghalaya. The town is relatively busy and serves as a trade route between India and Bangladesh. The river is known for its cleanliness and transparent water with a visible riverbed.

== Environment ==
The Umngot, arguably one of India's cleanest rivers, is an important fishing spot for local fishermen. The river sits on the India-Bangladesh border, and a white portion of the river, caused by a rise in the current, marks the unofficial boundary between the two countries.

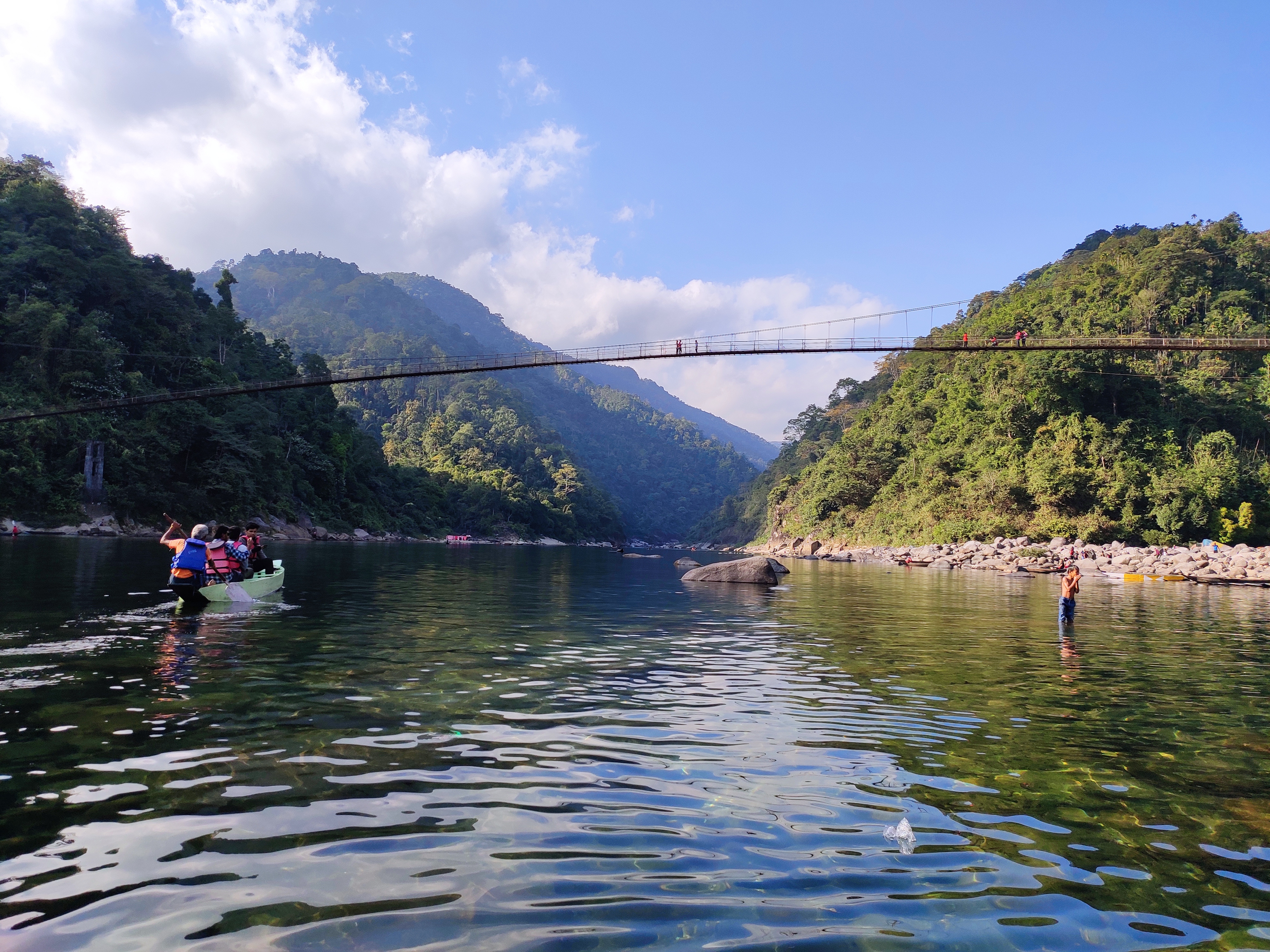
Dawki Bridge over the Umngot

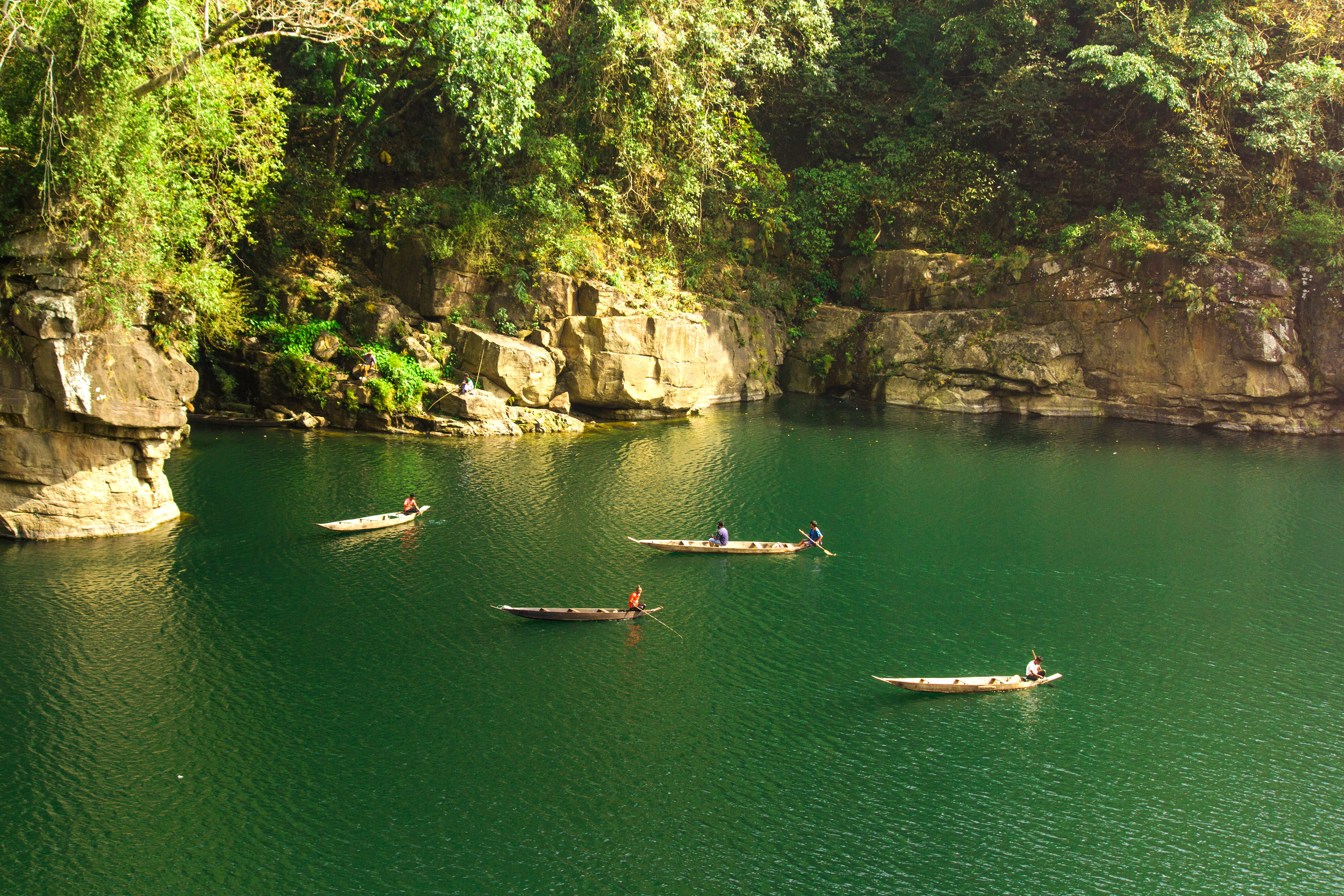
Fishermen at the river

A suspension bridge, the Dawki Bridge, spans the Umngot River. It was constructed in 1932, and is a place of interest.

== Projects ==
In April 2021, the Meghalaya government undertook a decision to construct a dam on the river, in view of shortage of electricity. The project was the proposed 210 MW Umngot Hydroelectric Project, which received loads of backlash and opposition from the local villagers, who feared that its construction would disrupt tourism. The project was eventually scrapped.
