= Coleophora tarsocoma =

Scientific classification
- Kingdom: Animalia
- Phylum: Arthropoda
- Class: Insecta
- Order: Lepidoptera
- Family: Coleophoridae
- Genus: Coleophora
- Species: C. tarsocoma

Binomial name
- Coleophora tarsocoma Meyrick, 1917

Species of moth

Coleophora tarsocoma is a moth of the family Coleophoridae. It is found in north-eastern India (Assam, Khasi-Jaintia Hills, near Shillong).

== Taxonomy ==
Research has concluded that Coleophora tarsocoma does not belong to the family Coleophoridae. It could belong to the family Cosmopterigidae.
