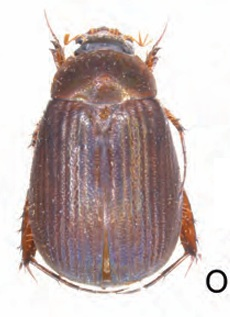

Scientific classification
- Kingdom: Animalia
- Phylum: Arthropoda
- Class: Insecta
- Order: Coleoptera
- Suborder: Polyphaga
- Infraorder: Scarabaeiformia
- Family: Scarabaeidae
- Genus: Maladera
- Species: M. jaintiaensis

Binomial name
- Maladera jaintiaensis Ahrens & Fabrizi, 2016

= Maladera jaintiaensis =

Species of beetle

Maladera jaintiaensis is a species of beetle of the family Scarabaeidae. It is found in India (Meghalaya, Nagaland), Laos and China (Fujian, Guangdong, Jiangxi, Yunnan).

== Description ==
Adults reach a length of about 9.5–9.6 mm. They have a dark brown, oblong-oval body. The antennae are yellowish. The upper surface is mostly dull, with numerous long setae on the elytra, but otherwise nearly glabrous.

== Etymology ==
The species name refers to its occurrence in the Jaintia Hills.
