= Nongtalang =

Nongtalang Nongtelang
- Town
- Location in Meghalaya, India Nongtalang (India)
- Coordinates: 25.209300°N 92.066846°E
- Country: India
- State: Meghalaya
- District: West Jaintia Hills

Population
  - Total: 5,595

Languages
  - Official: War, Khasi & English
- Time zone: UTC+5:30 (IST)
- PIN: 793 109

Nongtalang is a rural town in West Jaintia Hills district, Meghalaya, India. It is a popular tourist destination, notably for the Rbang Amkhlew Living Root Bridge.

== Population ==
The town population is around 5,600 people.The people of Nongtalang are mostly War-Jaintias, a tribal group native to Meghalaya. They also a unique language and religion.

== Connectivity ==
Nongtalang is well connected by roadways to Shillong, Meghalaya's state capital, and Jowai, the district headquarters. Shillong is 98 km away and Jowai is 42 km away.

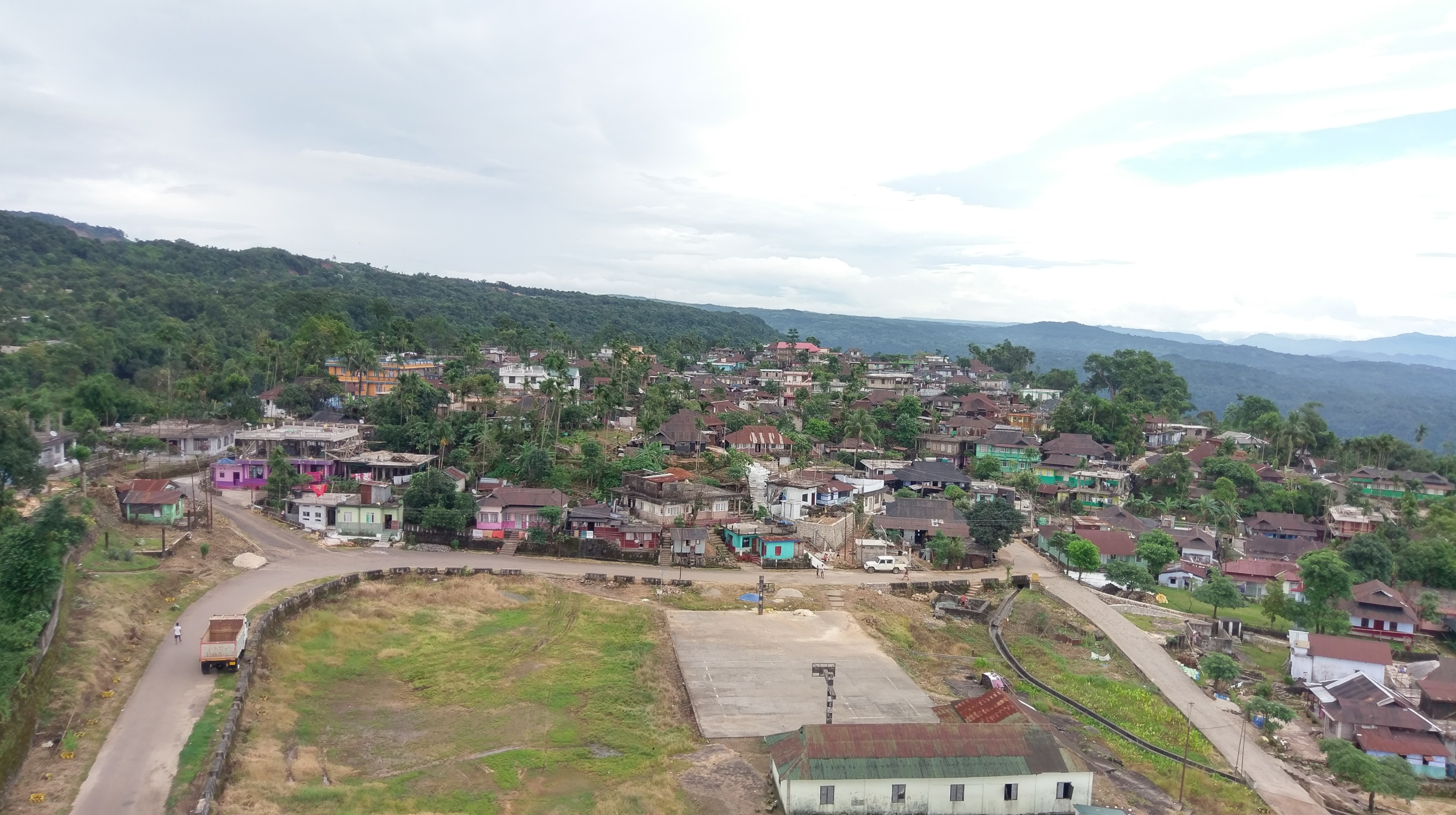
View of Nongtalang Khlachympa at Nongtalang Town from above.

=== Communication services ===
Fixed telephone lines are not available in this small town. Internet services are available only through wireless broadband. It is only two cellular providers available i.e. Bharti Airtel 5G & Jio 5G.

== Institutions in Nongtalang ==
The Nongtalang College, a private college run by the village Council (Village Durbar of Nongtalang), is one of the oldest colleges in Meghalaya.

Colleges and Institution providing higher studies
- Nongtalang College

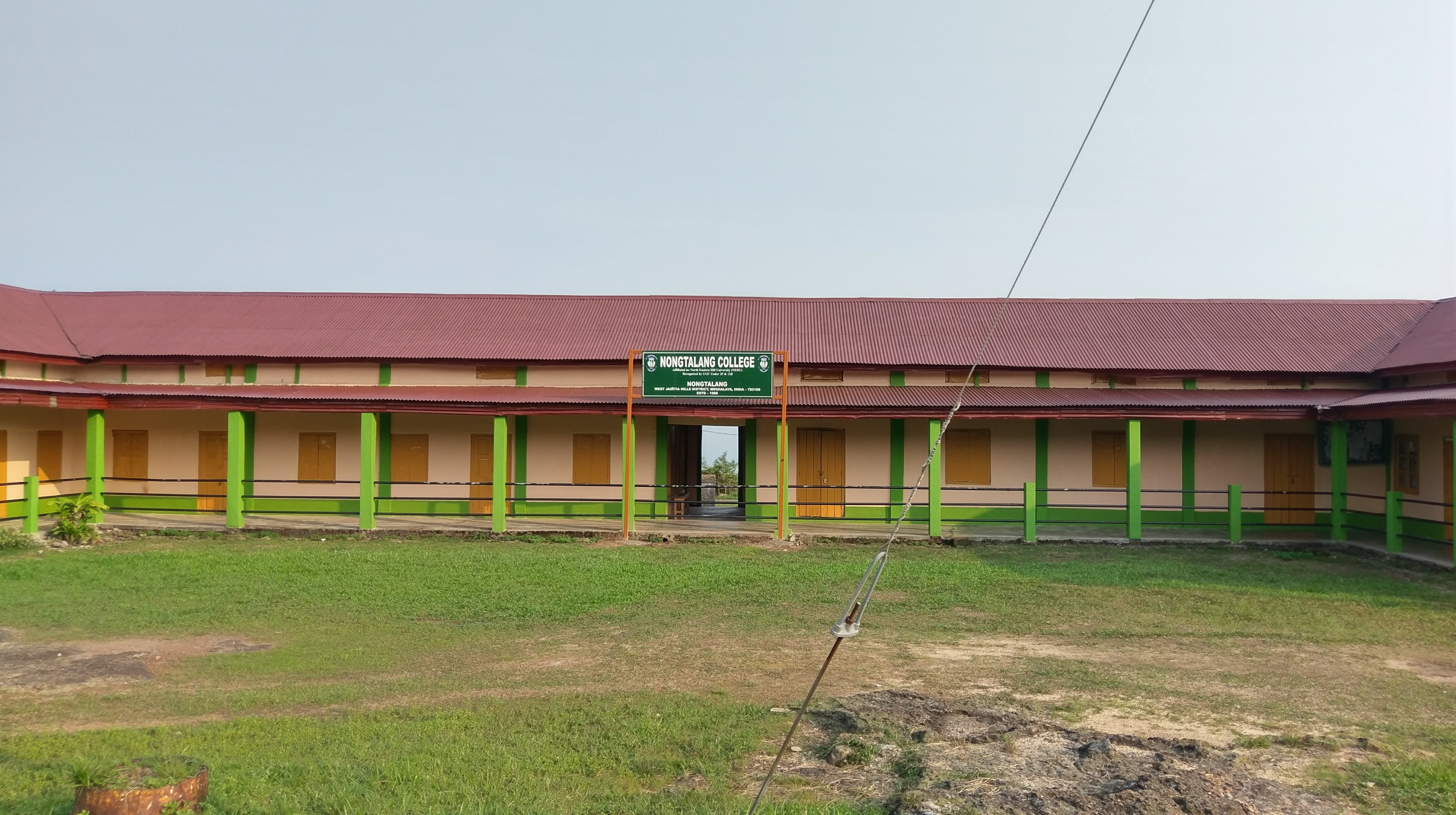
Nongtalang College

Prominent schools and higher secondary institutions

- Nongtalang Government Secondary School, Nongtalang
- St Joseph Secondary School, Nongtalang

== Localities in Nongtalang ==
- Khlachympa
- Nongtalang Mission
- Banan
- Shnongklor
- New Nonglamin (New Nongtalang)
- Amsohmeheleng (New Nongtalang)
- Kordu (Amkor) (New Nongtalang)
- Remusan
- Shnongpdeng
- Tympang Club
- Amlariang
- Nongtalang Shnongthmai (New Nongtalang)
- Amsohmeheleng(New Nongtalang)
- Katdoh (New Nongtalang)

== Places of interest ==
The town is surrounded by hills and forests, and there are a number of waterfalls and the Rbang Amkhlew Living Root Bridge.

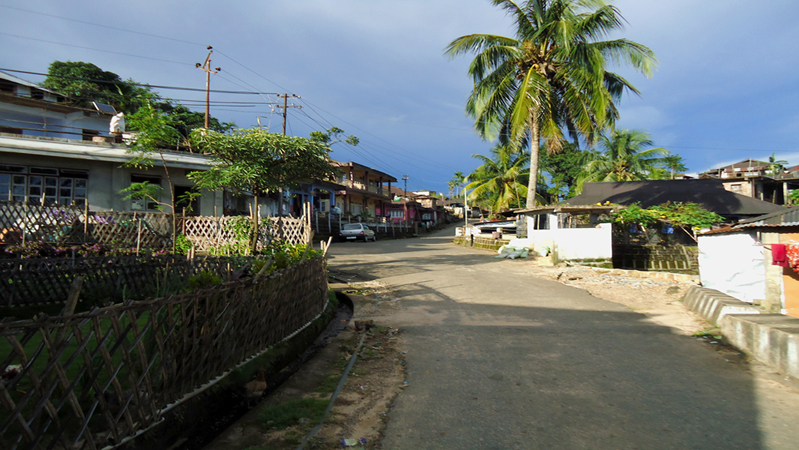
Nongtalang, Khlachympa, Trai Sohnekor 04-Aug-2014
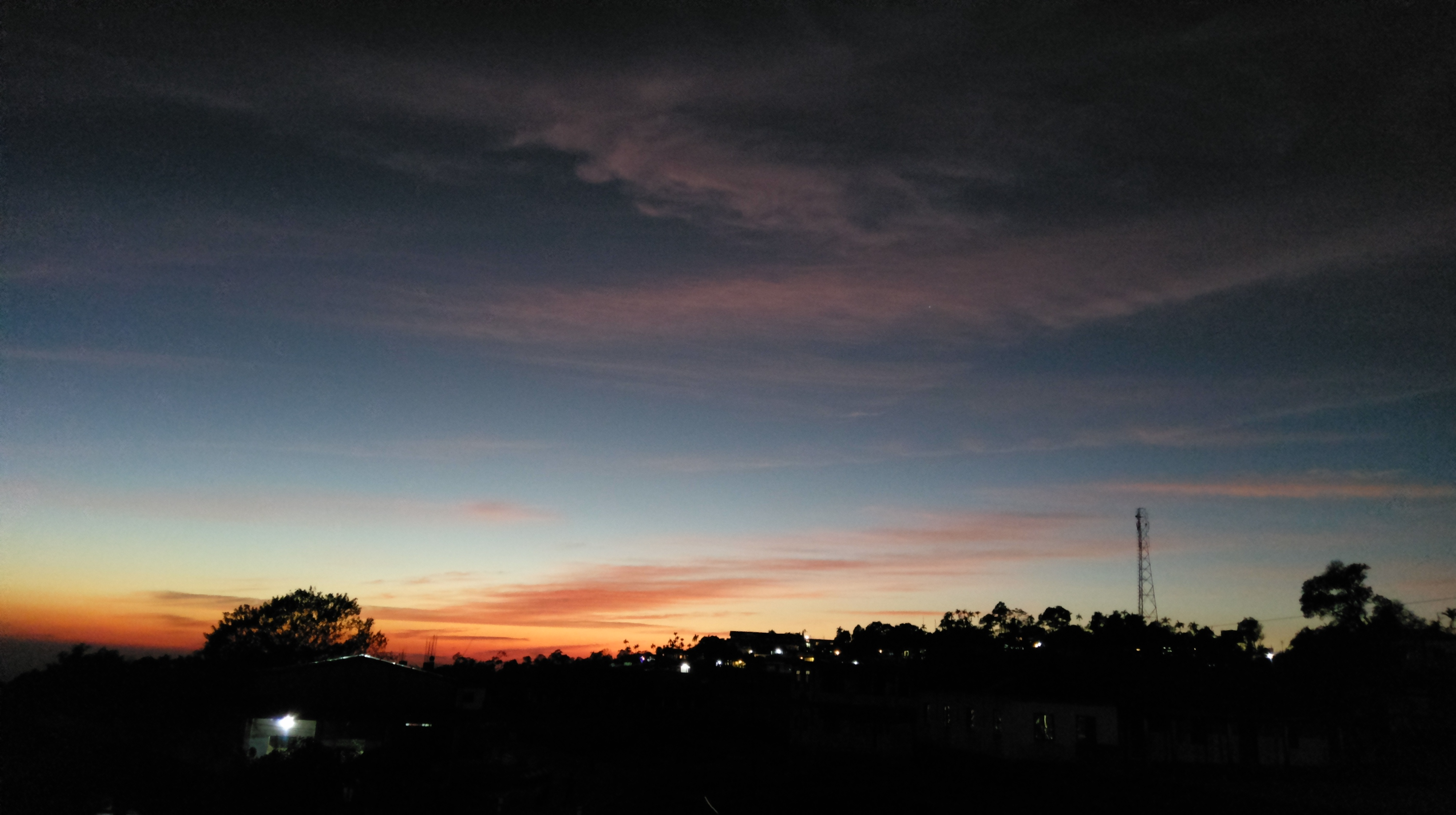
Nongtalang Town - Before Sunset on the 31-Dec-2017
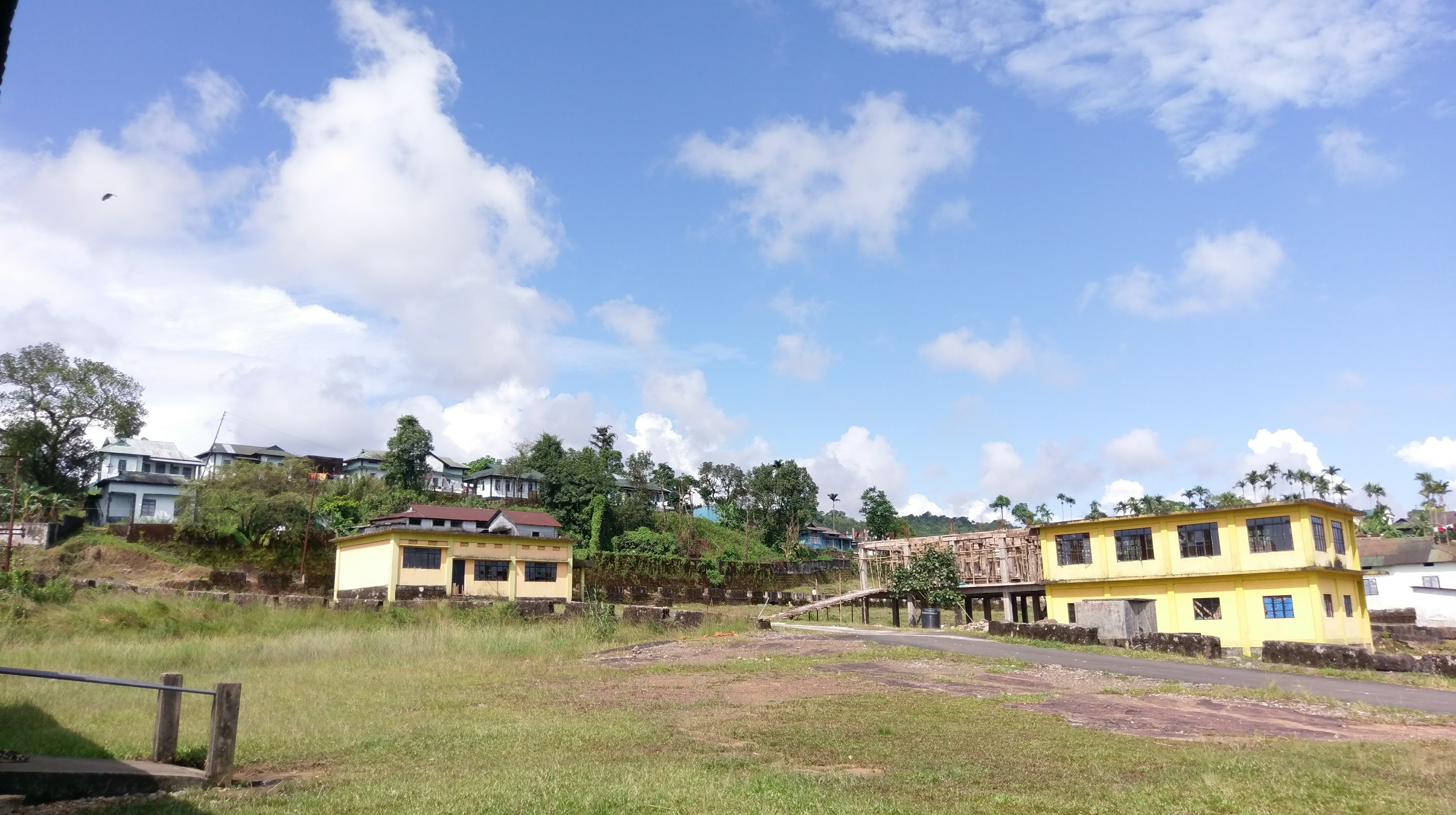
Nongtalang Town

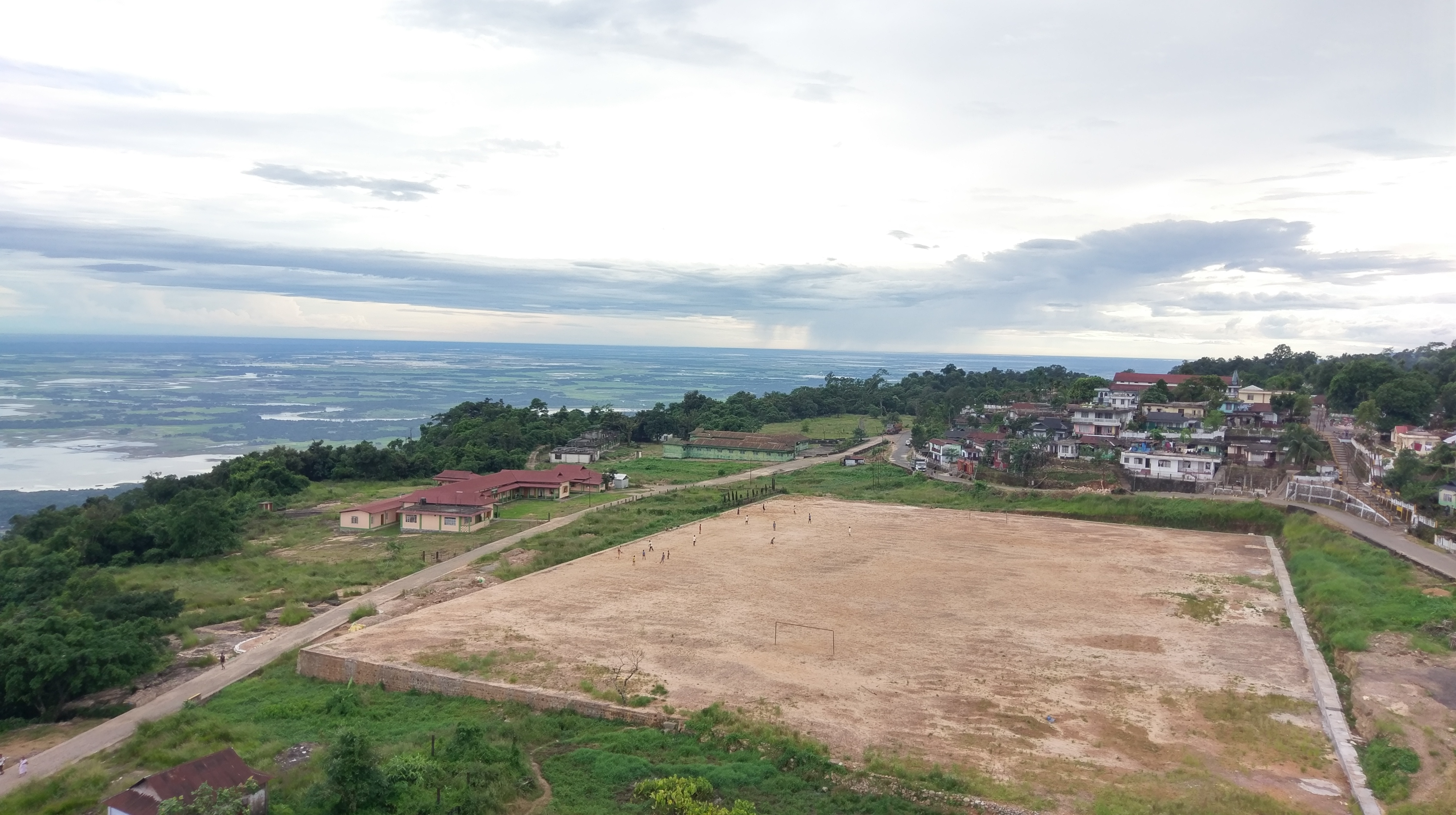
Birdseye View of Nongtalang Football Playground & Nongtalang Mission in Nongtalang Town. (shot on the Monday, August 20, 2018 Time:- 3:33 PM IST)
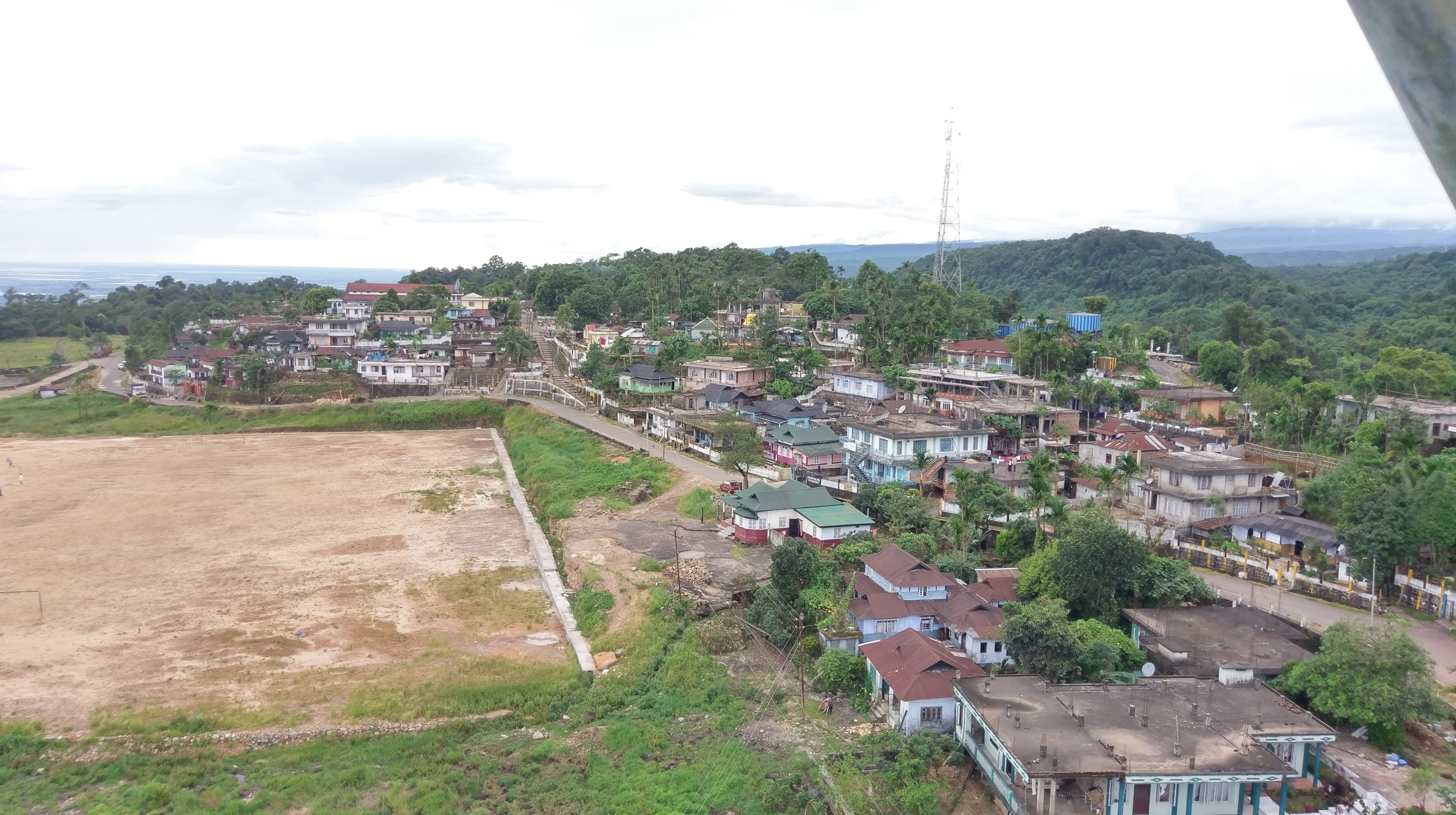
Birdseye View of Nongtalang Town. (shot on the Monday, August 20, 2018 Time:- 3:33 PM IST)
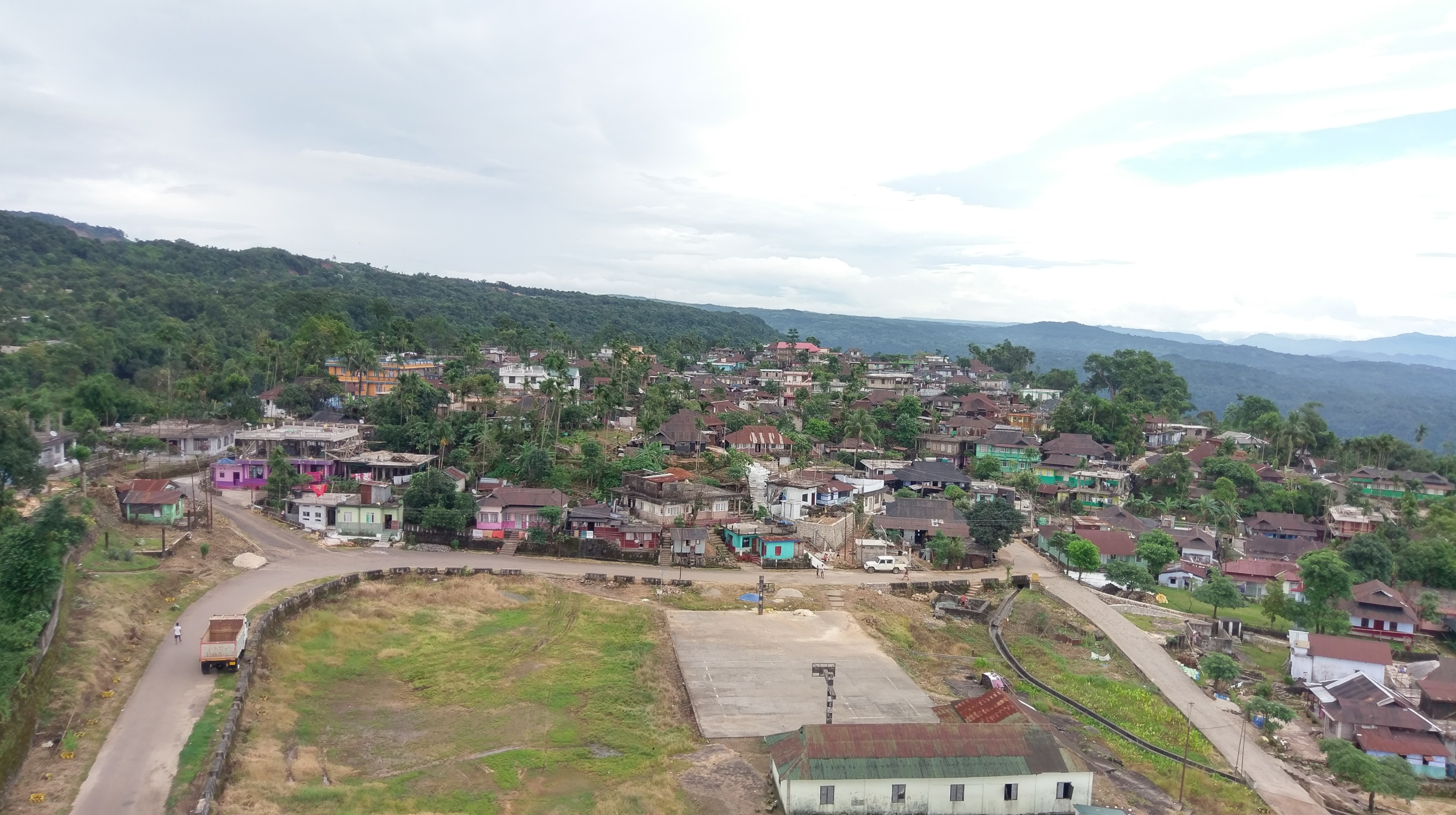
Birdseye View of Nongtalang Khlachympa at Nongtalang Town. (shot on the Monday, August 20, 2018 Time:- 3:34 PM IST)

== Health ==
The town is home to a number of educational institutions and Health care Centre like Nongtalang Community Health Center (CHC).
