= Lad Rymbai =

- town
- Location within Meghalaya Location within India
- Coordinates: 25°22′15″N 92°19′33″E
- Country: India
- State: Meghalaya
- District: East Jaintia Hills
- Block: Khliehriat
- Time zone: UTC+5:30 (IST)
- Postal code: 793160
- Climate: Cwa

Lad Rymbai is a town in the East Jaintia Hills district of Meghalaya, India. It is a coal mining site, located along the National Highway 44.

== History ==
Lad Rymbai is Jaintia for "junction to the Rymbai village". Originally, a small village, it emerged as a town with the completion of the National Highway 6, which made the village a transit point for vehicles operating between Guwahati and Silchar. The highway also made it possible for the businesses to exploit the local coal and limestone deposits, leading to the development of an unregulated mining industry.

== Economy ==
Lad Rymbai is an important market of the district, and is located at a distance of 30 km from Jowai.

== Demographics ==
The Pnar tribe are the native inhabitants of the village, which also attracts seasonal migrant coal workers from Bihar, Nepal and Bangladesh.

== Administration ==
Ladrymbai comes under the Khliehriat block and electoral constituency. The Ladrymbai post office serves the villages of Bataw, Mukhialong, Musniang, Rymbai, Sham Sham, Sohkhympher, Tuber Khamaishnong and Wapung.
