= Dawki =

Dawki Dauki
- town
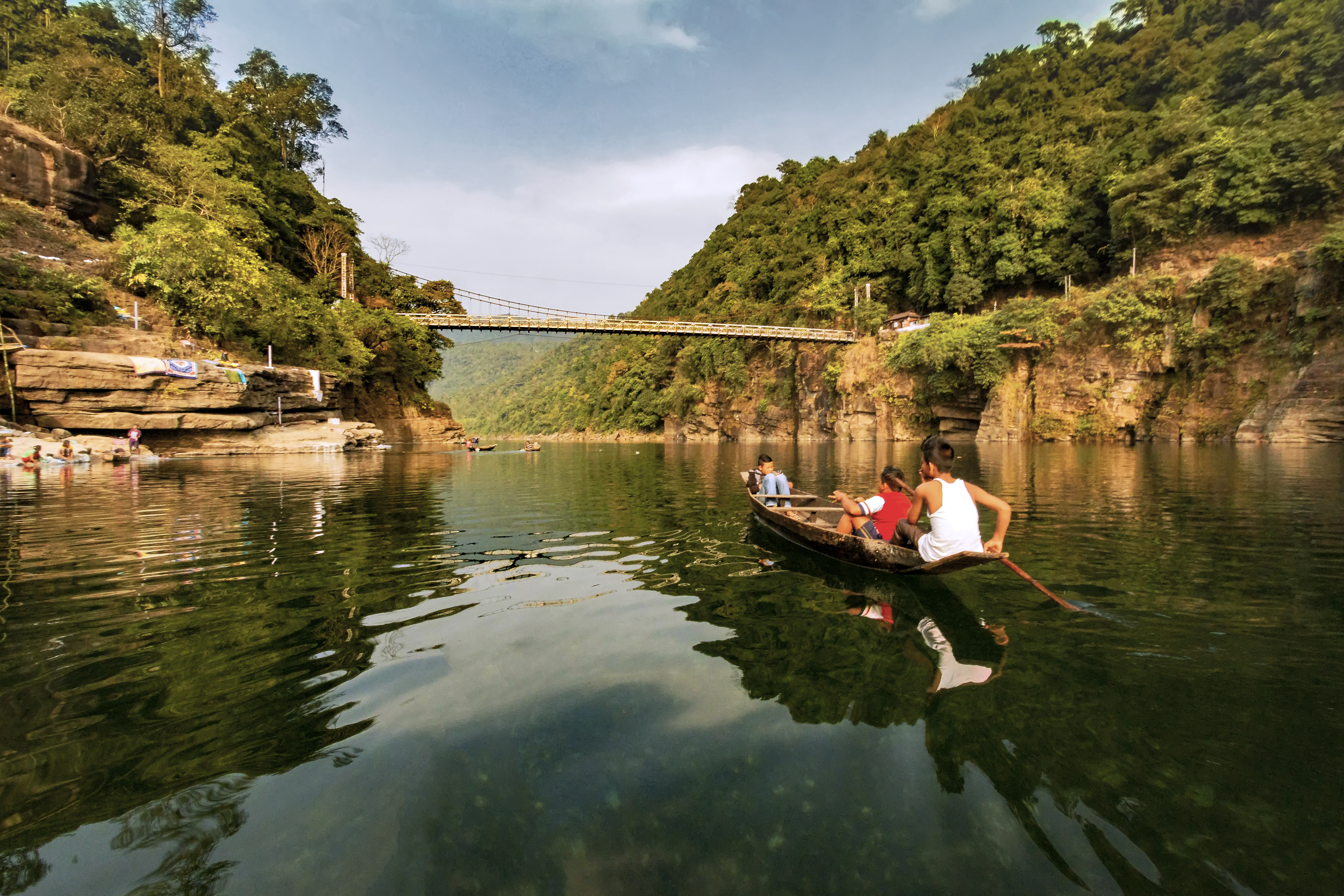
- Umngot river & Dawki Bridge in Dawki

- Location in Meghalaya, India Dawki (India)
- Coordinates: 25°11′0″N 92°1′0″E
- Country: India
- State: Meghalaya
- District: West Jaintia Hills

Languages
  - Official: War, Khasi, English
- Time zone: UTC+5:30 (IST)
- PIN: 793109
- Vehicle registration: ML
- Nearest city: Shillong, Jowai, Silchar

Dawki or Dauki is a town in West Jaintia Hills district, Meghalaya, India.

== Geography ==
It is located at 25°11′0″N 92°1′0″E, on the border between India and Bangladesh.

== Dawki Border-crossing ==
Dawki Integrated Check Post or Dawki border crossing is on Dawki-Tamabil is one of the few road border crossings between India and Bangladesh in West Jaintia Hills district in the state of Meghalaya, India, the corresponding post in Bangladesh is Tamabil post. Dawki ICP foundation stone was laid in January 2017 and will become operation in 2–18. It is used mainly for coal transportation to Bangladesh. Some 500 trucks cross the border every day in peak season.

Some shared transport is available from Iewduh in Shillong to the border post at Dawki every morning. Buses are also available for the 70 kilometres (43 mi) journey from Shillong. On the other side inside Bangladesh the Tamabil bus station, 1.5 kilometres (0.93 mi) away, has regular bus service to Sylhet 55 kilometres (34 mi) away.

== Places of interest ==
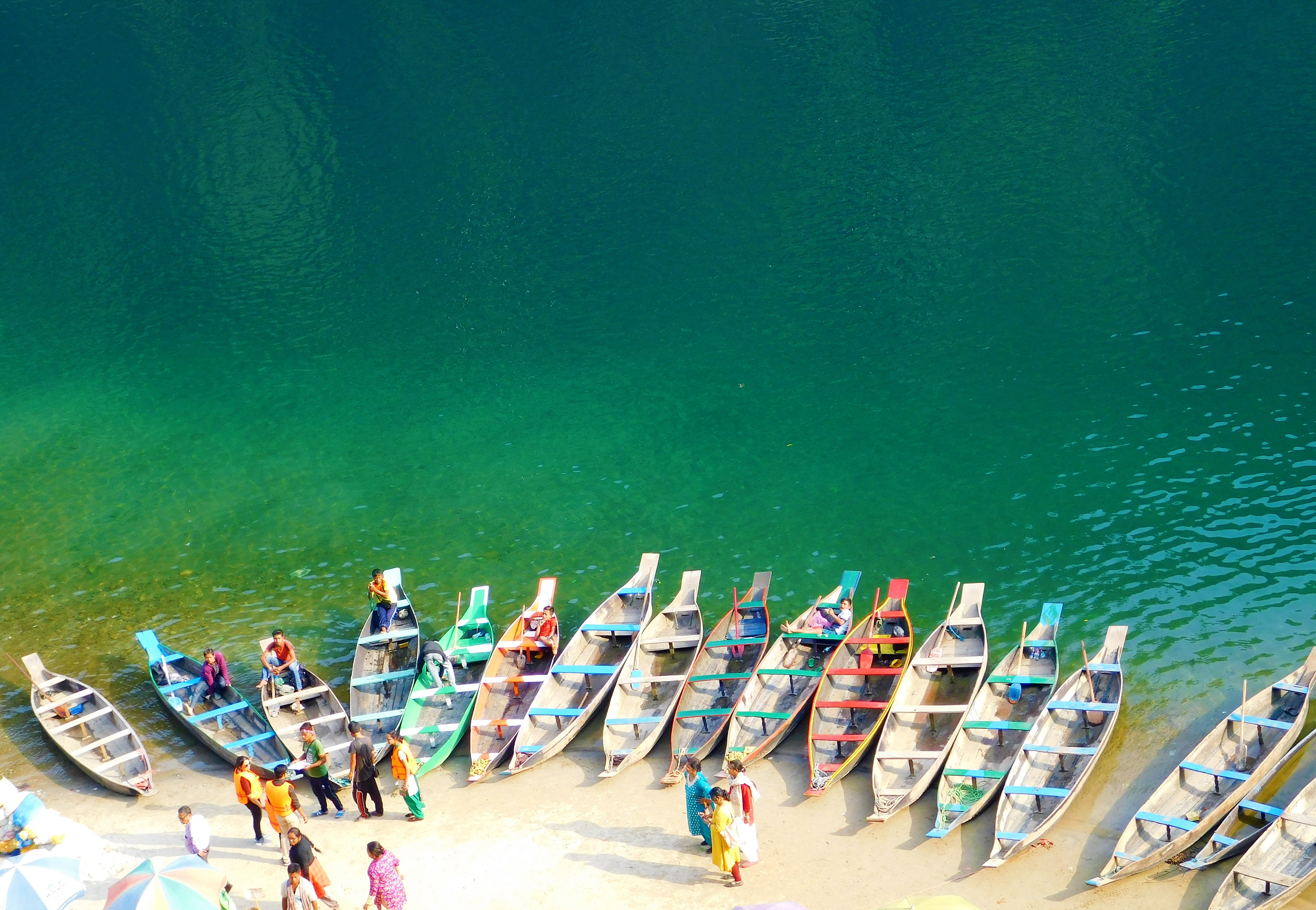
The Umngot River Boating at Dawki

Dawki Bridge is a suspension bridge over the Umngot River. It was constructed in 1932 by the British.

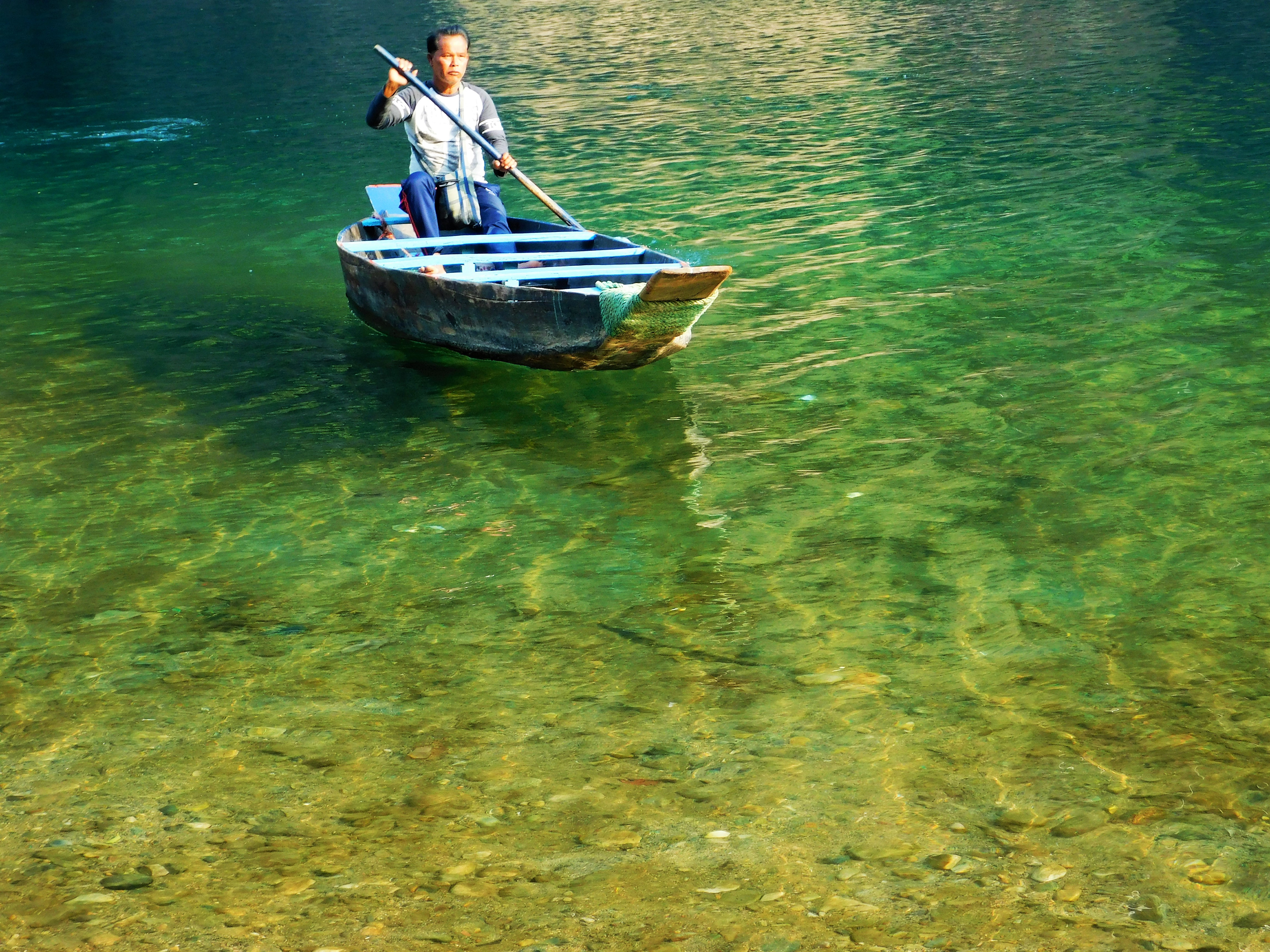
A man paddling a river boat in Umngot River

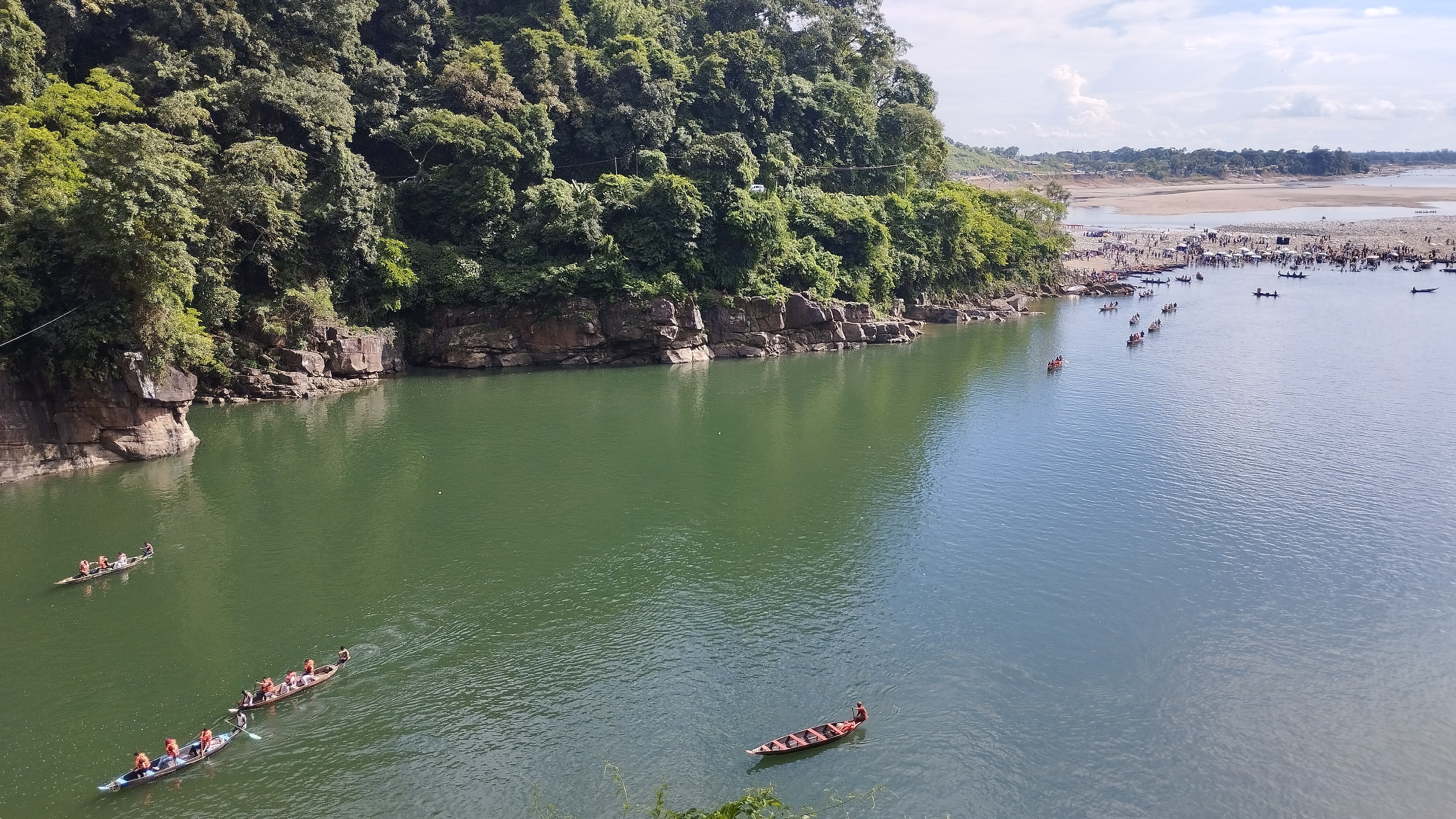
Boating at Dawki

== See also ==
- Living Root Bridge: suspension bridge created with living plant roots
