= Myntdu River =

Coordinates: 25.3876°N 92.2475°E

Location
- Countries: India, Bangladesh

Physical characteristics
- Source
  - location: Mihmyntdu, Jowai
  - elevation: 1,420 metres (4,660 ft)

Myntdu River is one of the major water bodies in Jaintia Hills District of the Indian State of Meghalaya, locally known as 'ka Tawiar ka Takan' (Our Guardian Angel) in the Pnar dialect. It is a blessing to the residents of the town of Jowai and adjacent places. Its abundant water is used to irrigate the Myntdu Valley, located on the outskirts of Jowai town.

The river, originating at 1,420 metres (4,660 ft) above sea level, is fit for hydro-power development.

== Sources ==
The river originates at a place called Mihmyntdu, adjacent to Jowai town. This river encircles Jowai on three sides excluding the northern part of town.

== Course ==
The river flows across Jowai, and then through Leshka (where a hydro project dam is being constructed) to reach the village Borghat, within Jaintia Hills, before finally entering Bangladesh, where it is locally called 'Shari'.

== Projects ==
The Myntdu-Leshka Hydro Project Dam (3X42 MW) built across the river, undertaken by MeECL, scheduled in three phases, is located at Leshka, West Jaintia Hills district, Meghalaya near Amlarem, the sub-division headquarters. The project cost is estimated to be around INR 360 crores.

== See also ==
- Jowai
