= Khasi and Jaintia Hills =

Mountainous region of northeastern India

Khasi-Jaintia Hills
- District of Assam Province, British India
- 1912–1947
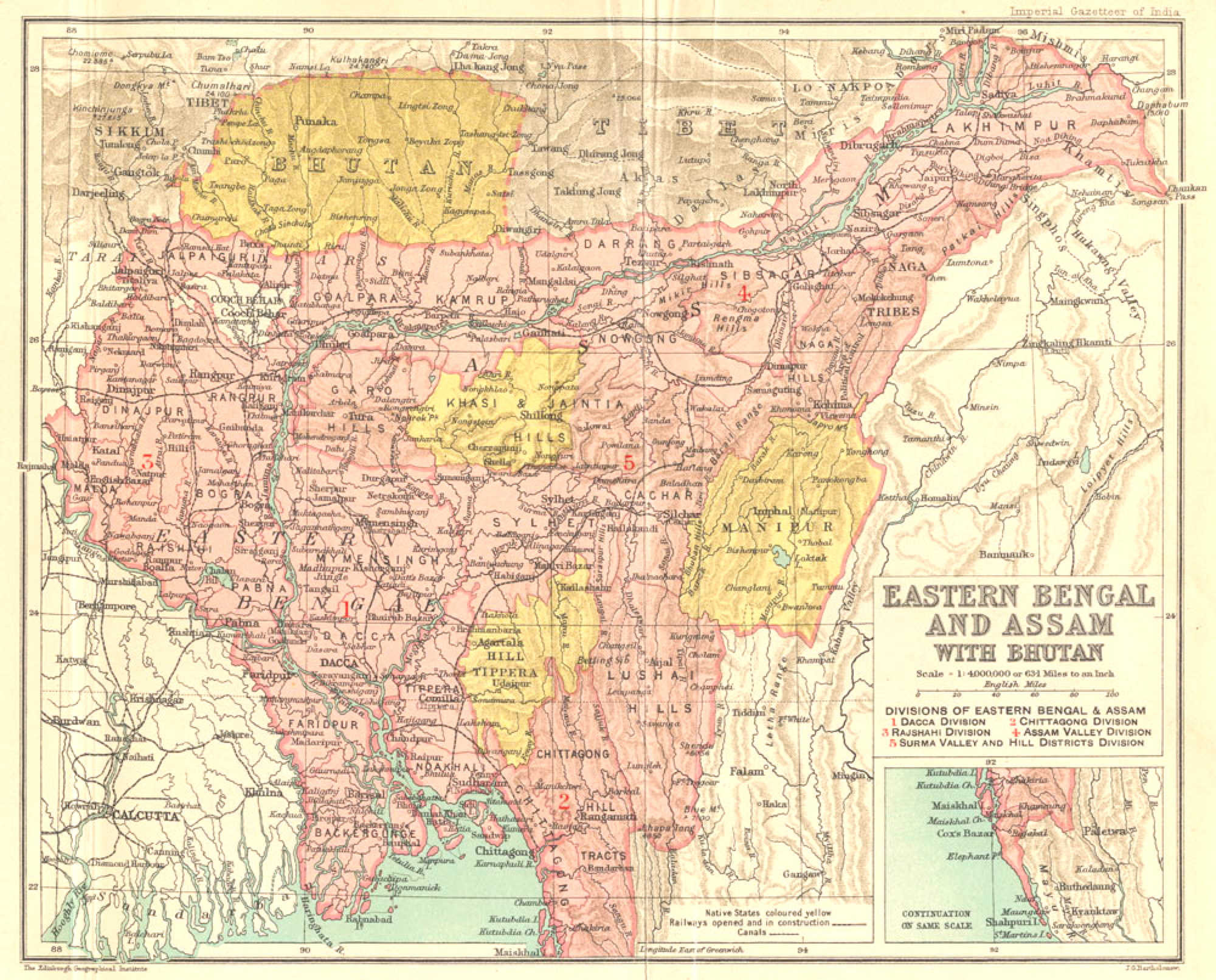
- The Khasi and Jaintia Hills in the Bengal Gazetteer, 1907
- Area
  - 1901: 15,947 km^{2} (6,157 sq mi)
- Population
  - 1901: 197,904
- History
  - Bifurcation of Eastern Bengal and Assam: 1912
  - Independence of India: 1947

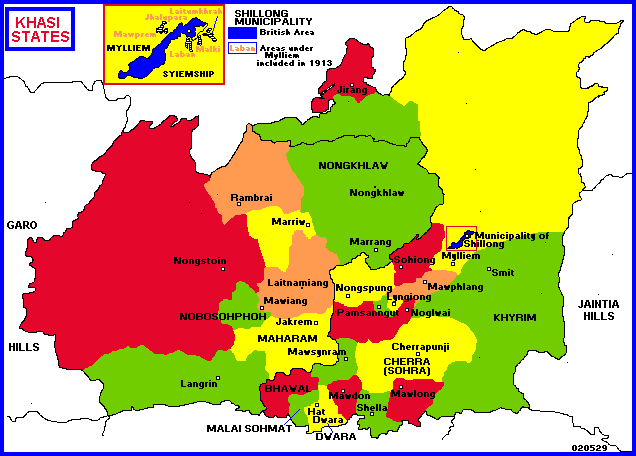
Khasi states, 1947

The Khasi and Jaintia Hills are a mountainous region in India that was mainly part of Assam and Meghalaya. This area is now part of the present Indian constitutive state of Meghalaya (formerly part of Assam), which includes the present districts of East Jaintia Hills district, headquarter Khliehriat, West Jaintia Hills district, headquarter Jowai, East Khasi Hills district, headquarter Shillong, and West Khasi Hills district, headquarter Nongstoin.

== Jaintia Hills ==
The Jaintia Hills are located further to the east from the Khasi Hills. The twelve Chiefs of the elaka (tribal province) of the Pnars, a Khasi Sub-tribe are styled Dolloi, and the land is called after them in Khasi: KA RI KHADAR DOLLOI ('Land of 12 Tribal Chiefs') - they are in Nartiang itself (see the Raja, uniquely also styled, as premier Chief: U Kongsong), and in Amwi, Jowai, Lakadong, Mynso, Nongbah, Nongjngi, Nongphyllut, Nongtalang, Raliang, Shangpung, Sutnga (see below; the Syiems).

Above them is the former princely Jaintia Kingdom. The kingdom's former winter capital, Jaintiapur is now in Bangladesh, while its summer residence shifted from Sutnga (where the former princely family started as Syiems) to Nartiang; also a palace in the commercial center Borghat in Meghalaya.

The Jaintia Hills used to be a part of the Jaintia Hills District. The district has been bifurcated into two separate districts, namely, East Jaintia Hills and West Jaintia Hills on 31 July 2012.

== Khasi Hills ==
The Khasi Hills are located east of the Garo Hills. The other Khasi tribes did not have princes but their twenty petty states (hima), and sometimes even smaller tribal divisions, are led by one or two Chiefs -selected in various ways- usually styled Siem, Syiem.

The names of these chieftainships are: Bhowal, Cherra (or Sohra; capital Cherrapunji), Dwara (capital Hat Dwara), Jirang, Khyri(e)m (capital Cherrapunjee, under a Radja), Langrin, Langïong, Maharam, Malai Sohmat, Marriw, Mawdon, Mawiang, Mawlong, Mawphlang, Mylliem (including Shillong city, the colonial capital of all Tribal Assam), Nobosohphoh, Nonglwai, Nongkhlaw, Nongspung, Nongstoiñ, Pamsanngut, Rambrai, Shella, Sohïong. or Sardar.
