= Shillong Municipal Board =

Agency overview
- Jurisdiction: Shillong, East Khasi Hills district, Meghalaya, India
- Headquarters: Bishop Cotton Road, Shillong-793001
- Agency executive: Shri Prafulla Kr. Boro, MCS, Chief Executive Officer
- Website: https://smb.gov.in/

Shillong Municipal Board (SMB) is the statutory civic body responsible for administering the city of Shillong in the East Khasi Hills district of Meghalaya, India. The Board is constituted under the Meghalaya Municipal Act 1973 (the Assam Municipal Act as adapted for Meghalaya) and is entrusted with urban local governance functions including public health, sanitation, water supply, street lighting, birth and death registration, licensing and other municipal services within the city limits.

== History ==
Shillong's municipal governance traces its statutory basis to the adoption and adaptation of the Assam Municipal Act for Meghalaya (now known as the Meghalaya Municipal Act), which provides the legal framework for municipalities and municipal boards in the State. The Shillong Municipal Board has evolved through periodic notifications and ward revisions notified by the state government; detailed lists of municipal notifications and ward orders are available in Meghalaya government legal repositories.

== Administration and governance ==
The Shillong Municipal Board administers the core city area of Shillong. The municipal wards include (but are not necessarily limited to) Laitumkhrah (multiple ward divisions), Malki, European, Police Bazaar, Jail Road, Mawkhar, Jaiaw, Mawprem, Kenches Trace, Laban, Lumparing and others as listed in municipal/press sources. Exact ward numbering and boundaries have been published by local authorities and in census/municipal documents.

The day-to-day administration of the SMB is managed by its officials and staff headed by the chief executive officer (CEO). As of the latest official listings, the CEO is Shri Prafulla Kr. Boro, MCS; the board also maintains an executive officer and departmental heads for public works, health, accounts and other functions.

The state government tried to hold elections to Shillong Municipal Board twice: once in 1998, and then in 2000. In 1998, only 5 out of the 27 wards were duly elected. These ward numbers were 8, 21, 23, 24 and 26. In 2000, only one nomination paper was filed but it was later withdrawn. As per a news report by The Sentinel, "the traditional tribal institutions and social organizations of the State are resisting polls to the Shillong Municipal Board."

As per a report by Praja, "there are traditional institutions of Dorbars (equivalent to wards) and the headman of the Dorbar is called the Rangbah Shnong. The headman is elected by the residents of the Dorbar by a show of hands every 5 years. The headmen are responsible for maintaining peace in the neighbourhood and for giving No Objection Certificate (NOC) to the residents for any relevant matter. The headmen are not recognised by the municipal board and report to the district council."

== Functions and services ==
The Shillong Municipal Board is responsible for standard municipal functions including:

- Public health and sanitation (street sweeping, drain cleaning, waste management);
- Water supply and maintenance of water connections;
- Registration of births and deaths and issuance of related certificates;
- Granting trade/business licences and regulation of markets;
- Maintenance of public infrastructure — roads within municipal limits, street lighting and public works;
- Implementation of state and central urban schemes within the municipal area.

== Recent initiatives ==
In 2025–2027 the Government of Meghalaya and the Shillong Municipal Board have been involved in a focused cleanliness and urban renewal campaign—branded “Mission Clean Shillong 2027”—aimed at improving waste processing, river clean-up, legacy waste remediation at Marten landfill, increased sanitation manpower and technology-enabled monitoring ahead of the National Games to be hosted in the state. The programme is being implemented with state-level coordination and SMB operational support.

== Revenue sources ==
The following are the Income sources for the corporation from the Central and State Government.

=== Revenue from taxes ===
Following is the Tax related revenue for the corporation.

- Property tax.
- Profession tax.
- Entertainment tax.
- Grants from Central and State Government like Goods and Services Tax.
- Advertisement tax.

=== Revenue from non-tax sources ===
Following is the Non Tax related revenue for the corporation.

- Water usage charges.
- Fees from Documentation services.
- Rent received from municipal property.
- Funds from municipal bonds.

== See also ==
- Shillong
- East Khasi Hills district
- Meghalaya Urban Development Authority
- List of urban local bodies in Meghalaya
- Garo Hills Autonomous District Council
