= Bhowal =

Bengali family name

- Pronunciation: bHaa- o -aal
- Language: Bengali

Origin
- Language: Bengali
- Meaning: Named after the Bhawal Estate of British India
- Region of origin: Origins are in the Padma and Brahmaputra river valley of the old Dhaka, Faridpur, Pabna in modern-day Bangladesh

Other names
- Variant form: Bhawal
- Anglicisation: Bhowal

Bhowal or Bhawal (Bengali: ভাওয়াল) is a Bengali surname of the Kayastha and Brahmins. The origin of this surname is unclear and various sources indicate various origins but all can be traced to same family history. Due to some mysteries regarding the family's history many films, novels, Jatras, songs and cultural references were made on the family history. They're found in North Western to Central Bangladesh and in Assam and West Bengal in India. Although the majority of the population migrated to India during the partition of India in 1947, followed by East Pakistan Genocides of 1950, 1954–1956, 1965, a minority of the population still resides in Bangladesh.

== Geographical Distribution ==
As of 2014, 2,879 known bearers of this surname were from India out of 3,010 people (approximately) in the World. Others include Bangladesh, United Arab Emirates, the United States, etc. where a good number of these people reside.
