= West Jaintia Hills district =

Coordinates: 25°27′N 92°12′E

- District of Meghalaya
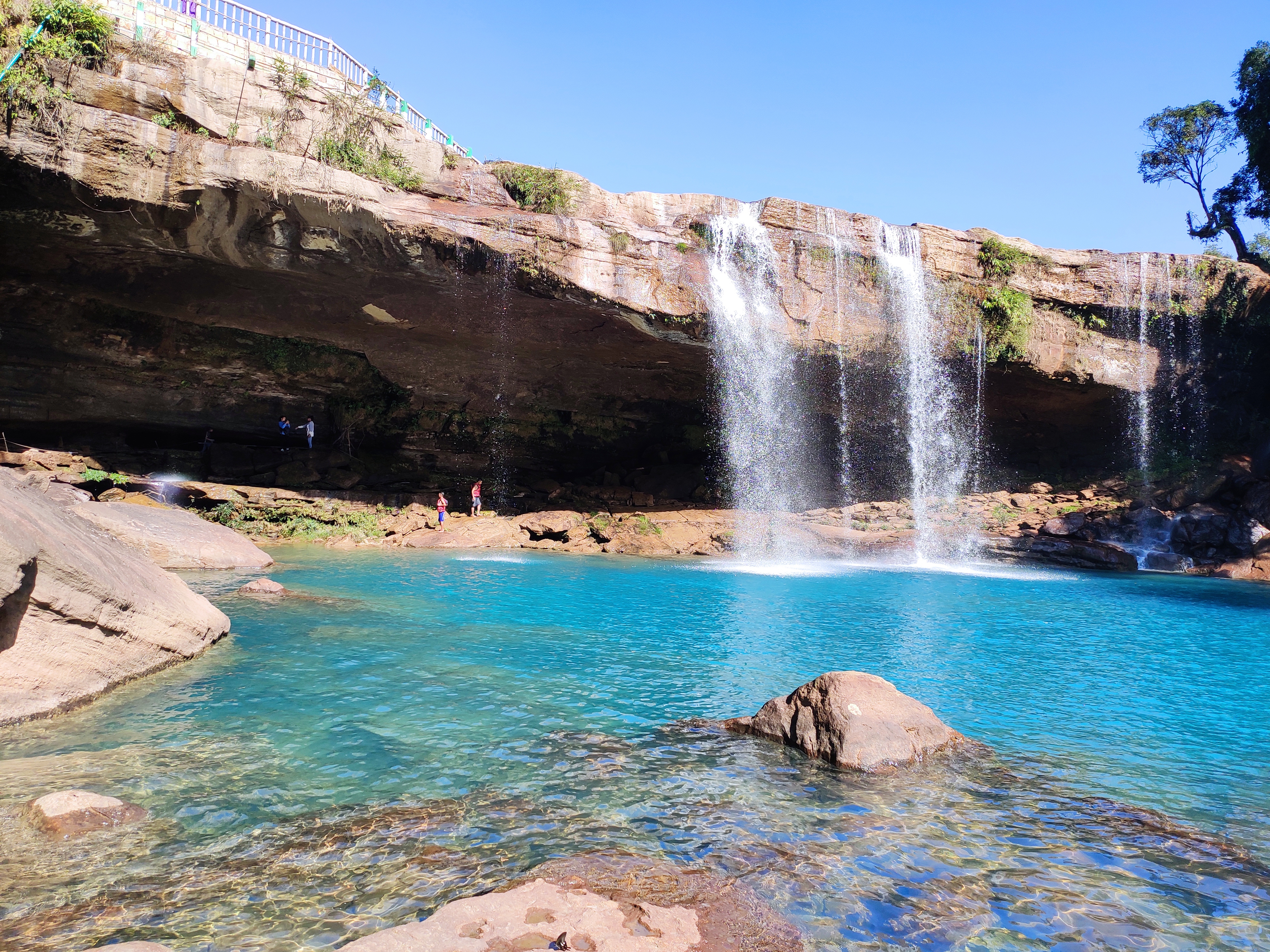
- Krang Suri Waterfalls
- West Jaintia Hills district Location in Meghalaya
- Country: India
- State: Meghalaya
- Headquarters: Jowai

Government
  - Vidhan Sabha constituencies: 4

Area
  - Total: 1,693 km^{2} (654 sq mi)

Population (2011)
  - Total: 272,185
  - Density: 160.8/km^{2} (416.4/sq mi)

Demographics
  - Literacy: 63.5%
- Time zone: UTC+05:30 (IST)
- Major highways: NH-44, NH-40
- Website: westjaintiahills.gov.in

West Jaintia Hills district (Pron: ˈʤeɪnˌtɪə) is an administrative District in the state of Meghalaya in India. The united district (Jaintia Hills District) was created on 22 February 1972 and occupied an area of 3819 km^{2}. It had a population of 272,185 (as of 2011). The district is part of the Meghalaya subtropical forests eco-region. With the bifurcation of the erstwhile Jaintia Hills District into East and West Jaintia Hills Districts, West Jaintia Hills District came into existence on 31 July 2012 with its headquarters at Jowai. Jowai is the host of all the heads of important governmental offices and establishments, educational institutions, hospitals, banking institutions, etc.

== Geography ==
The total area of the district is 1693 km^{2}. The district comprises one Civil Sub-Division Viz. Amlarem Civil Sub-Division and four Community and Rural Development (C&RD) Blocks viz. Amlarem C&RD Block, Laskein C&RD Block, Thadlaskein C&RD Block and Namdong C&RD Block with the following boundaries:

- North – Assam
- South – Bangladesh and East Jaintia Hills district
- East – Assam
- West – East Khasi Hills District

== Economy ==
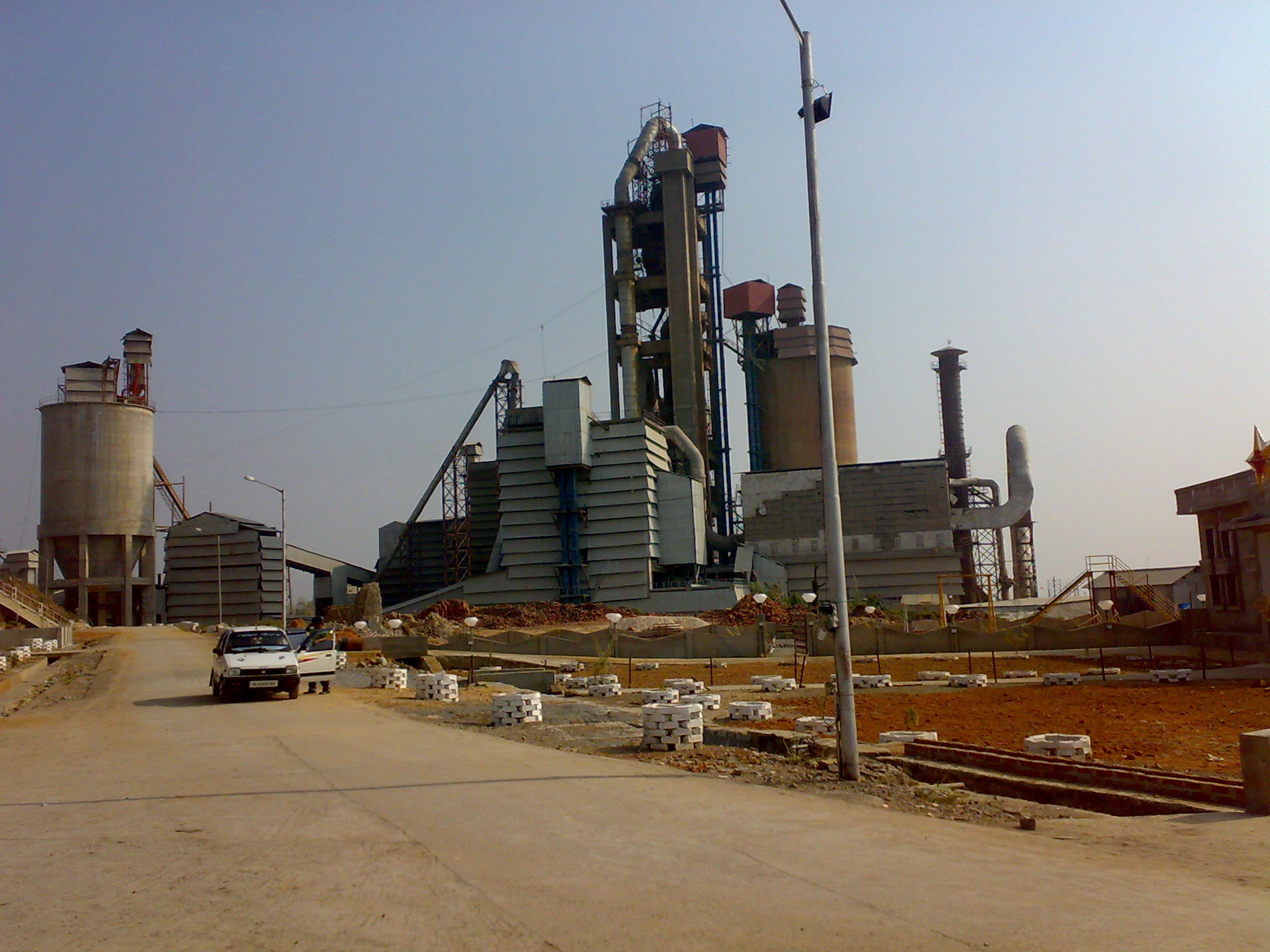
View of MCL Cement plant, Lumshnong, East Jaintia Hills

Although the mainstay of the district is agriculture, due to the abundance of limestone, plenty of cement factories have been set up in the district (now East Jaintia Hills). Coal mining at sites like Lad Rymbai (East Jaintia Hills district) is also one of the major activities. Most of the coal mining sites are now situated in the East Jaintia Hills district.

=== Agriculture ===
Lakadong Turmeric is a type of turmeric variety found in the West Jaintia hills district. It is one of the world's finest turmeric varieties with the highest curcumin content of 7-9 % in comparison to 3% or less in other turmeric varieties. It has been identified under the One District, One Product (ODOP) initiative of Indian government. The State of Meghalaya has also applied for a Geographical Indication tag for it.

== Divisions ==
=== Administrative divisions ===
United Jaintia Hills district was divided into five blocks. With the bifurcation of the erstwhile district, West Jaintia Hills is divided into three blocks:

Name	Headquarters	Population	Location
Amlarem	Amlarem	43,844	
Laskein	Laskein	90,402	
Thadlaskein	Mukhla Sohshrieh	1,37,939	

== Transport ==
Since it is a land locked region and lacks railways and an airport, the only means of transportation is roadways. The main highway which runs through the district is NH 6.

== Demographics ==
The district has a total population of 272,185, of which 134,406 are males and 135,946 are females. The density of population is 159.69 per km^{2}. Scheduled Tribes are 257,941 which is 94.76% of the population.

Religion in West Jaintia Hills (2011)
Religions
Christians	67.12%
Others*	28.40%
Hindus	3.50%
Other or not stated	0.98%
*Animists and ethnic religions

=== Languages ===
Languages of West Jaintia Hills district (2011)
1. Pnar (78.2%)
2. War (12.6%)
3. Khasi (6.64%)
4. Others (2.64%)

At the time of the 2011 census, 78.17% of the population spoke Pnar, 12.55% War and 6.64% Khasi as their first language.

The common dialect in West Jaintia hills is Pnar, closely related to Khasi. Other dialects include Khynriam in the western part of district and War in the southern part of the district.

== Culture ==
=== Places of interest ===
The places of interest in Jaintia hills include the below:

- Nartiang Durga Temple is a 600-year-old temple located in the West Jaintia Hills district of Meghalaya in northeastern India. It is one of the 51 Shakta pithas and is one of the holiest sites for devotees of the Shaktism sect of Hinduism.
- Monoliths in Nartiang - The garden of monoliths features a collection of large monoliths that were erected as monuments for the old Jaintia kings.
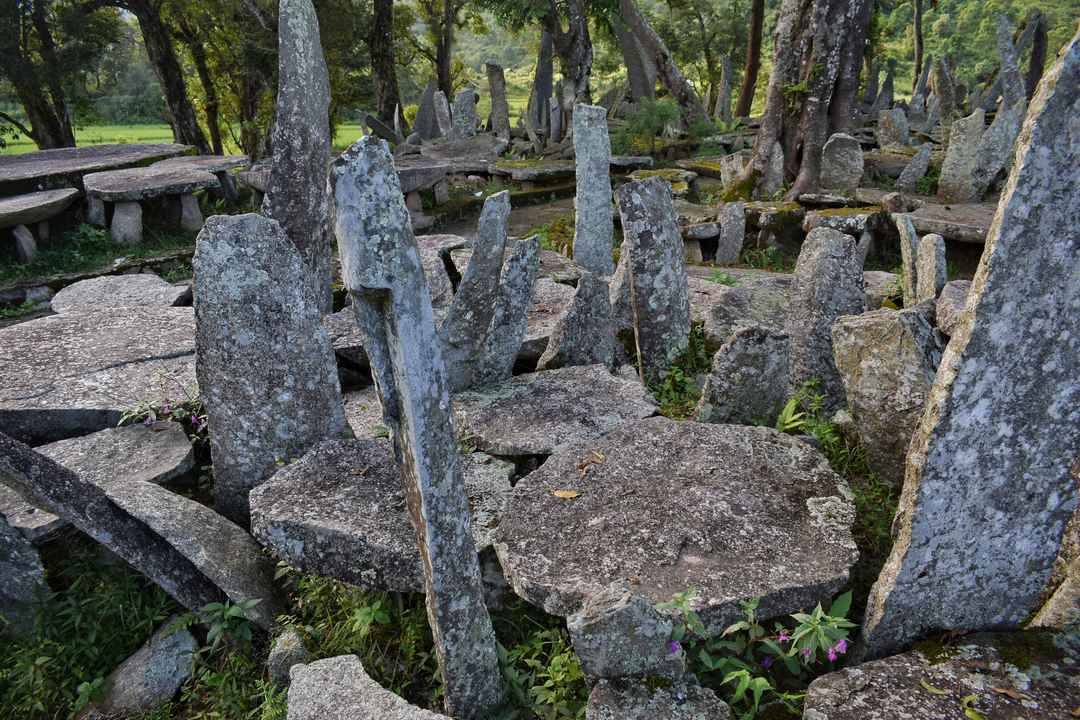
- Nartiang Monoliths.
  Megalithic Remnants - Nartiang: Nartiang was the summer capital of the Jaintia Kings, of Sutnga State. Huge monoliths, form a landmark in the village. The Nartiang menhir measures 27 feet 6 inches in thickness.
- Thadlaskein Lake: According to legend, this lake was dug with the ends of bows by members of 290 clans of U Sajar Niangli, a rebel general of Jaintia king, to commemorate the great exodus of the clans.
- Tyrshi Falls: located at about 8 km from the Jowai.
- Ialong Park: An ecological park with a view of the Pynthor Wah valley and the Myntdu river.
- Jowai Presbyterian Church
- Syntu Ksiar: Syntu Ksiar, which means 'golden flower' is a vast pool of calm water, where the river Myntdu which almost encircles Jowai, appears to come to a sudden halt. A valley well irrigated by the Myntdu River. Also called "Madan Madiah" or "Uncle's Ground," it is situated in the valley and has historical importance as the site of the freedom struggle's rise. Today, the ground has a monument of U Kiang Nangbah, a fighter of the Khasi people.
- Phe Phe Falls: a two-tiered, secluded waterfall in the lush hills, renowned for its refreshing, clear blue plunge pool at the base where visitors can swim after a moderate trek through the scenic trail
- Thlu Amwi Falls
- Krangshuri Falls: A tourist spot in Amlarem Sub-Division (War-Jaintia)
- Syndai: An important village of West Jaintia Hills which is famous for a number of caves and caverns in the limestone-borne area, used as hide-outs during war times between Jaintia Hills and foreign intruders.
- Kudengrim: known for wilderness, waterfalls, living root bridge, nature trails and more
- Dawki - Shnongpdeng: border town known for nature, swimming, fishing and camping

== Education ==
Prominent Colleges in West Jaintia hills includes Jowai Polytechnic which is an AICTE recognised college, the North East Adventist University (previously known as Assam Training School) and the only Nursing School in the district is Dr. Norman Tunnel Hospital School Of Nursing. There are other colleges too; namely Thomas Jones Synod College, Nongtalang College and Kiang Nangbah Govt. College Jowai which offers degree courses in arts and science. Jowai also has schools for Secondary and Higher Secondary level, some of the well known schools in Jowai are K.J.P Synod Mihngi Higher Secondary School, St Mary Mazzarello Girls Higher Secondary School, North Liberty Higher Secondary School etc.

== See also ==
- Hills States
