= Northeast Adventist University =

Coordinates: 25.4815°N 92.1703°E

North East Adventist University
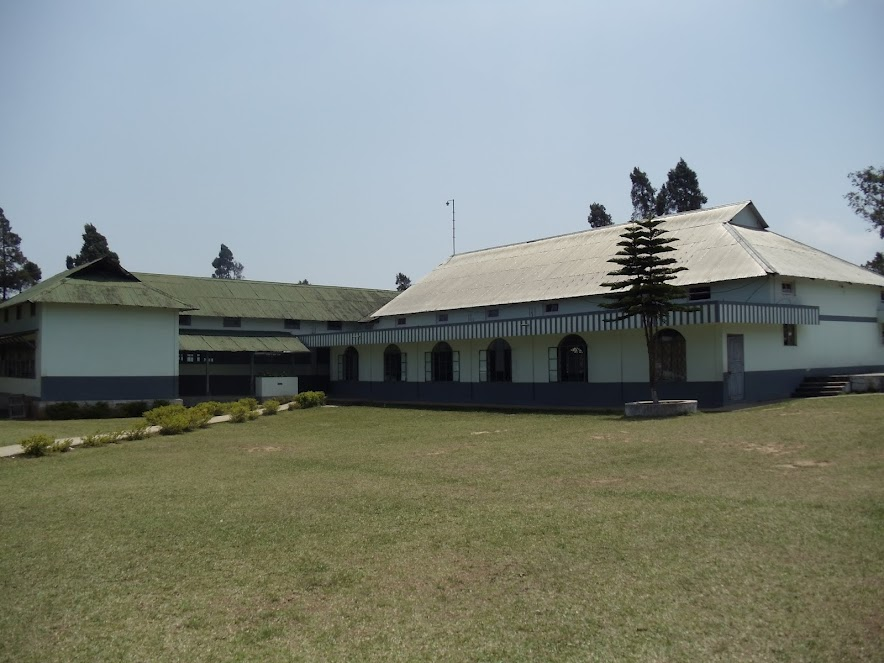
- Other name: NEAU
- Former name: ATS
- Motto: Education for Eternity
- Type: Private
- Established: 2020
- Chancellor: Prof. Eliah Srikakolli, PhD
- Administrative staff: c. 100
- Students: c. 1,000
- Location: Jowai, Meghalaya, 793151, India
- Campus: Rural
- Website: www.neauniversity.in

North East Adventist University is a Seventh-day Adventist institution of higher learning seven (7) km from Jowai, India. It is a part of the Seventh-day Adventist education system, the world's second largest Christian school system. This institution was affiliated to the North Eastern Hill University (NEHU) from 1999 till 2019. It was upgraded to University on 29 April 2019 under the Northeast Adventist University Act, 2015.

== History ==
North East Adventist University was established by Pr. O.W Lange in 1941 at the present location. It was then called the Assam Training School. It was inaugurated in 1942 by Sir Robert Reid, the Governor of Assam. When Meghalaya attained statehood in 1972, the name was changed to Adventist Training School (ATS). It served the people of East India and Northeast for many years as a Secondary School until it got upgraded to a Higher Secondary School in 1997, recognized by the Meghalaya Board of School Education (MBOSE).

== Campus ==
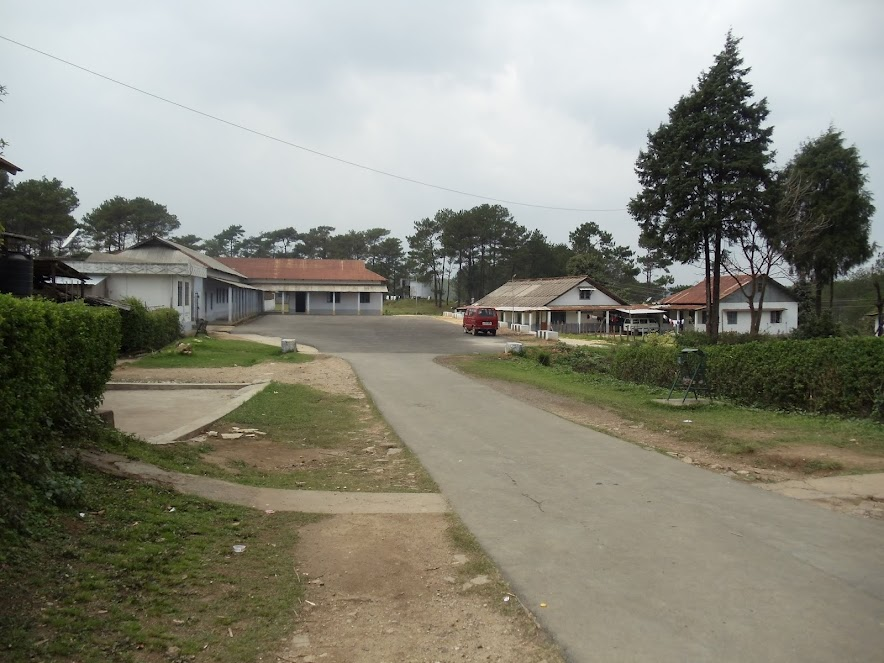
Northeast Adventist College

The university is located on the pine-wooded 89.94 acres (36.40 ha) hills of Khliehtyrshi at Thadlaskein, seven km (4.3 mi) from Jowai town, Meghalaya, India. The NH 44 passes just in front of the Main gate.

== Degree Courses ==
The university offers education in the Arts and Humanities, Science, Health, Allied Science and Management & Commerce streams in the University. The campus also boost of Arts, Commerce and Science Streams in the Higher Secondary section.

Arts

- Department of English
- Department of History
- Department of Sociology
- Department of Political Science
- Department of Education
- Department of Health and Sciences
- Department of Allied Science

== See also ==
- List of Seventh-day Adventist colleges and universities
- Seventh-day Adventist education
- Seventh-day Adventist Church
- Seventh-day Adventist theology
- History of the Seventh-day Adventist Church
