= Jowai Polytechnic =

Jowai Polytechnic, Jowai
- Type: Government Institute, Diploma Level
- Established: 2002
- Faculty: 21
- Students: 270
- Location: Ladthadlaboh, Jowai, Meghalaya, India; 25.454°N 92.209°E
- Campus: Urban, 11.73 acres (0.0475 km^{2})
- Website: www.jowaipolytechnic.in

Jowai Polytechnic was established in 2002, by the Government of Meghalaya, as a polytechnic college. It is an AICTE recognised college and currently offers diplomas in 3 disciplines.

== Campus ==
The college is located at Ladthadlaboh, Jowai in a sprawling campus. The campus includes the main academic building and the labs. Also it has the residential quarters for the faculty and staffs and hostels for the students.

== Diplomas courses offered ==
The college currently offers diplomas in 3 disciplines.

- Costume Design & Garment Technology
- Automobile Engineering
- Architectural Assistantship
