= Thadlaskein Lake =

Lake in Meghalaya, India

Coordinates: 25.497°N 92.173°E

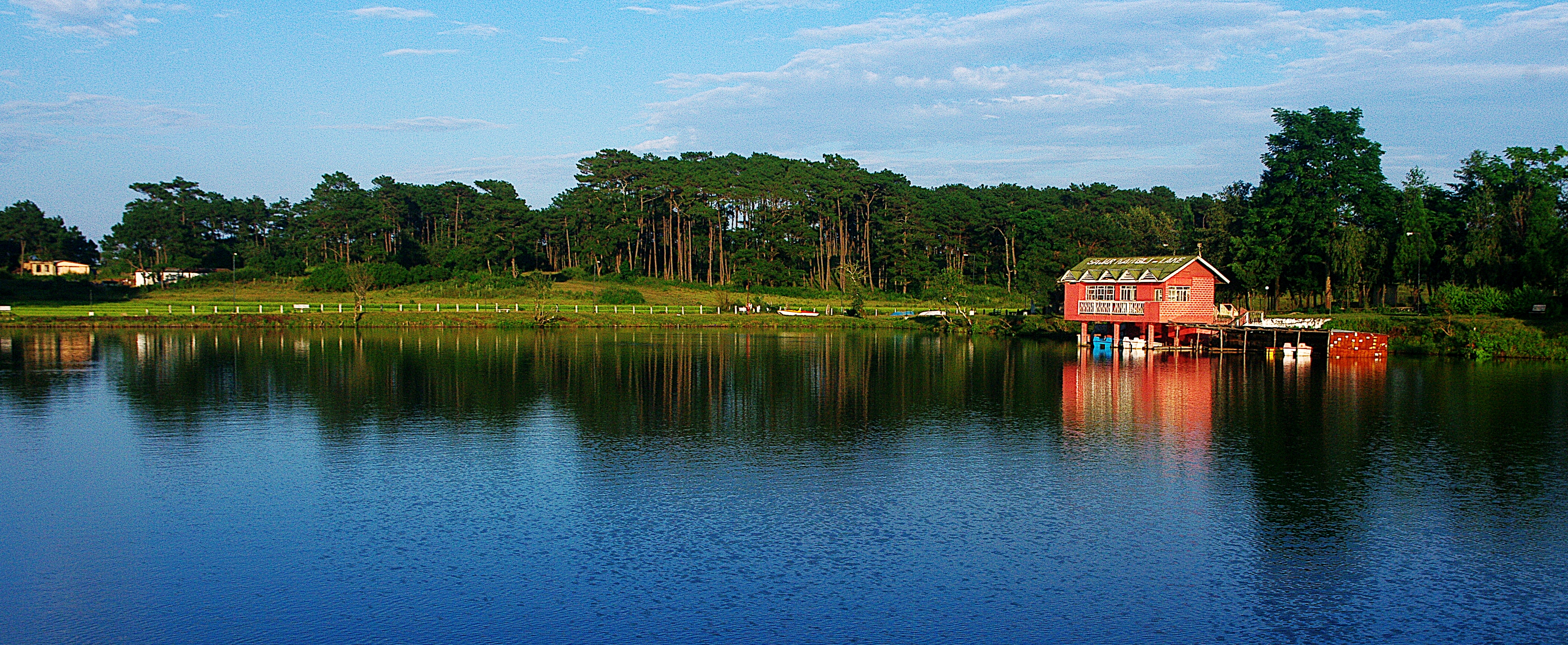
Thadlaskein Lake

Thadlaskein Lake, also Pung Sajar Nangli, is a man-made historical lake in Meghalaya, India. It is on National Highway 6 next to a small village called Mukhla.

A folktale says that in the middle ages a young man named Sajar Nangli and his followers created it by digging.
