= Jowai =

Jowai Jwai
- Town
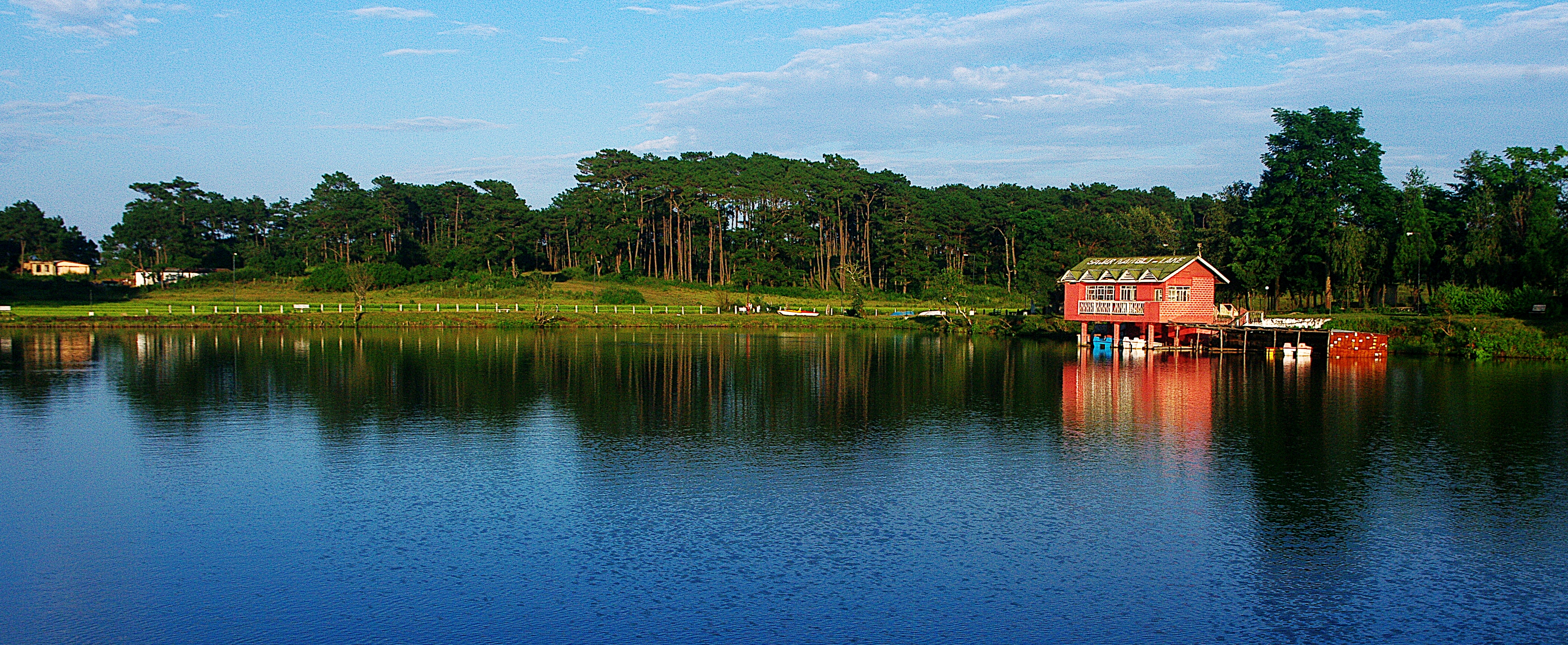
- The serene Thadlaskein Lake is located at the outskirts of Jowai town

- Location in Meghalaya, India Jowai (India)
- Coordinates: 25°26′31.761″N 92°11′40.977″E
- Country: India
- State: Meghalaya
- District: West Jaintia Hills

Government
  - MLA: Wailadmiki Shylla (NPP)
  - MP: Mr. Ricky AJ Syngkon (VPP)
- Elevation: 1,380 m (4,530 ft)

Population (2011)
  - Total: 28,430
  - Density: 77/km^{2} (200/sq mi)

Languages
  - Regional: Pnar, Khasi
- Time zone: UTC+5:30 (IST)
- PIN: 793 150
- Telephone code: 91 03652
- Vehicle registration: ML-04
- Climate: Cwb

Jowai (IPA: ʤəʊˈwaɪ) is the headquarters of the West Jaintia Hills district of the state of Meghalaya, India, and is home to the Pnar, a sub-tribe of the Khasi people. It is located on a plateau surrounded on three sides by the Myntdu river bordering Bangladesh to the south (about 50 km from the Indo-Bangladesh border). Due to its high altitude of 1365m above sea level, Jowai experiences warm summers with cool to chilly winters.

Jowai is an important business and education hub for the entire district, catering to local students as well as those from the adjacent parts of Assam and Bangladesh. It is well equipped with infrastructure including schools, colleges, hospitals, and a postal service. As with the Nongphlang (Khynriams), Pnars too have a matriarchal society where daughters inherit the family property.

== Connectivity ==
Jowai is well connected by roadways to Shillong, which is 64 km away. The town of Jowai lies on National Highway 44 (NH 44) which connects Assam, Meghalaya, Tripura, Mizoram and parts of Manipur, specifically Lamka (Churachandpur), where Highway NH 44 is the sole link to it.

A few buses operate along this route. The district's most popular modes of transport are the Tata Sumo and the Tata Indica, which function on a shared passenger basis. The charge for traveling from Shillong to Jowai by either a Tata Sumo or Tata Indica is र100, with fairly good availability throughout the day.

The district has no rail or air links. The nearest rail service is in Guwahati, Assam, about 160 km away, serving many destinations. Umroi Airport (E.K Mawlong Airport), the nearest airport, has a service with limited flights to Kolkata.

== Tourist spots ==
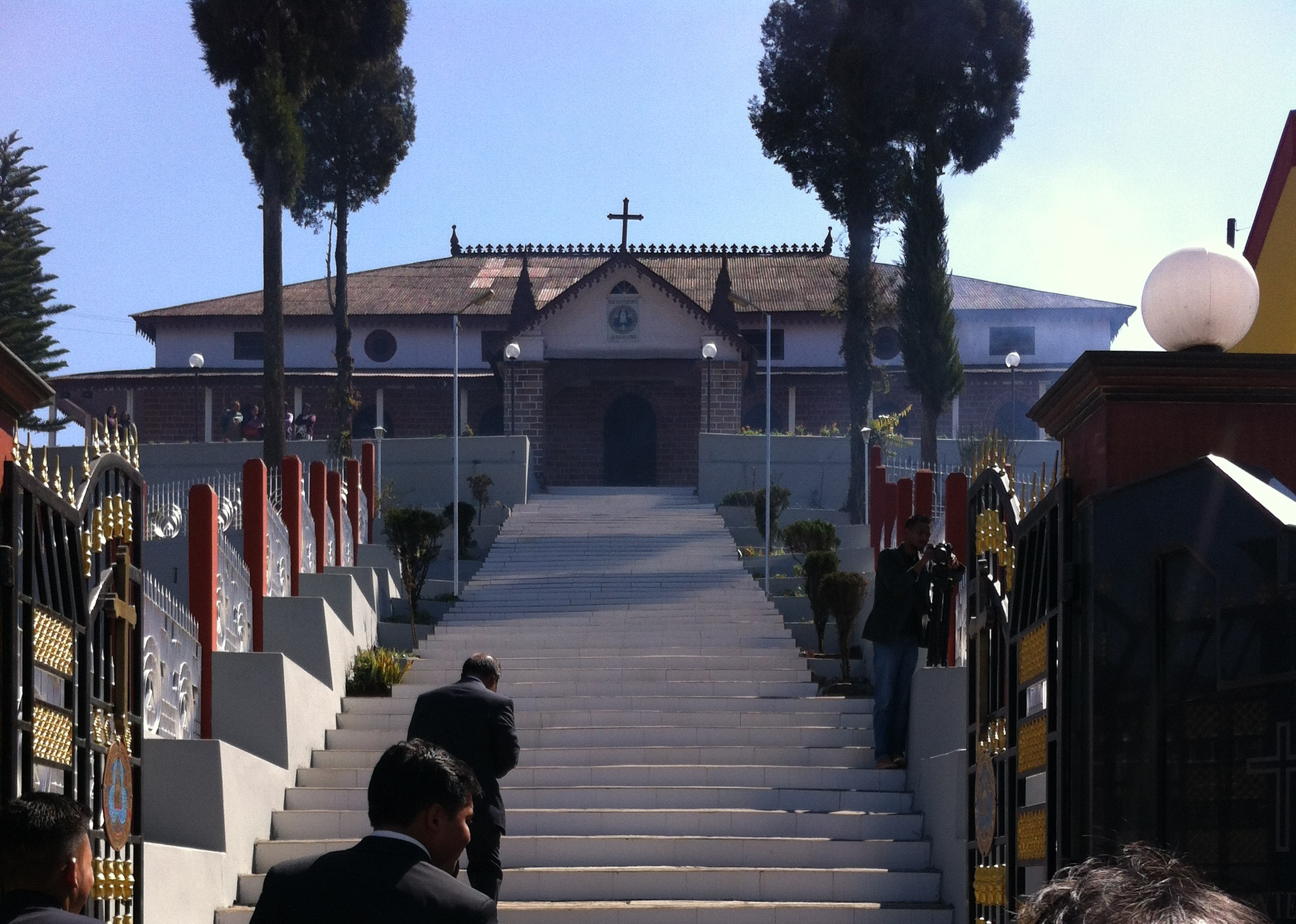
Jowai Presbyterian Church, India

The town is relatively quiet with respect to tourism. Most tourist attractions are a short distance from town, except for the "Iaw Musiang", one of the oldest market areas in the district. Jowai Teer is also one of the popular gambling sports in Jowai. Its origins are unknown.

Jowai Presbyterian Church is the oldest church in Jaintia Hills, built by the Welsh Presbyterian Mission in the latter part of the 19th century. It is one of the few structures in town that retain British architectural influence.

Other Nearby attractions include:

- Nartiang Durga Temple is a 600-year-old temple located in the West Jaintia Hills district of Meghalaya in northeastern India. It is one of the 51 Shakta pithas and is one of the holiest sites for devotees of the Shaktism sect of Hinduism.
- Monoliths in Nartiang - The garden of monoliths features a collection of large monoliths that were erected as monuments for the old kings.
- Megalithic Remnants - Nartiang: Nartiang was the summer capital of the Jaintia Kings, of Sutnga State. Huge monoliths, form a landmark in the village. The Nartiang menhir measures 27 feet 6 inches in thickness.
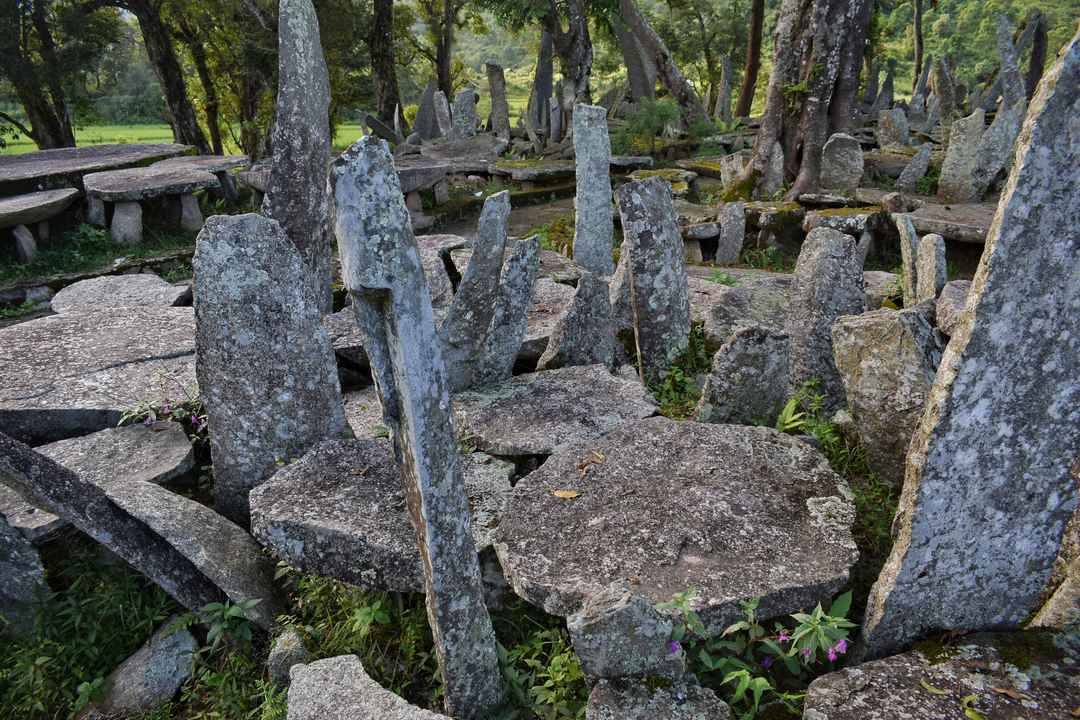
  Nartiang Monoliths.
- Thadlaskein lake – A popular tourist spot. It was dug by Sajar Nangli, a follower of the former Jaintia King. According to a legend, this lake was dug with the ends of bows by members of 290 clans of U Sajar Niangli, a rebel general of Jaintia king, to commemorate the great exodus of the clans.
- Tyrshi Falls – A waterfall located at approximately 8 km from the heart of Jowai.

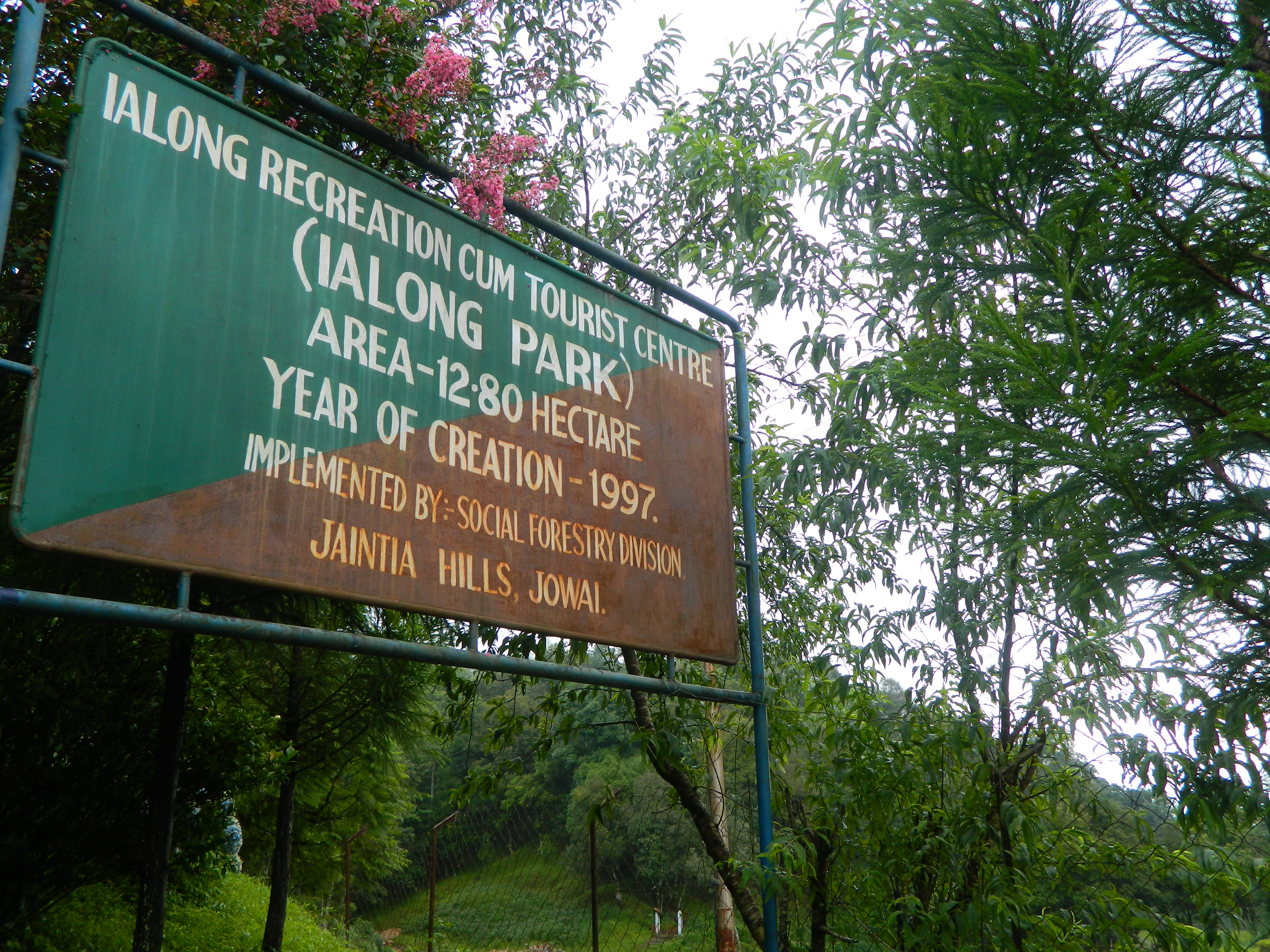
Ialong Park

- Ialong Park – An ecological park with a view of the Pynthor Wah valley and the Myntdu river.

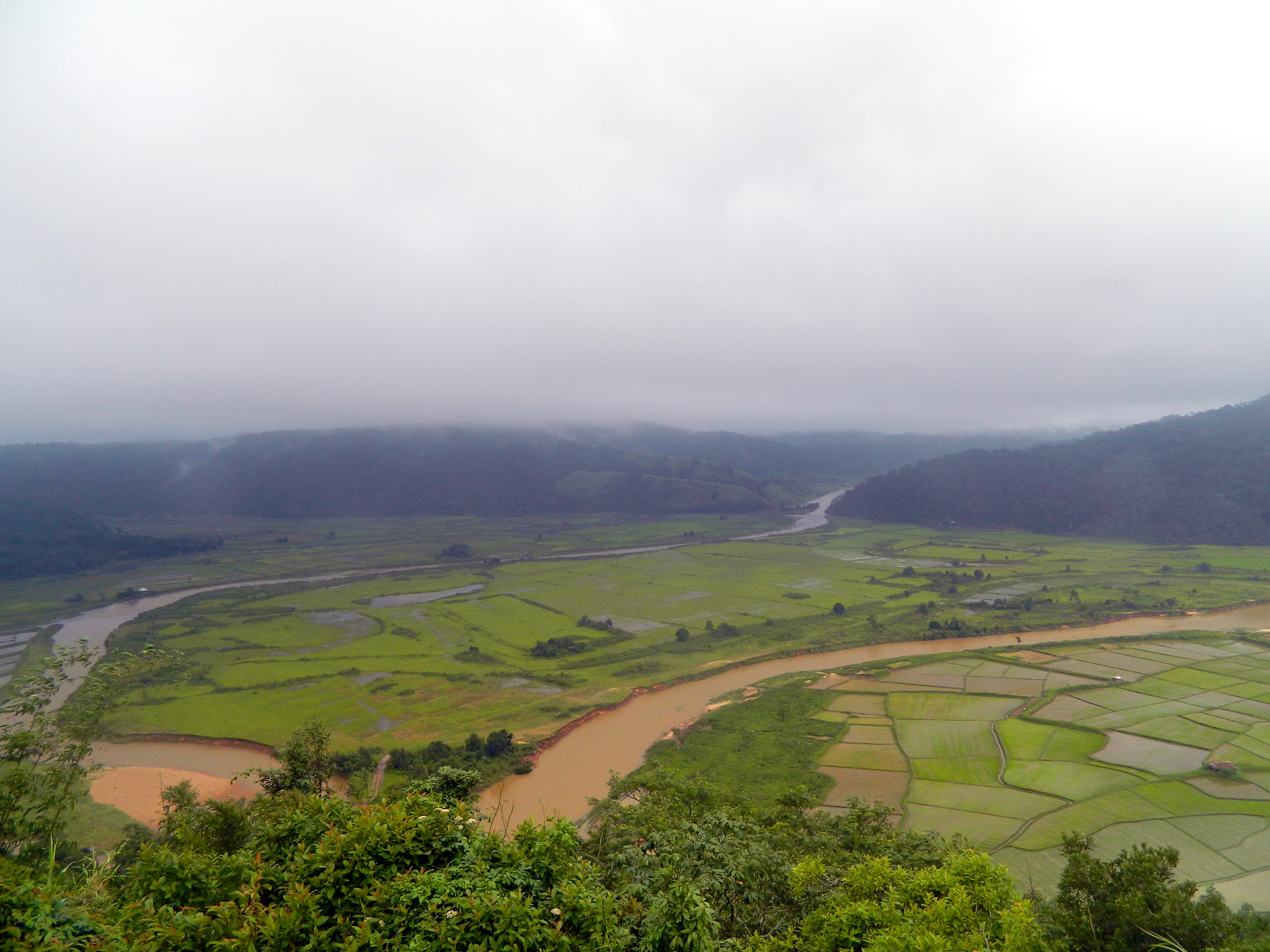
Ialong Park

- Syntu Ksiar – A valley well irrigated by the Myntdu River. Also called "Madan Madiah" or "Uncle's Ground," it is situated in the valley and has historical importance as the site of the freedom struggle's rise. Today, the ground has a monument of U Kiang Nangbah, a fighter of the Khasi people.
- Phe Phe Falls: a two-tiered, secluded waterfall in the lush hills, renowned for its refreshing, clear blue plunge pool at the base where visitors can swim after a moderate trek through the scenic trail
- Thlu Amwi Falls
- Krangshuri Falls: A tourist spot in Amlarem Sub-Division (War-Jaintia)
- Syndai: An important village of West Jaintia Hills which is famous for a number of caves and caverns in the limestone-borne area, used as hide-outs during war times between Jaintia Hills and foreign intruders.
- Kudengrim: known for wilderness, waterfalls, living root bridge, nature trails and more
- Dawki - Shnongpdeng: border town known for nature, swimming, fishing and camping

== Festivals and food ==
Behdeinkhlam, a major festival of the Pnars, is a 4-day event that takes place during the month of July. "Behdienkhlam" literally means "to drive away evils and plague." It is a festival celebrated in all parts of Jaintia Hills. Today, local Christians usually do not participate in it, but it is celebrated with pomp and show amongst followers of the traditional Niamtre religion. This festival is associated with a series of religious rites. Dancing takes place in the street to the accompaniment of drums and pipe playing. Although women do not participate in dancing, they have an important role to play at home by offering sacrificial food to the spirits of the ancestors.

Each locality prepares a decorative tower-like pillar structure called a rath, carried by 30 to 40 strong people to a small lake at Aitnar for immersion. The festival culminates when the khnong (the most sacred tree) is brought to the centre of each locality.

In the afternoon, Datlawakor, a form of soccer with a wooden ball, is played between two teams from the upper and lower valleys of the Myntdu River. Those in the team who wins are believed to be blessed with a good harvest.

Other festivals include Laho Dance and Chad Sukra.

Meat and fish, particularly pork, are delicacies. A variety of savoury pork dishes like Jadoh, Doh Khleh, Doh Jem and Doh Snam, are prepared according to traditional recipes. Chicken, fresh fish, and beef are also among the dishes prepared in a unique style distinct from usual curries. A strong smelling Tungtoh, made from fermented beans, and Tungtap, a variant of dry fish, are two of the most popular forms of local chutney.

== Demographics ==
Languages spoken in Jowai town (2011)
1. Pnar (92.8%)
2. Hindi (1.73%)
3. Bengali (1.60%)
4. Nepali (1.24%)
5. Garo (0.54%)
6. Others (2.11%)

The major inhabitants are the Pnar people. Other inhabitants include Nongphlang (Khynriams), War, Biates, Karbis, Marwaris, Bengalis, and Nepalis.

As of the 2001 India census, Jowai had a population of 28,430. Males constitute 49% of the population and females 51%. Jowai has an average literacy rate of 76%, higher than the national average of 59.5%; male literacy is 77%, and female literacy is 75%. In Jowai, 17% of the population is under 6 years of age.

Religions in Jowai (2011)
1. Christianity (63.7%)
2. Niamtre/Niam Khasi (30.2%)
3. Hinduism (4.75%)
4. Islam (0.98%)
5. not stated (0.27%)
6. others (0.10%)

== Politics ==
Governance in the ancient Jaintia Kingdom was in the form of the Jaintia king (Syiem) from their capitals at Jaintiapur and Nartiang, with Jaintia Ministers (Dollois) each ruling over a specific "Elaka" (geographical region). The Dollois held high positions in society as well as in the Syiem's court. With the advent of the British rule, the Syiem was ripped off his position, with the Dollois left with some limited powers. Jaintia Hills is divided into twelve Elakas, each under a Doloi (nominal ruler).

Apart from the ancient form, people of Jaintia Hills have their representatives in the Meghalaya Legislative Assembly seated at the capital, Shillong. The present Member of the Legislative Assembly from 2-Jowai Constituency is Mr. Wailadmiki Shylla, National Peoples' Party.

Jaintia Hills District also has its own Autonomous Council as per the provisions given in the Sixth Schedule of the Constitution, known as Jaintia Hills Autonomous District Council (which is separate from the Khasi Hills Autonomous District Council, which is seated at Jowai town itself). Jowai town has four members of district council constituencies. They are:

1. Madonbai Rymbai (25-Amwi Khliehtyrshi MDC Constituency)
2. Marki Mulieh (27-Jowai North MDC Constituency)
3. Moonlight Pariat (28-Jowai Central MDC Constituency)
4. A.Shullai (29-Jowai South MDC Constituency)

At the national level, the area falls within the Shillong parliamentary constituency. The current Member of Parliament is Ricky A. J. Syngkon, elected in 2024, who replaced the previous MP Vincent Pala. The MP is seated in New Delhi and represents constituents from the region, including those residing in Shillong.

The upcoming MLA Election is scheduled to be held in 2018 followed by the MDC and MP Elections in 2019.

== Institutions in Jowai ==
=== Technical institutes ===
- Jowai Polytechnic

=== Nursing institutes ===
- Dr. Norman Tunnell Hospital School of Nursing

=== Colleges and institutions providing higher studies ===
- Kiang Nangbah government college
- Khad-ar Daloi Law College
- Thomas Jones Synod College
- Northeast Adventist College

=== Prominent schools and higher secondary institutions ===
- North Liberty Higher Secondary School
- KJP Synod Mihngi Higher Secondary School
- Seinraij higher Sec School
- Govt. Boys Higher Secondary School
- Govt. Girls Higher Secondary School
- Tome Memorial Secondary School
- Marian Hill Higher Secondary school
- St. Mary Mazarello Girls Higher Secondary School
- Little Angels Secondary School
- Jowai Public school
- HK Singh Secondary school
- Faith academy Secondary School
- Che's Star Secondary School
- Jaintia Eng Secondary School
- Little Flower Secondary School
- Amwi Secondary School
- Jowai District Presbyterian School
- All Saints Diocesan School

== Localities in Jowai ==
- Dulong
- Panaliar
- Loom Pyrdi Iongpiah
- Loom-iong-Kjam
- Loom Kyrwiang
- Tpep Pale
- Chilliang Raij
- Umshyniar
- Lumpariat
- Ladthadlaboh
- Caroline Colony
- Dongmihsngi
- New Hill
- Tyndowapung
- Mynthong
- Chutwakhu
- Moosalyngkat
- Mooralong
- Memory Colony
- Mookyrdup
- Khim-u-sniang
- Tympang Iaw Musiang
- Mission Compound
- Salaroh
- Riat Siatsim
- Khlieh Myngkrem
- Salini Colony
