= Religion in Bangladesh =

Religion in Bangladesh (2022 Census)
1. Islam (91.0%)
2. Hinduism (7.95%)
3. Buddhism (0.61%)
4. Christianity (0.30%)
5. Other religions (0.12%)

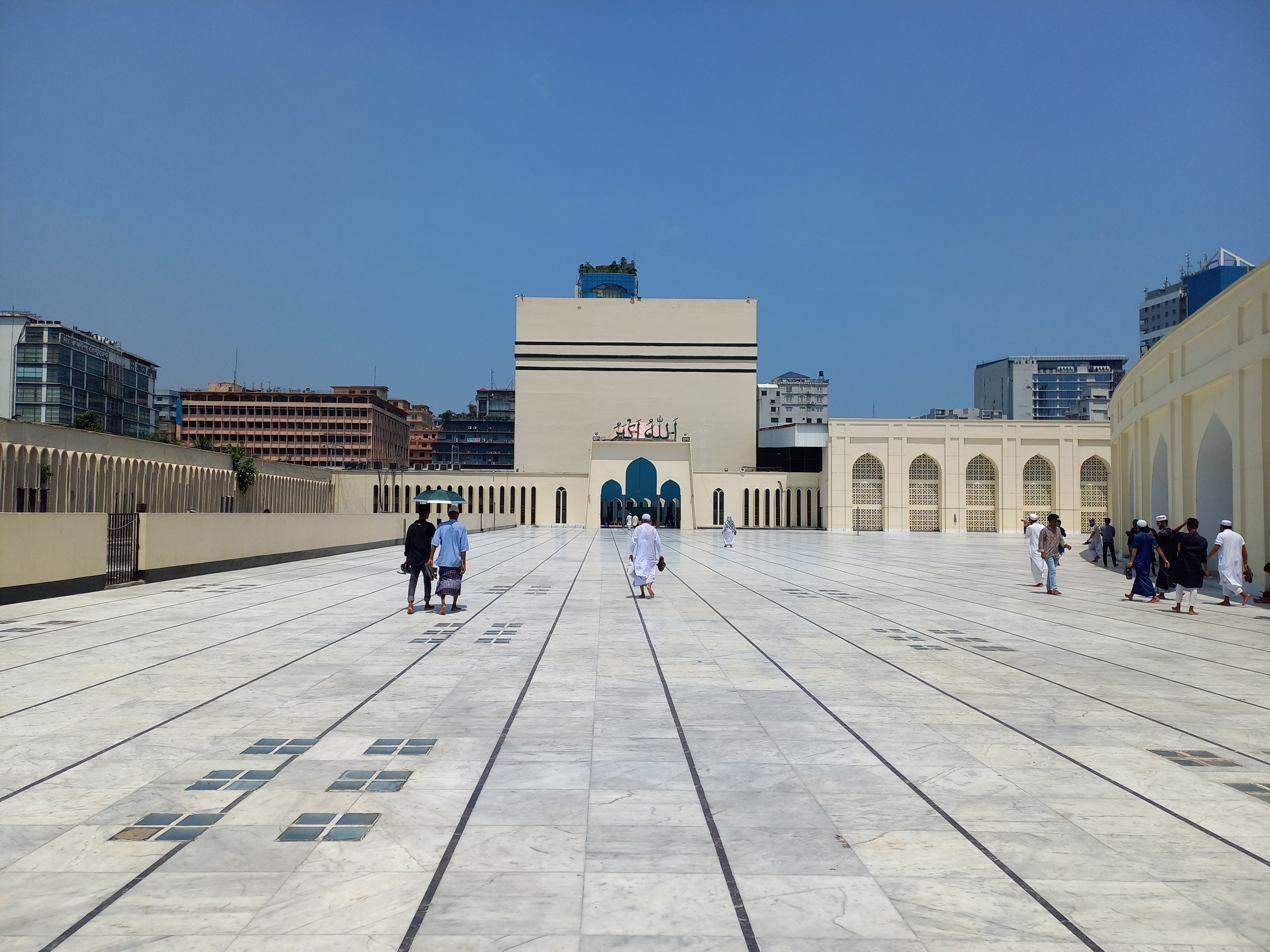
Baitul Mukarram, Dhaka

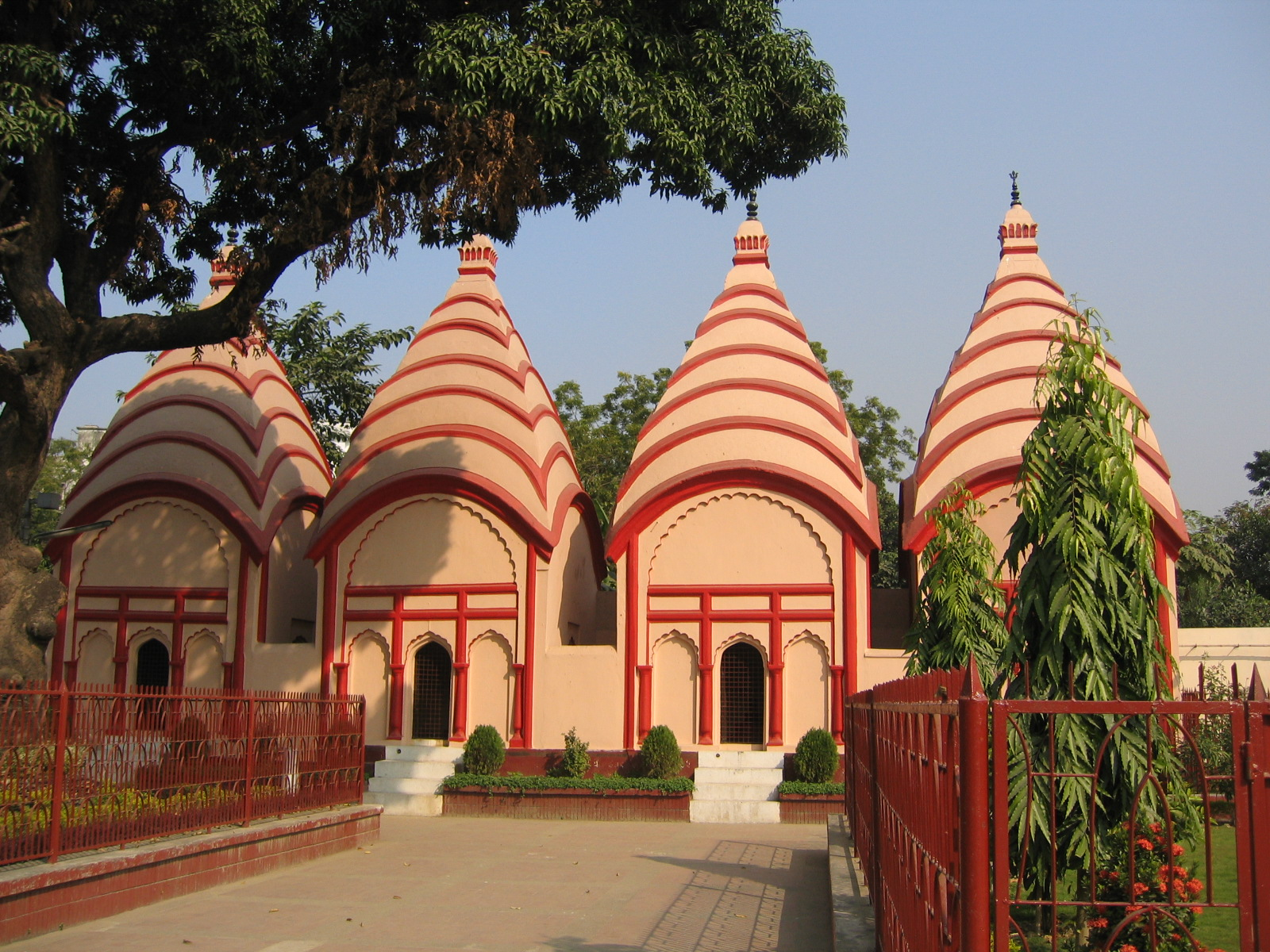
Dhakeshwari National Temple, Dhaka

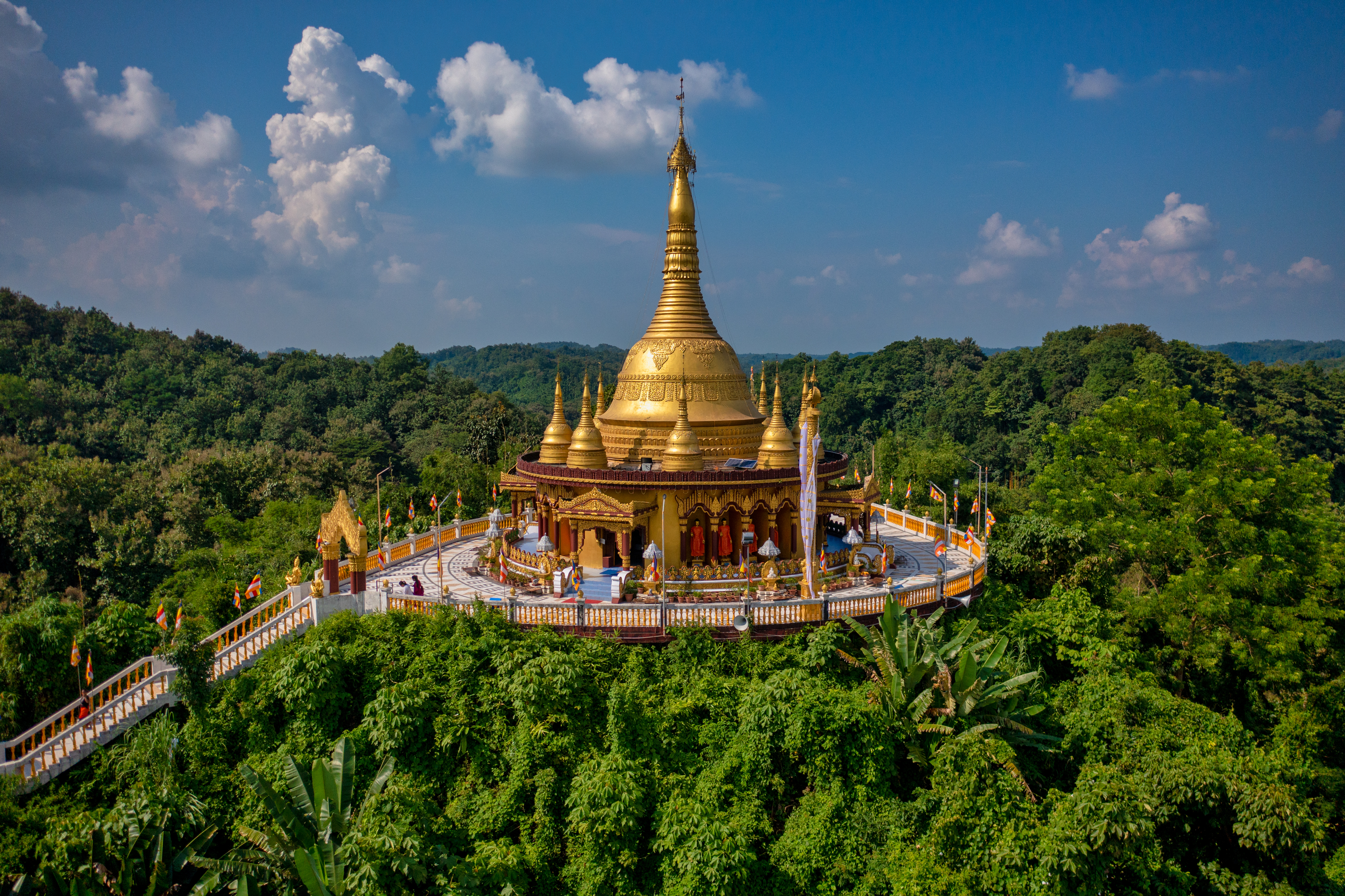
Buddha Dhatu Jadi, Bandarban

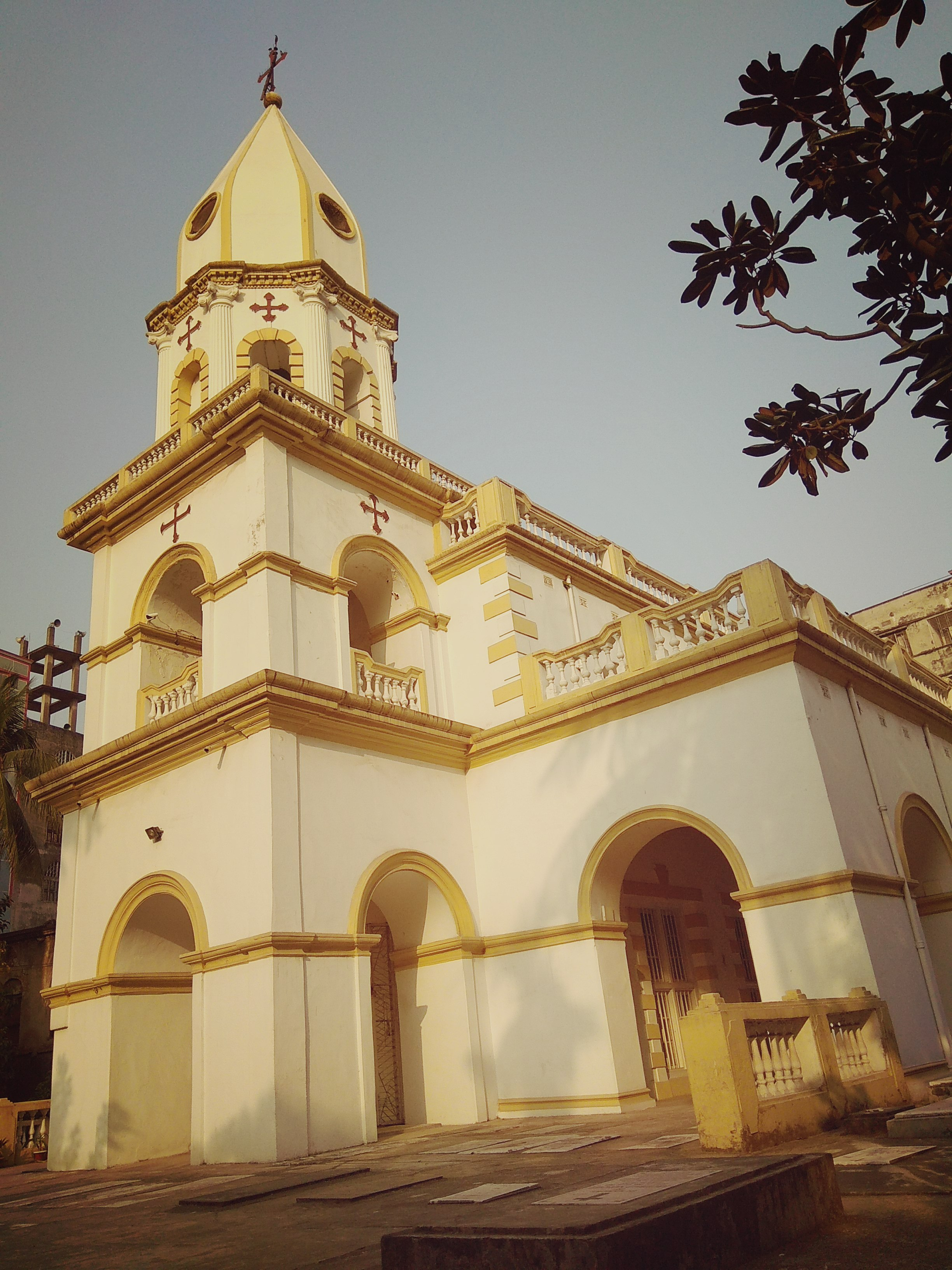
Armenian Church, Dhaka

Sunni Islam is the largest religion in Bangladesh and in all of its districts, except Rangamati which is majority Buddhist. Hinduism, Buddhism and Christianity are the other major religions in the country. Other religions and denominations have small populations, such as Shia Islam, Ahmadiyya, Sikhism, Bahai Faith, Jainism, Judaism, Zoroastrianism (Parsis), Ravidassia (Ad-Dharmi), as well as animism and folk religions.

The United Nations categorizes Bangladesh as a moderate democratic Muslim country. The Constitution of Bangladesh refers to Islam twice: the document begins with the Islamic phrase Bismillahir Rahmanir Raheem (Arabic: بِسْمِ اللهِ الرَّحْمٰنِ الرَّحِيْمِ, lit. 'In the name of God, the Beneficent, the Merciful') and article (2A), added later, declares that: "Islam is the state religion of the republic". However, secularism is also one of the four fundamental principles of the Constitution of Bangladesh since 2011, and the country is mostly governed by secular laws dating from the British colonization. The Constitution guarantees freedom of religion and declares that "the State shall ensure equal status and equal right in the practice of the Hindu, Buddhist, Christian and other faiths and religions". In 2022, Freedom House rated Bangladesh's religious freedom as 2 out of 4.

== Demographic history ==
=== Demographic landscape of Bangladesh before partition ===
Religions in Bangladesh (1941, before partition)
Religion	Percent
Islam	70.3%
Hinduism	28%
Others	1.7%

East Bengal (present-day-Bangladesh) had a population of 39.12 million by the year (1941), of which 27.5 million people were followers of Islamic religion representing about (70.3%) of the region's population, while 10.95 million belongs to the Hindu faith constituting (28%) of the region. Smaller number of 6.65 lakhs people follows Buddhism, Animism and Christianity together presenting around (1.7%) of the region.

=== Demographic landscape of Bangladesh after Independence from Pakistan (1971) ===
Religions in Bangladesh (1971 after independence)
Religion	Percent
Islam	85.4%
Hinduism	13.5%
Others	1.2%

After 1971, East Pakistan became the sovereign nation of the People's Republic of Bangladesh. During that time the population of Bangladesh was found to be 68.7 million, of which 85.4%, or around 58.7 million people, belonged to the Islamic Faith. Hindus were the second largest religious community with a population of 9.28 million, comprising 13.5% of the country's population, and an additional 1.1% practiced other religions such as Buddhism or Christianity.

=== Immigration & refugee crisis ===
Before the Partition of Bengal, it was found that the Muslim population of West Bengal stood at 26% and the Hindu population of East Bengal stood at 28% respectively. Soon after partition, Muslim population in West Bengal have reduced from 26% in 1941 to 19% in 1951, while Hindu population in East Bengal have reduced from 28% in 1941 to 22% in 1951.

During 1971 Bangladesh liberation war

It is estimated that during the time of Bangladesh liberation war, an estimated population of around 10 million people most being 80% Hindus fled from East Pakistan to neighbouring India as refugees following the torture of Pakistani army, and after independence nearly an estimated population of 1.5 - 2 million Hindus stayed back in India and never went back.

=== Religion in Censuses ===
Religion per 2022 census
Religion	Population	Percentage
Islam	150,360,405	91.0%
Hinduism	13,130,109	7.95%
Buddhism	1,007,468	0.61%
Christianity	495,475	0.30%
Others	198,190	0.12%
Total	165,158,616	100%

Religion in Bangladesh (1901-2022)
	Islam	Hinduism	Buddhism	Christianity	Others
1901	66.1%	33.0%	added to others	added to others	0.9%
1911	67.2%	31.5%	added to others	added to others	1.3%
1921	68.1%	30.6%	added to others	added to others	1.3%
1931	69.5%	29.4%	added to others	0.2%	1.0%
1941	70.3%	28.0%	added to others	0.1%	1.6%
Partition of British India
1951	76.9%	22.0%	0.7%	0.3%	0.1%
1961	80.4%	18.5%	0.7%	0.3%	0.1%
Independence from Pakistan
1974	85.4%	13.5%	0.6%	0.2%	0.2%
1981	86.6%	12.1%	0.6%	0.3%	0.3%
1991	88.3%	10.5%	0.6%	0.3%	0.3%
2001	89.6%	9.3%	0.6%	0.3%	0.1%
2011	90.4%	8.5%	0.6%	0.3%	0.1%
2022	91.0%	8.0%	0.6%	0.3%	0.1%

== Religions ==
=== Islam ===
Map of percentage of Bangladeshi Muslims by Upazila or Sub-district (2011)

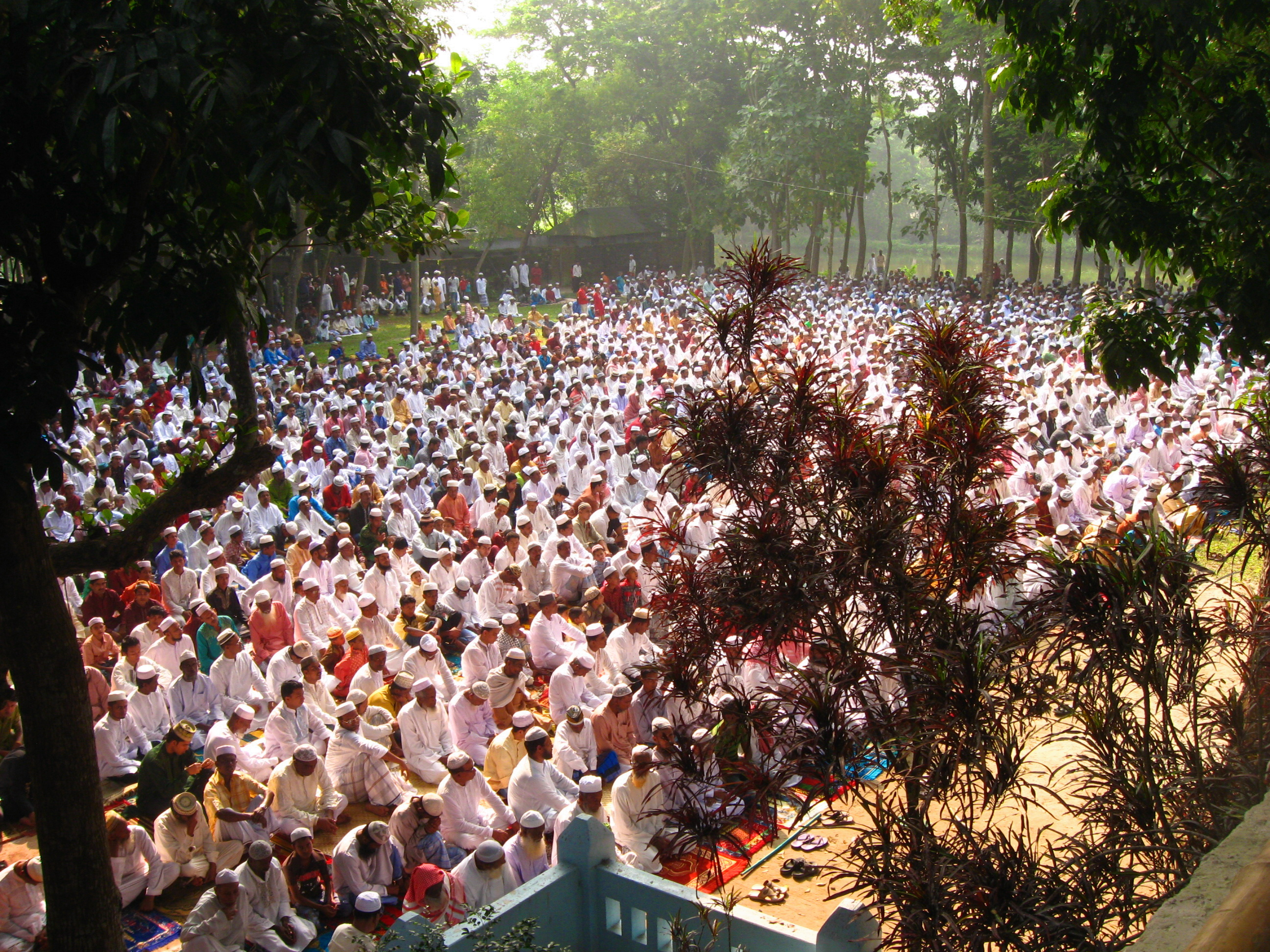
Males from around the Barashalghar union of Comilla's Debidwar upazila can be seen attending Khutbah as part of the Eid-ul-Fitr prayers

The Muslim population in Bangladesh was over 150.36 million according to the 2022 census which makes Muslims, 91.04% of the population in the country. Estimation shows that over 1 million Rohingya Muslim refugees live in Bangladesh who have come here during the period of (2016–17) massacre in Myanmar. On 28 September 2018, at the 73rd United Nations General Assembly, Bangladeshi Prime Minister Sheikh Hasina said there are 1.1-1.3 million Rohingya refugees in Bangladesh.

The Constitution of Bangladesh declares Islam as the state religion. Bangladesh is the fourth-largest Muslim-populated country. Muslims are the predominant community of the country and they form the majority of the population in all eight divisions of Bangladesh. The overwhelming majority of Bangladeshi Muslims are Bengali Muslims at 98 percent, but a small segment about 2 percent of them are Bihari Muslims and Rohingyas. Almost all Muslims in Bangladesh are Sunnis, but there is a small Shia community. There are 2 million Shias in Bangladesh. Although these Shias are few in number, in Dhaka on Ashura they bring out mourning processions commemorating the death of the Islamic prophet Muhammad's grandson Husain ibn Ali. Muslims celebrate Eid ul-Fitr, Eid ul-Adha, Muharram, Mawlid, Shab-e-Barat and Chand Raat all across the country with much fanfare and grandeur. The annual Bishwa Ijtema is the largest and most notable congregation of Muslims in Bangladesh. Bangladesh also has a minority of Ahmadiyya Muslims. As of 2004, there are approximately 100,000 Ahmadis in the country.

The Muslim community in the Bengal region i.e., Bangladesh and West Bengal (India), developed independently of the dominant Islamic rules in India. Features of Bangladeshi Hinduism, which similar to other parts of South Asia (Indian subcontinent), influenced both the practices and the social structure of the Bangladeshi Muslim community. In spite of the general personal commitment to Islam by the Muslims of Bangladesh, observance of Islamic rituals and tenets varies according to social position, locale, and personal considerations. In rural regions, some beliefs and practices tend to incorporate elements that differ from and often conflict with orthodox Islam.

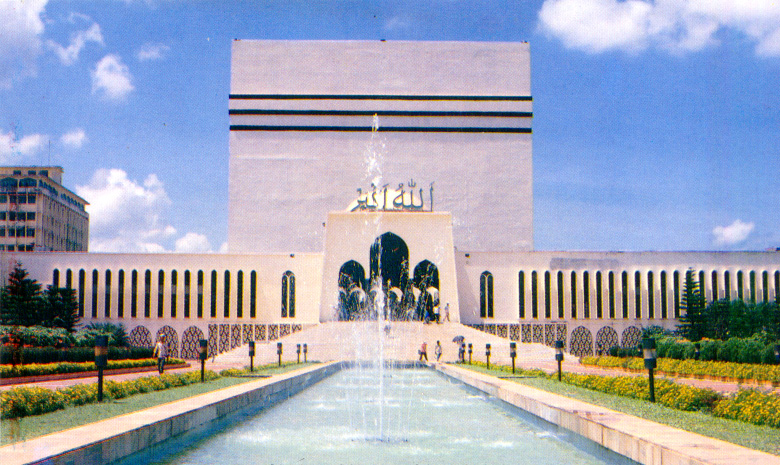
Baitul Mukarram National Mosque, the largest and national mosque

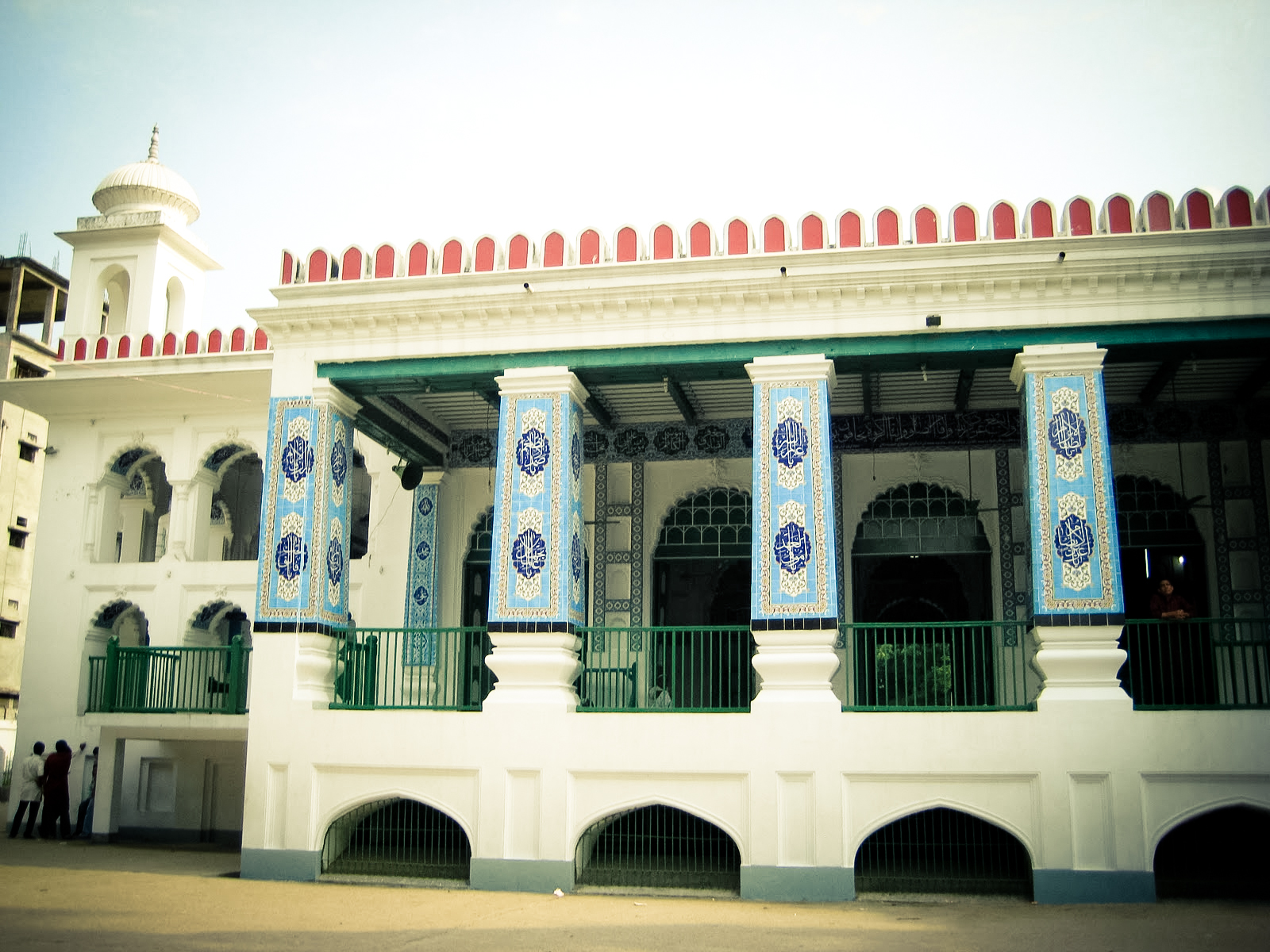
Hussaini Dalan, the largest Imambara for the Shia Muslims in Bangladesh

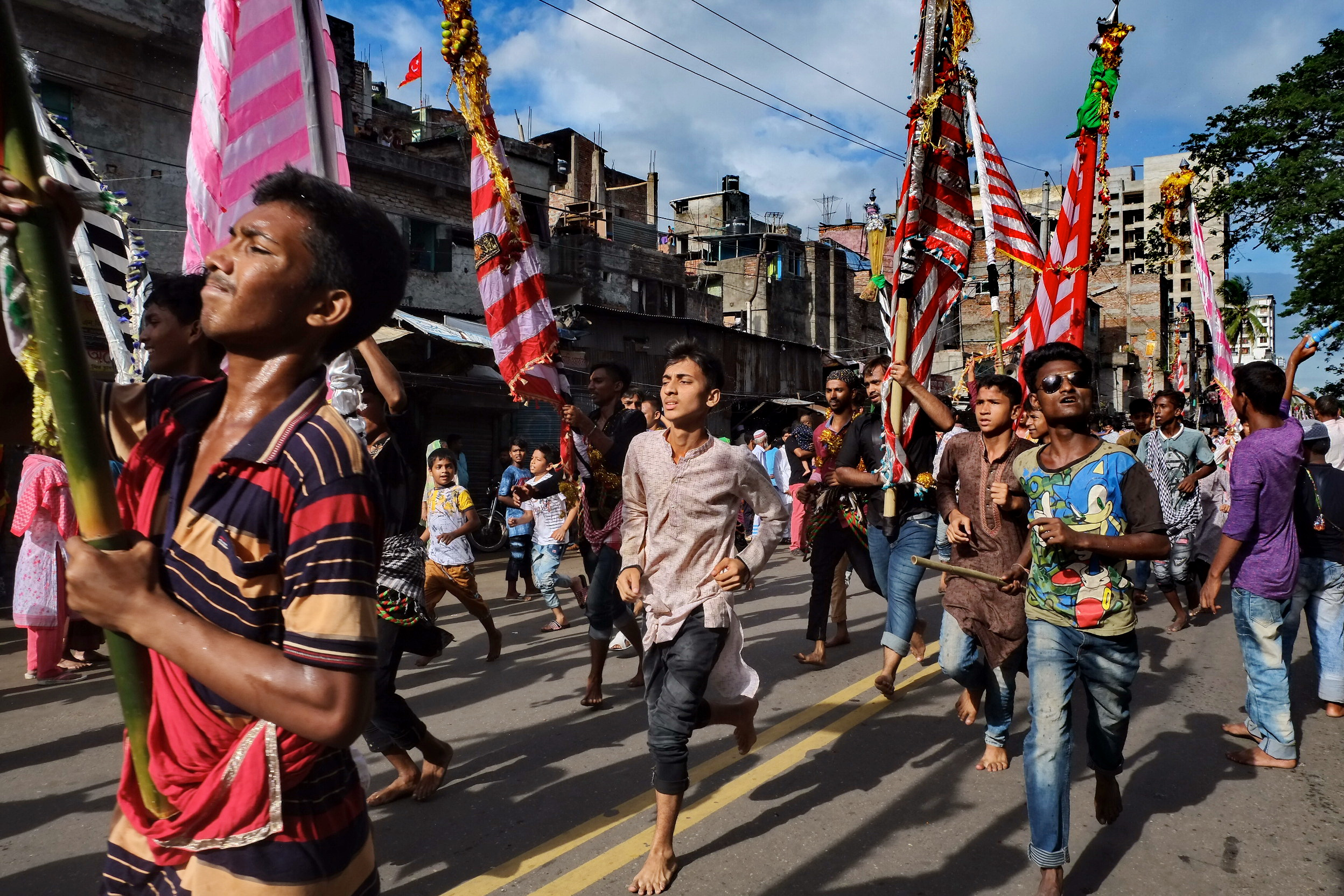
Shias celebrating Ashura at Geneva Camp, Mohammadpur, Dhaka

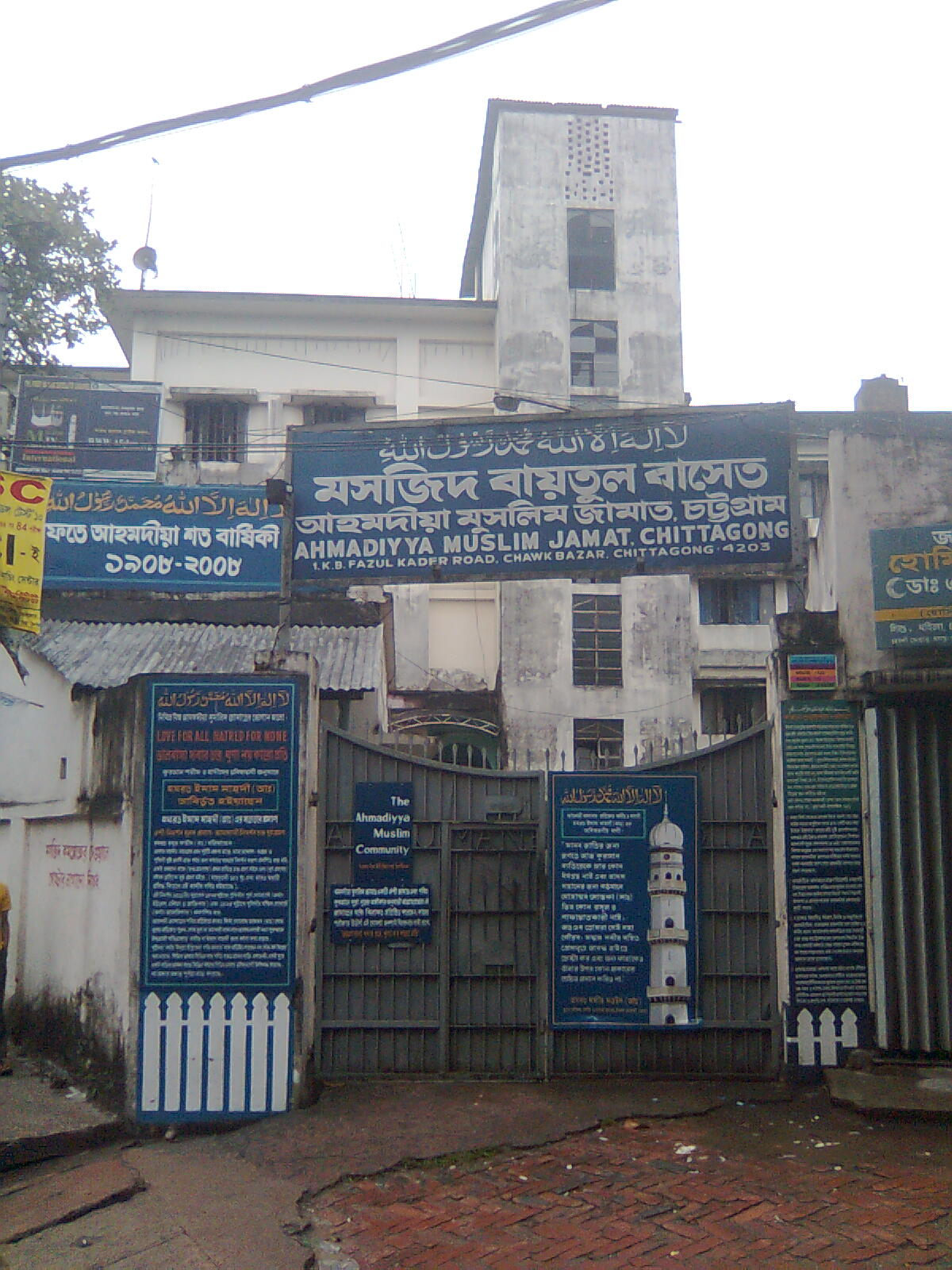
An Ahmadiyya mosque in Chittagong

=== Hinduism ===
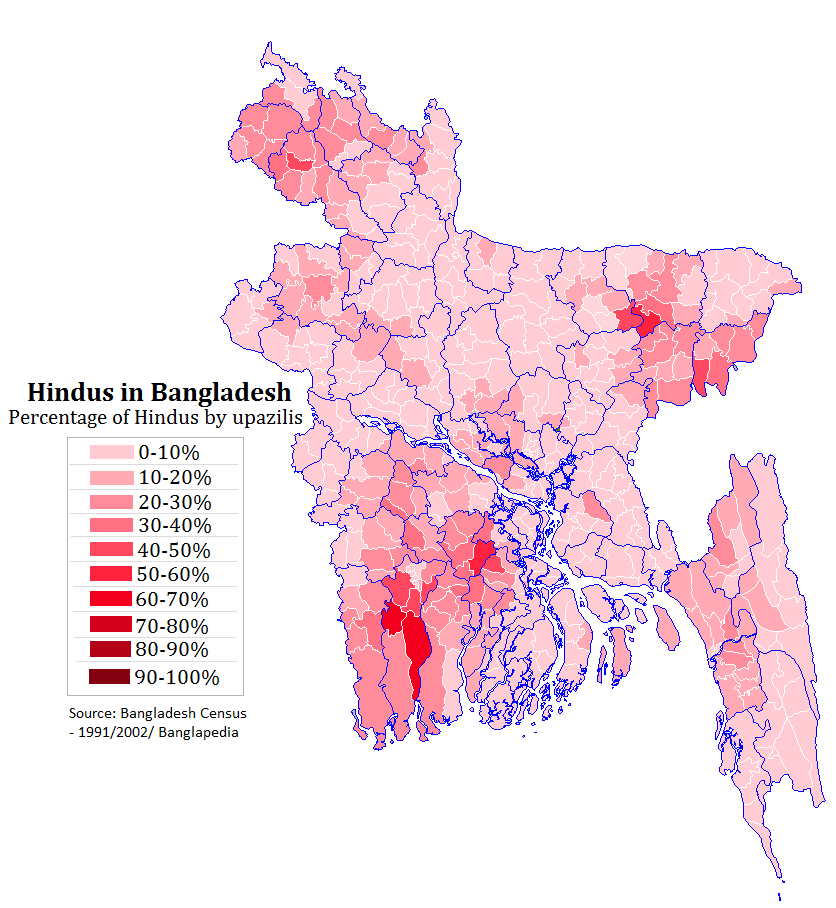
Map of percentage of Bangladeshi Hindus by Upazila or Sub-district (2011)

Hinduism is the second largest religious affiliation in Bangladesh, with around 13.1 million people identifying themselves as Hindus out of 165.16 million people and making up about 7.95 per cent of the total population as second largest minority according to the recent 2022 census. In terms of population, Bangladesh is the third largest Hindu populated country of the world, just after India and Nepal.

Bangladeshi Hindus are predominantly Bengali Hindus, but a distinct Hindu population also exists among the indigenous tribes like Garo, Khasi, Jaintia, Santhal, Bishnupriya Manipuri, Tripuri, Munda, Oraon, Dhanuk etc. Hindus are evenly distributed throughout all regions of Bangladesh, with significant concentrations in northern, southwestern and northeastern parts of the country. In nature, Bangladeshi Hinduism closely resembles the rituals and customs of Hinduism practised in the neighbouring Indian state of West Bengal with which Bangladesh (at one time known as East Bengal) was united until the partition of India in 1947. Hindu festivals of Durga Puja, Rath Yatra, Dol Yatra (Holi), Janmashtami, Deepabali, Sankranti, Kali Puja, Lakshmi Puja, Saraswati Puja etc. witness jubilant celebrations across various cities, towns and villages of Bangladesh.

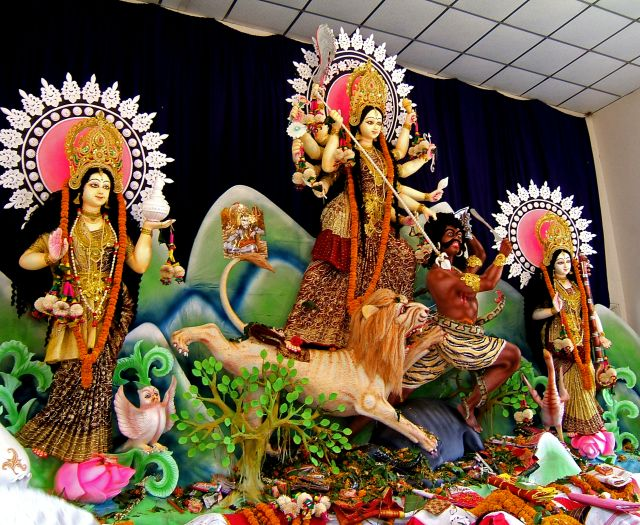
Durga Puja celebrations in Dhakeshwari Temple, Dhaka

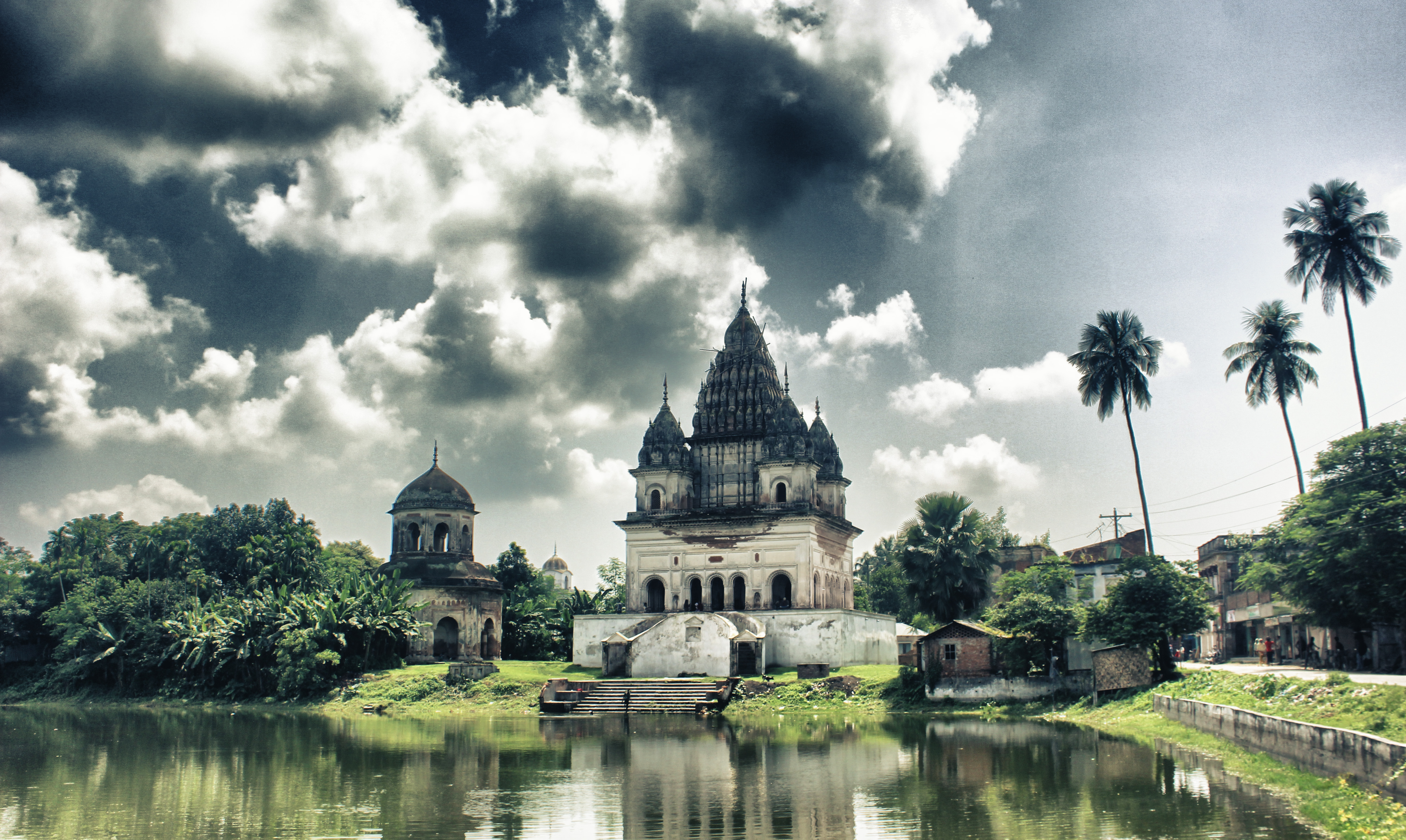
Shiva Temple in Puthia, Rajshahi

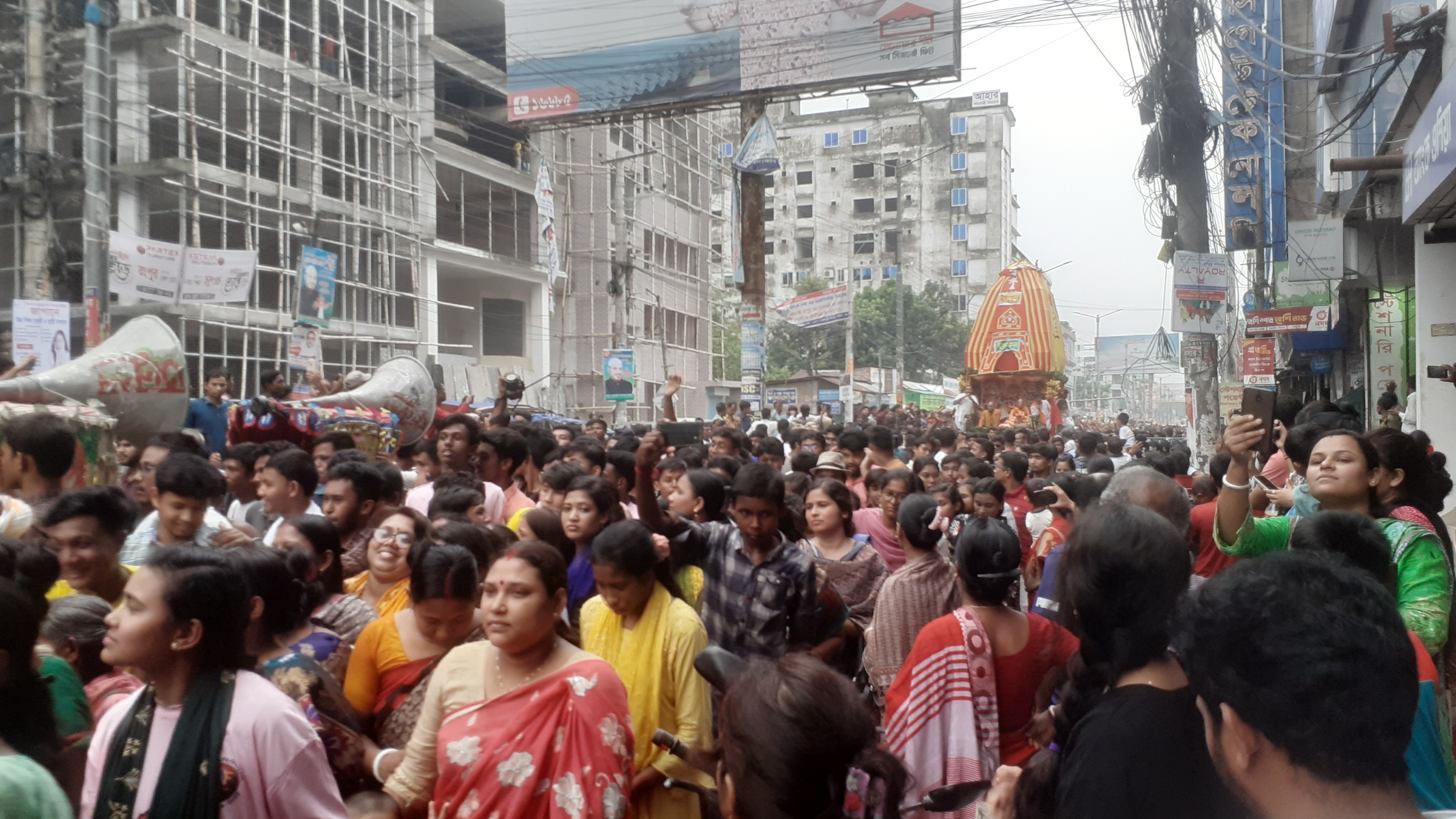
Ratha Yatra, one of the Hindu festivals

=== Buddhism ===
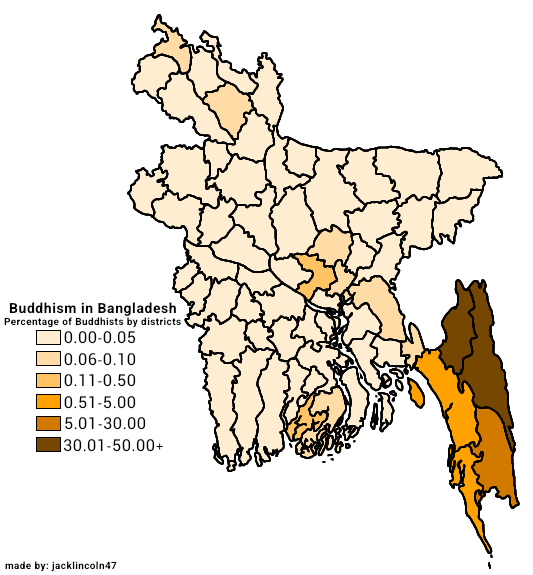
Map of percentage of Bangladeshi Buddhists by District.

About 1 million people in Bangladesh adhere to the Theravada school of Buddhism. Buddhists form about 0.61 per cent of the population of Bangladesh as per 2022 census. Buddhism is the third largest religion in Bangladesh.

In antiquity, the region of present-day Bangladesh was a center of Buddhism in Asia. Buddhist civilisation, including philosophies and architecture, traveled to Tibet, Southeast Asia and Indonesia from Bengal. The Buddhist architecture of Cambodia, Indonesia and Thailand, including the Angkor Wat Temple and the Borobudur vihara, are believed to have been inspired by the ancient monasteries of Bangladesh such as the Somapura Mahavihara.

Most of the followers of Buddhism in Bangladesh live in the Chittagong division. Here, Buddhism is practised by the Bengali-speaking Baruas, who are almost exclusively Buddhist and are concentrated heavily in the Chittagong area as well as few of the Barua Buddhists live in other parts of Bangladesh, such as Comilla, Mymensingh, Rangpur, Sylhet districts. Most of the followers of Buddhism in Bangladesh live in southeastern region, especially in the Chittagong Hill Tracts, Chittagong and Comilla district. Most of the Buddhists of Chittagong Hill Tracts belong to the Chakma, Marma, Mru, Khumi, Chak, Murang, Tanchangya and Khiang tribes, who since time immemorial have practised Buddhism. Other tribal communities who practise animism, have come under some Buddhist influence. The beliefs and rituals of the Buddhist communities in this region are amalgamations of Buddhism and ancient animistic faiths. Buddha Purnima is the most widely observed festival among both Bengali Buddhists and Buddhist tribes.

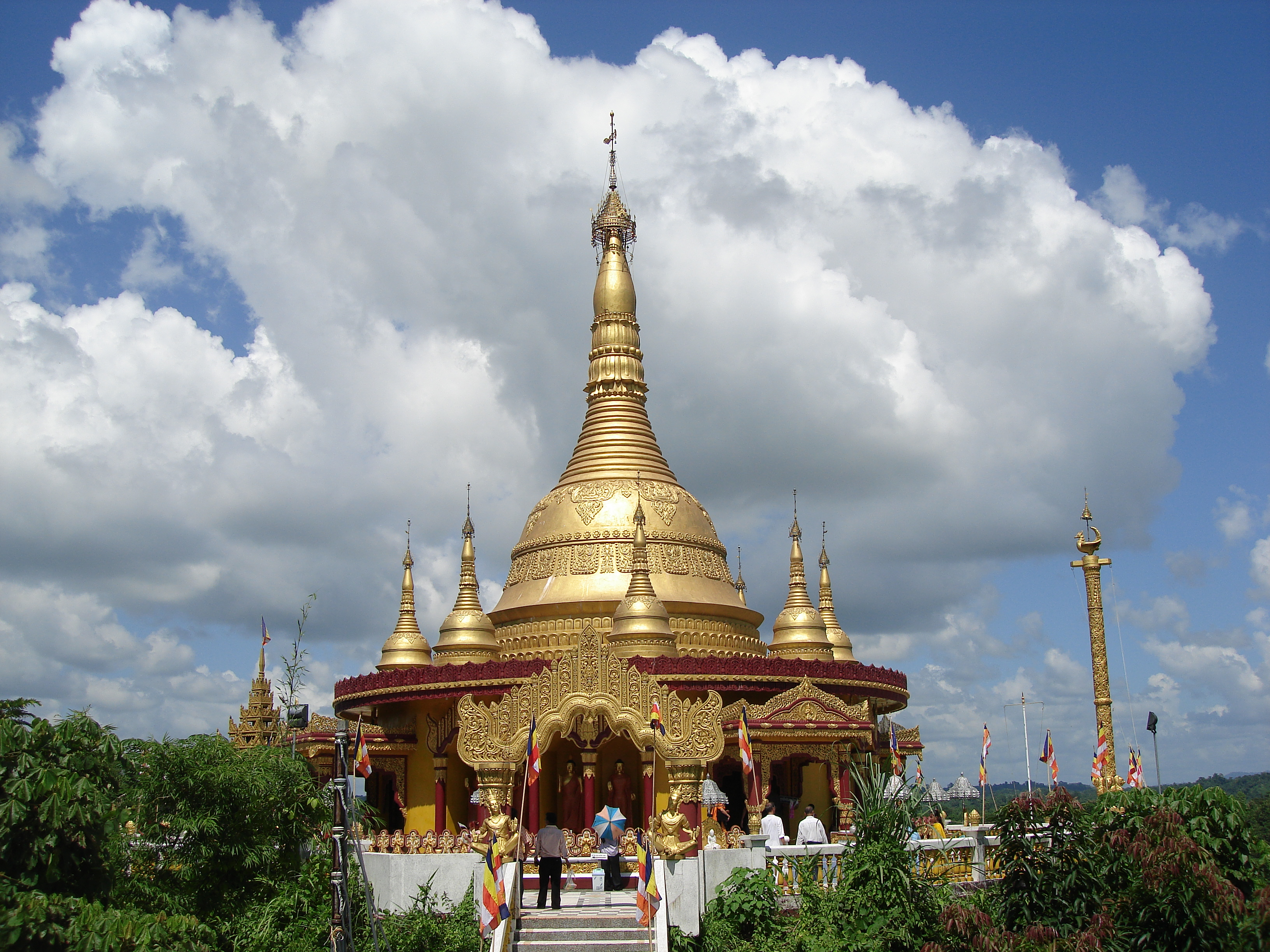
Buddha Dhatu Jadi, one of the largest Theravada Buddhist temples in Bandarban, has the second-largest Buddha statue in the country

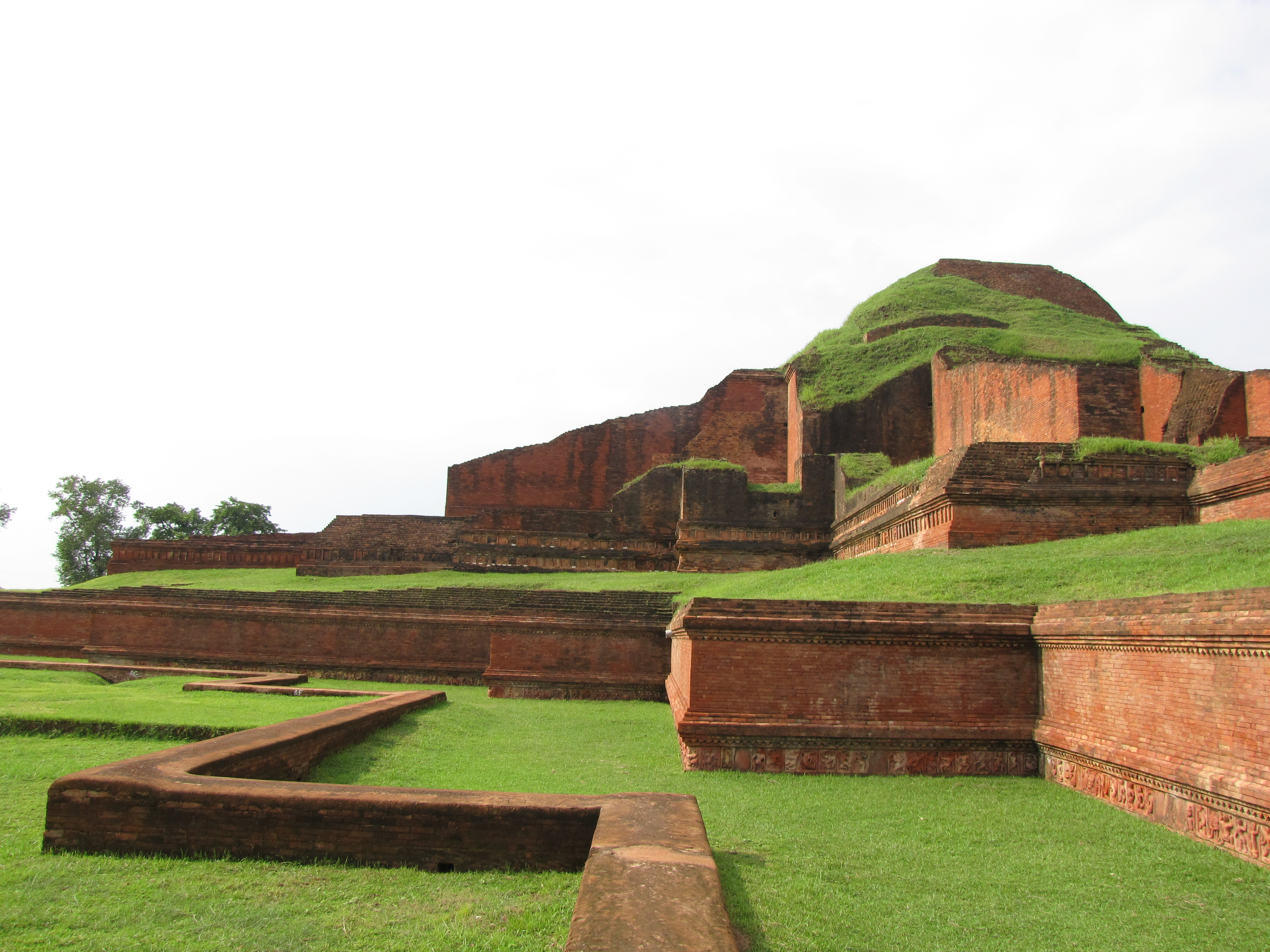
Somapura Mahavihara is a World Heritage Site at Naogaon

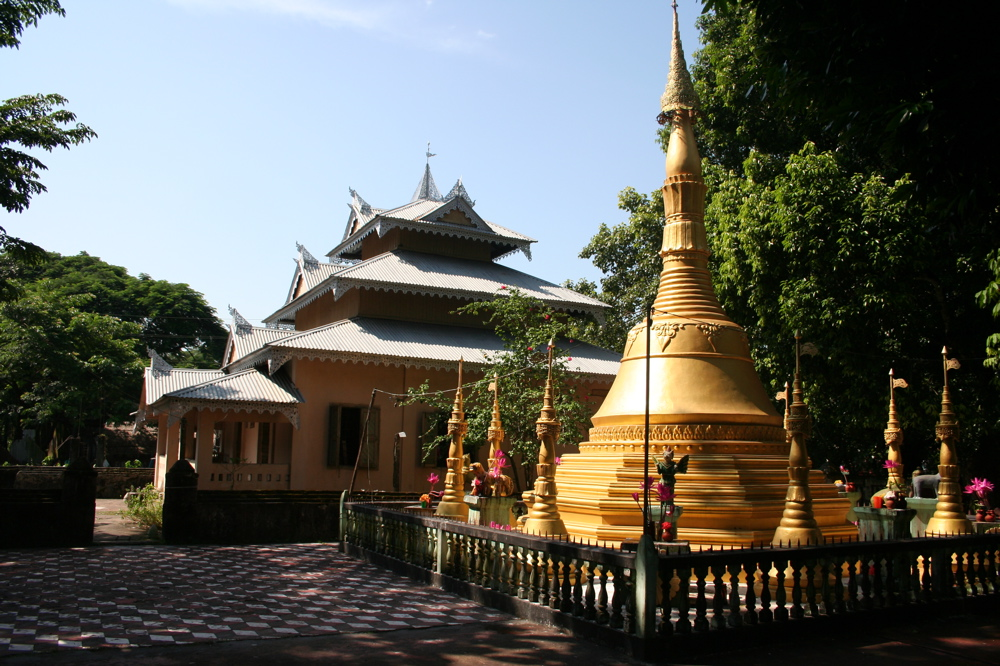
A Buddhist temple in Moheshkhali, Cox's Bazar

=== Christianity ===
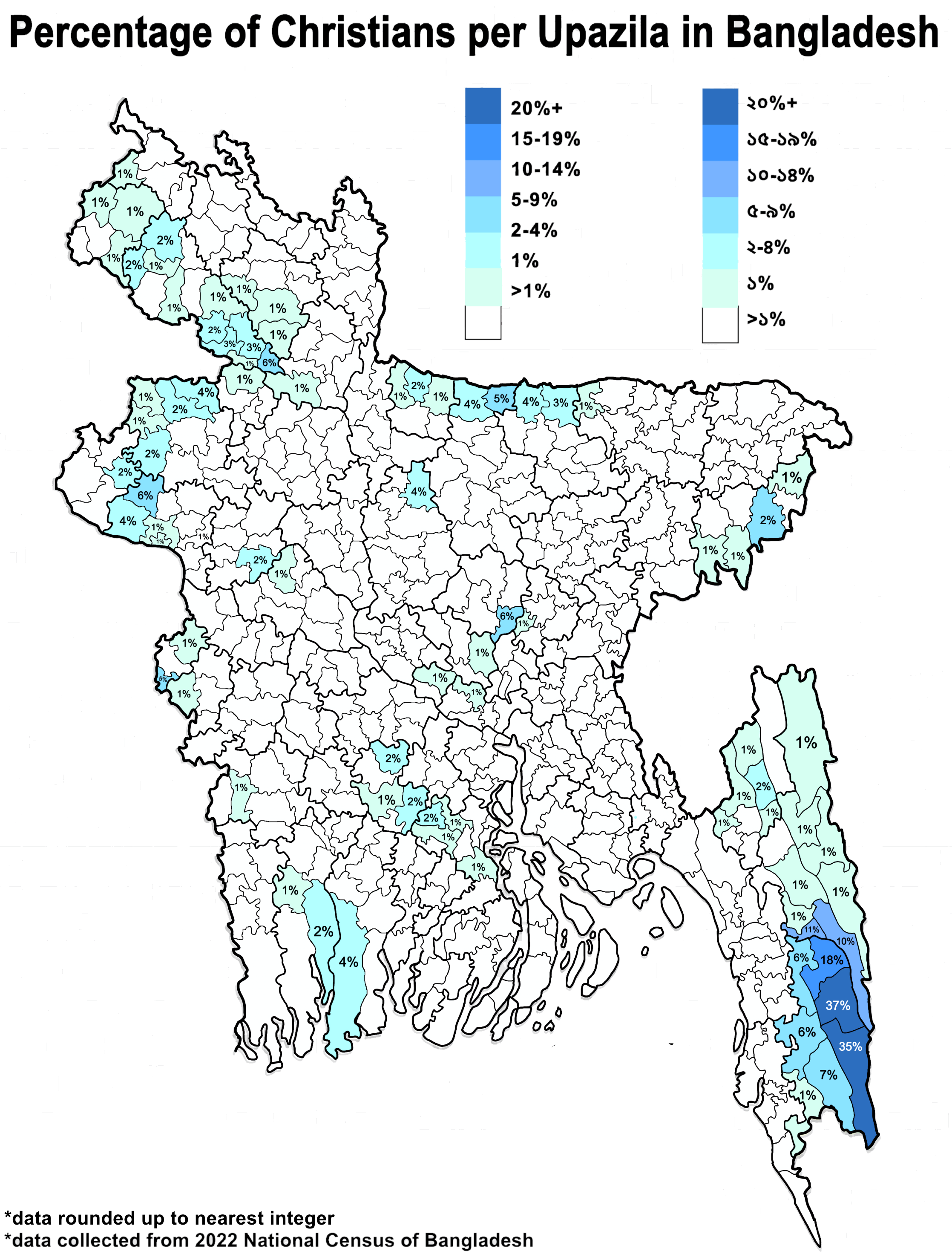
Map of Christians, per Upazila in Bangladesh

Christianity is the fourth largest religion in Bangladesh. Catholicism arrived in what is now Bangladesh during the late sixteenth to early seventeenth centuries AD, through the Portuguese traders and missionaries. Baptists come to the country in 1795. Another large Protestant denomination is the Church of Bangladesh, an united body of Anglicans and Presbyterians. Among other Christians branches are Lutherans, Seventh-day Adventists, Pentecostals, Jehovah's Witnesses, and Latter-day Saints. Bangladesh is home to the "Messianic Mosques" movement—similar to Messianics in the West—combinated Christian faith with Muslim culture, its membership is estimated as 100.000.

Christians numbering around half a million account for approximately 0.3 per cent of the total population and they are mostly an urban community. Roman Catholicism is predominant among the Bengali Christians, while the remaining are mostly Protestants. Few followers of Christianity are also present among certain indigenous tribal communities such as Garo, Santal, Oraon, Khasi, Lushei, Bawm, etc.

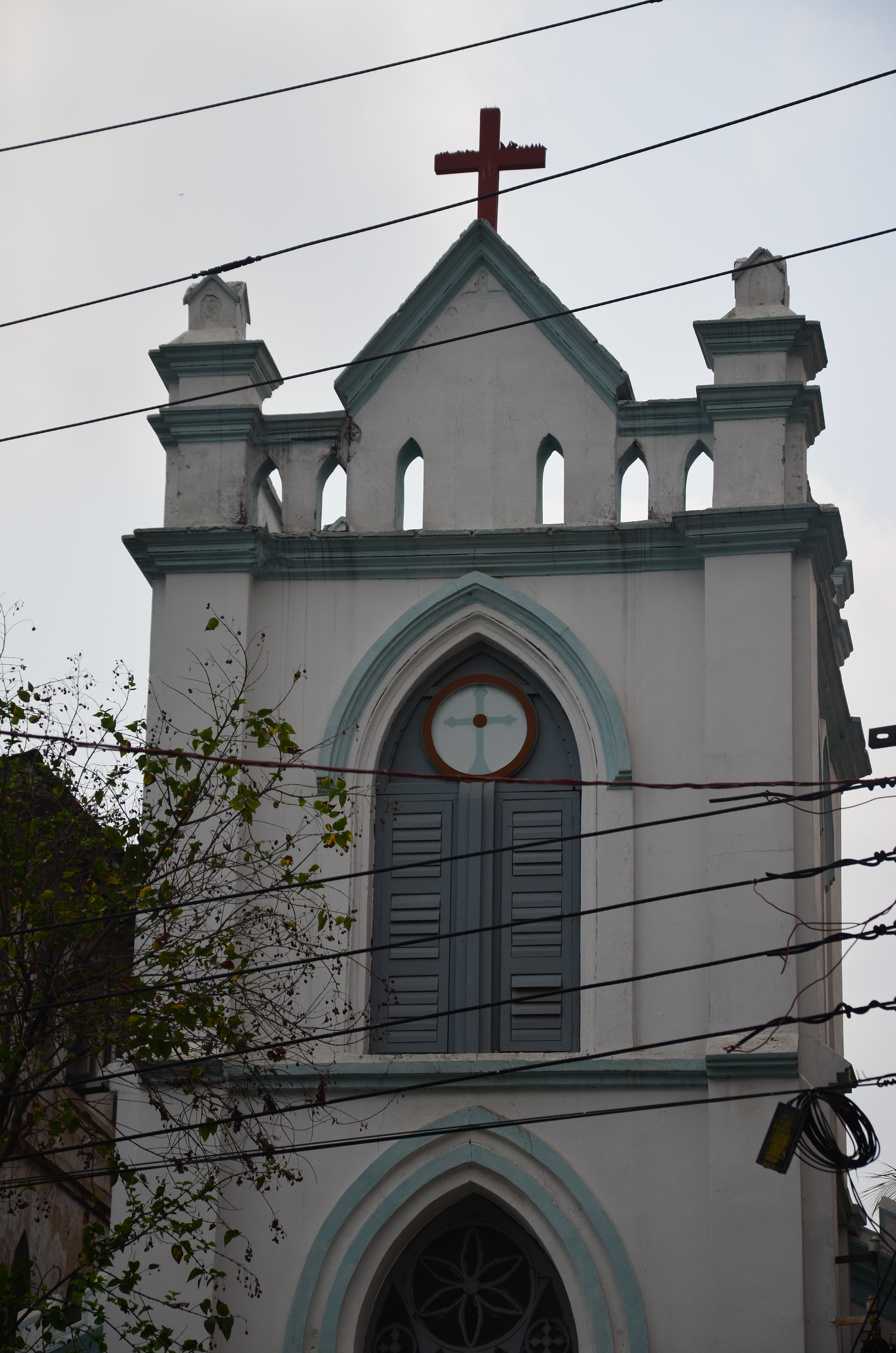
Holy Cross Church, Dhaka

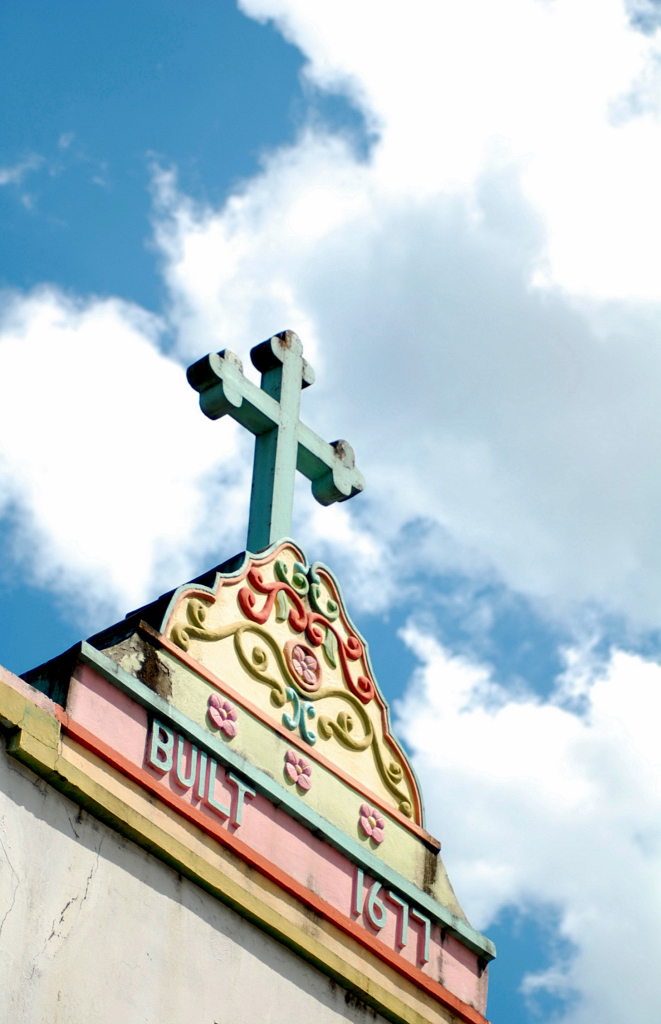
Holy Rosary's Church (est. 1677) in Dhaka

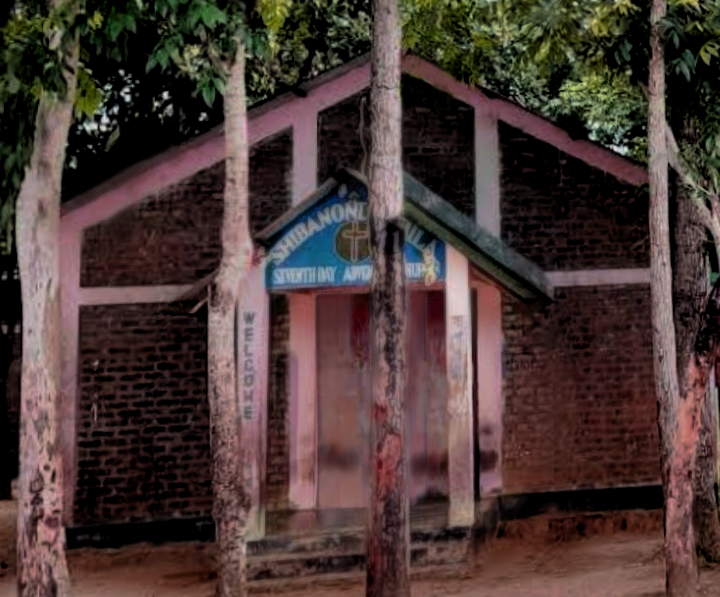
A Seventh-day Adventist Church in Dhobaura, Mymensingh

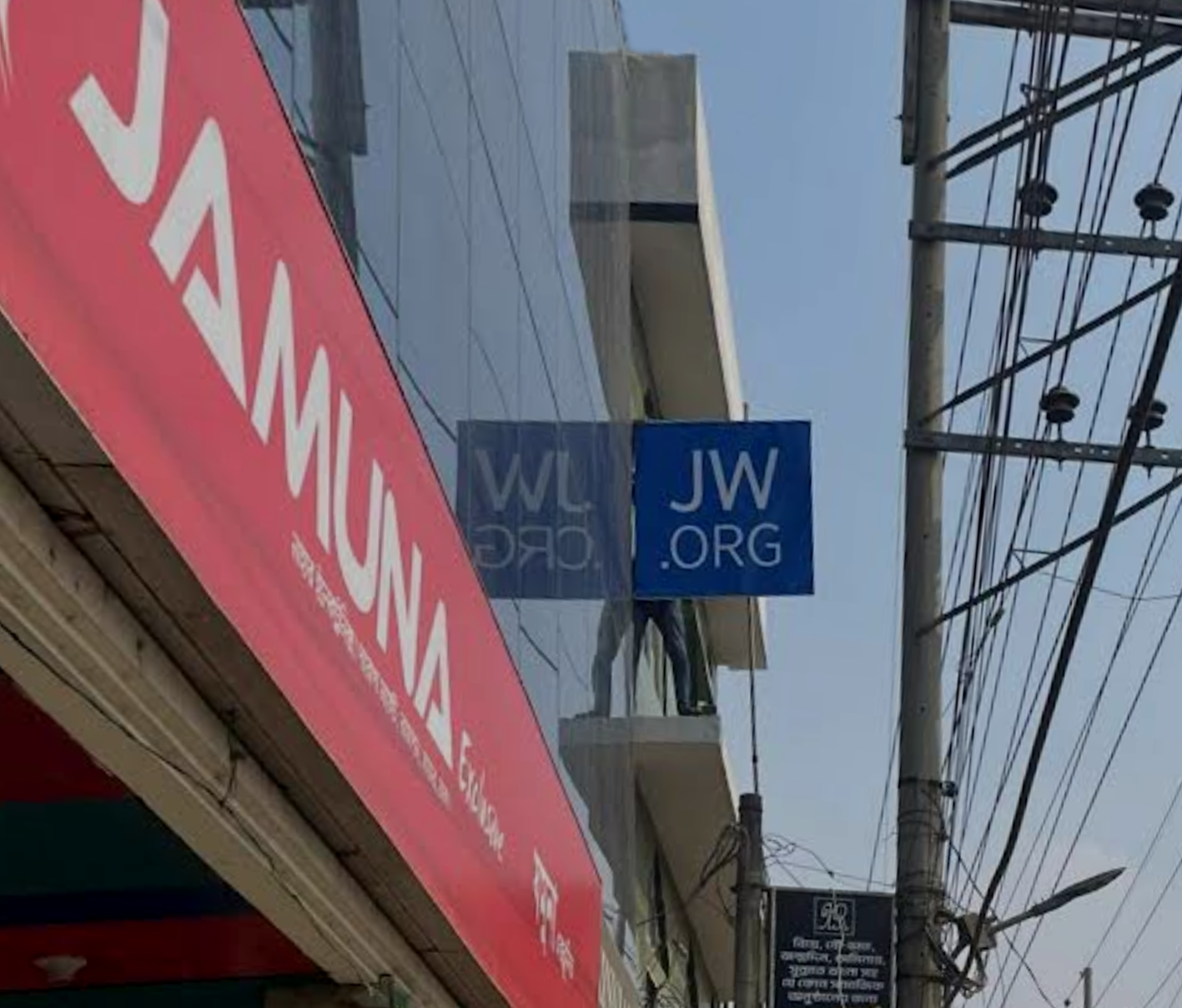
Jehovah's Witnesses logo spotted near the Kingdom Hall in Dhaka

=== Bahá'í Faith ===
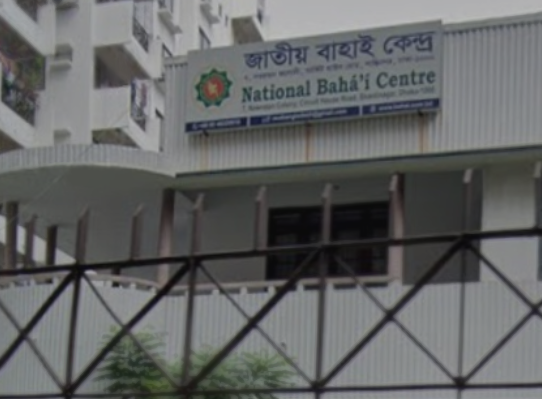
National Bahá'í Centre, Dhaka, Bangladesh

Bangladesh has a small community of the Baháʼí Faith. Baháʼís have spiritual centres in Dhaka, Chittagong, Khulna, Rajshahi, Sylhet, Barisal, Rangpur, Mymensingh, Jessore, Rangamati and other places. There is a National Bahá'í Centre in Dhaka.

The origins of the Baháʼí Faith in Bangladesh begin previous to its independence, when it was part of the British Raj. The roots of the Baháʼí Faith in the region go back to the first days of the Bábí religion in 1844.

According to The Business Standard the population is about 300,000.

=== Sikhism ===
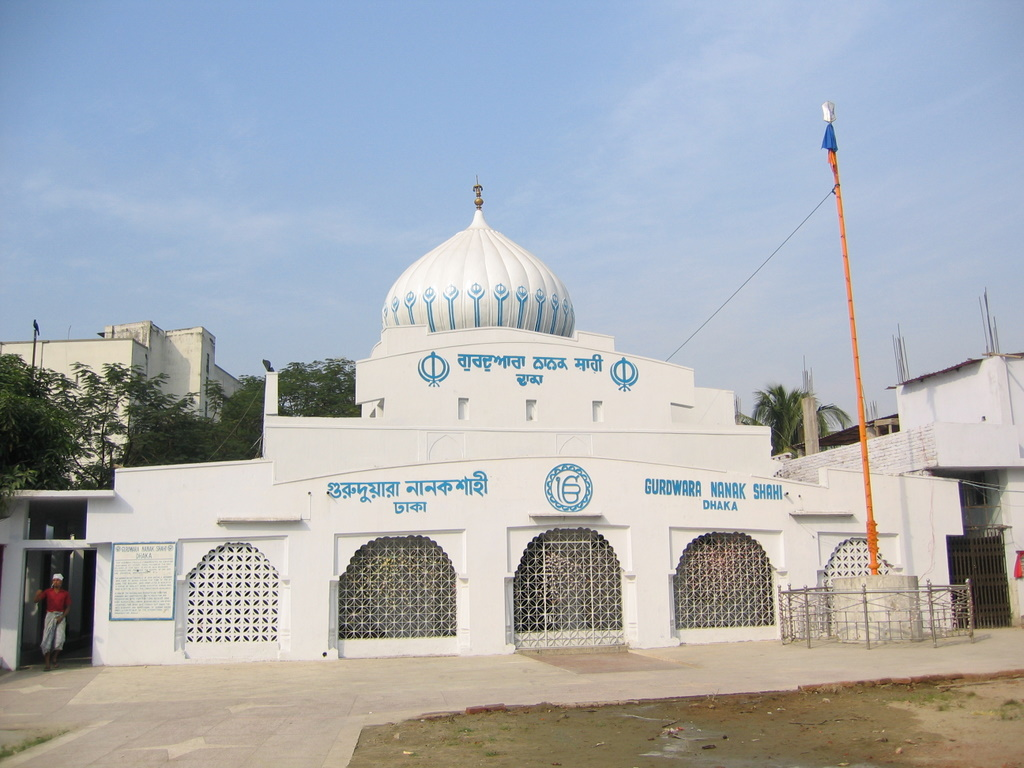
Gurdwara Nanak Shahi at Dhaka, one of the oldest and largest Gurudwara of Bangladesh

The presence of this religion goes back to the visitation of Guru Nanak in 1506–07 with some of his followers to spread Sikhism in the region of the present-day Bangladesh. When some Bengali people accepted this faith, a Sikh community was born. This community became bigger when almost 10,000 Sikhs came from India during the Bangladesh Liberation War. This community has made great progress in the country. Today there are almost 10 gurdwaras in Bangladesh. Among them only 7 are well-known, especially the Gurdwara Nanak Shahi beside the University of Dhaka in Dhaka, which was built in 1830, the oldest gurdwara in Bangladesh. There are currently 23,000 Sikhs in Bangladesh.

=== Judaism ===
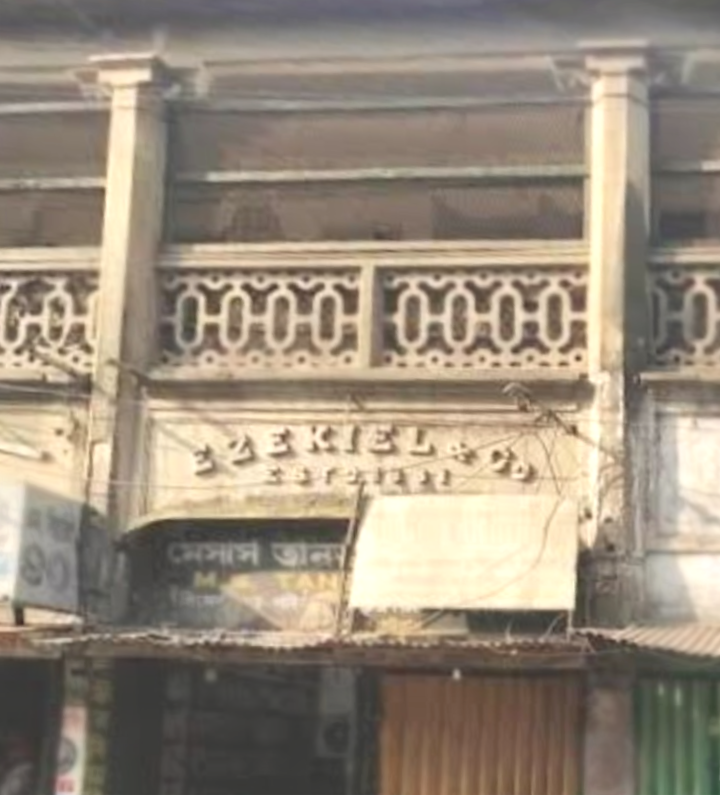
140-year-old Jewish property in Chittagong, Bangladesh

Since the 18th century there have been Jews in what today is Bangladesh, but their number was always very small, often only some few individuals. The Jewish population in East Bengal was only about 135 Jews at the time of the Partition of British India in 1947.

By the late 1960s, much of the Jewish community had left for Calcutta. According to historian Ziauddin Tariq Ali, a trustee of the Liberation War Museum, "There were two Jewish families in Bangladesh [after independence], but both migrated to India — one in 1973 and the other in 1975." In 2018 there were 4 Jews in Dhaka. Some sources also claim that there are 175 Jews in Bangladesh, and 3,500 with Bangladeshi ancestry. Bangladesh also has a small community of the Jewish Bnei Menashe Kuki-Chin-Mizo community, they mostly live in Bandarban district.

=== Jainism ===
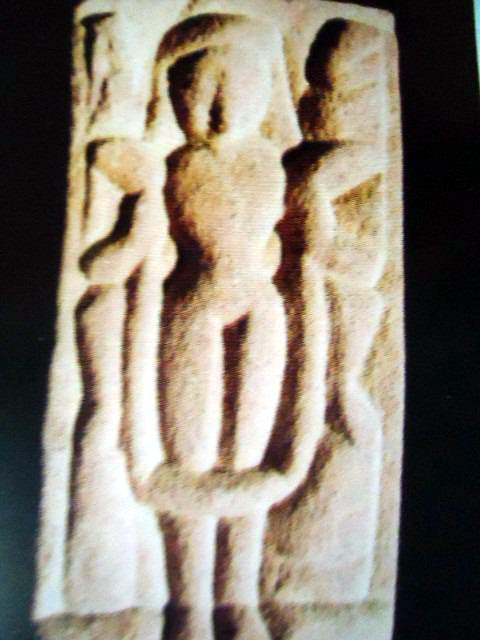
Clay pots with snake-like designs have been found in Bangladesh, which bear evidence of the worship of the Panchanag or Saptanag of Jainism

Jainism likely reached the Bengal region, including what is now Bangladesh, by the 5th century BCE. The religion thrived alongside Buddhism and Hinduism in ancient Bengal, during the Pala dynasties, during 8th to 12th centuries and Sena dynasty from 11th to 12th centuries, Jains enjoyed patronage, leading to the establishment of temples and communities.

They contributed to the cultural and architectural development in the region. Alexander Cunningham first discovered a Jaina image at Mahasthangarh (Mahasthangad) in 1879, which was later on moved to the Varendra Research Museum, in 1912.

In the 19th and early 20th centuries, Jains migrated to urban areas during British colonial rule. After the Partition of India in 1947, many Jains migrated to India due to communal tensions and demographic changes, significantly reducing their population in Bangladesh. There are approximately 1,000 Jains living in Bangladesh now.

=== Other religions ===
==== Animism and folk religions ====
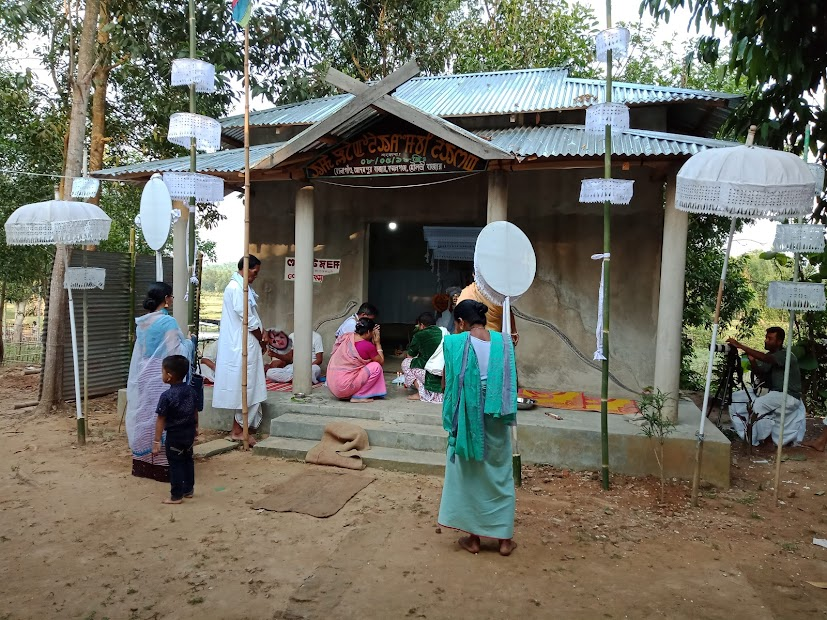
A place of worship of traditional Meitei deities called Umang Lai of Sanamahism in Moulvibazar, Bangladesh.

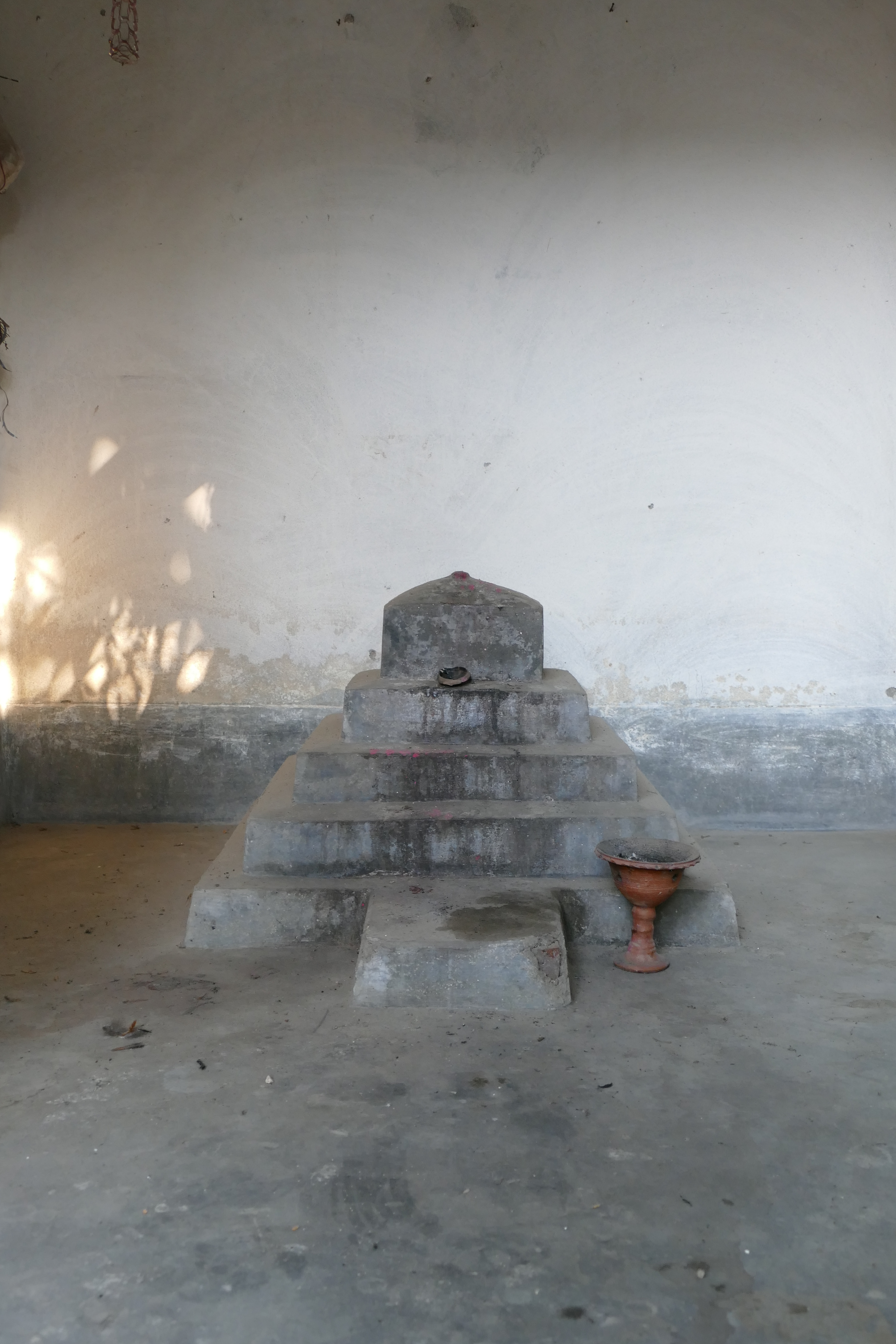
Sarnaist place of worship used by the Santal people in Dinajpur, Bangladesh.

Animism and folk religions exist in Bangladesh's Chittagong Hill Tracts, among non-Bengali indigenous minorities in North Bengal, parts of Sylhet division and the Garo Hills of Mymensingh division. In the Bangladeshi religious census, animistic or tribal religions are sometimes recorded under Hinduism, Buddhism, Christianity or "Others". Animistic religions in Bangladesh include Sanamahism, Sari Dharam, Sarnaism and others. Sanamahism has followers in Bangladesh. It is primarily practiced by Meiteis and some Khasis, who mainly live in the Mymensingh and Sylhet divisions. Bangladesh also has a very small number of Sarnaist or Sari Dharam followers, mostly Mundas or Santalis. They primarily live in Rangpur and Rajshahi divisions. Other animistic, shamanistic or folk religions in Bangladesh include Songsarek, practiced by the Garo; Sakhua, practiced by the Lushai, Pankho, Bawm and Khyang; Krama, practiced by the Mru, Khumi and Chak; Niamtre, practiced by the Jaintia/Pnar; Ka Niam Khasi, practiced by the Khasi; Tripuri folk religion, practiced by the Tripuri; and Kiratism, practiced by some Rai communities in Bangladesh. In Bangladesh, some Chakma, Tanchangya, Marma, Rakhine (Arakanese) and Burmese communities also practice Burmese/Marma/Arakanese folk religion. These traditions are largely influenced by Buddhism and Hinduism, with rituals and beliefs that mix folk practices with Buddhist and Hindu elements.

==== Zoroastrianism ====
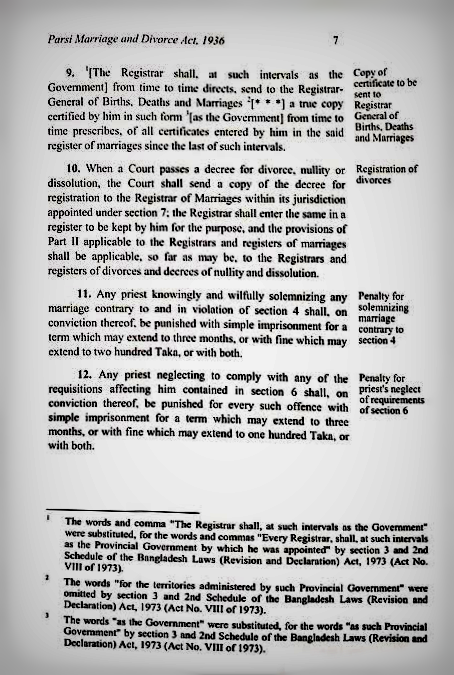
Parsi Marriage and Divorce Act from 1936 (Bangladesh)

Bangladesh has a small community of Zoroastrians (Parsis). The existence of a legally recognized Zoroastrian community in Bangladesh is evidenced by the Parsi Marriage and Divorce Act, 1936, which provided a legal framework for the marriage and divorce of members of the Parsi community in the region.

==== Ravidassia or Ad-Dharmi ====
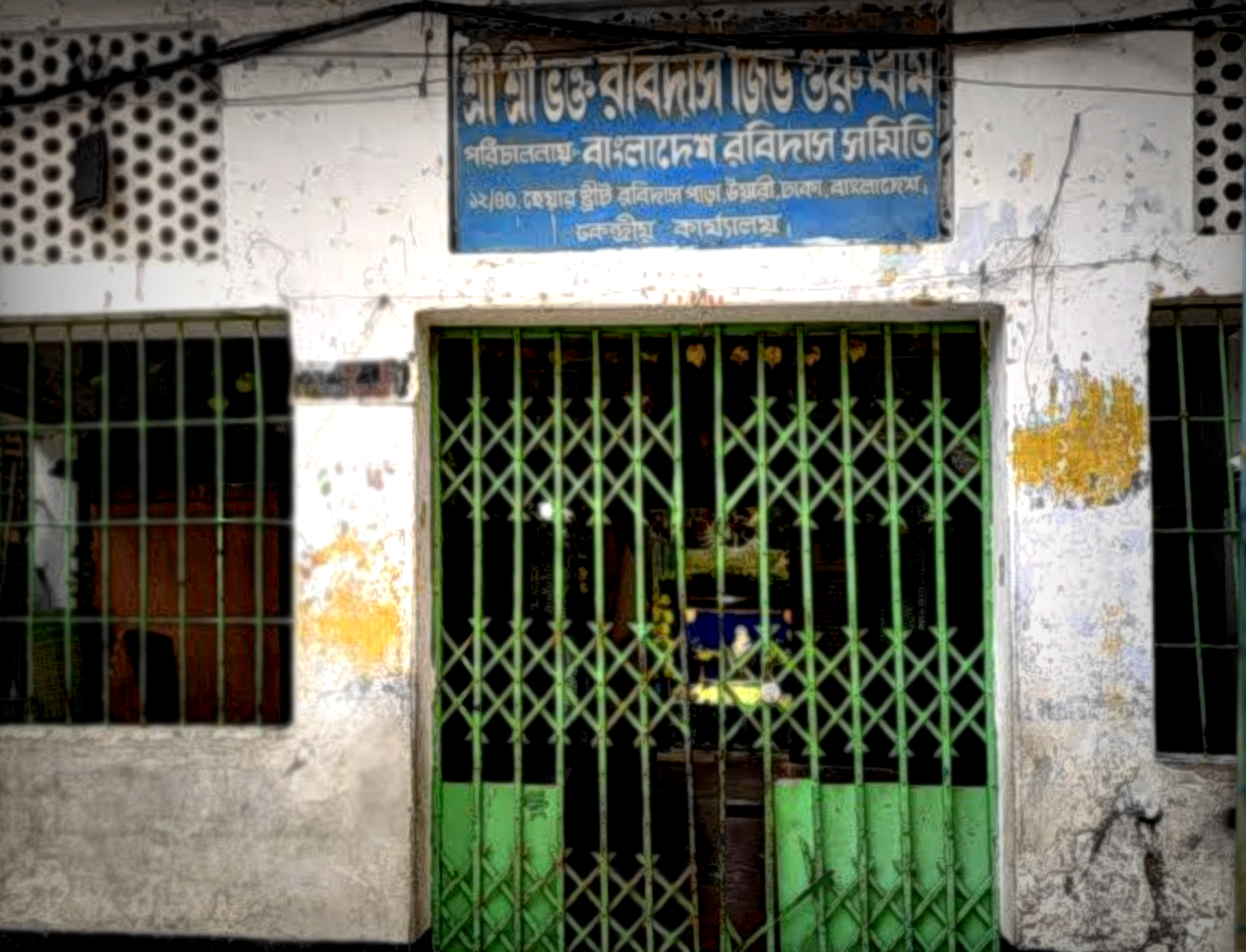
Bangladesh Ravidassia Association, Dhaka

There is a small community of Ravidassia or Ad-Dharmis in Bangladesh.

==== Taoism ====
Taoism is present primarily through the Chinese diaspora and cultural programmes. Taoist rituals and practices appear alongside Chinese festivals such as the Lunar New Year and community events, often combined with Buddhist and Confucianist customs, but it has no large indigenous following.

==== Confucianism ====
Confucianism exists mainly as a cultural and philosophical influence. It is promoted through educational and community programmes within Chinese diaspora circles, focusing on moral and social teachings rather than formal religious practice.

==== Shintoism ====
Shintoism is limited to Japanese expatriates and embassy cultural activities. Rites and seasonal observances occur privately or in official events, with no significant local following.

==== Brahmo Samaj ====
A Brahmo Samaj Hindu temple in Dhaka

Bangladesh also has a tiny Brahmo Samaj community.

== Irreligion ==
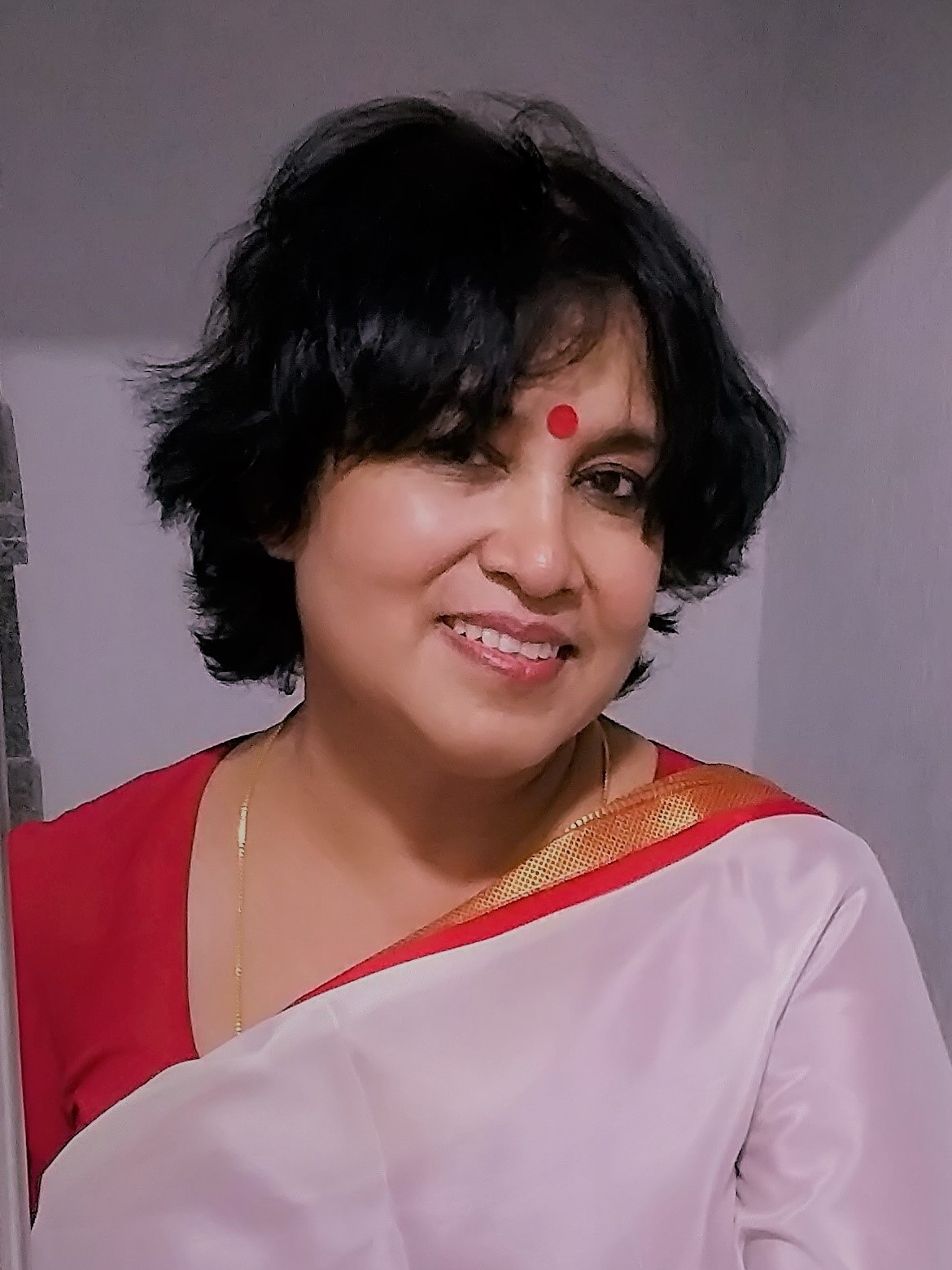
Taslima Nasrin, an atheist Bangladeshi-Swedish writer and feminist, known for her advocacy of secularism and women's rights.

A survey, commissioned by WIN-Gallup International, conducted from 5 November 2014, to 25 November 2014, found that fewer than one per cent of Bangladeshi's said they were "convinced Atheists".

In Bangladesh several people especially bloggers, secularists, liberals, non-religious, Non-Muslims have been brutally killed by extremist Islamic militants for mocking and questioning Islam. Jihadist Islamic militants in the nation are seen as a key challenge by the Bangladeshi authorities. The Islamist ideologies was imported into Bangladesh in the early 1990s by the jihadist returnees of the Soviet–Afghan War, who wanted to turn Bangladesh into a full-fledged Islamic state ruled by the Sharia (Islamic) law.

== Secularism ==
Secularism in Bangladesh is known as "neutrality of religion" (Bengali: ধর্মনিরপেক্ষতা) under Bangladeshi law. In the Constitution of Bangladesh, secularism is mentioned in the preamble as one of the fundamental principles of Bangladeshi law. Article 8 enshrines secularism as one of the fundamental principles of state policy. Article 12 elaborates further on secularism and freedom of religion.

In 1977, after the assassination of Sheikh Mujibur Rahman (in 1975), secularism was removed from the constitution by a Martial Law directive during the military dictatorship of Ziaur Rahman. In 1988, the Parliament of Bangladesh declared Islam as the state religion during the presidency of Hussain Muhammad Ershad. After the restoration of parliamentary democracy in 1990, the Bangladesh Nationalist Party (BNP) and Awami League governments retained Islam as the state religion. In 2010, the Bangladesh Supreme Court ruled that the removal of secularism in 1977 was illegal because it was done by an unconstitutional martial law regime. The court reinstated secularism in the constitution. The principle of secularity now co-exists with the state religion.

Secularism is a recurring topic in Bangladeshi politics. For example, in 2019, a demand by the Hefazat-e-Islam Bangladesh to curtail women's education was dismissed by the Deputy Minister of Education Mohibul Hasan Chowdhury as contrary to the fundamental principles of state policy. The separation of religion and state prevails across large parts of Bangladeshi law. However, family law is based on religious law. A civil marriage is allowed under the Special Marriages Act 1872 only if one renounces faith in either Islam, Hinduism, Buddhism, or Christianity.

== Law, religion, and religious freedom ==
Although Bangladesh initially opted for a secular nationalist ideology as embodied in its Constitution, the principle of secularism was subsequently replaced by a commitment to the Islamic way of life through a series of constitutional amendments and government proclamations between 1977 and 1988. During the eighties, the state was designated exclusively Islamic. In 2010, secularism was restored, but Islam remains the nominal state religion per Article 2 (A).

The Government generally respects this provision in practice; however, some members of the Hindu, Christian, Buddhist, and Ahmadiyya communities experience discrimination. The Government (2001-2006), led by the Four Party Alliance (Bangladesh Nationalist Party, Jamaat-e-Islami, Islami Oikya Jote and Bangladesh Jatiya Party) banned the Ahmadiyya literature by an executive order.

Family laws concerning marriage, divorce, and adoption differ depending on the religion of the person involved. There are no legal restrictions on marriage between members of different faiths. Bangladesh is one of the few Muslim-majority countries where proselytizing is legal, under article 41 of the Constitution, subject to law, public order and morality.

== See also ==
- Religion in South Asia
  - Religion in India
  - Religion in Pakistan
- Major ethnoreligious groups:
  - Bengali Muslims
  - Bengali Hindus
  - Bengali Buddhists
  - Bengali Christians
  - Bengali Sikhs
  - Bengali Baháʼís
  - Bengali Jews
  - Bengali Jains
- Folk deities of Sylhet
