= Behdienkhlam =

Cultural festival in Meghalaya

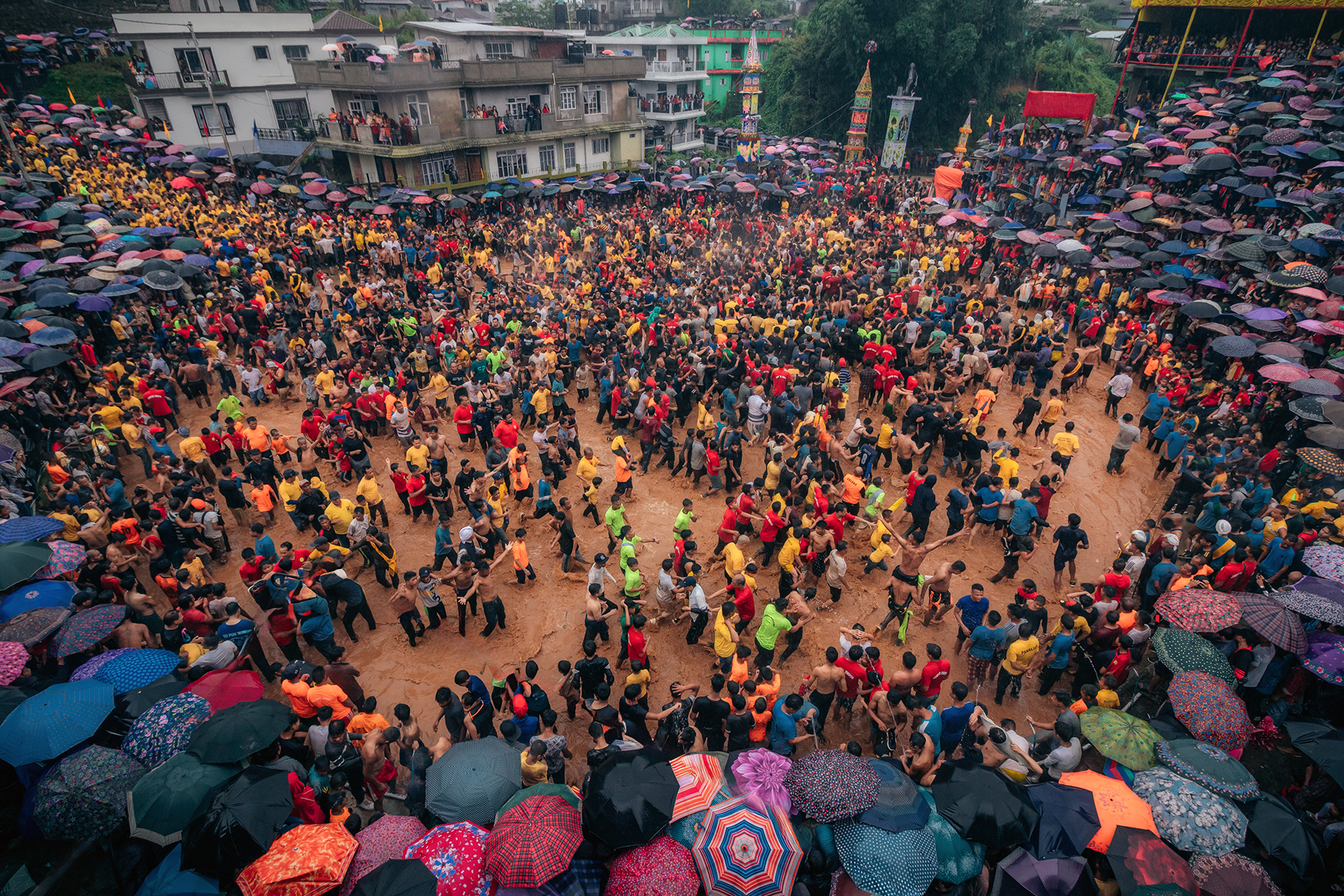
- Observed by: Niamtre followers of Pnar people of Meghalaya
- Significance: Harvest festival Invocation to gods
- Celebrations: decorations, dance, prayers, offerings, games

Behdienkhlam is a festival celebrated primarily by the Pnar people of Meghalaya, India. The festival is celebrated annually in July and is an important dance festival of the Jaintia people. The festival is an invocation to God for warding off evil spirits and diseases and a blessing for a good harvest.

== Etymology ==
Behdienkhlam is derived from two Pnar language words: "behdein" meaning "to drive away" and "khlam" meaning "disease". The festival was intended to celebrate "chasing away the demon of cholera" in response to the eradication of Cholera disease.

== History ==
The festival is celebrated by the Pnar people of Meghalaya. It is the largest festival of the practitioners of the Niamtre religion and is dedicated to a good harvest and a year of plenty. The biggest Behdienkhlam festivities are conducted in Jowai, West Jaintia Hills district and in Tuber Kmai, Jaintia hills. The festival is celebrated annually in July after the sowing season and is an important dance festival. The festival is meant to serve as an invocation to God for wading of bad spirits and diseases and to seek blessings for a good harvest. People pray to the deities of U Mukhai, Mulong, Mooralong and Musniang.

== Practices ==
During this festival, men make a symbolic gesture of driving away the evil spirits and diseases by beating the roofs of houses with bamboo poles. The leading religious figures of the community known as "Daloi" perform religious rites with offerings to ancestors and clans. A ritual known as "Cher iung blai" is conducted, in which the male tribal members enter a newly built thatched hut of grass and bamboo with spears and kill the demons inside it symbolically.

A game similar to football called Dad-lawakor is played with a wooden ball. Another traditional game played is the Iatan-Bhang, a tussle between two opposing groups of people over a large, stripped wooden log over Wah-eit-nar, a muddy trench with the participants smearing mud on one another. The polished logs of wood and bamboo buildings are taken through the neighborhoods and plunged into Aitnar, a central pool of mud on the last day of the festival. People dress up and dance to drums around the Aitnar. Women do not participate in the dancing and offer sacrificial food to the spirits of their forefathers.
