= Niamtre =

Traditional religion of the Jaintia people in Meghalaya, India

- Type: Traditional religion
- Language: Pnar

Niamtre is the indigenous religion practiced by the Pnar people of Meghalaya, India.

== Beliefs ==
Niamtre is centered on a belief in a supreme deity, U Tre Kirot, considered to be the creator of all things.

== Rituals and practices ==
Central to Niamtre are rituals that honor ancestors and nature spirits. The Pnar people perform seasonal ceremonies to ensure a harmonious balance between humans and nature. These rituals are often conducted at sacred groves, known locally as 'Law Kyntang,' which are regarded as holy sites.

=== Festivals ===
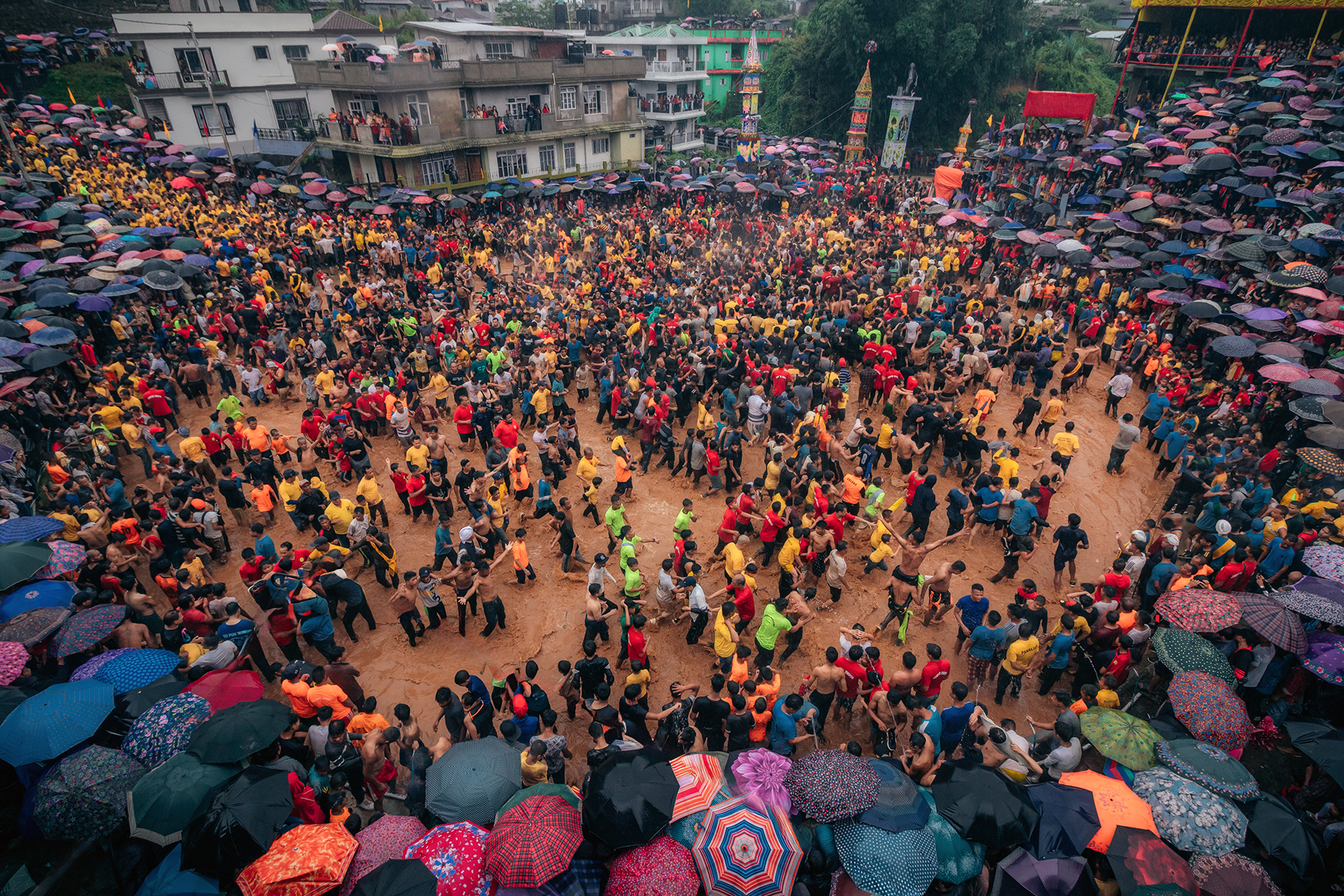
Behdienkhlam festival

One of the major festivals celebrated by Niamtre followers is the Behdienkhlam, a festival intended to drive away diseases and invoke a prosperous harvest season. In the festival, the deities U Mukhai, Mulong, Mooralong and Musniang are worshipping for a good harvest.

Another notable festival is Chad Suk Kara which marks the beginning of the sowing season.

=== Nartiang Temple ===
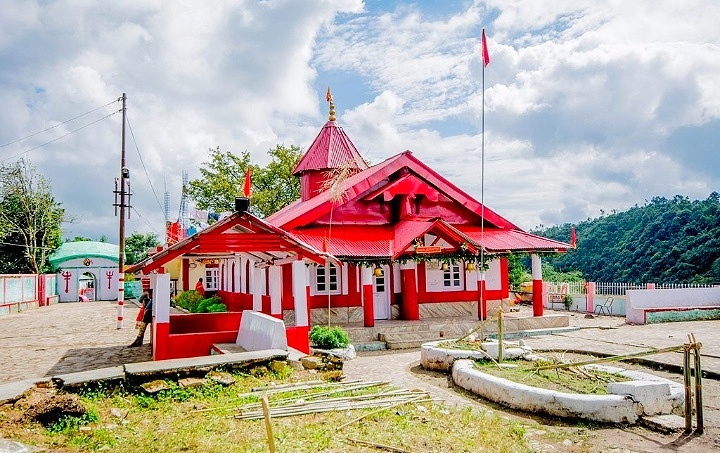
Nartiang Durga Temple

Followers of Niamtre have a longstanding connection with the Nartiang Durga Temple, located in the Jaintia Hills, Meghalaya. Although primarily dedicated to the Hindu goddess Durga, the temple is also significant to Niamtre practitioners, who historically worshipped at the site. The Jaintia kings, who were followers of Niamtre, established the temple in the 17th century, blending local beliefs with Hindu practices. This shared space illustrates the syncretism between Niamtre and Hinduism, where both religious traditions are practiced in a harmonious manner.

During festivals like Behdienkhlam, Niamtre practitioners sometimes make offerings at the Nartiang Temple, believing that their prayers reach a shared divine presence. The stone monoliths around Nartiang, which represent ancestral spirits, are also respected by both Hindu and Niamtre followers.

During the Durga Puja festival, the Durga idol is not used in the Nartiang temple because Niamtre followers do not worship idols. Instead, the trunk of a banana tree is used.

The soil and water from the Syntu Ksiar River in Jowai and Myntang River from Nartiang village was also collected for the Bhumi Pooja of Ayodhya Ram temple.

== Demographics ==
The followers of Niamtre are primarily found among the Pnar people of Meghalaya, particularly in the Jaintia Hills region. As per the 2011 census, there are 81,000 people in Meghalaya following the Niamtre religion. Their population has been declining.

== Recognition ==
Niamtre is not recognised as a minority religion by the state or central government, though followers have been demanding it. In 2026, the community demanded to be included as a separate religion in the upcoming census.

== See also ==
- Jaintia people
- Behdienkhlam
- Meghalaya
