= Pnar people =

Sub-tribal group of the Khasi people in Meghalaya, India

Pnar (Jaiñtia or Synteng)
Total population
- 395,124 (2011)

Regions with significant populations
- Meghalaya, India: 393,124 (2011)
- Assam, India: 2,169 (2011)

Languages
- Pnar

Religion
- Christianity (Catholic & Protestant) 60% & Niamtre 40%

Related ethnic groups
- Khasi people

The Pnar, also known as Jaiñtia, are a sub-tribal group of the Khasi people in Meghalaya, India. The Pnar people are matrilineal. They speak the Pnar language, which belongs to the Austro-Asiatic language family and is very similar to the Khasi language. The Pnar people are native to the West Jaintia Hills and East Jaintia Hills District of Meghalaya, India. They call themselves "Ki Khun Hynñiew Trep" (Children of 7-hut). Their main festivals are Behdeinkhlam, Chad Suk-kara, Chad Pastieh and Laho Dance.

== Etymology ==
The name "Pnar" is an endonym, while "Jaiñtia" and "Synteng" are exonyms. The word "Jaiñtia" is derived from the name of a former kingdom, the Jaintia Kingdom, whose rulers were Syntengs. One theory says that the word "Jaiñtia" is ultimately derived from the name of the shrine of Jayanti Devi or Jainteswari, an incarnation of the Hindu goddess Durga. Another theory says that the name is derived via Synteng from Sutong, a former settlement; the myth of Jayanti Devi was probably created after the Hinduisation of the Jaintia kingdom.

== History ==
As with all sub-tribes of the Khasi tribe, the Pnars have no recorded history of their own; however, they are mentioned in the Buranji chronicles of Assam and the British records.

Like all the other sub-tribes of the Khasi tribe, the Pnar people also claim descent from Ki Hynñiew Trep [ seven 'huts' (derived from - ïing 'Trep') or seven families ]. The rulers of the medieval Jaintia Kingdom belonged to the Synteng community. The Kingdom was annexed by the British East India Company in 1835 and merged into the Assam province. The Jaintia Hills district was established in the region after the establishment of the Meghalaya state in independent India in 1972. There are also Pnar people in the Jaintiapur upazila, Sylhet, Bangladesh.

== Religion ==
The original tribal religion of the Pnars is known as Niamtre. The Pnar tribals believe that their religion is God-given (not founded by man) and comes to this world by God's decree. The three cardinal principles dictated by God are kamai yei hok, tipbru tipblai and tipkur tipkha. They signify right living and practice based on right livelihood; fulfillment of duties towards fellow men to reach God; and showing respect to the members of one's father's and mother's clans. Therefore, Niamtre stresses equal weight to be given to fellow humans to attain the realisation of God.

Religion-wise, out of 4 lakh Jaintias, around 2.4 lakh (60% of the ethnic population) professed Christian faith of various denominations, particularly Catholic and Protestant, and the remaining 1.6 lakh (40% of the ethnic population) practice their original tribal religion called "Ka Niamtre".
