= 2004 Indian general election in Assam =

- April–May 2004

14 seats
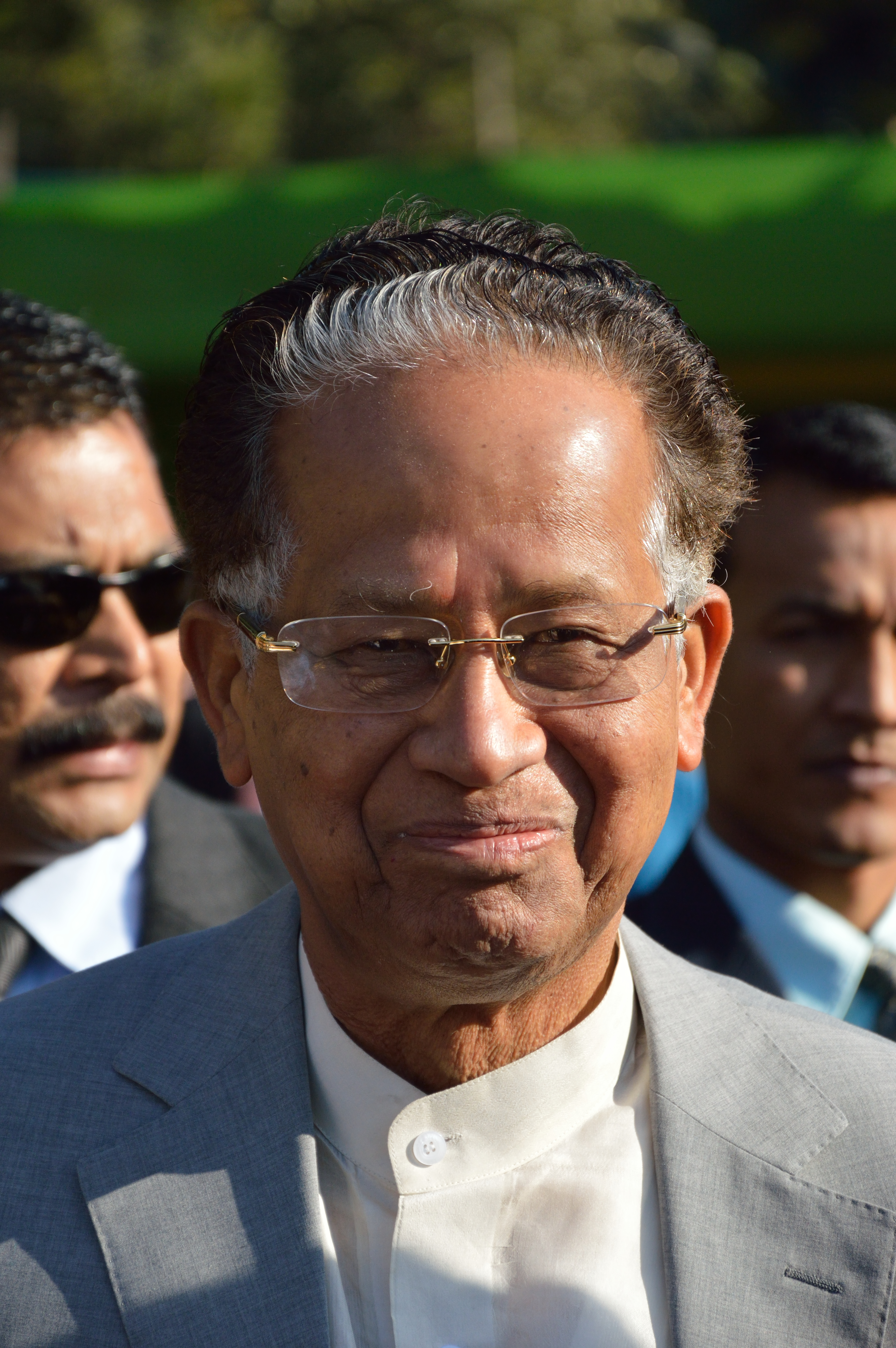

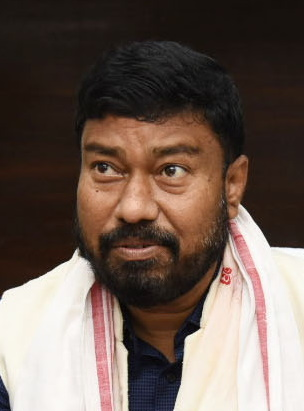
	First party	Second party	Third party
			AGP
Leader	Tarun Gogoi	Rameshwar Teli	Brindaban Goswami
Party	INC	BJP	Asom Gana Parishad
Last election	10	2	0
Seats won	9	2	2
Seat change	▼1	Steady	▲2
Popular vote	3,637,405	2,379,524	2,069,600
Percentage	35.07%	22.94%	19.95%
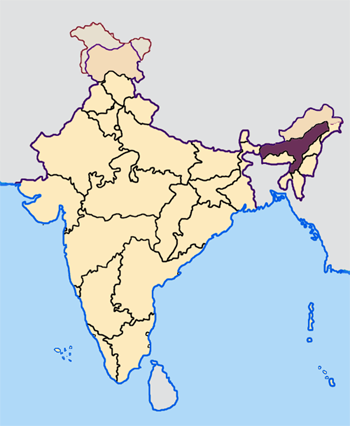
- Assam
Prime Minister before election
A. B. Vajpayee
BJP
Prime Minister after election
Manmohan Singh
INC

The 2004 Indian general election polls in Assam were held for 14 seats in the state. The result was United Progressive Alliance winning nine out of the 14 seats, while the National Democratic Alliance, captured only three seats. Asom Gana Parishad managed to get two seats.

In Assam, there was a three-cornered contest between Congress, BJP and Asom Gana Parishad (the main regional party of the state). Congress contested all 14 seats in the states, BJP 12 and AGP 12. BJP supported one JD(U) candidate and the Bodo nationalist candidate in Kokrajhar. The left parties (CPI(M), CPI and CPI(ML)L) had a joint front. Congress won nine seats. AGP got a comeback, winning two seats. BJP also won two seats, although one of them was the popular singer Bhupen Hazarika. Hazarika stood in Guwahati, and his election ought to reflect his personal popularity, rather than that of the party he had just joined. CPI(ML)L lost its seat in the Karbi Anlong hills, largely due to a split in their mass organisation there and the resurgence of communal violence in the area. In Kokrajhar the Bodo nationalist and NDA-supported candidate, Sansuma Khunggur Bwiswmuthiary, retained his seat.

== Schedule ==
The schedule of the election was announced by the Election Commission of India on 29 February 2004.

Poll event	Phase	
Poll event	1	2
Date of announcement	29 February 2004	
Notification date	24 March 2004	31 March 2004
Last date for filing nomination	31 March 2004	7 April 2004
Scrutiny of nomination	2 April 2004	8 April 2004
Last date for withdrawal of nomination	5 April 2004	10 April 2004
Date of poll	20 April 2004	26 April 2004
Date of counting of votes	13 May 2004	
No. of constituencies	6	8

== Parties and alliances ==
=== United Progressive Alliance ===
Party	Flag	Symbol	Leader	Seats contested
Indian National Congress			Tarun Gogoi	14

=== National Democratic Alliance ===
Party	Flag	Symbol	Leader	Seats contested
Bharatiya Janata Party			Rameshwar Teli	12
Janata Dal (United)			Nitish Kumar	1
Independent			Sansuma Khunggur Bwiswmuthiary	1

=== Asom Gana Parishad ===
Party	Flag	Symbol	Leader	Seats contested
Asom Gana Parishad			Brindaban Goswami	12

== List of candidates ==
Constituency							
Constituency		UPA		NDA		AGP	
1	Karimganj (SC)	INC	Lalit Mohan Suklabaidya	BJP	Parimal Suklabaidya	AGP	Nepal Chandra Das
2	Silchar	INC	Santosh Mohan Dev	BJP	Kabindra Purkayastha		
3	Autonomous District (ST)	INC	Biren Sing Engti	BJP	Ratan Teron	AGP	Sailendra Hasnu
4	Dhubri	INC	Anwar Hussain	BJP	Jabeen Borbhuyan	AGP	Afzalur Rahman
5	Kokrajhar (ST)	INC	Derhagra Mochahary	IND	S. K. Bwiswmuthiary		
6	Barpeta	INC	A. F. Golam Osmani	BJP	Ranjit Thakuria	AGP	Kumar Deepak Das
7	Gauhati	INC	Kirip Chaliha	BJP	Bhupen Hazarika	AGP	Bhrigu Kumar Phukan
8	Mangaldoi	INC	Madhab Rajbangshi	BJP	Narayan Chandra Borkataky	AGP	Apurba Bhattacharjee
9	Tezpur	INC	Moni Kumar Subba	BJP	Ghisa Lal Agarwalla	AGP	Padma Hazarika
10	Nowgong	INC	Bishnu Prasad	BJP	Rajen Gohain	AGP	Dhruba Kumar Saikia
11	Kaliabor	INC	Dip Gogoi]	JD(U)	Rashidul Haque	AGP	Keshab Mahanta
12	Jorhat	INC	Bijoy Krishna Handique	BJP	Dayananda Borgohain	AGP	Dulal Chandra Baruah
13	Dibrugarh	INC	Paban Singh Ghatowar	BJP	Kamakhya Prasad Tasa	AGP	Sarbananda Sonowal
14	Lakhimpur	INC	Ranee Narah	BJP	Uday Shankar Hazarika	AGP	Arun Kumar Sarmah

== Results by Alliance ==
Coalition/Alliance	Parties contesting in Assam from the Alliance in 1999	Seats won in 1999 Election	Parties contesting in Assam from the Alliance in 2004	Seats won in 2004 Election	Swing
National Democratic Alliance	-Bharatiya Janata Party (2) -Asom Gana Parishad	2	Bharatiya Janata Party	2	0
United Progressive Alliance	Indian National Congress*	10	Indian National Congress	9	−1
Left Front	-Communist Party of India -Communist Party of India -Communist Party of India (Marxist–Leninist) Liberation (1)	1	-Communist Party of India -Communist Party of India -Communist Party of India (Marxist–Leninist) Liberation	0	−1
Other parties	Independent	1	-Asom Gana Parishad (2) -Independent (1)	3	+2

- Note: UPA was not in existence in 1999, instead the number of seats won in 1999, represents the seats won by Indian National Congress
- Note: Left front, was not part of the UPA, in 2004, instead gave outside support.

== Results by Party ==
Alliance/ Party		Popular vote			Seats		
Alliance/ Party		Votes	%	±pp	Contested	Won	+/−
INC		36,37,405	35.07	▼3.35	14	9	▼1
NDA	BJP	23,79,524	22.94	▼6.90	12	2	Steady
NDA	IND	6,89,620	6.65	Steady	1	1	▲1
NDA	JD(U)	1,25,966	1.21	Steady	1	0	Steady
NDA	Total	31,95,110	30.80	Steady	14	3	Steady
AGP		20,69,600	19.95	▲8.03	12	2	▲2
CPI		1,72,332	1.66	▲1.08	1	0	Steady
CPI(M-L)L		1,08,837	1.05	▼1.20	3	0	▼1
SP		1,09,088	1.05	▲0.85	4	0	Steady
ASDC		1,01,808	0.98	Steady	1	0	Steady
CPI(M)		68,627	0.66	▼1.11	2	0	Steady
Others		2,07,964	2.00	Steady	19	0	Steady
IND		7,01,318	6.76	▼2.60	46	0	▼1
Total		1,03,72,089	100%	-	116	14	-

== Results by constituency ==
Keys: INC (9) BJP (2) AGP (2) IND (1)

Constituency		Winner				Runner Up				Margin	%
#	Name	Candidate	Party	Votes	%	Candidate	Party	Votes	%	Margin	%
1	Karimganj (SC)	Lalit Suklabaidya	INC	3,21,059	47.81	Parimal Suklabaidya	BJP	2,29,111	34.12	91,948	13.69
2	Silchar	Santosh Mohan Dev	INC	2,46,215	40.48	Kabindra Purkayastha	BJP	2,24,895	36.98	21,320	3.50
3	Auton. District (ST)	Biren Sing Engti	INC	1,25,937	31.38	Elwin Teron	ASDC	1,01,808	25.36	24,129	6.02
4	Dhubri	Anwar Hussain	INC	3,76,588	43.61	Afzalur Rahman	AGP	2,59,966	30.10	1,16,622	13.51
5	Kokrajhar (ST)	S. K. Bwiswmuthiary	IND	6,89,620	71.32	Sabda Ram Rabha	IND	2,05,491	21.25	4,84,129	50.07
6	Barpeta	A. F. Golam Osmani	INC	2,66,972	35.00	Kumar Deepak Das	AGP	1,98,847	26.07	68,125	8.93
7	Gauhati	Kirip Chaliha	INC	3,53,250	40.06	Bhupen Hazarika	BJP	2,92,099	33.13	61,151	6.93
8	Mangaldoi	Narayan Borkataky	BJP	3,45,863	40.74	Madhab Rajbangshi	INC	3,15,997	37.22	29,866	3.52
9	Tezpur	Moni Kumar Subba	INC	2,89,847	40.27	Padma Hazarika	AGP	2,19,402	30.48	70,445	9.79
10	Nowgong	Rajen Gohain	BJP	3,42,704	43.60	Bisnu Prasad	INC	3,11,292	39.60	31,412	4.00
11	Kaliabor	Dip Gogoi	INC	3,01,893	39.56	Keshab Mahanta	AGP	2,34,695	30.76	67,198	8.80
12	Jorhat	Bijoy Krishna Handique	INC	2,23,624	33.54	Drupad Borgohain	CPI	1,72,332	25.84	51,292	7.70
13	Dibrugarh	Sarbananda Sonowal	AGP	2,20,944	35.00	Kamakhya Tasa	BJP	2,02,390	32.06	18,554	2.94
14	Lakhimpur	Arun Sarmah	AGP	3,00,865	37.61	Ranee Narah	INC	2,72,717	34.09	28,148	3.52

== Post-election Union Council of Ministers from Assam ==
#	Name	Constituency	Designation	Department	From	To	Party
1	Manmohan Singh	Rajya Sabha (Assam)	Prime Minister	Ministry of Personnel, Public Grievances and Pensions; Ministry of Planning; Department of Atomic Energy; Department of Space	22 May 2004	22 May 2009	INC
2	Santosh Mohan Dev	Silchar (Lok Sabha)	MoS (I/C); Cabinet Minister (from 29 Jan 2006)	Ministry of Heavy Industries and Public Enterprises; Ministry of Water Resources (18 Nov 2005 – 29 Jan 2006)	23 May 2004	22 May 2009	INC
3	Bijoy Krishna Handique	Jorhat (Lok Sabha)	MoS	Ministry of Parliamentary Affairs (until 6 April 2008); Ministry of Defence (until 29 Jan 2006); Ministry of Chemicals and Fertilizers (from 29 Jan 2006); Ministry of Mines (from 6 April 2008)	23 May 2004	22 May 2009	INC

== Results by constituency ==
General Election, 2004: Karimganj
Party	Candidate	Votes	%	±%
INC	Lalit Mohan Suklabaidya	321,059	47.81	
BJP	Parimal Sukla Baidya	229,111	34.12	
AGP	Nepal Chandra Das	106,546	15.87	
Independent	Babul Ram Das	3,925	0.58	
Independent	Sushil Kumar Das	3,641	0.54	
Independent	Radha Kanta Tanty	2,862	0.43	
Independent	Lukendra Roy	2,386	0.36	
Independent	Babul Roy	1,960	0.29	
Majority		91,948		
Turnout		671,491	68.91	
INC hold		Swing		

General Election, 2004: Autonomous District
Party	Candidate	Votes	%	±%
INC	Biren Singh Engti	125,937	31.38	
ASDC(U)	Elwin Teron	101,808	25.36	
CPI(ML)L	Dr. Jayanta Rongpi	74,399	18.54	
BJP	Ratan Teron	57,584	14.35	
Independent	Sanmoni Temprai	26,713	6.66	
Independent	Chember G. Momin	8,003	1.99	
AGP	Sailendra Hasnu	3,755	0.94	
SAP	Harsing Teron	3,178	0.79	
Majority		24,129		
Turnout		401,377	69.42	
INC gain from CPI(ML)L		Swing		
