= Mofida =

Mofida or Moufida is a given name. Notable people with the given name include:

- Mofida Ahmed (1921–2008), Indian politician
- Moufida Tlatli (1947–2021), Tunisian film director, screenwriter, and editor
