= Dulal Baruah =

Indian politician

Dulal Chandra Baruah

Deputy Chief Minister, Assam
- In office 12 March 1978 - 1979
- Chief Minister: Golap Borbora

Minister for Public Works Department, Supply, Trade and Commerce, Parliamentary Affairs and Jails
- In office 12 March 1978 - 1979
- Chief Minister: Golap Borbora

Member of Assam Legislative Assembly
- In office 1978 - 1983
- Preceded by: Bijoy Krishna Handique
- Succeeded by: Dinanath Rajkhowa
- Constituency: Jorhat
- In office 1972-1978
- Preceded by: constituency established
- Succeeded by: constituency abolished
- Constituency: Charaibahi
- In office 1962-1967
- Preceded by: Mahidhar Pegu
- Succeeded by: J. Saikia
- Constituency: Jorhat

Personal details
- Born: 1 January 1932 Dhakuakhana, North Lakhimpur
- Died: 4 October 2008 (aged 76) Mumbai
- Party: Asom Gana Parishad (2004-2008)
- Other political affiliations: Bharatiya Janata Party (1999-2004) Janata Party (1978-1983) Independent (1962-1978)
- Spouse: Chandra Prava Barua (m. 1957, died)
- Children: 4
- Parent: Jogendra Nath Baruah (Father)

Dulal Chandra Baruah (1 January 1932 - 4 October 2008) was a politician from Assam and president of the Janata Dal (United) state unit. He was deputy chief minister and Planning and Works Department minister in the Government of Assam headed by Golap Borbora in 1979. He was a Member of Assam Legislative Assembly for Jorhat and Charaibahi.

== Early life and education ==
Baruah was born on 1 January 1932, the son of the late Jogendra Nath Baruah. He had a B.A from 1957. He was educated at Dhakuakhana, Cotton College, Gauhati and St Anthony’s College, Shillong.

== Early career ==
Barua was appointed a secret agent of the Congress organisation for passing secret and important messages in 1942. He represented All India Student Congress, New Delhi in 1947. He entered government service in 1951 and resigned in 1960 to join post graduate classes.

== Political career ==
Baruah was an independent candidate in the 1962 Assam Legislative Assembly election. He received 7848 votes and won the Jorhat seat. He served until the 1967 Assam Legislative Assembly election where he did not seek reelection in Jorhat. He was succeeded by J. Saikia.

In the 1972 Assam Legislative Assembly election, Baruah sought the newly established constituency of Charaibahi as an independent candidate. Baruah received 13082 votes, 50.33% of the total vote. He defeated his nearest opponent, an Indian National Congress candidate, by 3208 votes. He served until the 1978 Assam Legislative Assembly election, when the constituency was later abolished. He instead sought in the 1978 Assam Legislative Assembly Election the Jorhat seat as a Janata Party candidate. He received 22530 votes, 53.88% of the total vote. He defeated his nearest opponent by 14963 votes and became the MLA for Jorhat again.

Baruah was made Deputy Chief Minister of Assam under Chief Minister Golap Borbora as well as being the PWD minister. He served until 1979. He did not seek reelection in Jorhat in the 1983 Assam Legislative Assembly election.

He joined BJP in 1999 at the behest of Prime Minister Atal Bihari Vajpayee after being promised a ticket but was later denied this due to him being a newcomer in 2004. He resigned from the party and later joined Asom Gana Parishad, he was then made the AGP candidate for the Jorhat Lok Sabha constituency but lost.

== Death ==
Suffering from cancer, he died on 4 October 2008 in a private hospital in Mumbai and was survived by his daughter and two sons. His wife had predeceased him.
