= Jorhat Assembly constituency =

Constituency of the Assam legislative assembly in India

Jorhat
- Constituency No. 100 for the Assam Legislative Assembly

Constituency details
- Country: India
- Region: Northeast India
- State: Assam
- District: Jorhat
- Lok Sabha constituency: Jorhat
- Established: 1951
- Reservation: None

Member of Legislative Assembly
- 16th Assam Legislative Assembly
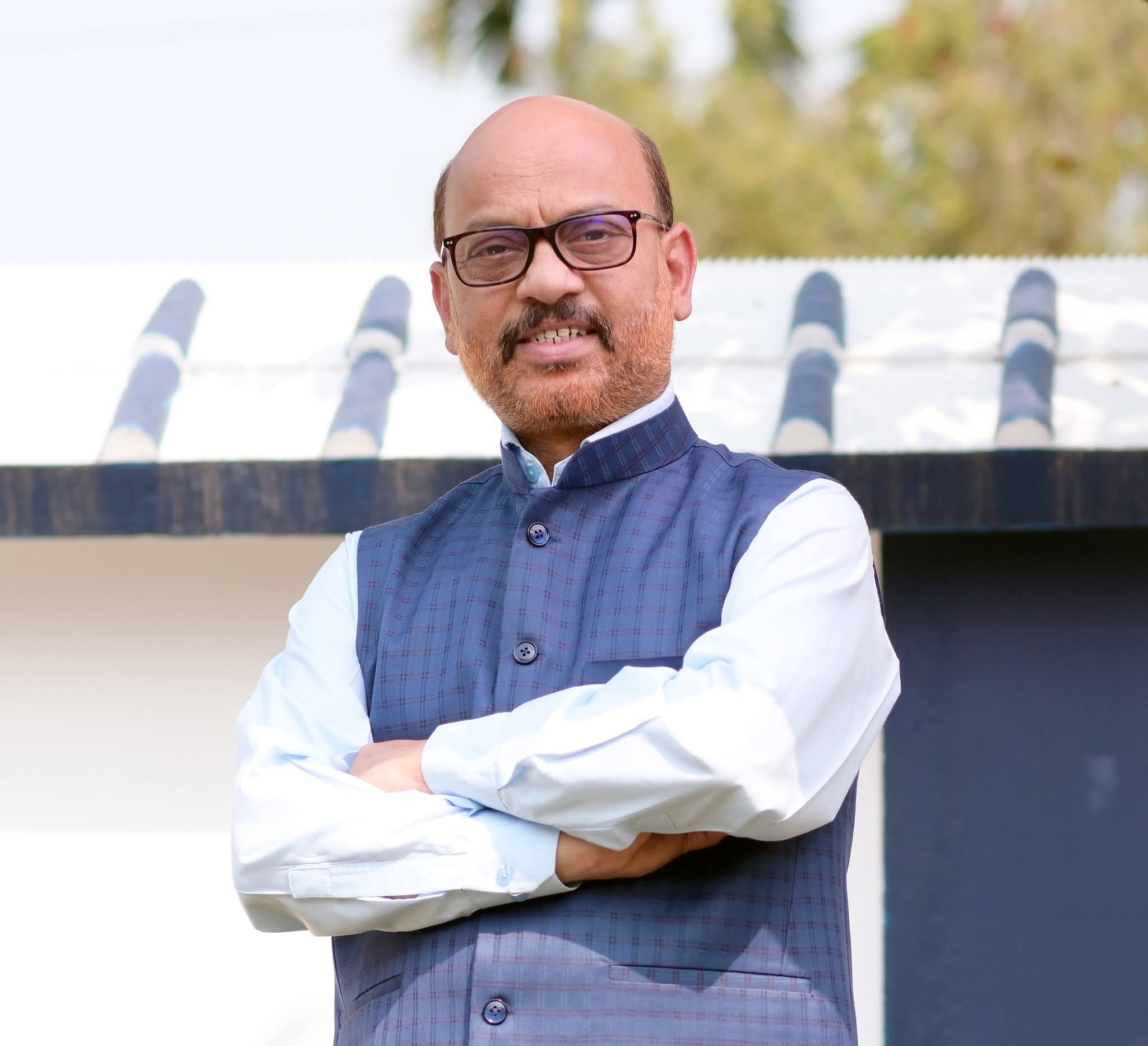
- Incumbent Hitendra Nath Goswami
- Party: BJP
- Elected year: 2021

Jorhat Assembly constituency is one of the 126 assembly constituencies of Assam Legislative Assembly. Jorhat forms part of the Jorhat Lok Sabha constituency. The longest serving representative of the constituency is Shri Hitendra Nath Goswami who is heading for last 22 years.

Most successful parties from Jorhat Assembly Constituency
1. Indian National Congress (7 Times) (41.2%)
2. Asom Gana Parishad (3 Times) (20.0%)
3. Bharatiya Janata Party ( 3 Times) (18.8%)
4. Independent ( 2 Time) (13.3%)
5. Janata Party( 1 Time) (6.67%)

== Members of Legislative Assembly ==
INC Independent JP AGP BJP

Election	Member	Party affiliation
1952	Debeswar Sarmah	Indian National Congress
1957	Mahidhar Pegu	Indian National Congress
1962	Dulal Chandra Barua	Independent
1967	J. Saikia	Indian National Congress
1972	Bijoy Krishna Handique	Indian National Congress
1978	Dulal Chandra Barua	Janata Party
1983	Dinanath Rajkhowa	Indian National Congress
1985	Abhijit Sarmah	Independent
1991	Hitendra Nath Goswami	Asom Gana Parishad
1996	Hitendra Nath Goswami	Asom Gana Parishad
2001	Hitendra Nath Goswami	Asom Gana Parishad
2006	Rana Goswami	Indian National Congress
2011	Rana Goswami	Indian National Congress
2016	Hitendra Nath Goswami	Bharatiya Janata Party
2021	Hitendra Nath Goswami	Bharatiya Janata Party
2026	Hitendra Nath Goswami	Bharatiya Janata Party

== Election results ==
=== 2026 ===
2026 Assam Legislative Assembly election: Jorhat
Party	Candidate	Votes	%	±%
BJP	Hitendra Nath Goswami	69,439	58.7	
INC	Gaurav Gogoi	46,257	39.1	
AAP	Pranab Priyankush Dutta	701	0.59	
SUCI(C)	Hemanta Kumar Pegu	581	0.49	
NOTA	None of the above	1,319	1.11	
Margin of victory		23,182		
Turnout		118,297		
Rejected ballots				
Registered electors		148,280		
BJP hold		Swing		

=== 2021 ===
2021 Assam Legislative Assembly election: Jorhat
Party	Candidate	Votes	%	±%
BJP	Hitendra Nath Goswami	68,321	48.84	−4.46
INC	Rana Goswami	61,833	44.20	1.72
AJP	Nirod Changkakoti	6,925	4.95	4.95
Independent	Ranjit Baruah	1,100	0.79	
NOTA	None of the above	1,717	1.23	0.33
Majority		6,488	4.64	−5.78
Turnout		1,39,896	75.29	−4.66
Registered electors		1,85,804		
BJP hold		Swing	{{{swing}}}	

=== 2016 ===
2016 Assam Legislative Assembly election: Jorhat
Party	Candidate	Votes	%	±%
BJP	Hitendra Nath Goswami	69,209	52.90	
INC	Rana Goswami	55,571	42.48	
CPI(M)	Nirmal Gogoi	1,548	1.18	
LDP	Prodyut Bora	1,372	1.04	
AIUDF	Sanjeev Rajkhowa	842	0.64	
Independent	Bhaskar Jyoti Mahanta	635	0.48	
Independent	Jiban Chandra Sarmah	448	0.34	
NOTA	None of the above	1,184	0.90	
Majority		13,638	10.42	
Turnout		1,30,809	79.95	
Registered electors		1,63,602		
BJP gain from INC		Swing		

=== 2011 ===
2011 Assam Legislative Assembly election:Jorhat
Party	Candidate	Votes	%	±%
INC	Rana Goswami	68049	64.85	
AGP	Hitendra Nath Goswami	30079	28.67	
BJP	Karabi Chakraborty	5354	5.1	
AITC	Sarifun Nisha	1449	1.38	
Majority		37970		
Turnout		104391		
Registered electors		133,959		
INC hold		Swing	{{{swing}}}	

=== 2006 ===
2006 Assam Legislative Assembly election:Jorhat
Party	Candidate	Votes	%	±%
INC	Rana Goswami	49742	48.79	
AGP	Hitendra Nath Goswami	44862	44	
BJP	Yadab Doloi	5176	5.07	
AGP(P)	Deepanjali Bora	1271	1.24	
JD(U)	Amardip Singh	897	0.8	
Majority		4,880		
Turnout		101948		
Registered electors		145,426		
INC gain from AGP		Swing	{{{swing}}}	

=== 2001 ===
2001 Assam Legislative Assembly election: Jorhat
Party	Candidate	Votes	%	±%
AGP	Hitendra Nath Goswami	39,421	49.52	
INC	Padma Nath Sarma	33,380	41.93	
NCP	Nirmal Goswami	2,119	2.66	
Independent	Sumanta Chaliha	1,736	2.18	
Independent	Dimbeswar Borah	1,329	1.67	
CPI(ML)L	Kanaklata Dutta	769	0.97	
Independent	Jadab Khound	411	0.52	
Independent	Dr. Abhijit Kumar Gogoi	223	0.28	
Independent	Lakhmidhar Borah	223	0.28	
Majority		6,041	7.59	
Turnout		79,611	63.52	
Registered electors		127,505		
AGP hold		Swing	{{{swing}}}	

=== 1996 ===
1996 Assam Legislative Assembly election: Jorhat
Party	Candidate	Votes	%	±%
AGP	Hitendra Nath Goswami	36,890	49.88	
INC	Padmanath Sarma	22,200	30.02	
JD	Dulal Borua	11,280	15.25	
BJP	Palit Bora	3,147	4.26	
AIIC(T)	Tosheswar Dutta	440	0.59	
Majority		14,690	19.86	
Turnout		73,957	66.74	
Registered electors		114,720		
AGP hold		Swing	{{{swing}}}	

=== 1991 ===
1991 Assam Legislative Assembly election: Jorhat
Party	Candidate	Votes	%	±%
AGP	Hitendra Nath Goswami	23,249	39.31	
INC	Dina Nath Rajkhowa	20,451	34.58	
NAGP	Pradip Mahanta	5190	8.77	
Independent	Samiran Bordoloi	2,762	4.67	
Independent	Satyendra Kumar Kataky	1,697	2.87	
JD	Devananda Bora	1,548	2.62	
Independent	Kabin Khound	826	1.40	
Independent	Prasanta Katani	566	0.96	
United Reservation Movement Council	Baharuddin Ahmed	538	0.91	
Independent	Hem Bora	416	0.70	
Independent	Lakhi Goswami	414	0.70	
Asom Jatiyatabadi Dal	Dilipeswar Bora	412	0.70	
Independent	Jyoti Prasad	409	0.69	
Independent	Tosheswar Borua	318	0.54	
Independent	Premananda Goswami	277	0.47	
Independent	Mridula Barkakoti	75	0.13	
Majority		2,798	4.73	
Turnout		59,148	60.00	
Registered electors		102,675		
AGP gain from Independent Politician		Swing	{{{swing}}}	

=== 1985 ===
1985 Assam Legislative Assembly election: Jorhat
Party	Candidate	Votes	%	±%
Independent Politician	Abhijit Sarmah	43,382	68.62	
INC	Dina Nath Rajkhowa	15,691	24.82	
JP	Dulal Baruah	2,840	4.49	
Independent	Girin Baruah	744	1.18	
BJP	Ram Kumar Baruah	398	0.63	
Independent	Pulak Chandra Gogoi	163	0.26	
Majority		27,691	43.8	
Turnout		63,218	72.78	
Registered electors		89,611		
Independent Politician gain from INC		Swing	{{{swing}}}	

=== 1983 ===
1983 Assam Legislative Assembly election: Jorhat
Party	Candidate	Votes	%	±%
INC	Dina Nath Rajkhowa	968	78.89	
CPI(M)	Surendranath Hazarika	158	12.88	
Independent	Lutfur Rahman	63	5.13	
Independent	Nabin Neog	38	3.10	
Majority		810	66.01	
Turnout		1227	1.84	
Registered electors		72,377		
INC gain from Janata party		Swing	{{{swing}}}	

=== 1978 ===
1978 Assam Legislative Assembly election: Jorhat
Party	Candidate	Votes	%	±%
JP	Dulal Baruah	22,530	53.88	
CPI(M)	Dilip Bhattacharya	7837	18.74	
INC	Nirmal Goswami	7663	18.33	
Indian National Congress - I	Kushram Sarmah	2916	6.97	
Independent	Nabin Chandra Bora	389	0.93	
Independent	Jitenjit Baruah	262	0.63	
Independent	Shrimanta Madhab	219	0.52	
Majority		14,693	35.14	
Turnout		41,816	64.21	
Registered electors		66,260		
JP gain from INC		Swing	{{{swing}}}	

=== 1972 ===
1972 Assam Legislative Assembly election: Jorhat
Party	Candidate	Votes	%	±%
INC	Bijoy Krishna Handique	15,175	53.55	
Independent	Jogen Saikia	10,045	35.44	
SSP	Banghidhar Dutta	3120	11.01	
Majority		5,130	18.11	
Turnout		28,340	56.09	
Registered electors		51,844		
INC hold		Swing	{{{swing}}}	

=== 1967 ===
1967 Assam Legislative Assembly election: Jorhat
Party	Candidate	Votes	%	±%
INC	J. Saikia	11,921	49.18	
PSP	A. C. Barooah	11,249	46.41	
Independent	P. Barkakati	1,069	4.41	
Majority		672	2.77	
Turnout		24,239	57.94	
Registered electors		44,692		
INC gain from Independent Politician		Swing	{{{swing}}}	

=== 1962 ===
1962 Assam Legislative Assembly election: Jorhat
Party	Candidate	Votes	%	±%
Independent	Dulal Baruah	7848	30.04	
PSP	Bangshidhar Dutta	7188	27.51	
INC	Harinarayan Baruah	6,734	25.78	
Independent	Nil Kamal Bezbarua	2518	9.64	
CPI	Kirti Nath Bordoloi	1130	4.33	
Independent	Suresh Chandra Barua	493	1.89	
Independent	Chandrika Prasad Sahu	215	0.82	
Majority		660	2.53	
Turnout		26,126	52.67	
Registered electors		54,444		
Independent Politician gain from INC		Swing	{{{swing}}}	
