= Gaurav Gogoi =

Indian politician (born 1982)

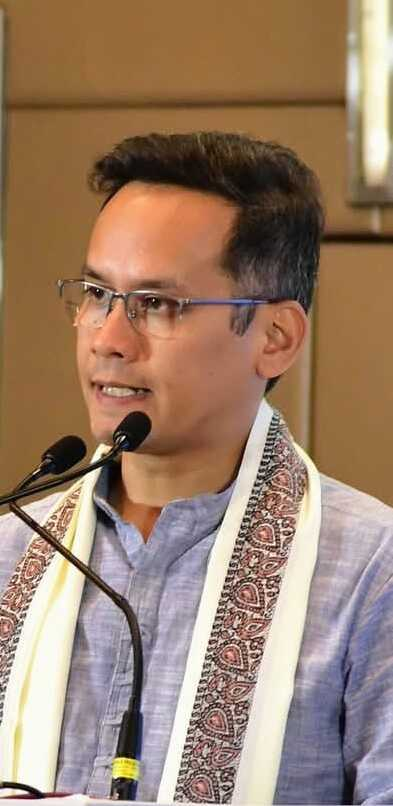

Deputy Leader of the Opposition in Lok Sabha
- Incumbent
- Assumed office 14 July 2024
- Leader: Rahul Gandhi
- Speaker: Om Birla
- Preceded by: Gopinath Munde (2014)

President Assam Pradesh Congress Committee
- Incumbent
- Assumed office 26 May 2025
- Preceded by: Bhupen Kumar Borah

Member of Parliament, Lok Sabha
- Incumbent
- Assumed office 4 June 2024
- Preceded by: Topon Kumar Gogoi
- Constituency: Jorhat, Assam
- In office 16 May 2014 – 4 June 2024
- Preceded by: Dip Gogoi
- Succeeded by: Constituency abolished
- Constituency: Kaliabor, Assam

Personal details
- Born: 4 September 1982 (age 44) Delhi, India
- Party: Indian National Congress
- Spouse: Elizabeth Colebourn (m. 2013)
- Children: 2
- Parents: Tarun Gogoi (father); Dolly Gogoi (mother)
- Education: Guru Gobind Singh Indraprastha University; New York University (MPA)
- Occupation: Social worker; politician

Gaurav Gogoi (born 4 September 1982) is an Indian politician from Assam who, since 2024, has served as the Deputy Leader of the Opposition in the Lok Sabha from the Indian National Congress, and, as the Member of Parliament for Jorhat Lok Sabha Constituency. He was elected President of the Assam Pradesh Congress Committee in 2025. He was the deputy leader of the Congress Parliamentary Party from 2020 to 2024. He represented Kaliabor in the Lok Sabha from 2014 to 2024. Gogoi is the son of Tarun Gogoi, who was the Chief Minister of Assam from 2001 to 2016.

== Early life and personal life ==
Gaurav Gogoi was born in Delhi on 4 September 1982. His father, Tarun Gogoi, served as the Chief Minister of Assam from 2001 to 2016, and was the longest-serving chief minister of the state.

Gogoi studied at St. Columba's School, Delhi. He then completed a B.Tech. degree in Electronics and Communication Engineering in 2004 from Guru Gobind Singh Indraprastha University, Delhi, and then joined the marketing team of Airtel. He left his job at Airtel to join a Delhi-based NGO called Pravah in 2005. He later went to the United States of America to study public administration. He holds a Master of Public Administration from New York University. He also enjoys dancing and choreography.

In 2013, Gogoi married UK-born Elizabeth Colebourn. In 2014, he joined the Congress Party and served as the Member of the Indian Parliament from Kaliabor (Assumed office 1 September 2014). He and his wife have 2 children—one son and one daughter (born 2016 and 2020).

Notable public figures related to Gogoi are poet Ganesh Gogoi (granduncle), film producer Paran Barbarooah (uncle), film director Prerana Barbarooah (cousin), and politician Dip Gogoi (uncle).

== Political career ==
After returning to India, Gogoi entered politics and expressed that he would be willing to perform in any role for the Indian National Congress. In March 2014, the Congress announced Gogoi as its candidate from Kaliabor Lok Sabha constituency. After the announcement, Gogoi filed his nomination for Kaliabor on 19 March 2014. He won the election against the Bharatiya Janata Party candidate, Mrinal Kumar Saikia, polling 443,315 votes and recording a winning margin of 93,000 votes.

Gogoi was re-elected from Kaliabor in 2019, defeating Asom Gana Parishad candidate, Moni Madhab Mahanta, polling 786,092 votes and recording a winning margin of 209,994 votes. In 2024, Gogoi contested from Jorhat, where he defeated the Bharatiya Janata Party candidate and incumbent, Topon Kumar Gogoi, polling 751,771 votes and recording a winning margin of 144,393 votes.

On 8 August 2023, Gogoi tabled the no-confidence motion for the I.N.D.I.A alliance against the Bharatiya Janata Party-led National Democratic Alliance government of Prime Minister Narendra Modi. Gogoi justified the no-confidence motion on the inaction and silence of the NDA government on the Manipur violence. The no-confidence motion failed to succeed, as it did not garner enough support from members in the Parliament.

On 26 May 2025, Gogoi was elected President of the Assam Pradesh Congress Committee.

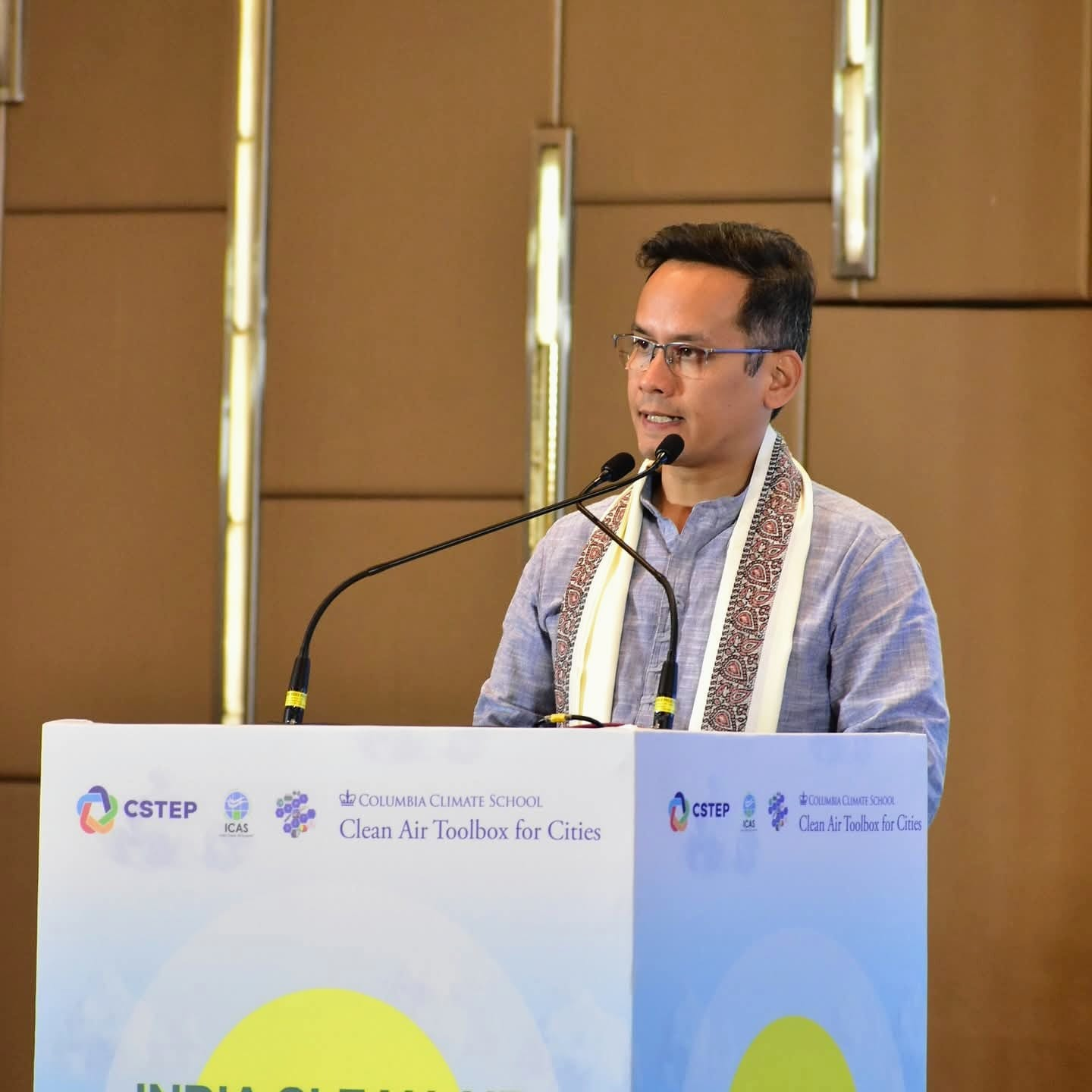
Gaurav Gogoi at the India Clean Air Summit ( ICAS) in Bengaluru in the year 2024

He led the party's campaign in the 2026 Assam Legislative Assembly election, where the Congress placed second and lost seats. Gogoi was defeated in Jorhat Assembly constituency polling 46,257 votes losing by over 23,000 votes to Hitendra Nath Goswami.

== Electoral Performance ==
Lok Sabha

Year	Constituency	Party	Votes	%	Opponent	Opponent Party	Opponent Votes	%	Margin	Margin in %	Result
2014	Kaliabor	INC	4,43,315	37.97%	Mrinal Kumar	BJP	3,49,441	29.93%	93,874	8.05%	Won
2019	Kaliabor	INC	7,86,092	55.18%	Moni Mahanta	AGP	5,76,098	40.44%	2,09,994	14.74%	Won
2024	Jorhat	INC	7,51,771	54.04%	Topon Kumar Gogoi	BJP	6,07,378	43.66%	1,44,393	10.38%	Won

=== Legislative Assembly ===
Assam Legislative Assembly
Year	Constituency	Party	Votes	%	Opponent	Party	Votes	%	Margin	%	Result
2026	Jorhat	INC	46,257	39.1	Hitendra Goswami	BJP	69,439	58.7	23,182	19.6	Lost
