= 1967 Assam Legislative Assembly election =

Indian state election

- 17 February 1967

All 126 seats to the Assam Legislative Assembly 52 seats needed for a majority
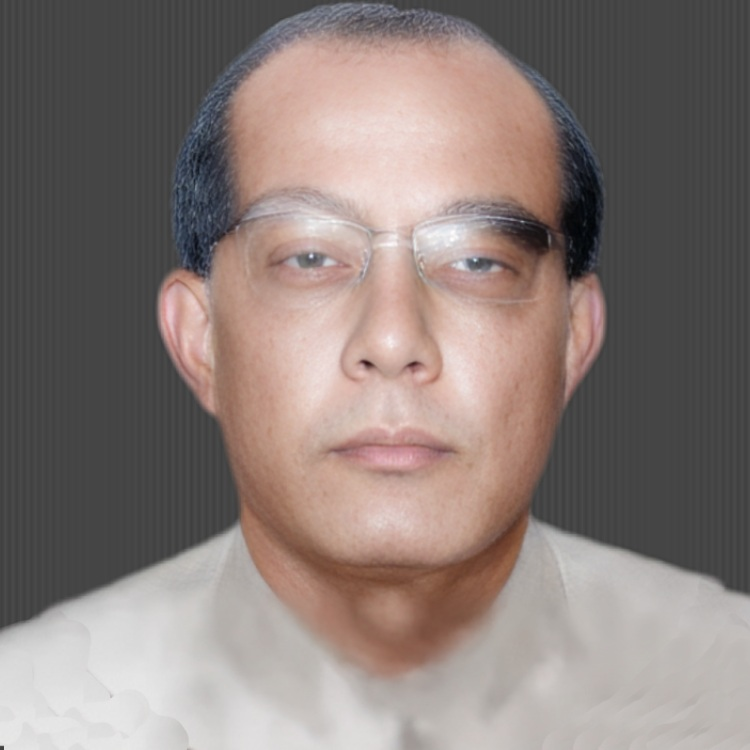
	First party	Second party
		APH
Leader	Bimala Prasad Chaliha	Williamson Sangma
Party	INC	APHLC
Leader's seat	Sonari	Baghmara
Seats before	79	11
Seats won	73	9
Seat change	▼6	▼2
Chief Minister before election
Bimala Prasad Chaliha
INC
Chief Minister
Bimala Prasad Chaliha
INC

Indian administrative divisions, as of 1951

The 4th Assam Legislative Assembly election was held in two phases in 1967 to elect members from 126 constituencies in Assam, India.

== Constituencies ==
Assam Legislative Assembly, 126 consisted of 93 General constituencies, 24 Scheduled Tribes and 9 Scheduled Castes constituencies. A total of 492 nominations were filed out of which 486 were men's and 6 were women withdrew their nominations. 4 women were elected to Assam Legislative Assembly.

== Political parties ==
9 National parties along with 10 registered unrecognized parties took part in the assembly election. Indian National Congress contested 92 seats and won 76 of them. Independent candidates won 14 seats while no other party cross double-digit.

== Results ==
Summary of results of the 1967 Assam Legislative Assembly election
Political Party	Flag	Seats Contested	Won	% of Seats	Votes	Vote %
Indian National Congress		120	73	44.66%	1354748	43.60%
All Party Hill Leaders Conference		12	9	57.86%	108447	3.49%
Communist Party of India		22	7	30.19%	108447	5.15%
Praja Socialist Party		35	5	23.20%	213094	6.86%
Samyukta Socialist Party		17	4	26.37%	101802	3.28%
Swatantra Party		13	2	14.07%	46187	1.49%
Independent		124	26	36.12%	1004695	32.33%
Total Seats		105	Voters	5449305	Turnout	3369230 (61.83%)

=== Constituency-wise results ===
#	Constituency	Leading Candidate	Leading Party	Margin	Remarks
1	Lungleh	No Nomination Filed			
2	Aijal East	A. Thanglura	Indian National Congress	Uncontested	
3	Aijal West	A. Thanglura	Indian National Congress	Uncontested	
4	Ratabari	Biswanath Upadhyay	Indian National Congress	11,959	
5	Patharkandi	Motilal Kanoo	Independent	2,372	
6	Karimganj North	Rathindra Nath Sen	Independent	2,298	
7	Karimganj South	Praffulla Choudhury	Indian National Congress	3,567	
8	Badarpur	Moulana Abdul Jalil Choudhury	Indian National Congress	2,777	
9	Hailakandi	Abdul Matlib Mazumdar	Indian National Congress	16,970	
10	Katlicherra	Tajamul Ali Laskar	Independent	5,819	
11	Silchar	Santosh Mohan Dev	Indian National Congress	3,173	
12	Sonai	Moinul Hoque Choudhury	Indian National Congress	11,268	
13	Dholai	Jatindra Mohan Barbhuyan	Independent	1,029	
14	Lakhipur	Mera Chouba Singha	Indian National Congress	6,062	
15	Udharbond	Jagannath Singha	Indian National Congress	16,750	
16	Barkhola	Altaf Hussain Mazumdar	Indian National Congress	7,310	
17	Katigora	AK Nurul Haque	Indian National Congress	7,916	
18	Haflong	Joy Bhadra Hagjer	Indian National Congress	4,627	
19	Bokajan	Sai Sai Terang	Indian National Congress	6,240	
20	Howraghat	Chatrasing Teron	Indian National Congress	7,605	
21	Baithalangso	Dhaniram Rongpi	Indian National Congress	7,639	
22	Jowai	Edwingson Barch	All Party Hill Leaders Conference	8,134	
23	Shillong	Hoover Hynniewta	All Party Hill Leaders Conference	5,528	
24	Nongpoh	B. B. Lyngdoh	All Party Hill Leaders Conference	Uncontested	
25	Nongstoin	Hopingstone Lyngdoh	All Party Hill Leaders Conference	17,687	
26	Cherrapunji	Stanley D.D. Nichols Roy	All Party Hill Leaders Conference	Uncontested	
27	Baghmara	Capt. Williamson A. Sangma	All Party Hill Leaders Conference	4,449	
28	Dainadubi	Mody Marak	All Party Hill Leaders Conference	5,952	
29	Tura	Grohonsing Marak	All Party Hill Leaders Conference	7,440	
30	Phulbari	Bronson Momin	All Party Hill Leaders Conference	3,694	
31	Mankachar	Zahirul Islam	Independent	3,694	
32	South Salmara	Bazlul Basit	Indian National Congress	1,496	
33	Dhubri	Syed Ahmed Ali	Indian National Congress	243	
34	Gauripur	Mohammad Azad Ali	Praja Socialist Party	2,269	
35	Golakganj	Kabir Chandra Roy Pradhani	Independent	11,433	
36	Bilasipara	Giasuddin Ahmed	Independent	9,097	
37	Gossaigaon	Mithius Tudu	Indian National Congress	11,152	
38	Kokrajhar West	Ranendra Basumatari	Indian National Congress	5,840	
39	Kokrajhar East	Rani Manjula Devi	Indian National Congress	6,686	
40	Sidli	Uttan Chandra Brahma	Indian National Congress	2,272	
41	Bijni	Golak Chandra Patgiri	Indian National Congress	5,103	
42	Abhayapuri	Kandarpa Narayan Banikya	Independent	10,808	
43	Bongaigaon	Mothura Mohan Sinha	Indian National Congress	3,455	
44	Goalpara West	Benoy Krishna Ghose	Praja Socialist Party	17,725	
45	Goalpara East	Shahadat Ali Jotdar	Independent	3,497	
46	Dudhnai	Sarat Chandra Rabha	Communist Party of India	4,003	
47	Sorbhog	Pranita Talukdar	Indian National Congress	8,834	
48	Bhabanipur	Dharanidhar Choudhury	Indian National Congress	4,287	
49	Patacharkuchi	Bhubaneswar Barman	Praja Socialist Party	4,561	
50	Barpeta	Dr. Surendra Nath Das	Praja Socialist Party	2,307	
51	Jania	Ataur Rahman	Indian National Congress	25,678	
52	Baghbar	Jalauddin Ahmed	Independent	1,766	
53	Sarukhetri	Matilal Nayak	Independent	9,356	
54	Chenga	Ataur Rahman	Indian National Congress	10,537	
55	Boko	Prabin Kumar Choudhury	Indian National Congress	8,243	
56	Chaygaon	Hareswar Goswami	Indian National Congress	6,385	
57	Palasbari	Abala Kanta Goswami	Independent	5,878	
58	Gauhati East	Mohendra Mohan Choudhury	Indian National Congress	7,721	
59	Gauhati West	Govinda Kalita	Communist Party of India	1,084	
60	Jalukbari	Sailen Medhi	Independent	5,417	
61	Hajo	Bishnuram Medhi	Indian National Congress	Uncontested	
62	Nalbari West	Dr. Bhumidhar Barman	Indian National Congress	1,028	
63	Nalbari East	Prabhat Narayan Choudhury	Indian National Congress	6,641	
64	Borbhag	Gourisankar Bhattacharyya	Independent	4,346	
65	Barama	Surendra Nath Das	Indian National Congress	1,046	
66	Tamulpur	Maneswar Boro	Independent	1,314	
67	Rangiya	Kamini Mohon Sarma	Communist Party of India	82	
68	Kamalpur	Lakshyadhar Chaudhury	Praja Socialist Party	274	
69	Panery	Hiralal Patwary	Independent	8,310	
70	Kalaigaon	Dandi Ram Dutta	Indian National Congress	172	
71	Rangamati	Nakul Chandra Das	Indian National Congress	7,648	
72	Mangaldai	Mohammad Matlibuddin	Independent	6,140	
73	Dalgaon	Surendra Chandra Baruah	Indian National Congress	1,697	
74	Udalguri	Bahadur Basumatary	Indian National Congress	7,460	
75	Dhekiajuli	Pushpalata Das	Indian National Congress	8,868	
76	Missamari	Mohi Kanta Das	Indian National Congress	6,880	
77	Tezpur	Bishnu Prasad Rava	Independent	373	
78	Balipara	Biswadev Sarma	Indian National Congress	11,519	
79	Sootea	Narayan Chandra Bhuyan	Indian National Congress	4,909	
80	Biswanath	Kamakhya Prasad Tripathi	Indian National Congress	7,253	
81	Gohpur	Bishnulal Upadhyaya	Indian National Congress	744	
82	Marigaon	Pitsing Konwar	Indian National Congress	7,240	
83	Bokani	Mohendra Nath Hazarika	Indian National Congress	9,487	
84	Laharighat	Mohammad Abul Kasem	Indian National Congress	13,170	
85	Raha	Sarat Chandra Goswami	Indian National Congress	2,138	
86	Dhing	Mohammad Samsul Huda	Indian National Congress	1,005	
87	Rupohihat	Musawir Chowdhury	Independent	2,173	
88	Nowgong	Phani Bora	Communist Party of India	5,153	
89	Darhampur	Kehoram Hazarika	Communist Party of India	3,292	
90	Kaliabor	Atul Chandra Goswami	Samyukta Socialist Party	3078	
91	Samaguri	Dev Kant Baruah	Indian National Congress	2971	
92	Jamunamukh	Lakshmi Prasad Goswami	Indian National Congress	6,846	
93	Hojai	Jonab Rahimuddin Ahmed	Swatantra Party	419	
94	Lumding	Sadhan Ranjan Sarkar	Indian National Congress	3734	
95	Bokakhat	Lakheswar Das	Indian National Congress	4506	
96	Sarupathar	C. G. Karmakar	Indian National Congress	6096	
97	Golaghat	Soneswar Bora	Indian National Congress	6379	
98	Dergaon	Narendra Nath Sarma	Indian National Congress	3149	
99	Majuli	Mohidhar Pegu	Indian National Congress	1964	
100	Jorhat	Jogen Saikia	Indian National Congress	672	
101	Charaibahit	Dulal Baruah	Indian National Congress	7340	
102	Titabar	Dulal Baruah	Indian National Congress	4776	
103	Mariani	Gojen Tanti	Indian National Congress	5457	
104	Teok	Tilok Gogoi	Indian National Congress	3374	
105	Amguri	Pushpadhar Chaliha	Indian National Congress	913	
106	Sibsagar	Promode Gogoi	Communist Party of India	3530	
107	Thowra	Durgeswar Saikia	Indian National Congress	2758	
108	Nazira	Karuna Kanta Gogoi	Indian National Congress	7380	
109	Mahmara	Ratneswar Konger	Indian National Congress	817	
110	Sonari	Bimala Prasad Chaliha	Indian National Congress	9786	
111	Bihpuria	Premadhar Bora	Independent	87	
112	Naoboicha	Dr. Bhupen Hazarika	Independent	5717	
113	North Lakhimpur	Govinda Chandra Bora	Indian National Congress	3140	
114	Dhakuakhana	Nameswar Pegu	Indian National Congress	6858	
115	Dhemaji	Ramesh Mohan Kouli	Swatantra Party	274	
116	Moran	Padma Kumari Gohain	Indian National Congress	5855	
117	Dibrugarh	Ramesh Chandra Brooah	Indian National Congress	2532	
118	Lahowal	Lily Sen Gupta	Indian National Congress	3110	
119	Tengakhat	Manik Chandra Das	Indian National Congress	789	
120	Tingkhong	Bhadreswar Gogoi	Samyukta Socialist Party	1992	
121	Joypur	Manik Chandra Das	Samyukta Socialist Party	3140	
122	Bogdung	Manik Chandra Das	Indian National Congress	2225	
123	Tinsukia	Manik Chandra Das	Indian National Congress	6568	
124	Digboi	Manik Chandra Das	Indian National Congress	2029	
125	Doom Dooma	Manik Chandra Das	Indian National Congress	12106	
126	Saikhowa	Manik Chandra Das	Indian National Congress	7259	

== See also ==
- 1967 elections in India
