= Sarat Saikia =

Indian politician (1948–2019)

Assam Legislative Assembly
- In office 2001–2016
- Preceded by: Hiranya Kumar Konwar
- Succeeded by: Jogen Mohan
- Constituency: Mahmora

Personal details
- Born: 11 March 1948
- Died: 1 August 2019 (aged 71) Kolkata, West Bengal, India
- Party: Bharatiya Janata Party
- Education: Dibrugarh University

Sarat Saikia (11 March 1948 – 1 August 2019) was an Indian politician belonging to Bharatiya Janata Party. He was thrice elected to the Assam Legislative Assembly from Mahmora.

== Early life and education ==
Saikia was born on 11 March 1948. His father's name was Durgeswar Saikia and his mother's name was Binaya Saikia. His father was a minister in the Assam Government. He graduated from Dibrugarh University in 1972.

== Political life ==
Saikia was elected as a member of the Assam Legislative Assembly in 2001 from Mahmora as an Indian National Congress candidate. He was elected again from Mahmora in 2006 and 2011. Later, he joined Bharatiya Janata Party.

== Personal life ==
Saikia was married to Sewali Saikia on 5 May 1974. The couple had two children.

== Death ==
Saikia died on 1 August 2019 at the age of 71.
