= Rajendranath Barua =

Indian politician

Member of Parliament, Lok Sabha
- In office 1962–1971
- Preceded by: Mofida Ahmed
- Succeeded by: Tarun Gogoi
- Constituency: Jorhat

Personal details
- Born: 1 July 1913 Jorhat, Assam, British India
- Died: 2006
- Party: Indian National Congress
- Other political affiliations: Praja Socialist Party

Rajendranath Barua (1913-2006) was an Indian politician. He was elected to the Lok Sabha, the lower house of the Parliament of India, from 1962 to 1971.
