= Demow Assembly constituency =

Assembly constituency of Assam

Demow
- Constituency No. 95 for the Assam Legislative Assembly

Constituency details
- Country: India
- Region: Northeast India
- State: Assam
- District: Sivasagar
- Lok Sabha constituency: Jorhat
- Established: 2023
- Total electors: 178,953
- Reservation: None

Member of Legislative Assembly
- 16th Assam Legislative Assembly
- Incumbent Sushanta Borgohain
- Party: Bharatiya Janata Party
- Elected year: 2026

Demow Assembly constituency is one of the 126 assembly constituencies of Assam a north east state of India. It was newly formed in 2023.

== Election Results ==
=== 2026 ===
2026 Assam Legislative Assembly election: Demow
Party	Candidate	Votes	%	±%
BJP	Sushanta Borgohain	89,681	59.74	
INC	Ajoy Kumar Gogoi	56153	37.4	
CPI	Ajoy Bora	2575	1.72	
NOTA	NOTA	1717	1.14	
Margin of victory		33528		
Turnout		150126		
Registered electors		178,953		
BJP win (new seat)				

== See also ==
- List of constituencies of Assam Legislative Assembly
