= Jorhat Lok Sabha constituency =

Lok Sabha constituency in Assam

Coordinates: 26.8°N 94.2°E

Jorhat AS-14
- Lok Sabha constituency
- Interactive Map Outlining Jorhat Lok Sabha constituency

Constituency details
- Country: India
- Region: Northeast India
- State: Assam
- Assembly constituencies: Jorhat; Titabar; Mariani; Teok; Majuli; Nazira; Mahmora; Sonari; Demow; Sibsagar
- Established: 1952
- Reservation: None

Member of Parliament
- 18th Lok Sabha
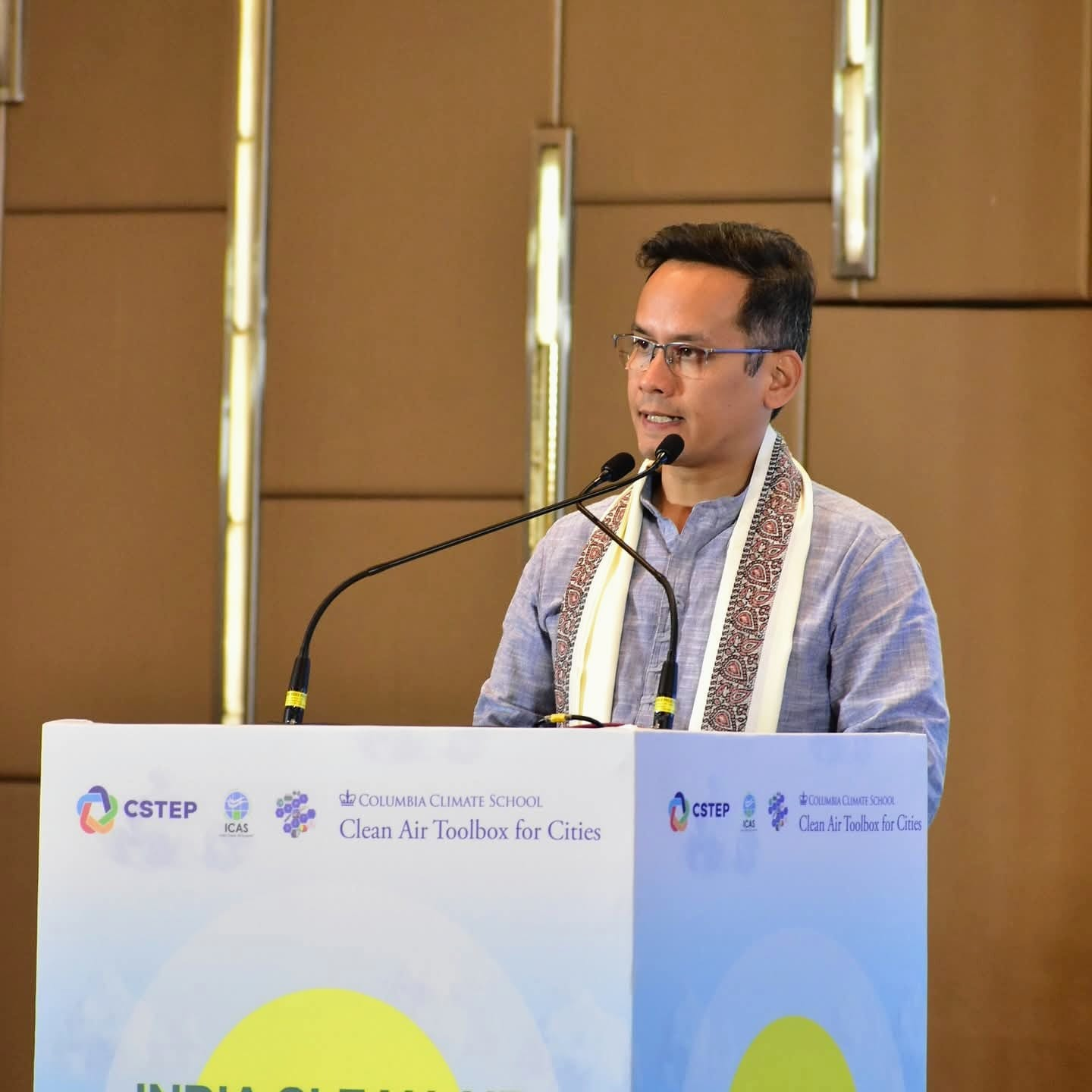
- Incumbent Gaurav Gogoi
- Party: INC
- Alliance: INDIA
- Elected year: 2024

Jorhat Lok Sabha constituency is one of the 14 Lok Sabha constituencies in Assam state in north-eastern India.

== Assembly segments ==
Jorhat Lok Sabha constituency is composed of the following assembly segments:

=== Current assembly segments ===
No.	Name	Reservation	District	Member	Party	2024 Lead
93	Sonari	None	Charaideo	Dharmeswar Konwar	BJP	INC
94	Mahmora	None	Charaideo	Suruj Dehingia	BJP	INC
95	Demow	None	Sibsagar	Sushanta Borgohain	BJP	INC
96	Sibsagar	None	Sibsagar	Akhil Gogoi	RD	INC
97	Nazira	None	Sibsagar	Mayur Borgohain	BJP	INC
98	Majuli	ST	Majuli	Bhuban Gam	BJP	BJP
99	Teok	None	Jorhat	Bikash Saikia	AGP	INC
100	Jorhat	None	Jorhat	Hitendra Nath Goswami	BJP	INC
101	Mariani	None	Jorhat	Rupjyoti Kurmi	BJP	INC
102	Titabar	None	Jorhat	Dhiraj Gowala	BJP	INC

=== Previous assembly segments ===
Constituency number	Name	Reserved for (SC/ST/None)	District
98	Jorhat	None	Jorhat
100	Titabar	None	Jorhat
101	Mariani	None	Jorhat
102	Teok	None	Jorhat
103	Amguri	None	Sibsagar
104	Nazira	None	Sibsagar
105	Mahmora	None	Charaideo
106	Sonari	None	Charaideo
107	Thowra	None	Sibsagar
108	Sibsagar	None	Sibsagar

== Members of Parliament ==
Year	Winner	Party
1952	Debeswar Sarmah	Indian National Congress
1957	Mofida Ahmed	Indian National Congress
1962	Rajendranath Barua	Praja Socialist Party
1967	Rajendranath Barua	Indian National Congress
1971	Tarun Gogoi	Indian National Congress
1977	Tarun Gogoi	Indian National Congress
1984	Parag Chaliha	Independent
1991	Bijoy Krishna Handique	Indian National Congress
1996	Bijoy Krishna Handique	Indian National Congress
1998	Bijoy Krishna Handique	Indian National Congress
1999	Bijoy Krishna Handique	Indian National Congress
2004	Bijoy Krishna Handique	Indian National Congress
2009	Bijoy Krishna Handique	Indian National Congress
2014	Kamakhya Prasad Tasa	Bharatiya Janata Party
2019	Topon Kumar Gogoi	Bharatiya Janata Party
2024	Gaurav Gogoi	Indian National Congress

== Election results ==
=== General election 2024 ===
2024 Indian general election: Jorhat
Party	Candidate	Votes	%	±%
INC	Gaurav Gogoi	7,51,771	54.04	▲10.50
BJP	Topon Kumar Gogoi	6,07,378	43.66	▼7.69
Ikkjutt Jammu	Arun Chandra Hadique	9,086	0.65	
Independent	Raj Kumar Duwara	8,370	0.60	
NOTA	None of the above	14,555	1.05	▼0.14
Majority		1,44,393	10.38	
Turnout		13,96,283	80.57	▲3.00
INC gain from BJP		Swing		

=== General election 2019 ===
2019 Indian general elections: Jorhat
Party	Candidate	Votes	%	±%
BJP	Topon Kumar Gogoi	5,43,288	51.35	+2.36
INC	Sushanta Borgohain	4,60,635	43.54	+5.54
CPI	Kanak Gogoi	17,849	1.69	
NOTA	None of the above	12,569	1.19	
AITC	Ribulaya Gogoi	6,121	0.58	N/A
Majority		82,653	7.81	
Turnout		10,58,820	77.57	
BJP hold		Swing		

=== General elections 2014 ===
2014 Indian general elections: Jorhat
Party	Candidate	Votes	%	±%
BJP	Kamakhya Prasad Tasa	4,56,420	48.99	+10.95
INC	Bijoy Krishna Handique	3,54,000	38.00	−9.46
AGP	Prodip Hazarika	46,626	5.01	+5.01
CPI	Drupad Borgohain	28,930	3.11	−6.61
AIUDF	Nasir Ahmed	7,331	0.79	+0.79
AITC	Ribulaya Gogoi	5,759	0.62	+0.62
SP	Gunin Basumatari	5,754	0.62	+0.62
Independent	Raj Kumar Dowarah	4,737	0.51	−0.25
AAP	Manorom Gogoi	3,659	0.39	+0.39
AIFB	Horen Borgohain	3,472	0.37	+0.37
NOTA	None of the above	14,648	1.57	−−−
Majority		1,02,420	11.00	+1.58
Turnout		9,31,568	78.32	
BJP gain from INC		Swing	+6.25	

=== General elections 2009 ===
2009 Indian general elections: Jorhat
Party	Candidate	Votes	%	±%
INC	Bijoy Krishna Handique	3,62,320	47.44	
BJP	Kamakhya Prasad Tasa	2,90,406	38.02	
CPI	Drupad Borgohain	74,185	9.71	
Majority		71,914	9.42	
Turnout		7,63,554	64.58	
INC hold		Swing		

== See also ==
- Jorhat district
- List of constituencies of the Lok Sabha
