= Ramesh Mohan Kouli =

Indian politician

Minister of Flood Control, Welfare of Plains Tribes and Backward Classes
- In office 21 March 1978 – 4 September 1979
- Chief Minister: Golap Borbora
- Succeeded by: Zahirul Islam

Member of Assam Legislative Assembly
- In office 1978–1983
- Preceded by: Constituency established
- Succeeded by: Puspadhar Pegu
- Constituency: Jonai
- In office 1967–1978
- Preceded by: Constituency established
- Succeeded by: Purna Chandra Bora
- Constituency: Dhemaji

Personal details
- Born: 21 July 1928
- Died: Unknown
- Party: Lokdal; Janata Party; Bharatiya Lok Dal; Swatantra Party
- Spouse: Padmawati Kouli (m. 1956)
- Children: 5
- Occupation: Politician

Ramesh Mohan Kouli (21 July 1928 – unknown) was an Indian politician and teacher from Assam who served as Minister of Flood Control from 1978 to 1979. He was the Member of Assam Legislative Assembly (MLA) for Dhemaji from 1967 to 1978 and for Jonai from 1978 to 1983.

== Early life and career ==
Kouli was born on 21 July 1928. He was general secretary of Dibrugarh HSK college from 1949 to 1950, and then headmaster of All Assam Miri High School from 1955 to 1956. Kouli was the founder teacher and headmaster of Dibrugarh Miching High School in 1962.

== Political career ==
Kouli was elected MLA for the Dhemaji in 1967 for the Swatantra Party, and was reelected in 1972. He was president of the Swatantra Party from 1966 to 1974, and then convenor and general secretary of the Bharatiya Lok Dal from 1974 to 1977. He joined the Janata Party in 1977, and was elected for the Jonai constituency in 1978. He was appointed Minister for Flood Control, Welfare of Plains Tribes, and Backward Classes under Golap Borbora in 1978.

Kouli later joined the Lokdal party and became president of Lok Dal (B) in Assam. In June 1988, the party merged with Congress (I), and Kouli met with Prime Minister Rajiv Gandhi, along with Kamala Bahuguna and Vijay Bahuguna as part of the merger.

== Family ==
Kouli married Padmawati Kouli in 1956, and they had three sons and two daughters together.
