= Parag Chaliha =

Indian politician

Member of Parliament Rajya Sabha
- In office 1995-1999
- Constituency: Assam

Member of Parliament Lok Sabha
- In office 1985-1989
- Preceded by: Tarun Gogoi
- Succeeded by: Bijoy Krishna Handique
- Constituency: Jorhat

Personal details
- Born: September 1923
- Died: November 10, 1999 (aged 76)
- Party: Asom Gana Parishad
- Spouse: Dipali Chaliha

Parag Chaliha (1923-1999) was an Indian politician. He was a Member of Parliament, representing Assam in the Rajya Sabha the upper house of India's Parliament representing the Asom Gana Parishad. He is the father of Kirip Chaliha who was a Member of Parliament, Lok Sabha from Guwahati.
