= Krishna Kanta Handique =

Sanskrit scholar, Indologist and philanthropist (1898–1982)

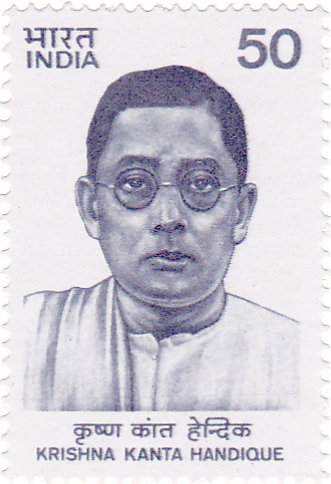
- Born: 20 July 1898; Jorhat, Assam, British India
- Died: 7 June 1982 (aged 83); Dibrugarh, Assam, India
- Education: Cotton College; Sanskrit College and University; Calcutta University; Oxford University; Paris University; Berlin University
- Occupations: Professor, Vice-Chancellor
- Spouse: Hemolata Gohain (m. 1928; died 1961)
- Children: Promila; Ahalya; Bijoy
- Relatives: Padmanath Gohain Baruah (uncle)
- Writing career
- Language: Assamese
- Notable awards: Padma Shri (1955); Padma Bhushan (1967); Sahitya Akademi Award (1985)

Krishna Kanta Handique (20 July 1898 – 7 June 1982) was a Sanskrit scholar, an Indologist, and a philanthropist from Assam. He was a recipient of the civilian honour of the Padma Shri and Padma Bhushan.

== Early life and education ==
Krishna Kanta Handique was born on 20 July 1898 in a Tai-Ahom family in Jorhat town of Assam, to Rai-Bahadur Radha Kanta Handique and Narayani Gohain Baruah. His mother was a sister of Padmanath Gohain Baruah. He was educated at Cotton College, Guwahati (1913–15), Sanskrit College, Calcutta (1915–17), Calcutta University (1917–19), Oxford University, Paris University and Berlin University (1920–27). He also studied and learned many languages like Latin, Greek, French, German, Russian, Italian and Spanish. He is known to have known 13 languages: 8 European languages and 5 Indian languages including Pali and Prakrit.

== Career ==
Handique was the founder Vice-Chancellor of Gauhati University for nine years (1948–57). Prior to this he was the founder Principal of J.B. College, Jorhat (1930–48) and established the Hemalata Handique Memorial Institute in Jorhat. He is well known for his munificence to literary and educational foundations. He bequeathed his massive personal library to Guwahati University making available to the public rare and valuable books in 11 languages of the world. He also gave the copyright of all his books to Deccan College PG & Research Institute, Pune; The Jaina Samskriti Samrakshaka Sangh, Maharashtra and Prakrit Test Society, Ahmedabad.

Krishna Kanta Handique was the President of Asam Sahitya Sabha during the Guwahati conference in 1937 at the young age of 39, President of Classical Sanskrit Section, XVI All India Oriental Conference, Lucknow in 1951 and was elected the general President of the Srinagar Session of the same in 1961.

== Personal life ==
After his return from Europe in 1927, Handique married Hemolata Gohain in February 1928, the daughter of Uma Charan Gohain of Nowgong. They remained married until her death on 20 July 1961. Together they had two daughters, Promila and Ahalya, and one son, Bijoy Krishna. Promila was married to Damburudhar Gogoi, while Ahalya married Buddindra Nath Gogoi.

== Legacy ==
The Indian Posts and Telegraphs Dept. issued a commemorative stamp in honor of Handique on 7 October 1983. The Govt of Assam has instituted the prestigious Krishna Kanta Handique Memorial Award in his honour in the field of promotion of Sanskrit language and literature.

Handique was posthumously awarded the Sahitya Akademi Award in 1985 for his book Krishnakanta Handiqui Rachana Sambhar, a collection of 20 critical essays. For its critical insight and analytical approach, the work has been regarded as a significant contribution to contemporary Assamese literature.

== Works ==
Handique, the Sanskrit scholar is known for his three major works:

- Naisadhacarita of Sriharsa, 1934
- Yaśastilaka and Indian Culture 1949 (on Yashastilaka)
- Pravarasena's Setubandha 1976
