= Rana Goswami =

Indian politician

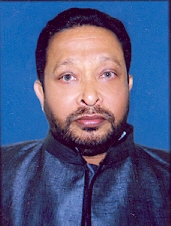
- Rana Goswami

Vice President of Bharatiya Janata Party - Assam 2024- 2025
- Incumbent
- Assumed office 2024

Working President of Assam Pradesh Congress Committee
- In office 24 July 2021 – 28 February 2024

Assam Legislative Assembly
- In office 2006–2016
- Preceded by: Hitendra Nath Goswami
- Succeeded by: Hitendra Nath Goswami
- Constituency: Jorhat

Personal details
- Born: 12 November 1959 (age 66) Jorhat, Assam
- Party: Bharatiya Janata Party (2024- )
- Other political affiliations: Indian National Congress
- Spouse: Jyoti Rekha Goswami
- Education: B.Com.
- Occupation: Politician

Rana Goswami (born 12 November 1959) is an Indian politician of Bharatiya Janata Party (BJP) from Assam. He is the chairman of Assam Urban Water Supply and sewerage Board and serving as Vice President of BJP Assam unit. He was the Working President of Assam Pradesh Congress Committee until February 28, 2024. He joined the BJP in the presence of Chief Minister of Assam Himanta Biswa Sarma and BJP State President Bhabesh Kalita in Guwahati on February 29, 2024.

== Political career ==
He has been elected twice to the Assam Legislative Assembly from Jorhat constituency in 2006 and 2011 elections. On 24 July 2021, he was appointed Working President of Assam Pradesh Congress Committee.
