= Mahmora Assembly constituency =

Constituency of the Assam legislative assembly in India

Mahmora
- Constituency No. 94 for the Assam Legislative Assembly

Constituency details
- Country: India
- Region: Northeast India
- State: Assam
- District: Charaideo
- Lok Sabha constituency: Jorhat
- Established: 1967
- Reservation: None

Member of Legislative Assembly
- 16th Assam Legislative Assembly
- Incumbent Suruj Dehingia
- Party: Bharatiya Janata Party
- Elected year: 2026

Mahmora Assembly constituency (formerly known as Mahmara) is one of the 126 assembly constituencies of Assam Legislative Assembly. Mahmora forms part of the Jorhat Lok Sabha constituency.

== Members of Legislative Assembly ==
Year	Name	Party
1967	R. Konwar	Indian National Congress
1972	Khagen Gogoi	Indian National Congress
1978	Budha Barua	Revolutionary Communist Party of India
1983	Narad Kamar	Indian National Congress
1985	Chandra Arandhara	Independent
1991	Lakhi Prasad Borgohain	Indian National Congress
1996	Hiranya Kumar Konwar	Asom Gana Parishad
2001	Sarat Saikia	Indian National Congress
2006	Sarat Saikia	Indian National Congress
2011	Sarat Saikia	Indian National Congress
2016	Jogen Mohan	Bharatiya Janata Party
2021	Jogen Mohan	Bharatiya Janata Party
2026	Suruj Dehingia	Bharatiya Janata Party

== Election results ==
=== 2026 ===
2026 Assam Legislative Assembly election: Mahmora
Party	Candidate	Votes	%	±%
NDA	Suruj Dehingia	69530	55.2	
INDIA	Jnyandip Mohan	53509	42.48	
NOTA	NOTA	2915	2.31	
Margin of victory		16021		
Turnout		125954		
Rejected ballots				
Registered electors				
BJP hold		Swing		

=== 2016 ===
2016 Assam Legislative Assembly election: Mahmara
Party	Candidate	Votes	%	±%
BJP	Jogen Mohan	49,036	47.50	
INC	Suruj Dehingia	34,711	33.62	
AGP	Hiranya Konwar	9,316	9.02	
Independent	Hemen Pegu	2,194	2.12	
BVM	Baldev Teli	1,178	1.14	
Independent	Prasun Rajkonwar	1,140	1.10	
JCP	Sunit Mahanta	872	0.84	
NCP	Rajen Gogoi	812	0.78	
LDP	Kali Boruah	744	0.72	
Independent	Dibya Buragohain Gogoi	731	0.70	
RCPI(RB)	Nityananda Gogoi	448	0.43	
RJP	Girish Phukan	251	0.24	
NOTA	None of the above	1,795	1.73	
Majority		14,325	13.87	
Turnout		1,03,228	85.94	
Registered electors		1,20,107		
BJP gain from INC		Swing		
