= Hareswar Goswami =

Indian politician (1918–1968)

Speaker of the Assam Legislative Assembly
- In office 20 March 1967 – 10 May 1968
- Deputy: M. K. Das
- Preceded by: Mahendra Mohan Choudhry
- Succeeded by: Mohi Kanta Das

Leader of the Opposition Assam Legislative Assembly
- In office 1952–1962
- Chief Minister: Bishnuram Medhi; Bimala Prasad Chaliha
Assembly positions
Member of Assam Legislative Assembly
In office 1967 – 10 May 1968
Preceded by	Harendra Nath Talukdar
Succeeded by	Satyavati Goswami
Constituency	Rampur
In office 1957–1962
Preceded by	Constituency established
Succeeded by	Harendra Nath Talukdar
Constituency	Rampur
In office 1952–1957
Preceded by	Constituency established
Succeeded by	Radhika Ram Das
Constituency	Palasbari

Personal details
- Born: 7 February 1918 Guwahati, Assam Province, British India
- Died: 10 May 1968 (aged 50) Guwahati, Assam, India
- Party: Indian National Congress
- Spouse: Satyavati Goswami (m. 1946)
- Children: 4
- Education: Cotton College; St Catharine's College, Cambridge

Hareswar Goswami (7 February 1918 – 10 May 1968) was an Indian politician and lawyer who served as Leader of the Opposition of Assam Legislative Assembly from 1952 to 1962 and as speaker from 1967 until his death in 1968.

== Early life, education and career ==
Goswami was born on 7 February 1918 in Guwahati, the son of Kumudeswar Goswami. He was educated at Cotton College and St Catharine's College, Cambridge. He was called to the bar on 26 January 1940 and joined the Calcutta High Court in 1941. Goswami joined the individual Satyagraha in 1940 and was arrested twice in connection with the movement. He also participated in the 1942 Quit India movement and was detained as a security prisoner from September 1942 until he was released on health grounds in 1944.

== Political career ==
Goswami joined the Indian National Congress (INC) in 1940 until he left to form the Socialist Party, and later the Praja Socialist Party. He rejoined Congress in 1964. He served as Leader of the Opposition of Assam Legislative Assembly from 1952 to 1962, and became speaker in 1967.

== Personal life ==
Goswami was married to Satyavati Goswami and they had two sons and two daughters together. Satyavati went on to become MLA of Rampur in 1972.

== Death and funeral ==
Goswami died of a heart attack at his residence in Silphukuri, Guwahati on 10 May 1968, aged 50.
