= Debeswar Sarmah =

Indian politician

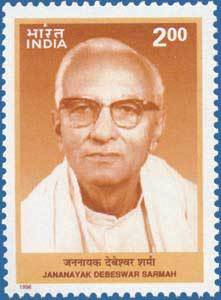
- Indian Postage depicting Debeswar Sarmah, 1996

Member of Parliament, Lok Sabha
- In office 1952–1957
- Succeeded by: Mofida Ahmed
- Constituency: Jorhat

Personal details
- Born: 10 October 1896 Jorhat, Assam, British India
- Died: 1 August 1993 (aged 95–96)
- Party: Indian National Congress
- Spouse: Nirmolmayee Devi

Debeswar Sarmah (10 October 1896 – 1 August 1993) was an Indian politician. He was elected to the Lok Sabha, the lower house of the Parliament of India, as a member of the Indian National Congress.Sarmah had been a personage no to be forgotten from the days of India's struggle for independence. He played a pivotal role in the developmental activities of the state. In one of the most important activity during the early post-independent era of India, he shouldered the responsibility of bringing many educational institute to Assam in general, and Jorhat in particular. One of them is CSIR- Regional Research Laboratories, now known as NEIST (North East Institute of Science and Technology). Sarmah died on 1 August 1993.
