= Bijoy Krishna Handique =

Indian politician (1934–2015)

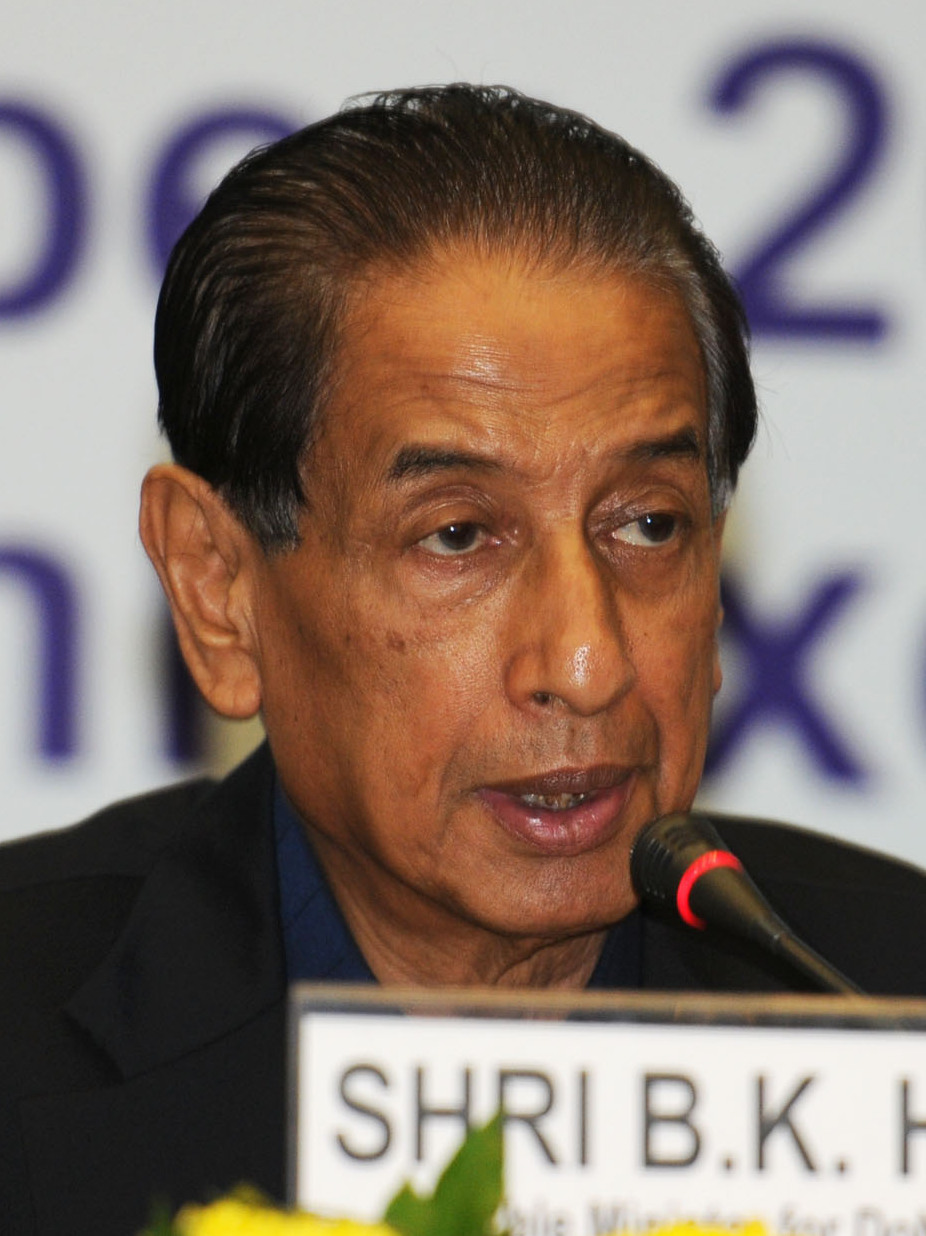
- Handique in September 2010

Union Minister of Development of North Eastern Region
- In office 28 May 2009 – 12 July 2011
- Prime Minister: Manmohan Singh
- Preceded by: Mani Shankar Aiyar
- Succeeded by: Paban Singh Ghatowar

Union Minister of Mines
- In office 28 May 2009 – 19 January 2011
- Prime Minister: Manmohan Singh
- Preceded by: Sis Ram Ola
- Succeeded by: Dinsha Patel
Junior ministerial offices
Union Minister of State for Mines
In office 6 April 2008 – 22 May 2009
Prime Minister	Manmohan Singh
Minister	Sis Ram Ola
Preceded by	T. Subbarami Reddy
Union Minister of State for Chemicals and Fertilizers
In office 29 January 2006 – 22 May 2009
Prime Minister	Manmohan Singh
Minister	Ram Vilas Paswan
Succeeded by	Srikant Kumar Jena
Union Minister of State for Parliamentary Affairs
In office 23 May 2004 – 6 April 2008 Serving with Suresh Pachouri and Suryakanta Patil
Prime Minister	Manmohan Singh
Minister	Ghulam Nabi Azad; Priya Ranjan Dasmunsi
Succeeded by	V. Narayanasamy
Union Minister of State for Defence
In office 23 April 2004 – 29 January 2006
Prime Minister	Manmohan Singh
Minister	Pranab Mukherjee
Succeeded by	Rao Inderjit Singh
Parliamentary offices
Member of Parliament, Lok Sabha
In office 20 June 1991 – 18 May 2014
Preceded by	Parag Chaliha
Succeeded by	Kamakhya Prasad Tasa
Constituency	Jorhat
Member of Parliament, Rajya Sabha
In office 3 April 1980 – 2 April 1986
Constituency	Assam
Assembly position
Member of Assam Legislative Assembly
In office 1972–1978
Preceded by	Jogen Saikia
Succeeded by	Dulal Baruah
Constituency	Jorhat

Personal details
- Born: 1 December 1934 Jorhat, Assam Province, British India
- Died: 26 July 2015 (aged 80) Jorhat, Assam, India
- Party: Indian National Congress
- Spouse: Swarup Rani Borgohain (m. 1965)
- Children: 3
- Parents: Krishna Kanta Handique (father); Hemolata Gohain (mother)
- Relatives: Padmanath Gohain Baruah (great-uncle)
- Education: Jorhat Govt. Boys' H.S and M.P. School; Presidency College, Calcutta

Bijoy Krishna Handique (1 December 1934 – 26 July 2015) was an Indian statesman, author and social worker who served as Union Minister of Development of North Eastern Region and Union Minister of Mines from 2009 to 2011. He previously held various junior ministerial positions in the union government from 2004 to 2009. A member of the Indian National Congress (INC), Handique was a Member of the Rajya Sabha from 1980 to 1986, and a six-term Member of the Lok Sabha for Jorhat from 1991 to 2014. He represented Jorhat in Assam Legislative Assembly from 1972 to 1978.

Born in Jorhat, Handique was the son of scholar and Indologist, Krishna Kanta Handique, and great-nephew of poet and writer Padmanath Gohain Baruah. He was educated at Jorhat Govt. Boys' H.S and M.P. School and later studied at Presidency College, Calcutta. Handique became involved in Congress politics during his schooling years and joined the Youth Congress in 1961. He was elected to Assam Legislative Assembly for the Jorhat constituency at the 1972 election, defeating the incumbent MLA. The following year, he became a member of the All India Congress Committee (AICC), before leaving the state legislature at the 1978 election. In 1980, he became a member of the Rajya Sabha, representing Assam until 1986. In the Rajya Sabha, Handique served on various committees, including on the committee for Scheduled Castes and Scheduled Tribes from 1982 to 1984. He was the vice president of Assam Pradesh Congress Committee (APCC) between 1980 and 1990.

After an unsuccessful candidacy in the 1984 election, Handique was elected to the 10th Lok Sabha for Jorhat in 1991. He was reelected in both the 1996 and 1998 elections. After his reelection in the 1999 general election, Handique was a member of the Lok Sabha Rules Committee from 1999 to 2004. After Congress returned to government in the 2004 election, Handique served in the First Manmohan Singh ministry as Union Minister of State for Defence from April 2004 to January 2006, and Union Minister of State for Parliamentary Affairs May 2004 to April 2008. He continued to serve under Manmohan Singh as Union Minister of State for Chemicals & Fertilizers from January 2006 to May 2009 and as Union Minister of State for Mines from April 2008 to May 2009. After the 2009 general election, Handique was promoted to cabinet as Union Minister of Mines and the Development of North Eastern Region (DoNER) in May 2009.

Handique was removed from his position as Union Minister of Mines in January 2011 by Singh but retained his DoNER ministerial portfolio. He left the council of ministers in a July 2011 reshuffle, and later became chairman of the parliamentary Standing Committee for Welfare of Other Backward Classes. He continued to serve in the Lok Sabha until he lost his seat to the Bharatiya Janata Party (BJP) at the 2014 election. Handique died the following year at the age of 80 and was cremated with full state honours.

== Early life and education (1934–1962) ==
=== Birth and family background ===
Bijoy Krishna Handique was born on 1 December 1934, in Jorhat, as the only son of Krishna Kanta Handique and Hemolata Gohain. He had two sisters, Promila and Ohoilia. His father was a maternal nephew of Padmanath Gohain Baruah.

=== Education and early political involvement ===
Handique studied English literature at Presidency College, Calcutta (now Kolkata). He went on to complete M.A. in English from the University of Calcutta. He attended Jorhat Govt. Boys' H.S and M.P. School in his formative years.

In Class VII, he joined the local Students' Congress, during India's freedom movement. There, he mobilised other students in a 'Vote for Congress' campaign, before the Assam provincial elections of 1945. He organised literary circles for talks around freedom. This was much against the wishes of his father, who then wanted him to pursue a career in academics.

Handique became a member of Youth Congress formally in 1961.

=== School establishment (1960s) ===
In the early 1960s, Handique became concerned about the lack of an English medium school in the vast Upper Assam area. This led him to eventually establish the Hemlata Handiqui Memorial Institute [HHMI], the first English medium school in Upper Assam, in 1962. This eventually developed HHMI, which encouraged students to take up subjects as diverse as workshops on music and Shakespeare.

The task was had difficulties, although land for the school was purchased by Handique's family. Within months of the school starting its first classes, the Indo-China war of 1962 broke out. This created panic in Jorhat, and many teachers and students fled from the town. He assisted the Red Cross in their efforts at training and organisation. Handique donated his mother's jewellery to the war effort.

"Many people fled following the Chinese aggression and the fall of Tawang and Bomdila in the northeastern sector. There was great panic. Our first principal, J S Walters, went missing. He left without notice, taking only his bicycle with him. Due to fears of a full scale war, the school was closed for a month."

In 2012, the school celebrated its 50th anniversary. Handique composed a song for the occasion, set to tune by a former student.

== Political career ==
=== Assam assembly (1972–1978) ===
Handique was elected to the Assam Legislative Assembly for the Jorhat constituency at the 1972 election. He won 15,175 votes with a total of 53.55% of the vote. He defeated the incumbent MLA, Jogen Saikia, with a majority of 5130 votes.

Handique became a member of the All India Congress Committee (AICC) in 1973. During his tenure as an MLA, he held various positions between 1974 and 1977 including Chairman of Estates Committee and as a member of the Committee on government assurances. From 1973 to 1978, he was also president of the Jorhat district Congress Committee.

Handique left the Assam assembly at the 1978 election.

=== Rajya Sabha and state party positions (1980–1990) ===
Handique became a member of the Rajya Sabha in 1980, representing the state of Assam. During his tenure, he was a member of:

- Consultative Committee, Ministry of Education & Sports Affairs (1980–90)
- Committee of Privileges (1984–85)
- Committee on Welfare of Scheduled Castes and Scheduled Tribes (1982–84)

Handique was the vice president of Assam Pradesh Congress Committee (APCC) from 1980 to 1990. He stood unsuccessfully for the Jorhat Lok Sabha constituency at the 1984 elections as the Congress candidate, but finished in second place behind independent candidate Parag Chaliha. Handique won 189,787 votes, but lost to Chaliha by 98,753 votes.

=== 10th Lok Sabha (1991–1996) ===
At the 1991 general election, Handique stood again for the Jorhat Lok Sabha constituency and won 239,369 votes (44.9% of the total vote); he was elected for the constituency with a majority of 110,663 votes, defeating Chaliha who finished in second place.

Handique was a member of:

- Committee on Industry (1991-1996)
- Committee on Food & Supplies (1991-1996)
- Committee on Official Language (1991-1996)
- Consultative Committee, Ministry of Petroleum (1991-1996)

=== 11th and 12th Lok Sabha (1996–1999) ===
At the 1996 election, Handique was reelected after receiving 311,578 votes (47.99%), with a majority of 47,239 votes.

Handique was a member of:

- Committee on Industry (1998-1999)
- Consultative Committee, Ministry of External Affairs (1997-1999)
- Chairman, Railway Convention Committee, (1998-1999)

Handique was reelected at the 1998 election, having won 216,406 votes (65.13%). He obtained an increased majority of 162,009 votes.

==== Position on AFSPA: The Armed Forces (Special Powers) Act, 1958 ====
Handique was critical of the controversial Armed Forces (Special Powers) Act (AFSPA) and gave his views on the floor of Parliament. The Act gives the Indian Army immunity to arrest without warrant on suspicion, shoot and kill any citizen in areas deemed disturbed by the government, without any recourse to scrutiny. AFPSA is currently implemented in certain parts of Northeast India and Kashmir.

In July 1998, at the Lok Sabha debates, he stated, "The Armed Forces operating in the insurgency-prone Northeast, was never examined to assess that this could degenerate into a Draconian piece of legislation… an Army officer armed with such power to kill, an immunity under the Act, is naturally instigated to invoke such powers right from the word 'go' in a confrontation... If fighting terrorism is a state of mind, then causing deaths, while tackling the terrorists, is also likely to be registered on an Army personnel's state of mind. So it's full of paradox. Government deploys the Army to fight the terrorists for the protection of its citizens, but it's the common men and women who are caught in the crossfire and suffer the most... I understand the feelings where brutal operations were conducted under the Armed Forces Act. It's true that the scars on the soul cannot be bartered away with economic packages".

=== 13th Lok Sabha (1999–2004) ===
At the 1999 general election, Handique was reelected with 304,690 votes (48.31%). He received a majority of 99,360 votes.

Handique was a member of:

- Lok Sabha Rules Committee (1999-2004)
- Consultative Committee, Ministry of External Affairs (1999-2004)
- Committee on Petroleum and Chemicals (1999-2000)

In 2002, Handique became a member of the Congress Working Committee.

=== 14th Lok Sabha and Minister of State (2004–2009) ===
At the 2004 election, Handique won 223,624 votes, defeating his nearest opponent by 51,292 votes.

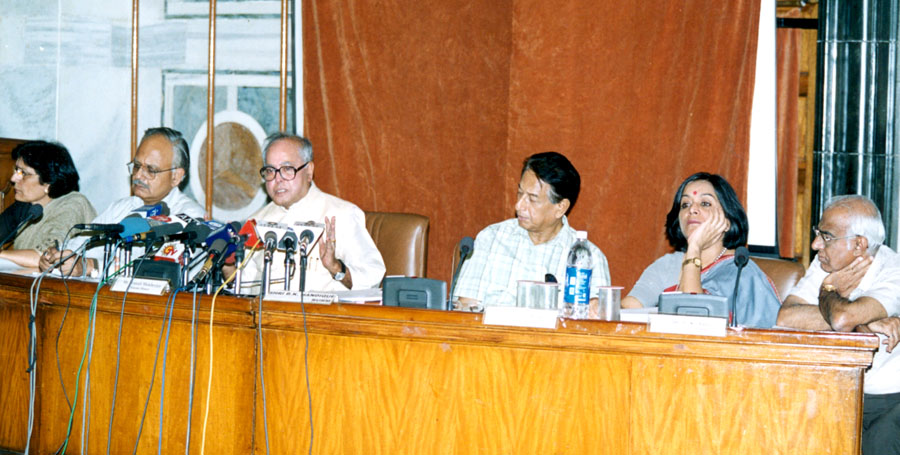
Handique with Defence Minister Pranab Mukherjee, July 2004

Handique held the following positions in the 14th Lok Sabha:

- Union Minister of State, Chemicals & Fertilizers, 2006 –2009
- Union Minister of State, Parliamentary Affairs, 2004-2007
- Union Minister of State, Defence, 2004 –2006

Before he took ministerial responsibilities in 2004, Handique frequently spoke on Parliamentary processes and procedures to Central government probationary officers including Indian Administrative Services (IAS) officers. These lectures were organised by the Bureau of Parliamentary Studies and Training.

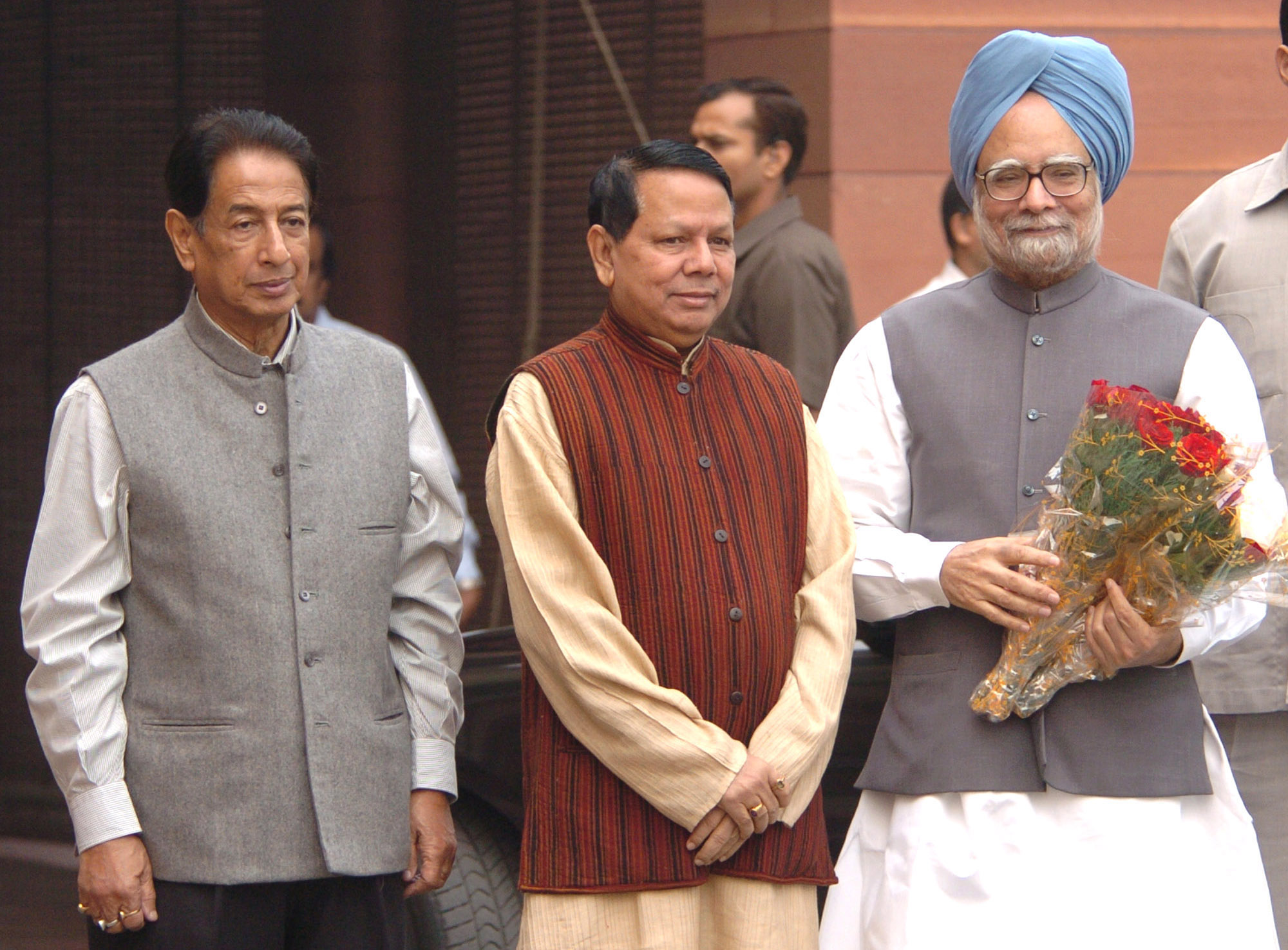
Handique with Minister Priya Ranjan Dasmunsi and Prime Minister Manmohan Singh, November 2007

As Minister of State and Cabinet Minister for seven years in the 14th and part of 15th Lok Sabha (between June 2004 and July 2011), Handique participated in debates on behalf of the government. Only starred questions and replies have been included in the three volumes for economy of space. Under Parliamentary proceedings, ministers do not ask questions, but reply to questions of Members. They also do not introduce private member bills.

His tenure included debates on Assam Appropriation Bill, Assam State legislature (Delegation of Powers) Bill, 1981, Floods in Assam, Chaparmukh-Silghat Railway line Bill, Illegal Migrants (Determination by Tribunals) Bill, Tea (Amendment) Bill, Gangtok Municipal Corporation (Amendment) Bill, among others.

Bills of national importance also included Wildlife (Protection) Amendment Bill, The Representation of the People (Amendment) Bill, 1985, Handloom Bill, The Copyrights (Amendment) Bill, National Health Policy, General Budgets and Finance Bills, among others.

Handique wrote in his foreword to A Life in Parliament: "Scope of a Minister as a Parliamentarian, is of course different from that of a Member of Parliament. How I speak as an M.P. from the Treasury Benches, as a Member in Opposition and as a member of the Council of Ministers follow conventionally different patterns".

=== 15th Lok Sabha and Cabinet Minister (2009–2014) ===
Handique was reelected at the 2009 general election, Handique won 362,320 votes (30.64% of the total vote). He won an increased majority of 71,914 votes.

==== Minister of Mines (2009–2011) ====
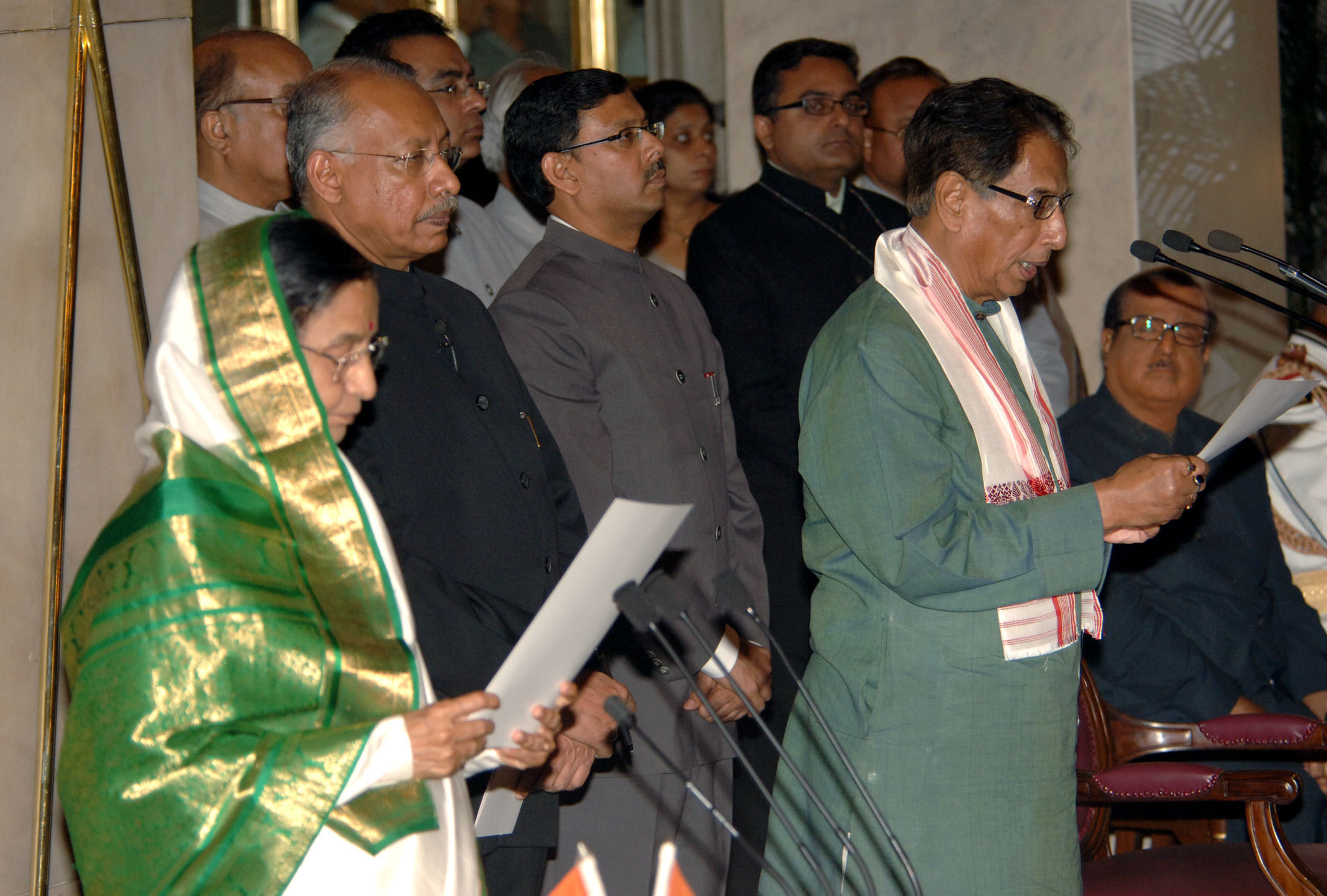
President Pratibha Patil administering the oath of office to Handique, May 2009

After his election to the 15th Lok Sabha elections, Handique was promoted to Union Cabinet minister status. He formally took the oath of office as Union Cabinet Minister holding dual charges of Mines and the Development of North East Region (DoNER) portfolios, and took office on 28 May 2011.

During his tenure as Union Cabinet Minister of Mines,a new direction was given to the Nation's Mining Policy with the clause for participation and inclusion of local communities in mining belts including tribal areas. The Draft mining bill initiated by Handique was due for introduction in the Indian Parliament.

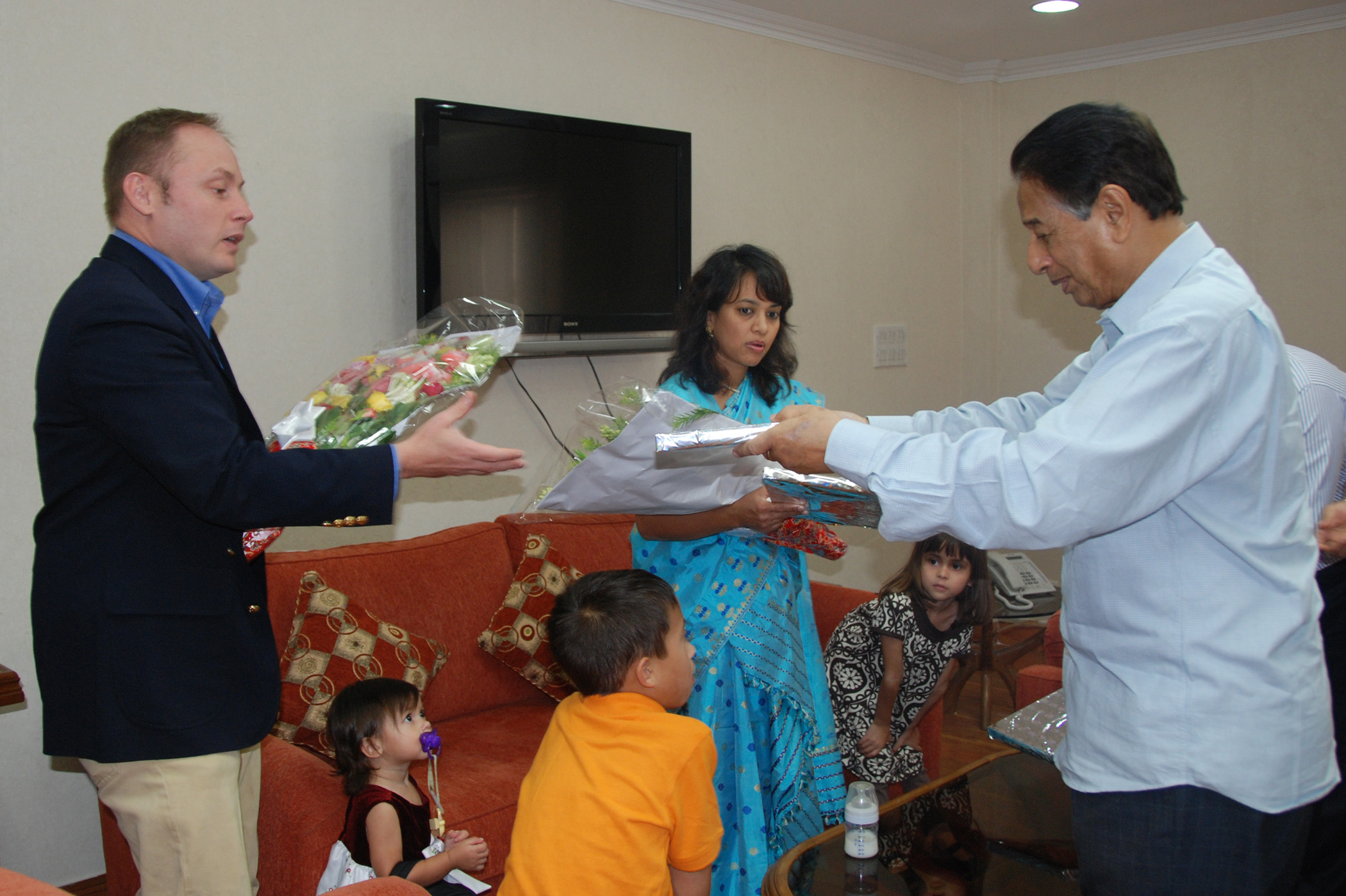
Handique with NASA astronaut Michael Fincke, September 2009

Handique proposed that 26% of equity or profits from the mining operations of a company should go to the people directly affected by the mining operations. He proposed that this was the only way to give the local tribal populations in mining areas a stake in their operations.

Handique proposed to make locals –project affected people [PAP]- the stakeholders in the project, and thus remove major impediment in expansion of old or development of new mines.

Also during his tenure, Handique came under pressure to sell off the government's stakes in profitable mining companies like Coal India Ltd and Hindustan Copper Ltd, to private players. Despite that, he reasoned that since it was difficult to value these companies and because the benefits of privatisation were not obvious, the government would not sell its stake. He also blocked the privatisation-by-stealth strategy of mining companies like Vedanta Resources.

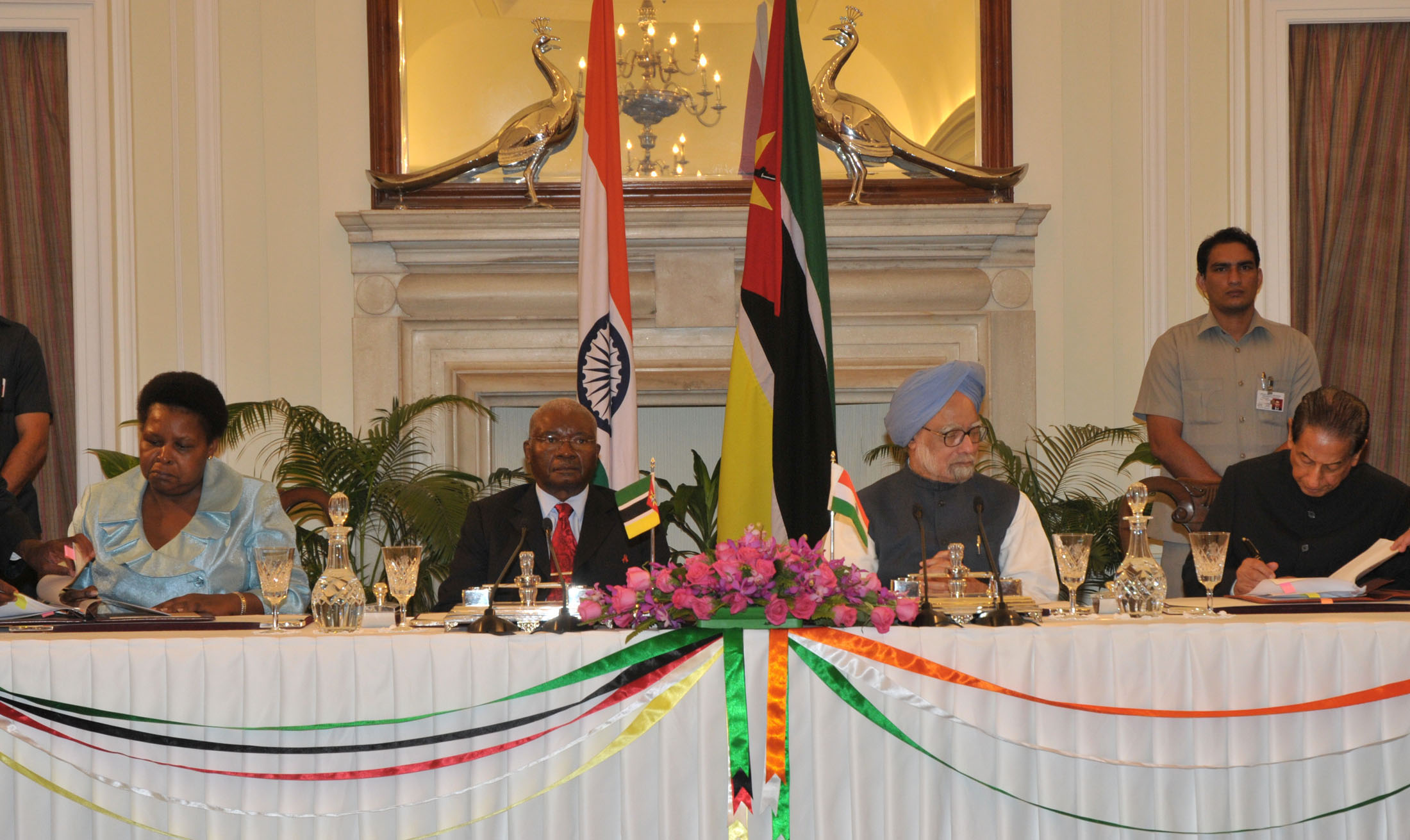
Handique signing an agreement with president of Mozambique Armando Guebuza and Manmohan Singh, 2010

Handique proposed a windfall tax on ore exported to raise resources for the people adversely affected by projects.

Despite his proposal for a windfall tax, Handique was not in favour of banning mining activities in any state. He requested chief ministers of all mining states to cooperate with the government's efforts to clean up mining and ensure proper revenue collection.

On 19 January 2011, he was removed from his position as Mines minister and replaced by Dinsha Patel. However, he was retained in the Council of Ministers as DoNER minister.

==== Minister of Development of the North Eastern Region (2009–2011) ====
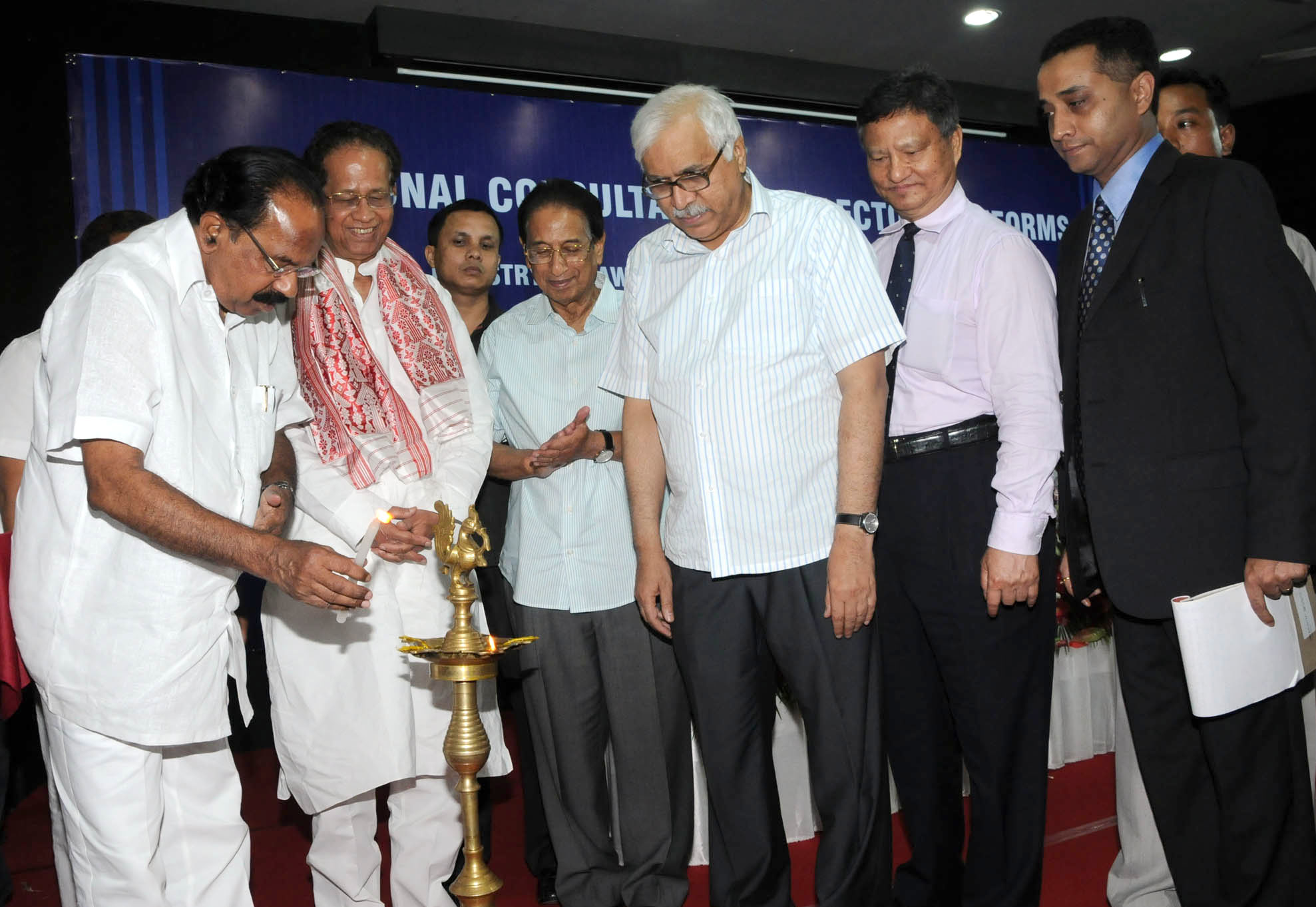
Handique with Chief Minister Tarun Gogoi and Minister Veerappa Moily, 2010

During his tenure as Minister of Development of North Eastern Region, he initiated policy changes regarding connectivity, promotion of youth and industry in the Region. Integration of the Region to the Mainstream was his major focus as the Minister of DoNER.

On 12 July 2011, in a cabinet reshuffle, Handique was dismissed from his ministerial position by Prime Minister Manmohan Singh along with six other minsters, and replaced by Paban Singh Ghatowar.

==== Post-ministerial career (2011–2014) ====
After leaving his ministerial position, Handique was appointed chairman of the newly constituted parliamentary Standing Committee for Welfare of Other Backward Classes.

After 2012, he was a member of the Indian National Congress' Central Election Committee. The 14-member panel, chaired by Congress president Sonia Gandhi, is entrusted with the task of selecting party candidates for state and national elections. On 3 May 2013, he became a member of the Committee on Welfare of Other Backward Classes (OBCs).

After serving six terms in the Lok Sabha, Handique was defeated in the 2014 elections by the Bharatiya Janata Party (BJP) candidate Kamakhya Prasad Tasa. He won 354,000 votes (29.76%), but lost to Tasa by 102,420 votes.

== Personal life ==
Handique married Swarup Rani Borgohain on 22 January 1965. He had three married daughters and two grandchildren. In retirement, he was an occasional poet and environmentalist, having interests in wildlife and conservation.

== Death and funeral ==
On 25 July 2015, Handique was admitted to Jorhat Medical College due to heart-related and respiratory ailments. In the afternoon of the same day, he was admitted to the ICU. On 26 July 2015, Handique died of a cardiact arrest, aged 80 at around 12:30 PM.

Many political figures paid tribute to him, including Sonia Gandhi, Rahul Gandhi, Pranab Mukherjee, Tarun Gogoi, Sarat Barkotoky, Anjan Dutta, Ajanta Neog and many others. Sonia Gandhi said of Handique "he was a valued member of the previous UPA governments and the void created by his death will be hard to fill." The Assam government announced that Handique would be cremated with full state honours. Government offices and educational institutions of the district observed a half-holiday.

On 27 July, Handique's body was taken to the Hemalata Handique Memorial Institute School and to the office of the Jorhat District Congress Committee. He was cremated with full state honours at the Tarajan cremation ground, with his daughter Maitreyee liting the funeral pyre at 6 PM amid a gun salute by Assam police personnel. Many political leaders, workers, representatives of various organisations and locals were present.

== Awards and accolades ==
Handique was conferred the Venu Menon National Animal Award for Leadership in Conservation in the year 2006, for his key role in conservation of rare birds.

== Books ==
Handique's debates, speeches & interventions as a Parliamentarian during the last 35 years (including one term in Rajya Sabha) have been recorded in three unedited volumes:

- A Life in Parliament: Volume 1 (Rajya Sabha 1980-1986)
- A Life in Parliament: Volume II (Lok Sabha 1991-2004)
- A Life in Parliament: Volume III (Lok Sabha and Rajya Sabha 2004-2014)

Political offices
Unknown	Minister of Mines; May 2009 – 18 January 2011	Succeeded by Dinsha Patel
Preceded by Mani Shankar Aiyar	Minister of Development of North Eastern Region; May 2009 – July 2011	Succeeded by Paban Singh Ghatowar
Unknown	Minister of State, Chemicals and Fertilizers; 2004–2009	Succeeded by Srikant Jena
