= Kamakhya Prasad Tasa =

Indian politician (born 1975)

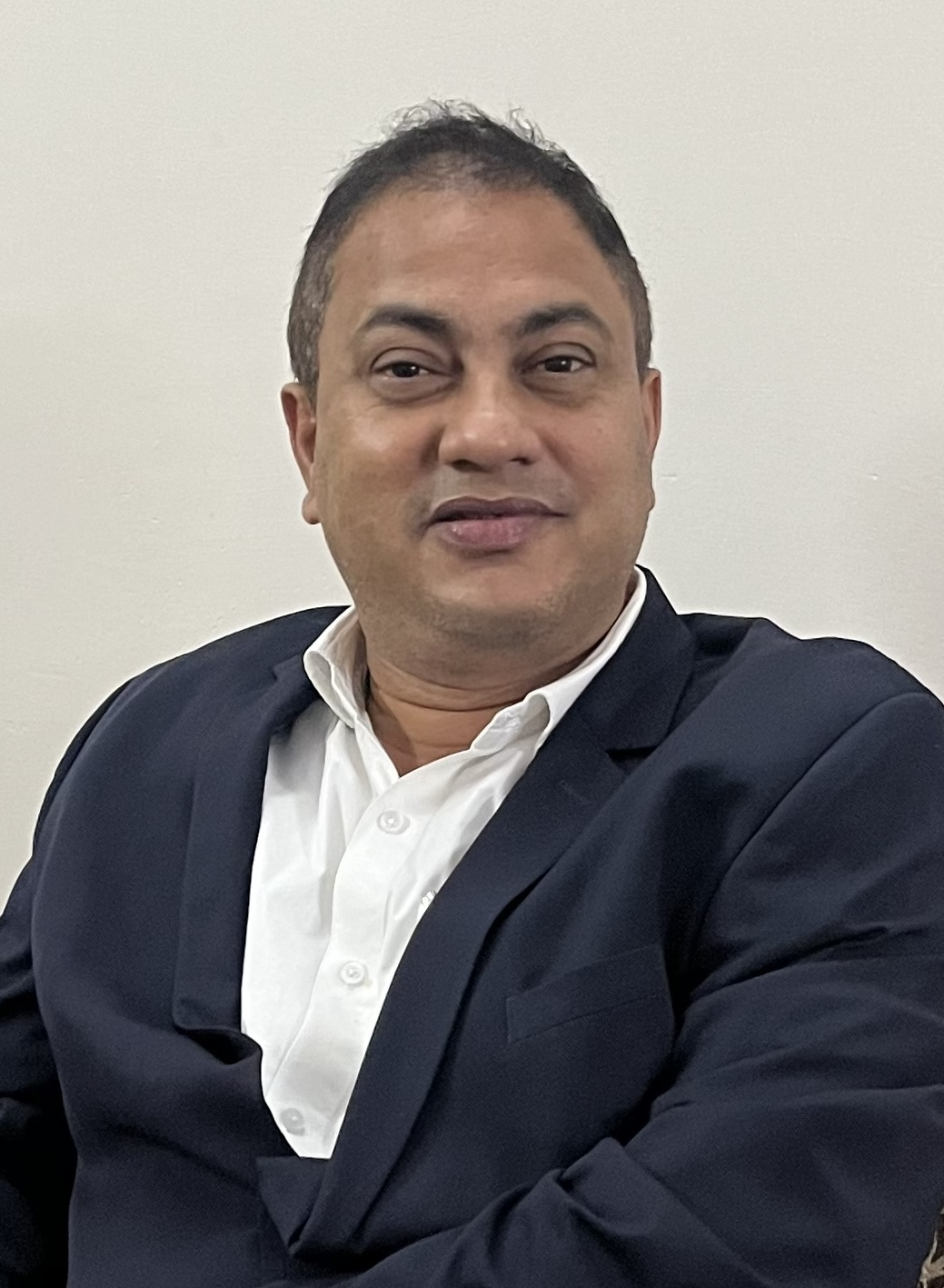
- Tasa in 2022

Member of Parliament, Lok Sabha
- Incumbent
- Assumed office 4 June 2024
- Constituency: Kaziranga

Member of Parliament, Rajya Sabha
- In office 14 June 2019 – 4 June 2024
- Preceded by: Manmohan Singh
- Succeeded by: Mission Ranjan Das
- Constituency: Assam

Member of Parliament, Lok Sabha
- In office 16 May 2014 – 23 May 2019
- Preceded by: Bijoy Krishna Handique
- Succeeded by: Topon Kumar Gogoi
- Constituency: Jorhat

National Secretary of Bharatiya Janata Party
- Incumbent
- Assumed office 29 July 2023

Personal details
- Born: 1 June 1975 (age 51) Jorhat, Assam, India
- Party: Bharatiya Janata Party
- Spouse: Kabita Tasa
- Children: 1 daughter
- Education: Dibrugarh University

Kamakhya Prasad Tasa (born 1 June 1975) is an Indian politician. He is currently member of parliament in Rajya Sabha representing Assam since 14 June 2019 and the National Secretary of Bharatiya Janata Party (BJP) since 2023. He was also a Member of Parliament, Lok Sabha from Jorhat being a BJP candidate from 2014 to 2019 and the State Vice President of the BJP in Assam from 2013 to 2017. Kamakhya Prasad Tasa is seen as a formidable leader with a strong and substantial following base. He is credited with BJP's growing influence in various caste groups who have settled all over Assam, specially those having arrived in the quest of jobs in the state's tea gardens. His role as a party leader is pivotal for the success of Bharatiya Janata Party (BJP) in the whole North-Eastern Part of India along with the convener of North-East Democratic Alliance (NEDA) Dr. Himanta Biswa Sarma who is the current Chief Minister of Assam.

== Early life ==
Kamakhya Prasad Tasa belonging to the community of Tea Tribes of Assam was born to Dewaram Tasa at Hattigarh Tea Estate, Jorhat, Assam. He received an M.A. degree in political science from Jagannath Barooah College, Jorhat, Assam under Dibrugarh University.

== Political career ==
Kamakhya Prasad Tasa came into the limelight in the arena of national politics in India when he was elected as Member of Parliament (MP) in the 16th Lok Sabha elections from Jorhat constituency in Assam. He has held as member of various committees during his tenure at Lok Sabha from 2014 to 2019. He was a member of the Standing Committee on Petroleum and Natural Gas from 1 September 2014 to 31 August 2017. He has been serving as a member of Consultative Committee, Ministry of Development of North Eastern Region (DoNER) and Committee on Private Members Bills and Resolutions since 15 September 2014 till the dissolution of the 16th Lok Sabha term. He was also a member of Standing Committee on Rural Development formed on 1 September 2017. On 8 February 2017 he became a member of the National Jute Board.

Kamakhya Prasad Tasa was elected unopposed in June 2019 to Rajya Sabha from Assam. The seat fell vacant with the expiry of term of the former Prime Minister of India, Dr Manmohan Singh who had been representing Assam at Rajya Sabha for five consecutive terms since 1991.

Kamakhya Prasad Tasa's political career as a leader started at the age of 16, when he became the Secretary of the Assam Tea Tribes Students' Association, Jorhat Branch in 1991. He served as the secretary of the students' association for five years till 1995. In the same year, he was elevated to the position of General Secretary of the central body of the Assam Tea Tribes Students' Association (ATTSU). He served as the General Secretary of the central body of the students' wing for two terms of 8 years consolidated from 1995 to 2000 and 2000 to 2003.

Tasa has also held various positions in addition to the positions mentioned above. He was a forefront member of J B College, Jorhat Political Science Study Circle for the term of 1993–1994. He was a Court Member of Dibugarh University in 1997–1998. He also turned to be the Convenor to the Tea Community Sub-Committee of the Assam Sahitya Sabha and Executive Member of the Assam Sahitya Sabha for the term of 1998 to 2000. He was an executive member of the Chah Jaangusthi Kala Sanskriti Council under Sankardev Kalakhetra Samaj.

In the arena of national party politics, Kamakhya Prasad Tasa served as the Vice President of BJP Assam Pradesh from 2013 till the year 2017. Before that he served as the convenor of the Tea Tribes Cell of Bharatiya Janata Party, Assam Pradesh for two consecutive terms from 2005 to 2007 and 2007 to 2010. He was also a Member of the State Election Committee of Bharatiya Party for the years 2000 to 2002.

== Positions held ==
- Member of Parliament, Lok Sabha
  - Constituency – Jorhat (Assam, India)
  - Term – 2014–2019
- Parliamentary Standing Committee
  - Joint Committee on Bill to amend the Citizenship Act - 1955
  - Rural Development
  - Member, Standing Committee on Petroleum and Natural Gas (1 Sep. 2014 – 31 Aug. 2017)
- Member of Parliament, Rajya Sabha
  - Term: 2019–2025
