= Suruj Dehingia =

Indian politician (born 1976)

Suraj Dehingia

Assam Legislative Assembly
- Incumbent
- Assumed office 4 May 2026
- Constituency: Mahmora Assembly constituency

Suruj Dehingia (born 1976) is an Indian politician from Assam. He is a member of the Assam Legislative Assembly from the Mahmora Assembly constituency in Charaideo district representing the Bharatiya Janata Party.

== Early life and education ==
Dehingia is from Moranhat town, Charaideo district, Assam. He is the son of the late Rameswar Dehingia. He completed his BA at Moran College, Moranhat, which is affiliated with Dibrugarh University in 1998. He runs his own business while his wife is a teacher. He declared assets worth Rs.2 crore in his affidavit to the Election Commission of India.

== Career ==
Dehingia won the Mahmora Assembly constituency representing the Bharatiya Janata Party in the 2026 Assam Legislative Assembly election. He polled 69,530 votes and defeated his nearest rival, Jnyandip Mohan of the Indian National Congress, by a margin of 16,021 votes.
