= Mofida Ahmed =

Indian politician

Member of Parliament, Lok Sabha
- In office 1957–1962
- Preceded by: Debeswar Sarmah
- Succeeded by: Rajendranath Barua
- Constituency: Jorhat

Personal details
- Born: November 1921 Jorhat Town, India
- Died: 17 January 2008 (aged 86)
- Party: Indian National Congress
- Spouse: Asanuddin Ahmed (m. 1940)
- Occupation: Politician
- Known for: One of the first few Muslim women to be a Member of Parliament in India

Mofida Ahmed (November 1921–17 December 2008) was an Indian politician belonging to the Indian National Congress. She was one of the first few Muslim women to be a Member of Parliament in India. In the 1957 parliamentary elections, Ahmed secured 80,028 votes, defeating Syed Abdul Malik of the CPI, who received 33,713 votes.

== Early life and education ==
She was born in Jorhat Town to Md. Barua Ali in November 1921. She pursued her education privately. Later in life, she contributed articles to Assamese journals. Her works include Biswadip-Bapuji and Bharatar-Nehru.

== Career ==
Ahmed worked for the National Savings Scheme in an honorary capacity (14-7-55 to 19-1-57), as a Joint Secretary at Red Cross Society, Jorhat (1946–1949). She was also the Convener of The Women's department of the Congress at Golaghat since its inception in 1953 to the end of 1956. She also served as the assistant Secretary at Tezpur District to the Mahila Samiti (October 1951 to January 1953) at maternity welfare for rescue of fallen women.

== Personal life ==
She married Asanuddin Ahmed on 11 December 1940. She liked reading, knitting, sewing and gardening . She died at the age of 88 on 17 January 2008 following old age ailments.
