= Anwar Hussain (politician) =

Indian politician (born 1947)

Member of parliament – Lok Sabha
- In office 2004–2009
- Preceded by: Abdul Hamid
- Succeeded by: Badruddin Ajmal
- Constituency: Dhubri

Personal details
- Born: 1 April 1947 (age 79) Bongaigaon, Assam
- Party: Indian National Congress
- Spouse: Syeda Afruza Begum
- Children: 3 sons and 4 daughters
- As of 25 September, 2006

Syed Anwar Hussain (born 1 April 1947) is an Indian politician from Assam. He was a member of the 14th Lok Sabha of India. He represented the Dhubri Lok Sabha constituency in Assam from 2004 to 2009 representing the Indian National Congress (INC).

== Early life and education ==
Hussainn is from Dhubri, Guwahati, Assam. He is the son of Sayed Ali. He did his Matriculation at Chapar HIgh School, Gauhati University in 1963, and later completed his BSc from BN College, Dhubri, Gauhati University in 1967.

== Career ==
He polled 376,588 and defeated his nearest rival Afzalur Rahman of Asom Gan Parishad, who got 259,966 votes. There were 11 candidates in the fray including Jabeen Borbhuyan of the Bharatiya Janata Party, who polled 90,215 votes.
