= Hitendra Nath Goswami =

Indian politician

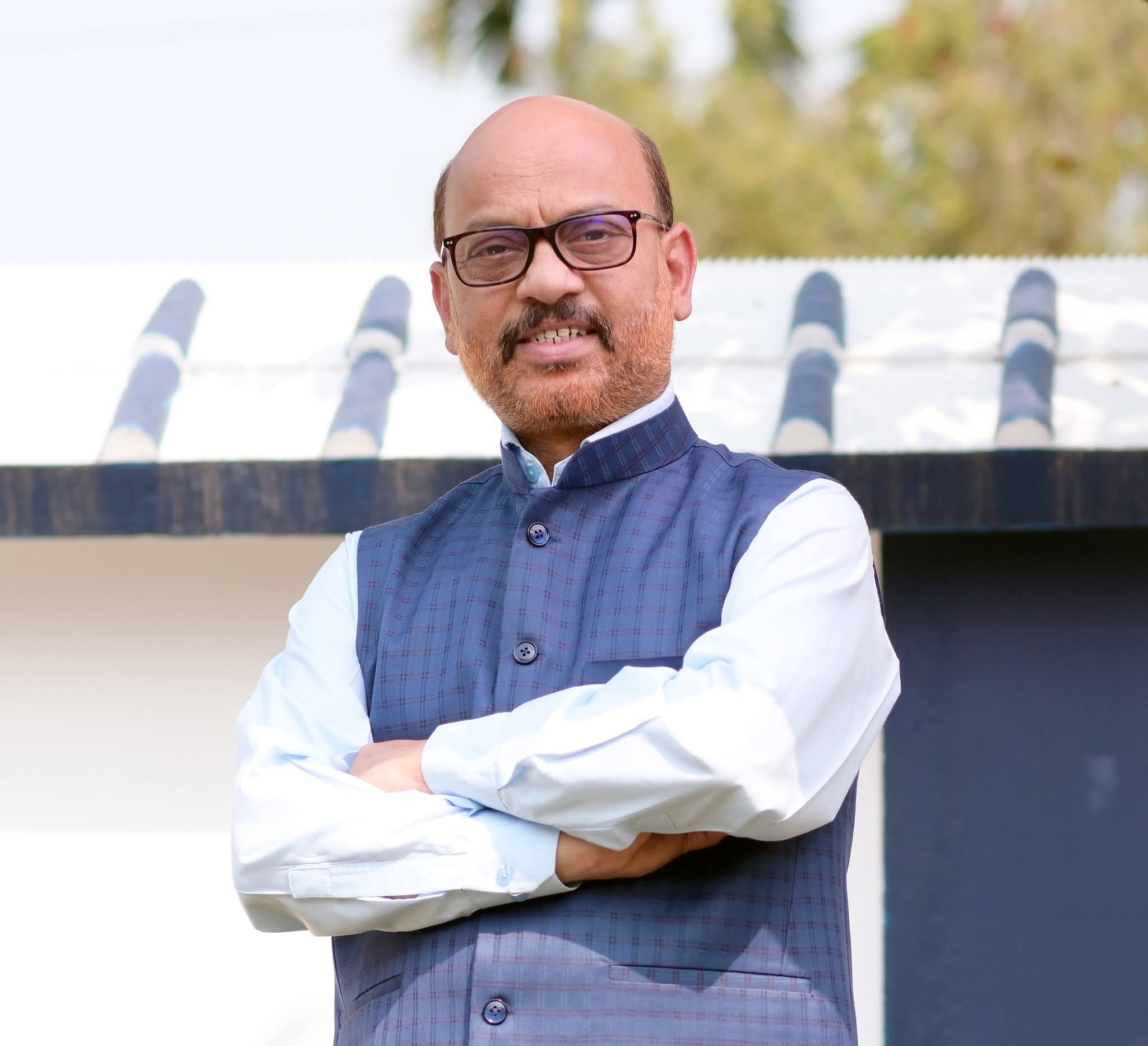
- Goswami in 2024

Member Assam Legislative Assembly
- Incumbent
- Assumed office 19 May 2016
- Preceded by: Rana Goswami
- Constituency: Jorhat
- In office 19 June 1991 – 11 May 2006
- Preceded by: Abhijit Sarmah
- Succeeded by: Rana Goswami
- Constituency: Jorhat

Speaker of Assam Legislative Assembly
- In office 30 January 2017 – 20 May 2021
- Preceded by: Ranjit Kumar Das
- Succeeded by: Biswajit Daimary

Minister of Power of Assam
- In office 1996 - 2001
- Chief Minister: Prafulla Kumar Mahanta

Personal details
- Born: 1 January 1959 (age 67) Jorhat, Assam, India
- Party: Bharatiya Janata Party (2013-present)
- Other political affiliations: Asom Gana Parishad (1991–2013)
- Spouse: Malabika Goswami
- Children: 1
- Education: St. Edmund's College, Shillong (B.Sc, Chemistry); Gauhati University, (M.Sc, Chemistry and LLB)
- Occupation: Politician

Hitendra Nath Goswami is an Indian politician from Bharatiya Janata Party. He served as Speaker of Assam Legislative Assembly from 30 January 2017 to 20 May 2021. Goswami is a member of Assam Legislative Assembly from Jorhat constituency. He was a member of Asom Gana Parishad until 16 February 2013, when he resigned from the party membership "expressing his frustration at the failure of the party leadership to bring in new blood to revive the regional force". He joined BJP on 10 March 2014 in New Delhi. However, he made it clear that he had nothing against the aims and objectives of the regional force and he would always continue his anti-Congress stand.

== Early life and education ==
Hitendra Nath Goswami is the sixth among eight siblings of Late Shrinath Deva Goswami and Late Smt. Rambha Goswami, who was the Satradhikar of Madhu-Mishra Satra and a prominent citizen of Jorhat. His father was a gold medalist of University of Calcutta and founder of three educational Institutions namely –i) Deepling Higher Secondary School, Sibsagar District ii) Dhekial Higher Secondary School, Golaghat District and iii) Borbheta Primary and High School at Jorhat District, eventually retiring from the Agricultural Department in 1965 as Sugarcane Inspector. Born on 1 January 1959, Hiten Goswami started his schooling at the school established by his father at Borbheta and shifted to Jorhat Govt. Boys' H.S and M.P. School for high school level. He excelled in H.S.S.L.C from Jagannath Barooah College, Jorhat in 1976 and joined St. Edmunds College, Shillong for graduation. During the same time he started North East Region Student Union (which later on became North East Region Students' Union, NESO) as the founder convener for the cause of N.E.India. He played an active role in the Assam Movement and due to his agitational activities against the illegal immigration and atrocities of the Indian Army on the local populace he was arrested and was sent to Silchar Jail and Tihar Jail under N.S.A. He lost a few academic years but with immense grit and determination received his bachelor's degree and master's degree (1985) in Chemistry with 1st Class from Gauhati University. Having seen the excesses of law (use of arbitrary arrest, illegal detention and torture of the protesters) during the Assam Movement and feeling the need to defend the powerless he pursued LLB degree from Gauhati University, graduated in 1987 and started working in the Gauhati High Court. In a short period of time he gained a lot of respect as a lawyer. He is married to Malabika Goswami and he has a daughter, Chandrayee, who is currently pursuing her bachelor's degree in Miranda House (Delhi University). The spirit of commitment to the society with honesty, integrity and humanity was a family tradition with all his siblings excelling in each of their fields of activity.

1. Late Protima Goswami (Sister), who was Post Graduate in Philosophy and married to Dr Trilochan Deva Goswami, retired Professor of Physics in Gauhati University.

2. Dr Dipendra Nath Goswami (Brother) is an engineer and a consultant and has settled in USA.

3. Dr Nripendra Nath Goswami (Brother) is a respected private practitioner at Jorhat since 1979.

4. Dr Jitendra Nath Goswami (Brother) is a space scientist known as "Moon man of India". He was the principal scientist of India's Moon mission and currently chairman of the advisory board for the follow-up mission, Chandrayaan-2.

5. Prativa Goswami (Sister) is married to Dr Birendra Nath Goswami, Retired Scientist of North East Institute of Science and Technology, Jorhat (NEIST) previously known as R.R.L., Jorhat.

6. Chitendra Nath Goswami (Brother) a post Graduate of Sanskrit is a retired Senior Management Level officer of State Bank of India.

7. Nritendra Nath Goswami (Brother) is working with UCO Bank in senior position.

== Career ==
In 1991, he was requested to fight the Assam Assembly Election from Jorhat constituency as an A.G.P. (Asom Gana Parishad) candidate. Though he did not have any political background, he left his successful career and decided to enter active politics to fight for the aspirations of the Assamese society. He contested the 1991 Assam Legislative Assembly election, defeating runner-up Indian National Congress (Congress) candidate Dina Nath Rajkhowa by a margin of 4.73 per cent votes. He went on to win the 1996 and 2001 Assam legislative assembly election. In 1996 he was made a Power minister and served until 2001. Out of his 3 terms in the assembly, two terms were spent as an Opposition member. In a recent TV debate, he said due to the severe financial crisis during his terms in Jorhat, he couldn't complete large scale initiatives for the people. In-spite of the immense fund crunch, with effective planning and management he was able to complete a few remarkable activities:

1. Construction of spurs at Neemati for protection of Jorhat from the erosion by the Brahmaputra River.

2. Preparing of Master Plan for solving the drinking water problem of Jorhat town by bringing water from Brahmaputra river. Due to non-availability of funds during his tenure this plan couldn't be executed and it is in the back burner since the last decade since he left office. Goswami said in a recent debate that this project is the topmost priority after he managed to win the 2016 Assam legislative assembly election.

3. Widening of Baruah Charali and construction of Millennium Park to ease traffic movement and restricting anti-social activities in that area. He had started an NGO (Janahit) when he started his career as a lawyer for providing medical treatment for the poor and needy. The NGO maintains the park and Children Library at Gandhi Park.

4. Establishing the Rain Forest Research Institute at Jorhat with active involvement and convincing the Central Government, since it wanted to shift the location.

5. Construction of Jorhat Municipal Board office and Zilla Parishad Building in the heart of Jorhat.

Taking a cue from his father he had also constructed schools, libraries, clubs and other socio-cultural institutions with the limited funds.

He left AGP in 2013 and joined BJP in 2014. He won in the 2016 and 2021 elections for Jorhat.
