= 2004 Indian general election =

- 20 April 26 April, 5 and 10 May 2004

543 of the 545 seats in the Lok Sabha (Note: Two seats were reserved for Anglo-Indians and filled by presidential nomination) 272 seats needed for a majority
- Registered: 671,487,930
- Turnout: 58.07% (▼1.92pp)
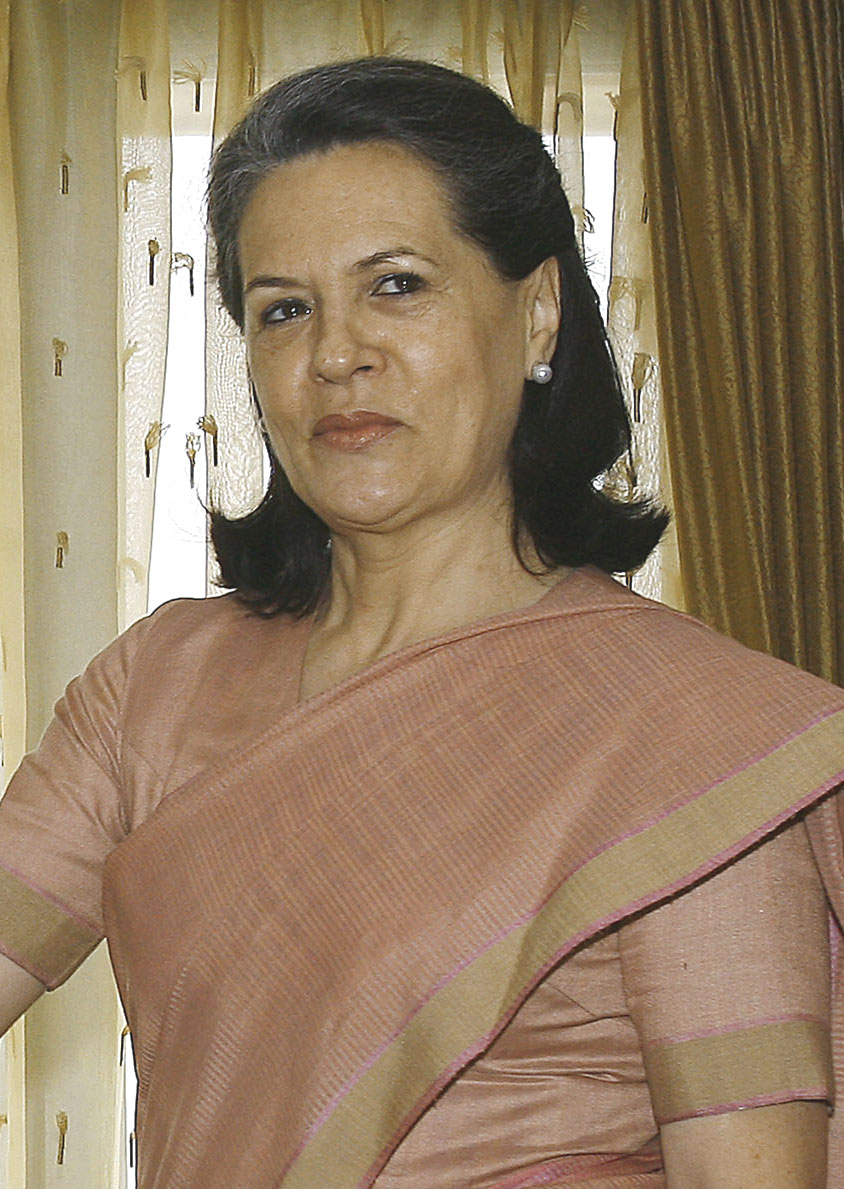

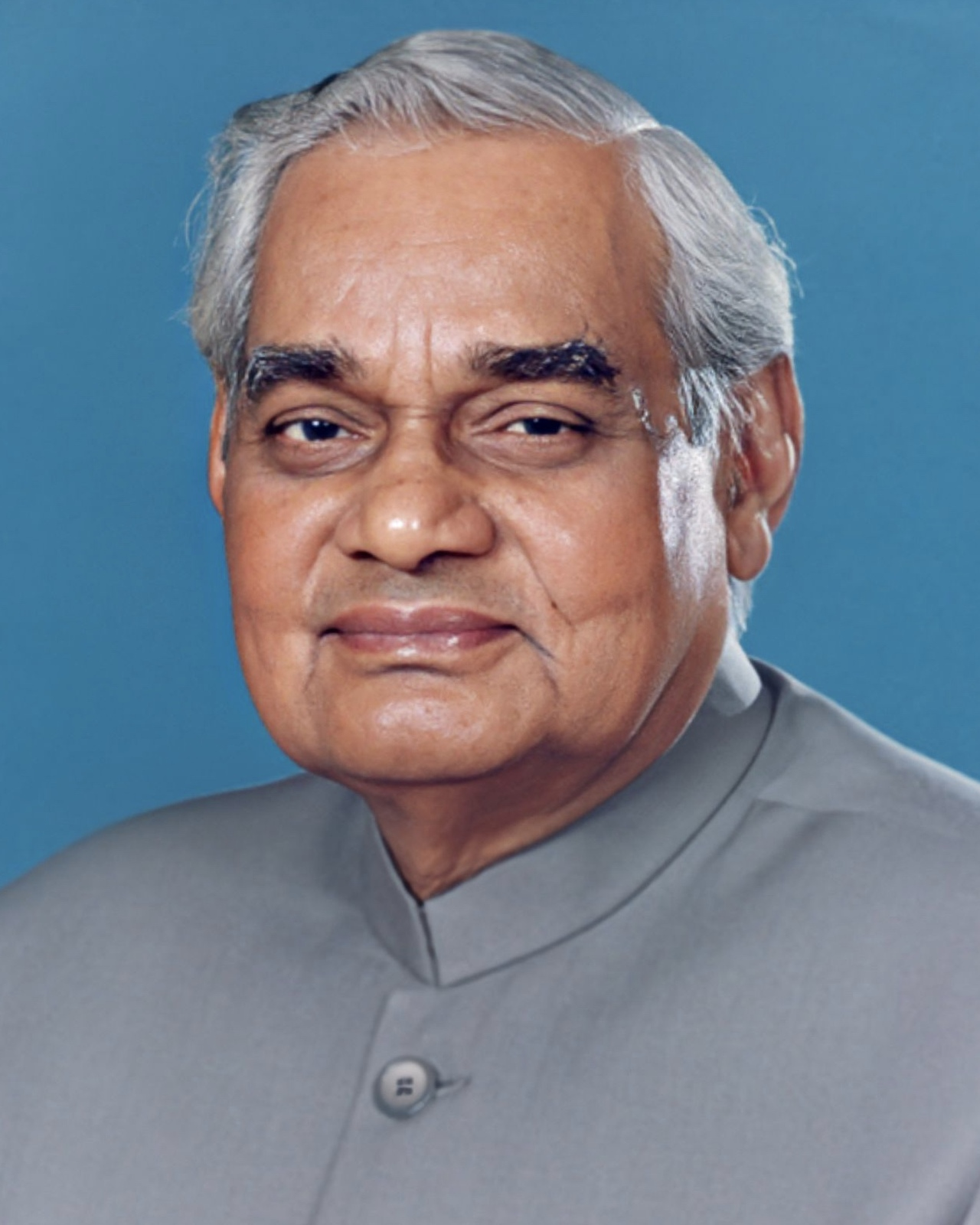

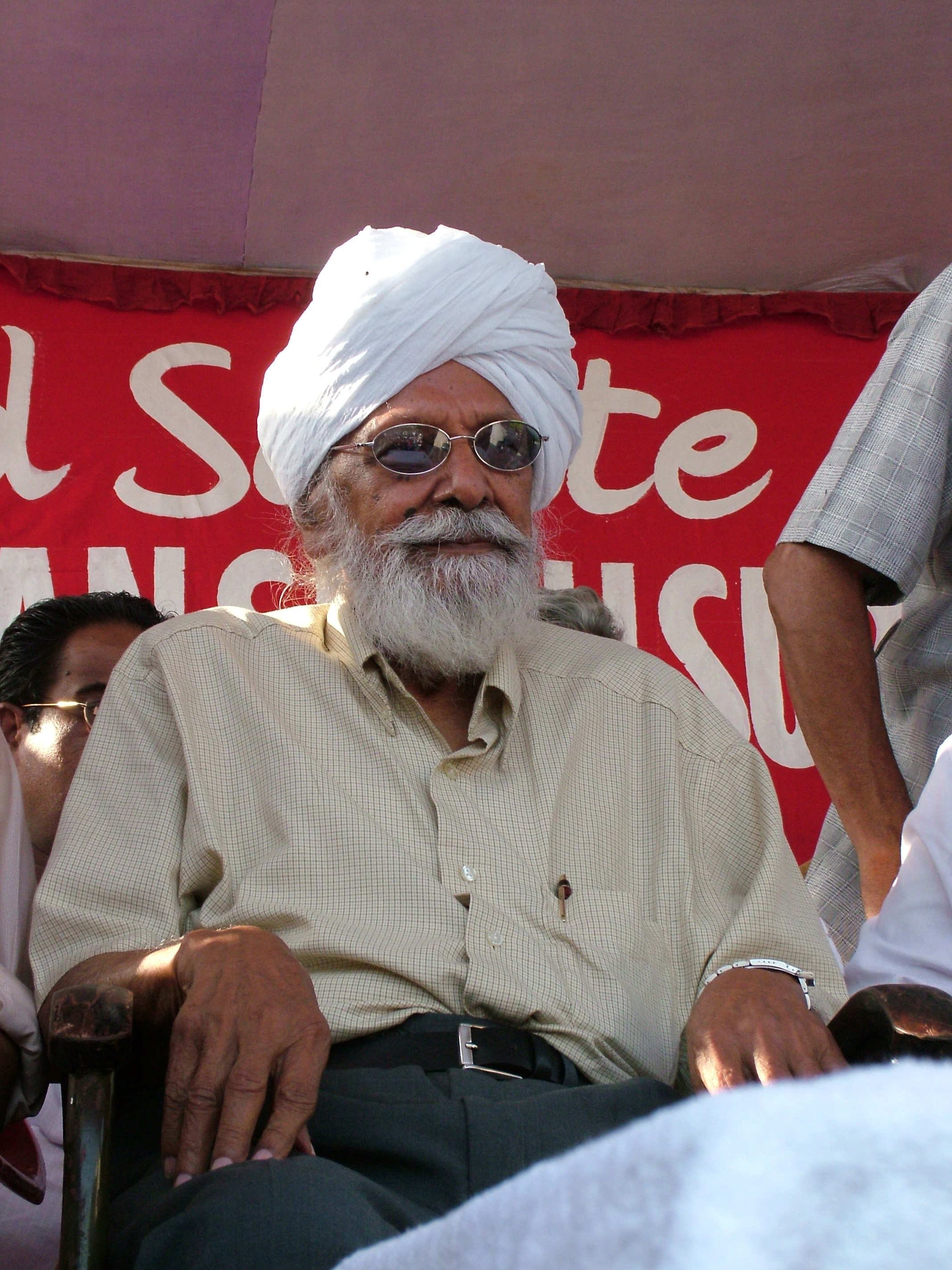
	First party	Second party	Third party
Leader	Sonia Gandhi	Atal Bihari Vajpayee	Harkishan Singh Surjeet
Party	INC	BJP	CPI(M)
Leader's seat	Rae Bareli (won)	Lucknow (won)	Did not contest
Last election	28.30%, 114 seats	23.75%, 182 seats	5.40%, 33 seats
Seats won	145	138	43
Seat change	▲31	▼44	▲10
Popular vote	103,408,949	86,371,561	22,070,614
Percentage	26.53%	22.16%	5.66%
Swing	▼1.77pp	▼1.59pp	▲0.26pp
Alliance seats	218	181	60
- Results by constituency
Prime Minister before election
Atal Bihari Vajpayee
BJP
Prime Minister after election
Manmohan Singh
INC

General elections were held in India in four phases between 20 April and 10 May 2004. Over 670 million people were eligible to vote, electing 543 members of the 14th Lok Sabha. Seven states also held simultaneous assembly elections to elect state governments. They were the first elections fully carried out with electronic voting machines (EVMs).

On 13 May the Bharatiya Janata Party (BJP), the lead party of the National Democratic Alliance conceded an upset defeat. The Indian National Congress, which had governed India for all but five years from independence until 1996, returned to power after a record six years out of office. It was unable to put a majority alone in 2004. It formed United Progressive Alliance (UPA), which had together a comfortable majority of more than 335 members out of 543 with the help of its allies. The 335 members included both the Congress-led United Progressive Alliance, the governing coalition formed after the election and external support from the Left Front, who threatened to withdraw their support during Nuclear Deal.

== Background ==
In February 2004, the 13th Lok Sabha was dissolved prematurely—eight months ahead of the end of its normal five-year term in September–October 2004—to clear the path for early general elections.

The decision to advance the polls was driven by a wave of political confidence within the ruling National Democratic Alliance (NDA), led by the Bharatiya Janata Party (BJP). This optimism was heavily bolstered by the BJP's sweeping victories in the November 2003 assembly elections across three major heartland states—Madhya Pradesh, Chhattisgarh, and Rajasthan—where they defeated the incumbent Indian National Congress (INC) governments. Furthermore, the ruling leadership was encouraged by positive macroeconomic indicators, including a strong GDP growth rate (recording 8.4% in the second quarter of 2003), rapidly swelling foreign exchange reserves exceeding $100 billion, and visible infrastructure developments such as the Golden Quadrilateral highway network.

Buoyed by these factors, alongside opinion polls predicting a comfortable return to power for the NDA, the Union Cabinet recommended the dissolution of the house. Prime Minister Atal Bihari Vajpayee formally advised President A. P. J. Abdul Kalam, who accepted the recommendation and dissolved the 13th Lok Sabha on 6 February 2004 under Article 85(2)(b) of the Constitution. This set the stage for the staggered 14th general election held between April and May 2004, which ultimately birthed the high-profile "India Shining" campaign.

== Organisation ==
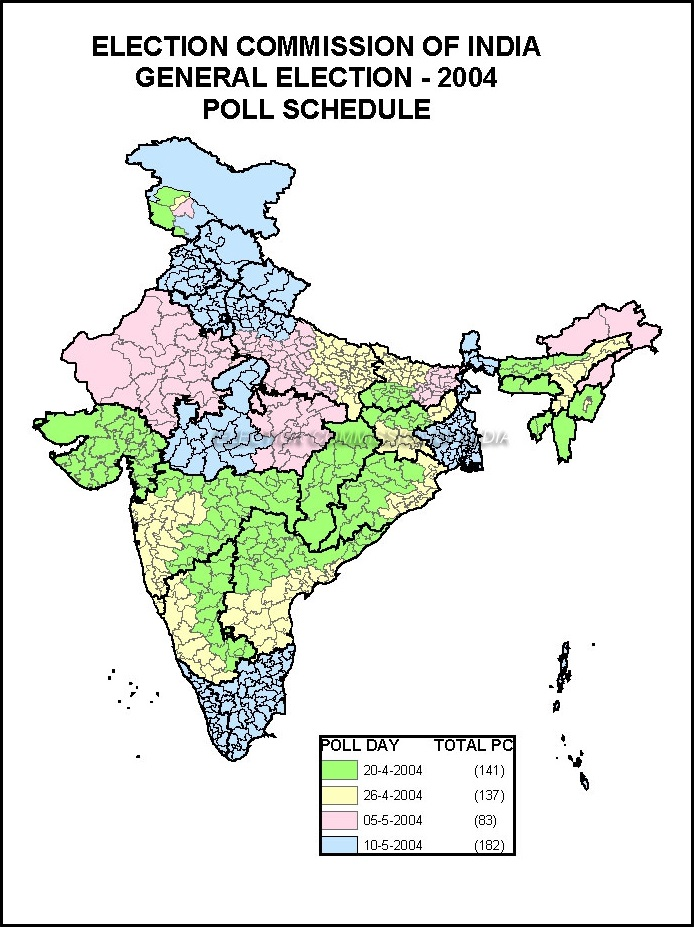
Map indicating the phases of polling during the 2004 general election

The 2004 Indian general election was conducted in four distinct phases to ensure administrative efficiency, maintain law and order, and manage security deployments across the country. The polling schedule across the 543 parliamentary constituencies was organized as follows:

- Phase 1 (20 April): 141 constituencies across 16 states and union territories.
- Phase 2 (26 April): 137 constituencies across 11 states and union territories.
- Phase 3 (5 May): 83 constituencies across 7 states and union territories.
- Phase 4 (10 May): 182 constituencies across 16 states and union territories.

Vote counting took place simultaneously nationwide on 13 May 2004. Out of 675 million eligible voters, over 370 million citizens exercised their franchise, resulting in a national turnout of approximately 58.07%.

=== Electoral logistics and security ===
The Election Commission of India (ECI) executed the massive electoral exercise under the stewardship of Chief Election Commissioner T. S. Krishnamurthy and Election Commissioners B. S. Rocha and Navin Chawla. To modernize the electoral process and ensure transparency, the ECI deployed over one million electronic voting machines (EVMs) across all polling booths, completely replacing paper ballots nationwide for the first time in a general election of this scale.

Security remained a primary logistical challenge. Although election-related violence resulted in 48 deaths—less than half the casualties recorded during the 1999 general election—sensitive regions, including parts of left-wing extremism-affected central India and insurgency-prone areas in Jammu and Kashmir and the Northeast, required extensive deployment of central paramilitary forces and the armed forces. On average, each parliamentary constituency comprised approximately 1.2 million registered voters, with dimensions ranging from compact urban seats to sprawling rural constituencies exceeding 3.1 million electors.

=== Campaign expenditure and logistics ===
Campaign financing during the 2004 election reflected the expanding scale of Indian democracy. According to estimates by India Today, all political parties combined spent an estimated 115.62 billion rupees (approx. $2.6 billion USD at the time) on campaign activities, rallies, logistics, and publicity.

Although the ECI legally capped individual candidate campaign expenses at 2.5 million rupees per constituency, actual expenditure by major political formations significantly exceeded statutory limits. Logistical mobilization consumed a substantial portion of campaign budgets: approximately 6.5 billion rupees were deployed to lease and operate over 150,000 motor vehicles, while roughly 1 billion rupees were spent on helicopter and private aircraft charters to transport star campaigners across vast geographical distances.

=== State-wise polling schedule ===
Phase-wise polling constituencies across states and union territories
State / Union territory	Total seats	Election dates and number of constituencies			
State / Union territory	Total seats	Phase 1	Phase 2	Phase 3	Phase 4
State / Union territory	Total seats	20 April	26 April	5 May	10 May
Andhra Pradesh	42	21	21	—	—
Arunachal Pradesh	2	—	—	2	—
Assam	14	6	8	—	—
Bihar	40	11	17	12	—
Chhattisgarh	11	11	—	—	—
Goa	2	—	2	—	—
Gujarat	26	26	—	—	—
Haryana	10	—	—	—	10
Himachal Pradesh	4	—	—	—	4
Jammu and Kashmir	6	2	1	1	2
Jharkhand	14	6	8	—	—
Karnataka	28	15	13	—	—
Kerala	20	—	—	—	20
Madhya Pradesh	29	—	—	12	17
Maharashtra	48	24	24	—	—
Manipur	2	1	1	—	—
Meghalaya	2	2	—	—	—
Mizoram	1	1	—	—	—
Nagaland	1	—	—	1	—
Odisha	21	11	10	—	—
Punjab	13	—	—	—	13
Rajasthan	25	—	—	25	—
Sikkim	1	—	—	—	1
Tamil Nadu	39	—	—	—	39
Tripura	2	2	—	—	—
Uttar Pradesh	80	—	32	30	18
Uttarakhand	5	—	—	—	5
West Bengal	42	—	—	—	42
Andaman and Nicobar Islands	1	—	—	—	1
Chandigarh	1	—	—	—	1
Dadra and Nagar Haveli	1	1	—	—	—
Daman and Diu	1	1	—	—	—
Delhi	7	—	—	—	7
Lakshadweep	1	—	—	—	1
Puducherry	1	—	—	—	1
Total constituencies polling on this day	543	141	137	83	182
Total states / UTs polling on this day	35	16	11	7	16
Cumulative constituencies completed	543	141	278	361	543
Cumulative percentage complete	100%	26%	51%	66%	100%
Phased distribution summary		States and UTs		Constituencies	
States and UTs polling in a single phase		24		219	
States and UTs polling in two phases		8		198	
States and UTs polling in three phases		2		120	
States and UTs polling in four phases		1		6	
Total aggregate		35 states/UTs		543 constituencies	

== Pre-poll alliances ==
Unlike the fragmented multi-cornered contests of the 1990s, the 2004 general election increasingly crystallized into a bipolar national contest between two dominant coalitions: the incumbent National Democratic Alliance (NDA), led by the Bharatiya Janata Party (BJP), and a resurgent, aligned opposition anchored by the Indian National Congress (INC). Despite this national bipolarity, state-level electoral dynamics remained deeply regionalized, shaped heavily by local party systems and strategic alliance-building.

=== The National Democratic Alliance (NDA) ===
The BJP contested the elections at the head of the ruling NDA. While the coalition retained several core partners, its network of regional allies had shifted compared to 1999. Crucial seat-sharing arrangements were secured with powerful regional heavyweights, such as the Telugu Desam Party (TDP) in Andhra Pradesh and the All India Anna Dravida Munnetra Kazhagam (AIADMK) in Tamil Nadu. However, anti-incumbency pressures at the state level and miscalculations surrounding the national "India Shining" campaign severely impacted several key NDA constituents.

=== The Congress-led coalition strategy ===
In a strategic pivot from its previous solo-contesting policy, the Congress aggressively pursued state-level pre-poll alliances to counter its vote fragmentation and organizational decline in critical regions. Failing to forge a monolithic national anti-BJP front, the party successfully negotiated vital regional alliances—most notably forming the precursor to the United Progressive Alliance (UPA). This included pacts with regional forces like the Dravida Munnetra Kazhagam (DMK) in Tamil Nadu, the Rashtriya Janata Dal (RJD) in Bihar, and the Nationalist Congress Party (NCP) in Maharashtra. This election marked a paradigm shift as the Congress institutionalized a pragmatic coalition strategy to bridge its state-level vote deficits.

=== The Left Front ===
The Left Front, led by the Communist Party of India (Marxist) (CPI(M)) and the Communist Party of India (CPI), maintained its independent electoral posture in its traditional strongholds of West Bengal, Tripura, and Kerala, directly challenging both Congress and NDA candidates. Conversely, in states where the Left lacked independent primacy—such as Tamil Nadu (allied via the DMK-led Democratic Progressive Alliance) and parts of Andhra Pradesh—the Left parties coordinated strategic seat adjustments with the broader secular opposition to defeat the BJP and its partners.

=== Third Force and non-aligned parties ===
Significantly, two major state-level parties in Uttar Pradesh—India's most populous state—opted to remain outside both major national formations: the Bahujan Samaj Party (BSP) and the Samajwadi Party (SP). Negotiations by the Congress to ally with either party collapsed, resulting in a fractured, multi-cornered contest across Uttar Pradesh. This multi-way split prevented either major national front from securing a decisive sweep in India's heartland, ultimately contributing to the historic fractured mandate that necessitated a post-poll "coalition of coalitions".

== Forecast and campaigns ==
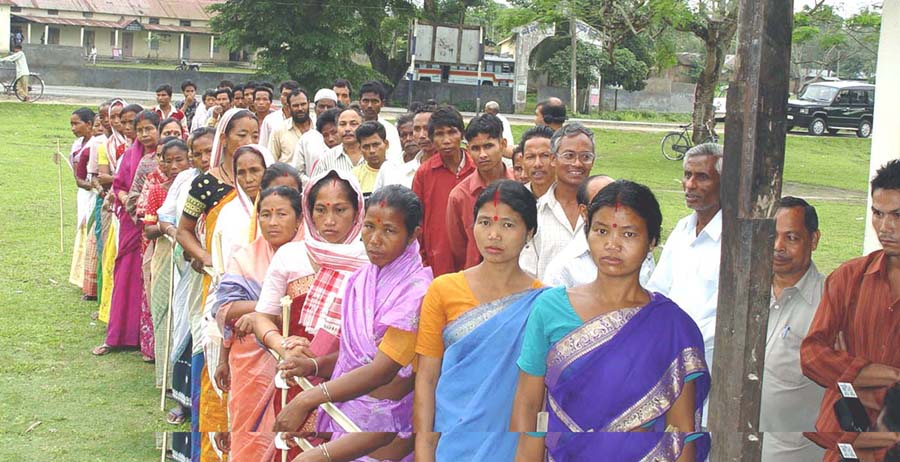
Voters queue at a polling station in the Nowgong constituency of Assam

Most analysts believed the NDA would win the elections. This assessment was also supported by opinion polls. The economy had shown steady growth in the last years and the disinvestment of government owned production units (a continuation of India's liberalisation policies ) had been on track. The Foreign Exchange Reserves of India stood at more than US$100 billion (7th largest in the world and a record for India). The service sector had also generated a lot of jobs. The Vajpayee government had launched numerous welfare schemes, thus starting the culture of "Yojana"s in Indian governments. The party was supposed to have been riding on a wave of the feel good factor, typified by its promotional campaign "India Shining".

In the past, BJP has largely been seen as a hardline Hindu right wing party with close ties with the hardline organisations the RSS and Vishva Hindu Parishad. Over the years, the party under Vajpayee has slightly distanced itself from hardline policies in order to accommodate a variety of parties within the NDA, like TMC (a Congress-breakaway party), breakaway factions of the Janata Dal like INLD, RLD, JD(U) and BJD, Dravidianist parties like DMK (which left the alliance in December 2003), PMK (which left the alliance in January 2004) and AIADMK (which joined after DMK left) and parties largely representing non-Hindus like SAD and JKNC (which joined the alliance in 2002), a change that was being questioned after the party's good performance in the 2003 assembly elections of Rajasthan, Madhya Pradesh & Chhattisgarh, Karnataka. These elections were marked by the campaign's emphasis on economic gains instead of issues involving religious polarisation. Ban on cow-slaughter, implementation of a Uniform Civil Code, construction of Ram-mandir at the site of Ayodhya, abolition of the provisions of secularism in order to make Hinduism the country's state religion etc. characterised BJP's campaign in the 1996 election. From the last few elections, BJP had realised that its voter base had reached a ceiling and had concentrated on pre-poll rather than post-poll alliances. The Vajpayee wave and foreign origin of Sonia Gandhi also constituted part of the NDA's campaign.

=== Opinion polls ===
Conducted in month(s)			
Conducted in month(s)	NDA	UPA	Other
August 2002	250	195	100
February 2003	315	115	115
August 2003	247	180	115
January 2004	335	110	100

=== Exit polls ===
Polling organisation			
Polling organisation	NDA	UPA	Other
NDTV-AC Nielsen	230-250	190-205	100-120
Star News-C voter	263-275	174-184	86-98
Aaj Tak-MARG	248	190	105
Sahara DRS	278	181	102
Zee News-Taleem	249	176	117
Actual result	181	218	143
Sources:-

== Voter turnout ==
State/UT	Seats	Electors			Voters			Turnout		
State/UT	Seats	Men	Women	Total	Men	Women	Total	Men	Women	Total
Andhra Pradesh	42	2,53,55,118	2,57,91,224	5,11,46,342	1,83,20,019	1,73,84,444	3,57,76,275	72.25	67.4	69.95%
Arunachal Pradesh	2	3,51,564	3,32,470	6,84,034	1,99,413	1,83,909	3,85,446	56.72	55.31	56.35%
Assam	14	78,21,591	71,93,283	1,50,14,874	56,71,454	47,01,710	1,03,77,354	72.51	65.36	69.11%
Bihar	40	2,70,53,408	2,35,06,264	5,05,59,672	1,71,95,139	1,21,34,913	2,93,32,306	63.56	51.62	58.02%
Chhattisgarh	11	69,04,742	68,14,700	1,37,19,442	40,39,747	31,00,827	71,46,189	58.51	45.50	52.09%
Goa	2	4,75,847	4,65,320	9,41,167	2,86,156	2,64,934	5,53,105	60.14	56.94	58.77%
Gujarat	26	1,73,41,760	1,63,33,302	3,36,75,062	86,64,929	65,43,424	1,52,13,501	49.97	40.06	45.18%
Haryana	10	66,60,631	56,59,926	1,23,20,557	45,36,234	35,54,361	80,97,064	68.11	62.80	65.72%
Himachal Pradesh	4	21,28,828	20,53,167	41,81,995	12,69,539	12,11,994	24,97,149	59.84	59.03	59.71%
Jammu & Kashmir	6	34,68,235	28,99,880	63,68,115	13,91,263	8,41,489	22,41,729	40.11	29.02	35.20%
Jharkhand	14	89,14,164	78,98,175	1,68,12,339	55,61,056	38,01,786	93,63,363	62.38	48.13	55.69%
Karnataka	28	1,96,05,257	1,89,86,838	3,85,92,095	1,31,19,442	1,19,62,519	2,51,39,122	66.92	63.00	65.14%
Kerala	20	1,01,68,428	1,09,57,045	2,11,25,473	74,80,351	75,67,329	1,50,93,960	73.56	69.06	71.45%
Madhya Pradesh	29	2,00,28,161	1,83,61,940	3,83,90,101	1,13,22,391	71,24,280	1,84,63,451	56.53	38.80	48.09%
Maharashtra	48	3,27,88,476	3,02,23,732	6,30,12,208	1,89,57,642	1,52,63,748	3,42,63,317	57.82	50.50	54.38%
Manipur	2	7,46,054	7,90,456	15,36,510	5,22,526	5,12,834	10,35,696	70.03	64.88	67.41%
Meghalaya	2	6,48,654	6,40,720	12,89,374	3,02,113	3,77,125	6,79,321	46.58	58.86	52.69%
Mizoram	1	2,73,454	2,76,505	5,49,959	1,75,372	1,70,000	3,49,799	64.13	61.48	63.60%
Nagaland	1	5,47,114	4,94,319	10,41,433	5,05,682	4,46,002	9,55,690	92.43	90.23	91.77%
Orissa	21	1,31,91,691	1,24,60,298	2,56,51,989	90,10,592	79,29,405	1,69,45,092	68.30	63.64	66.06%
Punjab	13	86,52,294	79,63,105	1,66,15,399	54,37,861	47,94,658	1,02,33,165	62.85	60.21	61.59%
Rajasthan	25	1,81,49,028	1,65,63,357	3,47,12,385	1,00,09,085	72,90,569	1,73,46,549	55.15	44.02	49.97%
Sikkim	1	1,45,738	1,36,199	2,81,937	1,12,404	1,02,890	2,19,769	77.13	75.54	77.95%
Tamil Nadu	39	2,32,69,301	2,39,82,970	4,72,52,271	1,50,06,523	1,36,42,797	2,87,32,954	64.49	56.89	60.81%
Tripura	2	10,23,368	9,54,854	19,78,222	7,14,491	6,04,452	13,27,000	69.82	63.30	67.08%
Uttar Pradesh	80	6,03,28,608	5,02,95,882	11,06,34,490	3,25,52,479	2,07,20,447	5,32,78,071	53.96	41.20	48.16%
Uttarakhand	5	28,38,204	27,24,433	55,62,637	14,70,496	11,97,917	26,73,832	51.81	43.97	48.16%
West Bengal	42	2,47,98,089	2,26,39,342	4,74,37,431	1,98,04,552	1,70,66,370	3,70,21,478	79.86	75.38	78.04%
Andaman & Nicobar Islands (UT)	1	1,31,502	1,10,143	2,41,645	83,520	70,284	1,53,841	63.51	63.81	63.66%
Chandigarh (UT)	1	2,92,438	2,53,246	5,27,684	1,51,932	1,17,886	2,69,849	51.95	50.11	51.14%
Dadra & Nagar Haveli (UT)	1	65,059	57,622	1,22,681	43,795	40,904	84,703	67.32	70.99	69.04%
Daman & Diu (UT)	1	39,595	39,637	79,232	29,751	55,591	25,839	65.26	75.06	70.16%
Lakshadweep (UT)	1	19,880	19,153	39,033	15,698	16,122	31,820	78.96	84.17	81.52%
NCT OF Delhi	7	49,53,925	38,09,550	87,63,475	24,28,289	16,97,944	41,26,443	49.02	44.57	47.09%
Pondicherry (UT)	1	3,10,658	3,26,009	6,36,667	2,40,114	2,44,202	4,84,336	77.29	74.91	76.07%
India	543	34,94,90,864	32,19,97,066	67,14,87,930	21,72,34,104	17,27,14,226	38,99,48,330	62.16	53.64	58.07%
Source-ECI

== Results ==
Seat share of parties in the election
1. INC (26.6%)
2. BJP (25.3%)
3. CPI(M) (7.88%)
4. SP (6.60%)
5. RJD (4.40%)
6. BSP (3.48%)
7. DMK (2.93%)
8. SHS (2.20%)
9. Other (20.6%)
Vote share of parties in the election
1. INC (26.5%)
2. BJP (22.2%)
3. CPI(M) (5.66%)
4. BSP (5.33%)
5. SP (4.32%)
6. TDP (3.04%)
7. RJD (2.41%)
8. JD(U) (2.35%)
9. Other (28.2%)

Party	Votes	%	Seats
Indian National Congress	103,408,949	26.53	145
Bharatiya Janata Party	86,371,561	22.16	138
Communist Party of India (Marxist)	22,070,614	5.66	43
Bahujan Samaj Party	20,765,229	5.33	19
Samajwadi Party	16,824,072	4.32	36
Telugu Desam Party	11,844,811	3.04	5
Rashtriya Janata Dal	9,384,147	2.41	24
Janata Dal (United)	9,144,963	2.35	8
All India Anna Dravida Munnetra Kazhagam	8,547,014	2.19	0
Trinamool Congress	8,071,867	2.07	2
Dravida Munnetra Kazhagam	7,064,393	1.81	16
Shiv Sena	7,056,255	1.81	12
Nationalist Congress Party	7,023,175	1.80	9
Janata Dal (Secular)	5,732,296	1.47	3
Communist Party of India	5,484,111	1.41	10
Biju Janata Dal	5,082,849	1.30	11
Shiromani Akali Dal	3,506,681	0.90	8
Lok Janshakti Party	2,771,427	0.71	4
Rashtriya Lok Dal	2,463,607	0.63	3
Telangana Rashtra Samithi	2,441,405	0.63	5
Pattali Makkal Katchi	2,169,020	0.56	6
Asom Gana Parishad	2,069,600	0.53	2
Indian National Lok Dal	1,936,703	0.50	0
Jharkhand Mukti Morcha	1,846,843	0.47	5
Revolutionary Socialist Party	1,689,794	0.43	3
Marumalarchi Dravida Munnetra Kazhagam	1,679,870	0.43	4
All India Forward Bloc	1,365,055	0.35	3
Communist Party of India (Marxist–Leninist) Liberation	1,281,688	0.33	0
Apna Dal	844,053	0.22	0
Indian Union Muslim League	770,098	0.20	1
Gondwana Ganatantra Party	720,189	0.18	0
Naga People's Front	715,366	0.18	1
Janata Party	517,683	0.13	0
Haryana Vikas Party	506,122	0.13	0
Jammu & Kashmir National Conference	493,067	0.13	2
Bharipa Bahujan Mahasangh	428,566	0.11	0
All India Majlis-e-Ittehadul Muslimeen	417,248	0.11	1
Shiromani Akali Dal (Simranjit Singh Mann)	387,682	0.10	0
Republican Party of India (Athawale)	367,510	0.09	1
National Loktantrik Party	367,049	0.09	1
Kerala Congress	353,905	0.09	1
Kannada Nadu Party	349,183	0.09	0
Samajwadi Janata Party (Rashtriya)	337,386	0.09	1
Peasants and Workers Party of India	319,572	0.08	0
Republican Party of India	295,545	0.08	0
Suheldev Bharatiya Samaj Party	275,267	0.07	0
PDP(in Kashmir)	267,457	0.07	1
Peoples Republican Party	261,219	0.07	0
Indian Federal Democratic Party	256,411	0.07	1
Kerala Congress (M)	209,880	0.05	0
Rashtriya Samanta Dal	209,694	0.05	0
Samta Party	201,276	0.05	0
Lok Bhalai Party	187,787	0.05	0
Mizo National Front	182,864	0.05	1
Bharatiya Navshakti Party	171,080	0.04	1
All Jharkhand Students Union	157,930	0.04	0
Sikkim Democratic Front	153,409	0.04	1
Marxist Co-ordination Committee	147,470	0.04	0
Rashtriya Samaj Paksha	146,571	0.04	0
Rashtriya Parivartan Dal	139,145	0.04	0
Jharkhand Disom Party	135,685	0.03	0
Pyramid Party of India	130,362	0.03	0
Ekta Shakti	126,924	0.03	0
Autonomous State Demand Committee	101,808	0.03	0
Akhil Bharatiya Sena	92,210	0.02	0
Hindu Mahasabha	88,214	0.02	0
Federal Party of Manipur	88,179	0.02	0
Bihar People's Party	86,418	0.02	0
Party of Democratic Socialism	81,999	0.02	0
Samata Samaj Party	78,791	0.02	0
Mahabharat People's Party	77,055	0.02	0
Arunachal Congress	76,527	0.02	0
Jharkhand Party	74,364	0.02	0
Jammu and Kashmir National Panthers Party	70,078	0.02	0
Indian Justice Party	67,914	0.02	0
Jharkhand Party (Naren)	67,782	0.02	0
United Minorities Front, Assam	64,657	0.02	0
Labour Party (Secular)	63,989	0.02	0
Rashtriya Swabhimaan Party	58,296	0.01	0
Pragatisheel Manav Samaj Party	54,746	0.01	0
Lok Rajya Party	54,097	0.01	0
Bahujan Kisan Dal	52,669	0.01	0
Majlis Bachao Tahreek	47,560	0.01	0
Peoples Democratic Party	45,720	0.01	0
Uttarakhand Kranti Dal	43,899	0.01	0
Marxist Communist Party of India (S.S. Srivastava)	38,766	0.01	0
Amra Bangali	38,107	0.01	0
Vidharbha Rajya Party	36,974	0.01	0
Urs Samyuktha Paksha	33,128	0.01	0
Ambedkarist Republican Party	31,467	0.01	0
Prabuddha Republican Party	29,792	0.01	0
Rashtravadi Communist Party	28,757	0.01	0
Rashtriya Samajik Nayak Paksha	27,594	0.01	0
Sampurna Vikas Dal	27,135	0.01	0
Tamil Desiyak Katchi	25,348	0.01	0
Kosi Vikas Party	25,258	0.01	0
Chhattisgarhi Samaj Party	24,696	0.01	0
Bharatiya Manavata Vikas Party	24,176	0.01	0
Loktantrik Samajwadi Party	22,811	0.01	0
Savarn Samaj Party	21,246	0.01	0
Ambedkar Samaj Party	20,767	0.01	0
Indian National League	20,159	0.01	0
Bharatiya Gaon Taj Dal	19,909	0.01	0
Akhil Bharatiya Congress Dal (Ambedkar)	19,548	0.01	0
Socialist Party (Lohia)	18,628	0.00	0
Shivrajya Party	18,374	0.00	0
Samajwadi Jan Parishad	17,717	0.00	0
Hindustan Janata Party	17,410	0.00	0
Revolutionary Communist Party of India (Rasik Bhatt)	16,691	0.00	0
Bharatiya Republican Paksha	16,546	0.00	0
Rashtriya Vikas Party	15,159	0.00	0
Trinamool Gana Parishad	14,933	0.00	0
Manuvadi Party	14,233	0.00	0
Bharat Kranti Rakshak Party	12,547	0.00	0
Rashtriya Hamara Dal	12,346	0.00	0
Parivartan Samaj Party	12,273	0.00	0
Bharatiya Eklavya Party	12,197	0.00	0
Proutist Sarva Samaj Party	11,561	0.00	0
Bharatiya Rashtravadi Paksha	11,459	0.00	0
Pachim Banga Rajya Muslim League	10,446	0.00	0
Rajasthan Vikash Party	10,032	0.00	0
Lokpriya Samaj Party	9,913	0.00	0
Bharatiya Jana Sangh	9,707	0.00	0
Rashtriya Krantikari Samajwadi Party	9,145	0.00	0
Vidarbha Janata Congress	9,097	0.00	0
Shoshit Samaj Dal	8,862	0.00	0
Jai Hind Party	8,645	0.00	0
Bharatiya Minorities Suraksha Mahasangh	8,200	0.00	0
Akhil Bharatiya Desh Bhakt Morcha	7,696	0.00	0
Maharashtrawadi Gomantak Party	7,584	0.00	0
Rashtriya Swarn Dal	7,374	0.00	0
Navabharata Nirman Party	7,169	0.00	0
Krantikari Samyavadi Party	6,948	0.00	0
Democratic Bharatiya Samaj Party	6,717	0.00	0
Youth and Students Party	6,580	0.00	0
Ephraim Union	6,512	0.00	0
Akhil Bharatiya Lok Tantrik Alp-Sankhyak Jan Morcha	6,003	0.00	0
United Goans Democratic Party	5,881	0.00	0
Pichhra Samaj Party	5,672	0.00	0
All India Momin Conference	5,113	0.00	0
Labour Party of India (V.V. Prasad)	4,977	0.00	0
All India Minorities Front	4,874	0.00	0
Republican Party of India (Khobragade)	4,790	0.00	0
Naari Shakti Party	4,649	0.00	0
Bahujan Vikas Party	4,533	0.00	0
Bharatiya Ekta Dal	4,312	0.00	0
Shikshit Berozgar Sena	4,303	0.00	0
Yuva Gantantra Party	4,140	0.00	0
Rashtravadi Janata Party	3,737	0.00	0
Kranti Kari Jai Hind Sena	3,393	0.00	0
Mudiraj Rashtriya Samithi	3,345	0.00	0
Sikkim Sangram Parishad	3,216	0.00	0
Janata Vikas Party	3,173	0.00	0
National Students Party	3,069	0.00	0
Secular Party of India	3,041	0.00	0
Vikas Party	2,998	0.00	0
Social Action Party	2,987	0.00	0
Akhil Bharatiya Rashtriya Azad Hind Party	2,801	0.00	0
Loktantrik Chetna Party	2,776	0.00	0
Sikkim Himali Rajya Parishad	2,765	0.00	0
Janmangal Paksh	2,684	0.00	0
Sanatan Samaj Party	2,679	0.00	0
Lok Sewa Dal	2,646	0.00	0
Jana Unnayan Mancha	2,592	0.00	0
Rashtriya Lok Seva Morcha	2,476	0.00	0
Republican Party of India (Democratic)	2,370	0.00	0
Bhartiya Lok Kalyan Dal	2,242	0.00	0
Panchayat Raj Party	2,165	0.00	0
Bharatiya Backward Party	2,162	0.00	0
All Kerala M.G.R. Dravida Munnetra Party	2,158	0.00	0
Akhil Bhartiya Rajarya Sabha	2,080	0.00	0
Bharat Ki Lok Jimmedar Party	2,055	0.00	0
Rashtriya Garima Party	2,043	0.00	0
Rashtriya Garib Dal	1,977	0.00	0
Ekta Krandi Dal U.P.	1,939	0.00	0
Bharatiya Labour Party	1,758	0.00	0
Phule Bharti Lok Party	1,690	0.00	0
Bharatiya Prajatantrik Shudh Gandhiwadi Krishak Dal	1,689	0.00	0
Mool Bharati (S) Party	1,675	0.00	0
Bharatiya Nagrik Party	1,580	0.00	0
Jammu and Kashmir Awami League	1,519	0.00	0
Hind Morcha	1,459	0.00	0
Jharkhand People's Party	1,449	0.00	0
Maharashtra Rajiv Congress	1,399	0.00	0
Janhit Samaj Party	1,310	0.00	0
Vijeta Party	1,304	0.00	0
Socialistic Democratic Party	1,265	0.00	0
Jansatta Party	1,189	0.00	0
Federal Congress of India	1,037	0.00	0
Nidaya Malik (N) Party	1,030	0.00	0
Indian Bahujan Samajwadi Party	972	0.00	0
Desh Bhakt Party	912	0.00	0
Ambedkar National Congress	825	0.00	0
NTR Telugu Desam Party (Lakshmi Parvathi)	759	0.00	0
Akhil Bhartiya Loktantra Party	754	0.00	0
Jebamani Janata	734	0.00	0
Niswarth Sewa Party	730	0.00	0
Jan Chetna Party	671	0.00	0
Hindu Ekta Andolan Party	620	0.00	0
Krantikari Manuwadi Morcha	597	0.00	0
Bharatiya Prajatantra Party	573	0.00	0
Bharatiya Muhabbat Party (All India)	566	0.00	0
Manav Jagriti Manch	552	0.00	0
Bharatiya Janvadi Party	543	0.00	0
Bharatiya Surajya Manch	515	0.00	0
Rashtriya Janadhikar Party	487	0.00	0
Praja Party	485	0.00	0
Bharti Sarvadarshi Parishad	427	0.00	0
Shoshit Samaj Party	395	0.00	0
Rashtriya Sakar Party	379	0.00	0
Bharatiya Sarvkalyan Krantidal	365	0.00	0
Awami Party	327	0.00	0
Swaraj Dal	298	0.00	0
Akhand Bharti	138	0.00	0
Parmarth Party	126	0.00	0
Independents	16,549,900	4.25	5
Nominated Anglo-Indians			2
Total	389,779,784	100.00	545
Valid votes	389,779,784	99.96	
Invalid/blank votes	168,546	0.04	
Total votes	389,948,330	100.00	
Registered voters/turnout	671,487,930	58.07	
Source: ECI

=== Results By Region ===
Region	States	Total Seats	Party	Won	Change
Northern	Jammu & Kashmir (6); Himachal Pradesh (4); Haryana (10); Punjab(13); Uttarakhand(5); Uttar Pradesh (80)	118	Samajwadi Party	36	▲10
Northern	Jammu & Kashmir (6); Himachal Pradesh (4); Haryana (10); Punjab(13); Uttarakhand(5); Uttar Pradesh (80)	118	Indian National Congress	26	▲8
Northern	Jammu & Kashmir (6); Himachal Pradesh (4); Haryana (10); Punjab(13); Uttarakhand(5); Uttar Pradesh (80)	118	Bahujan Samaj Party	19	▲5
Northern	Jammu & Kashmir (6); Himachal Pradesh (4); Haryana (10); Punjab(13); Uttarakhand(5); Uttar Pradesh (80)	118	Bharatiya Janata Party	18	▼22
Northern	Jammu & Kashmir (6); Himachal Pradesh (4); Haryana (10); Punjab(13); Uttarakhand(5); Uttar Pradesh (80)	118	Shiromani Akali Dal	8	▲6
Northern	Jammu & Kashmir (6); Himachal Pradesh (4); Haryana (10); Punjab(13); Uttarakhand(5); Uttar Pradesh (80)	118	Rashtriya Lok Dal	3	▲1
Northern	Jammu & Kashmir (6); Himachal Pradesh (4); Haryana (10); Punjab(13); Uttarakhand(5); Uttar Pradesh (80)	118	Jammu & Kashmir National Conference	2	▼2
Northern	Jammu & Kashmir (6); Himachal Pradesh (4); Haryana (10); Punjab(13); Uttarakhand(5); Uttar Pradesh (80)	118	Jammu and Kashmir Peoples Democratic Party	1	New
Northern	Jammu & Kashmir (6); Himachal Pradesh (4); Haryana (10); Punjab(13); Uttarakhand(5); Uttar Pradesh (80)	118	Janata Dal	1	New
Northern	Jammu & Kashmir (6); Himachal Pradesh (4); Haryana (10); Punjab(13); Uttarakhand(5); Uttar Pradesh (80)	118	National Loktantrik Party	1	▲1
Northern	Jammu & Kashmir (6); Himachal Pradesh (4); Haryana (10); Punjab(13); Uttarakhand(5); Uttar Pradesh (80)	118	Samajwadi Janata Party	1	▲1
Northern	Jammu & Kashmir (6); Himachal Pradesh (4); Haryana (10); Punjab(13); Uttarakhand(5); Uttar Pradesh (80)	118	Independent Politician	2	▲1
Western	Rajasthan (25); Gujarat (26); Maharashtra (48); Goa (2)	101	Bharatiya Janata Party	49	▼2
Western	Rajasthan (25); Gujarat (26); Maharashtra (48); Goa (2)	101	Indian National Congress	30	▲5
Western	Rajasthan (25); Gujarat (26); Maharashtra (48); Goa (2)	101	Shiv Sena	12	▼3
Western	Rajasthan (25); Gujarat (26); Maharashtra (48); Goa (2)	101	Nationalist Congress Party	9	▲3
Western	Rajasthan (25); Gujarat (26); Maharashtra (48); Goa (2)	101	Republican Party of India	1	▲1
Central	Madhya Pradesh (29); Chhattisgarh (11)	40	Bharatiya Janata Party	35	▲6
Central	Madhya Pradesh (29); Chhattisgarh (11)	40	Indian National Congress	5	▼6
Southern	Karnataka (28); Andhra Pradesh (42); Tamil Nadu (39); Kerala (20)	129	Indian National Congress	47	▲14
Southern	Karnataka (28); Andhra Pradesh (42); Tamil Nadu (39); Kerala (20)	129	Bharatiya Janata Party	18	Steady
Southern	Karnataka (28); Andhra Pradesh (42); Tamil Nadu (39); Kerala (20)	129	Dravida Munnetra Kazhagam	16	▲4
Southern	Karnataka (28); Andhra Pradesh (42); Tamil Nadu (39); Kerala (20)	129	Communist Party of India	15	▲6
Southern	Karnataka (28); Andhra Pradesh (42); Tamil Nadu (39); Kerala (20)	129	Communist Party of India	6	▲6
Southern	Karnataka (28); Andhra Pradesh (42); Tamil Nadu (39); Kerala (20)	129	Pattali Makkal Katchi	5	Steady
Southern	Karnataka (28); Andhra Pradesh (42); Tamil Nadu (39); Kerala (20)	129	Telugu Desam Party	5	▼24
Southern	Karnataka (28); Andhra Pradesh (42); Tamil Nadu (39); Kerala (20)	129	Telangana Rashtra Samithi	5	New
Southern	Karnataka (28); Andhra Pradesh (42); Tamil Nadu (39); Kerala (20)	129	Marumalarchi Dravida Munnetra Kazhagam	4	Steady
Southern	Karnataka (28); Andhra Pradesh (42); Tamil Nadu (39); Kerala (20)	129	Janata Dal	3	Steady
Southern	Karnataka (28); Andhra Pradesh (42); Tamil Nadu (39); Kerala (20)	129	Indian Union Muslim League	1	▼1
Southern	Karnataka (28); Andhra Pradesh (42); Tamil Nadu (39); Kerala (20)	129	All India Majlis-e-Ittehadul Muslimeen	1	Steady
Southern	Karnataka (28); Andhra Pradesh (42); Tamil Nadu (39); Kerala (20)	129	Kerala Congress	1	▼1
Southern	Karnataka (28); Andhra Pradesh (42); Tamil Nadu (39); Kerala (20)	129	Indian Federal Democratic Party	1	New
Southern	Karnataka (28); Andhra Pradesh (42); Tamil Nadu (39); Kerala (20)	129	Independent politician	1	▲1
Eastern	Bihar (40); Jharkhand (14); Odisha (21); West Bengal (42)	117	Communist Party of India	26	▲4
Eastern	Bihar (40); Jharkhand (14); Odisha (21); West Bengal (42)	117	Rashtriya Janata Dal	24	▲17
Eastern	Bihar (40); Jharkhand (14); Odisha (21); West Bengal (42)	117	Indian National Congress	17	▲8
Eastern	Bihar (40); Jharkhand (14); Odisha (21); West Bengal (42)	117	Bharatiya Janata Party	13	▼21
Eastern	Bihar (40); Jharkhand (14); Odisha (21); West Bengal (42)	117	Biju Janata Dal	11	▲1
Eastern	Bihar (40); Jharkhand (14); Odisha (21); West Bengal (42)	117	Janata Dal	6	New
Eastern	Bihar (40); Jharkhand (14); Odisha (21); West Bengal (42)	117	Lok Janshakti Party	4	New
Eastern	Bihar (40); Jharkhand (14); Odisha (21); West Bengal (42)	117	Jharkhand Mukti Morcha	5	▲5
Eastern	Bihar (40); Jharkhand (14); Odisha (21); West Bengal (42)	117	Communist Party of India	4	▲1
Eastern	Bihar (40); Jharkhand (14); Odisha (21); West Bengal (42)	117	Revolutionary Socialist Party	3	Steady
Eastern	Bihar (40); Jharkhand (14); Odisha (21); West Bengal (42)	117	All India Forward Bloc	3	▲1
Eastern	Bihar (40); Jharkhand (14); Odisha (21); West Bengal (42)	117	All India Trinamool Congress	1	▼7
North-East	Assam (14); Arunachal Pradesh (2); Meghalaya (2); Manipur (2); Mizoram (1); Nagaland(1); Sikkim(1); Tripura (2)	25	Indian National Congress	11	▼3
North-East	Assam (14); Arunachal Pradesh (2); Meghalaya (2); Manipur (2); Mizoram (1); Nagaland(1); Sikkim(1); Tripura (2)	25	Bharatiya Janata Party	4	▲2
North-East	Assam (14); Arunachal Pradesh (2); Meghalaya (2); Manipur (2); Mizoram (1); Nagaland(1); Sikkim(1); Tripura (2)	25	Communist Party of India	2	Steady
North-East	Assam (14); Arunachal Pradesh (2); Meghalaya (2); Manipur (2); Mizoram (1); Nagaland(1); Sikkim(1); Tripura (2)	25	Asom Gana Parishad	2	▲2
North-East	Assam (14); Arunachal Pradesh (2); Meghalaya (2); Manipur (2); Mizoram (1); Nagaland(1); Sikkim(1); Tripura (2)	25	All India Trinamool Congress	1	New
North-East	Assam (14); Arunachal Pradesh (2); Meghalaya (2); Manipur (2); Mizoram (1); Nagaland(1); Sikkim(1); Tripura (2)	25	Nagaland Peoples Front	1	Steady
North-East	Assam (14); Arunachal Pradesh (2); Meghalaya (2); Manipur (2); Mizoram (1); Nagaland(1); Sikkim(1); Tripura (2)	25	Sikkim Democratic Front	1	Steady
North-East	Assam (14); Arunachal Pradesh (2); Meghalaya (2); Manipur (2); Mizoram (1); Nagaland(1); Sikkim(1); Tripura (2)	25	Mizo National Front	1	New
North-East	Assam (14); Arunachal Pradesh (2); Meghalaya (2); Manipur (2); Mizoram (1); Nagaland(1); Sikkim(1); Tripura (2)	25	Independent politician	2	Steady
Union Territories	Chandigarh (1); Delhi (7); Dadra & Nagar Haveli (1); Daman & Diu (1); Lakshadweep (1); Puducherry (1); Andaman & Nicobar(1)	13	Indian National Congress	9	▲1
Union Territories	Chandigarh (1); Delhi (7); Dadra & Nagar Haveli (1); Daman & Diu (1); Lakshadweep (1); Puducherry (1); Andaman & Nicobar(1)	13	Bharatiya Janata Party	1	▼3
Union Territories	Chandigarh (1); Delhi (7); Dadra & Nagar Haveli (1); Daman & Diu (1); Lakshadweep (1); Puducherry (1); Andaman & Nicobar(1)	13	Janata Dal	1	▲1
Union Territories	Chandigarh (1); Delhi (7); Dadra & Nagar Haveli (1); Daman & Diu (1); Lakshadweep (1); Puducherry (1); Andaman & Nicobar(1)	13	Pattali Makkal Katchi	1	▲1
Union Territories	Chandigarh (1); Delhi (7); Dadra & Nagar Haveli (1); Daman & Diu (1); Lakshadweep (1); Puducherry (1); Andaman & Nicobar(1)	13	Bharatiya Navshakti Party	1	▲1
Total	29 States and 7 UT	543			

==== Summary ====
Region	Total seats	Indian National Congress		Bharatiya Janata Party		Others	
South India	131	48	▲14	18	▼1	65	▼13
West India	78	27	▲10	28	▼7	23	▼3
Hindi-Heartland	225	46	▲12	78	▼34	101	▲22
North-East India	25	11	▼3	4	▲2	13	▲4
East India	63	8	▲3	7	▼4	48	▲1
Union Territories	22	5	▼5	3	Steady	14	▲5
Total	543	145	+31	138	-44	264	+17
Source: Times of India

=== By states and territories ===
The UPA carried 18 states, while the NDA and the Third Front carried 8 and 2 respectively.

Source: Election Commission of India
State/Union Territory	Seats				
State/Union Territory	Seats	UPA	NDA	TFR	OTH
A & N Islands	1	—N/a	1	—N/a	—N/a
Andhra Pradesh	42	34	—N/a	8	—N/a
Arunachal Pradesh	2	2	—N/a	—N/a	—N/a
Assam	14	7	5	—N/a	2
Bihar	40	2	32	—N/a	6
Chandigarh	1	1	1	—N/a	—N/a
Chhattisgarh	11	1	10	—N/a	—N/a
Dadra and Nagar Haveli	1	—N/a	1	—N/a	—N/a
Daman and Diu	1	—N/a	1	—N/a	—N/a
Delhi	7	7	—N/a	—N/a	—N/a
Goa	2	1	1	—N/a	—N/a
Gujarat	26	11	15	—N/a	—N/a
Haryana	10	9	—N/a	1	—N/a
Himachal Pradesh	4	1	3	—N/a	—N/a
Jammu and Kashmir	6	5	—N/a	—N/a	1
Jharkhand	14	3	8	—N/a	3
Karnataka	28	6	19	3	—N/a
Kerala	20	16	—N/a	4	—N/a
Lakshadweep	1	1	—N/a	—N/a	—N/a
Madhya Pradesh	29	12	16	1	—N/a
Maharashtra	48	25	20	—N/a	3
Manipur	2	2	—N/a	—N/a	—N/a
Meghalaya	2	2	—N/a	—N/a	—N/a
Mizoram	1	1	—N/a	—N/a	—N/a
Nagaland	1	—N/a	—N/a	—N/a	1
Orissa	21	6	—N/a	15	—N/a
Puducherry	1	1	—N/a	—N/a	—N/a
Punjab	13	8	5	—N/a	—N/a
Rajasthan	25	20	4	—N/a	1
Sikkim	1	—N/a	—N/a	—N/a	1
Tamil Nadu	39	27	—N/a	12	—N/a
Tripura	2	—N/a	—N/a	2	—N/a
Uttar Pradesh	80	21	15	20	24
Uttarakhand	5	5	—N/a	—N/a	—N/a
West Bengal	42	25	1	15	1
Total	543	262	159	79	43

=== By state and territory ===
==== States ====
State/Union Territory	Seats				
State/Union Territory	Seats	UPA	NDA	TFR	OTH
A & N Islands	1	1	—N/a	—N/a	—N/a
Andhra Pradesh	42	35	5	2	—N/a
Arunachal Pradesh	2	—N/a	2	—N/a	—N/a
Assam	14	11	3	—N/a	2
Bihar	40	29	11	—N/a	—N/a
Chandigarh	1	1	—N/a	—N/a	—N/a
Chhattisgarh	11	1	10	—N/a	—N/a
Dadra and Nagar Haveli	1	—N/a	—N/a	—N/a	1
Daman and Diu	1	1	—N/a	—N/a	—N/a
Delhi	7	6	1	—N/a	—N/a
Goa	2	1	1	—N/a	—N/a
Gujarat	26	12	14	—N/a	—N/a
Haryana	10	9	1	—N/a	—N/a
Himachal Pradesh	4	3	1	—N/a	—N/a
Jammu and Kashmir	6	3	—N/a	—N/a	3
Jharkhand	14	12	1	1	—N/a
Karnataka	28	8	18	2	—N/a
Kerala	20	1	1	18	—N/a
Lakshadweep	1	—N/a	1	—N/a	—N/a
Madhya Pradesh	29	4	25	—N/a	—N/a
Maharashtra	48	23	25	—N/a	—N/a
Manipur	2	1	—N/a	—N/a	1
Meghalaya	2	1	1	—N/a	—N/a
Mizoram	1	—N/a	1	—N/a	—N/a
Nagaland	1	—N/a	1	—N/a	—N/a
Orissa	21	3	18	—N/a	—N/a
Pondicherry	1	1	—N/a	—N/a	—N/a
Punjab	13	2	11	—N/a	—N/a
Rajasthan	25	4	21	—N/a	—N/a
Sikkim	1	—N/a	1	—N/a	—N/a
Tamil Nadu	39	39	—N/a	—N/a	—N/a
Tripura	2	—N/a	—N/a	2	—N/a
Uttar Pradesh	80	9	11	—N/a	61
Uttarakhand	5	1	3	—N/a	1
West Bengal	42	6	1	35	—N/a
Total	543	218	181	60	84

=== Andhra Pradesh (25) ===
Alliance/ Party		Popular vote			Seats		
Alliance/ Party		Votes	%	±pp	Contested	Won	+/−
UPA	INC	1,48,61,984	41.56	▼1.23	34	29	▲24
UPA	TRS	24,41,405	6.83	New	5 + 17	5	▲5
UPA	CPI	4,79,511	1.34	▲0.01	1	1	▲1
UPA	CPI(M)	3,73,148	1.04	▼0.36	1	1	▲1
UPA	Total	1,81,56,048	50.77	Steady	41	36	Steady
NDA	TDP	1,18,44,811	33.12	▼6.73	33	5	▼24
NDA	BJP	30,06,018	8.41	▼1.49	9	0	▼7
NDA	Total	1,48,50,829	41.53	▼8.22	42	5	▼31
AIMIM		4,17,248	1.17	▼0.17	2	1	Steady
Others		8,55,130	2.39	Steady	63	0	Steady
IND		14,83,415	4.15	▲2.74	114	0	Steady
Total		3,57,62,670	100%	-	279	42	-

=== Arunachal Pradesh (2) ===
Alliance/ Party		Popular vote			Seats		
Alliance/ Party		Votes	%	±pp	Contested	Won	+/−
BJP		2,07,286	53.85	▲37.55	2	2	▲2
UPA	AC	76,527	19.88	▲3.26	1	0	Steady
UPA	INC	38,341	9.96	▼46.96	1	0	▼2
UPA	Total	1,14,868	29.84	Steady	2	0	Steady
AITC		6,241	1.62	Steady	1	0	Steady
SP		4,901	1.27	Steady	1	0	Steady
SAP		4,896	1.27	Steady	1	0	Steady
IND		46,736	12.14	Steady	6	0	Steady
Total		3,84,928	100%	-	13	2	-

=== Assam (14) ===
Alliance/ Party		Popular vote			Seats		
Alliance/ Party		Votes	%	±pp	Contested	Won	+/−
INC		36,37,405	35.07	▼3.35	14	9	▼1
NDA	BJP	23,79,524	22.94	▼6.90	12	2	Steady
NDA	IND	6,89,620	6.65	Steady	1	1	▲1
NDA	JD(U)	1,25,966	1.21	Steady	1	0	Steady
NDA	Total	31,95,110	30.80	Steady	14	3	Steady
AGP		20,69,600	19.95	▲8.03	12	2	▲2
CPI		1,72,332	1.66	▲1.08	1	0	Steady
CPI(M-L)L		1,08,837	1.05	▼1.20	3	0	▼1
SP		1,09,088	1.05	▲0.85	4	0	Steady
ASDC		1,01,808	0.98	Steady	1	0	Steady
CPI(M)		68,627	0.66	▼1.11	2	0	Steady
Others		2,07,964	2.00	Steady	19	0	Steady
IND		7,01,318	6.76	▼2.60	46	0	▼1
Total		1,03,72,089	100%	-	116	14	-

=== Bihar (40) ===
Alliance/ Party		Popular vote			Seats		
Alliance/ Party		Votes	%	±pp	Contested	Won	+/−
UPA	RJD	89,94,821	30.67		26	22	▲16
UPA	LJP	24,02,603	8.19		8	4	▲4
UPA	INC	13,15,935	4.49		4	3	▲1
UPA	NCP	2,86,357	0.98		1	0	Steady
UPA	CPI(M)	2,27,298	0.77		1	0	▼1
UPA	Total	1,32,27,014	45.10		40	29	
NDA	JD(U)	65,58,538	22.36		24	6	▼12
NDA	BJP	42,72,195	14.57		16	5	▼7
NDA	Total	1,08,30,733	36.93		40	11	
BSP		10,50,484	3.58		40	0	
CPI(M-L)L		7,05,783	2.41		21	0	
SP		6,84,200	2.33		32	0	
CPI		3,43,926	1.17		6	0	
Others		5,55,749	1.88	Steady	83	0	Steady
IND		19,31,555	6.59		200	0	
Total		2,93,29,444	100%	–	462	40	–

=== Chhattisgarh (11) ===
Party Name	Popular vote			Seats		
Party Name	Votes	%	±pp	Contested	Won	+/−
BJP	34,13,759	47.78	▼0.12	11	10	
INC	28,69,260	40.16	▼3.20	11	1	
Others	5,86,543	8.21	Steady	46	0	Steady
IND	2,75,614	3.86		34	0	Steady
Total	71,45,176	100%	-	102	11	-

=== Gujarat (26) ===
Alliance/ Party		Popular vote			Seats		
Alliance/ Party		Votes	%	±pp	Contested	Won	+/−
BJP		72,04,915	47.37	▼5.11	26	14	▼6
UPA	INC	66,71,926	43.86	▼1.58	25	12	▲6
UPA	NCP	1,76,634	1.16	▲0.64	1	0	Steady
UPA	Total	68,48,560	45.02	Steady	26	12	Steady
Others		6,32,374	4.16	Steady	45	0	Steady
IND		5,25,055	3.45	▲2.78	65	0	Steady
Total		1,52,10,904	100%	-	162	26	-

=== Haryana (10) ===
Party Name	Popular vote			Seats		
Party Name	Votes	%	±pp	Contested	Won	+/−
INC	34,09,950	42.13	▲7.20	10	9	▲9
INLD	18,15,683	22.43	▼6.29	10	0	▼5
BJP	13,93,106	17.21	▼12.00	10	1	▼4
HVP	5,06,122	6.25	▲3.54	9	0	
BSP	4,03,254	4.98	▲3.02	10	0	
SP	1,37,050	1.69		6	0	
ESP	1,26,924	1.57		3	0	
Others	51,876	0.63	Steady	26	0	Steady
IND	2,49,413	3.08		76	0	Steady
Total	80,93,378	100%	-	160	10	-

=== Himachal Pradesh (4) ===
Party Name	Popular vote			Seats		
Party Name	Votes	%	±pp	Contested	Won	+/−
INC	12,94,988	51.89	▲12.37	4	3	▲3
BJP	11,04,066	44.24	▼2.03	4	1	▼2
BSP	43,475	1.74	▲1.43	4	0	Steady
SP	7,092	0.28	▲0.19	1	0	Steady
JD(S)	4,453	0.18	▼0.01	1	0	Steady
IND	41,412	1.66	▲1.18	9	0	Steady
Total	24,95,486	100%	-	23	4	-

=== Jammu and Kashmir (6) ===
Alliance/ Party		Popular vote			Seats		
Alliance/ Party		Votes	%	±pp	Contested	Won	+/−
UPA	INC	6,23,182	27.83	▲10.00	2 + 1	2	▲2
UPA	JKPDP	2,67,457	11.94	Steady	2 + 1	1	▲1
UPA	Total	8,90,639	39.77	Steady	4 + 2	3	Steady
JKNC		4,93,067	22.02	▼6.92	6	2	▼2
BJP		5,15,965	23.04	▼8.52	6	0	▼2
JKNPP		67,619	3.02	▲2.14	4	0	Steady
BSP		49,754	2.22	▼2.62	3	0	Steady
Others		56,946	2.55	Steady	21	0	Steady
IND		1,65,352	7.38	▼2.25	37	1	Steady
Total		22,39,342	100%	-	83	6	-

=== Jharkhand (14) ===
Alliance/ Party		Popular vote			Seats		
Alliance/ Party		Votes	%	±pp	Contested	Won	+/−
UPA	INC	20,07,334	21.44	▼2.34	6 + 3	6	▲4
UPA	JMM	15,23,976	16.28	▲6.75	3 + 2	4	▲4
UPA	RJD	3,28,197	3.51	▼3.97	1 + 1	2	▲1
UPA	CPI	3,56,058	3.80	▲1.19	1	1	▲1
UPA	Total	42,15,565	45.03	Steady	11 + 6	13	Steady
NDA	BJP	30,90,365	33.01	▼12.52	14	1	▼10
JD(U)		3,56,106	3.80	Steady	5	0	Steady
BSP		2,19,247	2.34	▲1.35	14	0	Steady
CPI(M-L)L		2,02,343	2.16	▲1.20	8	0	Steady
AJSU		1,57,930	1.69	Steady	5	0	Steady
MCC		1,47,470	1.58	▼3.06	1	0	Steady
Others		3,27,640	3.50	Steady	47	0	Steady
IND		6,44,647	6.89	▲6.30	71	0	Steady
Total		93,61,313	100%	-	182	14	-

=== Karnataka (28) ===
Alliance/ Party		Popular vote			Seats		
Alliance/ Party		Votes	%	±pp	Contested	Won	+/−
NDA	BJP	87,32,783	34.77	▲7.58	24	18	▲11
NDA	JD(U)	4,68,682	1.87	▼11.41	4	0	▼3
NDA	Total	92,01,465	36.64	Steady	28	18	Steady
INC		92,47,605	36.82	▼8.59	28	8	▼10
JD(S)		51,35,205	20.45	▲9.60	28	2	▲2
Others		15,30,384	6.09	Steady	48	0	Steady
IND		5,88,117	2.34	▲0.53	40	0	Steady
Total		2,51,14,659	100%	-	172	28	-

=== Kerala (20) ===
Alliance/Party		Popular vote			Seats		
Alliance/Party		Votes	%	±pp	Contested	Won	+/−
LDF	CPI(M)	4,754,567	31.52%	▲3.62%	13	12	▲3
LDF	CPI	1,190,526	7.89%	▲0.29%	4	3	▲3
LDF	KC(J)	353,905	2.35%	▼0.05%	1	1	Steady
LDF	JD(S)	340,111	2.25%	▲0.05%	1	1	▲1
LDF	LDF Ind.	323,042	2.14%	New	1	1	▲1
LDF	Total	6,962,151	46.15%	▲2.45%	20	18	▲9
UDF	INC	4,846,637	32.13%	▼7.27%	17	0	▼8
UDF	IUML	733,228	4.86%	▼0.44%	2	1	▼1
UDF	KC(M)	209,880	1.39%	▼0.91%	1	0	▼1
UDF	Total	5,789,745	38.38%	▼8.52%	20	1	▼10
NDA	BJP	1,566,569	10.38%	▲3.78%	19	0	Steady
NDA	IFDP	380,847	1.70%	New	1	1	New
NDA	Total	1,947,416	12.08%	▲4.18%	20	1	▲1
Others		387,116	3.39%				
Total		15,086,428	100%			20	

=== Madhya Pradesh (29) ===
Parties and coalitions	Seats			Popular vote		
Parties and coalitions	Contested	Won	+/−	Votes	%	±pp
Bharatiya Janata Party	29	25	▲4	88,84,913	48.13%	▲4.02%
Indian National Congress	29	4	▼4	62,89,013	34.07%	▼10.04%
Bahujan Samaj Party	28	0	-	8,76,871	4.75%	▼0.56%
Samajwadi Party	29	0	-	5,90,090	3.2%	▲1.41%
Gondwana Ganatantra Party	15	0	-	5,63,676	3.05%	▲2.81%
Communist Party of India	2	0	-	43,462	0.24%	-
Independents	124	0	-	7,42,198	4.02%	-
Total	29			1,84,59,240		

=== Maharashtra (48) ===
Alliance/ Party		Popular vote			Seats		
Alliance/ Party		Votes	%	±pp	Contested	Won	+/−
NDA	BJP	77,45,290	22.61	▲1.43	26	13	Steady
NDA	SHS	68,88,306	20.11	▲3.25	22	12	▼3
NDA	Total	1,46,33,596	42.72	▲4.68	48	25	▼3
UPA	INC	81,43,246	23.77	▼5.94	26	13	▲3
UPA	NCP	62,71,036	18.31	▼3.27	18	9	▲3
UPA	RPI(A)	3,47,215	1.01	▼0.54	1	1	▲1
UPA	RPI	1,50,902	0.44	▼1.00	1	0	Steady
UPA	JD(S)	2,13,731	0.62	▼0.29	1	0	Steady
UPA	PRP	2,37,937	0.69	Steady	1	0	Steady
UPA	Total	1,53,64,067	44.84	▼13.66**	48	23	▲7
Others		29,21,787	8.54	Steady	165	0	Steady
IND		13,33,828	3.89	▲2.17	151	0	Steady
Total		3,42,53,278	100%	-	412	48	-

=== Manipur (2) ===
Party Name	Popular vote			Seats		
Party Name	Votes	%	±pp	Contested	Won	+/−
BJP	2,13,892	20.65	▲19.63	2	0	Steady
INC	1,54,055	14.88	▼10.41	1	1	▲1
NCP	1,07,435	10.37	▼3.12	1	0	▼1
CPI	1,04,722	10.11	▲6.16	1	0	Steady
FPM	88,179	8.52	▲5.16	1	0	Steady
MPP	77,055	7.44	Steady	1	0	Steady
JD(U)	37,455	3.62	▲0.43	1	0	Steady
AITC	20,131	1.94	Steady	1	0	Steady
IND	2,32,633	22.46	▲15.83	3	1	▲1
Total	10,35,557	100%	-	12	2	-

=== Punjab (13) ===
Alliance/ Party		Popular vote			Seats		
Alliance/ Party		Votes	%	±pp	Contested	Won	+/−
NDA	SAD	35,06,681	34.28	▲5.69	10	8	▲6
NDA	BJP	10,71,650	10.48	▲1.32	3	3	▲2
NDA	Total	45,78,331	44.76	Steady	13	11	Steady
UPA	INC	34,95,187	34.17	▼4.27	11	2	▼6
UPA	CPI	2,60,752	2.55	▼1.19	1	0	▼1
UPA	CPI(M)	1,85,444	1.81	▼0.37	1	0	Steady
UPA	Total	39,41,383	38.53	Steady	13	2	Steady
BSP		7,84,454	7.67	▲3.83	13	0	Steady
SAD(A)		3,87,682	3.79	▲0.38	6	0	▼1
LBP		1,87,787	1.84	Steady	1	0	Steady
Others		67,827	0.67	Steady	26	0	Steady
IND		2,81,608	2.75	▲0.30	70	0	Steady
Total		1,02,29,072	100%	-	142	13	-

=== Rajasthan (25) ===
Party Name	Popular vote			Seats		
Party Name	Votes	%	±pp	Contested	Won	+/−
BJP	84,94,488	49.01		25	21	
INC	71,79,939	41.42		25	4	
BSP	5,48,297	3.16		24	0	
LJP	1,11,696	0.64		1	0	
INLD	90,320	0.52		5	0	
CPI(M)	89,042	0.51		2	0	
JD(U)	78,556	0.45		1	0	
CPI	64,347	0.37		2	0	
SP	51,505	0.30		10	0	
NCP	35,802	0.21		2	0	
CPI(M-L)L	28,839	0.17		2	0	
Others	88,328	0.51	Steady	17	0	Steady
IND	4,71,289	2.72		69	0	Steady
Total	1,73,32,448	100%	-	185	25	-

=== Tamil Nadu (39) ===
Party Name		Popular vote			Seats	
Party Name		Votes	%	±pp	Won	+/−
UPA	DMK	7,064,393	24.60%	▲1.47%	16	▲4
UPA	INC	4,134,255	14.40%	▲3.30%	10	▲8
UPA	PMK	1,927,367	6.71%	▼1.50%	5	Steady
UPA	MDMK	1,679,870	5.95%	▼0.10%	4	Steady
UPA	CPI	852,981	2.97%	▲0.41%	2	▲2
UPA	CPI(M)	824,524	2.87%	▲0.52%	2	▲1
UPA	Total	16,483,390	57.50%	▲4.10%	39	▲15
NDA	AIADMK	8,547,014	29.77%	▲3.05%	0	▼10
NDA	BJP	1,455,899	5.07%	▼2.07%	0	▼4
NDA	Total	10,002,913	34.84%	▲0.98%	0	▼14
Independents		947,938	3.30%	▲2.05%	0	Steady
Other Parties (13 parties)		2,228,212	4.36%	▼7.13%	0	▼1
Total		28,714,515	100.00%	Steady	39	Steady

=== Uttar Pradesh (80) ===
Alliance/ Party		Popular vote			Seats		
Alliance/ Party		Votes	%	±pp	Contested	Won	+/−
SP+	SP	1,42,43,280	26.74	▲2.68	68	35	▲9
SP+	RLD	23,91,825	4.49	▲2.00	10	3	▲1
SP+	Total	1,66,35,105	31.23	Steady	78	38	Steady
BSP		1,31,39,200	24.67	▲2.59	80	19	▲5
NDA	BJP	1,18,10,187	22.17	▼5.47	77	10	▼19
NDA	JD(U)	4,25,460	0.80	▲0.21	3	1	▲1
NDA	Total	1,22,35,647	22.97	Steady	80	11	Steady
INC+	INC	64,12,293	12.04	▼2.68	73	9	▼1
INC+	LJP	1,50,545	0.28	Steady	3	0	Steady
INC+	Total	65,62,838	12.32	Steady	76	9	Steady
NLP		3,20,407	0.60	▲0.37	7	1	▲1
SJP(R)		2,71,563	0.51	▲0.05	2	1	Steady
AD		7,24,475	1.36	▼0.19	57	0	Steady
SBSP		2,58,628	0.49	Steady	13	0	Steady
Others		10,90,270	2.01	Steady	264	0	Steady
IND		20,31,483	3.81	▲0.19	481	1	▲1
Total		5,32,69,616	100%	-	1138	80	-

=== Uttarakhand (5) ===
Party Name	Popular vote			Seats		
Party Name	Votes	%	±pp	Contested	Won	+/−
BJP	10,95,316	40.98	▲1.36	5	3	▼1
INC	10,24,062	38.31	▲0.17	5	1	Steady
SP	2,12,085	7.93	▲1.75	5	1	▲1
BSP	1,80,885	6.77	▼5.60	3	0	Steady
UKKD	43,899	1.64	▲1.13	4	0	Steady
Others	40,530	1.51	Steady	14	0	Steady
IND	76,094	2.85	▲1.32	18	0	Steady
Total	26,72,871	100%	-	54	5	-

=== West Bengal (42) ===
Alliance/ Party		Popular vote			Seats		
Alliance/ Party		Votes	%	±pp	Contested	Won	+/−
LF	CPI(M)	1,42,71,042	38.57	▲3.00	32	26	▲5
LF	RSP	16,58,787	4.48	▲0.23	4	3	Steady
LF	CPI	14,84,152	4.01	▲0.54	3	3	Steady
LF	AIFB	13,52,423	3.66	▲0.21	3	3	▲1
LF	Total	1,87,66,404	50.72	▲3.98	42	35	▲6
NDA	AITC	77,86,178	21.04	▼5.00	29	1	▼7
NDA	BJP	29,83,950	8.06	▼3.07	13	0	▼2
NDA	Total	1,07,70,128	29.10	▼8.07	42	1	▼9
UPA	INC	53,85,754	14.56	▲1.27	37	6	▲3
UPA	PDS	81,999	0.22	Steady	2	0	Steady
UPA	JMM	56,429	0.15	▲0.09	1 + 1	0	Steady
UPA	IND	1,72,750	0.47	Steady	2	0	Steady
UPA	Total	56,96,932	15.40	Steady	42 + 1	6	Steady
Others		7,33,549	2.00	Steady	84	0	Steady
IND		10,33,220	2.79	▲0.90	144	0	Steady
Total		3,70,00,233	100%	-	355	42	-

==== Party Wise Results ====
State	Total seats	Seats won												
State	Total seats	INC	BJP	CPM	SP	RJD	BSP	DMK	SHS	BJD	CPI	NCP	IND	OTH
Andhra Pradesh	42	29		1							1			11
Arunachal Pradesh	2		2											
Assam	14	9	2										1	2
Bihar	40	3	5			22								10
Goa	2	1	1											
Gujarat	26	12	14											
Haryana	10	9	1											
Himachal Pradesh	4	3	1											
Jammu and Kashmir	6	2											1	3
Karnataka	28	8	18											2
Kerala	20			12							3		1	4
Madhya Pradesh	29	4	25											
Maharashtra	48	13	13						12			9		1
Manipur	2	1											1	
Meghalaya	2	1												1
Mizoram	1													1
Nagaland	1													1
Orissa	21	2	7							11				1
Punjab	13	2	3											8
Rajasthan	25	4	21											
Sikkim	1													1
Tamil Nadu	39	10		2				16			2			9
Tripura	2			2										
Uttar Pradesh	80	9	10		35		19						1	6
West Bengal	42	6		26							3			7
Chhattisgarh	11	1	10											
Jharkhand	14	6	1			2					1			4
Uttaranchal	5	1	3		1									
A & N Islands	1	1												
Chandigarh	1	1												
D & N Haveli	1													1
Daman and Diu	1	1												
Delhi	7	6	1											
Lakshadweep	1													1
Pondicherry	1													1
Total	543	145	138	43	36	24	19	16	12	11	10	9	5	75

==== Territories ====
Territories	Party	Seats won	% of Votes	Alliance
Andaman & Nicobar Islands	Indian National Congress	1	55.77	United Progressive Alliance
Andaman & Nicobar Islands	Bharatiya Janata Party	0	35.95	National Democratic Alliance
Andaman & Nicobar Islands	Communist Party of India (Marxist)	0	2.71	Left Front
Andaman & Nicobar Islands	Independent	0	1.72	None
Andaman & Nicobar Islands	Others	0	3.85	None
Chandigarh	Indian National Congress	1	52.06	United Progressive Alliance
Chandigarh	Bharatiya Janata Party	0	35.22	National Democratic Alliance
Chandigarh	Indian National Lok Dal	0	6.61	None
Chandigarh	Independent	0	3.42	None
Chandigarh	Others	0	2.69	None
National Capital Territory of Delhi	Indian National Congress	6	54.81	United Progressive Alliance
National Capital Territory of Delhi	Bharatiya Janata Party	1	40.67	National Democratic Alliance
National Capital Territory of Delhi	Bahujan Samaj Party	0	2.48	None
National Capital Territory of Delhi	Independent	0	1.27	None
Lakshadweep	Janata Dal (United)	1	49.02	National Democratic Alliance
Lakshadweep	Indian National Congress	0	48.79	United Progressive Alliance
Lakshadweep	Janata Party	0	1.47	None
Lakshadweep	Samajwadi Party	0	0.72	None

== Analysis ==
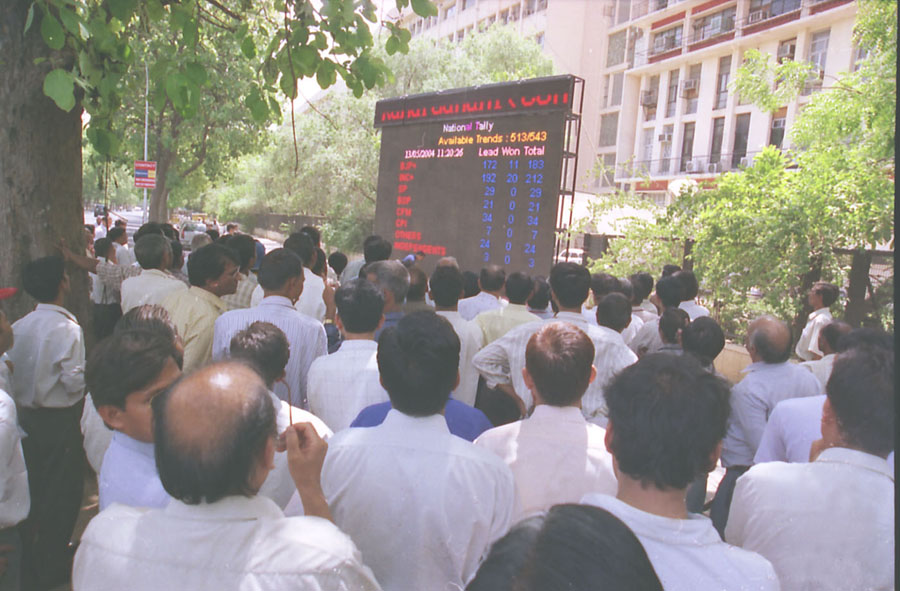
A crowd watches live results on an electronic billboard in New Delhi on 13 May

Though pre-poll predictions were for an overwhelming majority for the BJP, the exit polls (immediately after the elections and before the counting began) predicted a hung parliament. However, even the exit polls could only indicate the general trend and nowhere close to the final figures. There is also the general perception that as soon as the BJP started realising that events might not proceed entirely in its favour, it changed the focus of its campaign from India Shining to issues of stability. Congress was regarded as old-fashioned by the ruling NDA and many. But Congress declared that it has largely backing of poor, rural, lower-caste and minority voters though all sections of the society had participated in the economic boom of Vajpayee's years. The BJP declared that, PV Narasimha Rao's govt had created a wealthy middle class. But Congress achieved its victory on grounds of coalition politics.

== Impact ==
The rout of the ruling parties in the states of Tamil Nadu and Kerala in the general elections led to calls for the dissolution of the governments of these states.

The stock market (Bombay Stock Exchange) fell in the week prior to the announcement of the results due to fears of the defeat of NDA government and stoppage of its economic reforms. As soon as counting began, however, it became clear that the Congress coalition was headed for a sizeable lead over the NDA and the market surged, only to crash the following day when the left parties, whose support would be required for government formation, announced that it was their intention to do away with the disinvestment ministry. Following this, Manmohan Singh, the Prime Minister (in office 2004–14) and the prime architect of the economic liberalisation of the early 1990s, hurried to reassure investors that the new government would strive to create a business-friendly climate. Later in his Book, Turning Points Former president Abdul Kalam said that he has no objection against Sonia's candidacy and he said to ready the documents with Sonia as Prime Minister.

== Events ==
- 13 May - Congress wins a minority of seats in the Lok Sabha (142) and forms UPA which has plurality of seats (219 seats against 188 for the BJP). This event shocks many.
- 13 May - Counting of votes in the parliamentary elections begins.
- 11 May - Congress wins the Assembly elections in Andhra Pradesh by 2/3 majority.
- 10 May - The fourth and final phase of elections comes to an end. Results will come out for 542 of the 543 parliament seats with elections to be held again in Chhapra.
- 5 May - Third phase of polling comes to an end with the ruling coalition government gaining seats according to exit polls but still off the victory target. Reports of booth capturing in Chhapra, capture headlines.
- 26 April - Second phase of elections sees 55-60% polling. This is the final phase for assembly elections. Polling covers 136 parliamentary constituencies in 11 states. The share market starts to crash as the investors suspected that the NDA government might find it hard to come back to power—raising doubts about the continuation of economic reforms initiated by the NDA government.
- 22 April - Tripura, where polling was delayed because of a local holiday, votes for its two MPs. A turnout of close to 60% is reported, despite calls for abstention made by separatists.
- 20 April - The first phase of the vote is held, with average turnouts of between 50% and 55%. Voting is reported as brisk, and the day unfolds relatively smoothly, albeit with some glitches reported with the electronic voting machines. Isolated violent incidents take place in Kashmir, Jammu, Manipur, and Jharkhand.
- 8 April - The NDA's top leaders meet in New Delhi to adopt its manifesto for the elections, Agenda for Development and Good Governance.
- 7 April - Prime Minister Shri Atal Bihari Bajpayee files nomination as the candidate from his seat Lucknow.
- 6 April - The BJP and the All India Anna Dravida Munnetra Kazhagam (AIADMK) tell the Election Commission that they will continue to raise the issue of the foreign origin of Congress president Sonia Gandhi.
- 4 April - An FIR is lodged against external affairs minister Yashwant Sinha for alleged violation of election code of conduct during a poll meeting in Ranchi. Besides Sinha, FIRs were lodged against three other BJP leaders who participated in the meeting. All were acquitted.

== See also ==
- List of members of the 14th Lok Sabha
- 2004 elections in India
- Election Commission of IndiaCategory:2004 Indian general election by state or union territory
