= Elections in Arunachal Pradesh =

Elections in Arunachal Pradesh are being conducted since 1977 to elect the members of Arunachal Pradesh Legislative Assembly and the members of the Lok Sabha. There are 60 Legislative Assembly constituencies and 2 Lok Sabha constituencies in the state.

== Legislative Assembly elections ==
The elections for the Arunachal Pradesh Legislative Assembly held since 1978.

Elections	Assembly Term	Winning Party/Coalition	Chief Minister
1978	First Assembly	Janata Party	Prem Khandu Thungan
1980	Second Assembly	Indian National Congress	Gegong Apang
1984	Third Assembly	Indian National Congress	Gegong Apang
1990	Fourth Assembly	Indian National Congress	Gegong Apang
1995	Fifth Assembly	Indian National Congress	Gegong Apang
1999	Sixth Assembly	Indian National Congress	Mukut Mithi
2004	Seventh Assembly	Indian National Congress	Gegong Apang
2009	Eighth Assembly	Indian National Congress	Dorjee Khandu
2014	Ninth Assembly	Indian National Congress	Nabam Tuki
2019	Tenth Assembly	Bharatiya Janta Party	Pema Khandu
2024	Eleventh Assembly	Bharatiya Janta Party	Pema Khandu

== Lok Sabha elections ==
The elections for the Lok Sabha seats in Arunachal Pradesh held since 1977.

Year	Lok Sabha Term	Arunachal West	Arunachal East
1977	Sixth Lok Sabha	Indian National Congress	Independent
1980	Seventh Lok Sabha	Indian National Congress	Indian National Congress
1984	Eighth Lok Sabha	Indian National Congress	Indian National Congress
1989	Ninth Lok Sabha	Indian National Congress	Indian National Congress
1991	Tenth Lok Sabha	Indian National Congress	Indian National Congress
1996	Eleventh Lok Sabha	Independent	Independent
1998	Twelfth Lok Sabha	Arunachal Congress	Arunachal Congress
1999	Thirteenth Lok Sabha	Indian National Congress	Indian National Congress
2004	Fourteenth Lok Sabha	Bharatiya Janata Party	Bharatiya Janata Party
2009	Fifteenth Lok Sabha	Indian National Congress	Indian National Congress
2014	Sixteenth Lok Sabha	Bharatiya Janata Party	Indian National Congress
2019	Seventeenth Lok Sabha	Bharatiya Janata Party	Bharatiya Janata Party
2024	Eighteenth Lok Sabha	Bharatiya Janata Party	Bharatiya Janata Party
