= 2004 Indian general election in Delhi =

2004 Indian general election in the National Capital Territory of Delhi
- 10 May 2004

7 seats
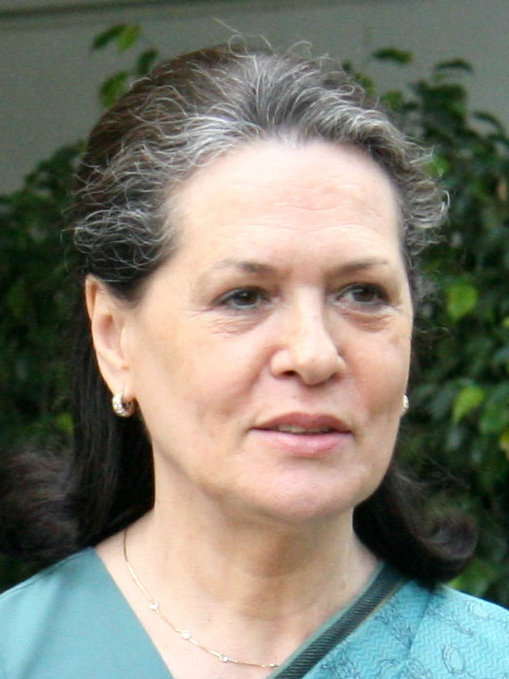

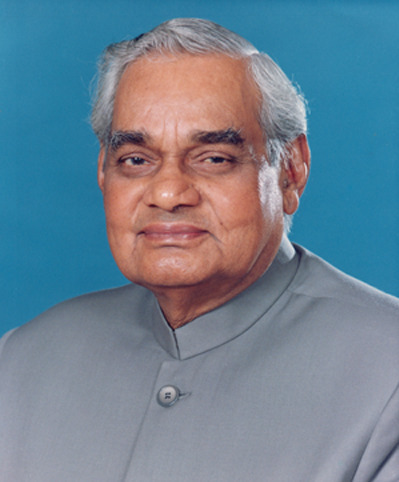
	First party	Second party
Leader	Sonia Gandhi	Atal Bihari Vajpayee
Party	INC	BJP
Seats won	6	1
Seat change	▲6	▼6
Popular vote	2,261,199	1,677,833
Percentage	54.80%	40.66%
Swing	▲12.84pp	▼11.09pp
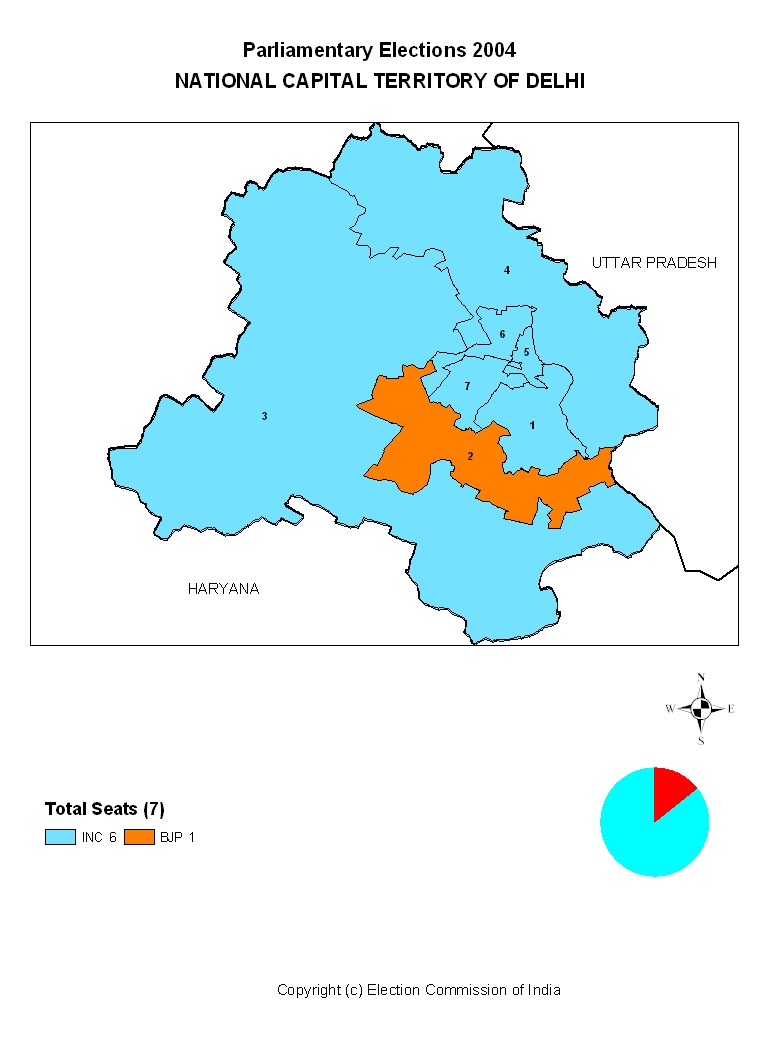
- Delhi
Prime Minister before election
A. B. Vajpayee
BJP
Prime Minister after election
Manmohan Singh
INC

The 2004 Indian general election in Delhi, occurred for 7 seats in the state.

== Schedule ==
Event	Date
Date for Nominations	16 April 2004
Last Date for filing Nominations	23 April 2004
Date for scrutiny of nominations	24 April 2004
Last date for withdrawal of candidatures	26 April 2004
Date of poll	10 May 2004
Date of counting	13 May 2004

== Parties and alliances ==
=== National Democratic Alliance ===
No.	Party	Flag	Symbol	Leader	Seats contested
1.	Bharatiya Janata Party			A. B. Vajpayee	7

=== United Progressive Alliance ===
No.	Party	Flag	Symbol	Leader	Seats contested
1.	Indian National Congress			Sonia Gandhi	7

== List of Candidates ==
Constituency					
Constituency		UPA		NDA	
1	New Delhi	INC	Ajay Makan	BJP	Jagmohan
2	South Delhi	INC	R. K. Anand	BJP	Vijay Kumar Malhotra
3	Outer Delhi	INC	Sajjan Kumar	BJP	Sahib Singh
4	East Delhi	INC	Sandeep Dikshit	BJP	Lal Bihari Tiwari
5	Chandni Chowk	INC	Kapil Sibal	BJP	Smriti Irani
6	Delhi Sadar	INC	Jagdish Tytler	BJP	Vijay Goel
7	Karol Bagh	INC	Krishna Tirath	BJP	Anita Arya

== Results by Party ==
Party Name	Popular vote			Seats		
Party Name	Votes	%	±pp	Contested	Won	+/−
INC	22,61,199	54.81	▲12.85	7	6	▲6
BJP	16,77,833	40.67	▼11.08	7	1	▼6
BSP	1,02,269	2.48	▲0.24	7	0	Steady
Others	32,209	0.78	Steady	38	0	Steady
IND	52,322	1.27	▼0.41	70	0	Steady
Total	41,25,832	100%	-	129	7	-

== List of Elected MPs ==
Constituency		Winner				Runner-up				Margin	
Constituency		Candidate	Party	Votes	%	Candidate	Party	Votes	%	Votes	%
1	New Delhi	Ajay Maken	INC	105,415	52.04	Jagmohan	BJP	92,631	45.73	12,784	6.31
2	South Delhi	Vijay Kumar Malhotra	BJP	240,654	50.25	R. K. Anand	INC	224,649	46.91	16,005	3.34
3	Outer Delhi	Sajjan Kumar	INC	855,543	55.06	Sahib Singh Verma	BJP	631,753	40.66	223,790	14.40
4	East Delhi	Sandeep Dikshit	INC	669,527	56.22	Lal Bihari Tiwari	BJP	439,748	36.93	229,779	19.30
5	Chandni Chowk	Kapil Sibal	INC	127,396	71.17	Smriti Z. Iraani	BJP	47,981	26.80	79,415	44.36
6	Delhi Sadar	Jagdish Tytler	INC	140,073	51.58	Vijay Goel	BJP	124,099	45.70	15,974	5.88
7	Karol Bagh (SC)	Krishna Tirath	INC	138,596	55.62	Anita Arya	BJP	100,967	40.52	37,629	15.10

== Post-election Union Council of Ministers from Delhi ==
#	Name	Constituency	Designation	Department	From	To	Party
1	Kapil Sibal	Chandni Chowk	MoS(I/C)	Science and Technology	23 May 2004	29 Jan 2006	INC
1	Kapil Sibal	Chandni Chowk	MoS(I/C)	Ocean Development	23 May 2004	29 Jan 2006	INC
1	Kapil Sibal	Chandni Chowk	Cabinet Minister	Science and Technology	29 Jan 2006	22 May 2009	INC
1	Kapil Sibal	Chandni Chowk	Cabinet Minister	Ocean Development	29 Jan 2006	12 July 2006	INC
1	Kapil Sibal	Chandni Chowk	Cabinet Minister	Earth Sciences	12 July 2006	22 May 2009	INC
2	Jagdish Tytler	Delhi Sadar	MoS(I/C)	Non-Resident Indian Affairs	23 May 2004	9 Sept 2004	INC
2	Jagdish Tytler	Delhi Sadar	MoS(I/C)	Overseas Indian Affairs	9 Sept 2004	10 Aug 2005	INC
3	Ajay Maken	New Delhi	MoS	Urban Development	29 Jan 2006	22 May 2009	INC

== Assembly segment wise lead of parties ==
Party	Assembly segments	Position in Assembly (as of 2008 election)
Indian National Congress	67	43
Bharatiya Janata Party	16	23
Total	70	

== See also ==
- Indian general election, 2004 (Jammu and Kashmir)
