= 2004 Indian general election in Haryana =

- 10 May 2004

10 seats
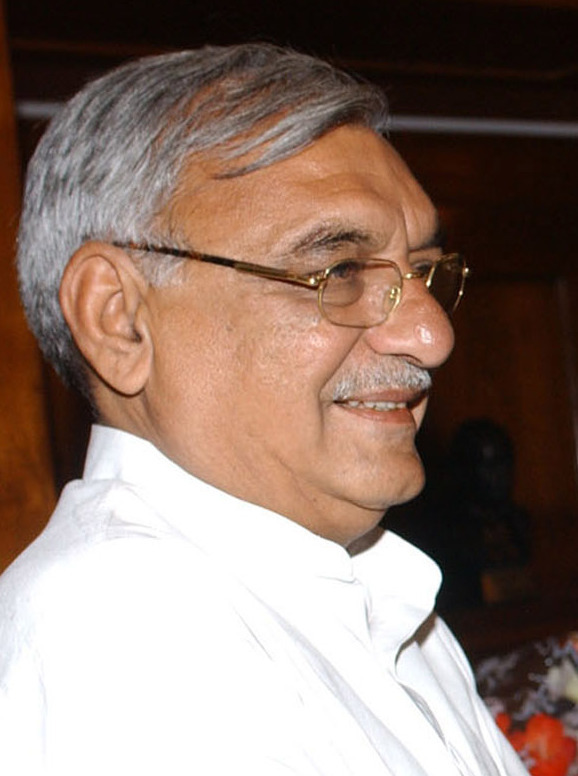

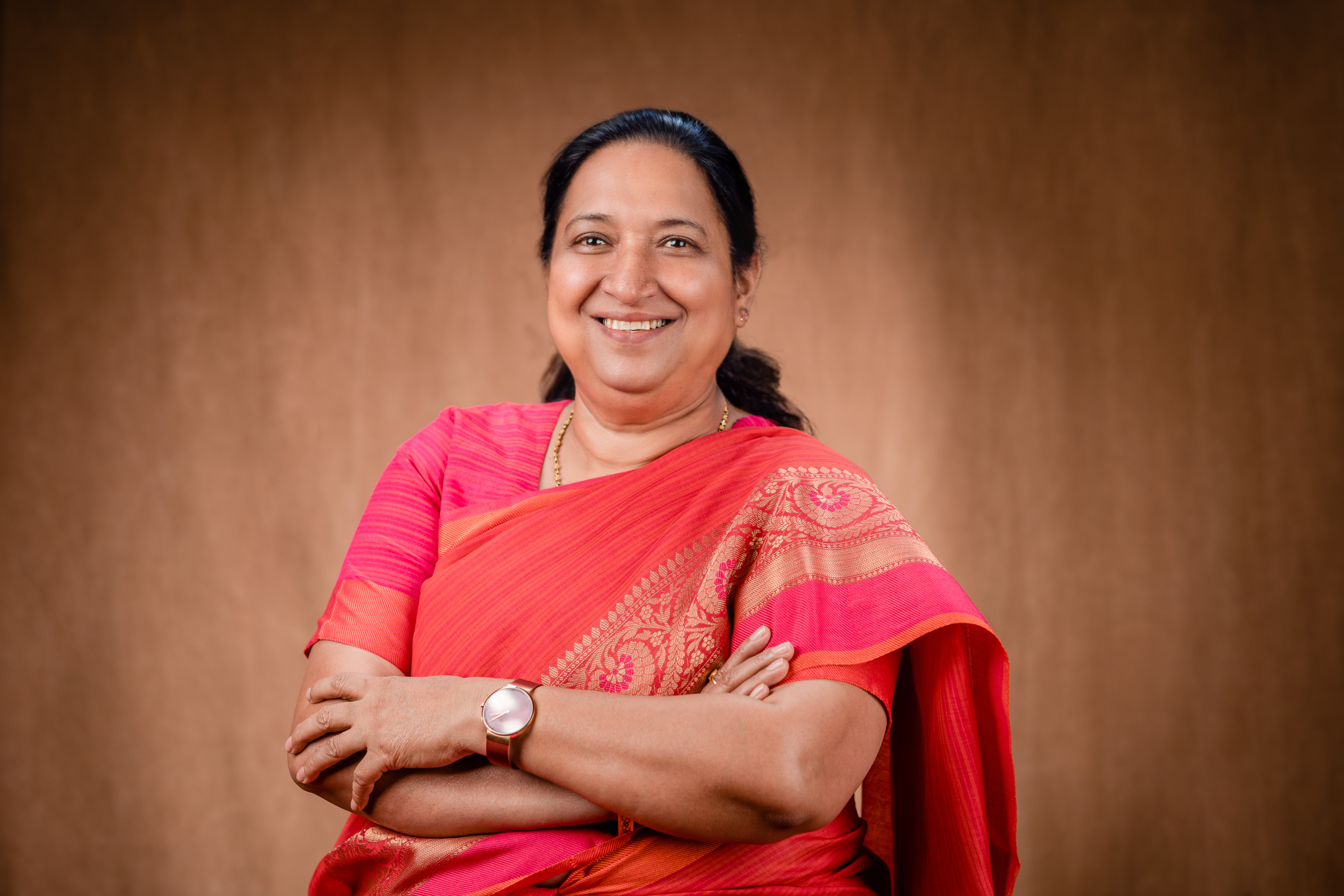

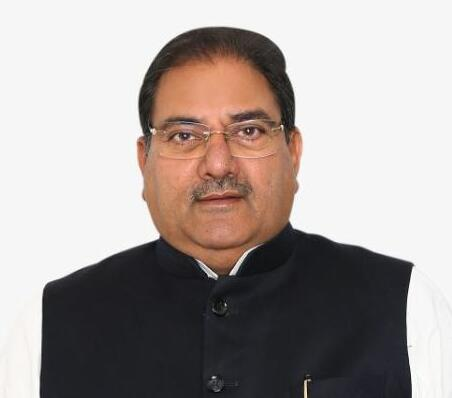
	First party	Second party	Third party
Leader	Bhupinder Singh Hooda	Sudha Yadav	Abhay Singh Chautala
Party	INC	BJP	INLD
Leader's seat	Rohtak	Mahendragarh (lost)	Kurukshetra (lost)
Last election	0	5	5
Seats won	9	1	0
Seat change	▲9	▼4	▼5
Percentage	42.13%	17.21%	22.43%
Swing	▲7.9%	▼11.9%	▼6.29%
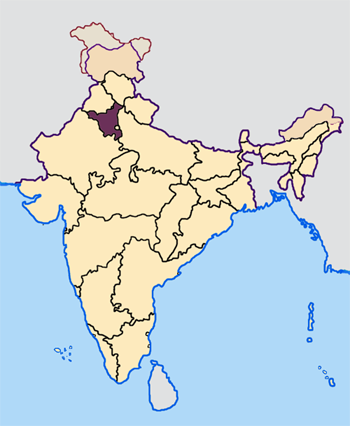
- Haryana
Prime Minister before election
A. B. Vajpayee
BJP
Prime Minister after election
Manmohan Singh
INC

The 2004 Indian general election occurred in Haryana for 10 seats.

== Schedule ==
Event	Date
Date for Nominations	16 April 2004
Last Date for filing Nominations	23 April 2004
Date for scrutiny of nominations	24 April 2004
Last date for withdrawal of candidatures	26 April 2004
Date of poll	10 May 2004
Date of counting	13 May 2004

== Parties and alliances ==
=== National Democratic Alliance ===
No.	Party	Flag	Symbol	Leader	Seats contested
1.	Bharatiya Janata Party			Ganeshi Lal	10

=== Indian National Lok Dal ===
No.	Party	Flag	Symbol	Leader	Seats contested
1.	Indian National Lok Dal			Om Prakash Chautala	10

=== United Progressive Alliance ===
No.	Party	Flag	Symbol	Leader	Seats contested
1.	Indian National Congress			Bhajan Lal Bishnoi	10

=== Haryana Vikas Party ===
No.	Party	Flag	Symbol	Leader	Seats contested
1.	Haryana Vikas Party			Bansi Lal	9

== List of Candidates ==
Constituency		BJP		INLD		INC		HVP	
No.	Name	Party	Candidate	Party	Candidate	Party	Candidate	Party	Candidate
1	Ambala (SC)	BJP	Rattan Lal Kataria	INLD	Balwant Singh	INC	Selja Kumari	HVP	Aman Kumar Nagra
2	Kurukshetra	BJP	Gurdayal Singh Saini	INLD	Abhay Singh Chautala	INC	Naveen Jindal	HVP	Jatinder Singh (Kakka)
3	Karnal	BJP	I. D. Swami	INLD	Ashok Kumar Arora	INC	Arvind Kumar Sharma	HVP	Ram Chander Jangra
4	Sonepat	BJP	Kishan Singh Sangwan	INLD	Krishna Malik	INC	Dharam Pal Singh Malik	Did not contest	
5	Rohtak	BJP	Abhimanyu Singh Sindhu	INLD	Bhim Singh	INC	Bhupinder Singh Hooda	HVP	Usha
6	Faridabad	BJP	Ram Chander Bainda	INLD	Mohd. Ilyas	INC	Avtar Singh Bhadana	HVP	Devender Bhadana
7	Mahendragarh	BJP	Sudha Yadav	INLD	Swami Dharam Dev	INC	Rao Inderjit Singh	HVP	Anil Rao
8	Bhiwani	BJP	Ram Bilas	INLD	Ajay Singh Chautala	INC	Kuldeep Bishnoi	HVP	Surender Singh
9	Hisar	BJP	Swami Raghvanand	INLD	Surender Singh Barwala	INC	Jai Parkash	HVP	Kanwal Singh
10	Sirsa (SC)	BJP	Mahaveer Prasad	INLD	Dr. Sushil Indora	INC	Atma Singh Gill	HVP	Rair Chand

== Result by party ==
Party Name	Popular vote			Seats		
Party Name	Votes	%	±pp	Contested	Won	+/−
INC	34,09,950	42.13	▲7.20	10	9	▲9
INLD	18,15,683	22.43	▼6.29	10	0	▼5
BJP	13,93,106	17.21	▼12.00	10	1	▼4
HVP	5,06,122	6.25	▲3.54	9	0	
BSP	4,03,254	4.98	▲3.02	10	0	
SP	1,37,050	1.69		6	0	
ESP	1,26,924	1.57		3	0	
Others	51,876	0.63	Steady	26	0	Steady
IND	2,49,413	3.08		76	0	Steady
Total	80,93,378	100%	-	160	10	-

== Result by constituency ==
Constituency			Turnout	Winner			Runner-up			Margin	
No.	Name	Type	Turnout	Candidate	Party	Votes	Candidate	Party	Votes	Votes	%
1	Ambala	SC	70.69	Selja Kumari	INC	4,15,264	Rattan Lal Kataria	BJP	1,80,329	2,34,935	27.71
2	Kurukshetra	GEN	73.24	Naveen Jindal	INC	3,62,054	Abhay Singh Chautala	INLD	2,01,864	1,60,190	18.83
3	Karnal	GEN	66.04	Arvind Kumar Sharma	INC	3,18,948	I. D. Swami	BJP	1,54,186	1,64,762	20.12
4	Sonepat	GEN	64.75	Kishan Singh Sangwan	BJP	2,33,477	Dharam Pal Singh Malik	INC	2,25,908	7,569	1.03
5	Rohtak	GEN	62.96	Bhupinder Singh Hooda	INC	3,24,235	Captain Abhimanyu	BJP	1,73,800	1,50,435	22.72
6	Faridabad	GEN	54.62	Avtar Singh Bhadana	INC	3,57,284	Mohammad Ilyas	INLD	2,05,355	1,51,929	17.99
7	Mahendragarh	GEN	59.44	Inderjit Singh Rao	INC	3,58,714	Sudha Yadav	BJP	1,48,373	2,10,341	24.77
8	Bhiwani	GEN	73.09	Kuldeep Bishnoi	INC	2,90,936	Surender Singh	HVP	2,66,532	24,404	2.8
9	Hissar	GEN	67.74	Jai Parkash	INC	4,07,210	Surender Singh Barwala	INLD	2,24,442	1,82,768	23.74
10	Sirsa	SC	68.99	Atma Singh Gill	INC	3,49,397	Sushil Kumar Indora	INLD	2,77,922	71,475	8.49

== Assembly segments wise lead of Parties ==
Party	Assembly segments	Position in Assembly (as of 2005 elections)
Indian National Congress	71	67
Indian National Lok Dal	10	9
Bharatiya Janata Party	5	2
Haryana Vikas Party	4	Party was Dissolved
Others	0	12
Total	90	
