= 2004 Indian general election in Himachal Pradesh =

- 10 May 2004

4 seats
- Turnout: 59.3%

| | First party | Second party |
|---|---|---|
| Party | INC | BJP |
| Last election | 0 | 3 |
| Seats won | 3 | 1 |
| Seat change | ▲3 | ▼2 |
| Percentage | 51.9% | 44.2% |
Prime Minister before election
A. B. Vajpayee
BJP
Prime Minister after election
Manmohan Singh
INC

The 2004 Indian general election in Himachal Pradesh were held for 4 seats. The Indian National Congress won 3 seats while the Bhartiya Janata Party won 1 seat.

The BJP survived a clean sweep by the Congress as one of its candidates, Suresh Chandel, managed to scrape through by a slender margin in the Hamirpur Lok Sabha constituency. He defeated Ram Lal Thakur, Industries Minister, by 2202 votes

== Parties and alliances ==
=== National Democratic Alliance ===
| Party | Flag | Symbol | Leader | Seats contested |
|---|---|---|---|---|
| Bharatiya Janata Party | | | Prem Kumar Dhumal | 4 |

=== United Progressive Alliance ===
| Party | Flag | Symbol | Leader | Seats contested |
|---|---|---|---|---|
| Indian National Congress | | | Virbhadra Singh | 4 |

== Results ==
=== Results by Party ===
| Party Name | Popular vote | | | Seats | | |
| Party Name | Votes | % | ±pp | Contested | Won | +/− |
|---|---|---|---|---|---|---|
| INC | 12,94,988 | 51.89 | ▲12.37 | 4 | 3 | ▲3 |
| BJP | 11,04,066 | 44.24 | ▼2.03 | 4 | 1 | ▼2 |
| BSP | 43,475 | 1.74 | ▲1.43 | 4 | 0 | Steady |
| SP | 7,092 | 0.28 | ▲0.19 | 1 | 0 | Steady |
| JD(S) | 4,453 | 0.18 | ▼0.01 | 1 | 0 | Steady |
| IND | 41,412 | 1.66 | ▲1.18 | 9 | 0 | Steady |
| Total | 24,95,486 | 100% | - | 23 | 4 | - |

=== Elected MPs ===
| Constituency | | Winner | | | | Runner Up | | | | Margin | % |
| # | Name | Candidate | Party | Votes | % | Candidate | Party | Votes | % | Margin | % |
|---|---|---|---|---|---|---|---|---|---|---|---|
| 1 | Simla (SC) | Dhani Ram Shandil | INC | 3,11,182 | 58.86 | Hira Nand Kashyap | BJP | 2,03,002 | 38.40 | 1,08,180 | 20.46 |
| 2 | Mandi | Pratibha Singh | INC | 3,57,623 | 53.41 | Maheshwar Singh | BJP | 2,91,057 | 43.47 | 66,566 | 9.94 |
| 3 | Kangra | Chander Kumar | INC | 3,14,555 | 48.91 | Shanta Kumar | BJP | 2,96,764 | 46.14 | 17,791 | 2.77 |
| 4 | Hamirpur | Suresh Chandel | BJP | 3,13,243 | 47.89 | Ram Lal Thakur | INC | 3,11,628 | 47.64 | 1,615 | 0.25 |

== Bye-Elections Held ==
| Constituency | | | Winner | | | | Runner Up | | | | Margin |
| No. | Name | Date | Candidate | Party | Votes | % | Candidate | Party | Votes | % | Margin |
|---|---|---|---|---|---|---|---|---|---|---|---|
| 4 | Hamirpur | 2007 | Prem Kumar Dhumal | BJP | 382,128 | 54.32 | Thakur Ram Lal | INC | 302,069 | 42.94 | 80,059 |
| 4 | Hamirpur | 2007 | The bypoll was held due to the resignation of the sitting Member of Parliament, creating a vacancy in the constituency. | | | | | | | | |
| 4 | Hamirpur | 2008 | Anurag Singh Thakur | BJP | 374,339 | 63.94 | Madan Lal | INC | 199,673 | 34.10 | 174,666 |
| 4 | Hamirpur | 2008 | The bypoll was held after the sitting MP, Prem Kumar Dhumal, resigned from the Lok Sabha upon becoming Chief Minister of Himachal Pradesh. | | | | | | | | |

== Assembly Segment wise lead ==
| Party | Assembly segments | Position in Assembly (as of 2007 election) |
|---|---|---|
| Indian National Congress | 45 | 23 |
| Bharatiya Janata Party | 23 | 41 |
| Others | 0 | 4 |
| Total | 68 | |

== See also ==
- Results of the 2009 Indian general election by state
