= Sampurna Vikas Dal =

Political party in Bihar, India

Sampurna Vikas Dal (SVD) is a political party in the Indian state of Bihar. SVD was formed by ex-Rajya Sabha MP and former Rashtriya Janata Dal (RJD) leader Ranjan Prasad Yadav on October 20, 2003. Yadav differed with RJD leader Laloo Prasad Yadav when the latter appointed his wife, Rabri Devi, as the Chief Minister of the state. It contested three seats in 2004 Indian general election.
