= 2004 Indian general election in Gujarat =

Indian general election in Gujarat, 2004
- April–May 2004

26 seats
	First party	Second party
	NDA	INC
Party	NDA	INC+ (post poll UPA)
Last election	20	6
Seats won	14	12
Seat change	▼6	▲6
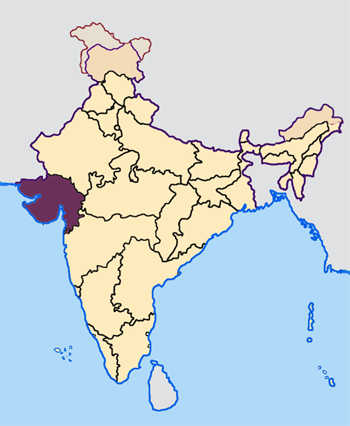
- Gujarat
Prime Minister before election
Atal Bihari Vajpayee
BJP
Prime Minister after election
Manmohan Singh
INC

In the 2004 Indian general election for Gujarat polls were held for 26 seats in the state. The result was a victory for the Bharatiya Janata Party (BJP) which won 14 seats. The remaining 12 seats were won by Indian National Congress (INC).

== Parties and alliances ==
=== National Democratic Alliance ===
Party	Flag	Symbol	Leader	Seats contested
Bharatiya Janata Party			Narendra Modi	26

=== United Progressive Alliance ===
Party	Flag	Symbol	Leader	Seats contested
Indian National Congress			B. K. Gadhvi	25
Nationalist Congress Party			Sharad Pawar	1

== Results ==
=== Results by Party/Alliance ===
Alliance/ Party		Popular vote			Seats		
Alliance/ Party		Votes	%	±pp	Contested	Won	+/−
BJP		72,04,915	47.37	▼5.11	26	14	▼6
UPA	INC	66,71,926	43.86	▼1.58	25	12	▲6
UPA	NCP	1,76,634	1.16	▲0.64	1	0	Steady
UPA	Total	68,48,560	45.02	Steady	26	12	Steady
Others		6,32,374	4.16	Steady	45	0	Steady
IND		5,25,055	3.45	▲2.78	65	0	Steady
Total		1,52,10,904	100%	-	162	26	-

== List of winners ==
Constituency		Winner				Runner-up				Margin	
Constituency		Candidate	Party	Votes	%	Candidate	Party	Votes	%	Votes	%
1	Kutch	Gadhavi Pushpadan Shambhudan	BJP	221,057	48.16	Shailendrasinh Jadeja	INC	192,067	41.84	28,990	6.32
2	Surendranagar	Koli Patel Somabhai Gandabhai	BJP	219,872	48.26	Savshibhai Kanjibhai Makwana	INC	185,928	40.81	33,944	7.45
3	Jamnagar	Ahir Vikrambhai Arjunbhai Madam	INC	204,468	47.17	Chandresh Patel Kordia	BJP	198,875	45.88	5,593	1.29
4	Rajkot	Dr. Kathiria Vallabhbhai Ramjibhai	BJP	320,604	59.52	Balvantbhai Bachubhai Manvar	NCP	176,634	32.79	143,970	26.73
5	Porbandar	Patel Harilal Madhavjibhai (Haribhai Patel)	BJP	229,113	46.71	Radadiya Vithalbhai Hansrajbhai	INC	223,410	45.55	5,703	1.16
6	Junagadh	Barad Jasubhai Dhanabhai	INC	329,712	50.05	Chikhaliya Bhavnaben Devarajbhai	BJP	288,791	43.84	40,921	6.21
7	Amreli	Virjibhai Thummar	INC	220,649	46.39	Dileep Sanghany	BJP	218,619	45.96	2,030	0.43
8	Bhavnagar	Rajendrasinh Ghanshyamsinh Rana	BJP	247,336	55.60	Gigabhai Gohil	INC	166,910	37.52	80,426	18.08
9	Dhandhuka (SC)	Varma Ratilal Kalidas	BJP	249,322	48.27	Yogendrakumar Mavjibhai Makwana	INC	226,528	43.85	22,794	4.41
10	Ahmedabad	Harin Pathak	BJP	301,853	55.03	Gupta Rajkumar Gigraj	INC	224,248	40.88	77,605	14.15
11	Gandhinagar	L. K. Advani	BJP	516,120	61.04	Gabhaji Mangaji Thakor	INC	298,982	35.36	217,138	25.68
12	Mehsana	Jivabhai Ambalal Patel	INC	339,643	48.84	Nitinbhai Ratilal Patel	BJP	325,132	46.75	14,511	2.09
13	Patan (SC)	Kanodia Maheshkumar Mithabhai	BJP	273,970	50.91	Rastrapal Pravin Somabhai	INC	250,346	46.52	23,624	4.39
14	Banaskantha	Chavda Harisinhaji Pratapsinhaji	INC	301,148	46.88	Chaudhary Haribhai Parthibhai	BJP	294,220	45.80	6,928	1.08
15	Sabarkantha	Madhusudan Mistry	INC	316,483	48.36	Bara Ramilaben Bahecharbhai	BJP	276,555	42.26	39,928	6.10
16	Kapadvanj	Vaghela Shankersinh Laxmansinh	INC	320,338	53.81	Vaghela Liladharbhai Khodaji	BJP	240,903	40.47	79,435	13.34
17	Dohad (ST)	Katara Babubhai Khimabhai	BJP	228,154	44.06	Taviyad Dr. Prabhababen Kishorsinh	INC	227,793	43.99	361	0.07
18	Godhra	Solanki Bhupendrasinh Prabhatsinh	BJP	295,550	55.00	Patel Rajendrasinh Balvantsinh	INC	241,831	45.00	53,719	10.00
19	Kaira	Dinsha Patel	INC	244,037	54.12	Gaekwad Shubhanginiraje Ranjitsinh	BJP	187,288	41.53	56,749	12.58
20	Anand	Solanki Bharatsinh Madhavsinh	INC	307,762	52.05	Jayprakash Vaghajibhai Patel (Babalbhai)	BJP	246,677	41.72	61,085	10.33
21	Chhota Udaipur (ST)	Naranbhai Rathwa	INC	246,855	44.36	Ramsinh Rathwa	BJP	210,616	37.85	36,239	6.51
22	Baroda	Jayaben Thakkar	BJP	316,089	48.45	Gaekwad Satyajitsinh Duleepsinh	INC	309,486	47.44	6,603	1.01
23	Broach	Vasava Mansukhbhai Dhanjibhai	BJP	299,630	44.01	Patel Muhammad Fansiwala	INC	227,428	33.41	72,202	10.61
24	Surat	Kashiram Rana	BJP	508,076	56.69	Chandravadan Chhotubhai Pithawala	INC	357,513	39.89	150,563	16.80
25	Mandvi (ST)	Chaudhary Tusharbhai Amarsinhbhai	INC	386,592	59.95	Mansinh Patel	BJP	213,210	33.07	173,382	26.89
26	Bulsar (ST)	Kishanbhai Vestabhai Patel	INC	321,769	46.63	Chaudhari Manibhai Ramjibhai	BJP	277,283	40.19	44,486	6.45

== Post-election Union Council of Ministers from Gujarat ==
#	Name	Constituency	Designation	Department	From	To	Party
1	Shankersinh Vaghela	Kapadvanj	Cabinet Minister	Textiles	23 May 2004	22 May 2009	INC
2	Naranbhai Rathwa	Chhota Udaipur (ST)	Minister of State	Railways	23 May 2004	22 May 2009	INC
3	Dinsha Patel	Kaira	Minister of State	Petroleum and Natural Gas	29 January 2006	22 May 2009	INC

== Assembly segments wise lead of parties ==
Party	Assembly segments	Position in Assembly (as of 2002)
Indian National Congress	91	51
Bharatiya Janata Party	89	127
Janata Dal (United)	1	1
Nationalist Congress Party	1	–
Others	–	3
Total	182	
