= Bharatiya Rashtravadi Paksha =

Political party in India

BRP symbol

The Bharatiya Rashtravadi Paksha ('Indian Nationalist Party') is a political party in Gujarat, India. The party was registered in 2003. It has its headquarters in Mehsana. The party fielded a single candidate in the 2004 Lok Sabha election, who got 11,459 votes.

The party fielded a single candidate in the 2009 Lok Sabha election, Dr. P.C. Patel. Dr. Patel carried out the election campaign walking by foot from village to village in the constituency. At the time the party reported having 250 members. Dr. Patel obtained 1,407 votes.

The party is opposed to caste-based reservations. Rather it favours economic-based reservations and free education.
