= India Shining =

BJP's slogan

India Shining, India Rising was a marketing slogan referring to the overall feeling of economic optimism in India in 2004. The slogan was popularised by the then-ruling Bharatiya Janata Party (BJP) for the 2004 Indian general elections. The slogan was initially developed as a part of an Indian government campaign intended to promote India internationally.

Advertising firm Grey Worldwide won the campaign account in 2003; the slogan and the associated campaign was developed by national creative director Prathap Suthan, in consultation with Finance Minister Jaswant Singh. The government spent an estimated US$20 million of government funds on national television advertisements and newspaper ads featuring the "India Shining" slogan.

Some editorials also suggested that the India Shining campaign was one of the causes for the subsequent defeat of the Atal Bihari Vajpayee government in the 2004 parliamentary elections, particularly in urban areas, the target audience of the campaign.

The negative assessment of the India Shining campaign was echoed after the election by former Deputy Prime Minister L.K. Advani, who described it as "valid," but "inappropriate for our election campaign... By making them verbal icons of our election campaign, we gave our political opponents an opportunity to highlight other aspects of India's contemporary reality... which questioned our claim."

== Controversy ==
There has been controversy over the "Indian Shining" advertisements as to whether the governments, States or Centre, are permitted to use taxpayers money to promote any political gain. The BJP government spent an approximate cost of ₹5 billion for the advertisements campaign during the 2004 elections.

The "India Shining" slogan drew criticism from various columnists and political critics of the ruling National Democratic Alliance government for glossing over a variety of social problems, including poverty and social inequality.

The slogan was then used as a central theme in the BJP's campaign for the 2004 national elections, a move criticised by the BJP's political opponents, who felt that public money was being used for partisan purposes. In response, the Indian Election Commission banned the slogan's broadcast until after the elections, although BJP politicians continued to use the slogan in other contexts.

== See also ==
- Achhe din aane waale hain
