= Jana Unnayan Mancha =

Political party in India

Jana Unnayan Mancha (JUM) a registered political party in the Indian state of West Bengal. It is the political front of Federation of Consumer Associations, West Bengal. The party's state secretary is Ramanimohan Nag Chowdhury, a retired senior officer of the Central Bureau of Investigation. The party won three seats in the 2003 panchayat (local council) elections. JUM launched one candidate in the 2006 West Bengal legislative election, Mala Banerjee in Diamond Harbour. Banerjee got 613 votes (0.48%).
