= Democratic Bharatiya Samaj Party =

Political party in Punjab, India

Democratic Bharatiya Samaj Party (Democratic Indian Society Party) is a political party in Punjab, India. The Current party president is Rajinder Kumar Gill and founder of this party is Mr Vijay kumar Hans who died in 2019. In the Lok Sabha elections in 2004 DBSP had put up two candidates, Vijay Kumar Hans from Jullundur (1,288 votes, 0.17%) and Parminder Singh Qaumi from Bhatinda (5,429 votes, 0,71%). In the Punjab assembly elections 2002 the party had put up nine candidates, who together got 3,189 votes. Vijay Kumar Hans Died on 5 Sep 2019 and After his death, Mr Rajinder Kumar Gill become national president of Democratic Bhartia Samaj party on 14 Feb 2020.
