= 2004 Indian general election in Jammu and Kashmir =

- 20 April, 26 April, 5 May and 10 May 2004
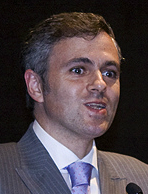

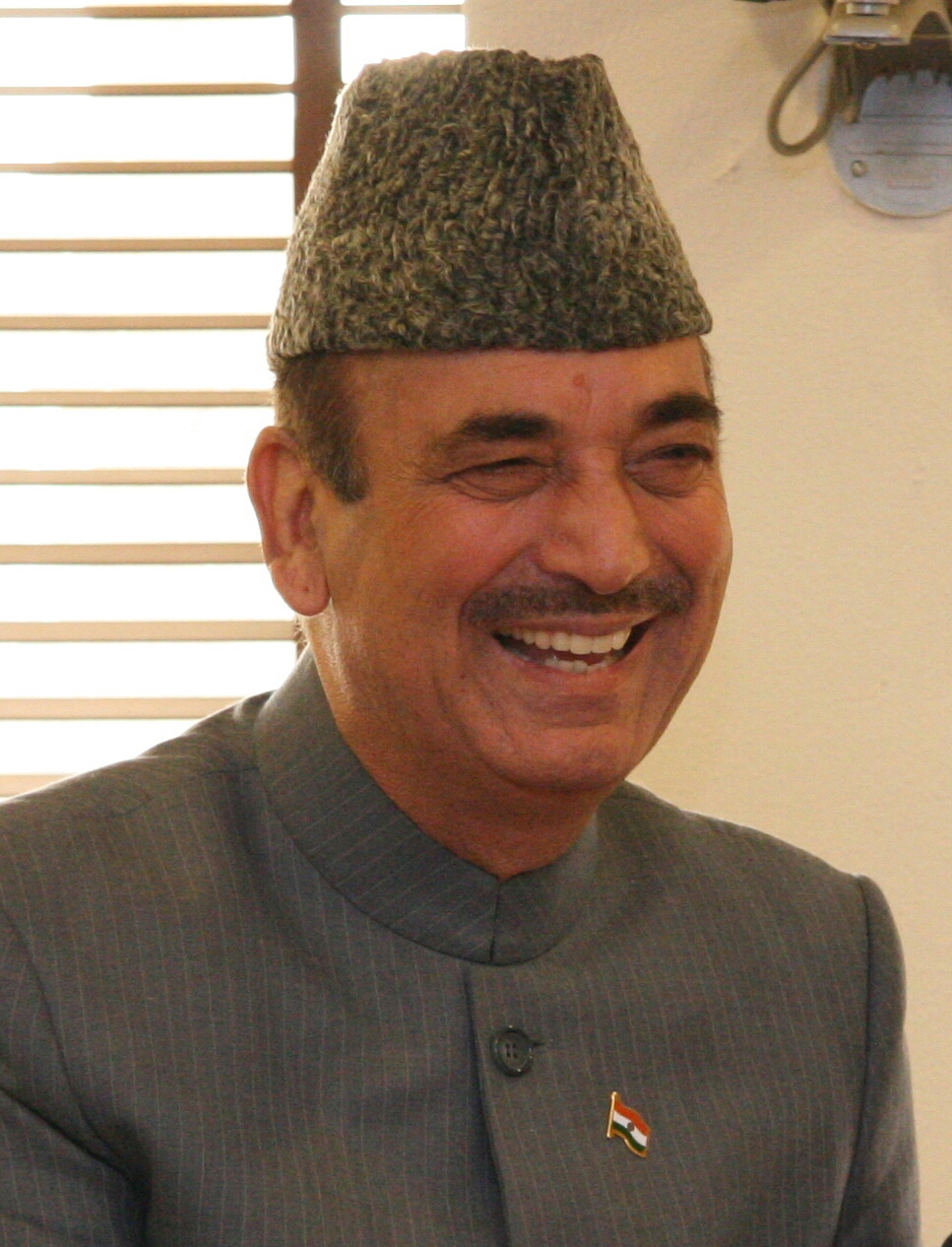

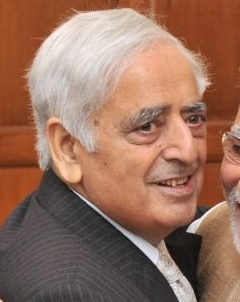
	First party	Second party	Third party
Leader	Omar Abdullah	Ghulam Nabi Azad	Mufti Mohammad Sayeed
Party	JKNC	INC	JKPDP
Alliance	-	UPA	UPA
Seats won	2	2	1
Seat change	▼2	▲2	▲1
Percentage	22.02%	27.83%	11.94%
Swing	▼2.03%	▲10.00%	new party
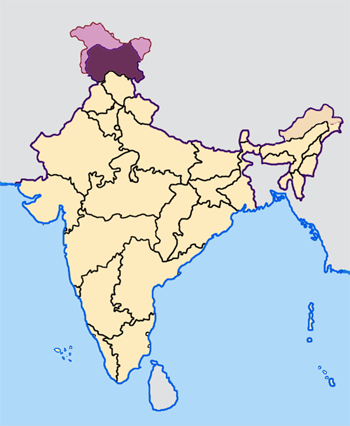
- Jammu and Kashmir

The 2004 Indian general election in Jammu and Kashmir to the 14th Lok Sabha were held for 6 seats. Jammu and Kashmir National Conference won 2 seats, Indian National Congress won 2, Jammu and Kashmir Peoples Democratic Party won one seat and one was won by an Independent politician Thupstan Chhewang from Ladakh.

== Constituency Details ==
Constituency	Candidates	Electors	Voters	Polling %	Polling Stations
Baramulla	13	9,40,998	3,35,442	35.65	1,167
Srinagar	16	10,53,734	1,95,678	18.57	1,080
Anantnag	19	9,98,905	1,50,219	15.04	1,049
Ladakh	8	1,75,768	1,29,230	73.52	442
Udhampur	22	13,48,721	6,08,079	45.09	1,655
Jammu	31	18,49,989	8,20,595	44.49	1,822

== Parties and alliances ==
Party/Alliance		Flag	Electoral symbol	Leader	Seats contested
UPA	Indian National Congress			Ghulam Nabi Azad	3
UPA	Jammu & Kashmir Peoples Democratic Party			Mufti Mohammed Sayeed	2 + 1 (Note: Friendly Contest on Baramulla between PDP and INC.)
Jammu & Kashmir National Conference				Farooq Abdullah	6
Bharatiya Janata Party				Nirmal Kumar Singh	6

== List of Candidates ==
Constituency		JKNC		JKPDP + INC		BJP	
#	Name	Party	Candidate	Party	Candidate	Party	Candidate
1	Baramulla	JKNC	Abdul Rashid Shaheen	JKPDP	Nizam Uddin Bhat	BJP	Mohmad Akbar
1	Baramulla	JKNC	Abdul Rashid Shaheen	INC	Ghulam Rasool Kar	BJP	Mohmad Akbar
2	Srinagar	JKNC	Omar Abdullah	JKPDP	Ghulam Nabi Lone	BJP	Iftikhar Sadiq
3	Anantnag	JKNC	Dr. Mehboob Beg	JKPDP	Mehbooba Mufti	BJP	Sofi Mohd. Yousuf
4	Ladakh	JKNC	Hassan Khan			BJP	Sonam Palzor
5	Udhampur	JKNC	Khalid Najib Suharwardy	INC	Chaudhary Lal Singh	BJP	Chaman Lal Gupta
6	Jammu	JKNC	Surjeet Singh Slathia	INC	Madan Lal Sharma	BJP	Nirmal Kumar Singh

== Results ==
=== Results by Party/Alliance ===
Alliance/ Party		Popular vote			Seats		
Alliance/ Party		Votes	%	±pp	Contested	Won	+/−
UPA	INC	6,23,182	27.83	▲10.00	2 + 1	2	▲2
UPA	JKPDP	2,67,457	11.94	Steady	2 + 1	1	▲1
UPA	Total	8,90,639	39.77	Steady	4 + 2	3	Steady
JKNC		4,93,067	22.02	▼6.92	6	2	▼2
BJP		5,15,965	23.04	▼8.52	6	0	▼2
JKNPP		67,619	3.02	▲2.14	4	0	Steady
BSP		49,754	2.22	▼2.62	3	0	Steady
Others		56,946	2.55	Steady	21	0	Steady
IND		1,65,352	7.38	▼2.25	37	1	Steady
Total		22,39,342	100%	-	83	6	-

=== List of Elected MPs ===
Parliamentary Constituency			Turnout	Winner				Runner-up				Margin	
No.	Name	Type	Turnout	Candidate	Party	Votes	Vote%	Candidate	Party	Votes	Vote%	Votes	%
1	Baramulla	GEN	35.65	Abdul Rashid Shaheen	JKNC	1,27,653		Nizamuudin Bhat	JKPDP	1,17,758		9,895	2.96%
2	Srinagar	GEN	18.57	Omar Abdullah	JNNC	98,422		Ghulam Nabi Lone	JKPDP	75,263		23,159	11.84%
3	Anantnag	GEN	15.04	Mehbooba Mufti	JKPDP	74,436		Mirza Mehboob Beg	JKNC	35,498		38,938	25.92%
4	Ladakh	GEN	73.52	Thupstan Chhewang	Independent	66,839		Hassan Khan	JKNC	41,126		25,713	19.94%
5	Udhampur	GEN	45.09	Ch. Lal Singh	INC	2,40,872		Chaman Lal Gupta	BJP	1,93,697		47,175	7.76%
6	Jammu	GEN	44.49	Madan Lal Sharma	INC	3,19,994		Nirmal Singh	BJP	3,02,426		17,568	2.14%

== Post-election Union Council of Ministers from Jammu and Kashmir ==
#	Name	Constituency	Designation	Department	From	To	Party
1	Ghulam Nabi Azad	Rajya Sabha (Jammu & Kashmir)	Cabinet Minister	Parliamentary Affairs	23 May 2004	1 November 2005	INC
1	Ghulam Nabi Azad	Rajya Sabha (Jammu & Kashmir)	Cabinet Minister	Urban Development	23 May 2004	1 November 2005	INC
2	Saifuddin Soz	Rajya Sabha (Jammu & Kashmir)	Cabinet Minister	Water Resources	29 January 2006	22 May 2009	INC

== Assembly segments wise lead of Parties ==
Party	Assembly segments	Position in Assembly (as of 2002 election)
Jammu & Kashmir National Conference	25	28
Jammu and Kashmir Peoples Democratic Party	23	16
Indian National Congress	20	20
Bharatiya Janata Party	15	1
Jammu and Kashmir National Panthers Party	1	4
Communist Party of India (Marxist)	1	1
Others	2	17
Total	87	

== See also ==
- Elections in Jammu and Kashmir
