= Bharatiya Manavata Vikas Party =

Political party in India

Bharatiya Manavata Vikas Party (Indian Human Development Party), political party in India. The party was formed in 2001 by the founder of the Indian Institute of Planning and Management (IIPM) Malayendra Kisor Chaudhury. The party claims to work for development in poor rural areas, and is a continuation of other organizations (Manav Seva Kendras) that were initiated by Chaudhury. Chaudhury launched his new political party ahead of the Lok Sabha and state assembly elections in Orissa 2004. BMVP were given media coverage for their unorthodox methods for recruiting candidates through open interview sessions.

Chaudhury's BMVP didn't reach any major success in the elections. Chaudhury got 13 873 votes (1,46%) in Balasore and the other BMVP candidate Bijay Kumar Mallick got 10 303 (1,18%) in Jajpur. In the Orissa state assembly elections BMVP had launched ten candidates.
