= Urs Samyuktha Paksha =

Political party in Karnataka, India

Urs Samyuktha Paksha (Urs United Party), political party in the Indian state of Karnataka. USP was founded by businessman Hari L. Khoday on 16 January 2004. The goal of USP is to work for the rights of the Backward Castes. USP considers that it upholds the legacy of the former Chief Minister of Karnataka, Devaraj Urs. In the Lok Sabha elections 2004 USP launched three candidates.
