= 2009 Indian general election in Arunachal Pradesh =

- April–May 2009

2 seats
- Turnout: 68.17%
	First party	Second party
		BJP
Party	INC	BJP
Seats won	2	0
Seat change	▲2	▼2
Percentage	51.11%	37.17%
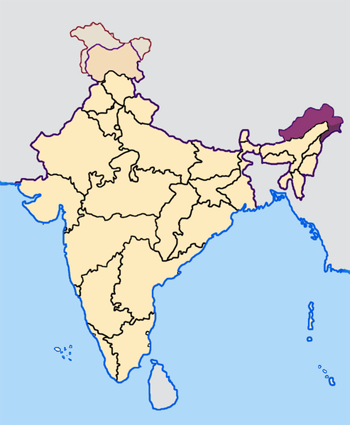
- Arunachal Pradesh
Prime Minister before election
Manmohan Singh
INC
Prime Minister after election
Manmohan Singh
INC

The 2009 Indian general election in Arunachal Pradesh were held for two seats, namely Arunachal West and Arunachal East. Indian National Congress won both the seats.

== Nominations ==
A total of 8 candidates (all men ) filed nominations with the Election Commission of India (ECI). Among these, none of the nominees were rejected by the ECI / withdrew their nominations. Thus, all 8 candidates contested elections.

== Parties and alliances ==
=== National Democratic Alliance ===
Party	Flag	Symbol	Leader	Seats contested
Bharatiya Janata Party			Kiren Rijiju	2

=== United Progressive Alliance ===
Party	Flag	Symbol	Leader	Seats contested
Indian National Congress			Nabam Tuki	2

== Results ==
Both the seats were won by the Indian National Congress.

Out of 8 candidates contesting, deposits of three candidates were forfeited for failing to secure more than one-sixth (16.7%) of the total valid votes cast.

=== Results by Party/Alliance ===
Party Name	Popular vote			Seats		
Party Name	Votes	%	±pp	Contested	Won	+/−
INC	2,55,866	51.11	▲41.15	2	2	▲2
BJP	1,86,103	37.17	▼16.68	2	0	▼2
AC	46,539	9.30	▼10.58	1	0	Steady
Others	8,967	1.79	Steady	2	0	Steady
IND	3,167	1.11	▼11.03	1	0	Steady
Total	5,00,642	100%	-	8	2	-

=== Results by constituency ===
Constituency			Winner				Runner Up				Margin	%
#	Name	Poll %	Candidate	Party	Votes	%	Candidate	Party	Votes	%	Margin	%
1	Arunachal West	65.93%	Takam Sanjoy	INC	140,443	49.16	Kiren Rijiju	BJP	139,129	48.70	1,314	0.46
2	Arunachal East	71.37%	Ninong Ering	INC	115,423	53.70	Tapir Gao	BJP	46,974	21.85	68,449	31.85

== Assembly Segment wise lead ==
Party	Assembly segments	Position in Assembly (as of 2009 election)
Indian National Congress	37	42
Bharatiya Janata Party	18	3
Arunachal Congress	5	0
Others	0	15
Total	60	

== See also ==
- Results of the 2009 Indian general election by state
