= 2004 Indian general election in Arunachal Pradesh =

- 5 May 2004

2 seats
| | First party | Second party |
|---|---|---|
| | NDA | INC |
| Party | NDA | INC |
| Seats won | 2 | 0 |
| Seat change | ▲2 | ▼2 |
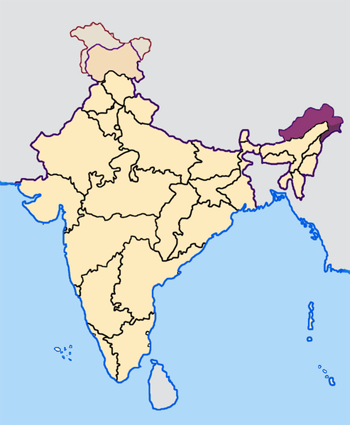
- Arunachal Pradesh
Prime Minister before election
A. B. Vajpayee
BJP
Prime Minister after election
Manmohan Singh
INC

The Indian state of Arunachal Pradesh represents two Lok Sabha constituencies. Following the 25 July 2003 Congress split, Gegong Apang formed the state government with the help of the Bharatiya Janata Party (BJP). Congress had an alliance with its splinter group Arunachal Congress. Congress candidate and former Arunachal Congress leader Wangcha Rajkumar contested Arunachal East and AC candidate Kamen Ringu contested Arunachal West. Nationalist Trinamool Congress had a candidate in Arunachal West, competing against BJP. BJP won both seats with comfortable margins.

Ahead of the 2004 Lok Sabha elections Arunachal Congress talked about calling for a boycott as a protest against Chakma and Hajong refugees having been given the right to vote in the state. In the end the party did however decide to contest.

== Parties and alliances ==
=== National Democratic Alliance ===
| Party | Flag | Symbol | Leader | Seats contested |
|---|---|---|---|---|
| Bharatiya Janata Party | | | Kiren Rijiju | 2 |

=== United Progressive Alliance ===
| Party | Flag | Symbol | Leader | Seats contested |
|---|---|---|---|---|
| Indian National Congress | | | Mukut Mithi | 1 |
| Arunachal Congress | | | Gegong Apang | 1 |

== Party wise Result ==
| Alliance/ Party | | Popular vote | | | Seats | | |
| Alliance/ Party | | Votes | % | ±pp | Contested | Won | +/− |
|---|---|---|---|---|---|---|---|
| BJP | | 2,07,286 | 53.85 | ▲37.55 | 2 | 2 | ▲2 |
| UPA | AC | 76,527 | 19.88 | ▲3.26 | 1 | 0 | Steady |
| UPA | INC | 38,341 | 9.96 | ▼46.96 | 1 | 0 | ▼2 |
| UPA | Total | 1,14,868 | 29.84 | Steady | 2 | 0 | Steady |
| AITC | | 6,241 | 1.62 | Steady | 1 | 0 | Steady |
| SP | | 4,901 | 1.27 | Steady | 1 | 0 | Steady |
| SAP | | 4,896 | 1.27 | Steady | 1 | 0 | Steady |
| IND | | 46,736 | 12.14 | Steady | 6 | 0 | Steady |
| Total | | 3,84,928 | 100% | - | 13 | 2 | - |

== Results by constituency ==
| Constituency | | Poll% | Winner | | | | Runner-up | | | | Margin | |
| Constituency | | Poll% | Candidate | Party | Votes | % | Candidate | Party | Votes | % | Votes | % |
|---|---|---|---|---|---|---|---|---|---|---|---|---|
| 1 | Arunachal West | 56.19% | Kiren Rijiju | BJP | 123,951 | 55.95 | Kamen Ringu | AC | 76,527 | 34.54 | 47,424 | 21.41 |
| 2 | Arunachal East | 56.56% | Tapir Gao | BJP | 83,335 | 51.01 | Wangcha Rajkumar | INC | 38,341 | 23.47 | 44,994 | 27.54 |

== Assembly Segment wise lead ==
| Party | Assembly segments | Position in Assembly (as of 2004 election) |
|---|---|---|
| Bharatiya Janata Party | 48 | 9 |
| Arunachal Congress | 5 | 2 |
| Indian National Congress | 2 | 34 |
| Others | 5 | 15 |
| Total | 60 | |
