= Ekta Shakti =

Political party in India

Ekta Shakti Party (United Force Party) was a regional political party in Haryana, India. Founded in 2004. The party president was Maratha Virender Verma, a former government employee. Verma is the son of Shiv Ram Verma, who was a member of the erstwhile Bharatiya Jana Sangh. Maratha bases his political movement amongst a people of North Haryana. Maratha claims that the previous governments of haryana did discrimination against the north haryana.he was initially able to win some support from the community. Maratha builds his political discourse on the accusation that northern Haryana has been discriminated against by politicians from western Haryana.

In the 2004 Lok Sabha elections the party fielded three candidates from northern Haryana. They got 13022, 82430 and 31202 votes respectively.

In the 2009 Lok Sabha election the party fielded candidates from Karnal (Lok Sabha constituency) seat Maratha Virender Verma (BSP)got around 228352 votes. He was in 2nd position after Congress candidate Arvind Sharma

मराठा वीरेंद्र वर्मा

Later merged to Indian National Congress
