= 2005 elections in India =

Elections in India
- 2005

== Overall result ==
Date(s)	State	Government before election	Chief Minister before election	Government after election	Chief Minister after election	Maps
3 – 23 February 2005	Bihar	Rashtriya Janata Dal	Rabri Devi	President's Rule		
3 – 23 February 2005	Jharkhand	Bharatiya Janata Party	Arjun Munda	Bharatiya Janata Party	Arjun Munda	
27 February 2005	Haryana	Indian National Lok Dal	Om Prakash Chautala	Indian National Congress	Bhupinder Singh Hooda	
18 October to 19 November 2005	Bihar	President's Rule		Janata Dal (United)	Nitish Kumar	

== Legislative Assembly elections ==
Elections to the State Legislative Assemblies were held in three Indian states during February 2005, Bihar, Haryana and Jharkhand. In Haryana the Indian National Congress won a landslide victory, dethroning the long-time Chief Minister Om Prakash Chautala. In Bihar and Jharkhand there was a fractured verdict. Since no government could be formed in Bihar, fresh elections were held in October–November the same year.

=== Bihar ===
==== February ====
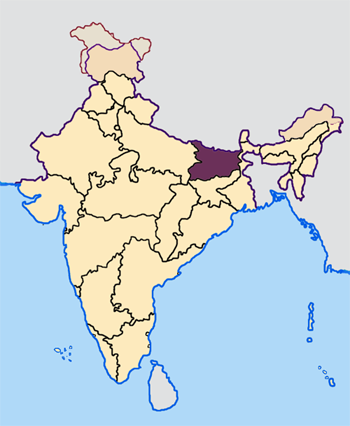
Bihar

Party	No. of candidates	No. of elected	No. of votes	%
Bharatiya Janata Party	103	37	2686290	10,97%
Bahujan Samaj Party	238	2	1080745	4,41%
Communist Party of India	17	3	386236	1,58%
Communist Party of India (Marxist)	12	1	156656	0,64%
Indian National Congress	84	10	1223835	5,00%
Nationalist Congress Party	31	3	240862	0,98%
Janata Dal (United)	138	55	3564930	14,55%
Jharkhand Mukti Morcha	18	0	76671	0,31%
Rashtriya Janata Dal	210	75	6140223	25,07%
All India Forward Bloc	3	0	5555	0,03%
Communist Party of India (Marxist-Leninist) Liberation	109	7	610345	2,49%
Janata Dal (Secular)	4	0	22428	0,09%
Indian Union Muslim League	1	0	4225	0,02%
Rashtriya Lok Dal	23	0	25618	0,10%
Shiv Sena	26	0	25698	0,10%
Samajwadi Party	142	4	658791	2,69%
Adarsh Political Party	1	0	736	0,00%
Akhil Bharatiya Ashok Sena	1	0	858	0,00%
Akhil Bharatiya Desh Bhakt Morcha	1	0	326	0,00%
Akhil Bharat Hindu Mahasabha	5	0	4603	0,02%
Akhil Bharatiya Jan Sangh	19	0	10990	0,04%
Apna Dal	64	0	73109	0,30%
All India Forward Bloc (Subhasist)	1	0	27045	0,11%
Akhand Jharkhand People's Front	7	0	9800	0,04%
Awami Party	3	0	24400	0,10%
Bajjikanchal Vikas Party	4	0	4693	0,02%
Bharatiya Momin Front	3	0	2008	0,01%
Bharat Mangalam Parishad	1	0	397	0,00%
Federal Congress of India	2	0	1752	0,01%
Gondvana Ganatantra Party	1	0	1460	0,01%
Indian Justice Party	15	0	20227	0,08%
Indian Union Muslim League	1	0	758	0,00%
Jai Hind Party	1	0	1467	0,01%
Jai Jawan Jai Kisan Mazdoor Congress	7	0	6695	0,03%
Janata Party	2	0	1071	0,00%
Janhit Samaj Party	4	0	4770	0,02%
Jawan Kisan Morcha	5	0	2705	0,01%
Jharkhand Disom Party	10	0	18717	0,08%
Kamjor Varg Sangh, Bihar	1	0	1529	0,01%
Kosi Vikas Party	1	0	19267	0,08%
Krantikari Samyavadi Party	8	0	10327	0,04%
Lok Dal	3	0	1496	0,01%
Lok Janshakti Party	178	29	3091173	12,62%
Lok Sewa Dal	3	0	1807	0,01%
Lokpriya Samaj Party	3	0	3438	0,01%
Loktantrik Samajwadi Party	1	0	1774	0,1%
Marxist Communist Party of India	3	0	3420	0,01%
National Loktantrik Party	5	0	4003	0,02%
Navbharat Nirman Party	1	0	2220	0,01%
Pragatisheel Manav Samaj Party	1	0	1011	0,00%
Proutist Sarva Samaj Party	3	0	3075	0,01%
Rashtravadi Janata Party	9	0	11227	0,05%
Rashtriya Garib Dal	2	0	1802	0,01%
Rashtriya Krantikari Samajwadi Party	4	0	3908	0,02%
Rashtriya Lok Seva Morcha	15	0	21571	0,09%
Rashtriya Samanta Dal	3	0	2891	0,01%
Rashtriya Swabhimaan Party	10	0	23122	0,09%
Samajwadi Jan Parishad	5	0	5466	0,02%
Samajwadi Janata Party (Rashtriya)	31	0	60528	0,25%
Samata Party	73	0	105438	0,43%
Sanatan Samaj Party	1	0	705	0,00%
Sarvhara Dal	1	0	1238	0,01%
Shoshit Samaj Dal	7	0	9303	0,04%
Shoshit Samaj Party	3	0	3729	0,02%
Suheldev Bhartiya Samaj Party	3	0	13655	0,06%
Independents	1493	17	3957945	16,16%
Total:	3193	243	24494763

==== October ====
Party	No. of candidates	No. of elected	No. of votes	%
Janata Dal (United)	139	88	4819759	20.46%
Bharatiya Janata Party	102	55	3686720	15.65%
Rashtriya Janata Dal	175	54	5525081	23.45%
Lok Jan Shakti Party	203	10	2615901	11.10%
Indian National Congress	51	9	1435449	6.09%
Communist Party of India (Marxist-Leninist) (Liberation)	85	5	559326	2.37%
Bahujan Samaj Party	212	4	981464	4.17%
Communist Party of India	35	3	491689	2.09%
Samajwadi Party	158	2	594266	2.52%
Nationalist Congress Party	8	1	186936	0.79%
Communist Party of India (Marxist)	10	1	159906	0.68%
Akhil Jan Vikas Dal	7	1	49869	0.21%
Indian Justice Party	36	0	51004	0.22%
Shivsena	15	0	44562	0.19%
All India Forward Bloc	3	0	42749	0.18%
Samata Party	20	0	28374	0.12%
Kosi Vikas Party	1	0	27071	0.11%
Rashtriya Lok Dal	13	0	21998	0.09%
Jai Jawan Jai Kisan Mazdoor Congress	8	0	19045	0.08%
Ambedkar National Congress	8	0	14396	0.06%
Suheldev Bhartiya Samaj Party	2	0	11037	0.05%
Samajwadi Janata Party (Rashtriya)	8	0	12026	0.05%
Apna Dal	8	0	9179	0.04%
Gondvana Gantantra Party	7	0	8756	0.04%
Janata Dal (Secular)	6	0	7672	0.03%
Revolutionary Socialist Party	3	0	5920	0.03%
Rashtravadi Janata Party	3	0	7150	0.03%
Shoshit Samaj Dal	7	0	6421	0.03%
Akhil Bharat Hindu Mahasabha	5	0	5135	0.02%
Akhil Bharatiya Jan Sangh	8	0	5790	0.02%
Bharatiya Ekta Dal	2	0	3815	0.02%
Buddhiviveki Vikas Party	3	0	4096	0.02%
Jharkhand Disom Party	2	0	4351	0.02%
Proutist Sarva Samaj Party	2	0	3938	0.02%
Rashtriya Samanta Dal	2	0	4056	0.02%
Jammu & Kashmir National Panthers Party	2	0	1337	0.01%
Muslim League Kerala State Committee	2	0	1848	0.01%
Akhil Bharatiya Ashok Sena	1	0	1450	0.01%
Akhil Bharatiya Desh Bhakt Morcha	2	0	2690	0.01%
Amra Bangalee	2	0	3104	0.01%
Awami Party	1	0	1833	0.01%
Jai Hind Party	1	0	1531	0.01%
Jawan Kisan Morcha	2	0	1864	0.01%
Jai Prakash Janata Dal	2	0	2710	0.01%
Krantikari Samyavadi Party	1	0	2721	0.01%
Lok Dal	2	0	2402	0.01%
Lok Sewa Dal	1	0	2557	0.01%
National Loktantrik Party	3	0	2632	0.01%
Rashtriya Kamjor Varg Party	1	0	1359	0.01%
Republican Party of India	1	0	2430	0.01%
Bajjikanchal Vikas Party	1	0	400	0.00%
Bharatiya Momin Front	1	0	445	0.00%
Bharat Mangalam Parishad	1	0	1069	0.00%
Janata Party	1	0	942	0.00%
Pragatisheel Manav Samaj Party	1	0	407	0.00%
Rashtriya Garib Dal	1	0	1167	0.00%
Republican Party of India (A)	1	0	1089	0.00%
Samajik Jantantrik Party	1	0	553	0.00%
Independent	746	10	2065744	8.77%
Total:	2135	243	23559191	100%

=== Haryana ===
Rank	Party	Seats Contested	Seats Won	% Votes	% Votes in Seats Cont.
1	Indian National Congress	90	67	42.46	42.46
2	Independents	442	10	13.70	14.26
3	Indian National Lok Dal	89	9	26.77	26.95
4	Bharatiya Janata Party	90	2	10.36	10.36
5	Bahujan Samaj Party	84	1	3.22	3.44
5	Nationalist Congress Party	14	1	0.68	4.57
	Total		90		

=== Jharkhand ===
SN	Party	Seats Contested	Seats Won	% Votes	% Votes in Seats Contested
1	Bharatiya Janata Party	63	30	23.57	30.19
2	Jharkhand Mukti Morcha	49	17	14.29	24.04
3	Indian National Congress	41	9	12.05	22.74
4	Rashtriya Janata Dal	51	7	8.48	13.14
5	JANATA DAL (UNITED)	18	6	4.0	18.25
6	Independents	662	3	15.31	15.53
7	All India Forward Bloc	12	2	1.0	6.37
7	United Goans Democratic Party	22	2	1.52	5.92
7	All Jharkhand Students Union	40	2	2.81	5.75
8	Nationalist Congress Party	13	1	0.43	2.35
8	CPI(ML)(L)	28	1	2.46	6.58
8	Jharkhand Party	27	1	0.97	3.14
	Total		81		

== Legislative By-elections ==
=== Meghalaya ===
Winner, runner-up, voter turnout, and victory margin in every constituency
Assembly Constituency		Turnout	Winner				Runner Up				Margin
#k	Names	%	Candidate	Party	Votes	%	Candidate	Party	Votes	%	Margin
1	Mawprem	49.88%	Manas Chaudhuri	Independent	4,839	14.7%	Dambar B. Gurung	INC	3,521	35.4%	1,318
2	Selsella	71.83%	Clement Marak	INC	2,745	7.32%	Connad Kongkal Sangma	NCP	2,563	24.68%	182
3	Songsak	70.84%	Tonsing N Marak	INC	3,890	13.51%	Anderson Sangma	Independent	3,260	14.54%	630
