= Results of the 2009 Indian general election by party =

Indian lower house election in

Full results of the 2009 Indian general election by party.

| Party | Votes | % | Seats |
|---|---|---|---|
| Indian National Congress | 119,111,019 | 28.55 | 206 |
| Bharatiya Janata Party | 78,435,381 | 18.80 | 116 |
| Bahujan Samaj Party | 25,728,920 | 6.17 | 21 |
| Communist Party of India (Marxist) | 22,219,111 | 5.33 | 16 |
| Samajwadi Party | 14,284,638 | 3.42 | 23 |
| All India Trinamool Congress | 13,356,510 | 3.20 | 19 |
| Telugu Desam Party | 10,481,659 | 2.51 | 6 |
| Nationalist Congress Party | 8,521,502 | 2.04 | 9 |
| Dravida Munnetra Kazhagam | 7,625,397 | 1.83 | 18 |
| All India Anna Dravida Munnetra Kazhagam | 6,953,591 | 1.67 | 9 |
| Biju Janata Dal | 6,612,552 | 1.59 | 14 |
| Praja Rajyam Party | 6,590,046 | 1.58 | 0 |
| Shiv Sena | 6,454,950 | 1.55 | 11 |
| Janata Dal (United) | 6,331,201 | 1.52 | 20 |
| Communist Party of India | 5,951,888 | 1.43 | 4 |
| Rashtriya Janata Dal | 5,280,084 | 1.27 | 4 |
| Shiromani Akali Dal | 4,004,789 | 0.96 | 4 |
| Janata Dal (Secular) | 3,434,082 | 0.82 | 3 |
| Desiya Murpokku Dravida Kazhagam | 3,126,117 | 0.75 | 0 |
| Telangana Rashtra Samithi | 2,582,326 | 0.62 | 2 |
| Assam United Democratic Front | 2,184,553 | 0.52 | 1 |
| Pattali Makkal Katchi | 1,944,619 | 0.47 | 0 |
| Lok Jan Shakti Party | 1,891,963 | 0.45 | 0 |
| Rashtriya Lok Dal | 1,821,054 | 0.44 | 5 |
| Asom Gana Parishad | 1,773,103 | 0.43 | 1 |
| Jharkhand Mukti Morcha | 1,665,173 | 0.40 | 2 |
| Revolutionary Socialist Party | 1,573,650 | 0.38 | 2 |
| Maharashtra Navnirman Sena | 1,503,863 | 0.36 | 0 |
| All India Forward Bloc | 1,345,803 | 0.32 | 2 |
| Indian National Lok Dal | 1,286,573 | 0.31 | 0 |
| Marumalarchi Dravida Munnetra Kazhagam | 1,112,908 | 0.27 | 1 |
| Communist Party of India (Marxist–Leninist) Liberation | 1,044,510 | 0.25 | 0 |
| Jharkhand Vikas Morcha (Prajatantrik) | 963,274 | 0.23 | 1 |
| Muslim League Kerala State Committee | 877,494 | 0.21 | 2 |
| Nagaland Peoples Front | 832,224 | 0.20 | 1 |
| Haryana Janhit Congress (BL) | 816,395 | 0.20 | 1 |
| Viduthalai Chiruthaigal Katchi | 735,847 | 0.18 | 1 |
| Bodoland People's Front | 656,430 | 0.16 | 1 |
| Kongunadu Munnetra Kazhagam | 579,703 | 0.14 | 0 |
| Lok Satta Party | 557,376 | 0.13 | 0 |
| Peace Party | 537,638 | 0.13 | 0 |
| Jammu and Kashmir Peoples Democratic Party | 522,760 | 0.13 | 0 |
| Jammu & Kashmir National Conference | 498,374 | 0.12 | 3 |
| Apna Dal | 495,032 | 0.12 | 0 |
| Bharipa Bahujan Mahasangh | 492,470 | 0.12 | 0 |
| Swabhimani Paksha | 481,025 | 0.12 | 1 |
| Kerala Congress (M) | 404,962 | 0.10 | 1 |
| Republican Party of India (Athawale) | 379,746 | 0.09 | 0 |
| Kerala Congress | 333,688 | 0.08 | 0 |
| Suheldev Bhartiya Samaj Party | 319,307 | 0.08 | 0 |
| All India Majlis-e-Ittehadul Muslimeen | 308,061 | 0.07 | 1 |
| Republican Party of India | 294,650 | 0.07 | 0 |
| Pyramid Party of India | 287,576 | 0.07 | 0 |
| Loktantrik Samata Dal | 270,040 | 0.06 | 0 |
| Mahagujarat Janta Party | 245,174 | 0.06 | 0 |
| People's Democratic Alliance | 224,719 | 0.05 | 0 |
| Bahujan Vikas Aaghadi | 223,234 | 0.05 | 1 |
| Gondwana Ganatantra Party | 220,741 | 0.05 | 0 |
| Rashtriya Samaj Paksha | 215,042 | 0.05 | 0 |
| All Jharkhand Students Union | 200,523 | 0.05 | 0 |
| Swatantra Bharat Paksh | 188,608 | 0.05 | 0 |
| Indian Justice Party | 177,759 | 0.04 | 0 |
| Sikkim Democratic Front | 159,351 | 0.04 | 1 |
| Rashtriya Samanta Dal | 153,455 | 0.04 | 0 |
| Rashtriya Swabhimaan Party | 152,633 | 0.04 | 0 |
| Rashtrawadi Sena | 144,735 | 0.03 | 0 |
| Rashtriya Dehat Morcha Party | 139,404 | 0.03 | 0 |
| Samruddha Odisha | 131,379 | 0.03 | 0 |
| Janvadi Party (Socialist) | 129,595 | 0.03 | 0 |
| Jharkhand Party | 125,900 | 0.03 | 0 |
| United Democratic Party | 124,402 | 0.03 | 0 |
| Autonomous State Demand Committee | 123,287 | 0.03 | 0 |
| Puthiya Tamilagam | 120,797 | 0.03 | 0 |
| Lok Bhalai Party | 118,470 | 0.03 | 0 |
| Jharkhand Party (Naren) | 104,600 | 0.03 | 0 |
| Jharkhand Disom Party | 102,698 | 0.02 | 0 |
| Manipur Peoples Party | 101,787 | 0.02 | 0 |
| Hill State People's Democratic Party | 97,613 | 0.02 | 0 |
| Marxist Co-ordination Committee | 91,489 | 0.02 | 0 |
| Jammu and Kashmir National Panthers Party | 87,502 | 0.02 | 0 |
| Gondwana Mukti Sena | 85,355 | 0.02 | 0 |
| Prabuddha Republican Party | 76,518 | 0.02 | 0 |
| National Lokhind Party | 72,620 | 0.02 | 0 |
| Rashtriya Krantikari Samajwadi Party | 71,857 | 0.02 | 0 |
| Kranti Kari Jai Hind Sena | 70,715 | 0.02 | 0 |
| Manithaneya Makkal Katchi | 68,346 | 0.02 | 0 |
| Jammu and Kashmir People's Conference | 65,403 | 0.02 | 0 |
| Mahan Dal | 65,398 | 0.02 | 0 |
| Krantisena Maharashtra | 65,151 | 0.02 | 0 |
| Jago Party | 64,482 | 0.02 | 0 |
| Ambedkar National Congress | 60,896 | 0.01 | 0 |
| Sarvodaya Karnataka Paksha | 60,333 | 0.01 | 0 |
| Jharkhand Jan Morcha | 58,025 | 0.01 | 0 |
| Pragatisheel Manav Samaj Party | 57,649 | 0.01 | 0 |
| Rashtriya Kranti Party | 55,805 | 0.01 | 0 |
| Loksangram | 53,637 | 0.01 | 0 |
| Kalinga Sena | 53,033 | 0.01 | 0 |
| Trilinga Praja Pragati Party | 48,136 | 0.01 | 0 |
| Bira Oriya Party | 47,720 | 0.01 | 0 |
| Hindu Mahasabha | 47,456 | 0.01 | 0 |
| Arunachal Congress | 46,539 | 0.01 | 0 |
| Jharkhand Vikas Dal | 45,246 | 0.01 | 0 |
| Amra Bangali | 45,102 | 0.01 | 0 |
| Rashtra Sewa Dal | 43,184 | 0.01 | 0 |
| Shiromani Akali Dal (Simranjit Singh Mann) | 43,137 | 0.01 | 0 |
| Kosal Kranti Dal | 42,744 | 0.01 | 0 |
| Ambedkar Samaj Party | 42,586 | 0.01 | 0 |
| Bahujan Republican Ekta Manch | 42,386 | 0.01 | 0 |
| Loktantrik Samajwadi Party | 40,803 | 0.01 | 0 |
| A-Chik National Congress (Democratic) | 40,204 | 0.01 | 0 |
| Bharatiya Bahujan Party | 39,797 | 0.01 | 0 |
| Mana Party | 39,257 | 0.01 | 0 |
| Uttarakhand Kranti Dal | 38,633 | 0.01 | 0 |
| Navbharat Nirman Party | 37,219 | 0.01 | 0 |
| Rajasthan Vikas Party | 36,584 | 0.01 | 0 |
| Rashtravadi Janata Party | 34,670 | 0.01 | 0 |
| Bharatiya Jantantrik Janta Dal | 34,528 | 0.01 | 0 |
| Bahujan Sangharsh Party (Kanshiram) | 33,010 | 0.01 | 0 |
| Jharkhand Janadikhar Manch | 32,219 | 0.01 | 0 |
| Eklavya Samaj Party | 31,983 | 0.01 | 0 |
| Samta Party | 31,324 | 0.01 | 0 |
| Democratic Secular Party | 30,532 | 0.01 | 0 |
| Peoples Guardian | 30,340 | 0.01 | 0 |
| Samajwadi Janata Party (Rashtriya) | 30,091 | 0.01 | 0 |
| Lokpriya Samaj Party | 29,459 | 0.01 | 0 |
| Rashtriya Pragati Party | 29,151 | 0.01 | 0 |
| Nelopa (United) | 27,388 | 0.01 | 0 |
| Shoshit Samaj Dal | 26,807 | 0.01 | 0 |
| Akhil Bartiya Manav Seva Dal | 26,268 | 0.01 | 0 |
| Bharatiya Republican Paksha | 25,940 | 0.01 | 0 |
| Rashtravadi Communist Party | 25,842 | 0.01 | 0 |
| Lokdal | 24,588 | 0.01 | 0 |
| Jan Surajya Shakti | 23,925 | 0.01 | 0 |
| Samajwadi Jan Parishad | 23,539 | 0.01 | 0 |
| Akhil Bharatiya Congress Dal (Ambedkar) | 22,861 | 0.01 | 0 |
| Rashtravadi Aarthik Swatantrata Dal | 22,453 | 0.01 | 0 |
| Akhila India Jananayaka Makkal Katchi (Dr. Issac) | 21,609 | 0.01 | 0 |
| Akila India Vallalar Peravai | 20,982 | 0.01 | 0 |
| People's Democratic Forum | 20,699 | 0.00 | 0 |
| Bharatiya Jana Sangh | 20,599 | 0.00 | 0 |
| Moulik Adhikar Party | 20,534 | 0.00 | 0 |
| Bahujan Shakty | 18,844 | 0.00 | 0 |
| Peace Party of India | 18,726 | 0.00 | 0 |
| Chhattisgarh Vikas Party | 18,394 | 0.00 | 0 |
| Great India Party | 18,161 | 0.00 | 0 |
| Vanchit Jamat Party | 17,868 | 0.00 | 0 |
| Prajatantrik Samadhan Party | 17,570 | 0.00 | 0 |
| United Goans Democratic Party | 16,727 | 0.00 | 0 |
| Makkal Manadu Katchi | 16,699 | 0.00 | 0 |
| Bharatiya Sadbhawna Samaj Party | 15,948 | 0.00 | 0 |
| Marxist Communist Party of India (S.S. Srivastava) | 15,922 | 0.00 | 0 |
| Rashtriya Krantikari Janata Party | 15,847 | 0.00 | 0 |
| Bharatiya Sarvodaya Kranti Party | 15,734 | 0.00 | 0 |
| Bharatheeya Sadharma Samsthapana Party | 15,718 | 0.00 | 0 |
| Bahujan Uday Manch | 15,272 | 0.00 | 0 |
| Puthiya Needhi Katchi | 15,074 | 0.00 | 0 |
| Bharat Punarnirman Dal | 14,974 | 0.00 | 0 |
| Smast Bhartiya Party | 14,435 | 0.00 | 0 |
| Akhil Bharatiya Ashok Sena | 13,828 | 0.00 | 0 |
| Bharatiya Momin Front | 13,737 | 0.00 | 0 |
| Bhartiya Jagran Party | 13,506 | 0.00 | 0 |
| Jana Hitkari Party | 13,313 | 0.00 | 0 |
| Rashtriya Jan-Jagram Morcha | 13,194 | 0.00 | 0 |
| Ulzaipali Makkal Katchy | 13,193 | 0.00 | 0 |
| Republican Party of India Ektawadi | 12,767 | 0.00 | 0 |
| Rashtriya Janwadi Party (Krantikari) | 12,732 | 0.00 | 0 |
| Jawan Kisan Morcha | 12,716 | 0.00 | 0 |
| United Women Front | 12,338 | 0.00 | 0 |
| Chhattisgarhi Samaj Party | 11,972 | 0.00 | 0 |
| Loktanrik Sarkar Party | 11,893 | 0.00 | 0 |
| Republican Paksha (Khoripa) | 11,724 | 0.00 | 0 |
| Peoples Republican Party | 11,341 | 0.00 | 0 |
| Bharatiya Samta Samaj Party | 11,151 | 0.00 | 0 |
| Bajjikanchal Vikas Party | 11,097 | 0.00 | 0 |
| Bahujan Samaj Party(Ambedkar-Phule) | 10,698 | 0.00 | 0 |
| Kosi Vikas Party | 10,447 | 0.00 | 0 |
| All India Minorities Front | 10,211 | 0.00 | 0 |
| Aadivasi Sena Party | 9,936 | 0.00 | 0 |
| Jammu and Kashmir Awami National Conference | 9,900 | 0.00 | 0 |
| Bharatiya Minorities Suraksha Mahasangh | 9,871 | 0.00 | 0 |
| Socialist Party (Lohia) | 9,712 | 0.00 | 0 |
| Bharatiya Praja Paksha | 9,457 | 0.00 | 0 |
| Lok Bharati | 9,407 | 0.00 | 0 |
| Lok Vikas Party | 9,198 | 0.00 | 0 |
| Rajyadhikara Party | 9,005 | 0.00 | 0 |
| All India Dalit Welfare Congress | 8,961 | 0.00 | 0 |
| Meghalaya Democratic Party | 8,946 | 0.00 | 0 |
| Manav Mukti Morcha | 8,839 | 0.00 | 0 |
| Backward Classes Democratic Party, J&k | 8,129 | 0.00 | 0 |
| Bharatiya Eklavya Party | 8,105 | 0.00 | 0 |
| Akhil Bhartiya Rajarya Sabha | 8,065 | 0.00 | 0 |
| Rashtriya Raksha Dal | 7,915 | 0.00 | 0 |
| Jan Morcha | 7,826 | 0.00 | 0 |
| Democratic Bharatiya Samaj Party | 7,817 | 0.00 | 0 |
| Revolutionary Communist Party of India (Rakik Bhatt) | 7,788 | 0.00 | 0 |
| Bharatiya Gaon Taj Dal | 7,764 | 0.00 | 0 |
| Bundelkhand Akikrit Party | 7,593 | 0.00 | 0 |
| Ajeya Bharat Party | 7,567 | 0.00 | 0 |
| Indian Union Muslim League (IUML) | 7,553 | 0.00 | 0 |
| Purvanchal Rajya Banao Dal | 7,497 | 0.00 | 0 |
| Ambedkar Pragatisheel Republican Dal | 7,482 | 0.00 | 0 |
| The Humanist Party of India | 7,296 | 0.00 | 0 |
| Rashtriya Machhua Samaj Party | 7,290 | 0.00 | 0 |
| Bharatiya National Janta Dal | 7,194 | 0.00 | 0 |
| Hindustan Janata Party | 7,054 | 0.00 | 0 |
| B.C. United Front | 6,910 | 0.00 | 0 |
| Bharatiya Jantantrik Parishad | 6,872 | 0.00 | 0 |
| Ambedkarist Republican Party | 6,672 | 0.00 | 0 |
| Maharashtrawadi Gomantak Party | 6,638 | 0.00 | 0 |
| Proutist Sarva Samaj Party | 6,316 | 0.00 | 0 |
| Bharatiya Subhash Sena | 6,250 | 0.00 | 0 |
| Akhil Bharatiya Desh Bhakt Morcha | 6,220 | 0.00 | 0 |
| Party For Democratic Socialism | 6,141 | 0.00 | 0 |
| People's Party of Arunachal | 5,996 | 0.00 | 0 |
| Rashtriya Janhit Party | 5,841 | 0.00 | 0 |
| Vikas Party | 5,840 | 0.00 | 0 |
| Professionals Party of India | 5,819 | 0.00 | 0 |
| Republican Party of India (Democratic) | 5,809 | 0.00 | 0 |
| Duggar Pradesh Party | 5,660 | 0.00 | 0 |
| Bharat Vikas Morcha | 5,645 | 0.00 | 0 |
| Republican Party of India (Khobragade) | 5,566 | 0.00 | 0 |
| Bharatiya Samaj Dal | 5,565 | 0.00 | 0 |
| Samajtantric Party of India | 5,537 | 0.00 | 0 |
| Rashtrawadi Labour Party | 5,460 | 0.00 | 0 |
| National Loktantrik Party | 5,371 | 0.00 | 0 |
| Bharatiya Peoples Party | 5,226 | 0.00 | 0 |
| Bhartiya Lok Kalyan Dal | 5,197 | 0.00 | 0 |
| Sunder Samaj Party | 5,120 | 0.00 | 0 |
| Lal Morcha | 5,087 | 0.00 | 0 |
| Bharatiya Sampuran Krantikari Party | 5,068 | 0.00 | 0 |
| Jai Bharat Samanta Party | 4,967 | 0.00 | 0 |
| Samajik Jantantrik Party | 4,816 | 0.00 | 0 |
| Praja Bharath Party | 4,810 | 0.00 | 0 |
| Bharathiya Sahayog Congress | 4,758 | 0.00 | 0 |
| Sikkim Himali Rajya Parishad | 4,639 | 0.00 | 0 |
| Uttar Pradesh Republican Party | 4,604 | 0.00 | 0 |
| Rashtriya Mazdoor Ekta Party | 4,588 | 0.00 | 0 |
| Muslim Majlis Uttar Pradesh | 4,444 | 0.00 | 0 |
| Inqalab Vikas Dal | 4,439 | 0.00 | 0 |
| Awami Party | 4,386 | 0.00 | 0 |
| Bharatiya Jan Berojgar Chhatra Dal | 4,307 | 0.00 | 0 |
| Bharat Uday Mission | 4,210 | 0.00 | 0 |
| Rashtriya Agraniye Dal | 4,072 | 0.00 | 0 |
| Krantikari Samyavadi Party | 4,035 | 0.00 | 0 |
| Rashtriya Praja Congress (Secular) | 3,980 | 0.00 | 0 |
| Republican Presidium Party of India | 3,894 | 0.00 | 0 |
| Lok Jan Vikas Morcha | 3,658 | 0.00 | 0 |
| Peoples Democratic Front | 3,502 | 0.00 | 0 |
| Bharatiya Loktantrik Party (Gandhi-Lohiawadi) | 3,359 | 0.00 | 0 |
| Bharatiya Pichhra Dal | 3,292 | 0.00 | 0 |
| Rashtriya Naujawan Dal | 3,155 | 0.00 | 0 |
| Rashtra Bhakt Dal | 3,138 | 0.00 | 0 |
| Yuva Vikas Party | 3,129 | 0.00 | 0 |
| Jan Chetna Party | 2,987 | 0.00 | 0 |
| Sikkim Jan-Ekta Party | 2,849 | 0.00 | 0 |
| Bharatiya Samaj Kalyan Party Bharat | 2,822 | 0.00 | 0 |
| Bhartiya Pragatisheel Congress | 2,798 | 0.00 | 0 |
| National Development Party | 2,787 | 0.00 | 0 |
| Jan Ekta Dal | 2,787 | 0.00 | 0 |
| All India Momin Conference | 2,765 | 0.00 | 0 |
| All India Forward Bloc (Subhasist) | 2,758 | 0.00 | 0 |
| Rashtriya Sahara Party | 2,754 | 0.00 | 0 |
| Indian People's Forward Block | 2,686 | 0.00 | 0 |
| Alpjan Samaj Party | 2,678 | 0.00 | 0 |
| Ambedkarbadi Party | 2,664 | 0.00 | 0 |
| United National Loktantrik Party | 2,658 | 0.00 | 0 |
| Akhil Bharatiya Hind Kranti Party | 2,633 | 0.00 | 0 |
| Orissa Mukti Morcha | 2,591 | 0.00 | 0 |
| Youth and Students Party | 2,582 | 0.00 | 0 |
| Laghujan Samaj Vikas Party | 2,507 | 0.00 | 0 |
| Jharkhand People's Party | 2,498 | 0.00 | 0 |
| Democratic Congress Party | 2,497 | 0.00 | 0 |
| Savarn Samaj Party | 2,486 | 0.00 | 0 |
| Jansatta Party | 2,468 | 0.00 | 0 |
| Jai Chhattisgarh Party | 2,397 | 0.00 | 0 |
| Rastriya Samajwadi Party (Secular) | 2,305 | 0.00 | 0 |
| Moderate Party | 2,285 | 0.00 | 0 |
| Sikkim Gorkha Prajatantric Party | 2,284 | 0.00 | 0 |
| National Youth Party | 2,275 | 0.00 | 0 |
| Sardar Vallabhbhai Patel Party | 2,275 | 0.00 | 0 |
| Kannada Chalevali Vatal Paksha | 2,269 | 0.00 | 0 |
| Rashtriya Bahujan Congress Party | 2,244 | 0.00 | 0 |
| Bhartiya Deshbhakt Party | 2,217 | 0.00 | 0 |
| Rashtriya Jan Sahay Dal | 2,202 | 0.00 | 0 |
| Desia Pathukappu Kazhagam | 2,154 | 0.00 | 0 |
| Youth For Equality | 2,099 | 0.00 | 0 |
| Rajya Nojawan Shakti Party | 2,041 | 0.00 | 0 |
| Rashtriya Lokwadi Party | 2,021 | 0.00 | 0 |
| Rashtriya Janutthan Party | 2,005 | 0.00 | 0 |
| Rashtriya Lokhit Party | 1,866 | 0.00 | 0 |
| Indian Christian Secular Party | 1,853 | 0.00 | 0 |
| Mahila Adhikar Party | 1,816 | 0.00 | 0 |
| Rashtriya Gondvana Party | 1,802 | 0.00 | 0 |
| Rashtriya Mangalam Party | 1,780 | 0.00 | 0 |
| Indian Bahujan Samajwadi Party | 1,780 | 0.00 | 0 |
| Buddhiviveki Vikas Party | 1,774 | 0.00 | 0 |
| Advait Ishwasyam Congress | 1,718 | 0.00 | 0 |
| United Communist Party of India | 1,713 | 0.00 | 0 |
| Shivrajya Party | 1,704 | 0.00 | 0 |
| Karnataka Thamizhar Munnetra Kazhagam | 1,686 | 0.00 | 0 |
| Akhil Bhartiya Manavata Paksha | 1,619 | 0.00 | 0 |
| National Democratic Peoples Front | 1,557 | 0.00 | 0 |
| Bharatiya Backward Party | 1,552 | 0.00 | 0 |
| Rashtriya Surya Prakash Party | 1,532 | 0.00 | 0 |
| Jharkhand Party | 1,514 | 0.00 | 0 |
| Bharatiya Nagrik Party | 1,464 | 0.00 | 0 |
| Bahujan Vikas Party | 1,435 | 0.00 | 0 |
| Bharatiya Rashtravadi Paksha | 1,407 | 0.00 | 0 |
| Rashtriya Janadhikar Party | 1,394 | 0.00 | 0 |
| Majdoor Kisan Union Party | 1,341 | 0.00 | 0 |
| Kamarajar Deseeya Congress | 1,341 | 0.00 | 0 |
| Christian Democratic Front | 1,300 | 0.00 | 0 |
| Bharatiya Jan Shakti | 1,296 | 0.00 | 0 |
| Rayalaseema Rashtra Samithi | 1,284 | 0.00 | 0 |
| Bharatiya Jai Bheem Party | 1,253 | 0.00 | 0 |
| Bhartiya Chaitanya Party | 1,246 | 0.00 | 0 |
| Bharatiya Jan Kranti Dal (Democratic) | 1,245 | 0.00 | 0 |
| Punjab Labour Party | 1,243 | 0.00 | 0 |
| Swarajya Party of India | 1,230 | 0.00 | 0 |
| All India Bahujan Samman Party | 1,217 | 0.00 | 0 |
| Bundelkhand Mukti Morcha | 1,211 | 0.00 | 0 |
| Akhil Bharatiya Mahasand Sarvahara Krantikari Party | 1,197 | 0.00 | 0 |
| Anaithindia Dravidar Samudaya Munnetra Kazhagam | 1,189 | 0.00 | 0 |
| Save Goa Front | 1,117 | 0.00 | 0 |
| Namadhu Makkal Katchi | 1,114 | 0.00 | 0 |
| Akhil Bharatiya Shivsena Rashtrawadi | 1,108 | 0.00 | 0 |
| Maidani Kranti Dal | 1,106 | 0.00 | 0 |
| Jai Jawan Jai Kisan Mazdoor Congress | 1,100 | 0.00 | 0 |
| All India Bharti Jug Party | 1,085 | 0.00 | 0 |
| Bhartiya Congress (M) | 1,069 | 0.00 | 0 |
| Matra Bhakta Party | 1,006 | 0.00 | 0 |
| Pachai Kudi Makkal Katchi | 981 | 0.00 | 0 |
| Akhil Rashtrawadi Party | 969 | 0.00 | 0 |
| Vishva Hindustani Sangathan | 935 | 0.00 | 0 |
| Mool Bharati (S) Party | 910 | 0.00 | 0 |
| National Secular Party | 902 | 0.00 | 0 |
| Bharatiya Rashtriya Morcha | 867 | 0.00 | 0 |
| Vishwa Vikas Sangh | 837 | 0.00 | 0 |
| Jai Bharat Party | 836 | 0.00 | 0 |
| Bharat Ki Lok Jimmedar Party | 790 | 0.00 | 0 |
| Akhil Bhartiya Sindhu Samajwadi Party | 786 | 0.00 | 0 |
| Bharat Dal | 700 | 0.00 | 0 |
| Federal Congress of India | 684 | 0.00 | 0 |
| All India Raksha Party | 678 | 0.00 | 0 |
| Adarshwadi Dal | 614 | 0.00 | 0 |
| Janata Uday Party | 595 | 0.00 | 0 |
| Shakti Sena (Bharat Desh) | 589 | 0.00 | 0 |
| Rashtriya Vikas Party | 584 | 0.00 | 0 |
| Akhil Bhartiya Loktantra Party | 578 | 0.00 | 0 |
| Peoples Party of India(secular) | 578 | 0.00 | 0 |
| Niswarth Sewa Party | 573 | 0.00 | 0 |
| Jebamani Janata | 573 | 0.00 | 0 |
| Hind Vikas Party | 532 | 0.00 | 0 |
| Desh Bhakt Party | 531 | 0.00 | 0 |
| Bharatiya Sarvkalyan Krantidal | 496 | 0.00 | 0 |
| Democratic Party of India | 494 | 0.00 | 0 |
| Rajasthan Dev Sena Dal | 484 | 0.00 | 0 |
| Rashtriya Yuva Sangh | 482 | 0.00 | 0 |
| Rashtrawadi Samaj Party | 450 | 0.00 | 0 |
| Loktanrik Janata Party (Secular) | 351 | 0.00 | 0 |
| Bharatiya Grameen Dal | 346 | 0.00 | 0 |
| Akhil Bhartiya Kisan Mazdoor Morcha | 305 | 0.00 | 0 |
| Jaganmay Nari Sangathan | 226 | 0.00 | 0 |
| Independents | 21,647,686 | 5.19 | 9 |
| Nominated Anglo-Indians | | | 2 |
| Total | 417,159,281 | 100.00 | 545 |
| Valid votes | 417,159,281 | 99.95 | |
| Invalid/blank votes | 198,705 | 0.05 | |
| Total votes | 417,357,986 | 100.00 | |
| Registered voters/turnout | 716,985,101 | 58.21 | |
Source: ECI

== See also ==
- Results of the 2009 Indian general election by state
- Results of the 2009 Indian general election by parliamentary constituency
