= February 2005 Bihar Legislative Assembly election =

Election in India

- 3, 15 and 23 February 2005

243 Legislative Assembly seats
- Turnout: 46.50%
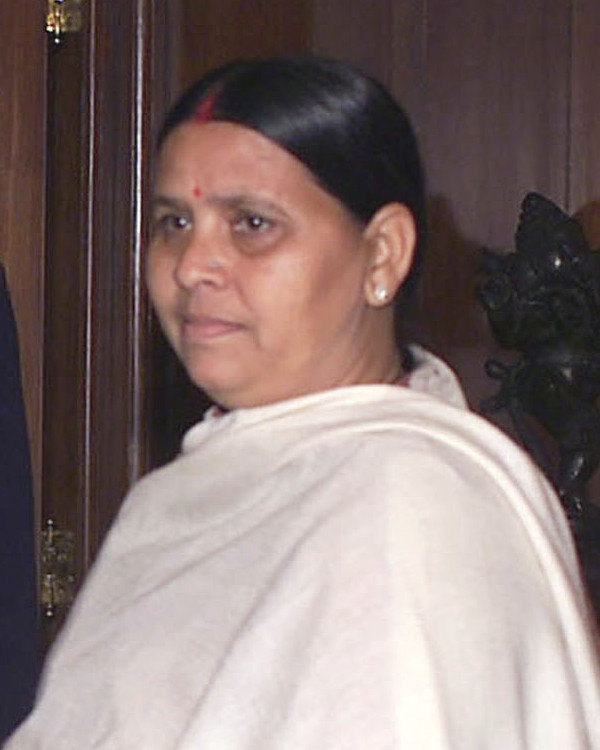

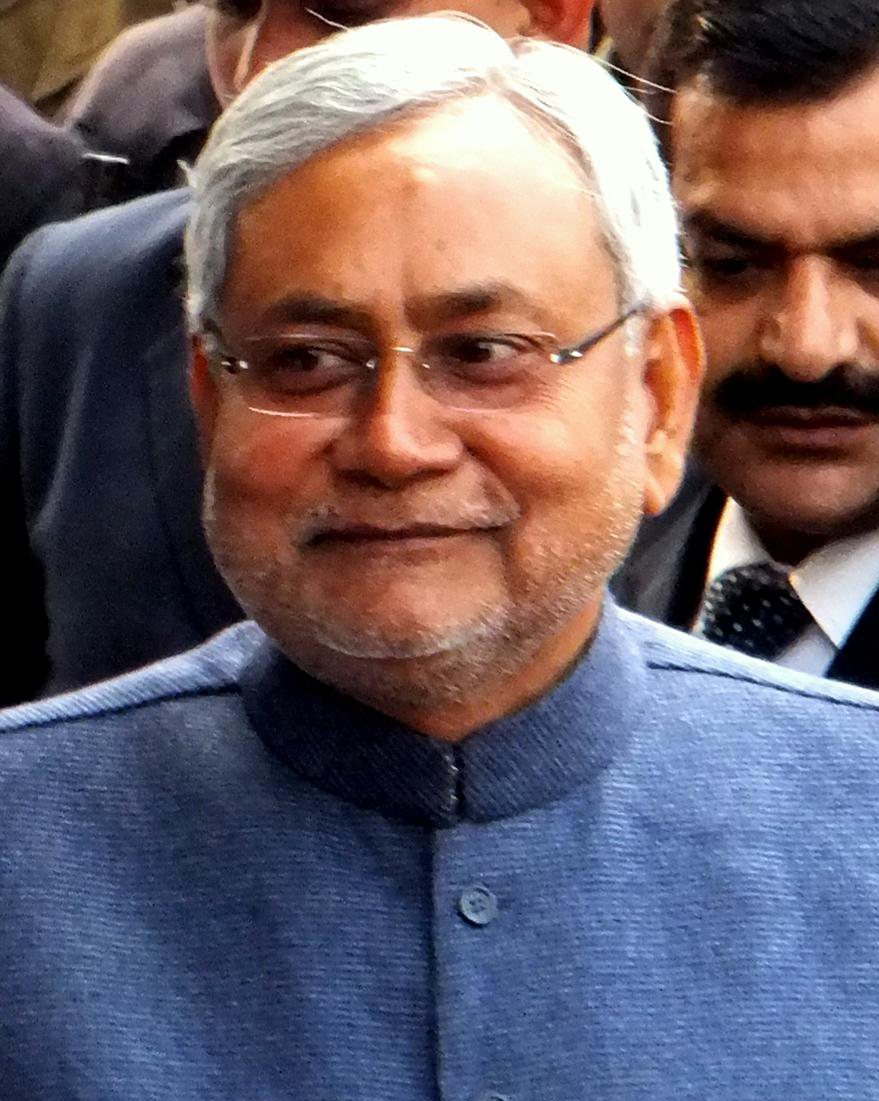

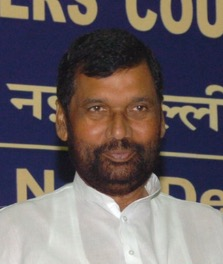

	Majority party	Minority party	Third party
			BJP
Leader	Rabri Devi	Nitish Kumar	Gopal Narayan Singh
Party	RJD	JD(U)	BJP
Alliance		NDA	NDA
Leader since	1997	2005	2003
Leader's seat	Raghopur	Did not contest	Did not contest
Last election	115	19	33
Seats won	75	55	37
Seat change	▼40	▲36	▲4
Popular vote	6,140,223	3,564,930	2,686,290
Percentage	25.07%	14.55%	10.97%
Swing	▼3.27%	▲8.08%	▼3.67%
	Fourth party	Fifth party
Leader	Ram Vilas Paswan	Ramjatan Sinha
Party	LJP	INC
Alliance	UPA	UPA
Leader since	2000	2003
Leader's seat	Did not contest	Did not contest
Last election	New	18
Seats won	29	10
Seat change	New	▼8
Popular vote	3,091,173	1,223,835
Percentage	12.62%	5.00%
Swing	New	▼6.06%
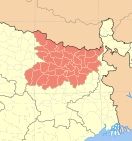
- District map of Bihar
Chief Minister before election
Rabri Devi
RJD
Elected Chief Minister
President's rule
Nonpartisan

Bihar Assembly elections were held twice in the year 2005. There was a fractured verdict in February 2005 Assembly Election. Since no government could be formed in Bihar, fresh elections were held in October–November the same year.

LJP and Congress formed an alliance, while talks failed with RJD, which left willing to let go of only sitting congress seats.

== Schedule ==
Poll Event and Place	Phase-I	Phase-II	Phase-III
Announcement	17.12.2004 (Friday)	17.12.2004 (Friday)	17.12.2004 (Friday)
Issue of notification	10.1.2005 (Monday)	20.1.2005 (Thursday)	29.1.2005 (Saturday)
Last Date for making nominations	17.1.2005 (Monday)	27.1.2005 (Thursday)	5.2.2005 (Saturday)
Scrutiny of nominations	18.1.2005 (Tuesday)	28.1.2005 (Friday)	7.2.2005 (Monday)
Last Date for withdrawal of candidature	20.1.2005 (Thursday)	31.1.2005 (Monday)	9.2.2005 (Wednesday)
Counting of Votes	27.2.2005 (Sunday)	27.2.2005 (Sunday)	27.2.2005 (Sunday)
Status	Done	Done	Done
Total No. of Assembly Constituencies			243
Assembly Constituencies reserved for Scheduled Castes			39
No. of Electors			5.27 crores
No. of Polling Booths			Estimated 50,063 Polling Booths.
Source: India Election

== Result ==
Source: ECI

Party	No. of candidates	No. of elected	No. of votes	% share
Rashtriya Janata Dal	210	75	6140223	25.07%
Janata Dal (United)	138	55	3564930	14.55%
Bharatiya Janata Party	103	37	2686290	10.97%
Lok Janshakti Party	178	29	3091173	12.62%
Indian National Congress	84	10	1223835	5.00%
Bahujan Samaj Party	238	2	1080745	4.41%
Communist Party of India	17	3	386236	1.58%
Communist Party of India	12	1	156656	0.64%
Nationalist Congress Party	31	3	240862	0.98%
Jharkhand Mukti Morcha	18	0	76671	0.31%
All India Forward Bloc	3	0	5555	0.03%
Communist Party of India (Marxist-Leninist) Liberation	109	7	610345	2.49%
Janata Dal	4	0	22428	0.09%
Indian Union Muslim League	1	0	4225	0.02%
Rashtriya Lok Dal	23	0	25618	0.10%
Shiv Sena	26	0	25698	0.10%
Samajwadi Party	142	4	658791	2.69%
Adarsh Political Party	1	0	736	0.00%
Akhil Bharatiya Ashok Sena	1	0	858	0.00%
Akhil Bharatiya Desh Bhakt Morcha	1	0	326	0.00%
Akhil Bharat Hindu Mahasabha	5	0	4603	0.02%
Akhil Bharatiya Jan Sangh	19	0	10990	0.04%
Apna Dal	64	0	73109	0.30%
All India Forward Bloc	1	0	27045	0.11%
Akhand Jharkhand People's Front	7	0	9800	0.04%
Awami Party	3	0	24400	0.10%
Bajjikanchal Vikas Party	4	0	4693	0.02%
Bharatiya Momin Front	3	0	2008	0.01%
Bharat Mangalam Parishad	1	0	397	0.00%
Federal Congress of India	2	0	1752	0.01%
Gondvana Ganatantra Party	1	0	1460	0.01%
Indian Justice Party	15	0	20227	0.08%
Indian Union Muslim League	1	0	758	0.00%
Jai Hind Party	1	0	1467	0.01%
Jai Jawan Jai Kisan Mazdoor Congress	7	0	6695	0.03%
Janata Party	2	0	1071	0.00%
Janhit Samaj Party	4	0	4770	0.02%
Jawan Kisan Morcha	5	0	2705	0.01%
Jharkhand Disom Party	10	0	18717	0.08%
Kamjor Varg Sangh, Bihar	1	0	1529	0.01%
Kosi Vikas Party	1	0	19267	0.08%
Krantikari Samyavadi Party	8	0	10327	0.04%
Lok Dal	3	0	1496	0.01%
Lok Sewa Dal	3	0	1807	0.01%
Lokpriya Samaj Party	3	0	3438	0.01%
Loktantrik Samajwadi Party	1	0	1774	0.1%
Marxist Communist Party of India	3	0	3420	0.01%
National Loktantrik Party	5	0	4003	0.02%
Navbharat Nirman Party	1	0	2220	0.01%
Pragatisheel Manav Samaj Party	1	0	1011	0.00%
Proutist Sarva Samaj Party	3	0	3075	0.01%
Rashtravadi Janata Party	9	0	11227	0.05%
Rashtriya Garib Dal	2	0	1802	0.01%
Rashtriya Krantikari Samajwadi Party	4	0	3908	0.02%
Rashtriya Lok Seva Morcha	15	0	21571	0 09%
Rashtriya Samanta Dal	3	0	2891	0,01%
Rashtriya Swabhimaan Party	10	0	23122	0.09%
Samajwadi Jan Parishad	5	0	5466	0.02%
Samajwadi Janata Party	31	0	60528	0.25%
Samata Party	73	0	105438	0.43%
Sanatan Samaj Party	1	0	705	0.00%
Sarvhara Dal	1	0	1238	0.01%
Shoshit Samaj Dal	7	0	9303	0.04%
Shoshit Samaj Party	3	0	3729	0.02%
Suheldev Bhartiya Samaj Party	3	0	13655	0.06%
Independent politicians	1493	17	3957945	16.16%
Total	3193	243	24,494,763	

=== District wise results ===
District	Seats								
District	Seats	RJD	JD(U)	BJP	LJP	INC	CPML)	IND	OTH
Araria	6	1	1	3	—N/a	—N/a	—N/a	1	—N/a
Arwal	2	—N/a	—N/a	—N/a	2	—N/a	—N/a	—N/a	—N/a
Aurangabad	6	3	2	1	—N/a	—N/a	—N/a	—N/a	—N/a
Banka	5	3	1	—N/a	1	—N/a	—N/a	—N/a	—N/a
Begusarai	7	1	—N/a	1	1	—N/a	—N/a	2	2
Bhagalpur	7	3	2	1	—N/a	1	—N/a	—N/a	—N/a
Bhojpur	7	1	3	1	—N/a	—N/a	2	—N/a	—N/a
Buxar	4	1	1	1	—N/a	—N/a	—N/a	—N/a	1
Darbhanga	9	6	1	2	—N/a	—N/a	—N/a	—N/a	—N/a
East Champaran	11	3	3	4	1	—N/a	—N/a	—N/a	—N/a
Gaya	10	6	1	1	1	—N/a	—N/a	1	—N/a
Gopalganj	6	2	1	1	—N/a	—N/a	—N/a	—N/a	2
Jamui	4	1	1	—N/a	2	—N/a	—N/a	—N/a	—N/a
Jehanabad	3	1	—N/a	—N/a	1	—N/a	—N/a	1	—N/a
Kaimur	4	4	—N/a	—N/a	—N/a	—N/a	—N/a	—N/a	—N/a
Katihar	7	2	—N/a	—N/a	—N/a	2	1	—N/a	2
Khagaria	4	—N/a	1	—N/a	3	—N/a	—N/a	—N/a	—N/a
Kishanganj	3	1	—N/a	—N/a	—N/a	1	—N/a	1	—N/a
Lakhisarai	2	1	—N/a	1	—N/a	—N/a	—N/a	—N/a	—N/a
Madhepura	5	1	4	—N/a	—N/a	—N/a	—N/a	—N/a	—N/a
Madhubani	11	3	1	2	—N/a	1	—N/a	2	2
Munger	4	2	2	—N/a	—N/a	—N/a	—N/a	—N/a	—N/a
Muzaffarpur	11	5	3	—N/a	2	—N/a	—N/a	1	—N/a
Nalanda	9	—N/a	7	1	—N/a	1	—N/a	—N/a	—N/a
Nawada	5	1	—N/a	—N/a	1	1	—N/a	2	—N/a
Patna	13	3	4	4	1	—N/a	1	—N/a	—N/a
Purnia	7	1	1	2	1	1	—N/a	—N/a	1
Rohtas	7	2	2	2	—N/a	—N/a	1	—N/a	—N/a
Saharsa	4	—N/a	1	1	—N/a	—N/a	—N/a	2	—N/a
Samastipur	10	4	1	—N/a	3	1	—N/a	—N/a	1
Saran	10	2	2	1	2	—N/a	—N/a	3	—N/a
Sheikhpura	1	—N/a	—N/a	—N/a	—N/a	1	—N/a	—N/a	—N/a
Sheohar	1	1	—N/a	—N/a	—N/a	—N/a	—N/a	—N/a	—N/a
Sitamarhi	8	3	1	2	2	—N/a	—N/a	—N/a	—N/a
Siwan	8	3	1	1	—N/a	—N/a	2	1	—N/a
Supaul	5	1	3	—N/a	1	—N/a	—N/a	—N/a	—N/a
Vaishali	8	2	1	1	4	—N/a	—N/a	—N/a	—N/a
West Champaran	9	1	3	3	—N/a	—N/a	—N/a	—N/a	2
Total	243	75	55	37	29	10	7	17	13

== Results by Constituency ==
Constituency		Winner			Runner-up			Votes
Constituency		Candidate	Party	Votes	Candidate	Party	Votes	Votes
1	Dhanaha	Rajesh Singh	RJD	19,389	Ramadhar Yadav	SP	13,287	6,102
2	Bagha (SC)	Purnamasi Ram	JD(U)	59,151	Naresh Ram	RJD	27,481	31,670
3	Ramnagar	Chandra Mohan Rai	BJP	20,961	Fakhruddin Khan	LJP	20,711	250
4	Shikarpur (SC)	Subodh Kumar	NCP	30,421	Bhagirathi Devi	BJP	19,161	11,260
5	Sikta	Dilip Verma	SP	26,161	Khursid Alam	IND	19,504	6,657
6	Lauria	Pradeep Singh	JD(U)	21,775	Shambhu Tiwari	BSP	21,721	54
7	Chanpatia	Satish Chandra Dubey	BJP	27,642	Sharfuddin Shekh	SJP(R)	11,426	16,216
8	Bettiah	Renu Devi	BJP	48,559	Shamim Akhtar	IND	37,102	11,457
9	Nautan	Vaidyanath Prasad Mahto	JD(U)	29,252	Amar Yadav	RJD	20,910	8,342
10	Raxaul	Dr. Ajay Kumar Singh	BJP	23,640	Rajnandan Rai	IND	20,814	2,826
11	Sugauli	Vijayprasad Gupta	RJD	22,281	Ramashray Singh	CPI(M)	21,648	633
12	Motihari	Pramod Kumar	BJP	46,595	Rama Devi	RJD	33,258	13,337
13	Adapur	Shyam Bihari Prasad	JD(U)	38,025	Rambabu Prasad Yadav	RJD	18,362	19,663
14	Dhaka	Awaneesh Kumar Singh	BJP	32,738	Nek Mohammad	LJP	21,469	11,269
15	Ghorasahan	Lakshmi Narayan Prasad Yadav	RJD	26,644	Nek Mahammad	LJP	17,528	9,116
16	Madhuban	Rana Randhir	RJD	39,777	Shivjee Rai	JD(U)	36,586	3,191
17	Pipra (SC)	Krishna Nandan Paswan	BJP	37,758	Surendra Kumar Chandra	RJD	25,895	11,863
18	Kesariya	Obaidullah	JD(U)	26,234	Rajesh Kumar Raushan	RJD	17,286	8,948
19	Harsidhi	Awadhesh Prasad Kushwaha	LJP	36,755	Maheshwar Singh	JD(U)	28,791	7,964
20	Gobindganj	Mina Dviwedi	JD(U)	31,325	Rajan Tiwari	LJP	22,947	8,378
21	Kateya	Amrendra Kumar Pandey	BSP	49,087	Kiran Devi	RJD	31,957	17,130
22	Bhore (SC)	Anil Kumar	RJD	34,299	Surender Ram	LJP	17,464	16,835
23	Mirganj	Ramsewak Singh	JD(U)	19,442	Babuddin Khan	INC	12,827	6,615
24	Gopalganj	Reyazul Haque Alias 'Raju'	BSP	27,885	Subash Singh	LJP	24,587	3,298
25	Barauli	Rampravesh Rai	BJP	26,077	M. Nemtulah	RJD	20,919	5,158
26	Baikunthpur	Deo Dutt Prasad	RJD	36,095	Manjeet Kumar Singh	JD(U)	25,719	10,376
27	Basantpur	Manik Chand Rai	RJD	44,462	Sri Satyadeo Prasad Singh	BJP	28,362	16,100
28	Goreakothi	Bhumendra Naraian Singh	BJP	30,637	Indradeo Prasad	RJD	29,408	1,229
29	Siwan	Awadh Bihari Chaudhary	RJD	39,666	Vyasdeo Prasad	BJP	26,754	12,912
30	Mairwa (SC)	Satya Dev Ram	CPI(ML)	26,655	Shiv Kumar Manjhi	RJD	15,884	10,771
31	Darauli	Amar Nath Yadav	CPI(ML)	25,196	Sheo Shanker Yadav	RJD	23,624	1,572
32	Ziradei	Azazul Haque	RJD	31,757	Shyam Bahadur Singh	JD(U)	28,691	3,066
33	Maharajganj	Damodar Singh	JD(U)	39,293	Umashankar Singh	RJD	30,635	8,658
34	Raghunathpur	Jagmato Devi	IND	28,138	Qamarul Haque	IND	17,534	10,604
35	Manjhi	Gautam Singh	JD(U)	26,349	Rabindra Nath Mishra	INC	21,192	5,157
36	Baniapur	Manoranjan Singh	LJP	32,724	Ram Bahadur Rai	RJD	24,618	8,106
37	Masrakh	Tarkeshwar Singh	IND	28,250	Kedar Nath Singh	JD(U)	21,081	7,169
38	Taraiya	Janak Singh	LJP	22,241	Ramdas Roy	RJD	21,743	498
39	Marhaura	Lal Babu Ray	IND	29,424	Yadu Banshi Ray	RJD	18,457	10,967
40	Jalalpur	Janardan Singh 'Sigriwal'	BJP	28,192	Balagul Mobin	RJD	27,548	644
41	Chapra	Ram Parvash Rai	JD(U)	33,776	Udit Rai	RJD	31,527	2,249
42	Garkha (SC)	Raghunandan Manjhi	IND	28,787	Muneshwar Chaudhary	RJD	23,603	5,184
43	Parsa	Chandrika Ray	RJD	36,597	Chhotelal Rai	JD(U)	33,525	3,072
44	Sonepur	Ramanuj Prasad	RJD	47,680	Vinay Kumar Singh	BJP	37,129	10,551
45	Hajipur	Nityanand Roy	BJP	53,910	Rajendra Roy	LJP	24,974	28,936
46	Raghopur	Rabri Devi	RJD	48,680	Rajiv Ranjan	LJP	23,419	25,261
47	Mahnar	Rama Kishor Singh	LJP	42,597	Munshi Lal Rai	RJD	32,406	10,191
48	Jandaha	Achidanand Singh	LJP	39,993	Umesh Singh Kushwaha	RJD	24,644	15,349
49	Patepur (SC)	Mahendra Baitha	LJP	35,217	Prema Choudhary	RJD	33,679	1,538
50	Mahua (SC)	Shiv Chand Ram	RJD	34,738	Meena Devi	LJP	28,380	6,358
51	Lalganj	Vijay Kumar Shukla	LJP	48,614	Veena Devi	RJD	30,725	17,889
52	Vaishali	Brishin Patel	JD(U)	38,041	Veena Shahi	INC	36,204	1,837
53	Paru	Mithilesh Prasad Yadav	RJD	38,076	Ashok Kumar Singh	BJP	34,060	4,016
54	Sahebganj	Raju Kumar Singh	LJP	45,474	Ram Vichar Rai	RJD	32,874	12,600
55	Baruraj	Brij Kishor Singh	RJD	33,788	Shashi Kumar Rai	JD(U)	25,645	8,143
56	Kanti	Ajit Kumar	LJP	38,987	Md. Jamal	RJD	34,819	4,168
57	Kurhani	Manoj Kumar Singh	JD(U)	29,531	Basawan Prasad Bhagat	RJD	23,579	5,952
58	Sakra (SC)	Bilat Paswan	JD(U)	37,685	Dr. Shital Ram	RJD	30,338	7,347
59	Muzaffarpur	Vijendra Chaudhary	IND	50,884	Suresh Kumar Sharma	BJP	36,064	14,820
60	Bochaha (SC)	Ramai Ram	RJD	50,956	Shiv Nath Choudhary	JD(U)	33,432	17,524
61	Gaighatti	Maheshwar Pasad Yadav	RJD	31,969	Ashok Kumar Singh	JD(U)	21,077	10,892
62	Aurai	Arjun Ray	JD(U)	52,327	Ganesh Prasad Yadav	RJD	21,140	31,187
63	Minapur	Hind Keshari Yadav	RJD	32,849	Dinesh Prasad	JD(U)	30,992	1,857
64	Runisaidpur	Bhola Rai	RJD	29,924	Azam Hussain Anwar	LJP	26,148	3,776
65	Belsand	Sunita Singh	LJP	28,958	Ram Swarth Roy	RJD	21,753	7,205
66	Sheohar	Ajit Kumar Jha	RJD	26,409	Thakur Ratnakar	JD(U)	20,858	5,551
67	Sitamarhi	Sunil Kumar Alias Pintu	BJP	51,447	Mohammad Tahir	RJD	27,683	23,764
68	Bathnaha	Nagina Devi	LJP	30,797	Suryadeo Rai	RJD	26,378	4,419
69	Majorganj (SC)	Dinkar Ram	BJP	29,161	Lalita Devi	RJD	22,117	7,044
70	Sonbarsa	Dr. Ram Chandra Purbey	RJD	37,774	Md. Anwarul Haque	LJP	29,189	8,585
71	Sursand	Jai Nandan Prasad Yadav	RJD	26,012	Baidyanath Prasad	BJP	18,831	7,181
72	Pupri	Shahid Ali Khan	JD(U)	35,221	Nawal Kishore Rai	RJD	31,426	3,795
73	Benipatti	Yugeshwar Jha	INC	31,672	Shaligram Yadav	IND	22,529	9,143
74	Bisfi	Haribhushan Thakur	IND	17,942	Md. Ahmar Hassan	INC	16,473	1,469
75	Harlakhi	Ram Naresh Pandey	CPI	38,825	Sita Ram Yadav	RJD	31,967	6,858
76	Khajauli (SC)	Ram Prit Paswan	BJP	35,119	Ram Lakhan Ram Raman	RJD	25,706	9,413
77	Babubarhi	Uma Kant Yadav	RJD	38,568	Kapil Deb Kamat	JD(U)	31,674	6,894
78	Madhubani	Ram Deo Mahto	BJP	33,007	Raj Kumar Mahaseth	IND	24,324	8,683
79	Pandaul	Naiyar Azam	RJD	32,629	Vinod Naryan Jha	BJP	21,562	11,067
80	Jhanjharpur	Nitish Mishra	JD(U)	38,568	Jagdish Na. Chaudhary	RJD	22,529	16,039
81	Phulparas	Deo Nath Yadav	SP	41,299	Ram Kumar Yadav	RJD	18,632	22,667
82	Laukaha	Anis Ahmad	RJD	20,165	Hari Prasad Sah	JD(U)	18,923	1,242
83	Madhepur	Roop Narayan Jha	IND	23,445	Jagat Narayan Singh	RJD	17,035	6,410
84	Manigachhi	Prabhakar Choudhary	JD(U)	32,093	Lalit Kumar Yadav	RJD	27,576	4,517
85	Bahera	Abdul Bari Siddiqui	RJD	44,681	Mahendra Jha Azad	BJP	25,616	19,065
86	Ghanshyampur	Dr. Mahavir Prasad	RJD	35,110	Izhar Ahmad	LJP	28,730	6,380
87	Baheri	Harekrishna Yadav	RJD	44,770	Mohan Choudhary	LJP	35,684	9,086
88	Darbhanga Rural (SC)	Pitambar Paswan	RJD	34,392	Suniti Ranjan Das	LJP	23,900	10,492
89	Darbhanga	Sanjay Sarawagi	BJP	43,075	Md. Mumtaz Alam	RJD	28,887	14,188
90	Keoti	Ashok Ku. Yadav	BJP	39,100	Md. Mohsin	RJD	34,333	4,767
91	Jale	Ramniwas Pd.	RJD	25,597	Vijay Kumar Mishra	BJP	20,899	4,698
92	Hayaghat	Harinandan Yadav	RJD	23,737	Umakant Chodhary	JD(U)	17,198	6,539
93	Kalyanpur	Ashok Prasad Verma	RJD	36,848	Ashwamedh Devi	JD(U)	33,495	3,353
94	Warisnagar (SC)	Maheshwar Hajari	LJP	38,147	Sanjay Paswan	RJD	32,318	5,829
95	Samastipur	Ram Nath Thakur	JD(U)	53,202	Shahid Ahmad	RJD	29,965	23,237
96	Sarairanjan	Ram Chandra Singh Nishad	RJD	38,226	Sajan Kumar Mishra	LJP	28,750	9,476
97	Mohiuddin Nagar	Ajay Kumar Bulganin	LJP	53,872	Rana Gangeshwar Prasad Singh	JD(U)	29,482	24,390
98	Dalsinghsarai	Sheel Kumar Roy	LJP	52,497	Ram Lakhan Mahto	RJD	38,461	14,036
99	Bibhutpur	Ram Deo Verma	CPI(M)	50,464	Ram Balak Singh	LJP	49,622	842
100	Rosera	Gajendra Prasad Singh	RJD	45,906	Ashok Kumar	JD(U)	30,984	14,922
101	Singhia (SC)	Dr. Ashok Kumar	INC	35,514	Ramotar Paswan	IND	16,973	18,541
102	Hasanpur	Sunil Kumar Puspam	RJD	31,397	Ram Narayan Mandal	LJP	25,092	6,305
103	Balia	Srinarayan Yadav	RJD	28,252	Jamshed Asraf	LJP	27,436	816
104	Matihani	Narender Kumar Singh	IND	54,016	Rajendra Rajan	CPI	26,703	27,313
105	Begusarai	Bhola Singh	BJP	32,052	Kamli Mahto	CPI	28,182	3,870
106	Barauni	Rajendra Prasad Singh	CPI	44,451	Padip Rai	LJP	39,532	4,919
107	Bachwara	Ramdeo Rai	IND	39,328	Awadhesh Kumar Rai	CPI	31,058	8,270
108	Cheria Bariarpur	Anil Choudhary	LJP	32,741	Radha Krishna Singh	RJD	32,235	506
109	Bakhri (SC)	Ram Binod Paswan	CPI	33,639	Ramanand Ram	RJD	19,207	14,432
110	Raghopur	Niraj Kumar Singh "Bablu"	JD(U)	27,601	Md. Zeyauddin	BSP	24,102	3,499
111	Kishunpur	Anirudha Prasad Yadav	JD(U)	42,696	Bijay Kumar Gupta	LJP	22,203	20,493
112	Supaul	Bijendra Prasad Yadav	JD(U)	35,498	Israil Rayeen	RJD	33,420	2,078
113	Tribeniganj	Vishwa Mohan Kumar	LJP	38,606	Anup Lal Yadav	RJD	31,744	6,862
114	Chhatapur (SC)	Mahendra Narayan Sardar	RJD	32,303	Vishwa Mohan Bharti	JD(U)	30,860	1,443
115	Kumarkhand (SC)	Amit Kumar Bharti	RJD	27,729	Nepali Rajak	JD(U)	22,539	5,190
116	Singheshwar	Rameshwar Prasad Yadav	JD(U)	35,006	Dinesh Kumar Yadav	RJD	27,990	7,016
117	Saharsa	Sanjiv Kumar Jha	BJP	43,638	Surya Narayan Yadav	RJD	34,232	9,406
118	Mahishi	Surendra Yadav	IND	40,417	Dr. Abdul Ghafoor	RJD	25,489	14,928
119	Simri-Bakhtiarpur	Dinesh Chandra Yadav	JD(U)	52,572	Choudhary Mahboob Ali Kaiser	INC	29,932	22,640
120	Madhepura	Manindra Kumar Mandal	JD(U)	30,293	Chandrashekhar Yadav	IND	19,583	10,710
121	Sonbarsa	Kishor Kumar	IND	50,117	Ashok Kumar Singh (Biratpur)	RJD	30,160	19,957
122	Kishanganj	Renu Kumari	JD(U)	33,992	Prof. Ravindra Charan Yadav	RJD	19,757	14,235
123	Alamnagar	Narendra Nr. Yadav	JD(U)	24,808	Chandeshwari Singh	IND	14,357	10,451
124	Rupauli	Shanker Singh	LJP	25,717	Beema Bharti	RJD	19,604	6,113
125	Dhamdaha	Leshi Singh	JD(U)	40,587	Dileep Kumar Yadav	RJD	31,284	9,303
126	Banmankhi (SC)	Krishna Kumar Rishi	BJP	31,723	Manorama Devi	RJD	22,077	9,646
127	Raniganj (SC)	Parmanand Rishidev	BJP	31,468	Ashok Paswan	LJP	24,180	7,288
128	Narpatganj	Anil Kumar Yadav	RJD	24,949	Janardan Yadav	BJP	24,580	369
129	Forbesganj	Laxmi Narayan Mehta	BJP	63,654	Zakir Hussain Khan	RJD	56,384	7,270
130	Araria	Pradeep Kumar Singh	BJP	32,580	Moidur Rahman	INC	31,937	643
131	Sikti	Murlidhar Mandal	IND	32,887	Aftab Azim	LJP	24,710	8,177
132	Jokihat	Manzar Alam	JD(U)	51,804	Sarfraz Alam	RJD	27,220	24,584
133	Bahadurganj	Md. Toushif Alam	IND	43,524	Jahidur Rahman	INC	15,456	28,068
134	Thakurganj	Md. Jawaid	INC	27,560	Tarachandra Dhanuka	SP	27,381	179
135	Kishanganj	Akhtarul Iman	RJD	35,220	Sanjeev Kumar Yadav	BJP	33,216	2,004
136	Amour	Abdul Jalil Mastan	INC	48,009	Saba Zafar	IND	25,373	22,636
137	Baisi	Abdus Subhan	RJD	26,913	Syed Ruknudin	IND	22,968	3,945
138	Kasba	Md. Afaque Alam	SP	33,749	Pradip Kumar Das	BJP	29,721	4,028
139	Purnea	Raj Kishore Keshri	BJP	30,006	Ram Charitra Yadav	SP	28,832	1,174
140	Korha (SC)	Sunita Devi	INC	52,930	Mahesh Paswan	BJP	27,485	25,445
141	Barari	Muhammad Sakur	NCP	18,542	Vibhash Chand Choudhary	BJP	18,070	472
142	Katihar	Ram Prakash Mahto	RJD	33,064	Raj Banshi Singh	BJP	26,333	6,731
143	Kadwa	Abdul Zalil	NCP	35,289	Bhola Roy (Sonaili)	BJP	14,523	20,766
144	Barsoi	Mahbub Alam	CPI(ML)	45,451	Dulal Chandra Goswami	BJP	24,611	20,840
145	Pranpur	Mahendra Narayan Yadav	RJD	24,993	Raj Kumar Mandal	NCP	13,577	11,416
146	Manihari	Mubaraque Hussain	INC	21,149	Sagir Ahmad	NCP	15,729	5,420
147	Pirpainti	Shobha Kant Mandal	RJD	28,085	Ambika Prasad	CPI	25,357	2,728
148	Colgong	Sadanand Singh	INC	51,152	Raj Kumar Singh	JD(U)	21,591	29,561
149	Nathnagar	Sudha Srivastava	JD(U)	37,784	Prawej Khan	RJD	34,472	3,312
150	Bhagalpur	Ashwani Kumar Chubey	BJP	53,765	Ajeet Sharma	INC	33,555	20,210
151	Gopalpur	Amit Rana	RJD	54,338	Narendra Ku. Niraj	JD(U)	41,206	13,132
152	Bihpur	Shalaish Kumar Alias Bulo Mandal	RJD	49,115	Ashok Kumar Sharma	BJP	23,905	25,210
153	Sultanganj (SC)	Sudhanshu Shekhar Bhaskar	JD(U)	50,827	Ganesh Paswan	RJD	44,507	6,320
154	Amarpur	Surendra Prasad Singh	RJD	31,428	Veda Nand Singh	JD(U)	25,109	6,319
155	Dhuraiya (SC)	Bhudeo Choudhary	JD(U)	47,625	Naresh Das	CPI	37,834	9,791
156	Banka	Jawed Iqbal Ansari	RJD	30,886	Ram Narayan Mandal	BJP	28,982	1,904
157	Belhar	Ramdeo Yadav	RJD	25,405	Janardan Manjhi	JD(U)	14,900	10,505
158	Katoria	Rajkishore Prasad Alias Pappu Yadav	LJP	27,356	Janardan Yadav	RJD	26,567	789
159	Chakai	Abhay Singh	LJP	27,948	Phalguni Prasad Yadav	BJP	23,329	4,619
160	Jhajha	Damodar Rawat	JD(U)	26,184	Rashid Ahmad	RJD	21,254	4,930
161	Tarapur	Shakuni Choudhary	RJD	34,643	Rajeev Kumar Singh	JD(U)	28,829	5,814
162	Kharagpur	Shanti Devi	RJD	58,052	Ananta Kumar Satyarthi	JD(U)	20,991	37,061
163	Parbatta	Ramanand Prasad Singh	JD(U)	47,932	Rakesh Kumar	RJD	46,014	1,918
164	Chautham	Sunita Sharma	LJP	28,691	Pannalal Singh 'Patel'	JD(U)	24,024	4,667
165	Khagaria	Poonam Devi (Yadav)	LJP	40,317	Chandramukhi Devi	BJP	31,296	9,021
166	Alauli (SC)	Pashupati Kumar Paras	LJP	39,951	Mira Devi	RJD	30,240	9,711
167	Monghyr	Dr. Monazir Hassan	JD(U)	63,222	Rinki Devi	IND	23,680	39,542
168	Jamalpur	Shailesh Kumar	JD(U)	45,536	Upendra Pd. Verma	RJD	23,986	21,550
169	Surajgarha	Prahlad Yadav	RJD	33,856	Prem Ranjan Patel	BJP	28,617	5,239
170	Jamui	Vijay Prakash	RJD	63,611	Arjun Mandal	LJP	41,538	22,073
171	Sikandra (SC)	Rameshwar Paswan	LJP	64,122	Prayag Choudhary	RJD	32,933	31,189
172	Lakhisarai	Vijay Kumar Sinha	BJP	27,554	Fulena Singh	RJD	26,106	1,448
173	Sheikhpura	Sunila Devi	INC	32,198	Rinku Devi	JD(U)	15,785	16,413
174	Barbigha (SC)	Ashok Chaudhary	INC	40,319	Mithalesh Kumar	JD(U)	27,348	12,971
175	Asthawan	Jitendra Kumar	JD(U)	31,387	Dr. Kumar Pushpanjay	RJD	28,176	3,211
176	Bihar	Dr. Sunil Kumar	JD(U)	74,752	Syed Naushadan Nabi	RJD	42,939	31,813
177	Rajgir (SC)	Satyadeo Narain Arya	BJP	29,324	Arjun Paswan Alias Ajay Paswan	CPI	19,614	9,710
178	Nalanda	Sharwan Kumar (Vill-Ben)	JD(U)	33,115	Ram Naresh Singh	AIFB(S)	27,045	6,070
179	Islampur	Ramswaroop Prasad	JD(U)	40,749	Rakesh Kumar Roshan	CPI	20,689	20,060
180	Hilsa	Ramcharitra Prasad Singh	JD(U)	34,698	Rajesh Kumar Singh Alias Raju Yadav	RJD	28,526	6,172
181	Chandi	Harinarayan Singh	JD(U)	32,767	Anil Singh	RJD	19,244	13,523
182	Harnaut	Sunil Kumar	JD(U)	45,909	Sudhir Kumar	LJP	10,962	34,947
183	Mokameh	Anant Kumar Singh	JD(U)	35,783	Nalini Ranjan Sharma	LJP	33,914	1,869
184	Barh	Lovely Anand	JD(U)	26,014	Yogendra Prasad Yadav	IND	18,602	7,412
185	Bakhtiarpur	Anirudh Kumar	RJD	33,828	Binod Yadav	BJP	28,684	5,144
186	Fatwa (SC)	Saryug Paswan	JD(U)	38,373	Dwarika Paswan	RJD	28,221	10,152
187	Masaurhi	Punam Devi	JD(U)	36,219	Raj Kishore Prasad	IND	21,232	14,987
188	Patna West	Navin Kishore Pd. Sinha	BJP	1,03,462	Ram Ishwar Prasad Alias Sadhu Gope	RJD	30,953	72,509
189	Patna Central	Arun Kumar Sinha	BJP	77,536	Ram Jatan Sinha	INC	26,219	51,317
190	Patna East	Nand Kishor Yadav	BJP	62,746	Anil Kumar Yadav	RJD	29,993	32,753
191	Dinapur	Asha Devi	BJP	40,354	Dr. Ramanand Yadav	RJD	32,690	7,664
192	Maner	Srikant Nirala	RJD	37,911	Sacchidanand Rai	JD(U)	29,517	8,394
193	Phulwari (SC)	Shyam Rajak	RJD	56,009	Uday Kumar	JD(U)	39,143	16,866
194	Bikram	Anil Kumar	LJP	46,150	Chandrama Singh Yadav	RJD	35,859	10,291
195	Paliganj	Nand Kumar Nanda	CPI(ML)	22,389	Dinanath Singh Yadav	RJD	19,115	3,274
196	Sandesh	Rameshwar Prasad	CPI(ML)	33,834	Vijendra Kumar Yadav	RJD	31,071	2,763
197	Barhara	Asha Devi	JD(U)	34,010	Raghvendra Pratap Singh	RJD	29,919	4,091
198	Arrah	Amrendra Pratap Singh	BJP	42,761	D. Nawaj Alam	RJD	28,514	14,247
199	Shahpur	Shivanand Tiwari	RJD	36,085	Dharmpal Singh	LJP	26,103	9,982
200	Brahmpur	Ajit Choudhary	RJD	33,632	Narvadeshwar Tiwari	BJP	29,455	4,177
201	Buxar	Prof. Sukhda Pandey	BJP	33,245	Hridaya Narayan Singh	IND	21,520	11,725
202	Rajpur (SC)	Shyam Pyari Devi	JD(U)	21,843	Santosh Kumar Nirala	BSP	20,288	1,555
203	Dumraon	Dadan Singh	SP	28,544	Anuradha Devi	AP	19,125	9,419
204	Jagdishpur	Shree Bhagwan Singh	JD(U)	29,495	Hari Narayan Singh	RJD	21,464	8,031
205	Piro	Narendra Kumar Panday	JD(U)	54,767	Keshav Prasad Singh	RJD	19,088	35,679
206	Sahar (SC)	Ram Naresh Ram	CPI(ML)	46,288	Rambabu Paswan	RJD	12,248	34,040
207	Karakat	Arun Singh	CPI(ML)	35,953	Tulsi Singh	RJD	29,274	6,679
208	Bikramganj	Akhlaque Ahmad	RJD	39,965	Jai Kumar Singh	JD(U)	29,344	10,621
209	Dinara	Ram Dhani Singh	JD(U)	32,443	Arun Kumar Singh	BSP	29,665	2,778
210	Ramgarh	Jagdanand Singh	RJD	56,582	Israr Khan	BSP	32,065	24,517
211	Mohania (SC)	Suresh Pasi	RJD	29,365	Chhedi Paswan	JD(U)	29,040	325
212	Bhabhua	Dr. Pramod Kumar Singh	RJD	28,743	Anand Bhusan Pandey	BSP	25,554	3,189
213	Chainpur	Mahabali Singh	RJD	39,988	Brij Kishore Vind	BSP	37,762	2,226
214	Sasaram	Jawahar Prasad	BJP	43,956	Dr. Ashok Kumar	RJD	33,917	10,039
215	Chenari (SC)	Lalan Paswan	JD(U)	51,741	Mahendra Ram	RJD	30,206	21,535
216	Nokha	Rameshwar Prasad	BJP	36,183	Ramji Choudhary	RJD	29,248	6,935
217	Dehri	Md. Ilyas Hussain	RJD	46,196	Radha Krishna Singh	LJP	23,940	22,256
218	Nabinagar	Bhim Kumar Singh	RJD	46,136	Virendera Kumar Singh	JD(U)	39,458	6,678
219	Deo (SC)	Renu Devi	JD(U)	32,677	Suresh Paswan	RJD	26,919	5,758
220	Aurangabad	Ramadhar Singh	BJP	68,726	Baijnath Mehta	RJD	45,001	23,725
221	Rafiganj	Md. Nehaluddin	RJD	40,277	Brijmohan Singh	JD(U)	15,782	24,495
222	Obra	Satya Narayan Singh	RJD	38,575	Raja Ram Singh	CPI(ML)	34,700	3,875
223	Goh	Dr. Ranvijay Kumar	JD(U)	27,812	Kaukab Kadari	INC	21,953	5,859
224	Arwal	Dularchand Singh	LJP	28,864	Veena Devi	RJD	18,983	9,881
225	Kurtha	Suchitra Sinha	LJP	43,736	Mahesh Prasad Yadav	RJD	41,894	1,842
226	Makhdumpur	Ramashray Prasad Singh	LJP	44,050	Bagi Kumar Varma	RJD	39,479	4,571
227	Jahanabad	Sachita Nand Yadav	RJD	42,729	Gopal Sharma	LJP	29,289	13,440
228	Ghosi	Jagdish Sharma	IND	55,262	Ajay Singh	RJD	30,389	24,873
229	Belaganj	Surendra Prasad Yadav	RJD	59,154	Md. Amjad	LJP	35,911	23,243
230	Konch	Dr. Anil Kumar	LJP	39,052	Mahesh Singh Yadav	RJD	33,509	5,543
231	Gaya Mufassil	Awadhesh Kumar Singh	IND	57,403	Dr. Binod Kumar Yadvendu	RJD	32,263	25,140
232	Gaya Town	Prem Kumar	BJP	42,967	Masood Manjar	CPI	22,380	20,587
233	Imamganj (SC)	Uday Narayan Chaudhary	JD(U)	24,454	Ram Swarup Paswan	RJD	23,183	1,271
234	Gurua	Shakeel Ahmad Khan	RJD	48,966	Veer Bhadra Yashraj	LJP	33,973	14,993
235	Bodh Gaya (SC)	Phoolchand Manjhi	RJD	45,164	Mauji Ram	LJP	21,766	23,398
236	Barachatti (SC)	Vijay Kumar	RJD	53,455	Vijay Paswan	JD(U)	24,243	29,212
237	Fatehpur (SC)	Ajay Paswan	RJD	36,231	Shyam Deo Paswan	LJP	29,685	6,546
238	Atri	Rajendra Prasad Yadav	RJD	63,921	Ramashray Pd. Singh	SP	36,732	27,189
239	Nawada	Purnima Yadav	IND	53,995	Raj Ballabh Prasad	RJD	43,914	10,081
240	Rajauli (SC)	Nand Kishore Choudhary	RJD	34,272	Banwari Ram	LJP	32,346	1,926
241	Gobindpur	Kaushal Yadav	IND	65,224	Prof. K. V. Prasad	JD(U)	10,492	54,732
242	Warsaliganj	Aruna Devi	LJP	60,999	Pradip Kumar	IND	52,283	8,716
243	Hisua	Aaditya Singh	INC	32,354	Ganesh Shankar Vidyarthi	CPI(M)	15,070	17,284

== See also ==
- October 2005 Bihar Legislative Assembly election
- 2000 Bihar Legislative Assembly election
- Elections in Bihar
- Politics in Bihar
- K. J. Rao
