= K. J. (given name) =

The initials K. J. are used by several noted people. This is often an abbreviation for their first and middle names, but can also be used when their first name starts with K, and the 'J' stands for Junior suffix (as in K. J. Hamler), or can even be the legal first name. As it is often an abbreviation, it has no actual meaning.

== Notable people with the given name "K. J." ==
=== A ===
- K. J. Adams Jr. (born 2002), American basketball player

=== B ===
- K. J. Baby (born 1954), Indian writer
- K. J. Bishop (born 1972), Australian writer
- KJ Bolden (born 2006), American football player
- K. J. Brent (born 1993), American football player
- K. J. Britt (born 1999), American football player

=== C ===
- K. J. Callahan, American politician
- K. J. Carta-Samuels (born 1995), American football player
- K. J. Choi (born 1970), South Korean golfer
- K. J. Costello (born 1997), American football player

=== D ===
- K. J. Dillon (born 1993), American football player

=== G ===
- K. J. Gabrielsson (1861–1901), Swedish poet
- K. J. George (born 1949), Indian politician
- K. J. George (Kerala politician) (1934–2020), Indian politician
- K. J. Gerard (born 1986), American football player

=== H ===
- K. J. Hamler (born 1999), American football player
- K. J. Harrison (born 1996), American baseball player
- KJ Henry (born 1999), American football player
- K. J. Hill (born 1997), American football player
- K. J. Hippensteel (born 1980), American tennis player

=== J ===
- K. J. Jackson (born 1998), American basketball player
- KJ Jackson (born 2006), American football player
- KJ Jefferson (born 2001), American football player
- K. J. Joseph (1931–2019), Malaysian teacher
- K. J. Joy, Indian musician

=== K ===
- K. J. Kapil Dev (born 1978), Indian volleyball player
- K. J. Hamida Khanam (1940–2015), Bangladeshi politician
- K. J. Kindler (born 1970), American gymnastics coach

=== L ===
- K. J. Manoj Lal (born 1978), Indian runner
- K. J. Lawson (born 1996), American basketball player
- K. J. Ray Liu (born 1961), Chinese-American scientist

=== M ===
- K. J. Maura (born 1995), Puerto Rican basketball player
- K. J. Maye (born 1994), American football player
- K. J. Maxi (born 1962), Indian politician
- K. J. McDaniels (born 1993), American basketball player
- K. J. McDonald (1930–2012), American politician

=== N ===
- K. J. Noons (born 1982), American mixed martial artist

=== O ===
- K. J. Osborn (born 1997), American football player

=== P ===
- K. J. Popma (1903–1986), Dutch philosopher

=== R ===
- K. J. Rao (born 1942), Indian politician
- K. J. Robinson (born 1998), American basketball player

=== S ===
- K. J. Simpson (born 2001), American basketball player
- K. J. Singh, Indian audio engineer
- K. J. G. Sirelius (1818–1888), Finnish missionary
- K. J. V. Steenstrup (1842–1913), Danish geologist
- K. J. Stroud (born 1989), American football player
- K. J. Stevens (born 1973), American writer

=== W ===
- K. J. Wall, American judge
- KJ Williams (born 1999), American basketball player
- K. J. Wright (born 1989), American football player

== See also ==
- KJ (disambiguation), a disambiguation page for "KJ"
