= Arbinstone Marak =

Indian politician

Arbinstone B. Marak (born 1974) is an Indian politician from Meghalaya. He is a member of the Meghalaya Legislative Assembly from Selsella Assembly constituency, which is reserved for Scheduled Tribe community, in West Garo Hills district. He was first elected in the 2023 Meghalaya Legislative Assembly election representing the National People's Party (India).

== Early life and education ==
Marak is from Baklagre village, Haldibari post, Tura, West Garo Hills District, Meghalaya. He is the son of the late Pitter A. Sangma. He completed his B.A. in 2011 at Kazi and Zaman College, New Bhaitbari, which is affiliated with North-Eastern Hill University, Shillong. He is a former member of the Garo Hills Autonomous district council, Tura. His wife is a government employee.

== Career ==
Marak made his debut in electoral politics, winning the Selsella Assembly constituency representing the National People's Party (India) in the 2023 Meghalaya Legislative Assembly election. He polled 16,595 votes and defeated his nearest rival, Agassi R. Marak of the All India Trinamool Congress, by a margin of 8,741 votes.
