= Kamraj =

Kamraj can refer to:

- K. Kamaraj (1903–1975), also Kamraj or Kamarajar, Indian politician, Chief Minister of Tamil Nadu (then Madras State)
  - Kamarajar Deseeya Congress, a political party in India
  - Virudhunagar district, also Kamarajar district, Tamil Nadu, India
  - Kamaraj (film), a 2004 Indian film
- Kamraj Kesari, Indian cricketer
- Kamraj, a colloquial term for the plant Helminthostachys zeylanica

== See also ==
- Rajadhi Raja Raja Kulothunga Raja Marthanda Raja Gambeera Kathavaraya Krishna Kamarajan, a 1993 Indian film by Balu Anand
