= Ferlin =

Ferlin is both a given name and a surname.

Notable people with the given name include:

- Ferlin Husky (1925–2011), American singer
- Ferlin C. A. Sangma, Indian politician

Notable people with the surname include:

- Brian Ferlin (born 1992), American ice hockey player
- Klemen Ferlin (born 1989), Slovenian handball player
- Nils Ferlin (1898–1961), Swedish poet and lyricist
