= 2005 Bihar Legislative Assembly election =

2005 Bihar Legislative Assembly election could refer to:

- February 2005 Bihar Legislative Assembly election
- October 2005 Bihar Legislative Assembly election
