= Results of the 2009 Indian general election by state =

Indian lower house election in

Results of the 2009 Indian general election by state / union territory.

== Number of votes ==
State / Union Territory	Congress	BJP	Bahujan Samaj	Communist (Marxist)	Inde- pendent	Samajwadi	Trinamool Congress	Telugu Desam	Nationalist Congress	DMK	Others	Total	Registered Electors	Turnout %
Andhra Pradesh	16,377,782	1,577,499	384,614	532,229	1,383,640	3,936		10,481,348			11,305,872	42,046,920	57,897,654	72.62%
Arunachal Pradesh	255,866	186,103			3,168						55,505	500,642	735,799	68.04%
Assam	4,235,681	1,967,813		84,610	921,379	25,376			28,089		4,878,223	12,141,171	17,470,161	69.50%
Bihar	2,486,999	3,376,109	1,071,794	124,007	2,937,305				294,469		13,940,711	24,231,394	54,491,790	44.47%
Chhattisgarh	3,192,007	3,851,970	386,872	11,667	842,655						269,472	8,554,643	15,472,137	55.29%
Goa	127,494	252,694			11,827				131,363		40,877	564,255	1,020,794	55.28%
Gujarat	7,579,920	8,128,840	282,761	32,430	832,856	78,624			52,501		484,933	17,472,865	36,484,290	47.89%
Haryana	3,407,291	986,136	1,284,067	18,999	214,084	8,398			24,969		2,212,609	8,156,553	12,087,679	67.48%
Himachal Pradesh	1,226,933	1,333,774	42,810	20,664	39,991	2,120					23,998	2,690,290	4,606,674	58.40%
Jammu & Kashmir	643,175	485,303	80,909		163,790	2,036					1,232,122	2,607,335	6,573,118	39.67%
Jharkhand	1,372,639	2,515,265	321,571	49,407	1,016,099	47,046	12,563				3,801,228	9,135,818	17,875,221	51.11%
Karnataka	9,250,984	10,228,790	407,648	18,328	1,014,670	33,099			22,274		3,596,920	24,572,713	41,526,941	59.17%
Kerala	6,434,486	1,011,563	205,337	4,887,333	611,810		1,606		115,191		2,767,549	16,034,875	21,865,458	73.33%
Madhya Pradesh	7,820,333	8,465,524	1,140,044	5,537	957,495	551,341					544,334	19,484,608	38,082,678	51.16%
Maharashtra	7,253,634	6,721,644	1,785,643	197,576	2,983,078	371,209			7,131,175		10,547,302	36,991,261	72,928,907	50.72%
Manipur	575,393	127,146			24,267				79,849		532,744	1,339,399	1,735,979	77.16%
Meghalaya	368,801				21,322				154,476		277,967	822,566	1,277,739	64.38%
Mizoram	213,779				108,913				3,299			325,991	629,384	51.80%
Nagaland	349,203						8,174				832,224	1,189,601	1,321,878	89.99%
Orissa	5,816,904	2,999,520	337,916	71,582	413,030	50,955			274,988		7,797,089	17,761,984	27,194,864	65.31%
Punjab	5,350,377	1,190,144	680,048	17,147	274,446	17,494					4,299,648	11,829,304	16,958,378	69.75%
Rajasthan	8,461,157	6,557,727	604,355	225,068	1,669,786	58,130					355,300	17,931,523	37,060,003	48.39%
Sikkim	74,483	4,458			3,687						169,123	251,751	300,584	83.75%
Tamil Nadu	4,567,799	711,790	232,583	669,058	1,149,313	23,155	755			7,625,397	15,411,148	30,390,998	41,642,466	72.98%
Tripura	540,753	59,457		1,084,883	35,698		9,695		3,118		24,897	1,758,501	2,082,265	84.45%
Uttar Pradesh	10,113,553	9,696,024	15,191,044	10,700	2,504,643	12,884,968	2,164		138,455		4,865,556	55,407,107	116,033,151	47.75%
Uttarakhand	1,354,468	1,061,358	478,394	5,562	86,126	57,316			5,168		91,653	3,140,045	5,887,628	53.33%
West Bengal	5,749,051	2,625,250	435,942	14,145,045	1,314,585	52,698	13,321,029		36,831		5,049,877	42,730,308	52,486,980	81.41%
Andaman & Nicobar	72,221	75,211	789	7,190	2,561				4,696		7,435	170,103	265,110	64.16%
Chandigarh	161,042	102,075	61,434		6,433						12,573	343,557	524,444	65.51%
Dadra & Nagar Haveli	50,624	51,242	1,385		7,112							110,363	154,212	71.57%
Daman & Diu	19,708	44,546			1,246	380			2,144			68,024	95,382	71.32%
Delhi	3,285,353	2,026,876	307,232		63,817	16,357					53,412	5,753,047	11,097,892	51.84%
Lakshadweep	20,492	245							18,294			39,031	45,983	84.88%
Pondicherry	300,391	13,442	3,697		26,013						264,405	607,948	762,440	79.74%
Total	119,110,776	78,435,538	25,728,889	22,219,022	21,646,845	14,284,638	13,355,986	10,481,348	8,521,349	7,625,397	95,746,706	417,156,494	716,676,063	58.21%

== Percentage of votes ==
State / Union Territory	Congress	BJP	Bahujan Samaj	Communist (Marxist)	Inde- pendent	Samajwadi	Trinamool Congress	Telugu Desam	Nationalist Congress	DMK	Others	Total
Andhra Pradesh	38.95%	3.75%	0.91%	1.27%	3.29%	0.01%		24.93%			26.89%	100.00%
Arunachal Pradesh	51.11%	37.17%			0.63%						11.09%	100.00%
Assam	34.89%	16.21%		0.70%	7.59%	0.21%			0.23%		40.18%	100.00%
Bihar	10.26%	13.93%	4.42%	0.51%	12.12%				1.22%		57.53%	100.00%
Chhattisgarh	37.31%	45.03%	4.52%	0.14%	9.85%						3.15%	100.00%
Goa	22.60%	44.78%			2.10%				23.28%		7.24%	100.00%
Gujarat	43.38%	46.52%	1.62%	0.19%	4.77%	0.45%			0.30%		2.78%	100.00%
Haryana	41.77%	12.09%	15.74%	0.23%	2.62%	0.10%			0.31%		27.13%	100.00%
Himachal Pradesh	45.61%	49.58%	1.59%	0.77%	1.49%	0.08%					0.89%	100.00%
Jammu & Kashmir	24.67%	18.61%	3.10%	0.00%	6.28%	0.08%					47.26%	100.00%
Jharkhand	15.02%	27.53%	3.52%	0.54%	11.12%	0.51%	0.14%				41.61%	100.00%
Karnataka	37.65%	41.63%	1.66%	0.07%	4.13%	0.13%			0.09%		14.64%	100.00%
Kerala	40.13%	6.31%	1.28%	30.48%	3.82%		0.01%		0.72%		17.26%	100.00%
Madhya Pradesh	40.14%	43.45%	5.85%	0.03%	4.91%	2.83%					2.79%	100.00%
Maharashtra	19.61%	18.17%	4.83%	0.53%	8.06%	1.00%			19.28%		28.51%	100.00%
Manipur	42.96%	9.49%			1.81%				5.96%		39.77%	100.00%
Meghalaya	44.84%				2.59%				18.78%		33.79%	100.00%
Mizoram	65.58%				33.41%				1.01%			100.00%
Nagaland	29.35%				0.00%		0.69%				69.96%	100.00%
Orissa	32.75%	16.89%	1.90%	0.40%	2.33%	0.29%			1.55%		43.90%	100.00%
Punjab	45.23%	10.06%	5.75%	0.14%	2.32%	0.15%					36.35%	100.00%
Rajasthan	47.19%	36.57%	3.37%	1.26%	9.31%	0.32%					1.98%	100.00%
Sikkim	29.59%	1.77%		0.00%	1.46%						67.18%	100.00%
Tamil Nadu	15.03%	2.34%	0.77%	2.20%	3.78%	0.08%				25.09%	50.71%	100.00%
Tripura	30.75%	3.38%		61.69%	2.03%		0.55%		0.18%		1.42%	100.00%
Uttar Pradesh	18.25%	17.50%	27.42%	0.02%	4.52%	23.26%			0.25%		8.78%	100.00%
Uttarakhand	43.14%	33.80%	15.24%	0.18%	2.74%	1.83%			0.16%		2.92%	100.00%
West Bengal	13.45%	6.14%	1.02%	33.10%	3.08%	0.12%	31.17%		0.09%		11.82%	100.00%
Andaman & Nicobar	42.46%	44.21%	0.46%	4.23%	1.51%				2.76%		4.37%	100.00%
Chandigarh	46.87%	29.71%	17.88%		1.87%						3.66%	100.00%
Dadra & Nagar Haveli	45.87%	46.43%	1.25%		6.44%							100.00%
Daman & Diu	28.97%	65.49%			1.83%	0.56%			3.15%			100.00%
Delhi	57.11%	35.23%	5.34%		1.11%	0.28%					0.93%	100.00%
Lakshadweep	52.50%	0.63%							46.87%			100.00%
Pondicherry	49.41%	2.21%	0.61%		4.28%						43.49%	100.00%
Total	28.55%	18.80%	6.17%	5.33%	5.19%	3.42%	3.20%	2.51%	2.04%	1.83%	22.95%	100.00%

322	159	62
UPA	NDA	Others

== 2009 LS Seats ==
State / Union Territory	Congress	BJP	Bahujan Samaj	Communist (Marxist)	Inde- pendent	Samajwadi	Trinamool Congress	Telugu Desam	Nationalist Congress	DMK	Others	Total
Andhra Pradesh	33							6			3	42
Arunachal Pradesh	2											2
Assam	7	4									3	14
Bihar	2	12			2						24	40
Chhattisgarh	1	10										11
Goa	1	1										2
Gujarat	11	15										26
Haryana	9										1	10
Himachal Pradesh	1	3										4
Jammu & Kashmir	2				1						3	6
Jharkhand	1	8			2						3	14
Karnataka	6	19									3	28
Kerala	13			4							3	20
Madhya Pradesh	12	16	1									29
Maharashtra	17	9			1				8		13	48
Manipur	2											2
Meghalaya	1								1			2
Mizoram	1											1
Nagaland											1	1
Orissa	6										15	21
Punjab	8	1									4	13
Rajasthan	20	4			1							25
Sikkim											1	1
Tamil Nadu	8			1						18	12	39
Tripura				2								2
Uttar Pradesh	21	10	20		1	23					5	80
Uttarakhand	5											5
West Bengal	6	1		9	1		19				6	42
Andaman & Nicobar		1										1
Chandigarh	1											1
Dadra & Nagar Haveli		1										1
Daman & Diu		1										1
Delhi	7											7
Lakshadweep	1											1
Pondicherry	1											1
Total	206	116	21	16	9	23	19	6	9	18	100	543

== Alliance-wise ==
State / Union Territory	United Progressive Alliance		National Democratic Alliance		Third Front		Others	
Andhra Pradesh		33 / 42 (79%)		0 / 42 (0%)		8 / 42 (19%)		0 / 42 (0%)
Arunachal Pradesh		2 / 2 (100%)		0 / 2 (0%)		0 / 2 (0%)		0 / 2 (0%)
Assam		7 / 14 (50%)		5 / 14 (36%)		0 / 14 (0%)		2 / 14 (14%)
Bihar		6 / 40 (15%)		32 / 40 (80%)		0 / 40 (0%)		2 / 40 (5%)
Chhattisgarh		1 / 11 (9%)		10 / 11 (91%)		0 / 11 (0%)		0 / 11 (0%)
Goa		1 / 2 (50%)		1 / 2 (50%)		0 / 2 (0%)		0 / 2 (0%)
Gujarat		11 / 26 (42%)		15 / 26 (58%)		0 / 26 (0%)		0 / 26 (0%)
Haryana		9 / 10 (90%)		0 / 10 (0%)		1 / 10 (10%)		0 / 10 (0%)
Himachal Pradesh		1 / 4 (25%)		3 / 4 (75%)		0 / 4 (0%)		0 / 4 (0%)
Jammu & Kashmir		5 / 6 (83%)		0 / 6 (0%)		1 / 6 (17%)		0 / 6 (0%)
Jharkhand		3 / 14 (21%)		9 / 14 (64%)		0 / 14 (0%)		2 / 14 (14%)
Karnataka		6 / 28 (21%)		19 / 28 (68%)		0 / 28 (0%)		3 / 28 (11%)
Kerala		17 / 20 (85%)		0 / 20 (0%)		0 / 20 (0%)		3 / 13 (23%)
Madhya Pradesh		12 / 29 (41%)		16 / 29 (55%)		0 / 29 (0%)		1 / 29 (3%)
Maharashtra		25 / 48 (52%)		21 / 48 (44%)		0 / 48 (0%)		2 / 48 (4%)
Manipur		2 / 2 (100%)		0 / 2 (0%)		0 / 2 (0%)		0 / 2 (0%)
Meghalaya		2 / 2 (100%)		0 / 2 (0%)		0 / 2 (0%)		0 / 2 (0%)
Mizoram		1 / 1 (100%)		0 / 1 (0%)		0 / 1 (0%)		0 / 1 (0%)
Nagaland		0 / 1 (0%)		0 / 1 (0%)		0 / 1 (0%)		1 / 1 (100%)
Orissa		6 / 21 (29%)		0 / 21 (0%)		0 / 21 (0%)		15 / 21 (71%)
Punjab		8 / 13 (62%)		5 / 13 (38%)		0 / 13 (0%)		0 / 13 (0%)
Rajasthan		20 / 25 (80%)		4 / 25 (16%)		0 / 25 (0%)		0 / 25 (0%)
Sikkim		0 / 1 (0%)		0 / 1 (0%)		0 / 1 (0%)		1 / 1 (100%)
Tamil Nadu		20 / 39 (51%)		0 / 39 (0%)		7 / 39 (18%)		12 / 39 (31%)
Tripura		0 / 2 (0%)		0 / 2 (0%)		0 / 2 (0%)		2 / 2 (100%)
Uttar Pradesh		21 / 80 (26%)		11 / 80 (14%)		20 / 80 (25%)		24 / 80 (30%)
Uttarakhand		5 / 5 (100%)		0 / 5 (0%)		0 / 5 (0%)		0 / 5 (0%)
West Bengal		25 / 42 (60%)		1 / 42 (2%)		0 / 42 (0%)		15 / 42 (36%)
Andaman & Nicobar		0 / 1 (0%)		1 / 1 (100%)		0 / 1 (0%)		0 / 1 (0%)
Chandigarh		1 / 1 (100%)		0 / 1 (0%)		0 / 1 (0%)		0 / 1 (0%)
Dadra & Nagar Haveli		0 / 1 (0%)		1 / 1 (100%)		0 / 1 (0%)		0 / 1 (0%)
Daman & Diu		0 / 1 (0%)		1 / 1 (100%)		0 / 1 (0%)		0 / 1 (0%)
Delhi		7 / 7 (100%)		0 / 7 (0%)		0 / 7 (0%)		0 / 7 (0%)
Lakshadweep		1 / 1 (100%)		0 / 1 (0%)		0 / 1 (0%)		0 / 1 (0%)
Pondicherry		1 / 1 (100%)		0 / 1 (0%)		0 / 1 (0%)		0 / 1 (0%)
Total	▲44	262 / 543 (48%)	▼22	159 / 543 (29%)	▲37	37 / 543 (7%)	Steady	85 / 543 (16%)

=== Andaman and Nicobar Islands (1) ===
1
BJP

Party	Seats Won	Seat Change	Alliance
Bharatiya Janata Party 1 / 1 (100%)	1	▲1	National Democratic Alliance
Indian National Congress	0	▼1	United Progressive Alliance

=== Andhra Pradesh (42) ===
33	6	2	1
INC	TDP	TRS	AIMIM

Party	Seats Won	Seat Change	Alliance
Indian National Congress 33 / 42 (79%)	33	▲4	United Progressive Alliance
All India Majlis-E-Ittehadul Muslimeen 1 / 42 (2%)	1	Steady	United Progressive Alliance
Telugu Desam Party 6 / 42 (14%)	6	▲1	Third Front
Telangana Rashtra Samithi 2 / 42 (5%)	2	▼3	Third Front

=== Arunachal Pradesh (2) ===
2
INC

Party	Seats Won	Seat Change	Alliance
Indian National Congress 2 / 2 (100%)	2	▲2	United Progressive Alliance
Bharatiya Janata Party	0	▼2	National Democratic Alliance

=== Assam (14) ===
7	4	1	1	1
INC	BJP	AGP	AIUDF	BDF

Party	Seats Won	Seat Change	Alliance
Indian National Congress 7 / 14 (50%)	7	▼2	United Progressive Alliance
Bharatiya Janata Party 4 / 14 (29%)	4	▲3	National Democratic Alliance
Asom Gana Parishad 1 / 14 (7%)	1	▼1	National Democratic Alliance
All India United Democratic Front 1 / 14 (7%)	1	▲1	Others
Bodoland People's Front 1 / 14 (7%)	1	▲1	Others

=== Bihar (40) ===
20	12	4	1	1
JD(U)	BJP	RJD	INC	IND

Party	Seats Won	Seat Change	Alliance
Janata Dal (United) 20 / 40 (50%)	20	▲14	National Democratic Alliance
Bharatiya Janata Party 12 / 40 (30%)	12	▲19	National Democratic Alliance
Rashtriya Janata Dal 4 / 40 (10%)	4	▼18	Fourth Front
Indian National Congress 2 / 40 (5%)	2	▼2	United Progressive Alliance
Independent 2 / 40 (5%)	2	▲2	Others

=== Chandigarh (1) ===
1
INC

Name of Party	Seats won	Seat Change	Alliance
Indian National Congress 1 / 1 (100%)	1	Steady	United Progressive Alliance
Bharatiya Janata Party	0	Steady	National Democratic Alliance

=== Chhattisgarh (11) ===
10	1
BJP	INC

Name of Party	Seats won	Seat Change	Alliance
Bharatiya Janata Party 10 / 11 (91%)	10	Steady	National Democratic Alliance
Indian National Congress 1 / 11 (9%)	1	Steady	United Progressive Alliance

=== Dadra & Nagar Haveli (1) ===
1
BJP

Name of Party	Seats won	Seat Change	Alliance
Bharatiya Janata Party 1 / 1 (100%)	1	Steady	National Democratic Alliance
Indian National Congress	0	Steady	United Progressive Alliance

=== NCT of Delhi (7) ===
7
INC

Name of Party	Seats won	Seat Change	Alliance
Indian National Congress 7 / 7 (100%)	7	▲1	United Progressive Alliance
Bharatiya Janata Party	0	▼1	National Democratic Alliance

=== Goa (2) ===
1	1
INC	BJP

Name of Party	Seats won	Seat Change	Alliance
Indian National Congress 1 / 2 (50%)	1	Steady	United Progressive Alliance
Bharatiya Janata Party 1 / 2 (50%)	1	Steady	National Democratic Alliance

=== Gujarat (26) ===
15	11
BJP	INC

Name of Party	Seats won	Seat Change	Alliance
Bharatiya Janata Party 15 / 26 (58%)	15	▲1	National Democratic Alliance
Indian National Congress 11 / 26 (42%)	11	▼1	United Progressive Alliance

=== Haryana (10) ===
9	1
INC	HJC

Name of Party	Seats won	Seat Change	Alliance
Indian National Congress 9 / 10 (90%)	9	Steady	United Progressive Alliance
Bharatiya Janata Party	0	▼1	National Democratic Alliance
Haryana Janhit Congress (BL) 1 / 10 (10%)	1	▲1	Third Front

=== Himachal Pradesh (4) ===
3	1
BJP	INC

Name of Party	Seats won	Seat Change	Alliance
Bharatiya Janata Party 3 / 4 (75%)	3	Steady	National Democratic Alliance
Indian National Congress 1 / 4 (25%)	1	Steady	United Progressive Alliance

=== Jammu and Kashmir (6) ===
3	2	1
JKNC	INC	IND

Name of Party	Seats won	Seat Change	Alliance
Jammu & Kashmir National Conference 3 / 6 (50%)	3	▲1	United Progressive Alliance
Indian National Congress 2 / 6 (33%)	2	Steady	United Progressive Alliance
Independent 2 / 6 (33%)	1	Steady	Third Front

=== Jharkhand (14) ===
8	2	2	1	1
BJP	JVM	JMM	INC	IND

Party	Seats Won	Seat Change	Alliance
Bharatiya Janata Party 8 / 14 (57%)	8	▲7	National Democratic Alliance
Jharkhand Vikas Morcha (Prajatantrik) 1 / 14 (7%)	1	▲1	National Democratic Alliance
Jharkhand Mukti Morcha 2 / 14 (14%)	2	▼2	United Progressive Alliance
Indian National Congress 1 / 14 (7%)	1	▼5	United Progressive Alliance
Independent 2 / 14 (14%)	2	▲2	Others

=== Karnataka (28) ===
19	6	3
BJP	INC	JD(S)

Name of Party	Seats won	Seat Change	Alliance
Bharatiya Janata Party 19 / 28 (68%)	19	▲1	National Democratic Alliance
Indian National Congress 6 / 28 (21%)	6	▼2	United Progressive Alliance
Janata Dal (Secular) 3 / 28 (11%)	3	▲1	Others

=== Kerala (20) ===
13	4	3	1
INC	CPI(M)	IUML	KC(M)

Name of Party	Seats won	Seat Change	Alliance
Indian National Congress 13 / 20 (65%)	13	▲13	United Progressive Alliance
Indian Union Muslim League 2 / 20 (10%)	2	▲1	United Progressive Alliance
Kerala Congress (M) 1 / 20 (5%)	1	▲1	United Progressive Alliance
Communist Party of India (Marxist) 4 / 20 (20%)	4	▼9	Left Democratic Front

=== Lakshwadeep (1) ===
1
INC

Name of Party	Seats won	Seat Change	Alliance
Indian National Congress	1	▲1	United Progressive Alliance
Nationalist Congress Party	0	Steady	United Progressive Alliance
Janata Dal (United)	0	▼1	Others

=== Madhya Pradesh (29) ===
16	12	1
BJP	INC	BSP

Name of Party	Seats won	Seat Change	Alliance
Bharatiya Janata Party	16	▼9	National Democratic Alliance
Indian National Congress	12	▲8	United Progressive Alliance
Bahujan Samaj Party	1	▲1	Others

=== Maharashtra (48) ===
17	11	9	8	1	1	1
INC	SHS	BJP	NCP	BVA	SWP	IND

Party	Seats Won	Seat Change	Alliance
Indian National Congress	17	▲4	United Progressive Alliance
Nationalist Congress Party	8	▼1	United Progressive Alliance
Shiv Sena	11	▼1	National Democratic Alliance
Bharatiya Janata Party	9	▼4	National Democratic Alliance
Swabhimani Paksha	1	▲1	National Democratic Alliance
Bahujan Vikas Aaghadi	1	▲1	Others
Independent	1	Steady	Others

=== Manipur (2) ===
2
INC

Party	Seats Won	Seat Change	Alliance
Indian National Congress	2	▲1	United Progressive Alliance
People's Democratic Alliance	0	▼1	National Democratic Alliance

=== Meghalaya (2) ===
1	1
INC	NCP

Party	Seats Won	Seat Change	Alliance
Indian National Congress	1	▲1	United Progressive Alliance
Nationalist Congress Party	1	▲1	United Progressive Alliance

=== Mizoram (1) ===
1
INC

Party	Seats Won	Seat Change	Alliance
Indian National Congress	1	▲1	United Progressive Alliance
Mizo National Front	0	▼1	Others

=== Nagaland (1) ===
1
NPF

Party	Seats Won	Seat Change	Alliance
Naga People's Front	1	Steady	Others
Indian National Congress	0	Steady	United Progressive Alliance

=== Odisha (21) ===
14	6	1
BJD	INC	CPI

Party	Seats Won	Seat Change	Alliance
Biju Janata Dal	14	▲3	Third Front
Indian National Congress	6	▲4	United Progressive Alliance
Communist Party of India (Marxist)	1	▲1	Third Front

=== Puducherry (1) ===
1
INC

Party	Seats Won	Seat Change	Alliance
Indian National Congress	1	▲1	United Progressive Alliance
Pattali Makkal Katchi	0	▼1	Third Front
All India Anna Dravida Munnetra Kazhagam	0	Steady	Third Front

=== Punjab (13) ===
8	4	1
INC	SAD	BJP

Party	Seats Won	Seat Change	Alliance
Indian National Congress	8	▲6	United Progressive Alliance
Shiromani Akali Dal	4	▼4	National Democratic Alliance
Bharatiya Janata Party	1	▼2	National Democratic Alliance

=== Rajasthan (25) ===
20	4	1
INC	BJP	IND

Party	Seats Won	Seat Change	Alliance
Indian National Congress	20	▲16	United Progressive Alliance
Bharatiya Janata Party	4	▼17	National Democratic Alliance
Independent	1	▲1	Others

=== Sikkim (1) ===
1
SDF

Party	Seats Won	Seat Change	Alliance
Sikkim Democratic Front	1	Steady	Others
Indian National Congress	0	Steady	United Progressive Alliance

=== Tamil Nadu (39) ===
18	9	8	1	1	1	1
DMK	AIADMK	INC	VCK	MCMK	CPI	CPI(M)

Party	Seats Won	Seat Change	Alliance
Dravida Munnetra Kazhagam	18	▲2	United Progressive Alliance
All India Anna Dravida Munnetra Kazhagam	4	▲9	Third Front
Indian National Congress	1	▲1	United Progressive Alliance
Viduthalai Chiruthaigal Katchi	1	▲1	United Progressive Alliance
Marumalarchi Dravida Munnetra Kazhagam	1	▼3	Third Front
Communist Party of India	1	▼1	Third Front
Communist Party of India (Marxist)	1	▼1	Third Front

=== Tripura (2) ===
2
CPI(M)

Party	Seats Won	Seat Change	Alliance
Communist Party of India (Marxist)	2	Steady	Third Front
Indian National Congress	0	Steady	United Progressive Alliance

=== Uttar Pradesh (80) ===
23	21	20	10	5	1
SP	INC	BSP	BJP	RLD	IND

Party	Seats Won	Seat Change	Alliance
Samajwadi Party	23	▼12	Fourth Front
Indian National Congress	21	▲12	United Progressive Alliance
Bahujan Samaj Party	20	▲1	Third Front
Bharatiya Janata Party	10	Steady	National Democratic Alliance
Rashtriya Lok Dal	1	▼2	National Democratic Alliance
Independent	1	Steady	Others

=== West Bengal (42) ===
19	9	6	2	2	1	1	1
AITC	CPI(M)	INC	CPI	AIFB	RSP(C)	BJP	SUCI(C)

Party	Seats Won	Seat Change	Alliance
All India Trinamool Congress	19	▲18	United Progressive Alliance
Communist Party of India (Marxist)	9	▼17	Third Front
Indian National Congress	6	▲1	United Progressive Alliance
Communist Party of India	2	▼1	Third Front
All India Forward Bloc	2	▼1	Third Front
Revolutionary Socialist Party (India)	1	▲1	Third Front
Bharatiya Janata Party	1	▲1	National Democratic Alliance
Socialist Unity Centre of India (Communist)	1	▲1	Others

== See also ==
- Results of the 2009 Indian general election by party
- Results of the 2009 Indian general election by parliamentary constituency
