= Ferlin C. A. Sangma =

Indian politician and bureaucrat

Member of Meghalaya Legislative Assembly
- In office 23 May 2019 – 16 December 2022
- Preceded by: Clement Marak
- Constituency: Selsella

Personal details
- Born: Ferlin C. A. Sangma
- Party: National People's Party

Ferlin C. A. Sangma is an Indian politician and a former bureaucrat. She was elected to the Meghalaya Legislative Assembly from Selsella, Meghalaya in a by-election in 2019 as a member of the National People's Party. In 2022, ahead of the 2023 Meghalaya Legislative Assembly election, she along with 3 other MLAs joined the Bharatiya Janata Party.
