= Selsella Assembly constituency =

Legislative Assembly constituency in Meghalaya State, India

Coordinates: 25.68°N 90.02°E

Selsella
- Constituency No. 48 for the Meghalaya Legislative Assembly

Constituency details
- Country: India
- Region: Northeast India
- State: Meghalaya
- District: West Garo Hills
- Lok Sabha constituency: Tura
- Established: 1972
- Total electors: 36,217
- Reservation: ST

Member of Legislative Assembly
- 11th Meghalaya Legislative Assembly
- Incumbent Arbinstone B. Marak
- Party: NPP
- Alliance: NDA
- Elected year: 2023

Selsella is one of the 60 Legislative Assembly constituencies of Meghalaya state in India. It is part of West Garo Hills district and is reserved for candidates belonging to the Scheduled Tribes. It falls under Tura Lok Sabha constituency and its current MLA is Arbinstone B. Marak of National People's Party.

== Members of the Legislative Assembly ==
Election	Member	Party
1978	Girash Marak	All Party Hill Leaders Conference
1983	Atul C. Marak	Indian National Congress
1988	Atul C. Marak	Indian National Congress
1993	Atul C. Marak	Indian National Congress
1998	Cyprian R. Sangma	People's Democratic Movement
2003	Cyprian R. Sangma	Nationalist Congress Party
2005 By-election	Clement Marak	Indian National Congress
2008	Conrad Sangma	Nationalist Congress Party
2013	Clement Marak	Indian National Congress
2018	Clement Marak	Indian National Congress
2019 By-election	Ferlin C. A. Sangma	National People's Party
2023	Arbinstone Marak	National People's Party

== Election results ==
=== Assembly Election 2023 ===
2023 Meghalaya Legislative Assembly election: Selsella
Party	Candidate	Votes	%	±%
NPP	Arbinstone Marak	16,595	50.13%	▼4.77
AITC	Agassi R. Marak	7,854	23.72%	New
BJP	Ferlin C. A. Sangma	6,954	21.01%	▲17.47
INC	Reynold M Sangma	1,184	3.58%	▼36.10
Independent	Tengsrang Marak	206	0.62%	New
NOTA	None of the Above	179	0.54%	▲0.11
Margin of victory		8,741	26.40%	▲11.18
Turnout		33,106	91.41%	▲0.34
Registered electors		36,217		▲14.19
NPP hold		Swing	▼4.77	

=== Assembly By-election 2019 ===
2019 Meghalaya Legislative Assembly by-election: Selsella
Party	Candidate	Votes	%	±%
NPP	Ferlin C. A. Sangma	15,857	54.90%	▲23.04
INC	June Eliana R. Marak	11,461	39.68%	▼4.88
BJP	Adorsho Sangma	1,021	3.53%	▼4.82
UDP	Sayeedullah Nongrum	547	1.89%	▲1.46
NOTA	None of the Above	124	0.43%	▲0.03
Margin of victory		4,396	15.22%	▲2.52
Turnout		28,886	91.05%	▼2.11
Registered electors		31,717		▲4.35
NPP gain from INC		Swing	▲10.34	

=== Assembly Election 2018 ===
2018 Meghalaya Legislative Assembly election: Selsella
Party	Candidate	Votes	%	±%
INC	Clement Marak	12,619	44.56%	▼5.40
NPP	Ferlin C. A. Sangma	9,022	31.86%	▼9.33
Independent	Dilliram G. Marak	3,296	11.64%	New
BJP	Promod Koch	2,367	8.36%	New
AITC	Biplab A. Marak	276	0.97%	New
Independent	Droming Ch. Marak	276	0.97%	New
UDP	Chris Kabul A. Sangma	124	0.44%	New
NOTA	None of the Above	113	0.40%	New
Margin of victory		3,597	12.70%	▲3.93
Turnout		28,321	93.18%	▲0.56
Registered electors		30,394		▲17.14
INC hold		Swing	▼5.40	

=== Assembly Election 2013 ===
2013 Meghalaya Legislative Assembly election: Selsella
Party	Candidate	Votes	%	±%
INC	Clement Marak	12,004	49.95%	▲17.82
NPP	Conrad Sangma	9,897	41.19%	New
SP	Promod Koch	1,015	4.22%	New
NCP	Lalthantluanga D. Shira	571	2.38%	▼40.29
Independent	Atul C. Marak	543	2.26%	New
Margin of victory		2,107	8.77%	▼1.76
Turnout		24,030	92.62%	▼0.06
Registered electors		25,946		▲81.63
INC gain from NCP		Swing	▲7.29	

=== Assembly Election 2008 ===
2008 Meghalaya Legislative Assembly election: Selsella
Party	Candidate	Votes	%	±%
NCP	Conrad Sangma	5,648	42.66%	▲19.62
INC	Clement Marak	4,254	32.13%	▲7.45
UDP	Moses Ch Sangma	1,333	10.07%	▼7.53
Independent	Atul C. Marak	1,101	8.32%	New
Independent	Crebilson Marak	721	5.45%	New
BJP	Arjun Kr. Hajong	182	1.37%	▼5.94
Margin of victory		1,394	10.53%	▲8.89
Turnout		13,239	92.68%	▲20.85
Registered electors		14,285		▼7.76
NCP gain from INC		Swing	▲17.98	

=== Assembly By-election 2005 ===
2005 Meghalaya Legislative Assembly by-election: Selsella
Party	Candidate	Votes	%	±%
INC	Clement Marak	2,745	24.68%	▲0.90
NCP	Connad Kongkal Sangma	2,563	23.04%	▼2.23
UDP	Moses Ch. Sangma	1,957	17.59%	▲7.17
Independent	Atul C. Marak	1,798	16.16%	New
BJP	Ananda Koch	814	7.32%	▼1.99
Independent	Susantho R. Sangma	628	5.65%	New
Independent	Simon George S. Marak	413	3.71%	New
Margin of victory		182	1.64%	▲0.14
Turnout		11,123	71.83%	▼3.25
Registered electors		15,486		▲2.18
INC gain from NCP		Swing	▼0.59	

=== Assembly Election 2003 ===
2003 Meghalaya Legislative Assembly election: Selsella
Party	Candidate	Votes	%	±%
NCP	Cyprian R. Sangma	2,875	25.27%	New
INC	Atul C. Marak	2,705	23.77%	▼10.41
Independent	Moses Sangma	1,644	14.45%	New
UDP	Crebilson Marak	1,186	10.42%	▲1.38
Independent	Tairipson A. Sangma	1,153	10.13%	New
BJP	Irengsing A. Sangma	1,059	9.31%	New
Independent	Bhubani Hajong	612	5.38%	New
Margin of victory		170	1.49%	▼6.17
Turnout		11,378	75.07%	▼0.07
Registered electors		15,156		▲9.99
NCP gain from PDM		Swing	▼16.58	

=== Assembly Election 1998 ===
1998 Meghalaya Legislative Assembly election: Selsella
Party	Candidate	Votes	%	±%
PDM	Cyprian R. Sangma	4,333	41.85%	New
INC	Atul C. Marak	3,539	34.18%	▼13.80
Independent	Dilip Sangma	1,382	13.35%	New
UDP	Crebilson Marak	936	9.04%	New
GNC	Predingson Marak	164	1.58%	New
Margin of victory		794	7.67%	▲3.62
Turnout		10,354	77.68%	▼8.75
Registered electors		13,779		▲15.00
PDM gain from INC		Swing	▼6.13	

=== Assembly Election 1993 ===
1993 Meghalaya Legislative Assembly election: Selsella
Party	Candidate	Votes	%	±%
INC	Atul C. Marak	4,823	47.98%	▼1.10
HPU	Barthar Marak	4,416	43.93%	▲2.71
BJP	Jarnas Bangshal	813	8.09%	New
Margin of victory		407	4.05%	▼3.81
Turnout		10,052	85.78%	▲5.24
Registered electors		11,982		▲12.41
INC hold		Swing		

=== Assembly Election 1988 ===
1988 Meghalaya Legislative Assembly election: Selsella
Party	Candidate	Votes	%	±%
INC	Atul C. Marak	4,115	49.08%	▲6.18
HPU	Jarnas Bangshall	3,456	41.22%	New
Independent	Ponditram Koch	581	6.93%	New
Independent	Pijen Marak	86	1.03%	New
Margin of victory		659	7.86%	▼10.58
Turnout		8,384	81.84%	▲5.33
Registered electors		10,659		▲40.34
INC hold		Swing	▲6.18	

=== Assembly Election 1983 ===
1983 Meghalaya Legislative Assembly election: Selsella
Party	Candidate	Votes	%	±%
INC	Atul C. Marak	2,389	42.90%	▼6.14
APHLC	Predingson Marak	1,362	24.46%	▼26.51
HSPDP	Marquish Marak	1,033	18.55%	New
Independent	Nityanarayan Smchang	682	12.25%	New
Independent	Robert Clive Marak	103	1.85%	New
Margin of victory		1,027	18.44%	▲16.52
Turnout		5,569	77.17%	▲12.87
Registered electors		7,595		▲7.84
INC gain from APHLC		Swing	▼8.06	

=== Assembly Election 1978 ===
1978 Meghalaya Legislative Assembly election: Selsella
Party	Candidate	Votes	%	±%
APHLC	Girash Marak	2,170	50.96%	New
INC	William Cecil R. Marak	2,088	49.04%	▼27.52
Margin of victory		82	1.93%	▼60.61
Turnout		4,258	66.73%	▲18.86
Registered electors		7,043		▼12.04
APHLC gain from INC		Swing	▼25.59	

=== Assembly Election 1972 ===
1972 Meghalaya Legislative Assembly election: Selsella
Party	Candidate	Votes	%	±%
INC	William Cecil R Marak	2,550	76.55%	New
CPI	Rosendra Hajong	467	14.02%	New
Independent	Dol Ch Bai Snab	314	9.43%	New
Margin of victory		2,083	62.53%	
Turnout		3,331	46.97%	
Registered electors		8,007		
INC win (new seat)				

== See also ==
- List of constituencies of the Meghalaya Legislative Assembly
- Tura (Lok Sabha constituency)
- West Garo Hills district
