= Rashtriya Raksha Dal =

Rashtriya Raksha Dal (National Defence Party), a political party in India, mainly based in Punjab. The party was founded on 7 August 1999, and works for the conditions of army veterans. The All India General Secretary of the party is Lt. Col. Adish Pal Singh Jhabal.
