= K. J. Joseph =

Indo-Malaysian politician and teacher

Datuk K. J. Joseph
- Born: May 13, 1931; Kochi, Kerala, India
- Died: 24 January 2019 (aged 87); Sabah, Malaysia
- Occupations: Teacher, Businessman
- Known for: Founder of the La Salle School Parliament (Kota Kinabalu, Malaysia), Computerizing Malayalam texts, founding the Sabah Indian Congress
- Notable work: Olam

Datuk K. J. Joseph (13 May 1931 – 24 January 2019) was a Malaysian teacher, businessman and politician who founded the Sabah Indian Congress. In his later life, he became known for his contributions in creating and digitising Malayalam literature and resources, playing a major role in the development of the Olam online dictionary by contributing most of the corpus. He was the founder of the La Salle School Parliament in Kota Kinabalu, Malaysia and a senior Science schoolteacher both in that school as well as Sabah College until he and his wife, Datin Ritamma (1931-2017), a former principal of SM St. Michael, Penampang both retired from teaching in 1986.

== Early life and career ==
K. J. Joseph was born on 13 May 1931 in the island of Kumbalangi on the outskirts of Kochi. He was interested in politics from a young age, having joined the Quit India movement as a schoolboy when he was 12. During his time at the Teachers' Training College in Thiruvananthapuram, he was active in student government, becoming the school's "Education Minister" in the mock parliament, reportedly leading a major group education students in the Indian independence movement, and also attending two session of the Kerala Legislative Assembly. He would later immigrate to what was then the British Crown Colony of North Borneo, arriving in Jesselton (now Kota Kinabalu) in August 1959. After having attended the North Borneo Legislative Council, Joseph convinced the principal of La Salle, where he was teaching, in 1962 to form a school parliament to train future leaders and increase student interest in politics in response to the inevitable independence of North Borneo in what would become the country of Malaysia. As of 2015, La Salle was the only Malaysian school with such a system. The same year, he formed the Sabah Indian Congress in order to increase minority representation in the Sabah State Assembly. He eventually became the general secretary of the Sabah Alliance Party before resigning in 1974, to continue his teaching career.

== Malayalam digitisation, Olam, and death ==
Joseph started digitising Malayalam books in the late 1990s after his retirement, including dictionaries and the complete works of Changampuzha Krishna Pillai. One of his projects, the transcription of a public domain Malayalam dictionary, was eventually found by Kailash Nadh, the CTO of Zerodha, who incorporated the corpus into his project Olam. Joseph died on 24 January 2019 at the age of 88.
