= Clement Marak =

Indian politician

Clement Marak (born 1959) was an Indian politician from Meghalaya. He was a former three time member of the Meghalaya Legislative Assembly from the Selsella Assembly constituency, which was reserved for the Scheduled Tirbe community, in West Garo Hills district representing the Indian National Congress. He won the bypoll in 2005 and then two straight terms in 2013 and 2018.

== Early life ==
Marak was from Selsella, West Garo Hills district, Meghalaya. He was the son of the late Grohonsing Marak. He did his schooling at St. Antony's School, Shillong, and passed the HSLC examinations conducted by the Meghalaya Board of School Education in 1977. His son Agassi R Marak is also an MLA from Selsella. He had declared assets worth Rs.1 crore in 2008 and Rs.2 crore in 2018, in his affidavits to the Election Commission of India.

== Career ==
Marak first became an MLA winning the Selsella Assembly constituency in the 2005 byelection representing the Indian National Congress. He polled 2,745 votes and defeated his nearest rival, Connad Kongkal Sangma of the Nationalist Congress Party, by a margin of 182 votes. He lost to Conrad Sangma in the 2008 Meghalaya Legislative Assembly election by 1,394 votes. But he regained the Selsella seat 2013 and won again in 2018 twice defeating Sangma, who later became the chief minister of the state.

=== Death ===
Marak died on 9 October 2018 at a private hospital in Delhi following a cardiac arrest. He is sruvived by his wife and two sons.
