= New Bhaitbari =

Village in Meghalaya, India

Coordinates: 25.7900°N 89.9786°E

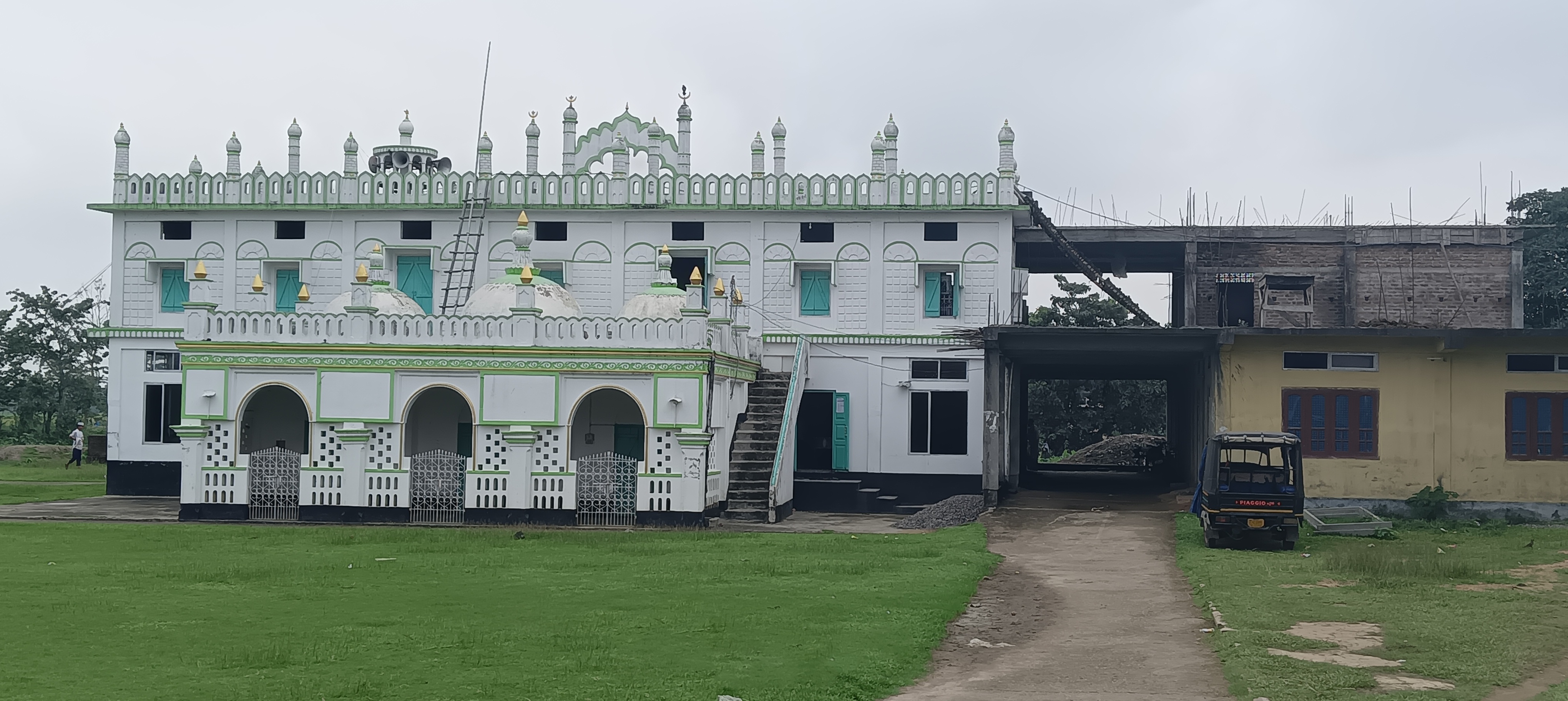
New Bhaitbari Markaz Mosque

New Bhaitbari is a populated place located in the east side of West Garo Hills district of Meghalaya, India. It is located at a distance of about 5km from the Brahmaputra River of Assam. A Public Health Centre is present in the centre of New Bhaitbari and also have a Zama Masjid on the market of New Bhaitbari

== Education ==
The main educational institutes in New Bhaitbari include the Bhaitbari Higher Secondary School and Kazi & Zaman College. Additionally, there are two primary and secondary schools at the heart of New Bhaitbari.

Bhaitbari is located around 240 kilometers away from Guwahati airport, the nearest airport, via NH17 and NH51. This small town is inhabited by people of all colors, faiths, and races namely Bengali, Garo, Koch and Hajong.
