= Janhit Samaj Party =

The Janhit Samaj Party is a political party in India. The party was founded in 2003 by Narendra Singh Kushwaha, the former President of Janta Party Bihar.

The party contested the 2004 Lok Sabha elections from Patna (Lok Sabha constituency) as well as the 2005 Bihar State Assembly Elections by three assembly seats.
