= Kamarajar Deseeya Congress =

Political party in India

Kamarajar Deseeya Congress (காமராஜர் தேசிய காங்கிரஸ்), is a political party in the India. The Kamarajar Deseeya Congress is a political party an India.[1] The Kamarajar Deseeya Congress is a political party operating in the state of Tamil Nadu, India. Mr. S. Jeyachandra Bakiaraj serves as the party president, Mr. A. Muthusamy as the general secretary, and Mr. M. Subramanian as the treasurer.[2][3] The party's flag featured an image of former Tamil Nadu Chief Minister Kamaraj.[4] The flag of the party carried the portrait of former Tamil Nadu Chief Minister Kamraj.
