= K. J. Rao =

Indian civil servant

- Born: Kommajosyula Jagannatha Rao; 1942 (age 83–84)
- Occupation: Civil servant (ECI)
- Known for: Observer for Bihar elections

Kommajosyula Jagannatha Rao (born 1942), known as K.J. Rao, is a former advisor to the Indian Election Commission. He was an election observer for 2005 Bihar elections.

== Career ==
K. J. Rao was a member of the investigation team that probed the malpractices in Amethi, the constituency of late Rajiv Gandhi, in 1989. He retired in 2002 but continued with the commission in various capacities. He also helped in weeding out bogus names from electoral lists in West Bengal.

In 2004 he was Election observer for President election in Afghanistan. He also refuted the claims of tampering with electronic voting machines (EVM) in 2009.
