= Krantikari Samyavadi Party =

Political party in India

Krantikari Samyavadi Party (translation: Revolutionary Communist Party) was an Indian political party in the state of Bihar, originated as a splinter group from Communist Party of India.

== History ==
In the 2000 Bihar Legislative Assembly election KSP won two seats backed by Lalu Prasad Yadav's RJD while contesting with seven candidates.

The relation with Rashtriya Janata Dal was later broken. In the Lok Sabha elections 2004 KSP had launched a candidate in Madhubani, who got 6948 votes (1% of the votes in that constituency). KSVP participates in the Confederation of Indian Communists and Democratic Socialists.
