= Loktantrik Samajwadi Party (India) =

Political party in India

- Abbreviation: LSWP
- Headquarters: 27-A, DDA Flats, Sundri Road, Darya Ganj, New Delhi – 110002

The Loktantrik Samajwadi Party is a minor political party in India. It was founded on 9 January 1994 in Patna by three senior MPs from the Janata Dal Party. These were Ram Sundar Das, Rasheed Masood, and Upendra Nath Verma.

== Electoral performance ==
The party contested 14 seats in the 1998 Lok Sabha (national parliament) elections. They also stood in the 1999, 2004, 2009, and 2014 elections, steadily dropping the number of seats contested. By 2014 they were contesting only two seats. They lost their deposits in every constituency contested in every election over that period.

The party won a seat in the 2008 state assembly election in Rajasthan.
