= Rashtriya Swabhiman Party =

Political party in India

The Rashtriya Swabhiman Party (RSP) is a political party in India, previously known as Lok Parivartan Party (LPP). Some of the members from the group are related to the Bahujan Samaj Swabhiman Sangharsh Samiti (BS-4).

LPP was formed by R.K. Chowdhury and B.R. Verma (former speaker in the Uttar Pradesh assembly), two leading members of Bahujan Samaj Party, (BSP). However, Chowdhury was forced out of BSP in 1998.

BS-4/RSP claim to represent the political current of Kanshi Ram, and claim that Kanshi Ram is more or less held captive by current Bahujan Samaj Party supremo Mayawati.

In the 2002 Uttar Pradesh state legislative assembly elections, LPP contested as an ally on Bharatiya Janata Party, (BJP). BJP allotted two seats for LPP, and one elected for Chowdhury. It merged with Congress on 5 April 2019.
