= Rashtravadi Janata Party =

Political party in India

Rashtrawadi Janta Party
- President: Anil Bharti

The Rashtravadi Janata Party (Nationalist Peoples Party), is a political party in India. The RJP is led by party president Anil Bharti.
