= Rashtriya Samanta Dal =

Rashtriya Samanata Dal, a political party in India, based in the Hindi belt. The party is led by Moti Lal Kushwaha "Shastri".

The party is based amongst the Khushwaha caste community.

In the 2003 Madhya Pradesh state assembly elections RSD contested as part of the Madhya Pradesh Jan Mukti Morcha.

In the 2004 Lok Sabha elections in Chhattisgarh RSD contested as a part of the Yuva Jan Kranti Morcha led by Lok Jan Shakti Party. Sujan Singh Bundela a 2 time Member of Parliament from Jhansi constituency left Indian National Congress after his ticket was cut and given to the sitting MLA, Pradeep Jain Aditya, of Jhansi. He is now contesting from Rashtriya Samanta Dal and filed his nomination on 6 April 2009.

After the grand victory of Bharatiya Janta Party in assembly elections of 2004 and 2009, the party is finding it difficult to sustain in Madhya Pradesh. In 2009 Madhya Pradesh Assembly Elections it only won 2 seats.
