= Jai Jawan Jai Kisan Mazdoor Congress =

Jai Jawan Jai Kisan Mazdoor Congress, a political party in India, launched on 10 December 2004 by former Bharatiya Janata Party general secretary Sunil Shastri son of Lal Bahadur Shastri.
