= Pragatisheel Manav Samaj Party =

Political party in Uttar Pradesh, India

Pragatisheel Manav Samaj Party (PMSP) is a political party in Uttar Pradesh, India. The PMSP is based amongst the Bind and Mallaah communities. The mafia don Brijesh Singh contested the 2012 Uttar Pradesh Assembly elections on a PMSP ticket, from Sayyadraja constituency.
