= 2024 Indian general election in the Andaman and Nicobar Islands =

2024 Indian general election in Andaman and Nicobar Islands

- 19 April 2024

1 Andaman and Nicobar Islands seat in the Lok Sabha
- Opinion polls
- Turnout: 64.1% (▼1.02 pp)
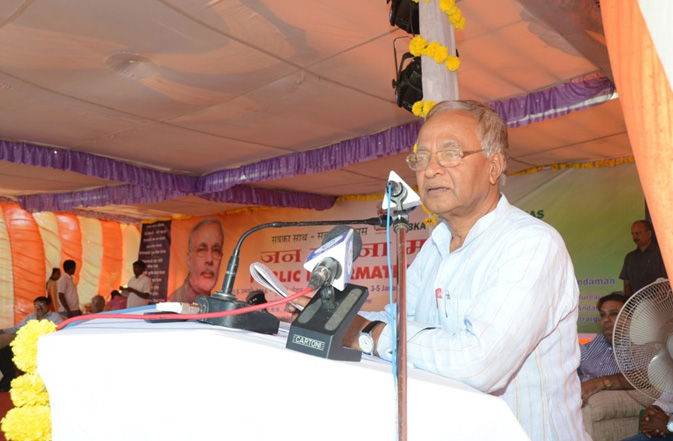

	First party	Second party
Leader	Bishnu Pada Ray	Kuldeep Rai Sharma
Party	BJP	INC
Alliance	NDA	INDIA
Leader since	2024	2019
Leader's seat	Andaman and Nicobar Islands	Andaman and Nicobar Islands (lost)
Last election	45.30%, 0 seat	45.98%, 1 seat
Seats won	1	0
Seat change	▲1	▼1
Popular vote	102,182	77,829
Percentage	50.59%	38.53%
Swing	▲5.29 pp	▼7.45 pp
- Result Map of the 2024 general election in Andaman & Nicobar Islands
Prime Minister before election
Narendra Modi
BJP
Prime Minister after election
Narendra Modi
BJP

The 2024 Indian general election was held on 19 April 2024 in the Andaman and Nicobar Islands to elect the 1 member of the 18th Lok Sabha. BJP candidate Bishnu Pada Ray won the only seat by defeating Congress's Kuldeep Rai Sharma

== Election schedule ==
Poll event	Phase
Poll event	I
Notification date	20 March 2024
Last date for filing nomination	27 March 2024
Scrutiny of nomination	28 March 2024
Last Date for withdrawal of nomination	30 March 2024
Date of poll	19 April 2024
Date of counting of votes/Result	4 June 2024
No. of constituencies	1

== Parties and alliances ==
=== National Democratic Alliance ===
National Democratic Alliance

Party	Flag	Symbol	Leader	Seats contested
Bharatiya Janata Party			Bishnu Pada Ray	1

=== Indian National Developmental Inclusive Alliance ===
Indian National Developmental Inclusive Alliance

Party	Flag	Symbol	Leader	Seats contested
Indian National Congress			Kuldeep Rai Sharma	1

=== Others ===
Party	Flag	Symbol	Leader	Seats contested
Bahujan Samaj Party			Arun Kumar Mallik	1
Communist Party of India (Marxist)			D. Ayyappan	1
All India Anna Dravida Munnetra Kazhagam			V. S. Baskaran	1
Socialist Unity Centre of India (Communist)			Salman Mustafa Mondal	1
Andaman Nicobar Democratic Congress		Coconut Farm	Manoj Paul	1
Total				5

== Candidates ==
Constituency							
Constituency		NDA		INDIA		Others	
1	Andaman and Nicobar Islands	BJP	Bishnu Pada Ray	INC	Kuldeep Rai Sharma	AIADMK	K. J. B. Selvaraj
1	Andaman and Nicobar Islands	BJP	Bishnu Pada Ray	INC	Kuldeep Rai Sharma	BSP	Arun Kumar Mallik
1	Andaman and Nicobar Islands	BJP	Bishnu Pada Ray	INC	Kuldeep Rai Sharma	CPI(M)	D. Ayyappan

== Surveys and polls ==
=== Opinion polls ===
Polling agency	Date published	Margin of error				Lead
Polling agency	Date published	Margin of error	NDA	INDIA	Others	Lead
India TV-CNX	April 2024	±3%	1	0	0	NDA
ABP News-CVoter	March 2024	±5%	1	0	0	NDA

=== Exit polls ===
Polling agency				Lead
Polling agency	NDA	INDIA	Others	Lead
Actual results	1	0	0	NDA

== Results ==
=== Results by party and alliance ===
Alliance/ Party		Popular vote			Seats		
Alliance/ Party		Votes	%	±pp	Contested	Won	+/−
NDA	BJP	1,02,182	52.17%	▲6.79%	1	1	▲1
INDIA	INC	77,829	38.53%	▼7.44%	1	0	▼1
Others		16,255	8.03%		5		
IND		3,974	1.96%		5		
NOTA		1089	0.89%				
Total		202,514	100%	-	12	1	-

=== Results by constituency ===
Constituency		Turnout	Winner					Runner-up					Margin
Constituency		Turnout	Party	Alliance	Candidate	Votes	%	Party	Alliance	Candidate	Votes	%	Margin
1	Andaman and Nicobar Islands	64.10%	BJP	NDA	Bishnu Pada Ray	1,02,182	52.17%	INC	INDIA	Kuldeep Rai Sharma	77,829	38.53%	24,396
