= 2009 Indian general election in the Andaman and Nicobar Islands =

- 16 April 2009

1 seat

| | First party | Second party |
|---|---|---|
| Leader | Bishnu Pada Ray | Kuldeep Rai Sharma |
| Party | NDA | UPA |
| Seats won | 1 | 0 |
| Seat change | ▲1 | ▼1 |
- Andaman and Nicobar Islands

The 2009 Indian general election in Andaman and Nicobar Islands, occurred for 1 seat in the state. BJP candidate Bishnu Pada Ray won the election from the only seat. Ray defeated Congress candidate Kuldeep Rai Sharma.

== Background ==
=== Andaman and Nicobar Island electoral history ===
Until the 1967 general election, the Member of Parliament representing this territory was directly appointed by the President of India, not elected by a voting populus. Since 1967, the Andaman and Nicobar Islands have primarily voted for the Indian National Congress (INC) candidate – an unbroken streak from 1967 to 1998, and again in 2004. There was only one previous general election where the highest share of votes in this state went to a BJP candidate: the 1999 Indian general election, where Bishnu Pada Ray was again the candidate.

The subsequent general election (2014 Indian general election), then-incumbent Bishnu Pada Ray held onto his seat and was re-elected to the 16th Lok Sabha. He did not run again in the 2019 Indian general election, where the BJP candidate, Vishal Jolly, lost. Bishnu Pada Ray ran again in the 2024 Indian general election and won the majority of the votes as a member of the BJP, aligned with the National Democratic Alliance.

=== 2009 Indian general election ===
Constituency boundaries were redrawn between 2004 and 2009 based on the 2001 census. Votes were counted on 16 May 2009 and the results were declared the same day.

At the time of the election, there were 265,108 registered voters in the Andaman and Nicobar Islands, and 170,107 votes were cast. This was a turnout rate of 64.2%.

== Results by Party ==
| Party Name | | Popular vote | | | Seats | | |
| Party Name | | Votes | % | ±pp | Contested | Won | +/− |
|---|---|---|---|---|---|---|---|
| | BJP | 75,211 | 44.21 | ▲8.26 | 1 | 1 | ▲1 |
| | INC | 72,221 | 42.46 | ▼13.31 | 1 | 0 | ▼1 |
| | CPI(M) | 7,190 | 4.23 | ▲1.52 | 1 | 0 | Steady |
| | RJD | 4,916 | 2.89 | Steady | 1 | 0 | Steady |
| | NCP | 4,696 | 2.76 | ▲1.22 | 1 | 0 | Steady |
| | JDP | 1,785 | 1.05 | Steady | 1 | 0 | Steady |
| | BSP | 789 | 0.46 | ▼0.27 | 1 | 0 | |
| CPI(M-L)L | 734 | 0.43 | ▼0.51 | 1 | 0 | Steady | |
| | IND | 2,561 | 1.51 | ▼0.21 | 3 | 0 | Steady |
| Total | | 1,70,103 | 100% | - | 11 | 1 | - |

== Detailed Results ==
| Constituency | | Winner | | | | Runner-up | | | | Margin | |
| Constituency | | Candidate | Party | Votes | % | Candidate | Party | Votes | % | Votes | % |
|---|---|---|---|---|---|---|---|---|---|---|---|
| 1 | Andaman & Nicobar Islands | Bishnu Pada Ray | BJP | 75,211 | 44.21 | Kuldeep Rai Sharma | INC | 72,221 | 42.46 | 2,990 | 1.75 |
