= 2019 Indian general election in the Andaman and Nicobar Islands =

Election to an Indian federal unit

- 11 April 2019

1 seat
- Turnout: 65.12%

	First party	Second party
Leader	Kuldeep Rai Sharma	Vishal Jolly
Party	INC	BJP
Alliance	UPA	NDA
Last election	0	1
Seats won	1	0
Seat change	▲1	▼1
Popular vote	95,308	93,901
Percentage	45.98%	45.30%
Swing	▲2.29	▼2.50
- Andaman and Nicobar Islands Lok Sabha Constituency
Prime Minister before election
Narendra Modi
BJP
Prime Minister after election
Narendra Modi
BJP

The 2019 Indian general election in Andaman and Nicobar Islands, held for the one seat in the Islands. Congress candidate Kuldeep Rai Sharma won the election from the only seat. Sharma defeated BJP candidate Vishal Jolly.

== Parties and alliances ==
=== National Democratic Alliance ===
Party	Flag	Symbol	Leader	Seats contested
Bharatiya Janata Party			Vishal Jolly	1

=== United Progressive Alliance ===
Party	Flag	Symbol	Leader	Seats contested
Indian National Congress			Kuldeep Rai Sharma	1

== Detailed Results ==
=== Results by Party ===
Party Name	Popular vote			Seats		
Party Name	Votes	%	±pp	Contested	Won	+/−
INC	95,308	45.95	▲2.26	1	1	▲1
BJP	93,901	45.28	▼2.52	1	0	▼1
AAP	2,839	1.37	▼0.59	1	0	Steady
BSP	2,486	1.20	Steady	1	0	Steady
AITC	1,721	0.83	▼0.37	1	0	Steady
IND	9,417	4.54	Steady	9	0	Steady
Others	212	0.10	Steady	1	0	Steady
NOTA	1,412	0.68	Steady			
Total	2,07,296	100%	-	15	1	-
