= K. R. Ganesh =

Indian politician

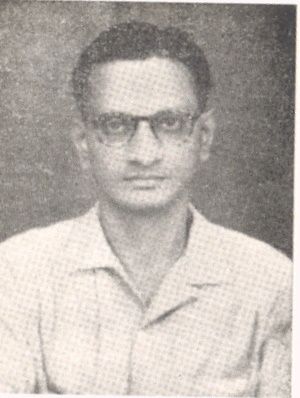

Member of Parliament, Lok Sabha
- In office 1967–1977
- Preceded by: Niranjan Lall
- Succeeded by: Manoranjan Bhakta
- Constituency: Andaman and Nicobar Islands

Personal details
- Born: 21 June 1922 Port Blair, Andaman and Nicobar Islands
- Died: 2 January 2004 (aged 81) Gurgaon, Haryana
- Party: Janata Party
- Other political affiliations: Indian National Congress
- Spouse: Kanta Maurya
- Parent: Bipti Ram Maurya (father)

K. R. Ganesh (June 21, 1922 - 2004) was an Indian politician and a member of the 4th Lok Sabha and 5th Lok Sabha. He was elected to the Lok Sabha, lower house of the Parliament of India from Andaman and Nicobar Islands in the 1967 Indian general election and 1971 Indian general elections a member of the Indian National Congress. He was Minister of State in the Ministry of Finance from June 26, 1970 to October 10, 1974 and then Ministry of Petroleum and Chemicals from October 10, 1974 to December 1, 1975. He was co-founders of Congress for Democracy along with Jagjivan Ram, Hemvati Nandan Bahuguna, and Nandini Satpathy left the Indian National Congress of Indira Gandhi and denounced her rule during the Indian Emergency.
