= Lachman Singh =

Member of Lok Sabha
- In office 1957–1962
- Preceded by: John Richardson
- Succeeded by: Niranjan Lall
- Constituency: Nominated from Andaman and Nicobar Islands

Personal details
- Born: Lachman Singh; 31 October 1906 Junglighat, Port Blair
- Party: Indian National Congress
- Spouse: Shrimati Bidyavati
- Children: Four sons
- Education: Government High School, Port Blair
- Occupation: General Merchant

Lachman Singh was a leader of the Indian National Congress from Andaman and Nicobar Islands. He was nominated as Member of Parliament to 2nd Lok Sabha representing Andaman and Nicobar Islands the lower house of India's Parliament as a member of the Indian National Congress.
