= 2009 Indian general election in Rajasthan =

Indian general election in Rajasthan, 2009
- April–May 2009

25 seats
- Turnout: 48.41%
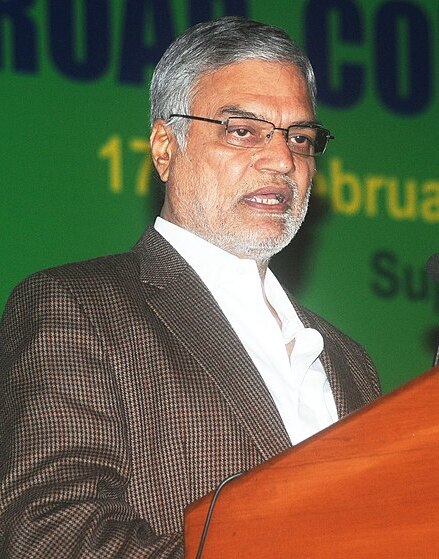

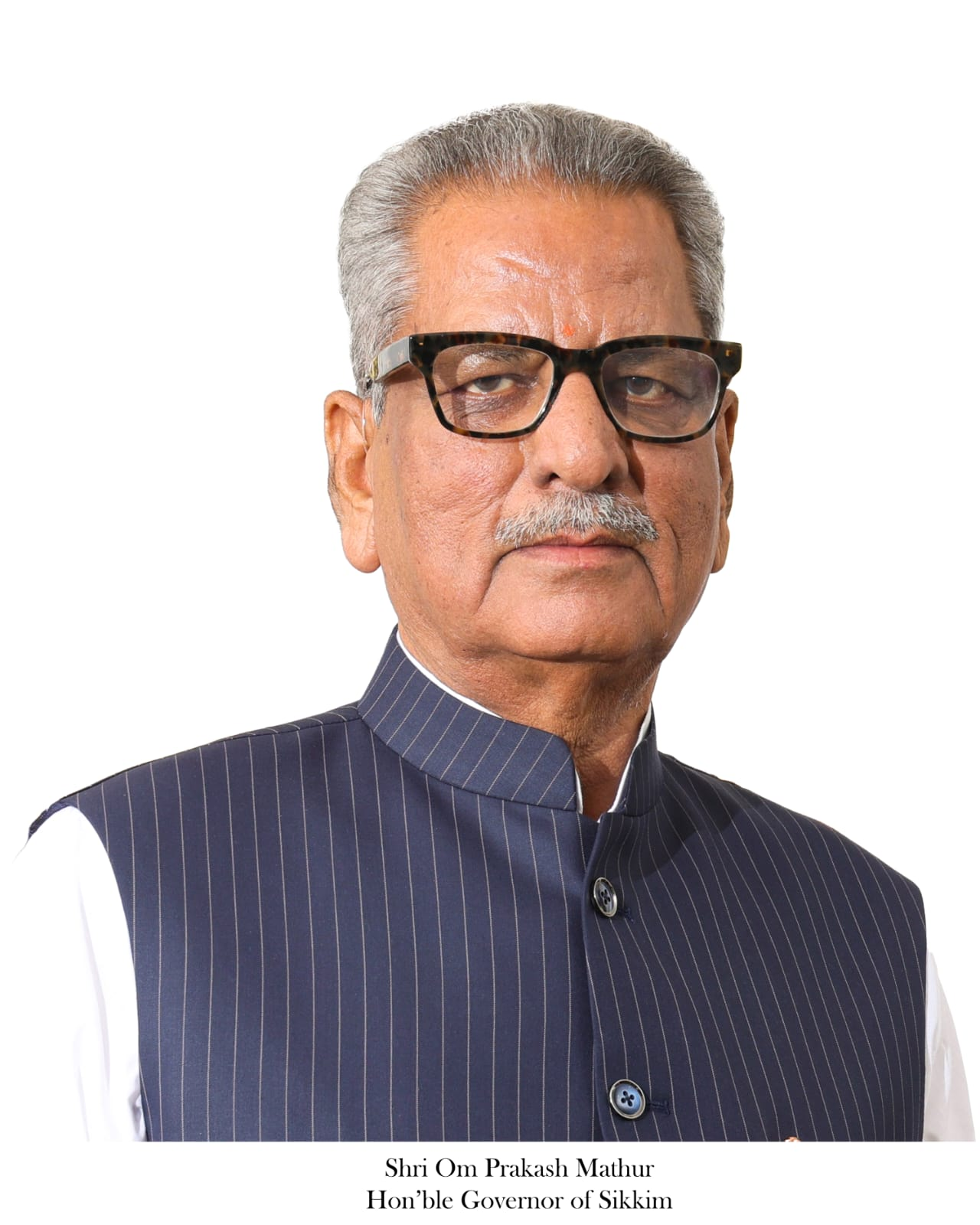
	First party	Second party
Leader	C. P. Joshi	Om Prakash Mathur
Party	INC	BJP
Alliance	UPA	NDA
Leader's seat	Bhilwara
Last election	4 seats, 41.42%	21 seats, 49.01%
Seats won	20	4
Seat change	▲16	▼17
Percentage	47.19%	36.57%
Swing	▲5.77%	▼12.44%
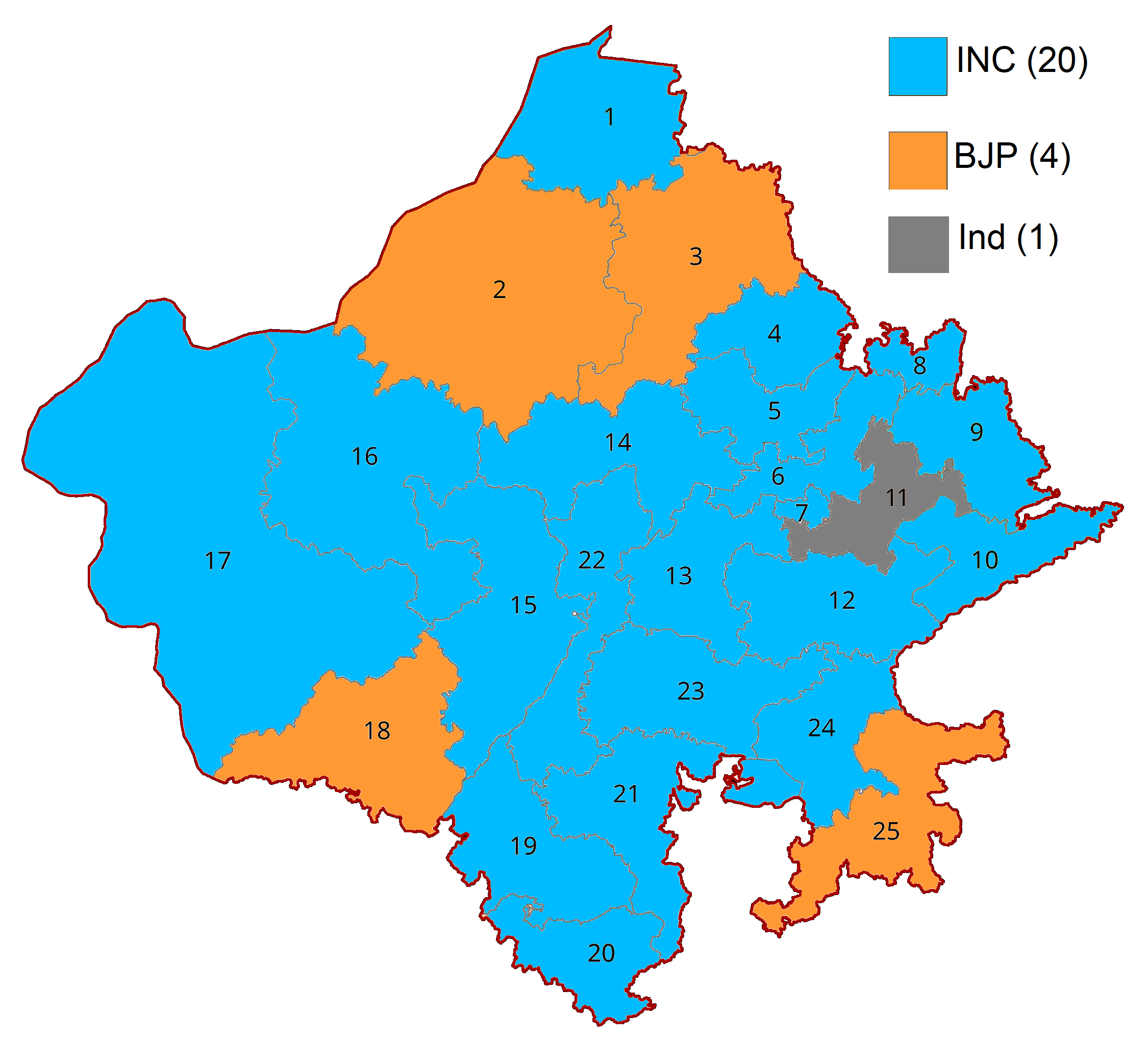
Prime Minister before election
Manmohan Singh
INC
Prime Minister after election
Manmohan Singh
INC

The 2009 Indian general election in Rajasthan, occurred for 25 seats in the state.

== Parties and alliances ==
=== National Democratic Alliance ===
Party	Flag	Symbol	Leader	Seats contested
Bharatiya Janata Party			Om Prakash Mathur	25

=== United Progressive Alliance ===
Party	Flag	Symbol	Leader	Seats contested
Indian National Congress			C. P. Joshi	25

== Result ==
=== Results by Party ===
Indian National Congress won 20 seats, Bharatiya Janata Party won 4 seats and remaining 1 seat was won by an independent.

Party Name	Popular vote			Seats		
Party Name	Votes	%	±pp	Contested	Won	+/−
INC	84,61,227	47.19	▲5.77	25	20	▲16
BJP	65,57,727	36.57	▼12.44	25	4	▼17
BSP	6,04,355	3.37	▲0.21	24	0	Steady
CPI(M)	2,25,068	1.26	▲0.75	3	0	Steady
Others	4,13,430	2.31	Steady	83	0	Steady
IND	16,69,786	9.31	▲6.59	188	1	▲1
Total	1,79,31,593	100%	-	346	25	-

=== Elected MPs ===
Constituency		Winner				Runner Up				Margin	%
#	Name	Candidate	Party	Votes	%	Candidate	Party	Votes	%	Margin	%
1	Ganganagar	Bharat Ram Meghwal	INC	476,554	52.39	Nihal Chand	BJP	335,886	36.93	140,668	15.46
2	Bikaner	Arjun Ram Meghwal	BJP	244,537	42.92	Rewat Ram Panwar	INC	224,962	39.48	19,575	3.44
3	Churu	Ram Singh Kaswan	BJP	376,708	46.94	Rafique Mandelia	INC	364,268	45.39	12,440	1.55
4	Jhunjhunu	Sheesh Ram Ola	INC	306,330	50.89	Dasrath Shekhawat	BJP	240,998	40.04	65,332	10.85
5	Sikar	Mahadev Singh	INC	324,812	44.79	Subhash Maharia	BJP	175,386	24.18	149,426	20.61
6	Jaipur Rural	Lal Chand Kataria	INC	278,266	40.53	Rao Rajendra Singh	BJP	226,029	32.92	52,237	7.61
7	Jaipur	Mahesh Joshi	INC	397,438	48.89	Ghanshyam Tiwari	BJP	381,339	46.91	16,099	1.98
8	Alwar	Jitendra Singh	INC	450,119	59.02	Dr. Kiran Yadav	BJP	293,500	38.48	156,619	20.54
9	Bharatpur	Ratan Singh	INC	301,434	53.76	Khemchand	BJP	219,980	39.23	81,454	14.53
10	Karauli-Dholpur	Khiladi Lal Bairwa	INC	215,810	44.30	Dr. Manoj Rajoria	BJP	186,087	38.20	29,723	6.10
11	Dausa	Kirodi Lal	IND	433,666	51.54	Qummer Rubbani	IND	295,907	35.17	137,759	16.37
12	Tonk-Sawai Madhopur	Namo Narain	INC	375,572	46.82	Kirori Singh Bainsla	BJP	375,255	46.78	317	0.04
13	Ajmer	Sachin Pilot	INC	405,575	52.59	Kiran Maheshwari	BJP	329,440	42.72	76,135	9.87
14	Nagaur	Dr. Jyoti Mirdha	INC	333,261	54.64	Bindu Chaudhary	BJP	178,124	29.21	155,137	25.43
15	Pali	Badri Ram Jakhar	INC	387,604	53.62	Pusp Jain	BJP	190,887	26.41	196,717	27.21
16	Jodhpur	Chandresh Kumari	INC	361,577	53.06	Jaswant Singh Bisnoi	BJP	263,248	38.63	98,329	14.43
17	Barmer	Harish Choudhary	INC	416,497	53.04	Manvendra Singh	BJP	297,391	37.87	119,106	15.17
18	Jalore	Devji Patel	BJP	194,503	33.67	Buta Singh	IND	144,698	25.05	49,805	8.62
19	Udaipur	Raghuvir Singh Meena	INC	411,510	54.27	Mahaveer Bhagora	BJP	246,585	32.52	164,925	21.75
20	Banswara	Tarachand Bhagora	INC	413,169	53.75	Hakaru Maida	BJP	213,751	27.80	199,418	25.95
21	Chittorgarh	(Dr.) Girija Vyas	INC	399,663	50.28	Shrichand Kriplani	BJP	326,885	41.13	72,778	9.15
22	Rajsamand	Gopal Singh	INC	294,451	49.82	Rasa Singh Rawat	BJP	248,561	42.06	45,890	7.76
23	Bhilwara	Dr. C. P. Joshi	INC	413,128	54.76	Vijayendra Pal Singh	BJP	277,760	36.82	135,368	17.94
24	Kota	IjyaraJ Singh	INC	360,486	52.87	Shyam Sharma	BJP	277,393	40.69	83,093	12.18
25	Jhalawar-Baran	Dushyant Singh	BJP	429,096	49.22	Urmila Jain "Bhaya"	INC	376,255	43.16	52,841	6.06

== Post-election Union Council of Ministers from Rajasthan ==
#	Name	Constituency	Designation	Department	From	To	Party
1	C. P. Joshi	Bhilwara	Cabinet Minister	Rural Development	28 May 2009	19 Jan 2011	INC
1	C. P. Joshi	Bhilwara	Cabinet Minister	Panchayati Raj	28 May 2009	19 Jan 2011	INC
1	C. P. Joshi	Bhilwara	Cabinet Minister	Road Transport and Highways	19 Jan 2011	16 June 2013	INC
1	C. P. Joshi	Bhilwara	Cabinet Minister	Railways (Addl. Charge)	22 Sept 2012	28 Oct 2012	INC
1	C. P. Joshi	Bhilwara	Cabinet Minister	Railways (Addl. Charge)	11 May 2013	16 June 2013	INC
2	Anand Sharma	Rajasthan (Rajya Sabha)	Cabinet Minister	Commerce and Industry	28 May 2009	26 May 2014	INC
2	Anand Sharma	Rajasthan (Rajya Sabha)	Cabinet Minister	Textiles	12 July 2011	17 June 2013	INC
2	Anand Sharma	Rajasthan (Rajya Sabha)	Cabinet Minister	Textiles	3 Apr 2014	26 May 2014	INC
3	Sachin Pilot	Ajmer	MoS	Communications and Information Technology	28 May 2009	28 Oct 2012	INC
3	Sachin Pilot	Ajmer	MoS(I/C)	Corporate Affairs	28 Oct 2012	26 May 2014	INC
4	Namo Narain Meena	Tonk-Sawai Madhopur	MoS	Finance	28 May 2009	26 May 2014	INC
5	Mahadeo Singh Khandela	Sikar	MoS	Road Transport and Highways	28 May 2009	19 Jan 2011	INC
5	Mahadeo Singh Khandela	Sikar	MoS	Tribal Affairs	19 Jan 2011	27 Oct 2012	INC
6	Jitendra Singh	Alwar	MoS	Home Affairs	12 July 2011	28 Oct 2012	INC
6	Jitendra Singh	Alwar	MoS(I/C)	Youth Affairs and Sports	28 Oct 2012	26 May 2014	INC
6	Jitendra Singh	Alwar	MoS	Defence	29 Oct 2012	26 May 2014	INC
7	Chandresh Kumari Katoch	Jodhpur	Cabinet Minister	Culture	28 Oct 2012	26 May 2014	INC
8	Girija Vyas	Chittorgarh	Cabinet Minister	Housing and Urban Poverty Alleviation	16 June 2013	26 May 2014	INC
9	Lal Chand Kataria	Jaipur Rural	MoS	Defence	28 Oct 2012	31 Oct 2012	INC
9	Lal Chand Kataria	Jaipur Rural	MoS	Rural Development	31 Oct 2012	26 May 2014	INC
10	Sis Ram Ola	Jhunjhunu	Cabinet Minister	Labour and Employment	17 June 2013	15 Dec 2013	INC

== Assembly Segment wise lead ==
Party	Assembly segments	Position in Assembly (as of 2013 election)
Indian National Congress	144	21
Bharatiya Janata Party	42	163
Communist Party of India (Marxist)	1	0
Others	13	16
Total	200	
