= Niranjan Lall =

Indian politician (1901–?)

Member of Lok Sabha
- In office 1962–1967
- Preceded by: Lachman Singh
- Succeeded by: K. R. Ganesh
- Constituency: Nominated from Andaman and Nicobar Islands

Personal details
- Born: Niranjan Lall; 29 August 1901 Port Blair
- Party: Indian National Congress
- Spouse: Basant Kunwar
- Education: Forest College, Dehradun

Niranjan Lall (29 August 1901 – ?) was a leader of the Indian National Congress from Andaman and Nicobar Islands. He was nominated as Member of Parliament to 3rd Lok Sabha representing Andaman and Nicobar Islands the lower house of India's Parliament as a member of the Indian National Congress. He was also member and Vice-Chairman of the Port Blair Municipal Board.
