= Samruddha Odisha =

Samurdha Odisha is a political party in Odisha, India. The party was formed by Jatish Chandra Mohanty, ahead of the 2009 elections. Mohanty serves as the president of the party. The party fielded seven candidates in the Lok Sabha elections.
