= 2009 Indian general election in Himachal Pradesh =

- 13 May 2009

4 seats
- Turnout: 58.43%

	First party	Second party
Party	BJP	INC
Last election	1	3
Seats won	3	1
Seat change	▲2	▼2
Percentage	49.58%	45.61%
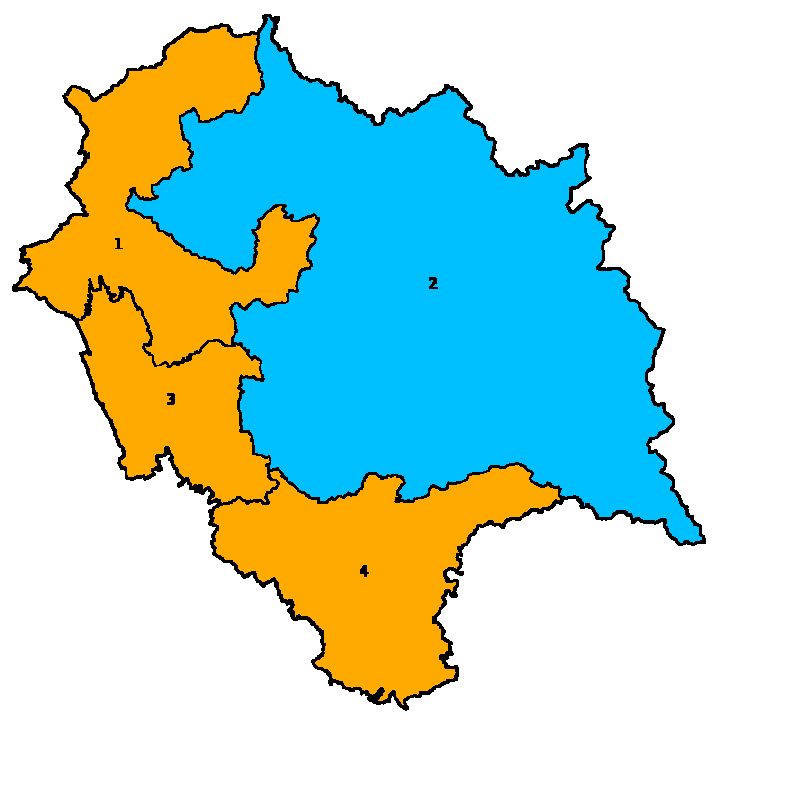
- Himachal Pradesh
Prime Minister before election
Manmohan Singh
INC
Prime Minister after election
Manmohan Singh
INC

The 2009 Indian general election in Himachal Pradesh were held for four seats, namely Kangra, Mandi, and Hamirpur (unreserved or general) and Shimla (reserved for Scheduled Castes). Bharatiya Janata Party won three seats while Indian National Congress won one seat.

== Nominations ==
A total of 45 candidates (43 men and 2 women) filed nominations with the Election Commission of India (ECI). Among these, nominations of eight men and one women were rejected by the ECI. Five men withdrew their nominations. This resulted in 31 candidates (30 men and 1 woman) contesting elections.

== Parties and alliances ==
=== National Democratic Alliance ===
Party	Flag	Symbol	Leader	Seats contested
Bharatiya Janata Party			Prem Kumar Dhumal	4

=== United Progressive Alliance ===
Party	Flag	Symbol	Leader	Seats contested
Indian National Congress			Virbhadra Singh	4

== Results ==
Out of total 31 candidates contesting, deposits of 23 candidates (22 men and 1 woman) were forfeited for failing to secure more than one-sixth (16.7%) of the total valid votes cast.

Bharatiya Janata Party won three seats while one seat went to the Indian National Congress.

=== Party-wise results ===
Party Name	Popular vote			Seats		
Party Name	Votes	%	±pp	Contested	Won	+/−
BJP	13,33,774	49.58	▲5.34	4	3	▲2
INC	12,26,933	45.61	▼6.28	4	1	▼2
Others	89,592	3.33	Steady	14	0	Steady
IND	39,991	1.49	▼0.17	9	0	Steady
Total	26,90,290	100%	-	31	4	-

=== Elected MPs ===
Constituency		Winner				Runner Up				Margin	%
#	Name	Candidate	Party	Votes	%	Candidate	Party	Votes	%	Margin	%
1	Kangra	Dr. Rajan Sushant	BJP	322,254	48.69	Chander Kumar	INC	301,475	45.55	20,779	3.14
2	Mandi	Virbhadra Singh	INC	340,973	47.82	Maheshwar Singh	BJP	326,976	45.86	13,997	1.96
3	Hamirpur	Anurag Singh Thakur	BJP	373,598	53.47	Narinder Thakur	INC	300,866	43.06	72,732	10.41
4	Shimla (SC)	Virender Kashyap	BJP	310,946	50.42	Dhani Ram Shandil	INC	283,619	45.99	27,327	4.43

== Post-election Union Council of Ministers from Himachal Pradesh ==
#	Name	Constituency	Designation	Department	From	To	Party
1	Virbhadra Singh	Mandi	Cabinet Minister	Steel	28 May 2009	19 January 2011	INC
1	Virbhadra Singh	Mandi	Cabinet Minister	Micro, Small and Medium Enterprises	19 January 2011	26 June 2012	INC

== Assembly segment-wise lead ==
Party	Assembly segments	Position in Assembly (as of 2012 election)
Bharatiya Janata Party	48	26
Indian National Congress	20	36
Others	0	6
Total	68	

== See also ==
- Results of the 2009 Indian general election by state
