= Kuldeep Rai Sharma =

Indian politician (born 1967)

Member of Parliament, Lok Sabha
- In office 23 May 2019 – 4 June 2024
- Preceded by: Bishnu Pada Ray
- Succeeded by: Bishnu Pada Ray
- Constituency: Andaman & Nicobar Islands

President of the Andaman and Nicobar Territorial Congress Committee
- In office 28 June 2020 – 6 August 2021
- National President Indian National Congress: Sonia Gandhi
- Succeeded by: Rangalal Haldar

Personal details
- Born: 10 September 1967 (age 59) Port Blair, Andaman and Nicobar Islands, India
- Party: Indian National Congress
- Spouse: Vinita Sharma
- Children: 2 Daughter (Aastha Sharma and Namya Sharma)

Kuldeep Rai Sharma (born 10 September 1967) is an Indian politician belonging to INC, who served as a member of Parliament from 2019 to 2024. He also served as President of Andaman and Nicobar Territorial Congress Committee until 2021. Later on, he was promoted by Congress President Sonia Gandhi as All India Congress Committee (AICC) secretary incharge for Indian National Congress in Karnataka.

Kuldeep Rai Sharma won the Lok Sabha election 2019 as an Indian National Congress candidate and became Member of Parliament of Andaman & Nicobar Islands constituency, defeating the BJP candidate by a nominal margin of 1,407 votes in his fourth attempt to reach the Parliament. However, in 2024 he again lost to BJP candidate Bishnu Pada Ray by a margin of 23,996 votes.

== Results of Past Elections ==
Year	Office	Constituency	Party	Votes for	%	Opponent	Party	Votes	%	Result
1998	Member of Parliament, Lok Sabha	Andaman and Nicober Islands	Indian Congress (Socialist)	29,687	20.36	Manoranjan Bhakta	Indian National Congress	52,365	35.91	Lost
2009	Member of Parliament, Lok Sabha	Andaman and Nicober Islands	Indian National Congress	72,221	42.46	Bishnu Pada Ray	Bharatiya Janata Party	75,211	44.21	Lost
2014	Member of Parliament, Lok Sabha	Andaman and Nicober Islands	Indian National Congress	83,157	43.69	Bishnu Pada Ray	Bharatiya Janata Party	90,969	47.80	Lost
2019	Member of Parliament, Lok Sabha	Andaman and Nicober Islands	Indian National Congress	95,308	45.98	Vishal Jolly	Bharatiya Janata Party	93,901	45.30	Won
2024	Member of Parliament, Lok Sabha	Andaman and Nicober Islands	Indian National Congress	78,040	38.54	Bishnu Pada Ray	Bharatiya Janata Party	102,436	50.58	Lost

== Awards and recognition ==
UNICEF awarded him with PGC Awards 2020 for his work to protect child rights. He initiated 18 debates and 15 questions on matters relating to child labour, malnutrition, mid-day meal schemes, safety of children and child immunisation in the parliament during 2019–20.

== Legal issues ==
In July 2025, Kuldeep Rai Sharma became the subject of a criminal investigation relating to alleged irregularities at the Andaman & Nicobar State Cooperative Bank, where he had earlier served as chairman. A First Information Report was filed on 15 May 2025 concerning alleged misuse of banking procedures in loan sanctions. On 18 July 2025, the Andaman & Nicobar Police CID arrested him from a hospital in Port Blair while he was undergoing treatment. His bail petition was rejected by the Chief Judicial Magistrate’s court in Port Blair, leading to police custody followed by 14 days of judicial custody.

On 31 July 2025, the Enforcement Directorate (ED) conducted its first-ever searches in the Andaman and Nicobar Islands, targeting locations in Port Blair and Kolkata, as part of a money laundering investigation linked to the case. The ED alleged that more than 100 bank accounts were used to siphon over ₹500 crore, and seized property documents valued at over ₹100 crore. As of early August 2025, Sharma and at least seven others had been arrested in connection with the alleged scam. Among those formally arrested were K. Murugan, then Managing Director of ANSCBL, and Kalaivanan, a bank employee. The FIR additionally named the former chairman Bhagat Singh, several board members/directors, and multiple beneficiaries as accused parties.

The Andaman & Nicobar State Cooperative Bank’s official disclosures list multiple non-performing asset (NPA) accounts sanctioned during Ravinder Rao’s tenure as Managing Director. As of August 2025, no independent media reports or official statements have indicated that Rao has been named in connection with the ongoing criminal investigation into the bank’s lending practices.
