= Bishnu Pada Ray =

Indian politician (born 1950)

Bisnu Pada Ray
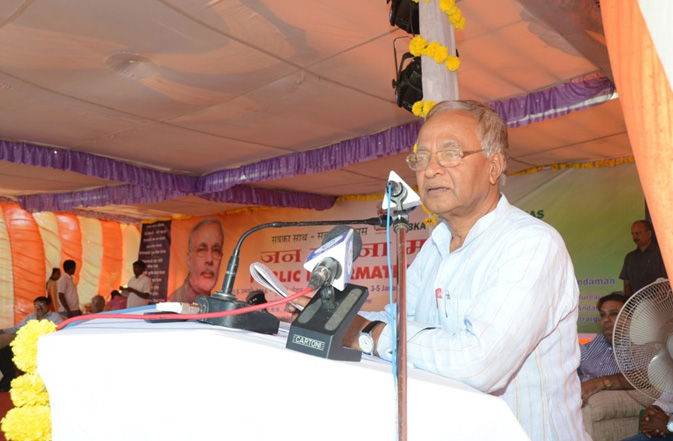
- Ray in 2016

Member of Parliament, Lok Sabha
- Incumbent
- Assumed office 4 June 2024
- Preceded by: Kuldeep Rai Sharma
- Constituency: Andaman & Nicobar Islands
- In office 16 May 2009 – 23 May 2019
- Preceded by: Manoranjan Bhakta
- Succeeded by: Kuldeep Rai Sharma
- Constituency: Andaman & Nicobar Islands
- In office 6 October 1999 – 16 May 2004
- Preceded by: Manoranjan Bhakta
- Succeeded by: Manoranjan Bhakta
- Constituency: Andaman & Nicobar Islands

Personal details
- Born: 19 June 1950 (age 76) Ashoknagar Kalyangarh, West Bengal, India
- Party: Bharatiya Janata Party
- Education: Anandamohan College, Kolkata
- Occupation: Politician
- As of 3 May, 2019 Source: National Portal of India

Bishnu Pada Ray (born 19 June 1950) is an Indian politician and a leader of the Bharatiya Janata Party. He is elected to the elected to 18th Lok Sabha from Andaman and Nicobar Islands constituency since 2024. Previously, he was elected to 13th Lok Sabha from Andaman and Nicobar Islands constituency from 1999 to 2004 and again from 2009 to 2019.

== Early life and education ==
Ray was born to Ramashis Ray on 19 June 1950 at Ashoknagar Kalyangarh, West Bengal, India.

He has completed Bachelor of Commerce from University of Calcutta in year 1973.

== Electoral history ==
Year	Office	Constituency	Party		Votes for	%	Opponent	Party		Votes	%	Result
1991	Member of Parliament, Lok Sabha	Andaman and Nicober Islands	Bharatiya Janata Party	5,208	4.85	Manoranjan Bhakta	Indian National Congress	54,075	50.39	Lost		
1996	Member of Parliament, Lok Sabha	Andaman and Nicober Islands	Bharatiya Janata Party	31,097	24.25	Manoranjan Bhakta	Indian National Congress	74,642	58.22	Lost		
1998	Member of Parliament, Lok Sabha	Andaman and Nicober Islands	Bharatiya Janata Party	51,821	35.53	Manoranjan Bhakta	Indian National Congress	52,365	35.91	Lost		
1999	Member of Parliament, Lok Sabha	Andaman and Nicober Islands	Bharatiya Janata Party	76,891	52.74	Manoranjan Bhakta	Indian National Congress	62,944	43.17	Won		
2004	Member of Parliament, Lok Sabha	Andaman and Nicober Islands	Bharatiya Janata Party	55,294	35.95	Manoranjan Bhakta	Indian National Congress	85,794	55.77	Lost		
2009	Member of Parliament, Lok Sabha	Andaman and Nicober Islands	Bharatiya Janata Party	75,211	44.21	Kuldeep Rai Sharma	Indian National Congress	72,221	42.46	Won		
2014	Member of Parliament, Lok Sabha	Andaman and Nicober Islands	Bharatiya Janata Party	90,969	47.80	Kuldeep Rai Sharma	Indian National Congress	83,157	43.69	Won		
2024	Member of Parliament, Lok Sabha	Andaman and Nicober Islands	Bharatiya Janata Party	102,182	50.59	Kuldeep Rai Sharma	Indian National Congress	77,829	38.53	Won		
