= Manoranjan Bhakta =

Indian politician (1939–2015)

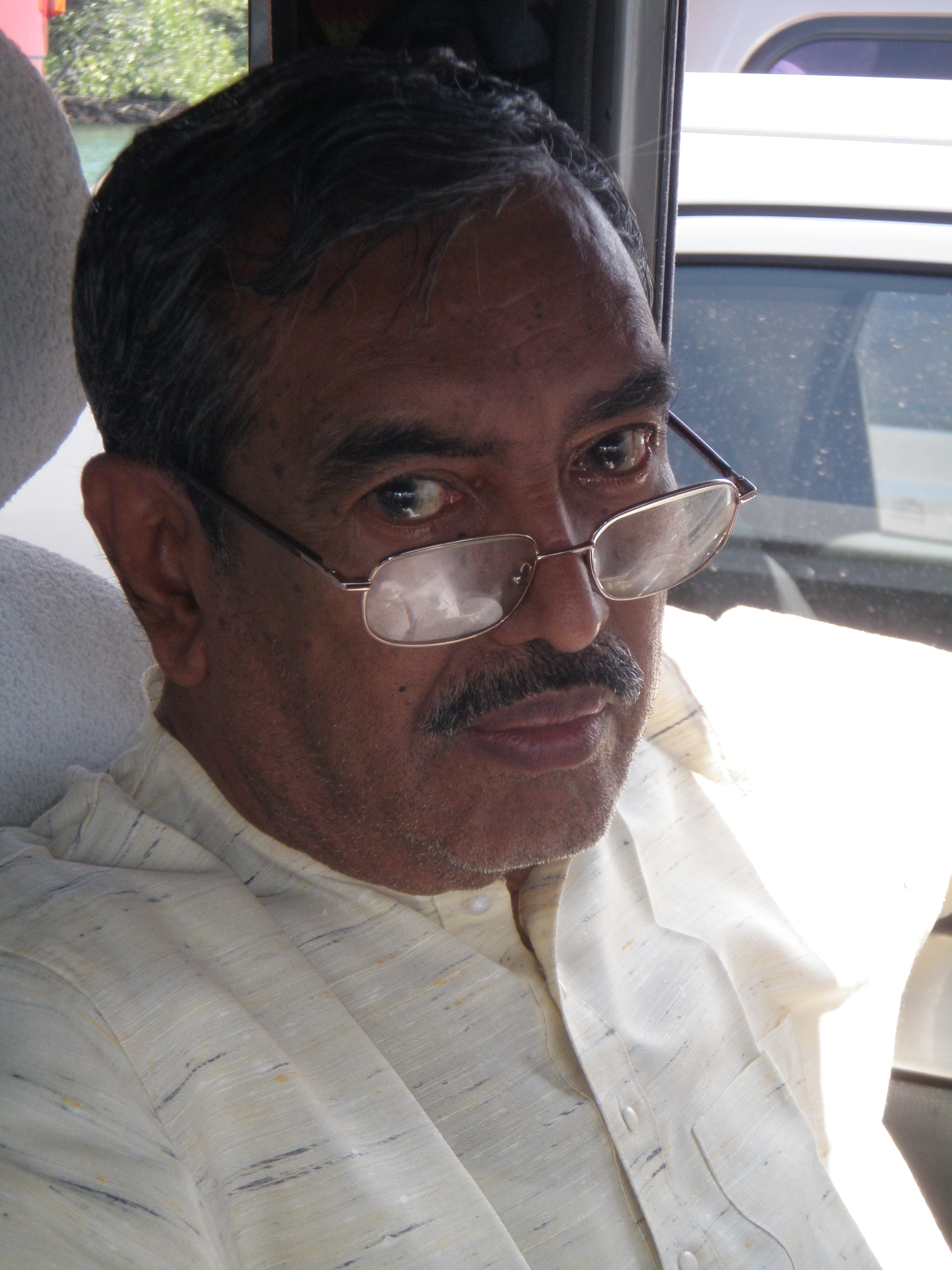
- Manoranjan Bhakta

Member of Parliament, Lok Sabha
- In office 22 March 1977 — 26 April 1999
- Preceded by: K. R. Ganesh
- Succeeded by: Bishnu Pada Ray
- Constituency: Andaman and Nicobar Islands
- In office 16 May 2004 — 16 May 2009
- Preceded by: Bishnu Pada Ray
- Succeeded by: Bishnu Pada Ray
- Constituency: Andaman and Nicobar Islands

Personal details
- Born: 10 April 1939 Charmanshi, Barisal District, Bengal Presidency, British India
- Died: 12 June 2015 (aged 76) Salt Lake, Kolkata
- Party: Indian National Congress
- Spouse: Shanti Bhakta
- Children: 2
- As of 16 June, 2015

Manoranjan Bhakta (10 April 1939 – 12 June 2015) was an Indian politician and a leader of the Indian National Congress (INC) political party. He was first elected as member of parliament for the Andaman and Nicobar Islands in 1977 to the 6th Lok Sabha. In total, he served eight terms as member of parliament for this constituency, seven of which were consecutive from 1977 to 1999. In 2010, after being denied a ticket in an election, he left the INC and later joined the Trinamool Congress.

He studied M.A. and LL.B. from Calcutta University, Calcutta. He was an Agriculturist, Political and Social Worker by profession. He started his political career as a Pradhan of Diglipur Gram Panchayat serving from 1961 to 1971.

Andaman and Nicobar Islands lawyer and journalist Anita Mondal, who is his daughter contested the Andaman and Nicobar Islands seat as Trinamool Congress candidate in the 2014 general election where she finished in fourth place garnering 2,283 votes. She is also a Trinamool Congress councillor in Bidhannagar Municipality.
