= Andaman and Nicobar Islands Lok Sabha constituency =

Lok Sabha Constituency in Andaman and Nicobar Islands

Coordinates: 10°N 93°E

Andaman and Nicobar Islands AN-1
- Lok Sabha constituency
- Location of Andaman & Nicobar Islands in India

Constituency details
- Country: India
- Union Territory: Andaman and Nicobar Islands
- District: Nicobar, North and Middle Andaman, South Andaman
- Established: 1952
- Reservation: None

Member of Parliament
- 18th Lok Sabha
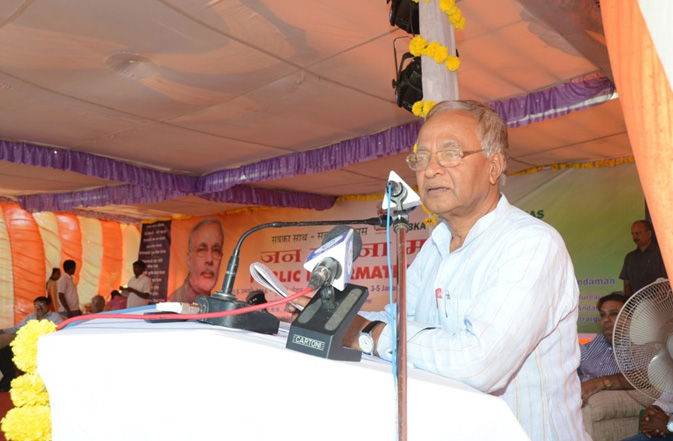
- Incumbent Bishnu Pada Ray
- Party: BJP
- Alliance: NDA
- Elected year: 2024

Andaman and Nicobar Islands Lok Sabha constituency is the only Lok Sabha (Parliamentary) constituency in the Union Territory of Andaman and Nicobar Islands. It covers the entire union territory. Andaman and Nicobar Island has been voting for its Member of Parliament since 1967 Indian general election.

Until the 1967 general election, the Member of Parliament representing this territory was not elected, but directly appointed by the President of India. After 1967, the member of parliament was elected by adult franchise. The first elected member of parliament was K. R. Ganesh. He is the only elected member from this constituency to serve as a minister at the central government. Manoranjan Bhakta has won 8 times from this constituency. As of the latest election in 2024, the current MP representing this constituency is Bishnu Pada Ray of the Bhartiya Janata Party.

== Members of Parliament ==
| Year | Name of MP | Political Affiliation |
|---|---|---|
| 1952 | John Richardson | Nominated |
| 1957 | Lachman Singh | Nominated |
| 1962 | Niranjan Lall | Nominated |
| 1967 | K. R. Ganesh | Indian National Congress |
| 1971 | K. R. Ganesh | Indian National Congress |
| 1977 | Manoranjan Bhakta | Indian National Congress |
| 1980 | Manoranjan Bhakta | Indian National Congress |
| 1984 | Manoranjan Bhakta | Indian National Congress |
| 1989 | Manoranjan Bhakta | Indian National Congress |
| 1991 | Manoranjan Bhakta | Indian National Congress |
| 1996 | Manoranjan Bhakta | Indian National Congress |
| 1998 | Manoranjan Bhakta | Indian National Congress |
| 1999 | Bishnu Pada Ray | Bharatiya Janata Party |
| 2004 | Manoranjan Bhakta | Indian National Congress |
| 2009 | Bishnu Pada Ray | Bharatiya Janata Party |
| 2014 | Bishnu Pada Ray | Bharatiya Janata Party |
| 2019 | Kuldeep Rai Sharma | Indian National Congress |
| 2024 | Bishnu Pada Ray | Bharatiya Janata Party |

== Election results ==
=== General Election 2024 ===
2024 Indian general election: Andaman and Nicobar Islands
| Party | Candidate | Votes | % | ±% |
|---|---|---|---|---|
| BJP | Bishnu Pada Ray | 102,436 | 50.58 | +5.28 |
| INC | Kuldeep Rai Sharma | 78,040 | 38.54 | −7.44 |
| ANDC | Manoj Paul | 8,254 | 4.08 | New |
| CPI(M) | D. Ayyappan | 6,017 | 2.97 | N/A |
| IND | V.K. Abdul Aziz | 2,203 | 1.09 | N/A |
| NOTA | None of the above | 1,809 | 0.89 | +0.21 |
| Majority | | 23,996 | 12.04 | +11.36 |
| Turnout | | 202,514 | 64.26 | −0.95 |
| Registered electors | | 315,148 | | |
| BJP gain from INC | | Swing | | |

=== General Election 2019 ===
General elections, 2019: Andaman & Nicobar Islands
| Party | Candidate | Votes | % | ±% |
|---|---|---|---|---|
| INC | Kuldeep Rai Sharma | 95,308 | 45.98 | +2.29 |
| BJP | Vishal Jolly | 93,901 | 45.30 | −2.50 |
| Independent | Paritosh Kumar Haldar | 5,341 | 2.58 | +2.58 |
| AAP | Sanjay Meshack | 2,839 | 1.37 | −0.56 |
| BSP | Prakash Minj | 2,486 | 1.20 | N/A |
| AITC | Ayan Mandal | 1,721 | 0.83 | N/A |
| NOTA | None of the above | 1,412 | 0.68 | N/A |
| Margin of victory | | 1,407 | 0.68 | −3.43 |
| Turnout | | 207,296 | 65.21 | −5.45 |
| INC gain from BJP | | Swing | | |

=== General Election 2014 ===
General Election, 2014: Andaman & Nicobar Islands
| Party | Candidate | Votes | % | ±% |
|---|---|---|---|---|
| BJP | Bishnu Pada Ray | 90,969 | 47.80 | +3.59 |
| INC | Kuldeep Rai Sharma | 83,157 | 43.69 | +1.23 |
| AAP | Sanjay Meschack | 3,737 | 1.96 | N/A |
| AITC | Anita Mondal | 2,283 | 1.20 | N/A |
| NOTA | None of the Above | 1,564 | 0.82 | N/A |
| Margin of victory | | 7,812 | 4.11 | +2.36 |
| Turnout | | 1,90,328 | 70.66 | +6.50 |
| BJP hold | | Swing | | |

=== General Election 2009 ===
2009 Indian general election: Andaman and Nicobar Islands
| Party | Candidate | Votes | % | ±% |
|---|---|---|---|---|
| BJP | Bishnu Pada Ray | 75,211 | 44.21 | |
| INC | Kuldeep Rai Sharma | 72,221 | 42.46 | |
| CPI(M) | Tapan Kumar Bepari | 7,190 | 4.22 | |
| RJD | P. R. Ganeshan | 4,916 | 2.86 | |
| Margin of victory | | 2,990 | 1.75 | |
| Turnout | | 1,70,103 | 64.16 | |
| BJP gain from INC | | Swing | | |

=== General Election 2004 ===
2004 Indian general election: Andaman and Nicobar Islands
| Party | Candidate | Votes | % | ±% |
|---|---|---|---|---|
| INC | Manoranjan Bhakta | 85,794 | 55.77 | |
| BJP | Bishnu Pada Ray | 55,294 | 35.95 | |
| CPI(M) | Tapan Kumar Bepari | 4,175 | 2.71 | |
| Margin of victory | | 30,500 | 19.82 | |
| Turnout | | 1,53,825 | | |
| INC gain from BJP | | Swing | | |

=== General Election 1999 ===
1999 Indian general election: Andaman and Nicobar Islands
| Party | Candidate | Votes | % | ±% |
|---|---|---|---|---|
| BJP | Bishnu Pada Ray | 76,891 | 52.74 | |
| INC | Manoranjan Bhakta | 62,944 | 43.17 | |
| Independent | Agapil Kujur | 4,805 | 3.30 | |
| Margin of victory | | 13,947 | 9.57 | |
| Turnout | | 1,47,102 | 59.46 | |
| BJP gain from INC | | Swing | | |

=== General Election 1998 ===
1998 Indian general election: Andaman and Nicobar Islands
| Party | Candidate | Votes | % | ±% |
|---|---|---|---|---|
| INC | Manoranjan Bhakta | 52,365 | 35.91 | |
| BJP | Bishnu Pada Ray | 51,821 | 35.53 | |
| IC(S) | Kuldeep Rai Sharma | 29,687 | 20.36 | |
| CPI(M) | Tapan Kumar Bepari | 8,272 | 5.67 | |
| Margin of victory | | 544 | 0.38 | |
| Turnout | | 1,47,698 | 63.66 | |
| INC hold | | Swing | | |

=== General Election 1996 ===
1996 Indian general election: Andaman and Nicobar Islands
| Party | Candidate | Votes | % | ±% |
|---|---|---|---|---|
| INC | Manoranjan Bhakta | 74,642 | 58.22 | |
| BJP | Bishnu Pada Ray | 31,097 | 24.25 | |
| CPI(M) | Tapan Kumar Bepari | 18,363 | 14.32 | |
| Margin of victory | | 43,545 | 33.97 | |
| Turnout | | 1,30,918 | 61.98 | |
| INC hold | | Swing | | |

=== General Election 1991 ===
1991 Indian general election: Andaman and Nicobar Islands
| Party | Candidate | Votes | % | ±% |
|---|---|---|---|---|
| INC | Manoranjan Bhakta | 54,075 | 50.39 | |
| CPI(M) | Tapan Bepari | 47,374 | 44.14 | |
| BJP | Bishnu Pada Ray | 5,208 | 4.85 | |
| Margin of victory | | 6,701 | 6.25 | |
| Turnout | | | | |
| INC hold | | Swing | | |

=== General Election 1989 ===
1989 Indian general election: Andaman and Nicobar Islands
| Party | Candidate | Votes | % | ±% |
|---|---|---|---|---|
| INC | Manoranjan Bhakta | 53,383 | 47.21 | |
| CPI(M) | Tapan Bepari | 34,469 | 30.49 | |
| Indian Congress (Socialist) – Sarat Chandra Sinha | K. Kandaswamy | 19,172 | 16.96 | |
| Margin of victory | | 18,914 | 16.72 | |
| Turnout | | 115,403 | 71.71 | |
| INC hold | | Swing | | |

=== General Election 1984 ===
1984 Indian general election: Andaman and Nicobar Islands
| Party | Candidate | Votes | % | ±% |
|---|---|---|---|---|
| INC | Manoranjan Bhakta | 47,019 | 52.85 | |
| LKD | K. Kandaswamy | 27,883 | 31.34 | |
| CPI(M) | Nilima Das | 11,086 | 12.46 | |
| Margin of victory | | 19,136 | 21.51 | |
| Turnout | | 91,093 | 78.82 | |
| INC hold | | Swing | | |

=== General Election 1980 ===
1980 Indian general election: Andaman and Nicobar Islands
| Party | Candidate | Votes | % | ±% |
|---|---|---|---|---|
| INC | Manoranjan Bhakta | 42,046 | 53.29 | |
| CPI(M) | P. K. S. Prasad | 16,014 | 20.30 | |
| Independent | K. Kandaswamy | 15,856 | 20.10 | |
| JP | Samar Choudhary | 2,034 | 2.58 | |
| Margin of victory | | 26,032 | 32.99 | |
| Turnout | | 81,146 | 84.45 | |
| INC hold | | Swing | | |

=== General Election 1977 ===
1977 Indian general election: Andaman and Nicobar Islands
| Party | Candidate | Votes | % | ±% |
|---|---|---|---|---|
| INC | Manoranjan Bhakta | 35,400 | 58.45 | |
| Independent | K. R. Ganesh | 25,168 | 41.55 | |
| Margin of victory | | 10,232 | 16.90 | |
| Turnout | | 60,590 | 71.02 | |
| INC hold | | Swing | | |

=== General Election 1971 ===
1971 Indian general election: Andaman and Nicobar Islands
| Party | Candidate | Votes | % | ±% |
|---|---|---|---|---|
| INC | K. R. Ganesh | 27,373 | 61.48 | |
| Independent | P. K. S. Prasad | 10,040 | 22.55 | |
| Independent | Ramesh Chandra Muzumdar | 4,820 | 10.83 | |
| Margin of victory | | 17,333 | 38.93 | |
| Turnout | | 44,531 | 70.55 | |
| INC hold | | Swing | | |

=== General Election 1967 ===
1967 Indian general election: Andaman and Nicobar Islands
| Party | Candidate | Votes | % | ±% |
|---|---|---|---|---|
| INC | K. R. Ganesh | 19,310 | 52.57 | |
| Independent | P. K. S. Prasad | 9,270 | 25.24 | |
| DMK | K. Kandaswamy | 4,891 | 13.32 | |
| Margin of victory | | 10,040 | 27.33 | |
| Turnout | | 36,924 | 78.45 | |
| INC hold | | Swing | | |

== See also ==
- List of constituencies of the Lok Sabha
