= 2009 Indian general election =

- 16 April 2009 – 13 May 2009

543 of the 545 seats in the Lok Sabha 272 seats needed for a majority
- Registered: 716,985,101
- Turnout: 58.21% (▲0.14pp)
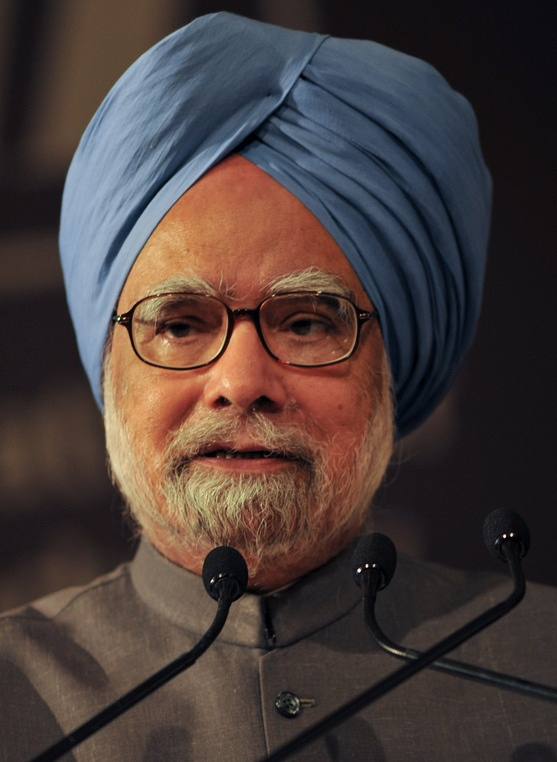

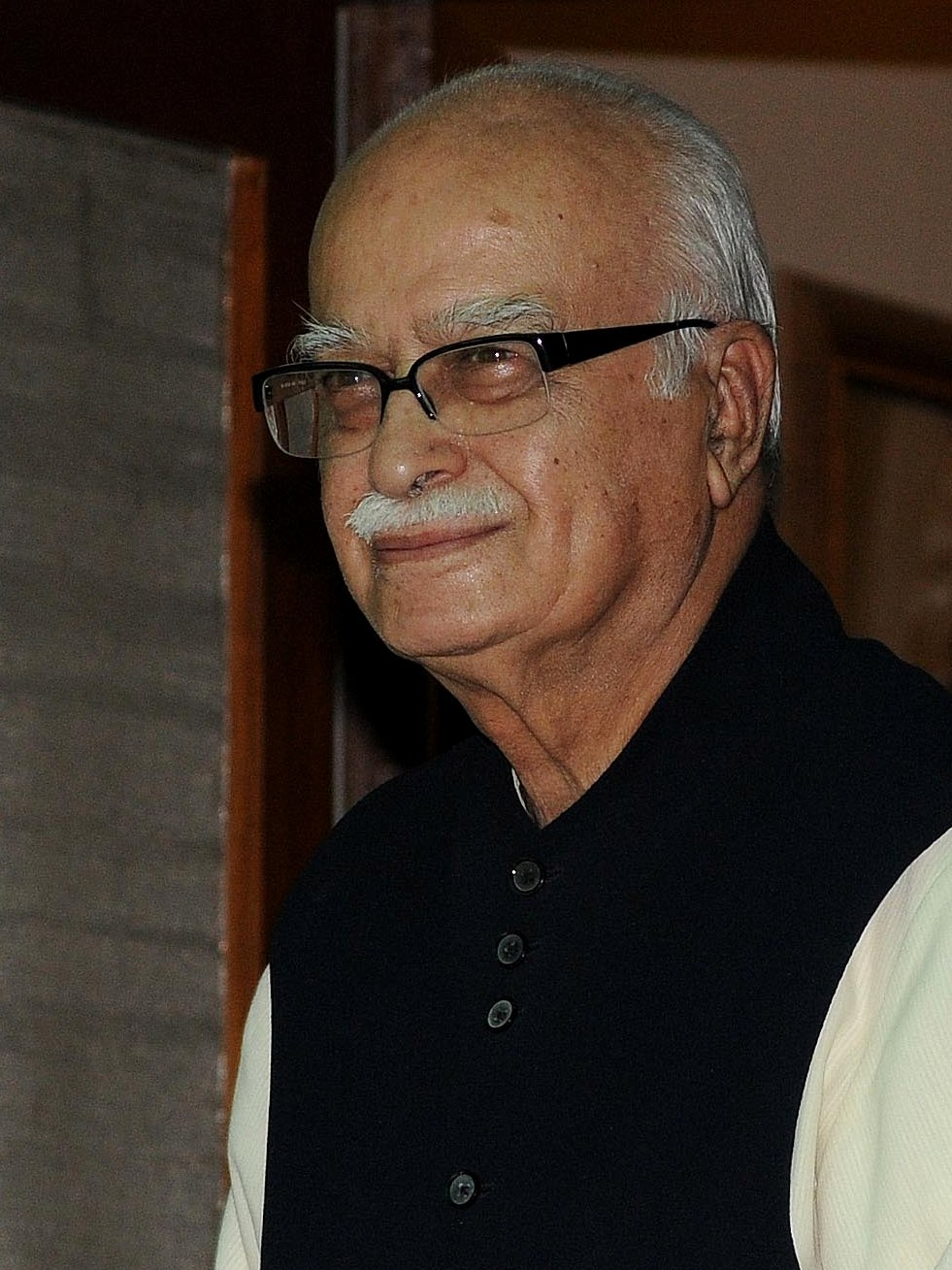

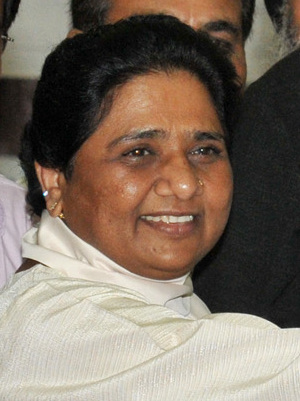

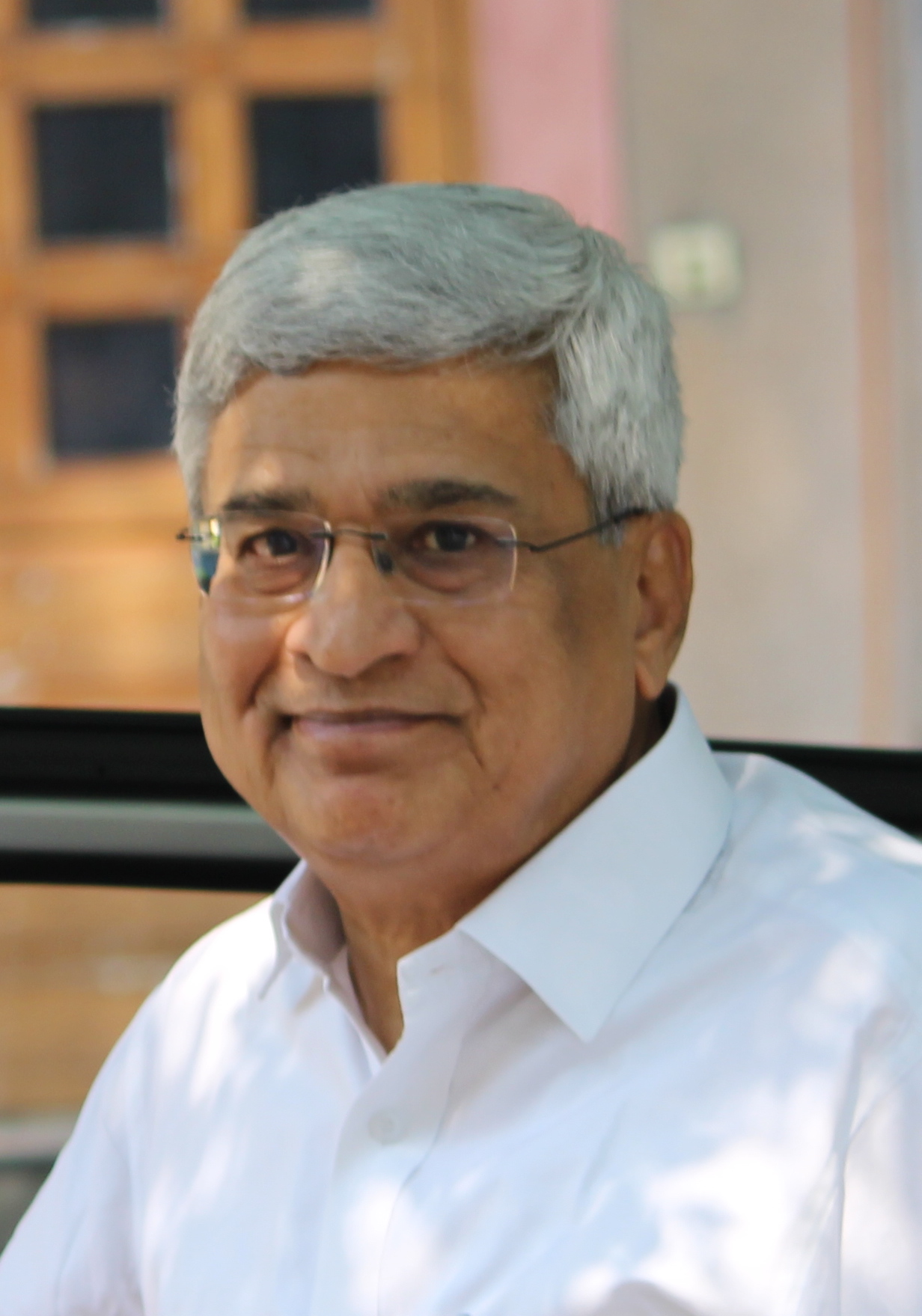
	First party	Second party	Third party
Leader	Manmohan Singh	L. K. Advani	Mayawati
Party	INC	BJP	BSP
Alliance	UPA	NDA
Last election	26.53%, 145 seats	22.16%, 138 seats	5.33%, 19 seats
Seats won	206	116	21
Seat change	▲61	▼22	▲2
Popular vote	119,111,019	78,435,381	25,728,920
Percentage	28.55%	18.8%	6.17%
Swing	▲2.02pp	▼3.36pp	▲0.84pp
Alliance seats	262	159	21
Seat change	New	▼22	▲2
	Fourth party
Leader	Prakash Karat
Party	CPI(M)
Alliance	TF
Last election	5.66%, 43 seats
Seats won	16
Seat change	▼27
Popular vote	22,219,111
Percentage	5.33%
Swing	▼0.33pp
Alliance seats	79
Seat change	New
Prime Minister before election
Manmohan Singh
INC
Prime Minister after election
Manmohan Singh
INC

General elections were held in India in five phases between 16 April 2009 and 13 May 2009 to elect the members of the fifteenth Lok Sabha. With a registered electorate of 716 million and a turnout of 417 million voters, it was the largest democratic election in the world until being surpassed by the 2014 general election.

By constitutional requirement, elections to the Lok Sabha must be held every five years or when Parliament is dissolved by the president. The previous elections were held in May 2004; the term of the 14th Lok Sabha would have naturally expired on 1 June 2009. The elections were organised by the Election Commission of India (ECI) and were held in multiple phases to better handle the large electorate and security concerns. In February 2009, Rs.11.20 billion ($200.5 million) was budgeted for election expenses by parliament.

A total of 8,070 candidates contested 543 seats elected in single-member constituencies using first-past-the-post voting. The National Democratic Alliance (NDA), led by the official opposition, the Bharatiya Janata Party (BJP), and the newly formed Third Front, led by Communist Party of India (Marxist) (CPI(M)) and mainly constituted of regional parties, challenged the Congress-led United Progressive Alliance (UPA) government of Prime Minister Manmohan Singh, making the election a triangular fight. Voter turnout over all five phases was around 58%. The results of the election were announced within three days of phase five, on 16 May.

The UPA returned to government with an increased majority, with strong results in Andhra Pradesh, Madhya Pradesh, Haryana, Kerala, Maharashtra, Rajasthan, Tamil Nadu, Uttar Pradesh and West Bengal; in all, there was support from 322 of the 543 elected members, including external support from the Bahujan Samaj Party (BSP), Samajwadi Party (SP), Janata Dal (Secular) (JD(S)), Rashtriya Janata Dal (RJD) and other minor parties. Manmohan Singh became the first prime minister since Jawaharlal Nehru in 1962 to be re-elected after completing a full five-year term. He was sworn in to his second term by President Pratibha Patil on 22 May 2009 in the Ashoka Hall, Rashtrapati Bhavan. He would go on to complete a full five-year term; however, the UPA would lose to the NDA in a landslide in the next election.

== Background ==
The election, while following the normal five-year cycle, came after a break in the first UPA alliance after the left parties withdrew their support due to the Indo-US nuclear deal and forcing a vote of confidence, which Singh's government survived.

== Electoral issues ==
=== Delimitation ===
The 2009 elections adopted re-drawn electoral constituencies based on the 2001 census, following the 2002 Delimitation Commission of India, whose recommendations were approved in February 2008.

In the 2009 general elections, 499 out of the total 543 Parliamentary constituencies were newly delimited constituencies. This affected the National Capital Region of Delhi, the Union Territory of Puducherry and all the states except Arunachal Pradesh, Assam, Jammu & Kashmir, Jharkhand, Manipur and Nagaland. While comparing election results, it must be borne in mind that in many instances a constituency with the same name may reflect a significantly different population demographic as well as a slightly altered geographical region.

=== Electronic voting machines ===
As in the 2004 election, this election was also conducted completely using electronic voting machines (EVMs), with 1,368,430 voting machines deployed across the country.

=== Polling stations ===
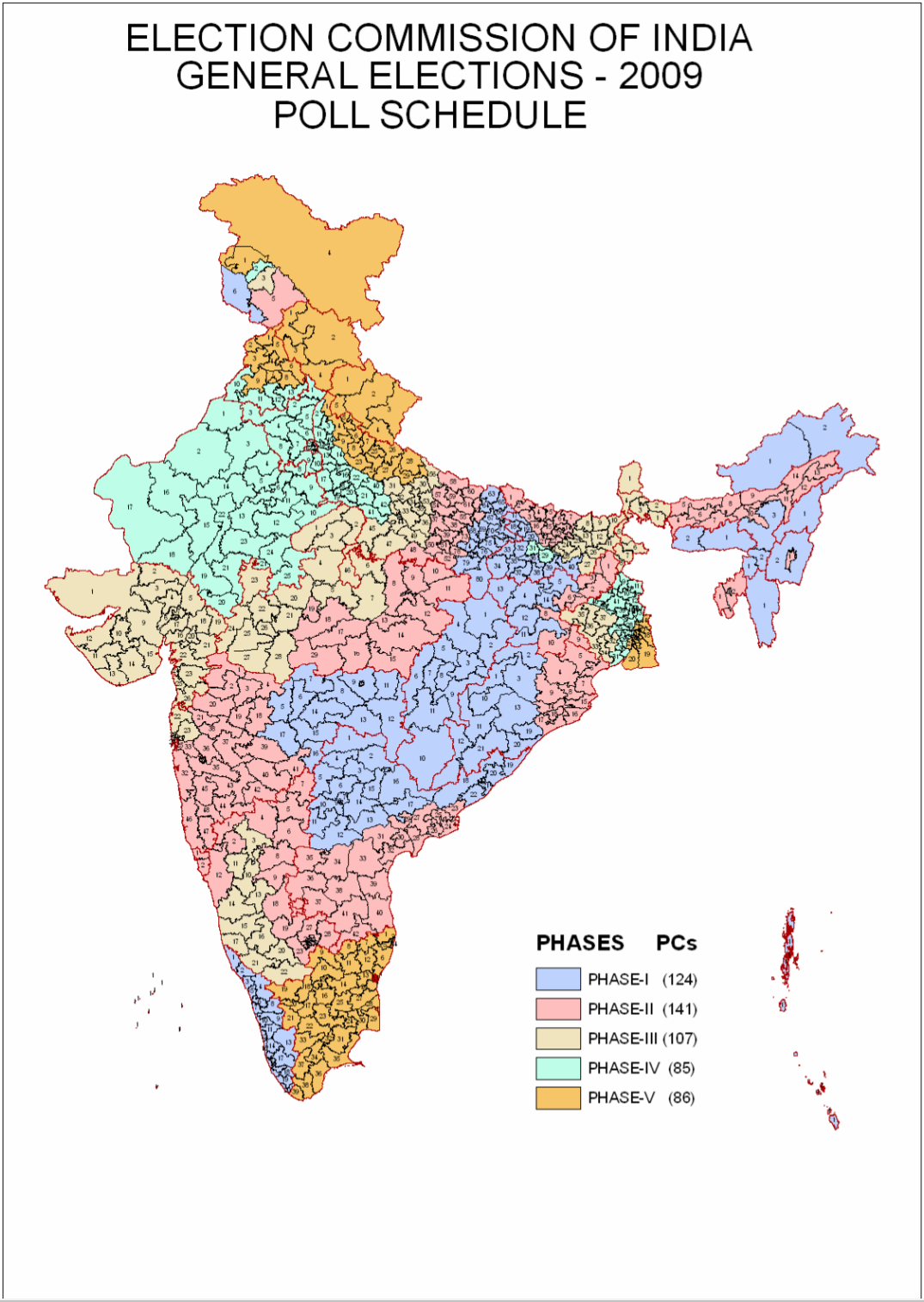
Election schedule (all phases)

There were 828,804 Polling Stations around the country – a 20% increase over the number from the 2004 election. This was done mainly to avoid vulnerability to threat and intimidation, to overcome geographical barriers and to reduce the distance travelled by voters.

The CEC announced that the polling station in Banej village in the Una segment of Junagadh, Gujarat had the unique claim to being the only polling station in the country that catered to a single elector – Guru Shree Bharatdasji Bapu, a priest of a Shiva temple in the middle of the Gir Forest.

=== Electoral rolls ===
The electoral rolls had to be completely updated because of the delimitation that took effect from February 2008. The process of updating the electoral rolls continued until the last date of filing nominations. 714 million people were eligible to vote in 2009, up 6.4% (43 million) from 2004.

This election also saw the entire country except the states of Assam, Nagaland and Jammu & Kashmir use photo electoral rolls. This meant that the photo of each elector was printed on the electoral rolls and this was intended to facilitate easy identification and prevent impersonations.

In addition to the photo electoral rolls, the electors also needed to provide separate photo identification. Those electors who had already been issued Electoral Photo Identification Cards (EPIC) were only permitted to use the EPIC for identification at the polling station. According to the EC, 82% of the country's electors (except those in Assam) have been issued EPIC before the 2009 election was announced.

=== Good Governance ===
The Exercise Franchise For Good Governance (EFG) was an Indian civil society organization formed in 2007, that aimed to encourage participation in elections. It believed that rise in citizen's participation strengthens political accountability. An accountable political system helps shape governance both from the perspective of Electors as well as Politicians. The founding members of the group are Dr Satbir Silas, Uttam Prakash, Sanjay Chadha, Ratan Lal, G Venkatesh, Yogendra Jha, U G Sujatha, Hemang P Jani.

EFG launched voter awareness campaign during the 2008 assembly elections in Delhi and the 2009 General Elections. It made two strategic interventions. The first was through its website where it disseminated information about candidates contesting elections. It opened a section called “EFG book of Commitment”, encouraging netizens to sign a commitment to vote.

The second intervention was through a “people to people contact” programme. Between March and May 2009, two campaigns namely “Respect Your Vote” and “Jog for Democracy” were organised.

“Respect Your Vote” was a nationwide campaign that reached out to citizens face-to-face. As a road show, it toured cities asking for people's commitment to vote through a formal signature. The signatures were taken on a Flex Board that read "Respect Your Vote and the Votes would Respect Your Aspirations". The idea was to bring in self-discipline for the target groups, mainly the educated youth and the middle class that shies away from voting. It covered the cities of Madurai, Chennai, Agra, Delhi, Ahmedabad and Kolkata. The programme found friends in local NGOs like Lions Clubs International, Agra Vikas Manch that supported and participated in the road show.

“Jog For Democracy” was launched at the elite Lodhi Gardens in Delhi on April 11, 2009. At the event, EFG volunteers from different backgrounds such as students, professors, corporate professionals, new tax payers, senior citizens and young women participated in good numbers. Wearing EFG T-shirts displaying messages that good governance begins with casting of a vote, fellow joggers were requested to commit to vote through a formal signature. The signatures were taken on a board that read “Respect Your Vote and the votes would respect your Aspirations”. There after the programme moved from one local park to another in colonies of Delhi culminating into a candlelit march at Jantar Mantar a day before Delhi went to polls.

EFG has been demanding inclusion "Do you have a Voters id Card?" on appeal applications under RTI. The idea is to distribute voter registration forms to such applicants who say "NO", as these are enlightened citizens who should also lead governance reforms through exercising franchise.

EFG is launching a new awareness campaign for 2014 general elections in India under the theme Promise2Vote

Some of the media that gave space to EFG include BBC, The News Today (Dhaka). and The Hindustan Times. Shrey Goyal, Asia Regional winner of an essay contest organised by World Youth Movement of Democracy, refers to EFG in the winning essay.

== Polling schedule ==
=== Background ===
The Chief Election Commissioner of India (CEC), N. Gopalaswami, had stated on 28 December 2008, that the elections were likely to be held between April and May 2009. He attributed this schedule to the examination period from February to March, making polling places unavailable.

On 31 January 2009, fractures within the Election Commission came to the fore when Gopalaswami recommended to President Pratibha Patil that Election Commissioner Navin Chawla be sacked for behaving in a partisan manner. This recommendation in itself was controversial, as it was unclear if a CEC had the legal and constitutional right to provide such a unilateral recommendation. Chawla refused to resign as he was expected to take over the post of Chief Election Commissioner a few months later.

This controversy also resulted in speculation that the Election Commission was unable to agree on the actual polling dates, with the incumbent CEC Gopalaswami preferring that at least one phase of elections be held before his retirement on 20 April 2009. Navin Chawla, on the other hand, wanted the election to only start after Gopalaswami retired.

Eventually, on 1 March 2009, President Patil rejected Gopalaswami's recommendation to remove Chawla after the Government advised her to do so. Soon after the above announcement by President Patil, the Election Commissioners got together to announce the details of the general election.

The polling schedule for the 2009 General Elections was announced by the Chief Election Commissioner on 2 March 2009.

Subsequently, the President's House announced on 4 March 2009 that CEC Gopalaswami would retire as scheduled on 20 April 2009 and Navin Chawla would take over as CEC starting 21 April 2009. It was the first time in the history of Indian politics that two different people oversaw different phases of the same election.

=== Polling schedule ===
Polling schedule by state/union territory
States/UTs	Constituencies	Phases	Phase 1		Phase 2		Phase 3		Phase 4		Phase 5		Avg Turnout
States/UTs	Constituencies	Phases	16 April	Turnout	22/23 April	Turnout	30 April	Turnout	7 May	Turnout	13 May	Turnout	
Andaman & Nicobar Islands	1	1	1	64.15%		–		–		–		–	64.15%
Andhra Pradesh	42	2	22	69.75%	20	75.50%		–		–		–	72.40%
Arunachal Pradesh	2	1	2	65.00%		–		–		–		–	65.00%
Assam	14	2	3	67.61%	11	70.06%		–		–		–	69.68%
Bihar	40	4	13	43.21%	13	45.83%	11	46.12%	3	37.00%		–	44.27%
Chandigarh	1	1		–		–		–		–	1	65.51%	65.51%
Chhattisgarh	11	1	11	58.19%		–		–		–		–	58.19%
Dadra & Nagar Haveli	1	1		–		–	1	73.22%		–		–	73.22%
Daman & Diu	1	1		–		–	1	71.85%		–		–	71.85%
Delhi	7	1		–		–		–	7	51.79%		–	51.79%
Goa	2	1		–	2	55.42%		–		–		–	55.42%
Gujarat	26	1		–		–	26	47.92%		–		–	47.92%
Haryana	10	1		–		–		–	10	67.67%		–	67.67%
Himachal Pradesh	4	1		–		–		–		–	4	58.35%	58.35%
Jammu & Kashmir	6	5	1	49.68%	1	44.73%	1	26.43%	1	25.38%	2	45.63%	39.66%
Jharkhand	14	2	6	51.16%	8	48.86%		–		–		–	49.77%
Karnataka	28	2		–	17	60.00%	11	58.48%		–		–	59.44%
Kerala	20	1	20	73.33%		–		–		–		–	73.33%
Lakshadweep	1	1	1	86.10%		–		–		–		–	86.10%
Madhya Pradesh	29	2		–	13	51.39%	16	51.22%		–		–	51.30%
Maharashtra	48	3	13	55.74%	25	49.18%	10	41.24%		–		–	49.17%
Manipur	2	2	1	83.70%	1	75.50%		–		–		–	79.80%
Meghalaya	2	1	2	64.40%		–		–		–		–	64.40%
Mizoram	1	1	1	50.93%		–		–		–		–	50.93%
Nagaland	1	1	1	90.21%		–		–		–		–	90.21%
Orissa	21	2	10	64.90%	11	62.00%		–		–		–	63.35%
Puducherry	1	1		–		–		–		–	1	79.70%	79.70%
Punjab	13	2		–		–		–	4	72.78%	9	68.13%	69.58%
Rajasthan	25	1		–		–		–	25	48.50%		–	48.50%
Sikkim	1	1		–		–	1	82.00%		–		–	82.00%
Tamil Nadu	39	1		–		–		–		–	39	72.46%	72.46%
Tripura	2	1		–	2	83.91%		–		–		–	83.91%
Uttar Pradesh	80	5	16	45.37%	17	45.48%	15	46.12%	18	48.00%	14	47.55%	46.45%
Uttarakhand	5	1		–		–		–		–	5	53.67%	53.67%
West Bengal	42	3		–		–	14	80.71%	17	82.60%	11	76.30%	78.93%
Total constituencies	543		124	59.07%	141	56.66%	107	52.12%	85	52.32%	86	65.74%	56.97%
Total states/UTs polling on this day			17	59.07%	13	56.66%	11	52.12%	8	52.32%	9	65.74%	56.97%
				States/UTs		Constituencies							
Number of states and UTs polling in single phase				22		164							
Number of states and UTs polling in two phases				8		163							
Number of states and UTs polling in three phases				2		90							
Number of states and UTs polling in four phases				1		40							
Number of states and UTs polling in five phases				2		86							
Total				35		543							
Source: Election Commission of India

== Coalitions ==
The 2009 general election saw three main national pre-poll alliances. Given the volatile nature of coalition politics in India, many parties changed alliances before, during and after the elections. The two larger coalitions, UPA and NDA, had clearly indicated their prime ministerial candidates during campaigning for the election. The Third Front announced repeatedly through the campaigning period that their prime ministerial candidate would only be decided after the election results came out. In Indian parliamentary system, the announcement of Prime Ministerial candidates prior to elections is not required.

=== United Progressive Alliance ===
Prime Minister candidate: Manmohan Singh (Indian National Congress (INC))

The United Progressive Alliance (UPA) was formed after the 2004 general election to bring together parties that either allied with the Congress in various states, or were willing to support a Congress-led national government. Though the UPA never enjoyed a clear majority on its own in the 14th Lok Sabha, it managed to complete its five-year term from 2004 to 2009 by securing outside support from the left parties (CPI(M), CPI, AIFB, RSP), Samajwadi Party and Bahujan Samaj Party at different times during this tenure.

Following the August 2008 confidence vote victory for the current government, a statement by Congress President Sonia Gandhi caused speculation that the UPA would project Prime Minister Manmohan Singh as the Prime Ministerial candidate in the next elections. While Dravida Munnetra Kazhagam (DMK) leader M. Karunanidhi supported Manmohan Singh as the PM candidate, Nationalist Congress Party (NCP) chief Sharad Pawar tried to project himself as a possible Prime Ministerial candidate as well. On 24 January 2009, Manmohan Singh underwent a cardiac bypass surgery at the All India Institute of Medical Sciences, New Delhi. Following the surgery, speculation of alternate PM candidates arose both within the Congress and amongst coalition partners. In an attempt to quell such speculations, Sonia Gandhi on 6 February 2009, confirmed that Manmohan Singh would be the UPA's PM candidate by writing so in the Congress party magazine Sandesh. This was the first time in the history of Indian elections that the Congress party had declared its Prime Ministerial candidate prior to the elections.

=== National Democratic Alliance ===
Prime Minister candidate: Lal Krishna Advani (Bharatiya Janata Party (BJP))

The National Democratic Alliance (NDA) was the first large national coalition formed by a national party supported by various regional parties. It was formed after the 1998 general election and the NDA formed the Government led by BJP's Atal Bihari Vajpayee. The government collapsed a few months later, but the NDA returned to power after the 1999 general election and this time the Vajpayee-led Government completed its full term from 1999 to 2004. Due to the volatile nature of coalitions, NDA won 181 seats after the 2004 election, but due to parties changing alliances, before the 2009 election they had 142 seats.

The main opposition party, BJP, and its NDA coalition partners announced on 11 December 2007 (more than a year before the election) that their candidate for prime minister would be BJP party leader Advani who was the Leader of the Opposition at the time. On 23 January 2008, leaders from BJP and other NDA parties convened in the capital to officially elect him as their candidate for the election.

=== Third Front ===
Seats: The newly formed alliance carried with them 109 seats before the 2009 election.
The CPI(M) led the formation of the Third Front for the 2009 election. This front was basically a collection of regional political parties who were neither in UPA nor in the NDA.

=== Fourth Front ===
Seats: The newly formed alliance carried with them 64 seats before the 2009 election.
The Samajwadi Party, Rashtriya Janata Dal and the Lok Janshakti Party failed to reach seat sharing agreements with the Congress and decided to form a new front, hoping to be kingmakers after the election. Despite announcing this front, the constituent parties continued to declare their support for the UPA.

== Campaign ==
=== United Progressive Alliance ===
The Congress party bought the rights for the Oscar-winning soundtrack "Jai Ho" from the movie Slumdog Millionaire, which was used as the official campaign tune by the party. The song title "Jai Ho" translates to 'Let there be victory', and the Congress hoped that the popular song would galvanise the masses during the almost one-month-long election season.

On 24 March 2009, Congress President Sonia Gandhi released the party's manifesto for the 2009 election. The manifesto highlighted all the achievements of the UPA Government over the last five years in power and identified improving various policies to favour more rural & under-privileged sections of the Indian society.

The Congress campaign ran into trouble when the Election Commission took exception to a full page advertisement on the 2010 Commonwealth Games taken out in major Delhi newspapers. The EC served notice to the Ministry of Youth Affairs and Sports, the Cabinet Secretary and the Chief Secretary of Delhi, stating that the advertisement was a clear violation of the model code of conduct since it enumerated the achievements of the UPA Government. The EC has also asked the violators to pay from their own pockets.

=== National Democratic Alliance ===
To counter the Congress' selection of "Jai Ho" as their official anthem, the BJP coined the phrase Kushal Neta,

On 3 April 2009, BJP released its election manifesto in New Delhi. The party was taking on the incumbent UPA Government on the three fronts of Good Governance, Development and Security. The manifesto highlighted all the different NDA policies that the UPA reversed over the last five years. The manifesto laid a lot of importance on requiring strong, POTA-like anti-terrorism laws and vowed to make India a safer place if the BJP is elected. The full text of the manifesto is available at the BJP website.

The BJP campaign faced its biggest controversy when the EC directed the District Magistrate of Pilibhit to lodge a criminal case against the BJP's candidate Varun Gandhi for his allegedly inflammatory speech against minority communities made on 7 March 2009. This decision was taken after the EC had earlier issued a notice to Varun Gandhi and the BJP. After reviewing the incident, the EC found Varun Gandhi guilty of violating the model code of conduct by creating feeling of enmity and hatred between different communities and issued a recommendation the BJP to drop him from their list of candidates. The BJP however came out in support of Varun and refused to drop him as a candidate.

=== Third Front ===
The Communist Party of India (Marxist) (CPI(M)) formed a Third Front. The Third Front tried to contest the election, hoping to create a non-BJP, non-Congress government, by attracting many local and regional parties, that were once with the other two alliances. The Third Front came into the alliance with 109 MPs, and various polling conducted before the election projected the alliance of getting over 100 seats. The CPI(M) created a campaign website hosting its campaign information to attract sympathisers among the netizen public to vote for the party.

=== Use of VoIP for campaigning ===
During this election, many political parties made use of new Voice over IP technology to campaign to rural and illiterate voters, a notable portion of whom could not read campaign messaging sent through SMS.

== Opinion polling ==
Most opinion polls conducted by major agencies gave the UPA an edge over the NDA, but none were predicted to get absolute majority. The UPA including the Fourth front was, however, predicted by a few to get seats close to majority. The opinion polls reckoned that other regional parties would play an important role by winning a substantial number of seats. In results where the "Fourth Front" is indicated, the SP, RJD and LJP are not being counted in the UPA figure.

=== Pre-poll surveys ===
Agency	Dates	Results		
Agency	Dates	UPA	NDA	Others
CNN-IBN–CSDS	8 Jan to 15/09	215–235	164–185	125–155
Star–Nielsen	5 to 17 March 2009	257 (Congress 144)	184 (BJP 137)	96
Star–Nielsen	26 Mar – 3 April 2009	203 (Congress 155)	191 (BJP 147)	Third Front 104, Fourth Front 39
CVoter–The Week	March–April 2009	234 (Congress 144)	186 (BJP 140)	Third Front 112
Times of India	March 2009	201 (Congress 146)	195 (BJP 138)	147
Actual Results	16 May 2009	262	159	79

=== Exit polls ===
In February 2009, the ECI banned the publishing of all exit polls starting 48 hours before Phase 1 of the election until the end of Phase 5. This was intended to prevent exit polls from earlier phases affecting voter decisions in later phases. The ban ended with the close of Phase 5 voting at 5:00 pm IST on 13 May.

Polling organisation			
Polling organisation	UPA	NDA	Others
CNN-IBN - Dainik Bhaskar	185-205	165-185	153-193
India TV-CVoter	189-201	183-195	147-171
Star-Nielsen	199	196	148
Headlines Today	191	180	172
Actual result	262	159	122
Sources:-

== Election phases ==
=== Phase 1 – 16 April 2009 ===
The first phase of the 2009 election took place on Thursday, 16 April with elections in 124 constituencies across 15 states and 2 union territories. There were incidents of violence in a few places in Chhattisgarh, Orissa, Bihar, Jharkhand and Maharashtra and between 17 and 19 people were killed in Naxal attacks. The dead included five poll officials and 10 security personnel, whose families received a compensation of Rs 1 million. Naxals set fire to voting machines, attacked voters, security personnel and polling workers, and destroyed vehicles. According to one news source, "It was apparent that the Naxals had clearly planned to disrupt the polls."

Despite these incidents, the ECI expressed satisfaction about the conduct of the polls due to peaceful polling in many other parts of the country. Initial reports from the ECI place the voter turnout for this phase at approximately 60 percent. This phase of the election was held in 185,000 polling stations, serving an electorate of over 143.1 million deciding the fate of 1,715 candidates.

The ECI ordered repoll in 46 polling booths across 7 of the states where polling took place in the first phase. These include 29 polling booths in Andhra Pradesh, 5 each in Assam and Arunachal Pradesh, 3 in Nagaland, 2 in Kerala and 1 each in Jammu & Kashmir and Uttar Pradesh. The repoll in all these polling booths were held on 18 April 2009.

One of the positive stories emerging from this phase of election was from Kandhamal district, where refugees of the 2008 Kandhamal riots came out in huge numbers to exercise their franchise. It is estimated that there was a turnout of 90% amongst Kandhamal refugees and 50% across the entire district. The administration had earlier identified large parts of the area as Naxal affected and vulnerable. Hence, the administration had deployed extra security in the area and the ECI has arranged for special transport to shuttle the refugees from the refugee camps to the polling booths. Both of these actions helped achieve the high turnout.

=== Phase 2 – 22 April 2009 and 23 April 2009 ===
The second phase of the 2009 election was spread across Wednesday, 22 April (Phase 2A) and Thursday, 23 April (Phase 2B). Phase 2A saw election in a single constituency in Manipur as it was a state holiday on 23 April.

According to the EC, the election in Manipur in Phase 2A was peaceful and witnessed a voter turnout of about 62%. Following the election, though, the Communist Party of India (CPI) and Manipur People's Party (MPP) have alleged vote rigging by Congress workers during the polls in Phase 2A. The MPP claimed that the Congress workers captured 11 booths in the Andro Assembly segment of Imphal East.

Phase 2B saw polling in 12 states for 140 constituencies – the most in any phase of this election. This phase was largely peaceful and saw about 55% turnout. There were stray incidents of violence in areas with active Naxalite groups in Jharkhand and Bihar. The poor turnout in this phase was blamed on a heat wave sweeping the country that took the noon-time temperature on election day up to between 42 and 46 degrees Celsius in various parts of the country. Two polling officials even died due to sun stroke in Orissa with two also falling ill.

=== Phase 3 – 30 April 2009 ===
The third phase of the 2009 election was held on Thursday, 30 April with elections in 107 constituencies spread across nine states and two union territories. The fate of 1,567 candidates was decided in this phase including those of Congress President Sonia Gandhi, BJP's Prime Minister candidate L.K. Advani and former Prime Minister and Janata Dal (Secular) President Deve Gowda. This phase included voting in Mumbai where the turnout was relatively low. The voter turnout around the country was moderate and this was primarily blamed on the extreme heat on election day. Voting was largely peaceful all across the country. However, Maoist guerrillas exploded a landmine in West Bengal's Purulia district, injuring a paramilitary trooper.

=== Phase 4 – 7 May 2009 ===
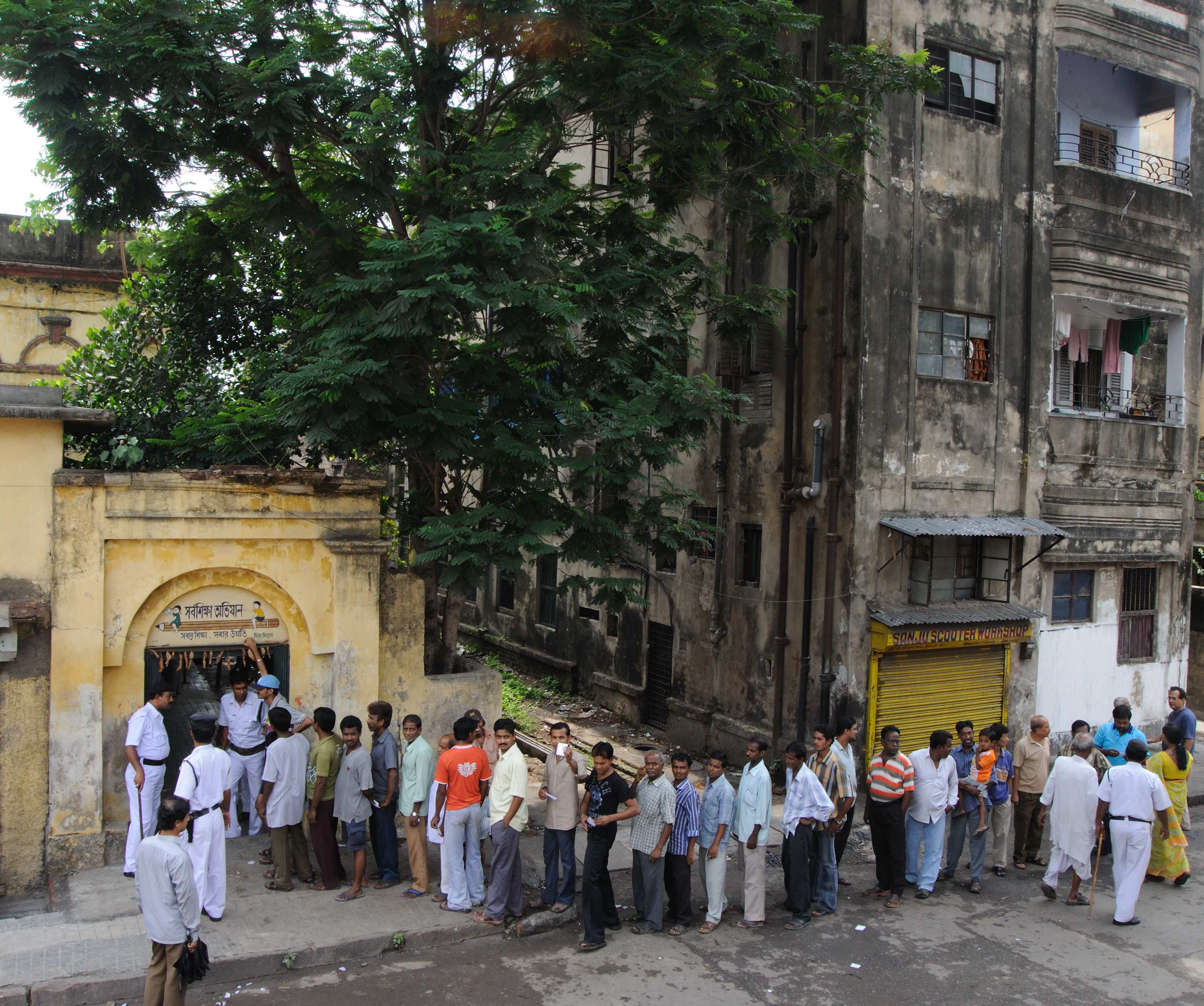
Queue outside a polling station in Kolkata 13 May 2009.

The fourth phase of the election was held on Thursday, 7 May with elections for 85 seats across eight states involving 1,315 candidates. The phase's high-profile candidates included External Affairs Minister Pranab Mukherjee and former chief ministers Mulayam Singh Yadav, Rajnath Singh, Lalu Prasad Yadav and Farooq Abdullah. Apart from bomb attacks in West Bengal's Asansol and Murshidabad districts that killed one person each and some violence in Rajasthan, this phase was relatively peaceful. This phase saw voting in the nation's capital Delhi where the voter turnout was around 53%, much higher than the previous two elections in Delhi.

=== Phase 5 – 13 May 2009 ===
The fifth and final phase of the 2009 election was held on Wednesday, 13 May with voting across seven states and two union territories for 86 constituencies. Overall the turnout was 62%. Numerous cases of voter omissions were reported in Tamil Nadu which had 39 seats up for grab. In Jammu & Kashmir, two polling stations could not be reached by the polling officials due to extreme snow which prevented their helicopters from landing at the site. The polling officials were forced to trek through deep snow to reach the polling stations and polls took place 2 days later on 15 May in these two stations. A few cases of violence were also reported in this phase. One DMK official was stabbed to death in Tamil Nadu in a clash between the political parties and another person was killed in West Bengal in clashes between Trinamool Congress and CPI(M) party workers.

== Voter turnout ==
State/UT	Total electors	Total voters	Total turnout	Total seats
Andaman & Nicobar Islands (UT)	265,108	170,713	64.16%	1
Andhra Pradesh	57,892,259	42,086,701	72.70%	42
Arunachal Pradesh	734,541	500,701	68.17%	2
Assam	17,470,329	12,149,244	69.54%	14
Bihar	54,505,246	24,236,447	44.47%	40
Chandigarh (UT)	524,444	343,558	65.51%	1
Chhattisgarh	15,476,577	8,556,714	55.29%	11
Dadra & Nagar Haveli (UT)	150,704	110,363	73.23%	1
Daman & Diu (UT)	95,382	68,025	71.32%	1
Goa	1,020,794	564,439	55.29%	2
Gujarat	36,484,281	17,476,688	47.90%	26
Haryana	12,087,710	8,160,212	67.51%	10
Himachal Pradesh	4,606,674	2,691,632	58.43%	4
Jammu & Kashmir	6,572,896	2,609,249	39.70%	6
Jharkhand	17,934,095	9,142,557	50.98%	14
Karnataka	41,790,939	24,581,348	58.82%	28
Kerala	21,859,536	16,041,499	73.38%	20
Lakshadweep (UT)	45,983	39,498	85.90%	1
Madhya Pradesh	38,085,179	19,488,923	51.17%	29
Maharashtra	72,954,058	37,007,538	50.73%	48
Manipur	1,736,251	1,342,309	77.31%	2
Meghalaya	1,277,739	822,614	64.38%	2
Mizoram	629,374	326,424	51.86%	1
Nagaland	1,321,878	1,189,742	90.00%	1
NCT OF Delhi	11,096,854	5,754,356	51.86%	7
Orissa	27,194,864	17,772,025	65.35%	21
Puducherry (UT)	762,440	608,509	79.81%	1
Punjab	16,958,380	11,833,887	69.78%	13
Rajasthan	37,060,011	17,942,477	48.41%	25
Sikkim	300,584	252,275	83.93%	1
Tamil Nadu	41,620,460	30,405,063	73.05%	39
Tripura	2,082,265	1,760,485	84.55%	2
Uttar Pradesh	116,006,374	55,435,386	47.79%	80
Uttarakhand	5,887,724	3,145,818	53.43%	5
West Bengal	52,493,168	42,740,865	81.42%	42
India	716,985,101	417,357,674	58.21%	543

== Results ==
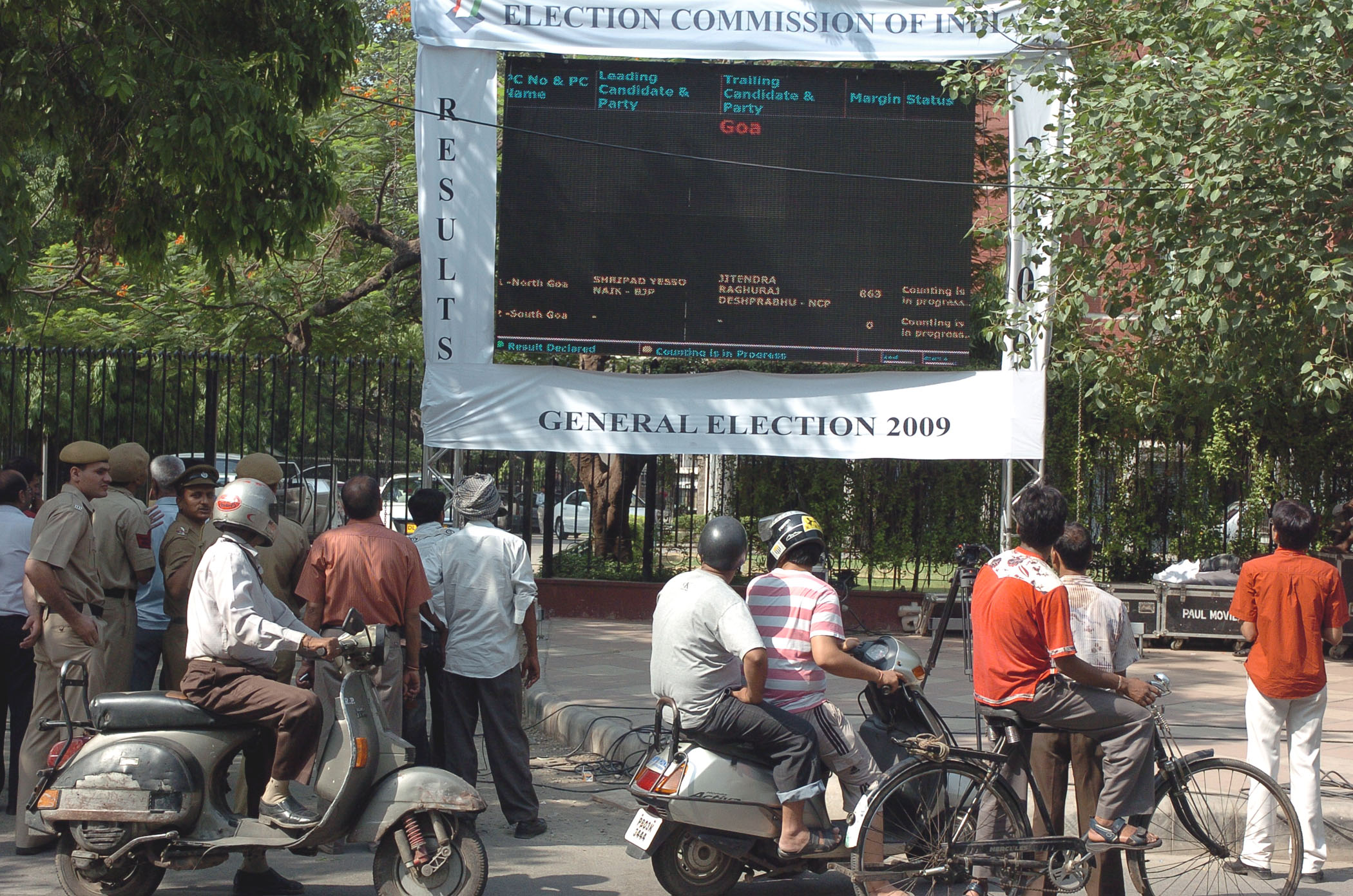
The Electronic Digital Display Board at the office of the Election Commission of India displaying the results of General Election-2009 for the public, at Nirvachan Sadan, in New Delhi on May 16, 2009

Vote counting took place on 16 May and the result were declared the same day. The EVMs were localised to 1,080 centres across the country and counting started at 08:00 hrs. The United Progressive Alliance (UPA) took early lead and maintained it to emerge victorious. Bharatiya Janata Party (BJP) leader Rajnath Singh said that the BJP's performance in the election was very unexpected and the success of the NDA that had been hoped for had not materialised. The CPI (M) led third front later said that it was ready to sit in the opposition.

Party	Votes	%	Seats
Indian National Congress	119,111,019	28.55	206
Bharatiya Janata Party	78,435,381	18.80	116
Bahujan Samaj Party	25,728,920	6.17	21
Communist Party of India (Marxist)	22,219,111	5.33	16
Samajwadi Party	14,284,638	3.42	23
All India Trinamool Congress	13,356,510	3.20	19
Telugu Desam Party	10,481,659	2.51	6
Nationalist Congress Party	8,521,502	2.04	9
Dravida Munnetra Kazhagam	7,625,397	1.83	18
All India Anna Dravida Munnetra Kazhagam	6,953,591	1.67	9
Biju Janata Dal	6,612,552	1.59	14
Praja Rajyam Party	6,590,046	1.58	0
Shiv Sena	6,454,950	1.55	11
Janata Dal (United)	6,331,201	1.52	20
Communist Party of India	5,951,888	1.43	4
Rashtriya Janata Dal	5,280,084	1.27	4
Shiromani Akali Dal	4,004,789	0.96	4
Janata Dal (Secular)	3,434,082	0.82	3
Desiya Murpokku Dravida Kazhagam	3,126,117	0.75	0
Telangana Rashtra Samithi	2,582,326	0.62	2
Assam United Democratic Front	2,184,553	0.52	1
Pattali Makkal Katchi	1,944,619	0.47	0
Lok Jan Shakti Party	1,891,963	0.45	0
Rashtriya Lok Dal	1,821,054	0.44	5
Asom Gana Parishad	1,773,103	0.43	1
Jharkhand Mukti Morcha	1,665,173	0.40	2
Revolutionary Socialist Party	1,573,650	0.38	2
Maharashtra Navnirman Sena	1,503,863	0.36	0
All India Forward Bloc	1,345,803	0.32	2
Indian National Lok Dal	1,286,573	0.31	0
Marumalarchi Dravida Munnetra Kazhagam	1,112,908	0.27	1
Communist Party of India (Marxist–Leninist) Liberation	1,044,510	0.25	0
Jharkhand Vikas Morcha (Prajatantrik)	963,274	0.23	1
Muslim League Kerala State Committee	877,494	0.21	2
Nagaland Peoples Front	832,224	0.20	1
Haryana Janhit Congress (BL)	816,395	0.20	1
Viduthalai Chiruthaigal Katchi	735,847	0.18	1
Bodoland People's Front	656,430	0.16	1
Kongunadu Munnetra Kazhagam	579,703	0.14	0
Lok Satta Party	557,376	0.13	0
Peace Party	537,638	0.13	0
Jammu and Kashmir Peoples Democratic Party	522,760	0.13	0
Jammu & Kashmir National Conference	498,374	0.12	3
Apna Dal	495,032	0.12	0
Bharipa Bahujan Mahasangh	492,470	0.12	0
Swabhimani Paksha	481,025	0.12	1
Kerala Congress (M)	404,962	0.10	1
Republican Party of India (Athawale)	379,746	0.09	0
Kerala Congress	333,688	0.08	0
Suheldev Bhartiya Samaj Party	319,307	0.08	0
All India Majlis-e-Ittehadul Muslimeen	308,061	0.07	1
Republican Party of India	294,650	0.07	0
Pyramid Party of India	287,576	0.07	0
Loktantrik Samata Dal	270,040	0.06	0
Mahagujarat Janta Party	245,174	0.06	0
People's Democratic Alliance	224,719	0.05	0
Bahujan Vikas Aaghadi	223,234	0.05	1
Gondwana Ganatantra Party	220,741	0.05	0
Rashtriya Samaj Paksha	215,042	0.05	0
All Jharkhand Students Union	200,523	0.05	0
Swatantra Bharat Paksh	188,608	0.05	0
Indian Justice Party	177,759	0.04	0
Sikkim Democratic Front	159,351	0.04	1
Rashtriya Samanta Dal	153,455	0.04	0
Rashtriya Swabhimaan Party	152,633	0.04	0
Rashtrawadi Sena	144,735	0.03	0
Rashtriya Dehat Morcha Party	139,404	0.03	0
Samruddha Odisha	131,379	0.03	0
Janvadi Party (Socialist)	129,595	0.03	0
Jharkhand Party	125,900	0.03	0
United Democratic Party	124,402	0.03	0
Autonomous State Demand Committee	123,287	0.03	0
Puthiya Tamilagam	120,797	0.03	0
Lok Bhalai Party	118,470	0.03	0
Jharkhand Party (Naren)	104,600	0.03	0
Jharkhand Disom Party	102,698	0.02	0
Manipur Peoples Party	101,787	0.02	0
286 other parties with fewer than 100,000 votes	4,005,695	0.96	0
Independents	21,647,686	5.19	9
Nominated Anglo-Indians			2
Total	417,159,281	100.00	545
Valid votes	417,159,281	99.95	
Invalid/blank votes	198,705	0.05	
Total votes	417,357,986	100.00	
Registered voters/turnout	716,985,101	58.21	
Source: ECI

== Results By Region ==
Region	States	Total Seats	Party	Won	Change
Northern	Jammu & Kashmir (6); Himachal Pradesh (4); Haryana (10); Punjab(13); Uttarakhand(5); Uttar Pradesh (80)	118	Indian National Congress	46	▲20
Northern	Jammu & Kashmir (6); Himachal Pradesh (4); Haryana (10); Punjab(13); Uttarakhand(5); Uttar Pradesh (80)	118	Samajwadi Party	23	▼13
Northern	Jammu & Kashmir (6); Himachal Pradesh (4); Haryana (10); Punjab(13); Uttarakhand(5); Uttar Pradesh (80)	118	Bahujan Samaj Party	20	▲1
Northern	Jammu & Kashmir (6); Himachal Pradesh (4); Haryana (10); Punjab(13); Uttarakhand(5); Uttar Pradesh (80)	118	Bharatiya Janata Party	14	▼4
Northern	Jammu & Kashmir (6); Himachal Pradesh (4); Haryana (10); Punjab(13); Uttarakhand(5); Uttar Pradesh (80)	118	Shiromani Akali Dal	4	▼4
Northern	Jammu & Kashmir (6); Himachal Pradesh (4); Haryana (10); Punjab(13); Uttarakhand(5); Uttar Pradesh (80)	118	Jammu & Kashmir National Conference	3	▲1
Northern	Jammu & Kashmir (6); Himachal Pradesh (4); Haryana (10); Punjab(13); Uttarakhand(5); Uttar Pradesh (80)	118	Haryana Janhit Congress	1	New
Northern	Jammu & Kashmir (6); Himachal Pradesh (4); Haryana (10); Punjab(13); Uttarakhand(5); Uttar Pradesh (80)	118	Rashtriya Lok Dal	1	▼2
Northern	Jammu & Kashmir (6); Himachal Pradesh (4); Haryana (10); Punjab(13); Uttarakhand(5); Uttar Pradesh (80)	118	Independent Politician	3	▲1
Western	Rajasthan (25); Gujarat (26); Maharashtra (48); Goa (2)	101	Indian National Congress	49	▲19
Western	Rajasthan (25); Gujarat (26); Maharashtra (48); Goa (2)	101	Bharatiya Janata Party	29	▼20
Western	Rajasthan (25); Gujarat (26); Maharashtra (48); Goa (2)	101	Shiv Sena	11	▼1
Western	Rajasthan (25); Gujarat (26); Maharashtra (48); Goa (2)	101	Nationalist Congress Party	8	▼1
Western	Rajasthan (25); Gujarat (26); Maharashtra (48); Goa (2)	101	Swabhimani Paksha	1	▲1
Western	Rajasthan (25); Gujarat (26); Maharashtra (48); Goa (2)	101	Bahujan Vikas Aaghadi	1	▲1
Western	Rajasthan (25); Gujarat (26); Maharashtra (48); Goa (2)	101	Independent Politician	2	▲2
Central	Madhya Pradesh (29); Chhattisgarh (11)	40	Bharatiya Janata Party	26	▼9
Central	Madhya Pradesh (29); Chhattisgarh (11)	40	Indian National Congress	13	▲8
Central	Madhya Pradesh (29); Chhattisgarh (11)	40	Bahujan Samaj Party	1	▲1
Southern	Karnataka (28); Andhra Pradesh (42); Tamil Nadu (39); Kerala (20)	129	Indian National Congress	60	▲13
Southern	Karnataka (28); Andhra Pradesh (42); Tamil Nadu (39); Kerala (20)	129	Bharatiya Janata Party	19	▲1
Southern	Karnataka (28); Andhra Pradesh (42); Tamil Nadu (39); Kerala (20)	129	Dravida Munnetra Kazhagam	17	▲1
Southern	Karnataka (28); Andhra Pradesh (42); Tamil Nadu (39); Kerala (20)	129	All India Anna Dravida Munnetra Kazhagam	9	▲9
Southern	Karnataka (28); Andhra Pradesh (42); Tamil Nadu (39); Kerala (20)	129	Telugu Desam Party	6	▲1
Southern	Karnataka (28); Andhra Pradesh (42); Tamil Nadu (39); Kerala (20)	129	Communist Party of India	5	▼10
Southern	Karnataka (28); Andhra Pradesh (42); Tamil Nadu (39); Kerala (20)	129	Janata Dal	3	Steady
Southern	Karnataka (28); Andhra Pradesh (42); Tamil Nadu (39); Kerala (20)	129	Telangana Rashtra Samithi	2	▼3
Southern	Karnataka (28); Andhra Pradesh (42); Tamil Nadu (39); Kerala (20)	129	Indian Union Muslim League	2	▲1
Southern	Karnataka (28); Andhra Pradesh (42); Tamil Nadu (39); Kerala (20)	129	Communist Party of India	1	▼3
Southern	Karnataka (28); Andhra Pradesh (42); Tamil Nadu (39); Kerala (20)	129	Viduthalai Chiruthaigal Katchi	1	▲1
Southern	Karnataka (28); Andhra Pradesh (42); Tamil Nadu (39); Kerala (20)	129	All India Majlis-e-Ittehadul Muslimeen	1	Steady
Southern	Karnataka (28); Andhra Pradesh (42); Tamil Nadu (39); Kerala (20)	129	Marumalarchi Dravida Munnetra Kazhagam	1	▼3
Southern	Karnataka (28); Andhra Pradesh (42); Tamil Nadu (39); Kerala (20)	129	Kerala Congress	1	Steady
Eastern	Bihar (40); Jharkhand (14); Odisha (21); West Bengal (42)	117	Bharatiya Janata Party	21	▲8
Eastern	Bihar (40); Jharkhand (14); Odisha (21); West Bengal (42)	117	Janata Dal	20	▲14
Eastern	Bihar (40); Jharkhand (14); Odisha (21); West Bengal (42)	117	All India Trinamool Congress	19	▲18
Eastern	Bihar (40); Jharkhand (14); Odisha (21); West Bengal (42)	117	Indian National Congress	15	▼2
Eastern	Bihar (40); Jharkhand (14); Odisha (21); West Bengal (42)	117	Biju Janata Dal	14	▲3
Eastern	Bihar (40); Jharkhand (14); Odisha (21); West Bengal (42)	117	Communist Party of India	10	▼16
Eastern	Bihar (40); Jharkhand (14); Odisha (21); West Bengal (42)	117	Rashtriya Janata Dal	4	▼18
Eastern	Bihar (40); Jharkhand (14); Odisha (21); West Bengal (42)	117	Jharkhand Mukti Morcha	2	▼2
Eastern	Bihar (40); Jharkhand (14); Odisha (21); West Bengal (42)	117	Communist Party of India	2	▼1
Eastern	Bihar (40); Jharkhand (14); Odisha (21); West Bengal (42)	117	Revolutionary Socialist Party	2	▼1
Eastern	Bihar (40); Jharkhand (14); Odisha (21); West Bengal (42)	117	All India Forward Bloc	2	▼1
Eastern	Bihar (40); Jharkhand (14); Odisha (21); West Bengal (42)	117	Socialist Unity Centre of India	1	▲1
Eastern	Bihar (40); Jharkhand (14); Odisha (21); West Bengal (42)	117	Jharkhand Vikas Morcha	1	New
Eastern	Bihar (40); Jharkhand (14); Odisha (21); West Bengal (42)	117	Independent politician	4	▲4
North-East	Assam (14); Arunachal Pradesh (2); Meghalaya (2); Manipur (2); Mizoram (1); Nagaland(1); Sikkim(1); Tripura (2)	25	Indian National Congress	13	▲2
North-East	Assam (14); Arunachal Pradesh (2); Meghalaya (2); Manipur (2); Mizoram (1); Nagaland(1); Sikkim(1); Tripura (2)	25	Bharatiya Janata Party	4	Steady
North-East	Assam (14); Arunachal Pradesh (2); Meghalaya (2); Manipur (2); Mizoram (1); Nagaland(1); Sikkim(1); Tripura (2)	25	Communist Party of India	2	Steady
North-East	Assam (14); Arunachal Pradesh (2); Meghalaya (2); Manipur (2); Mizoram (1); Nagaland(1); Sikkim(1); Tripura (2)	25	All India United Democratic Front	1	New
North-East	Assam (14); Arunachal Pradesh (2); Meghalaya (2); Manipur (2); Mizoram (1); Nagaland(1); Sikkim(1); Tripura (2)	25	Asom Gana Parishad	1	▼1
North-East	Assam (14); Arunachal Pradesh (2); Meghalaya (2); Manipur (2); Mizoram (1); Nagaland(1); Sikkim(1); Tripura (2)	25	Naga People's Front	1	Steady
North-East	Assam (14); Arunachal Pradesh (2); Meghalaya (2); Manipur (2); Mizoram (1); Nagaland(1); Sikkim(1); Tripura (2)	25	Sikkim Democratic Front	1	Steady
North-East	Assam (14); Arunachal Pradesh (2); Meghalaya (2); Manipur (2); Mizoram (1); Nagaland(1); Sikkim(1); Tripura (2)	25	Bodoland People's Front	1	New
North-East	Assam (14); Arunachal Pradesh (2); Meghalaya (2); Manipur (2); Mizoram (1); Nagaland(1); Sikkim(1); Tripura (2)	25	Nationalist Congress Party	1	▲1
Union Territories	Chandigarh (1); Delhi (7); Dadra & Nagar Haveli (1); Daman & Diu (1); Lakshadweep (1); Puducherry (1); Andaman & Nicobar(1)	13	Indian National Congress	10	▼1
Union Territories	Chandigarh (1); Delhi (7); Dadra & Nagar Haveli (1); Daman & Diu (1); Lakshadweep (1); Puducherry (1); Andaman & Nicobar(1)	13	Bharatiya Janata Party	3	▲2
Total	29 States and 7 UT	543			

=== Summary ===
Region	Total Seats	Indian National Congress		Bharatiya Janata Party		Others	
South India	130	61	▲13	19	▲2	50	▼15
West India	78	29	▲2	27	▼1	22	▼1
Hindi-Heartland	225	79	▲33	63	▼15	83	▼18
North-East India	25	13	▲2	4	Steady	8	▼5
East India	63	12	▲4	1	▼6	50	▲2
Union Territories	22	12	▲7	1	Steady	9	▼1
Total	543	206	+61	115	-22	222	-38
Source: Times of India

=== By states and territories ===
The UPA carried 18 states, while the NDA and the Third Front carried 8 and 2 respectively.

Source: Election Commission of India
State/Union Territory	Seats				
State/Union Territory	Seats	UPA	NDA	TFR	OTH
A & N Islands	1	—N/a	1	—N/a	—N/a
Andhra Pradesh	42	34	—N/a	8	—N/a
Arunachal Pradesh	2	2	—N/a	—N/a	—N/a
Assam	14	7	5	—N/a	2
Bihar	40	2	32	—N/a	6
Chandigarh	1	1	1	—N/a	—N/a
Chhattisgarh	11	1	10	—N/a	—N/a
Dadra and Nagar Haveli	1	—N/a	1	—N/a	—N/a
Daman and Diu	1	—N/a	1	—N/a	—N/a
Delhi	7	7	—N/a	—N/a	—N/a
Goa	2	1	1	—N/a	—N/a
Gujarat	26	11	15	—N/a	—N/a
Haryana	10	9	—N/a	1	—N/a
Himachal Pradesh	4	1	3	—N/a	—N/a
Jammu and Kashmir	6	5	—N/a	—N/a	1
Jharkhand	14	3	8	—N/a	3
Karnataka	28	6	19	3	—N/a
Kerala	20	16	—N/a	4	—N/a
Lakshadweep	1	1	—N/a	—N/a	—N/a
Madhya Pradesh	29	12	16	1	—N/a
Maharashtra	48	25	20	—N/a	3
Manipur	2	2	—N/a	—N/a	—N/a
Meghalaya	2	2	—N/a	—N/a	—N/a
Mizoram	1	1	—N/a	—N/a	—N/a
Nagaland	1	—N/a	—N/a	—N/a	1
Orissa	21	6	—N/a	15	—N/a
Puducherry	1	1	—N/a	—N/a	—N/a
Punjab	13	8	5	—N/a	—N/a
Rajasthan	25	20	4	—N/a	1
Sikkim	1	—N/a	—N/a	—N/a	1
Tamil Nadu	39	27	—N/a	12	—N/a
Tripura	2	—N/a	—N/a	2	—N/a
Uttar Pradesh	80	21	15	20	24
Uttarakhand	5	5	—N/a	—N/a	—N/a
West Bengal	42	25	1	15	1
Total	543	262	159	79	43

== Reactions ==
President of Bharatiya Janata Party, Rajnath Singh conceded defeat on behalf of his party after seeing the trends of vote counting on the day of result.

== Analysis ==
This election defied the predictions made by pre-poll predictions and exit polls and resulted in a new mandate for incumbent UPA government. According to analysts after the election, many factors can be attributed for a landslide. The National Election Study 2009, published in The Hindu newspaper after the election, attributed the victory of the UPA government to the saturation of caste-based identity politics, focus on good governance and BJP's limitations. Another factor was the vote-splitting by the Third Front, especially the BSP and MNS in Maharashtra, which resulted in the Indian National Congress gaining many of its seats without getting a majority in the corresponding constituency.

== Formation of the new government ==
Support for the United Progressive Alliance government in the 15th Lok Sabha
Party/Alliance	Seats won	Seat %
United Progressive Alliance	262	48.25%
Outside support
Samajwadi Party	23	4.20%
Bahujan Samaj Party	21	3.86%
Rashtriya Janata Dal	4	0.7%
Janata Dal (Secular)	3	0.55%
Independents and other parties	3	0.55%
Total	322	59.4%

The President, Pratibha Patil dissolved the 14th Lok Sabha with immediate effect on 18 May. Prime Minister Manmohan Singh submitted the resignation of his Council of Ministers to the President, for him to be re-elected as the Prime Minister as well as for a new Council of Ministers to be elected. On 19 May, Manmohan Singh and Sonia Gandhi were re-elected as party leader and chairperson respectively of the Congress Parliamentary Party. The vote set him up to return as prime minister. President Pratibha Patil invited Singh to then form the new government on 20 May. The new government was sworn in on 22 May.

=== Government formation ===
Due to the fact that UPA was able to get 262 seats – just short of 10 seats for a majority – all the external support came from parties who gave unconditional support to Manmohan Singh and the UPA. The Janata Dal, the Rashtriya Janata Dal, the Bahujan Samaj Party and the Samajwadi Party all decided to do so to keep out any possibility of a BJP government in the next 5 years. Nagaland Peoples Front, Sikkim Democratic Front, and Bodaland Peoples Front, each with an MP, decided to join and support the UPA government. The three independent candidates to extend support for UPA were all from Maharashtra, and they were Sadashiv Mandlik, from Kolhapur constituency, Raju Shetty, from the political party Swabhimani Paksha, who won from Hatkandagle and Baliram Jadhav from Bahujan Vikas Aghadi party who won the Palghar constituency.

On 21 May, it was announced that the Dravida Munnetra Kazhagam (DMK) had decided to leave and give outside support to the UPA government, due to failed talks between the Congress and the DMK on cabinet positions. After many deliberations between DMK and Congress, the DMK agreed to 3 cabinet ministers and 4 ministers of state. Kanimozhi, daughter of the DMK leader M. Karunanidhi, decided not to join the new government cabinet, instead she wanted to focus on improving the parties image. The two incumbent cabinet ministers from DMK, Dayanidhi Maran and A. Raja joined the cabinet, but due to concerns raised by Prime Minister Manmohan Singh on T.R. Baalu, he was dropped from the cabinet, and Karunanidhi's son M.K. Azhagiri, replaced him as part of a compromise. On 25 May 2009, DMK decided to join the UPA government, reversing the decision made in prior days to extend outside support.

== See also ==
- List of members of the 15th Lok Sabha
- 2009 Indian general election by state or union territory
