= Northeast India =

Group of Indian states

Northeast India North Eastern Region (NER)
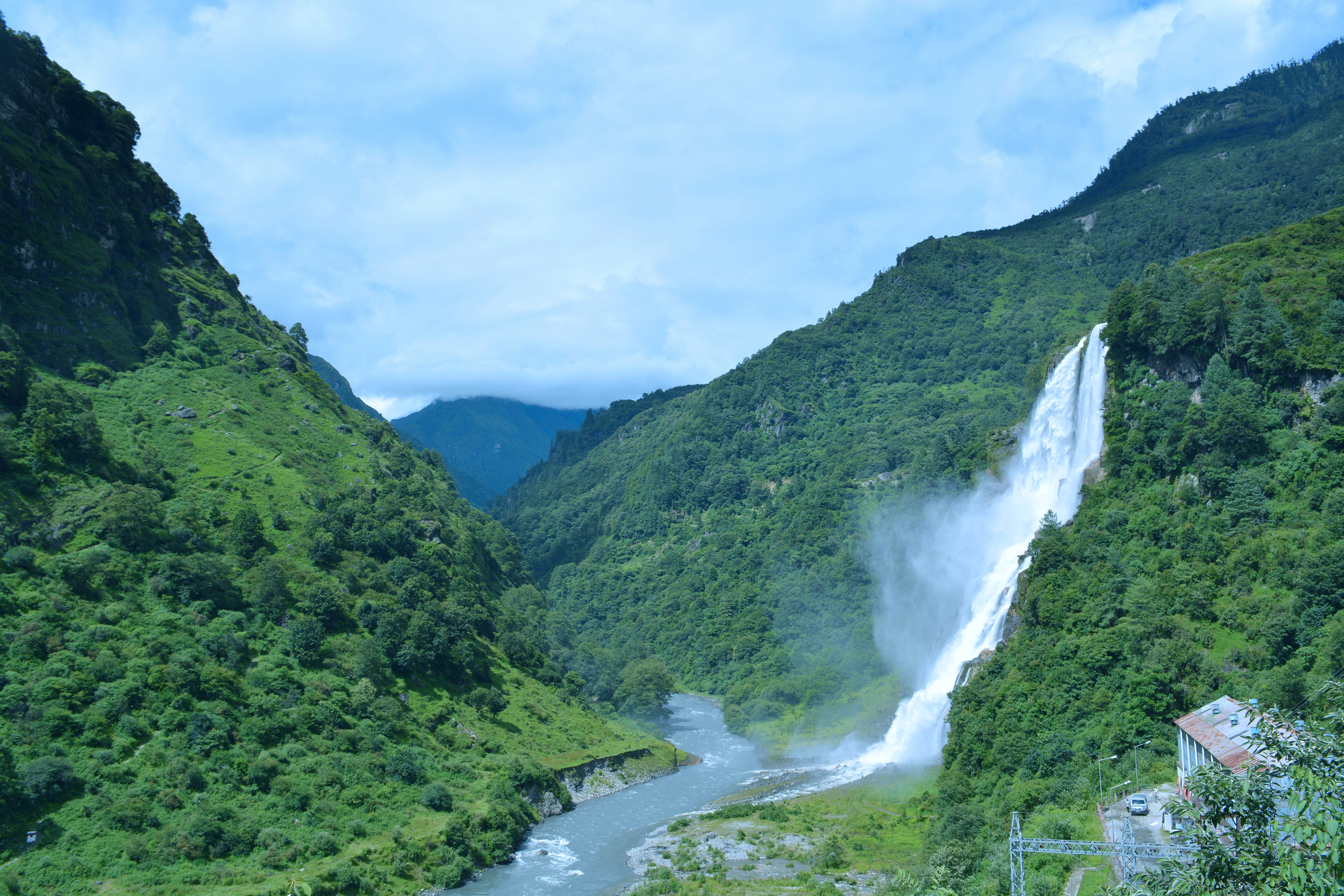
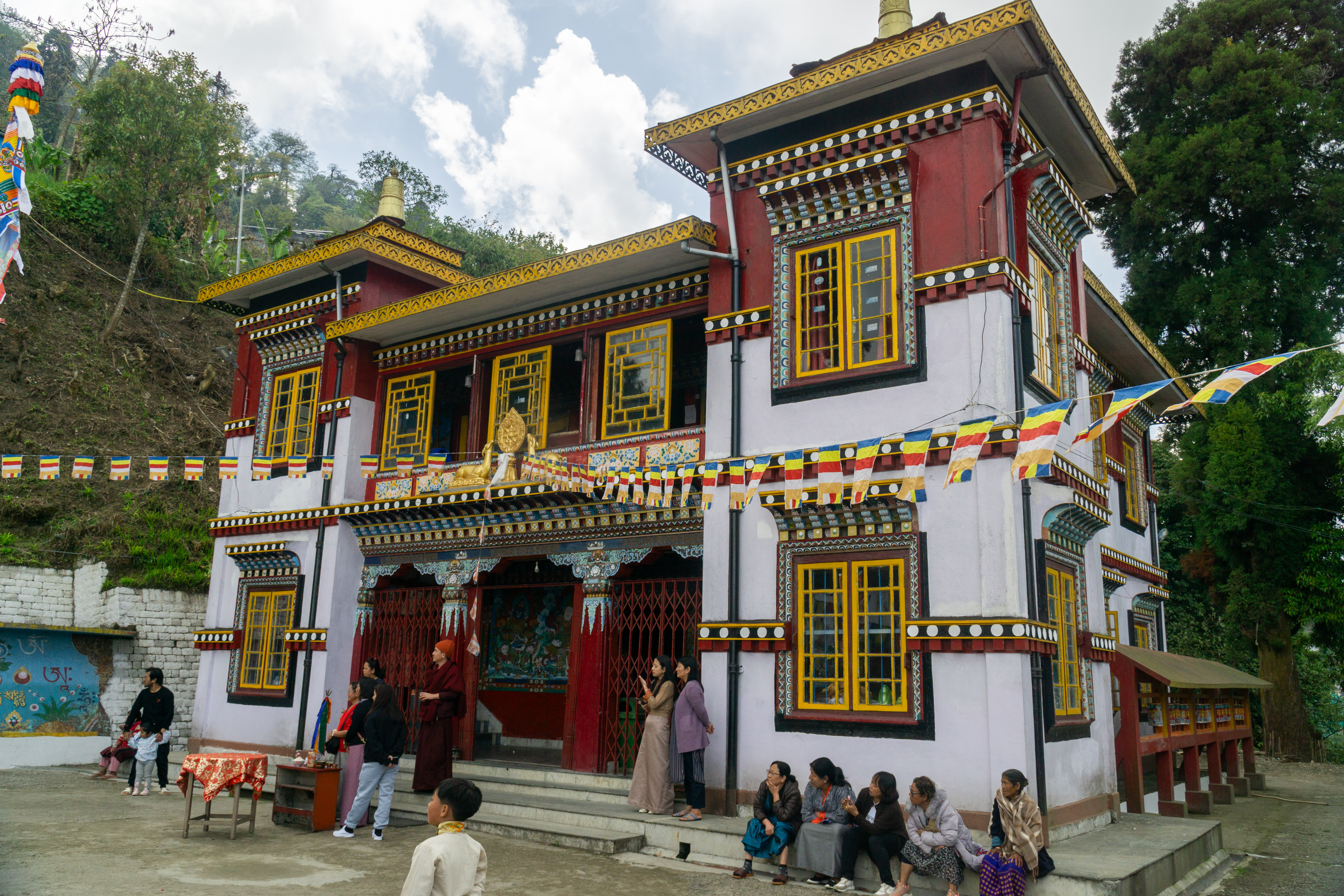
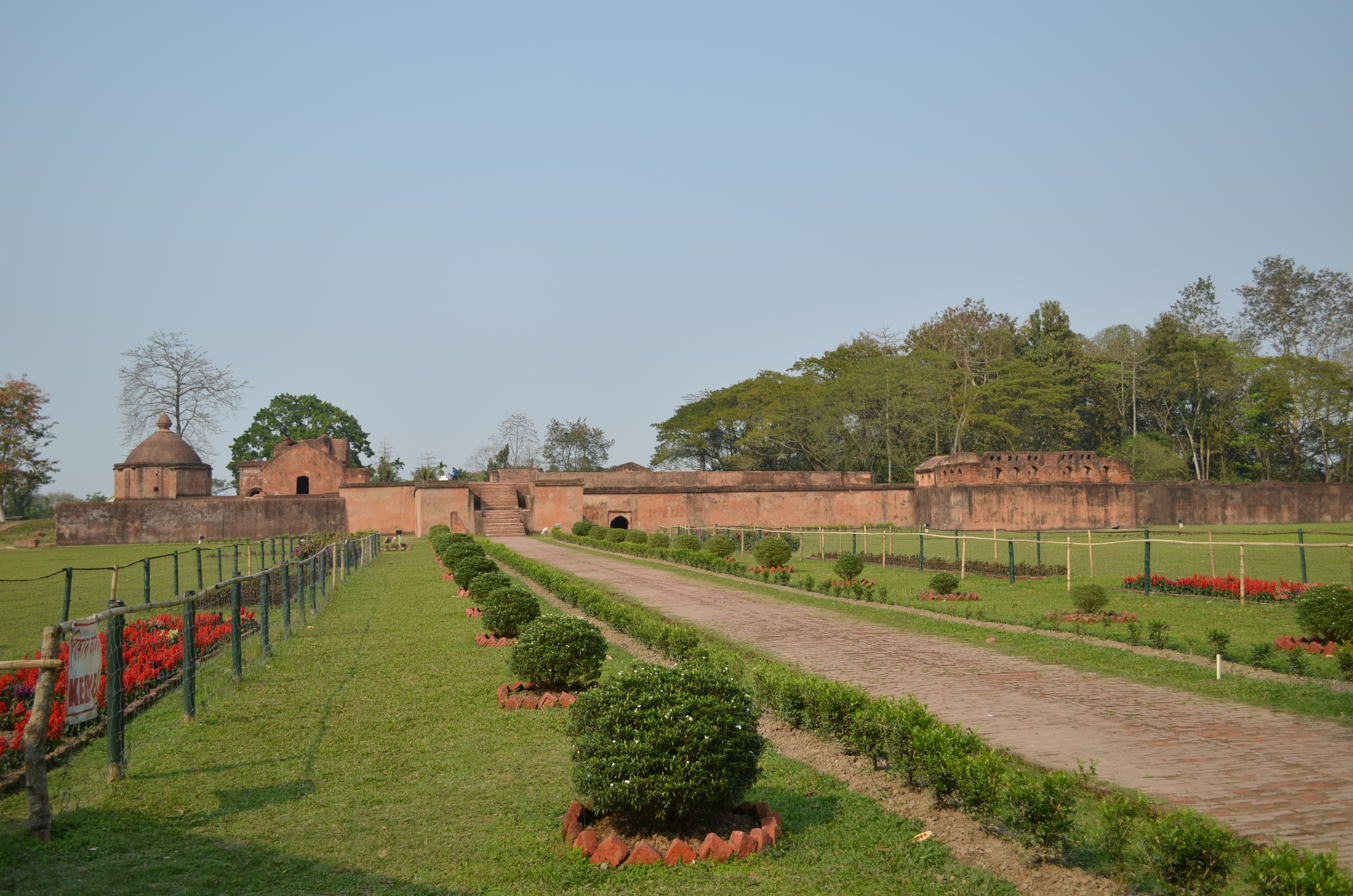
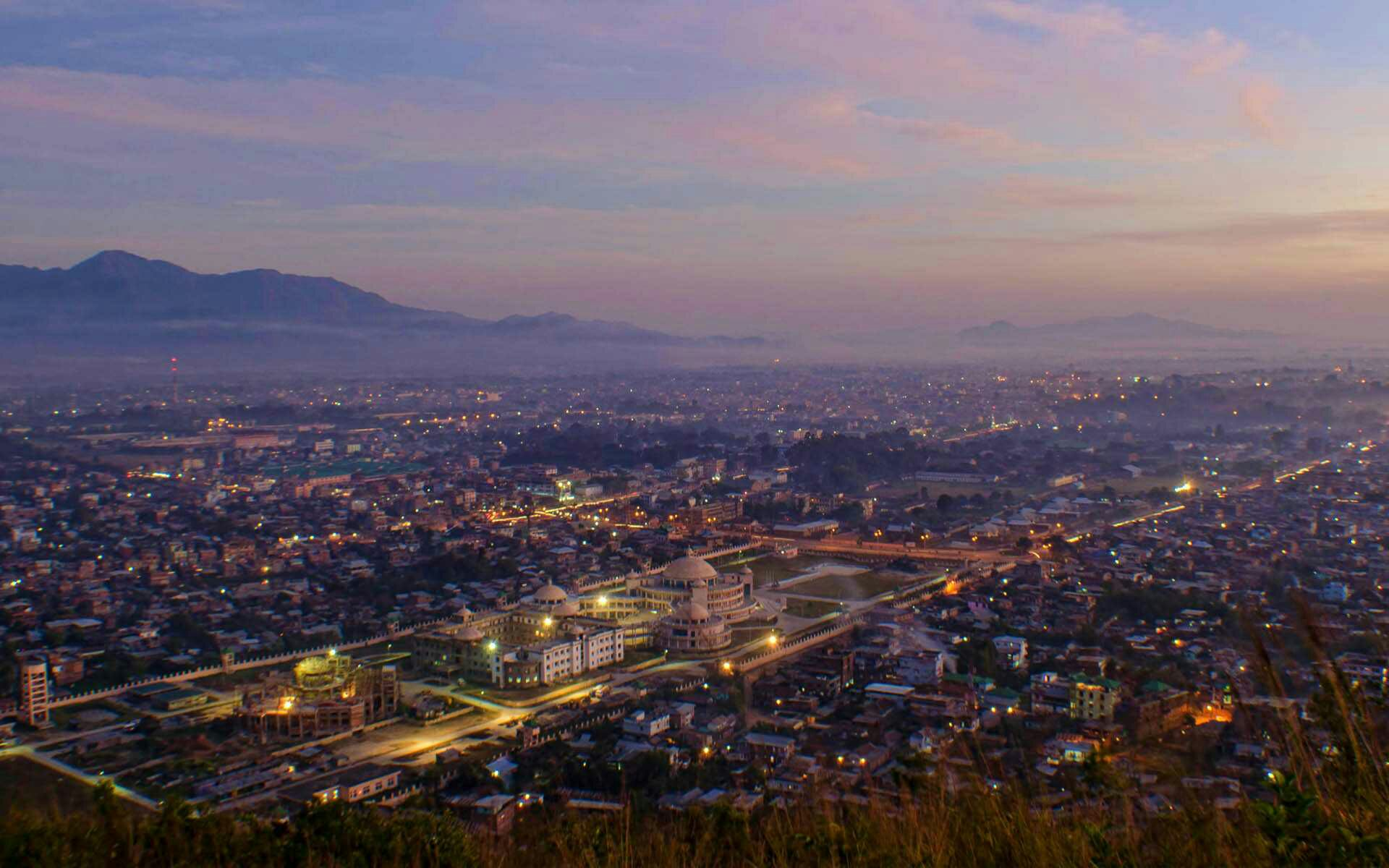
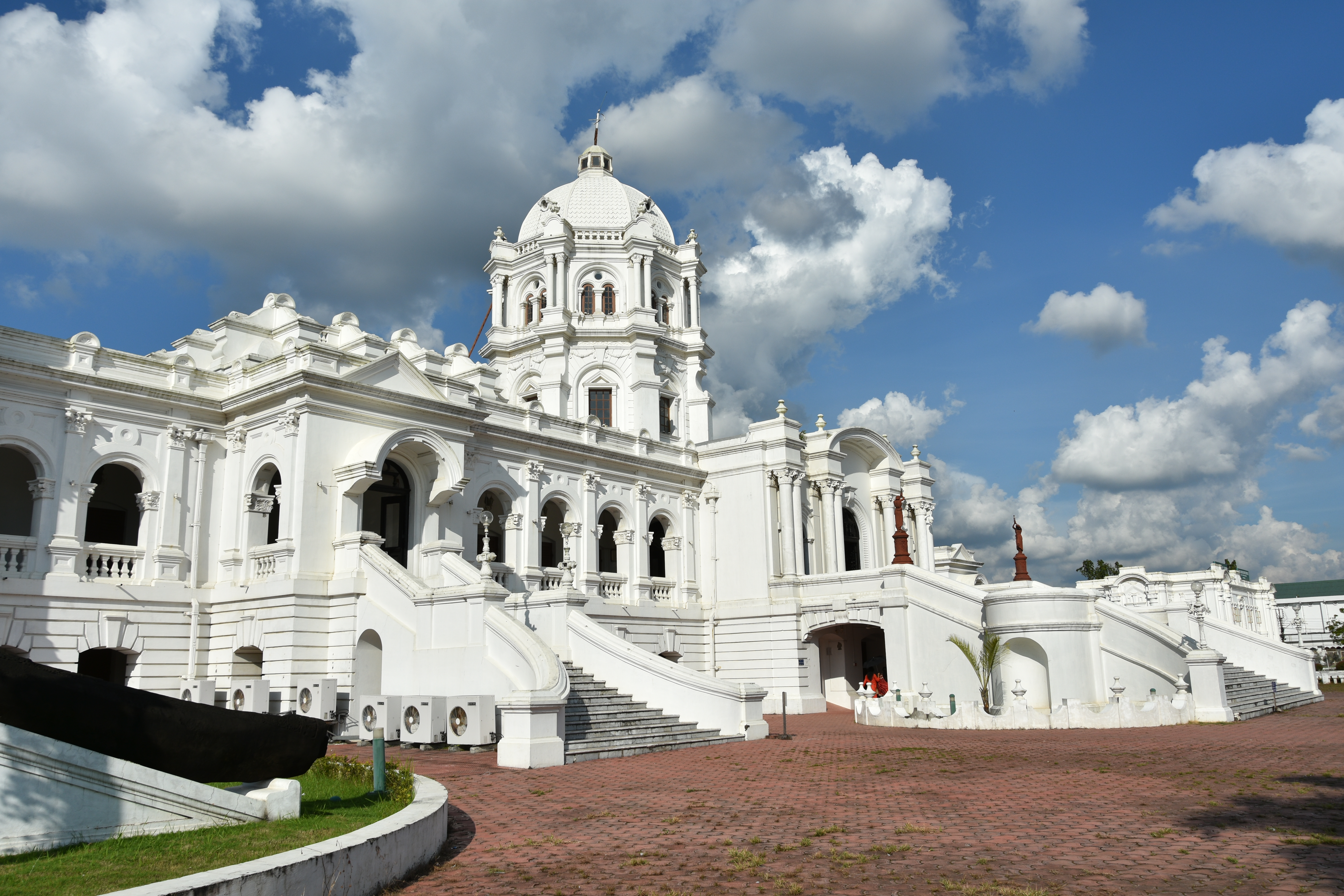
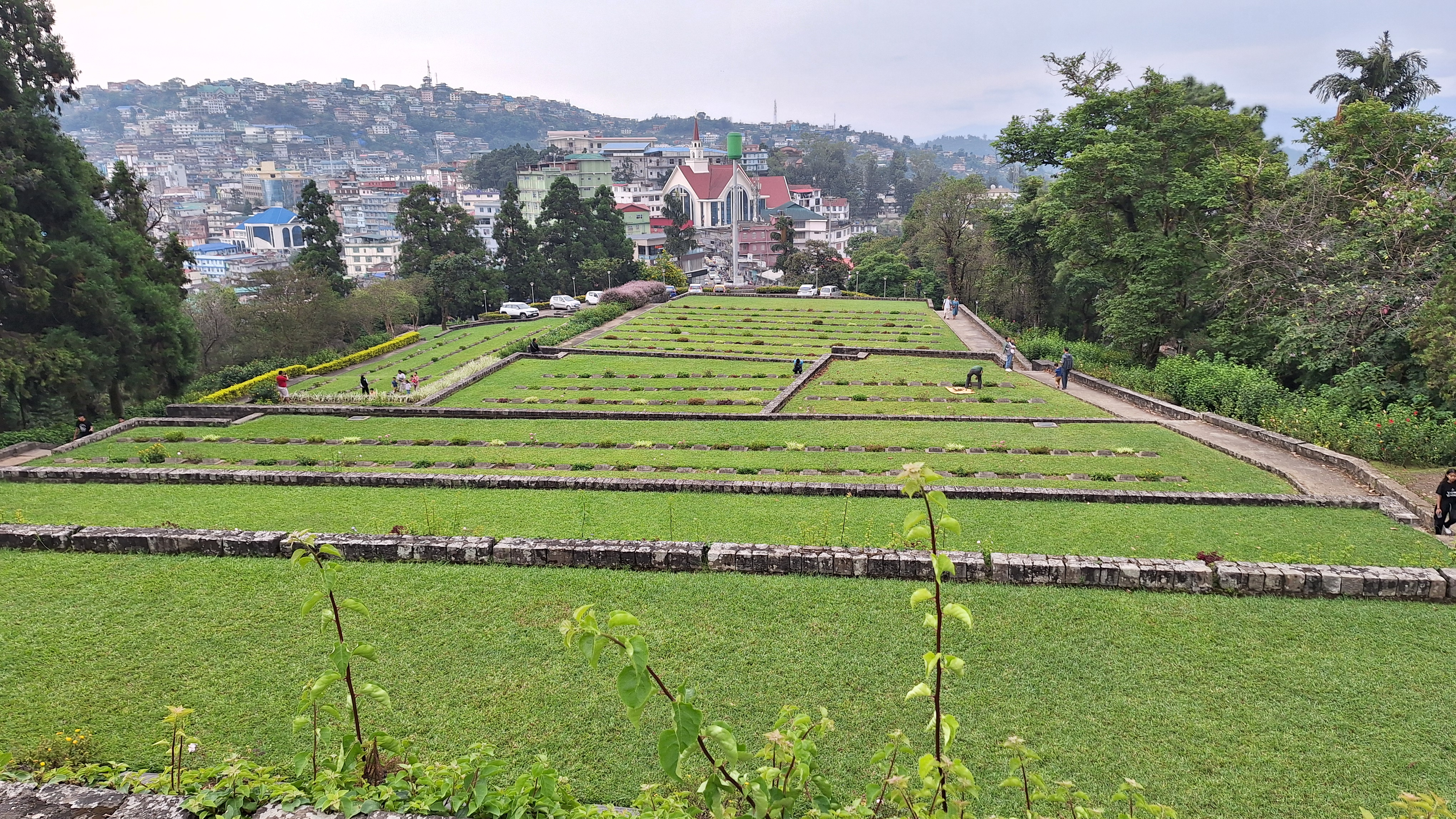
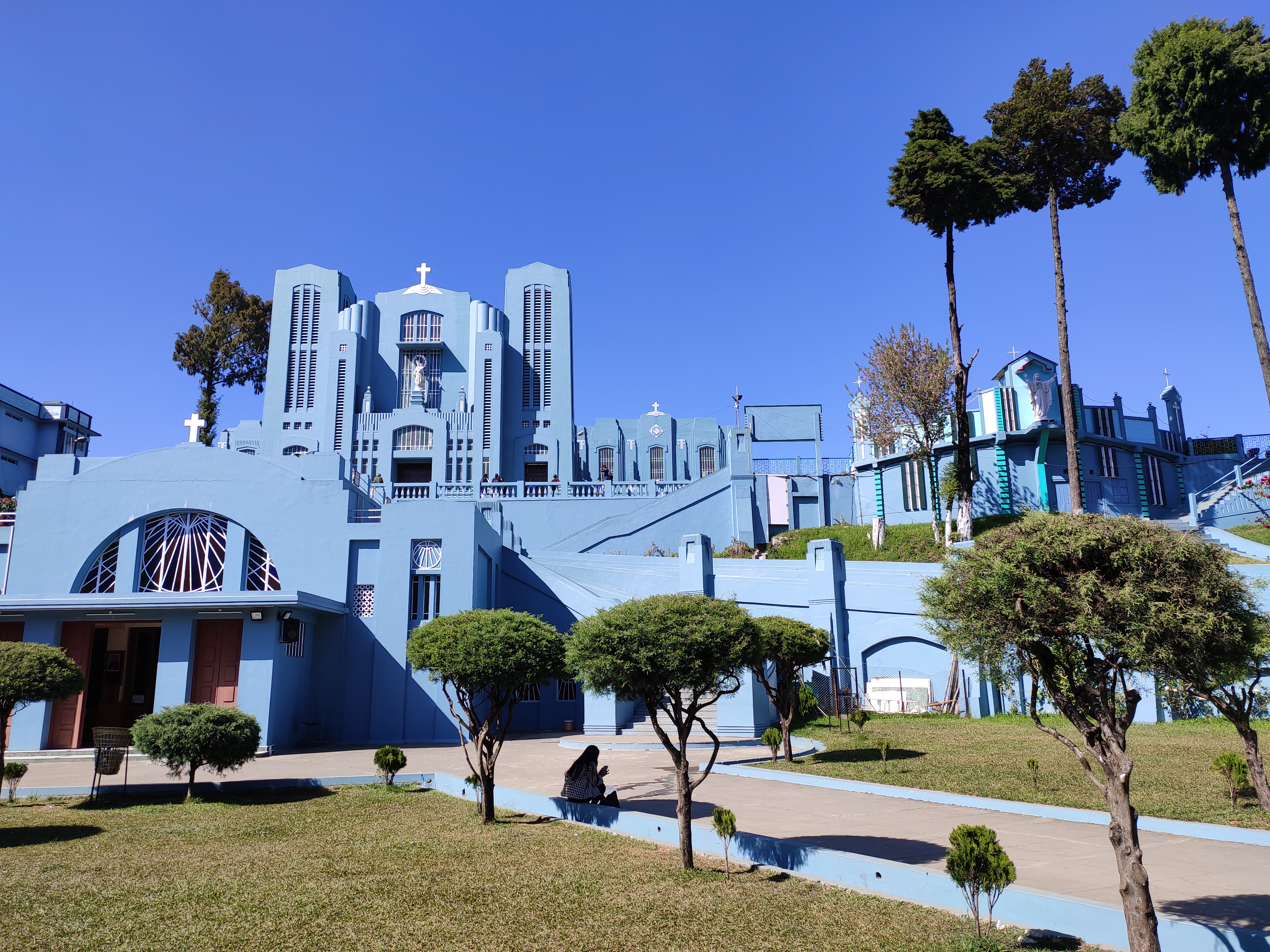
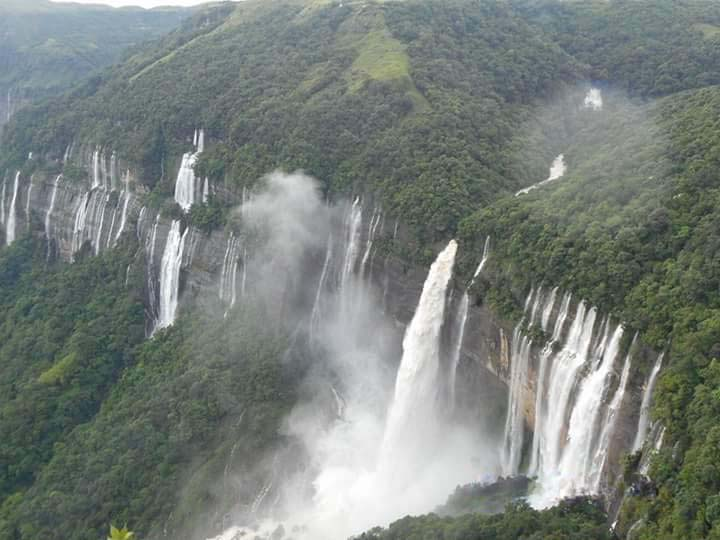
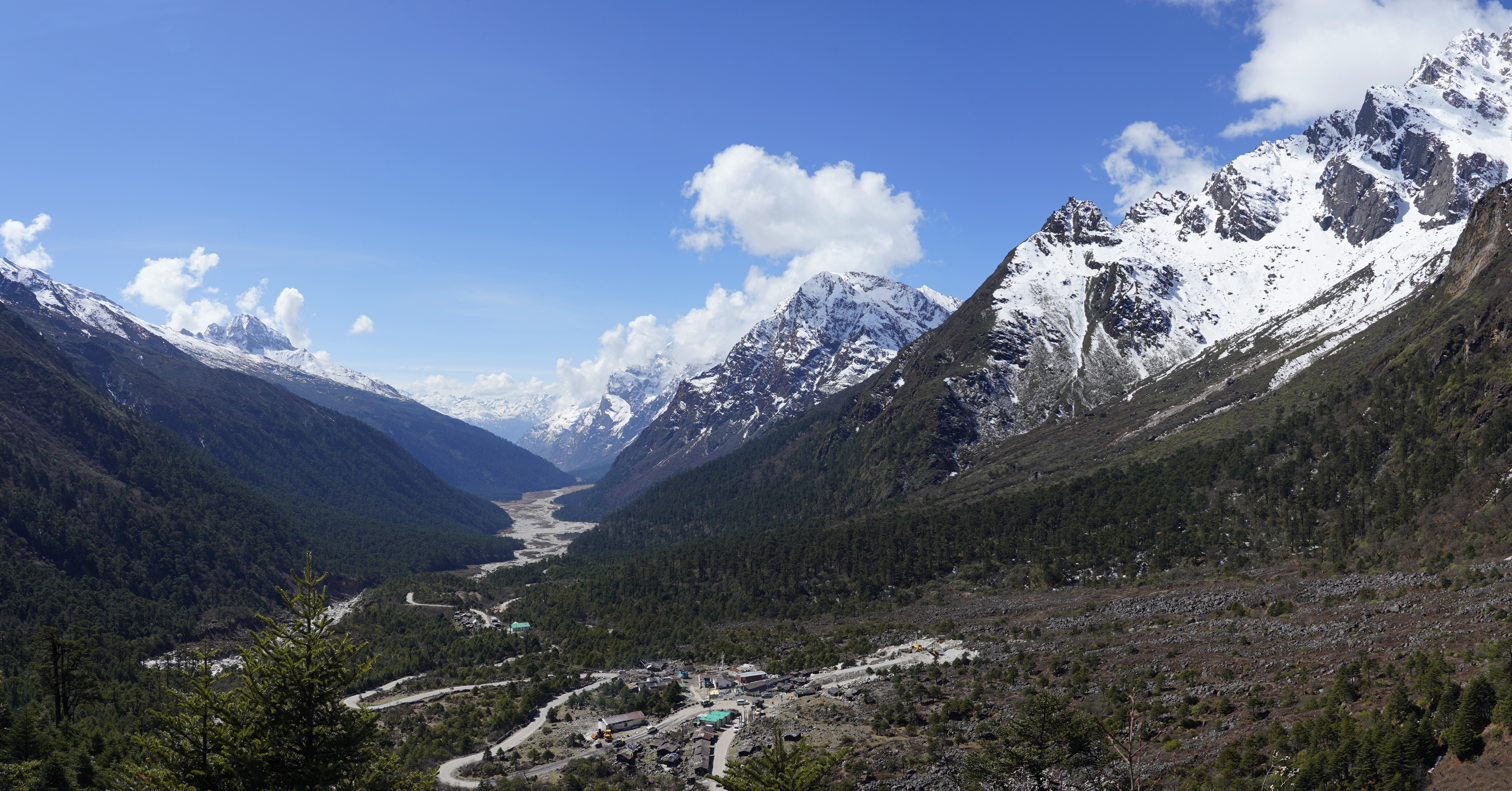
- From top, left to right: Nuranang Falls, Bhutia Busty Monastery, Talatal Ghar, Imphal city, Ujjayanta Palace, Kohima War Cemetery, Mary Help of Christians Cathedral, Nohkalikai Falls and Yumthang Valley

- States in Northeast India

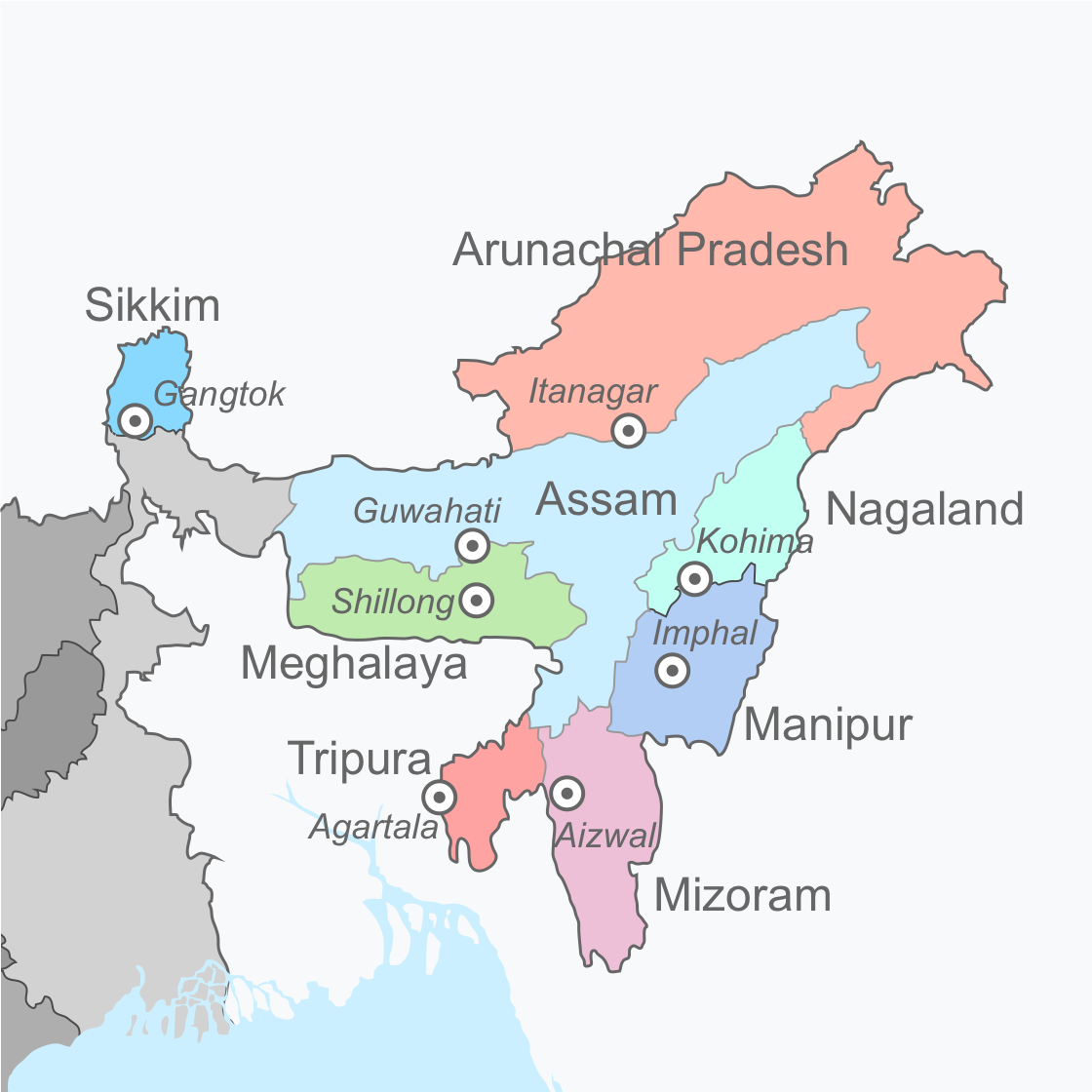
- Coordinates: 26°N 91°E
- Country: India
- States: Arunachal Pradesh; Assam; Manipur; Meghalaya; Mizoram; Nagaland; Tripura; Sikkim
- Largest city: Guwahati
- Major cities (2011 Census of India): Agartala; Imphal; Dimapur; Shillong; Aizawl; Silchar; Dibrugarh; Jorhat; Nagaon

Area
  - Total: 262,184 km^{2} (101,230 sq mi)

Population (2011)
  - Total: 45,772,188
  - Estimate (2022): 51,670,000
  - Density: 173/km^{2} (450/sq mi)
- Time zone: UTC+5:30 (Indian Standard Time)
- Scheduled languages: Assamese; Bengali; Bodo; Meitei (Manipuri); Nepali
- State/Regional official languages: Assamese (of Assam); Bengali (of Tripura and Barak Valley); Bodo (of Bodoland); Kokborok (Tripuri) (of Tripura); Mizo (of Mizoram); Meitei (Manipuri) (of Manipur and Assam; Nepali (of Sikkim); English (of Arunachal Pradesh, Meghalaya and Nagaland); Sikkimese (of Sikkim)

Northeast India, officially the North Eastern Region (NER), is the easternmost region of India representing both a geographic and political administrative division of the country. It comprises eight states: Arunachal Pradesh, Assam, Manipur, Meghalaya, Mizoram, Nagaland, and Tripura (commonly known as the "Seven Sisters"), and the state of Sikkim. Northeast India is one of the most linguistically diverse regions in the world.

The region has India's international border of 5,182 kilometres (3,220 mi) with five neighbouring countries: China to the north, Myanmar to the east, Bangladesh to the southwest, Nepal to the west, and Bhutan to the northwest. (Note: – 1,395 kilometres (867 mi) with China in the north, 1,640 kilometres (1,020 mi) with Myanmar in the east, 1,596 kilometres (992 mi) with Bangladesh in the south-west, 97 kilometres (60 mi) with Nepal in the west, and 455 kilometres (283 mi) with Bhutan in the north-west) It comprises an area of 262,184 square kilometres (101,230 sq mi), almost 8 per cent of that of India and has a population of 45,772,188, almost 4 per cent that of India. The Siliguri Corridor connects the region to other parts of India.

Northeast India has significant mineral resources; India's first oil well was dug at Digboi in Assam in 1865. The region contains one of the world's notable ophiolites.

During the Second World War, the region was the site of the Battle of Imphal and Kohima (1944), in which Japanese and Allied forces fought and both sides sustained thousands of casualties.

The states of North Eastern Region are officially recognised under the North Eastern Council (NEC), constituted in 1971 as the acting agency for the development of the north eastern states. Sikkim became a member of the North Eastern Council in 2002. India's Look-East connectivity projects connect Northeast India to East Asia and ASEAN.

== History ==
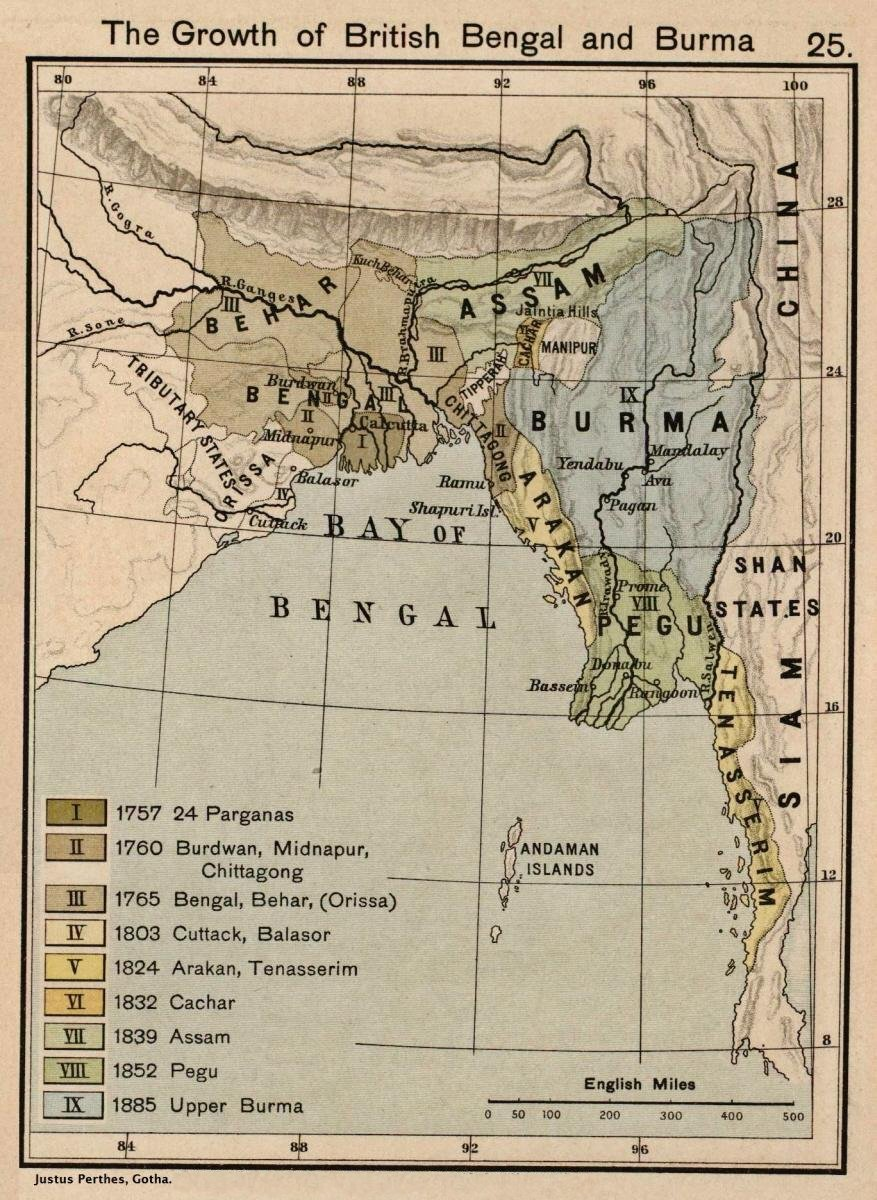
Assam annexation to British India in 1838

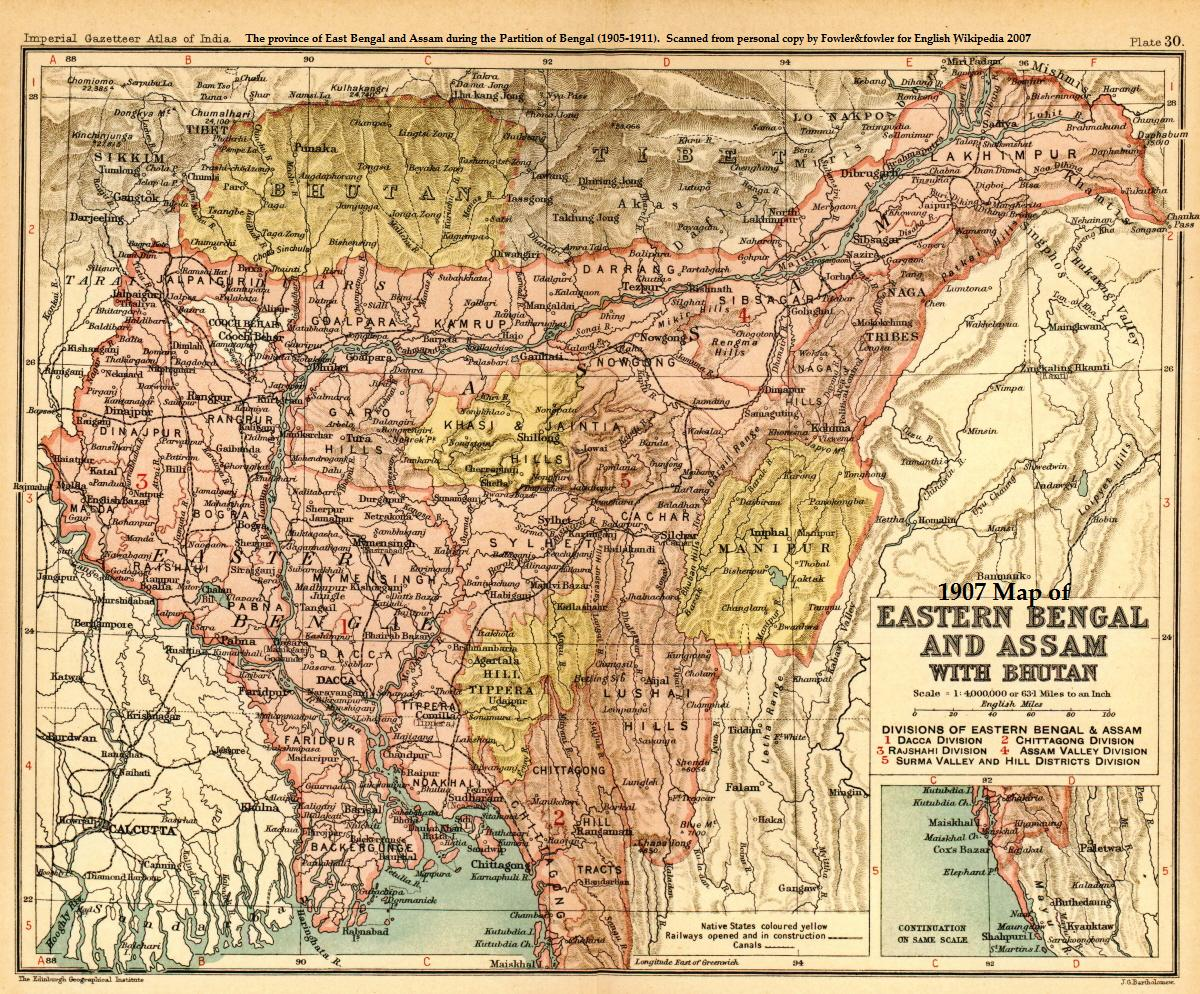
Eastern Bengal and Assam in 1907

The earliest settlers may have been Austroasiatic speakers from Southeast Asia, followed by Tibeto-Burman speakers from China, and by 500 BCE Indo-Aryan speakers from the Gangetic Plains as well as Kra–Dai speakers from southern Yunnan and Shan State. Due to the biodiversity and crop diversity of the region, archaeological researchers believe that early settlers of Northeast India had domesticated several important plants. Historians believe that the 100 BCE writings of Chinese explorer Zhang Qian indicate an early trade route via Northeast India. The Periplus of the Erythraean Sea mentions a people called Sêsatai in the region, who produced malabathron (cinnamon-like aromatic leaves, dried and used as a flavouring agent), that was valued in the ancient world. Ptolemy's Geographia (2nd century CE) calls the region Kirrhadia, apparently after the Kirata population.

In the early historical period (most of the first millennium CE), Kamarupa straddled most of present-day Northeast India. Xuanzang, a travelling Chinese Buddhist monk, visited Kamarupa in the 7th century CE. He described the people as "short in stature and black-looking", whose speech differed a little from mid-India and who were of simple but violent disposition. He wrote that the people in Kamarupa knew of Sichuan, which lay to the kingdom's east beyond a treacherous mountain.

The northeastern states were established during the British Raj of the 19th and early 20th centuries, when they became relatively isolated from traditional trading partners such as Bhutan and Myanmar. Many of the peoples in present-day Mizoram, Meghalaya and Nagaland converted to Christianity under the influence of British (Welsh) missionaries.

=== Formation of North Eastern states ===
Since the Moamoria disturbances, the Ahom dynasty was on the decline. The British appeared on the scene in the guise of saviours. In the early 19th century, both the Ahom and the Manipur kingdoms fell to a Burmese invasion. The ensuing First Anglo-Burmese War resulted in the entire region coming under British control. In the colonial period (1826–1947), North East India was made a part of Bengal Province from 1839 to 1873, after which Colonial Assam became its own province, but which included Sylhet.

After Indian Independence from British Rule in 1947, the Northeastern region of British India consisted of Assam and the princely states of Tripura Kingdom and Manipur Kingdom. Subsequently, Manipur and Tripura were made Union Territories of India in 1956 and in 1972 attained fully-fledged statehood. Later, Nagaland attained statehood in 1963, Meghalaya in 1972. Arunachal Pradesh and Mizoram became full-fledged states on 20 February 1987, being carved out of the large territory of Assam. Sikkim was integrated as the eighth North Eastern Council state in 2002.

The city of Shillong served as the capital of the Assam province created during British Rule. It remained the capital of undivided Assam until the formation of the state of Meghalaya in 1972. The capital of Assam was shifted to Dispur, a part of Guwahati, and Shillong was designated as the capital of Meghalaya.

State	Historic name	Capital(s)	Statehood
Arunachal Pradesh	North-East Frontier Agency	Itanagar	1987 (earlier a Union Territory of India, constituted in 1971)
Assam	Kamarupa	Shillong (till 1969), Dispur	1947
Manipur	Kangleipak	Imphal	1971 (earlier a Union Territory of India, constituted in 1956)
Meghalaya	Khasi hills, Jaintia hills and Garo hills	Shillong	1971
Tripura	Tipperah	Agartala	1971 (earlier a Union Territory of India, constituted in 1956)
Mizoram	Lushai Hills	Aizawl	1987 (earlier a Union Territory of India, constituted in 1971)
Nagaland	Naga Hills District	Kohima	1963
Sikkim	Sukhim	Gangtok	1975

=== World War II ===
Initially, the Japanese had invaded British territories in Southeast Asia, including Burma (now Myanmar), with the intention of creating a fortified perimeter around Japan. The British had neglected the defence of Burma, and by early 1942, the Japanese had captured Rangoon and pushed Allied forces back towards India in a prolonged retreat.

In response to the Japanese advance, the British formed the South East Asia Command (SEAC) under Admiral Lord Louis Mountbatten in November 1943. The command reorganised the war effort in the region and continued operations despite logistical challenges, such as during the monsoon season.

The Japanese launched an offensive in March 1944 aimed at capturing Imphal and Kohima, key locations in northeast India. Capturing these areas would have allowed the Japanese to disrupt Allied supply lines to China and launch air attacks against India.

However, the Allied forces, under the leadership of Field Marshal William Slim, held their positions. They used tactics including the creation of defensive "boxes" and the use of jungle warfare techniques. Despite being surrounded, the defenders at Kohima held out until reinforcements arrived.

The battles of Imphal and Kohima ended in a Japanese defeat. They suffered heavy casualties and retreated, a turning point in the Burma Campaign. The Allied victory was followed by offensives that cleared Japanese forces from Burma and led to the re-conquest of the region.

=== Sino-Indian War (1962) ===
Arunachal Pradesh, a state in the Northeastern tip of India, is claimed by China as South Tibet. Sino-Indian relations degraded, resulting in the Sino-Indian War of 1962. The cause of the escalation into war is still disputed by both Chinese and Indian sources. During the war in 1962, the PRC (China) captured much of the NEFA (North-East Frontier Agency) created by India in 1954. On 21 November 1962, China declared a unilateral ceasefire, and withdrew its troops 20 kilometres (12 mi) behind the McMahon Line. China returned Indian prisoners of war in 1963.

=== Seven Sister States ===
Seven Sister States

The Seven Sister States is a term for the contiguous states of Arunachal Pradesh, Assam, Meghalaya, Manipur, Mizoram, Nagaland and Tripura prior to inclusion of the state of Sikkim into the North Eastern Region of India. The sobriquet 'Land of the Seven Sisters' was coined to coincide with the inauguration of the new states in January 1972 by Jyoti Prasad Saikia, a journalist, author and bureaucrat from Assam, in the course of a radio talk show in Tripura. He later compiled a book on the interdependence and commonness of the Seven Sister States. The nickname became established largely through this book.

== Geography ==
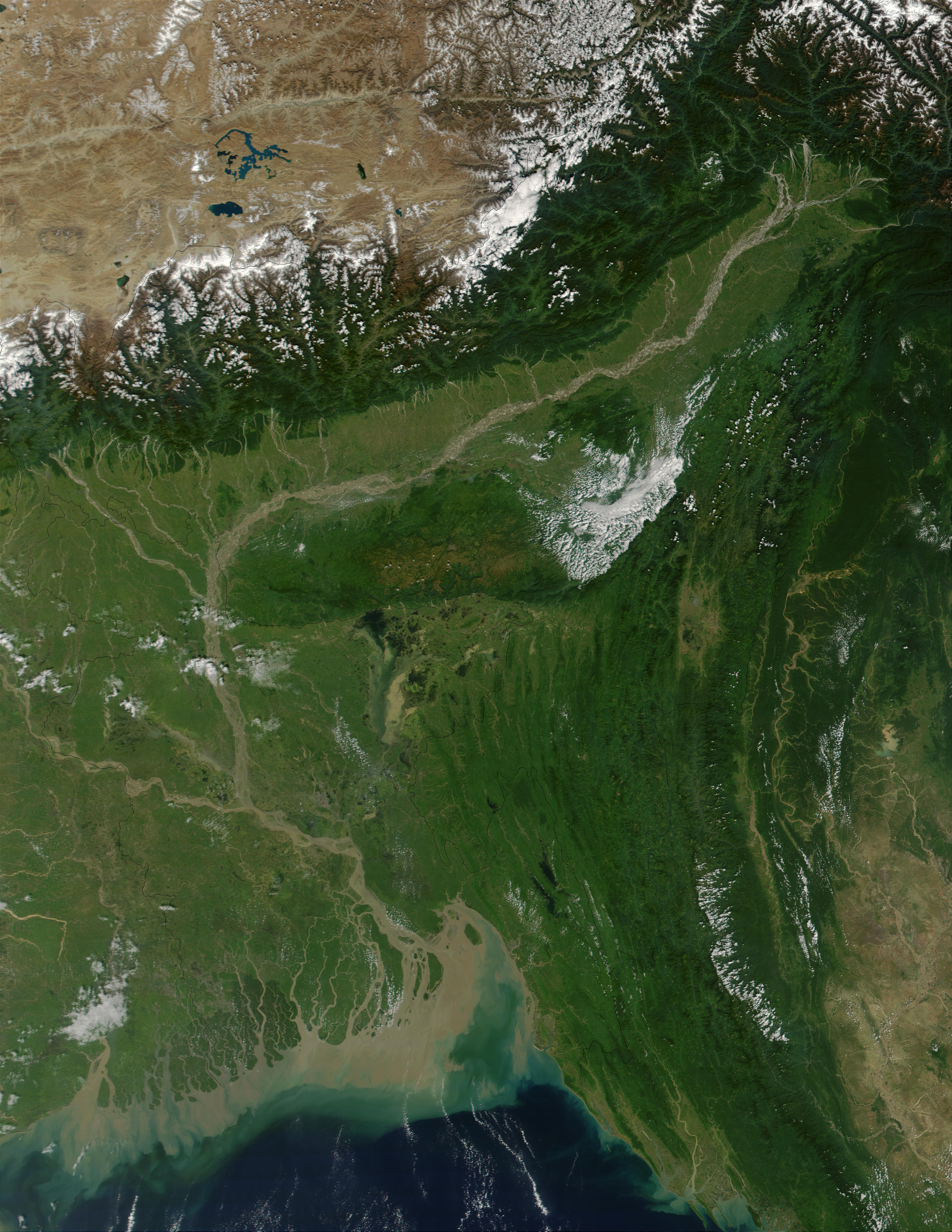
Brahmaputra Valley and Eastern Himalaya in Northeast India

The Northeast region can be physiographically categorised into the Eastern Himalaya, the Patkai and the Brahmaputra and the Barak valley plains. Northeast India (at the confluence of Indo-Malayan, Indo-Chinese, and Indian biogeographical realms) has a predominantly humid sub-tropical climate with hot, humid summers, severe monsoons, and mild winters. Along with the west coast of India, this region has some of the Indian subcontinent's last remaining rainforests, which support diverse flora and fauna and several crop species. Reserves of petroleum and natural gas in the region are estimated to constitute a fifth of India's total potential.

The region is covered by the Brahmaputra-Barak river systems and their tributaries. Geographically, apart from the Brahmaputra, Barak and Imphal valleys and some flatlands in between the hills of Meghalaya and Tripura, the remaining two-thirds of the area is hilly terrain interspersed with valleys and plains; the altitude varies from almost sea-level to over 7,000 metres (23,000 ft) above MSL. The region's high rainfall, averaging around 10,000 millimetres (390 in) and above creates problems of the ecosystem, high seismic activity, and floods. The states of Arunachal Pradesh and Sikkim have a montane climate with cold, snowy winters and mild summers.

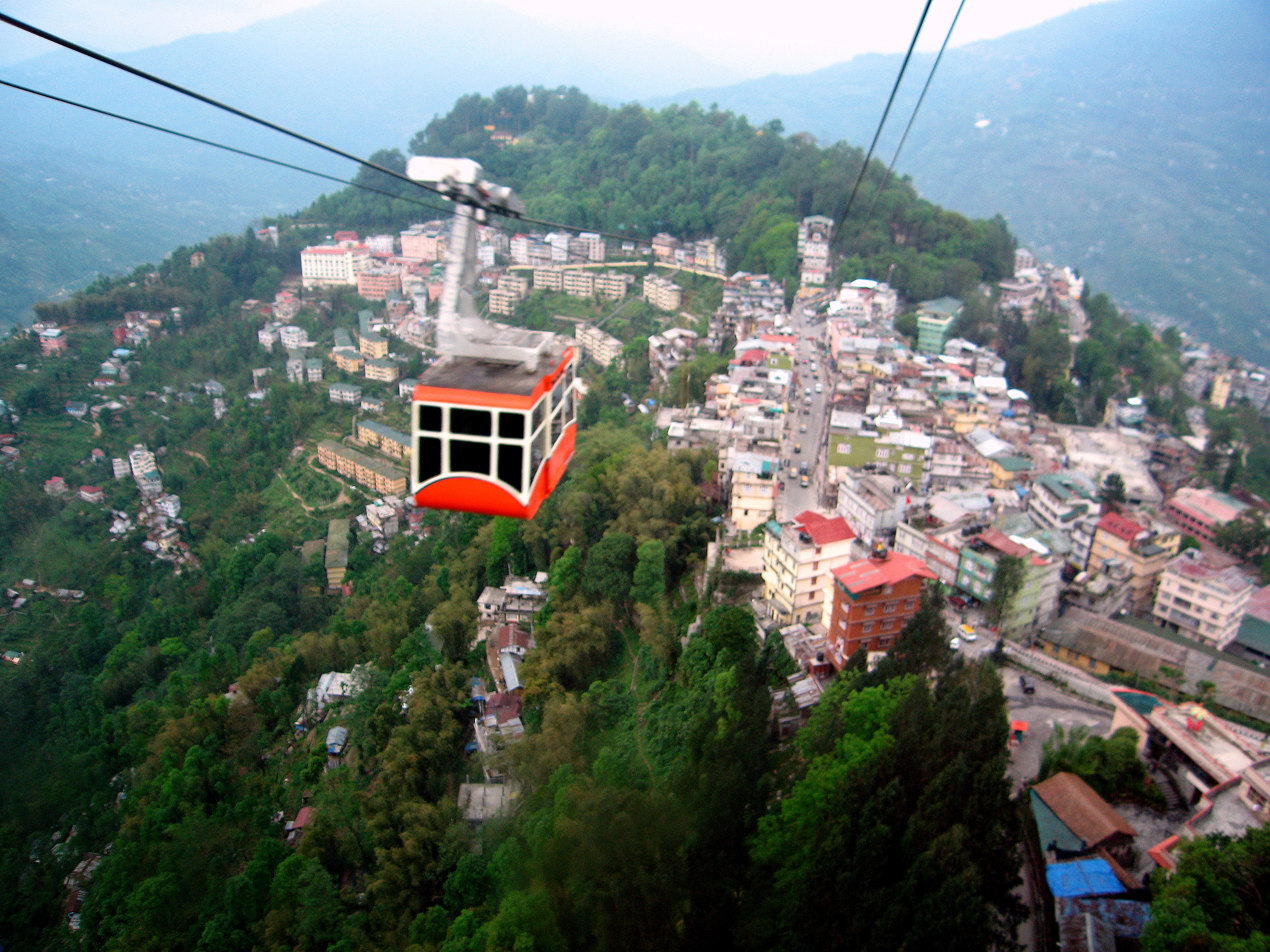
Ropeway, Gangtok

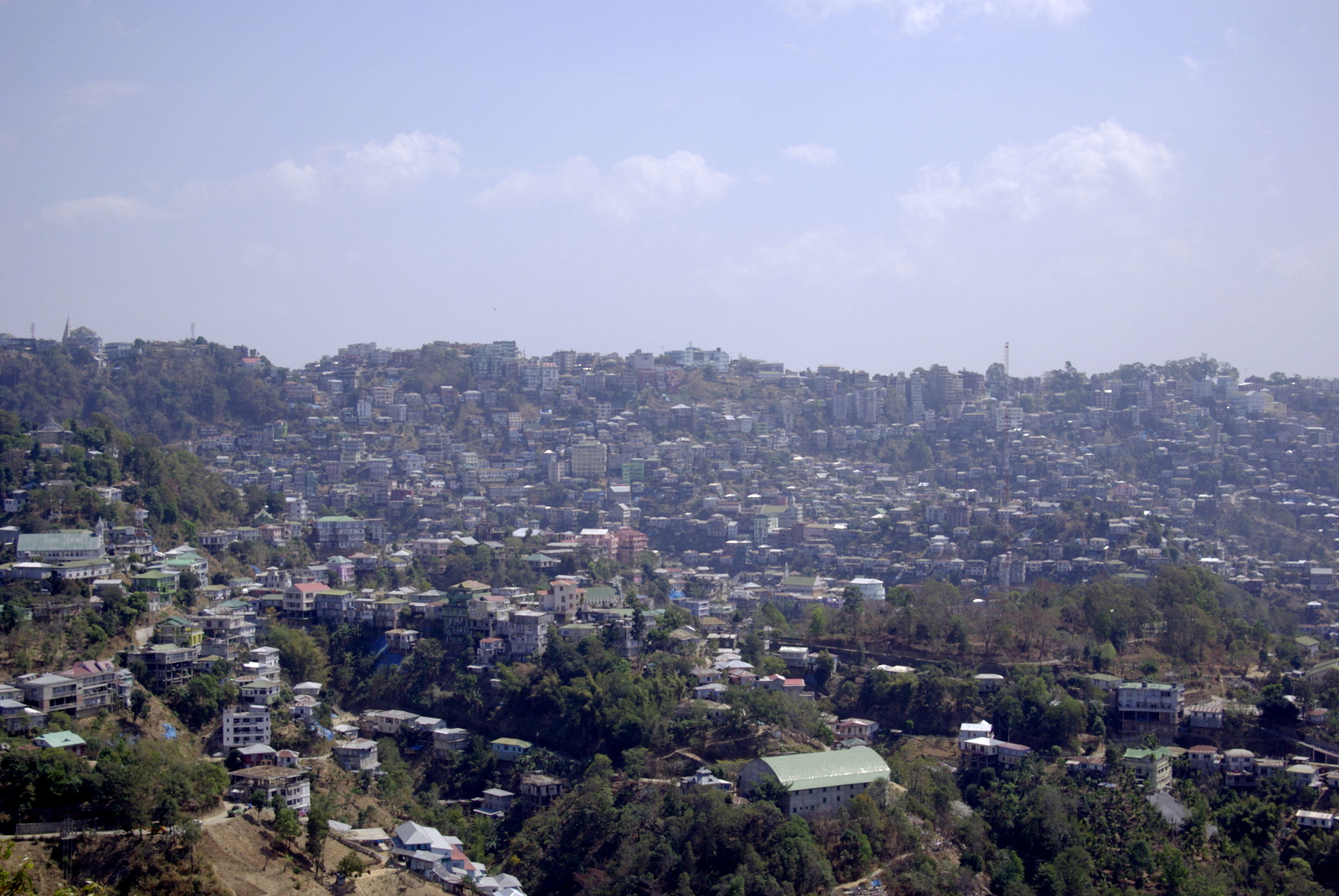
Aizawl, Mizoram

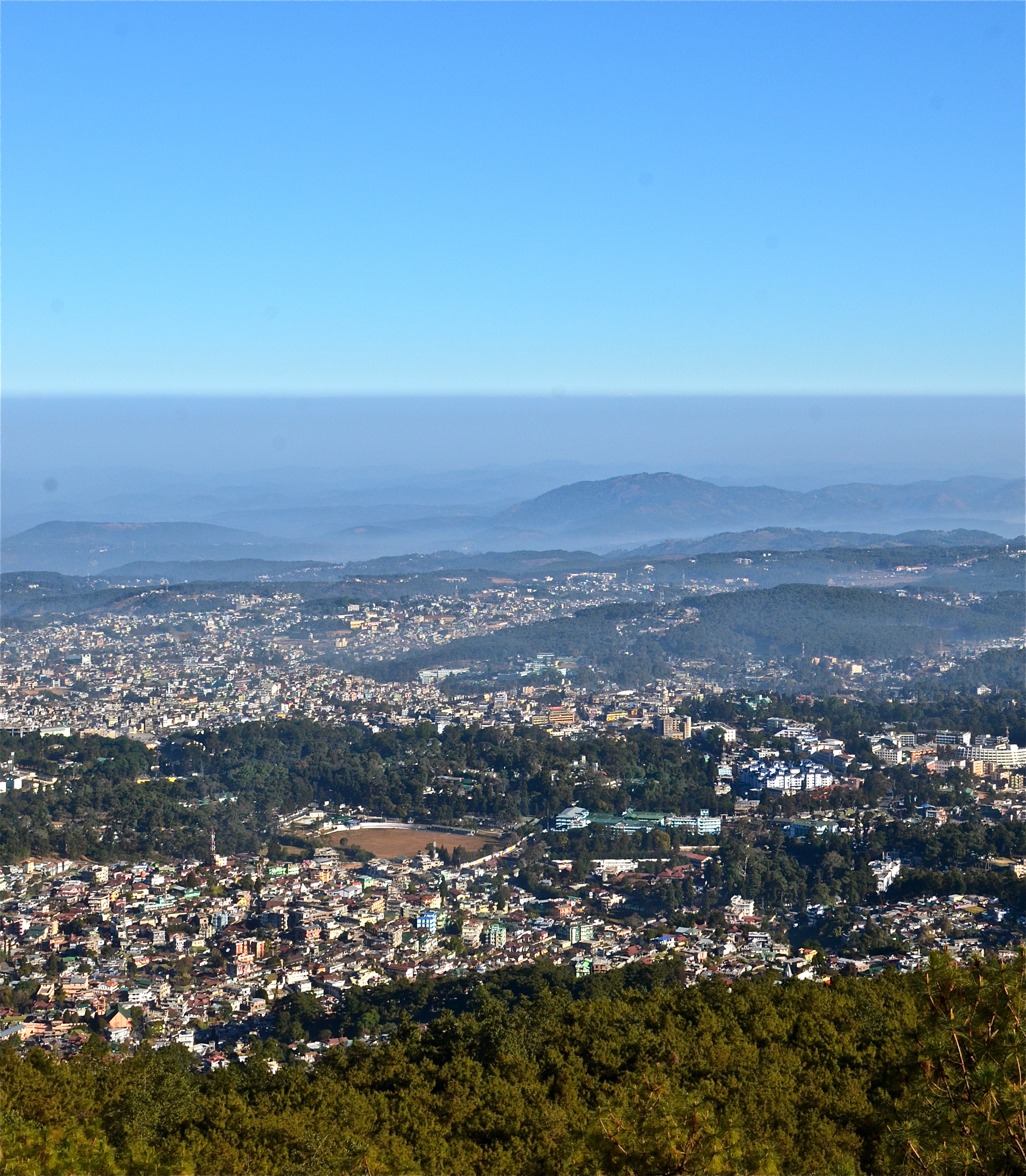
Aerial view of Shillong

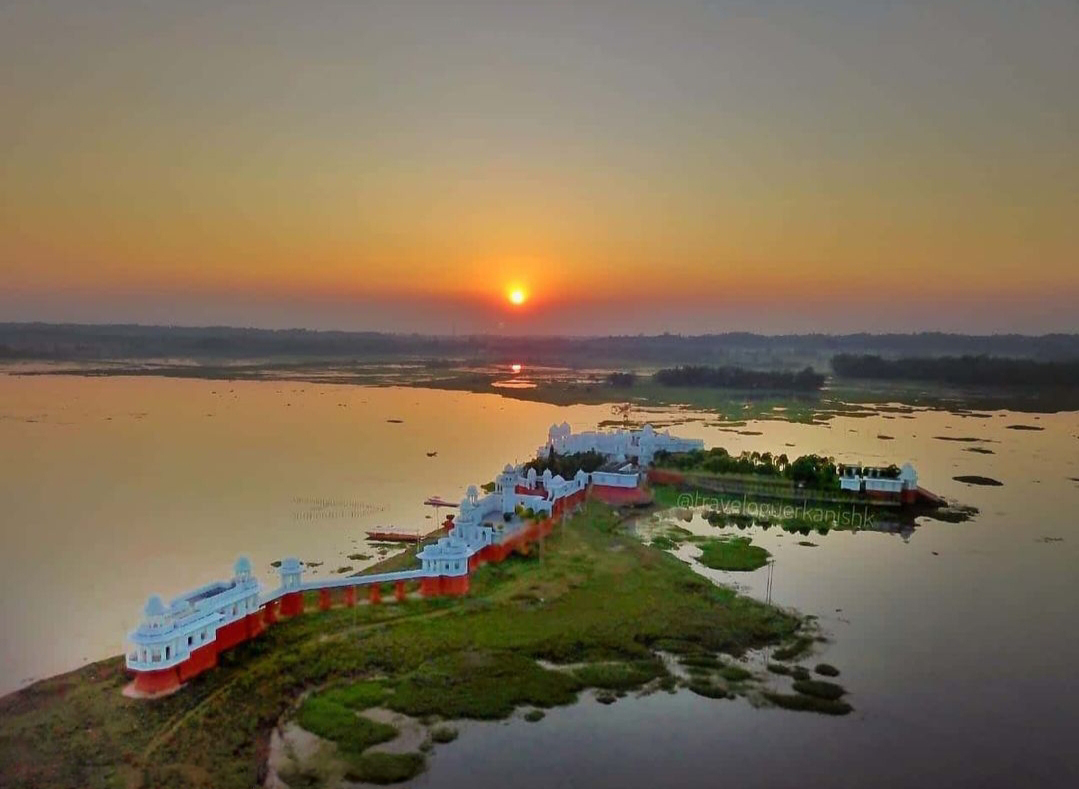
Neer Mahal of Tripura

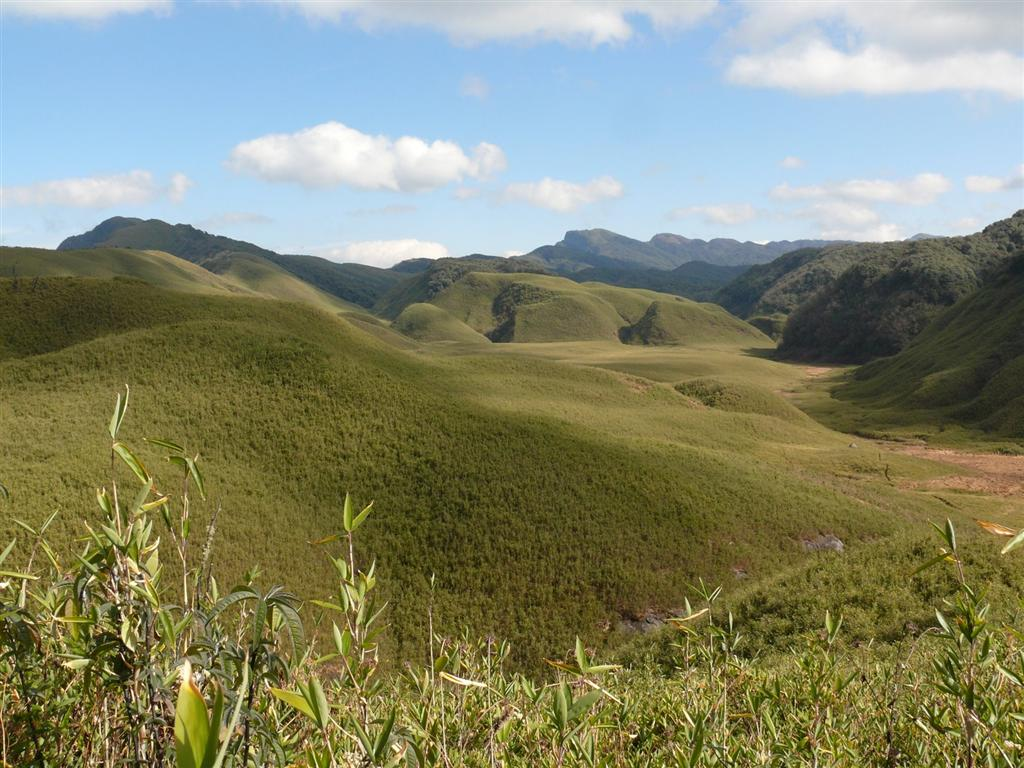
Dzüko Valley (borders of Nagaland and Manipur)

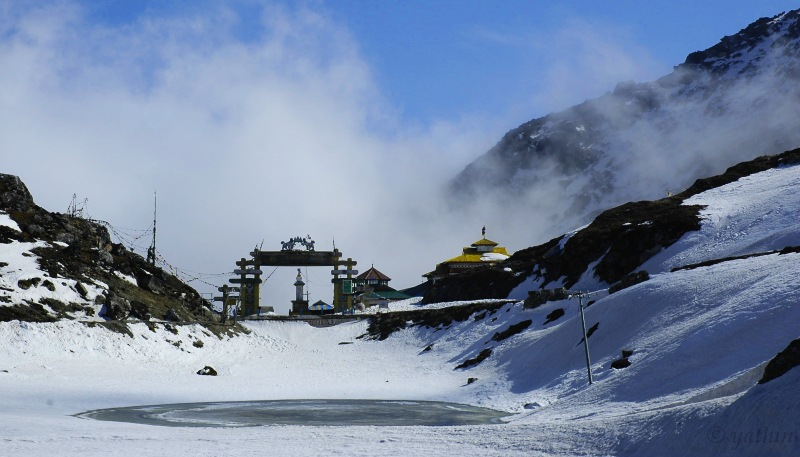
Sela Pass, Tawang (Arunachal Pradesh)

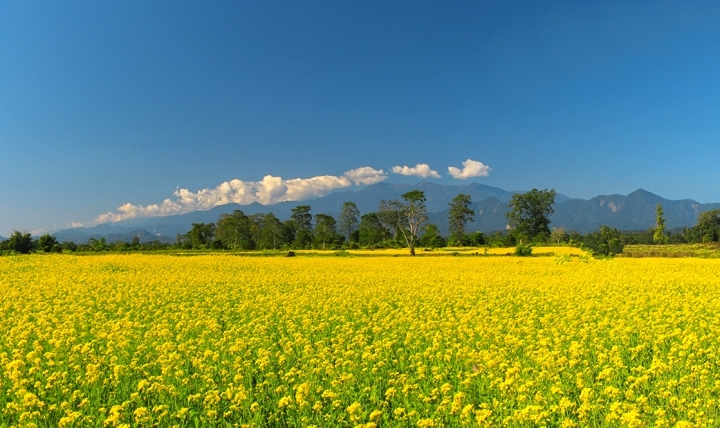
Bhalukpong, Arunachal Pradesh

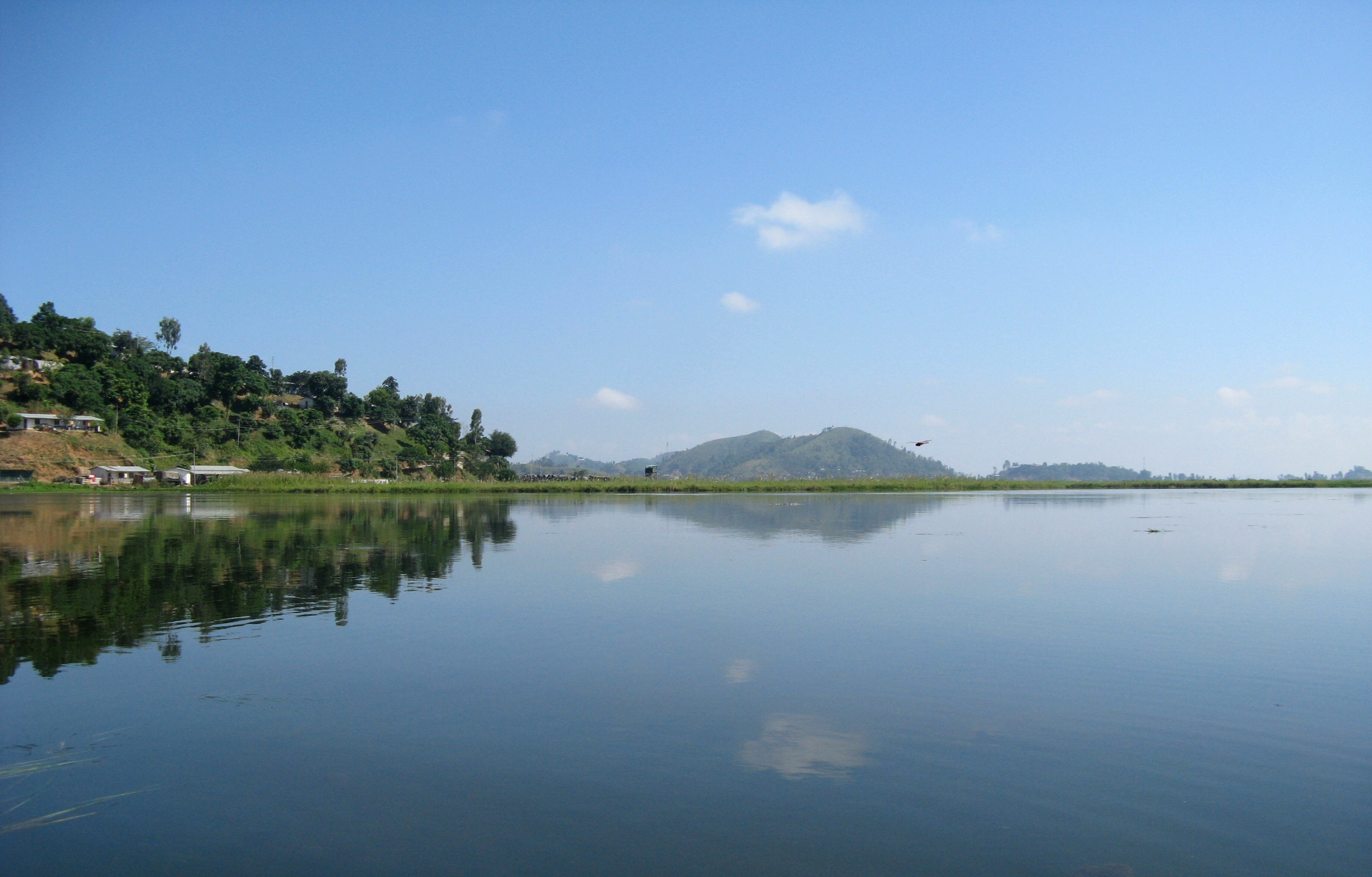
Loktak lake, Manipur

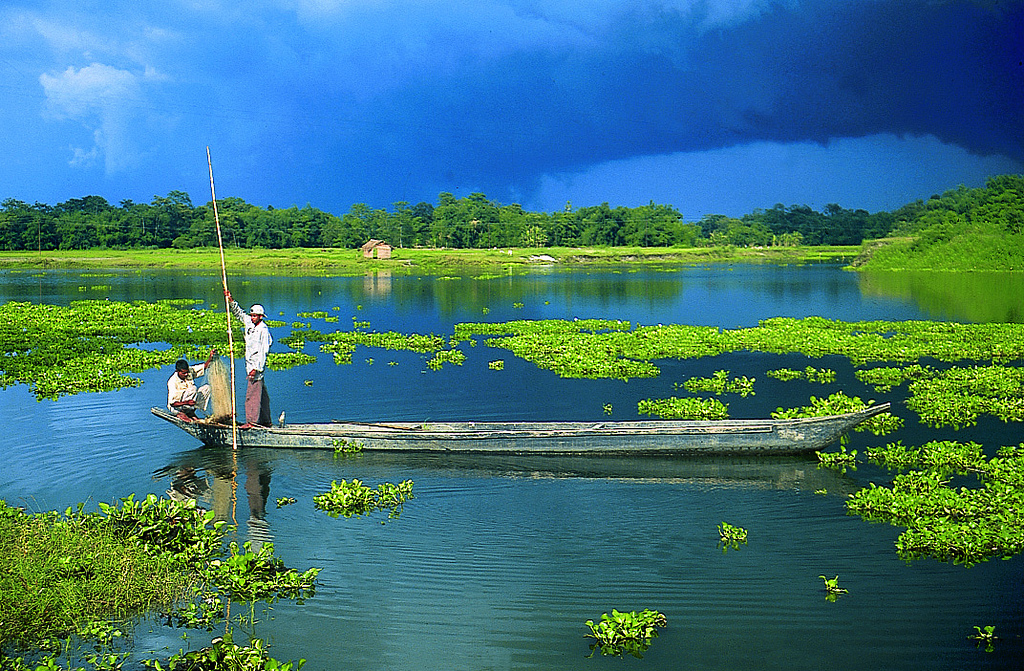
Majuli Island, Assam

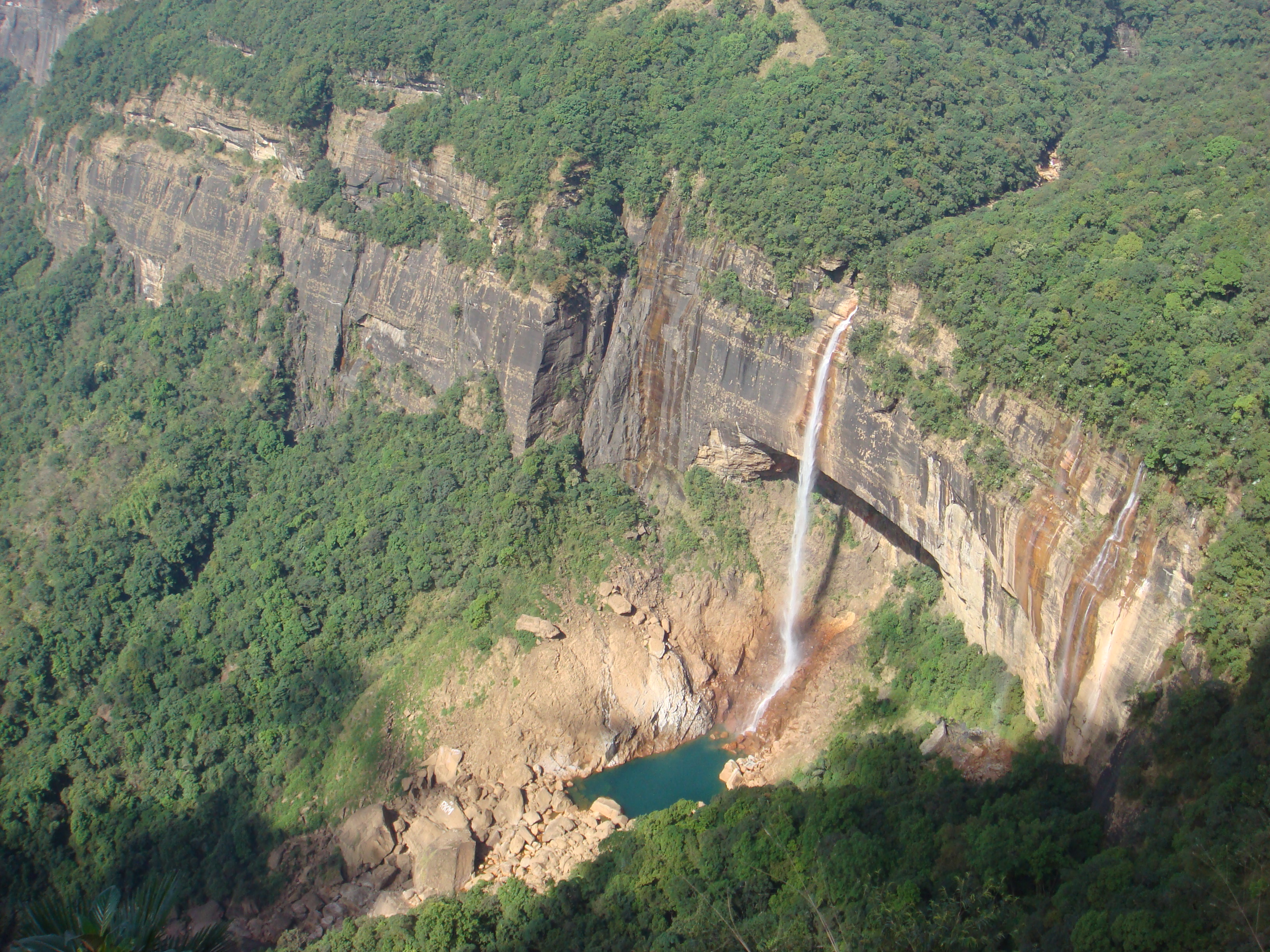
Nohkalikai Falls, Cherrapunji, Meghalaya

=== Topography ===
==== Highest peaks ====
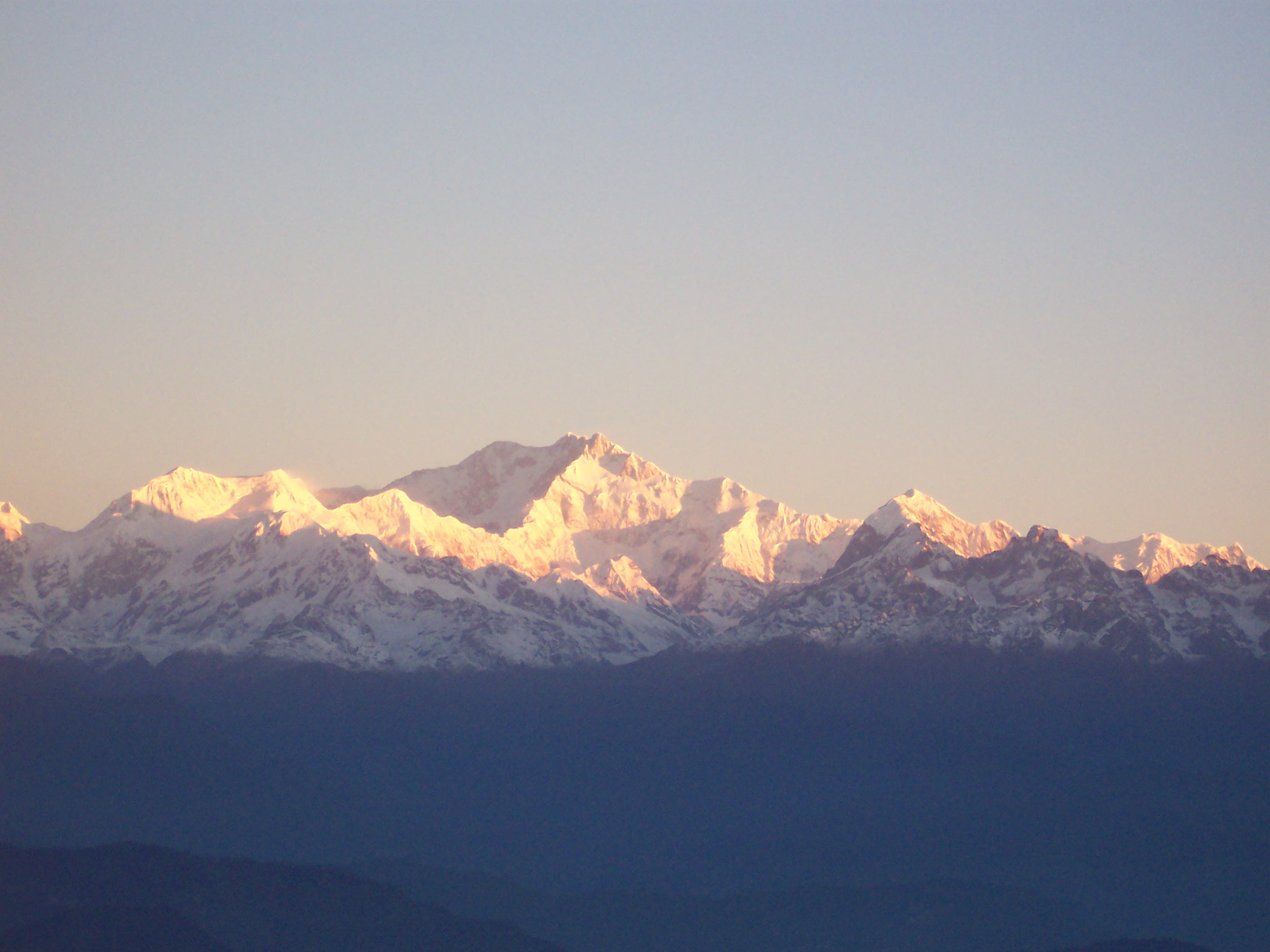
Mt. Kanchenjunga, Sikkim

Kangchenjunga, the third highest mountain peak in the world rising to an altitude of 8,586 m (28,169 ft), lies in between the state Sikkim and adjacent country Nepal.

Mountains and hills by state
Peak	State	Range/region	Height (m)	Height (ft)	Coordinates
Kangchenjunga (shared with Nepal)	Sikkim	Eastern Himalaya	8,586	28,169	27.703°N 88.148°E
Kangto (shared with China)	Arunachal Pradesh	Eastern Himalaya	7,090	23,261	27.865°N 92.533°E
Mount Saramati (shared with Myanmar)	Nagaland	Naga Hills section of the Purvanchal Range	3,841	12,602	25.742°N 95.033°E
Mount Tempü (also known as Mount Iso)	Manipur	Naga Hills section of the Purvanchal Range	2,994	9,823	25.531°N 94.085°E
Phawngpui	Mizoram	Lushai Hills section of the Purvanchal Range	2,165	7,103	22.632°N 93.039°E
Shillong Peak	Meghalaya	Khasi Hills section of the Shillong Plateau	1,965	6,447	25.532°N 91.851°E
Unnamed peak	Assam	Cachar Hills section of the Karbi Anglong Plateau	1,960	6,430	25.321°N 93.453°E
Betlingchhip (also known as Sibrai-khung)	Tripura	Jampui Hills section of the Purvanchal Range	930	3,051	23.810°N 92.261°E

==== Brahmaputra river basin ====
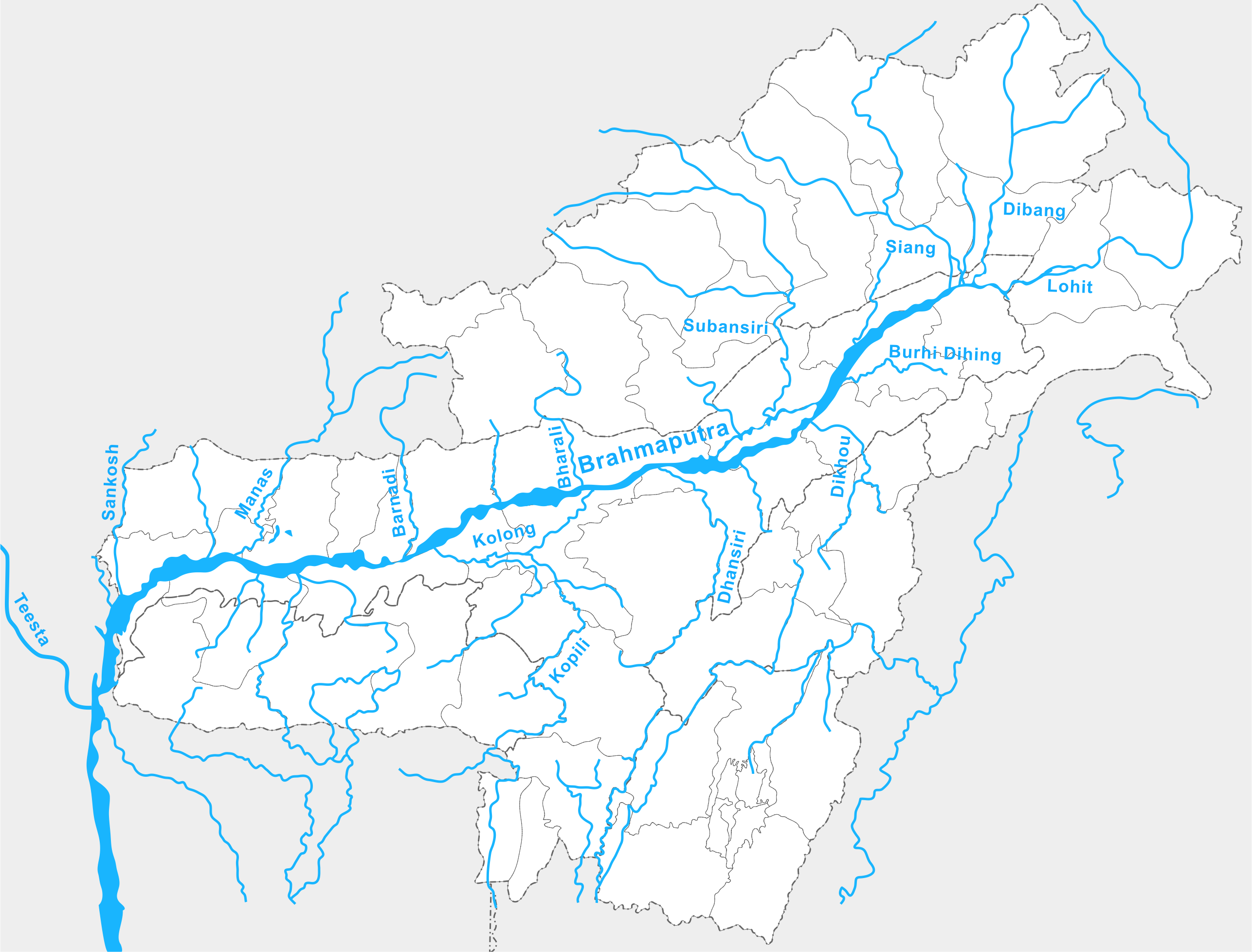
Brahmaputra river basin

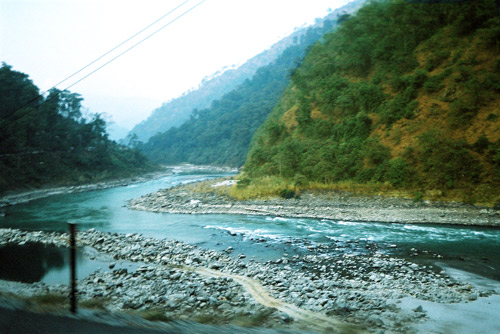
Teesta River, Sikkim

Tributaries of the Brahmaputra River in Northeast India:

- Beki River
- Bhogdoi River
- Dhansiri River
- Dibang River
- Dihing River
- Kameng River
- Kolong
- Kopili River
- Lohit River
- Manas River
- Sankosh River
- Subansiri River
- Teesta River

=== Climate ===
Indian map of Köppen climate classification

Northeast India has a subtropical climate that is influenced by its relief and influences from the southwest and northeast monsoons. The Himalayas to the north, the Meghalaya plateau to the south and the hills of Nagaland, Mizoram and Manipur to the east influences the climate. Since monsoon winds originating from the Bay of Bengal move northeast, these mountains force the moist winds upwards, causing them to cool adiabatically and condense into clouds, releasing heavy precipitation on these slopes. It is the rainiest region in the country, with most places receiving an average annual precipitation over 2,000 mm (80 in), which is mostly concentrated in summer during the monsoon. Cherrapunji, located on the Meghalaya plateau is one of the rainiest place in the world with an annual precipitation of 11,777 mm (463.7 in). Temperatures are moderate in the Brahmaputra and Barak valley river plains which decreases with altitude in the hilly areas. At the highest altitudes, there is permanent snow cover. In general, the region has 3 seasons: Winter, Summer, and rainy season in which the rainy season coincides with the summer months much like the rest of India. Winter is from early November until mid March while summer is from mid-April to mid-October.

Under the Köppen climate classification, the region is divided into 3 broad types: A (tropical climates), C (warm temperate mesothermal climates), and D (snow microthermal climates). The tropical climates are located in parts of Manipur, Tripura, Mizoram, and the Cachar plains south of 25˚N and are classified as tropical monsoon (Am). Much of Assam, Nagaland, northern parts of Meghalaya and Manipur and parts of Arunachal Pradesh fall within the warm temperature mesothermal climates (type C) where the mean temperatures in coldest months range from −3 to 18 °C (27 to 64 °F). The entire Brahmaputra valley has a humid subtropical climate (Cfa/Cwa) with hot summers. At altitudes between 500 and 1,500 m (1,600 and 4,900 ft) located in the eastern hills of Nagaland, Manipur and Arunachal Pradesh, a (Cfb/CWb) climate prevails with warm summers. Locations above 1,500 m (4,900 ft) in Meghalaya, parts of Nagaland, and northern Arunachal Pradesh have a (Cfc/Cwc) climate with short and cool summers. Finally, the extreme northern parts of Arunachal Pradesh are classified as humid continental climates with mean winter temperatures below −3 °C (27 °F).

==== Temperature ====
Temperatures vary by altitude with the warmest places being in the Brahmaputra and Barak River plains and the coldest at the highest altitudes. It is also influenced by proximity to the sea with the valleys and western areas being close to the sea, which moderates temperatures. Generally, temperatures in the hilly and mountainous areas are lower than the plains which lie at a lower altitude. Summer temperatures tend to be more uniform than winter temperatures due to high cloud cover and humidity.

In the Brahmaputra and Barak valley river plains, mean winter temperatures vary between 16 and 17 °C (61 and 63 °F) while mean summer temperatures are around 28 °C (82 °F). The highest summer temperatures occur in the West Tripura plain with Agartala, the capital of Tripura having mean maximum summer temperatures ranging between 33 and 35 °C (91 and 95 °F) in April. The highest temperatures in summer occur before the arrival of monsoons and thus eastern areas have the highest temperatures in June and July where the monsoon arrives later than western areas. In the Cachar Plain, located south of the Brahmaputra plain, temperatures are higher than the Brahmaputra plain although the temperature range is smaller owing to higher cloud cover and the monsoons that moderate night temperatures year round.

In the mountainous areas of Arunachal Pradesh, the Himalayan ranges in the northern border with India and China experience the lowest temperatures with heavy snow during winter and temperatures that drop below freezing. Areas with altitudes exceeding 2,000 metres (6,562 ft) receive snowfall during winters and have cool summers. Below 2,000 metres (6,562 ft) above sea level, winter temperatures reach up to 15 °C (59 °F) during the day with nights dropping to zero while summers are cool, with a mean maximum of 25 °C (77 °F) and a mean minimum of 15 °C (59 °F). In the hilly areas of Meghalaya, Nagaland, Manipur and Mizoram, winters are cold while summers are cool.

The plains in Manipur has colder winter minimums than what is warranted by its elevation owing to its geographic location which prevents winds that bring hot temperatures and humidity from coming into the Manipur plain, alongside being surrounded by hills on all sides. This creates temperature inversions during winter nights when cold air descends from the hills into the valleys below. For example, in Imphal, winter daytime temperatures hover around 21 °C (70 °F) but nighttime temperatures drop to 3 °C (37 °F).

==== Rainfall ====
No part of Northeast India receives less than 1,000 mm (40 in) of rainfall a year. Areas in the Brahmputra valley receive 2,000 mm (80 in) of rainfall a year while mountainous areas receive 2,000 to 3,000 mm (80 to 120 in) a year. The southwest monsoon is responsible for bringing 90% of the annual rainfall to the region. April to late October are the months where most of the rainfall in Northeast India occurs with June and July being the rainiest months. In most parts of the region, the average date of onset of the monsoons is 1 June. Southern areas are the first to receive the monsoon (May or June) with the Brahmaputra valley and the mountainous north receiving later (later May or June). In the hilly parts of Mizoram, the closer proximity to the Bay of Bengal causes it to experience early monsoons with June being the wettest season.

=== High-risk seismic zone ===
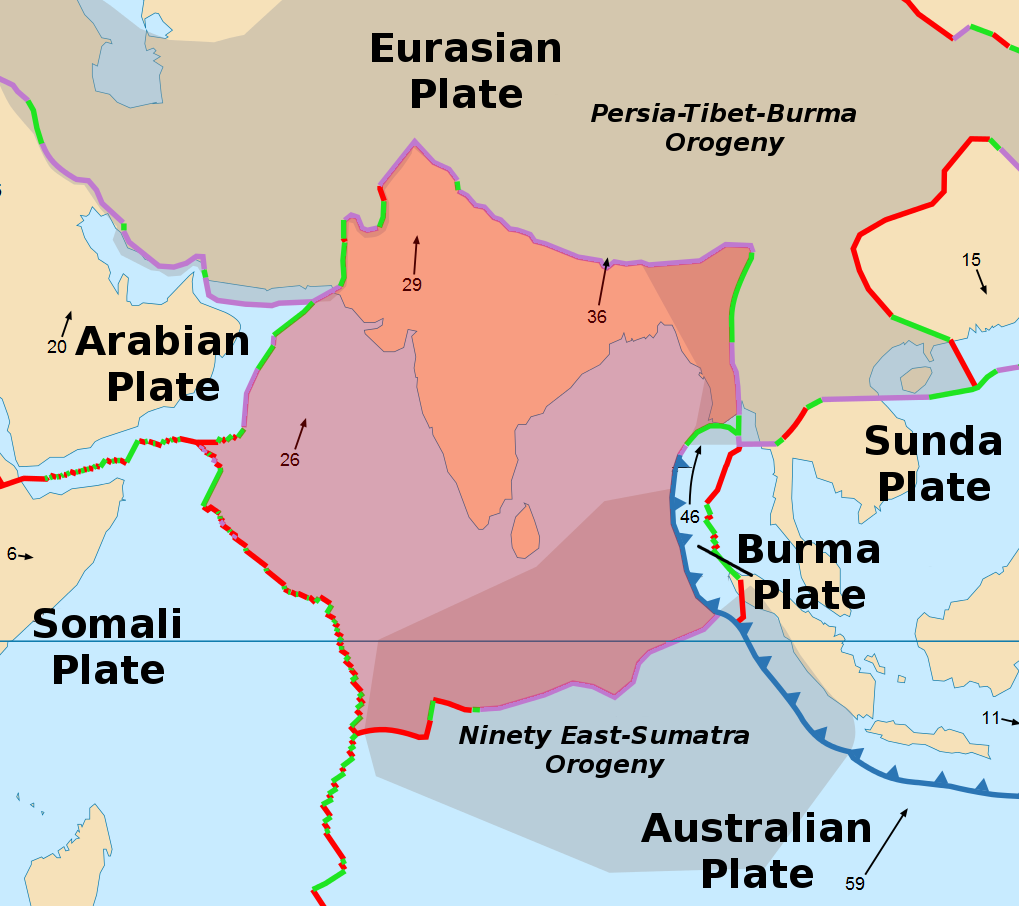
India Plate and other tectonic plates

The North Eastern Region of India is highly prone to earthquakes, caused by active fault planes formed by the convergence of three tectonic plates: the India Plate, Eurasian Plate and Burma Plate. Historically the region has suffered from two great earthquakes (M > 8.0) – 1897 Assam earthquake and 1950 Assam-Tibet earthquake – and about 20 large earthquakes (8.0 > M > 7.0) since 1897. The 1950 Assam-Tibet earthquake is still the largest earthquake in India.

== Wildlife ==
=== Flora ===
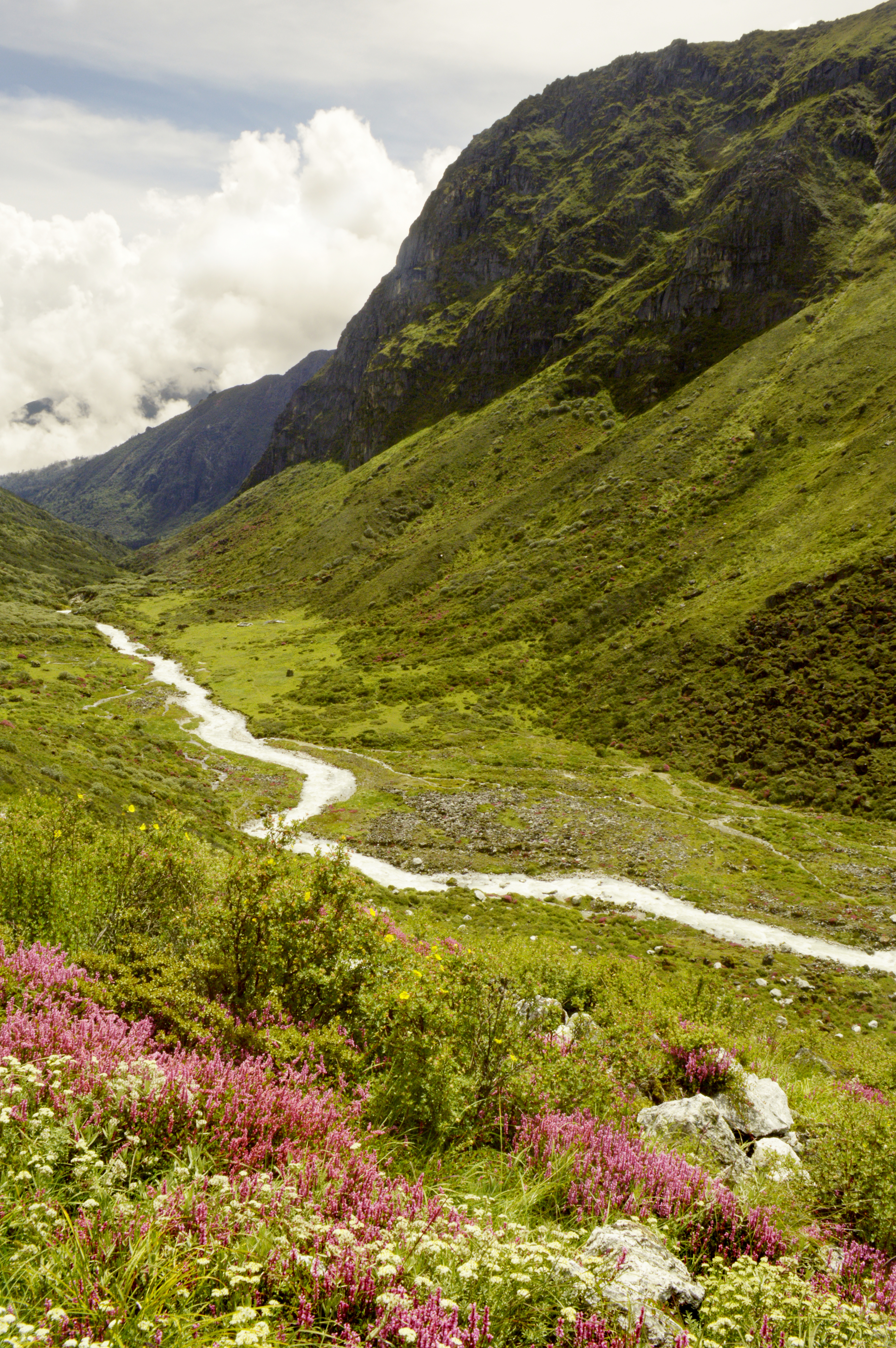
Khangchendzonga National Park

WWF has identified the entire Eastern Himalayas as a priority Global 200 ecoregion. Conservation International has upscaled the Eastern Himalaya hotspot to include all the eight states of Northeast India, along with the neighbouring countries of Bhutan, southern China and Myanmar.

The region has been identified by the Indian Council of Agricultural Research as a centre of rice germplasm. The National Bureau of Plant Genetic Resources (NBPGR), India, has highlighted the region as being rich in wild relatives of crop plants. It is the centre of origin of citrus fruits. Two primitive variety of maize, Sikkim Primitive 1 and 2, have been reported from Sikkim (Dhawan, 1964). Although jhum cultivation, a traditional system of agriculture, is often cited as a reason for the loss of forest cover of the region, this primary agricultural economic activity practised by local tribes supported the cultivation of 35 varieties of crops. The region is rich in medicinal plants and many other rare and endangered taxa. Its high endemism in both higher plants, vertebrates, and avian diversity has qualified it as a biodiversity hotspot.

The following figures highlight the biodiversity significance of the region:

- 51 forest types are found in the region, broadly classified into six major types – tropical moist deciduous forests, tropical semi-evergreen forests, tropical wet evergreen forests, subtropical forests, temperate forests, and alpine forests.
- Out of the nine important vegetation types of India, six are found in the North Eastern Region.
- These forests harbour 8,000 out of 15,000 species of flowering plants. In floral species richness, the highest diversity is reported from the states of Arunachal Pradesh (5000 species) and Sikkim (4500 species) among the North Eastern states.
- According to the Indian Red Data Book, published by the Botanical Survey of India, 10 per cent of the flowering plants in the country are endangered. Of the 1500 endangered floral species, 800 are reported from Northeast India.
- Most of the North Eastern states have more than 60% of their area under forest cover, a minimum suggested coverage for the hill states in the country in order to protect from erosion.
- Northeast India is a part of Indo-Burma hotspot. This hotspot is the second largest in the world, next only to the Mediterranean Basin, with an area 2,206,000 square kilometres (852,000 sq mi) among the 25 identified.

=== Fauna ===
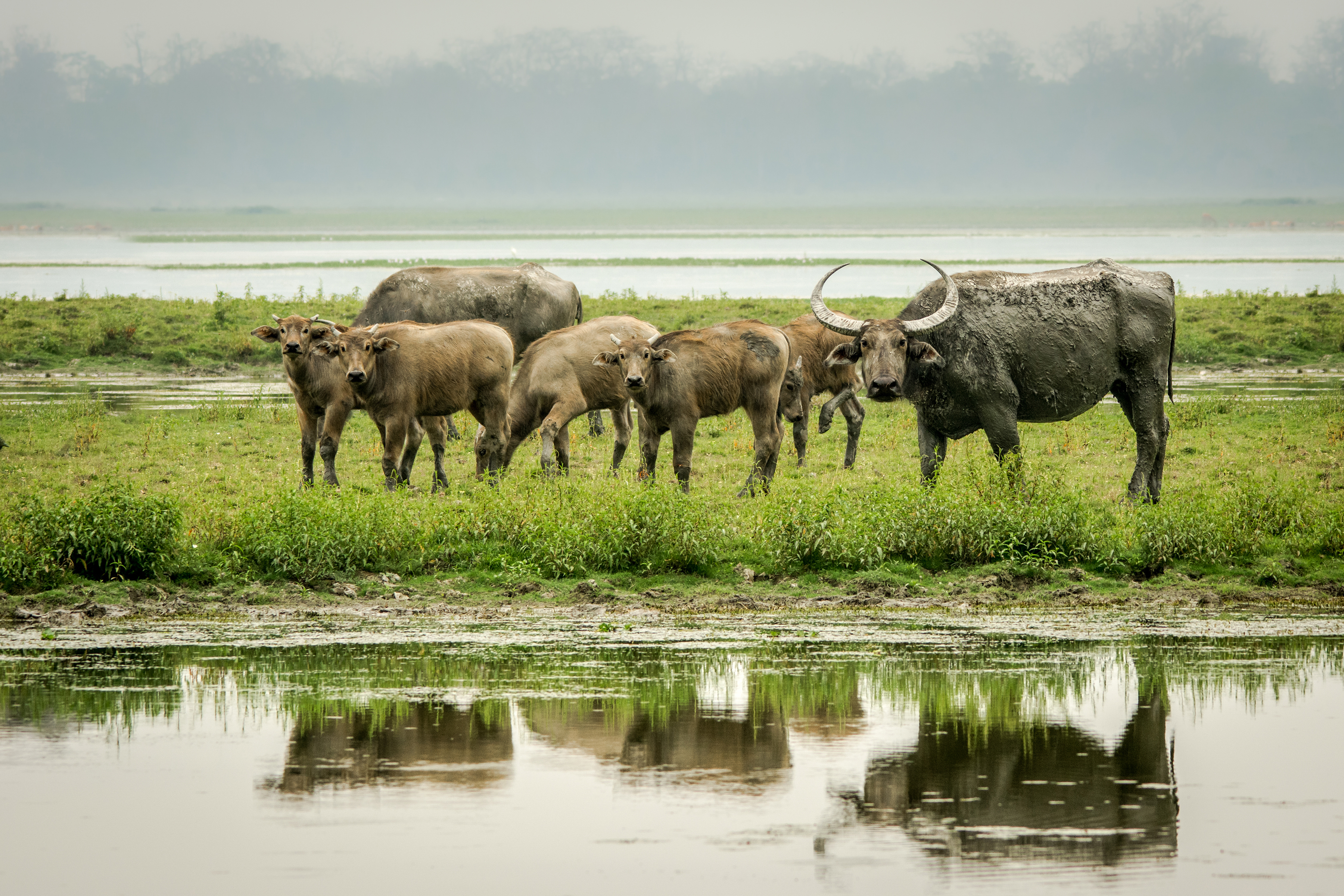
Asiatic buffalo at Kaziranga National Park

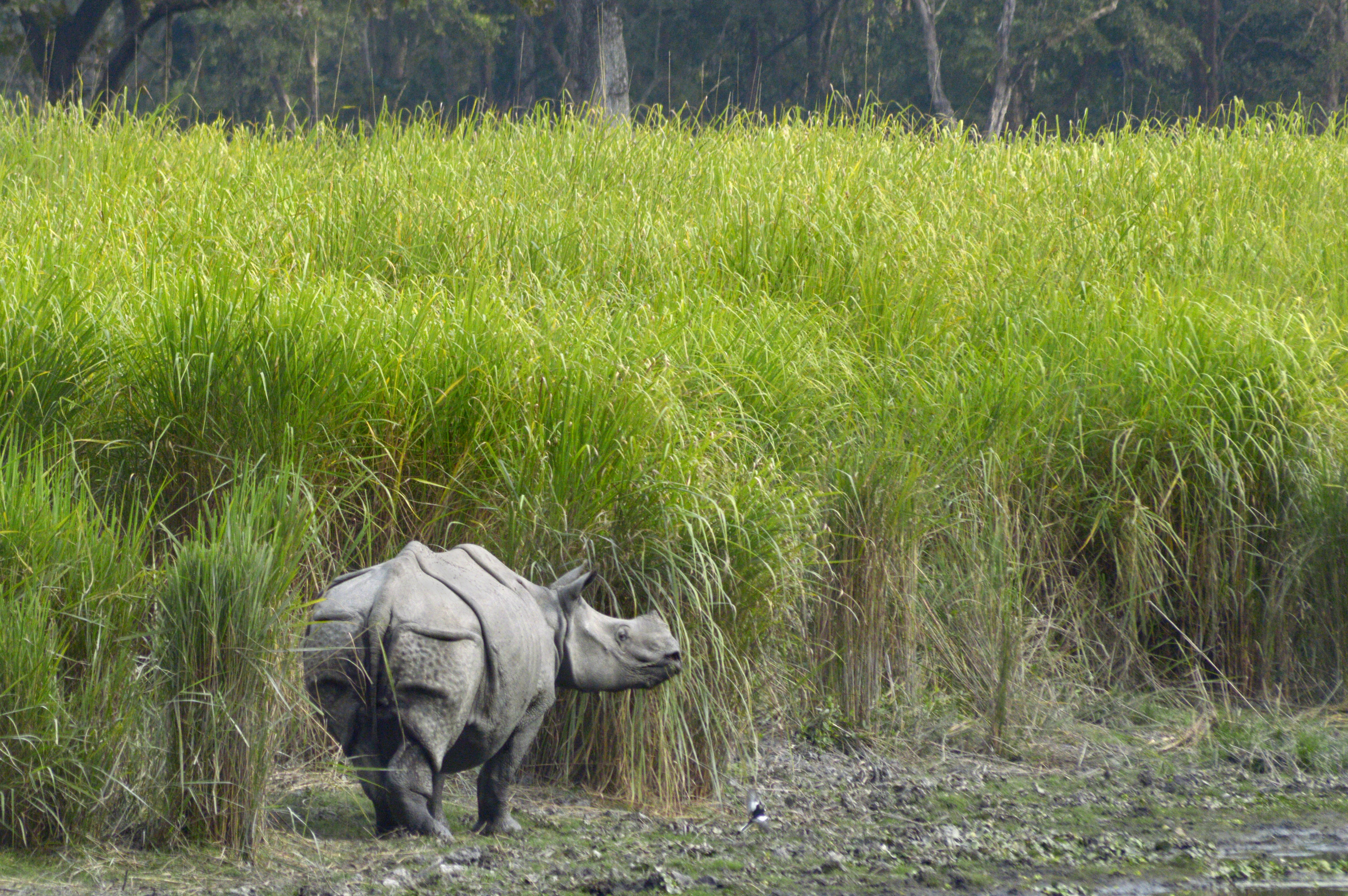
One-horned rhinoceros at Kaziranga National Park

The International Council for Bird Preservation, UK identified the Assam plains and the Eastern Himalaya as an Endemic Bird Area (EBA). The EBA has an area of 220,000 square kilometres (85,000 sq mi) following the Himalayan range in the countries of Bangladesh, Bhutan, China, Nepal, Myanmar and the Indian states of Sikkim, North Bengal, Assam, Nagaland, Manipur, Meghalaya and Mizoram. Because of a southward occurrence of this mountain range in comparison to other Himalayan ranges, this region has a distinctly different climate, with warmer mean temperatures and fewer days with frost, and much higher rainfall. This has resulted in the occurrence of a number of restricted-range bird species. More than two critically endangered species, three endangered species, and 14 vulnerable species of birds are in this EBA. Stattersfield et al. (1998) identified 22 restricted range species, out of which 19 are confined to this region and the remaining three are present in other endemic and secondary areas. Eleven of the 22 restricted-range species found in this region are considered as threatened (Birdlife International 2001), a number greater than in any other EBA of India.

Northeast India has a high diversity of fauna. There are as many as 15 species of non-human primates, including the hoolock gibbon, stumptied macaque, pigtailed macaque, golden langur, hanuman langur and rhesus monkey. The one-horned rhinoceros is among the endangered species found in the region. The forests also support elephant, royal Bengal tiger, leopard, golden cat, fishing cat, marbled cat and Bengal fox, among others. The Gangetic dolphin in the Brahmaputra is also endangered, as are the otter, mugger crocodile, tortoise and some fish.

WWF has identified the following priority ecoregions in Northeast India:

Brahmaputra Valley semi-evergreen forests
Eastern Himalayan broadleaf forests
Eastern Himalayan subalpine conifer forests
Northeast India–Myanmar pine forests

=== National parks ===
National park	Location	State	Area (km^{2})	Importance	Vegetation
Namdapha National Park	Changlang district	Arunachal Pradesh	1,985	Largest protected area in Eastern Himalaya	Tropical and subtropical moist broadleaf forests, montane forests
Manas National Park	Baksa district	Assam	950	UNESCO World Heritage Site	Tropical and subtropical moist broadleaf forests
Kaziranga National Park	Golaghat and Nagaon districts	Assam	882	UNESCO World Heritage Site	Brahmaputra Valley semi-evergreen forests, Terai–Duar savanna and grasslands
Khangchendzonga National Park	North Sikkim district	Sikkim	850	UNESCO Mixed World Heritage Site and highest altitude wildlife protected area in India	Sub-tropical to Alpine, Krummholz (stunted forest)
Mouling National Park	Upper Siang, West Siang and East Siang districts	Arunachal Pradesh	483		Tropical to Temperate forests
Dibru-Saikhowa National Park	Dibrugarh and Tinsukia districts	Assam	350		Brahmaputra Valley semi-evergreen forests
Balphakram National Park	South Garo Hills district	Meghalaya	220		Sub-tropical evergreen deciduous forests
Intangki National Park	Peren district	Nagaland	202		Temperate evergreen forests
Nameri National Park	Sonitpur district	Assam	200		Brahmaputra Valley semi-evergreen forests
Murlen National Park	Champhai district	Mizoram	100		Montane sub-tropical semi-evergreen forest
Orang National Park	Darrang and Sonitpur	Assam	79		Eastern seasonal swamp forests, Eastern Himalayan moist mixed deciduous forests, eastern wet alluvial grasslands
Phawngpui National Park	Lawngtlai district	Mizoram	50		Temperate forests
Nokrek National Park	West Garo Hills district	Meghalaya	48		Tropical and subtropical moist broadleaf forests
Sirohi National Park	Ukhrul district	Manipur	41		Mizoram–Manipur–Kachin rain forests
Keibul Lamjao National Park	Bishnupur district	Manipur	40	World's only floating National park	Phumdi (floating marshes)
Bison (Rajbari) National Park	South Tripura district	Tripura	32		Tropical semi-evergreen and moist deciduous forests
Clouded Leopard National Park	Sepahijala district	Tripura	5		Tropical and subtropical moist broadleaf forests

=== State symbols ===
	Arunachal Pradesh	Assam	Manipur	Meghalaya
Animal	Mithun (Bos frontalis)	Indian rhinoceros (Rhinoceros unicornis)	Sangai (Rucervus eldii eldii)	Clouded leopard (Neofelis nebulosa)
Bird	Hornbill (Buceros bicornis)	White-winged duck (Asarcornis scutulata)	Mrs. Hume's pheasant (Syrmaticus humiae)	Hill myna (Gracula religiosa)
Flower	Foxtail orchid (Rhynchostylis retusa)	Foxtail orchid (Rhynchostylis retusa)	Siroi lily (Lilium mackliniae)	Lady's Slipper Orchid (Paphiopedilum insigne)
Tree	Hollong (Dipterocarpus macrocarpus)	Hollong (Dipterocarpus macrocarpus)	Uningthou (Phoebe hainesiana)	Gamhar (Gmelina arborea)
	Mizoram	Nagaland	Sikkim	Tripura
Animal	Himalayan serow (Capricornis thar)	Mithun (Bos frontalis)	Red panda (Ailurus fulgens)	Phayre's leaf monkey (Trachypithecus phayrei)
Bird	Mrs. Hume's pheasant (Syrmaticus humiae)	Blyth's tragopan (Tragopan blythii)	Blood pheasant (Ithaginis cruentus)	Green imperial pigeon (Ducula aenea)
Flower	Red vanda (Renanthera imschootiana)	Tree rhododendron (Rhododendron arboreum)	Noble dendrobium (Dendrobium nobile)	Indian rose chestnut (Mesua ferrea)
Tree	Indian rose chestnut (Mesua ferrea)	Alder (Alnus nepalensis)	Rhododendron (Rhododendron niveum)	Agarwood (Aquilaria agallocha)

== Demographics ==
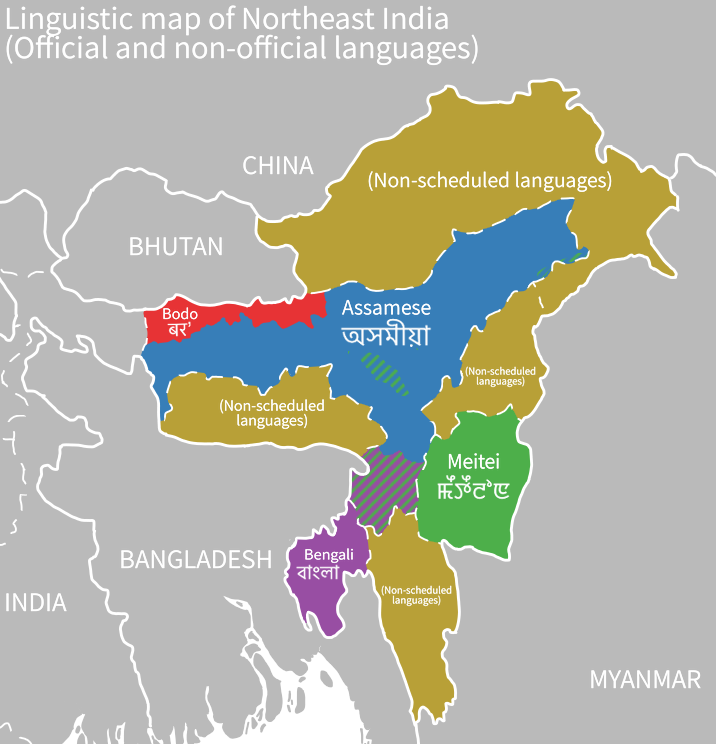
"Scheduled" and "non-scheduled" official languages of Northeast Indian states

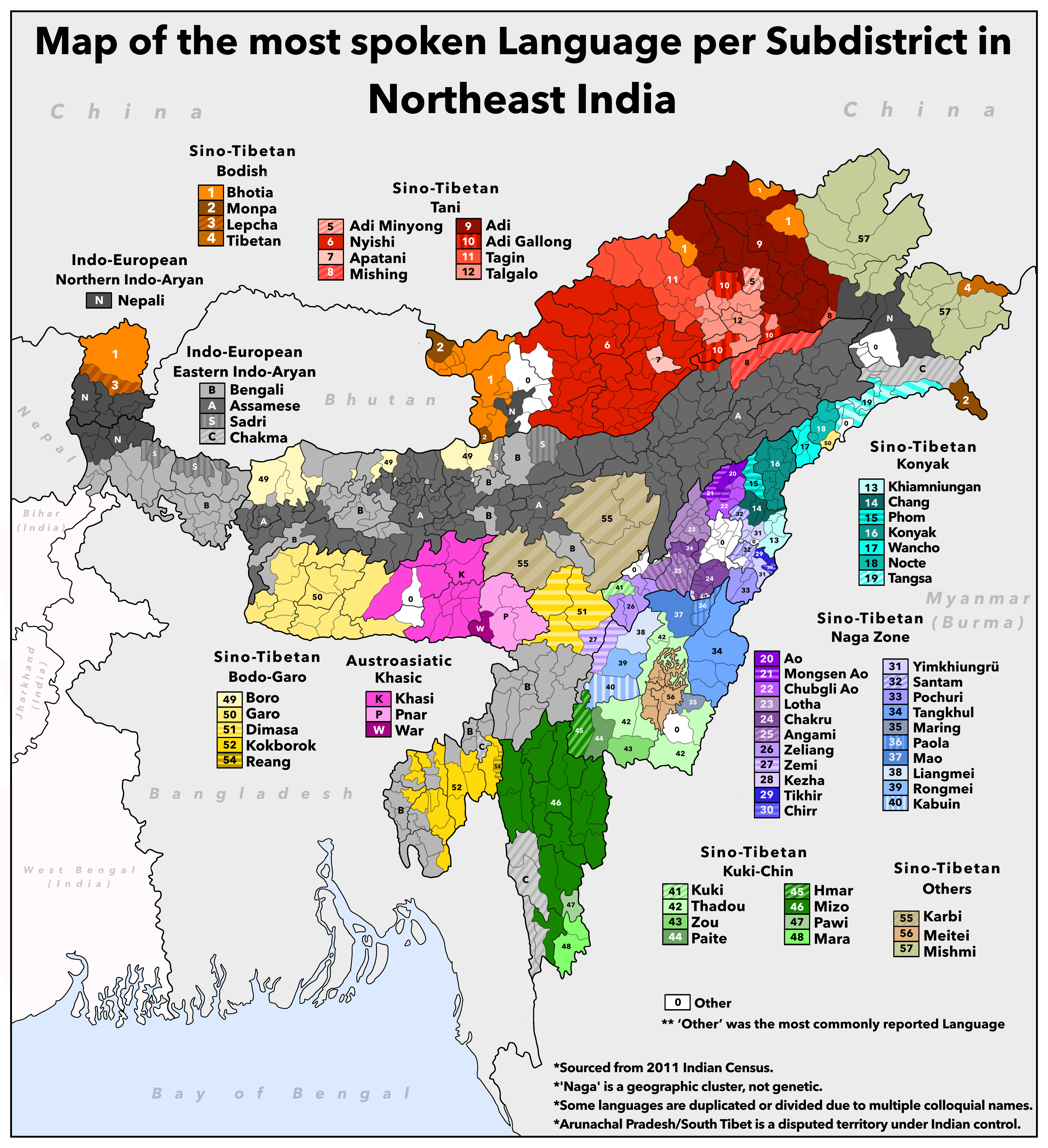
Map of most spoken language per subdistrict in Northeast India

The total population of Northeast India is 46 million with 68 per cent of that living in Assam alone. Assam also has a higher population density of 397 persons per km^{2} than the national average of 382 persons per km^{2}. The literacy rates in the states of the Northeastern region, except those in Arunachal Pradesh and Assam, are higher than the national average of 74 per cent. As per 2011 census, Meghalaya recorded the highest population growth of 27.8 per cent among all the states of the region, higher than the national average at 17.64 per cent; while Nagaland recorded the lowest in the entire country with a negative 0.5 per cent.

Guwahati in Assam is the largest metropolis in Northeast India and has been described as the gateway to the Northeast.

State	Population	Males	Females	Sex ratio	Literacy %	Rural population	Urban population	Area (km^{2})	Density (/km^{2})
Arunachal Pradesh	1,383,727	713,912	669,815	938	65.38	870,087	227,881	83,743	17
Assam	31,205,576	15,939,443	15,266,133	958	72.19	23,216,288	3,439,240	78,438	397
Manipur	2,570,390	1,290,171	1,280,219	992	79.21	1,590,820	575,968	22,327	122
Meghalaya	2,966,889	1,491,832	1,475,057	989	74.43	1,864,711	454,111	22,429	132
Mizoram	1,097,206	555,339	541,867	976	91.33	447,567	441,006	21,081	52
Nagaland	1,978,502	1,024,649	953,853	931	79.55	1,647,249	342,787	16,579	119
Sikkim	610,577	323,070	287,507	890	81.42	480,981	59,870	7,096	86
Tripura	3,673,917	2,087,059	2,086,858	960	91.58	2,639,134	1,534,783	10,486	350

=== Largest cities by population ===
According to the 2011 census, the largest cities in Northeast India are:

Rank	City	Type	State	Population	Rank	City	Type	State	Population
1	Guwahati	City	Assam	968,549	9	Jorhat	UA	Assam	153,889
2	Agartala	City	Tripura	622,613	10	Nagaon	UA	Assam	147,496
3	Imphal	UA	Manipur	414,288	11	Bongaigaon	UA	Assam	139,650
4	Dimapur	City	Nagaland	379,769	12	Tinsukia	UA	Assam	126,389
5	Shillong	UA	Meghalaya	354,325	13	Tezpur	UA	Assam	102,505
6	Aizawl	City	Mizoram	291,822	14	Kohima	UA	Nagaland	100,000
7	Silchar	City	Assam	389,136	15	Gangtok	City	Sikkim	98,658
8	Dibrugarh	UA	Assam	154,296	16	Itanagar	City	Arunachal Pradesh	95,650
UA: Urban Agglomeration

=== Languages ===
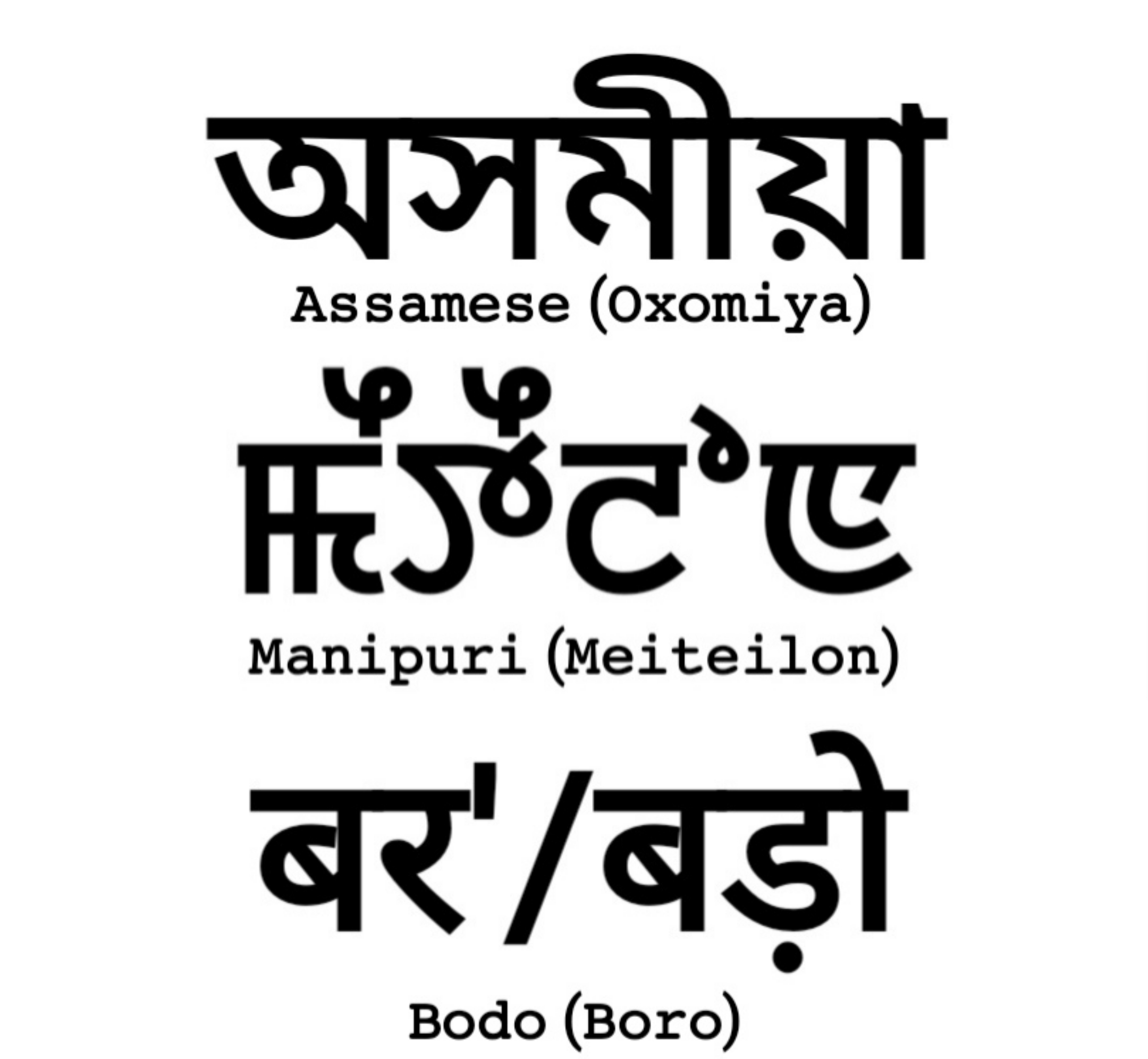
The official languages of the Indian Republic recognised by the Constitution of India which are indigenous to Northeast India, written in their respective official scripts

Northeast India constitutes a single linguistic region within the Indian national context, with about 220 languages in multiple language families (Indo-European, Sino-Tibetan, Kra–Dai, Austroasiatic, as well as some creole languages) that share a number of features that set them apart from most other areas of the Indian subcontinent (such as alveolar consonants rather than the more typical dental/retroflex distinction). Assamese, an Indo-Aryan language spoken mostly in the Brahmaputra Valley, developed as a lingua franca for many speech communities. Assamese-based pidgin/creoles have developed in Nagaland (Nagamese) and Arunachal (Nefamese), though Nefamese has been replaced by Hindi in recent times. Bengali language is another Indo-Aryan language spoken in South Assam in the Barak Valley and Tripura, being the majority and official language in both the regions. The Austro-Asiatic family is represented by the Khasi, Jaintia and War languages of Meghalaya. A small number of Tai–Kadai languages (Ahom, Tai Phake, Khamti, etc.) are also spoken.

Sino-Tibetan is represented by a number of languages that differ significantly from each other, some of which are: Boro, Rabha, Karbi, Mising, Tiwa, Deori, Hmar (including Biate, Chorei, Halam, Hrangkhawl, Kaipeng, Molsom, Ranglong, Saihriem, Sakachep, Thangachep, Thiek), Zeme Naga, Rengma Naga and, Kuki (Thadou language) (Assam); Garo, Rabha, Hmar (including Biate, Sakachep) (Meghalaya); Ao, Angami, Sema, Lotha, Konyak, Chakhesang, Chang, Khiamniungan, Phom, Pochury, Rengma, Sangtam, Tikhir, Yimkhiung, Zeliang, Kuki (Thadou), and Hmar (including Sakachep/Khelma) etc. (Nagaland); Mizo languages such as Lusei (including Hualngo), Hmar (including Chorei, Darlawng, Darngawn, Kaipeng, Khawlhring, Molsom, Ngente, Sakachep, Zote), Lai (including Hakha, Falam, Khualsim, Zanniet, Sim), Mara languages, Ralte/Galte, Zomi/Paihte, Kuki/Thahdo, etc. (Mizoram); Hrusso, Tanee, Niyshi, Adi, Abor, Nocte, Apatani, Mishmi etc. (Arunachal). Kokborok is the dominant among the tribal people of Tripura and one of the official languages of the state, while Garo, Hmar (including Bong, Bongcher, Chorei, Dab, Darlawng, Hmarchaphang, Hrangkhawl, Langkai, Kaipeng, Koloi, Korbong, Molsom, Ranglong, Rupini, Saihmar, Sakachep, Thangachep)), Lusei (including Rokhum), etc. are also spoken. Meitei is the official language in Manipur, the dominant language of the Imphal Valley; while "Naga" languages such as Poumai, Mao, Maram, Rongmei (Kabui),Tangkhul, Zeme, Liangmei, Inpui, Thangal Naga and Mizo languages such as Kuki/Thado, Lusei, Zomi languages (including Paite, Simte, Vaiphei, Zou, Mate, Thangkhal, Tedim-Chin), Gangte and Hmar languages (including Biete, Hrangkhawl, Thiek, Zote) predominate in individual hill areas of the state.

Main languages of North East India
1. Assamese (33.2%)
2. Bengali (26.2%)
3. Hindi (5.45%)
4. Manipuri (3.79%)
5. Bodo (3.14%)
6. Khasi (3.12%)
7. Nepali (2.73%)
8. Garo (2.49%)
9. Kokborok (2.21%)
10. Mizo (1.80%)
11. Mishing (1.38%)
12. Karbi (1.15%)
13. Others (13.3%)

Among other Indo-Aryan languages, Chakma is spoken in Mizoram and Hajong in Assam and Meghalaya. Nepali, an Indo-Aryan language, is dominant in Sikkim, besides the Sino-Tibetan languages Limbu, Bhutia, Lepcha, Rai, Tamang, Sherpa, etc. Bengali was made the official language of Colonial Assam from 1836 to 1873.

==== Official languages ====
State	Official languages
Arunachal Pradesh	English
Assam	Assamese, Bodo, Meitei (Manipuri), Bengali
Manipur	Meitei
Meghalaya	English
Mizoram	Mizo, English
Nagaland	English
Sikkim	Sikkimese, Lepcha, Nepali, English
Tripura	Bengali, Kokborok, English

==== Etymology of state names ====
Name of state	Origin	Literal meaning
Arunachal Pradesh	Sanskrit	Land of the dawn-lit mountains
Assam	Native name	Both Assam and Ahom are from asam, acam, a corruption of Shan/Shyam as used for the Ahoms.
Manipur	Sanskrit	Land abundant with jewels, adopted in the 18th century
Meghalaya	Sanskrit	Abode of the clouds, coined by Shiba P. Chatterjee
Mizoram	Mizo language	Land of the Mizo people; Ram means land
Nagaland	English	Land of the Naga people
Sikkim	Limbu language	New House – Derived from the word "Sukhim", "Su" meaning new and "Khim" meaning house
Tripura	Kokborok	Sanskrit version of native names: Tipra, Tuipura, Twipra etc. It literally means Land near the Water – Derived from the word "TWIPRA", "Twi" meaning water and "Bupra" meaning near, as Tripura is slightly near the Bay of Bengal.

=== Religions ===
Religion in Northeast India (2011)
1. Hinduism (54.0%)
2. Islam (25.1%)
3. Christianity (17.2%)
4. Buddhism (1.37%)
5. No religion (0.21%)
6. Jainism (0.07%)
7. Sikhism (0.07%)
8. Other religions (1.97%)

Hinduism is the majority religion in the North Eastern states of Assam, Tripura, Manipur, Sikkim and the faith of a sizeable minority in Arunachal Pradesh, while Christianity is the majority religion in Meghalaya, Nagaland and Mizoram and the plurality faith of Manipur and Arunachal Pradesh. A significant community of the state of Arunachal Pradesh follows the indigenous religion of Donyi-Polo. Islam has a significant presence in Assam and about 93% of all North East Muslims are concentrated in that state alone. Meanwhile, about 30% of India's Christian population is concentrated in the North Eastern region. There is a significant presence of Buddhism in Sikkim, Arunachal Pradesh and Mizoram.

Religious population in North Eastern Region, according to 2011 Census of India
State	Hinduism		Islam		Christianity		Buddhism		Jainism		Sikhism		Other Religions		Religion Not Stated	
	Populat.	%	Populat.	%	Populat.	%	Populat.	%	Populat.	%	Populat.	%	Populat.	%	Populat.	
Arunachal Pradesh	401,876	29.04	27,045	~2.00	418,732	30.26	162,815	11.70	771	0.06	3,287	0.24	362,553	26.20	6,648	0.48
Assam	19,180,759	61.47	10,679,345	34.2	1,165,867	3.74	54,993	0.18	25,949	0.08	20,672	0.07	27,118	0.09	50,873	0.16
Manipur	1,181,876	41.39	239,836	8.40	1,179,043	41.29	7,084	0.25	1,692	0.06	1,527	0.05	233,767	8.19	10,969	0.38
Meghalaya	342,078	11.52	130,399	4.40	2,213,027	74.59	9,864	0.33	627	0.20	3,045	0.10	258,271	8.70	9,578	0.35
Mizoram	30,136	2.75	14,832	1.35	956,331	87.16	93,411	8.51	376	0.03	286	0.03	808	0.07	1,026	0.09
Nagaland	173,054	8.75	48,963	2.47	1,739,651	87.92	6,759	0.34	2,655	0.13	1,890	0.01	3,214	0.16	2,316	0.12
Sikkim	352,662	57.76	9,867	1.60	60,522	9.91	167,216	27.39	314	0.05	1,868	0.31	16,300	2.67	1,828	0.30
Tripura	3,063,903	83.40	316,042	8.64	159,882	4.35	125,385	3.41	860	0.03	1,070	0.03	1,514	0.04	5,261	0.14
Total	24,726,344	54.02	11,466,329	25.05	7,893,055	17.24	627,527	1.37	33,244	0.07	33,645	0.07	903,545	1.97	88,499	0.19

=== Ethnic groups ===
Northeast India has over 200 ethnic groups and an equal number of dialects in which Bodo form the largest tribal ethnic group. The hills states in the region like Arunachal Pradesh, Meghalaya, Mizoram, and Nagaland are predominantly inhabited by tribal people with a degree of diversity even within the tribal groups. The region's population results from ancient and continuous flows of migrations from Tibet, Indo-Gangetic India, the Himalayas, present Bangladesh, and Myanmar.

==== Majority communities ====
These ethnic groups form significant majorities in the states/regions of Northeast India:

- Assamese people (48.38% and 55.65%), largest ethnicity in Assam overall and Brahmaputra Valley region of Assam
- Tani people (40.32%), largest ethnicity in Arunachal Pradesh
- Bodo people (30.47%), largest ethnicity in Bodoland region of Assam
- Bengali people (63.48% and 80.84%), largest ethnicity in Tripura state and Barak Valley region of Assam
- Meitei people (53.3%), largest ethnicity in Manipur
- Tripuri people largest ethnicity in Tripura Tribal Areas Autonomous District Council of Tripura
- Mizo people (73.14%), largest ethnicity in Mizoram
- Khasi people (46.24%), largest ethnicity in Meghalaya
- Naga people (88.24%), largest ethnicity in Nagaland
- Nepali people (62.6%), largest ethnicity in Sikkim
- Sikkimese people, native ethnicity of Sikkim

==== Minority communities ====
These ethnic groups form minorities in the states of Northeast India:

- Bhojpuri
- Bishnupriya
- Biate
- Bodo
- Chakma
- Deori
- Dimasa
- Garo
- Hajong
- Hmar
- Karbi
- Kami (caste)
- Khampti
- Koch Rajbongshi
- Kom
- Lepcha
- Limbu
- Lotha Naga
- Miji
- Miyas
- Mara
- Mishmi
- Nyishi
- Nepali
- Paite
- Pnar
- Purvottar maithili
- Rabha
- Ranglong (Langrong)
- Rai
- Singpho
- Sylheti
- Tamang
- Tiwa
- Tripuri
- Kuki people (Kuki: Thadou, Baite, Mate, Khongsai, Haokip, Doungel, Hangmi, Touthang, Kipgen, Hangmi, Neisel, Chongloi, etc.)
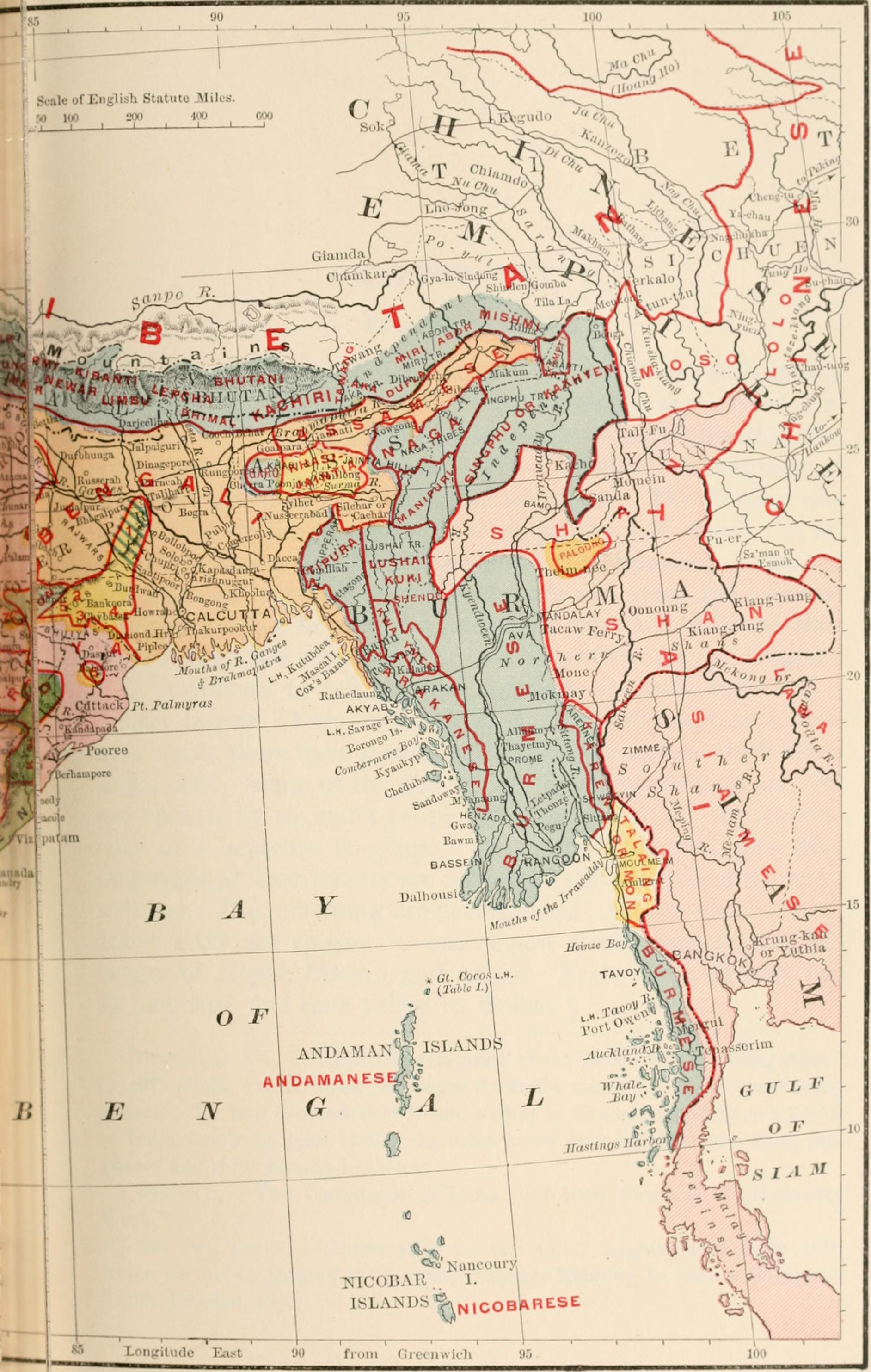
British India map of Northeast India by ethnicity and language, 1891

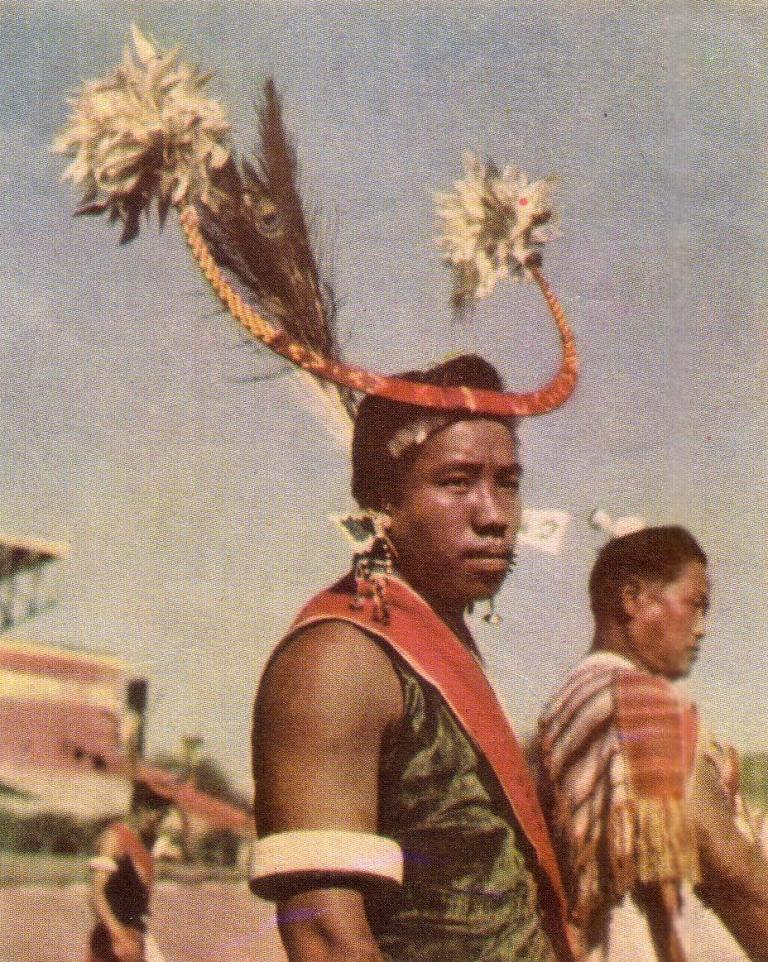
A Naga warrior in 1960

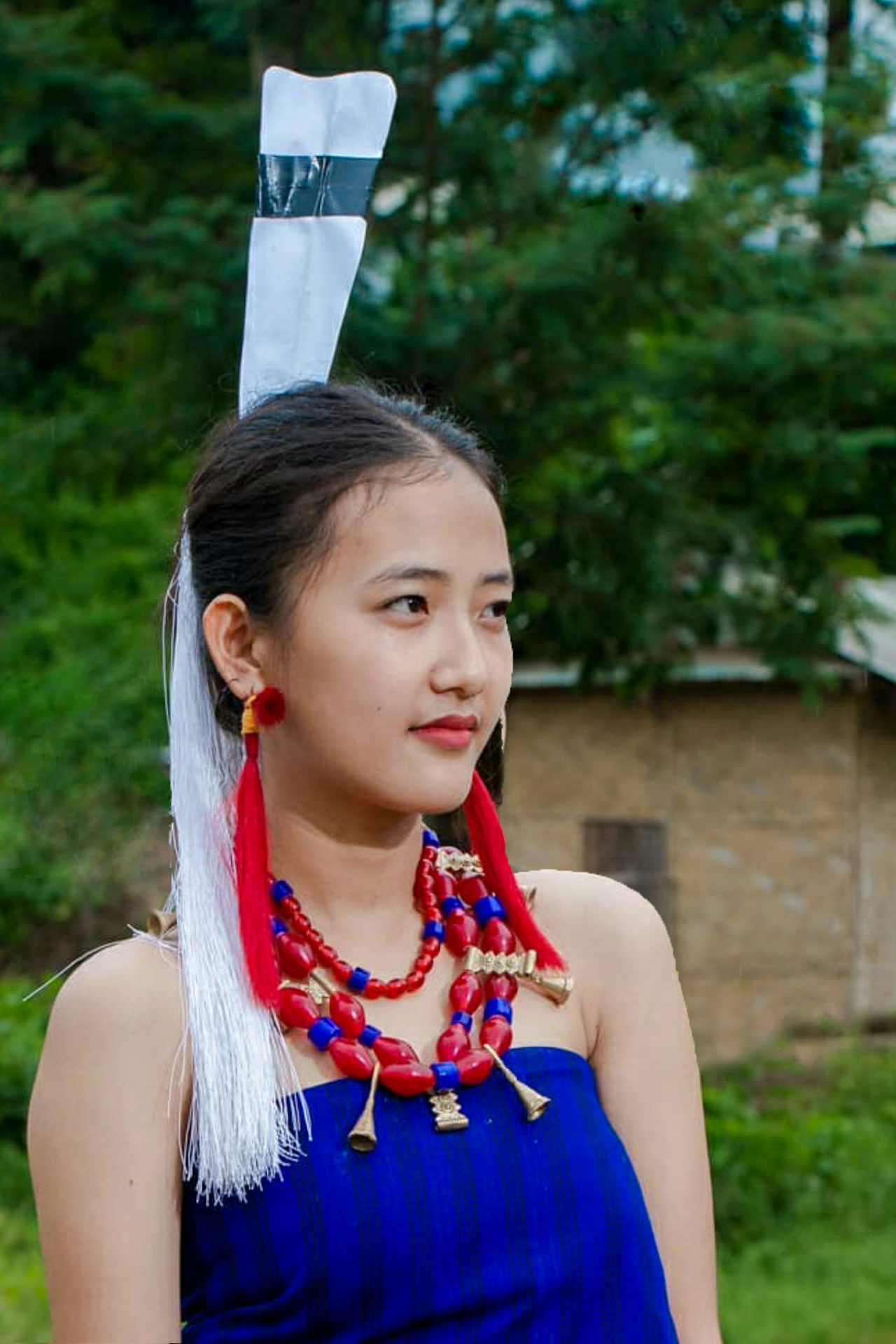
An Ao Naga girl in her traditional attire in Nagaland

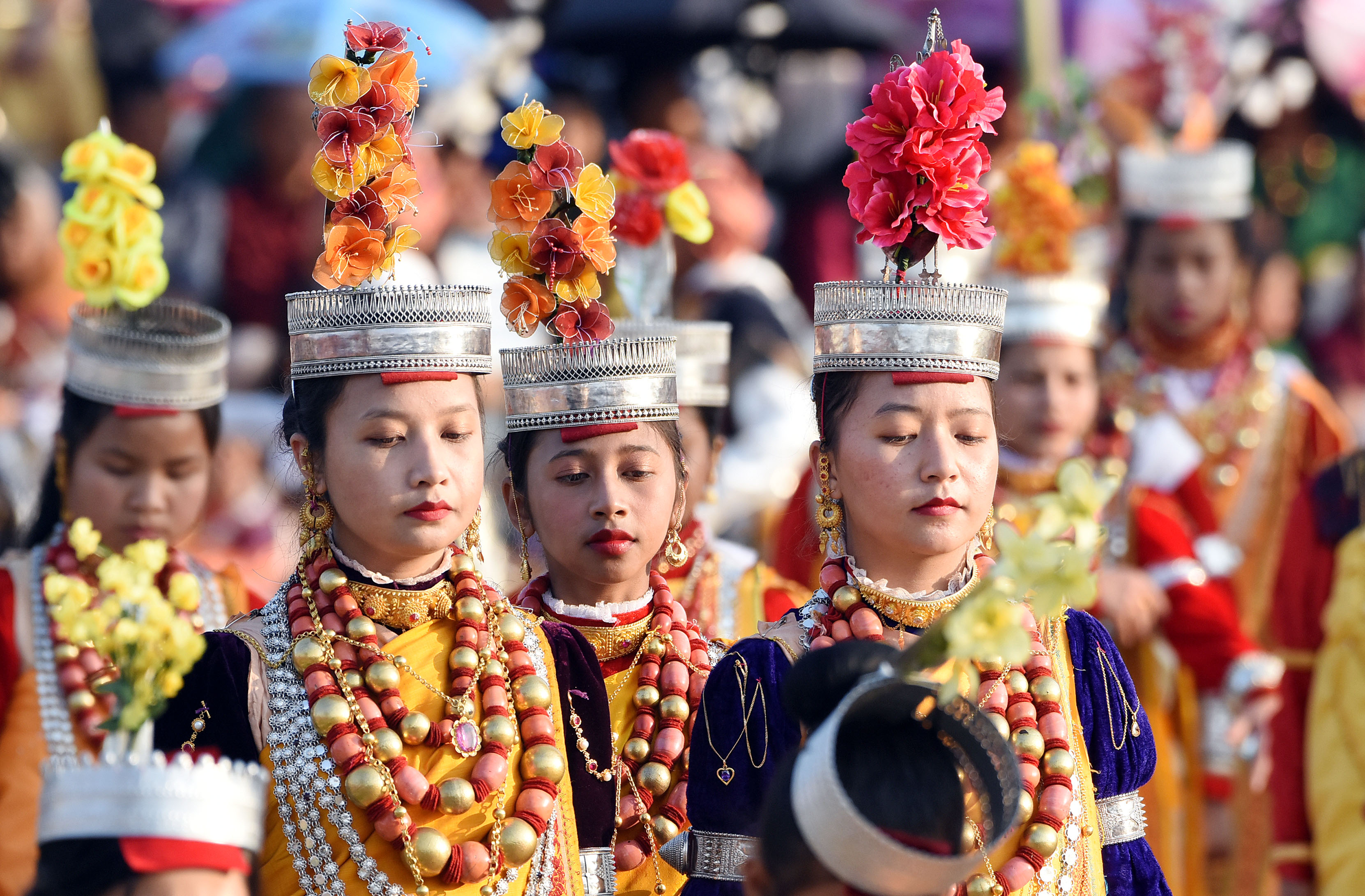
Shad suk Mynsiem, a Khasi festival

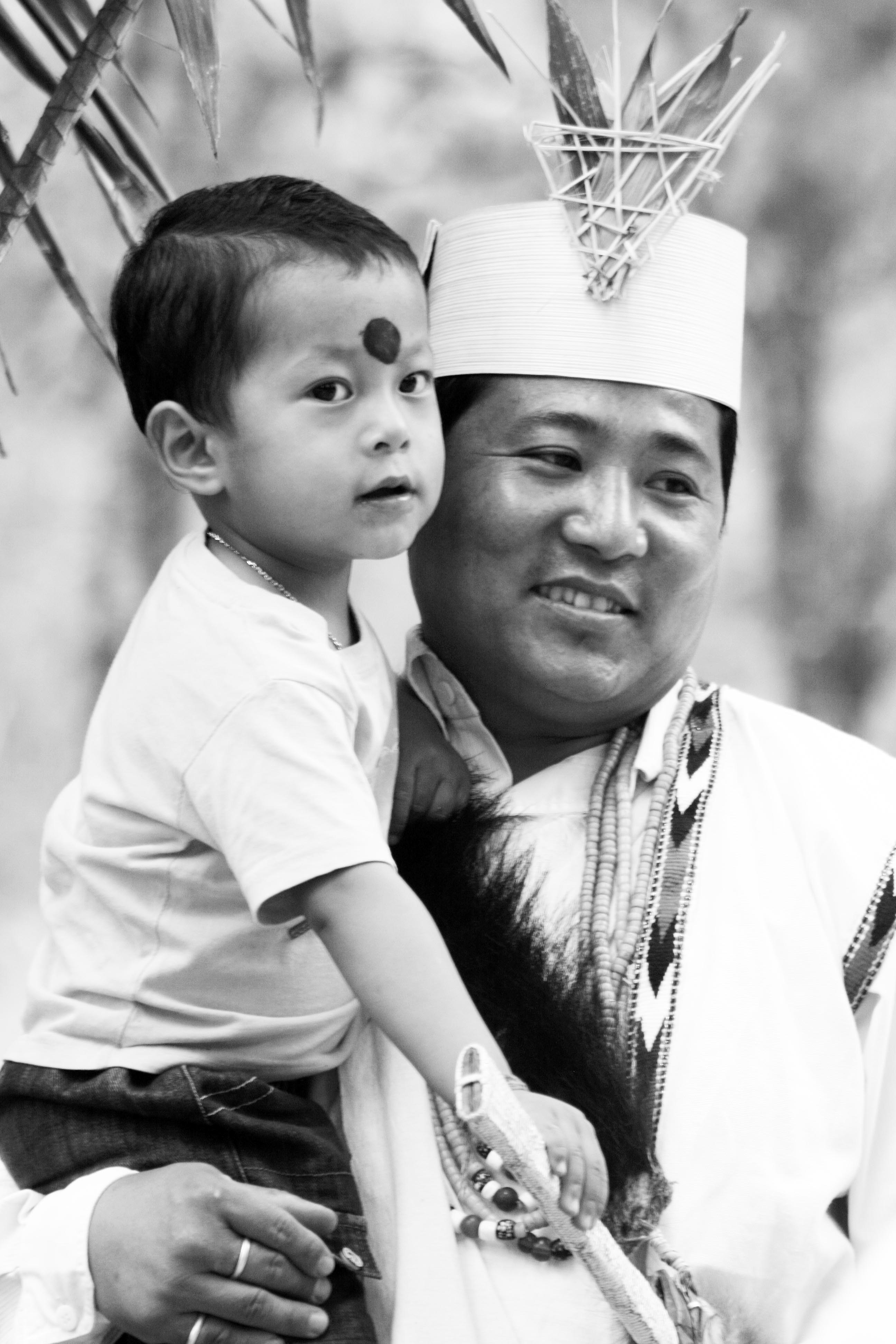
Aka tribe, Arunachal Pradesh

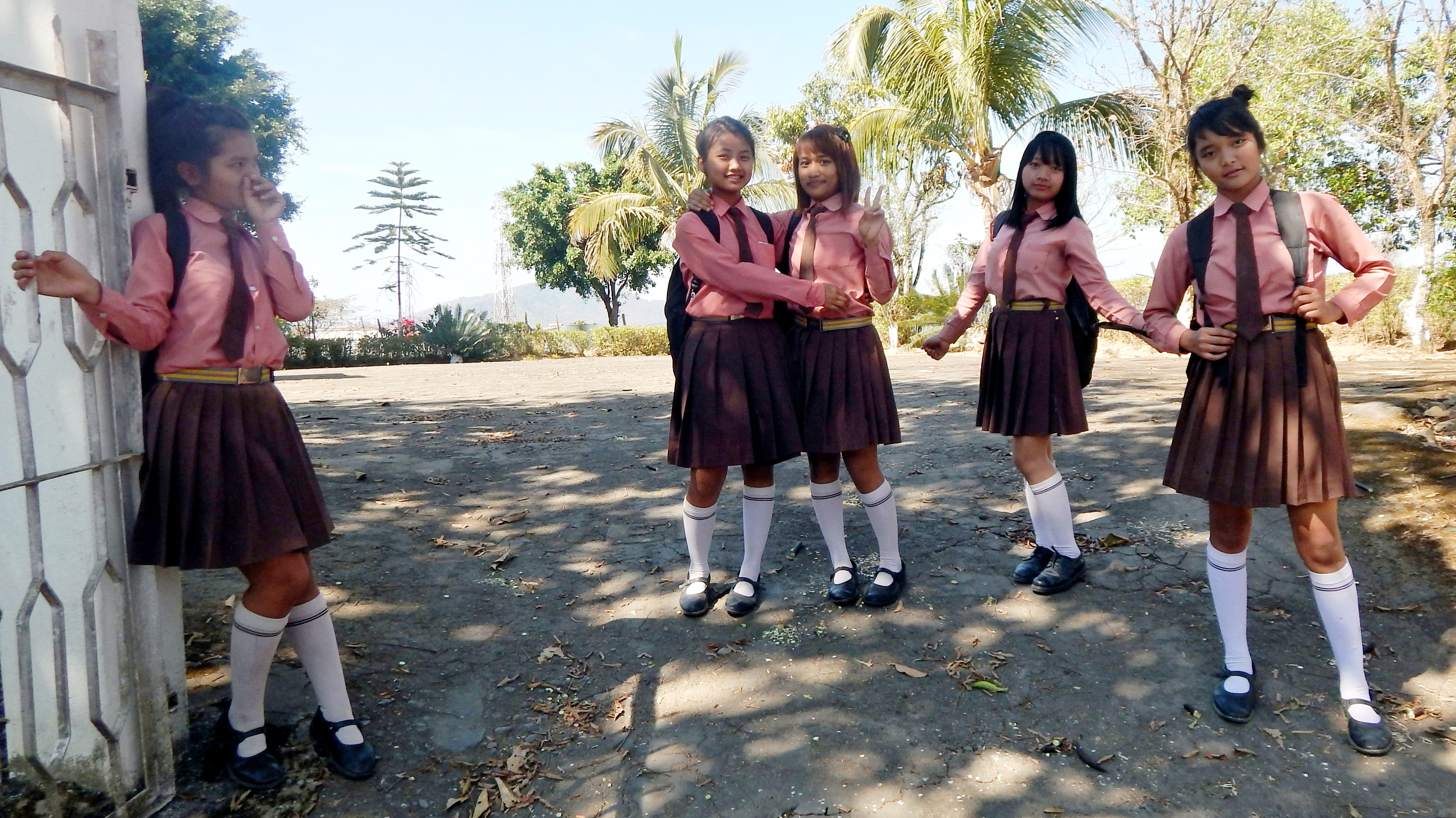
Mizo school girls

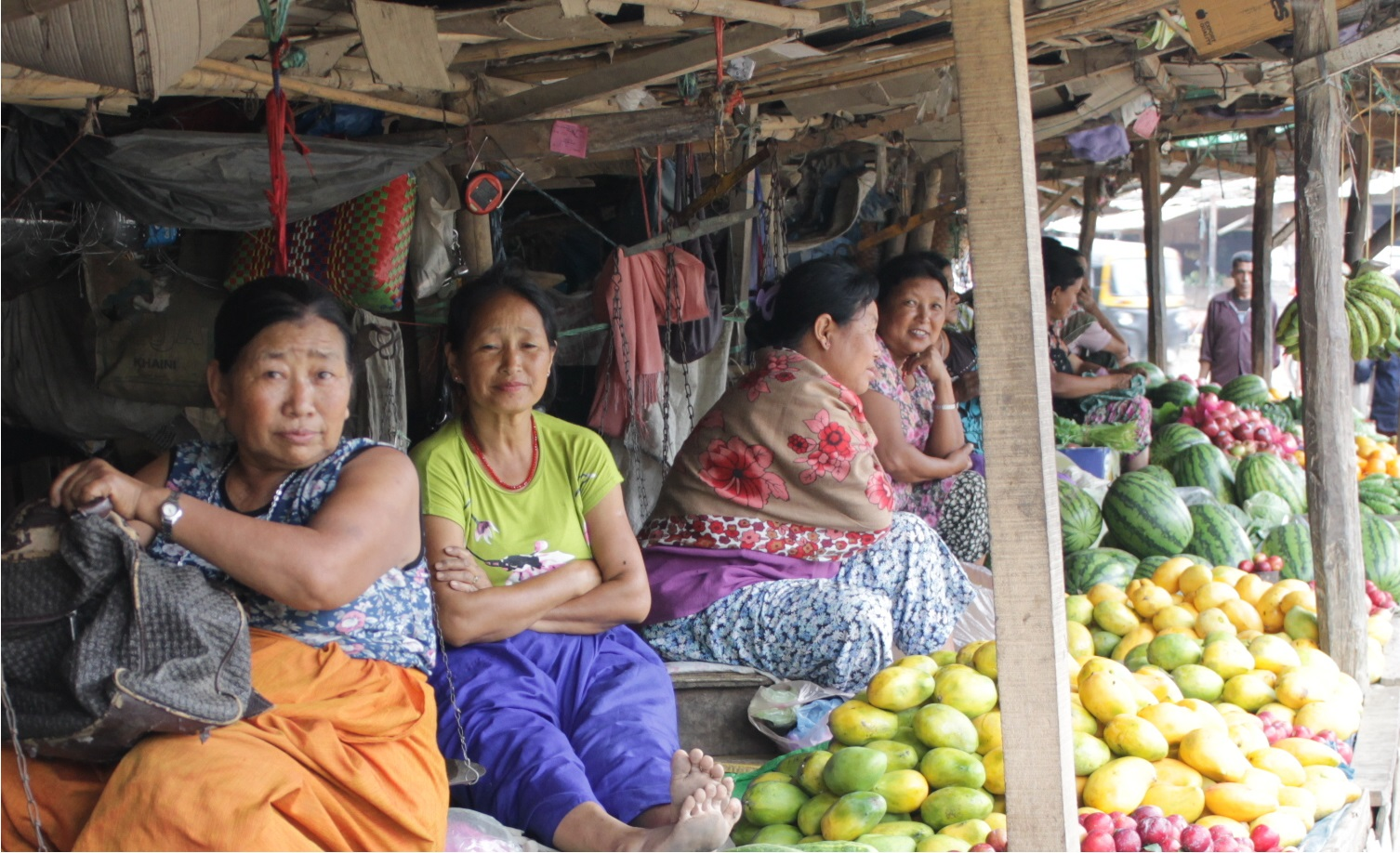
Women selling fruits in Senapati, Manipur

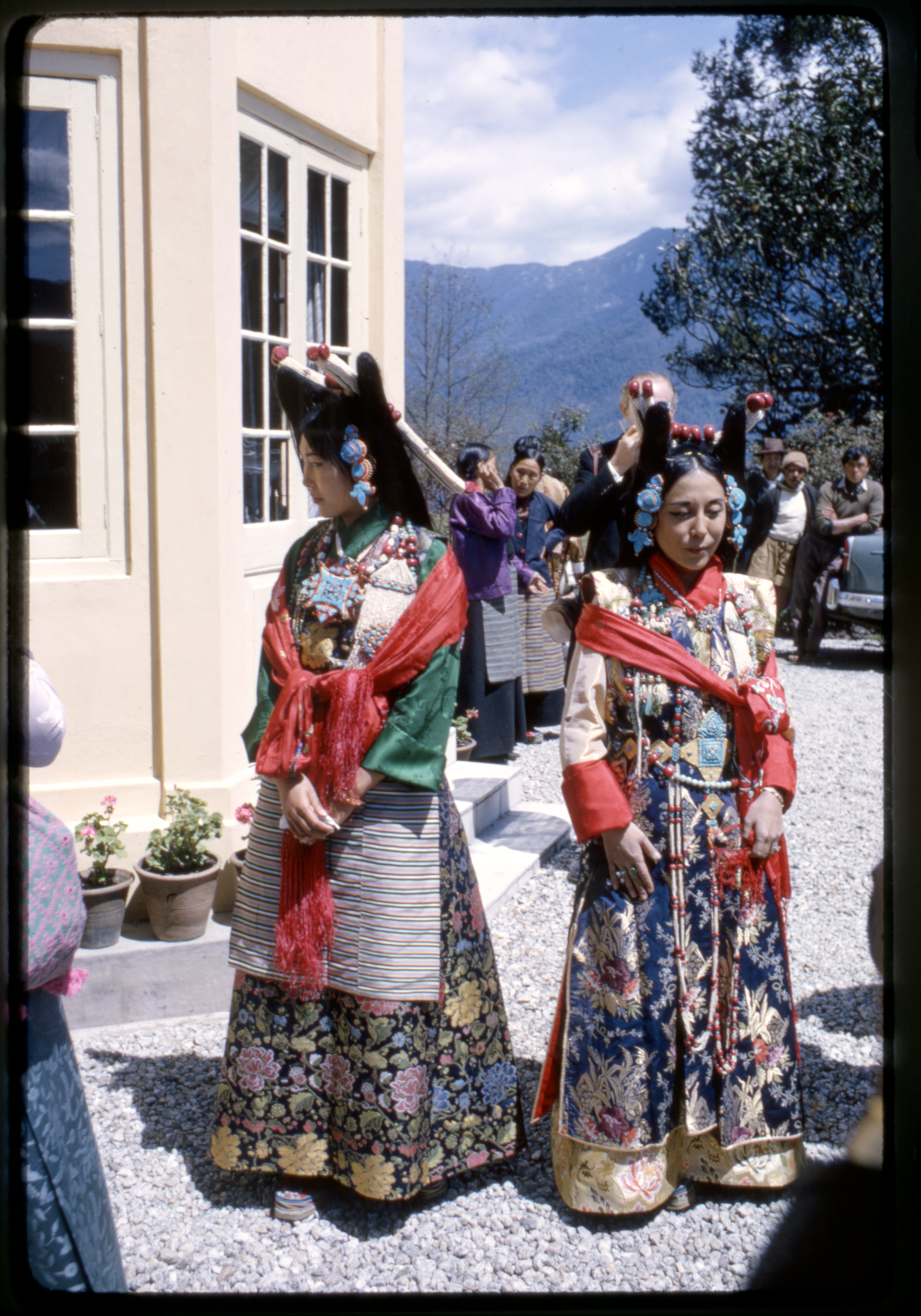
Princess of Sikkim in traditional royal dress

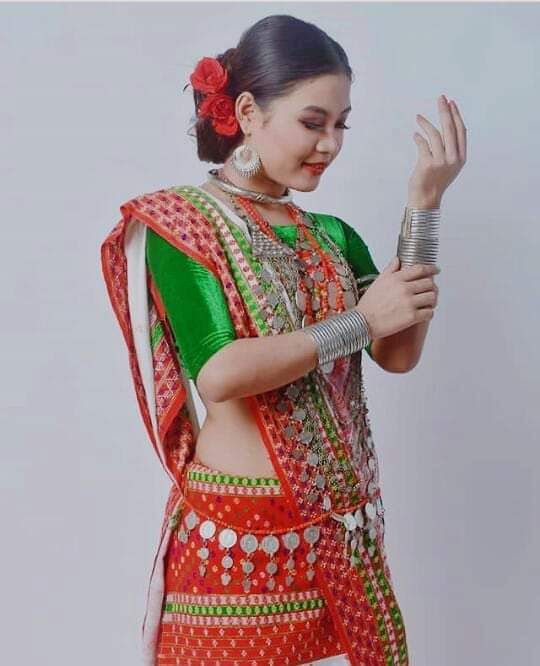
Tripuri woman in traditional attire

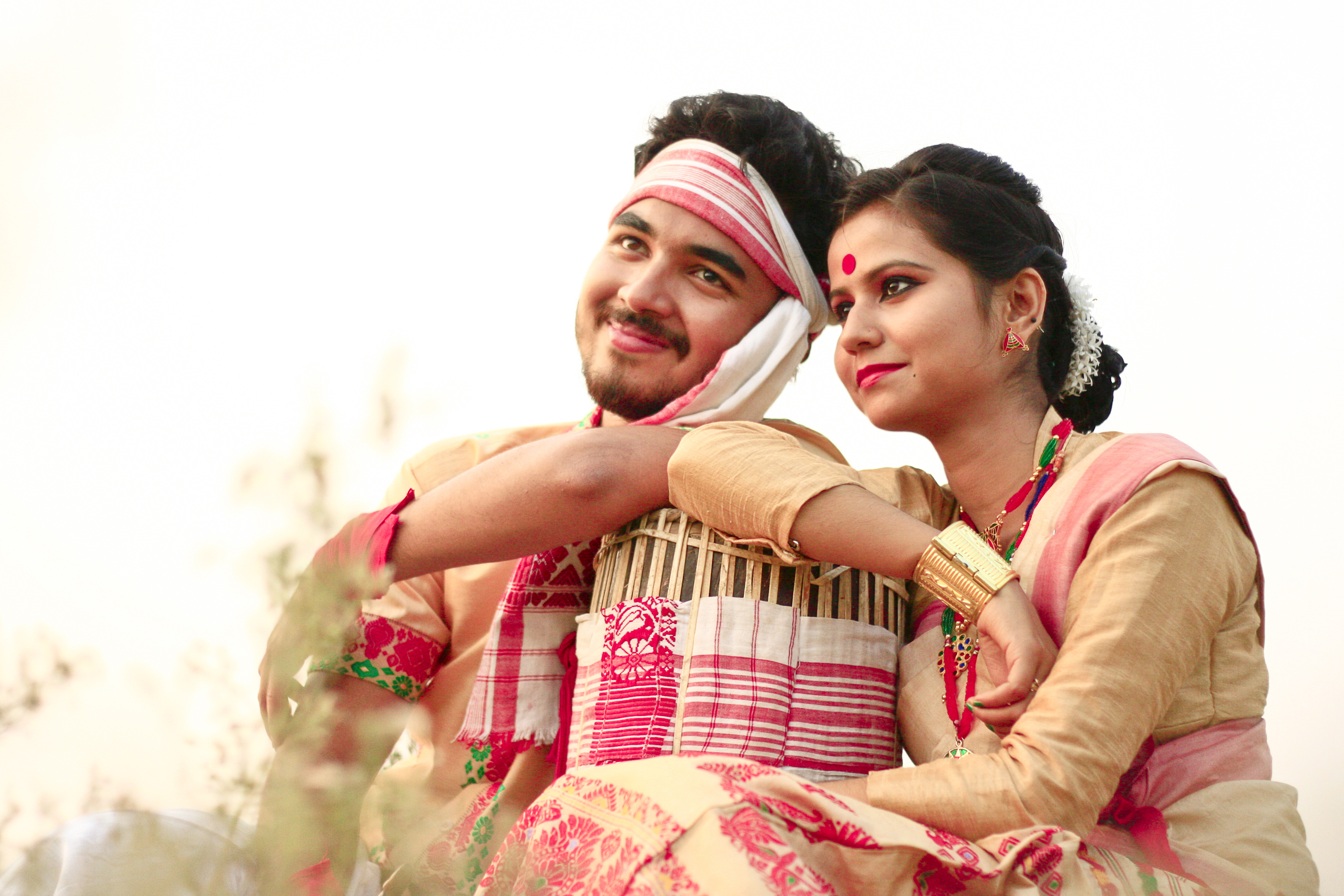
Asamiya youth in Bihu attire

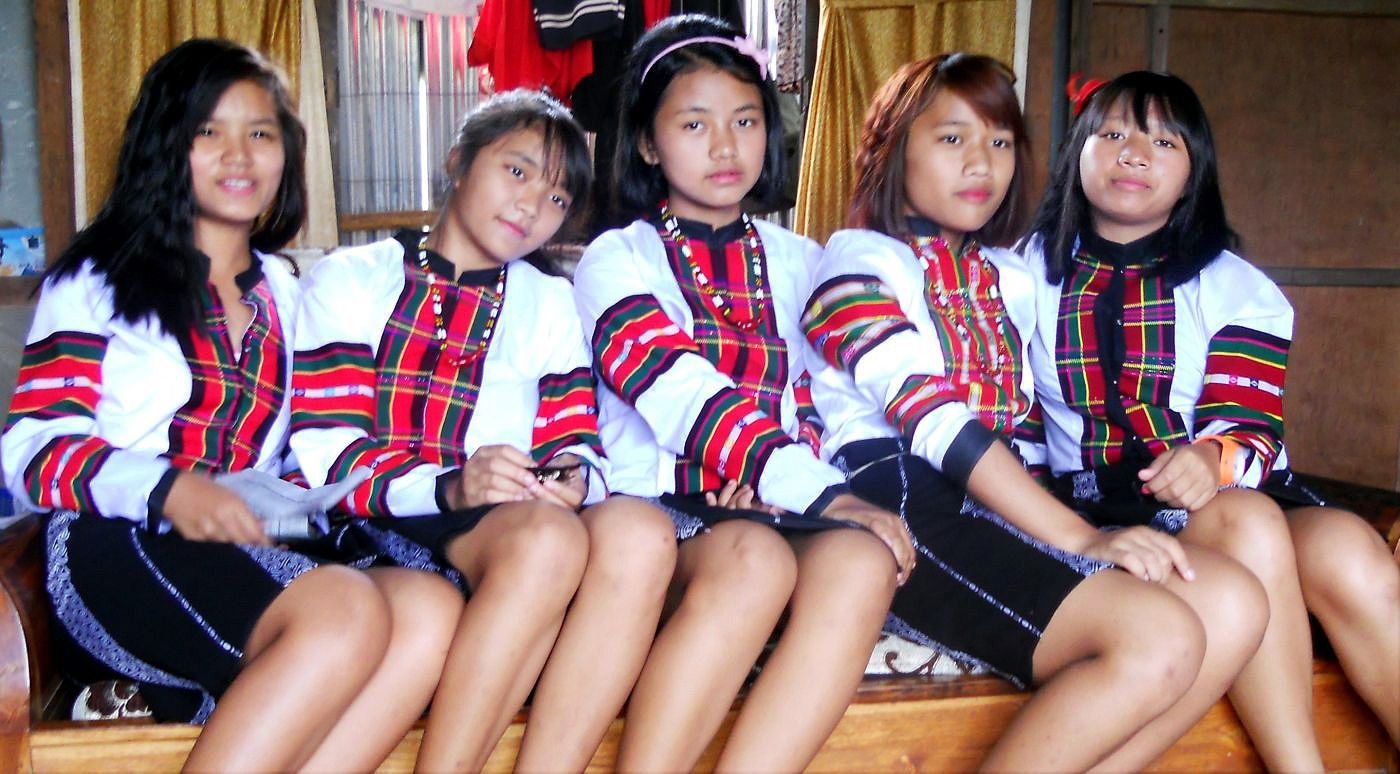
Mizo girls in Mizo traditional dress

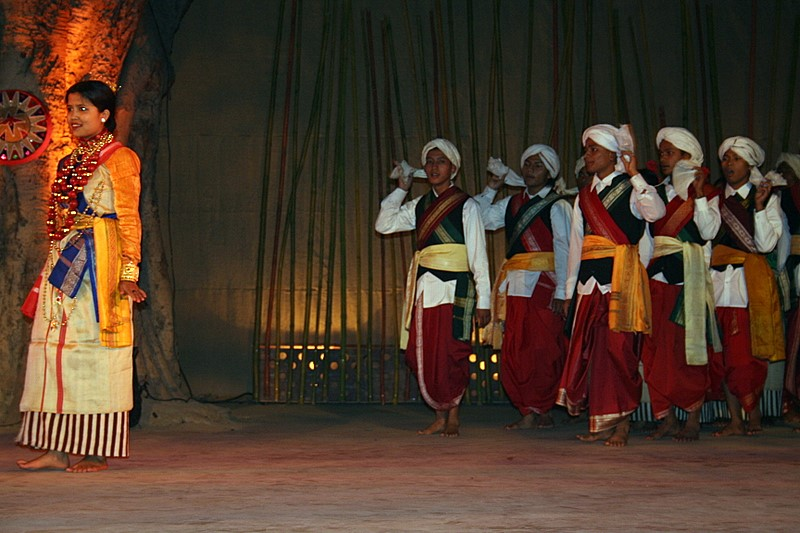
Lahoo dance of Meghalaya

== Culture ==
=== Cuisines ===
State	Staple diet	Popular dishes
Arunachal Pradesh	Rice, fish, meat, leaf vegetables	Thukpa, momo, apong (rice beer)
Assam	Rice, fish, meat, leaf vegetable	Assam tea, Pitha (rice cakes), Khar (alkali), Khar-Matidail, Ou-tenga-Maasor-Jul, Pura-Maas, Alu-Pitika, Pani-Tenga, Kharoli, Khorisa (bamboo shoot), Xukan Maasor Xukoti, Pointa-Bhaat, Tupula-Bhaat, Sunga-Sawul (rice cooked in bamboo), Kharikat Diya Maas, Kharikat Dia-Mangxo, Pati-Hanhor-Mangxo-Jul (duck stew), Lai-Xak-Gahori-Mangxo (pork with mustard greens), Kumol Sawul-Doi Jolpaan, Tamul (betel nut) – paan, rice beer (Judima, Rohi, Xaj Pani, Apong, etc.)
Manipur	Rice, fish, local vegetables	Eromba, u-morok, singju, ngari (fermented fish), kangshoi
Meghalaya	Rice, spiced meat, fish	Khasi dishes – Thungtap, Dohjem, Thungrumbai, Jadoh, ki kpu, Garo dishes – kappa, brenga, so•tepa, wa•tepa, pura, minil, na•kam (dried fish), bamboo shoot
Mizoram	Rice, fish, meat	Bai, bekang (fermented soya beans), sa-um (fermented pork), sawhchiar
Nagaland	Rice, meat, stewed or steamed vegetables	fermented bamboo shoot, smoked pork and beef, axone, galho, bhut jolokia
Sikkim	Rice, meat, dairy products	Thukpa, momo, sha Phaley, gundruk, sinki, sel roti
Tripura	Rice, meat, vegetables	Maidul (rice ball), Awang bangwi, Awang sokrang, Chakhūi, Gudok, Mosodeng, Awandru, Mūkhūi, Hangjak, Yikjak, Wahan mosodeng, Muiya (bamboo shoot), Berma Bwtwi (fermented fish)

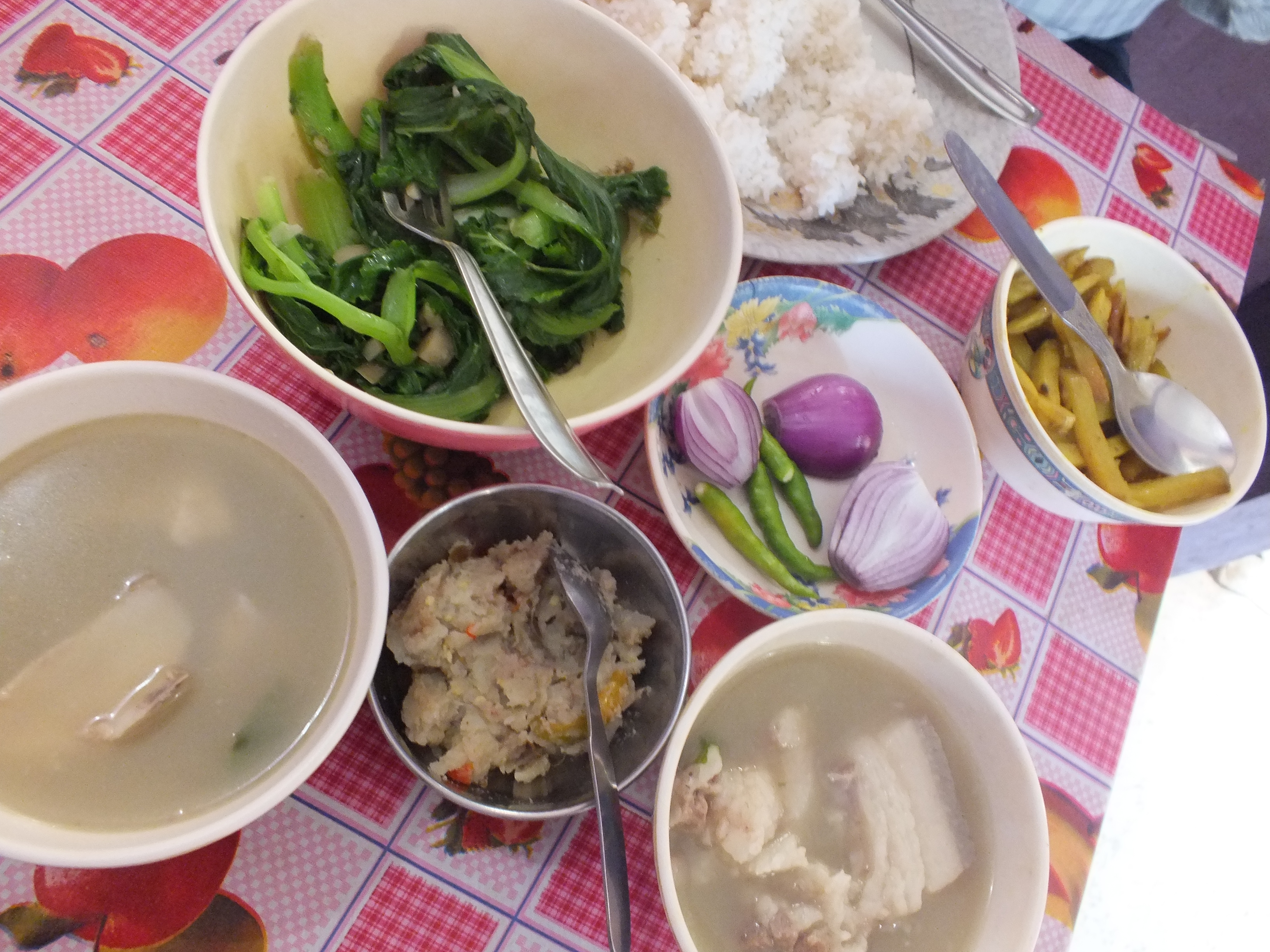
Naga meal

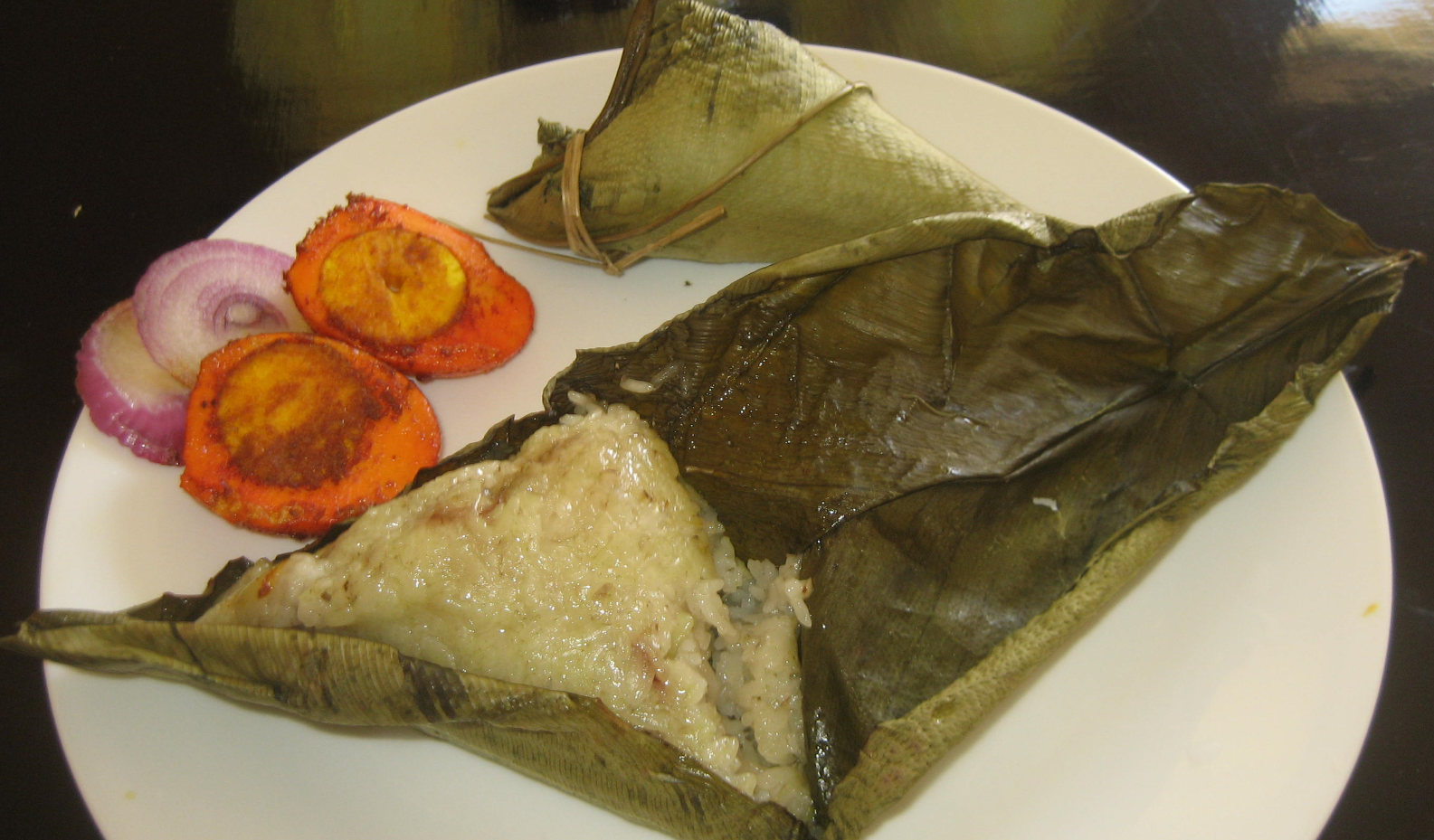
Bangwi - Tripuri food of Tripura

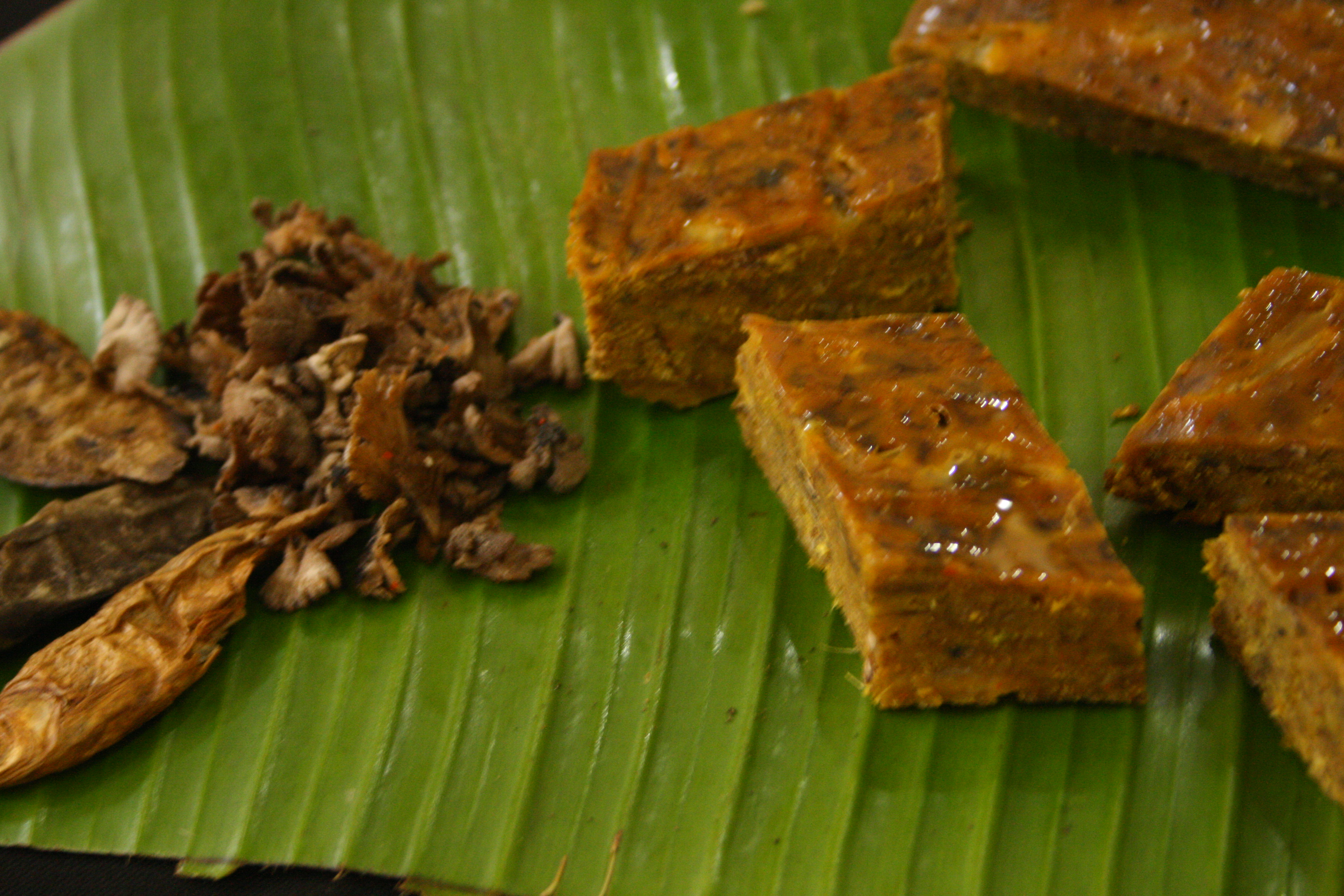
Paknam (Manipur)

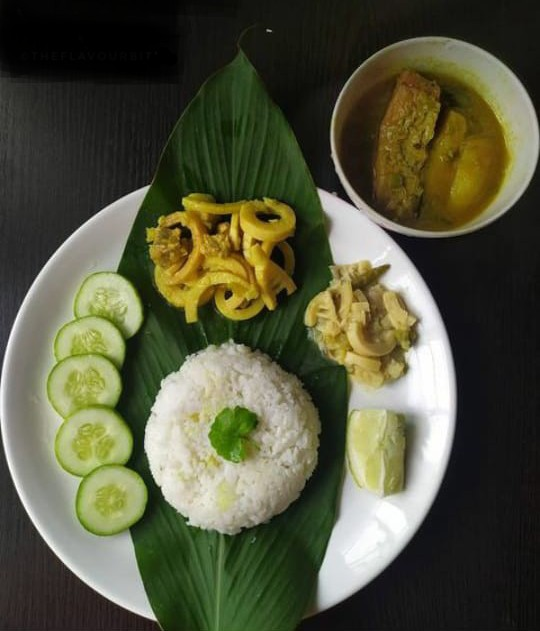
Basic Tripuri lunch thali

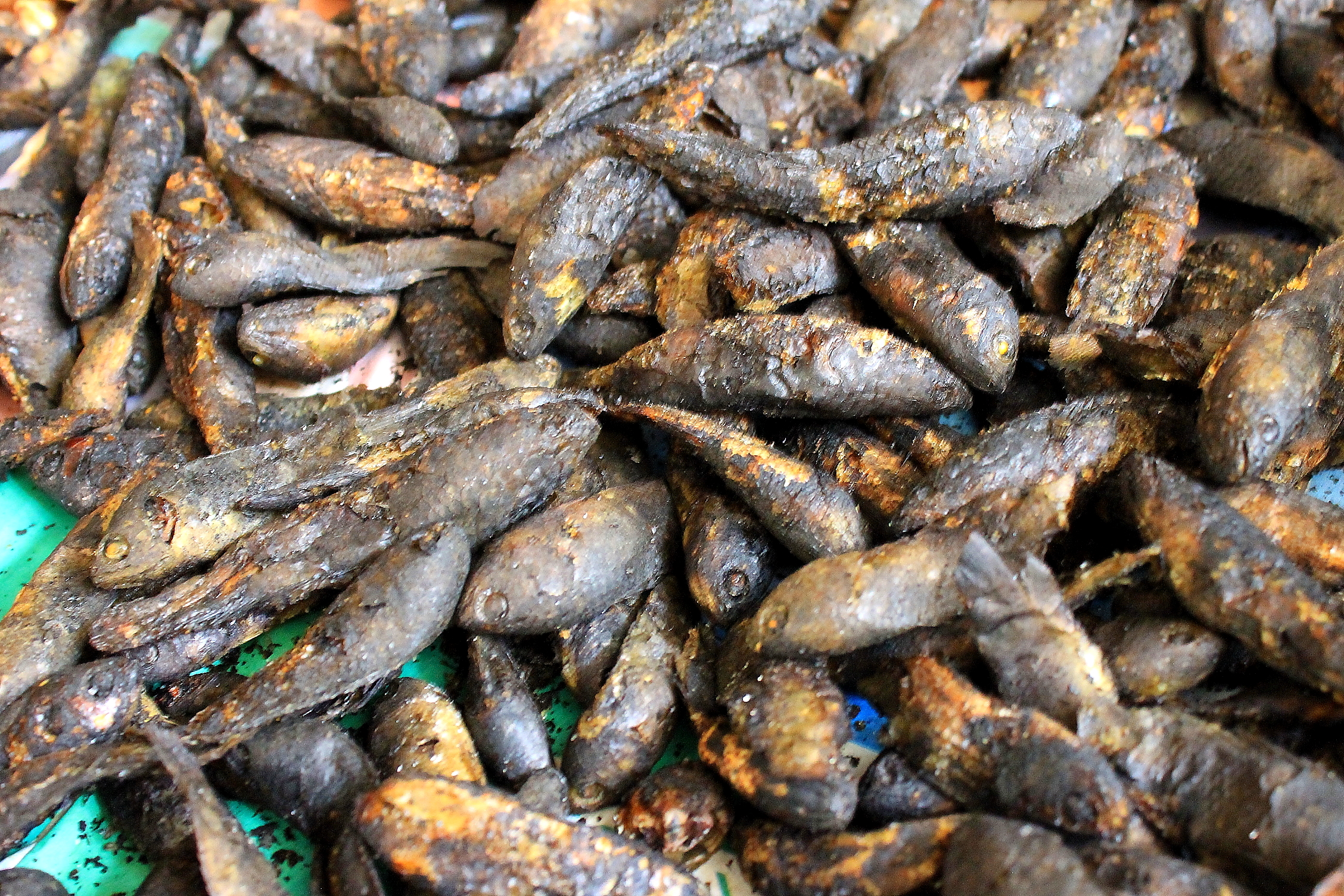
Smoked freshwater fish (Manipur)

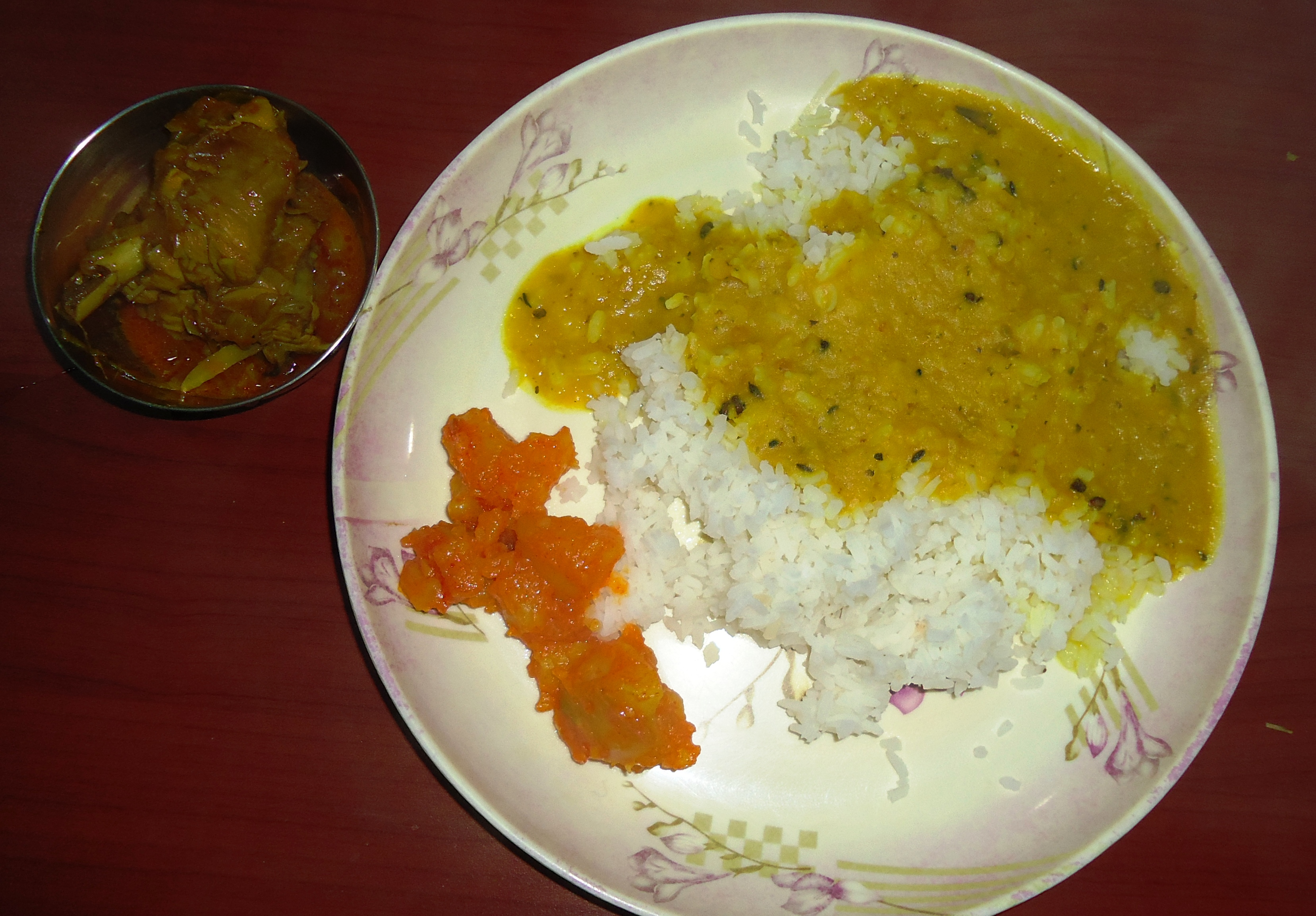
North Sikkim meal

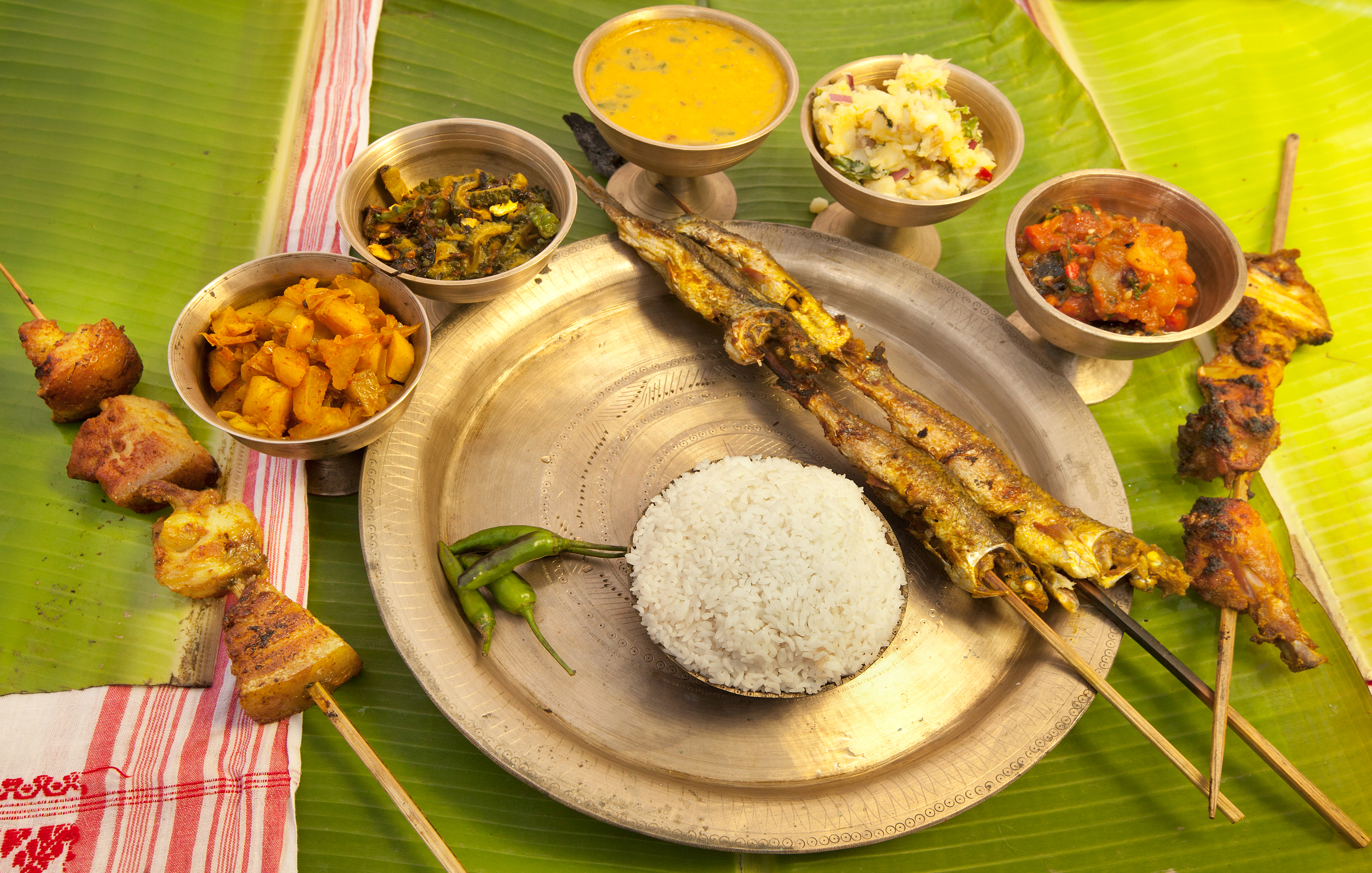
Assamese thali

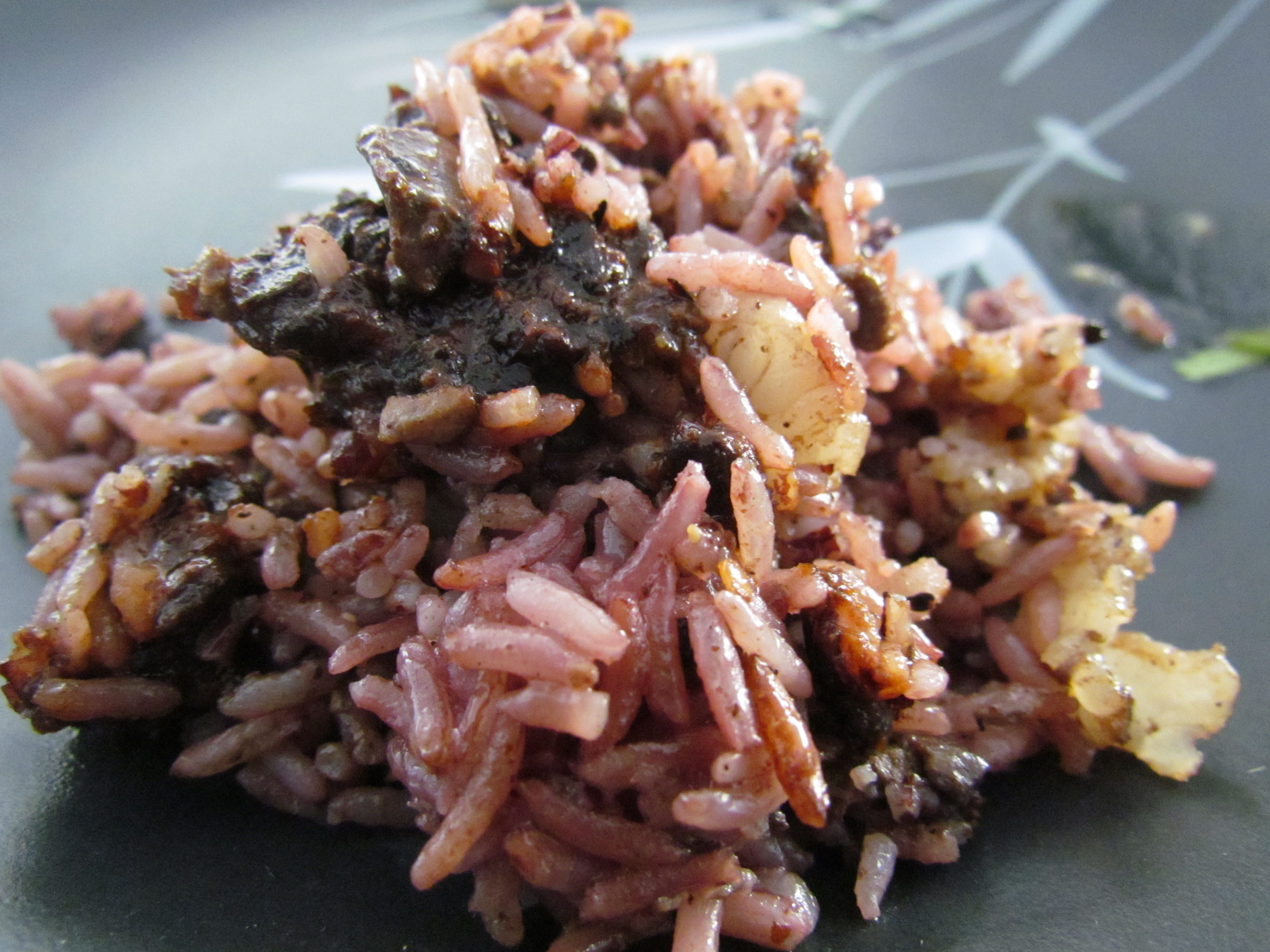
Red rice with pork (Arunachal Pradesh)

=== Arts ===
The Manipuri Raas Leela dance (from Manipur) and the Sattriya (from Assam) have been included in the category of the "Classical Dances of India", as officially recognised by both the Sangeet Natak Akademi and the Ministry of Culture (India). Besides these, all tribes in Northeast India have their own folk dances associated with their religion and festivals. Tribal heritage in the region includes hunting, land cultivation and indigenous crafts. Each community has its own traditional attire.

All states in Northeast India share the handicrafts of bamboo and cane, wood carving, making traditional weapons and musical instruments, pottery and handloom weaving. Traditional tribal attires are made of thick fabrics primarily with cotton. Assam silk is an established industry in the region.

State	Traditional performing arts	Traditional visual arts	Traditional crafts
Arunachal Pradesh	Wancho dances, Idu Mishmi dance, Digaru Mishmi Buiya dance, Khampti dance, Ponung dance, Sadinuktso		Cane and bamboo, cotton and wool weaving, wood carving, blacksmithy (hand tools, weapons, ornaments, dishes, sacred bells and smoking pipes)
Assam	Sattriya, Bagurumba, Bihu dance, Bhaona (For more see Music of Assam)	Hastividyarnava (For more see Painting of Assam and Arts of Assam)	Cane and bamboo, bell metal and brass, silk, toys, and mask making, pottery and terracotta, jewellery, musical instruments making, boat making, paints.
Manipur	Manipuri dance (Ras Lila), Kartal Cholom, Manjira Cholom, Khubak Eshei, Pung Cholom, Lai-Haraoba		Cotton textile, bamboo crafts (hats, baskets), pottery
Meghalaya	Nongkrem, Shad suk, Behdienkhlam, Wangala, Lahoo dance (For more see Music of Meghalaya)		Making hand tools and weapons, musical instruments (drums), cane and bamboo work, weaving traditional attires, jewellery making (gold, coral, glass), wall engravings, wood carving
Mizoram	Cheraw, Khual Lam, Chheih Lam, Chai Lam, Rallu Lam, Sarlamkai/Solakia, Par Lam, Sakei Lu Lam (For more see Music of Mizoram), Bizhu Dance		Traditional hand tools, weapons and textile work, bamboo and cane handicrafts
Nagaland	Zeliang dance, war dance, Nruirolians (cock dance) (For more see Music of Nagaland)		Cane and bamboo crafts, traditional hand tools, weapons and textile work, wood carving, pottery, ornaments for traditional attire, musical instruments (drum and trumpet)
Sikkim	Chu Faat dance, Lu Khangthamo, Gha To Kito, Rechungma, Maruni, Tamang Selo, Singhi Chaam, Yak Chaam, Khukuri dance, Rumtek Chaam (mask dance) Chyabrung (See also Music of Sikkim)	Thangka (showcasing Buddhist teachings on cotton canvas using vegetable dyes)	Handmade paper, carpet making, woollen textile, wood carving
Tripura	Tripuri dances, Mamita dance, Goria dance, Lebang dance, Mosak sulmani dance, Hojagiri dance, Bizhu dance, Wangala, Hai-hak dance, Sangrai dance, Owa dance	Rock curbings of different gods and goddesses	Cane and bamboo, traditional cotton textiles, weaving and handloom, moluwa /sitalpati(mat making), wood carving, string and wind instruments

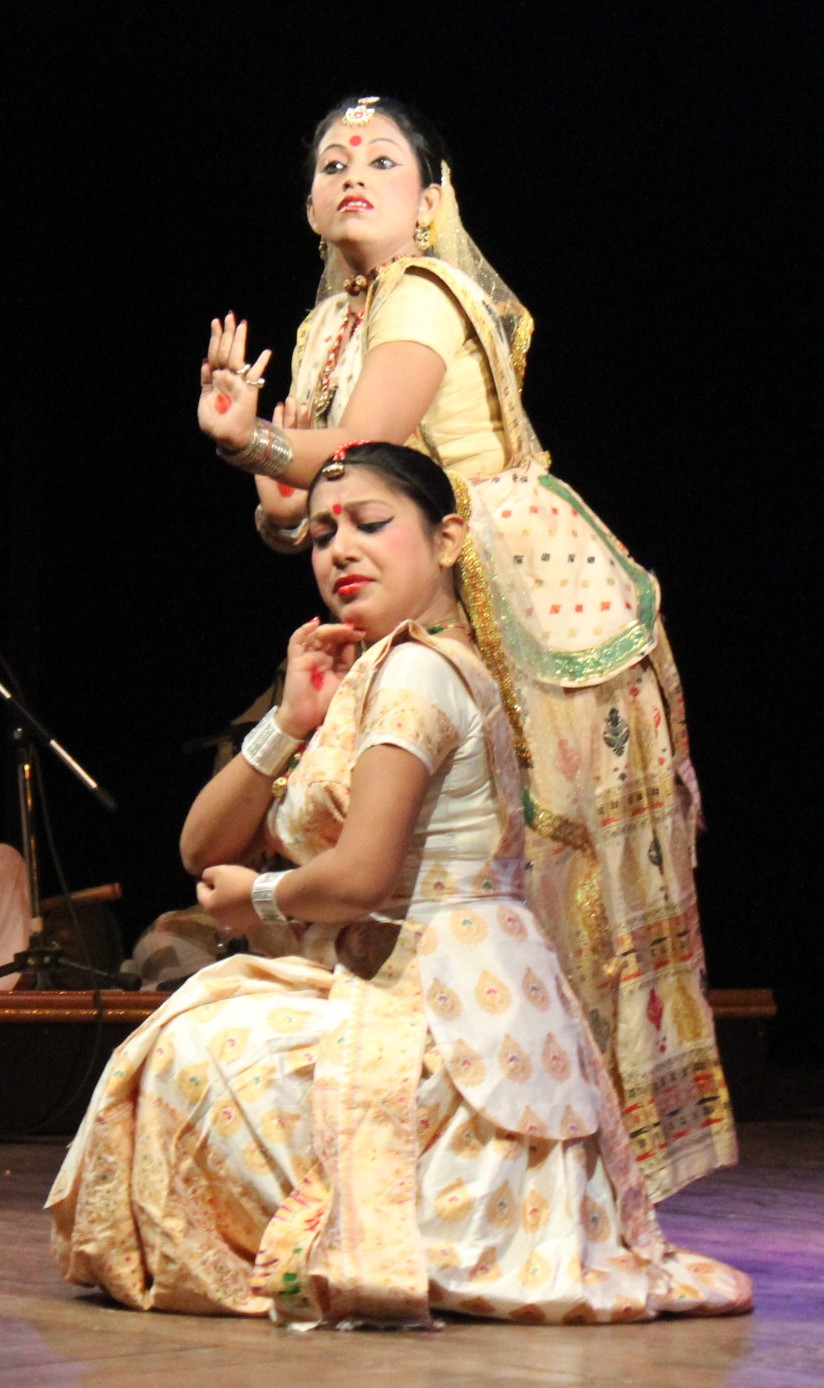
Sattriya dance (Assam)

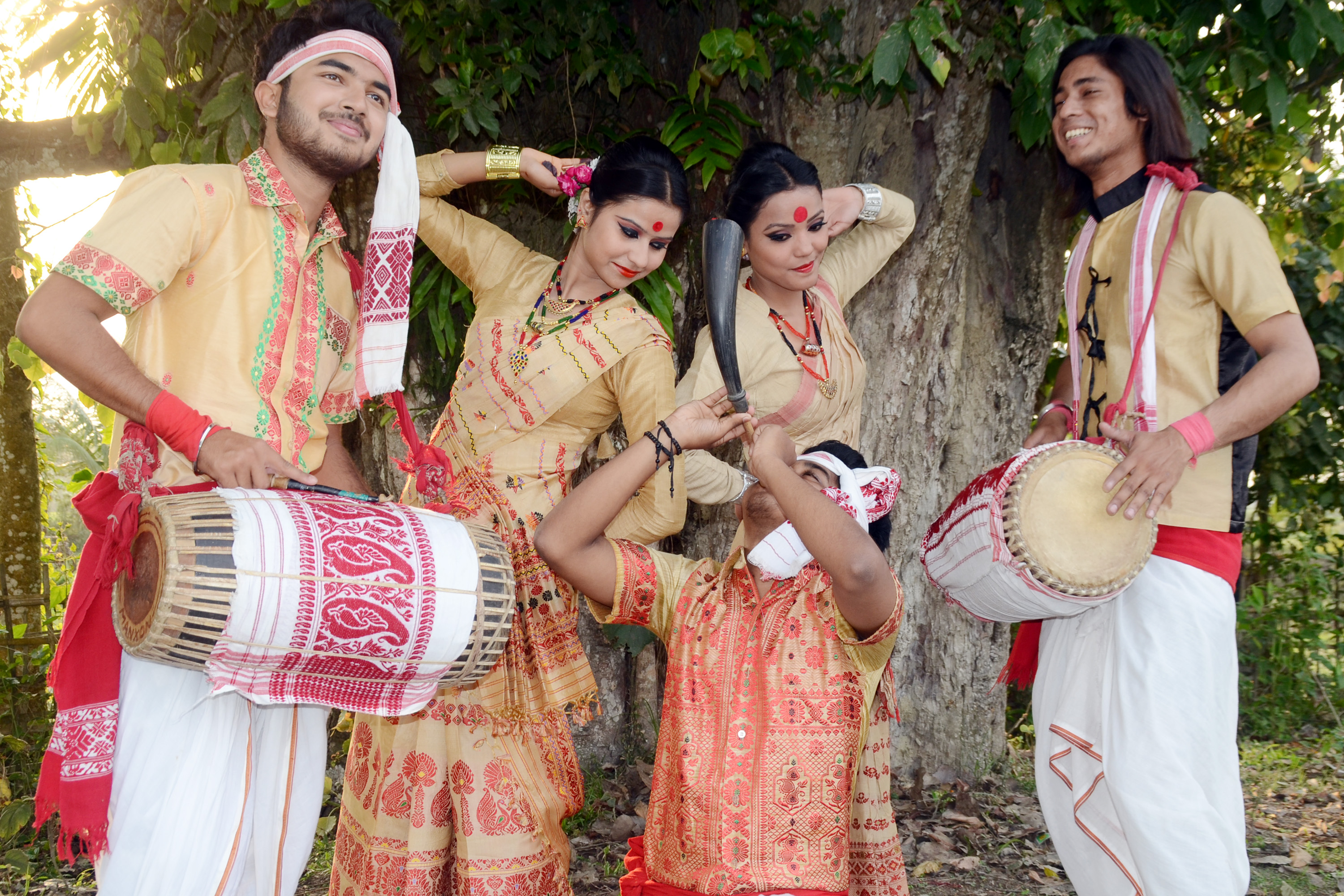
Assamese youths performing Bihu dance.

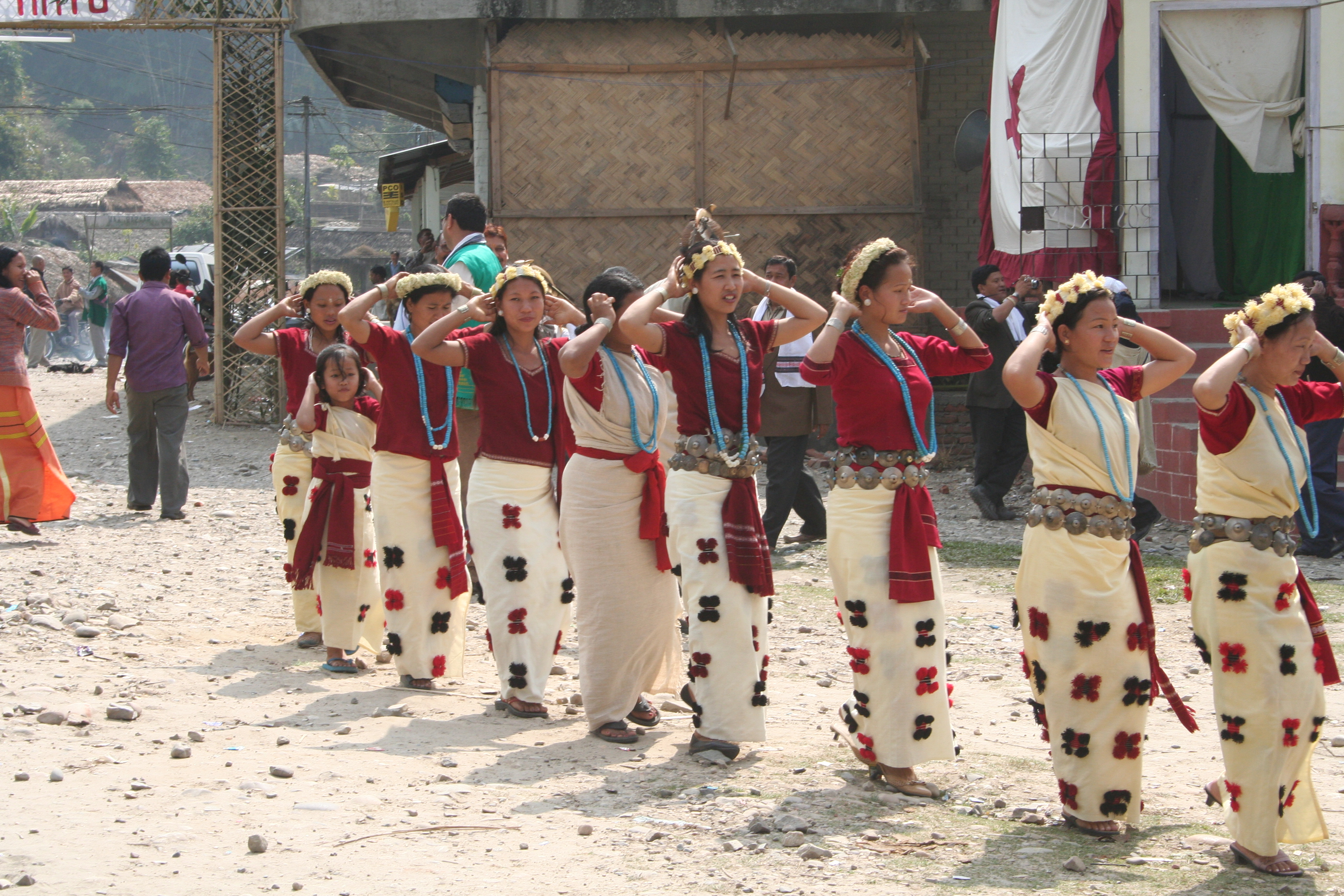
Nyokum festival of Nyishi tribe (Arunachal Pradesh)

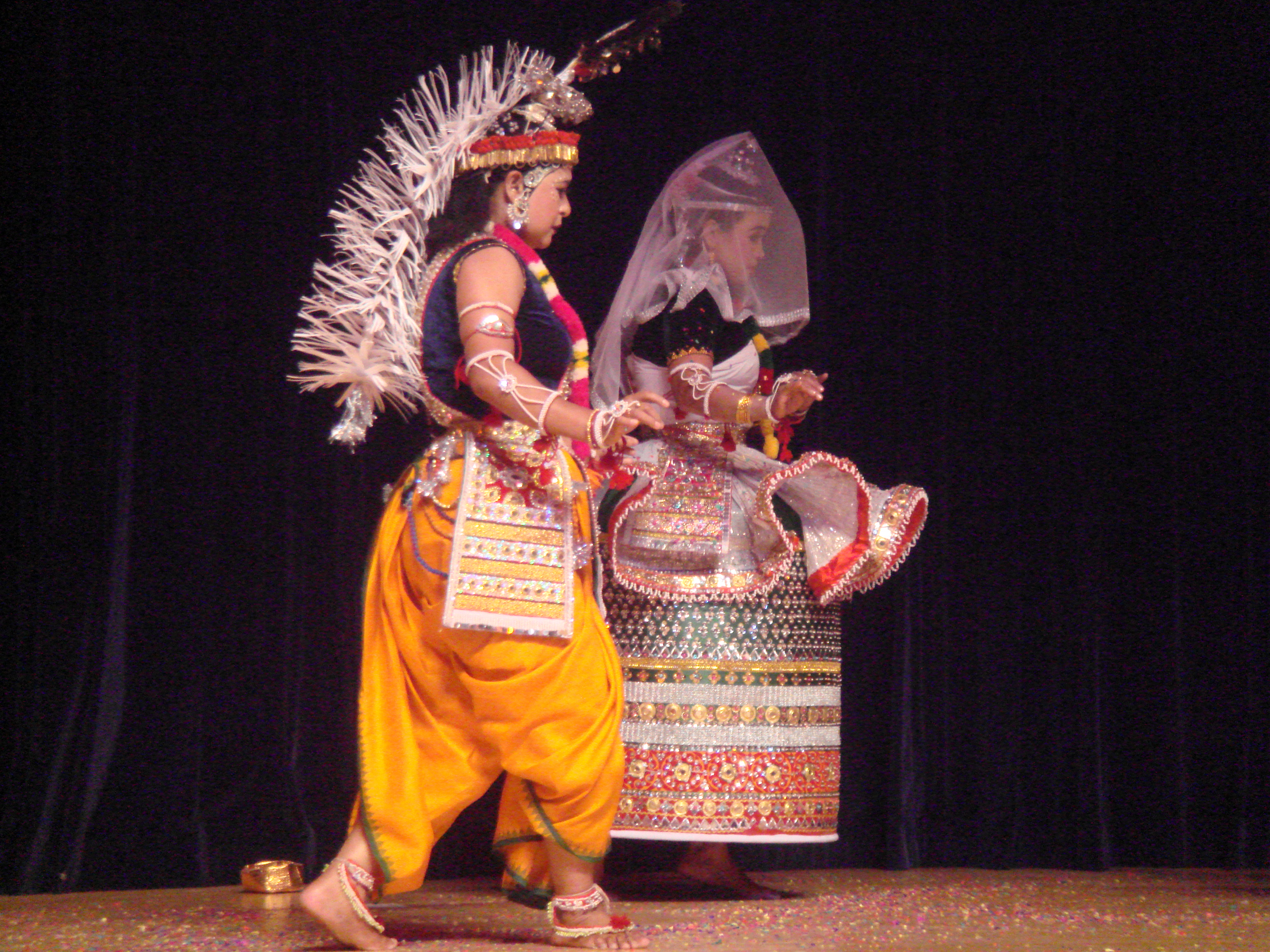
Manipuri dance

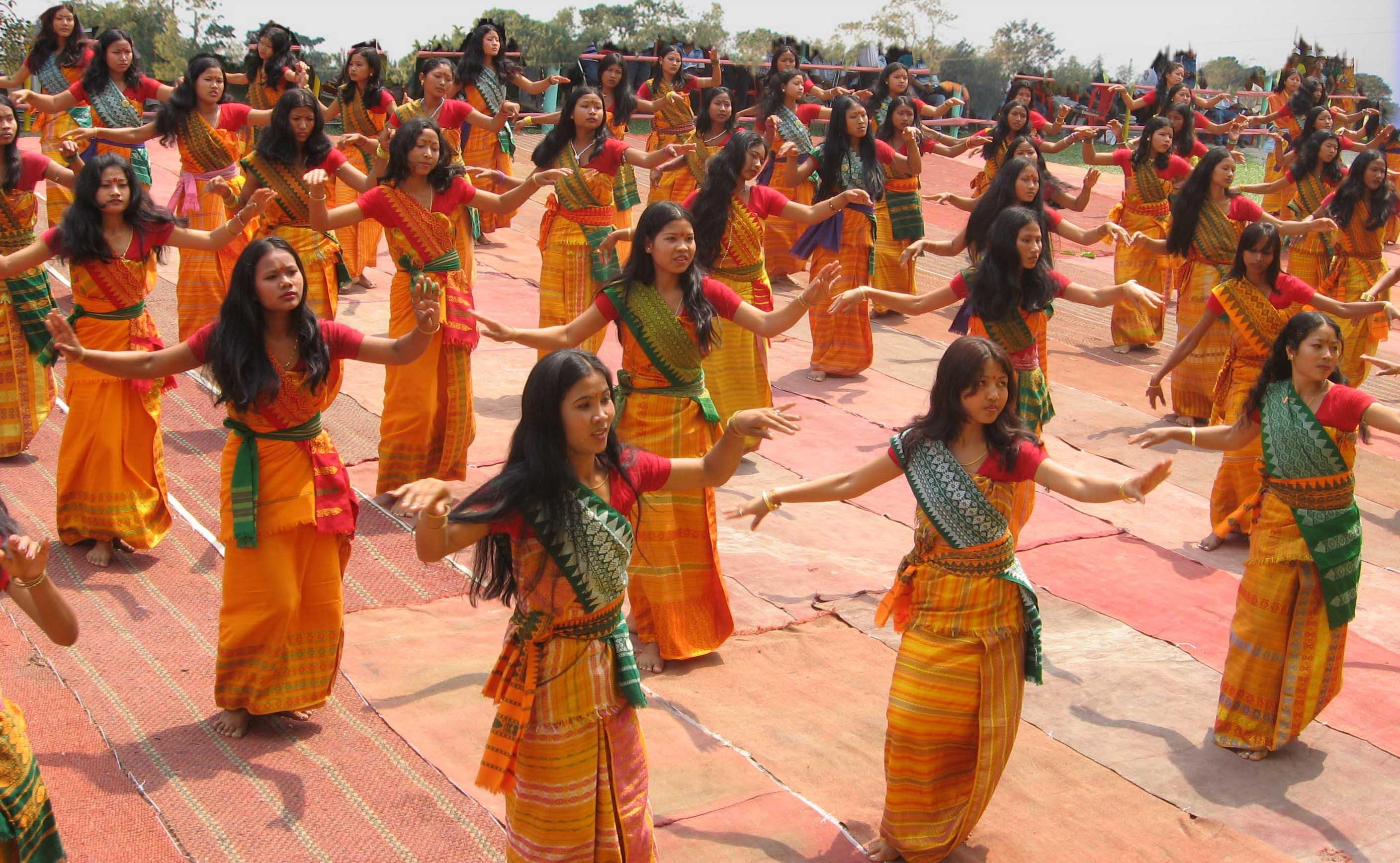
Bagurumba dance of Bodo tribe (Assam)

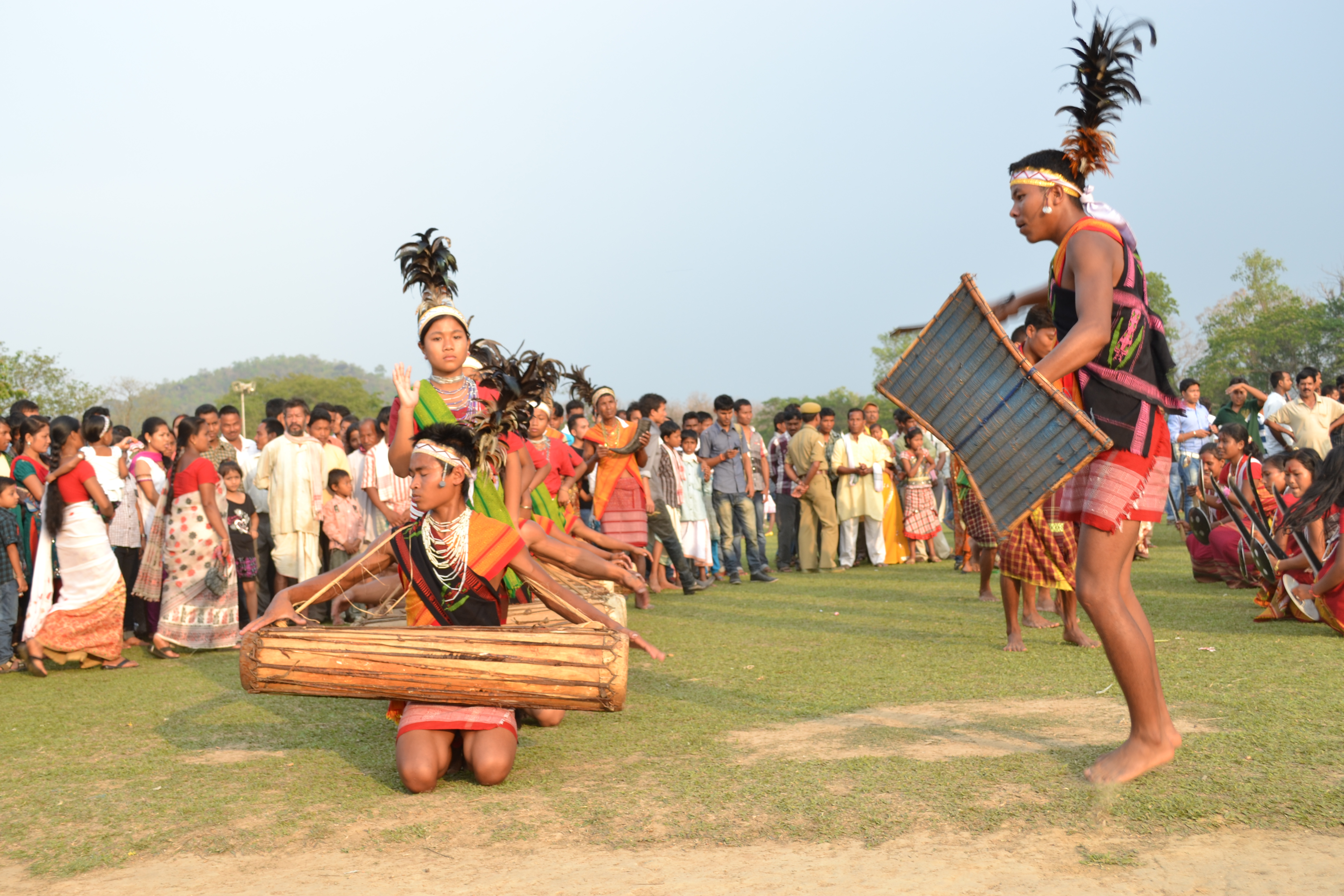
Wangala dance of Garo tribe (Assam, Meghalaya)

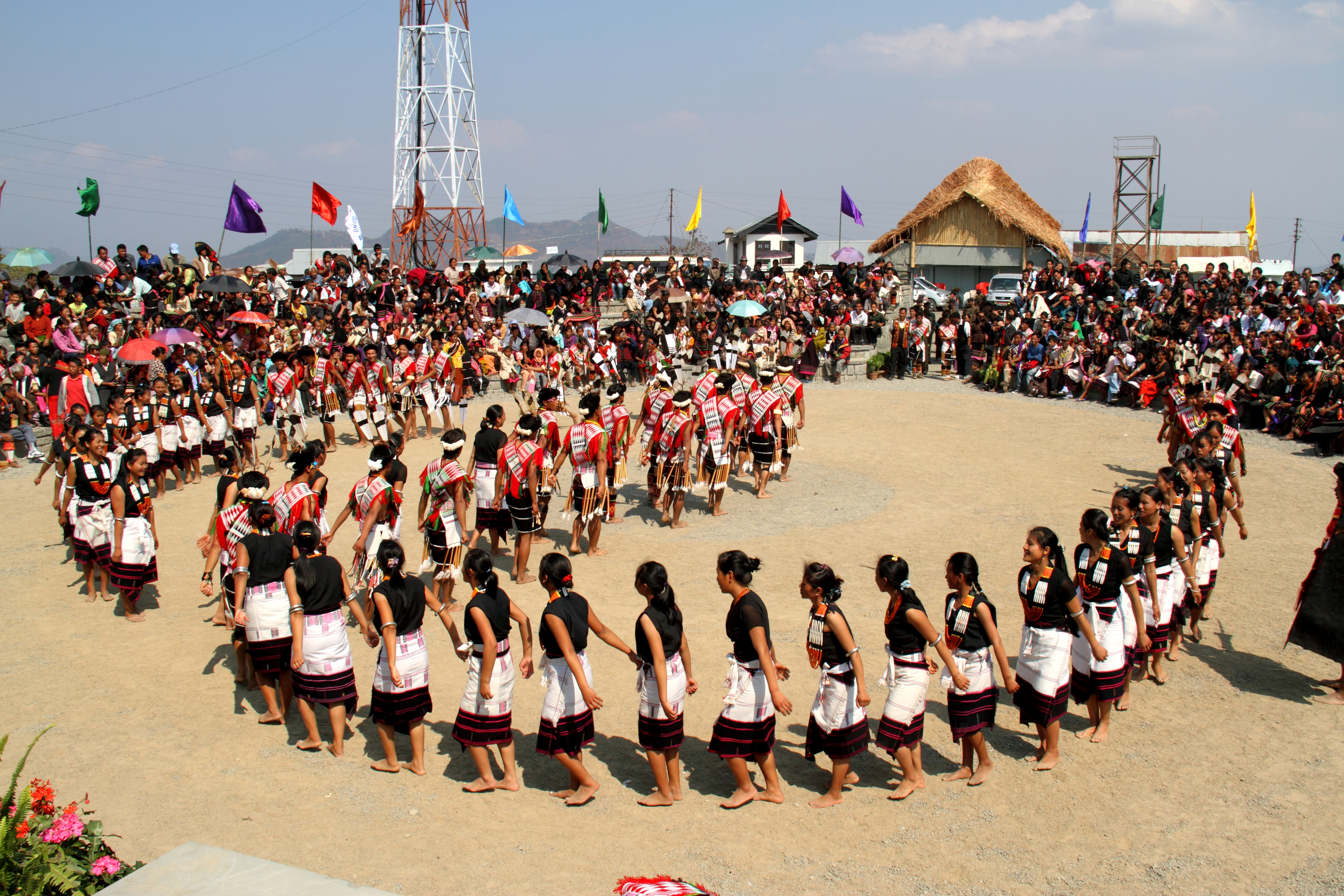
Dance of Angami tribe (Nagaland)

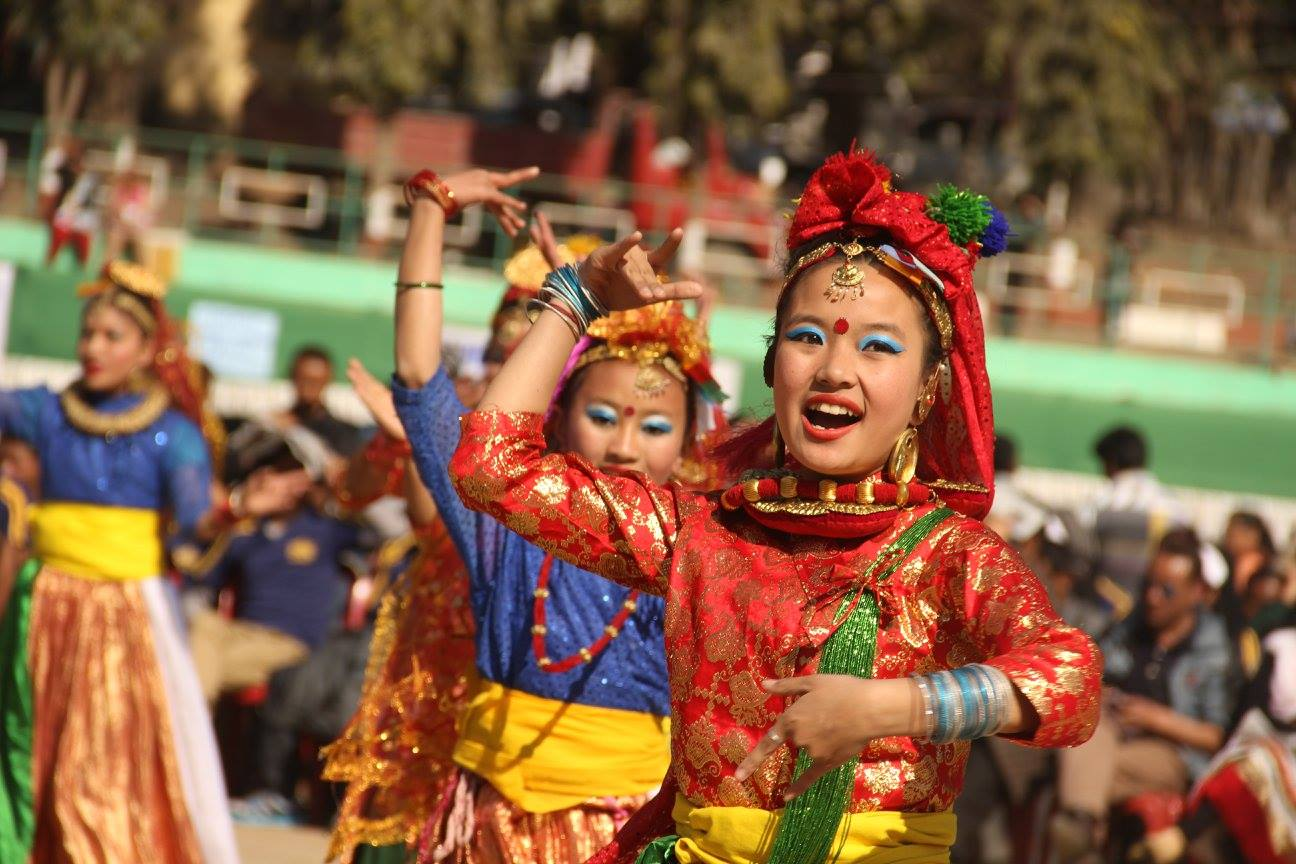
Students performing traditional dance at Jorethang (Sikkim)

=== Music ===
Northeast India has many musical genres, and each community has its own folk-music heritage. The Assamese singer-composer Bhupen Hazarika gained national and international recognition for his work. Another singer from Assam, Pratima Barua Pandey, is a folk singer. Zubeen Garg, Papon and Anurag Saikia are other singers and musicians from Assam. The Tangkhul Naga folk singer Rewben Mashangva, from Ukhrul, draws on the music of Bob Dylan and Bob Marley. The band Tetseo Sisters, from Nagaland, is known for its original music. The younger generation has increasingly taken up Western music. The region has had increased musical activity in the 21st century.

=== Literature ===
Many of the Northeast Indian indigenous communities have an ancient heritage of folktales which tell the tale of their origin, rituals, beliefs and so on. These tales are transmitted from one generation to another in oral form. However, Assam, Tripura and Manipur have some ancient written texts. These states were mentioned in the Hindu epic Mahabharata. The Saptakanda Ramayana in Assamese by Madhava Kandali is considered the first translation of the Sanskrit Ramayana into a modern Indo-Aryan Language. Karbi Ramayana bears witness to the old heritage of written literature in Assam.

Two writers from the Northeast, Birendra Kumar Bhattacharya and Mamoni Raisom Goswami, have been awarded Jnanpith, the highest literary award in India. Hence, Birendra Kumar Bhattacharya was the first Assamese writer and from the Northeast India to receive Jnanpith Award for his Assamese novel Mrityunjay (1979). Mamoni Raisom Goswami was awarded the Jnanpith Award in the year 2000. Nagen Saikia is the first writer from Assam and the Northeast India, to have been conferred the Sahitya Akademi Fellowship by the Sahitya Akademi. Some of the notable writers of Northeast Literature are--(from Assam) Lakshminath Bezbaroa, Homen Borgohain, Birendra Kumar Bhattacharya, Harekrishna Deka, Rongbong Terang, Nilmani Phukan, Indira Goswami, Hiren Bhattacharyya, Mitra Phukan, Jahnavi Barua, Dhruba Hazarika, Rita Chowdhury; (from Arunachal Pradesh) Mamang Dai; (from Manipur) Robin S Ngangom, Ratan Thiyam; (from Meghalaya) Paul Lyngdoh; (from Nagaland) Temsula Ao, Easterine Kire; (from Sikkim) Rajendra Bhandari.

Temsula Ao is the first writer from Northeast India to be awarded the Sahitya Akademi Award (2013) in the Indian English Literature category for her collection of short stories, Laburnum for My Head, and Padma Shri (2007). Easterine Kire is the first English-language novelist from Nagaland. She received The Hindu Literary Prize (2015) for her novel When the River Sleeps. Indira Goswami, alias Mamoni Roisom Goswami, is an Assamese writer whose novels include Moth-Eaten Howda of the Tusker, Pages Stained with Blood, The Shadow of Kamakhya and The Blue-Necked God. Mamang Dai won the Sahitya Akademi Award (2017) for her novel The Black Hill.

=== Festivals ===
Indigenous festivals in the northeast include the Ojiale festival of the Wancho people, Chhekar festival of the Sherdukpen people, Longte Yullo festival of Nishis, Solung festival of Adis, Losar festival of Monpas, Reh festival of Idu Mishmis and Dree festival of Apatani. Mamita Tripurabda(Tring festival), Buisu, Hangrai, Hojagiri, Kharchi and Garia festivals of Tripura, In Manipur popular festivals include Ningol Chakouba and the Manipur boat racing festival or the Heikru Hidongba, Chasok Tangnam festival of Limbu people.

=== Sport ===
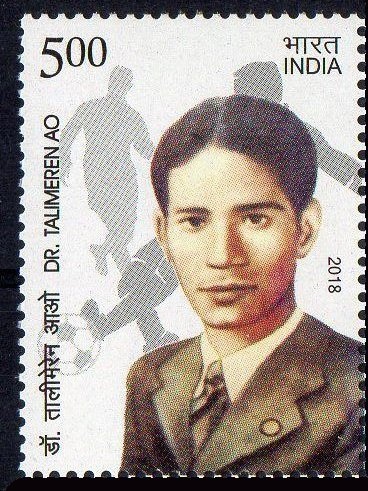
Nagaland's Talimeren Ao served as the first captain of the national football team in 1948.

Northeast India is notable for playing sports that are not very popular in the rest of India. These sports include football and a growing presence of baseball in Manipur. The region's history of warfare against invaders and hilly terrain contribute to a culture that supports physical fitness. Female athletes from the region include Mary Kom and Mirabai Chanu.

== Administration and political disputes ==
=== International border management ===
- McMahon Line and China–India border crossings patrolled by Indo-Tibetan Border Police and Special Frontier Force with China along Sikkim and Arunachal Pradesh
- India-Bangladesh border and crossings patrolled by Border Security Force along Assam, Meghalaya, Tripura and Mizoram
- India–Myanmar border, crossings patrolled by Assam Rifles and Indian Army along Arunachal Pradesh, Nagaland, Manipur and Mizoram
- India-Bhutan borders patrolled by Sashastra Seema Bal along Sikkim, Assam and Arunachal Pradesh
- India-Nepal border patrolled by Sashastra Seema Bal along Sikkim

=== Pan-state development authorities ===
- Ministry for Development of North Eastern Region (DoNER)
- North Eastern Council

=== States and sub-divisions ===
State	Code	Capital	Districts	Sub-division type	Number of subdivisions
Arunachal Pradesh	IN-AR	Itanagar	20	Circle	149
Assam	IN-AS	Dispur	35	Sub-division	78
Manipur	IN-MN	Imphal	16	Sub-division	38
Meghalaya	IN-ML	Shillong	12	Community development block	39
Mizoram	IN-MZ	Aizawl	11	Community development block	22
Nagaland	IN-NL	Kohima	16	Circle	33
Sikkim	IN-SK	Gangtok	6	Sub-division	9
Tripura	IN-TR	Agartala	8	Sub-division	23

Autonomous administrative divisions of NE India

Autonomous administrative divisions in North Eastern states
State	Autonomous division	Establishment
Assam	Bodoland Territorial Area Districts	February 2003
Assam	Dima Hasao district	February 1970
Assam	Karbi Anglong district	February 1970
Assam	Mising Autonomous Council	1995
Assam	Rabha Hasong Autonomous Council	1995
Manipur	Churachandpur Autonomous District Council	1971
Manipur	Chandel Autonomous District Council	1971
Manipur	Senapati Autonomous District Council	1971
Manipur	Sadar Hills Autonomous District Council	1971
Manipur	Tamenglong Autonomous District Council	1971
Manipur	Ukhrul Autonomous District Council	1971
Meghalaya	Garo Hills Autonomous District Council	
Meghalaya	Jaintia Hills Autonomous District Council	July 2012
Meghalaya	Khasi Hills Autonomous District Council	
Mizoram	Chakma Autonomous District Council	April 1972
Mizoram	Lai Autonomous District Council	April 1972
Mizoram	Mara Autonomous District Council	May 1971
Tripura	Tripura Tribal Areas Autonomous District Council	January 1982
Main article: Autonomous administrative divisions of India

=== Government ===
The northeastern states, having 3.8% of India's total population, are allotted 25 out of a total of 543 seats in the Lok Sabha. This is 4.6% of the total number of seats.

State	Governor	Chief minister	High Court	Chief justice
Arunachal Pradesh	Kaiwalya Trivikram Parnaik	Pema Khandu	Guwahati High Court (Itanagar Bench)	Sandeep Mehta, chief justice
Assam	Lakshman Acharya	Himanta Biswa Sarma	Guwahati High Court	Sandeep Mehta, chief justice
Manipur	Ajay Kumar Bhalla	Y. Khemchand Singh	Manipur High Court	Justice Siddharth Mridul
Meghalaya	C. H. Vijayashankar	Conrad Sangma	Meghalaya High Court	Justice Sanjib Banerjee
Mizoram	Vijay Kumar Singh	Lalduhoma	Guwahati High Court (Aizawl Bench)	Sandeep Mehta, chief justice
Nagaland	Nand Kishore Yadav	Neiphiu Rio	Guwahati High Court (Kohima Bench)	Sandeep Mehta, chief justice
Sikkim	Om Prakash Mathur	Prem Singh Tamang	Sikkim High Court	Justice Satish K. Agnihotri
Tripura	Indrasena Reddy	Manik Saha	Tripura High Court	Justice T. A. Gaur

=== 20th century separatist unrest ===
In 1947, Indian independence and partition resulted in the North East becoming a landlocked region. This exacerbated the isolation that has been recognised, but not studied. East Pakistan controlled access to the Indian Ocean. The mountainous terrain has hampered the construction of road and railways connections in the region.

Several militant groups have formed an alliance to fight against the governments of India, Bhutan, and Myanmar, and now use the term "Western Southeast Asia" (WESEA) to refer to the region. The separatist groups include the Kangleipak Communist Party (KCP), Kanglei Yawol Kanna Lup (KYKL), People's Revolutionary Party of Kangleipak (PREPAK), People's Revolutionary Party of Kangleipak-Pro (PREPAK-Pro), Revolutionary People's Front (RPF), People's Liberation Army of Manipur (PLA), United National Liberation Front (UNLF) of Manipur, Hynniewtrep National Liberation Council (HNLC) of Meghalaya, Kamatapur Liberation Organization (KLO), which operates in Assam and North Bengal, National Democratic Front of Bodoland and ULFA of Assam, and the National Liberation Front of Tripura (NLFT).

== Economy ==
The Ministry of Development of North Eastern Region (MDoNER) is the deciding body under Government of India for socio-economic development in the region. The North Eastern Council under MDoNER serves as the regional governing body for Northeast India. The North Eastern Development Finance Corporation Ltd. (NEDFi) is a public limited company providing assistance to micro, small, medium and large enterprises within the northeastern region (NER). Other organisations under MDoNER include North Eastern Regional Agricultural Marketing Corporation Limited (NERAMAC), Sikkim Mining Corporation Limited (SMC) and North Eastern Handlooms and Handicrafts Development Corporation (NEHHDC).

=== List of NE states by GSDP, 2026-27 ===
Rank	State	GSDP in (₹)	GSDP in ($)	GSDP per capita in (₹)	GSDP per capita in ($)
1	Assam	₹8,71,451 crore	$90 Billion	₹2,03,760	$2,254
2	Tripura	₹1,00,795 crore	$10 Billion	₹2,13,376	$2,360
3	Meghalaya	₹76,320 crore	$7.9 Billion	₹1,72,929	$1,913
4	Manipur	₹68,823 crore	$7.1 Billion	₹1,53,993	$1,703
5	Sikkim	₹62,962 crore	$6.5 Billion	₹7,63,649	$8,447
6	Nagaland	₹48,500 crore	$5.0 Billion	₹1,92,282	$2,127
7	Mizoram	₹43,817 crore	$4.6 Billion	₹2,87,097	$3,176
8	Arunachal Pradesh	₹41,341 crore	$4.3 Billion	₹3,09,994	$3,429

=== Industries ===
==== Agriculture ====
The economy is agrarian. Little land is available for settled agriculture. Along with settled agriculture, jhum (slash-and-burn) cultivation is still practised by a few indigenous groups of people. The inaccessible terrain and internal disturbances have made rapid industrialisation difficult in the region.

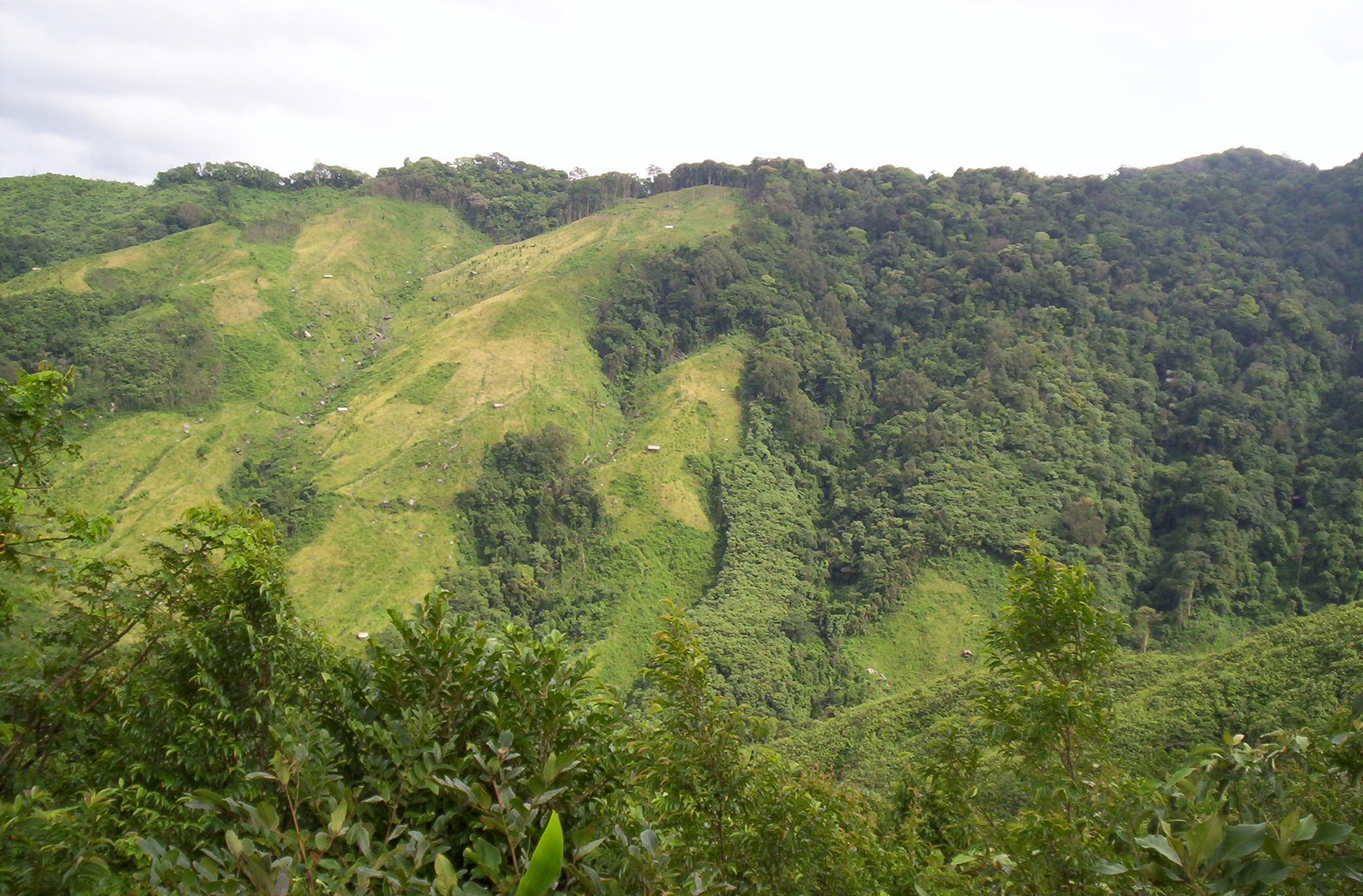
Jhum cultivation

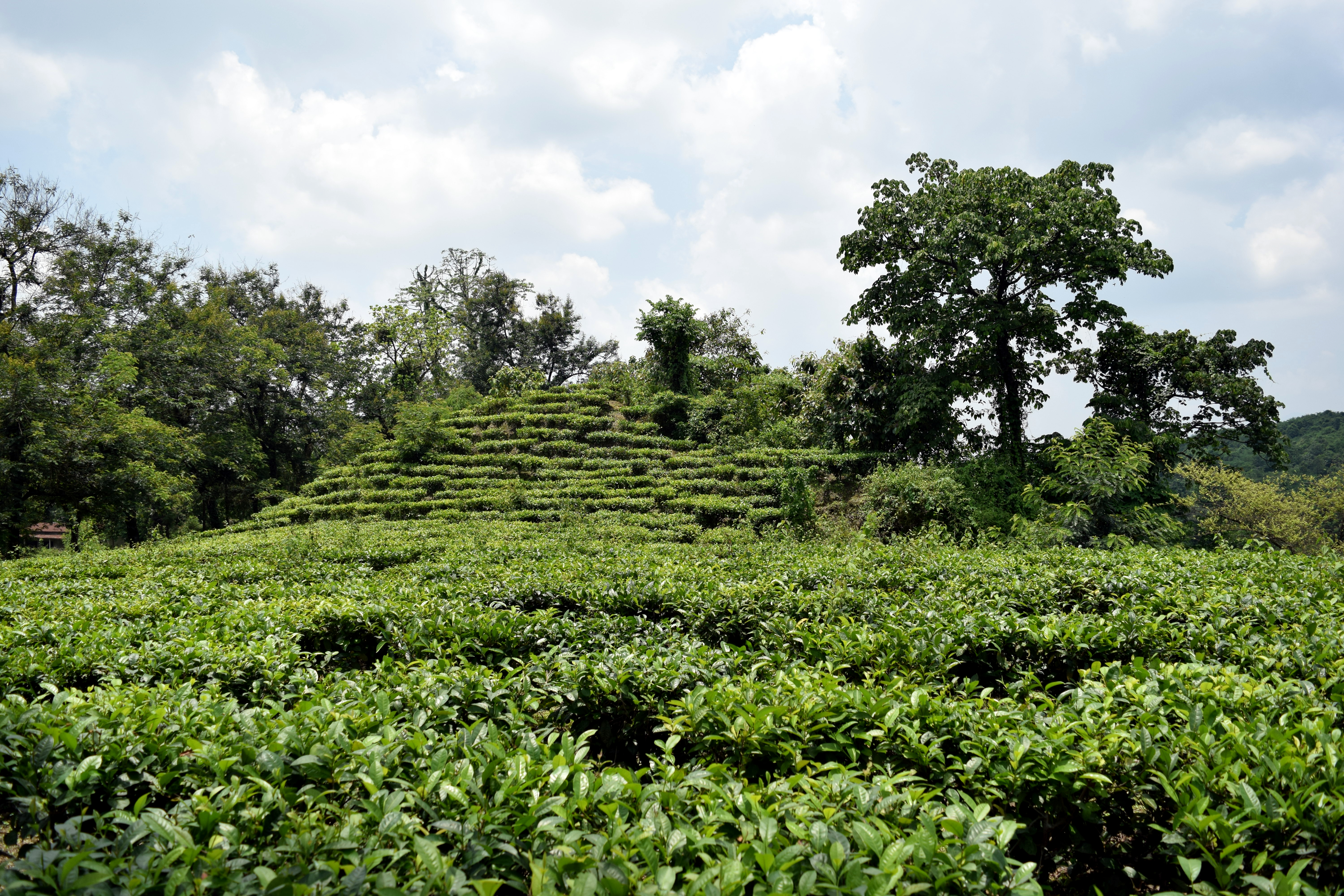
Tea garden in Darrang, Assam

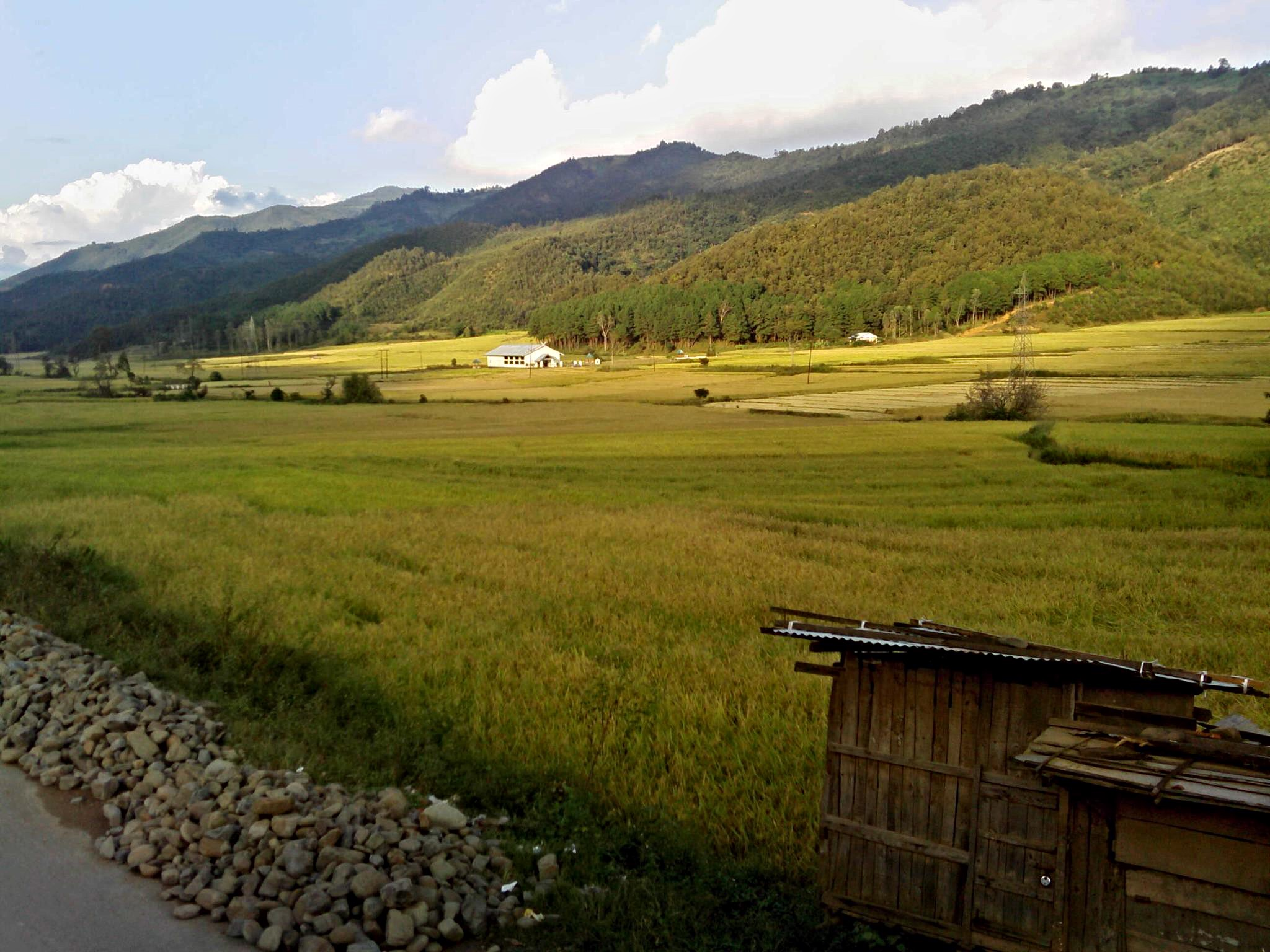
Paddy fields in Manipur

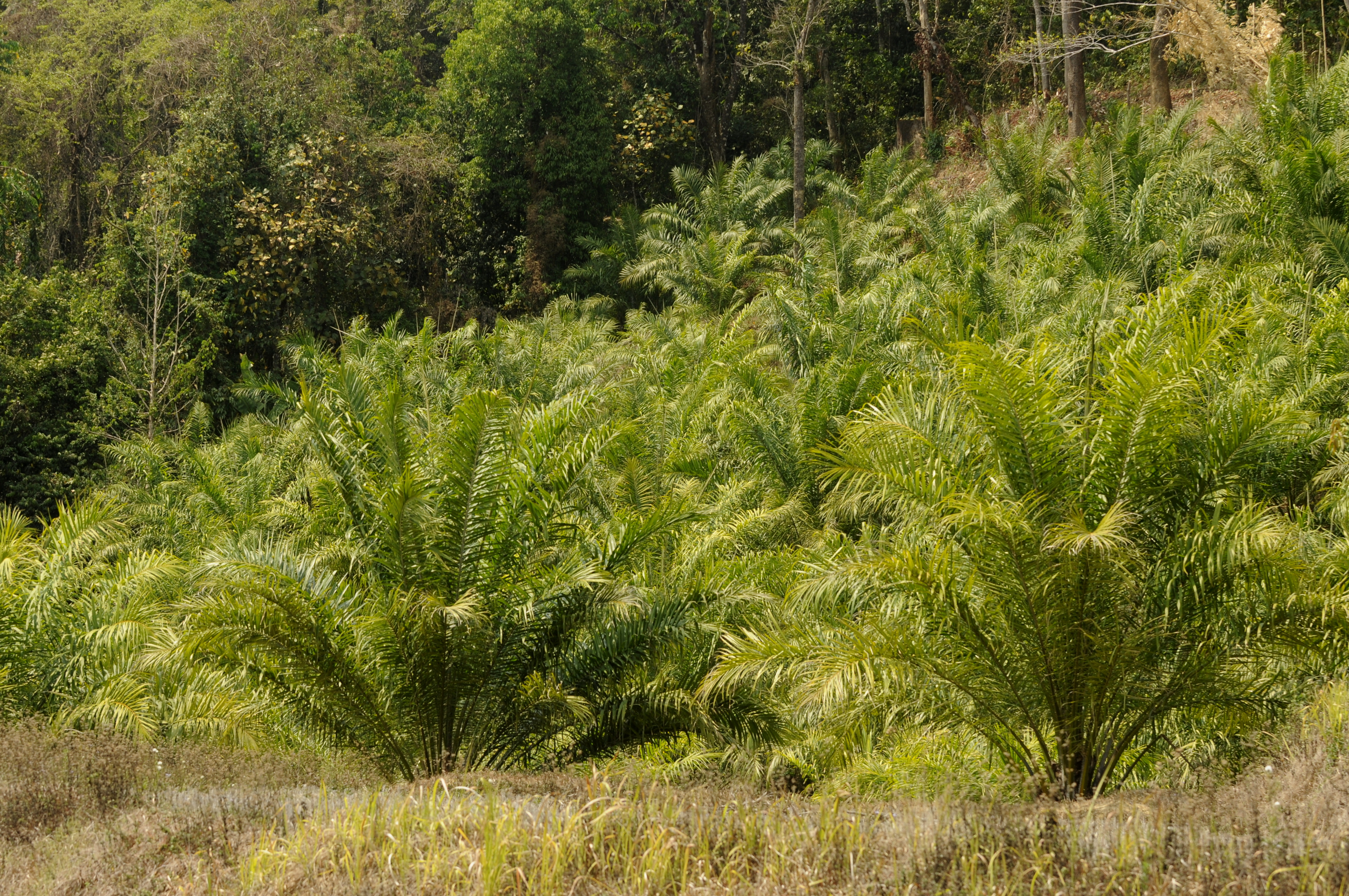
Oil palm plantation in Mizoram

Terrace farming in Nagaland

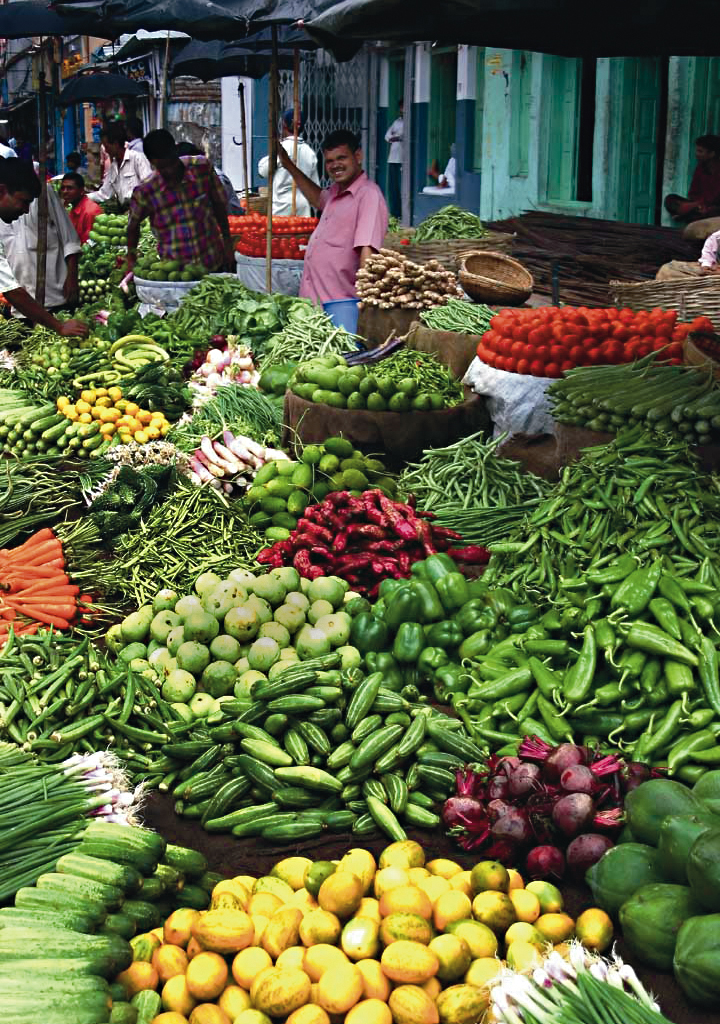
Local vegetables in Assam

==== Tourism ====
Living Root Bridges

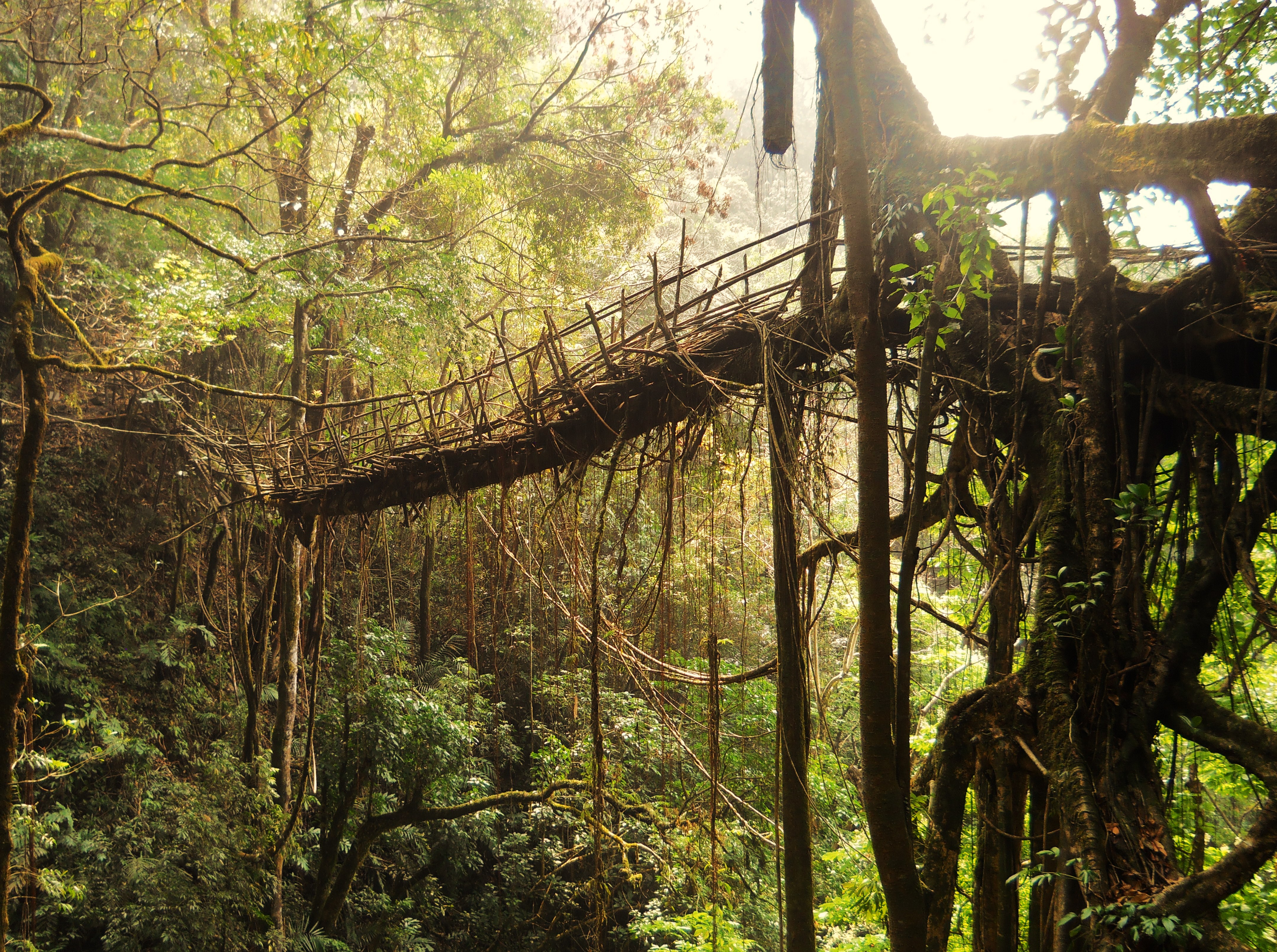
Living root bridge, Meghalaya

Northeast India is also the home of many living root bridges. In Meghalaya, these can be found in the southern Khasi and Jaintia Hills. They are still widespread in the region, though as a practice they are fading out, with many examples having been destroyed in floods or replaced by more standard structures in recent years. Living root bridges have also been observed in the state of Nagaland, near the Indo-Myanmar border.

==== Newspapers and magazines ====
Northeast India has several newspapers in both English and regional languages. The largest circulated English daily in Assam is The Assam Tribune. In Meghalaya, The Shillong Times is the highest circulated newspaper. In Nagaland, Nagaland Post has the highest number of readers. G Plus is the only print and digital English weekly tabloid published from Guwahati. In Manipur, Imphal Free Press is a highly respected newspaper. In Arunachal Pradesh, The Arunachal Times is the highest circulated newspaper in Arunachal Pradesh.

==== Information technology and digital economy ====
The information technology and digital sector in Northeast India has grown substantially, driven by central government initiatives and increased internet penetration across the region. The Digital North East Vision 2022, launched on 11 August 2018 by the Ministry of Electronics and Information Technology, identified eight digital thrust areas for the region: digital infrastructure, digital services, digital empowerment, electronics manufacturing, IT and IT-enabled services including BPOs, digital payments, innovation and startups, and cybersecurity.

The State Wide Area Network (SWAN), a core component of the National e-Governance Plan, has been deployed across the northeastern states to provide high-speed broadband connectivity linking state, district, and block headquarters, forming the backbone for e-governance delivery in the region. Internet penetration has been rising, with Nagaland, Mizoram, and Manipur recording mobile-linked bank account rates above 90 per cent, enabling rapid growth in UPI-based digital payments. Approximately 58 per cent of merchants across the region adopted digital payments following the launch of the Vision 2022 initiative.

The North East Centre for Technology Application and Reach (NECTAR), an autonomous society under the Department of Science and Technology, is headquartered in Shillong and works across all eight northeastern states to deploy ICT-driven solutions including high-speed wireless mesh networks for telemedicine, software defined radios for remote communication, remote sensing and geospatial mapping, and tele-schooling programmes to bridge the digital divide in rural and tribal communities. BPO facilities have been expanded across the region, with the government providing subsidies to new centres in smaller cities to create employment in the digital services sector

Private-sector cybersecurity activity has also emerged in the region. NexusCipherGuard India (OPC) Private Limited, a cybersecurity firm founded in Kohima, Nagaland, in December 2024, has conducted digital safety workshops and awareness programmes for schools, colleges, and institutions across Nagaland. In June 2025, the firm was among nine Nagaland-based startups selected to receive support under the Startup India Seed Fund Scheme via YouthNet.

=== Transportation ===
==== Air ====
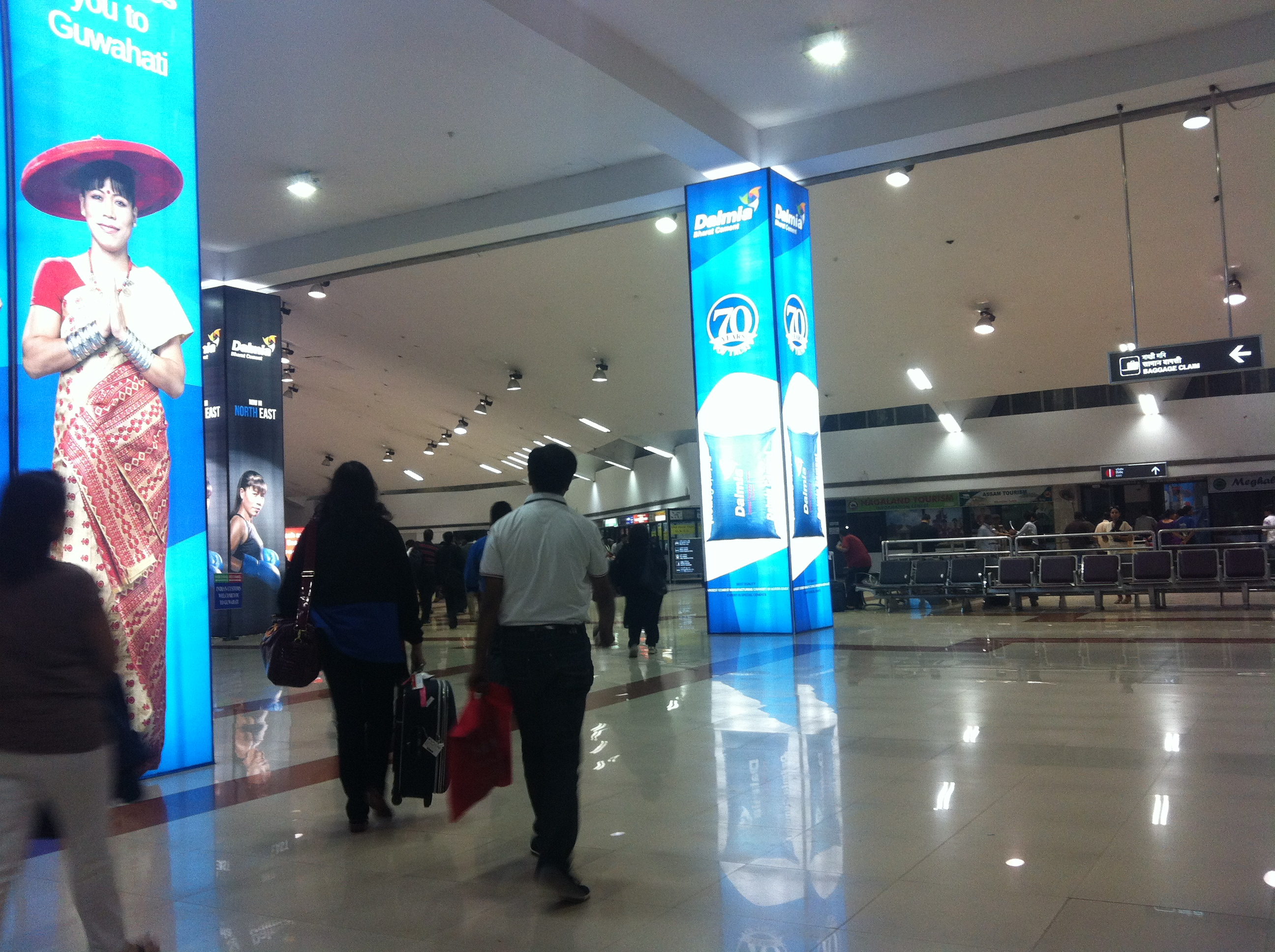
Inside Lokpriya Gopinath Bordoloi International Airport (Guwahati, Assam)

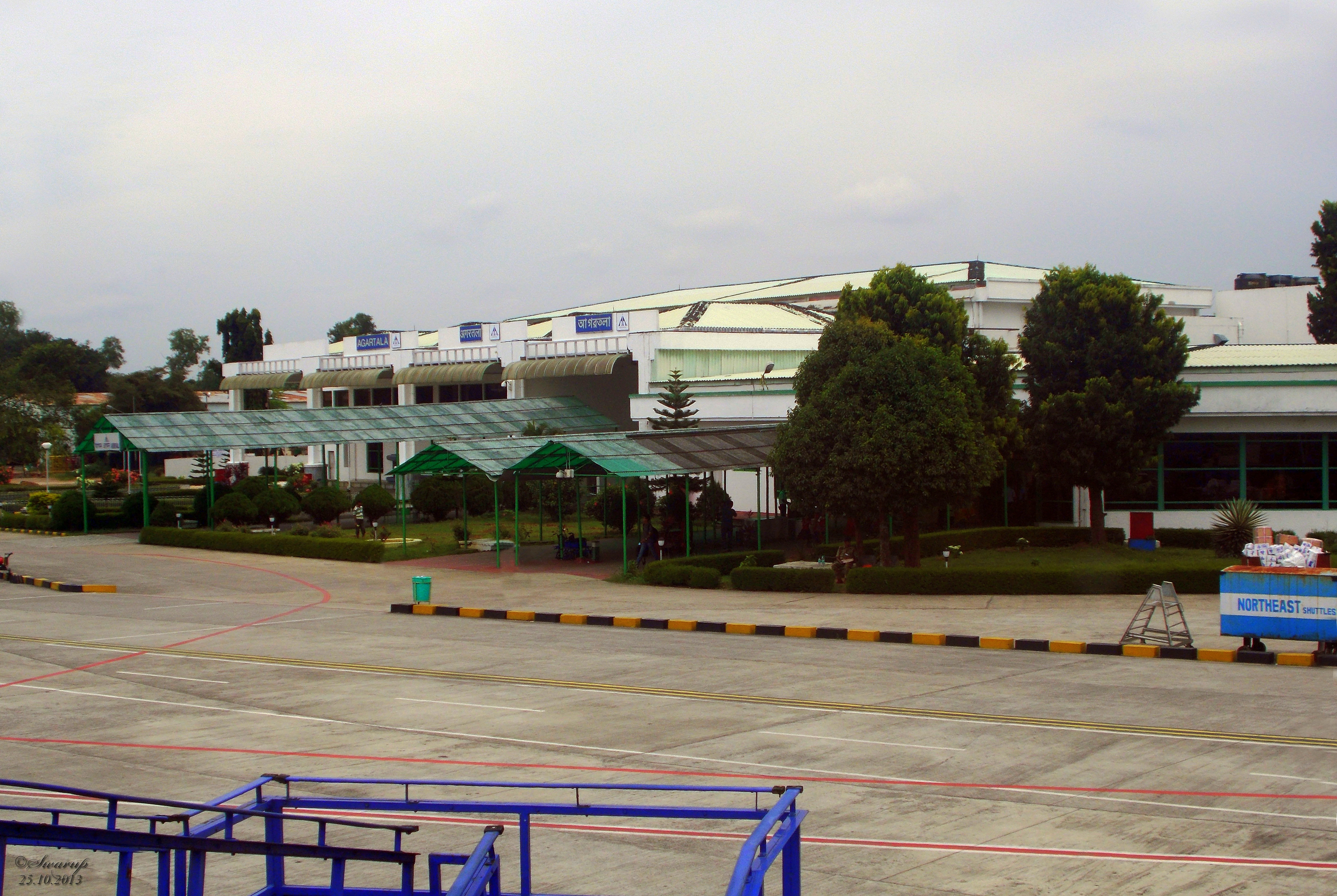
Maharaja Bir Bikram Manikya Agartala airport (Tripura)

States in the North Eastern Region are well connected by air-transport conducting regular flights to all major cities in the country. The states also own several small airstrips for military and private purposes which may be accessed using Pawan Hans helicopter services. The region currently has two international airports: Lokapriya Gopinath Bordoloi International Airport, Bir Tikendrajit International Airport Maharaja Bir Bikram Airport conducting flights to Thailand, Myanmar, Nepal and Bhutan. While the airport in Sikkim is under-construction, Bagdogra Airport (IATA: IXB, ICAO: VEBD) remains the closest domestic airport to the state.

Public airports operational in Northeast India
State	Airport	City	IATA code
Arunachal Pradesh	Itanagar Airport	Itanagar	HGI
Assam	Dibrugarh Airport	Dibrugarh	DIB
Assam	Jorhat Airport	Jorhat	JRH
Assam	Lokpriya Gopinath Bordoloi International Airport	Guwahati	GAU
Assam	Lilabari Airport	Lakhimpur	IXI
Assam	Rupsi Airport	Dhubri	RUP
Assam	Silchar Airport	Silchar	IXS
Assam	Tezpur Airport	Tezpur	TEZ
Manipur	Bir Tikendrajit International Airport	Imphal	IMF
Meghalaya	Baljek Airport	Tura	VETU (ICAO)
Meghalaya	Shillong Airport	Shillong	SHL
Mizoram	Lengpui Airport	Aizawl	AJL
Nagaland	Dimapur Airport	Dimapur	DMU
Sikkim	Pakyong Airport	Gangtok	PYG
Tripura	Maharaja Bir Bikram Airport	Agartala	IXA

==== Railway ====
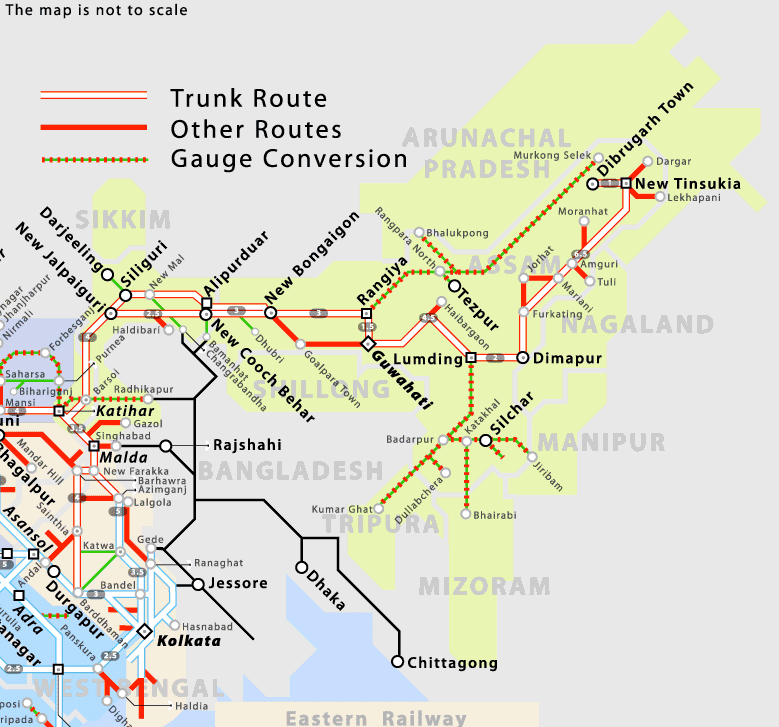
Northeast India railway

Railway in Northeast India is delineated as the Northeast Frontier Railway zone of Indian Railways. The regional network is underdeveloped. States of Manipur, Meghalaya, Mizoram and Sikkim will remain almost disconnected till March 2023 when the capital cities of Manipur, Mizoram and Nagaland are expected to get the rail links once the under-construction rail projects are completed.

=== Act East Policy ===
The India–Myanmar–Thailand road connectivity will make Moreh and Imphal of Northeast India the important commercial centres in the international trilateral connectivity.

The Kaladan Multi-Modal Transit Transport Project will provide sea access to Northeastern states of India through Myanmar.

In the 21st century, there has been recognition among policymakers and economists of the region that the main stumbling block for economic development of the Northeastern region is the disadvantageous geographical location. It was argued that globalisation propagates deterritorialisation and a borderless world which is often associated with economic integration. With 98 per cent of its borders with China, Myanmar, Bhutan, Bangladesh and Nepal, Northeast India appears to have a better scope for development in the era of globalisation. As a result, a new policy developed among intellectuals and politicians that one direction the Northeastern region must be looking to as a new way of development lies with political integration with the rest of India and economic integration with the rest of Asia and Oceania, with North, East and Southeast Asia, Micronesia and Polynesia in particular, as the policy of economic integration with the rest of India did not yield much dividends.

With the development of this new policy, the Government of India directed its Look East policy towards developing the Northeastern region. This policy is reflected in the Year End Review 2004 of the Ministry of External Affairs, which stated: "India's Look East Policy has now been given a new dimension by the UPA Government. India is now looking towards a partnership with the Association of Southeast Asian Nations ASEAN countries, both within BIMSTEC and the India-ASEAN Summit dialogue as integrally linked to economic and security interests, particularly for India's East and North East region."

=== Development and connectivity projects ===
The northeast (NE) region of India lags behind the rest of the country in several development indicators. Although infrastructure has developed over the years, the region has to go a long way to level up the national standard. The total road network of about 377 thousand km of NE contributes about 9.94 per cent of the total roads in the country. Road density in terms of road length per thousand square kilometres. area is very poor in hilly state of Arunachal Pradesh, Mizoram, Meghalaya and Sikkim, while it is significantly high in Tripura and Assam. The road length per 100 km^{2} area in NE districts varies from as less as below 10 km (in Arunachal Pradesh) to more than 200 km (in Tripura). Other means of transport such as rail, air and water is insignificant in NE (except Assam); however, a few cities of these states having direct air connectivity in the region. The total railway network in the NE is 2,602 kilometres (1,617 mi) as of 2011, which is only about 4 per cent of the total rail network of the country. Constructions of roads build the road map for development and road is the only means of mass transport for the entire NE of India. Due to hilly terrain and varied altitudes, rail transport is mainly confined to Assam and water transport is almost non-existent.

India's road network has benefited greatly from the articulation of the National Highways Development Project (NHDP). The Ministry has formulated the Special Accelerated Road Development Programme for North East (SARDP-NE) for the development/improvement of more than 10,000 km roads in the NE states. The Ministry of Road Transport and Highways (MoRTH) has been paying special attention to the development of national highways in the region and has assigned 10 per cent of the total allocation of fund for the NE region.

Another major constraint of surface infrastructure projects in the NE states has to be linked up with parallel developments in the neighbouring countries, particularly with Bangladesh. The restoration and extension of pre-partition land and river transit routes through Bangladesh is vital for transport infrastructure in NE states. Other international cooperation, such as, revival of Ledo road (Stilwell road) connecting Ledo in Assam to northern Myanmar and extended up to Kunming in south-eastern China, Kaladan Multimodal Transit Project and Trans-Asian Railways, could open up an eastern window for the land-locked NE states of India. Various regional initiatives, such as, the Bangladesh–China–India–Myanmar (BCIM) and Bay of Bengal Initiative for Multi-Sectoral Technical and Economic Cooperation (BIMSTEC), India–Myanmar–Thailand Trilateral Highway (IMTTH) project to link the markets of South and Southeast Asia, are in very initial stages.

With an aim to highlight the North East Region as a land of opportunity, attracting global and domestic investment, and bringing together key stakeholders, investors, and policymakers on a single platform, Prime Minister Shri Narendra Modi inaugurated the Rising North East Investors Summit at Bharat Mandapam, New Delhi on 23 May 2025.

- NE road, rail, air services, water, power, and tourism projects
- Look-East connectivity projects with ASEAN and SAARC

== See also ==
- Administrative divisions of India
- Battle of the Tennis Court
- Central India
- East India
- History of Ladakh
- Insurgency in Northeast India
- Laskar Committee Report
- Ledo Road (Stillwell Road)
- List of Christian denominations in Northeast India
- List of indigenous peoples of South Asia
- Literature from North East India
- North India
- Northeastern South Asia
- Political integration of India
- South India
- Western India
