= Bangladesh and the Indo-Pacific Strategy =

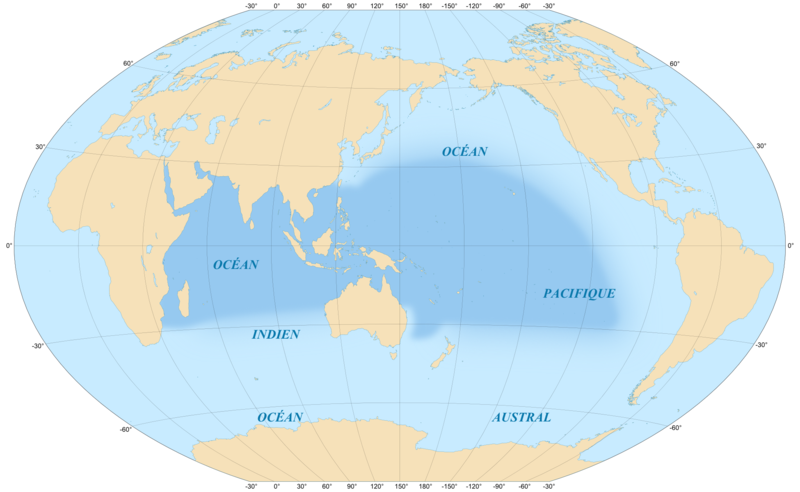
Indo-Pacific biogeographic region map

The Indo-Pacific strategy is the U.S. Government's vision for a free, open, and secure Indo-Pacific region in which countries of the Indo-Pacific are empowered to tackle 21st-century challenges and seize emerging opportunities.

== Strategic significance ==
As the Indo-Pacific narrative gains prominence, Bangladesh's strategic location at the apex of the Bay of Bengal— the world's largest bay, covering 2.17 million km^{2}—positions it as a crucial facilitator and connector between regions and competing powers. Its role in enhancing regional connectivity is vital to the Indo-Pacific strategy, making Bangladesh a crucial contributor to shaping the region's future.

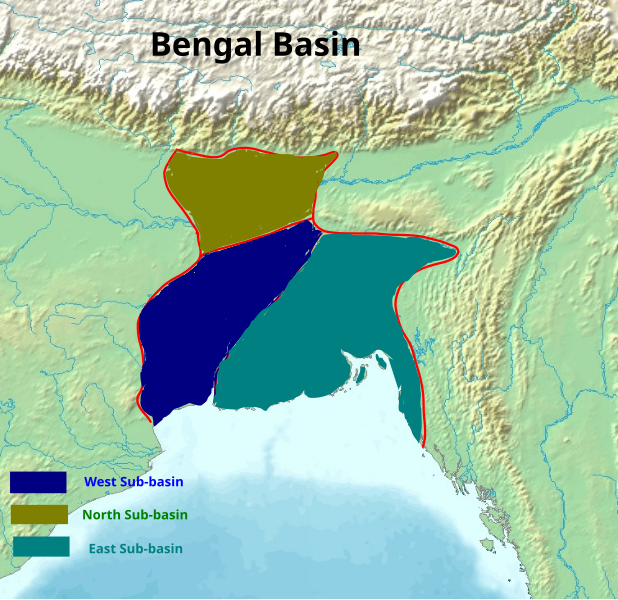
The map of the Bengal Basin highlighting its geostrategic significance from historical colonization to its pivotal role in the contemporary Indo-Pacific landscape.

The U.S. strategy in the Indo-Pacific aims to prevent the dominance of any single country, thereby ensuring a balanced geopolitical landscape in the region. Although Bangladesh is not a member of the Indo-Pacific Economic Framework for Prosperity (IPEF), it views the framework as essential for supporting a free, open, peaceful, secure, and inclusive Indo-Pacific region.

== Relationships with major powers ==
Bangladesh's relationship with major powers, particularly India, faces uncertainty following Sheikh Hasina's resignation, as her government had been a key ally in New Delhi's regional strategy. With the rise of an interim leadership under Muhammad Yunus, Bangladesh's alignment within the Indo-Pacific could shift, potentially impacting trade and security ties with both India and other global powers. This political transition may also influence broader dynamics in the Indo-Pacific Strategy, as major powers reassess their engagement with Bangladesh.

== United States ==
The U.S. and Bangladesh share a vision for an inclusive, secure, and prosperous future, characterized by substantial economic ties marked by significant U.S. investment and trade. The U.S. supports Bangladesh's development efforts, including those focused on labor rights and human capital investment, while fostering democratic governance. This partnership is crucial for advancing a free and open Indo-Pacific strategy, highlighting mutual interests in regional stability and cooperation.

== China ==
Bangladesh's relationship with China is important for its development goals and aligns with the broader Indo-Pacific strategy, focusing on mutual cooperation and economic growth. The partnership, rooted in historical ties and extensive investment through the Belt and Road Initiative, is vital for regional stability and prosperity. As both nations collaborate on infrastructure and trade, they strengthen their geopolitical influence in the Indo-Pacific while supporting each other's core interests.

== India ==
India and Bangladesh share a vision for enhancing connectivity, trade, and collaboration, emphasizing the interlinked progress and mutual benefits. Bangladesh, as a close neighbor with growing capabilities, is central to India's "Neighbourhood First," "Act East policy," SAGAR doctrine, and Indo-Pacific vision, playing a crucial role in developing India's northeastern region. This partnership aims to strengthen regional stability and integration while addressing challenges such as water resource management and defense cooperation. Their commitment reflects cooperation within the broader geopolitical landscape of the Indo-Pacific region. Following the student-led protests against the government in 2024, Sheikh Hasina relocated to India. This political shift has raised questions about Dhaka's potential realignment with neighboring countries. As India navigates this geopolitical change within the Indo-Pacific strategy, it must adapt its approach to maintain a constructive partnership with Bangladesh amid evolving political dynamics.

On September 24, 2024, during the United Nations General Assembly in New York, President Joe Biden met with Chief Adviser Muhammad Yunus of Bangladesh to congratulate him on his new role leading the Interim Government and to reaffirm the established partnership between the U.S. and Bangladesh, emphasizing the importance of economic and political stability based on democratic values. This engagement comes at a critical time as Bangladesh navigates its political transition, signaling U.S. interest in the Bengal Basin as part of its Indo-Pacific strategy. This development also requires India to adapt its approach amid shifting geopolitical dynamics in the region.

== European Union ==
In April 2026, the European Union and Bangladesh initialed a Partnership and Cooperation Agreement (PCA), with the EU describing Bangladesh as a key partner in the Indo-Pacific region. The agreement covers 82 articles on political dialogue, trade, energy, climate action, security, and maritime affairs, making Bangladesh the first South Asian country to conclude such a modern agreement with the EU.

== Diplomatic engagements ==
The Bengal Basin, through the Bay of Bengal, has historically been a contested region among major Asian and European powers due to various strategic rivalries. By balancing its relationships with major powers such as the United States, China, and India, Bangladesh is navigating complex geopolitical dynamics while striving for economic development and national security.

Following Hasina's ousting, Bangladesh is undergoing a political transition, with citizens hopeful for reforms in governance.

During the Awami League government's tenure in Bangladesh (2009–2024), India maintained strong support for Bangladesh, which raised concerns among various stakeholders regarding inclusivity in governance. This alignment influenced perceptions of the Indo-Pacific policy, subsequently increasing U.S. interest in the country.

The India-Bangladesh relationship is crucial for the U.S.-led Indo-Pacific strategy, especially in the context of U.S. ally Japan's engagement with ASEAN and the Quad, as a counter to China's Belt and Road Initiative (BRI).

The U.S. is keenly interested in Bangladesh's economic stability, particularly given that Bangladesh is second only to China in its reliance on the garment and textile industry. This stability can be bolstered through ongoing economic aid and humanitarian assistance, including support for Rohingya refugees. Maintaining Bangladesh as a strategic partner in the region will be crucial for U.S. interests, particularly in countering the influence of China and Russia.

The United States Agency for International Development (USAID) announced a $202 million grant to enhance governance, social, human, and economic opportunities in a deal signed on September 15, 2024, in Dhaka.

== See also ==
- Indo-Pacific
- Indo-Pacific Economic Framework
- Indo-Pacific Strategy of South Korea
- Free and Open Indo-Pacific
- Bengal Basin
- Bay of Bengal
- Teesta Water Dispute
