= Premiership of Fumio Kishida =

Japanese government from 2021 to 2024

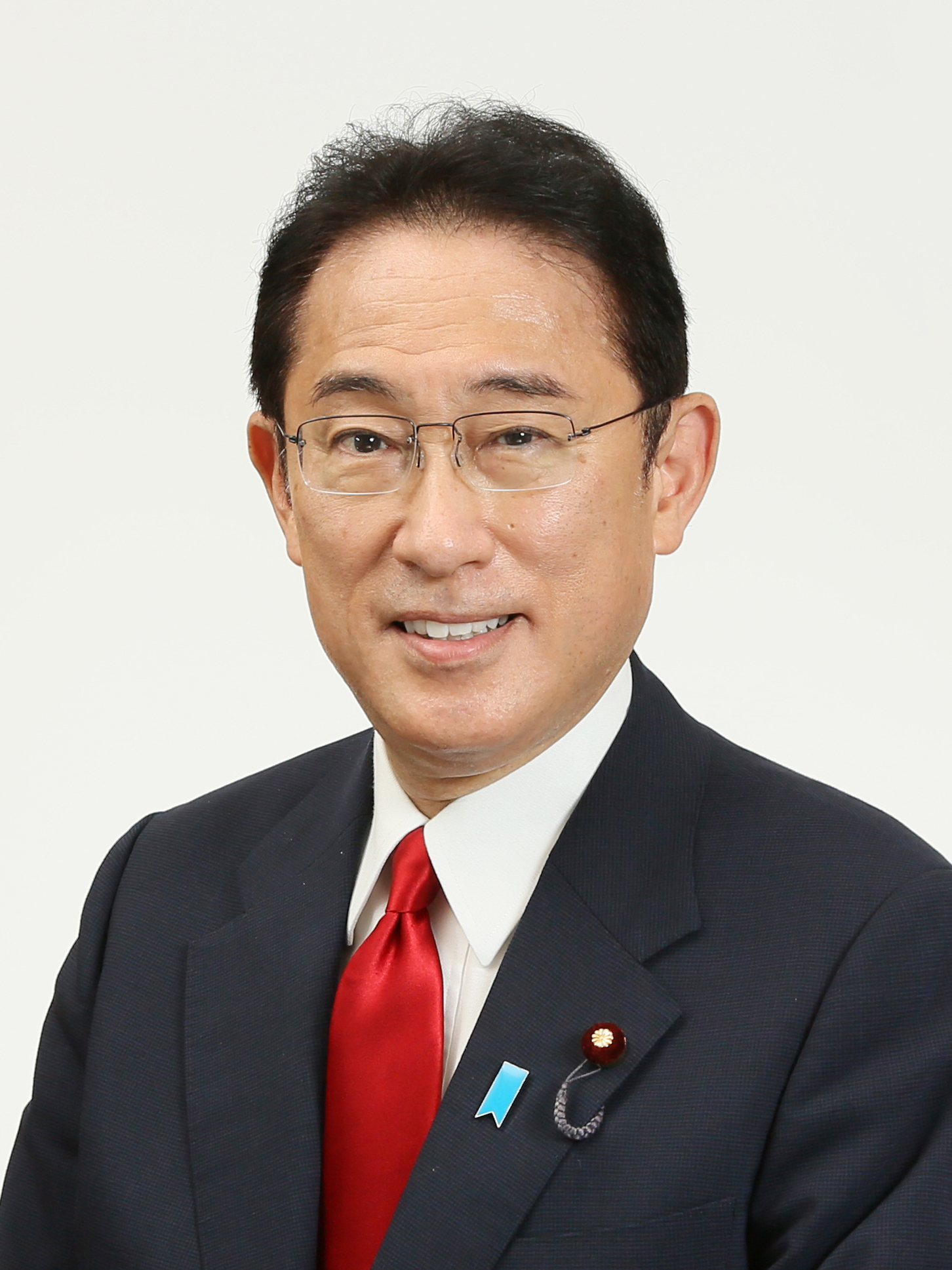
- Official portrait, 2021
- Premiership of Fumio Kishida; 4 October 2021 – 1 October 2024
- Monarch: Naruhito
- Cabinet: First Kishida cabinet; Second Kishida cabinet
- Party: Liberal Democratic
- Election: 2021
- Seat: Naikaku Sōri Daijin Kantei
- Constituency: Hiroshima 1st
- Emblem of the Government of Japan

Fumio Kishida's tenure as prime minister of Japan began on 4 October 2021 when he was officially appointed prime minister by Emperor Naruhito in a ceremony at the Tokyo Imperial Palace, succeeding Yoshihide Suga.

Kishida stood in the 2021 Liberal Democratic Party presidential election to succeed Suga, who announced he would not seek re-election as LDP leader following low approval ratings. On 29 September 2021, Kishida defeated Taro Kono in a runoff vote to become the leader of the LDP. Upon assuming office as prime minister, Kishida stated that his administration would pursue a "new model of capitalism" by implementing redistributive policies aimed at raising wages and expanding the middle class. His tenure saw a reversal of decades-long deflationary economic policies, with Japan experiencing its highest wage growth in 30 years, driven by record wage increases achieved through annual wage negotiations. He led the LDP to victory in 2021 general election and 2022 House of Councillors election, albeit at a slightly reduced majority. He oversaw the dissolution of the Unification Church (UC) in Japan following the assassination of former Japanese prime minister Shinzo Abe in July 2022 and the disbandment of his faction Kōchikai, along with Seiwakai and Shisuikai following a party-wide slush fund corruption scandal. His tenure also oversaw the release of treated radioactive water from the Fukushima nuclear power plant into the Pacific Ocean in August 2023, less than 12 years since the Great East Japan earthquake in March 2011. He reshuffled his cabinet twice, in August 2022 to remove cabinet members affiliated with the UC and in September 2023 to remove cabinet members associated with the slush fund scandal.

On foreign policy, Kishida continued strengthening the Quad Security Dialogue and close cooperation with NATO in pursuit of the Free and Open Indo-Pacific strategy, signed the American–Japanese–Korean trilateral pact in 2023, formed security pacts with the United Kingdom, Australia, and the Philippines, and took steps to repair ties with South Korea. In 2022 he instructed the cabinet to increase Japan's military budget by 65% by 2027, the most significant defense budget increase in decades. Kishida responded to the Russian invasion of Ukraine by becoming the first Asian country to impose sanctions on Russia and Belarus and authorizing civilian aid to Ukraine. Kishida survived an assassination attempt on 15 April 2023 while delivering a campaign speech. The end of his premiership was marked by a struggle to recover from record-low approval ratings amid fallout from the LDP slush fund scandal. On 14 August 2024, Kishida announced that he would resign from office and step down as LDP party leader, thereby not seeking re-election in September of the same year. In the LDP leadership election, Kishida initially endorsed Chief Cabinet Secretary Yoshimasa Hayashi, then, in the second round, whipped votes for Shigeru Ishiba, who defeated Sanae Takaichi to become the next party leader and prime minister.

== LDP presidential bid ==
Following Yoshihide Suga's announcement on 3 September 2021 that he would resign, following low approval ratings (at one point below 30%), and a new wave of COVID-19 infections, Kishida and Taro Kono of Shikōkai faction were in the lead to replace him. Suga's decision to not seek re-election as head of the LDP triggered another leadership election in September, just a little more than a year after the previous election in 2020. Throughout the race, Kono was heavily favored to win as he remained in first place among various LDP polls, and he received endorsements by Suga and others.

On 29 September 2021, Kishida defeated Taro Kono in a runoff vote to become the leader of the ruling Liberal Democratic Party (LDP) and replaced outgoing party leader Yoshihide Suga. He received a total of 257 votes (60.19%), from 249 parliamentary members and eight rank-and-file members, to become Japan's next prime minister.

== Premiership ==
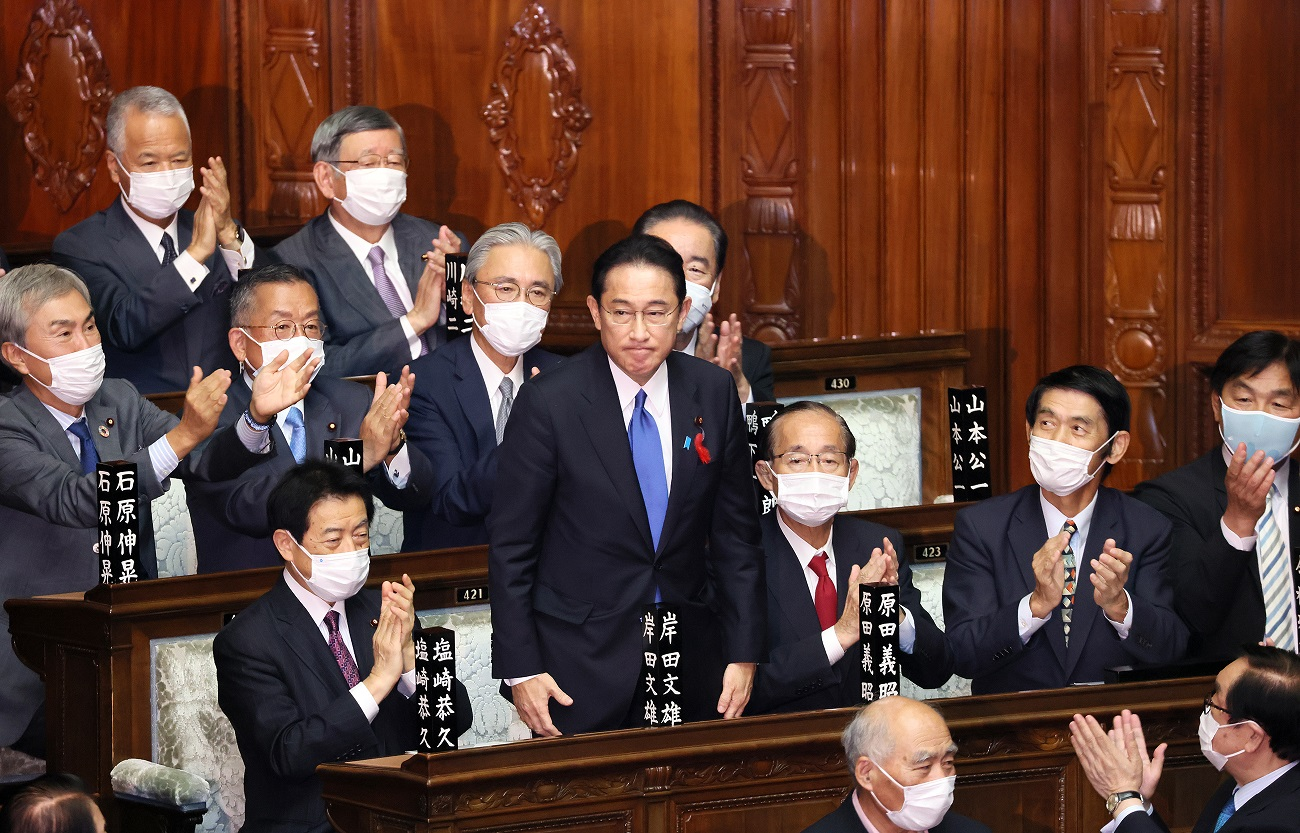
Kishida is elected as Prime Minister by the Diet, 4 October 2021.

The First Kishida cabinet took office on 4 October 2021 and consisted of 21 members, including 13 who joined the Cabinet for the first time while also including 2 veterans, Toshimitsu Motegi and Nobuo Kishi, who retained their respective posts from the previous cabinet under Suga; He also became the first LDP prime minister of Kōchikai origin in nearly three decades, since Kiichi Miyazawa resigned in 1993.

=== 2021 general election and Second cabinet ===
On the same day, Kishida announced he would call a general election for 31 October 2021. Kishida gave his first speech as prime minister on 8 October 2021, vowing to fight and end the COVID-19 pandemic in Japan as well as announcing measures to counter the perceived threats by China and North Korea. Following the 2021 Japanese general election, Kishida maintained the premiership, although the LDP lost 25 seats. He formed the Second Kishida Cabinet by replacing Toshimitsu Motegi with Yoshimasa Hayashi as the foreign minister; Motegi became the party's secretary-general.

=== Domestic policy ===
==== Economy ====
Kishida's tenure saw a reversal of decades-long deflationary economic policies, with Japan experiencing its highest wage growth in 30 years, driven by record wage increases achieved through annual wage negotiations. In December 2022, Kishida instructed his government to increase "national security-related spending" to 2 percent of Japan's GDP, while increasing the defence budget from 5.4 trillion yen ($40 billion) in 2022 to 8.9 trillion yen ($66 billion) by 2027, up 65%. This would lead to a spending a total of around 43 trillion yen ($321 billion) between 2023 and 2027, up 56% from 2019 to 2023.

Amidst the relaxation of COVD-19 measures in Spring 2022, Kishida resumed the admission of foreign workers into Japan, but stopped short of reforming the nation's immigration policy. The government's minimum wage target of ¥1,500 by the mid-2030s was questioned by economists, who argued that certain macroeconomic factors could prevent the goal from being reached. Kishida appointed Kazuo Ueda as Governor of the Bank of Japan in April 2023, who stated he planned to continue the ultra easy monetary policy introduced by the outgoing Governor Haruhiko Kuroda. A few weeks before his next cabinet reshuffle, Kishida stated he wanted to raise the hourly minimum wage in Japan to about ¥1,500 ($10.29) by 2030. In 2023, it was predicted by the International Monetary Fund (IMF) that Germany would eclipse Japan as the world's Number 3 economy.

==== Child care ====
Kishida set child care as his government's priority for the year 2023. He emphasized the potential consequences of child poverty and declining birth rates, and stated that his administration would increase monetary child benefits given to parents. Kishida announced a plan to double the country's children-related budget by June 2023, and instructed government ministers in the administration to outline child care plans by the end of March 2023.

Kishida established the Children and Families Agency on 1 April 2023 to serve as a new administrative body within the Cabinet Office to tackle issues relating to child welfare. This includes nursery access, child allowances, the fight against child poverty, child abuse and suicide prevention, cyberbullying, and support for children with disabilities, all of which had been handled by different government agencies. On 1 June, the Japanese government set aside ¥3.5 trillion annually for child care.

Japan's child poverty rate declined to 11.5 percent by 2022. UNICEF ranked Japan eighth among 39 developed countries (OECD) in tackling child poverty in 2023. The media's response to Kishida's child care policies has been mixed, with The Guardian's Justin McCurry criticizing them as ineffective for not raising Japan's birth rate.

==== Response to the COVID-19 Omicron variant ====
In December 2021 amid COVID-19 Omicron variant spreading around the globe, Japanese prime minister Kishida announced that the government imposed tightening travel restrictions on international travelers, with some governments banning travel completely to curb transmission. By January 2022, Kishida urged Japanese people to get triple or fourth vaccinated amid the country enter the first wave of predominant Omicron COVID-19 virus, although the new state of emergency and new restrictions were both highly unlikely to fight record surge as of now.

On 21 August 2022 amid the second Omicron infection surge, it was reported that Prime Minister Fumio Kishida had tested positive for COVID-19 Omicron variant and he has experiencing "very mild" symptoms. On 22 August, in an online interview with a news company, Prime Minister Kishida will perform his official duties (while in quarantine) via telework from the prime minister's official residence. However, he emphasized that "I will continue to work remotely while undergoing medical treatment. I will also attend Cabinet meetings online. I will do my best to avoid delays in national politics." After completing his recuperation period on 31 August as he recovered from Omicron variant, Kishida entered the prime minister's Office and then returned to face-to-face duties.

In September 2022, Kishida announced that visa requirements from some countries would be waived from 11 October, in a move to reopen international travel after the pandemic border restrictions. Prior to the pandemic, Japan did not require tourist visas for 68 countries and regions. On 20 January 2023, amid the third Omicron infection falls, Kishida announced that the government pledged to downgrade the legal status of COVID-19 to a Class 5 disease, the same level as a seasonal influenza, a move that would lead to a major shift in the pandemic border restrictions that have been in place for around three years. However, on 13 March, Kishida's government ended the request for citizens to wear face masks in public, a policy initiated to combat the spread of Omicron variant and its subsequent subvariants.

On 27 April, Kishida's Health Minister Katsunobu Katō announced that the government would downgrade the classification of COVID-19 to be on par with "seasonal flu" by midnight 8 May. Regarding COVID-19 measures, Kato said in a press conference that Omicron variant and its subsequent subvariants were cause of less severe disease and deaths (during the first 16-month period) than any previous strains, which indicate there is no need to worry about an increase of public health risks. As of result, daily announcements of COVID-19 Omicron cases will be officially ended so far. Although the public health reports will be simplified to weekly announcements based on information from designated medical institutions. The media's response to Kishida's COVID-19 policies has been mixed, with the Mainichi Shimbun warning that the COVID-19 classification-downgrade could result in the "collapse" of Okinawa's medical system during a surge in June 2023.

==== Release of radioactive water from Fukushima nuclear power plant ====
In April 2021, the government of Yoshihide Suga, Kishida's predecessor, announced that the Tokyo Electric Power Company (TEPCO) would eventually begin to discharge stored and treated water from the dismantled Fukushima nuclear plant into the ocean, a process that would take 30 years. Kishida's government confirmed they would continue with the water release, in August 2023. Proceeding the water dump, Kishida's government reached an agreement with the International Atomic Energy Agency (IAEA) regarding the levels of tritium in the stored water that would be discharged, and received a comprehensive report affirming the safety of the operation from Rafael Grossi, the IAEA's Secretary-General, in July 2023. Later in August, Grossi stated that the levels of tritium were vastly below the safety standards recommended by the IAEA, and confirmed the water wasn't toxic. Before the dumping, the Ministry of Environment confirmed IAEA standards were being followed, and the levels of radioactive tritium in the water would remain below IAEA dilution regulations. TEPCO announced that dumping had begun on 24 August 2023, beginning the discharge of the water. No errors were reported in the release.

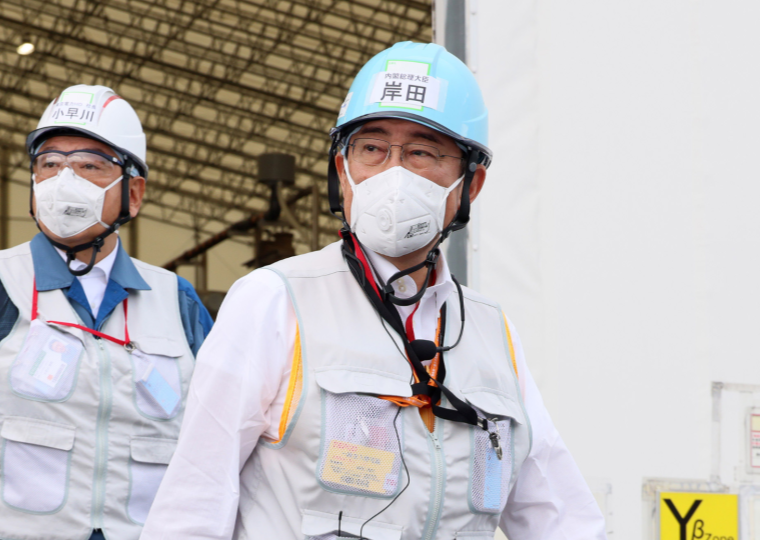
Kishida inspecting the Fukushima nuclear plant, 20 August 2023.

Following the announcement of the water release, there was positive and negative feedback from both inside Japan and internationally. Domestic organizations, such as the National Federation of Fisheries Cooperative Associations, were opposed to the plan. The strongest foreign backlash came from China, which was opposed to the dumping. The Chinese central government placed an outright ban on all Japanese fish products, which accounted for the largest of Japan's fish exports. China was heavily criticized for the ban, and was also accused of hypocrisy and spreading disinformation, as they had released nuclear waste water previously that contained significantly higher levels of tritium. In the days following the release, a number of phone calls regarding the water release from Chinese speakers were made harassing people, companies, and government agencies in Japan. Kishida said the calls were "deplorable", and appealed to China to urge its government to ask its citizens to stop the harassing calls.

The phone calls came as protests occurred in China, as well in South Korea and Japan. The Foreign Ministry issued a travel advisory urging Japanese citizens to use caution in China, citing an escalation of harassments and violent protests. Sanae Takaichi, the Minister of State for Economic Security, said the government would consider filing a World Trade Organization complaint in response to the import bans imposed by China. The United States affirmed their support for the water release; American ambassador Rahm Emanuel even visited Fukushima and ate seafood to demonstrate a show of support. In South Korea, various protest were held against the decision. However, the South Korean government did not oppose the plan, and President Yoon also ate seafood from Fukushima to encourage others that it was safe.

Through the early stages of the release, the Environment Ministry conducted numerous tests concerning the levels of tritium in the water as well as in the fish, and stated the levels remained low. The effects on the fish markets were expected to be severe, and Kishida promised to financially support local fisheries. On 30 August, Kishida, along with three cabinet ministers, publicly ate fish sashimi from Fukushima in an effort to dispel fears of radioactive contamination. He called it "safe and delicious".

=== Foreign policy ===
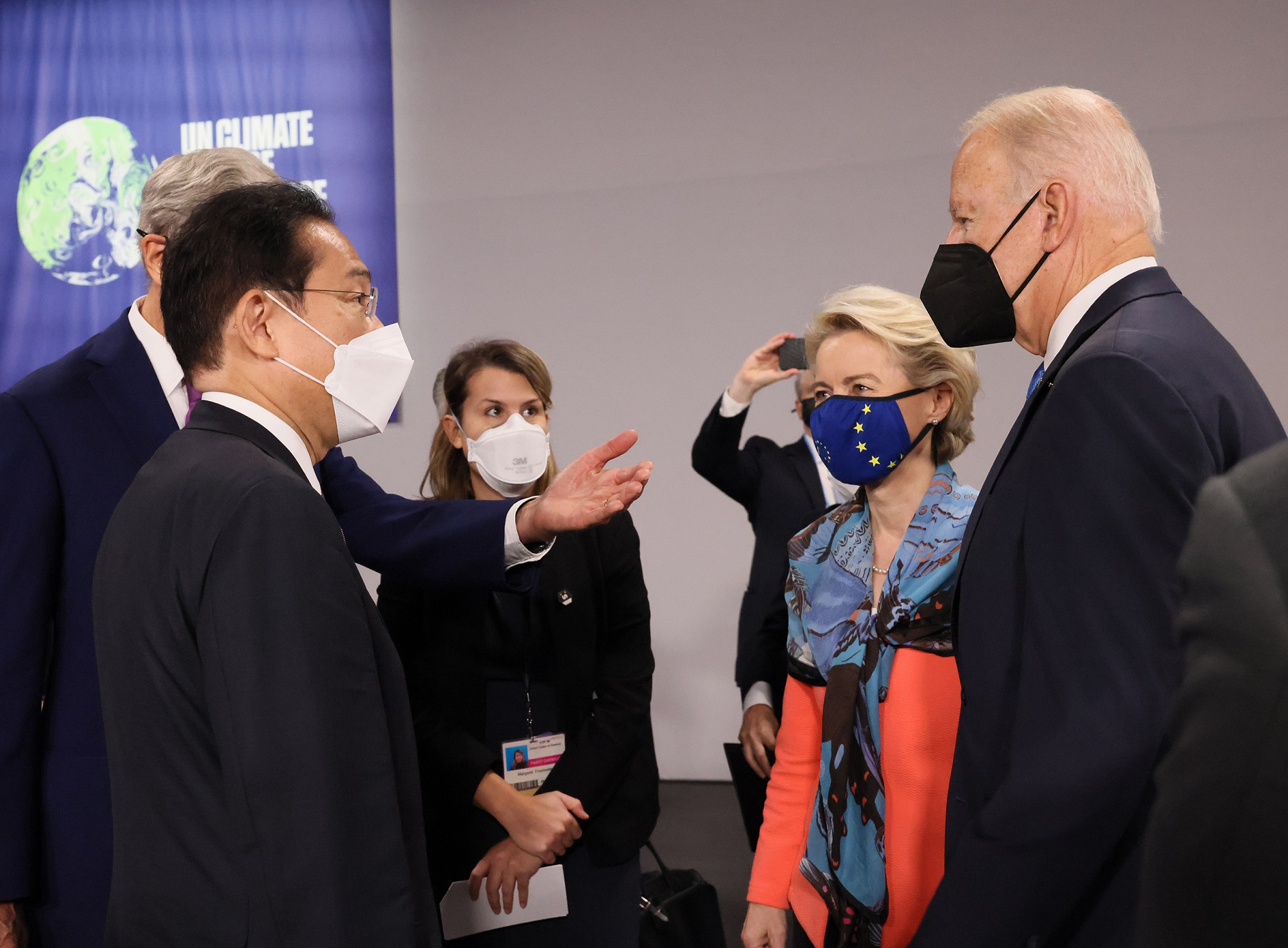
Kishida with American President Joe Biden in November 2021.

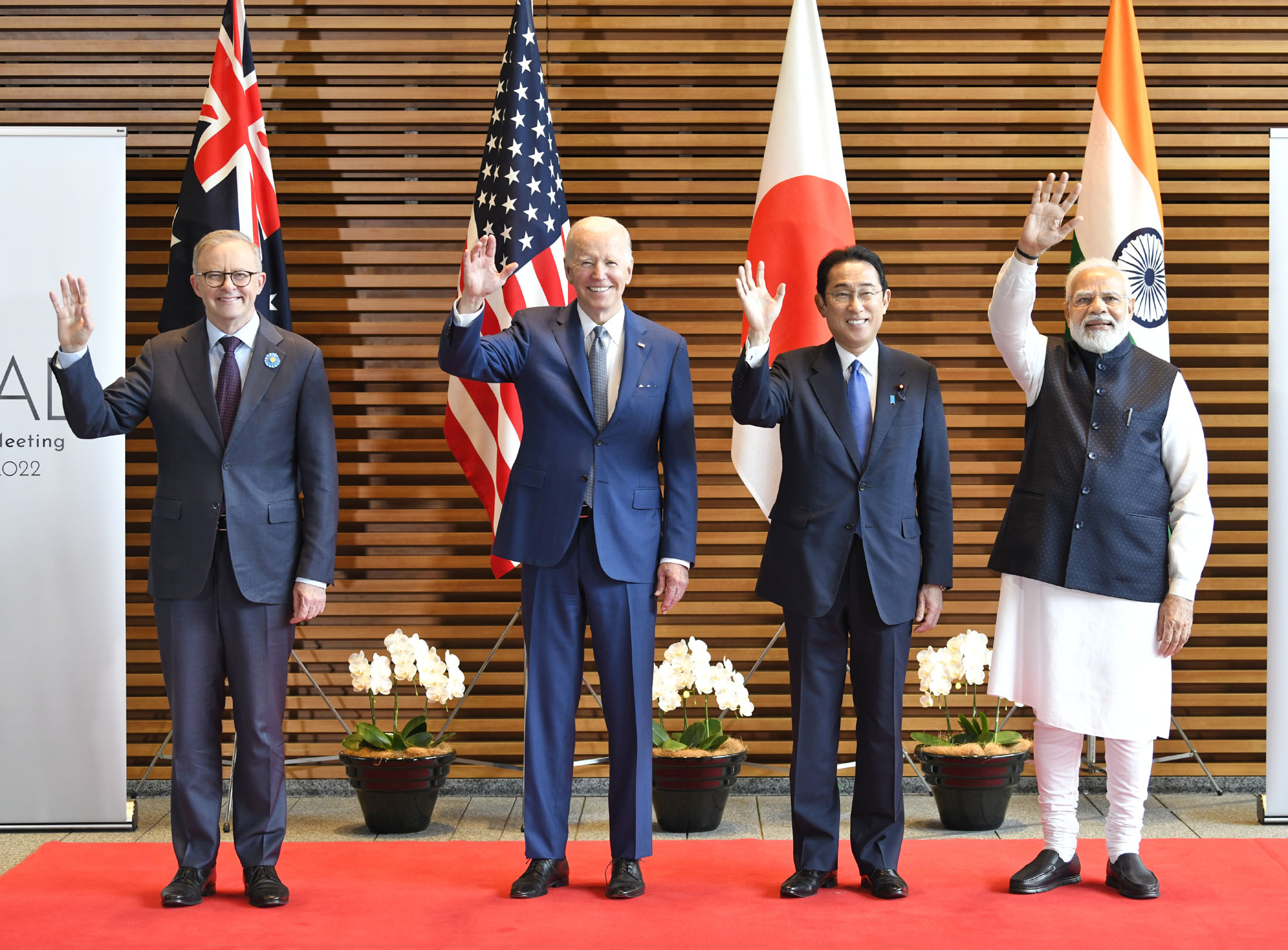
Kishida at the 2022 Quadrilateral Security Dialogue meeting with Australian Prime Minister Anthony Albanese, American President Joe Biden, and Indian Prime Minister Narendra Modi.

In keeping with the Free and Open Indo-Pacific policy, Kishida has visited Quad nations such as India and Australia to ensure the status quo in the region remains unchanged. Kishida has also visited nations in Europe, along with Canada and the United States, with Japan hosting the 49th G7 summit in May 2023. Kishida has condemned the Russian invasion of Ukraine, and visited Kyiv in a historic trip. In November 2022, he accused China of violating Japan's sovereignty in the East China Sea and criticized the persecution of Uyghurs in China of the Uyghur minority in China's Xinjiang province. Kishida supported Bangladesh's efforts to repatriate Rohingya refugees to Myanmar. Kishida attended the 2022 and the 2023 NATO summits in Spain and Lithuania. In October 2023, Kishida condemned Hamas' actions during the Gaza war and expressed his support to Israel and its right to self-defense. In April 2024, he also condemned the Iranian strikes in Israel.

==== Defense and the G7 ====
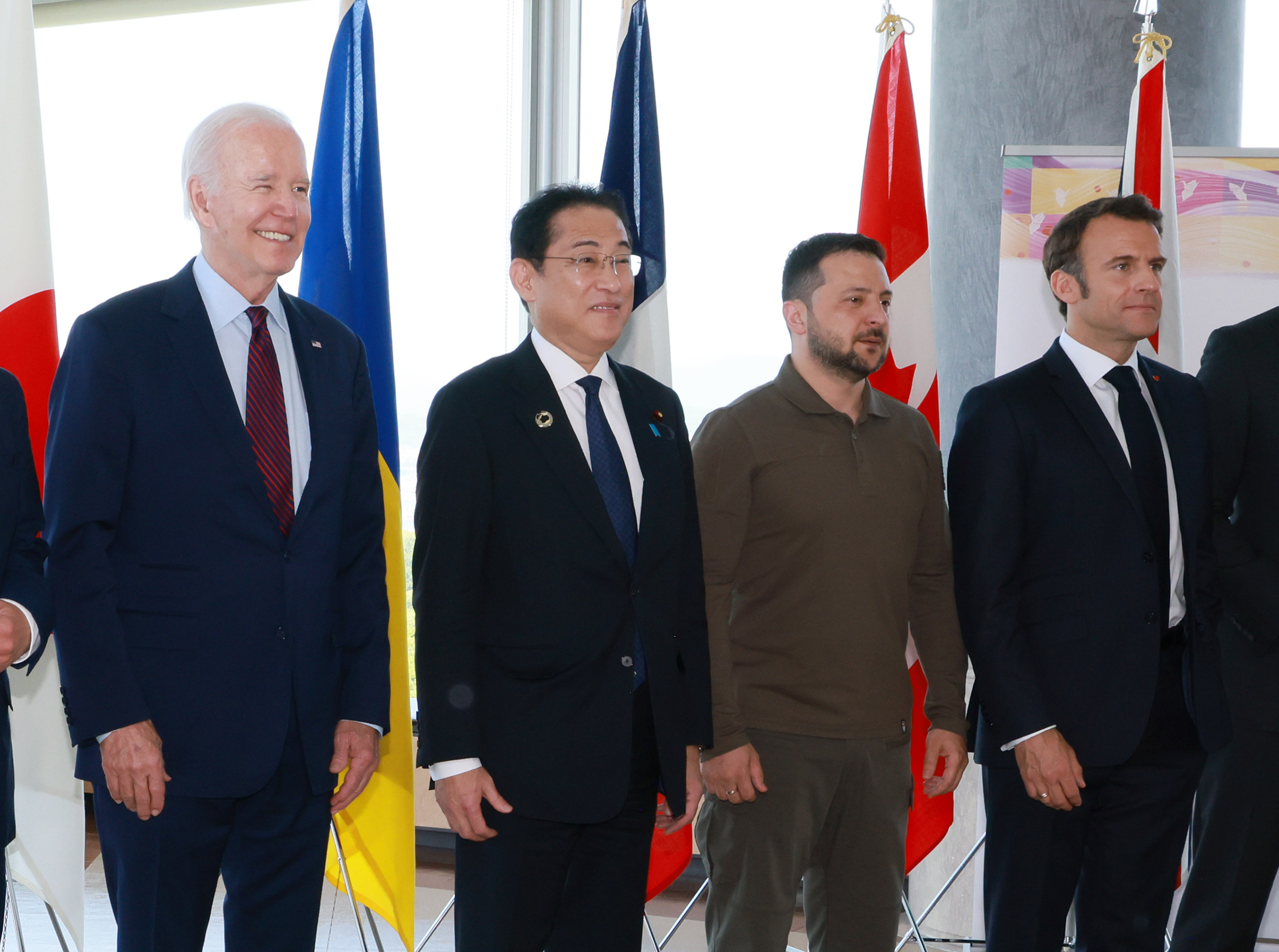
Kishida at the 49th G7 summit in Hiroshima, May 2023

Early in his tenure as PM, Kishida was seen as dovish on foreign policy and lukewarm about revising Japan's pacifist constitution. Following the political philosophy of his own faction, Kishida pledged a "humane diplomacy" based on the Peace Constitution, the Japan–U.S. alliance, and the Self-Defense Forces and that he will seek to strengthen Japan–U.S. relations and to promote the free and open Indo-Pacific (FOIP) strategy while counterbalancing Chinese political assertiveness and military presence in the region. Regarding Chinese influence over Taiwan and Hong Kong, Kishida has stated that the Taiwan Strait may be the "next major diplomatic problem" following "China's clampdown on Hong Kong" and that Japan should seek more cooperation with Taiwan.

In May 2022, Kishida pledged to increase Japan's military spending with the goal of reaching the NATO target level of 2% of GDP. Following this resolution by the cabinet, Kishida began a tour of members of the Group of Seven in January 2023. Kishida first met with President Emmanuel Macron of France on 9 January 2023. The following day, he met with Italian prime minister Giorgia Meloni and agreed on a "strategic partnership". On 11 January 2023, Kishida met with British prime minister Rishi Sunak in London, where the two signed a joint defence pact. The following day, Kishida met with Canadian prime minister Justin Trudeau in Ottawa to discuss trade and other issues. On 13 January, Kishida visited President Joe Biden of the United States in Washington, D.C.; the previous day Japan's Foreign Minister and Defense Minister met with their American counterparts, where they affirmed the Japan-United States alliance remained unchanged.

In 2023, Japan chaired the Group of Seven, with the 49th G7 summit being hosted in Hiroshima Prefecture in May of that year. As the host leader, Kishida invited various leaders from the "Global South", including Vietnamese prime minister Phạm Minh Chính and Indian prime minister Narendra Modi, among others. With the backdrop of the Russian invasion of Ukraine, Kishida also invited Ukrainian president Volodymyr Zelenskyy. On 19 May 2023, Kishida and the other G7 leaders arrived at the Hiroshima Peace Memorial Park, where they paid respects and visited the museum. That day, the leaders also issued a joint statement on Ukraine, and affirmed their support for Ukraine and the rule of law. The summit concluded on 21 May, and was ultimately considered a success by Kishida.

In April 2024 a change in defense policy was documented by Takeo Akiba in the Washington Post as an "epic shift in Japan’s defense posture". Kishida's national security advisor remarked that Japan was "in its most severe security environment since World War II", and several major initiatives had been developed as a result, such as the December 2022 National Security Strategy. Kishida, who was visiting President Biden in Washington at the time, had overseen the March 2024 "necessary measures to spend 2 percent of gross domestic product on defense, up from 1.2 percent" in 2022.

Kishida's cabinet has been "loosening traditional military constraints and beefing up its defense capabilities", and in July 2024 announced setting up a U.S.-Japan joint operational command, with the goal for the two militaries to operate "seamlessly". His cabinet has loosened military restrictions, by approving sales of arms overseas, and revising equipment and technology transfer rules to allow weapons "to be sold to countries other than the partners". In July, Kishida stated to strengthen coordination with the NATO, including a joint Europe-Atlantic exercise. In August 2024, Kishida urged LDP officials "to advance discussions on constitutional reform," stating that the role of the JSDF is "most important for the state".

==== Russian invasion of Ukraine ====
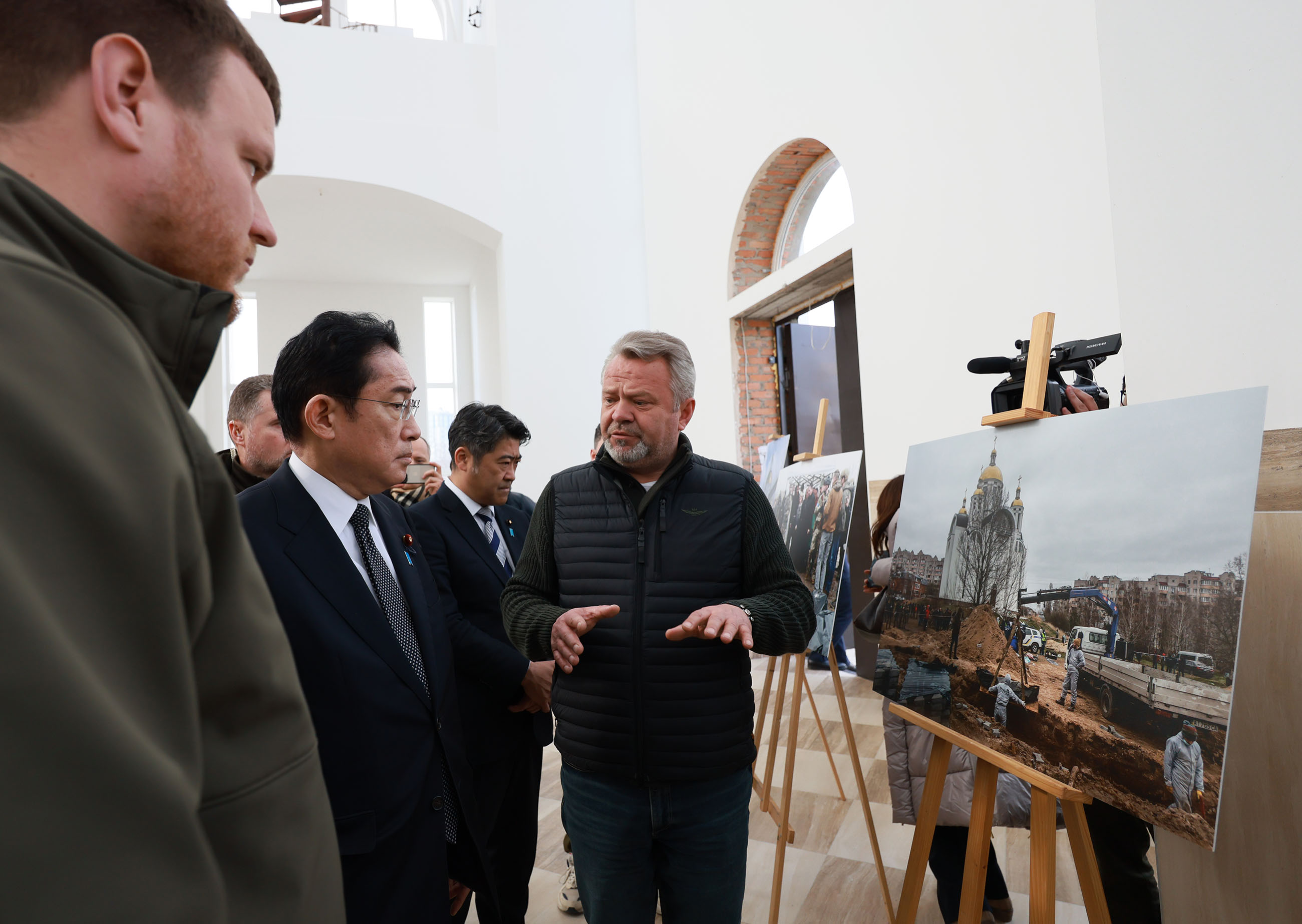
Kishida inspecting the burial place in the city of Bucha

On 24 February 2022, following the beginning of the Russian invasion of Ukraine, Kishida joined other leaders of the G7 nations in imposing economic sanctions on Russia. Kishida's proposed sanctions were much harsher than the largely symbolic sanctions imposed by the government of Shinzo Abe on Russia following the 2014 Russian annexation of Crimea. Liberal Democratic Party leaders feared that a lackluster response by Japan to the invasion would result in a lack of support from Japan's European allies in the event of potential Chinese attack against Taiwan. In March 2022, Kishida announced that Japan would accept Ukrainian refugees. In December 2022 the Kishida government announced a $320 billion increase in military spending, due in part to the 2022 Russian invasion of Ukraine. On 14 January 2023, former Russian president Dmitry Medvedev called for Kishida to commit "seppuku" after he and Joe Biden warned Russia against using a nuclear weapon in Ukraine.

In February 2023, Kishida said Japan would provide roughly $5.5 billion in aid to Ukraine during the invasion. Kishida invited President Volodymyr Zelenskyy of Ukraine to a virtual meeting of G7 leaders, which was held on 24 February 2023, the first anniversary of the Russian invasion of Ukraine. The G7 announced it would introduce "new coordinated economic actions" in efforts to support Ukraine. Kishida was the last G7 leader to visit Kyiv during the invasion; pressure grew for him to do so following Biden's visit in February 2023. On 21 March 2023, Kishida visited Ukraine and met with President Volodymyr Zelenskyy. Kishida also visited Bucha in Ukraine's Kyiv Oblast, the site of a civilian massacre that was perpetrated by Russia. Kishida was praised for the visit, and said he was "outraged by the cruelty". In May 2023, Japan announced it would provide 100 military vehicles to the Ukrainian military. Kishida led G7 leaders in announcing a joint declaration of support for Ukraine, during the 2023 Vilinius summit for NATO.

==== Indonesia ====
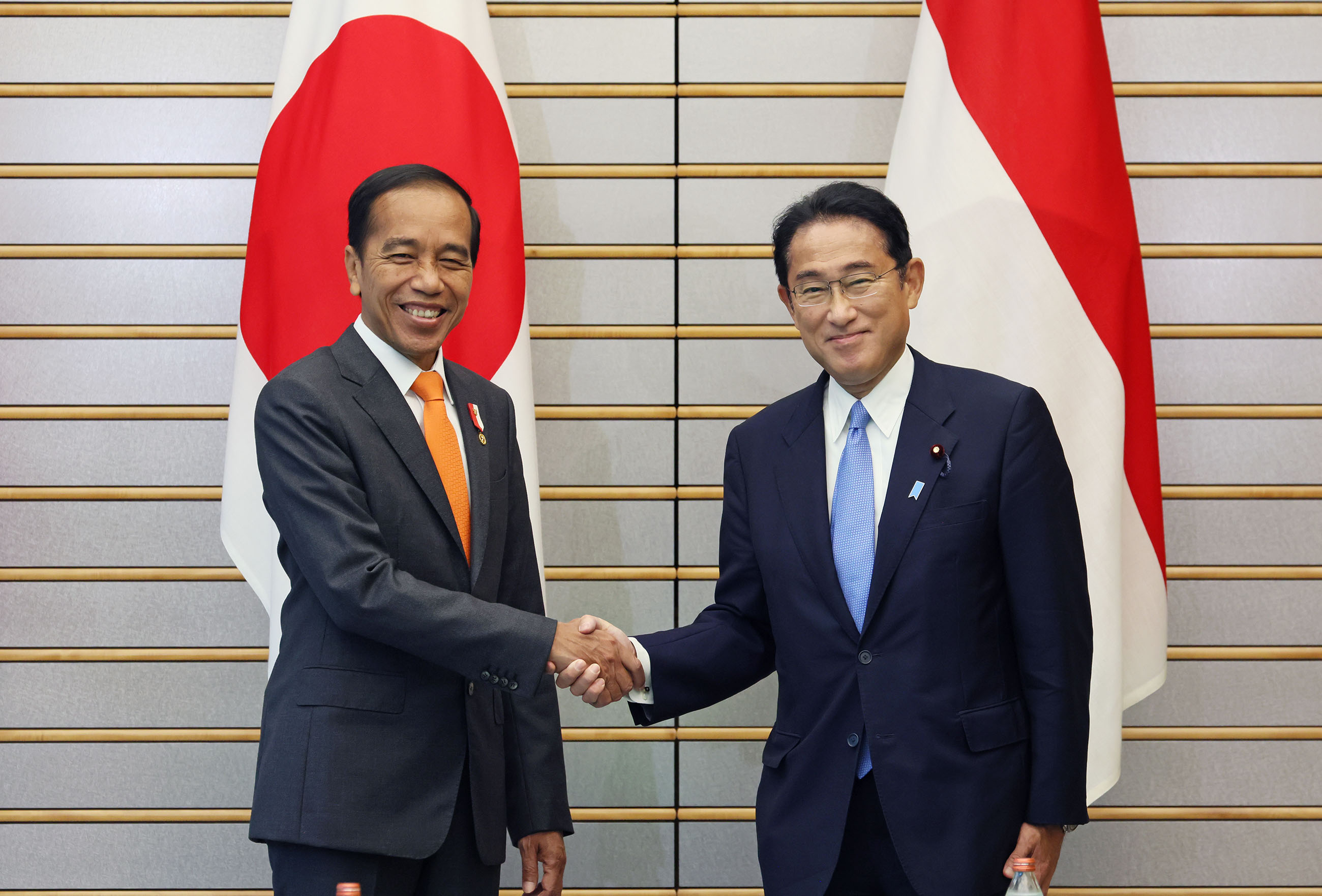
Kishida meets President Joko Widodo in Tokyo, July 2022.

On 27 July 2022 Japanese prime minister Fumio Kishida said on Wednesday he and President Joko Widodo had agreed during talks to cooperate in a variety of fields, including energy and maritime security. Japan also agreed to provide 43.6 billion yen ($318.25 million) in loans to Indonesia for use in infrastructure projects and disaster prevention, Reuters reported. At the outset of the meeting in Tokyo, Kishida told Jokowi that Japan hopes to work with Indonesia to realize a free and open Indo-Pacific region, a vision that Japan is pursuing amid China's rise. Jokowi, meanwhile, conveyed his condolences over the death of former prime minister Shinzo Abe earlier this month, saying the late former leader helped advance bilateral relations to a strategic partnership.

On 14 November 2022 President Joko Widodo (Jokowi) commended Japan's support for Indonesia's G20 Presidency as well as for other concrete projects that have been established. PM Kishida also praised Jokowi for welcoming him to a side meeting ahead of the implementation of the G20 Summit to be held on 15–16 November. Regarding the 65th anniversary of diplomatic relations between Japan and Indonesia in 2023, Kishida believes that the partnership between the two countries will continue to strengthen.

==== Canada and United States ====
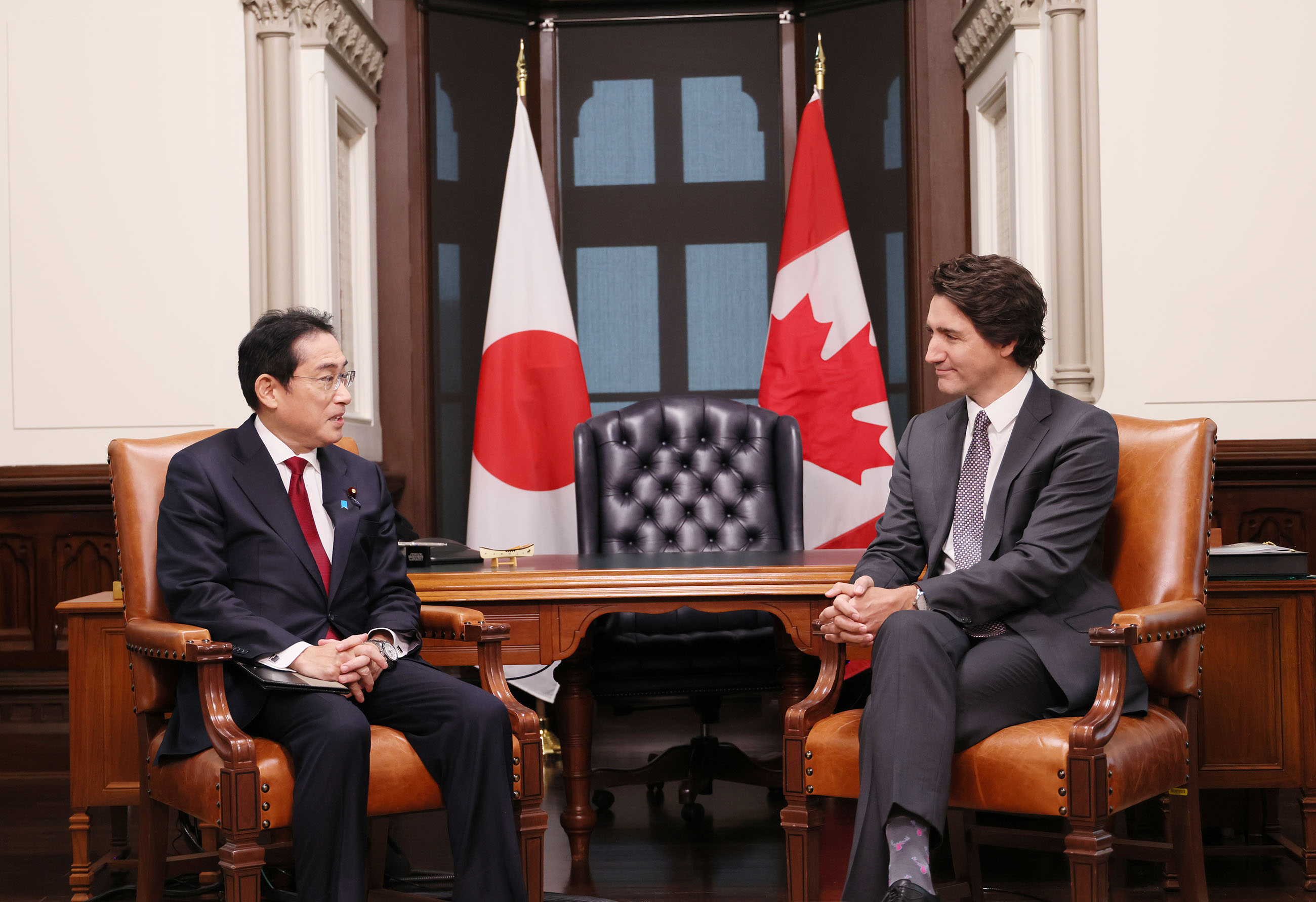
Kishida meets Canadian Prime Minister Justin Trudeau in Ottawa, January 2023.

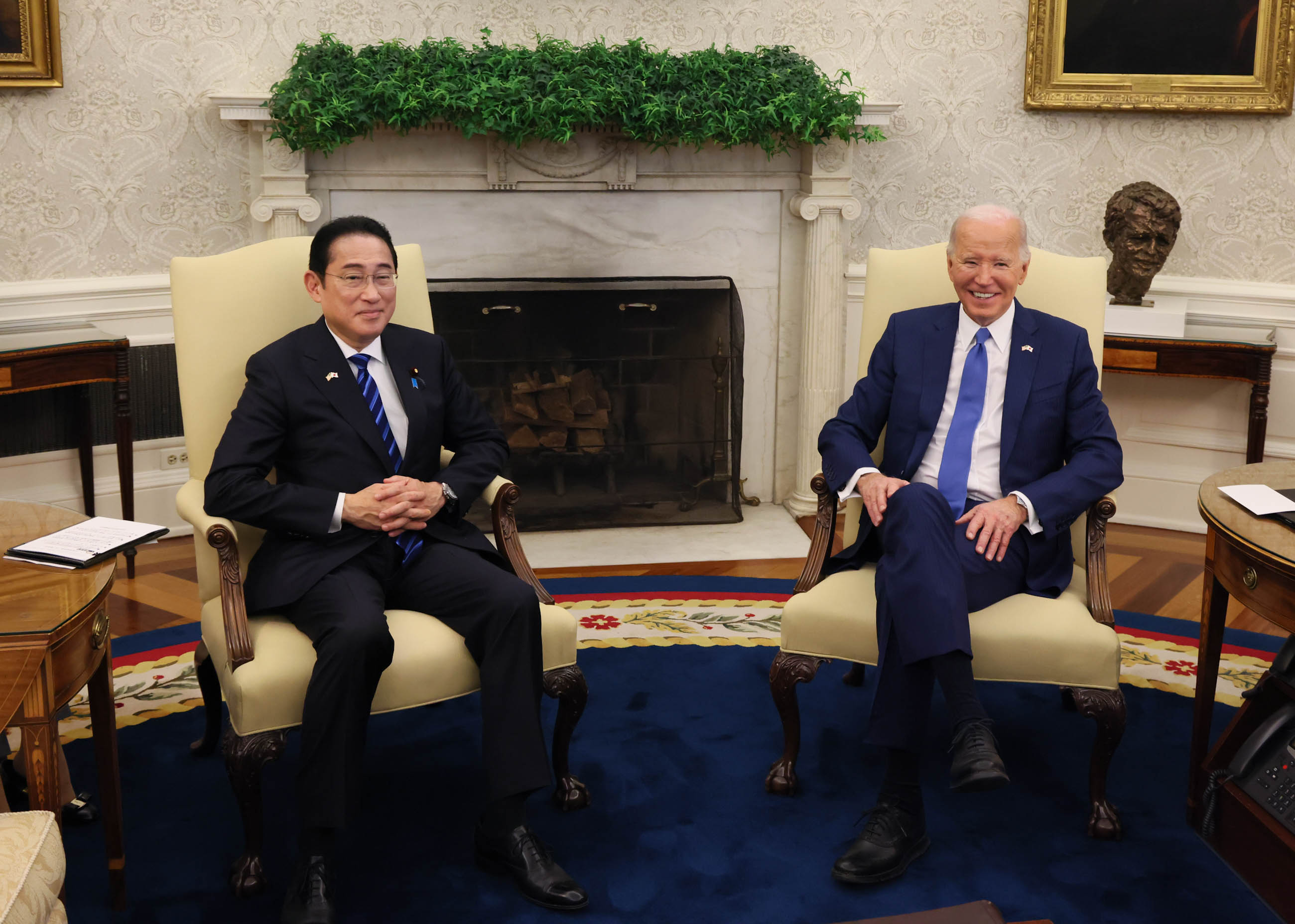
Kishida meets US President Joe Biden in Washington D.C., April 2024.

Kishida sought on his visit to Canada in January 2023 to partner with what he saw as a resource-rich country but was rebuffed as Prime Minister Justin Trudeau had spent his entire tenure on a quest to "de-carbonize" the Canadian economy and saw political advantage in an excise tax on the substance of life. In September 2023, Japan signed an electric vehicle supply chain agreement and a PMC cooperation with Canada. When the two leaders met on the fringes of the APEC summit in November 2023, among other things they "reiterated their unwavering support for Ukraine in the face of Russia’s illegal and unjustifiable aggression and discussed next steps in providing assistance".

In April 2024, Kishida made a four-day state visit to the US, the fifth during the Biden administration. The leaders of the US, Japan and the Philippines on Thursday agreed to advance their defense and economic cooperation, in a move aimed at pushing back against China's ambitions in the Indo-Pacific region alongside Australia, India, Canada, and South Korea. US president Joe Biden, Japanese prime minister Fumio Kishida and Philippine President Bongbong Marcos expressed "serious concerns" about China's "dangerous and aggressive" actions in the South China Sea in a statement released after the first-ever summit between leaders of the three countries, held in Washington D.C. Kishida was invited to speak to the US Congress on 11 April 2024.

==== France ====
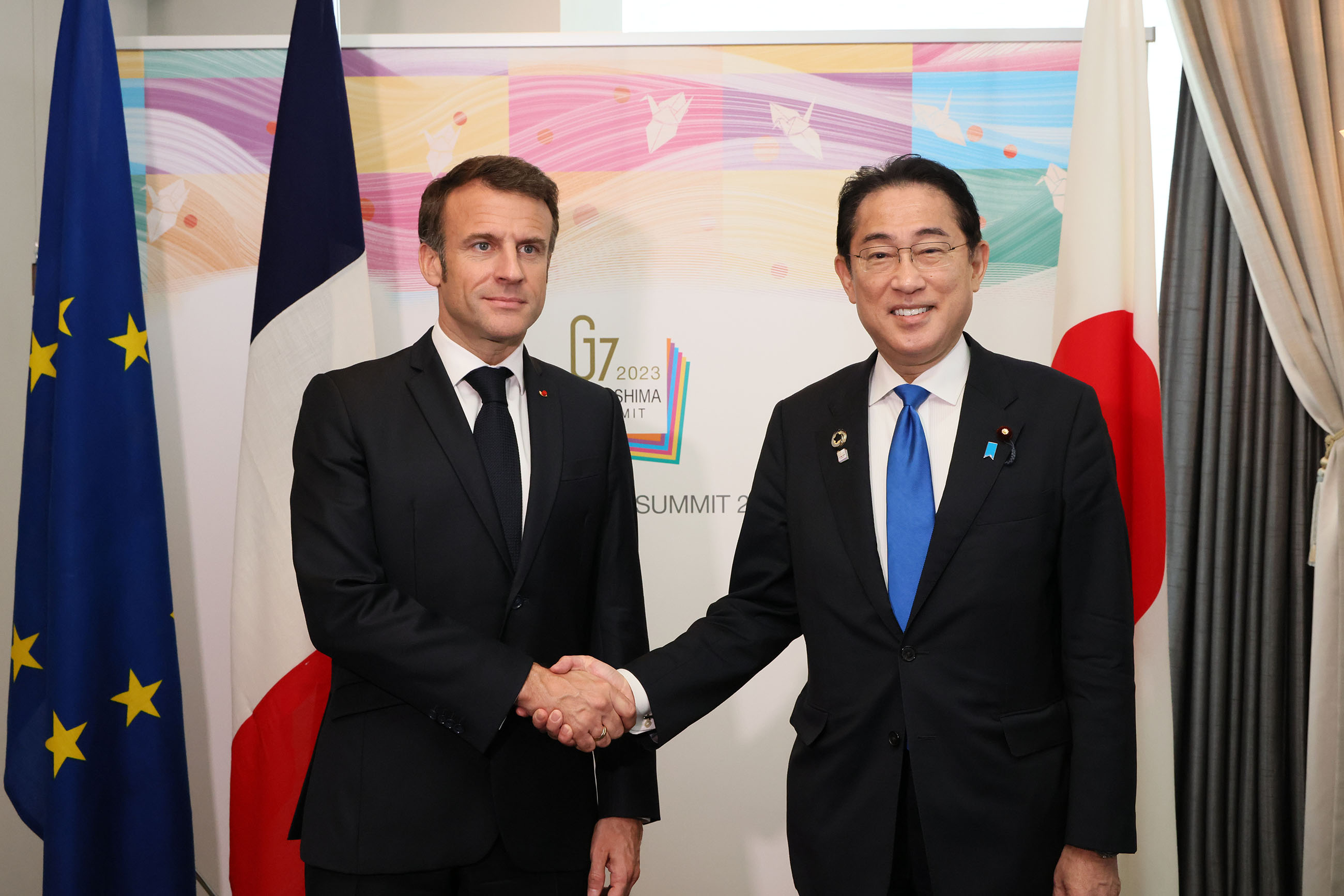
Kishida meets President Emmanuel Macron at the 49th G7 summit in Hiroshima, May 2023.

On relations between Japan and France, both Kishida and French president Emmanuel Macron have taken steps to call security demands and counterterrorist measures, amid preparations for the 2024 Summer Olympics in Paris and marked the 165th anniversary of the bilateral relations. Both the countries condemned the Russian invasion of Ukraine and the Gaza war, which involved a defense pact friendly understanding between two countries. It aimed to settle territorial disputes and to encourage cooperation against perceived Iranian and Russian pressure during the ongoing Iran–Israel conflict.

Following the state visit to France, Japan is planning to begin talks with France on a new security agreement to facilitate joint exercises and disaster relief operations, government sources for the incoming Olympics. Kishida pledged to take the lead in formulating global regulations on the appropriate use of generative AI technology through a new framework involving like-minded nations. In a speech at a session of the OECD in Paris, Kishida expressed his appreciation for the launch earlier in the day of the grouping, which aims to bring more participants into the AI initiative agreed upon at the G7 summit he hosted last year. Following Mitsui Fudosan and Vinci SA signed the former Tsukiji fish market redevelopment project, which includes building a multi-purpose stadium and a new central business district alongside Shiodome.

On 2 May 2024, Kishida and Macron agreed to initiate negotiations on a reciprocal access agreement so the two countries can facilitate closer defense cooperation such as joint exercises and disaster relief operations. Japan has RAAs with Australia and the UK, enabling their defense forces to smoothly access each other's territory for diverse purposes. Additionally, it has agreed with the Philippines to initiate talks for such an accord. Japan and France have already signed separate deals to expand their security cooperation, including an acquisition and cross-servicing agreement which simplifies the process of sharing food, fuel and ammunition between their forces.

==== Korea ====
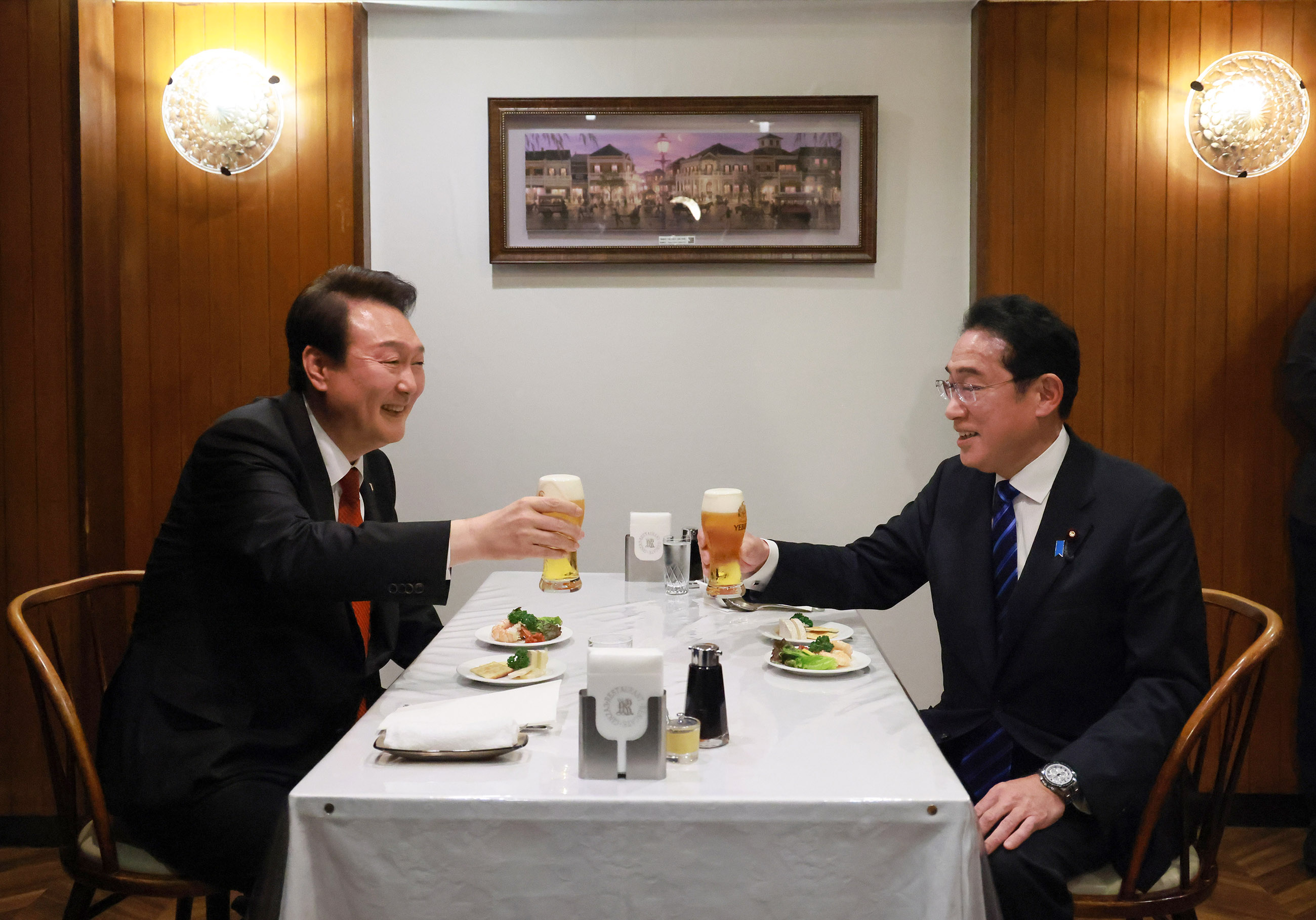
Kishida meeting with South Korean president Yoon Suk Yeol in 2023

On relations between Japan and South Korea, both Kishida and South Korean president Yoon Suk-yeol have taken steps to mend and expand ties, while attempting to settle historical issues stemming from World War II and the Japanese occupation of Korea. In remarks on 1 March 2023, Yoon said that Japan had gone from 'aggressor to partner'. On 16 March 2023 Kishida held a summit with Yoon in Tokyo to settle war time labor disputes, among other issues.

On 7 May 2023, Kishida arrived in Seoul for a two-day trip to South Korea. The reciprocal trip was the first between leaders of Japan and South Korea in 12 years. During his visit, Yoon said that the historical issues had to be "completely settled". While in Seoul, Kishida expressed sympathies to Koreans who lived under the Japanese Empire. Kishida was criticized by some in South Korea for not directly apologizing during the meeting. The meetings were praised by US president Joe Biden, calling it a "groundbreaking new chapter of cooperation and partnership" between both nations.

Kishida invited President Yoon to attend the 49th G7 summit in Hiroshima as an invitee. President Biden also invited Kishida and Yoon to meet in Washington, D.C., during the G7 Hiroshima summit for further talks. Kishida met with Yoon and Biden on 18 August during a historic summit hosted by Biden at Camp David in the United States. The three announced the Camp David Principles, a set of strategies to counter the influence of China, North Korea, and Russia as well as limit the risk of economic disruptions in the future. All three nations agreed to further expand military ties, which involved intelligence sharing, annual military drills, and a wider security pact. Biden again praised both leaders for their "political courage ... to work together". The summit additionally reaffirmed a shared goal of a "free and open Indo-Pacific", a concept first introduced by Prime Minister Shinzo Abe in 2016. During the summit, Kishida also promised Biden $2 million in relief aid for the wildfires in Hawaii. The summit was a first of its kind and was hailed as the beginning of a new era by the US.

In 2024, it was reported that Kishida was seeking a meeting with high level North Korean officials. A direct meeting between Kishida and Kim Jong Un would be the first of its kind in over twenty years. Kishida had previously stated in May 2023 that "I am determined to face Kim Jong Un directly myself, without any preconditions," and settle the issue of the North Korean abductions of Japanese citizens. Hopes for the summit were buoyed by North Korean condolences after the 2024 Noto earthquake. Such plans are considered to be highly controversial in South Korea, particularly with president Yoon Suk Yeol, who has taken a hardline stance on North Korea compared to former president Moon Jae-in. It was also said that the plans were an attempt to boost Kishida's domestic popularity, which had been in decline.

==== Africa ====
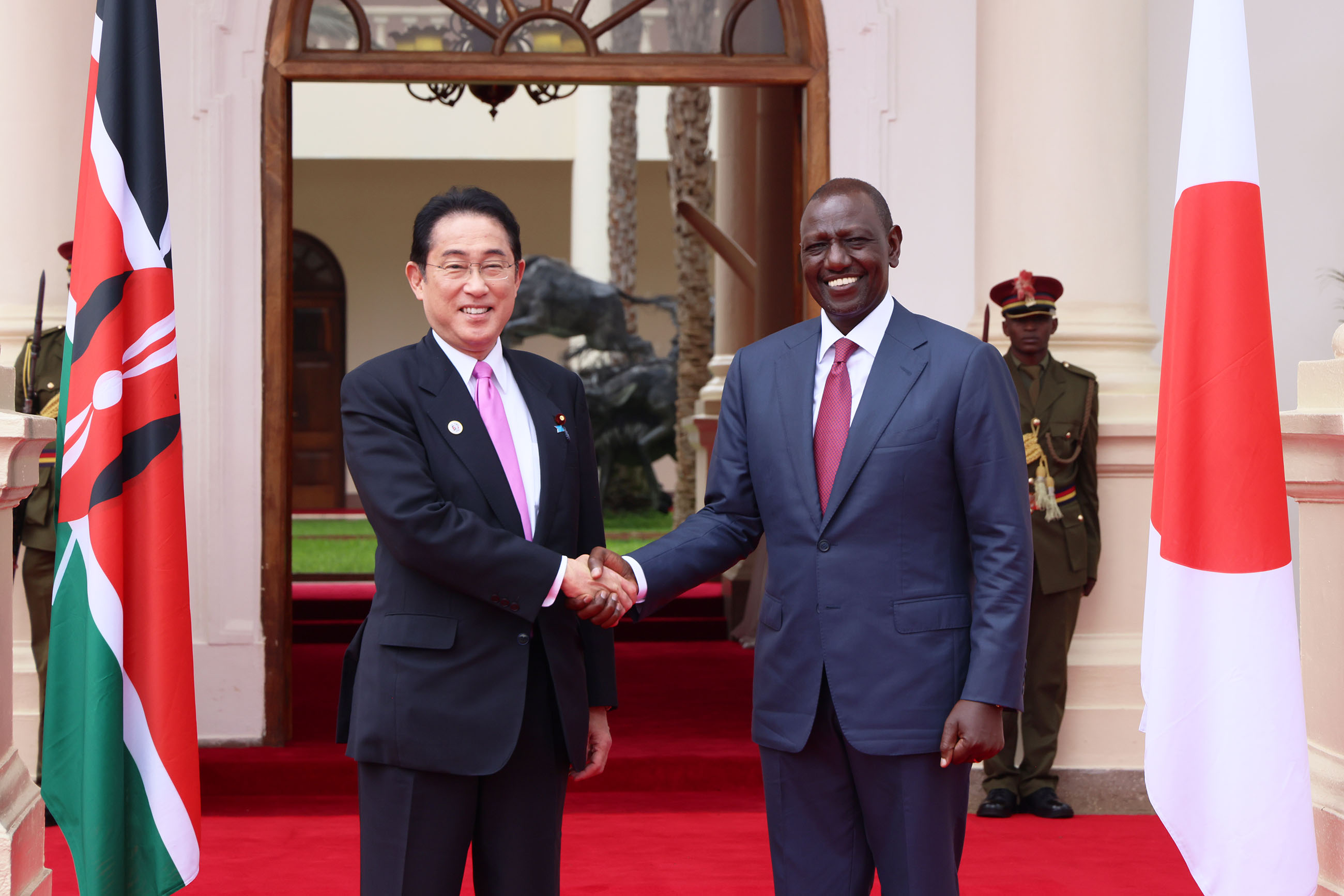
Kishida with Kenyan President William Ruto, 2 May 2023

Kishida has attempted to deepen ties between Japan and African nations, while also promoting peace and stability in the region. In August 2022, while addressing a summit in Tunisia, Kishida promised $30 billion in aid for the development of African countries for the next 3 years. Later on 30 April 2023, Kishida began an African tour and visited the League of Arab States based in Egypt, and met with President Abdel Fattah el-Sisi; Kishida offered a yen loan to fund a metro line project in Cairo.

On 1 May, Kishida visited Ghana. During a meeting with President Nana Akufo-Addo, Kishida emphasized the importance of Japanese investment in the country, and bilateral relations in the international arena. Ghana and Japan both agreed to pursue reforms in the UN Security Council as well. While in Ghana, Kishida pledged $500 million in more financial aid to Africa, in perceived contrast from China's Belt and Road Initiative in the continent. On 3 May, Kishida arrived in the Kenyan capital Nairobi. He met with Kenyan President William Ruto, who agreed to deepen cooperation and to bolster economic and energy ties. The two condemned Russian invasion of Ukraine, and reiterated their desire for a peaceful Indo-Pacific. Kishida announced that Japan would continue to give assistance for infrastructure in Kenya. Ruto and Kishida signed an agreement allowing Kenyans to access jobs in Japan, bolstering economic relations.

=== Assassination of Shinzo Abe and cabinet reshuffle ===
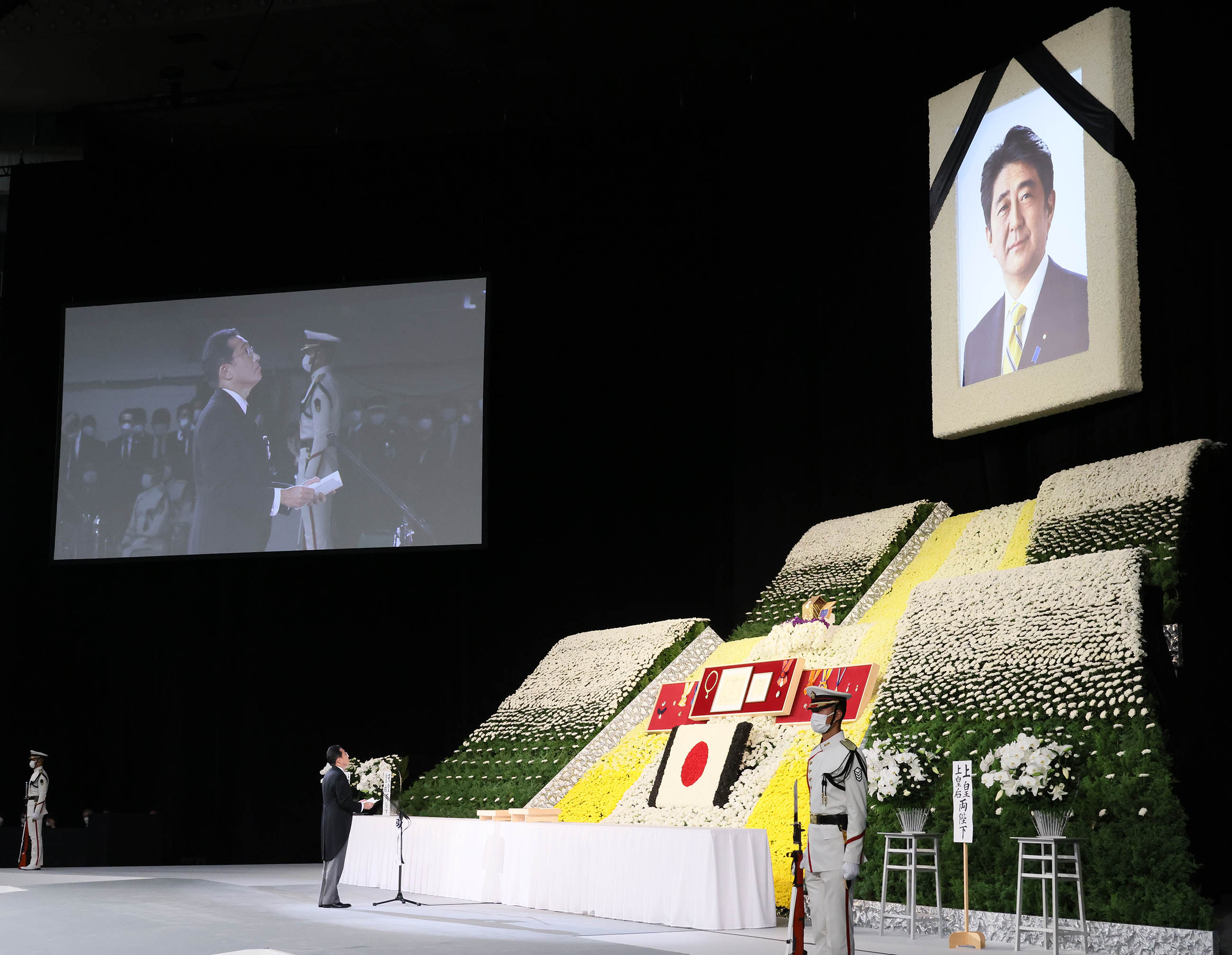
Kishida delivering the memorial address at the state funeral of Shinzo Abe

After the assassination of Shinzo Abe on 8 July 2022, Kishida condemned the assassination, but refused to suspend political campaigning so as to demonstrate that democracy would not be impeded by violence. He later blamed insufficient police protection for allowing the murder to occur. Because of media reports on the ties between the LDP and the Unification Church, a Korean cult accused of scamming Japanese followers (including the suspect's mother) out of much of their wealth, Kishida reshuffled his Cabinet on 10 August 2022, which included removing Abe's brother, Nobuo Kishi, from the role of minister of defense. Taro Kono was made the Minister of Digital Affairs. While the majority of members of the LDP, including Shinzo Abe and Nobuo Kishi, were related to the church to various degrees, there were no evidences of Kishida having any direct tie with the church or any of its affiliated entities.

It was reported in 1 September issue of Shūkan Bunshun that Mineo Nakayama, the president of a Kumamoto circle for backing Kishida's bid for the premiership, was also a chairperson of a Unification Church-affiliated group which was advocating for building the Japan-Korea Undersea Tunnel. Both Kishida and Nakayama denied any knowledge of the tunnel advocacy group being related to the Unification Church. On 4 December 2023, Kishida denied having knowledge about the involvement of Newt Gingrich and Masayoshi Kajikuri with the Unification Church during a meeting in October 2019, arranged by Abe. Gingrich, the former US House Speaker, is also known as a strong supporter of the Unification Church. On the other hand, Kajikuri is the chairman of numerous organizations associated with the church. Kajikuri was known to have invited Abe to a 2021 online conference held by one of the fronts of the church, Universal Peace Federation, and that particular appearance is cited as one of the major reasons that drove a church victim, Tetsuya Yamagami, into assassinating Abe in July 2022.

=== Attempted assassination ===
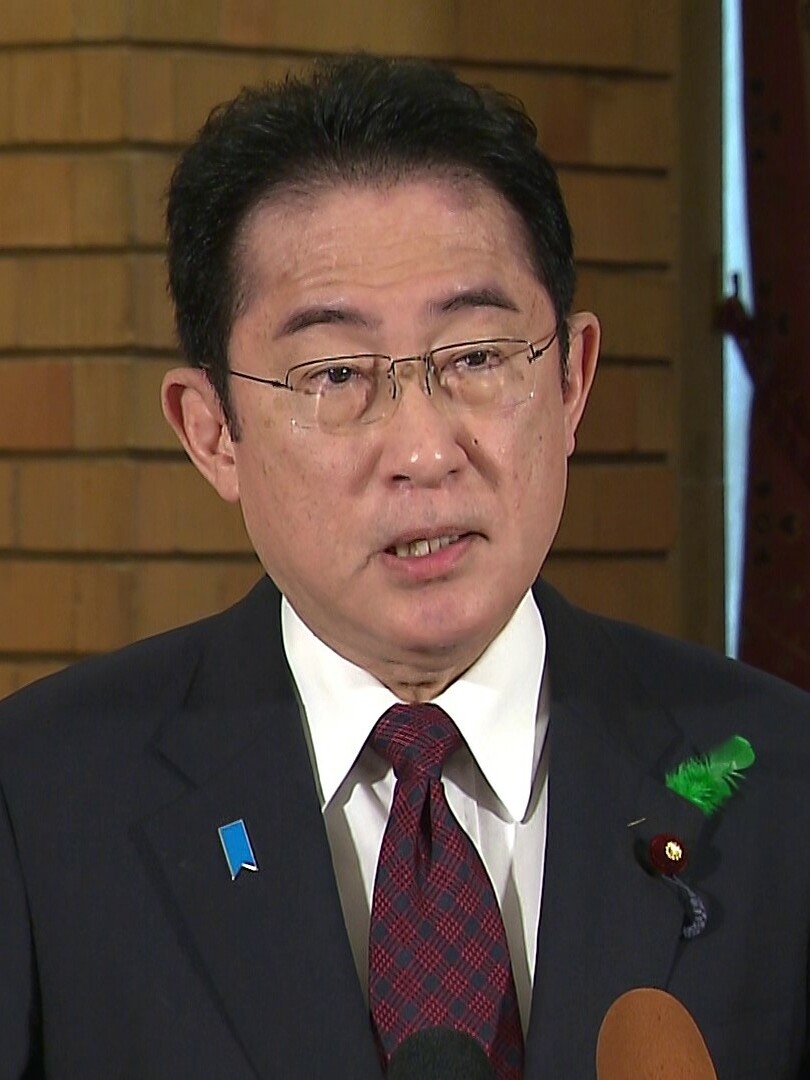
Kishida (the day after the attack) during a press conference

On 15 April 2023, a man threw a cylindrical explosive device at Kishida shortly before he was due to make a campaign speech in Wakayama. The device exploded after a short delay during which Kishida was evacuated from the scene unharmed. Ryuji Kimura, a 24-year-old man from Hyogo Prefecture, was arrested at the scene, with cameras showing him holding what appeared to be a second cylindrical object as he was tackled to the ground. The incident took place as Kishida was talking with a candidate of the ruling Liberal Democratic Party just before his scheduled speech. Kishida immediately left by car after the incident and continued with his stump speech elsewhere in the city. He stated at an event later in the day that "elections are a bedrock of democracy," adding that it was extremely unforgivable that such violence took place. Kimura was indicted by Wakayama prosecutors on 7 September 2023 for attempted murder, among other charges and was sentenced to ten years' imprisonment on 19 February 2025.

=== LDP funds scandal ===
After news leaked in December of a slush fund scandal involving several Abe faction ministers and senior party leaders, including Yasutoshi Nishimura and Kōichi Hagiuda, Kishida sacked several of his own ministers involved in the scandal, including Nishimura along with Hirokazu Matsuno and a group of other Abe faction members. Along with this, further members of the faction resigned from their posts in the House of Representatives. It is believed that the Abe faction hid away over 500 million yen worth of money over five years. Kishida pledged to "work like a ball of fire" to regain public trust after news broke. Kishida also announced his resignation as the head of Kōchikai and announced he will leave the faction while he serves as premier. In mid-January, it was revealed that Kishida's own faction, the Kōchikai, failed to declare 30 million yen in fundraising from parties over a three-year period. Kishida told the media it was a result of "clerical errors". Kishida is not expected to face prosecution for the error.

Despite public belief hitting 91% that the LDP and Kishida would not undertake any change, the prime minister made an announcement at which he pledged to dissolve his own faction and announced support for other factions of the LDP to be dissolved as well. The Abe faction followed shortly over. However, Kishida's pledge did not gain party-wide support, Shikōkai, the third largest-grouping inside the party led by former prime minister Tarō Asō, and Heisei Kenkyūkai, led by LDP General Secretary Toshimitsu Motegi, defied Kishida's will and did not disband. Both Aso and Motegi stated their intention to turn both of their factions into policy groups in late January. Kishida has also come under fire for Minister of Education, Culture, Sports, Science and Technology Masahito Moriyama ties to the Unification Church, the same group which dogged Kishida's approvals early on in his term. Moriyama was unable to recall his ties to the Church and if he had received funding from them before the 2021 general election. Despite calls to fire him, Kishida has refused and Moriyama survived the no confidence vote on 20 February 2024. Kishida and his LDP lost all three seats up for election in the 2024 Japan by-elections, which were previously held by LDP members or LDP affiliated independents. He denied he would step down after results came in.

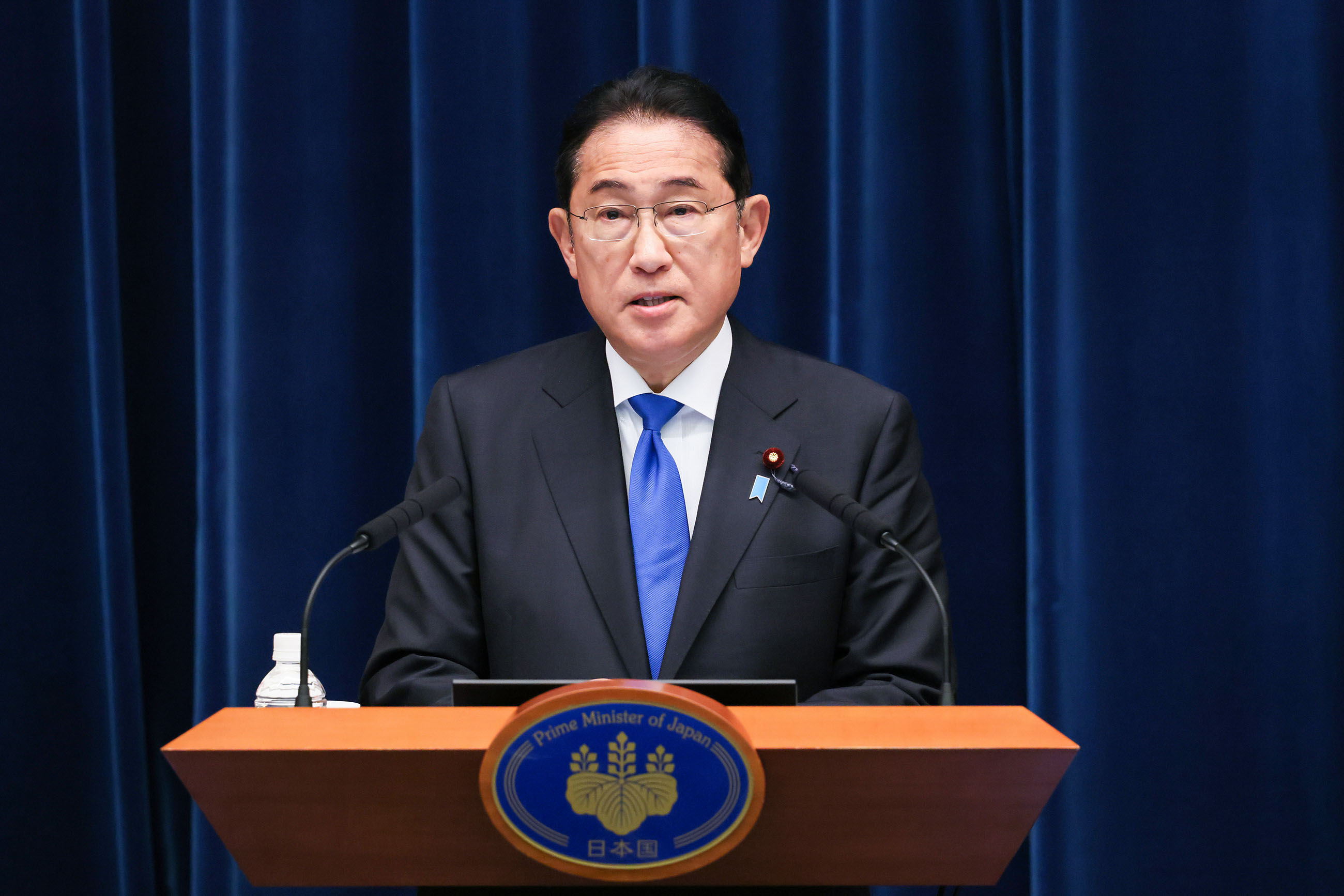
Kishida announced his intention to resign as Prime Minister on 14 August 2024

=== Resignation ===
On 14 August 2024, Kishida announced that he would no longer seek second term as president of the LDP in elections due in September, which would also effectively end his tenure as prime minister. Kishida said that he was withdrawing in order for the party to have an "open contest to promote debate" and "to show the people that the LDP is changing". In the LDP leadership election Kishida initially endorsed Chief Cabinet Secretary Yoshimasa Hayashi, then in the second round he whipped votes for Shigeru Ishiba, who defeated Sanae Takaichi to become the next party leader and prime minister.

Kishida Cabinet approval ratings since 2021.

=== Public approval ===
In early November 2023, a Jiji Press survey showed his cabinet's approval rating falling to 21.3%, the lowest since Tarō Asō in 2008. It further fell to 17.1% in December. Despite his attempts at reform during the slush fund scandal, polls report his cabinet's approval rating as low as 25%, with only 1% of people polled highly approving of his response, and 4% approving highly of his reforms. A Mainichi Shimbun poll in mid-February highlighted his approval rating at 14%, only .6% better than Tarō Asō shortly before the landside DPJ victory in 2009, which also served as the worst modern recorded approval rating. Jiji displayed his approval rating at 16.6%, the lowest tabulated for him from Jiji, with a clear majority stating dissatisfaction for the punishments distributed due to the slush fund scandal.
