= Teesta water dispute =

Bangladesh-India geopolitical dispute

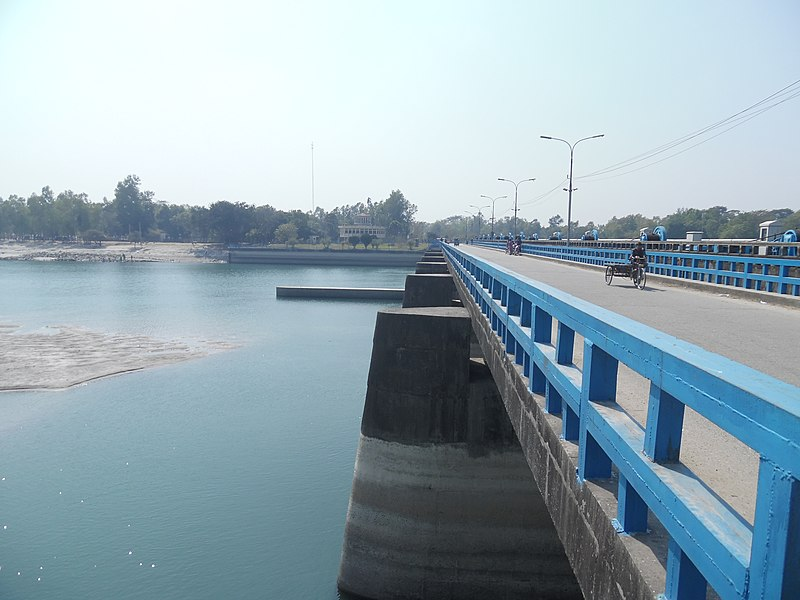
The Teesta Barrage represents a critical point of geopolitical tension between Bangladesh and India, where upstream water control by India impacts Bangladesh's water security, affecting regional stability and cross-border relations in South Asia.

The Teesta Water Dispute involves a geopolitical challenge between India and Bangladesh regarding the allocation of the Teesta River's water resources. Originating in Sikkim, India, and flowing through West Bengal before entering Bangladesh, the Teesta River spans 414 kilometers and is important for agriculture and irrigation, particularly in northern Bangladesh. This river supports the livelihoods of many in the region and is a critical factor in the broader diplomatic relations between the two countries, underscoring the need for collaborative water management strategies.

== Historical background ==
The dispute over the Teesta River dates back to the partition of India in 1947, when the river's catchment areas became divided between India and Bangladesh. The issue resurfaced after Bangladesh gained independence in 1971. In 1983, a temporary water-sharing agreement was made between the two nations, giving India 39% of the river's water and Bangladesh 36%. However, this arrangement was never formalized into a permanent treaty, and discussions have since been ongoing.

Efforts to secure a comprehensive agreement progressed in 2011, with a draft treaty that proposed allocating 37.5% of the Teesta's water to Bangladesh during the dry season. However, opposition from West Bengal's Chief Minister, Mamata Banerjee, citing concerns about water scarcity in her state, stalled the agreement. This internal political dynamic in India has posed a significant challenge to resolving the dispute.

== Geopolitical significance ==
The Teesta River is critical to both India and Bangladesh. In Bangladesh, the river supports agriculture in the Teesta Basin, where water shortages have severely impacted agricultural productivity. According to the International Food Policy Research Institute (IFPRI), Bangladesh loses approximately 1.5 million tons of rice annually due to the water shortage, with future losses expected to rise.

In India, particularly in the state of West Bengal, the Teesta is vital for irrigation and power generation. Several hydropower projects are located in the river's upper catchment areas, and nearly half a dozen districts in North Bengal depend on its waters. The dispute illustrates the difficulty of balancing domestic needs with international water-sharing agreements, especially in the face of political opposition within India.

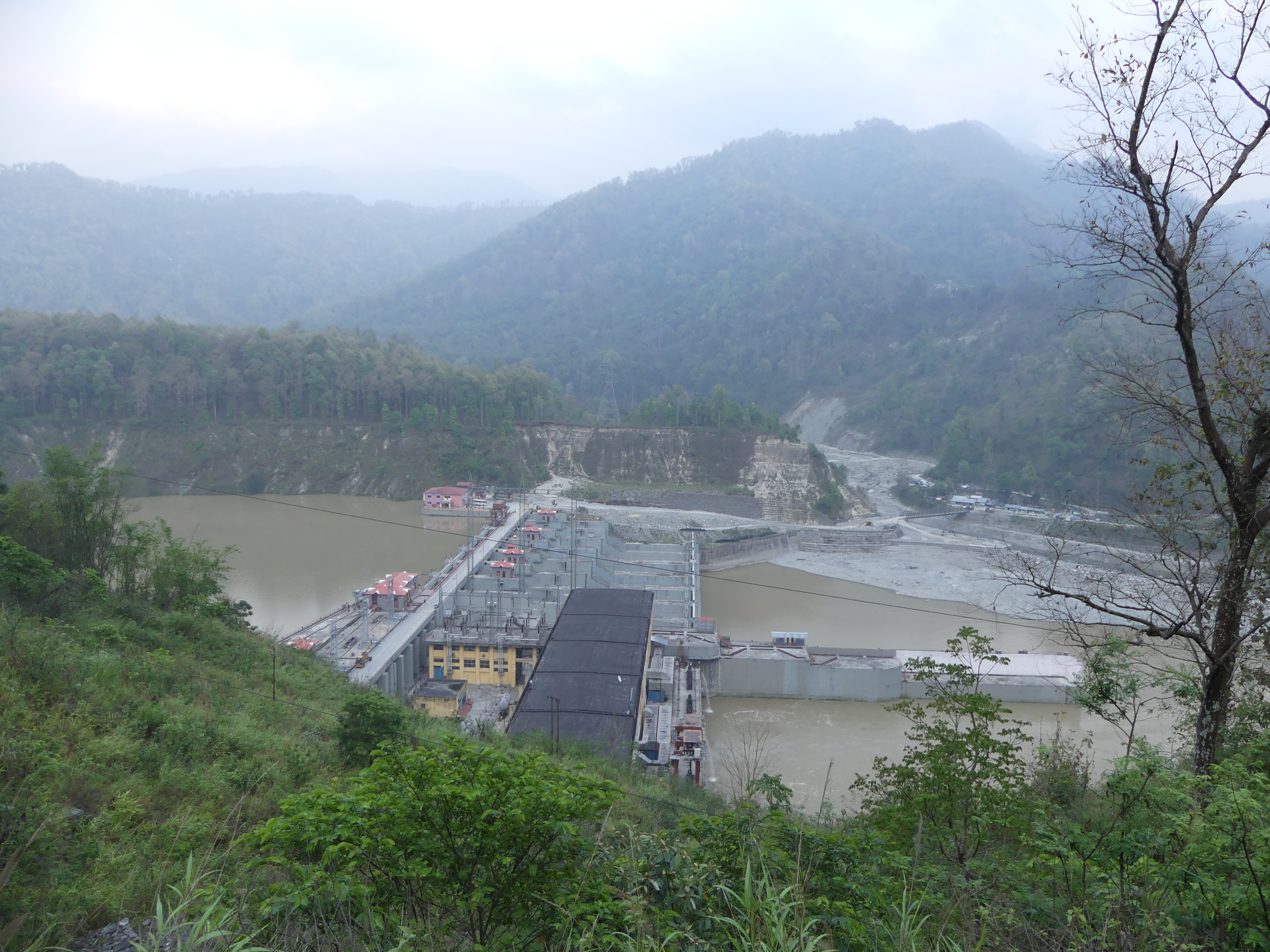
The Teesta Low Dam - III highlights the river's role in India-Bangladesh water-sharing disputes, affecting regional energy and security dynamics.

The construction of India's Gazoldoba Barrage, upstream of the Tista Barrage in Bangladesh, has significantly impacted water flow and intensified the Teesta Water Dispute between the two nations. This dispute has broader geopolitical implications, as water scarcity in Bangladesh could affect regional stability, influencing both India's northeastern states and the overall water-sharing dynamics in South Asia. The Teesta River's water management remains a critical issue in the context of Bangladesh-India relations and regional cooperation.

== Recent developments ==
In 2024, the Teesta dispute resurfaced following the resignation of Bangladesh's pro-Indian Prime Minister Sheikh Hasina. The interim government, led by Nobel laureate Muhammad Yunus, prioritized resuming talks with India on the Teesta River issue. Syeda Rizwana Hasan, water resources adviser to the interim government, reaffirmed Bangladesh's commitment to advancing the Teesta water-sharing agreement. After meeting with a World Bank delegation, she emphasized that Bangladesh would assert its rights over the river while engaging with the local population.

== Challenges ==
The Teesta Barrage Project in India is designed to improve water supply for agriculture in six northern districts of West Bengal and generate 67.50 MW of hydropower. The project includes the Teesta Barrage, Mahananda Barrage, and extensive Canal systems|canal systems. Significant progress has been made in the construction of the barrages and canal distribution systems, enhancing the region's irrigation and hydropower capabilities.

In Bangladesh, the Teesta remains essential for agriculture, supporting millions of farmers in six districts. A fair water-sharing agreement is crucial for ensuring food security and economic stability. The evolving political landscape in Bangladesh, under the interim government of Muhammad Yunus, offers renewed opportunities for negotiations on the Teesta treaty. However, Bangladesh faces diplomatic challenges in balancing its relations with both India and China, particularly regarding the $1 billion Teesta River project backed by China. While China offers infrastructure development, India is concerned about the strategic security implications and seeks to limit China's influence in the region. According to Dr. Lailufar Yasmin, professor of international relations at the University of Dhaka, Teesta Project is a "litmus test" for Bangladesh in its relations with India and China.

The evolving geopolitics of the Bengal Basin, with the U.S. expressing concerns about regional dominance, underscores Bangladesh's strategic importance within the broader Indo-Pacific framework.

== See also ==
- Teesta River
- Bengal Basin
