= Free and Open Indo-Pacific =

Indo-Pacific strategies of countries with similar interests in the region

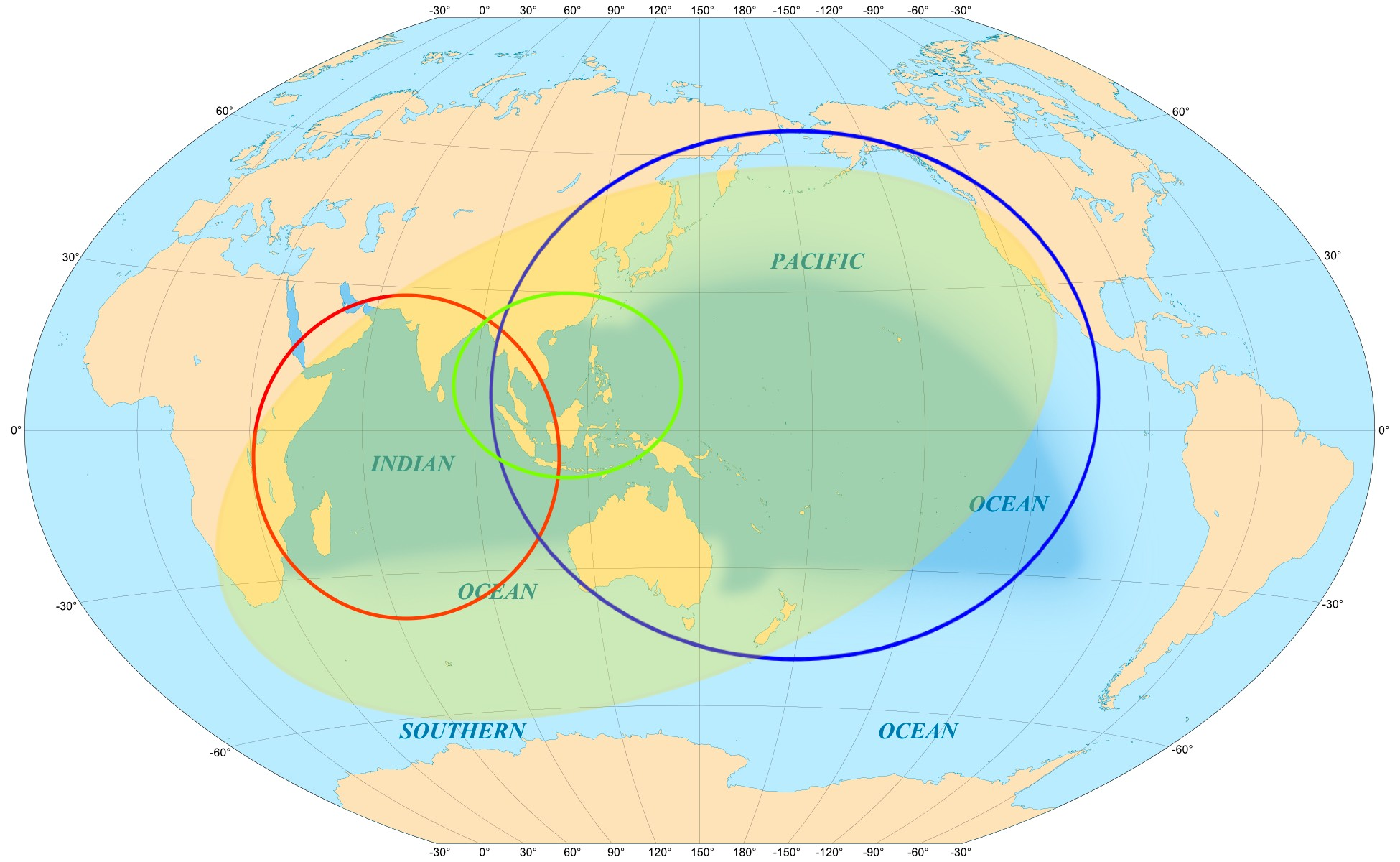
Indo-Pacific. The green circle covers ASEAN.

Free and Open Indo-Pacific (FOIP; Japanese: 自由で開かれたインド太平洋, romanized: jiyū de hirakareta Indotaiheiyō) is an umbrella term that encompasses Indo-Pacific-specific strategies of countries with similar interests in the region. The concept, with its origins in the geopolitics of the Weimar Republic, has been revived since 2006 through Japanese initiatives and American cooperation.

Prime Minister Shinzo Abe of Japan introduced the FOIP concept and formally put it down as a strategy in 2016. In 2019 the United States Department of State published a document formalizing its concept of a free and open Indo-Pacific. Since then, multiple countries in regions from the European Union to Southeast Asia have referred to the Indo-Pacific in national security or foreign policy documents.

== Origin ==
Historians and political scientists have shown that the "Indo-Pacific" emerged in the context of Weimar Republic geopolitics in the 1920s–1930s, and since then spread to Japan through Karl Haushofer's intervention. Haushofer's designation of the Indo-Pacific as a geopolitical region arose from his global strategy based on the German-Japanese "Pan-region" rule, to oppose the "British and U.S. colonial control of the Indian Ocean and the Western Pacific regions". During the inter-war period, Japan also embraced the concept of "Greater East Asia", leading to invasions in the Philippines, China, and Southeast Asia.

Lewis Tambs, National Security Council at the White House and diplomat under the Reagan presidency, updated and wrote its preface to the 2002 publication.

During 2006–07 when Taro Aso was foreign minister, the Japanese government presented the idea of "Arc of Freedom and Prosperity".

In August 2007, Prime Minister Shinzo Abe's speech in the Parliament of India included the following:

"We are now at a point at which the Confluence of the Two Seas is coming into being. The Pacific and the Indian Oceans are now bringing about a dynamic coupling as seas of freedom and of prosperity."

It was the base model of FOIP according to Keiichi Ichikawa, the diplomat who had been in charge of Abe's Policy Coordination Division, and Katsuyuki Yakushiji, one of the consulted experts.

According to the Japanese Ministry of Foreign Affairs (MOFA), Abe first officially explained Japan's commitment to the FOIP strategy in Kenya on 27 August 2016.

However, even before then, the concept of FOIP also fell in place with Abe's thinking of "diplomacy that takes a panoramic perspective of the world map". In 2012, Abe's first elucidation of FOIP went as follows:

"Peace, stability, and freedom of navigation in the Pacific Ocean are inseparable from peace, stability, and freedom of navigation in the Indian Ocean. Japan, as one of the oldest sea-faring democracies in Asia, should play a greater role—alongside Australia, India, and the US—in preserving the common good in both regions"

== Indo-Pacific-specific strategies ==
=== Japan's diplomatic implementation ===
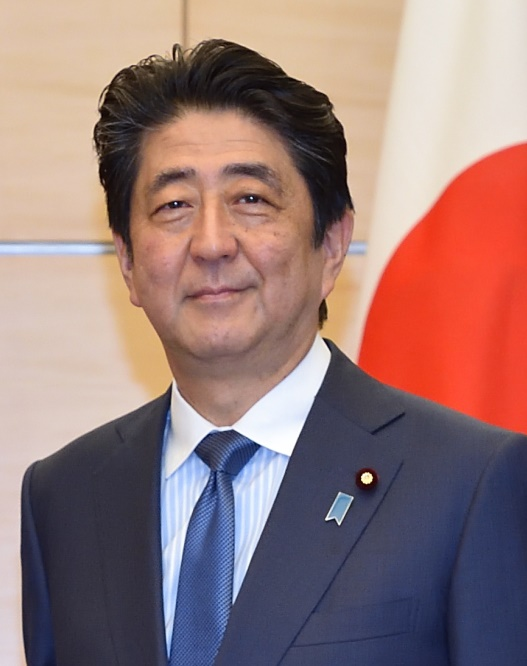
Shinzo Abe, Prime Minister of Japan (2012-2020).

In January 2013, the Japanese government had prepared a PM Abe's speech on "Five New Principles" to be delivered in Jakarta. However, as PM Abe had to go back to Japan before the scheduled date to respond to In Amenas hostage crisis, the speech was not realized; instead its script was made available.

In 2015, to implement the framework, Japan upgraded "The Guidelines for Japan-U.S. Defense Cooperation" with US, agreed and shared "Japan and India Vision 2025 Special Strategic and Global Partnership" with India, agreed and shared "Next steps of the Special Strategic Partnership: Asia, Pacific and Beyond" with Australia, and the quadrilateral framework was prepared.

In November 2017, President of the United States Donald Trump visited Japan, and summit meeting was held with PM Abe. Regarding regional and global affairs, the two leaders discussed on "Free and Open Indo-Pacific Strategy", and affirmed that Japan and the United States will work together to promote peace and prosperity in the region by developing the Indo-Pacific as free and open and directed relevant ministers and institutions to flesh out detailed cooperation, in particular, in the following areas:

- Promotion and establishment of fundamental values (rule of law, freedom of navigation, etc.)
- Pursuit of economic prosperity (improvement of connectivity, etc.)
- Commitment for peace and stability (capacity building on maritime law enforcement, etc.)

On 10 February 2023, PM Fumio Kishida oversaw the signing of several defense pacts and investment deals with President Bongbong Marcos of the Philippines; Marcos also announced he was considering opening tripartite defense talks with the United States and Japan. On 20 March 2023, Kishida, who visited New Delhi, India, delivered a policy speech entitled "the Future of the Indo-Pacific—Japan's New Plan for a `Free and Open Indo-Pacific'– `Together with India, as an Indispensable Partner'" at the Indian Council of World Affairs (ICWA), announcing Japan's new plan for a "Free and Open Indo-Pacific (FOIP)".

On May 2 2026, PM Sanae Takaichi, who was visiting Hanoi, Vietnam, delivered a foreign policy speech, announcing Japan's Updated "Free and Open Indo-Pacific (FOIP)", and outlined three priority areas for the FOIP. These are: "Building economic infrastructure for the age of AI and data including strengthening supply chain resilience for energy and critical materials", "Co-creation of economic growth opportunities through public-private collaboration and rule sharing" and "Enhancing cooperation in the field of security to ensure regional peace and stability".

=== India's foreign policy ===
In June 2018, PM Narendra Modi articulated India's vision towards the "Indo-Pacific region" for the first time. A central feature of Indian PM Modi's foreign policy has been to advance the need to create a "free, open, and inclusive" Indo-Pacific.

According to defense minister Rajnath Singh, the Indian government stands for a free, open and rules-based Indo-Pacific as it is important for economic development of the region and the wider global community.

=== The United States's Indo-Pacific strategy ===
On 18 October 2017, The United States Secretary of State Rex Tillerson delivered remarks speech at CSIS, explicitly using the term "free and open Indo-Pacific". And in the 2017 US National Security Strategy, "Asia-Pacific" was exchanged with "Indo-Pacific".

On 30 May 2018, The United States Pacific Command (USPACOM) is also renamed the United States Indo-Pacific Command (USINDOPACOM).

The Biden administration states that it supports a "free and open Indo-Pacific strategy". In December 2021, Secretary of State Antony Blinken delivered a speech on the United States' approach to the Indo-Pacific in Jakarta. On 23 May 2022, the administration released an Indo-Pacific Economic Framework. It was 12 paragraphs long and did not contain concrete details.

In November 2023, the United States halted plans for the IPEF's trade component. The Biden administration had intended to conclude the negotiations during the Asia-Pacific Economic Cooperation forum, but reversed course following opposition from Democratic members of Congress including Sherrod Brown.

=== Australia's foreign policy ===
In the 2017 Foreign Policy White Paper, a stable and prosperous Indo–Pacific is described as the most important Australia's interest, and Indo–Pacific democracies are described as of first order importance to Australia.

=== New Zealand's strategic direction ===
In October 2021, the New Zealand Ministry of Foreign Affairs and Trade (MFAT) published the MFAT Strategic Intentions 2021-2025 which describes "seven strategic goals". For the Indo-Pacific, the MFAT's goal is:

"Embed Aotearoa New Zealand as an active and integral partner in shaping an Indo-Pacific order that delivers regional stability and economic integration."

"Free and Open Indo-Pacific constructs", "free and open trade" and "free and open regional development" are also described in the document.

=== Fiji's Ocean of Peace declaration ===
In 2023, Fiji's Prime Minister, Sitiveni Rabuka, proposed a visionary initiative, the "Ocean of Peace" declaration, and it was endorsed at the Pacific Islands Forum Leaders Meeting in September 2025.

At the Japan-Fiji summit meeting and signing ceremony in November 2025, the "Ocean of Peace" declaration was regarded to share the same principles as the "Free and Open Indo-Pacific (FOIP)" such as respect for sovereignty and maintaining a rules-based international order, and the two leaders affirmed their cooperation toward the realization of a FOIP.

=== Canada's Indo-Pacific strategy ===
In November 2022, Canada launched the Indo-Pacific Strategy to support long-term growth, prosperity, and security for Canadians.

=== The United Kingdom's strategic framework ===
After Brexit in 2020, the UK Government expressed its wish to participate in promoting a free and open Indo-Pacific, reflected in its Integrated Review Refresh 2023.

At the annual Shangri-La Dialogue of 2025, the United Kingdom has reinforced its long-term strategic commitment to the Indo-Pacific region, emphasising the critical importance of enhancing security cooperation and defence partnerships across this vital geo political space.

=== ASEAN Outlook on the Indo-Pacific (AOIP) ===
In June 2019 at the 34th ASEAN Summit, they released ASEAN Outlook on the Indo-Pacific (AOIP), which is consistent with and anchored in the principles of ASEAN centrality through ASEANjournal-led mechanisms like the East Asia Summit (EAS). The AOIP was of Indonesia's proposal, and the document calls for dialogue, co-operation, inclusivity, and a rule-based framework, rather than rivalry. While accepting FOIP's basic idea that an ASEAN-led AOIP is "free and open," AOIP also considers "inclusiveness," which does not uniformly exclude China, and it is appropriate to understand that the "centrality of ASEAN" was emphasized as a device for that purpose.

=== Indonesia's Indo-Pacific Cooperation Concept ===
In May 2013, Indonesian Foreign Minister Marty Natalegawa made a speech on "An Indonesian perspective on the Indo-Pacific" at The Indonesia Conference hosted by the Center for Strategic and International Studies (CSIS) as keynote address.

At the CSIS Global Dialogue in May 2018 in Jakarta, Indonesian Foreign Minister Retno Marsudi unveiled the Indo-Pacific Cooperation Concept. The concept is based on the principles of being "open, transparent and inclusive, promoting the habit of dialogue, promoting cooperation and friendship, and upholding international law". And in August 2018, Retno formally presented the Indonesian Indo-Pacific Cooperation Concept to the 8th Ministerial Meeting of the East Asia Summit (EAS).

In November 2018, president Joko Widodo said that "The Indo-Pacific Cooperation Concept puts emphasis on several principles, including cooperation, instead of rivalry, inclusiveness, transparency and openness as well as respect for international law", at the 13th EAS plenary session held at the Suntec Singapore Convention and Exhibition Centre.

In March 2021, Second Japan-Indonesia Foreign and Defense Ministerial Meeting (2+2") was held, and the four Ministers shared the view that the ASEAN Outlook on the Indo-Pacific (AOIP) shares many relevant fundamental principles with the Free and Open Indo-Pacific (FOIP).

In November 2025, Third Japan-Indonesia Foreign and Defense Ministerial Meeting ("2+2") was held, and the four ministers confirmed their commitment to further reinforcing the cooperation between the two countries with a view to maintaining and strengthening the free and open international order based on the rule of law.

=== The Philippines' diplomatic strategy ===
While it has yet to produce a definitive Indo-Pacific strategy document as of April 2023, the administration of Bongbong Marcos has discussed intensifying cooperation with the U.S. government, whose officials have made agreements with the Philippines on energy, telecommunications, human rights, education, food security, and nuclear technology sales. In February 2023, Marcos briefly met with U.S. Defense Secretary Lloyd Austin to finalize an agreement to add U.S.-accessible Philippine military bases to the Enhanced Defense Cooperation Agreement allowing U.S. military visits. The Philippines also signed a defense agreement with Japan earlier that year, and Marcos announced that talks for a joint defense pact between Japan, the Philippines, and the United States are underway. The Philippines is also a prolific buyer of South Korean arms and military equipment, and has a long-standing security partnership with Australia and India.

In July 2024, "the Japan-Philippines Reciprocal Access Agreement (RAA)" was signed, and the RAA entered into force on 11 September 2025, providing a legal framework for the Japan Self-Defense Forces (JSDF) and the Armed Forces of the Philippines (AFP) to conduct joint training and disaster relief operations in each other's territory.

=== Palau's commitment to FOIP ===
In November 2024, The Japan Coast Guard (JCG) provided capacity-building assistance to the coast guard agency in Palau, promoting Japan's efforts toward the FOIP.

At the Japan-Palau Foreign Ministers' Meeting in October 2025, based on the spacial relationship between Palau and Japan, Foreign Minister Gustav Aitaro responded and committed to work closely with Japan toward the realization of a FOIP.

=== Bangladesh's Indo-Pacific outlook ===
In April 2023, the foreign ministry of Bangladesh formally announced its Indo-Pacific Outlook with 15 points which emphasized a "peaceful, secure and inclusive" Indo-Pacific. The Bangladeshi strategy promotes resilience in global value chains; food, water and energy security; freedom of navigation and overflight; maritime security and counter-terrorism; combating crime networks; nonproliferation, peacekeeping, sustainable development, SDG 14, and the "unimpeded and free flow of commerce in the Indo-Pacific".

Although Bangladesh is not a member of the Indo-Pacific Economic Framework for Prosperity (IPEF), it considers the framework vital for fostering stability, openness, and cooperation across the Indo-Pacific region, including the Bengal Basin, and for enhancing its economic growth through the Bay of Bengal.

=== South Korea's Indo-Pacific strategy ===
South Korea's approach to the Indo-Pacific is based on cooperation and complementarity between its New Southern Policy and the U.S.'s and the Quad's Indo-Pacific policy, but without openly antagonizing China. In this respect, South Korea is balancing the desire for foreign policy autonomy with the need for strategic alliances, above all with the United States.

In December 2022, South Korea released its "Strategy for a Free, Peaceful, and Prosperous Indo-Pacific Region," outlining its commitment to a rules-based international order, maritime cooperation, non-proliferation, and economic security.

With Lee Jae-myung's inauguration as South Korean president in June 2025, this Indo-Pacific strategy was expected to be scrapped.

=== NATO ===
In June 2022, the 2022 Madrid NATO summit was joined by the leaders of four Indo-Pacific nations: Australia, Japan, New Zealand, and South Korea, followed by summits in Vilnius (July 2023) and in the U.S. (October 2024).

Apart from the U.S., more recently other members of NATO have reoriented their maritime policy in defense of a Free and Open Indo-Pacific (FOIP).

=== Countries in the European Union ===
France's territories and EEZ, excluding Antarctic territories. A large proportion of France's overseas territories are located in the Indo-Pacific region.

In September 2021, the European Union published its Joint Communication on the EU's Indo-Pacific Strategy, which was based on the strategies of France, Germany and Netherlands.

France
France is an Indo-Pacific power because of the several territories of France located there. The administration of Emmanuel Macron released a strategy in 2019 which was subsequently updated in 2021.

Germany
Germany adopted policy guidelines for the region in September 2020.

Netherlands
In November 2020, the Netherlands published the white paper "Indo-Pacific: Guidelines for strengthening Dutch and EU cooperation with partners in Asia".

== Criticism ==
Political scientist Sharifah Munirah Alatas has argued that the origin of the term "Indo-Pacific" was Euro-centric, so it lacked the input of Asian countries in a broader anticolonial context. The Australian Citizens Party has publicly denounced the "Nazi roots" of the "Indo-Pacific" concept.

Chinese officials often criticize the "Indo-Pacific" concept and see it as a tool to contain China. China's partner, Russia, also echoes Chinese views, describing it as a "closed and exclusive group structure", and called for an "equal, open, and inclusive Asia-Pacific security system that does not target third countries".

== See also ==
- AUKUS
- Bangladesh and the Indo-Pacific Strategy
- CANZUK
- Comprehensive and Progressive Agreement for Trans-Pacific Partnership (CPTPP)
- Indo-Pacific
- Indo-Pacific Economic Framework (IPEF)
- Quadrilateral Security Dialogue (Quad)
- Shinzo Abe
- India-Japan relations
- India–United States relations
- Japan–United States relations
- List of islands in the Indian Ocean
- List of islands in the Pacific Ocean
