= Indo-Pacific Economic Framework =

Economic initiative led by the United States

Indo-Pacific Economic Framework for Prosperity
- Members of IPEF
- Type: Economic initiative
- Membership: 14 countries: Australia; Brunei; Fiji; India; Indonesia; Japan; Malaysia; New Zealand; Philippines; Singapore; South Korea; Thailand; United States; Vietnam

The Indo-Pacific Economic Framework for Prosperity (IPEF) is an economic initiative launched by U.S. President Joe Biden on May 23, 2022. The framework launched with fourteen participating founding member nations in the Indo-Pacific region with an open invitation for other countries to join.

== Background ==
=== Obama and Trump administration policies ===
During the presidency of Barack Obama (with Joe Biden as vice president), the United States negotiated a trade proposal with twelve Pacific Rim countries that would become known as the Trans-Pacific Partnership (TPP). In 2015, the Obama administration pitched the proposal as a means to promote American economic interests in the region in the face of a rising China.

Following his election in 2016 and subsequent inauguration, then-President Donald Trump issued an executive order pulling the United States out of the TPP, which had not been ratified by Congress. In 2018, the eleven remaining countries in the TPP went on to sign a revised version of the agreement, known as the Comprehensive and Progressive Agreement for Trans-Pacific Partnership.

=== Biden administration policy ===
Prior to the launch of the IPEF, critics argued that the U.S. was engaged in an “all guns and no butter” strategy, in which defense was emphasized over regional economic policy.

Commentators have described the IPEF as being part of the Biden administration's efforts to counter growing Chinese influence in the region. According to the Financial Times, countries in the region urged the Biden administration to develop an international economic policy framework to combat China's influence.

Analysts have compared it to the Trans-Pacific Partnership (TPP), which the United States withdrew from in 2017. The Biden administration stated that it has no intention to join TPP's successor, the Comprehensive and Progressive Agreement for Trans-Pacific Partnership. The IPEF is intended to be a precursor for later negotiations, as it does not include a uniform lowering of tariffs.

On 22 May 2022, the Biden administration issued a 12-paragraph IPEF. Biden described the initiative as "writing the new rules for the 21st century economy", stating that the agreement would make the participant's economies "grow faster and fairer". Secretary of Commerce Gina Raimondo argued that the framework constituted "the most significant international economic engagement that the United States has ever had in this region".

The pact has been described as being "hollow", "meaningless" or "useless" by some commentators, including US industry groups, due to its lack of tangible policy actions such as lowering tariffs. Writing in 2022, academics Xinru Ma and David C. Kang described IPEF as lacking concrete proposals.

==== Supply Chains ====
The Agreement Relating to Supply Chain Resilience was signed in November 2023, and entered into force in February 2024. The agreement establishes the Supply Chain Council, the Crisis Response Network and the Labor Rights Advisory Board to address supply chain resilience.

==== Clean Economy ====
The Clean Economy Agreement was signed in June 2024, and entered into force on October 11, 2024. The agreement includes measures on developing and deploying clean energy and climate-friendly technologies, facilitating investment towards climate-related projects in the region, connecting markets through policies and standards, and promoting low-and zero-emission goods and services.

==== Fair Economy ====
The Fair Economy Agreement was signed in June 2024, and entered into force on October 12, 2024. The agreement aims to prevent and combat corruption and to improve tax transparency and the exchange of information, domestic resource mobilization, and tax administration.

==== Trade ====
In November 2023, the United States halted plans for the IPEF's trade component. The Biden administration had intended to conclude the negotiations during the Asia-Pacific Economic Cooperation forum, but reversed course following opposition from Democratic members of Congress including Sherrod Brown.

== Participating nations ==
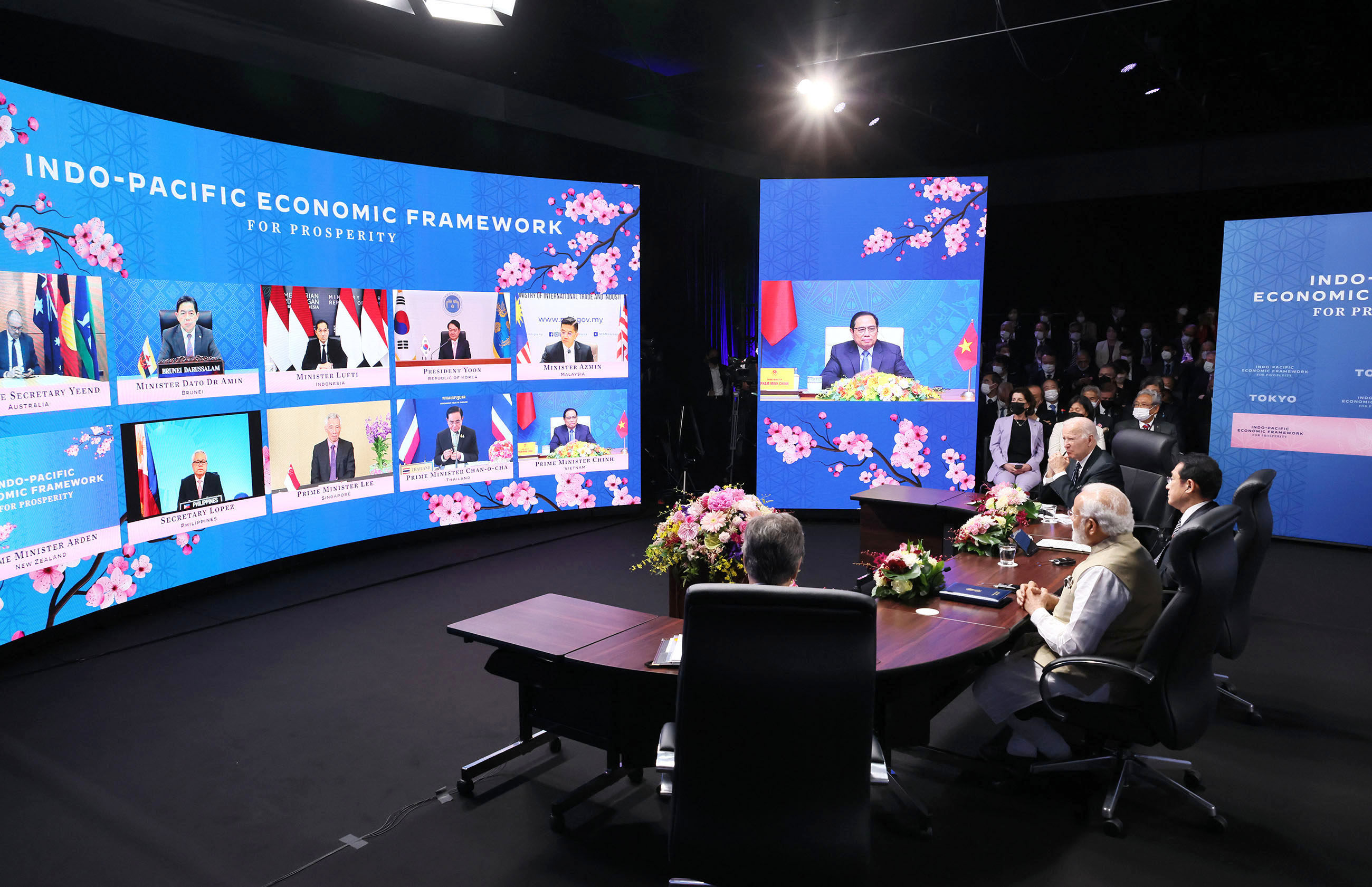
Summit-level meeting on the launch of the Indo-Pacific Economic Framework, 23 May 2022

=== Nations included in the framework ===
The IPEF has fourteen participating member states, representing around 40% of the world's GDP. Seven members of the IPEF are ASEAN (Association of Southeast Asian Nations) member states.

The 14th and most recent entry into the IPEF was Fiji, which was welcomed into the framework on May 27, 2023, as the first Pacific Island nation to join. Including the United States, the following member countries joined in the framework:

Member countries with the four largest GDPs:

- India (partly opted out on the trade pillar)
- Japan
- South Korea
- United States

Countries in Oceania:

- Australia
- Fiji
- New Zealand

ASEAN member states:

- Brunei
- Indonesia
- Malaysia
- Philippines
- Singapore
- Thailand
- Vietnam

=== Excluded or potential entrant nations ===
The following non-participating nations were subject to media attention surrounding their potential involvement in the IPEF:

- Canada: Canada was not among the nations included in the framework at the time of its launch. Since then, the country has sought admission into the IPEF, with trade minister Mary Ng claiming in December 2022 that the country's bid has the support of all constituent members.
- Taiwan: Taiwan (ROC) was not invited to join the IPEF.
- United Kingdom: In August 2023, the British Foreign Affairs Committee urged the UK Government to assess membership of the IPEF, as part of the UK's "Indo-Pacific tilt".

== International reactions ==
Chinese Foreign Minister Wang Yi criticized the initiative as an attempt to further economic decoupling from China. Wang Yi argued that the initiative, and the US Indo-Pacific strategy as a whole, created divisions and "incited confrontation". Wang stated that such an agreement would "ultimately be a failure".

Many analysts have criticized the lack of inclusion of Taiwan in the framework, with Taiwan News calling the lack of inclusion a "snub". An opinion piece published in The Hill asserted that Taiwan was excluded in order to appease key "fence-sitter" countries such as Indonesia whose governments feared angering China.

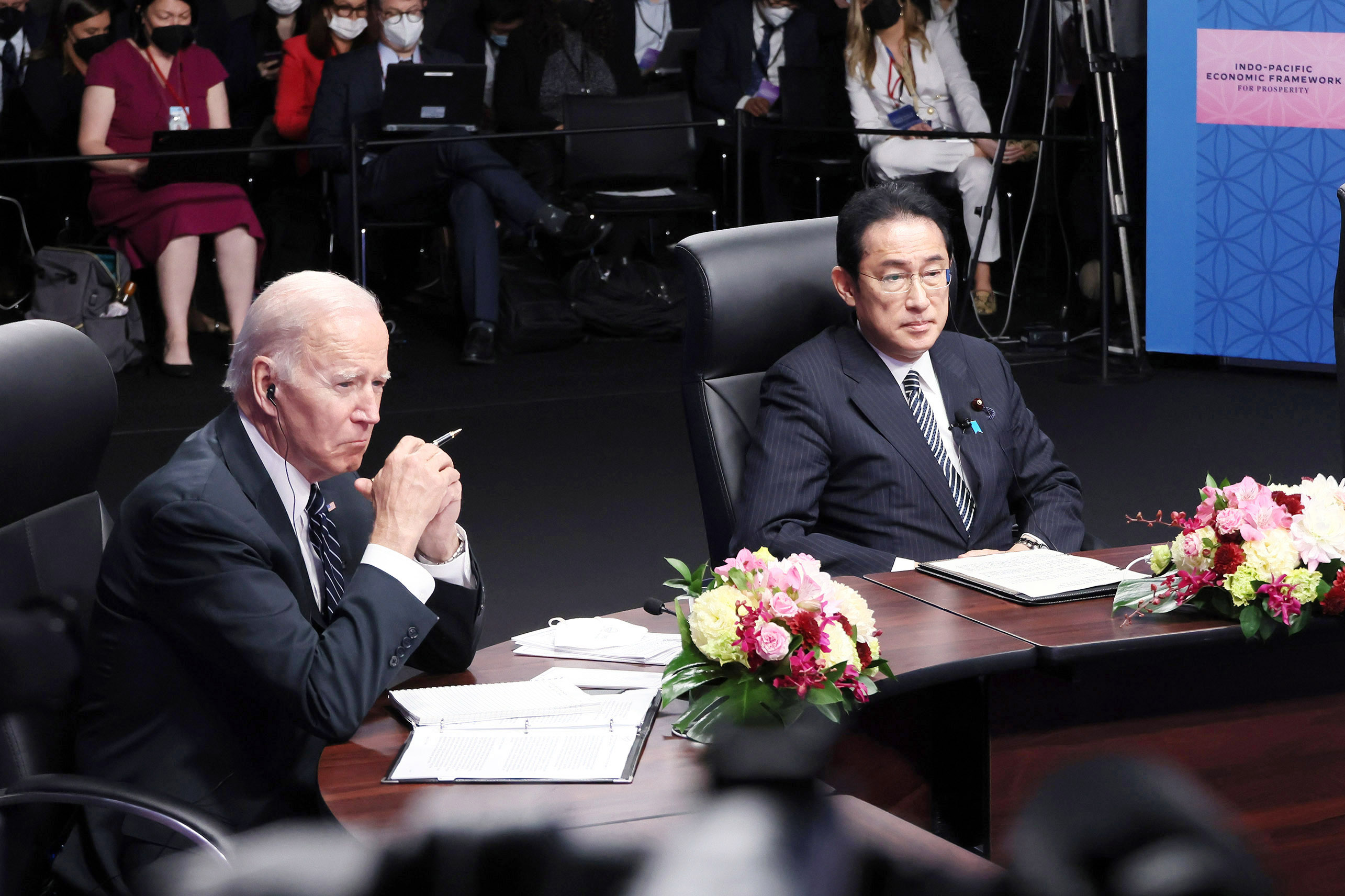
Biden with Japanese prime minister Fumio Kishida

Former Malaysian Prime Minister Mahathir Mohamad criticized the grouping as an initiative intended to isolate China, saying "many countries recognize that this is not an economic grouping but it is truly a political grouping."

=== India ===
Initially, India did not outline a definitive position towards the Indo-Pacific Economic Framework. Prabir De of the Research and Information System for Developing Countries, a think tank associated with the Ministry of External Affairs, wrote that India may be uncomfortable with the high economic standards envisaged by the US. He also noted that the IPEF position on digital governance contained issues that directly conflict with India's stated positions.

In September 2022, Minister of Commerce & Industry Piyush Goyal said at a press conference in the United States that India had agreed to three pillars relating to supply chains: tax, anti-corruption and clean energy, but that the fourth pillar on trade, involving labour, environment, digital data and public procurement, had not been agreed yet. The US expressed concerns about potential Indian demands for data localisation to ensure that data about Indian users is held and processed only in India and not in the US.

A particular aspect of the framework caters also to Indian protectionists. The framework does not allow access to the U.S. market and does not mandate tariff liberalization. Instead, it emphasizes supply chain resilience and provides room to negotiate regulations related to India's highly controversial policies such as data localization.

=== United States ===
In March 2022, a bipartisan coalition of over 200 members of the United States Congress wrote a letter to Secretary of Commerce Gina Raimondo and Trade Representative Katherine Tai urging the inclusion of Taiwan in the IPEF. Following the IPEF's formation, groups including Public Citizen urged trade officials to be transparent during negotiations, including through the publication of draft text proposals.

In a 2022 hearing, two Democratic members of the U.S. Senate expressed concerns that the IPEF was insufficiently ambitious in scope. Senator Bob Menendez (D-NJ), who chaired the Senate Committee on Foreign Relations, stated that he did not believe the framework was “as robust as I think we need" and questioned the absence of Taiwan in the framework. Senator Maria Cantwell (D-WA) expressed concern that IPEF does not include a mechanism to allow U.S. agriculture producers the opportunity to export to new markets.

== Comparison with the RCEP ==
The combined population and gross domestic product of IPEF member states exceeds that of the Regional Comprehensive Economic Partnership (RCEP), a 2020 regional trade deal that includes China. The only RCEP members not also included in the IPEF are China, Myanmar, Cambodia, and Laos; while non-RCEP members are the United States, India, and Fiji.

== See also ==
- Bangladesh and the Indo-Pacific Strategy
- Comprehensive and Progressive Agreement for Trans-Pacific Partnership (CPTPP)
- Trans-Pacific Partnership (TPP)
- China–United States trade war
- Free and Open Indo-Pacific (FOIP)
- Indo-Pacific
- Trade policy of the Joe Biden administration
