= Ashoknagar oilfield =

Oilfield in India

- Location within West Bengal
- Country: India
- Region: West bengal
- Location: Ashoknagar
- Block: Block WB- ONN- 2005/4
- Offshore/onshore: Onshore
- Coordinates: 22.83589°N 88.59694°E
- Operator: Oil and Natural Gas Corporation

Field history
- Discovery: 2018
- Start of development: 2018
- Start of production: 20 December 2020

Production
- Current production of oil: 126 barrels per day (~6,280 t/a)
- Year of current production of oil: 2020-Present
- Estimated oil in place: 240 million barrels (~3.3×10^{7} t)
- Recoverable oil (million tonnes): 0.718

Ashoknagar oilfield (MBA basin: Ashoknagar 1 well) is a petroleum extracting site located at Ashoknagar in the North 24 Parganas district, West Bengal. The oil field is located 48 km from the state capital Kolkata. The oil field was discovered in 2018 by Oil and Natural Gas Corporation. This is the first oil field in West Bengal and East India.

December 20, 2020, Union Petroleum Minister Dharmendra Pradhan inaugurated the oil and natural gas reserves at Ashoknagar.

== History ==
In Ashoknagar gas was first found under 2,300 meters from the surface after came oil. Oil and Natural Gas Corporation and Oil India were awarded the block in Bengal basin under the Mahanadi-Bengal- Andaman division, way back in 2009. The first phase of exploration got over in 2014. The huge reserves of oil and gas were found in the second phase with commercial exploitability confirmed on August 20, 2018.

For 60 years Oil and Natural Gas Corporation has been trying to get oil and gas reserves in West Bengal digging 150 wells in the process. But its first discovery happened in Ashoknagar on 3.5 acres.

The West Bengal government allowed the lease of land to ONGC for production of 50 Acres.

== Location of wells ==
- Baigachi, near Hijlia Bridge
- Daulatpur, near 19 No. Bridge
- Bhurkunda, near Bhurkunda Bazaar

== Capacity and production ==
State-owned explorer Oil and Natural Gas Corporation took advantage of a newly prescribed policy of the centre to position Bengal on the oil and gas map of India following its discovery at the Ashoknagar block, even as the long-term commercial viability of the hydrocarbon asset remains to be ascertained.

According to sources, the capacity of the block could be one hundred thousand cubic metres per day of gas and 15-18 cubic metres of oil pr day . “Two exploratory wells have been dug there,” the sources said. Besides Assam, no eastern or northeastern state has an operating oil field. Neither is there an operating natural gas field in the region.

== Quality of crude oil ==
Around 375 barrels of crude oil, whose quality is said to be even better than India's most prolific oil asset Bombay High, have been extracted from a well on the outskirts Ashoknagar since September 2020, making it the most potent hydrocarbon discovery ever made in the state.

The quality of oil extracted from this basin is far superior to the Brent Crude and is at par with West Texas Intermediate which is considered the world's best known benchmark crude oil. Oil from Ashoknagar has API gravity of 40-41, which is considered to be a light variety and sought after because of the lower load it exerts on refineries. A higher API gravity indicates a lighter and lower density crude. Light crude falls under the 35-45 API gravity range. West Texas Intermediate crude, denoted to oil lifted in the North America, has an API gravity of 39.6 degrees. Brent crude, a benchmark for oil produced in the North Sea, has a density of around 835 kg/m3, being equivalent to a specific gravity of 0.835 or an API gravity of 38.06.

== Future prospects ==
ONGC will explore two more blocks in North 24-Parganas, after successful exploration of commercially viable oil block in Ashoknagar. These new blocks were acquired under OALP while the oil-producing block was acquired under previous NELP VII. North 24-Parganas has a huge potential of both oil and gas and can prove a big boom for the economy of West Bengal, said Union minister for petroleum and natural gas Dharmendra Pradhan on Sunday while dedicating Bengal Basin, the 8th oil-producing basin in India, to the nation.

Oil and Natural Gas Corporation would invest Rs 425 crore in new exploration in the next two years in the basin. It has already invested Rs 3,400 crore for developing the producing block in North 24-Parganas in the last two years. The crude from this block will be refined from Haldia refinery of Indian Oil. Pradhan also made it clear that land acquisition for new exploration would be done with the help of local government and as per its rules and regulations.
