= Bengal Basin =

Bengal Basin

The Bengal Basin is a sedimentary basin. The term Bengal basin is used to describe geological structure of Bengal region's sedimentary basin. It is spread across the nation of Bangladesh and Indian state of West Bengal. The Bengal basin in the eastern part of the Indian subcontinent forms the world's largest fluvio-delta and shallow marine sedimentary basin. This shallow marine sedimentary basin coupled with the Bengal Fan beneath the Bay of Bengal to form the largest sedimentary dispersal system known in the modern world.

The Bengal basin was initiated during the breakup of Gondwanaland in the late Mesozoic Era. The basin consists of a thick Early Cretaceous-Holocene sedimentary succession. Proximal deposition of a portion of orogenic sediments from the Eastern Himalaya and Indo-Burman ranges deposited in the Bengal Basin. The thickest sediments in the basin occur in the coastal area of the Bay of Bengal, where sediments are about 20 km thick.

It is bounded by faults on all its sides except the southern side. The basin is bounded by the West Margin Fault and the Malda–Kishanganj Fault in the west, the Surma Margin Fault in the east and the Yamuna Fault and the Dauki fault in the northeast.

== Origin ==
There are different theories about the origin of the Bengal Basin. However, four theories are the most accepted. The theories are:

- The basin is the result of subduction of the Indian plate beneath the Eurasian and Burmese plates.
- The Bengal basin is essentially a residual ocean basin and developed on the eastern continental margin of India.
- The Bengal basin is a foreland basin with a succession of mainly deltaic sediments derived from the erosion of the Himalayan and Indo-Burmese ranges.
- The Bengal basin developed into isolated graben controlled basins in the basement during the breakup of the Gondwana land.

== Geologic ==
The Bengal Basin has a thin, gently sloping alluvial cover in the western and northern parts, which thickens basin-ward. Considerable variation in stratigraphy, sedimentary tectonics and basin evolution is observed in different parts of the basin. The entire basin is divided into three smaller sub-basins for structural variation: Northern sub-basin, Western sub-basin and South-eastern sub-basin.

=== Sub-basin ===
==== Northern sub-basin ====
The northern sub-basin mainly consists of the northern part of the Bengal basin. It lies between the 'saddle' of the Garo-Rajmahal gap (submerged ridge) in the south and the Himalayan Front, which is part of the Indian states of West Bengal and Bangladesh. The shallowest part of the sub-basin is in the south, where Neogene sediments varies in thickness from 128 m to 1,160 m. The tectonically down-warped frontal belt of the Himalayas contains Neogene sediments. The southern edge of the submerged mountains along the Garo-Rajmahal is a fault zone, known as the east–west oriented Dauki fault.

==== Western sub-basin ====
The westernmost part of the Bengal basin forms the western sub-basin. It is more than 100 km wide in Murshidabad district and relatively less wide in Medinipur area in the south. The stratigraphic succession of the western sub-basin shows virtually complete lithostratigraphic succession from Early Cretaceous to Recent sediments. The western sub-basin portion belonging to West Bengal is characterized by gentle eastward slopes and numerous step faults with small displacements. The sediment thickness increases steadily from about 500 m near the western end to more than 6,500 m near Kolkata.

The presence of larite and laritic soil is seen in this part. The subsurface consists of layers of sandstone, red shale, grit and gravel. The Dhananjaypur Formation at the base of the Rajmahal trap is identified as the early stage of subsidence on the eastern side of the west margin fault. This sub-basin has deposits of rock from the Rajmahal and Jayanthi hills and alluvium from the Bhagirathi River. The sediments from the Rajmahal hills were deposited through the Bolpur and Ghatal Formations. The Bolpur Formation consists of mudstone, sandstone and trapwash and the Ghatal Formation consists of sandstone, limestone and shale. Ranaghat and Malda Formation were formed by Bhagirathi river. Ranaghat Formation consists of sandstone, limestone and shale, and Sand and mudstones are present in the Malda Formation.

==== Southeastern sub-basin ====
The southeastern sub-basin is bounded on the west by the Eocene shelf-break and the easternmost edge of the CTFB. This sub-basin shows a huge sedimentary thickness of 10 km to 18 km. The southeastern sub-basin is filled with massive clastic sediments and the sediment thickness increases from northwest to southeast. The sub-basin is divided into 5 parts according to tectonic domains: Sylhet trough, Tangail-Tripura high (also known as Madhupur high), Faridpur trough, Barisal-Chandpur high and Hatia trough. The Hatia trough is the deepest trough in the Bengal Basin with the thickest clastic sediment deposits.

In various parts of the Sylhet Trough, large amounts of sediment were deposited between the Oligocene and Late Pleistocene, forming Berail sediments layer 10 km to more than 17 km thick. A 1,500 m thick layer of sandstone, siltstone and mudstone is observed in Barisal.

== Mineral resources ==
The Bengal Basin has an abundance of natural gas. Natural gas is produced in Bangladesh. Also, large reserves of crude oil have been discovered in West Bengal. Crude oil is extracted from Ashoknagar oil field in West Bengal.

== See also ==
- Foreland basin
- Bangladesh and the Indo-Pacific Strategy
