= Dauki fault =

Major fault along the southern boundary of the Shillong Plateau

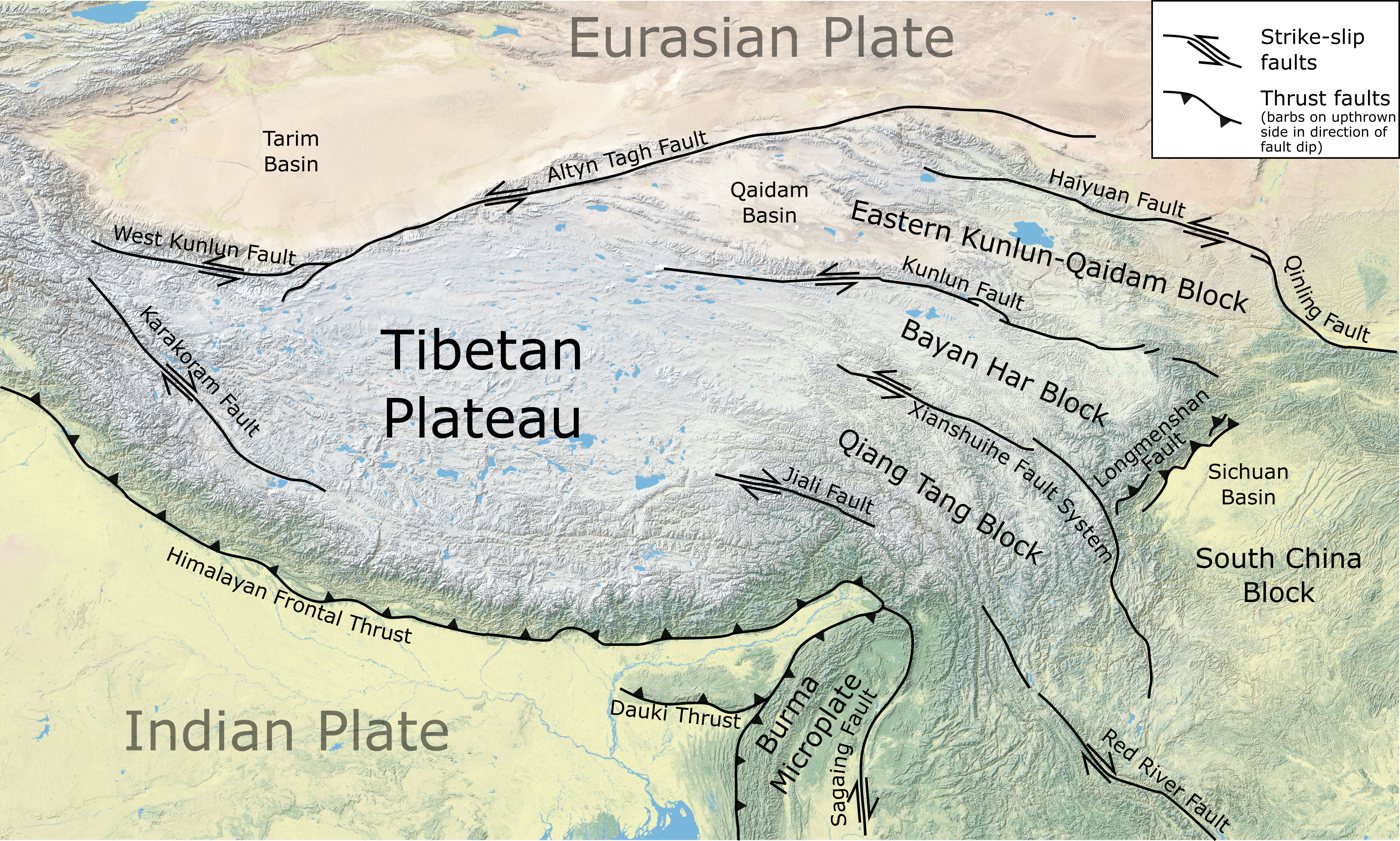
Map of the main fault zones and blocks of the Tibetan Plateau with Dauki thrust

The Dauki fault also known as Sylhet fault is a major fault along the southern boundary of the Shillong Plateau that may be a source of destructive seismic hazards for the adjoining areas, including northeastern Bangladesh. The fault, inferred to go through the southern margin of the Shillong Plateau, is an east–west-trending reverse fault inclined towards the north.

Marking the southern margins of Shillong Plateau (which is much steeper than the northern slope at about a height of 1500 m), the prominent East-West Dauki Fault System (5–6 km wide) is the most remarkable feature of the Plateau. This fault zone forms a sharp escarpment along the southern edge of the plateau. The steep escarpment indicates vertical displacement along the Dauki Fault Zone where the Bangladesh plains subside actively. Though the Dauki Fault Zone is shown as a single fault line on the geological map of Bangladesh (1990) but the images show that it is the combination of a number of en-echelon faults trending in different directions, making the fault scraps zigzag rather than a straight line. Spread between the block faulted Palaeogene sediments of the Northern Foreland Shelf and the block faulted Piedmont deposits of Plio-Pleistocene age of the Garo Hills, the Dauki Fault is a structural unit of considerable regional importance. The northeastern part of the Bengal Basin experiences strong seismicity believed to be caused by the Dauki Fault System.

The Dauki Fault, according to Evans (1964), is a tear fault (transcurrent or strike slip fault) that trends transverse to the strike of the deformed rocks of the Mikir Hills Plateaus. But Murthy et al. (1969) contradicted this proposition of Evans and argued with evidence that Dauki fault has a vertical uplift to the north, causing the Mikir Hills Plateaus as an uplifted region with northward tilting. These faults are similar to upthrusts.

== Seismic activity ==
Judging by the geomorphic features of the Shillong Plateau, the gravity anomaly data, and uplifted Tertiary and Quaternary deposits on the southern foothills of the Shillong Plateau, Dauki Fault was long believed to be active during the Holocene period. It is assumed that the Dauki fault has ruptured three times in the past one thousand years. The Dauki fault might be divided into four rupture segments, the western, central, eastern, and easternmost segments. The eastern and western segments ruptured in AD 840–920 and in 1548, respectively. The 1897 earthquake might have been caused by the rupture of the central segment.

A trench investigation conducted across the Dauki Fault at Gabrakhari Village, on the western part of the Dauki fault, inferred the timing of seismic events dating back to A.D. 1500–1630. The seismic event during A.D. 1500–1630 may correspond with the 1548 Bengal earthquake, the first recorded large earthquake of Bangladesh. Sand dikes, which reach near the ground surface due to paleo-liquefactions, were confirmed at the trench. These sand dikes formed during the Great Assam Earthquake of 12 June 1897 (M_{w} ⩾ 8.0) caused by the rupture of the Dauki fault.

== Geological features ==
Folding in soft sediments along the Dauki fault reveals the compression direction. Directional compressional tectonism has been expressed through lateral movements along the Dauki Fault as well as other faults and folds just south of the Haflong Thrust. It has been observed from the studies that the Dauki fault zone and the areas in Bangladesh show various tectonic features, which are mostly controlled by vertical movements. The occurrence of several deep earthquakes (> 100 km) indicate deep tectonic activities in the upper mantle.

A Hinge Zone of deep-seated normal faults in the basement complex coinciding with the eastern margin of the Calcutta-Mymensingh gravity high passes across the Dauki Fault to the Naga Hills region of Assam. The Hinge Zone is characterized by a series of step faults across its length. This Hinge Zone, characterized by a series of step faults across its length, is seismically active. The hypocentres of earthquake originating with this zone have depth ranges from 71 km to 150 km. The Zone is conventionally thought of as representing the dividing line between the Indian Platform with full thickness of continental crust and the Bengal Foredeep.

In the south, north–south-trending axial surfaces of folds in Surma basin bend towards northeast while approaching the trace of Dauki fault, indicating dextral strike slip movement along the Dauki fault. This inference is further supported by the outcrop pattern of Haflong thrust in the footwall block with the concavity facing west. This thrust belonging to the BoS abruptly terminates against the younger Dauki fault. In the west, the hanging wall block of Dauki fault meets the non-folded, undeformed, near horizontal sedimentaries of Sylhet trough of Neogene. It is proposed that the Sylhet sediments were deposited in a pull-apart basin in the releasing bend of Dauki fault during the dextral strike slip movement. Thus the net slip for Dauki fault involves a vertical component and a dextral strike slip component (oblique-slip fault).
