= 2025 Bangladesh earthquake =

Magnitude 5.5 earthquake in South Asia

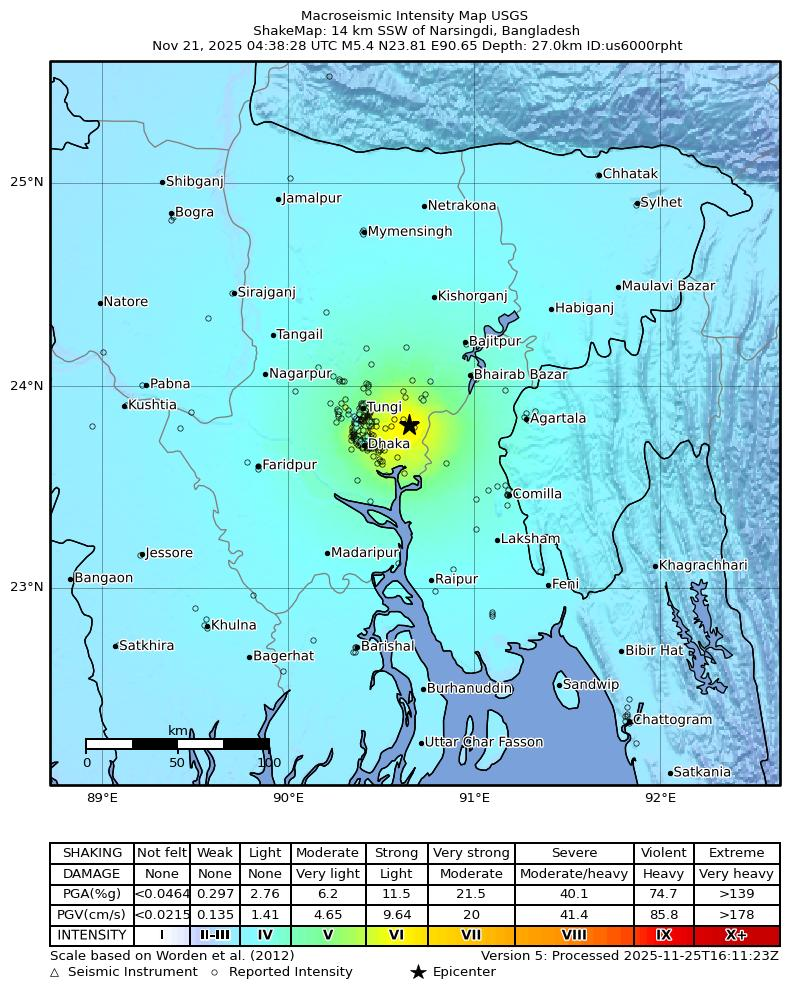
- USGS Shakemap

- Location within Bangladesh
- UTC time: 2025-11-21 04:38:26
- ISC event: 644658714
- USGS-ANSS: ComCat
- Local date: 21 November 2025
- Local time: 10:38:26 BST
- Duration: 26 seconds
- Magnitude: M_{L} 5.7 M_{w} 5.4
- Depth: 27.0 km (17 mi)
- Epicenter: 23.894°N 90.579°E; Danga, Narsingdi District, Bangladesh
- Areas affected: Bangladesh; India
- Max. intensity: MMI VI (Strong)
- Aftershocks: 4
- Casualties: 10 deaths 629+ injuries

On 21 November 2025, at 10:38:26 BST (UTC+6), a moment magnitude 5.4 earthquake struck near Dhaka, Bangladesh, followed by at least four aftershocks. At least 10 people died and nearly 630 others suffered injuries. It was the deadliest earthquake to strike the country in over two decades.

== Tectonic setting ==
Bangladesh lies close to two parts of the zone of collision between the Indian and Eurasian plates. To the north it is bounded by the Shillong Plateau which has a major thrust fault, the Dauki fault running along its southern edge. To the east, the country is affected by the Chittagong Tripura Fold Belt, which continues eastward as the Indo-Burman Ranges. This is a fold and thrust belt, involving sediments of the Bengal Basin, that forms an accretionary complex, caused by the shortening component of the oblique convergence of the Indian plate with the Burma plate (part of the larger Eurasian plate). Away from the plate boundary zones, the Bengal Basin, which has a fill of mainly Neogene sediments up to 20 km thick, is also affected by faults, some of which are thought to be active. Near Dhaka, in the eastern part of the basin, several faults have been identified, including two WNE–ESE trending structures, the Dhaleswari and Padma faults, both interpreted to throw down to the south.

== Earthquake ==
The earthquake struck at 10:38:26 BST (04:38:26 UTC). Its epicentre was near Madhabdi, 14 kilometres (8.7 miles) southwest from Narsingdi, with a depth of 27 kilometres (17 miles). The quake was measured at M_{w} 5.4 by the United States Geological Survey (USGS), and M_{L} 5.7 by the Bangladesh Meteorological Department (BMD). The shaking lasted for 26 seconds, according to the BMD.

At least four aftershocks were detected after the earthquake on 22 November. The first one struck at 10:36:12 BST of M_{L} 3.3, with the epicenter in Palash, Narsingdi; the second one at 6:06:04 BST of M_{L} 3.7, with the epicenter in Badda, Dhaka; the third one at 6:06:05 BST of M_{L} 4.3 with the epicenter in Narsingdi; and the fourth one at 6:14:45 BST of M_{L} 4.1, with the epicenter in Shibpur, Narsingdi.

== Impact ==
=== Bangladesh ===
==== Mainshock ====
Casualties by Bangladeshi districts
District	Deaths	Reported injuries
Narsingdi	5	≥100
Dhaka	4	≥20
Narayanganj	1	≥24
Gazipur	0	400
Comilla	0	85
Total	10	629+

The USGS estimated that more than 10 million people in Dhaka and 300,000 people in Narsingdi felt strong shaking. Many people evacuated buildings during and after the earthquake. Several buildings reportedly sustained cracks, had tilted, or were damaged by fires throughout the country. According to the Dhaka District Administration, at least 300 buildings sustained damage in Dhaka, while the Rajdhani Unnayan Kartripakkha (RAJUK) put the number at over 50, including many buildings that had tilted. In the immediate aftermath of the earthquake, seven power stations were shut down, and electricity generation was disrupted, resulting in rolling blackouts nationwide. Ground ruptures were also observed in Palash and Ghorashal, near the epicentre.

At least 10 deaths were reported, including five in Narsingdi District, four in Dhaka District, and one in Narayanganj District, with 629 others injured across Bangladesh. Three people died, and injuries were reported in the Koshaituli area of Old Dhaka after a brick-made railing collapsed. Another roof collapse left three people injured in Gabtali. At least 22 students of Dhaka University (DU) were also injured, including some who jumped off their residence hall. At least 10 of DU's dormitories sustained cracks. More than 400 people were injured while fleeing out of buildings, a four-storey building collapsed, and a hospital was damaged in Gazipur District. A newborn child was killed and two others were injured after a wall collapsed on them in Narayanganj. Six people were injured by collapsed walls in Araihazar, Narayanganj. Over 100 people were injured in Narsingdi District, directly at the epicenter, and many buildings were damaged. At least 85 workers at the Comilla Export Processing Zone were injured or fainted as a result of panic. Reports of damage at the Chief Adviser's Office also arrived at the fire service, but no significant effects were found after inspection. Major cracks occurred in the front section of the National Institute of Traumatology and Orthopedic Rehabilitation.

In Rajshahi, the second and third floors of the Sher-e-Bangla hall of Rajshahi University tilted due to the shaking. Similarly, in Chittagong, a six-story building leaned against another six-story building after the earthquake.

A test match between Bangladesh and Ireland cricket teams at Sher-e-Bangla National Cricket Stadium was also halted for three minutes due to the earthquake. Spectators panicked and rushed in all directions, while the Irish cricketers moved to the ground for safety.

==== Aftershocks ====
The second and third aftershocks also resulted in mass evacuation in several places. At least six students of DU were injured while rushing out of their residential halls.

Public institutions like the University of Dhaka, Jagannath University, and Dhaka Medical College Hospital suspended academic activities in various terms after the aftershocks. Many non-governmental educational institutions switched to online learning. Some students of DU slept outside the residence of the vice-chancellor, fearing the aftershocks. Petrobangla was instructed by the Ministry of Power, Energy and Mineral Resources to suspend oil and gas exploration drilling in the country for 48 hours starting on 23 November.

Chief adviser Muhammad Yunus held an emergency meeting of earthquake experts, researchers, and university professors on 24 November 2025, which concluded with the decision to establish a task force on earthquake preparedness.

=== India ===
Tremors were felt in Kolkata and eastern states of India. Structures shook, and many people evacuated buildings and fled into streets across West Bengal, including in Kolkata and Bidhannagar. A Modified Mercalli intensity (MMI) of III (weak) was estimated in Basirhat and Balurghat. Tremors were also felt in Berhampore, Krishnanagar, Kalyani, and Howrah.

== Reactions ==
In Bangladesh, the Dhaka District Administration established an emergency control room to conduct support and relief to affected areas. The government also established a control room for help in damage assessments. Financial assistance was offered to the victims by the central government, which offered 25,000 taka for families of the deceased and 15,000 taka for those injured. The Dhaka District Administration offered 15,000 taka to each injured person to help shoulder their treatment.

=== International ===
Embassies of the United States and France, and supranational organizations, including the United Nations, the European Union, and the BIMSTEC, expressed sympathies to victims of the earthquake and their families.

== Analysis ==
According to Bangladeshi earthquake expert Humayun Akhtar, the earthquake was the strongest in the recent history of Bangladesh. According to Rubayet Kabir, a top official at the BMD's Earthquake Observation and Research Centre, the earthquake was strongest in the country in the last 30 years, and released the same amount of energy as the atomic bombs dropped on Hiroshima and Nagasaki.

Many experts warned that the earthquake may be a prelude to a more powerful and deadlier earthquake in the region, as it sits on the collision zone of two tectonic plates. Akhtar calculated that less than 1% of the energy stored in the subduction zone was released from the earthquake and its aftershocks, and there is a high possibility of a major quake of a magnitude of 8.2–9 in the region in the near geological future.

Experts estimated that an earthquake of magnitude 6 to 6.5 on the Madhupur fault can risk nearly 10 million people's lives across the districts of Dhaka, Gazipur, Mymensingh, and Tangail; and the fault is capable of generating earthquakes of magnitude 7 to 7.5 at any time. Following the earthquake, RAJUK said it had identified nearly 300 buildings that were at risk in Dhaka. It is also estimated that an earthquake of a magnitude of 6.9 in the fault may result in 210,000 fatalities, 229,000 injuries, and the collapse of 865,000 buildings in Dhaka.

== Misinformation ==
Prothom Alo Fact-checking found that social media users falsely linked media of the 2015 Nepal and 2025 Myanmar earthquakes, as well as AI-generated content, to the earthquake in Bangladesh. Some of them were also used by Indian and Pakistani media and news portals, including Republic Bangla. Pro-Awami League accounts spread rumours of the tilting of the Chief Adviser's Office. An "earthquake-infodemic" was also created through rumours and "warnings" of an upcoming major earthquake spread through WhatsApp and Facebook.

== See also ==
- 1997 Chittagong earthquake, an earthquake felt on the exact same date 28 years prior
- List of earthquakes in Bangladesh
- List of earthquakes in 2025
