= Fauna of Kaziranga National Park =

National park in Assam, India

Kaziranga National Park (Romanisation: kazironga rastrio uiddan, Assamese pronunciation: [kaziɹɔŋa ɹastɹiɔ uɪddan]) is an Indian national park and a World Heritage Site in Golaghat and Nagaon districts of Assam, India. It is refuge for the world's largest population of great one-horned rhinoceros. Kaziranga has the highest density of tigers among protected areas in the world and was declared a Tiger Reserve in 2006. The park has large breeding populations of elephant, wild Asiatic water buffalo and swamp deer. Kaziranga is recognized as an Important Bird Area by Birdlife International for conservation of avifaunal species. The park has achieved notable progress in wildlife conservation with respect to other protected areas in India.Kaziranga was declared a Tiger Reserve in 2006

Kaziranga is a vast stretch of tall elephant grass, marshland and dense tropical moist broadleaf forests crisscrossed by four main rivers — Brahmaputra, Diphlu, Mora Diphlu and Mora Dhansiri and has numerous small water bodies. Kaziranga has been the theme of several books, documentaries and songs. The park celebrated its centenary in 2005 after its establishment in 1905 as a reserve forest.

Local legend tells about a village girl named Ranga and a young man named Kazi from Karbi Anglong who fell in love. Their parents would not give consent to the affair, so the couple continued to meet each other in the forest. One day, they went into the forest and never returned. Since that day, the people call the forest Kaziranga.

== Biomes ==
Kaziranga is one of the largest tracts of protected land in the sub-Himalayan belt, and due to its high species diversity and presence of high-visibility species, has been described as a "biodiversity hotspot".

The park is located in the Indomalayan realm, and the two ecoregions of the park are Brahmaputra Valley semi-evergreen forests of the Tropical and subtropical moist broadleaf forests biome, and the frequently-flooded Terai-Duar savanna and grasslands of the Tropical and subtropical grasslands, savannas, and shrublands biome.

== Fauna ==
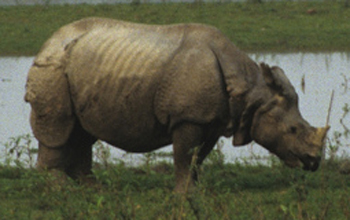
A rhinoceros grazing at Kaziranga National Park

The park contains significant breeding populations of 35 mammalian species, out of which 15 are threatened mammals according to the IUCN Red List. 479 species of birds (both migratory and resident) have been spotted at the park, including 25 globally threatened and 21 near threatened species. The park has also been identified as an Important Bird Area (IBA) by Birdlife International for the conservation of the avifaunal species. A total of 42 species of reptile have been reported from the park. These include the endangered gharial and the rare Assam roofed turtle.

=== Mammals ===
In 2006 Kaziranga had 1,855 Indian rhinoceros, about 70% of the world's total wild population, The critically endangered Indian Javan rhinoceros was probably also an inhabitant of Kaziranga. Assam was part of the historical range of the critically endangered pygmy hog. Even though wild boar are present in Kaziranga, the pygmy hog is no longer found here. Kaziranga contained as many as 1,206 Indian elephants in 2005, a 25% increase from 1,048 in 2002. The combined Kaziranga–Karbi Anglong Elephant Reserve has as many as 1,940 elephants.

The 2001 park census counted 1666 wild Asian water buffalo, up 146% from 677 in 1984.

The eastern swamp deer had 468 individuals in 2002, down 38% from 756 in 1984. This may be a reflection of the increasing tiger population. Other significant populations of large herbivores include 30 gaur in 1984, and 58 sambar in 1999. Smaller herbivores include 100 Indian muntjac in 1972, 431 wild boar in 1999, 5,045 hog deer in 1999 and barking deer.

Kaziranga has the rare distinction of being one of the very few places in the world which contain breeding populations of three big cats outside Africa — the royal Bengal tiger, the Indian leopard and the clouded leopard. Kaziranga had a population of around 30 Bengal tigers during the 1972 census, which grew 187% to 86 in the 2000 census, distinguishing Kaziranga with one tiger for each five km^{2} of park area, the highest tiger density in the world. Kaziranga formally became a tiger reserve in 2006. According to Dr. Melvin Sunquist of University of Florida, who himself conducted a field study and measurement of Bengal tigers in Chitwan National Park, Nepal in the 1970s, a recent camera trap survey inside Kaziranga National Park has revealed some very large looking tigers, in fact, the largest Bengal tigers he's ever come across. Due to Kaziranga's higher prey density compared to other parks of India, the tigers in here may grow to a larger size as a result.

The park is also home to sloth bears and the lesser felids: jungle cat, fishing cat and leopard cat. Other small mammals include the rare hispid hare, Indian gray mongoose, small Indian mongoose, large Indian civet, small Indian civet, Bengal fox, golden jackal, Chinese pangolin, Indian pangolin, hog badger, Chinese ferret badger, particolored flying squirrel and bats.

The park has a large variety of primates including all free roaming primates in India with the exception of the endemic Western Ghats primates and the newly discovered Arunachal macaque. This includes the vulnerable and rare species of Bengal slow loris, Assamese macaque, capped langur, golden langur and the only ape found in India — the hoolock gibbon. Kaziranga's rivers are home to the highly endangered Ganges dolphin.

=== Birds ===
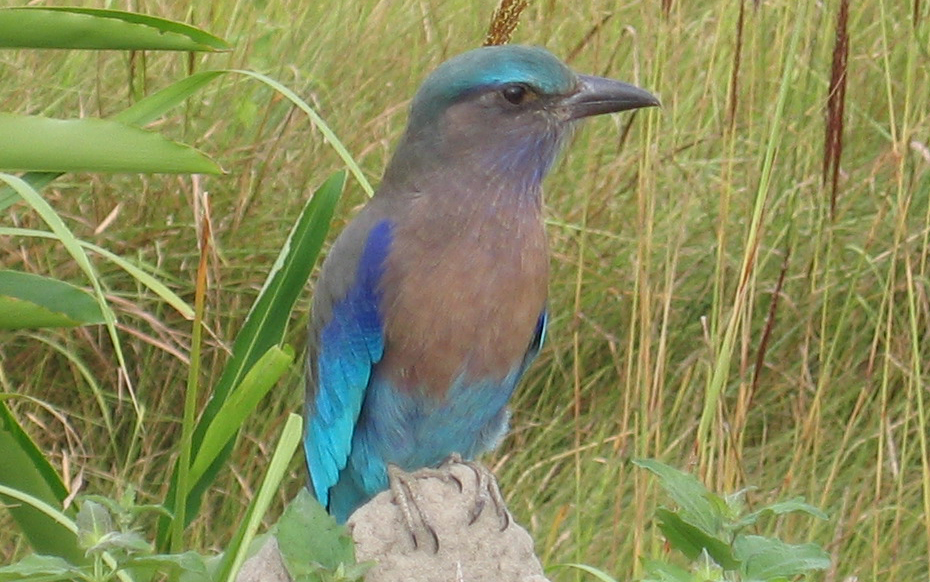
An Indian roller at Kaziranga

Almost 478 species of birds (both migratory and resident) have been spotted at the park, including 25 globally threatened and 21 near threatened species. The park has also been identified as an Important Bird Area (IBA) by Birdlife International for the conservation of the avifaunal species.

Waterfowl that breed in or pass through Kaziranga include several rare species of geese (lesser white-fronted goose), and ducks (ferruginous pochard, Baer's pochard). Other rare riverine birds include kingfishers (Blyth's kingfisher), herons (white-bellied heron), pelicans (Dalmatian pelican, spot-billed pelican), shanks (spotted greenshank) and terns (black-bellied tern). Rare migratory storks and cranes are also seen wintering in the park (lesser adjutant, greater adjutant, black-necked stork, Asian openbill).

Kaziranga hosts a large number of raptors, considered a sign of a healthy ecosystem. This includes the rare eastern imperial eagle, greater spotted eagle, white-tailed fishing eagle, Pallas's fish eagle, grey-headed fish eagle and the lesser kestrel. Kaziranga was once home to seven species of vultures. About 99% of the stable vulture population was killed by kidney failure caused by consuming the veterinary drug diclofenac in domestic animal carcasses. Of these, the red-headed vulture, and Eurasian black vulture are still near threatened due to their large range, but the Indian vulture, slender-billed vulture and the Indian white-rumped vulture have suffered cataclysmic loss of numbers and are virtually extinct in the wild, including Kaziranga. The Indian populations of the other two vultures have similar losses — the griffon vulture and the Himalayan griffon, but they are still well represented outside India. The loss of this many vultures creates a critical void in the scavengers ecological niche in Kaziranga.

Rare game birds (which were once hunted) include partridges (swamp francolin), bustards (Bengal florican) and pigeons (pale-capped pigeon). Several other important families of birds inhabit Kaziranga, including rare species of hornbills (great Indian hornbill and the lesser risk wreathed hornbill), Old World babblers (Jerdon's babbler, marsh babbler) and weaver birds (the common baya weaver and the threatened Finn's weaver), thrushes (Hodgson's bushchat), Old World warblers (bristled grassbird). Other threatened species include the black-breasted parrotbill and rufous-vented prinia.

List of birds: Complete list

=== Reptiles, amphibians, and fish ===
Two of the largest snakes in the world (the reticulated python and the rock python) as well as the longest venomous snake in the world (the king cobra) are common inside the park. The park also contains Bengal monitor and water monitor populations. The park is home to the rare monocled cobra, as well as three of the Big Four — Indian cobra, Russell's viper and common krait.

In all, Kaziranga is home to 15 species of turtles, including the endemic Assam roofed turtle, and to one species of tortoise — the brown tortoise. The regional Assam garden lizard is present. 42 species of fish are found in the Kaziranga area, including the unusual ocellated pufferfish.
