= Baburhat =

Wholesale textile market in Narsingdi, Bangladesh

Baburhat বাবুরহাট Shekherchar Baburhat
- Wholesale textile market
- Country: Bangladesh
- Division: Dhaka Division
- District: Narsingdi District
- Upazila: Narsingdi Sadar Upazila
- Union: Shekherchar
- Time zone: UTC+6 (BST)

Baburhat (বাবুরহাট), officially known as Shekherchar Baburhat, is an inter-district wholesale textile market at Shekherchar in Narsingdi Sadar Upazila, Narsingdi District, Bangladesh. It is a major distribution centre for locally manufactured fabrics, handloom products, saris, lungis, dress materials and home textiles.

The market is situated beside the Dhaka–Sylhet Highway, approximately 35 km (22 mi) from Dhaka, near the old channel of the Brahmaputra River.

== History ==
According to Banglapedia, Baburhat developed during the 1930s. A local account recorded by the encyclopaedia states that a landholder known as Ashu Babu initially established a market at Madhabdi. Following a dispute within the family, Kali Babu, Pramatha Babu and Gopal Babu established a competing market at Shekherchar, which subsequently became known as Baburhat.

The surrounding region had long been associated with handloom weaving, and weavers brought their weekly production to the market for wholesale trading. The marketplace was initially reached mainly by river. Road transport developed during the Second World War, when a company identified by Banglapedia as Momin Company constructed a road and introduced a bus service.

== Trade and products ==
Baburhat operates principally as a wholesale market connecting textile manufacturers and weavers with merchants from different parts of Bangladesh. Products sold at the market include saris, lungis, salwar-kameez materials, Punjabi fabrics, towels, unstitched fabrics and household textiles.

Manufacturers based in Narsingdi maintain sales outlets in the market, while textile products produced in other weaving centres, including parts of Pabna, Sirajganj and Rajshahi, are also traded there. Baburhat wholesalers supply fabrics to retailers and markets elsewhere in Bangladesh, including fashion businesses in Dhaka and textile traders in Islampur.

The market has traditionally operated most intensively on weekly market days. A 2011 report in The Daily Star described wholesalers from across Bangladesh arriving on Friday, Saturday and Sunday, although operating days and trading patterns have changed over time.

== Economic significance ==
Baburhat forms part of the wider textile-manufacturing and trading cluster of Narsingdi. In 2023, The Daily Star reported that the Shekherchar and Baburhat markets together contained approximately 5,000 clothing traders, according to the general secretary of the local traders' association. The association also claimed that clothing worth between ৳450 crore (US$37 million) and ৳500 crore (US$41 million) was traded in the two markets each week.

The market is an important distribution point for the domestic lungi industry. The Business Standard reported that lungis valued at more than ৳500 crore (US$41 million) were sold through Baburhat during the first six months of 2021, citing the Narsingdi Chamber of Commerce and Industries.

Trade at Baburhat generally increases before Eid al-Fitr, when retailers purchase saris, lungis and other garments in bulk. Sales are nevertheless affected by wider economic conditions. In 2023, merchants reported substantially lower customer attendance and sales amid inflation and increases in yarn and fabric prices.

== Fires ==
On 29 October 2023, a fire broke out at Baburhat and destroyed at least 75 shops. Seventeen firefighting units were deployed, and no casualties were reported. Market representatives initially estimated losses exceeding ৳20 crore (US$1.6 million), although the final financial loss was not independently established.

Another fire occurred at the Shekherchar–Baburhat market on 17 March 2024. According to the Bangladesh Sangbad Sangstha, approximately 30 shops, many of which sold quilt and curtain fabrics, were destroyed. Nine firefighting units brought the fire under control, and affected merchants initially estimated losses of around ৳10 crore (US$810,000).

== See also ==
- Textile industry in Bangladesh
- Narsingdi District
- Madhabdi
