= Haflong Thrust =

The Haflong Thrust is the most persistent of the thrusts in the 400 km long Belt of Schuppen (BoS) in the western part of Nagaland. The Belt of Schuppen forms the outermost fringe of the mobile belt of the Assam–Arakan basin and forms the most prominent morphotectonic unit of the Naga Hills, where these overthrusts form a complex pattern (in places, higher ones override the lower ones). The frontal thrust, conventionally known as the Naga thrust, is seen to be composed of four different thrusts. The uppermost thrust is known as the Haflong (Disang) thrust. The Naga-Disang (Haflong) Overthrust area includes besides the Naga Hills proper, a few long ranges of hills fringing the plain of Upper Assam, and a large part of the North Cachar Hills (the Belt of Schuppen). The Disang thrust continues in a south-westerly direction from the Naga Hills to Haflong, where it narrows to a complicated but narrow fracture band. This is the Haflong Fault. Along with two major thrusts, the Haflong-Naga Thrust and Disang Thrust, studies revealed three minor thrusts (ST-1, ST-2, ST-3) in the BoS.

The westward continuation of this fracture belt ultimately passes into the Dauki fault. About 60-km west of Haflong the Dauki fault appears to be a nearly vertical break and the beds on the two sides show no great difference in age. Further west downthrown is southerly and still further west in Garo Hills the fault heads to the north along which the Shillong plateau has been shifted southwards. In the southwest at the southern fringe of the Shillong plateau Haflong-Naga Thrust and Disang Thrust merge to form a major East-West fault known as the Dauki-Haflong Thrust.

In Haflong thrusting area, there is much variation in the structure of the south dipping monocline. In the east, between Haflong and Dauki, the beds north of the fault are mostly horizontal or dip gently down to the south, while those of the south of the fault dip more steeply and in places are nearly vertical. There is extensive shattering in a belt several kilometres wide along the fault. West of Haflong, where the fault has little stratigraphical throw, the geosynclinal facies of the Eocene approaches within 7 km of the Kopili beds which are part of the calcareous shelf facies of the Eocene, and which immediately overlie the Sylhet Limestone. In the North Cachar Hills it overrides all the lower thrusts to rest directly on the Foreland Spur. The exposed parts of the thrust sheets nearest the plains are composed principally of rocks of Tipam Series. The exposed parts of the higher thrust sheets are usually made up of chiefly rocks of the Barail Series.
