= Southern Asia =

Southern Asia may refer to the following regions of the Asian continent:

- Indian subcontinent, a physiographical region south of the Himalayas and bounded by the Indo-Burman Ranges to the east and the Hindu Kush to the west
- South Asia, a geopolitical region combining the Indian subcontinent with Afghanistan (SAARC)
- Southern Asia (United Nations geoscheme), a geographical subregion combining the Indian subcontinent with Afghanistan and Iran based on a common linguistic relationship
