= List of earthquakes in Bangladesh =

Map of earthquakes in Bangladesh 1900– (map data)

Earthquakes in Bangladesh are frequent and often cause damage. These seismic events occur due to the country's proximity to a convergent boundary between the Indian Plate, the Eurasian Plate and the minor Burma Plate. Note: Epicenter coordinates of the earthquakes are not always the place where the real epicenter happened.

== Earthquakes ==
Date	Region	Mag.	MMI	Deaths	Injuries	Comments	Tectonic source/ Fault & Location of Epicenter	Ref
2026-06-22	Narayanganj	4.0-4.4 M_{w}	I-V		1	a collapsed roof at a university in Dhaka	Indian Plate (23.7810°N 90.5410°)	
2026-02-27	Assasuni, Satkhira	5.3 M_{w}	VI		3	Buildings damaged from Satkhira to West Bengal	Indian Plate & Eurasian Plate (22.524°N 89.185°E)	
2025-11-21	Madhabdi, Narsingdi	5.4 M_{w}	VI	10	629	Moderate damage, Dhaka felt V, Gazipur and Narayanganj and Narsingdi felt VI, rest of them felt IV or less than IV	Madhupur Fault (23.89°N 90.57°E)	
2023-08-24	Sylhet	5.5 M_{w}	V		10		Dauki Fault System (25.02°N 92.13°E)	
2021-11-26	Chittagong	6.2 M_{w}	VIII	3	5	Slight damage	Indo-Burma Subduction Zone (22.81°N 93.52°E)	
2016-01-04	Manipur (India)	6.7 M_{w}	VII	5	100+	One old man died in Sunamganj District due to heart failure, at Dhaka University, at least 29 people, mostly students, were injured while rushing down stairs or jumping from residential halls, most injuries were caused from panicking.	Irang River Fault (24.80°N 93.50°E)	
2015-04-25	Gorkha (Nepal)	7.8	VI	4 - 6	100+	Moderate damage. At least 17 to 23 buildings across the country, In Dhaka City several high-rises had tilted including buildings in Bangshal (Old Dhaka), In Savar a 6 story building tilted significantly, cracks were reported in schools or hospitals in districts like Bogra and Jessore.	Main Himalayan Thrust (MHT) (28.23°N 84.73°E)	
26-12-2004	North Sumatra (Indonesia)	9.1 - 9.3 M_{w}	IV - V	2	Unknown	Cox's Bazar and Chittagong experienced waves as high as 2.4 meters (8 feet) while Saint Martin's Island had the lowest waves at 31 cm (12.2 inches)	Sunda Megathrust Fault (3.31°N 95.85°E)	[32]
2003-07-27	Chittagong	5.5 M_{b}	VI			Additional damage	Karnaphuli / Barkal Fault (22.82°N 92.34°E)	
2003-07-27	Chittagong	4.3 M_{b}	IV			Additional damage	Karnaphuli / Barkal Fault (22.75°N 92.20°E)	
2003-07-26	Chittagong	5.7 M_{w}	VII	2	25	Moderate damage	Karnaphuli / Barkal Fault (22.89°N 92.33°E)	
2002-06-20	Rangpur	4.5 M_{w}	V		55	Minor damage	Rangpur Saddle (25.84°N 88.93°E)	
2001-12-19	Dhaka	4.5 M_{w}	VI		100	Minor damage	Madhupur Fault (23.63°N 90.37°E)	
1999-07-22	Maheshkhali Island	5.2 M_{w}	VI	6	100	Moderate damage	Maheshkhali Anticline (21.51°N 91.95°E)	
1997-11-21	Mizoram(India)	6.1 M_{w}	V	23	100	Minor damage, a 5-story building collapsed when the earthquake hit, killing 23 people.	Indo-Burma Plate Boundary (22.21°N 92.71°E)	
1989-06-12	Khulna	5.8 M_{w}	VIII	1	100	Minor damage	Eocene Hinge Zone (22.68°N 89.44°E)	
1988-08-06	India-Myanmar	7.3 M_{w}	VII - VIII	2	100	The earthquake resulted in significant damage in infrastructure, a ferry boat had been capsized by a seiche leading to 2 deaths and 30 people missing, in Chittagong about 50 people were injured and in Dhaka and Sylhet an additional 50 people were injured, the shaking was felt as far as the Soviet Union.	Indian Plate & Burma Plate (25.14°N 95.12°E)	
1988-02-06	Sylhet	5.9 M_{w}	VII	2	100	Moderate damage	Dauki Fault (24.78°N 91.56°E)	
1956-06-12	Netrokona	5.5 M_{w}	VII			Some damage.	Dauki Fault (25.03°N 90.85°E)	
1955-12-14	Southeast of Bandarban	6.2 M_{w}	VII - VIII	8	149	Epicentered in Mindat Region, Myanmar. 459 homes destroyed and 8,352 homes damaged.	Chittagong-Arakan Fault (21.8°N 92.5°E)	
1923-09-09	Netrokona	6.9 M_{w}	VIII	10+	100+	Strong damage	Dauki Fault (Eastern Segment) (24.96°N 90.75°E)	
1921-03-30	Near Lalmohan Upazila,Bhola	6.4 M_{w}	VI - VII	Unknown	Unknown	While the exact intensity is unknown, a 6.4 magnitude typically produces "Strong" to "Very Strong" shaking near the epicenter.	Chittagong-Myanmar Fault (22.50°N 90.70°E)	
1918-07-08	Netrokona	7.2 - 7.6 M_{w}	VIII	Unknown	Unknown	The quake was felt as west as Lahore (Pakistan), extensively through East Bengal and Burma (Myanmar), damage were reported in Sylhet, Kishorganj, Brahmanbaria and as far as Dhaka.	Mat Fault (24.50°N 91.00°E)	
1897-06-12	Assam (India)	8.0 - 8.3 M_{w}	IX - X	1,500 - 1,600	Unknown	About 500+ were reported dead in the District of Sylhet, the dome of the Ahsan Manzil had collapsed in the earthquake, forcing the Nawab family to live in tents.	Dauki Fault (26.0°N 90.7°E)	
1885-07-14	Manikganj	7.0 - 7.2 M_{w}	IX	47-100+	Unknown	Strong damage	Madhupur Fault (23.95°N 89.96°E)	
1762-04-02	Chittagong	8.7 - 8.8 M_{w}	XI	200+	Unknown	Extreme damage, local tsunami, the Cess Lung Joom hill was reported to have entirely sunk. Another hill, Joom Chater Pedia, sank so low that its peak became level with the surrounding plains.	Arakan Megathrust (Subduction Zone) (22.0°N 92.0°E)	
1548-09-22	Sylhet	8.0 > M_{w} ⩾ 7.1	VIII-IX	Unknown	Unknown	Extreme damage, water & mud ejected from ground (liquefaction); felt over large area.	Dauki Fault (Unknown)	
Note: The inclusion criteria for adding events are based on WikiProject Earthquakes' notability guideline that was developed for stand alone articles. The principles described also apply to lists. In summary, only damaging, injurious, or deadly events should be recorded.
