= Umananda Temple =

Shiva temple in Assam, India

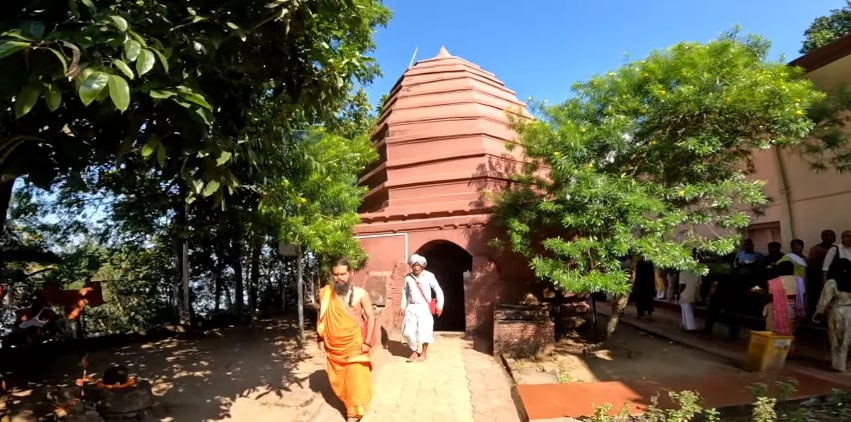
- Chandrasekhar Temple at Umananda temple complex

Religion
- Affiliation: Hinduism
- Deity: Shiva
- Festival: Mahashivaratri

Location
- Location: Guwahati
- State: Assam
- Interactive map of Umananda Temple
- Coordinates: 26°11′47″N 91°44′43″E

Architecture
- Creator: Constructed by Garhgayan Sandikai Borphukan on the orders of Gadadhar Singha
- Completed: 1694; 332 years ago

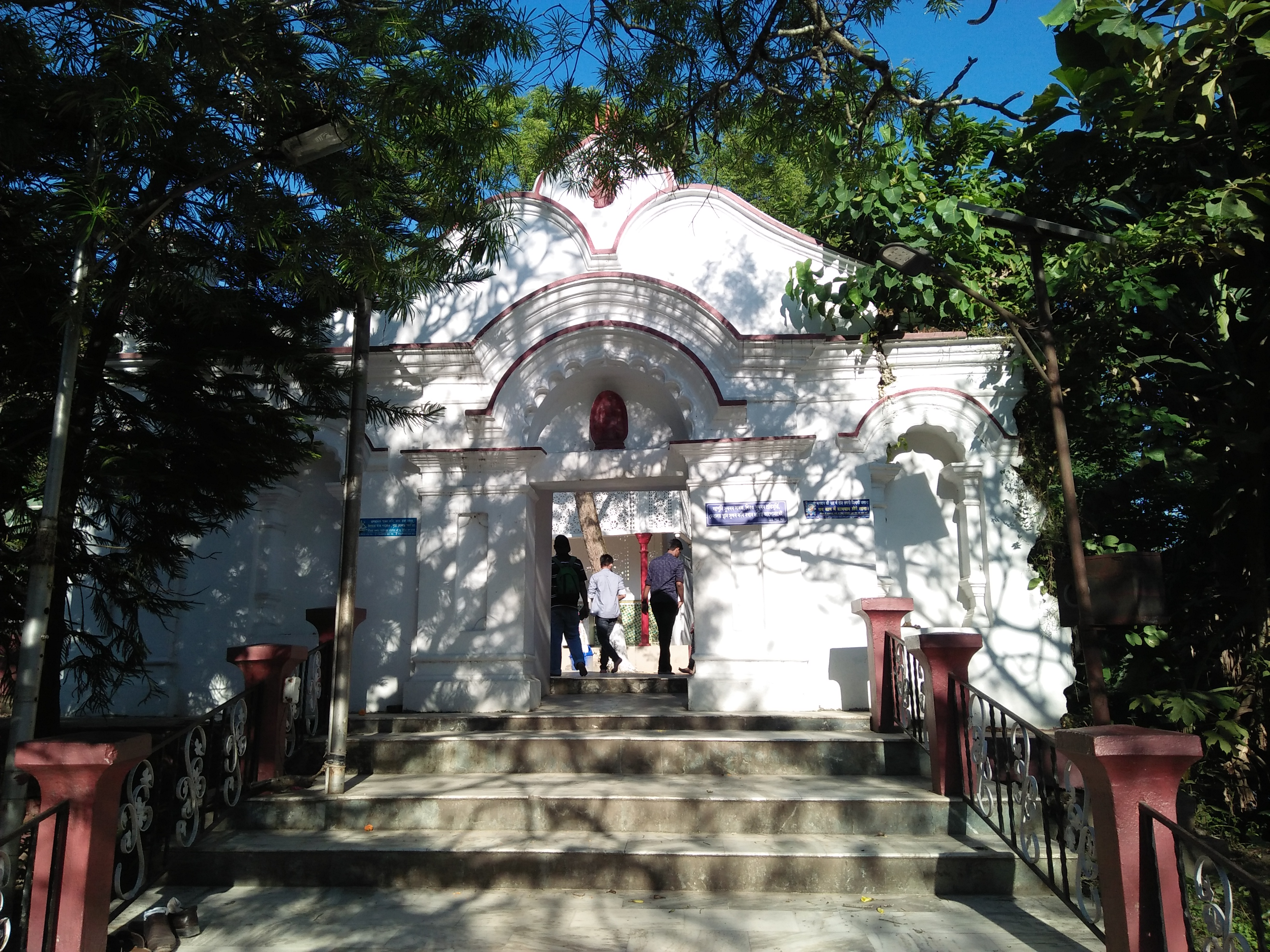
Entrance of Umananda Temple

Umananda Devaloi (Pron: ˈʊməˌnændə ˈdeɪvəˌlɔɪ) is a Shiva temple located on the Umananda Island (Peacock Island) in the middle of the river Brahmaputra, Assam.

Brahmaputra just opposite the office of the Deputy Commissioner of Kamrup or the Kachari Ghat in Guwahati.

It is known as the smallest inhabited riverine island in the world. Country boats that are available on the bank of Brahmaputra take the visitors to the island. The mountain on which the temple has been built is known as Bhasmacala. It was built in 1694CE in the order of Ahom King Gadadhar Singha but was broken down by the 1897 Assam earthquake.

== Legend ==
Siva is said to have resided here in the form of Bhayananda. According to the Kalika Purana, in the beginning of the creation Siva sprinkled ashes (bhasma) at this place and imparted knowledge to Parvati (his consort). It is said that, when Siva was in meditation on this hillock, Kamadeva interrupted his yoga and was therefore burnt to ashes by the fire of Siva’s anger and hence the hillock got the name Bhasmacala.

This mountain is also called Bhasmakuta. The Kalika Purana states that Urvasikunda is situated here and here resides the goddess Urvasi who brings Amrit (nectar) for the enjoyment of Kamakhya and hence the island got the name Urvasi Island.

== Presiding Deity ==
The presiding deity of the temple is Umananda (Tatrasti bhagavan sambhu- ruma- nandakarah Prabhu). The name 'Umananda' comes from the two Hindi words, namely 'Uma', which was another name for Lord Shiva’s wife and 'Ananda' which means happiness. In fact, Peacock Island is one of the smallest inhabited island.

== History ==
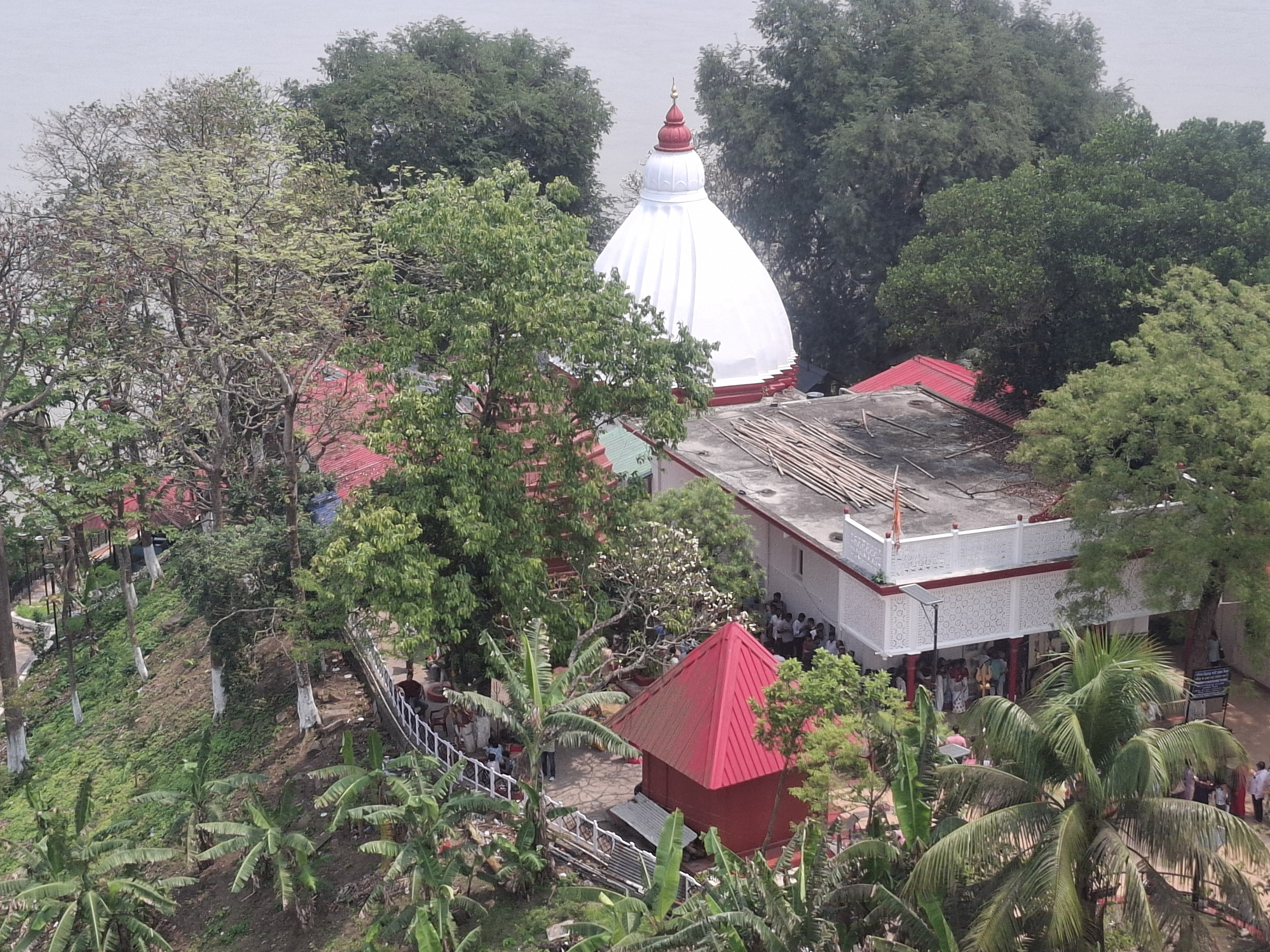
Bird eye view of Umananda Temple

Evidence of a stone temple belonging to the post-Gupta period can be seen on the site. The site has stone sculptures and carvings belonging to the early medieval period. Achaturbhuja stone female figure still exists here besides rock-cut figures of Ganesha and a cave.

Brick temple of Umananda was built in 1694 CE by the Bar Phukan Garhganya Handique by the order of King Gadadhar Singha (1681–1696), one of the eldest and strongest rulers of the Ahom dynasty. The temple was desecrated by the Mughal Army. Aurangzeb later conferred jagir to the temple when Gauhati came under his control.

The original temple was however immensely damaged by a devastating earthquake of 1897. Later, it was reconstructed by a rich local merchant who chose to inscribe the interior part of a Siva temple with Vaishnavite slogans.

== Structure ==
The main shrine is reached by a flight of steep steps. Aside from Lord Shiva, there are 10 other Hindu Gods whose idols reside in the shrines. Representations of Surya, Ganesha, Shiva and Devi (with a scorpion as emblem) in addition to those of Visnu and his ten incarnations (avatar) are found here. The sculptures here show that the worshippers there followed all the principal Hindu gods. The temple has inherited some rock-cut figures.

== Gallery ==
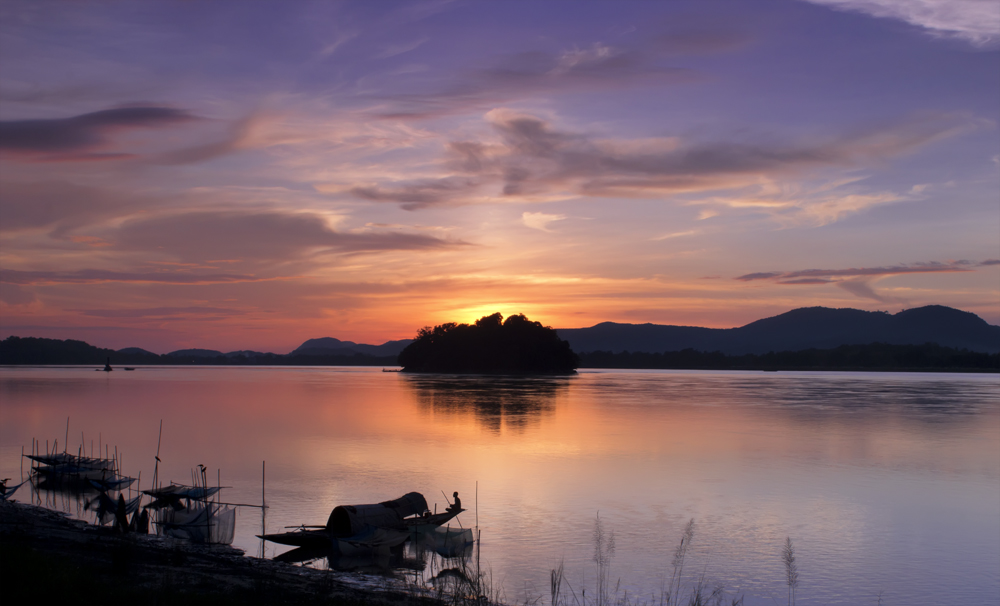

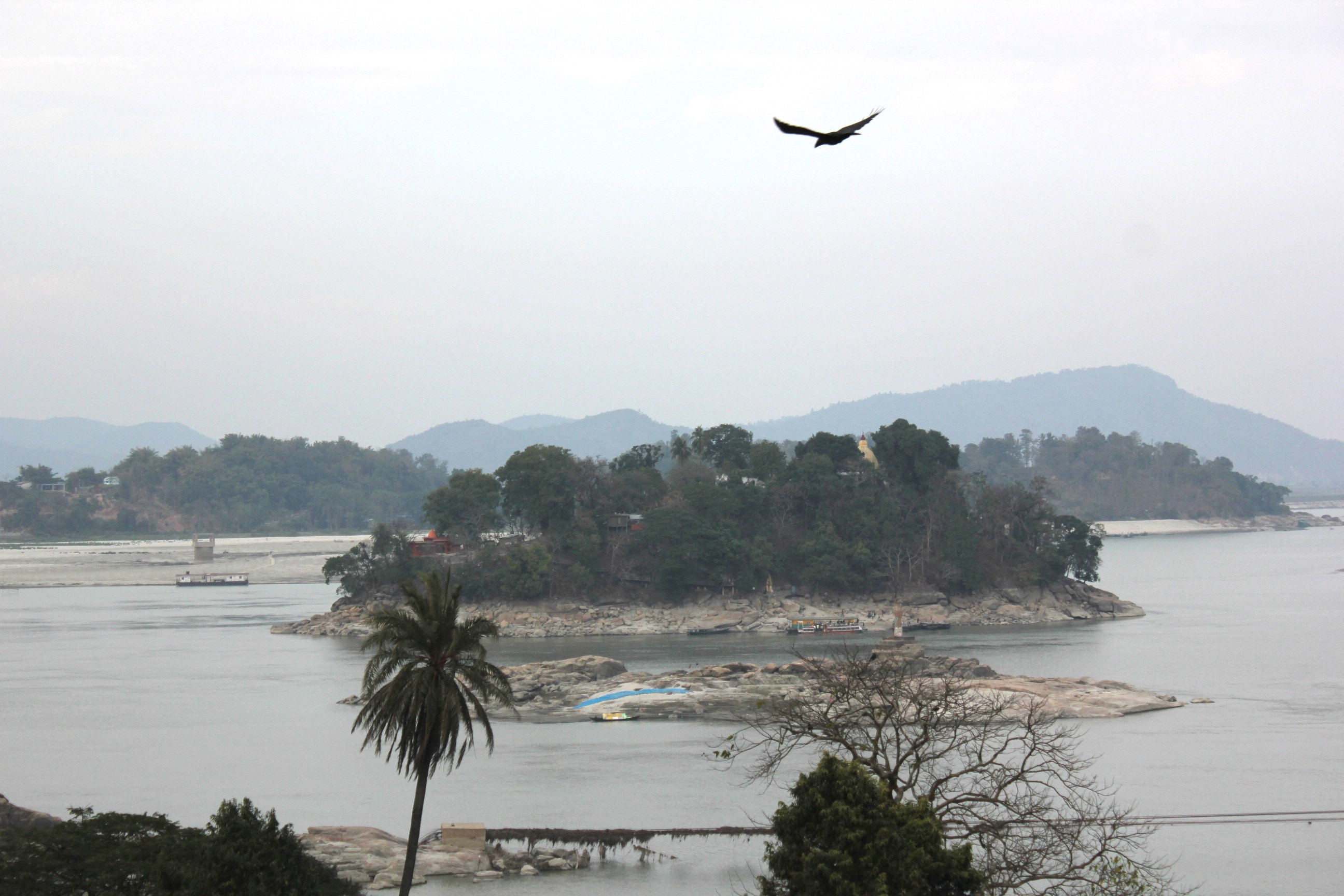

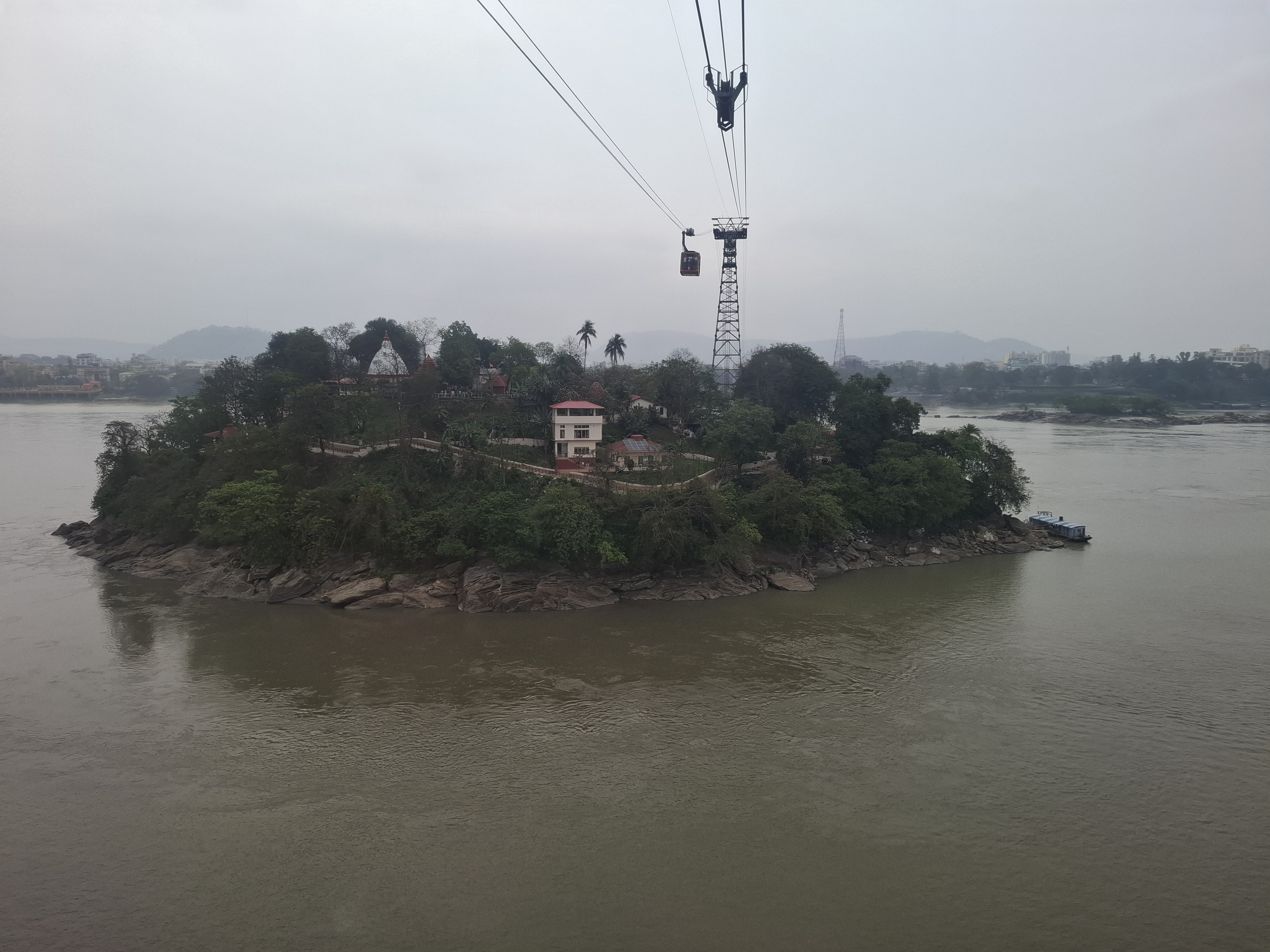

== See also ==
- Hindu pilgrimage sites
- National Geological Monuments of India
- List of Hindu temples
- Tourism in India
- Yatra
