= Purvanchal Range =

Mountain range in northeast India

The Purvanchal Range, or the Eastern Highlands, refers to the northern portion of the Indo-Burman Ranges. It extends through the northeast Indian states of Arunachal Pradesh, Nagaland, Manipur, Tripura and Mizoram and eastern region of Nepal .

== Geography ==
The Purvanchal Range or Eastern Mountains covers an area of about 94,800 km^{2} (36,600 sq mi) with a population of over four million incorporates Nagaland, Manipur, Tripura and Mizoram Hills, Cachar district and a fifth of Haflong tahsil in Assam state, and Tirap district as well as part of Lohit district in Arunachal Pradesh.

The range is the northern portion of the Indo-Burman Range, in north eastern India. It bends sharply to the south beyond the Dihang River gorge, and spreads along the eastern boundary of India with Myanmar. The Purvanchal includes the hill of the Patkai hills, Naga Hills, Mizo Hills and Manipur hills.

== Geology ==
The Purvanchal Mountains are composed largely of strong sandstone geological formations

== See also ==
- Geology of India
- Geography of India
- List of mountains in India
- Mountain ranges of India
- Mountain ranges of the Himalayas
