= Catocala rhodosoma =

Scientific classification
- Kingdom: Animalia
- Phylum: Arthropoda
- Class: Insecta
- Order: Lepidoptera
- Superfamily: Noctuoidea
- Family: Erebidae
- Genus: Catocala
- Species: C. rhodosoma

Binomial name
- Catocala rhodosoma Röber, 1927

Species of moth

Catocala rhodosoma is a moth in the family Erebidae first described by Röber in 1927. It is found in the Naga Hills of India.
