= Umananda Island =

River island in India

Coordinates: 26°11′47″N 91°44′42″E

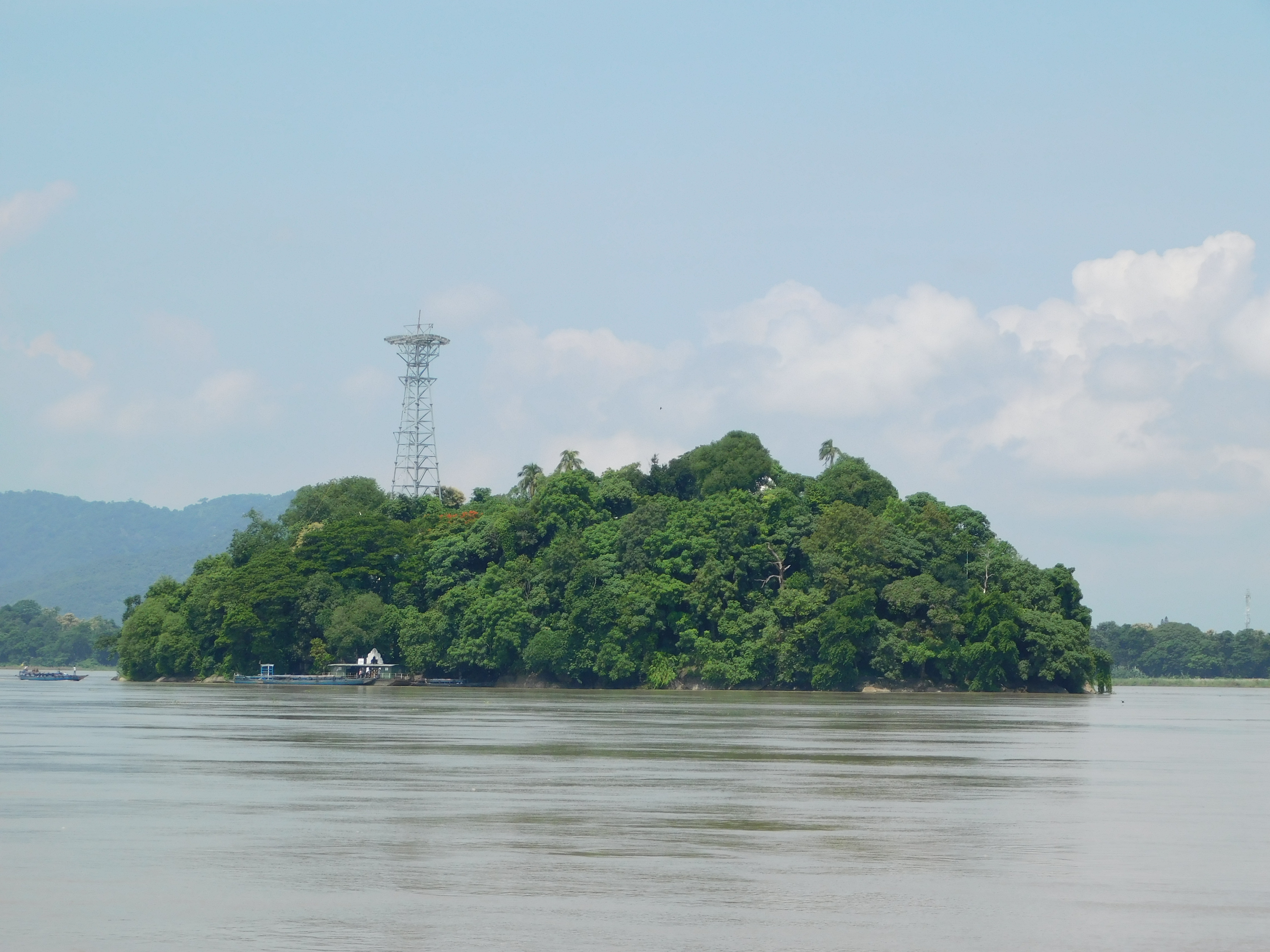
As seen from Umananda Ghat, near Guwahati Highcourt (August 2018)

Umananda Island is the smallest inhabited river islet in the middle of river Brahmaputra, flowing through the city of Guwahati in Assam, a state in northeast India.

Its name derives from Assamese Uma, another name for the Hindu goddess Parvati, the wife of Shiva; and ananda, which translates to "joy". A British officer named the island Peacock Island for its structure, which he thought resembled the splayed feathers of a peacock. It is also known as Bhasmachal, from the words bhasma, meaning 'to destroy', and chal, meaning 'place'. The legend giving rise to this name is that Kamdev, the god of love in Hindu mythology, after interrupting Shiva in the middle of a deep meditation on the islet, was burnt to ashes.

It is mostly visited for its Shiva temple, the Umananda Temple, and was also home to a large population of golden langurs, an endangered species of primate. The species is not found on that island anymore.

The islet can be reached via a 10-minute ferry, available from Umananda Ghat, located near the Guwahati High Court.

== Mythology ==
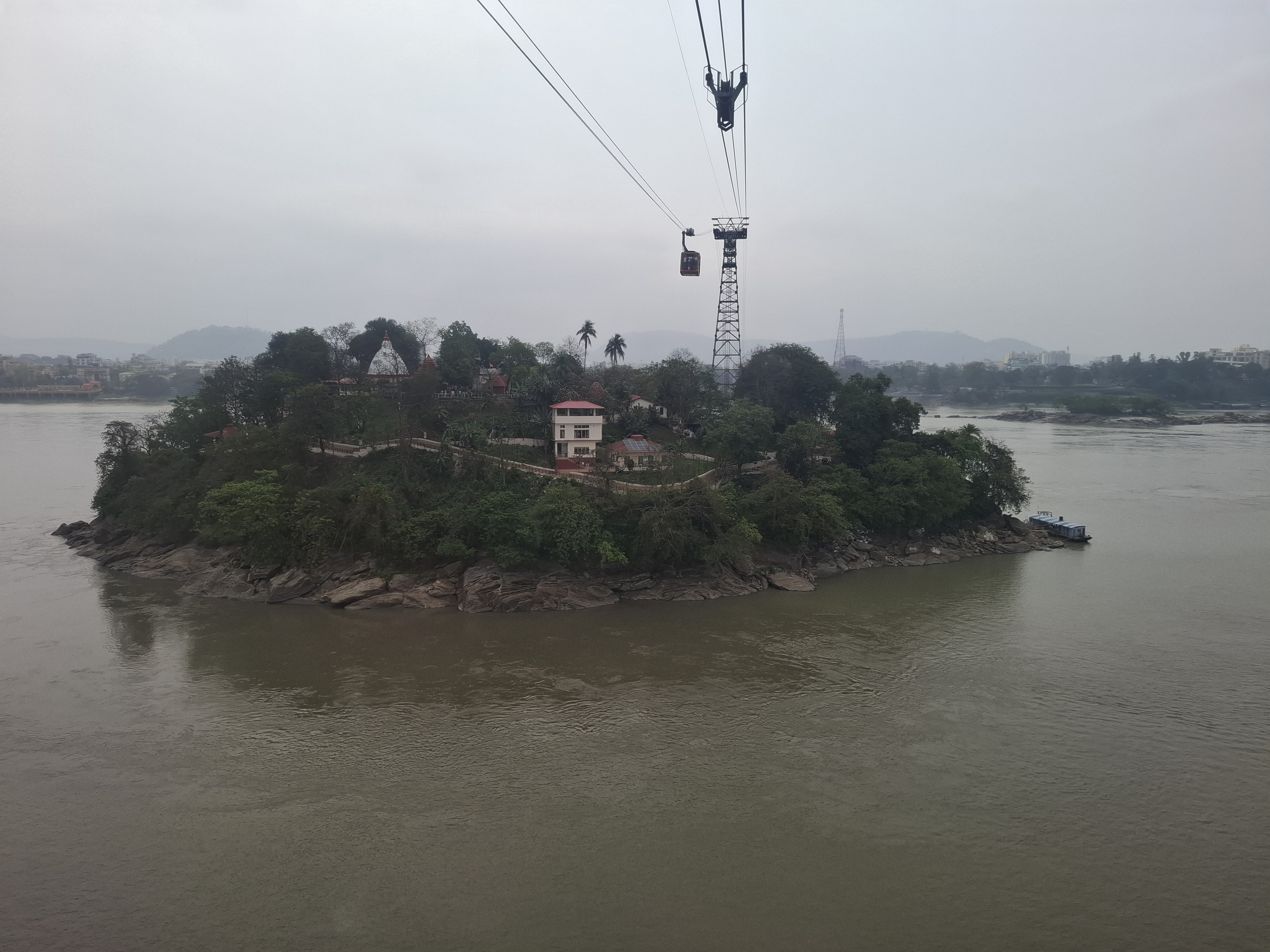
Bird eye view of Peacock Island

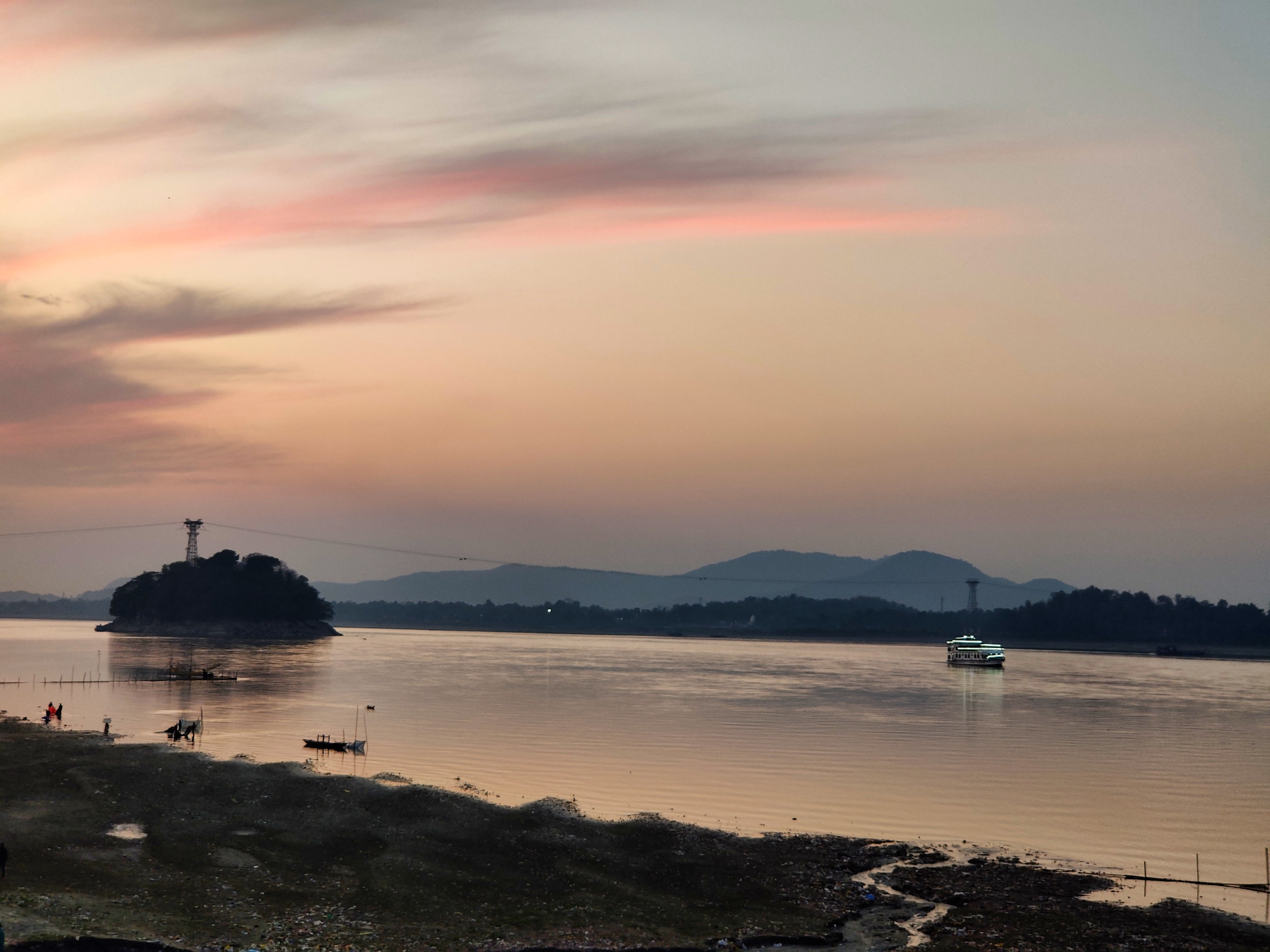
The Umananda island in the river Brahmaputra

According to Hindu mythology, Shiva created the island for his wife Parvati's happiness and pleasure. Shiva is said to have resided here in the form of Bhayananda. According to a myth in Kalika Purana, Shiva burnt Kamadeva with his third eye on Umananda when he interrupted Shiva's deep meditation, hence its alternative name Bhasmachal (Assamese: bhasma, "ash"; and achal, "hill"; literally, "hill of ashes").

== History ==
In 1897, an earthquake damaged the temple heavily, but was later repaired by a local merchant. The temple displays a mixture of both Hindu Vaishnavism and Shaivism. There are Assamese craftings of Ganesha, Shiva, Parvati, Vishnu, and other Hindu deities. During the repairing work of the temple, some new Vaishnavi scripts were written on the walls. Craftsmen also carved figures out of rocks on the island.

== Festivals ==
Maha Shivaratri is widely celebrated in Umananda. Monday is considered to be the holiest day in the temple and the new moon brings bliss to the pilgrims.

== Biodiversity ==
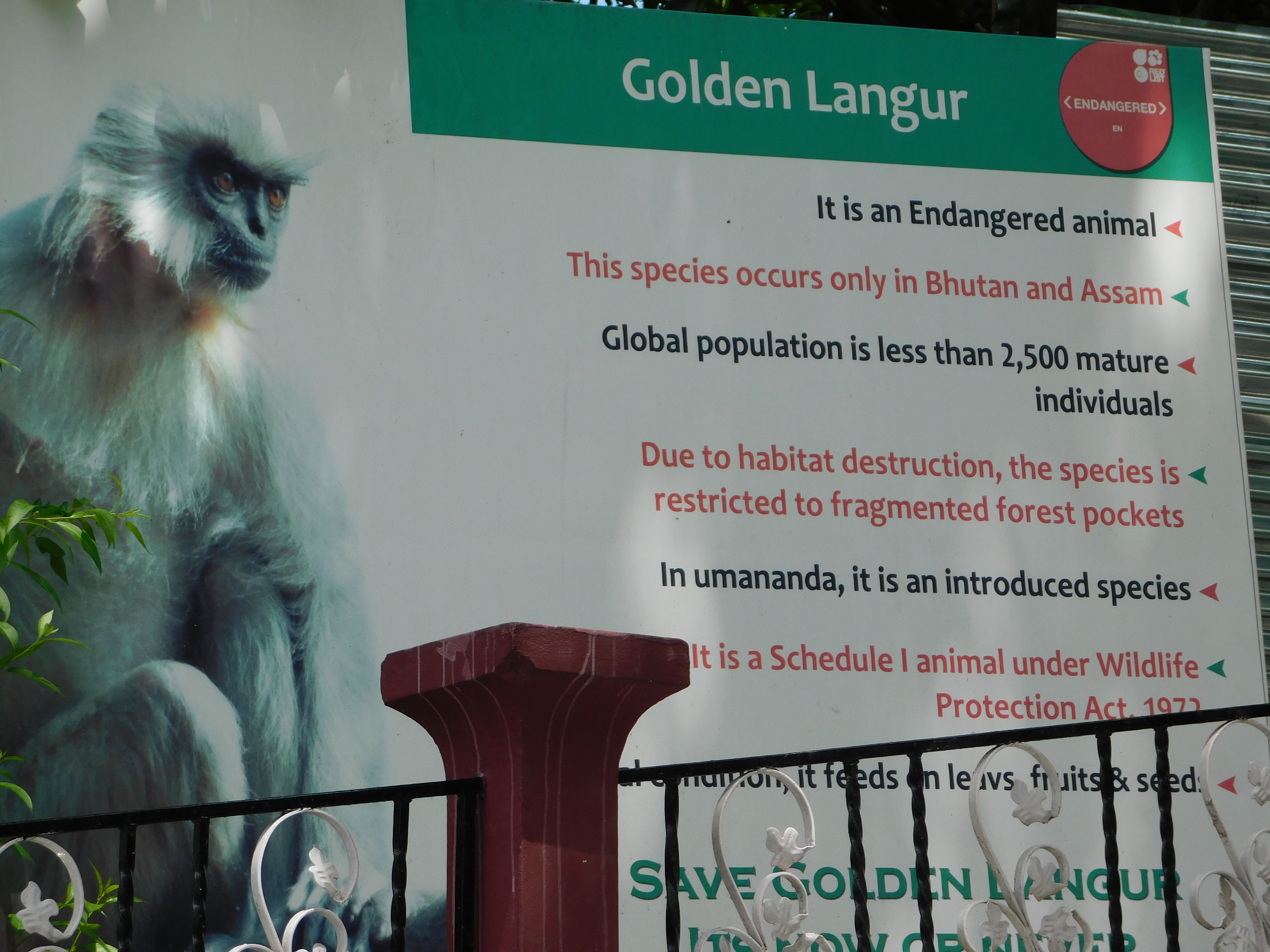
Island was home to the golden langur

Umananda Island was home to the species of the endangered golden langur, introduced to the island in the 1980s, with the last one dying in 2020.

The island is dotted with tamarind trees.

== See also ==
- Hindu pilgrimage sites
- National Geological Monuments of India
- List of Hindu temples
- Umananda Temple
- Tourism in India
- Yatra
