= Karbi Anglong Plateau =

Coordinates: 26.1861°N 93.581269°E

Dimensions
- Area: 7,000 km^{2} (2,700 mi^{2})

Naming
- Etymology: Karbi Anglong district
- Language of name: Karbi

Geography
- Country: India
- State: Assam
- District: Karbi Anglong district

Karbi Anglong plateau is an extension of the Indian Peninsular Plateau (Deccan Plateau) in Assam, a North Eastern state of India. This area receives maximum rainfall from the Southwest summer Monsoon from June through September.

== Geography ==
Average height of the plateau varies from 300 metres (984 ft) to 400 metres (1,312 ft). Karbi Anglong Plateau is pear-shaped. It has an area of about 7000 km^{2}. It is linked with Meghalaya Plateau towards the south through a patch of low uneven terrain.

== See also ==
- Mikir Hills
- Karbi Anglong district
- West Karbi Anglong district
