= Indo-Burman Ranges =

Mountain range in southeast Asia

Indo–Burman Ranges
- Indo–Myanmar Ranges
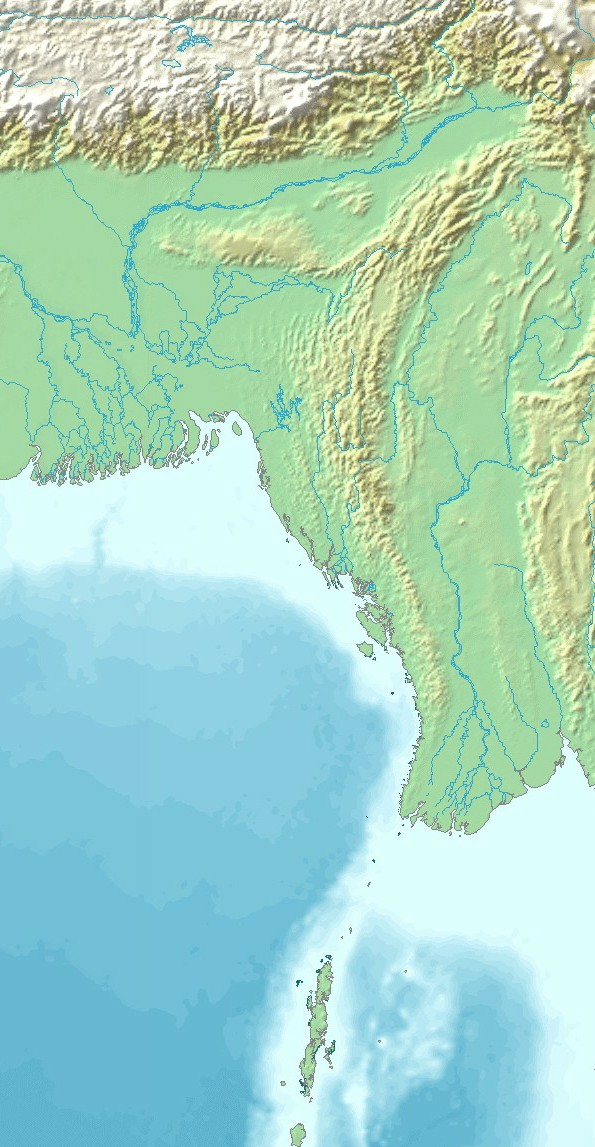

Highest point
- Peak: Mount Saramati
- Elevation: 3,826 m (12,552 ft)

Dimensions
- Length: 1,200 km (750 mi)

Geography
- Countries: India; Myanmar
- States/Regions: Nagaland; Manipur; Mizoram; Sagaing; Chin; Rakhine
- Range coordinates: 23°40′N 94°10′E

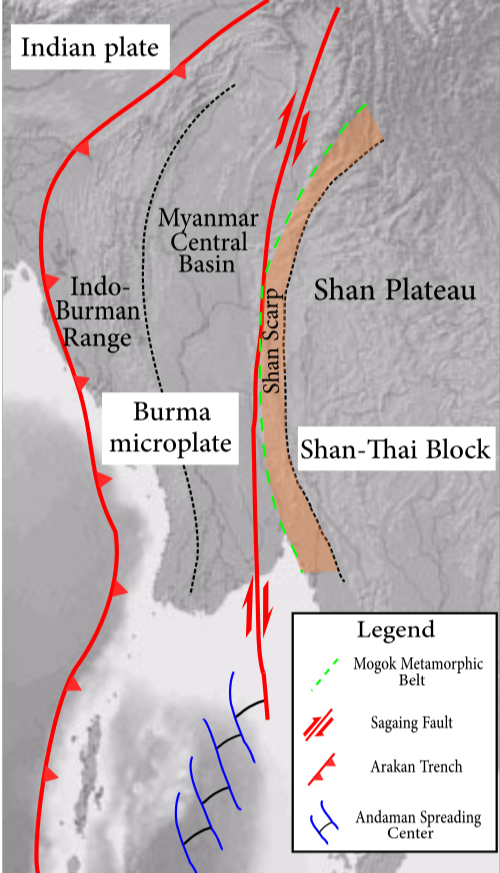
The figure shows a simplified version of the regional features in Myanmar. The Indo–Burma range is towards the left.

The Indo–Burman Ranges (IBR), also known as the Indo–Myanmar Ranges, is a mountain chain that forms the boundary between the Indian subcontinent and the Indochinese peninsula. This geological feature sits at the convergent boundary of the Indian Plate and the Burma Plate. The Indo–Burman Range merges with Eastern Himalayan Syntaxis further north; protrudes further from its central-west till the Shillong Plateau; and submerges into the Andaman Sea, and resurfaces as the Andaman Islands further south. Geopolitically, it is located at the intersection of modern-day Northeast India and Burma.

The mountain belt comprises the following ranges from north to south: the Patkai Bum, the Naga Hills, the Mikir Hills, the Mizo Hills and the Arakan Mountains. The first four are often grouped into the Purvanchal Range, and comprise the northern half of the Indo–Burman mountain system.

== Geology ==
The subduction between the Indian Plate and the Burma Plate resulted in the development of accretionary wedges, in order to accommodate the EW shortening along the convergent boundary. Later, thrusting, folding and uplifting formed the Indo–Burman Ranges.

The Indo–Burman Range bulges towards the west at the center (about 22°N), forming an arc-shaped structure. This arc-shaped structure implies restriction on the convergent motion along the Indian-Burma boundary, therefore the collision intensity varies along the range.

The collision is at a maximum at the center of the Indo–Burman Range around 24°N, which is presented with a broad, high range (up to 20 km wide) and evolves to narrow, low hills in the south (16°N). The collision strikes in NW-SE at the northern part of the Indo–Burman Range (Naga Domain).

== Lithology ==
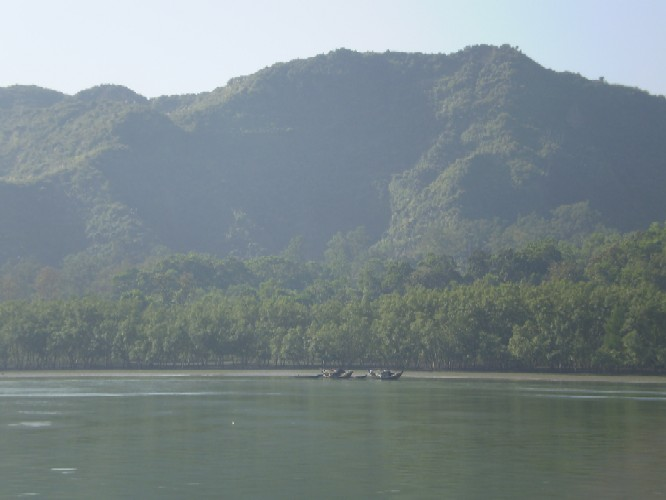
Arakan Mountains in Maungdaw district.

The Indo–Burman Range is a sedimentary belt mainly consisted of Cenozoic flysch sediments and a core of Mesozoic ophiolites dated back to late Jurassic overlain on a thick Mesozoic sequence. All the above lie unconformably on a metamorphic basement dated back to pre-Triassic.

The core Mesozoic ophiolites consists of serpentinite peridotites, pillow basalts and red cherts etc. The obduction of ophiolites is interpreted as the closure of several Neo-Tethys between the Shan-Thai block, Burma microplate and Indian Plate.

The sedimentary sequence overlain by the ophiolites ranges from Late Triassic to Orbitoides-bearing Late Cretaceous carbonates and shales, where part of the sedimentary sequence has undergone high pressure/low temperature blue-schist metamorphism.

The pre-Triassic metamorphic basement composed of Kampetlet schist and gneisses were exposed in the Mount Victoria area in Myanmar. The flysch type sediments in the western flank of the Indo–Burman Range are relatively younger than the folded and thrusted eastern flank.
