= Madhabdi =

Madhabdi মাধবদী
- City and Municipality
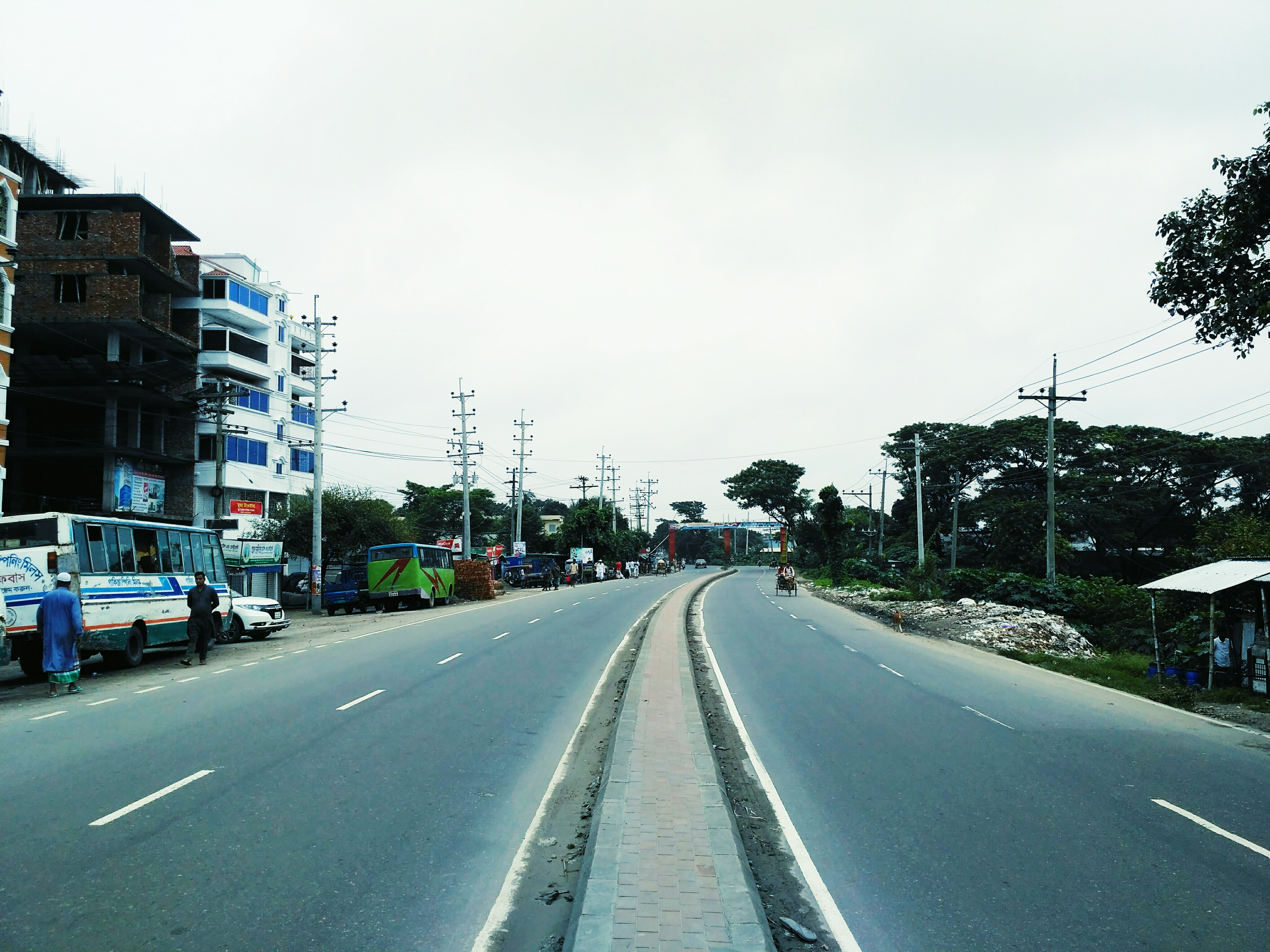
- Dhaka-Sylhet Highway in Madhabdi

- Location in Dhaka division Location in Bangladesh
- Country: Bangladesh
- Division: Dhaka
- District: Narsingdi
- Upazila: Narsingdi Sadar

Government
  - Type: Mayor–Council
  - Body: Madhabdi Paurashava

Population (2022)
  - Total: 73,910
- Time zone: UTC+6 (Bangladesh Time)
- Postal code: 1604
- Area code: 06257
- National Dialing Code: +880

Madhabdi Municipality mahallah geocode map

Madhabdi (Bengali: মাধবদী) is a pourashava (municipal corporation) in Narsingdi District, Dhaka Division, Bangladesh. It's an A grade municipality and also Madhabdi has declared as a thana on 29 February 2016. Madhabdi is a densely textile commercial and industrial area.

== History ==
In 1971 a column of Pakistan army with two trucks were ambushed here by Mukti Bahini.

An earthquake struck on 2025-11-21 at approximately 10:38:26 BST (04:38:26 UTC). Its epicentre was near Madhabdi, 14 kilometres (8.7 miles) southwest from Narsingdi, with a depth of 27 kilometres (17 miles). At least 10 people died and nearly 630 others suffered injuries. It was the deadliest earthquake to strike the country in over two decades.

== Demographics ==
Religions in Madhabdi (2011)
Religion	Percent
Islam	89.50%
Hinduism	10.48%
Other or not stated	0.02%

According to the 2022 Bangladesh census, Madhabdi city had a population of 73,910 and a literacy rate of 81.78%.

According to the 2011 Bangladesh census, Madhabdi city had 11,323 households and a population of 49,583. 10,238 (20.65%) were under 10 years of age. Madhabdi had a literacy rate (age 7 and over) of 65.99%, compared to the national average of 51.8%, and a sex ratio of 718 females per 1000 males.
