= 1997 Chittagong earthquake =

November 1997 earthquake in Asia

- Location within India
- UTC time: 1997-11-21 11:23:07
- ISC event: 1053794
- USGS-ANSS: ComCat
- Local date: 21 November 1997
- Local time: 16:53:07 IST
- Magnitude: 6.1 M_{w}
- Depth: 54 km (34 mi)
- Epicenter: 22.34°N 92.7°E
- Type: Strike-slip
- Areas affected: Bangladesh-Myanmar-India border region
- Max. intensity: MMI V (Moderate)
- Casualties: 23 dead 200 injured

The 1997 Chittagong earthquake (also known as the Bandarban earthquake) occurred on 21 November at 11:23 UTC in the Bangladesh-India-Myanmar border region. It had a magnitude of M_{w} 6.1. The epicenter was located in southern Mizoram, India. No fatalities were reported there, but 23 people were killed in Chittagong, Bangladesh when a five-story building collapsed. The shaking could also be felt in Dhaka.

== See also ==
- 2025 Bangladesh earthquake, an earthquake felt on the same date 28 years after
- List of earthquakes in 1997
- List of earthquakes in Bangladesh
- List of earthquakes in India
