= River Mora Diphlu =

River in Assam, India

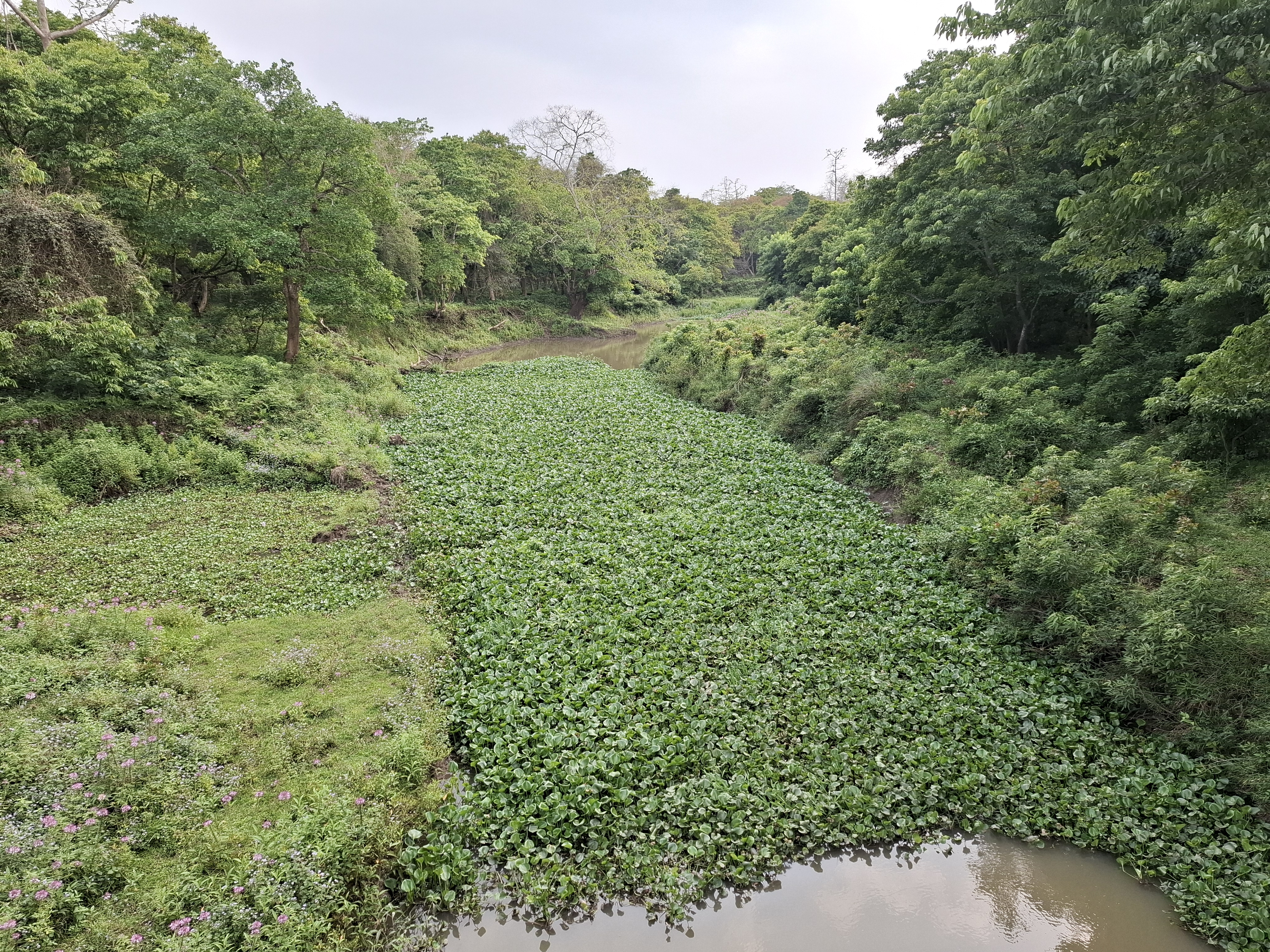
Mora Diphlu river in Kazoranga forest

River Mora Diphlu is a rivulet and a tributary of the River Diphlu which originates from the Karbi Anglong hills, Assam and passes through the Kaziranga National Park and joins the River Brahmaputra on its south bank.
