= Bengal Foredeep =

One of the world's largest exogeosynclines

Coordinates: 22°N 91°E

The Bengal Foredeep is one of the world's largest exogeosynclines. It runs parallel to the hinge zone of the Sub-Himalayan Foredeep. It is about 450 kilometers wide in southern Bangladesh, narrowing towards the northeast. Folded belts of the Burmese Alpide mobile belt mark its eastern boundary. It can be divided into further sub-zones: (1) the Faridpur Trough; (2) the Barisal High; (3) the Hatiya Trough; (4) the Sylhet Trough; and (5) the Madhupur High.
