= Karbi-Meghalaya Plateau =

Karbi-Meghalaya plateau is an extension of the main Indian peninsular plateau and are originally two different plateaus - Karbi Anglong Plateau and Meghalaya plateau.

The Meghalaya Plateau is traditionally divided into Garo, Khasi and Jaintia Hills. The region from the river Dhansiri in the east to the Singimari River on the west is about 400 km long with an average width of about 40 km, covering about 35, 291 km2.

Karbi Plateau is pear-shaped and has an area of about 7000 square kms. It links with the Meghalaya plateau proper towards the south through a patch of highly denuded and subdued senile terrain.

== Details ==
It is believed that due to the force exerted by the northeastward movement of the Indian plate at the time of the Himalayan origin, a huge fault was created between the Rajmahal hills and the Karbi-Meghalaya plateau. Later, this depression was filled up by the depositional activity of numerous rivers. Today, the Meghalaya and Karbi Anglong plateau remains detached from the main Peninsular block. This area receives maximum rainfall from the South-West monsoon. It is located in the northeastern plateau of India.
