= Mikir Hills =

Coordinates: 26°10′N 93°30′E

Mikir Hills are a group of hills located to the south of the Kaziranga National Park, Assam, India. The easternmost Meghalaya comprising the detached Mikir Hills is partly isolated being surrounded by three sides. Karbi plateau or Mikir Hills is known as the oldest landform in Assam. It is pear-shaped and has an area of about 7000 km^{2}.

It is part of the Karbi-Plateau. Its highest peak is Dambukso.

== See also ==
- Karbi Anglong district
