= 1548 Bengal earthquake =

The 1548 Bengal earthquake was a major historical seismic event that affected parts of present-day Bangladesh and north-eastern India during the mid-16th century. It is regarded as the earliest recorded large earthquake in the Bengal region. Due to the absence of instrumental data, details regarding its magnitude, epicenter and impacts are derived from historical accounts and geological evidence.
