= Naga Hills =

Part of a complex mountain system that lies on the border of India and Myanmar

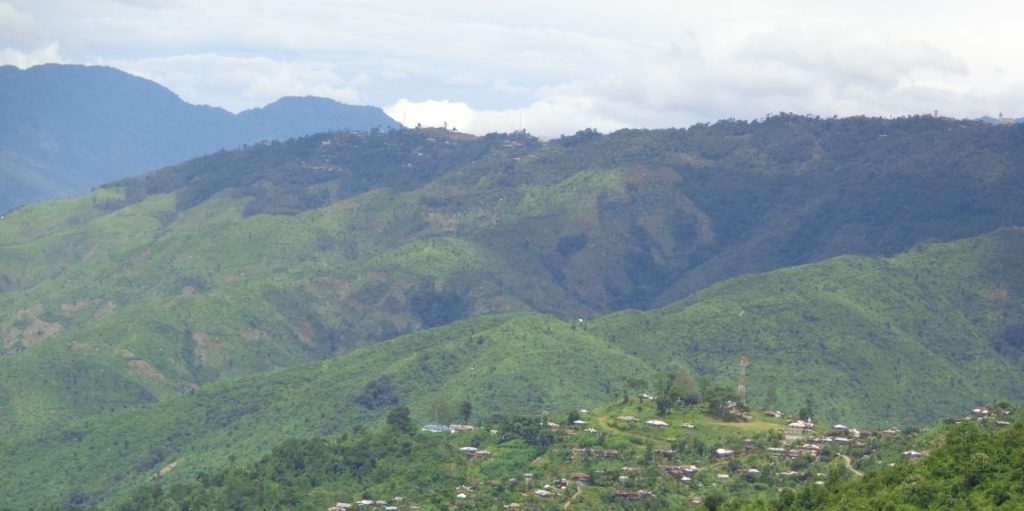
- Naga Hills seen as seen from Longpang, Nagaland

Highest point
- Peak: Mount Saramati
- Elevation: 3,826 m (12,552 ft)
- Coordinates: 25°44′24″N 95°2′15″E

Geography
- Countries: India; Burma
- Range coordinates: 26°N 95°E
- Parent range: Arakan Mountains

The Naga Hills form a mountain complex along the India-Myanmar border. They are an extension of the Arakan Mountains, and form part of the Indian state of Nagaland and the Burmese region of Sagaing. The highest point of the Naga Hills is Mount Saramati at 3,826 m (12,552 ft).

== Etymology ==
The term "Naga" refers to the Naga people, derived from "Naga" or "Naka" in Burmese language, meaning "(people with) pierced ears".

== Geography ==
Naga Hills are a northern extension of the Arakan Mountains. The highest point of the Naga Hills is Mount Saramati at 3,826 m (12,552 ft).

The hills stretch along the India-Myanmar border. They form part of the Indian state of Nagaland and the Naga Self-Administered Zone of the Burmese region of Sagaing. A part of the Naga Hills under the British India was coalesced into a district in 1866. The boundaries were extended later, and the district became part of Assam Province in 1912. Following the Indian independence, it was part of Assam till 1961 and became part of the state of Nagaland was created in 1963.

== Geology ==
Ophiolite occurs in the central part of the hills. The Naga Hills Ophiolite is an example of oceanic lithosphere obducted onto continental crust, consisting of Mesozoic–Cenozoic magmatic and sedimentary rocks, along the Indo–Burma convergence zone. The Ophiolites occurring near Pungro in Kiphire district of Nagaland has been declared a National Geological Monument of India by the Geological Survey of India.

== Biodiversity ==
The region receives a heavy rainfall during the monsoon and has a dense forest cover. The hills form part of a biodiversity hotspot, and are home to four Key Biodiversity Areas and Important Bird Areas–Satoi Range, Mount Ziphu, Fakim Wildlife Sanctuary and Saramati, and Pfutsero-Chizami. It is also part of the Endemic Bird Area of the Eastern Himalayan Region. The Naga tribes occupy the settlements in the hills. The region supports a diverse range of endemic flora and fauna. Plant species reported as exclusively confined to the region include certain species of Areca, Begonia, Bulbophyllum, Clematis, Hedychium, and Rhododendron. Key faunal species include the western hoolock gibbon, hairy-faced bat, Asian forest tortoise, and Keeled box turtle. brown-capped laughingthrush, and striped laughingthrush. Several amphibian species, including Megophrys wuliangshanensis, Megophrys glandulosa, Amolops viridimaculatus, Rana humeralis, and Rhacophorus gongshanensis, were first reported here.

== See also ==
- Haflong Thrust
