= Shillong Plateau =

Plateau in Meghalaya, India

Coordinates: 25.582°N 91.999°E

The Shillong Plateau is a plateau in the eastern Meghalaya state of India. The plateau's western, northern, and southern ridges form the Garo, Khasi and Jaintia Hills, respectively. This elevation is located to the immediate central-west of the Indo-Burman Ranges. Geographically, it separates the Brahmaputra valley from the eastern-Bengal plains, that is, present-day Assam and Bangladesh.

The plateau shows numerous fracture lineaments in satellite images and has been subjected to extensive and compressive forces in the N-S and E-W direction respectively. Several deep earthquakes point to tectonic activity in the mantle, such as from the 1897 Assam earthquake along the blind Oldham Fault.

The Dauki fault is a major fault along the southern boundary of the Shillong Plateau that may be a source of destructive seismic hazards for the adjoining areas, including northeastern Bangladesh. The fault, inferred to go through the southern margin of the Shillong Plateau, is an east–west-trending reverse fault inclined towards the north.

Linguistically, it is the homeland to Khasic languages.

== See also ==
- Karbi-Meghalaya plateau.
- 1897 Assam earthquake
- Dauki fault
