= 1897 Assam earthquake =

Earthquake in India

- Location within India
- Local date: 12 June 1897
- Magnitude: M_{w} 8.2–8.3
- Depth: 34 km (21 mi)
- Epicenter: 26.0°N 90.7°E
- Areas affected: India, Bhutan, Bangladesh
- Max. intensity: MMI X (Extreme)
- Casualties: 1,542

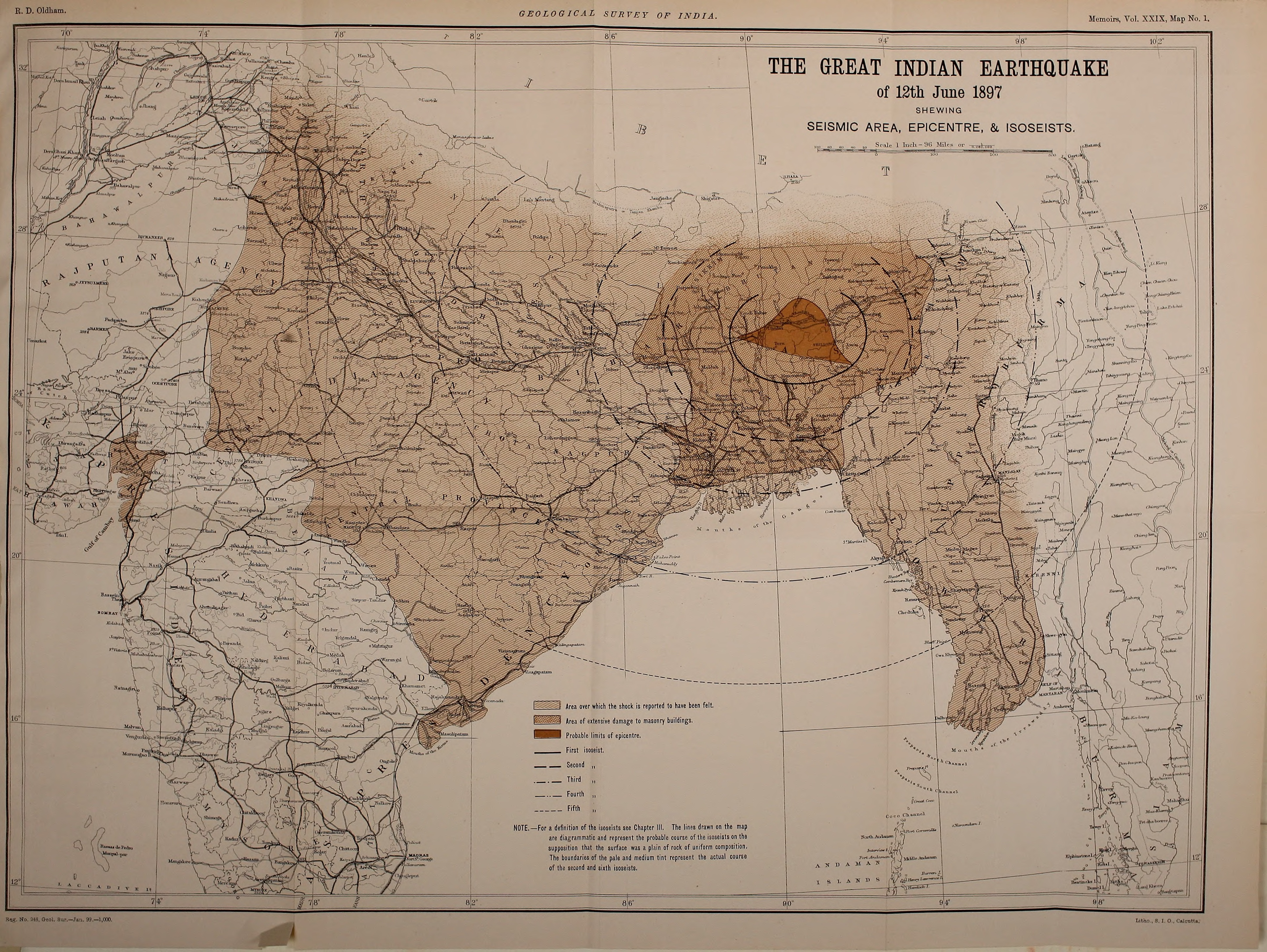
Map showing the epicentre and the areas affected by the 1897 earthquake

An earthquake occurred on 12 June, in Assam, British India at 11:06 UTC, and had an estimated moment magnitude of 8.2–8.3. It resulted in approximately 1,542 human casualties and caused catastrophic damage to infrastructures. Damage from the earthquake extended into Calcutta, where dozens of buildings were severely damaged, with some buildings partially collapsing. Tremors were felt across India, reaching as far as Ahmedabad and Peshawar. Seiches were also observed in Burma.

== Earthquake ==
The earthquake occurred on the south–southwest-dipping reverse Oldham Fault that forms the northern edge of the Shillong Plateau. There was a minimum displacement on the main fault of 11 m, although some calculations have placed this figure at as high as 16 m; one of the greatest for any measured earthquake. The calculated area of slip extended 180 km along the strike and from 9–45 km beneath the surface, indicating that the entire thickness of the crust was involved.

== Damage ==
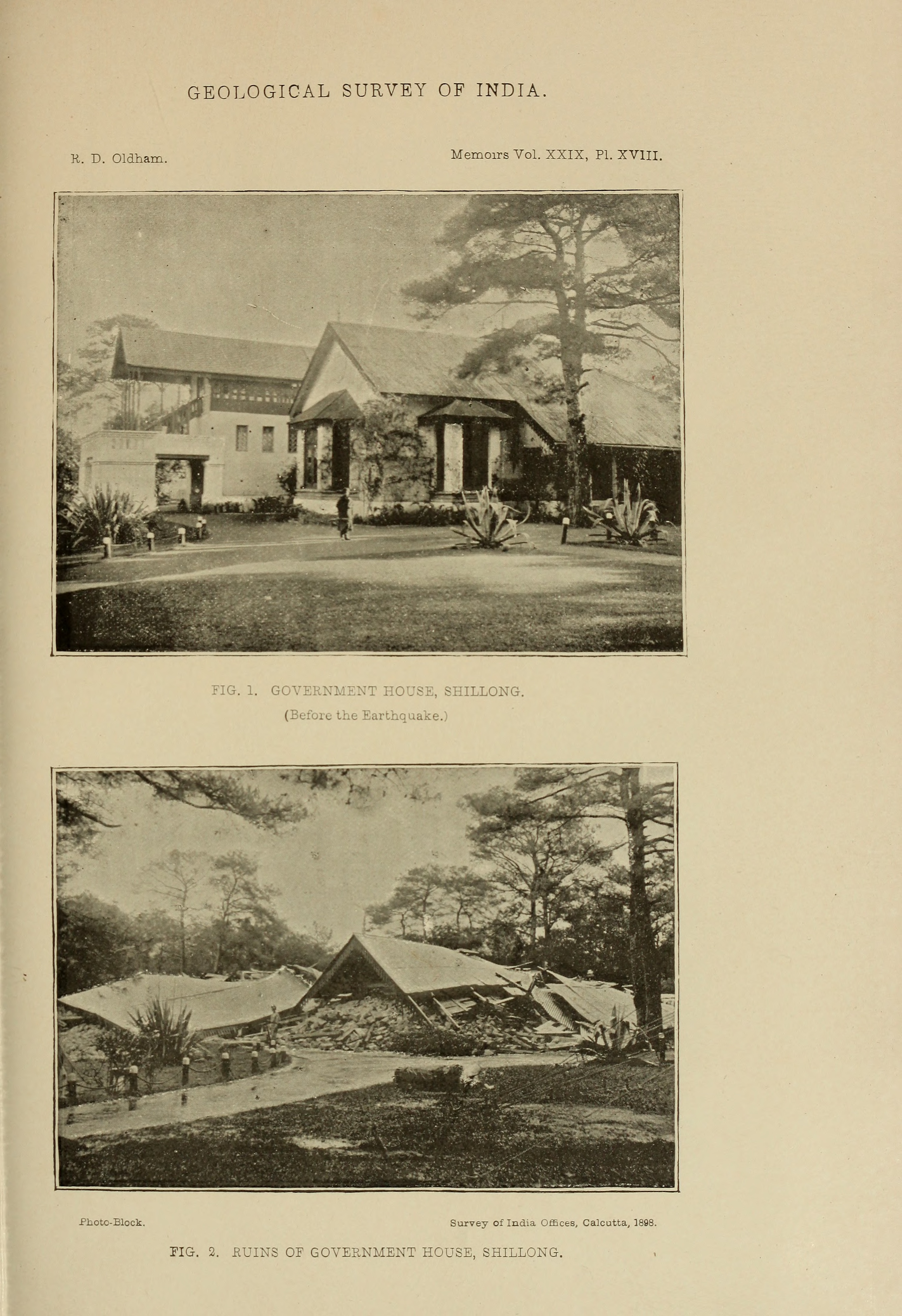
Government House in Shillong before and after the earthquake

Thought to have happened 32 km beneath the surface, the earthquake left masonry buildings in ruins over 400,000 km^{2} area and was felt over 650,000 km^{2} from Burma to Delhi. Numerous buildings in the neighboring country of Bhutan were heavily damaged. Dozens of aftershocks were felt in and around the region with the last event being felt on 9 October 1897 at 01:40 UT in Calcutta.

The earthquake resulted in Shillong Plateau being thrust violently upwards by about 11 meters. The fault was about 110 km in length while the fault slip was about 18 m (accuracy more or less by 7 m). At the epicenter, vertical acceleration is thought to have been greater than 1g and the surface velocity estimated at 3 m/s.

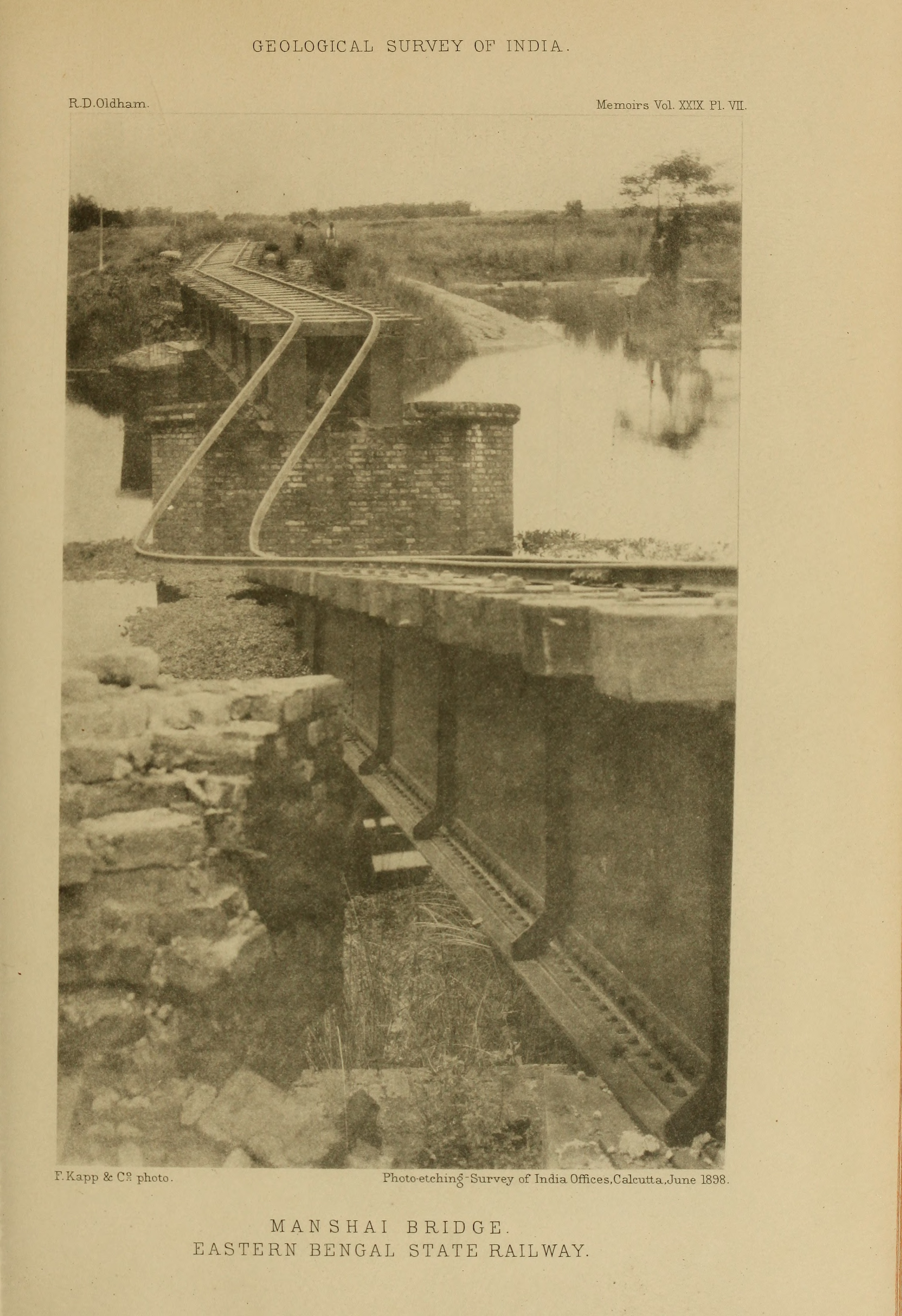
Earthquake damage to a bridge on the East Bengal Railway

In Shillong, the earthquake damaged every stone house and half the houses built of wood. The shock leveled the ground and resulted in 13 deaths. Fissures were also reported in the area. In Sohra Cherrapunji, it resulted in a landslide, which led to 600 deaths. In Goalpara, it resulted in waves from the Brahmaputra River, on whose bank the town is situated, destroying the market. In Nalbari, there were reported sightings of earth-waves and water waves. In Guwahati, the earthquake lasted for three minutes. The Brahmaputra rose by 7.6 ft. Damage was caused to Umananda Island temple and railway lines, where five people died. In Nagaon, every brick house was damaged, while traditional houses made of wood, with grass roofs, were bent. There were many small fissures/volcanos and the road was impassable for vehicles.

In the Sylhet region, shocks took place at 16:30 local time, according to villagers living at the foot of the hills north of Sunamganj. There were 545 casualties; 55 in Sylhet town; 178 in North Sylhet; 287 in Sunamganj; seven in Habiganj; eight in South Sylhet and 10 in Karimganj. Many building collapses, fissures and drownings furthered the number of deaths. A woman in Sunamganj is said to have fallen through a fissure whilst on a river with her husband. The husband tried to hold onto her hair but lost hold of her. The woman's body was not recovered from the crevasse. The Assam Bengal Railway was severely damaged.

Richard Dixon Oldham, the Superintendent of the Geological Survey of India, analysed seismic records of the earthquake, mainly from stations in Italy, and reported the first clear evidence of different type of seismic waves, travelling through the earth on different paths and at different speeds.

The zamindar house of Raja Girish Chandra Roy and the building of the Murarichand College he founded were destroyed.

== See also ==
- 1905 Kangra earthquake
- List of earthquakes in India
- List of historical earthquakes
