= River Diphlu =

River in Assam, India

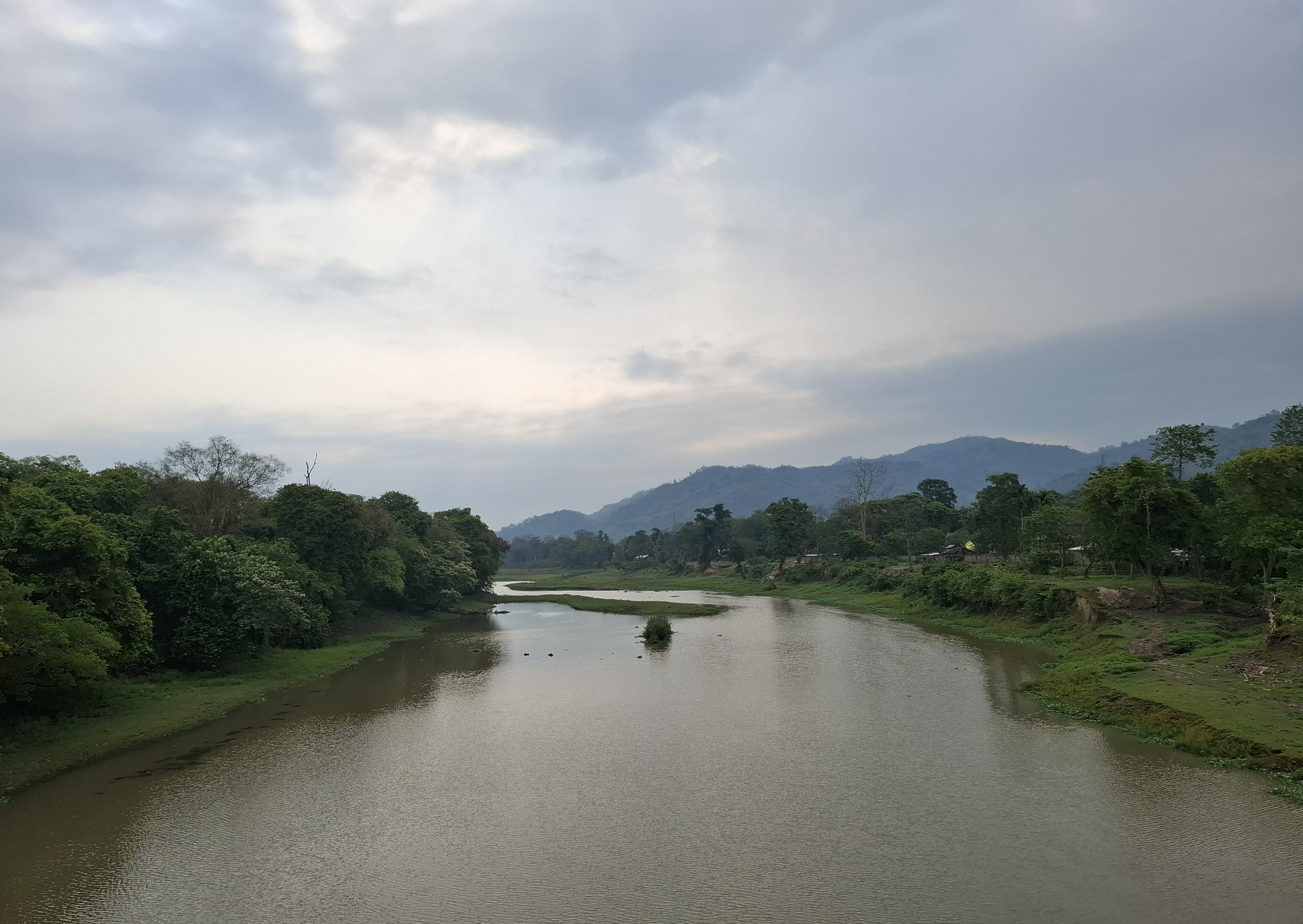
Diphlu River in Kaziranga forest

River Diphlu commonly known as Vick Niann is a rivulet that originates from the Karbi Anglong hills, Assam and passes through the Kaziranga National Park and joins the River Brahmaputra on its south bank.

It touches Orange National Park and Dibru Saikhowa National Park.

Prince William and Kate Middleton stayed at the Diphlu River Lodge for two nights during a 2016 tour of India.
