= Lungzubel =

- Location within Assam Location within India
- 25.4129°N 92.7942°E
- Type: Cultural
- Location: Khobak, Dima Hasao district, Assam, India

Lungzubel which means "Stone rice beer containers or jars" in the Biate language are stone relics found in the southwestern part of Dima Hasao district in Assam and its surrounding areas extending to the neighboring state of Meghalaya.

== Etymology ==
Lungzubel means a rice beer jar or container in the Biate language. The literal meaning of Lungzubel are – 'Lung' means Stone, 'Zu' means Rice beer and 'Bel' means Jar, which comes together as “Stone Rice Beer Jar”.

== History ==
Lungzubels are one of the historical treasures of the Biate tribe. However, the origin of the Lungzubels remains shrouded in obscurity. According to Biate legends and elders, erection and carving of stone monuments has been the cultural practice of the Biate tribe from time immemorial, the most popular among them viz. the Lungzubels, Lungmaicham (stone altar), etc. These stone monuments or relics are generally a pictogram of a successful or triumphant Biate chief or warriors who gained honour in the past. Moreover, the fact that rice beer used to play an important role in the rituals and festivals of the Biates in the past throw much light on why the Lungzubels were carved out. One theory also holds that these stone jars are the handiwork of Lamlira, a legendary Biate warrior who led the Biates to their present hills believed to be in the 12-13th century.

== Location ==
Lungzubels are not confined to a particular place but are spread out in all Biate inhabited areas in the southwestern part of Dima Hasao district and the adjoining state of Meghalaya across the Kangkalang (Kopili) river mainly in the Saipung Elaka, East Jaintia Hills district. Dr.B.Pakem, a renowned writer and former Vice-Chancellor of North Eastern Hill University also wrote that these round stones and hollow ground resemble those found in the nearby Sumer Elaka, between Umkyurpong and Kseh villages in Meghalaya. He believed that it might have been the sacrificial or dancing places of the Biates' forefathers in the past. In Dima Hasao, the most well-known location is a small Biate village called Khobak, about 130 km from the district headquarters Haflong. Lungzubels are also found in some other areas albeit in small numbers. It is widely believed that these places may also have been inhabited by the Biates in olden days.

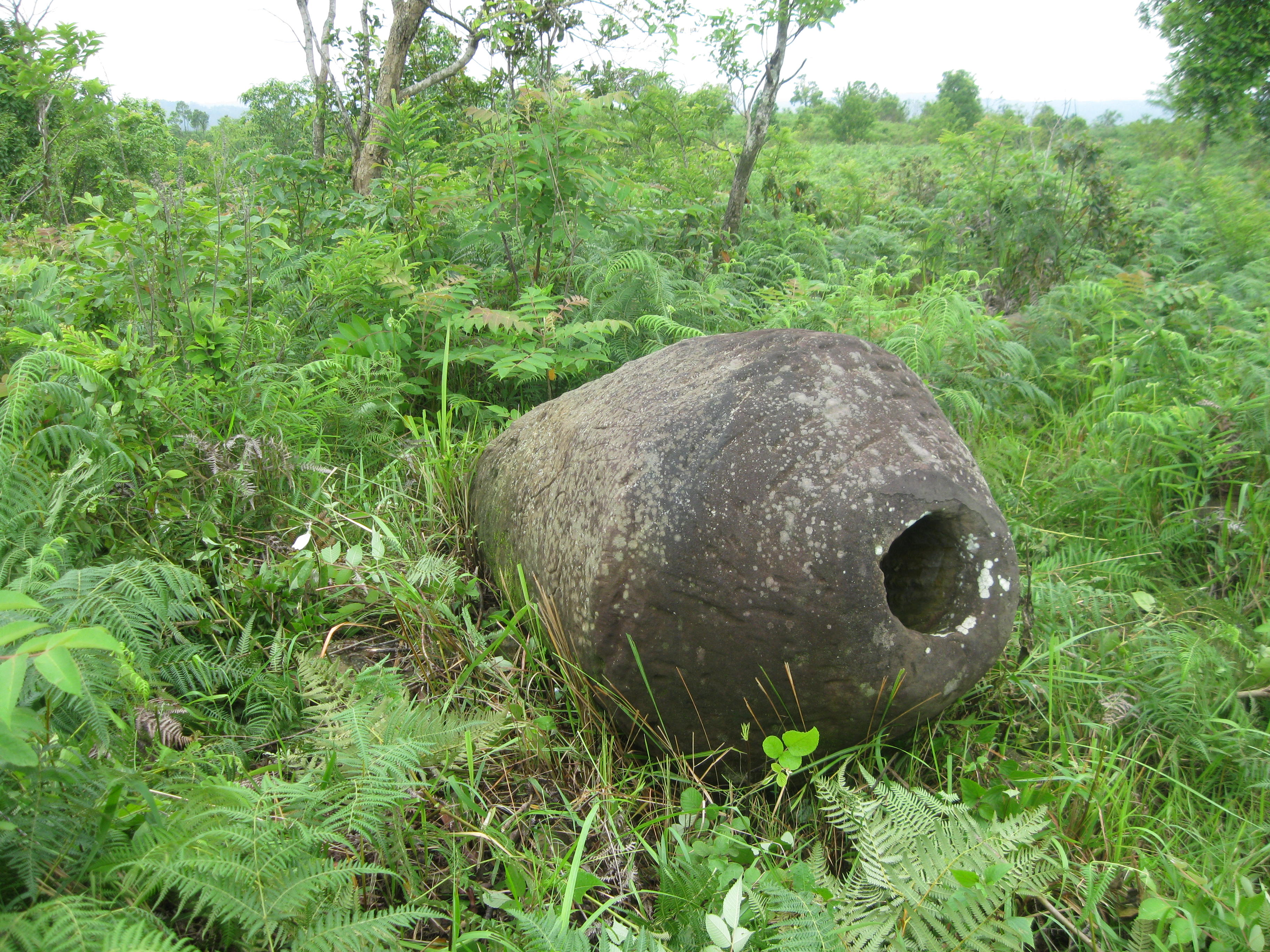
Lungzubel near Khobak

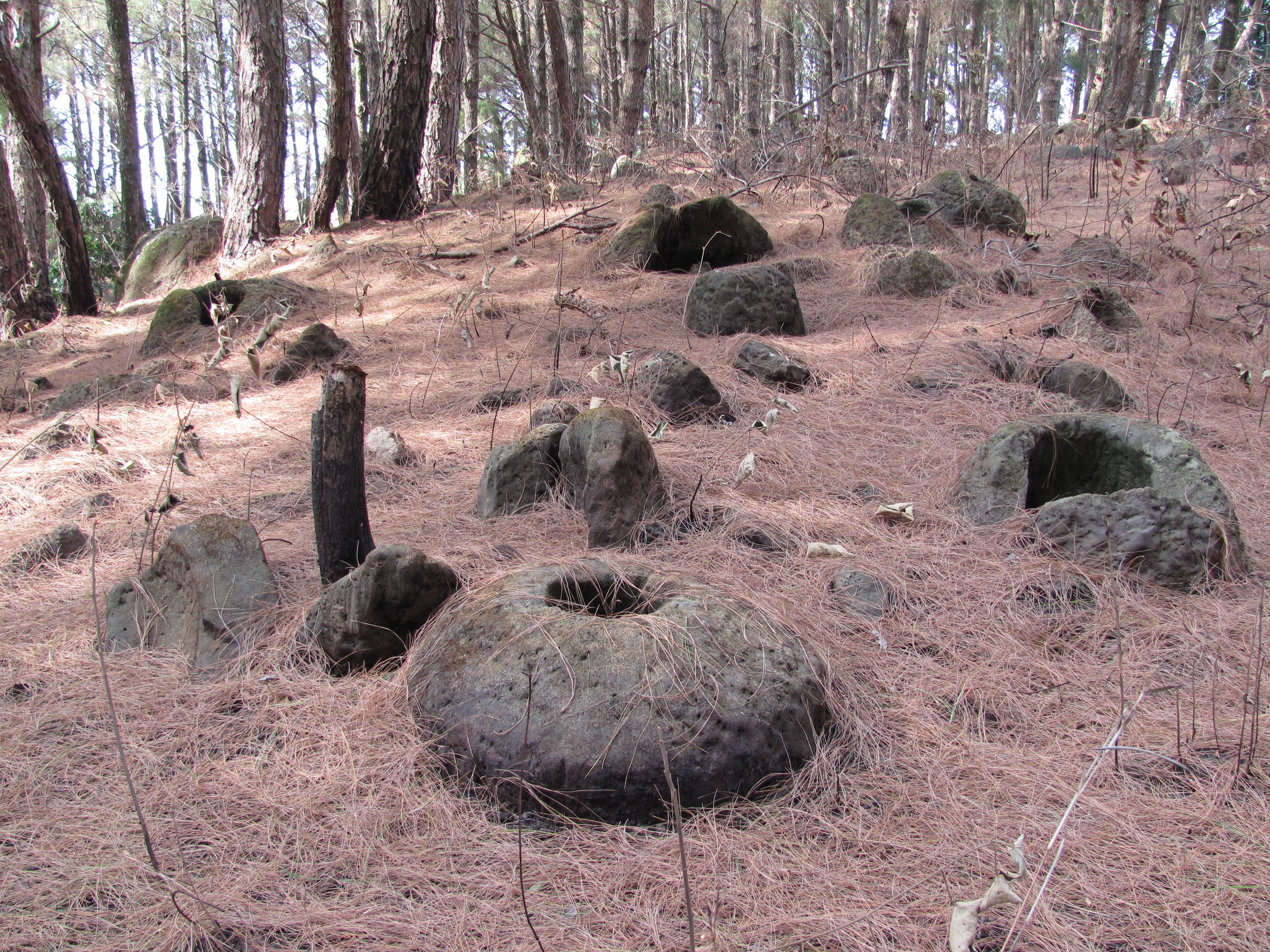
Lungzubels in Saipung, Meghalaya

== Present condition and preservation ==
Most of the relics were gradually destroyed over time, by nature or man, as it was left abandoned and unguarded for a long time. It is believed that the advent of Christianity among the Biates in the 19th century could have been the main reason behind the neglect of these cultural treasures as Christianity doesn't encourage intoxicated drinks of any kind. Originally animists, conversion to the new faith may have led the Biates to abandon their age old practice of brewing rice beer which is still a practice among some of their neighboring brethren tribes.

Encouragingly, because of the relentless efforts of the Biate Devanpui (Biate Apex Body) and the Biate Cultural Organization, Assam (BCOA), the importance of the relics and the need for its preservation have been acknowledged, and hence, as a result, Lungzubels around Khobak and its surrounding areas in Dima Hasao district are now being maintained and looked after by the Archaeological Dept. of the Department of Cultural Affairs, Assam. Moreover, with a view to promote tourism in the district as well as to showcase the Lungzubels to the world, Lungzubel festival was also organised by the Biate Cultural Organisation (BCO) of Assam, in collaboration with 22 Sector Assam Rifles, State Tourism Department and Archaeological Department and a Haflong-based NGO named Make a Difference (MaD) Society, on September 16, 2015, at Khobak where thousands of people from all spheres attended the day-long programme that included a pipe band display by the Assam Rifles and traditional dances performed by the local villagers belonging to the Biate community. The steps taken by the Assam Government has been commendable and the Lungzubels are now well looked after. Moreover, in the Assam Budget 2019–20, the Lungzubels at Khobak have been included in the list of eight important tourist/historical places of Dima Hasao district which will receive infrastructure upgradation grant as part of the "Asom Darshan" scheme launched by the Government of Assam as a tourism development initiative. This will go a long way in preserving and promoting the relics as well as in developing the areas around it. In the neighboring Meghalaya state, however, no concrete steps have been taken by the Government of Meghalaya to preserve the Lungzubels found in East Jaintia Hills district as of yet. They continue to be in a state of neglect.

== Connectivity ==
Khobak is well connected by an all weather motorable road and one can visit the place at any time of the year. It is located about 130 km from Haflong.
