= Biate =

Biate may refer to:

- Biate people, an ethnic group of Northeast India
- Biate language, a Sino-Tibetan language of India
- Biate (town), a town in Mizoram, India

== See also ==
- Beate
