= Fiangpui =

- Uptown
- Location within Assam Location within India
- Coordinates: 25.1021°N 93.011°E
- Country: India
- State: Assam
- District: Dima Hasao
- Fiangpui: 1949

Government
  - Body: Fiangpui Village Committee
  - Village Head: Shri Lallupuia Nampui
- Elevation: 966.216 m (3,170.00 ft)

Population (2011)
  - Total: 2,051

Languages
  - Local: Biate
- Time zone: UTC+5:30 (IST)
- PIN: 788819
- Telephone code: 03673
- ISO 3166 code: IN-AS
- Vehicle registration: AS
- Lok Sabha constituency: Autonomous District
- Vidhan Sabha constituency: Haflong(ST)
- Autonomous Council constituency: 1-Haflong

Fiangpui is a locality in Haflong town, the headquarters of Dima Hasao district, in Assam, India. With a population of 2051 people as of 2011, it is home to the Biate people. Located at a distance of 2 km from the main town area, one can experience the feeling of a blend of both village and urban lives in Fiangpui.

== Etymology ==
The name Fiangpui is a portmanteau of two Biate words, " Fiang" meaning a small rivulet and " Pui" denoting many or great. Thus, the word Fiangpui literally means a place where many rivulets flows.

== History ==
Fiangpui was established in the year 1936, but was accorded recognition years later in 1955.

== Demographics ==
Majority of the inhabitants belongs to the Biate tribe who constitute one of the many ethnic tribal groups of Assam.

The primary language spoken in Fiangpui is Biate. For communicating with others Haflong Hindi or English is used. Some of the inhabitants also speak Assamese very well.

As of 2011, Fiangpui had a population of 2051 people. Male constitute 49% and female 51% of the population.

== Religion ==
The majority, about 99% of the population are Protestant Christians. Fiangpui is the headquarters of the Biateram Presbyterian Church Synod, one of the Synods under the Presbyterian Church of India.

Religion in Fiangpui
1. Christianity (99.0%)
2. Others (1.00%)

== Education ==
The literacy rate of Fiangpui is 92.08%, higher than the national average of 74.04% as per the census of 2011.

Educational institutions found in Fiangpui are:

- Fiangpui High School
- Fiangpui ME School
- Fiangpui LP School
- Jamchonga Nampui Memorial L.P. School
- Greenwood English School.

While Greenwood English School is an unaided coeducational private school established by Lianthanga Darnei(founder Principal) in 2002, the other four comes under the Department of Education, N.C. Hills.

== Visitor attractions ==
Places of attractions include :

Fiangpui Garden : It is located on the outskirts of Fiangpui.It is frequented by many visitors.

Fiangpui Presbyterian Church : Another major attraction is the beautiful Church that stand tall atop a hill overlooking the village. Since its inception from 27 February 1966 when the first Church building foundation was laid, the present Church building is the fourth with its foundation being laid on 1 November 2004. It was consecrated on 3 March 2011.

Fiangpui Church is the largest church in Dima Hasao district, both in size and number of members. The Church is 107 ft long and 67 ft wide. The height is 18 ft(highest point 45 ft).

Famous for its beautiful structure and supplemented by its picturesque location, the Church gets many visitors everyday, both local and as well as from outside the district.
