= Mormo olivescaria =

Scientific classification
- Kingdom: Animalia
- Phylum: Arthropoda
- Class: Insecta
- Order: Lepidoptera
- Superfamily: Noctuoidea
- Family: Noctuidae
- Genus: Mormo
- Species: M. olivescaria

Binomial name
- Mormo olivescaria (Swinhoe, 1897)

Synonyms
- Ancara olivescaria Swinhoe, 1897

Species of moth

Mormo olivescaria is a moth of the family Noctuidae. It is found in the Jaintia hills in the Meghalaya state of India.
