= Saipung =

- Village
- Location within Meghalaya Location within India
- Coordinates: 25.3154°N 92.6674°E
- Country: India
- State: Meghalaya
- District: East Jaintia Hills

Government
  - Body: Saipung Village Committee
  - Village Head: Shri Priceless Darnei

Population (2011)
  - Total: 1,431

Languages
  - Official: English, Biate
- Time zone: UTC+5:30 (IST)
- PIN: 793200
- Telephone code: 03673
- ISO 3166 code: IN-ML
- Vehicle registration: ML
- Sex ratio: 958 ♂/♀^{2011 Census}
- Literacy: 92.30%^{2011 Census}

Saipung is a village in East Jaintia Hills district, Meghalaya, India. It is the headquarters of the Saipung Sub-Division. The population was 1,431 as per the 2011 Indian census. Located about 136 km from the state's capital Shillong, Saipung is inhabited by the Biate people.

== Demographics ==
The inhabitants are Biates, one of the indigenous ethnic tribes of Meghalaya.

As per the Indian 2011 census, the Saipung village had a population of 1431 of which 731 are males while 700 are females. 20.13% of the total population was under 6 years of age. Saipung has a higher literacy rate compared to Meghalaya. In 2011, literacy rate of Saipung village was 92.30% compared to 74.43% of Meghalaya. Male literacy stands at 95.01% while female literacy rate was 89.50%.

The primary language spoken in Saipung is Biate. For interacting with outsiders, English or Khasi is used.

The dominant religion in Saipung is Christianity followed by almost all the inhabitants.

== Education ==
Educational Institutions in Saipung are:

- Tuinar LP School
- Saipung West Govt LP School
- Saipung East Govt LP School
- Prudence English School
- Thanga Darnei Memorial School
- Saipung Secondary School
- RMSA High School
- Tuinar UP School
- Albert UP English School Private.
- Greenhill UP School
