= 2018 Meghalaya mining accident =

Mining disaster

- Date: December 13, 2018 – March 2, 2019
- Location: Meghalaya, India; 25.5602913°N 92.1936813°E
- Outcome: 5 escaped, 2 confirmed deaths, 13 missing

On 13 December 2018, 15 miners were trapped in a coal mine in Ksan in the Indian state of Meghalaya. After manually digging using a banned process known as rat-hole mining, the miners were trapped inside the mine at a depth of around 110 metres (370 feet) in Jaintia Hills district. The tunnel the miners were in flooded with water after they cut into an adjacent mine full of water from the nearby Lytein river. Five miners managed to escape and rescue efforts for the remaining ten continued until 2 March 2019.

Service personnel from the National Disaster Response Force (NDRF) and the State Disaster Response Force began operations shortly after the miners were trapped. After a request for assistance from the district administration, teams from Coal India, Kirloskar Brothers, the Indian Air Force and the Indian Navy joined the operation to rescue the miners.

== Background ==
In 2014, Meghalaya's yearly coal mining production was around 6 million tonnes. In 2014, the National Green Tribunal (NGT), a government body that handles environmental issues in India, issued an order banning mining in Meghalaya, specifically banning the manual rat-hole mining technique.

Despite the ban, in subsequent orders following petitions by coal mine owners, the NGT and the Supreme Court of India continued to allow transportation of coal dug prior to the enactment of the order on 17 April 2014. On 4 December 2018 the Supreme Court again issued an order that the transportation of coal mined prior to the ban was extended to 31 January 2019. However, both the NGT and anti-mining activists have pointed out that illegal mining of fresh coal still continues. In November 2018, two activists were attacked for gathering evidence of illegal coal mining in the area.

== Overview ==
After manually digging for coal using the rat-hole process, 15 miners were trapped inside the mine at a depth of around 110 metres (370 feet) in Jaintia Hills district. The tunnel the miners were in flooded with water after they cut into an adjacent mine, which was full of water from the nearby Lytein river. Five miners managed to escape and rescue efforts for the remaining ten continued until 2 March 2019.

=== Rescue attempts ===
Rescue operations started on 13 December. Over 100 service personnel from the National Disaster Response Force (NDRF) and State Disaster Response Force were deployed to rescue the miners. 1,200,000 litres (260,000 imp gal; 320,000 US gal) were pumped out of the mine, but rain and water from the river continued to flood the mine. Divers were also sent into the mine, but could only reach a depth of 12 metres (40 feet). Sonar systems as well as cameras failed to detect the miners.

The local administration made a request for pumps and other assistance from state owned Coal India on 20 December 2018. The communication was received by Coal India only on 26 December. On 28 December the Indian Air Force joined in the operations on 28 December 2018, airlifting pumps to the site. Teams from Coal India and Kirloskar Brothers also provided expertise. On 29 December, a 15-member diving team from the Indian Navy also joined in the operation.

Media reports appeared on 27 December that the miners may be dead on the basis of a statement by a diver of the NDRF, which mentioned the presence of a "foul smell" coming from the mine. The NDRF shortly after clarified that this did not mean the miners were dead, and the foul smell could be coming due to other reasons, such as "stagnated water".

After a petition was filed in the Supreme Court of India, the solicitor general, Tushar Mehta, informed the court that the rescue efforts were facing additional difficulty because there were no blueprints for the 355-ft mine where the miners were trapped. Water flowing into the mine from the nearby river was also making the operation more difficult.

The Indian Army and Navy decided to cease operations on 2 March 2019. The operation, one of the longest efforts to rescue miners in India, only found two decomposed bodies, which were handed over to family members.

== Reactions ==
The Chief Minister of Meghalaya, Conrad Sangma, has called for regulation of mining in the state, admitting that illegal mining happens there. Meghalaya Police arrested the owner of the coal mine on 15 December 2018. Congress leader Rahul Gandhi criticised the Narendra Modi government over the issue.

After a petition was filed in the Supreme Court of India related to the rescue effort, the Supreme Court stated on 3 January 2019:

We're not satisfied with rescue operations. No matter whether they are all dead, some alive, few dead or all alive, they should be taken out. We pray to God they are alive.

— Supreme Court of India, 3 Jan 2019

== See also ==
- Chasnala mining disaster
- Mining accident
- Rajpura Dariba Mine VRM disaster
