= Transport in Thanjavur =

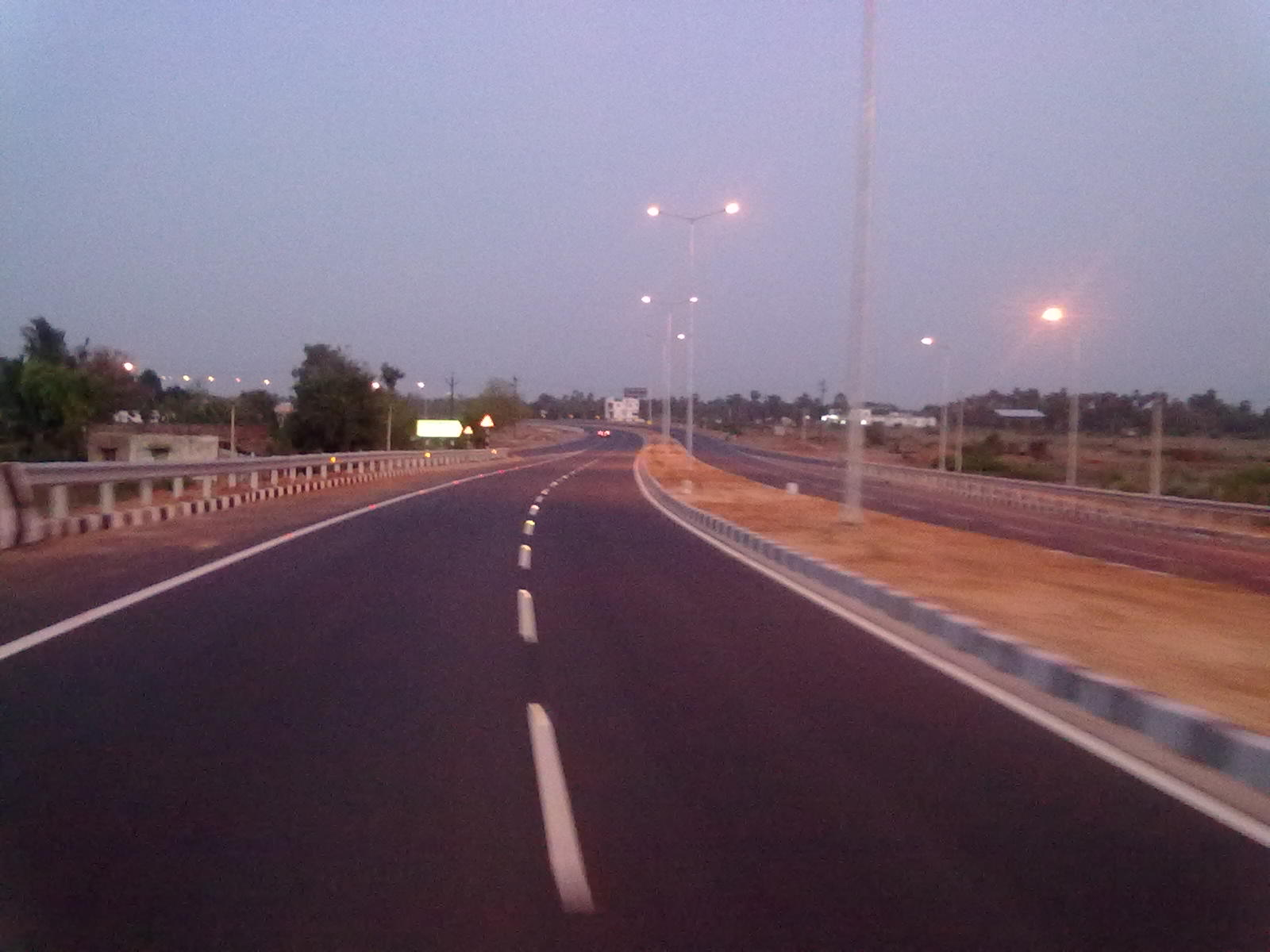
NH 67 in Thanjavur

Thanjavur has a well-developed transport infrastructure. Thanjavur is well connected by Road, and Rail with most cities and towns in India

== Road ==
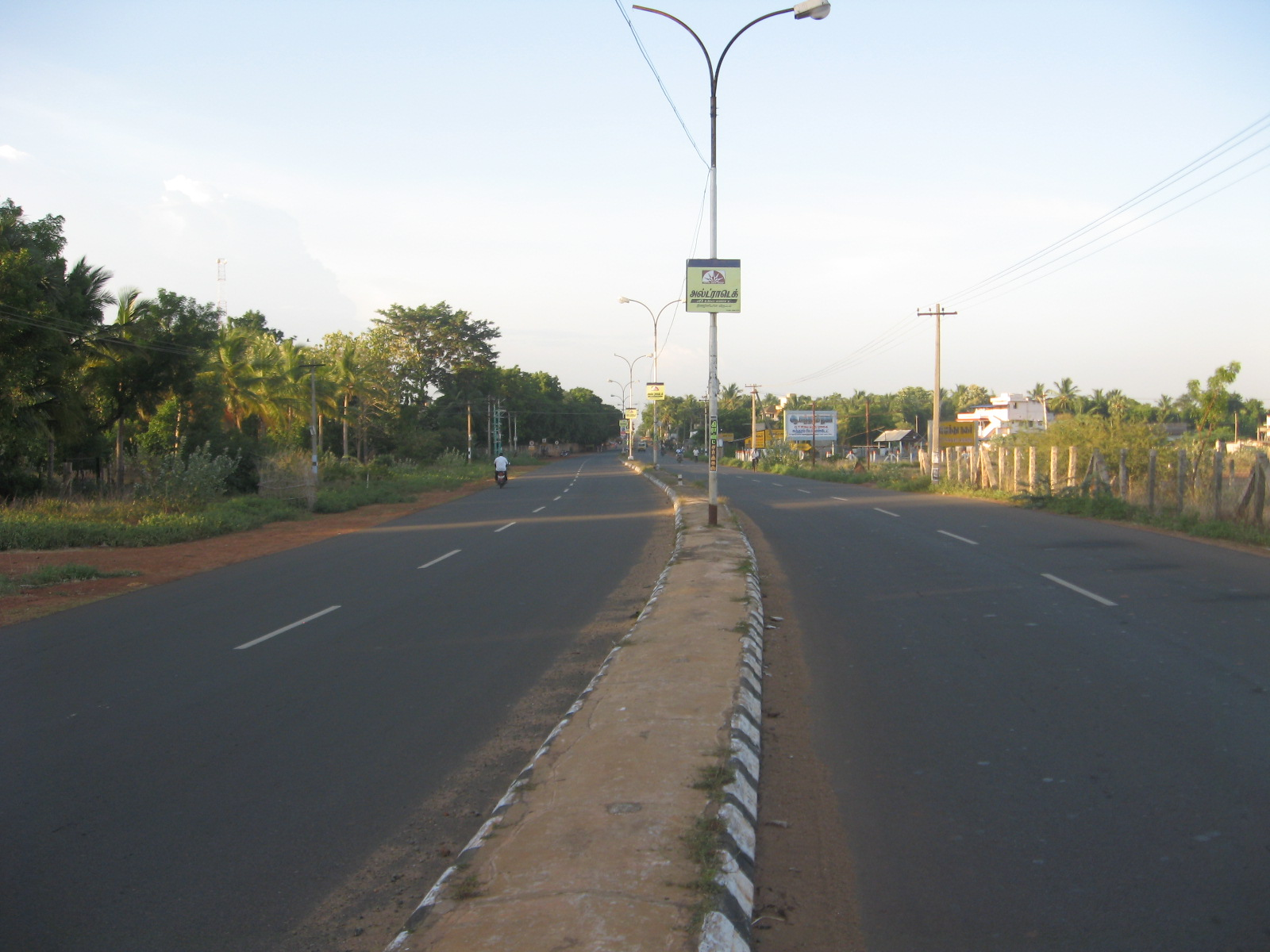
Pudukkottai Road in Thanjavur City

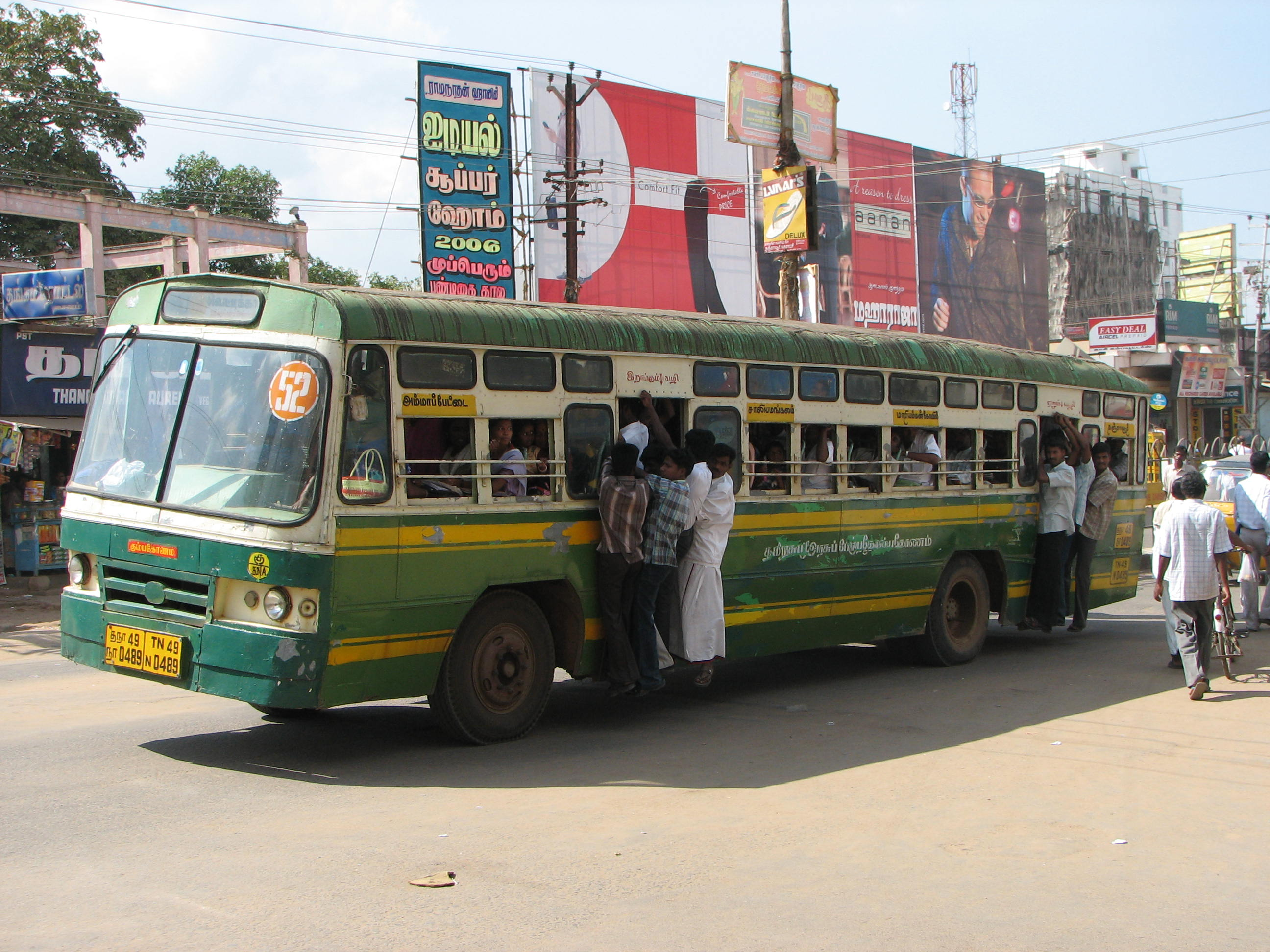
Crowded bus in Thanjavur city

Thanjavur is well-connected with Chennai, Coimbatore, Tiruchirapalli, Karaikal, Pudukkottai, Madurai, Tirunelveli, Kumbakonam, Nagapattinam, Pattukkottai, Bengaluru, Ernakulam, Marthandam, Nagercoil, Tirupathi, Trivandrum, Ooty and Mysuru through regular bus services. Previously, Thanjavur had a single bus terminus located at the heart of the city. However, recently a new bus terminus has been constructed outside the city limits and a Proposed New Terminus near Palliagraharam in Thanjavur - Kumbakonam Road in order to handle the passenger traffic. Thanjavur also has a well-maintained domestic public transport system. Government and private buses operate frequently between Old Bus Stand and New Bus Stand and between Old Bus Stand and outlying towns as Vallam and Budalur and villages as Pillaiyarpatti, Vallam Pudursethi, Sengipatti and Kuruvadipatti. There are also minibus services between Old Bus Stand and Reddipalayam and share auto services along the Thanjavur-Trichy national highway.

=== National Highways ===
National highways

- NH-67: Nagapattinam - Tiruvarur - Thanjavur - Tiruchirappalli - Karur - Coimbatore - Ooty - Intersection of NH-212 in Karnataka
- NH-45C: Thanjavur - Kumbakonam - Neyveli - Panruti - Vikkravandi NH-45
- NH-226: Thanjavur - Pudukottai - Tirupattur - Sivagangai - Manamadurai
- NH-226 Extn: Thanjavur - Ariyalur - Perambalur NH-45

=== Bus Stands ===
There are four bus stands in Thanjavur city. They are,

- New Bus Stand (near Raja Serfoji College).
- Old Bus Stand (near Anna Statue).
- Thiruvaiyaru Bus Stand(near Thanjavur Old bus stand )
- SETC Bus Stand(near Thanjavur Old Bus Stand)

== Rail ==
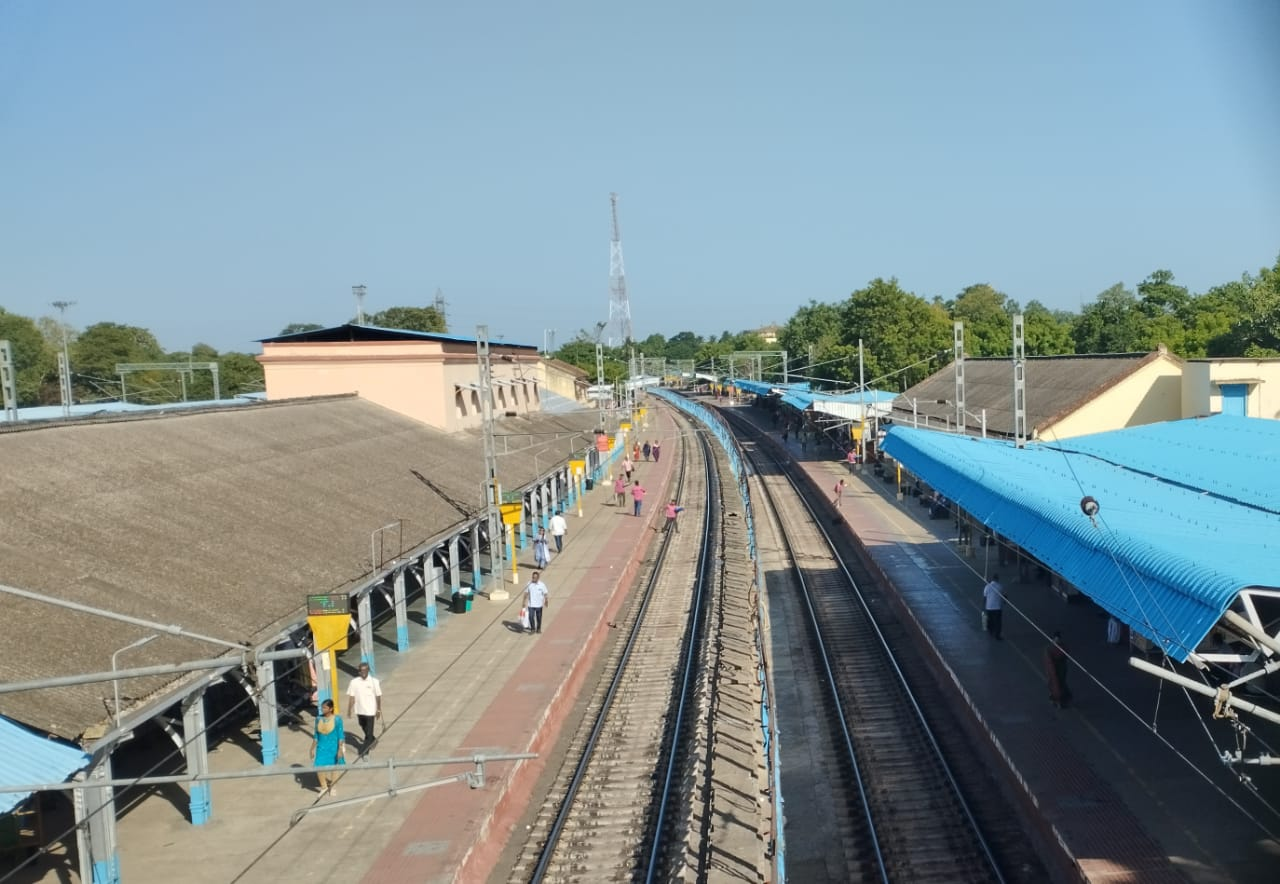
Thanjavur junction railway Station

Thanjavur Junction railway station (Code : TJ) is an important railway junction of Southern Railways. Thanjavur is connected by rail with most important cities and towns in India. This district has 122.07 Kilometers of Broad gauge railway lines with 20 Railway stations connecting Thanjavur to major centres in the state. Thanjavur is also reachable by train from other Indian cities. 'Thanjavur Junction' is the station to alight. There are daily express trains to Chennai, Mysuru, Ernakulam, Thrissur, Palakkad, Coimbatore, Erode, Tiruppur, Tiruchchirapalli, Hosur, Salem, Karur, Madurai, Tirunelveli, Rameswaram, Tiruchendur, Cuddalore, Chidambaram, Dharmapuri, Villupuram, Chengalpattu, Mannargudi, Bengaluru, Dindigul, Pudukkottai, Karaikudi, Sivaganga, Manamadurai and weekly trains to Tirupati, Nellore, Itarsi, Visakhapatnam, Hubli, Vasco da Gama (Goa), Vijayawada, Nagpur, Jabalpur, Satna, Katni, Allahabad, Ayodhya, Faizabad, Varanasi and Bhubaneswar. There are frequent passenger trains from the city to towns like Thiruvarur, Nagapattinam, Karaikal, Tiruchirapalli, Kumbakonam, Mayiladuthurai and Nagore. For train timings and on-line reservations (within India) visit the IRCTC's website.

== Air ==
In the early 1990s, Thanjavur was connected with Chennai via the Vayudoot flight service, which was stopped due to poor patronage. A full fledged Air Force Station is operational at Thanjavur which stations several Fighter (aircraft) including Sukhoi jets. The Air Force Station is set to start function as a major Air base. The nearest International Airport is the Tiruchirapalli International Airport which is about 50 km from the city.

== See also ==
- Thanjavur Air Force Station
- Transport in Tamil Nadu
- Transport in Tiruchirappalli
- Transport in Chennai
- Transport in Coimbatore
- Tiruchirapalli Airport
- Thanjavur
