= Jamchonga Nampui =

Indian civil servant

Personal details
- Born: 2 June 1926 Thuruk, Assam Province
- Died: 24 November 1988 (aged 62) Shillong, Meghalaya
- Resting place: All Saints Church Cemetery, Shillong
- Spouse: Minne.E.Nampui (nee Majaw)
- Education: St. Anthony's College, Shillong
- Occupation: Civil Servant

Jamchonga Nampui (Nampui Jam Chonga) was an Indian civil servant. He was an Indian Administrative Service officer of Assam-Meghalaya cadre. He was the first person from Assam to be directly recruited to the IAS as well as the first Scheduled Tribe IAS officer in India when he cleared the civil services examination conducted by the Union Public Service Commission in 1954. He belongs to the Biate tribe of Northeast India.

== Early life and education ==
Jamchonga Nampui (2 June 1926 – 24 November 1988) was born in Thuruk, a medium size Biate village in present-day Dima Hasao District of Assam which then a part of Assam Province, to Somlalkhupa and Roichongbuangi Nampui. Jamchonga was the eldest of seven brothers and two sisters in his family. Two years after his birth, his parents moved to Mualdam, a village in North Cachar Hills (Dima Hasao) where he spent his childhood days.

In 1935, as there was no school in Mualdam his father took him to Haflong where he was enrolled in Haflong Welsh Mission L.P. School (now Government Boys Higher Secondary School) in the same year. From his school years, Jamchonga was a bright and hardworking student who had a strong desire to learn. In 1942, after passing Middle Class (Class VI), he was sent for further studies to Shillong (the then capital of Assam) as Haflong during those days didn't have any school that provided higher studies beyond Class VI. In Shillong, he got admitted to the Government High School, Mawkhar. During this period, particularly during 1945–46, young Jamchonga was actively involved in freedom movement activities against the British Raj, at a time when the demand for freedom was at its greatest strength in the country. This zeal, however, affected his studies and as a result, he could not clear his matriculation examination in 1946. Jamchonga returned to Haflong in 1946 where he stayed till 1950 doing several jobs to earn a living. Although he was now earning, his love for education and learning didn't die. So he decided to give the matriculation examination again in 1950 from Government English High School (now Government Boys Higher Secondary School) and this time he passed the exam with a first division. He then moved to Shillong again and took admission in St. Anthony's College. During this period, he used to work as a clerk in the Governor's Secretariat (during the tenure of Jairamdas Daulatram) during the day and attend night classes. In spite of many odds, he passed his Bachelor of Arts (BA) with distinction from St. Anthony's College securing the overall rank of 8th position under Gauhati University in 1954. After his graduation, he decided to sit for the civil services examination and in his very first attempt cleared the examination securing a merit ranking of 64th position and was selected for the Indian Administrative Service (IAS).

== Career ==
Jamchonga Nampui first posting as a civil servant was as assistant commissioner, Naga Hills of undivided Assam on 2 May 1956 on probation. In a career spanning 32 years, he went on to serve as assistant commissioner, Lakhimpur and Sivasagar districts, deputy commissioner of Mizo Hills district (now Mizoram) and Cachar district (w.e.f. 20.10.1960 - 20.12.1960 and then again from 05.10.1961 to 30.09.1964) and also as commissioner, transport and commissioner, excise, Assam. He then went on to become chairman, M.S.E.B, Meghalaya, joint secretary, Revenue and Forest Department, Assam and subsequently Secretary to the Government of India, Information & Broadcasting, New Delhi. He was appointed twice as the chief secretary of Meghalaya in 1980 (13.05.1980 - 26.08.1983) and then again in 1985 (1.07.1985 - 16.02.1986). After this, Jamchonga was then appointed as the chief secretary of Assam (14.02.1986 - 01.11.1986), a post he held till his retirement. He retired on 1 November 1986. He was, however, appointed again as honorarium in vice chairman, State Hills Areas Planning Board with the status of minister of state for a brief period after his retirement by the Government of Assam.

== Death ==
Shortly after he retired from service, Jamchonga Nampui died on 24 November 1988 at his residence 'Ivory Cottage' in Mawkhar, Shillong. He was buried at the Church of North India cemetery, Laban.

== Personal life ==
Jamchonga was the eldest of seven brothers and two sisters born to Somlalkhupa and Roichongbuangi Nampui. Other notable siblings include Luaia Nampui, a retired Indian Revenue Service (IRS) officer who now resides in Guwahati.

Jamchonga Nampui married Minnie Elizabeth Nampui (Majaw) in 1954. They have two sons, Earle David and Michael Andrew and three daughters, Jennie Evangeline, Nora Elizabeth and Merilyn Nellie. His daughter, Merilyn Nellie Nampui also went on to become an IAS officer.

His grandson Nathaniel Donbor Nampui Majaw, son of Jennie Evangeline, is an assistant professor at Jamchonga's alma mater, St. Anthony's College.

== Commemoration ==
To honour Jamchonga Nampui and to take forward his legacy "to strive for the best in education", a school in Fiangpui, Assam, District Council L.P. School, established in 1962, was renamed as J.C. Nampui Memorial L.P. School in 1990 after him.
