= Mookhep =

Mookhep village is located in Khliehriat Tehsil of East Jaintia Hills district in Meghalaya in India.
