= Rat-hole mining =

Manual coal extraction technique

Rat-hole mining or rat mining is a process of digging employed in North East India to extract coal, where a narrow hole is manually dug by extraction workers. The practice is banned by the National Green Tribunal; however, the technique is still employed by artisanal mining operations in several parts of India, especially in Meghalaya.

== Technique ==
Rat-hole mining is a technique of digging manually wherein the worker involved in extraction can hardly crawl in and out, as a narrow tunnel is dug 0.9 to 1.2 metres (3 to 4 ft) deep. This technique is of two basic types:

- The side-cutting method is generally used on hill slopes by navigating through coal seams deposited on the rock layers and visible on the outer surface of rock and generally in darkish brown or black banded.
- The box-cutting method involves digging a narrow pit up to 120 m (400 ft) deep. The method is used in North Eastern India to extract coal.

== Bans ==
As rat-hole mining involves working in dangerous conditions, causing environmental damage, and causes many accidents involving death and injuries, the technique is criticised and banned in many countries. Rat-hole mining is banned in India by National Green Tribunal.

== Notable incidents ==
=== 2018 Meghalaya accident ===

The Meghalaya mining accident happened on 13 December 2018, when 15 miners were trapped in a mine in Ksan, in the Indian state of Meghalaya. While five miners managed to escape, rescue efforts for the remaining 10 continued till 2 March 2019. After manually digging using a banned process known as rat-hole mining, the miners were trapped inside the coal mine at a depth of around 370 feet (110 meters) in Jaintia Hills district. The tunnel the miners were in flooded with water after they cut into an adjacent mine which was full of water from the nearby Lytein river.

Service personnel from the National Disaster Response Force (NDRF) and the State Disaster Response Force began operations shortly after the miners were trapped. After a request for assistance from the district administration, teams from Coal India, Kirloskar Brothers, the Indian Air Force and the Indian Navy joined the operation to rescue the miners.

=== 2021 incident near Rymbai ===
On 21 January 2021 six miners died in an incident in a mineshaft in an area of rat-hole mines in the East Jaintia Hills district of Meghalaya.

=== Uttarakhand rescue ===
In late 2023, rat-hole miners were instrumental in the rescue of 41 workers who were trapped for 17 days after the road tunnel in Uttarakhand that they were digging collapsed.

=== 2025 Assam incident ===
In January 2025, miners became trapped underground in an illegal rat-hole mine in the Dima Hasao district of Assam, which resulted in at least 9 confirmed deaths.
