= Uttarakhand tunnel rescue =

Tunnel collapse and rescue in India

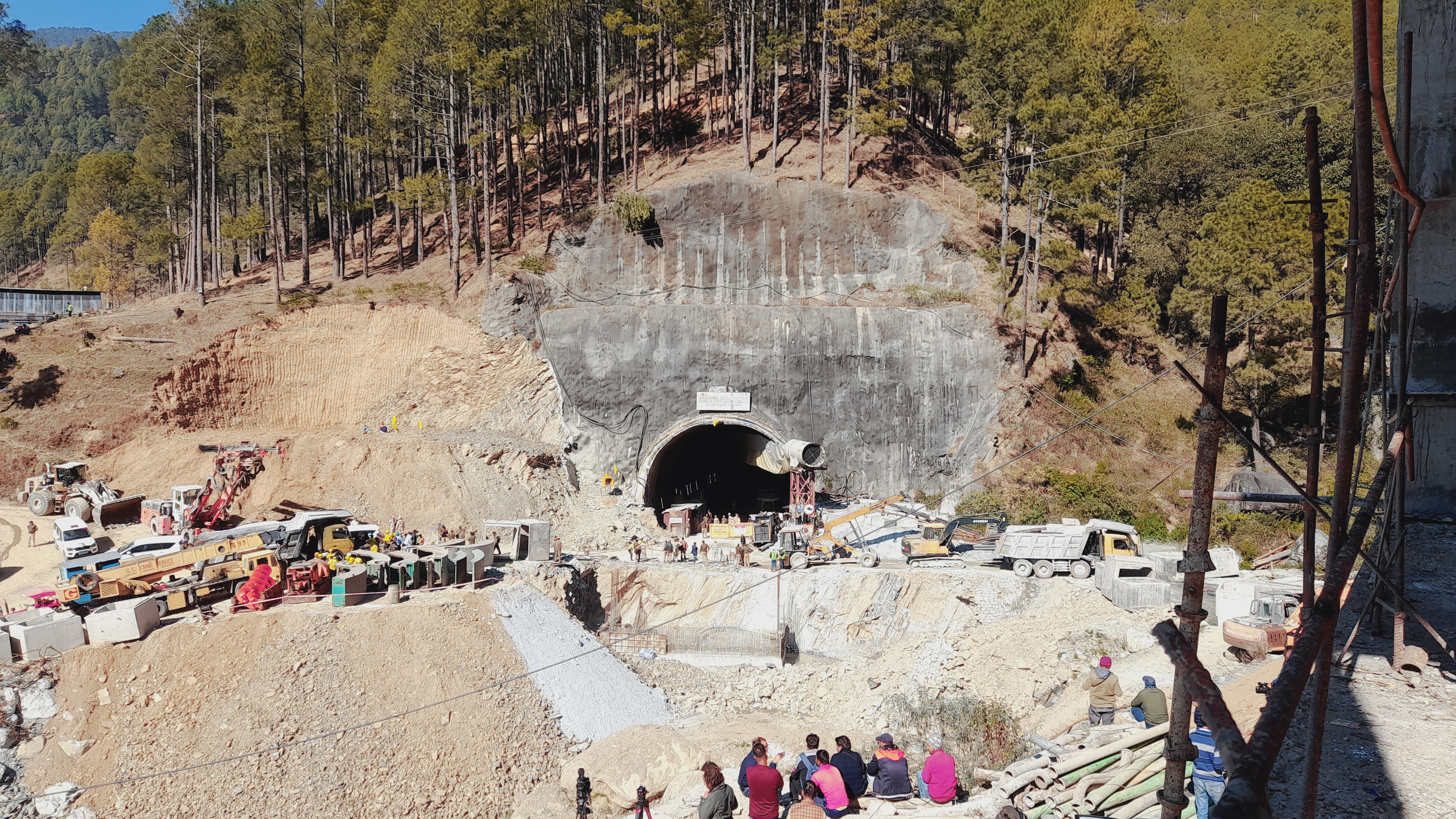
- Date: 12–28 November 2023; (16 days)
- Time: 05:30 IST
- Location: Silkyara Bend–Barkot tunnel, Uttarkashi, Uttarakhand, India; 30°45′26.9″N 78°15′48.8″E
- Cause: Tunnel collapse
- Outcome: All 41 trapped workers rescued

On 12 November 2023, a section of the Silkyara Bend–Barkot tunnel, planned to connect National Highway 134 in the Uttarkashi district of Uttarakhand, India, caved in during construction. The collapse occurred at around 05:30 IST and trapped 41 workers inside the tunnel.

Rescue operations were immediately launched, with a number of government agencies involved, including the National Disaster Response Force, the State Disaster Response Force, Uttarakhand Police, engineers from the Indian Army Corps of Engineers, and Project Shivalik of the Border Roads Organisation. Numerous private resources were utilized in the rescue efforts as well, including Australian tunnelling experts Arnold Dix and Chris Cooper.

Though the initial attempts at a rescue were complicated because of the kinds of debris created in the collapse, the government brought in "rat-hole" miners who were able to use manual mining methods to get an access pipe to the trapped workers. All 41 workers were rescued, and the collapse triggered a safety audit of other tunnels in the area.

== Background ==
The Silkyara Bend–Barkot tunnel was being constructed by contentious Navayuga Engineering Construction Limited (NECL) under National Highways and Infrastructure Development Corporation Limited (NHIDCL) as part of the Char Dham project, intended to connect important Hindu pilgrim sites in Uttarakhand, North India, with two-lane, all-weather paved roads. The tunnel was located on the Yamunotri end of National Highway 134, which is planned to connect Dharasu on the south end to Yamunotri on the north end. The tunnel is planned to be 4.5 kilometres (2.8 mi) long and will shorten the route by about 20 kilometres (12 mi).

The initial tender for the development project did not anticipate the complexity of building tunnels in this specific geography. Because the Himalayas are a very young mountain formation, and this particular section of the Himalayas has a mix of different rock types with different levels of strength, the construction has encountered multiple collapses and other faults. Landslides have also been increasing in recent decades as construction increases, and this is expected to get more complicated as climate change increases the intensity of rain and glacial melt flooding events.

== Collapse ==
At approximately 5:30 12 November 2023, whilst under construction, a section of the Silkyara Bend–Barkot tunnel collapsed, trapping 41 construction workers inside, who were reprofiling 260m to 265m inside the tunnel from Silkyara portal. The 60 meter-long blockage occurred from a point about 200 metres (660 ft) from the entrance of the tunnel inwards. A team of geologists from the state government of Uttarakhand and educational institutions was sent to the location to determine the cause of the incident. According to investigators, the tunnel had no escape shafts for evacuation in an emergency and was built along a line which crosses a geological fault.

The tunnel's location is in proximity to the main central thrust of the Himalayas which is a major geological fault and is generally accepted to be a shear zone. The Border Roads Organisation said in a statement that the tunnel was being constructed in an extremely weak rock mass constituting meta-siltstone and phyllites.

== Rescue efforts ==
The state government launched Operation Zindagi ("life") to save the trapped workers. On 16 November, another horizontal drilling machine with an auger bit (to install an 800mm escape pipe) was disassembled and flown from Delhi in three parts after the progress of the first machine was insufficiently speedy. The rescue team had contacted the team that freed the students from the 2018 Tham Luang cave disaster in Thailand.

Drilling through the debris in the tunnel was stopped on 17 November after cracking sounds were heard. Alternative access tunnels had been started parallel and adjacent to the existing main tunnel. Three pipes were drilled during the operation, one providing oxygen, one providing passage for food, and a 15-centimetre-wide (6 in) pipe that was used to supply hot meals and allow the insertion of an endoscopic camera. On 19 November, the Border Roads Organisation constructed a 1.15 kilometres (0.71 mi) road to a location on a hillock above the tunnel as plans for drilling a vertical shaft to enable a rescue were being made.

Problems with the consistency of the rubble and with obstructions caused drilling delays on 22 and 23 November, with significant repairs required to the drilling machine and its mounting platform on 23 November; at this stage, it was believed that the operations had reached 75% of the way through the obstructing debris. On 25 November, the rescue operation faced another setback as the tunnel drilling machine broke and became stuck inside the tunnel after successfully drilling 47 metres (154 ft), hampering the drilling's progress. The rescue team decided to use manual tools such as hammers and chisels to break the debris and reach the trapped workers. It was believed that the drilling had reached a point approximately 9 metres (30 ft) short of breaking through. Meanwhile, Australian tunnelling expert Arnold Dix, who was part of the rescue operation, informed them that they needed to approach cautiously. Dix was called upon by the Indian government to serve as a consultant and spent many days and nights alongside rescue teams outside the tunnel.

On 27 November, alternate methods to gain access to the workers were intensified. Vertical drilling by Satluj Jal Vidyut Nigam at the Silkyara end reached a depth of 32 metres (105 ft) and a third pipeline for the supply of necessities to the workers was also being laid by Rail Vikas Nigam. On the Barkot end of the tunnel, THDC India Limited had executed a successful drill up to 12 metres (39 ft) while Oil and Natural Gas Corporation was preparing for vertical drilling.

On 28 November, "rat-hole" miners in the rescue team broke through the remaining length of debris and pushed a pipe to the trapped workers manually. The rescue team evacuated the workers one-by-one on stretchers, throughout the day, in a process that was expected to take several hours.

Later at around 20:50 IST on the same day, it was confirmed by the Government of Uttarakhand that all 41 workers had been successfully rescued. The chief minister of Uttarakhand Pushkar Singh Dhami and Minister of State of Road Transport and Highways V. K. Singh were present at the site welcoming the rescued workers.

The rescued workers were reported to be in good health, and they were taken to a medical facility in Chinyalisaur for initial assessment. Forty-one ambulances were arranged for the individuals.

On 29 November, the 41 rescued workers were airlifted to AIIMS Rishikesh aboard an Indian Air Force CH-47 Chinook helicopter for further assessment. Following a medical examination, 40 of those workers were declared fit and cleared to return home as of 1 December.

== Investigation ==
The government of Uttarakhand has formed a six-member expert committee to investigate the cause of the tunnel collapse. The committee is being led by the director of the Uttarakhand Landslide Mitigation and Management Centre.

On 22 November, the National Highways Authority of India said in a statement that it will conduct a safety audit of all the 29 tunnels currently under construction across the country along with a team of tunnelling experts from Delhi Metro Rail Corporation. However, preliminary findings of NHAI indicated the collapse may have been caused by a geological fault, known as a "shear zone".

Although the detailed probe report into the collapse found negligence on the part of NHIDCL, the entity that prepared the Detailed Project Report (DPR), as well as the construction firm and the supervising consultant or authority engineer (AE), the government has yet to take any significant action against these entities. The report highlighted that the alignment fixing did not adhere to the fundamental principles of tunneling, and there was negligence from the contractor in addressing the issues related to 21 minor collapses, even though the AE had flagged them.

== Reaction ==
President Droupadi Murmu and Prime Minister Narendra Modi expressed relief for the successful rescue and wished the workers good health. They also appreciated the efforts of numerous agencies and personnel involved in the rescue operation.

The Australian High Commissioner to India Philip Green and Australian Prime Minister Anthony Albanese congratulated Indian agencies for evacuating the 41 trapped workers. They also commended the efforts made by Dix for providing technical expertise.

== Aftermath ==
On 16 April 2025 multiple media outlets reported that the two ends of Silkyara have met i.e. breakthrough has been achieved. With this breakthrough the excavation work will be completed and the tunnel will be ready for use in the next one year after finishing the remaining works. The restoration of the collapsed section has also been completed.

== See also ==
- 2010 Copiapó mining accident
- Tham Luang cave rescue
- Big Dig ceiling collapse
- Telangana tunnel collapse
