= Chasnala mining disaster =

1975 coal mine explosion in Jharkhand, India

- Date: 27 December 1975
- Location: Dhanbad, Bihar (now Jharkhand)
- Cause: Water from adjacent mine gushed after the wall in between collapsed
- Deaths: 375
- Convicted: 2 (in 2012)
- Charges: Rs. 5000
- Verdict: 1 year imprisonment and Rs. 5000 fine each

The Chasnala mining disaster was a disaster that happened on 27 December 1975 in a coal mine in Chasnala near Dhanbad in the Indian state of Jharkhand. An explosion in the mine followed by flooding killed 375 miners.

== Accident ==
The disaster was caused by an explosion at 1:35pm that weakened the wall between the mine pit and another, abandoned mine above it that was full of water. By one estimate at the time, around 110 million imperial gallons (500,000 m^{3}) of water flooded in, at a rate of 7 million imperial gallons (32,000 m^{3}) minute. Other reports put the total amount of water at 30 to 50 million imperial gallons (140,000 to 230,000 m^{3}). The miners were killed by debris, drowning, and the force of the flood. By the time bodies could be recovered, they were typically identifiable only by the number on their lamp helmets. The first body was recovered 26 days after the accident occurred.

With a death toll of 375, Chasnala was India's deadliest mining accident.

== Investigation and consequences ==
Although the Indian Iron and Steel Company (IISCO), which owned the mine, said it conformed to international standards, miners blamed management negligence. There was also concern that the barrier between the two mines had been unsafely thin and that there was inadequate safety equipment. In particular, the mine had no high pressure pump. Instead, pumps had to be brought in from the Soviet Union and Poland to try to remove the water.

Ujjal Narayan Sinha, the former Chief Justice of the Patna High Court, was appointed to investigate the circumstances of the disaster. He submitted his report on 24 March 1977. Consequently, four IISCO officials were prosecuted for negligence. By the time the case was decided in 2012 (37 years later), two of them had died. The surviving officials, manager Ramanuj Bhattacharya and agent, planning and group security officer Dipak Sarkar, were each sentenced to one year's imprisonment and a fine of ₹5,000. They were released on bail and had a month to appeal.

A memorial to the dead (Shaheed Smarak) was built outside the mine entrance and moved to a park in 1997.

== In popular culture ==
The film Kaala Patthar depicts the tragedy.

== See also ==
- 2018 Meghalaya mining accident
