= Mormo venata =

Scientific classification
- Kingdom: Animalia
- Phylum: Arthropoda
- Class: Insecta
- Order: Lepidoptera
- Superfamily: Noctuoidea
- Family: Noctuidae
- Genus: Mormo
- Species: M. venata

Binomial name
- Mormo venata (Hampson, 1908)

Synonyms
- Mania venata Hampson, 1908

Species of moth

Mormo venata is a moth of the family Noctuidae. It is found in the western parts of China.
