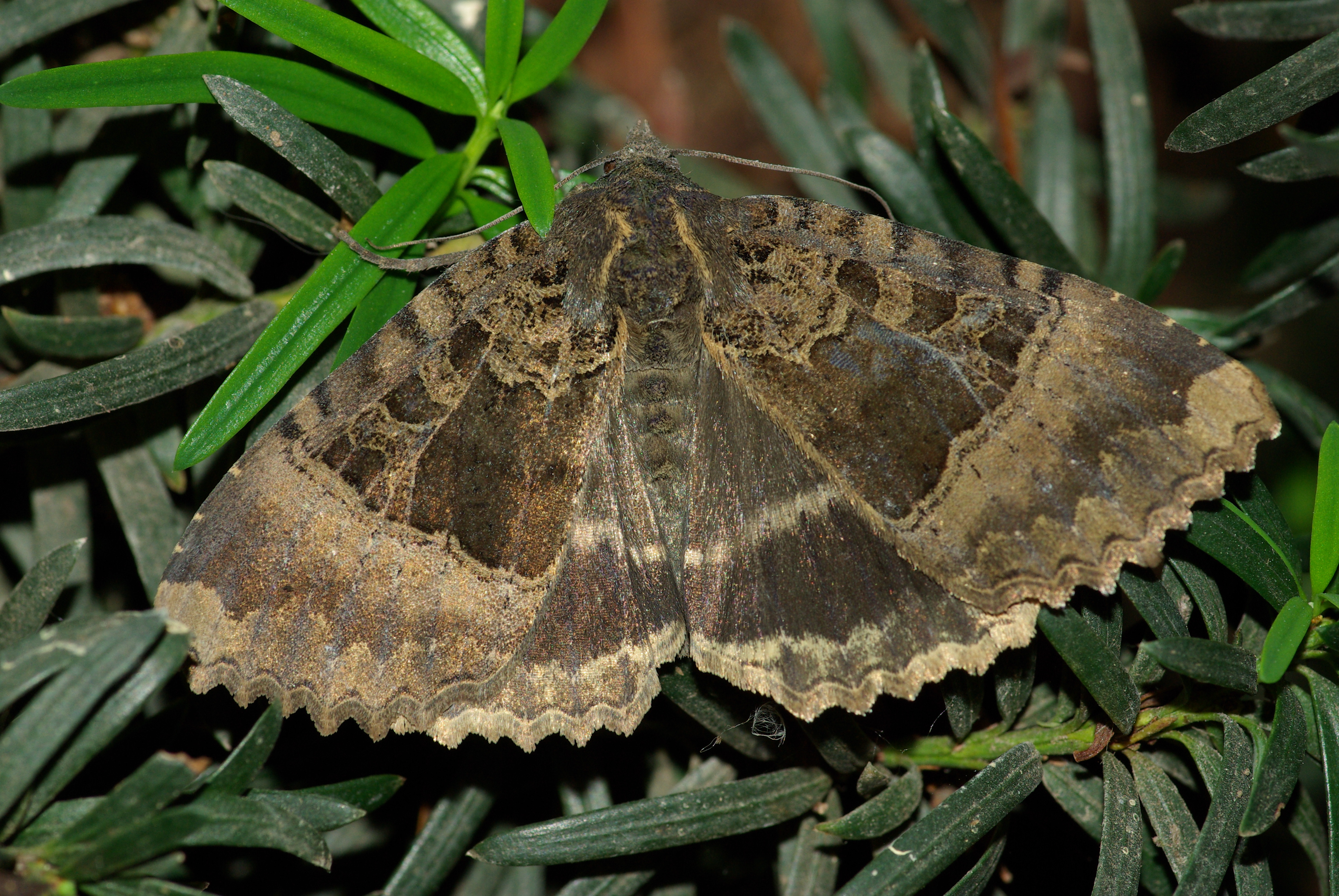
- Mormo maura

Scientific classification
- Domain: Eukaryota
- Kingdom: Animalia
- Phylum: Arthropoda
- Class: Insecta
- Order: Lepidoptera
- Superfamily: Noctuoidea
- Family: Noctuidae
- Subfamily: Xyleninae
- Genus: Mormo; Ochsenheimer, 1816

= Mormo (moth) =

Genus of moths

Mormo is a genus of moths of the family Noctuidae.

== Species ==
- Mormo cyanea Sugi, 1982
- Mormo maura – Old Lady, Black Underwing
- Mormo muscivirens Butler, 1878
- Mormo nyctichroa (Hampson, 1908)
- Mormo olivescaria (Swinhoe, 1897)
- Mormo phaeochroa (Hampson, 1908)
- Mormo venata (Hampson, 1908)
