= Mormo cyanea =

Scientific classification
- Kingdom: Animalia
- Phylum: Arthropoda
- Clade: Pancrustacea
- Class: Insecta
- Order: Lepidoptera
- Superfamily: Noctuoidea
- Family: Noctuidae
- Genus: Mormo
- Species: M. cyanea

Binomial name
- Mormo cyanea Sugi, 1982

Species of moth

Mormo cyanea is a moth of the family Noctuidae. It is found in Japan.
