= Arnold Dix =

Australian scientist

- Born: Monbulk, Victoria, Australia
- Education: Monash University
- Occupations: Geologist, engineer, lawyer
- Spouse: Divina Dix
- Relatives: Helena Dix (sister)
- Awards: NFPA Distinguished Committee Service Award (2022); Monash University 2024 Science Alumni of the Year
- Website: arnolddix.com

Arnold Dix is an Australian geologist, engineer, lawyer, and author. He is known for his part in the Uttarakhand tunnel rescue in India in 2023, and a former president of the International Tunnelling and Underground Space Association.

== Early life and education ==
Arnold Dix was born in Monbulk, Victoria, one of three children: his siblings are opera singer Helena Dix and Colin Dix (deceased).

Arnold attended Haileybury Newlands and then Haileybury Senior School from 1975-1981. He played in School Rugby teams and was a member of the Swimming Squad.

Arnold was a Vice Captain in Berthon House, one of the Haileybury Houses. In the 1980 Yearbook, he wrote a prescient piece on environmental awareness for a body named HEAL (Haileybury Environmental Awareness League).

He earned an honours Bachelor of Science from Monash University, Melbourne, in 1986, followed by a bachelor of laws in 1988.

== Career ==
=== Legal career ===
Dix is a registered barrister at the High Court of Australia and a member of the Victorian Bar. He is a former counsel to White & Case legal firm and a former partner of law firms Maddock Lonie & Chisholm, and DLA Phillips Fox.

=== Academia ===
As of November 2023 Dix was professor of engineering at Tokyo City University. As of November 2025 he is professor of engineering at MIT World Peace University (MIT-WPU), Pune, India. He is a former professor of engineering at Queensland University of Technology and at Western Sydney University.

=== Leadership and other roles ===
Dix is a former president of International Tunnelling and Underground Space Association (ITUSA), based in Geneva, Switzerland. He is also the founder of The ALARP Group.

Dix is a member of the National Fire Protection Association standards committees for Road (NFPA 502) and Rail (NFPA 130) Tunnels safety. He also serves on PIARC for road Tunnel related matters.

In September 2025, the ITA, in cooperation with the International Atomic Energy Agency (IAEA), appointed Dix as inaugural chair of its nuclear waste disposal working group to support UN Member States in developing deep geological repositories for high-level radioactive waste.

=== Safety and rescues ===
In 2023, he was part of the Uttarakhand tunnel rescue operation of 41 workers in India who were trapped in Uttarkashi, India.

Dix has also been involved in improving the safety of bulk milk truck tankers. In 2023, he was announced by the National Bulk Tanker Association (NBTA) as the keynote speaker for Bulk Tanker Day.

In 2020, Dix, together with Lord Robert Mair and Peter Vickery QC, established Underground Works Chambers. The company offers technical and regulatory solutions for challenges related to underground spaces.

==== Uttarakhand tunnel rescue ====
On 19 November 2023, Dix joined the Uttarakhand tunnel rescue operation in Uttarakhand, India. Upon arrival, Dix promised to evacuate all 41 workers safely. Dix played a leading role in the operation that saved 41 workers who were trapped nearly 200 ft below the surface. He worked together with five agencies ONGC, SJVNL, RVNL, NHIDCL, and THDCL, who had encountered difficulties completing the rescue mission.

Dix suggested that the team use soft mining techniques, to avoid disturbing the mountain and causing another avalanche which would put the workers at further risk. Rescuers had been using large earth drilling machines which caused vibrations that made the tunnel more unsafe. The large drills also broke down from hitting metal obstacles from the collapsed tunnel, forcing the rescue operation to be paused frequently. Dix proposed much slower and gentle approaches that he considered safer. The rescuers used a thin pipe to carry the trapped workers to safety. They finally excavated by hand to avoid disturbing the rock and causing further damage.

Dix displayed faith during the rescue by praying at a makeshift temple during the rescue, which gained attention on social media. During the rescue mission, Dix was seen praying at the temple of local deity Baba Bokh Naag ji.

==== 2026 Nepal–Tibet floods ====
In August 2026 Dix has been helping rescuers locate the entrances to hydropower tunnels in which hundreds of workers were trapped in the 2026 Nepal–Tibet floods. The expert in tunnel rescue said that the rescue was something he has never seen and ask no one to judge and advice without understanding Nepal's difficult geography. He openly thanked the Nepal Army for the incredible job they have been doing for the rescue.

== Personal life ==
Dix first married Karen Beckmann, and he has three children from this marriage. He then married Divina Dix, who has a child from an earlier marriage.

== Awards and honours ==
Dix was a finalist in the 2026 Victorian Australian of the Year awards .

=== Awards ===
- In 2011, he was the recipient of the Alan Neyland Tunnelling Society award for tunnel fire safety excellence.
- In 2022, Dix was honoured with a Committee Service Award by the National Fire Protection Association of the United States of America for his contribution to road and rail tunnel fire safety.
- In 2023, Dix received recognition from Australian Prime Minister Anthony Albanese for his work in the Uttarakhand tunnel rescue.
- In 2024, Dix was awarded a Distinguished Alumni Award by Monash University.

== Publications ==
- Dix, A. (2005). "Tunnel Fire Safety and the Law". In Beard, Alan; Carvel, Richard (eds.). The Handbook of Tunnel Fire Safety. Thomas Telford. doi:10.1680/hotfs.31685.0020
- Burns, Penelope; Stevens, Garry; Sandy, Kate; Dix, Arnold; et al. (2013). "Human behaviour during an evacuation scenario in the Sydney Harbour Tunnel". Australian Journal of Emergency Management. uwchambers.com/wp-content/uploads/2020/05/AJEM_Vol_28No1articleonly.pdf
- Dix, A. (2011). The Fatal Burnley Tunnel Crashes Melbourne, Victoria, Australia Incident – 23 March 2007 (Expert Report for Victorian Coroner). uwchambers.com/wp-content/uploads/2020/05/Dix-Report-Burnley-9.6.11.pdf
- Dix, A. (2011). "Risk Analysis – from the Garden of Eden to its Seven most Deadly Sins". 14th International Symposium on Aerodynamics and Ventilation of Tunnels (ISAVT 14), Dundee, Scotland. uwchambers.com/wp-content/uploads/2020/05/seven_sins_final1.pdf
- Dix, A. (2012). "Cable Certification – Crisis or Crossroads?". Tunnelling Journal, Oct/Nov 2012. uwchambers.com/wp-content/uploads/2020/05/Tunnelling-Journal-Cable-Certification-Crisis-or-Crossroads-Oct-Nov-2012-issue.pdf
- Dix, A. (2013). "Emergency Cable Cert Withdrawal – 3M/UL". Tunnelling Journal. uwchambers.com/wp-content/uploads/2020/05/Tunnelling-Journal-Emergency-Cable-Cert-Withdrawal-3M-UL-Article-2-2013.pdf
- Dix, A. (2016). "Doing the Best with the Resources Available: Tunnel Safety and Security in a Severely Resources Limited World". ISTSS Montreal 2016. uwchambers.com/wp-content/uploads/2020/05/A-Dix-Paper-ISTSS-Montreal-2016.pdf
- Dix, A. (2019). "“Rock Beats Paper” – The Renaissance of Fairness in Ground Risk Allocation – the new ITA/FIDIC Emerald Book". Tunnelling Journal, September 2019. uwchambers.com/wp-content/uploads/2020/05/Tunnelling-Journal-Rock-Beats-Paper-Emerald-Book-Sept-2019.pdf
- Dix, A. (2020). "Regulatory Baseline Reporting: The Case for Quantifying Expected Regulatory Costs and Delays in a Baseline Report – Lessons in Crown Unfairness from Australia". International Journal of Civil Engineering and Technology (IJCIET), Volume 11, Issue 08, August 2020. doi:10.34218/IJCIET.11.8.2020.006 www.iaeme.com/IJCIET/issues.asp?JType=IJCIET&VType=11&IType=8
- Dix, A. (2020). "Air Cleaning Technologies for Tunnels – Honesty is the Best Policy for Protecting Human Health". International Journal of Civil Engineering and Technology (IJCIET), Volume 11, Issue 1, January 2020. www.iaeme.com/ijciet/issues.asp?JType=IJCIET&VType=11&IType=1
- Dix, A. (2020). "The Renaissance of Fairness in Ground Risk Allocation – The New ITA/FIDIC Emerald Book". International Journal of Civil Engineering and Technology (IJCIET), Volume 11, Issue 1, 2020. www.iaeme.com/ijciet/issues.asp?JType=IJCIET&VType=11&IType=1
- Dix, Arnold (2025). The Promise: How an everyday hero made the impossible possible. Australia, AU: Simon & Schuster Australia. ISBN 1761429167
