= Telangana tunnel collapse =

Tunnel collapse in Telangana

- Date: February 22, 2025
- Location: Nagarkurnool, Telangana; 16°6′34.92″N 78°53′12.44″E
- Cause: Tunnel collapse
- Deaths: 2
- Missing: 6

On 22 February 2025, a significant tunnel collapse occurred in the Nagarkurnool district of Telangana, India, within the Srisailam Left Bank Canal (SLBC) project. The collapse trapped eight engineers and laborers inside the tunnel.

The bodies of two of the eight trapped workers had been recovered around a month after the tunnel collapse. Over 700 personnel from various agencies have engaged in the search and rescue operation, amid reports that all 8 trapped workers have been confirmed dead.

== Background ==
An agreement to build the SLBC tunnel was made in 2005 during the administration of late Y. S. Rajasekhara Reddy. This is also World’s longest irrigation tunnel. It being constructed on the left bank of the Srisailam Reservoir in Telangana The tunnel would draw 30 tmc ft of water to irrigate 400,000 acres in Nalgonda and Khammam district. The tunnel would also provide drinking water to 516 villages that fall on the route.

== Collapse ==
On the day of the accident, The Robbins Company, based in the USA and known for providing Tunnel Boring Machines (TBMs), was leading the operations. Telangana Irrigation Minister N. Uttam Kumar Reddy quoted project manager Mr. Glen, stating that 70 personnel, including engineers, entered the tunnel as usual at 8 a.m. on Saturday, February 22, 2025.

“While a few personnel were at the front, the rest were further back. A small leak was noticed, which the site engineers considered not unusual. In large projects like this, these small leaks are common, and work typically continues,” Mr. Glen reportedly told the Minister.

However, disaster struck when a sudden surge of water and slush hit with such force that it pushed the machine backward, causing workers to flee for their lives. Eight individuals who were near the location of the sudden breach were unable to escape in time.

== Search and rescue efforts ==
Immediately following the collapse, rescue operations were initiated by local authorities, involving over 700 personnel from various agencies. The efforts faced significant challenges due to the unstable geological conditions and the risk of further collapses.

A total of eight individuals—including engineers and labourers—were trapped in the Srisailam Left Bank Canal project tunnel when a portion of it collapsed on February 22.

On 9 March, rescue teams recovered the body of Gurpreet Singh, a tunnel-boring machine operator from Punjab, from the tunnel. On 25 March, the body of Manoj Kumar a project engineer from Uttar Pradesh was discovered approximately 50 metres from the conveyor belt during excavation with a mini excavator.

As of 9 April 2025, efforts are still on to restore the Loco train track reaching out to the roof collapse site in the SLBC tunnel.

As of 12 October 2025, only two bodies have been recovered, and the rest are presumed to be missing under the debris.

== Aftermath ==
Telangana Chief Minister Revanth Reddy visited the collapse site to oversee the rescue operations and ensure that all necessary resources were being utilized. He announced an ex-gratia payment of ₹25 lakh to the families of the deceased workers and assured that the government would take all possible measures to rescue the remaining trapped workers.

Most of the tunnel is completed with only 9.6 km stretch of tunnel being left to be drilled however due to the collapse the work has been halted temporarily. As of 6 May 2025 the bodies of 6 other victims still hasn't been recovered rescue work is ongoing a national-level technical expert committee has been formed to facilitate the resumption of the SLBC project as the project is important for the district according to N Uttam Kumar Reddy the state irrigation minister who said "We cannot abandon the project, as it is a long-standing aspiration of the people of Nalgonda district, and it will turn the region into a fertile green belt."

== See also ==
- Uttarakhand tunnel rescue
