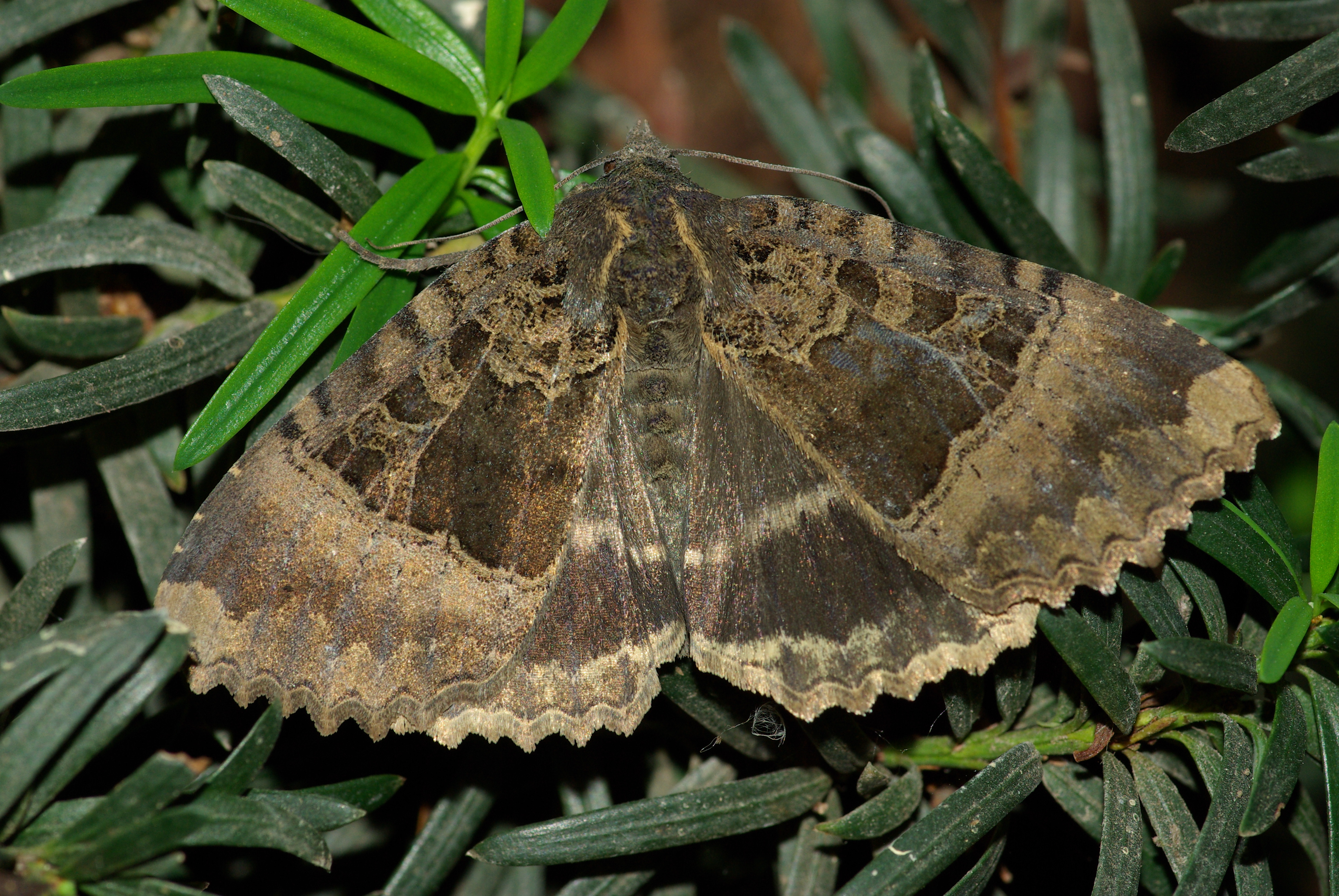

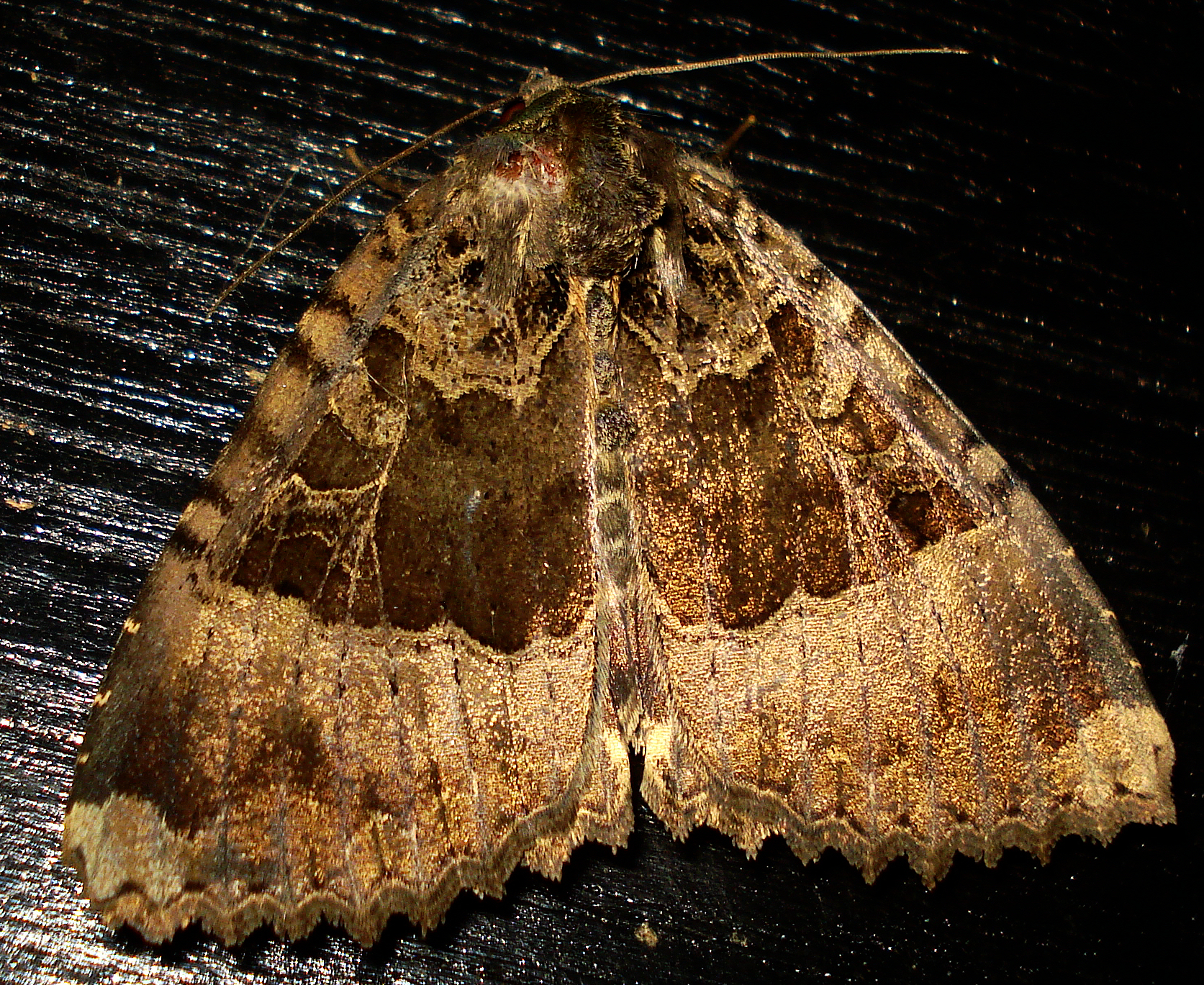

Scientific classification
- Kingdom: Animalia
- Phylum: Arthropoda
- Class: Insecta
- Order: Lepidoptera
- Superfamily: Noctuoidea
- Family: Noctuidae
- Genus: Mormo
- Species: M. maura

Binomial name
- Mormo maura (Linnaeus, 1758)

Synonyms
- Phalaena maura Linnaeus, 1758

= Mormo maura =

Species of moth

Mormo maura, the old lady or black underwing, is a species of moth of the family Noctuidae. The species was first described by Carl Linnaeus in the 10th edition of his Systema Naturae. It is found in the Palearctic realm, from north-western Africa through all over southern Europe. It reaches its northern border in the west in northern Ireland and central Scotland, in central Europe, in northern Germany and Poland. In some Nordic countries, there are single finds. The other occurrence areas include Turkestan, Anatolia, the Middle East and Iraq. The name "old lady" refers to the fact that the wing pattern was said to resemble the shawls worn by elderly Victorian ladies.

== Technical description and variation ==
The wingspan is 55–65 mm. The length of the forewings is 30–36 mm. Forewing dull fuscous blackish, the median area usually darker; the paler ground colour being really ochreous grey, thickly dusted with fuscous; subbasal line double, forming two series of groups of black scales across basal area; inner and outer lines double, filled in with pale, both oblique basewards below vein 1; median vein and its branches pale; subcostal space with five black blotches above median area; orbicular stigma large, oblique, pale with dark dusting; reniform dark with pale outline, widened outwards on both sides below; submarginal line pale preceded by a dark fuscous shade, angled outwards above and below middle; apical area above vein 6 pale grey; hindwing dull fuscous, with a straight pale band beyond middle, followed by a broad black striata, subterminal border, outwardly edged by a pale submarginal line; in the form striata Tutt the transverse lines as well as the median vein and veinlets are conspicuously pale. See also Fibiger, M. et al., 2007

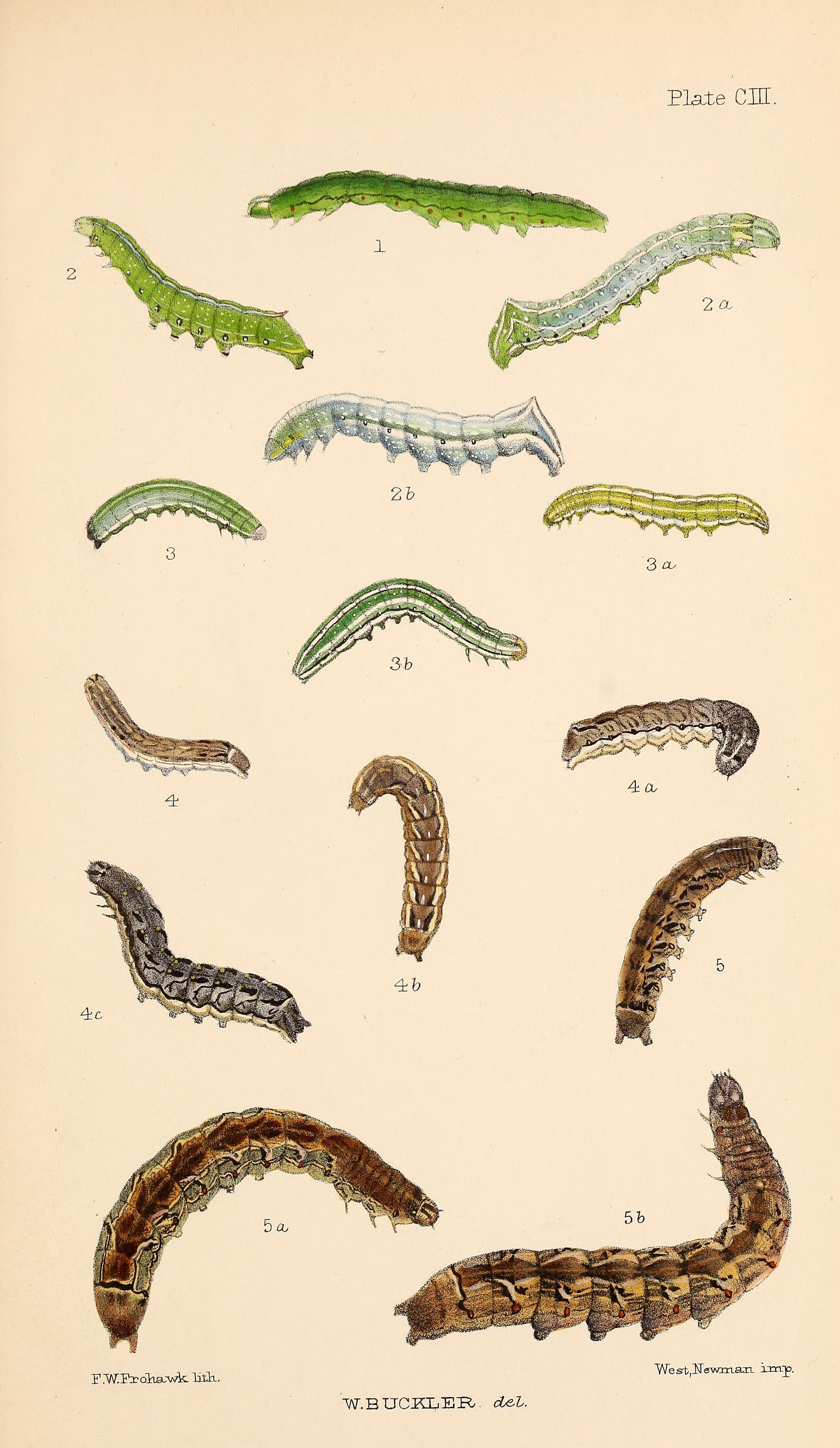
Fig 5 young larva 5a, 5b larvae after last moult

== Biology ==
The moth flies in one generation from mid-June to mid-September.

It is often found in damp habitats, such as floodplains, moors, river banks, and also hedgrows or woodland.

The larvae are pale ochreous, clouded with darker; dorsal and subdorsal lines whitish, irregular, with oblique pale darker-edged streaks between; spiracles reddish above a yellow line above the feet; on the 11th segment, there is a yellowish-white black-edged transverse stripe. The larvae feed on various herbaceous plants in the early stages (Salix, Alnus, Rumex, Senecio, Taraxacum) and later on various deciduous trees and shrubs.

== Gallery ==
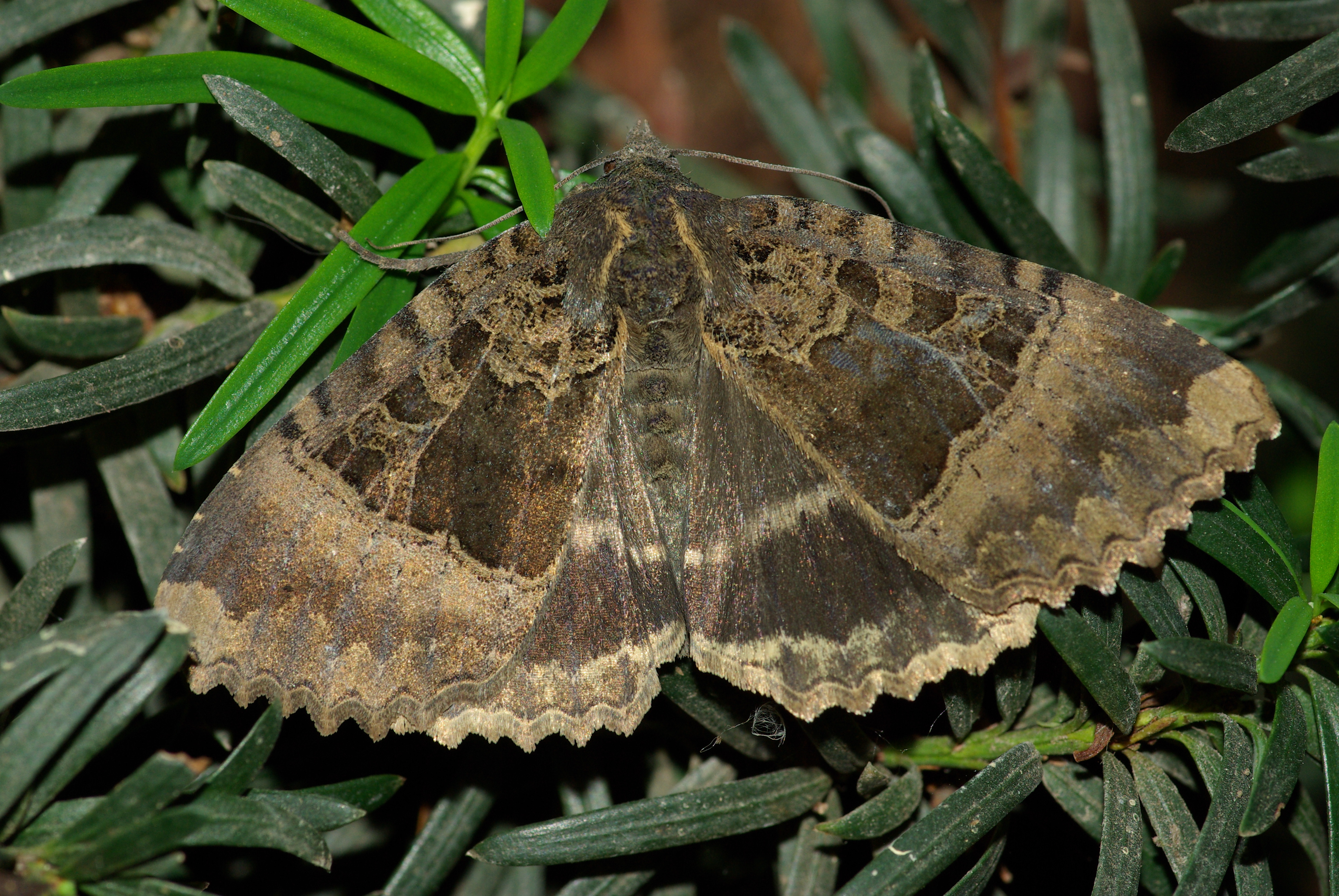

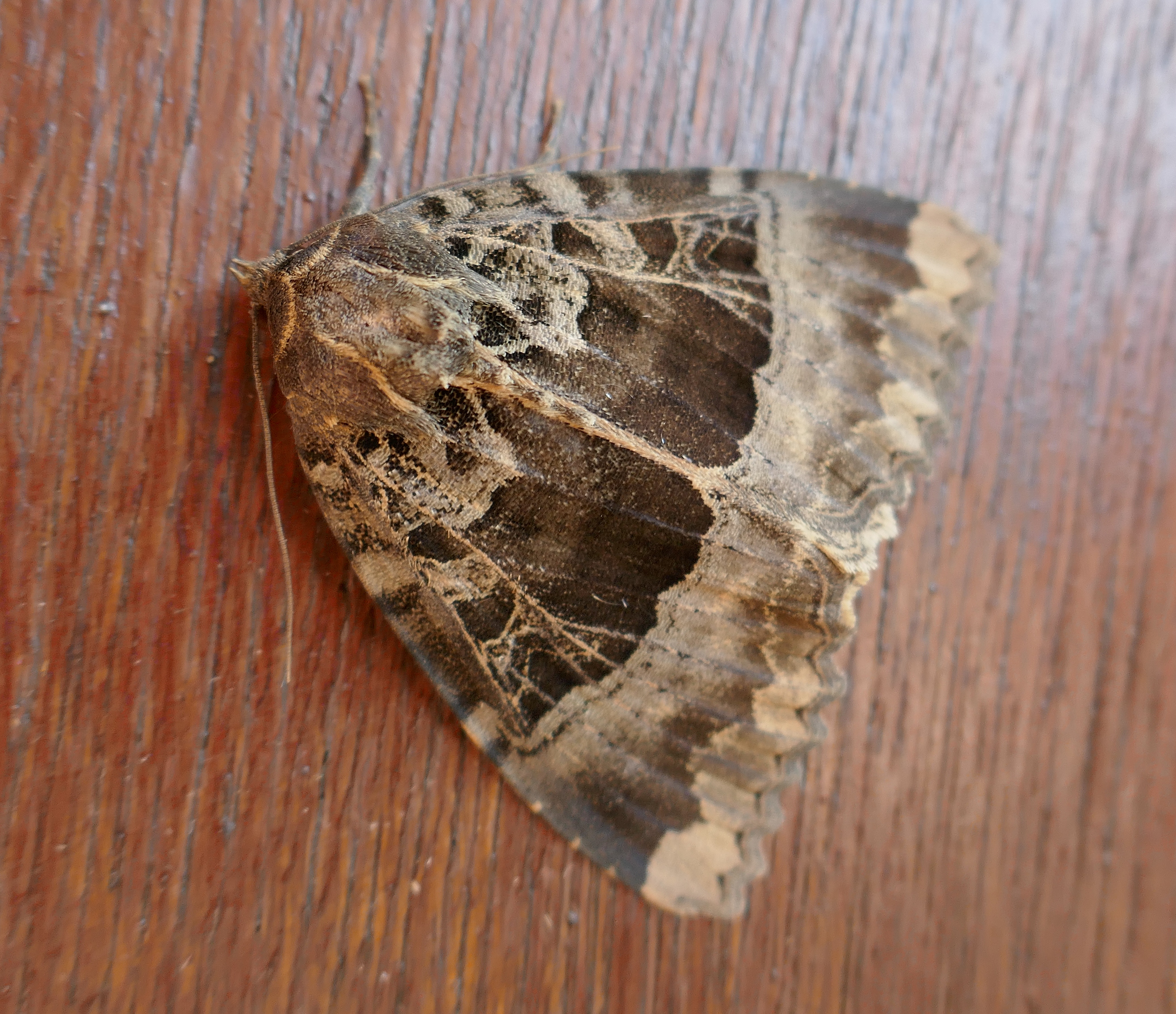

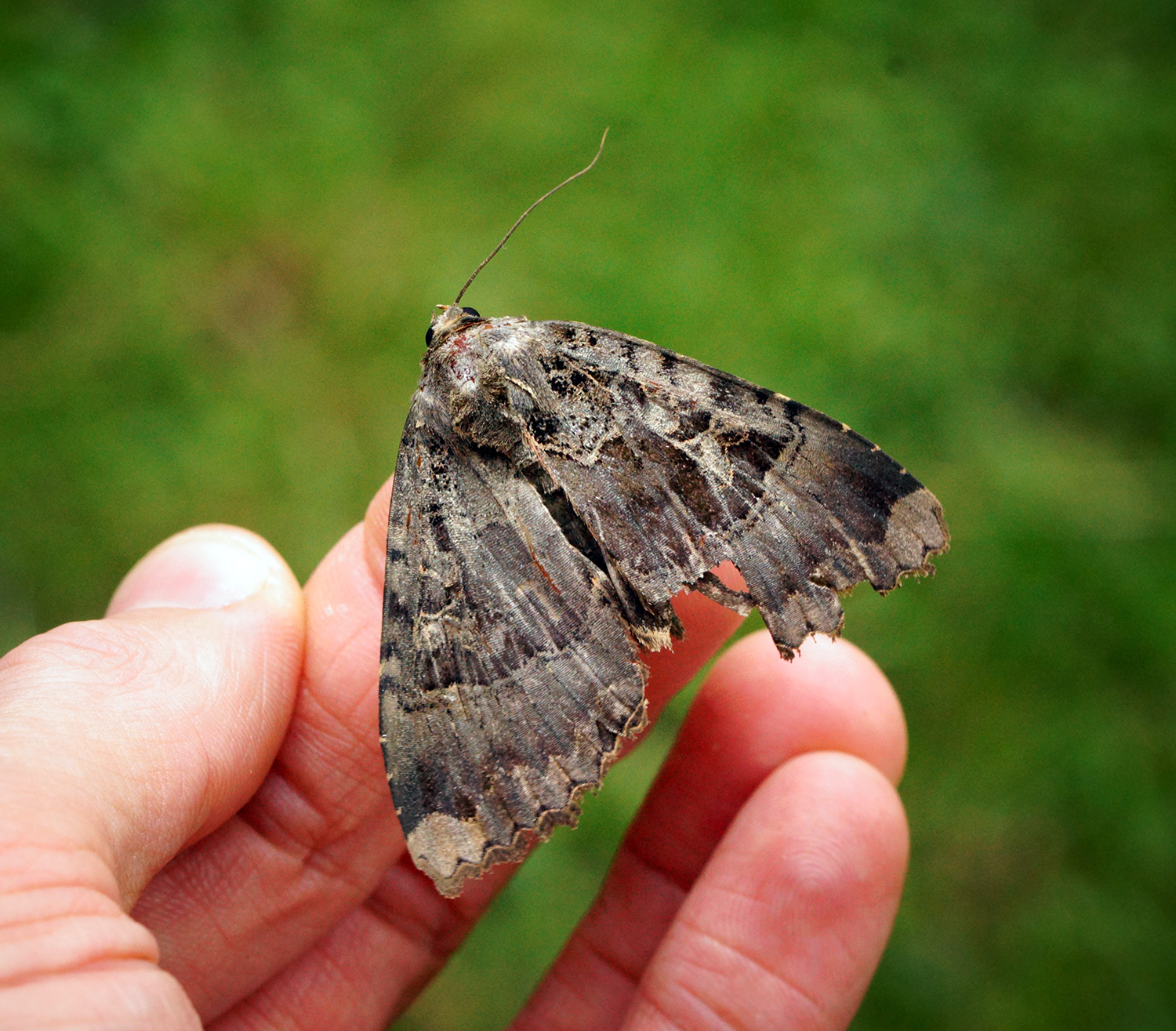

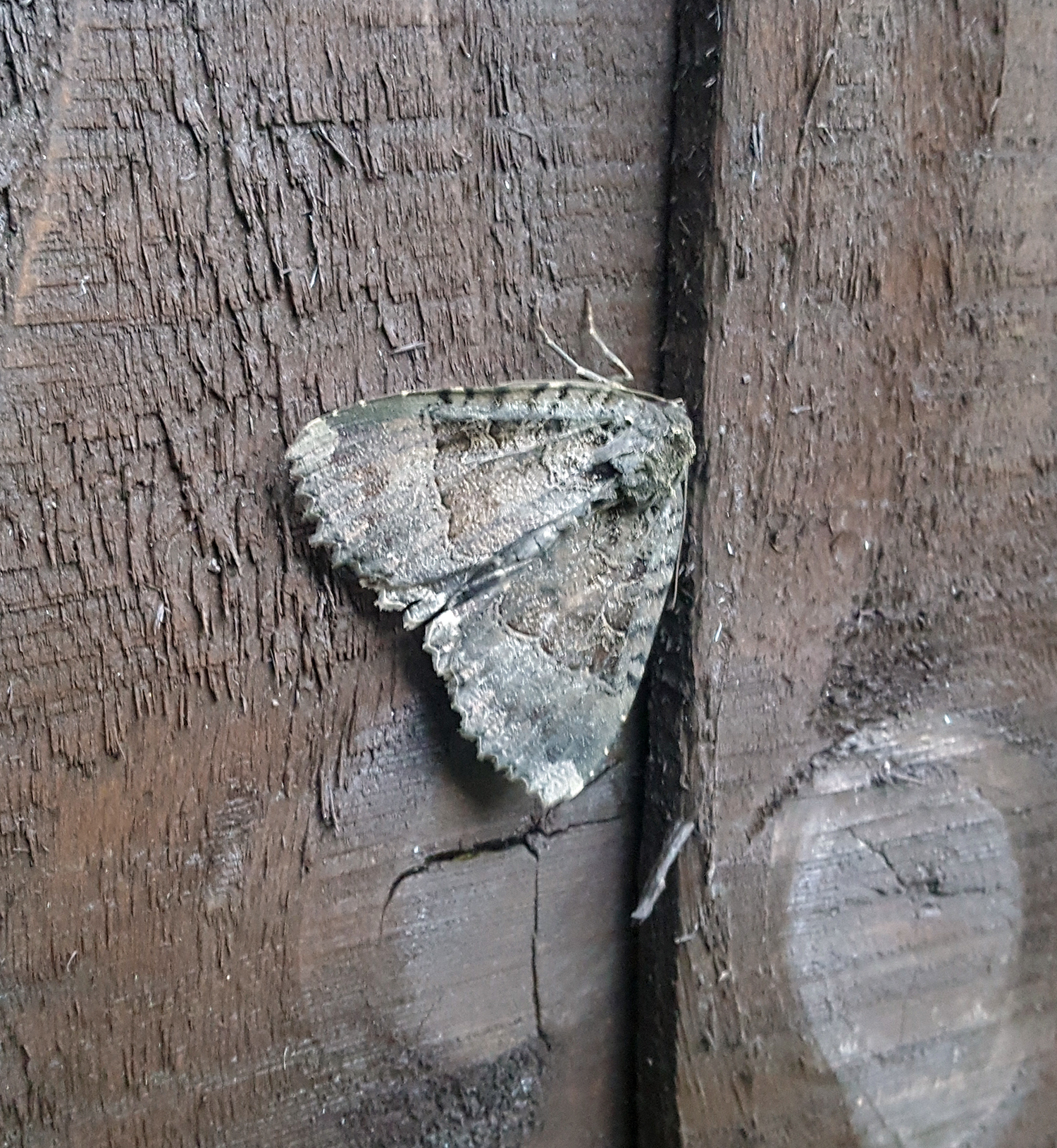

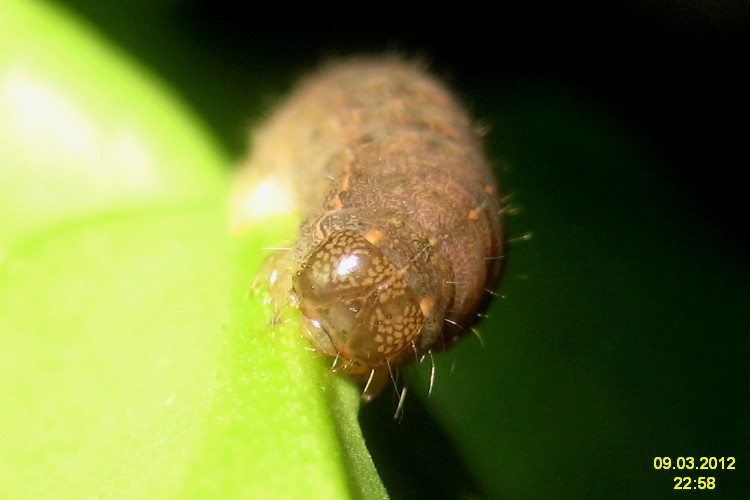

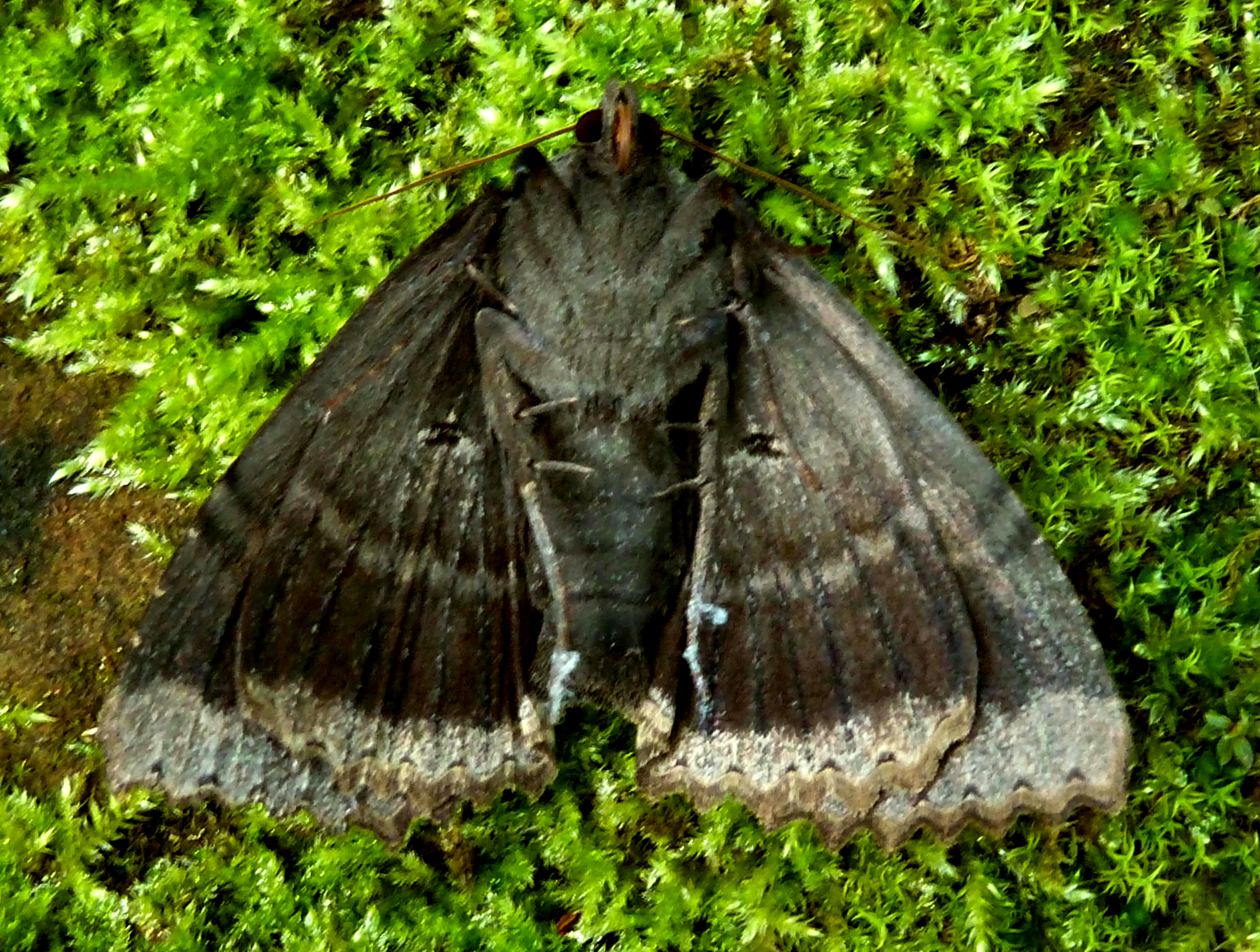

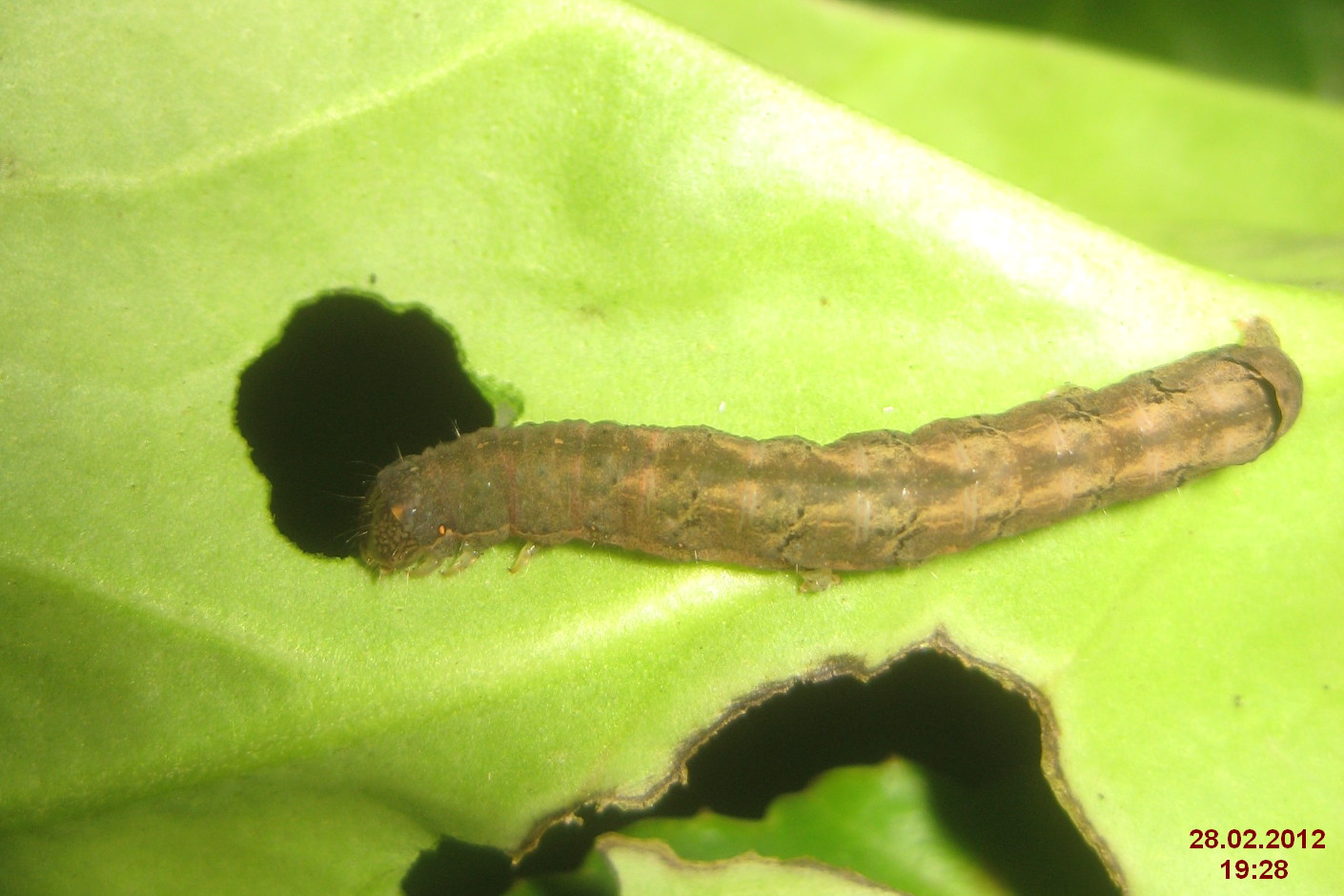

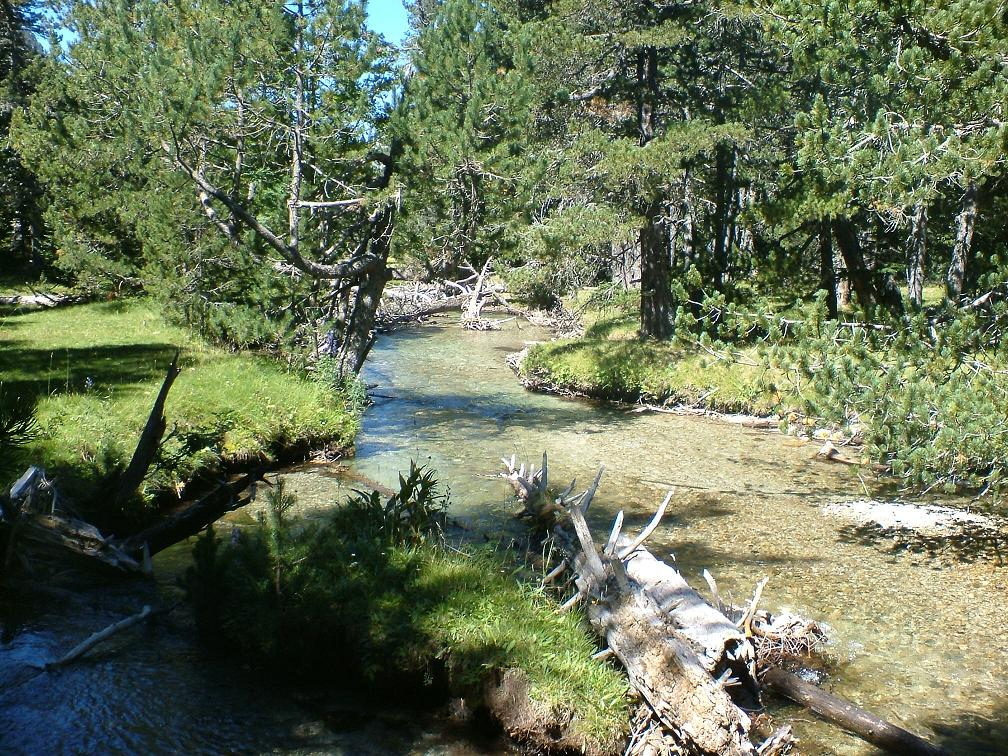
Habitat in Spain

== Notes ==
1. The flight season refers to Belgium and the Netherlands. This may vary in other parts of the range.
