= National Highway 134 (India) =

National highway in India

National Highway 134
- Map of National Highway 134 in red

Route information
- Auxiliary route of NH 34
- Length: 95 km (59 mi)

Major junctions
- South end: Dharasu
- North end: Yamunotri

Location
- Country: India
- States: Uttarakhand

Highway system
- Roads in India; Expressways; National; State; Asian
← NH 133	→ NH 135

National Highway 134, commonly referred to as NH 134, is a national highway in India. It is a spur road of National Highway 34. NH-134 traverses the state of Uttarakhand.

== Route ==
Dharasu – Kuthnaur – Yamnotri.

== Junctions ==
NH 34 Terminal near Dharasu.

== Silkyara Bend – Barkot Tunnel ==
The Cabinet Committee on Economic Affairs approved the Silkyara Bend – Barkot Tunnel in Uttarakhand in February 2018. The tunnel will be 4.531 kilometres (2.815 mi) long, two lanes, bi-directional and with escape passages including approaches. The total project cost is Rs. 1383.78 crore while the tunnel project will cost Rs. 1119.69 crore. The tunnel will reduce the travel distance from Dharasu to Yamunotri by about 20 kilometres (12 mi) and travel time by about an hour and provide all-weather connectivity.

On 12 November, 2023, a section of the tunnel collapsed while under construction, trapping 41 tunnel workers. Rescue operations were immediately launched, and successfully concluded 16 days later, on 28 November.

== See also ==
- List of national highways in India
- List of national highways in India by state
