= Khliehriat =

Village in Meghalaya, India

Coordinates: 25.359°N 92.367°E

Khliehriat is the headquarters of the East Jaintia Hills district in the Meghalaya state of India. This district' together with the West Jaintia Hills district, was carved out of the Jaintia Hills district.

Khliehriat and Saipung are the two community and rural development blocks of the district.

Khliehriat has a government hospital and a few private clinics. The majority of the population subscribes to the Christian faith and there are many churches in Khliehriat. There are many schools, including Khliehriat Higher Secondary School. Football and bull fighting are some of the major crowd attractions.

Khliehriat has a fairly cold temperature throughout the year, accompanied by heavy rains in the monsoons.
