= East Jaintia Hills district =

East Jaintia Hills district Pait Wah
- District of Meghalaya
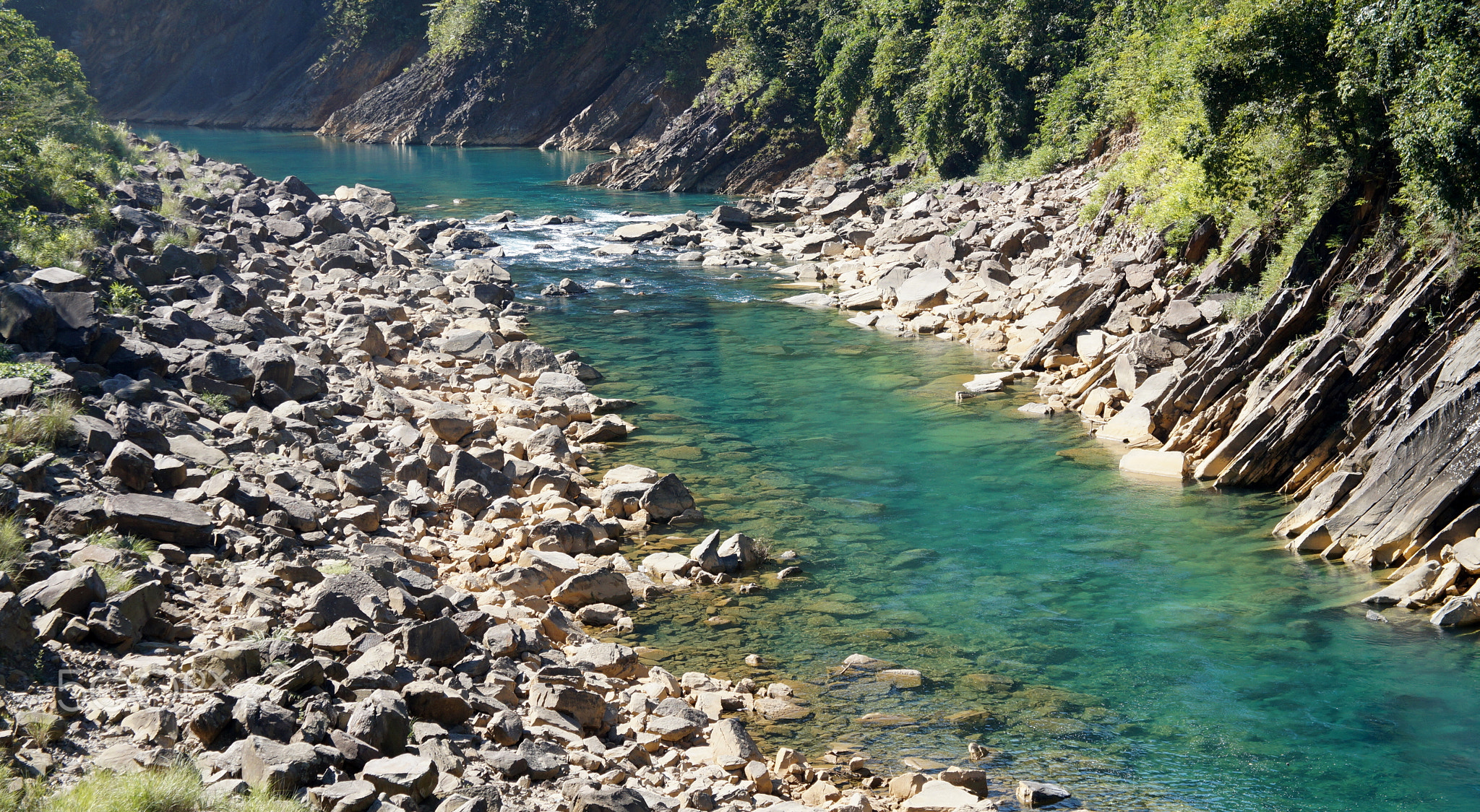
- Lukha River
- Interactive map of East Jaintia Hills district
- Country: India
- State: Meghalaya
- Headquarters: Khliehriat

Government
  - Vidhan Sabha constituencies: 3

Area
  - Total: 2,040 km^{2} (790 sq mi)

Population (2011)
  - Total: 122,939
  - Density: 60.3/km^{2} (156/sq mi)

Demographics
  - Literacy: 53%
- Time zone: UTC+05:30 (IST)
- Major highways: NH-6
- Website: eastjaintiahills.gov.in

East Jaintia Hills district is a district with its headquarters at Khliehriat in Meghalaya state of India. The district was carved out of Jaintia Hills district on 31 July 2012.

Khliehriat and Saipung are the two community and rural development (C&RD) blocks of the district.

== History ==
East Jaintia Hills District was carved out of the erstwhile Jaintia Hills District on 31 July 2012. Khliehriat, the district headquarters, was created as an administrative unit on August 14, 1976, and was upgraded to a civil sub division on May 27, 1982, before finally becoming the district headquarters.

== Geography ==
The total area of the district is 2,115 km^{2} (817 sq mi). The district comprises 2 C&RD, viz. Khliehriat C&RD block, and Saipung C&RD block with the following boundaries:

- North - Assam and West Jaintia Hills District
- South - Bangladesh and Assam
- East - Assam
- West - West Jaintia Hills District

=== Villages ===
- Mookhep

== Divisions ==
East Jaintia Hills district is divided into two blocks, namely:

Name	Headquarters	Population	Location
Khliehriat	Khliehriat		
Saipung	Saipung		

== Demographics ==
Religion in East Jaintia Hills (2011)
Religions
Christians	72.32%
Others*	24.60%
Hindus	2.37%
Other or not stated	0.71%
*Animists and ethnic religions

Mainly inhabited by the Pnar (also known as Jaintia), Khynriam and the Biates, East Jaintia Hills has a population of 1,22,939. Scheduled Tribes make up 118,158 (96.11%) of the population.

Languages of East Jaintia Hills district (2011)
1. Pnar (81.4%)
2. Biate (9.04%)
3. Khasi (6.30%)
4. War (3.16%)
5. Others (0.11%)

At the time of the 2011 census, 81.39% of the population spoke Pnar, 9.04% Biate, 6.30% Khasi and 3.16% War as their first language.

== See also ==
- Narpuh Wildlife Sanctuary, wildlife sanctuary in the district
