= Jaintia Hills district =

Jaintia Hills District was a district in Meghalaya, India that was established in 1972 with headquarters at Jowai which was taken from the United Khasi Jaintia Hills District Council. It was once part of the ancient Jaintia Kingdom. The present inhabitants of the District are the Pnar, the War, the Bhoi (Karbis), Tiwa (Lalung) and the Biates In 2012 the district has been bifurcated into two districts:-

- East Jaintia Hills district headquartered at Khliehriat
- West Jaintia Hills district headquartered at Jowai
