= Biate language =

Sino-Tibetan language of Northeast India

Biate
- Region: India
- Ethnicity: Biate
- Native speakers: (19,000 cited 1997); 35,000 (2021)
- Language family: Sino-Tibetan: Central Tibeto-Burman (?); Kuki-Chin-Naga; Kuki-Chin; Central; Biate
- Writing system: Latin

Language codes
- ISO 639-3: biu
- Glottolog: biet1238 Biete
- ELP: Biete

The Biate language, also known as Biete language, is a Sino-Tibetan language spoken by the Biate people in several parts of northeast India. Biate is pronounced as Bia-te (the e in te pronounced as "a").

== Geographical distribution ==
Biate is spoken in the following locations (Ethnologue).

- Assam: Dima Hasao District and Cachar district
- Meghalaya: West Jaintia Hills, East Jaintia Hills and East Khasi Hills district
- Manipur: Churachandpur district
- Mizoram: Aizawl district
- Tripura: Jampui Hills

== Basic vocabulary ==
Biate	Meaning
Im ne riming?	What is your name?
Ke riming chu Thiangchonsinga	My name is Thiangchonsinga
Ki lôm (ki-lôm)	Thank You
Ni damim?	How are you?
Ki dam	I am fine
Tui	Water
Phâivua	Air
Bu	(cooked) rice
Inga(sa)	fish (meat)
Ar(sa)	chicken(meat)
Voksa	pork
Sialsa	beef
Kêlsa	mutton
Thlâichi	vegetable
Dal	lentils
Chial(Chi-al)	salt
Chithlum(Chi-thlum)	sugar
Aroi	less
Marcha	chilli
Ne peh nôk roh	Please give again (serve again).
A inrup	enough
Tui ne peh roh	Please give water.
Bu ne peh roh	Please give food (rice).
An ne peh roh	Please give (side dish) vegetable / meat.
Im nang ki pek rang?	Give what?
Im?	What?
Tikinta?	When? (past)
Tikinim?	When? (future)
Taka'm / tak tiangim?	Where?
Ingkanim?	How?
Mangṭha.	Sleep well. (The equivalent of "Good Night".)
Ingkanim ki fe rang Mualsei?	How do I go to Mualsei?
Izaka'm a man Epu / Epi?	What is the price of this? (Epu is masculine gender, Epi is feminine gender)
Lôm takkan fe roh.	Happy journey

=== Numbers ===
0	Hual
1	Khatka
2	Nika
3	Thumka
4	Lika
5	Ringaka
6	Rukka
7	Sarika
8	Riatka
9	Kuakka
10	Somka
20	Sominika
30	Somithumka
40	Somilika
50	Somringaka
60	Somrukka
70	Somsarika
80	Somriatka
90	Somkuakka
100	Rizaka
200	Rizanika
300	Rizathumka
400	Rizalika
500	Rizaringaka
600	Rizarukka
700	Rizasarika
800	Rizariatka
900	Rizakuakka
1000	Sangka
10000	Sîngka
100000	Nuaika
1000000	Dâpka
10000000	Mit-en
100000000	Thlîr
1000000000	Vânnuaidâp
