= Biate people =

Ethnic hill tribe of Northeast India

Biate
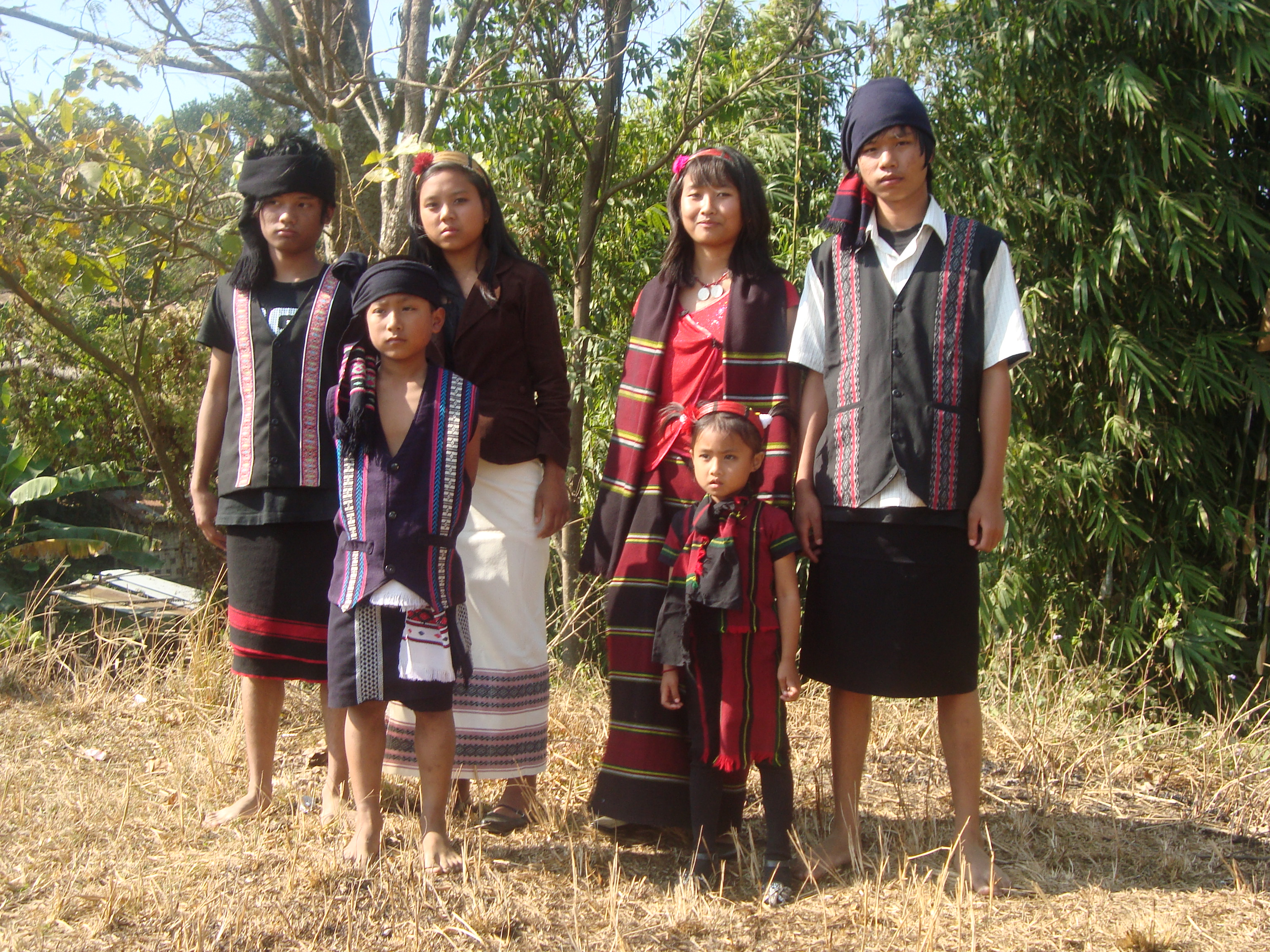

Total population
- 50,000+

Regions with significant populations
- India; Meghalaya · Assam · Manipur · Mizoram · Tripura

Languages
- Biate

Religion
- Christianity

Related ethnic groups
- Chin · Kuki · Mizo

The Biates are an ethnic hill tribe of Assam, Meghalaya, Mizoram, Tripura and Manipur. Their language belongs to the Tibeto-Burman family. Spread over many parts of North-East India, they have a unique identity with a rich and distinctive history, culture, dialect and religious heritages. They are one of the oldest hill tribes of North East India especially among the Chin-Kuki-Mizo people. The term Biate comes from the word Bia-te. The word ‘Bia’ or ‘Biak’ means ‘speak’ or ‘worship’. ‘Te’ is a suffix denoting plurality. Hence, the two words combine to form the word Biate, which means worshipper.

According to legends, while they were in Saitual, a group of people known as the Koilam or Kawilam from Rulchawm village of Mizoram (India) used to sacrifice human to appease a large python called Rulpui, believing that the snake had supernatural power. Thus, some writers are of the opinion that the word Biate originates from the term Rul-Bia-Te or Rul-Biak-Te, which means snake-worshippers in other dialects. However, this hypothesis is questionable, because the Biates, as a tribe, never fed or worshipped a snake except one. The offering sacrifices by one village was also not as worshiping a God, but due to their fear and timidity and that too only for some time. Some other tribes call them in different names. The Mizos call them ‘Biahte’, the Thadou call them Beite, other plain tribes call them ‘Baite’, the Dimasa Kacharis call them ‘Bedesa’ and the Khasis call them Hadem, which includes all the old-Kuki tribes of Meghalaya. Soppitt C. A. a renowned English writer account as ‘Bêtê’.

== Ethnology ==
=== Origin ===
According to legend, the Biates descended from the Manmási, whose progeny were Riama and Vaia. Riama (ancestor of the Biate tribe) descended by Kuangpuia and Vaia, who were descended by Khuangzang, Khuangsai, Chilzang, and Lamzang (Lamkang). Kuangpuia had a son named Ralkhana, whose wife Kolsingi gave birth to five children namely Beia, Thianga, Laia, Ngola and Thiaia.

They are believed to have originated from a place called Khurpui or great cave. The ancient home of the Biates is also known as Sinlung (Sinlung means the core of Sin or cave close with stone). The conjecture of Sinlung as the origin of the Biate tribe is strongly supported by a folk song about the glory of Sinlung:

"Ken siangna Sinlung ram mingthang,
Kinu ram kipa ram ngai;
Chongzil ang koi kir thei chang se,
Kinu ram kipa ram ngai."

"My genesis famous land of Sinlung,
Land of my mother and father;
Could it be called back like Chongzil,
Land of my mother and father."

Chongzil is the place where the Biate ancestors began their historical migration. Tracing back through orally histories, the Biate tribe with its cognate clans may have started a migration from China between 206 BC and 202 BC—between the fall of the Qin Shi Huang's kingdom and the emergence of the Han dynasty. Their migration, according to L. H. Songate, was due to acute oppression and maltreatment in the construction of that great wall or fortress by a cruel king Shi-Huang. At the same time many of them lost their lives. The tribes then proceeded towards south met stiff resistance when they began to settle in the bordering area of Burma and China. They finally waged a war against ‘Zainghong’ and won a triumphant victory. This victory has been immortalised in a song:

"Ki pa lam tlâk atha’n dang,
Sinlung lam tlak atha’n dang;
Shan khua thaphoi in vang,
Tuaichongi ranlu a thluna;
Thloimu siaka ken ane ril,
Zainghonga ranlu bah kan sal."

"My father’s position was extremely good,
Sinlung’s position was extremely good;
We showed our prime life in Shan,
Tuaichongi brought the head of enemies;
As foretold by the eagle’s claws,
At Zainghong we showed our ability to our foes."

The word Zainghong may be a corrupted word of Jinghong, which is in the province of Yunnan. They are also believed to have settled in the area of Mengban, Lancang, Menglian and Menghai for some time in the bygone days. The tribe flourished and was mark by a period of prosperous condition and life of ease. They learned and improved their art of war and began to observe and celebrate religious festivals. The tribe were now much more advanced than they were in Sinlung. C. A. Soppitt has accounted that the tribe had already reached Burma previous to the introduction of Buddhist doctrines, that is to say, in the 8th or 10th century. However, opinion varies among writers. According to P.M.Gangte the Mizo tribes (Old Kuki) has already occupied the present Chin Hills before the end of the 8th century AD. While the tribes settled in Shan (Burma), Zamadian (Zamadiai according to Songate, L. H.) was the Biate (Reng) monarch of all the Khawthlang tribes. The Khawthlang or Thlangfa tribes (Westerner) as considered by J. Shakespeare, were the Old Kukis, the Biate (Beteh) and other cognate clans. Zamadian introduced almost all the customary laws of the Biate tribe and except for a few, most of them are still in use. Tradition says that Zamadiana had a written script 'Savunziak' of Kung-fu-tzu or Confucius. This script however was lost after his demise when a dog carried it away. He is believed to be the first to introduce ‘Zolbûk’ among his people. Zolbûk is a kind of dormitory or club, where young people use to learn different kind of art in it. Folk song tells of the migration of the Biate tribe from Shan to Kachin state, Sagaing, and Chin state and to Mizoram, India.

Mizo Historian K. Zawla says the Biate were the first to set foot in Mizoram. They also claim the hills round Champhai as their places of origin, and the sites are still known by their names. In the early days of their settlement in Mizoram, the Khawthlang tribes were ruled by the Biate king Vannuailala, son of Tengtonga Khoreng, who gave himself the title of ‘Chonpuimang’ (Chonmang in the account of Songate, L.H.). The Biates by spreading to all sides of the corner of Mizoram settled for nearly a thousand years, numerous hills and mountain, rivers, lakes, and places of Mizoram were named by the Biates, being a forerunner of the land. While they were settling in and around Invol (believed to be present day Lunglei district) they were invaded by the kingdom of Ava (1364–1555), a new kingdom founded by king Thadominbya after the Mongols left the Irrawaddy valley, Burma. During the invasion, one of the Biate clan the Ralvong Thiaite was hiding in a Ralvawng cave. These particular clans including the Ngamlai clans of Troi (present day Tawipui, Mizoram) who faced the brunt of the Ava invasion still tells of the account today.

"Ava ten khua hong fanga,
Kua Invol laia;
Aimo zola an ril,
Khua Invol laia."

"Ava had invaded us,
The time we were in Invol;
They tell in the valley of Aimo,
While we were in Invol."

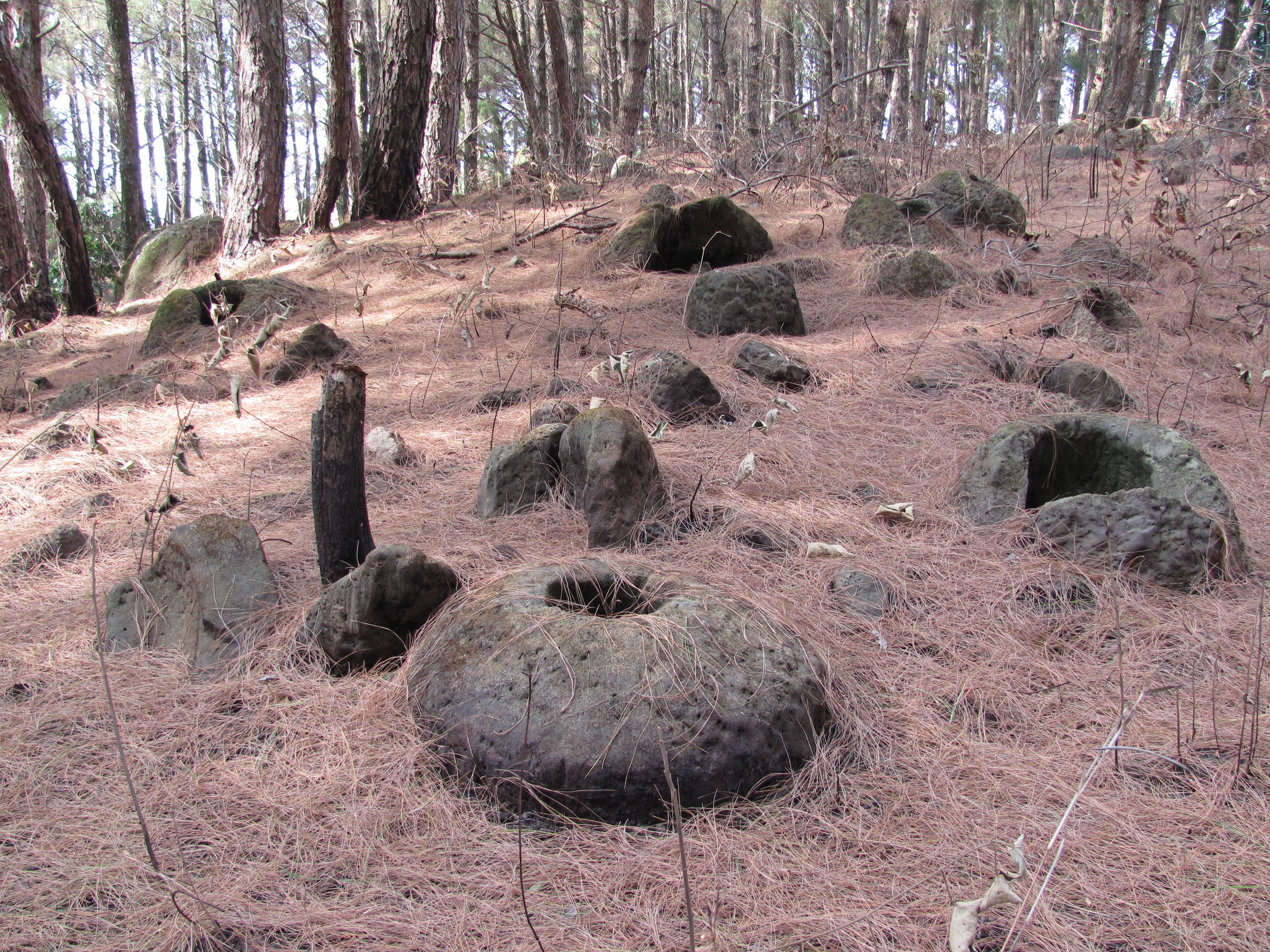
Lungzubel-a rice beer container at Meghalaya

In olden days Aizawl was called Aimo zôl (Aimo valley) by the Biate tribe. Aimoroi is a kind of wild ginger found in that place, the term Aimo is believed to be derived from the name aimoroi. According to traditions soon after the invasion of Ava, the Pawi tribe took advantage of their weakness, waged a tribal war with the intention of driving them out of their land and finally succeeded in chasing majority of them out of their land. From Mizoram they scattered in different places like Chittagong (Bangladesh), Rengpuiram (Tripura), Cachar, N. C. Hills Assam, then Jaintia Hills Meghalaya and some part of Manipur. Lamlira and a few of his followers were the first to migrate to the present land N. C. Hills, Assam and Jaintia Hills, Meghalaya. According to B. Pakem, Lamlira (A Biate legendary hero) led a section of the Biate tribe to their present hills. This was sometime in the 13th century. That was before the invasion of Ava. Their migration is believed to have been a search for better land.

Lamlira marked the land with his handiwork by moulding stones in different shape and sizes like man, animal, stone altar and different kind of vessels called Lungzubel which literally means "Stone rice beer container" in the Biate language. The artefacts could still be seen today in all Biate dominated areas and some other areas of Assam and Meghalaya which are also believed to have been inhabited by the Biates in olden days. Pakem, also wrote that these round stones and hollow ground resemble those found in the nearby Sumer Elaka, between Umkyurpong and Kseh villages in Meghalaya. He also believed that it might have been the sacrificial or dancing places of the Biates forefathers of the forerunner. In Biate it is called ‘Lamlira Lung Sin’ meaning ‘handiwork of Lamlira’ Many of the relics were gradually destroyed over time, by nature or man, as it was left abandoned and unguarded so long. The vast mountainous region of Jaintia and Naga Hills in the north, according to G.A. Grierson, is the home of the Kuki-Chin tribes. The second migration of the Biate tribe from Mizoram and nearby hills of Tripura took place between 1500 and 1600 AD. Whereas J. Shakespear wrote that the old Kukis made their appearance in Cachar about the end of the 18th century. Those of the old Kuki that migrates in the 18th centuries were the left over tribes in the second migration, who moved out of Mizoram to the plain of Cachar was due to the Sailo rebellion in the hills. B. Pakem, stated that the period under reference might have referred to the popular Biate in Mizoram and not to the Biates of Assam and Meghalaya.

=== Language ===
The Biate dialect is akin to Mizo (Lushai), Khawsak / Hmar etc.

=== Clan division ===
The Biate tribe have five major clans, and there are about 49 sub-clans. The five major clans are Nampui, Darnei, Ngamlai, Ngirsim (Lalsim) and Thiaite. Sub-clans of the Biate tribe are : 1.Chungngol 2.Kungte 3.Thianglai 4. Betlu 5. Bapui 6. Zamate 7. Durpui 8. Darzau 9. Dau 10.Darngôn 11.Fathlei 12.Faiheng 13.Fairiam 14.Dôn Zamate 15.Munring 16.Ngaite 17.Ngenrang 18.Khurbi 19.Khampuia 20.Khoreng 21.Khongul 22.Lianate 23.Lungngoi 24.Lungtrai 25.Pazamate 26.Pungte 27.Puilo 28.Rangchal 29.Roichek (Roichên) 30.Raiheng 31.Ranglem 32.Ralvong 33.Riamate 34.Saivate 35.Sonlen 36.Subuma 37.Salon 38.Theisir 39.Thangbei 40.Thloichir 41.Thlung-ur 42.Taizang 43.Tamatê 44.Tamlo 45.Thliran 46. Troi 47. Vangkal 48.Zali 49. Zate

According to Biate legends Zampui tlang dunga ei om laiin Saivate namtual asuak meaning the term Saivate clan came into existence while they were in Zampui tlang dung Zampui hill range, presently Jampui Hills in Tripura.

== Marriage ==
In marriage alliances a Biate is not restricted to any particular clan or sub-clan. Intermarriage may take place within the clan or the sub-clans; preference is given to marry other sub-clans of the tribe. A Biate can marry any woman but must avoid blood relations. The marriageable age for the male and female are 21 and 18 years respectively. If the boy is willing to marry a girl, a negotiator (Palai), usually the boy’s relative is sent to negotiate with the girl’s parents. This is called Ibiak, which is basically an engagement. If negotiation is successful, the parents fix a wedding date. The night of the wedding, the groom's family pays the bride price to the girl parents, around INR 185.00, and a bronze or copper plate called Mairang. According to tradition, the groom stays for seven years for 'Mak-sin' or 'in-law's duty' in his father-in-law's house, to assist them and develop a good relationship with his new family. At present, it is reduced to three years, but few practice this custom now. Divorce is rare, usually only for reasons like adultery, cruelty, barrenness, maladjustment, impotence, or insanity.

== Religion ==
Historically, the Biate tribe practiced animism, but they also strongly believed in a supreme being called Chung Pathian—which means the God above. They believe and feel the omnipresence, and thus acknowledge that Chung Pathian is above all gods. Meanwhile, the primordial god of the earth is called ‘Nuaia Malal’. Other primal gods and goddesses were Bolong Raja or Tarpa, Theisini Kara, Khua Vuai, Dangdo, Fapite, Sangkuru, Truanpuia etc. With the coming of Welsh Missionary Rev. Robert Evan and the Khasi missionary Mr. Khulu Malang the Biate embraced Christianity in the year 1890.

== Clothes and dresses ==
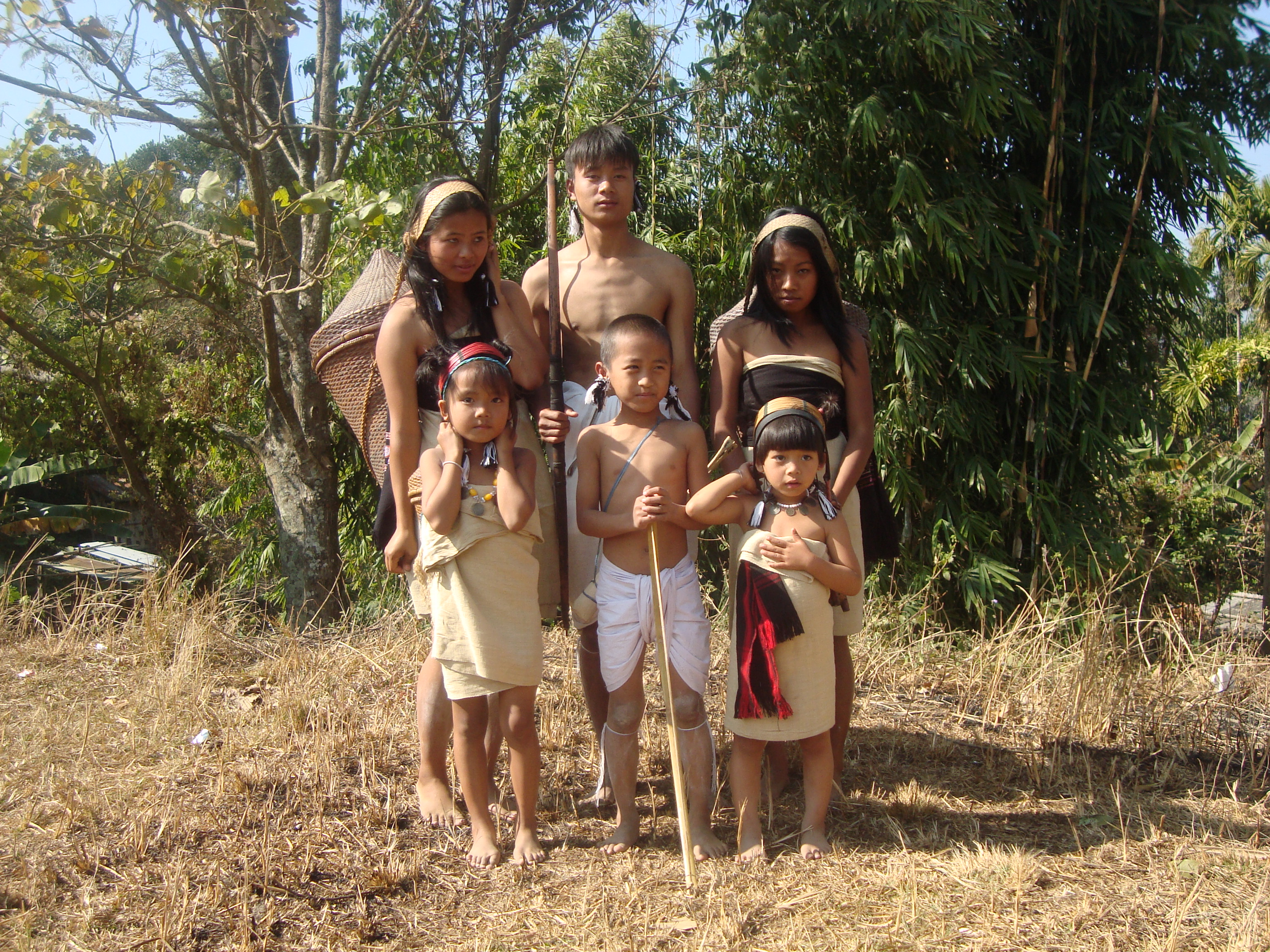
Early traditional dress

Like all other hill tribes of North East India, the Biates have their own cloth making system since time immemorial. A blanket (Puanpui) made out of cotton is highly regarded for the customary marriage gift. Besides cotton work, the Biates have a tradition of rearing silkworm. A shawl (Rilungpuan) and headgear (Lukom) is manufactured out of the silk thread. Among the Chin-Kuki-Mizo group, the Biates, Hrangkhols and Sakacheps (Khelma) are the only tribes who practice weaving silk clothing since time immemorial.
