= 2025 Assam mine incident =

Mining incident in Assam, India

- The town of Umrangso near which the incident occurred
- Date: January 6, 2025
- Location: Umrangso, Assam; 25.5062°N 92.7308°E
- Cause: Flooding due to Kopili river
- Deaths: 9
- Arrests: 2

On January 6, 2025, a group of miners became trapped in an illegal coal mine in the Dima Hasao district of Assam, India. They became trapped when water gushed in from a nearby unused mine.

== Background ==
Illegal mining is a significant issue in the state of Assam. The practice involves digging small tunnels, often by hand, to extract coal. These tunnels are dangerous and prone to collapse, which has resulted in many fatalities. The National Green Tribunal (NGT) banned rat-hole mining in 2014 due to its 'hazardous nature and environmental impact'. Despite this, illegal mining continues in several areas, including Umrangso and Ledo.

== Incident ==
The miners, at least 9 in number, became trapped in an illegal rat-hole mine on 6 January. This occurred after water gushed into the mine from an unused mine nearby. The mine is said to be 300-foot deep.

== Rescue operations ==
Rescue workers standing near the illegal rat-hole mine

The National Disaster Response Force (NDRF), State Disaster Response Force (SDRF), Indian Army, and the Navy have been deployed to the site. 100 rescuers in total are said to be at the site. As of 16 January, the bodies of four workers are said to have been recovered from the site. A team from the Geological Survey of India (GSI) has found that there were 140 million litres of water in the underground system of which the mine was a part, and that 40 million litres have been successfully removed.

The mine has been suspected to be connected to the Kopili River that flows in Meghalaya.

The rescue operation involved dewatering the flooded mine, but progress was reported to be slow. Limited visibility and the instability of the mine further impacted progress. A district official said that dewatering the mine and three abandoned ones nearby simultaneously with 10 pumps has failed to lower the water level, which has been reduced to about 12 metres from the 30 metres present on the day of the incident.

After 42 days, the bodies of the remaining 5 miners were recovered after the Army and the NDRF completed the dewatering process.

== Investigation and reactions ==
The mine has been determined to be an illegal operation, being previously leased by the Assam Mineral Development Corporation (AMDC) but was abandoned 12 years ago. Police have arrested two individuals in connection with the incident. The Chief Minister of Assam, Himanta Biswa Sarma, said that the mine "prima facie appears to be an illegal one".

Gaurav Gogoi, a Lok Sabha MP for Assam and a Congress leader, wrote on 11 January to Prime Minister Narendra Modi demanding the constitution of an SIT to probe the incident. The Congress also has spoken about the alleged involvement of the Chief Executive member of Dima Hasao Autonomous Council, Debolal Gorsola and his wife in illegal mining activities.

On 16 January, the Assam cabinet approved a judicial inquiry and decided the constitute the SIT. The judicial inquiry will be led by Anima Hazarika, a retired judge of the Gauhati High Court. Along with this, due to a police investigation in the Dima Hasao district, 220 other illegal mines have also been found.

On 28 January, it was reported that the Gauhati High Court had taken suo moto cognizance of the case, along with directing the state government to submit an affidavit of the case by February 7. This was done due to the role played by the government in allowing illegal mines to keep operating despite the previous order from the NGT to stop them.

== Relief ==
The Assam government announced an ex-gratia payment of ₹10 lakh (1 million) for the families of each victim involved in the incident. The amount has been partly drawn from the Chief Minister's Relief Fund.

== See also ==
- Mining scams in India
