= Jatinga =

- village
- Location in Assam, India Jatinga (India)
- Coordinates: 25.1149°N 92.9437°E
- Country: India
- State: Assam
- District: Dima Hasao

Government
  - Body: Dima Hasao, Jatinga Constituency

Population (2011)
  - Total: 2,500

Languages
  - Official: Pnar

Jatinga (/dʒəˈtɪŋɡə/also /dʒæ-/) is a village in Dima Hasao district, Assam, India. Located on a ridge, the village is 330 kilometres (210 mi) south of Guwahati. The village is inhabited by about 2,500 Khasi people, with a Dimasa minority. The village is named for the Jatinga station. The word "Jatinga" means "pathway" in Naga.

Jatinga is infamous for being the location of mysterious bird deaths. Theories abound as to why these fatal gatherings occur, including artificial light or intentional killings by locals. It has been called "the Bermuda Triangle of birds" and one of "the creepiest places on earth".

== Geography ==
Jatinga is part of the Dima Hasao district of Asam. Jatinga is located on a ridge, between the Jatinga Valley to the south and Dulong-Diyung Valley to the north, and is hilly, like much of Assam. To its east is the base of the Barail Range. Jatinga is the origin point of the Jatinga River. The area has a misty weather pattern, culminating in the fall (the end of monsoon season) with dense fog and strong winds from the northeast and southwest, which may be the cause of the infamous "bird suicides". The area is prone to landslides, and to flash flooding from the Jatinga River.

== History ==
Jatinga was founded in 1902 by Lakhon Bang Suchiang, who found the area suitable for farming. By 1916, 46 houses had been established there. The economy revolved mainly around orange and betel cultivation, which kept the village prosperous until 1947, when a disease outbreak killed a majority of orange plants, forcing farmers to relocate.

== Economy ==
As of 2025, agriculture makes up the largest percentage (37%) of Jatinga's income sources. Major crops including oranges, pineapples, ginger and culantro. Pig farming is a tribal tradition in Jatinga, and has been encouraged by conservationists as an alternative meat source to the wild birds killed for meat by locals. A major threat to Jatinga's agriculture is climate change; for example, Jatinga orange farmers are experiencing lower crop yields and malformed fruit as a result of the changing climate. Other threats to agriculture include predation of livestock by wildlife and rapid urbanization.

The area also relies on tourism, mainly from birdwatchers and ornithologists who come to see the mass bird gatherings. Such bird-centred tourism began in the 1980s; by 1998, tourism was so popular that plans to better develop Jatinga into a proper tourism destination were discussed in the Parliament of India, and Omak Apang revealed that sanctions had been made to allow for this. In 2006, more developed plans were made to make Jatinga more accessible to tourists by adding bathrooms to village huts, where visitors would stay, and by adding new viewing points for birdwatching. The effect on locals is mixed; while tourism allows locals to earn direct incomes, the village's small size makes it prone to structural pressures when large influxes of tourists arrive. The website for the Assam Department of Tourism promotes the bird gatherings as a tourism draw to Jatinga.

== Flora and Fauna ==
In addition to the infamous bird activity in the area, Jatinga is very diverse in moth species, especially those within the family Arctiinae, with 20 such species occurring in a single part of the village. Other moth families in abundance are Pyralidae and Geometridae. Lepidopterists often use the village's bird observation tower to view the moths.

In 2026, the rare flowering plant Rungia mastersii, unseen for 180 years, was rediscovered in the hills near the village.

== Bird deaths ==
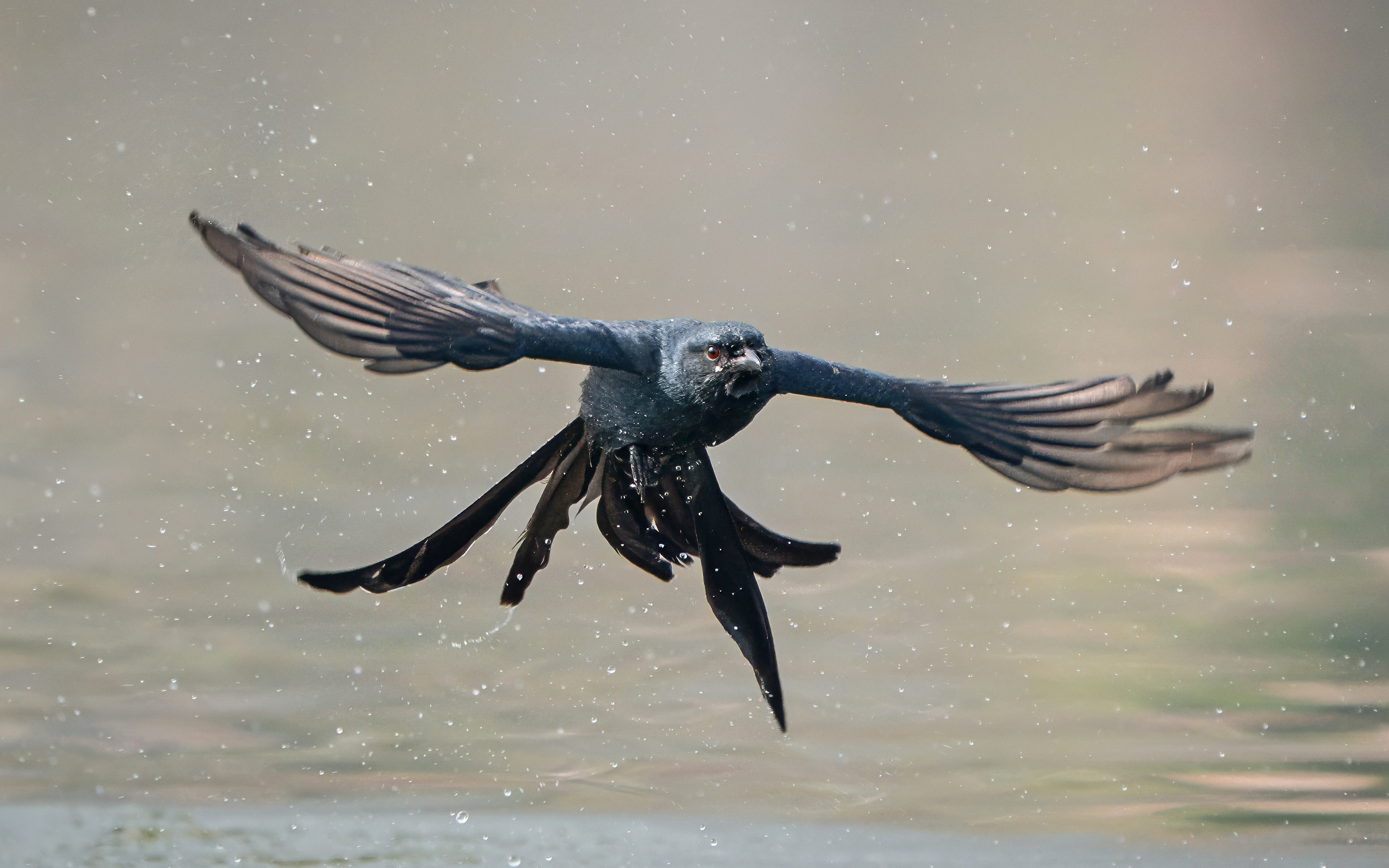
Black drongo, one of many species known to gather in Jatinga

At the end of the monsoon season (between September and November), especially on moonless and foggy nights between 6 p.m. and 9:30 p.m , birds are known to descend to the ground. Of the 250 avian species known to exist in the region, only 49 are known to engage in this behavior, with about a quarter of such species being either crepuscular or nocturnal. Affected species include tiger bittern, black bittern, little egret, pond heron, Indian pitta, kingfishers, hill partridge, green pigeon, emerald dove, necklaced laughingthrush, and black drongo. The birds are mostly young, either juveniles or sub-adults.

Theories abound as to why such deaths occur, most involving the artificial lights in the village. Anwaruddin Choudhury concluded that the birds are disturbed by high velocity winds at their roost. The disturbed birds then fly towards lights, seeking refuge; deaths occur when they are killed or injured by locals. Another theory is that the birds rely on the moon for guidance while migrating; on moonless nights, common in Jatinga in autumn, they mistakenly follow artificial lights, again bringing them to their doom. Still another theory, similar to Choudhury's, is that the birds become disoriented from the high altitude and high speed winds, combined with the widespread fog.

There is a belief by some that the birds are committing suicide, which is often repeated in media coverage of Jatinga. This, however, is a misnomer, as the birds don't seem to intentionally kill themselves; indeed, many will settle themselves in trees or bushes until reoriented, and the so-called "suicides" never occur during the day, whereas a truly sucidal animal would likely attempt regardless of time of day. Additionally, when birds captured at Jatinga are given a warm place to recover, they typically regain their strength and ability to fly within hours.

The earliest known observation of the phenomenon was in 1885, when a group of Naga farmers traveling through the area observed birds being attracted to their campfire. E. P. Gee brought this phenomenon to global attention in the 1960s, after exploring Jatinga with Salim Ali.

=== Killing of birds by locals ===
When birds fall to the ground at Jatinga, they are often attacked by the local humans, who kill the dazed animals with bamboo poles. Some people may bring along torches or other artificial light sources to intentionally disorient the birds. The attackers are mainly youths. This is a major cause of bird deaths in the area, and many researchers have deemed the idea that the birds cause their own deaths a myth, with the humans instead being the direct cause.

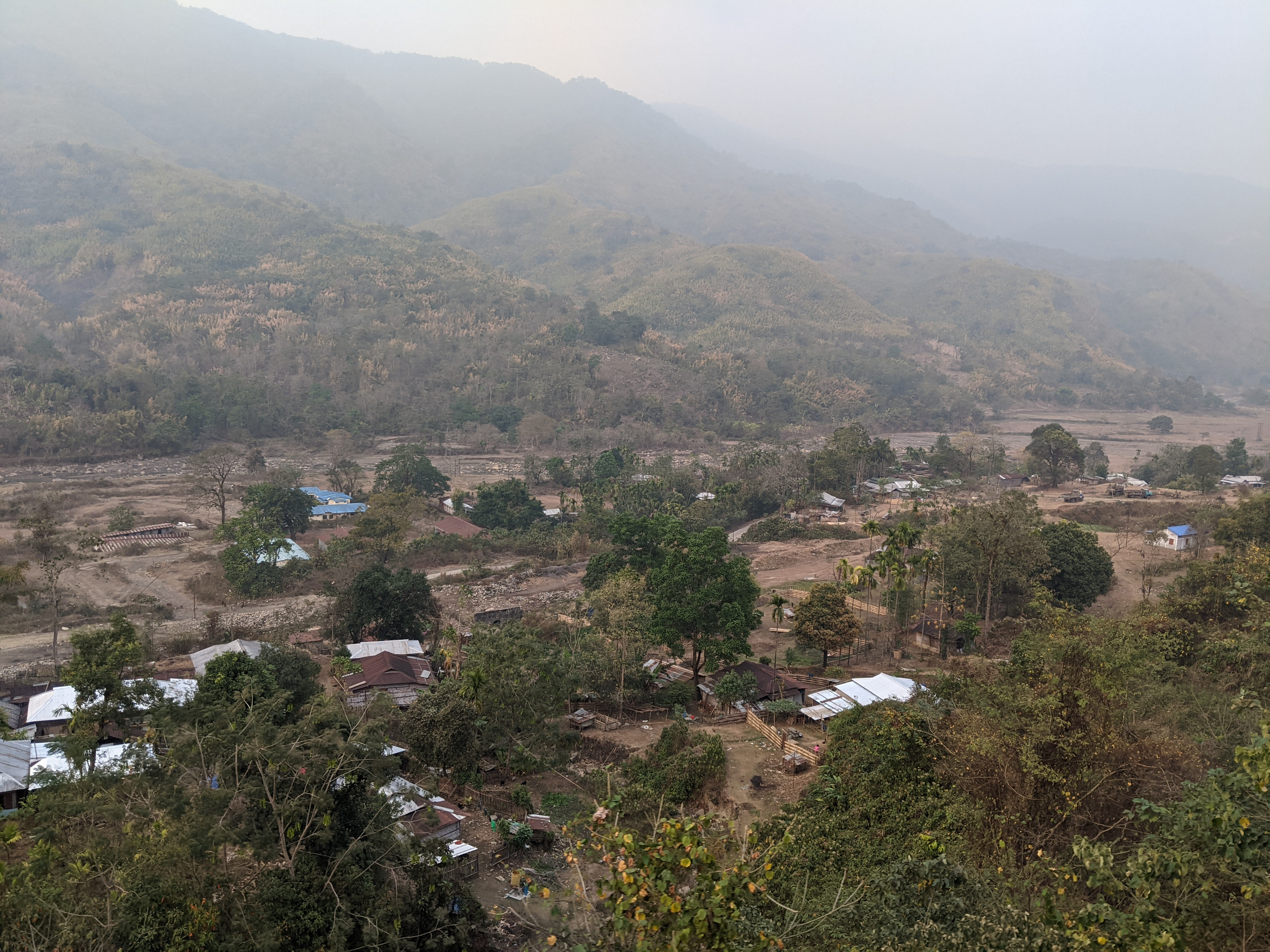
Overhead view of houses in Jatinga

Conservation groups and wildlife officials in India have taken steps to prevent wanton killing of birds across India. Bikash Brahma, Additional Principal Chief Conservator of Forests of Dima Hasao, stated the killings as well as the number of birds arriving at the village has been declining gradually since the last few years. Much of this is due to habitat loss. As most of the birds are killed for human consumption, conservationists have encouraged pig farming, a longtime tradition in the area, as a source of meat instead.

Despite the threat to the bird population, bird harvests can sometimes aid with scientific discoveries. For example, the white winged wood duck has only been observed once in Jatinga, and this is known because a specimen was obtained from a local who had killed it during a nighttime bird-killing session.

== Popular culture ==
The bird deaths inspired a book of poetry, In Love With Jatinga, by Tapati Baruah Kashyap. While half of the poems are about the bird deaths, Kashyap explained: "Jatinga is not about birds alone. It has lovely people, lovely oranges and pineapples, and breath-taking natural scenery all around".

The title of the film Jatinga Ityadi is in reference to the bird death phenomenon. The film, as explained by director Sanjeeb Sabhapandit, is about how "in the guise of a revolution, the boys are drawn into a death trap". Sanjeeb noted that while the popular narrative of Jatinga is that the birds are committing suicide, the reality is that they are being killed by youths when they land. The title was thus chosen to draw a comparison between the birds and the characters.

Outside of India, the area and its bird deaths were discussed in a 2021 episode of the American Atlas Obscura podcast.

== See also ==
- Dima Hasao district
- Haflong
- Maibang
- Panimur
- Tourism in Assam
