= List of dams and reservoirs in Assam =

The following are the dams and reservoirs located in Assam:

River	Dam	Height	Length	Type	Storage capacity	Reservoir area	Complete
Pagladiya River	Pagladia	26.2 m (86 ft)	230 m (755 ft)	Rock-fill			Under Construction
Kopili	Khandong	66 m (217 ft)	243 m (797 ft)	Gravity			Completed
Umrong Nalah	Umrong	30 m (98 ft)	143 m (469 ft)	Gravity			Completed
Subansiri	Subansiri Lower Dam	130 m (427 ft)	284 m (932 ft)	Gravity	1.365 km^{3} (1,106,624 acre⋅ft)	33.5 km^{2} (8,278 acres)	Under Construction
Karbi Langpi River	Karbi Langpi Dam	35 m (115 ft)	197 m (646 ft)	Gravity			Completed
