= Falcon Festival =

Annual ethnic festival in Assam, India

Falcon Festival Amur Falcon Festival
- Status: Active
- Genre: Folk, Modern
- Begins: 11 December 2026
- Ends: 13 December 2026
- Frequency: Annually
- Venue: Umrangso Golf ground
- Locations: Umrangso, Dima Hasao, Assam
- Coordinates: 25.484°N 92.693°E
- Country: India
- Years active: 11
- Inaugurated: 31 October 2015
- Founder: Blue Hills Society, Wildlife Trust of India, and CAF (India)
- Previous event: 2025
- Next event: 2026
- Major events: Contest in Singing & Dancing (Traditional & Modern form), Pageant, Musics Festivals, Cultural showcase, Exhibitions, Camping, Dirt racing etc.
- Patron: DHAC
- Sponsor: Public donation, DHAC

Falcon Festival is an annual festival celebrated in Umrangso, Dima Hasao district in the Northeast Indian state of Assam. The Festival is held to bring conservation awareness to the migratory bird, Amur falcon, that visit the region during the month of October–November every year. The festival is usually held after the birds has left the region.

== Origin ==
The primary aim of the festival was raising awareness about conservation of migratory bird Amur falcon. The first edition was held for two days from 31 October to 1 November 2015 at Karbi Club ground, Umrangso, in association with Blue Hills Society, Wildlife Trust of India and Charities Aid Foundation-India.

=== Objective ===
The main objective of the festival is wildlife conservation and cultural celebration. The festival is one among the similar festival celebrated in Northeastern India for conservation of Amur falcon. Similar festivals are celebrated in other Northeastern state like in Nagaland, Meghalaya, Manipur. It holds the distinction of being the first to spearhead awareness about Amur Falcon in the region.

=== Amur falcon ===
Amur falcon is a small migratory bird that travel between South-Africa and East-China (breeding ground). It reach and rest in Northeastern India during its long journey. It's known for its incredible 22,000 KM journey. The birds primarily feed on insects during their migration. They face threats like habitat loss and hunting. Conservation efforts are underway to protect them.

== Celebration ==
The event celebration last for three days. The first day with various outdoor games, including traditional and modern. Second day, various competitions like beauty pageant are held. Music festival are usually held on each night. The festival also showcase various traditional artifact, tribal culture and traditions.

== Location ==
=== Karbi Club ===
From 2015 to 2016, the first two editions of the festival was held at 'Karbi Club ground', Umrangso, Dima Hasao.

=== Umrangso Golf Course ===
Since 2017, Umrangso Golf field has been hosting Falcon festivals annually. It is a plateau flood bed of NEEPCO dam. It consists of several plateau hills, some of which become islet during monsoon (when flooded). The location is also popular for camping, trekking, boating, Water skiing etc.

== Incidents ==
In 2017, a person was found unconscious and died during treatment.

In 2018, after the end of its 4th edition, a person was found dead in the water reservoir of NEEPCO, police say, the deceased person was highly inebriated the previous night. There is an adequate lack of water safety at the festival location.

In 2023, during its 9th edition, spectators were charged hefty price for entry. On its last day, spectators illegally entered the music festival, they were later allowed free entry. The arrival of huge crowd were partly due to presence of international DJ Mari Ferrari, as well various band.

== See also ==
- Umrangso
