= Panimur =

- Tourist Destination
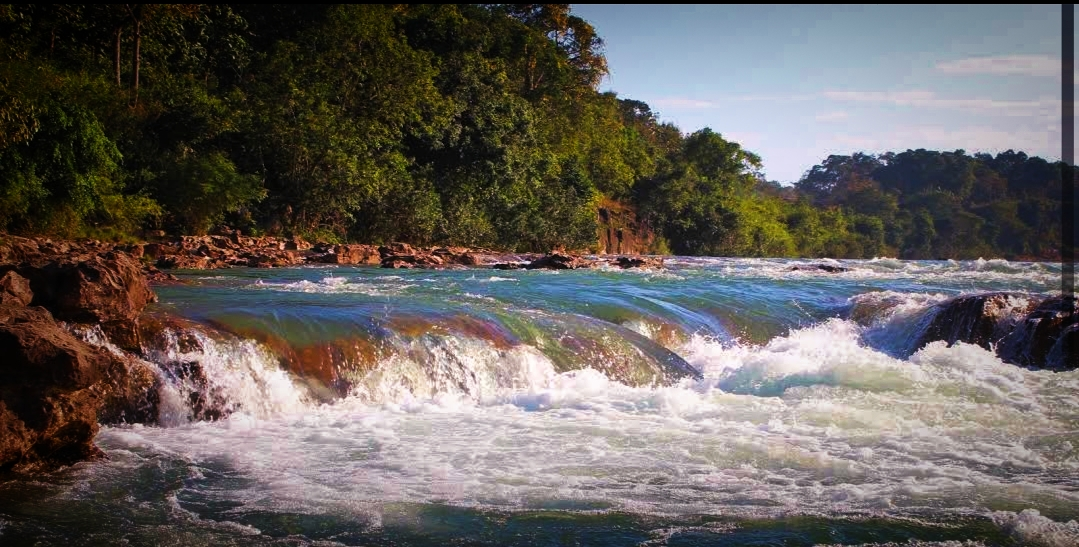
- Panimur Waterfall on the Kopili River

- Location in Assam, India Panimur (India)
- Coordinates: 25°43′00″N 92°49′24″E
- District: Dima Hasao
- State: Assam
- Country: India
- Time zone: UTC+5:30 (IST)
- PIN: 788819
- Website: dimahasao.assam.gov.in/tourist-place-detail/271

Panimur is a scenic destination in the Dima Hasao district of Assam, India. It is most famous for the Panimur Waterfall, also known as Niagara of Northeast, which forms from the Kopili River as it flows over rocky terrain, creating a wide, cascading waterfall that is a major attraction for tourists and photographers.

== Geography ==
Located about 120 kilometres (75 mi) from Haflong, the district headquarters of Dima Hasao, Panimur features a hilly landscape as part of the Barail range. This area has a unique climate and is rich in diverse flora and fauna. The Panimur Waterfall is formed as the Kopili River flows over rocky formations, creating a milky white cascade, especially during autumn when the water flow is at its peak.

== Tourism ==
The place is a popular destination, especially in winter and spring, offering scenic views, sightseeing, and picnicking. Visitors can also enjoy activities like mountain river crossing, waterfall rappelling, water rafting, and night trekking, making it ideal for both relaxation and adventure.

== Transportation ==
Public transportation options are limited. therefore, renting a car or bike is the only option for flexibility and ease of travel.

=== Road ===
The place has no transportation hub. The place is accessible via several routes, making it a convenient destination for travelers. The nearest major town is Lumding (73km). Visitors can reach Panimur by road via NH-27 from Lanka (38km), and via National Highway 627 from Haflong (120km).

=== Railway ===
The nearest Railway station to Panimur is Lanka Railway station, located in the Hojai district, approximately 38 kilometres (24 mi) away, and serves as a vital and the nearest transportation hub for the place. It offers connectivity to major cities in Assam. Other nearby railway station are at Hojai, Lumding Junction and New Haflong, 51km, 73km and 120km respectively. From Lumding junction travelers can hire private vehicles to reach Panimur.

== See also ==
- Umrangso
