= Saron, Mahur =

Village in Dima Hasao, Assam, India

Saron
- Village
- Country: India
- State: Assam
- District: Dima Hasao
- Community Development Block: Mahur ITDP

Area
  - Total: 5.37 km^{2} (2.07 sq mi)

Population (2011)
  - Total: 1,494
  - Density: 278/km^{2} (721/sq mi)

Languages
  - Official: English, Hindi, Hmar language
- Time zone: UTC+5:30 (IST)
- PIN: 788830
- ISO 3166 code: IN-AS
- Vehicle registration: AS 08

Saron is a Hmar village in Dima Hasao district, Mahur, Assam. As per the 2011 Census of India, the village has a population of 1,494 residents living in, 255 households, including 767 males and 727 females, with an overall literacy rate of approximately 93.1 percent.
