= Sambhudhan Phonglo =

Indian fighter

- Born: 16 March 1850; Longkhor, Assam, British India
- Died: 12 February 1883 (aged 32); Cachar district, India
- Cause of death: Killed by British Regime
- Known for: Armed resistance against the British Raj

Sambhudhan Phonglo (16 March 1850 – 12 February 1883), also known as Veer Sengya Sambudhan Phonglo, was an Indian independent freedom fighter who fought against British colonial power in Assam.

== Early life ==
Sambhudhan Phonglo was born in Longkhor near Maibang in the [erstwhile North Cachar Hills] of what is today the Dima Hasao District. He was born reportedly on the Falgoon of Indian almanac. His father was Deprondao Phonglo and mother Khasaidi Phonglo. they had four younger brothers: Umakant, Ramakant, Ramcharan (alias Ramren) and Haisholong.

Sambhudhan Phonglo spent his childhood at Longkhor, later moving over to Gonjung. Afterwards, he moved to Saupra, a small village near Nanadisa. As a young man, he moved to Semdikhor, near Mahur, where he married Nasadi. Sambhudhan Phonglo was reportedly tall, of fair complexion, with black eyes and large ears.

== Opposition to British ==
In 1832, the British took control of Southern Cachar, and in 1854 Northern Cachar. Instead of combining the two territories, they annexed them to the district of Nagaon. The territory was then placed under the charge of a Junior Political Officer with headquarters at Asalu. In 1866, the territory was distributed between the districts of Nagaon and Naga Hills. Thus, while parts of the Diyung Valley and the Kopili Valley had been given to the district of Nowgong, a large portion was joined with the newly created district of Naga Hills. The rest formed the territory of the North Cachar Hills comprising exclusively the hilly region.

Phonglo opposed these moves. He felt that the British had no right to rule the people of Assam and that the territorial moves were intended to weaken them. Phonglo took the view that if the native people were going to lose freedom, then shouldn't they help the foreign power in consolidating its position. To lose freedom was to embrace slavery. It would not be worthwhile for them to live under the aliens as slaves, as hardships could be endured, but not slavery.

== Insurrection ==
Phonglo decided to foment a rebellion against the British. He toured extensively in the North Cachar Hills, encouraging mass resistance, making contacts, and organizing followers. He was able to recruit a large number of youths to form a revolutionary force. Phonglo appointed Man Singh as his Principal Adviser and Molongthong a Subordinate Commander.

Phonglo started training his insurgents in Maibang. Villagers voluntarily rendered their services to the training center. Recruits were brought to Maibang in batches of thirty to forty.
