= Haflong Hindi =

Lingua franca pidgin of Dima Hasao district, Assam, India

- Region: Dima Hasao district, Assam
- Native speakers: None
- Language family: Hindi-based pidgin

Language codes
- ISO 639-3: None (mis)
- Glottolog: None

Haflong Hindi (Hindi: हफ़लौंग हिन्दी) is the lingua franca of Dima Hasao district of Assam state of India. It is a pidgin that stemmed from Hindi and includes vocabulary from several other languages, such as Assamese, Dimasa and Zeme Naga. It is named after Haflong, which is the headquarters of Dima Hasao district (North Cachar Hills).

== Example phrases ==
The dialect is largely intelligible to Hindi speakers, and features simplified grammar with loanword infusions.

Phrase	Modern Standard Hindi equivalent	English glosses	Meaning
hum tumko modot korne nahi sekega	मैं तुमको मदद कर नहीं सकूँगा/सकूँगी	I (hum) you (tumko) help (modot) can't (nahi sekega)	'I can't help you.'
tumra kuttaa se humko kamraayaa	तुम्हारे कुत्ते ने मुझे काटा	Your (tumra) dog (kuttaa) me (humko) bit (kamraayaa)	'Your dog bit me.'
tum kaha jaigah	तुम कहाँ जाओगे	Where (kaha) you (tum) go (jaigah)	'Where will you go?'

In contrast to printed forms of Hindi, the Haflong variety lacks person and number agreement in the verb and ergative marking of the subject when transitive clauses are in a preterite or perfect tense.
