= Dima Hasao Autonomous Council =

Autonomous district council in Assam, India

North Cachar Hills Autonomous Council

Type
- Type: Autonomous District Council

Leadership
- Chairperson: Mohet Hojai, Bharatiya Janata Party
- Chief Executive Member: Debolal Gorlosa, Bharatiya Janata Party

Structure
- Seats: 30 Councillors (28 Elected + 2 Nominated)
- Political groups: Government (25): BJP (25); Others (3): IND (3); Nominated (2): NOM (2)

Elections
- Voting system: 28 plurality voting 2 nominated
- Last election: 8 January 2024
- Next election: January 2029

Meeting place
- Haflong, Assam

Website
- nchac.in

The North Cachar Hills Autonomous Council (NCHAC), also known as the Dima Hasao Autonomous Council, is an autonomous district council in the state of Assam in India. It was constituted under the provisions of the Sixth Schedule of the Constitution of India to administer the Dima Hasao district and to develop the hill people in the area. Its headquarters is in Haflong, Dima Hasao district.

The council has 30 members of whom 28 are elected by the first past the post system and 2 are nominated by the state government of Assam. It is led by a Chief Executive Member, currently Debolal Gorlosa.

== History ==
The North Cachar Hills Autonomous District Council was created on April 29, 1952, under Article 244(2) of the Sixth Schedule to the Constitution of India. Later it was recognized as an autonomous council. In 2010, the name of the Council was changed to Dima Hasao Autonomous Council.

== Current members ==
Constituencies under Dima Hasao Autonomous Council and their members as of the 2024 election:

Chief Executive Councillor: Mohet Hojai
#	Constituency	Councillor	Party	Remarks
1	Haflong	Donpainon Thaosen	Bharatiya Janata Party	
2	Jatinga	Fleming Rupshi Shylla	Bharatiya Janata Party	
3	Borail	Ngulminlal Lienthang	Bharatiya Janata Party	
4	Mahur	Probita Jahari	Bharatiya Janata Party	
5	Jinam	Zosumthang Hmar	Bharatiya Janata Party	
6	Hangrum	Noah Diame	Bharatiya Janata Party	
7	Laisong	Paudamming Nriame	Bharatiya Janata Party	
8	Dautohaja	Pronath Rajiyung	Bharatiya Janata Party	
9	Maibang East	Monjoy Langthasa	Bharatiya Janata Party	
10	Maibang West	Mohet Hojai	Bharatiya Janata Party	
11	Kalachand	Ratan Jarambusa	Bharatiya Janata Party	
12	Wajao	Biswajit Daulagupu	Bharatiya Janata Party	
13	Hajadisa	Projith Hojai	Bharatiya Janata Party	
14	Langting	Dhriti Thaosen	Bharatiya Janata Party	
15	Hatikhali	Niranjan Hojai	Bharatiya Janata Party	
16	Diyungbra	Rupali Langthasa	Bharatiya Janata Party	
17	Garampani	Samsing Engti	Bharatiya Janata Party	
18	Kharthong	Lalremsiama Darnei	Bharatiya Janata Party	
19	Dehangi	Debolal Gorlosa	Bharatiya Janata Party	
20	Gunjung	Nojit Kemprai	Bharatiya Janata Party	
21	Hadingma	Devojit Bathari	Bharatiya Janata Party	
22	Dihamlao	Ramgalungbe Jeme	Independent	
23	Harangajao	Amendu Hojai	Bharatiya Janata Party	
24	Hamri	Monjit Naiding	Bharatiya Janata Party	
25	Lower Kharthong	Ngamrothang Hmar	Bharatiya Janata Party	
26	Dolong	John Phoithong	Independent	
27	Diger	Hen Samuel Changsan	Bharatiya Janata Party	
28	Semkhor	Herojit Jidung	Independent	
29	Nominated	TBD	Nominated	
30	Nominated	TBD	Nominated	

== See also ==
- Moran Autonomous Council
- Hill tribes of Northeast India
- North Eastern Council
