= Digaru River =

River in Meghalaya, India

Digaru, also known as Umtrew, is a river originating in the Garo-Khasi hills of Meghalaya state in India, flowing towards the northeast and then meeting the Kopili river and then merging with the Brahmaputra river. The name Digaru originated from a Kachari/Mech word 'Di' which means water and 'Garo' means the people living in the Garo hills. Hence Digaru literally means "water of the Garo". This River is known as Umtru River in Meghalaya. There are 3 dams are constructed across this river namely, Umtru Dam, Kyrdemkulai (Umiam st-III) Dam & Nongkhyllem Dam at Ri Bhoi district for hydroelectric power generation.
