= CSM Technologies Limited =

Indian information technology company

- Formerly: Cybertech Software & Multimedia Pvt Ltd (1998–2014); CSM Technologies Pvt Ltd (2014–2025)
- Type: Public
- Traded as: NSE: CSMTECH; BSE: TBD/ TBD
- Industry: Information technology
- Founded: 1998
- Headquarters: Bhubaneswar, Odisha, India
- Key people: Priyadarshi Pany (MD and CEO)
- Revenue: ₹228.72 crore (total income, FY2026)
- Net income: ₹24.01 crore (FY2026)
- Subsidiaries: CSM Tech Limited (Kenya)
- Website: www.csm.tech

CSM Technologies Limited is an Indian information technology company headquartered in Bhubaneswar, Odisha. It develops e-governance and other software platforms for government agencies and businesses. The company is listed on the Bombay Stock Exchange (BSE) and the National Stock Exchange (NSE).

Its projects include the Integrated Mines and Minerals Management System (i3MS) for the Government of Odisha and a mineral royalty management system for the Government of Kenya.

== History ==
The company was incorporated in 1998 as Cybertech Software & Multimedia Pvt Ltd. In 2014 it was renamed CSM Technologies Pvt Ltd and in 2025 it became a public limited company.

The company was founded by Priyadarshi Pany. The company currently operating 20 cities in 14 countries.

== Projects ==
=== Integrated Mines and Minerals Management System (Odisha) ===
CMS developed The Integrated Mines and Minerals Management System (i3MS), a software system that used by the Government of Odisha to regulate illegal mining and the transport of minerals. It was set up after illegal mining in the state was investigated by the Justice M. B. Shah Commission, which the central government established in 2010.

The system was became fully operational in 2014. It checks a mine lessee's environmental, forest and pollution clearances and lease validity before a transit permit is issued. It then issues bar coded e passes for individual trucks. And truckloads are recorded at electronic weighbridges at mines, railway sidings, ports and buyers' premises. Registered trucks are tracked by GPS, and the system raises an alert when a loaded truck leaves its approved route.

=== Royalty Management System (Kenya) ===
According to Business Standard report in October 2026 that the company had developed a nationwide Royalty Management System for Kenya's State Department for Mining.

== Awards and recognition ==
- In 2023, CSM Technologies received the Technology Excellence Award in the Tech Innovation for Business category at the 8th Tech for Excellence Awards, organised by ASSOCHAM and the Government of West Bengal.
- In 2026, CSM Technologies received the Excellence in GovTech award at the NASSCOM SME Inspire Awards.
