= Mining scams in India =

Mining scams in India (colloquially known as the Indian mining scam) refer to a series of alleged widespread scams in various ore-rich states of India, which have generated controversy. Problems caused by the alleged scams include encroachment of forest areas, underpayment of government royalties, and conflict with tribals regarding land rights. The spill-over of the effects of legal mining into issues such as Naxalism, and the distortion of the Indian political system by mixed politics and mining interests, has gained international attention.

The latest scam that has come out is the coal mining scam in which the government has had a presumable conservative loss of Rs 1.86 trillion (short scale), due to the delayed implementation of a competitive bidding process for allotment of coal blocks, according to the Comptroller and Auditor General of India (CAG).

== Illegal iron ore mining in Karnataka ==
Rising global iron-ore prices driven by Chinese demand brought focus to the iron ore-rich Bellary region of Karnataka. This iron ore is alleged to have been illegally mined after paying a minuscule royalty to the government. The major irregularities involve mines in Bellary, including mines belonging to the Obulapuram Mining Company owned by G. Karunakara Reddy and G. Janardhana Reddy Sajjala Diwakar who were ministers in the Government of Karnataka and Andhra Pradesh at the time.

=== Investigation by Income Tax Department ===
Income tax sleuths unearthed under-invoicing and tax evasion of around Rs 86 crore by the Obulapuram Mining Company (OMC), run by Karnataka's Reddy brothers and also their trusted confidante and state health minister B Sriramulu. A team headed by the Additional Commissioner of Income Tax, consisting of around 150 Income tax Investigation officials and companies of Central Reserve Police Force conducted raids on the premises of over 10 people. Income tax officials described it as one of the biggest IT raids in the recent history. The investigation found massive tax evasion and money laundering which prompted mass panic amongst the then-BJP government in Karnataka. Officials found that the one-dollar company, GLA Trading International (GLATI), was established on 30 November 2007, with Janardhana Reddy as one of its directors. GLA, presumed to be named after Janardhana Reddy's wife Gali Laxmi Aruna, has offices in Singapore, Dubai and the British Virgin Islands, which is a 'tax haven'. The investigation report stated that "OMC's transactions through the MoU with GLATI are convoluted and devised to evade tax payment in India," A comparative study of shipping bills for export with other companies, which are exporting the same grade material, confirmed the malpractice by OMC. According to the report, OMC signed the MoU with GLATI to sell iron ore only to evade tax payment in India. When the Commissioner summoned Janardhana Reddy and sought an explanation from OMC, the Reddys claimed it suppressed sales in order to develop stronger relationship worldwide with global buyers through GLATI for the sake of financial stability against price fluctuations. This report was billed as the best investigation of the year and recorded in the book Let us Share by the Finance Ministry. This report was the basis of the Central Bureau of Investigation investigation and the Santhosh Hegde Report.

=== Interim Lokayukta report of December 2008 ===
A report published by the Lok Ayukta uncovered major violations and systemic corruption in mining in Bellary, including in the allowed geography, encroachment of forest land, massive underpayment of state mining royalties relative to the market price of iron ore and systematic starvation of government mining entities. Justice N. Santosh Hegde resigned from the Lokayukta position on 23 June 2010, citing the inability to be effective in his anti-corruption mandate owing to the non-cooperative Government of Karnataka. In January 2010, Mr Kharge questioned the government about transfer of Dileep Kumar, the PCCF who refused to sign the report, but Government instead brought in S Nagaraja as PCCF who signed the report.

=== Collusion of officials and politicians in permitting illegal mining ===
Environment Ministry officials state that the 49.97 lakh tonnes of sand mining reported in the Indian Bureau of Mines Year Book for 2011 is a gross underestimate. The guidelines under the Central and the state enactments call for a sketch of the mining area when a mining lease is applied for. It was found by the Lokayukta that sometimes the actual mining areas are not related to the sketch given with the applications, without officials crosschecking them. Furthermore, mining applicants falsely claim a prohibited forest area as a revenue area. Finally, the actual area of the mine is much bigger than the claimed area. The Indian Bureau of Mines rules, which control the type of mining, allow a maximum mining depth six metres to prevent environmental degradation, but miners have flouted this rule to over-extract iron-ore. For example, if they are allowed to take 100 metric tonnes, mines take 1,000 metric tonnes. Officials at road check posts reportedly collude in a massive under-counting of lorries and trucks transporting the iron-ore from the Bellary mines to the ports. News reports suggest that only 200 trucks are reported instead of 4000 passing through every day.

=== Underpayment of royalties to state ===
There is a huge difference in the market price of the ore and the royalty specified by the government as well as faulty measurement mechanisms of amount of ore extracted. It was found that 3.5 million tonnes of ore were illegally exported without paying a rupee of royalty to the exchequer, resulting in a loss of about Rs 160.85 billion. With ore prices of US$100–120 per ton, 3.5 million tonnes adds up to about 350–420 million USD. There are proposals to link the royalties to the market price of iron-ore. There is also a proposal by the ministry of Environment and Forests to levy a tax.

=== Environmental damage ===
According to the Lok Ayukta Report, there have been severe ecological changes due to illegal mining. The entire system of rain has changed in the district of Bellary. It is reported that the entire area surrounding the mining area is denuded of greenery and has no agricultural activity. Certain species of animals, like the sloth bear, have disappeared in the Bellary region, and medicinal plants from the area do not grow any more.

=== Belekeri port scandal ===
Related is the Belekeri port scam, where illegally mined ore which had been seized was surreptitiously exported from the port. Karnataka Chief Minister Yeddyurappa admitted to an illegal iron-ore export racket at Belekeri Port involving 3,500,000 tonnes of iron ore.

=== Related road damage, accidents and loss of lives ===
The lack of effective regulation in the mining and transport of iron ore has adversely impacted road safety. Overloaded trucks carrying ore have caused hundreds of fatal accidents on the roadways leading to ports such as Belekeri and damaged national highways in the region.

=== Recommendation to ban iron-ore exports ===
The Indian government's Ministry of Steel and Ministry of Law & Justice are considering a ban on exports of iron ore and limiting mining only to captive iron and steel production units. This has been opposed by the mining ministry, citing massive loss of employment.

=== Lokayukta Report of July 2011 ===
The Lokayukta Report on illegal mining in Karnataka details the methods in which miners, government officials and ministers colluded to defraud the government of mining revenues. The report details the complete breakdown of democratic governance in the bellary area and uncovers the "zero risk system", a protection and extortion racket masterminded by G. Janardhana Reddy. The report describes the illegal money transfers to foreign companies and tax shelters by mining entities such as Obulapuram Mining Company, Associated Mining Company, GLA Trading and GJR Holdings owned by the Reddy Brothers. The report also describes the illegal mining, bureaucrats-politicians-businessman nexus. Even banks and public sector companies also participated in the theft. There are more than 100 names involved in the illegal operation, including NMDC and JSW Steel. Charges against these companies include illegal movement of iron ore from mining yard without permits and without paying royalties, forest encroachment, mining lease violations, overloading of trucks and sandry violations. The iron ore was illegally exported to China through ports of southern India and payment is made through more than 4000 bank accounts. The damage to environment cannot be calculated.

== Illegal mining in the Aravali Range ==
Illegal mining activity has been reported in the Aravali Range.

== Bauxite, iron ore, chromite and coal mining in Orissa ==
2011 witnessed first set of PIL's filed in Orissa High Court seeking explanation on why royalty had not been revised since 1948. During process of inquiry, by September 2011, Orissa High Court had come across multiple other breaches. Findings led to three inquiry sets (by centralized agencies, by CAG and proceedings on a set of PIL's filed at Supreme Court of India) which emerged after September 2011 findings by Orissa High Court. Despite multiple transfer of judges and chief justices from Orissa High Court during the ongoing hearings, the first set of hearing by Court was completed in record-time.

The quantity of ore that is to be extracted every year specified in the mining plan which is approved by IBM. Forest and environment laws have been violated installing screening plants without statutory clearance. No action has been taken by any of department state and center excess mining of the specified limit violating operating conditions, assessing impact on the local environment, grabbing unauthorised forest land. There have been four PILs in the Orissa HC demanding a CBI probe into the scam. Though the Union Mines Ministry has expressed its readiness for a CBI probe into the matter citing the report of Indian Bureau of Mines, the state government is vehemently opposing it. The Bureau had found considerable illegal mining of manganese and iron ore in Keonjhar district. The state government, which has appointed senior Supreme Court advocate Mukul Rohtagi to plead for it in the High Court, has been opposing the pleas made by several petitioners for CBI probe into the mining scam.

The state government has suspended 128 mining leases for various minerals, including iron ore, manganese, chromites, limestone, while 482 licenses granted for trading and storage of minerals have been cancelled to stop illegal mining. The Justice M B Shah Commission probing the state's mining scam will need to unearth more before it can bring out a report. Though it had been expected to submit its report by the end of December, complaints from miners over allegedly misleading evidence given by the state government have now delayed that. During a recent meeting with commission members, the miners alleged that steel and mines department officials had superimposed Google maps on the revenue map to determine lease area encroachment. Also, they said, differential global positioning system (DGPS) maps given by the Orissa Space Application Centre were erroneous. The commission has directed the state to form a committee for physical survey and lease area demarcation of mines. With so much to do, even Justice Shah has expressed doubt if the commission can meet its July deadline Coal mining has run into trouble as well in Angul district over land issues. Ninety-four of the 192 iron ore mining leases in Odisha do not have the mandatory environmental clearances. And of the 96 that have them, 75 have mined far beyond their permitted levels over the past several years, says the Justice M.B. Shah Commission report.

The Hindu has accessed parts of the report on illegal iron ore and manganese mining, which is yet to be tabled in Parliament. It is the last one from the Justice Shah Commission. The exhaustive five-volume report lays bare how the mines have continued to use a loophole in the law for years and flagrantly violate environmental and other norms to pump out iron at a time when international prices of the metal are booming. The report is to be considered by the Cabinet before it is tabled in the next session of Parliament. The report says 56 mining leases operated close to identified wildlife areas without adequate protection to the animals. The mandatory forest clearances had not been obtained in several cases. Waterbodies in and around 55 mines have been polluted. Water has depleted in natural streams in some cases and forestland impacted adversely in several others. A mining-project within a 10-kilometre vicinity of a protected wildlife area requires mandatory clearance from the National Board of Wildlife, which too was not obtained in several cases. The Hindu contacted the offices of Union Minister for Mines and Minerals Dinsha Patel and Environment and Forests Minister Veerappa Moily for comments on the report, but neither returned the calls.

The Shah Commission held both the Central government authorities and the Odisha government responsible for the wide-ranging illegal mining that has continued unchecked for years. It has recommended that the entire extraction in all cases, where leases are operated without mandatory environmental clearances, be treated as illegal and the market value – domestic or export – recovered from the defaulting miners. The commission's earlier reports on Goa and Karnataka had brought to light rampant corruption and illegal mining and export in both States and put the Central government as well as State officials in the dock. In the Odisha report too, the Commission said action must be taken against State and Central government officers who allowed the illegal mining for years in violation of various laws. The commission, which has been told to wind up before it reports on illegal mining in Chhattisgarh, has warned that there was an absolute lack of monitoring in Odisha and miners were fearlessly violating provisions of the law as if they did not exist. It also warned that the practice of merely asking violators to plant more trees than was normally required is not a legitimate alternative to prosecution under the penal provisions of the Forest Conservation Act which attract punishment that includes imprisonment. This practice – which has no legal backing – has rendered the Act toothless and ineffective. The Central Government has been asked by the Supreme Court to submit the Justice Shah Commission report on illegal mining in Odisha and Jharkhand to it by 27 January.

A green bench headed by Justice A K Patnaik also directed the government to provide a copy of the reports to Central Empowered Committee. The bench passed the order after advocate Prashant Bhushan, appearing for petitioners, alleged that contents of the report, published in newspapers, are shocking and the apex court should analyse them. The Central Government had appointed Justice M.B. Shah as the head of a one-man panel in November, 2010. Justice Shah was supposed to submit the final report within 18 months of the commission's first sitting on 17 January 2011. It was required to submit the final report on or before 16 July 2012. However, the Union Cabinet had in July, 2012 decided to give it a one-year extension, given the voluminous data the commission had to collect and compile on mining from seven states-Odisha, Jharkhand, Chhattisgarh, Karnataka, Goa and Madhya Pradesh. In the month of October last year, Justice M B Shah had submitted his third and final report, which was mainly on the mining mafia menace in Goa. The report is expected to prove crucial as it dwells upon the financial transactions and losses through illegal mining from 2006 to 2011. The commission has undertaken a thorough probe into the bank transactions of exporters, traders and mining lease owners to track down the exact financial transaction. The two interim reports submitted by the commission earlier had led the Supreme Court to impose a temporary ban on mining activities in Goa, the largest exporter of iron-ore in the country. Of the two reports, one was on illegal iron ore mining across the country, and the other was on illegal mining in Goa.

Prominent research into bauxite mining in Odisha includes the documentary Wira Pdika and Samarendra Das and Felix Padel, Out of This Earth: East India Adivasis and the Aluminium Cartel (New Delhi: Orient Black Swan, 2010).

== Iron ore mining in Madhya Pradesh ==
On 14 November 2011 person known as Rajendra Dixit registered a complaint at Madhya Pradesh Lokayukta Office against Indian National Congress MLA Sanjay Pathak's mining firms, demanding a Lokayukta probe against an alleged iron ore mining scam worth Rs. 50 billion allegedly committed at Sihora, Jabalpur. He also presented on record copy of the note-sheet which was said to be prepared at the orders of then CM Digvijay Singh on 24 June 2002 in which he allegedly ordered the upper secretary, Department of Forest to declare the forest land as revenue land to allow Pathak's mining firms perform iron ore Mining at the site.

== Sand mining in Madhya Pradesh ==
Due to the nature of the issue, illegal sand mining has been a contentious issue between the government and opposition in Madhya Pradesh. The opposition of the government of Madhya Pradesh, had written a letter to the Prime Minister of India and leveled serious charges against the relatives of Chief Minister of Madhya Pradesh, Shivraj Singh Chouhan.

== Illegal mining in Goa ==
The Shah Commission report on mining in Goa has accused both the state and the Union Ministry of Environment and Forests (MoEF) of allowing illegal mining in the state, putting the region's environment and ecology at risk. The commission, headed by Justice M B Shah, was set up by the Centre in 2010 to probe into the illegal mining across the country. About 55 per cent of the iron ore exported from India comes from Goa. The common illegalities the report points to are mining without licence, mining outside lease area and transporting minerals illegally. The Hon'ble Supreme Court however, in its order dated 21 April 2014 while making several directions to stem illegalities, also dismissed several allegations made in the Shah Commission Report. Indeed, it does appear that while there were several illegalities, sufficient jurisprudence was not exercised by the Shah Commission. Most notably, it neither conducted an exhaustive audit of the books of mining companies (as was subsequently initiated by the Government headed by Manohar Parrikar) nor gave an opportunity for any of the individuals & companies it made sweeping allegations against, to be heard. The Bombay High Court bench in Panaji 26.03.2013 directed the Goa government to file an FIR against over 150 people - including politicians, mine owners and bureaucrats - who have been indicted in the Justice M.B. Shah Commission report.

The order was issued by Bombay High Court Chief Justice Mohit Shah following a petition by an electricity department employee, Kashinath Shetye, who said that the Rs. 35,000 crore scam exposed by the judicial commission should be probed by police. Justice Shah directed the state government to "file an FIR (First Information Report) in respect of offences alleged to have been committed by persons responsible for illegal mining in the state of Goa, including the lessees of the mines and all those who permitted such illegal mining of iron ore and manganese ore, in contravention of the relevant statutory provisions". The chief justice said that the FIR had to be filed "within a period of six weeks".Shetye had first filed a complaint with the Crime Branch, which had not filed an FIR, forcing the petitioner to complain before the high court.

The M.B. Shah Commission report had exposed a Rs. 35,000 crore illegal mining scam, in which politicians, bureaucrats and mining companies were indicted. Mining in Goa has been banned for over five months now by the Supreme Court, which is hearing a petition filed by lawyer Prashant Bhushan and local environmental NGOs. Since October 2013, the Union Ministry of Environment and Forests (MoEF) prohibits mining within a kilometre of the boundary of national parks and wildlife sanctuariesin Goa.

On 21 April 2014, Supreme Court of India lifted the ban on mining in Goa and with a temporary annual cap of 20 million tonnes of iron ore excavation, which was 40 MT earlier.

Further, the Hon'ble Supreme Court of India also stayed the order of the Bombay High Court directing the filing of FIRs since investigation by the state government was already underway. It also stated that several conclusions drawn by the M B Shah Commission Report were incorrect, most notably, those on alleged illegality of leases granted in 1988 (to those who had filed the relevant applications in time and paid the prescribed fees/duties) and alleged "encroachment". The Justice Shah Commission Report had alleged 2,796 ha. of encroachment out of which about 578 ha. was for illegal extraction. However, the Goa Government in its affidavit pointed out several errors in what was termed as encroachment and close to 2,200 ha. of alleged encroachment were pertaining to dumping of overburden waste and of low-grade ore outside the lease area. This has been the subject of an expert-panel review constituted by the Supreme Court in its order dated 21 April 2014 and indeed, there are conflicting provisions in this regard (i.e., whether or not the 2,200 ha. pertaining to dumps are in fact "encroachment").

== Illegal sand mining in Tamil Nadu ==
Large scale illegal sand mining has been taking place in Tamil Nadu since the 1990s. Sand mining has been occurring indiscriminately in the riverbeds of many rivers flowing through the state such as the Cauvery, Palar, Vellar, Pennaiyar, Bhavani, etc. This has brought great damage to the riparian ecosystem, and has led to decreased percolation of water leading to loss of groundwater and drying up of wells. There are reports of widespread political involvement in the activity and a nexus between local politicians, bureaucrats, sand miners, police, and local governments. Sand mining is a lucrative source of revenue for political parties, and sand miners sway local opinion by paying money, funding local temples and funding infrastructure. Sand mining has been a major source of corruption in the state and has even led to violence and intimidation against and murders of activists, policemen, villagers, and journalists. Beach sand mining has led to major corruption scandals in the state, and illegal beach sand mining has led to illegal processing and export of radioactive minerals like monazite.

== Illegal sand mining in Andhra Pradesh ==
Large scale illegal sand mining has been occurring on the banks and the riverbed of the river Krishna with the involvement of local politicians. There have been reprisals against activists, journalists, local bureaucrats, and others working against sand mining in the form of violence and murders.

== Illegal mining in Assam ==
Illegal mining in Assam, particularly in the Dima Hasao district, involves mostly "rat-hole" mining. The practice involves digging narrow tunnels by hand to extract coal. In January 2025, miners became trapped in an illegal mine in the Dima Hasao district, prompting a government crackdown on illegal mines.

== Illegal mining and stone crushing in the Ganges river bed ==
Illegal mining in the Ganges river bed for stones and sand for construction work has long been a problem in the Haridwar district of Uttarakhand, where it touches the plains for the first time. This is despite the fact that quarrying has been banned in Kumbh Mela area zone covering 140 km^{2} area in Haridwar. On 14 June, Swami Nigamanada, a 34-year-old monk who was fasting since 19 February 2011 against illegal mining and stone crushing along the Ganges near Haridwar, died at the Himalayan Hospital in Jollygrant in Dehradun, after alleged poisoning by stone-crushing mafia. His death put spotlight on the activity including intervention by Union Environment minister.

== Union government commission to probe illegal mining ==
The mining ministry of the union government has announced a special commission to investigate the various cases of illegal mining in India. The union mining minister, B.K. Handique, announced that the investigation spanning Karnataka, Orissa and Jharkhand, will submit a report in 6 months. Almost two years after its ban, the Supreme Court on dt18.04.2013 allowed resumption of mining activities in 90 mines in Bellary, Tumkur and Chitradurga districts of Karnataka. A forest bench of Justices Aftab Alam, K S Radhakrishnan and Ranjan Gogoi allowed reopening of 27 category 'A' and 63 category 'B' mines, subject to conditions, including adherence of the reclamation and rehabilitation plans. However, the bench cancelled 49 leases of category 'C' mines, where maximum illegalities were reported, for "playing havoc with the national economy" and casting an "ominous cloud on the credibility of the system of governance by laws in force". Stating that the satellite images with respect to environmental damage and destruction by illegal mining had "shocked judicial conscience", the court said public interest would precede individual interest of these 49 category 'C' leaseholders and hence "complete closure" of these mines was warranted. The leases for iron ore mining had been categorised by the court-appointed central empowered committee as 'A', 'B' and 'C', based on the level of alleged illegalities. Of the 166 mining leases where operations were banned in 2011, the court suspended the leases for seven category 'B' mines on the Andhra Pradesh-Karnataka border.

== See also ==
- List of scandals in India
- Corruption in India
- 2011 Indian anti-corruption movement
- Jan Lokpal Bill
- Rent seeking
- 1992 Indian stock market scam
- NSE co-location scam
- 2G spectrum case
- Uttar Pradesh NRHM scam
- Justice AK Ganguly
- Right to Public Services legislation
- Corruption Perceptions Index
- Licence Raj
- Mafia Raj
- Concerns and controversies over the 2010 Commonwealth Games
- Lok Ayukta
- Socio-economic issues in India
- United Nations Convention against Corruption
- Durga Shakti Nagpal
- Coal mining in India
- Illegal mining
