= 2024 Dima Hasao Autonomous Council election =

- 8 January 2024

28 out of 30 seats in the Dima Hasao Autonomous Council 15 seats needed for a majority
- Turnout: 85.78%
| | Majority party |
|---|---|
| Party | BJP |
| Alliance | NDA |
| Seats before | 19 |
| Seats won | 25 |
| Seat change | ▲6 |
| Popular vote | 54,483 |
| | Third party |
| Party | Independents |
| Seats before | 6 |
| Seats won | 3 |
| Seat change | ▼3 |
- Structure of the Dima Hasao Autonomous Council after the election
Chief Executive Member before election
Debolal Gorlosa
BJP
Chief Executive Member after the election
Debolal Gorlosa
BJP

The Dima Hasao Autonomous Council election was held on 8 January 2024. The Dima Hasao Autonomous Council, earlier called North Cachar Hills District Council is an autonomous district in the Indian state of Assam.

== Background ==
A total of 1,41,124 voters, including 70,485 men and 70,639 women will be exercising their franchise in over 280 polling stations in the autonomous region. About 100 of these poling stations is marked as sensitive and 27 of them as very sensitive. Six candidates of the BJP have won uncontested. The day of polling i.e. 8 January was declared as a public holiday for Dima Hasao Council.

== Schedule ==
Assam State Election Commission has announced the election schedule for Dima Hasao Autonomous Council:

| Poll event | Date |
|---|---|
| Last date for making nominations | 21 December 2023 |
| Date on which poll shall, if necessary, be held | 8 January 2024 |
| Date on which repolling shall, if necessary, be held | 10 January 2024 |
| Timing of Poll | 8.00 AM to 4.00 PM |
| Date of counting of votes | 12 January 2024 |

== Result ==
=== Results by party ===
| Party | Contested | Won | +/- | % of votes |
|---|---|---|---|---|
| Bharatiya Janata Party | 28 | 25 | ▲6 | |
| Indian National Congress | 22 | 0 | ▼2 | |
| Trinamool Congress | 11 | 0 | Steady | |
| Aam Aadmi Party | 5 | 0 | Steady | |
| Independents | 27 | 3 | ▼3 | |
| Total | | 28 | | |

- Asom Gana Parishad, which had one seat before, did not field any candidate.

=== Results by constituency ===
Results
| Constituency | | Winner | | | Runner up | | | Margin |
| No | Name | Name | Party | Votes | Name | Party | Votes | Margin |
|---|---|---|---|---|---|---|---|---|
| 1 | Haflong | Donpainon Thaosen | BJP | 7,536 | Aching Zeme | AITC | 4,325 | 3,211 |
| 2 | Jatinga | Fleming Rupshi Shylla | BJP | 1,929 | Lalremthiem Tuolor | IND | 1,897 | 32 |
| 3 | Borail | Ngulminlal Lienthang | BJP | 2,074 | Tonggoulen Singson | INC | 1,153 | 921 |
| 4 | Mahur | Probita Jahari | BJP | 3,344 | Rahul Naiding | IND | 1,788 | 1,556 |
| 5 | Jinam | Zosumthang Hmar | BJP | 3,581 | Vanlalengpui Hmar | AITC | 199 | 3,382 |
| 6 | Hangrum | Noah Diame | BJP | 1,135 | Paunamsaulakbe Newme | IND | 970 | 165 |
| 7 | Laisong | Paudamming Nriame | BJP | 2,242 | Pauramduing Jeme | IND | 1,534 | 708 |
| 8 | Dautohaja | Pronath Rajiyung | BJP | 1,919 | Samarjit Haflongbar | INC | 672 | 1,247 |
| 9 | Maibang East | Monjoy Langthasa | BJP | Elected Unopposed | | | | |
| 10 | Maibang West | Mohet Hojai | BJP | Elected Unopposed | | | | |
| 11 | Kalachand | Ratan Jarambusa | BJP | 2,087 | Pronen Haflongbar | IND | 2,086 | 1 |
| 12 | Wajao | Biswajit Daulagupu | BJP | 2,038 | Punush Nunisa | IND | 1,870 | 168 |
| 13 | Hajadisa | Projith Hojai | BJP | Elected Unopposed | | | | |
| 14 | Langting | Dhriti Thaosen | BJP | 4,105 | Rajmohon Ardao | INC | 1,328 | 2,777 |
| 15 | Hatikhali | Niranjan Hojai | BJP | 1,722 | Hemanto Kemprai | IND | 1,167 | 555 |
| 16 | Diyungbra | Rupali Langthasa | BJP | 4,474 | Joykanta Kemprai | INC | 1,751 | 2,723 |
| 17 | Garampani | Samsing Engti | BJP | 4,503 | Dormen Enghi | IND | 3,646 | 857 |
| 18 | Kharthong | Lalremsiama Darnei | BJP | 1,705 | Laljoshua Biate | INC | 894 | 811 |
| 19 | Dehangi | Debolal Gorlosa | BJP | 3,847 | Kome Kemprai | INC | 33 | 3,814 |
| 20 | Gunjung | Nojit Kemprai | BJP | Elected Unopposed | | | | |
| 21 | Hadingma | Devojit Bathari | BJP | 2,055 | Dipali Hapila Naiding | INC | 222 | 1,833 |
| 22 | Dihamlao | Ramgalungbe Jeme | IND | 1,616 | Namrang Zeme | BJP | 1,147 | 469 |
| 23 | Harangajao | Amendu Hojai | BJP | Elected Unopposed | | | | |
| 24 | Hamri | Monjit Naiding | BJP | Elected Unopposed | | | | |
| 25 | Lower Kharthong | Ngamrothang Hmar | BJP | 1,146 | Lalropui Hmar | IND | 1,051 | 95 |
| 26 | Dolong | John Phoithong | IND | 672 | Suanthangjem Hrangkhol | BJP | 609 | 63 |
| 27 | Diger | Hen Samuel Changsan | BJP | 695 | Satminthang Khongsai | AITC | 520 | 175 |
| 28 | Semkhor | Herojit Jidung | IND | 684 | Ranu Langthasa | BJP | 590 | 94 |

== See also ==
- Dima Hasao district
- 2020 Bodoland Territorial Council election
