= Nigamananda Saraswati =

Indian Hindu monk who went on an ultimately-fatal hunger strike

Nigamanand Saraswati

Personal life
- Born: Swaroopam Kumar Jha "Girish"; 2 August 1976 Darbhanga, Bihar
- Died: 13 June 2011 (aged 34)

Religious life
- Religion: Hinduism

Nigamanand Saraswati or Swami Nigamananda (2 August 1976 – 13 June 2011), often referred to as Ganga Putra Nigamananda, was a Hindu monk, who went on a hunger strike on 19 February 2011 to save the river Ganges from pollution caused by illegal mining in the river bed. He was born in Ladari, Darbhanga and died on 13 June, the 115th day of his fast.

The movement against mining in the river Ganges started in December 1997, and Nigamanand was a central figure of this movement.

== Early life ==
Swami Nigamanand Saraswati was born Swaroopam Kumar Jha "Girish" on 2 August 1976. His family came from Ladari village in Darbhanga district, Bihar. Swaroopam was often referred as Girish by his mother Kalpana Jha and other close relatives and friends. He was preparing for engineering entrance in Delhi after his schooling in 1993–95. During the same time he left his place in search of truth on 2 October 1995. He just left a letter for his family based in the Ladari village under Keoti police station in Darbhanga. He did not divulge where he was going. The young Girish continued the life of a mendicant sadhu living on alms for a couple of years, and during this period he travelled in various parts of North India for seeking the Truth. After three years his parents came to know that Nigamanand (Girish) was living at Matri Sadan, a hermitage in the outskirt of Haridwar, founded and run by Swami Shivanand and his disciples Gokulanand Saraswati and Nikhilanand Saraswati.

== Brief history of movement ==
In 1997, a group of young activist monks gathered at right bank of the Ganges in Hardwar region of Uttarakhand. They have formed Matri Sadan, a socio-spiritual outfit to fight against corruption and destruction of environment and ecology. The group focused on the Ganges and the Himalayas. The inmates of Matri Sadan evolved a peaceful and nonviolent technique used by Mohandas K. Gandhi to protect the river from indiscriminate mining especially in the Kumbh Mela area of Hardwar. Their protest against mining continued for more than a decade. Nigamanand Saraswati along with his fellow companion launched a hunger strike in January 1998 and again in June of the same year. He fasted for over seventy days. Meanwhile, the organisation raised several satyagraha, as they named the hunger strike, to eliminate indiscriminate quarrying in the Kumbh Mela area.

== Controversial death ==
He again raised the illegal mining issue in February 2011, when he started his final hunger strike. He was taken to hospital on 27 April, the 68th day of his fast. On 30 April, he was allegedly given an injection by an unknown person dressed as a nurse. At the Himalayan Institute Hospital (Jolly Grant), he was diagnosed with "unknown poisoning". He was treated with antidotes after the serum report confirmed the poisoning.

He died on 13 June. A hospital spokesperson said prior to a post-mortem examination that the death was due to dehydration. Shivanand alleged that Nigamanand was killed on the orders of those whom he was opposing. Nigamanand's grandfather Surya Narayan Jha claimed that Nigamanand was poisoned to death during treatment and accused the Uttarakhand government of insensitivity. He also sought a probe into the role of Nigamanand's guru, Shivanand, accusing him of forcing him to go on a fast. The Indian National Congress Party was also quick to attack the Bharatiya Janata Party over Swami Nigamanand's death. Leader of Opposition in Uttarakhand assembly Harak Singh Rawat (Congress) had demanded CBI inquiry into the death. The pathological report of Nigamanand's serum sample showed evidence of organophosphate poisoning. The cholinesterase serum test is usually done to measure exposure to organophosphate insecticides. In the case of Nigamanand, doctors recommended it when his aides reported signs of poisoning. The case was investigated by the CBI and a medical board but their outcomes did not satisfy Matri Sadan.

Shivanand fasted for 11 days from 25 November 2011, to take forward Nigamanand's movement. Finally, the Uttarakhand government released an order to ban mining all over Hardwar district. According to administration officials, quarrying on the Ganges would now be studied by a special committee which would assess its environmental impacts the river and its nearby areas.

== Literary works ==
Swami Nigamananda Saraswati was a researcher and scholar of Vedic literature. He was one of the editors of the socio-spiritual journal Divine Message. The journal was published by the end of the 1991s by its editor-in-chief Swami Nikhilananda Saraswati, one of the founder monks of Matri Sadan. Swami Nigamanand Saraswati and Swami Satchidananda Saraswati were members of the editorial team of the journal. The quarterly journal published his long essays in every issue. He has focused on the Vedic texts in his writings. He has also contributed for certain other literary works during the sixteen years of his monastic life.

== See also ==
- Illegal mining in India
