= Kopili Hydro Electric Project =

Hydroelectric power project in Assam, India

Khandong Dam
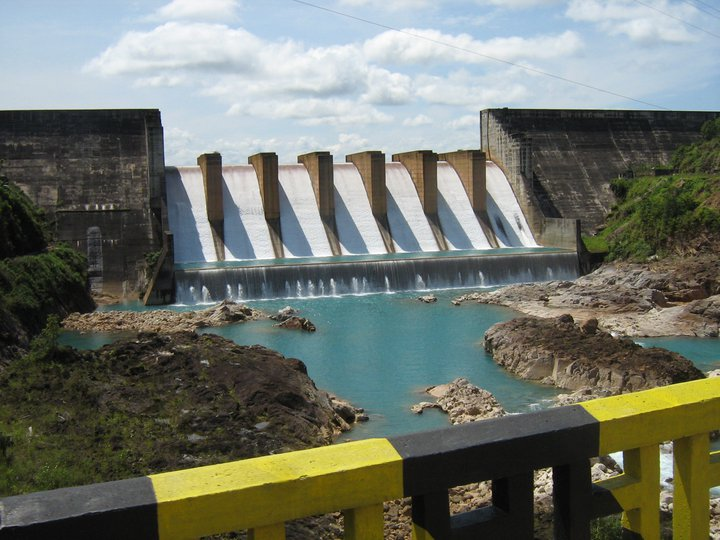
- The Khandong dam
- Interactive map of Khandong Dam
- Official name: Kopili Hydro Electric Project
- Location: Assam, India
- Coordinates: 25°31′43″N 92°37′58″E
- Purpose: Power
- Opening date: 1984; 41 years ago
- Owner: Government of India

Dam and spillways
- Type of dam: Concrete Gravity
- Impounds: Kopili River
- Height: 66 metres (217 ft)
- Length: 243 metres (797 ft)
- Spillway capacity: 15417 m³/s

Reservoir
- Creates: Kopili Reservoir
- Total capacity: 166800
- Surface area: 13.36 square kilometres (5.16 sq mi)

Khandong Power House
- Coordinates: 25°31′01″N 92°39′58″E
- Operator: NEEPCO
- Commission date: 8 March 1984
- Turbines: 3×25 MW
- Installed capacity: 75 MW
- Annual generation: 363.9 MU
- Website; NEEPCO

Umrong Dam
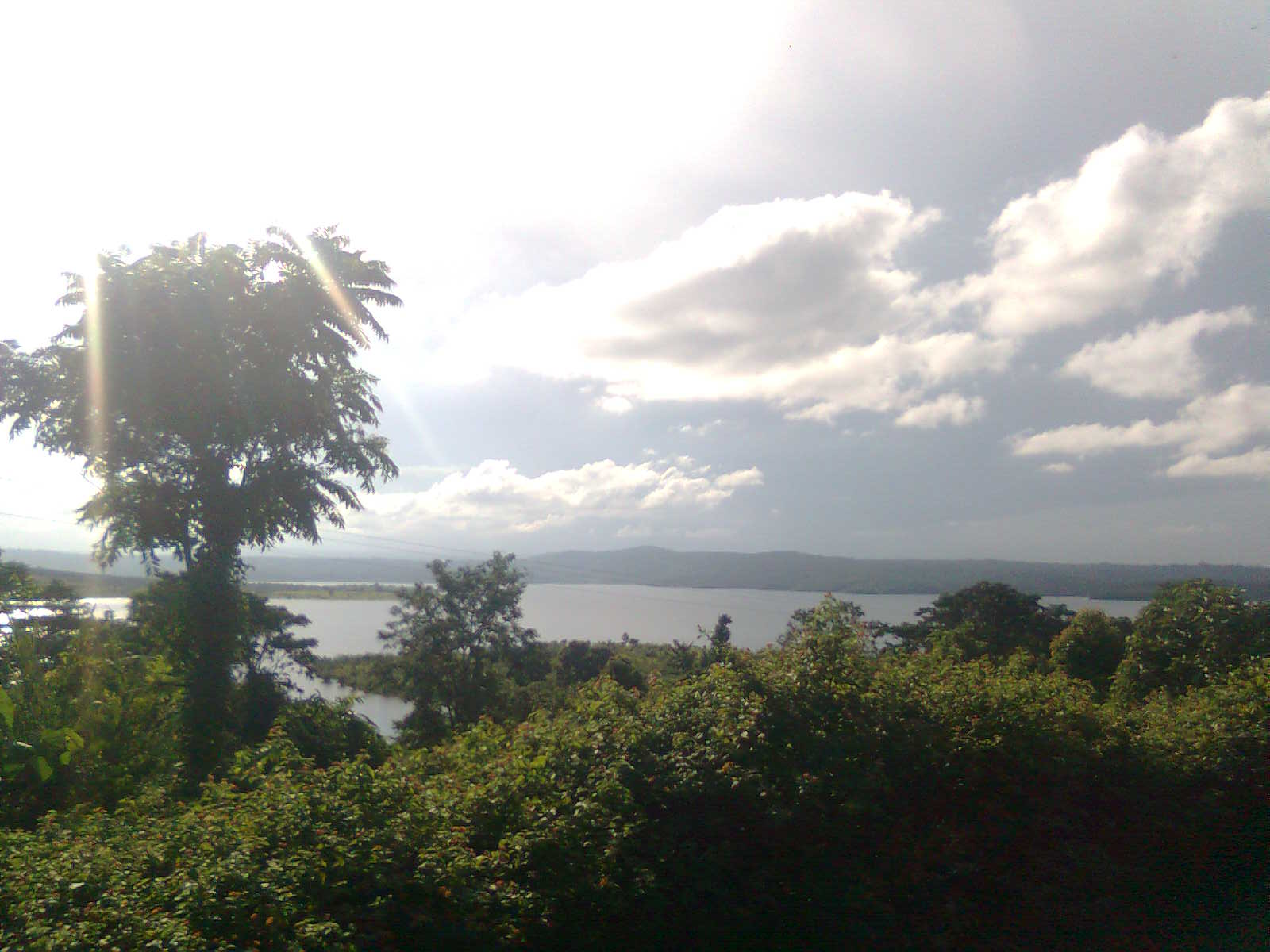
- View of Umrong Reservoir from Umrangso
- Interactive map of Umrong Dam
- Official name: Kopili Hydro Electric Project
- Coordinates: 25°31′43″N 92°42′45″E
- Purpose: Power
- Opening date: 1988; 37 years ago

Dam and spillways
- Type of dam: Concrete Gravity
- Impounds: Umrang river
- Height: 30 metres (98 ft)
- Length: 143 metres (469 ft)
- Spillway type: Ogee Radial
- Spillway capacity: 554.7 m³/s

Reservoir
- Creates: Umrong Reservoir
- Total capacity: 175000
- Surface area: 16 square kilometres (6.2 sq mi)

Kopili Power House
- Coordinates: 25.586020°N 92.723019°E
- Operator: NEEPCO
- Commission date: 4 July 1988; 37 years ago
- Turbines: 4×50 MW
- Installed capacity: 200 MW

Kopili Hydro Electric Project is a 275 megawatts (369,000 hp), hydroelectric power project on the Kopili river and its tributary, Umrong stream. It is located in Dima Hasao district of Assam state in India. The project is developed and operated by North Eastern Electric Power Corporation Limited. It is an important project since the Indian state of Assam, Arunachal Pradesh, Manipur, Meghalaya, Mizoram, Nagaland and Tripura benefit from this project.

== Overview ==
The Khandong dam impounds Kopili river and Umrong dam impounds Umrong river creating Kopili reservoir and Umrong reservoir. Kopili reservoir partially falls in Meghalaya state as Kopili river forms geographical boundary between Assam and Meghalaya in this region. Water from Kopili reservoir is fed to Khandong power station, releasing water into Umrong reservoir. Water from Umrong reservoir is diverted via tunnels to Kopili power station on the bank of Kopili river. Tail race waters of Kopili power house are released back into the Kopili river. Although this project is not classified as such, its design is very similar to run-of-the-river power projects.

== Power plants ==
=== Khandong I & II ===
The Khandong power house stage-I and stage-II are located between two reservoirs, near Umrong reservoir, in geographical location 25.5168°N 92.6660°E and Khandong dam is located at 25.5286°N 92.6327°E. Khandong Stage-I powerhouse has 2x25 MW Francis type turbines, generating 50 MW power at peak. It is connected to Kopili reservoir via a 4.5 metres (15 ft) diameter, 2,852 metres (9,357 ft) long concrete-lined head race tunnel. First and second units of stage-I were commissioned on 8 March and 3 May 1984 respectively. Khandong stage II powerhouse is located close to stage-I power station. It has 1x25 MW turbine, connected via a 480 metres (1,570 ft) long water conductor system, which was provisioned for at the time of stage-I construction. Third turbine was commissioned on 26 July 2004.

=== Kopili I & II ===
The Kopili power house stage-I and stage-II are located on the right bank of Kopili river in geographical location 25.586°N 92.723°E. The related Umrong dam, completed in 1988, is located at 25.5284°N 92.7126°E. Khandong Stage-I and II powerhouse is installed with 4x50 MW Francis type turbines, generating 200 MW power at peak. It is connected to Umrong reservoir via a 4.6 metres (15 ft) diameter, 5.5 kilometres (3.4 mi) long concrete-lined head race tunnel. The first unit of stage-I was commissioned on 4 July 1988.

=== Lower Kopili HEP ===
Because of contamination of Kopili river waters, the prospect of Lower Kopili Hydro Electric Project downstream of Kopili powerhouse has met with hurdles for environmental clearances and financial funding of the project. The 120 MW power project will be funded by the Asian Development Bank.

== Environment issue ==
This hydroelectric project has suffered some serious damage due to contamination of Kopili river with acid mine discharge from open cast coal mines and rat hole mining in Meghalaya.

== Incidents ==
=== 2019 ===
The Hydro project site was submerged and flooded following a pipeline burst on 7 October 2019. 4 people has since been reported missing in the overflowing project site. The burst happened on an old pipe, which was repaired the previous year.

=== 2022 ===
Incident at Khandong Power Plant claimed lives of three persons.

== Map ==
Kopili Hydro Electric Project

== See also ==
- List of dams and reservoirs in Assam
