= Jatinga River =

River in India

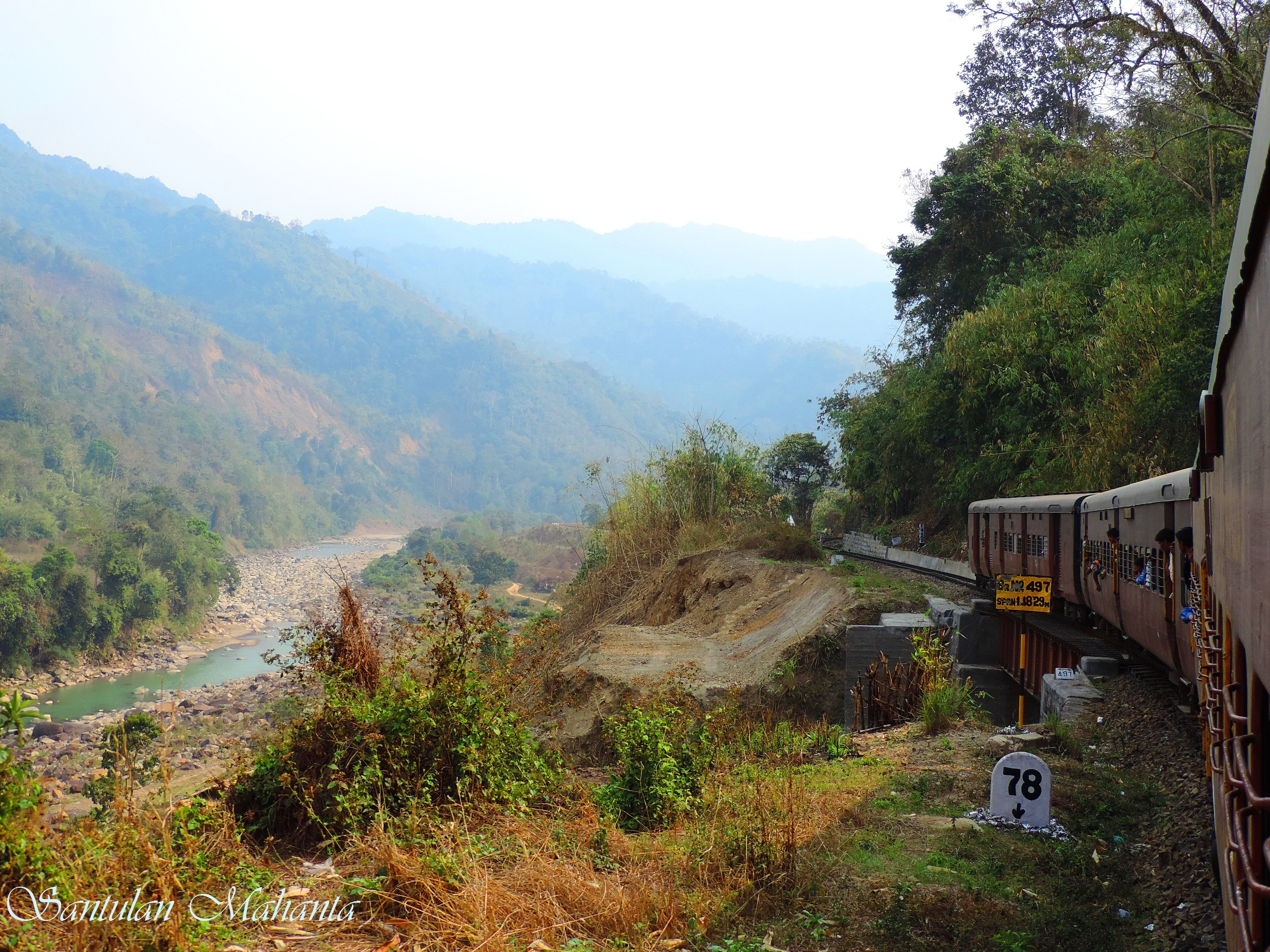
- A view of Jatinga River from a train of North East Frontier Railway

- Location within Assam Location within India
- Native name: জাতিংগা নদী (Assamese)

Location
- State: Assam
- District: Dima Hasao District & Cachar District

Physical characteristics
- Source: Barail Hill
  - location: Dima Hasao district, Assam
  - coordinates: 25°07′24.8″N 93°00′14.1″E
- Mouth: Barak River
  - location: Jatingamukh, Cachar district, Assam
  - coordinates: 24°53′09.8″N 92°44′14.3″E

Basin features
- Progression: Jatinga River - Barak River

The Jatinga River is a north bank tributary of the Barak River in the Indian state of Assam. The river originates from Barail hill range in the village Jatinga at Dima Hasao district of Assam. The Jatinga then flows through the western boundary of the Barail Wildlife Sanctuary and then join several other small tributaries like Chhotarekha, Bororekha, Daku, Chhota Lokha, Dimru, Ditokcherra, Kayang, Dolu, Badri etc before its confluence with the Barak river at Jatingamukh (Jatinga-mukh where mukh means mouth in Assamese language) below Barkhola village near Chandpur of Cachar District.
