= Pagladiya River =

River in India

Pagladiya River Pagladia River
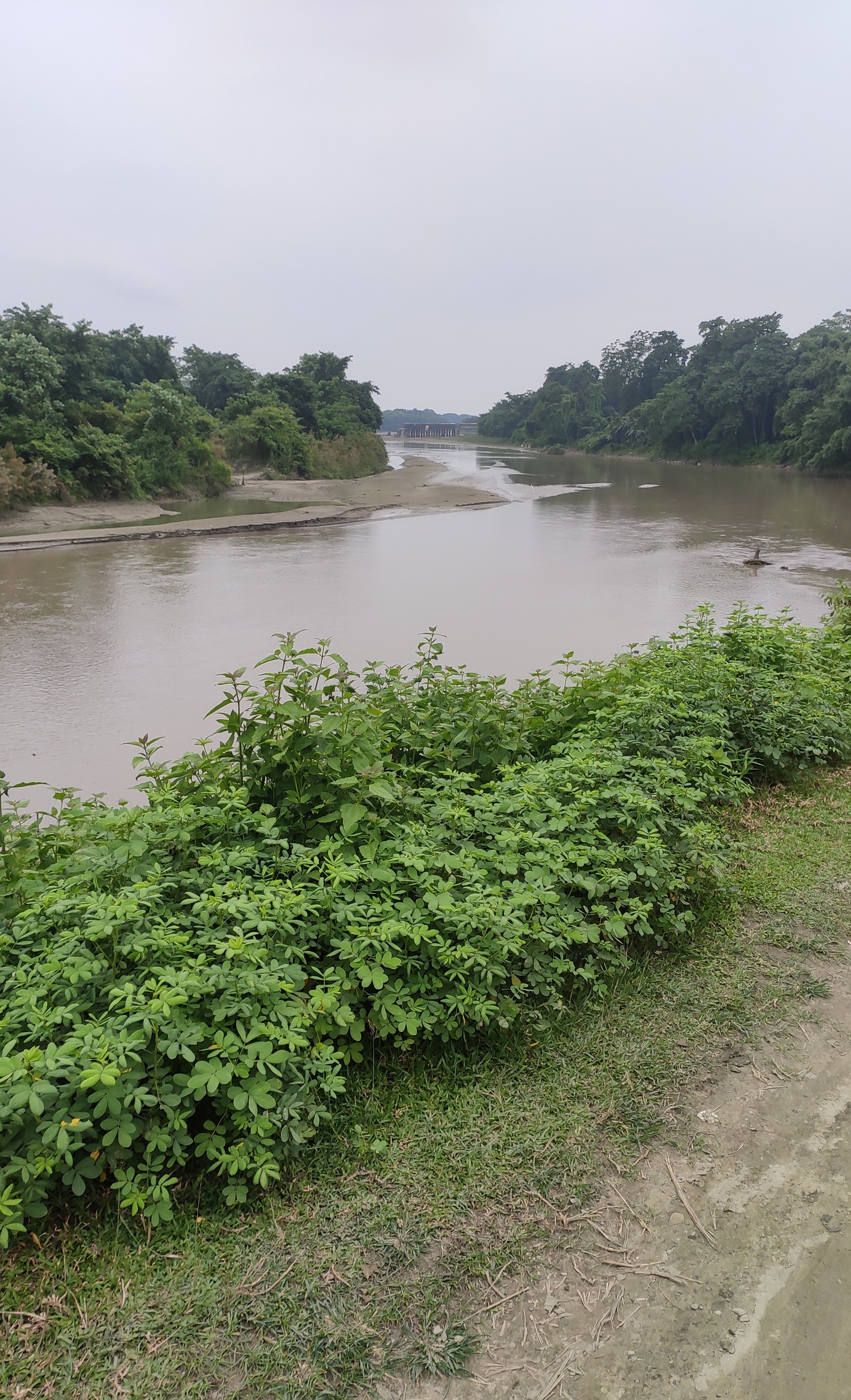
- Pagladiya River in Nalbari district

- Location within Assam Location within India

Location
- State: Assam
- District: Baksa & Nalbari

Physical characteristics
- Source: Bhutan Hill
  - location: Deothang, Bhutan
  - coordinates: 26°51′24.5″N 91°24′54.2″E
- Mouth: Brahmaputra River
  - coordinates: 26°15′18.9″N 91°25′59.7″E

Basin features
- Progression: Pagladiya River - Brahmaputra River

The Pagladiya River is a northern bank tributary of the Brahmaputra River in the Indian state of Assam. The Pagladiya River originates in the Bhutan hills and flows through Baksa District and Nalbari district before its confluence with the Brahmaputra River. Pagladiya River is perennial, very shallow, and is characteristically known for flash floods and high discharge rates.

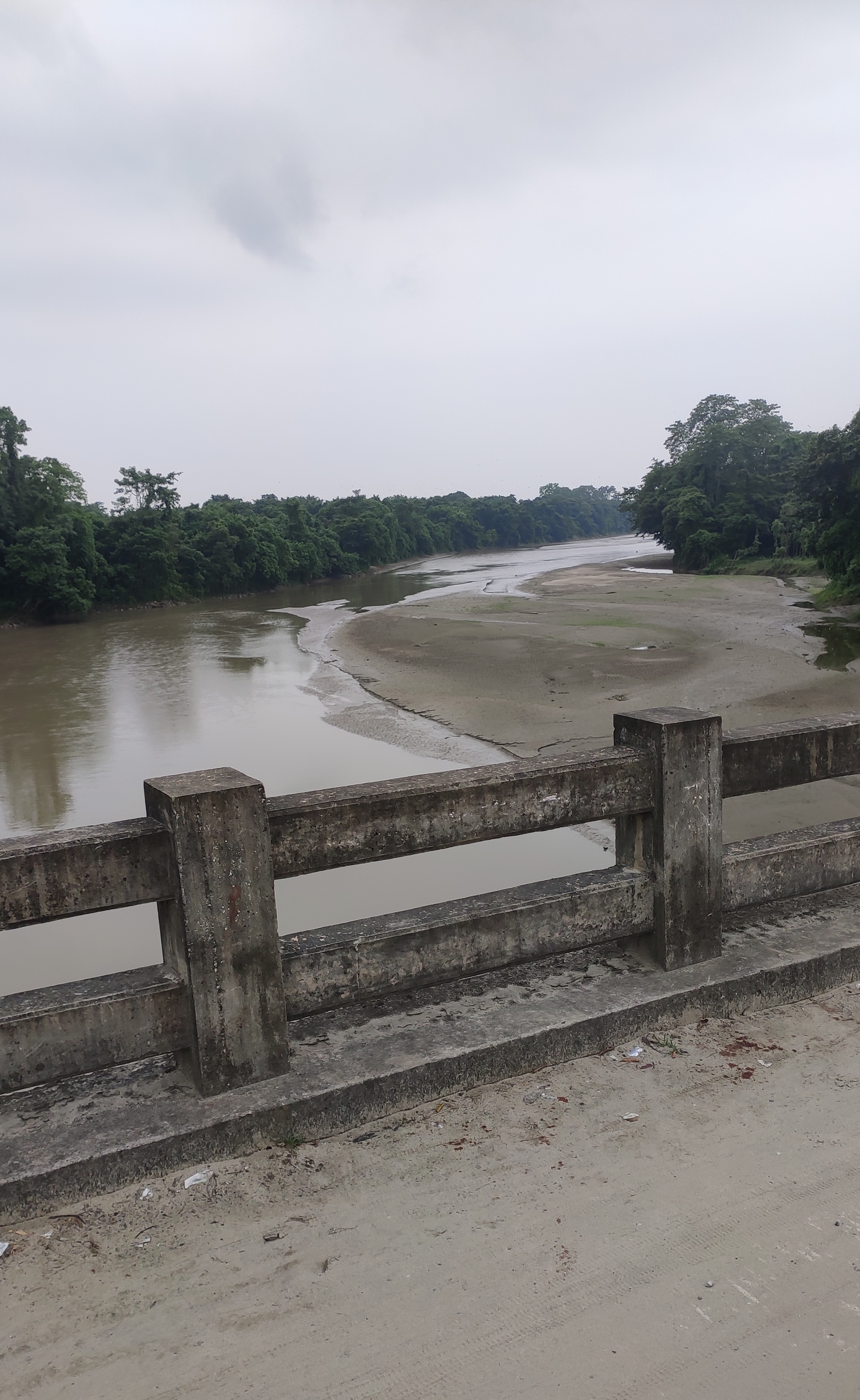
Pagladiya River from Sonkuriha bridge in Nalbari district

== Relict of Pagladiya ==
The Pagladiya basin has been developed by the actively migrating nature of the stream and resulted a basin of complex migration pattern. The relict of the earlier Pagladiya known as Mora Pagladiya (Dead Pagladiya) can still be seen in the form of abandoned channel passing through Khagrabari and Barama of Baksa District.
