= Umrangso =

Umrangso Umrongso
- Town
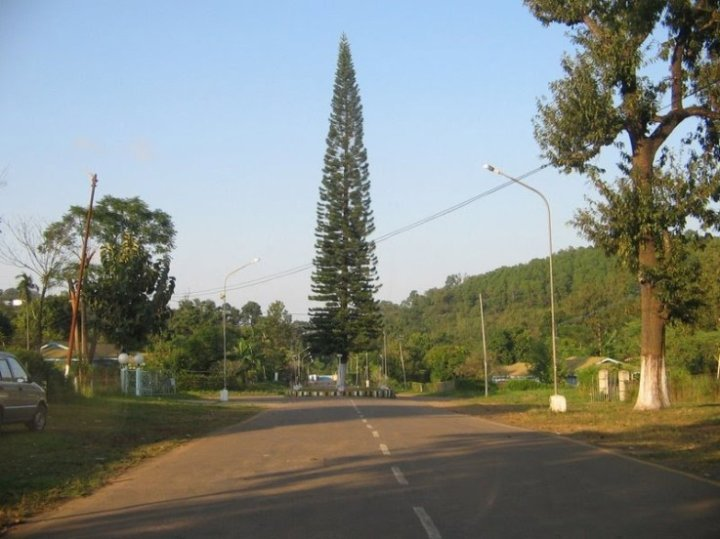
- Main Square, Neepco Colony, Umrangso
- Nickname: Garampani
- Location in Assam, India Umrangso (India)
- Coordinates: 25.51357°N 92.73704°E
- Country: India
- State: Assam
- District: Dima Hasao

Area
  - Total: 3.98 km^{2} (1.54 sq mi)
- Elevation: 640 m (2,100 ft)

Population (2001)
  - Total: 9,024
  - Density: 2,270/km^{2} (5,870/sq mi)

Languages
  - Spoken: Dimasa, Khasi, Karbi.
- Time zone: UTC+5:30 (IST)
- PIN: 788931
- Telephone code: 03670
- Vehicle registration: AS08
- Sex ratio: 0.8245 ♂/♀

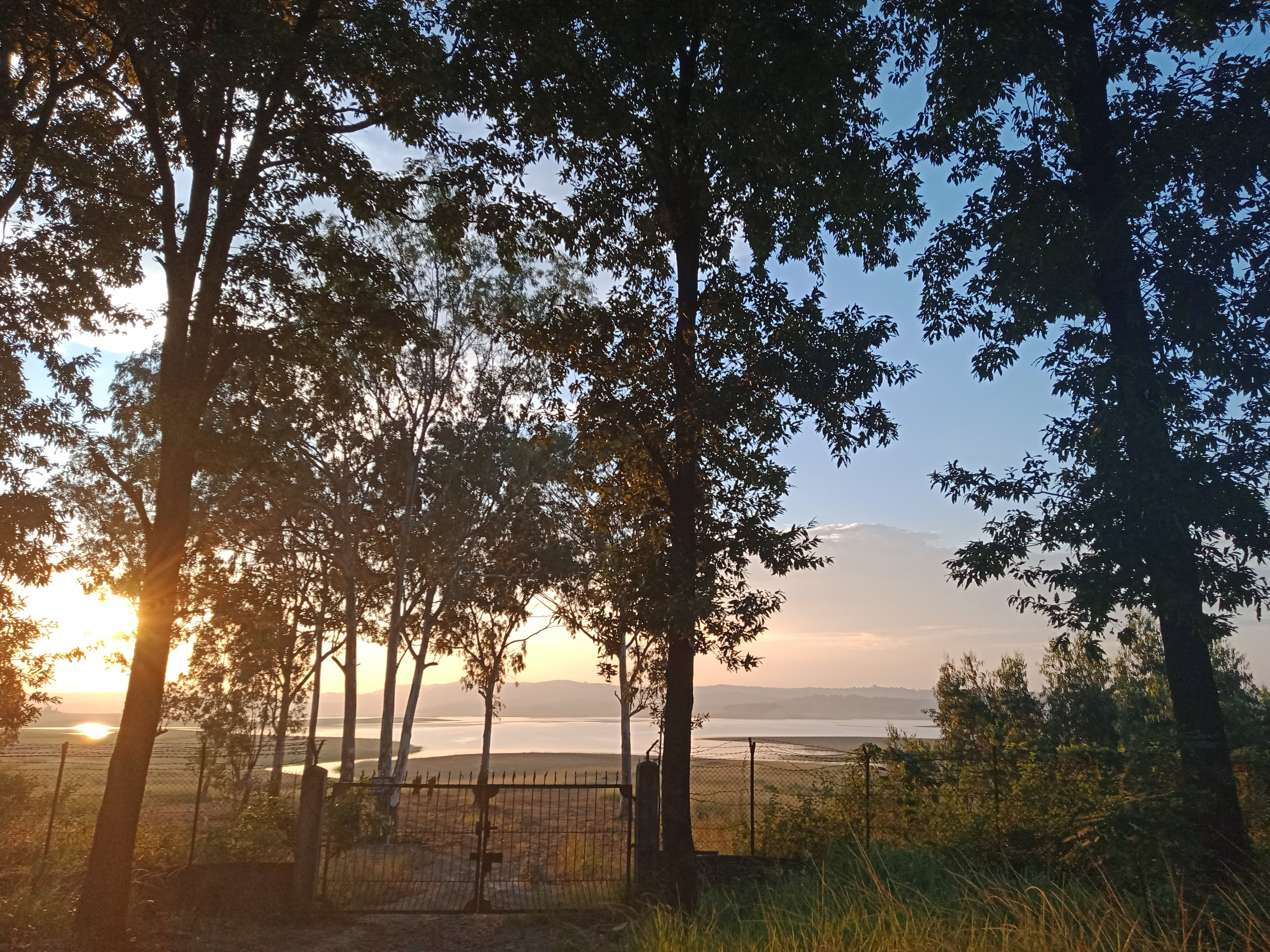
A view from Umrangso's NEEPCO.

Umrangso is an industrial town and a town area committee in Dima Hasao district in the state of Assam, India. It is located at the border of Assam and Meghalaya states some 112 km from Haflong, the district headquarters of Dima Hasao district of Assam.

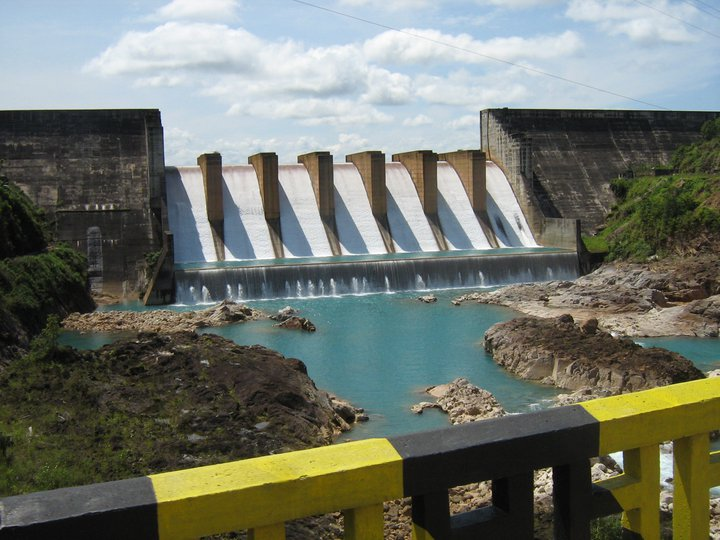
Khandong Dam

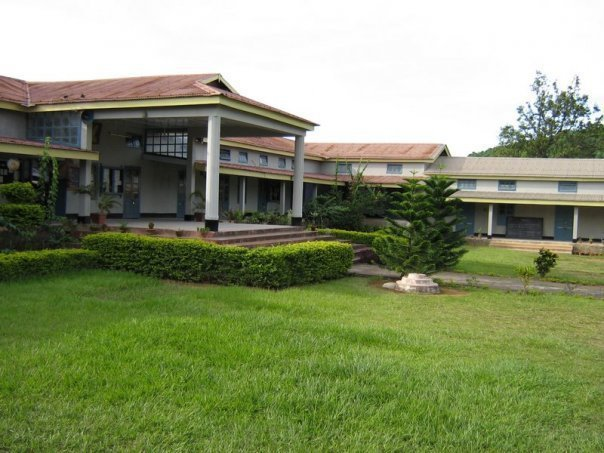
Vivekananda Kendra Vidyalaya

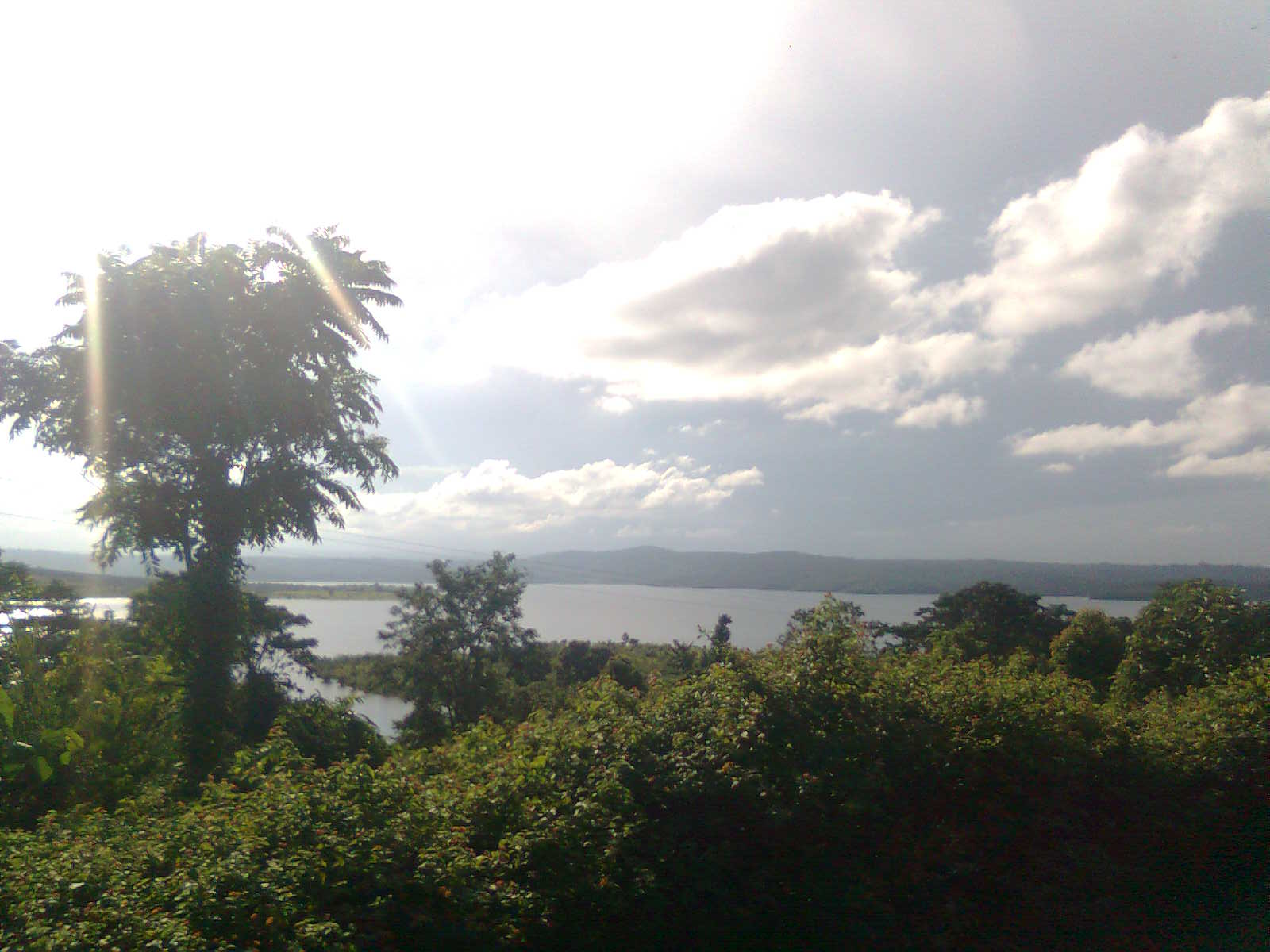
The Umrangso Reservoir

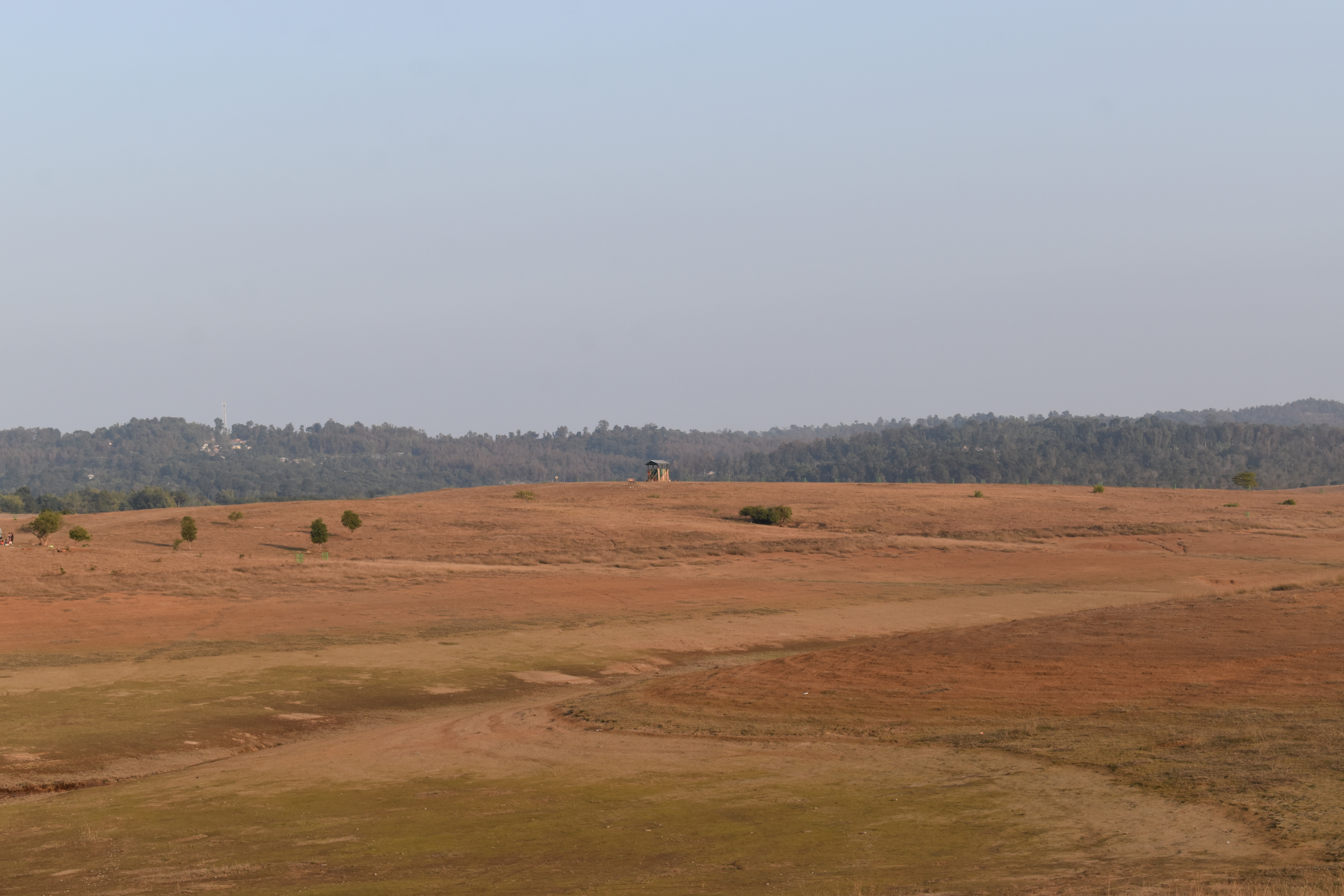
Overview picture of Umrangso Golf field.

== Etymology ==
The name "Umrangso" is derived from the Pnar dialect of the Khasi language, and means "red colour water" ("Um" meaning "water" and "rangso" meaning "red colour").

== History ==
The region has been deeply affected by factional violence involving several armed insurgent groups fighting among themselves and with the Indian Security Forces. Since 2011 there has been a decrease in violence following arrests of several high-ranking insurgent leaders and a cease-fire agreement with the Indian Government.

== Economy ==
=== Tourism ===
Umrangso golf field is a popular place for sightseeing, trekking, camping, and boating. It also host the annual Falcon Festival.

=== Energy ===
==== NEEPCO - Kopili Hydro Electric Project ====
A government of India enterprise, located in the Dima Hasao district (formerly known as North Cachar Hills district) near the Assam-Meghalaya border, the hot spring of Garampani is now lost in the dammed water of Kopili river after completion of Kopili Hydro Electric Project. The Kopili Hydro Electric Project was the maiden venture of NEEPCO when it came into existence in 1976.

Khandong and Kopili Power Station
The first stage of Kopili Hydro Electric Plant has two dam and dyke systems which created two reservoirs, one on the Kopili River and the other on the Umrong stream, a tributary of the Kopili. Water from the Kopili reservoir is used in the Khandong power station through a 2759 metre tunnel to generate 50 MW (2 × 25 MW) of power. The tail water from this powerhouse is led to the Umrong reservoir. The water from Umrong reservoir is taken through a 5473 metre tunnel to the Kopili power station to generate 200 MW (4 × 50 MW) of power.

The first stage extension of the plant envisaged setting up two additional 50 MW units at Kopili power station, provisions for which were already kept during the first stage development of the project. The Units III and IV under this extension scheme were commissioned in March 1997 and June 1997 respectively. The total installed capacity of the Kopili power station thus went up to 200 MW and that of the project as whole to 275 MW. The Umrong reservoir was raised by 7.6 m to meet the demand for more water for two additional 50 MW units of first stage extension.

KHEP Stage II power station
The second stage of the Kopili Hydro Electric Plant involves a powerhouse to generate additional 25 MW of power by using water from the Khandong reservoir through a 481 metre long water conductor system, provision of which was kept as a bypass conduit from the surge shaft in the Khandong tunnel. The water from the second stage powerhouse will go to the Umrong reservoir for use in the Kopili power station.

=== Cement Industry ===
- Vinay Cement

Vinay Cements was set up in 1989 at a capital cost of ₹270 million. At the time of commissioning, it was one of the largest private sector investments in the North-East region. The plant uses rotary technology with a four stage pre-heater and fourth generation grate cooler with current installed capacity of 0.24 million tons per annum. In its category, it has consistently been among the top three manufacturers of cement since its inception. In 2004 it became a 100% debt-free company. In 2006–2007 it has reported revenues of ₹488 million and an earnings before interest, taxes, depreciation and amortization (EBIDTA) of ₹117 million. With a view to consolidate the group companies and provide greater shareholder value, it has recently initiated the process of acquiring RCL Cement in an all-stock deal.

- NECEM Cements Limited (1989)
- RCL (1999),
- Calcom (2007)
- Dalmia cement factory (2011).

Residents in the area claim that the presence of these cement factories has led to chronic air pollution.

== Demographics ==
As of 2011 India census, Umrongso had a population of 10,376. Males constitute 55% of the population and females 45%. Umrongso has an average literacy rate of 74%, higher than the national average of 59.5%: male literacy is 79%, and female literacy is 69%, 14% of the population is under 6 years of age. Some of the ethnicities in the town are Dimasa, Karbi, Biates, Khasi, Nepali, Khelma.

== Education ==
Vivekananda Kendra Vidyalaya, Umrangso (one of the schools in Vivekananda Kendra Vidyalaya system), Garampani High School, Smt. Jamuna Devi Saraswati Vidya Mandir, are the three kindergarten through higher secondary schools in the town. J. B. Hagjer College (affiliated to Assam University, Silchar) is the sole university level educational institution in town. Some private institutions provided in the area are Saraswati Shishu Vatika Umrongso, Sacred Heart High School, Royal Academy (12 km), Standard English School (Hebron), Himalayan Academy (Rongarting), Dimarazi Secondary School (Umrongso), Carmel Standard School (3 km). Besides these institutions some 'Government High Schools' are also established in the village areas of the town for a less cost studies.

== See also ==
- Falcon Festival
