= Zeme =

Zeme may refer to:

- Zemes māte, the Slavic and Latvian goddess of the earth, identical to Lithuanian Žemyna
- Zeme, Lombardy, a village in Italy
- Zeme people, a Naga tribe of northeastern India
- Zeme language, the Sino-Tibetan language spoken by the tribe
- Zeme languages, a group of languages that includes the Zeme language
