= Necklaced laughingthrush =

Necklaced laughingthrush may refer to:

- Greater necklaced laughingthrush, a species of bird in the family Leiothrichidae
- Lesser necklaced laughingthrush, a species of bird in the family Leiothrichidae
