= Haflong =

Haflong The White Ant Hills Town
- Town
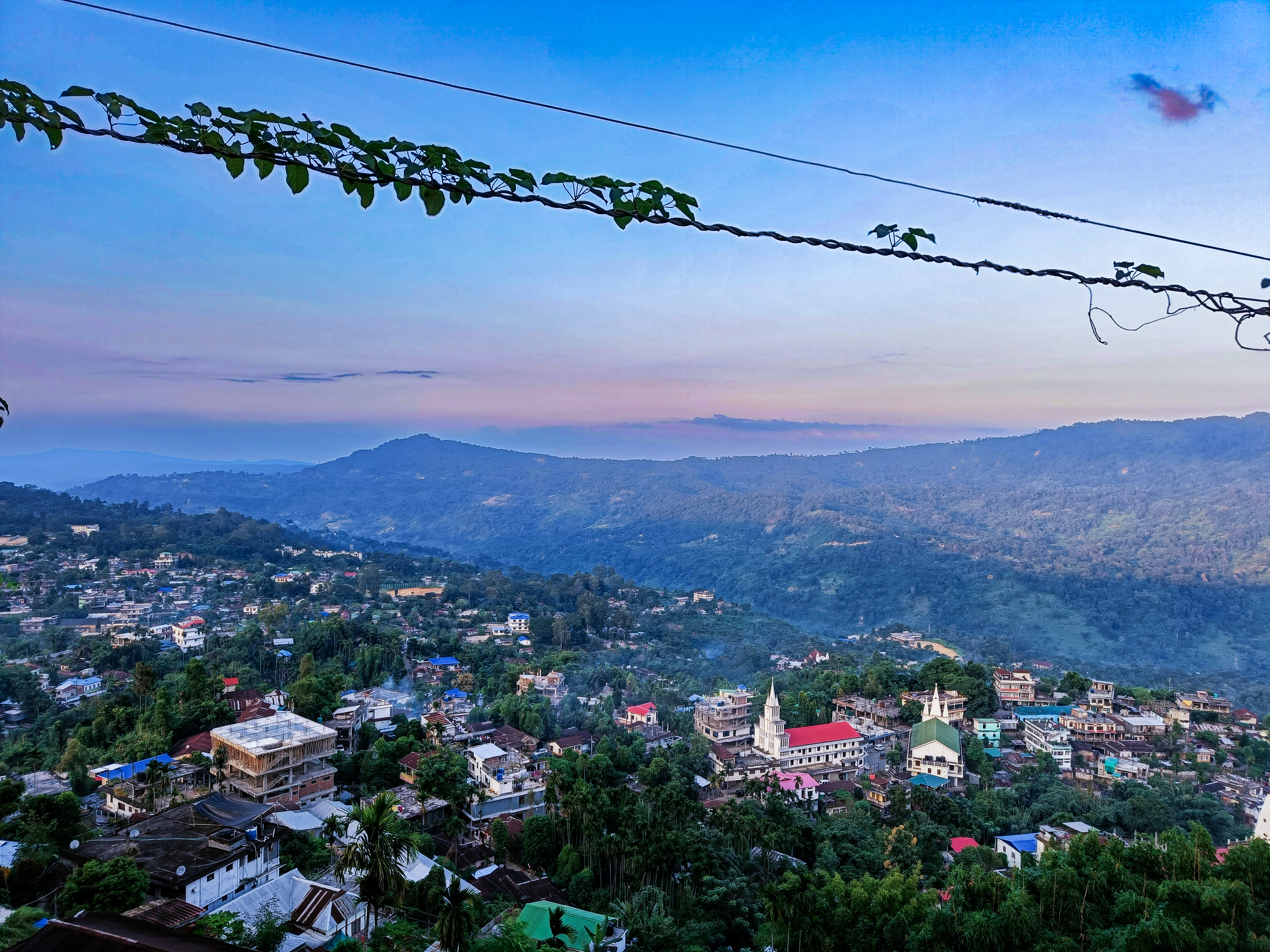
- A bird's eye view of Haflong town from Synod view point (altitude: 593 mt amsl approx).

- Location within Assam Location within India Location within Asia
- Coordinates: 25.169°N 93.016°E
- Country: India
- State: Assam
- District: Dima Hasao

Government
  - Body: Haflong Municipal Board

Area
  - Total: 12.79 km^{2} (4.94 sq mi)
- Elevation: 966.216 m (3,170.00 ft)

Population (2011)
  - Total: 43,756
  - Density: 3,421/km^{2} (8,861/sq mi)

Languages
  - Lingua franca: Haflong Hindi
  - Most common: Bengali, Dimasa Zeme
- Time zone: UTC+5:30 (IST)
- PIN: 788819 & 788820
- Telephone code: 03673
- ISO 3166 code: IN-AS
- Vehicle registration: AS 08-X XXXX

Haflong is a town and the headquarters of the Dima Hasao district of the northeast Indian state of Assam. It is the only hill station in the state.

== Etymology ==
Haflong is a Dimasa word meaning ant hill.

== Geography ==
Haflong has a subtropical highland climate (Köppen climate classification Cwb), falling just short of a tropical savanna climate (Köppen climate classification Aw). In May 2022, Haflong witnessed torrential rainfall, recording the highest rainfall, up to 451 mm on 14 May 2022, as compared to the maximum 190 mm to 200 mm reported annually.

Climate data for Haflong
Month	Jan	Feb	Mar	Apr	May	Jun	Jul	Aug	Sep	Oct	Nov	Dec	Year
Record high °C (°F)	28.8 (83.8)	25.2 (77.4)	28.4 (83.1)	29.0 (84.2)	20.0 (68.0)	28.3 (82.9)	26.5 (79.7)	28.2 (82.8)	25.8 (78.4)	24.3 (75.7)	26.0 (78.8)	18.1 (64.6)	29.0 (84.2)
Mean daily maximum °C (°F)	19.6 (67.3)	20.2 (68.4)	21.0 (69.8)	22.2 (72.0)	22.2 (72.0)	25.7 (78.3)	24.9 (76.8)	23.2 (73.8)	22.7 (72.9)	22.3 (72.1)	21.6 (70.9)	20.7 (69.3)	22.2 (72.0)
Mean daily minimum °C (°F)	8.3 (46.9)	12.0 (53.6)	15.9 (60.6)	20.0 (68.0)	22.7 (72.9)	20.9 (69.6)	20.6 (69.1)	20.6 (69.1)	21.7 (71.1)	21.9 (71.4)	16.7 (62.1)	11.8 (53.2)	17.8 (64.0)
Record low °C (°F)	3.7 (38.7)	4.1 (39.4)	6.3 (43.3)	12.0 (53.6)	13.2 (55.8)	15.4 (59.7)	18.4 (65.1)	18.1 (64.6)	15.7 (60.3)	10.6 (51.1)	8.3 (46.9)	5.0 (41.0)	3.7 (38.7)
Average rainfall mm (inches)	11.9 (0.47)	18.3 (0.72)	55.8 (2.20)	147.9 (5.82)	244.2 (9.61)	316.4 (12.46)	345.4 (13.60)	264.3 (10.41)	185.9 (7.32)	91.2 (3.59)	18.7 (0.74)	7.1 (0.28)	1,707.1 (67.22)
Average rainy days	1.8	2.9	5.8	13.1	17.0	19.6	22.3	18.5	15.2	7.4	2.8	1.3	127.7
Average relative humidity (%)	69	55	47	48	55	51	53	52	53	52	52	52	53
Mean monthly sunshine hours	106.3	174.7	180.1	181.0	152.2	102.0	104.0	121.2	98.0	104.6	131.0	132.5	1,587.6
Source 1: World Meteorological Organization. NOAA (extremes & humidity, 1971–1990)
Source 2: Hong Kong Observatory.

== Demographics ==
Languages spoken in Haflong town (2011)
1. Bengali (22.2%)
2. Dimasa (17.9%)
3. Hmar (11.2%)
4. Zemi (7.83%)
5. Kuki (6.92%)
6. Hindi (6.36%)
7. Assamese (2.82%)
8. others (24.7%)

=== Population ===
As of 2011, India census, Haflong has a population of 43,756. Males constitute 45% of the population and females 55%. Haflong has an average literacy rate of 92%, higher than the national average of 59.5%: male literacy is 85%, and female literacy is 75%. In Haflong, 12% of the population is under 6 years of age. As of 2011, Haflong town has a population of 43,756.

Population changes
Year	1951	1991	2001	2011
Population	2,168	26,191	36,302	43,756

=== Languages ===
Bengali is the most spoken language of the town with a population of 9,710, followed by Dimasa (7,855). Haflong Hindi is the lingua franca of the town. Other languages with significant population include Hmar (4,921), Zemi (3,426), Kuki (3,027), Hindi (2,781) and Assamese (1,236).

== Government and politics ==
Haflong is part of Autonomous District (Lok Sabha constituency). It is the headquarter of Dima Hasao Autonomous Council.

== Tourism ==
Haflong is a popular destination for travellers seeking a quieter alternative to larger hill stations. Trekking and nature walks are also popular in the surrounding hills.

Key attractions include:

- Haflong Lake – a scenic lake in the heart of the town
- Jatinga – known for the phenomenon of bird behaviour (often described as bird "mystery")
- Maibang – historical site with ruins linked to the Dimasa kingdom
