= Mahur, Assam =

Mahur
- Town
- Location in Assam, India Mahur (India)
- Coordinates: 25.17°N 93.12°E
- Country: India
- State: Assam
- District: Dima Hasao

Government
  - Body: Mahur Town Committee
- Elevation: 727 m (2,385 ft)

Population (2001)
  - Total: 5,485

Languages
  - Official: English
- Time zone: UTC+5:30 (IST)
- ISO 3166 code: IN-AS
- Vehicle registration: AS

Mahur (IPA: mɑːʊə) is a town and a town area committee in Dima Hasao district in the Indian state of Assam.

== Geography ==
Mahur is located at 25.17°N 93.12°E. It has an average elevation of 727 metres (2385 feet).

== Transportation ==
Though there is no direct Air connection to Mahur, one can fly to Guwahati or Silchar or Dimapur from where easy road or rail options are available. Mahur railway station of Lumding–Sabroom section provides the rail connectivity in Mahur with Guwahati and Silchar.

== Demographics ==
As of 2001 India census, Mahur had a population of 5485. Males constitute 55% of the population and females 45%. Mahur has an average literacy rate of 76%, higher than the national average of 59.5%: male literacy is 80%, and female literacy is 71%. In Mahur, 13% of the population is under 6 years of age.
