= Kopili River =

River in India

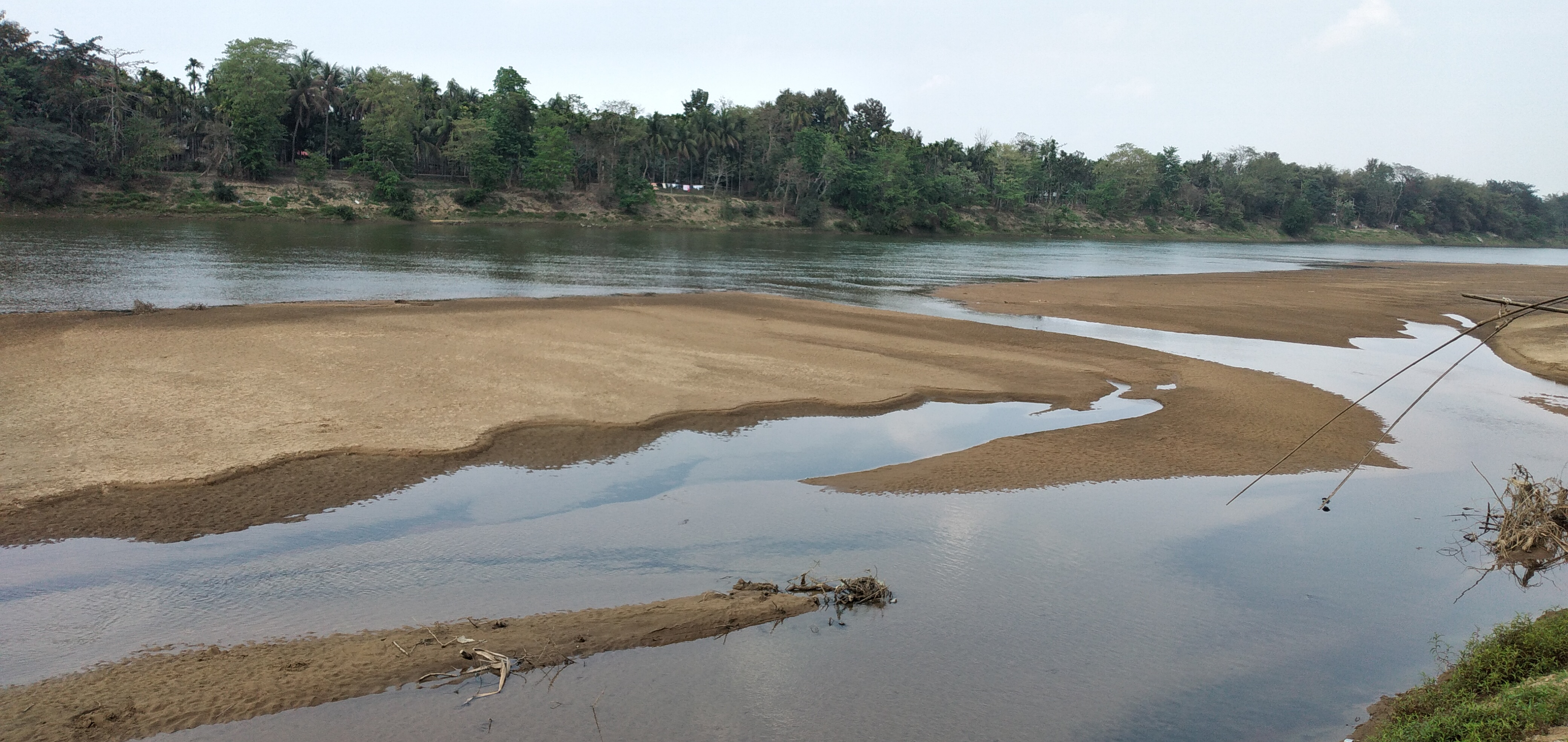
- Kopili River at Nagaon

- Location in Assam, India Kopili River (India)

Location
- Country: India
- Location: Assam, Meghalaya

Physical characteristics
- Source
  - location: Meghalaya Plateau
  - coordinates: 25°10′23.8764″N 92°46′27.1056″E
  - elevation: 1,967 m (6,453 ft)
- Mouth
  - location: Brahmaputra River
  - coordinates: 26°15′3.3264″N 91°57′20.3364″E
  - elevation: 74 m (243 ft)
- Length: 341 km (212 mi)
- Basin size: 20,068 km^{2} (7,748 mi^{2})
- Discharge
  - location: Near mouth
  - average: 1,847 m^{3}/s (65,200 cu ft/s)

Basin features
- Progression: Brahmaputra → Padma → Meghna → Bay of Bengal
- River system: Ganges River
- Tributaries
  - left: Rashu Nadi, Myntang, Amneng, Kalanga Nadi, Borpani, Digaru
  - right: Umrong, Diyung

Kopili River is an interstate river in Northeast India that flows through the states of Meghalaya and Assam and is the largest south bank tributary of the Brahmaputra in Assam.

== Course ==
The Kopili originates in the Meghalaya plateau and flows through Central Assam and the hill districts of Assam before its confluence with the Brahmaputra. In Assam it drains the districts of Karbi Anglong, Dima Hasao, Kamrup and Nagaon. The river flows for a total length of 341 km (212 mi) and has a catchment area of 20,068 km^{2} (7,748 mi^{2}). It is noted for several spectacular waterfalls along its course which has several deep gorges and rapids in the 120 km (75 mi) of its flow before debouching into the plains at Nagaon district. An average of approximately 3,854 mm of precipitation falls annually over the entire Kopili River catchment area.

== Waterworks ==
Completed in 1975, the Kopili Flow Irrigation Scheme in Kamrup district irrigates 1,300 ha (3,200 acres) of land across 14 revenue villages and facilitates paddy cultivation. The Kopili Hydro Electric Project, located across the districts of Dima Hasao in Assam and Jaintia Hills in Meghalaya and run by the North Eastern Electric Power Corporation, consists of the Khandong and Umrongso dams and their reservoirs and three power houses that have a total installed capacity of 275 MW.

== Environmental issues ==
The Kopili has as many as 54 species of fish in it. Unscientific opencast coal mining in the Kopili's upper reaches in Meghalaya has led to acidification of the river which has in turn left part of the river's course biologically dead, making the water unfit for human consumption and has led to frequent outages at the Kopili Hydro Electric Project's power stations. The 275 MW Kopili Dam Power House of NEEPCO (North Eastern Electric Power Corporation Limited) in Assam suffered major disaster on 7 Oct 2019. The penstock pipe that takes water from the Umrangso dam to the hydropower house burst during early hours in Assam’s Dima Hasao district, and massive quantity of water erupted, a lot of it entered the power house, where four employees of NEEPCO were killed.
