= Dima Hasao district =

- District of Assam
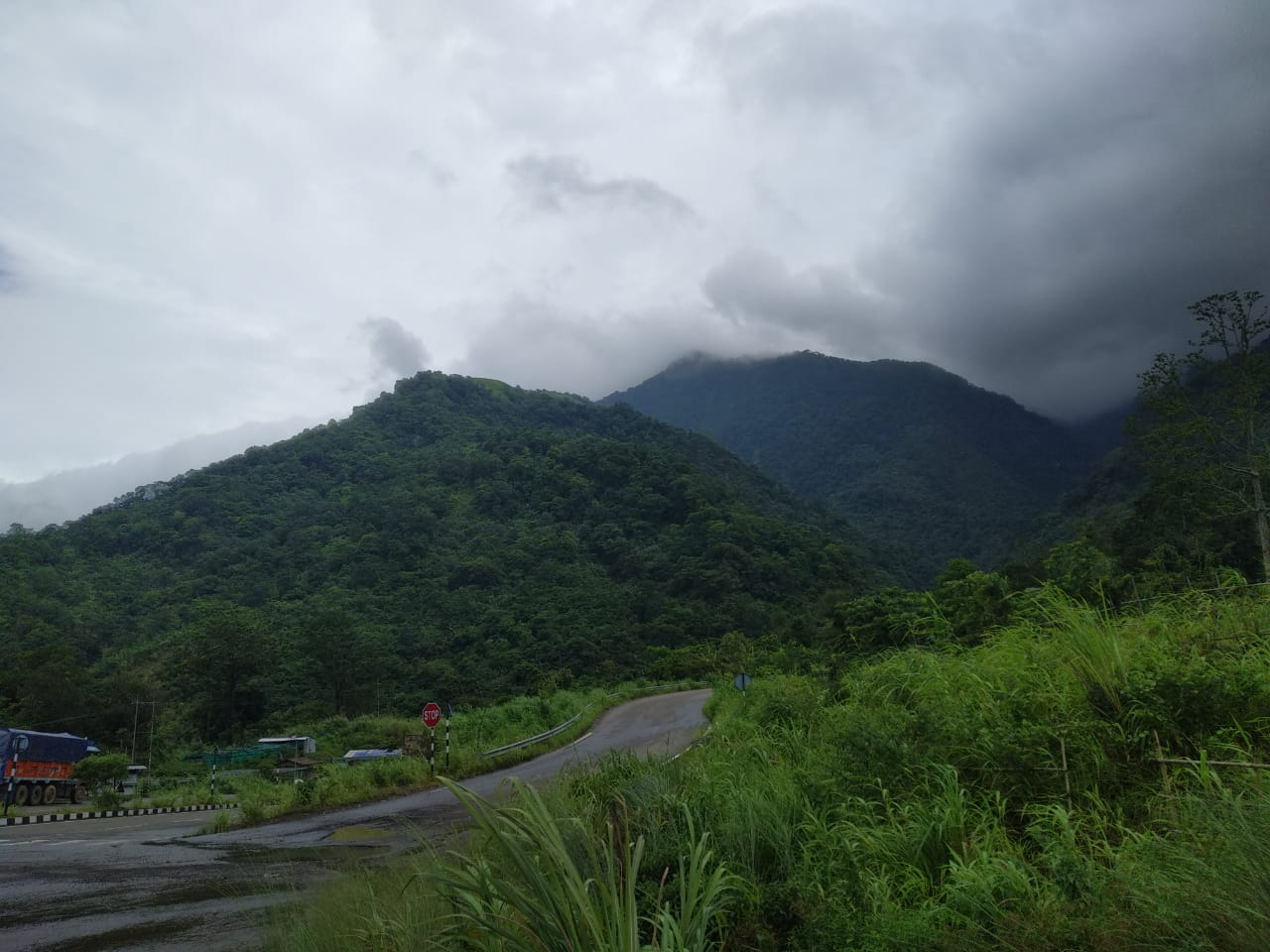
- Barail Range in Dima Hasao

- Location in Assam
- Coordinates: 25.18°N 93.03°E
- Country: India
- State: Assam
- Division: Central Assam
- District created: 2 February 1970
- Headquarters: Haflong

Government
  - Type: Autonomous district
  - Body: Dima Hasao Autonomous Council
  - Chief Executive Member: Debolal Gorlosa, BJP
  - Lok Sabha constituencies: Autonomous District (shared with Karbi Anglong & West Karbi Anglong district)
  - Vidhan Sabha constituencies: Haflong

Area
  - Total: 4,890 km^{2} (1,890 sq mi)
  - Rank: 2
- Elevation: 513 m (1,683 ft)

Population (2011)
  - Total: 214,102
  - Density: 43.667/km^{2} (113.10/sq mi)

Languages
  - Official: Dimasa and English
  - Most spoken: See § Languages
- Time zone: UTC+5:30 (IST)
- PIN: 788XXX
- Telephone code: 91 - (0) 03673
- ISO 3166 code: IN-AS
- Vehicle registration: AS-08
- Website: dimahasao.assam.gov.in

Dima Hasao district (/ˈdɪmə həˈsaʊ/), is an administrative district in the state of Assam, India. As of 2011, it is the least populous district of Assam.

Dima Hasao district is one of two autonomous hill districts of Assam. The district headquarters Haflong is the only hill station in the state.

== Etymology ==
"Dima Hasao" means "Dimasa Hills" in the Dimasa language.

== History ==
=== Dimasa kingdom ===
From c. 1500, Dima Hasao was part of the Dimasa Kingdom (or Kachar kingdom), with its capital at Maibang and Dimapur. As per Ahom Buranji, the kingdom stretched from the Kopili river in present-day Nagaon district to the Dhansiri river in present-day Golaghat district. This included parts of Cachar and North Cachar (Dima Hasao), the districts of Hojai, Nagaon, Golaghat and Karbi Anglong of Assam and Dimapur district in Nagaland.

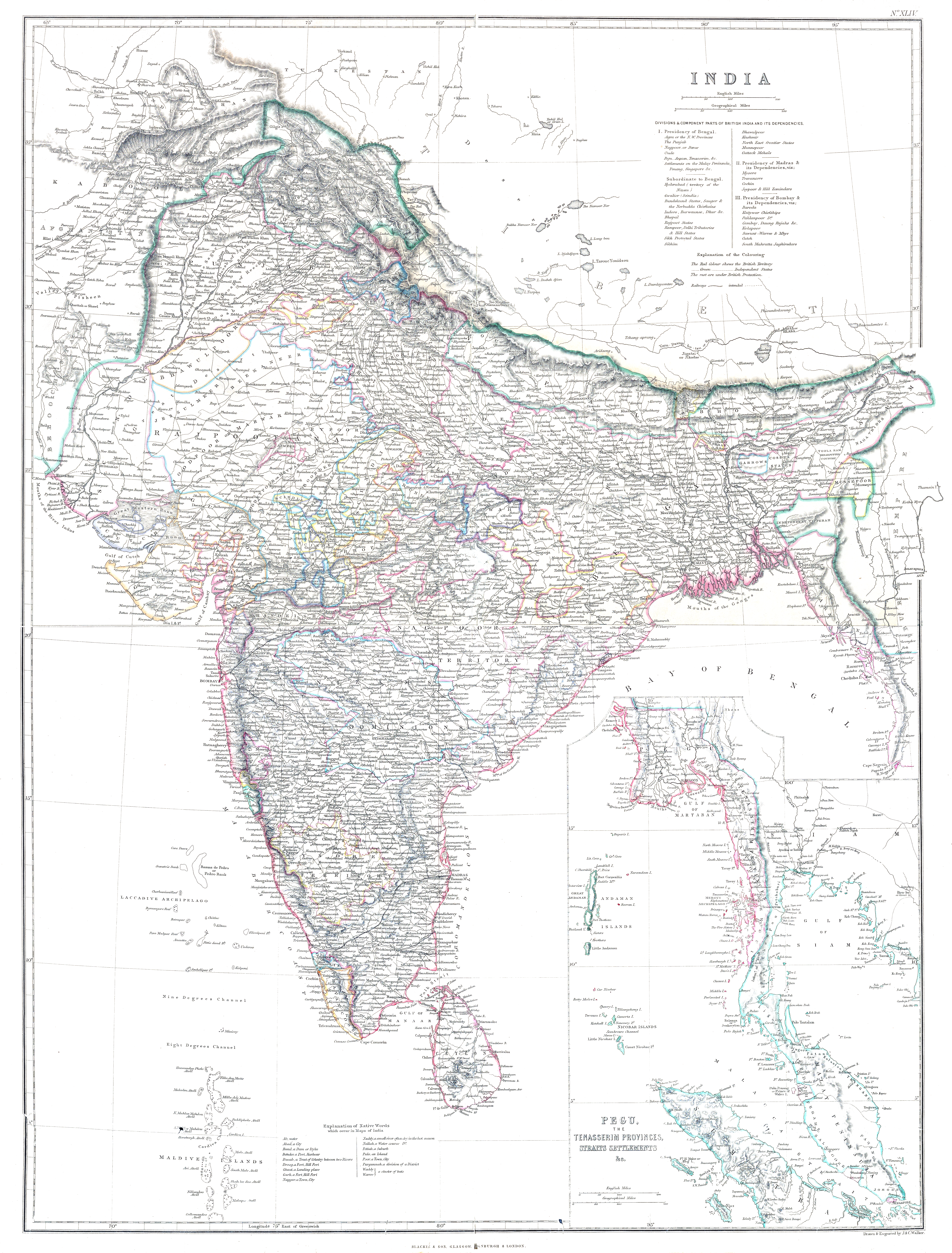
Tularam Senapati's territory depicted in the map of British India created by W. G. Blackie in 1860

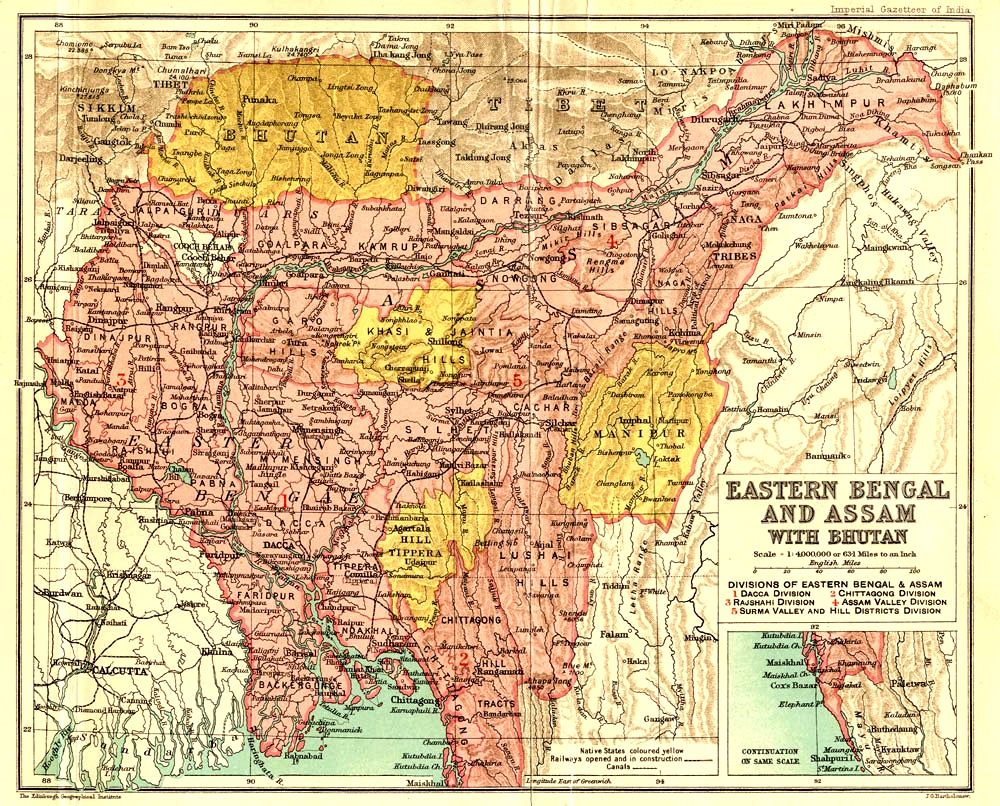
Map of Eastern Bengal and Assam created by J. G. Bartholomew in 1907. A part of Tularam's territory (stretching from the Jamuna River to Lumding) was transferred to Sivasagar district, and the rest (stretching from Lumding to Maibang) was transferred to Cachar district.

In the colonial period, Khaspur in present-day Cachar district was the administrative centre. However, an internal schism led to the division of the old Kachar Kingdom into two parts. The last Dimasa king, Govinda Chandra Hasnusa, assigned Kashi Chandra the hilly tract of Kachar (i.e. the area between the Mahur River and the Naga Hills in the south, the Doyang River on the west, the Dhansiri River on the east and the Jamuna river in the north) for administrative purposes. Soon, the latter declared his independence over the hilly portion. That led to the treacherous murder of Kashi Chandra by Raja Govinda Chandra Hasnusa. Incensed, the son of Kashi Chandra, Tularam Senapati, incessantly created political turbulence, asserting his sovereignty over the hilly portion of the Kachar Kingdom. Finally, with British assistance, Tularam succeeded in carving out his own territory from the Kachar Kingdom. David Scott, agent to the British Raj in 1829 made an arrangement to recognise Tularam as the ruler of the hilly tract of Kachar. In 1850, Tularam died, and the frequent Angami raids and a grave incident at Semkhor village paved the way to extend British influence over Tularam's territory. In 1852, his territory was annexed and made part of the Nowgong district of British Assam as a subdivision, with Asalu as its headquarters. (Note: In the given article published by Eastern Mirror, it has not been mentioned which area had been annexed to the Nowgong district as a subdivision in 1852. But, since Asalu has historically been a part of Tularam's territory, it can be implied that the same territory was annexed to the Nowgong district.)

=== British administration ===
In 1866, this sub-division was abolished and apportioned into three parts among the Cachar, Naga Hills district, and Nowgong district. The present area of the Dima Hasao district was included in the old Cachar district. In 1880, this portion was constituted into a sub-division with headquarters at Gunjung under Cachar district. This headquarters was shifted to Haflong in 1895. Since then, Haflong continued to be the headquarters till 1951.

=== Since Indian independence ===
On 17 November 1951, United Mikir and North Cachar Hills District was created with area occupying present-day Dima Hasao district, Karbi Anglong and West Karbi Anglong district. On 2 February 1970, the government declared an independent administrative district, viz. North Cachar Hills District with the geographical boundary of present-day Dimapur Hasao district. On 30 March 2010, the district was further renamed to Dima Hasao district.

== Geography ==
The district headquarters are located at Haflong. Dima Hasao district occupies an area of 4,888 square kilometres (1,887 sq mi), It is the second-largest district of Assam after Karbi Anglong. Dima Hasao District is surrounded by Karbi Anglong district and Nagaland on the northeast, Manipur on the east, Hojai District to the north, West Karbi Anglong district on the northwest, Meghalaya on the west and Cachar district in the south.

== Demographics ==
Historical population
Year	Pop.	±% p.a.
1901	40,812	—
1911	27,296	−3.94%
1921	28,913	+0.58%
1931	32,844	+1.28%
1941	37,361	+1.30%
1951	39,663	+0.60%
1961	54,319	+3.19%
1971	76,047	+3.42%
1991	150,801	+3.48%
2001	188,079	+2.23%
2011	214,102	+1.30%

=== Population ===
According to the 2011 census, Dima Hasao had a population of 214,102, giving it a ranking of 588th in India (out of a total of 640). The district had a population density of 44 inhabitants per square kilometre (110/sq mi). Its population growth rate over the decade 2001-2011 was 13.53%. Dima Hasao had a sex ratio of 931 females for every 1000 males and a literacy rate of 78.99%.

==== Ethnic groups ====
Dima Hasao is one of the three hill districts in Assam with a tribal majority population, the others being Karbi Anglong and West Karbi Anglong. The tribal population in Dima Hasao accounts for about 70.92% of the total population of the district according to the 2011 census, the highest percentage in the state, including Dimasa Kachari, Zeme Naga, Hmar, Kuki, Karbi, Khasi, Hrangkhol and Biate. Scheduled Castes are 2.02%. Non-tribal communities includes Bengalis, Nepalis, Hindi-speakers and few other communities who have made the district their home.

Religions in Dima Hasao district (2011)
Religion	Percent
Hinduism	67.07%
Christianity	29.57%
Islam	2.04%
Others (Tribal religion)	0.55%
Other or not stated	0.77%

Block	Hindu	Christian	Other
Umrangso	37,307	10,990	1,655
Haflong	45,105	28,594	1,985
Mahur	10,662	21,428	1,896
Maibong	50,519	2,298	753

As of the 2011 census, 67.07% of the population are Hindus, 29.57% Christians and 2.04% Muslims.

Ethnic Group	Decadal growth rate	2001	2011	Religion (2001)	Religion (2011)
Total	+13.83%	188,079	214,102	Hindu - 69.91%	Hindu - 67.07%
Dimasa	+14.83%	64,881	74,502	Hindu - 98.73%	Hindu - 99.19%
Kuki	+43.69%	16,757	24,079	Christian - 91.98%, Hindu - 7.56%	Christian - 93.17%, Hindu - 6.03%
Naga	+21.98%	17,078	20,832	Christian - 52.20%, Hindu - 43.72%, Animist - 3.43%	Christian - 53.67%, Hindu - 40.46%, Animist - 5.14%
Hmar	+8.7%	13,863	15,070	Christian - 98.71%	Christian - 99.18%
Karbi	+16.59%	7,973	9,296	Hindu - 63.18%, Christian - 36.52%	Hindu - 50.77%, Christian - 48.69%
Khasi	+17.89%	3,157	3,722	Christian - 95.31%	Christian - 96.94%
Smaller tribes	-8.6%	4,719	4,342	Christian - 59.00%, Hindu - 38.12%	Christian - 62.92%, Hindu - 34.94%
Non-tribal	+3.41%	59,651	61,686	Hindu - 86.57%, Muslim - 7.34%, Christian - 4.57%	Hindu - 85.80%, Muslim - 6.50%, Christian - 5.57%

=== Languages ===
Languages of Dima Hasao (2011)
1. Dimasa (35.7%)
2. Bengali (11.8%)
3. Zeme (9.65%)
4. Hmar (7.65%)
5. Nepali (6.36%)
6. Kuki (5.11%)
7. Karbi (4.46%)
8. Hindi (3.14%)
9. Khasi (1.93%)
10. Assamese (1.89%)
11. Others (12.3%)

At the time of the 2011 census, 35.72% of the district spoke Dimasa, 11.80% Bengali, 9.65% Zeme, 7.65% Hmar, 6.36% Nepali, 5.11% Kuki, 4.46% Karbi, 3.14% Hindi, 1.93% Khasi, 1.89% Assamese.

== Government and politics ==
=== Politics ===
Dima Hasao district is an autonomous district with Sixth Schedule status granted by the Constitution of India. The Dima Hasao District is administered by Dima Hasao Autonomous Council (DHADC). Members of the Autonomous Council (MAC) are elected by people of Dima Hasao. The Political party who has majority MACs form the ruling party. The Autonomous Council is a powerful body and almost all the department of government are under its control except the police and Law & Order is under Assam Government.

=== Administration ===
Dima Hasao comprises three subdivisions: Haflong, Maibang, and Diyungbra. The district consists of five Community Development Blocks: Jatinga Valley, Mahur; Diyung Valley, Maibang; Harangajao ITD Block, Harangajao; Diyungbra ITD Block, Diyungmukh; and New Sangbar, Sangbar.

== Economy ==
In 2006, the Indian government named Dima Hasao one of the country's 250 most backward districts (out of a total of 640). It is one of the eleven districts in Assam currently receiving funds from the Backward Regions Grant Fund Programme (BRGF).

=== Energy ===
Kopili Hydro Electric Project is a power project near Umrangso, involving two dams on Kopili river and Umrong nalla, a tributary of Kopili. There are two power stations as part of Kopili HEP, Khandong Stage I & II (75 MW) and Kopili Stage I & II (200 MW), with total output of 275 MW.

== Tourism ==
=== Places of interest ===
- Jatinga village

The village Jatinga is known for mysterious 'suicide of birds', between the months of September and November. Large number of tourists visit that time of the year to witness the phenomenon.

- Panimur waterfall

Panimur is also located in the Dima Hasao district of Assam, India. It is most famous for the Panimur Waterfall, also known as the Niagara of Northeast, which forms from the Kopili River as it flows over rocky terrain, creating a wide, cascading waterfall that is a major attraction for tourists and photographers. Additionally, the surrounding areas offer unique opportunities for eco-tourism and adventure activities, making it a favourite among explorers.

- Maibang

The town of Maibang is notable for its rock-cut temple carved out of a single black sandstone in triangular dimension. It houses the Hindu goddess Ranachandi or Mahamaya. The town was the capital of the Dimasa Kingdom in the 16th century.

- Umrangso

Scenic view of Umrangso water reservoir

Notable for its hydroelectric power project and wildlife reserves, the town of Umrangso is a destination for sightseeing, fishing, camping and trekking. It is a popular resting place of the Amur falcon, and it also host the annual Falcon Festival for the same.

- Garampani

The Garampani settlement, which is also known for its hot-springs, is situated 10 km from Umrangso.

- Tumjang Peak

Tumjang Peak is a spectacular mountain peak in the Barail Range known for its mist-covered hills, dense forests, panoramic mountain views and trekking opportunities.

== Education ==
Average literacy rate of Dima Hasao in 2011 were 77.54% compared to 67.62% of 2001. All schools of Dima Hasao are run by the state government or private organisations. English is the primary languages of instruction in most of the schools. The schools are recognised either by the Board of Secondary Education, Assam, the Assam Higher Secondary Education Council, or the Central Board of Secondary Education. All Dima Hasao colleges are affiliated to Assam University, a central university, which imparts education in both the general as well as professional streams.

=== College ===
- Haflong Government College, Haflong

=== Schools ===
- Ever Green High School, Maibang

== Media ==
=== Television ===
Channel	Year founded	Language	Owned by	Ref
NDH (News Dima Hasao)		Dimasa, Hindi, English	Viraj Nag	
Assam Talks		Assamese	Mahmadhul Hussan	
News Live		Assamese	Swadeep Hasam	
News Time Assam		Assamese	Anup Biswas	
Prag News		Assamese		
DY365		Assamese	Samsul Alam	
NKTV		Assamese	Monku Das	
Hills Live TV				
DD News		English, Hindi and Assamese	Suroj Barman	
Pratidin Times		Assamese	Pankaj Tumung	

=== Radio ===
- All India Radio, Akashvani Haflong broadcasts from Haflong at 100.02 megahertz on FM band.

== Notable place ==
- Haflong
- Maibang
- Panimur
- Umrangso

== See also ==
- List of districts of Assam
- 2024 Dima Hasao Autonomous Council Election

== Sources ==
- Bhattacharjee, J B (1987). "The Economic Content of the Medieval State Formation Processes among the Dimasas of North East India". Proceedings of the Indian History Congress. 48: 222–225. ISSN 2249-1937. JSTOR 44141683.
- Phukan, J. N. (1992), "Chapter III The Tai-Ahom Power in Assam", in Barpujari, H. K. (ed.), The Comprehensive History of Assam, vol. II, Guwahati: Assam Publication Board, pp. 49–60
- Ramirez, Philippe (2007), "Politico-ritual variations on the Assamese fringes: Do social systems exist?", in Sadan, Mandy; Robinne., François (eds.), Social Dynamics in the Highlands of Southeast Asia Reconsidering Political Systems of Highland Burma, Boston: Brill, pp. 91–107
- Shin, Jae-Eun (2020). "Descending from demons, ascending to kshatriyas: Genealogical claims and political process in pre-modern Northeast India, The Chutiyas and the Dimasas". The Indian Economic and Social History Review. 57 (1): 49–75. doi:10.1177/0019464619894134. S2CID 213213265.
