= Prem Garg =

Indian businessman

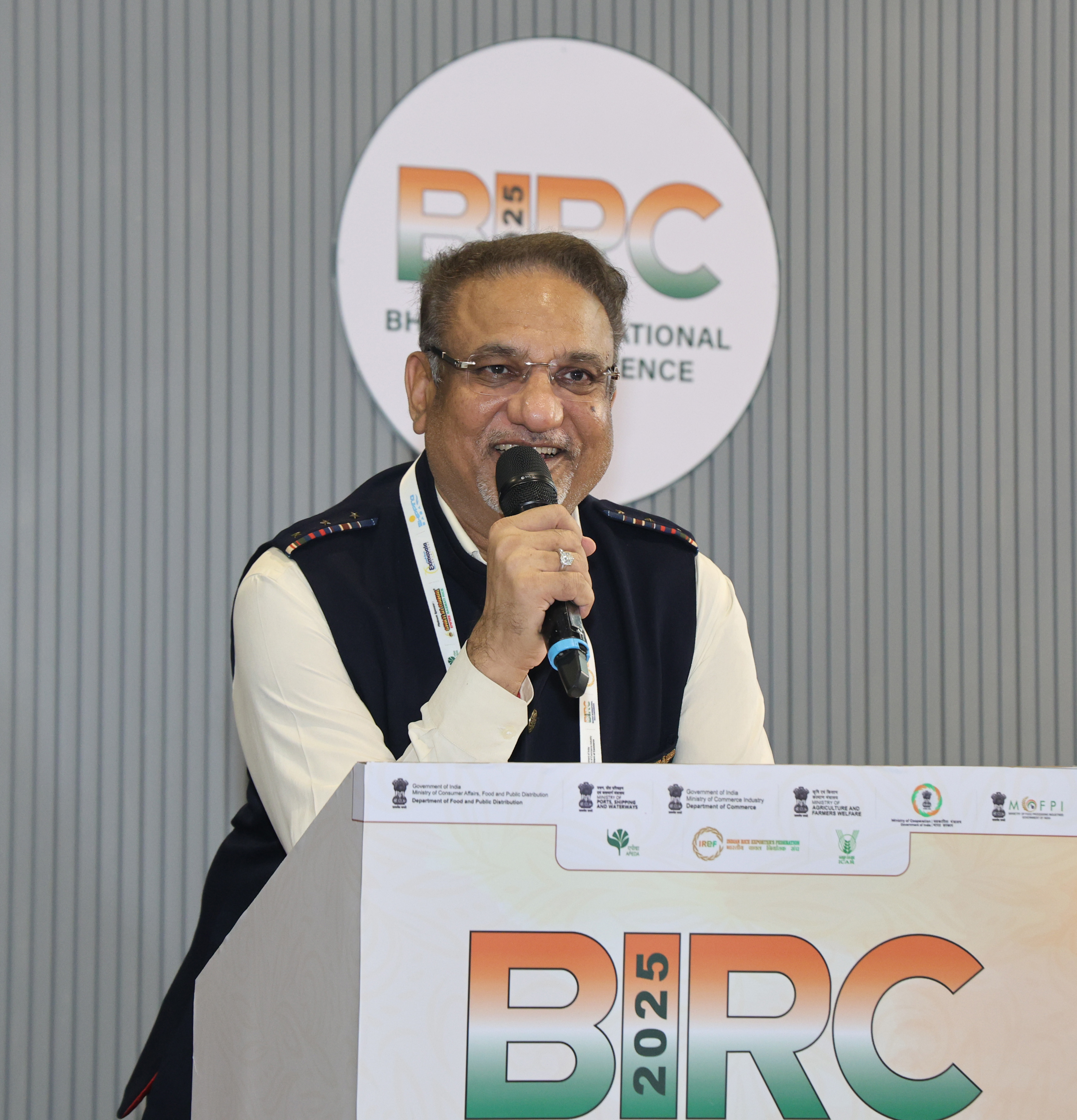
- Prem Garg during BIRC Summit 2025
- Born: 1963 (age 62–63); Delhi
- Occupations: industrialist and entrepreneur
- Website: drpremgarg.in

Prem Garg is an Indian businessman. He is the national president of the Indian Rice Exporters Federation (IREF) and the chairman of the Shri Lal Mahal Group, established in 1907.

== Career ==
=== Indian Rice Exporters Federation ===
In 2023, Garg founded the Indian Rice Exporters Federation (IREF), which says it represents more than 7,700 exporters, millers, and allied companies across India. In 2025, the IREF hosted the Bharat International Rice Conference, an event for trade and investment in the rice sector, in collaboration with the Ministry of Co-operation. In 2025, the Ministry of Commerce and Industry, through the Agricultural and Processed Food Products Export Development Authority, nominated Garg to the Non-Basmati Rice Development Fund Committee, which advises on export strategy and sector coordination.

=== Companies ===
Garg is the director and chairman of the Shri Lal Mahal Group, a rice export company.

Garg was convicted to seven years in prison for his role in the 2010 Belekeri Port Scam, which involved the illegal mining and export of iron ore, worth an estimated Rs 2,500 crore. A special court of MLAs and MPs from Karnataka State found Garg, the managing director of Shri Lal Mahal Ltd, guilty of criminal conspiracy, cheating and theft of seized iron ore.

Garg and his son, Devashish Garg, and their companies, Agrico Agbe Ltd and Little Rose Trading, are the subject of an ongoing criminal complaint in India for allegedly defrauding Ecobank Transnational Inc. of US$165 million. The alleged 2014 scheme involved Ecobank issuing credit to Garg's company, Agrico Agbe, for the purchase and import of rice into Nigeria. However, the rice consignments never arrived, and Ecobank was not repaid. Ecobank later learnt that the supplier, Little Rose Trading, was also a Garg-linked company and had forged shipping documents. Ecobank also filed complaints in Nigeria, where the Federal High Court in Lagos issued a warrant for the arrest and extradition of Garg, and the Dubai International Financial Centre, where it secured a ruling that was later overturned due to jurisdictional issues.

In 2016, the Directorate of Revenue Intelligence and the police arrested Garg and his son Devashish for allegedly smuggling gold. During a raid by the Directorate of Revenue Intelligence, 430 kg of gold worth Rs 120 crore (c. USD $13.2 million) was found at the offices of Garg's company of Shri Lal Mahal Ltd and his residential address. A statement by the Indian Government Enforcement Directorate said that Shri Lal Mahal and its owners, Prem Chand Garg and Anita Garg, his wife, had acquired proceeds of crime by diverting duty-free imported gold into the domestic market and evading customs duties "to the tune of Rs17.54 crore" (c. USD $2 million).

Garg and his company, Metal Africa Steel Products Ltd, are the subject of a criminal complaint in Nigeria for allegedly defrauding Access Bank of US$32 million in an import loan scheme. Following this complaint, Garg and his son Devashish Garg were added to Interpol's Red Notices and Diffusion Notices Database. Garg later filed a successful petition to remove their names from the list.

In 2021, the India Central Bureau of Investigation accused Garg of allegedly defrauding five banks, including the State Bank of India, of Rs 979.15 crore (c. USD $107 million) in an ongoing investigation.
