= N. Santosh Hegde =

Indian judge (born 1940)

Nitte Santosh Hegde
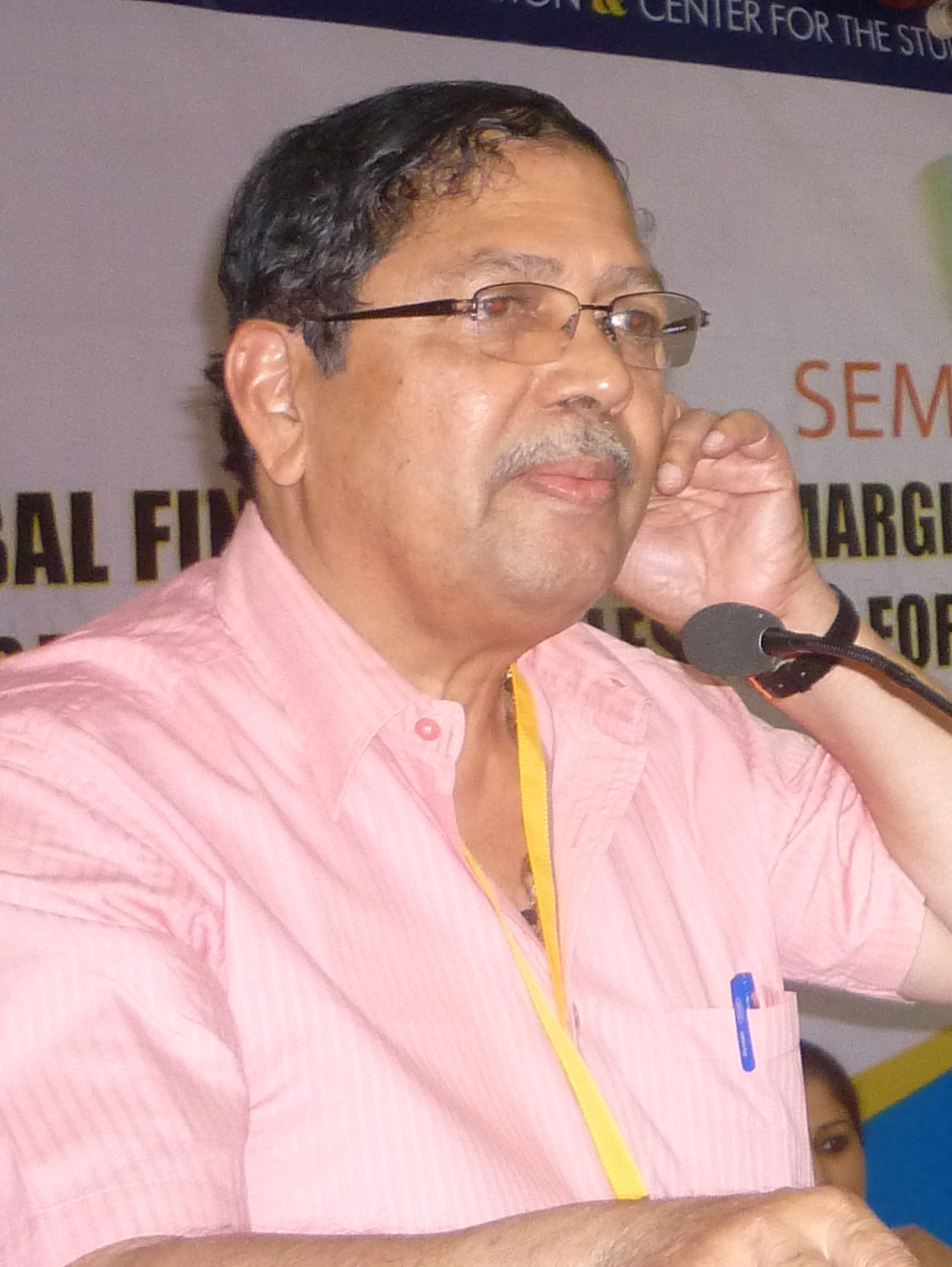

Karnataka Lokayukta
- In office 3 August 2006 – 3 August 2011
- Preceded by: N. Venkatachala
- Succeeded by: Shivaraj Patil

Judge of the Supreme Court of India
- In office 8 January 1999 – 16 June 2005

Solicitor General of India
- In office 10 April 1998 – 7 January 1999
- Preceded by: T. R. Andhyarujina
- Succeeded by: Harish Salve

Advocate General for Karnataka
- In office 15 February 1984 – 24 August 1988
- Preceded by: R. N. Narasimha Murthy
- Succeeded by: R. N. Narasimha Murthy

Personal details
- Born: 16 June 1940 (age 86) Nitte, Madras Presidency, British India (now in Karnataka, India)
- Spouse: Sharada
- Parent: K. S. Hegde (father)
- Education: University Law College
- Occupation: Lawyer, activist

Nitte Santosh Hegde (born 16 June 1940) is a former judge of the Supreme Court of India, former Solicitor General of India and was Lokayukta (ombudsman) for Karnataka State of India from 2006 to 2011.

== Early life ==
Santosh Hegde was born in a Tulu-speaking Bunt family to former judge of Supreme Court, K. S. Hegde and his wife Meenakshi Hegde (née Adyanthaya). He is one of six children born to the couple. He was born on 16 June 1940 in Nitte, Udupi district, Karnataka. He had his early education at St. Aloysius College, Mangalore and Madras Christian College in Madras. He completed his intermediate exam from St. Joseph's College, Bangalore and BSc degree from Central College of Bangalore. Hegde graduated with a law degree from Government Law College (now known as University Law College), Bangalore in 1965.

== Career ==
After completing apprenticeship training, Hegde enrolled as an advocate in January 1966 and was designated as senior advocate in May 1984. He was appointed the Advocate General for the state of Karnataka in February 1984 and held that position till August 1988. He worked as additional Solicitor General of the union of India from December 1989 to November 1990 and was re-appointed the Solicitor General of India on 25 April 1998. Nitte Santosh Hegde was appointed a judge of Supreme Court of India on 8 January 1999. He retired as judge of Supreme Court of India in June 2005. He was conferred honorary doctorate of law degree by Mangalore University in 2005. For a brief period he worked as Chairperson of Telecom Dispute Settlement Appellate Tribunal, New Delhi. Hegde was of the view that Telecom Regulatory Authority of India (TRAI) was not the authority for dispute resolution between customers and telecommunication service providers. He was appointed Lokayukta of Karnataka state on 3 August 2006 for a term of five years.

== Major anti-corruption cases and investigations as Lok Ayukta of Karnataka ==
The Lok Ayukta had exposed major irregularities in mines in Bellary, including those owned by Obulapuram Mining Company and by G. Karunakara Reddy, G. Janardhana Reddy and G. Somashekara Reddy who were ministers in the Government of Karnataka. He has expressed concern about illegal mining taking place in state of Karnataka which have deep repercussions for ecology and to exchequer of state. A report constituted by the Lok Ayukta uncovered major violations and systemic corruption in iron-ore mining in Bellary. There were violations in the allowed geography, encroachment of forest land, massive underpayment of state mining royalties relative to the market price of iron ore and systematic starvation of government mining entities. The damage to public interest was so serious that he recommended banning all exports of iron ore and limiting iron ore production for captive production of iron and steel.

== Controversies ==
- He was alleged to have pressured Chief Minister of Karnataka to remove then Bruhat Bangalore Mahanagara Palike (BBMP) commissioner S. Subramanya. Subramanya was heading the BBMP which was held responsible for bad maintenance of Bangalore, including drowning accidents during monsoon.
- Some people have questioned his political motives in timing his resignation a day before a Bharatiya Janata Party (BJP) state government convention, though he has not been aligned with any particular political party over the course of his career.

== Resignation from post of Lok Ayukta ==
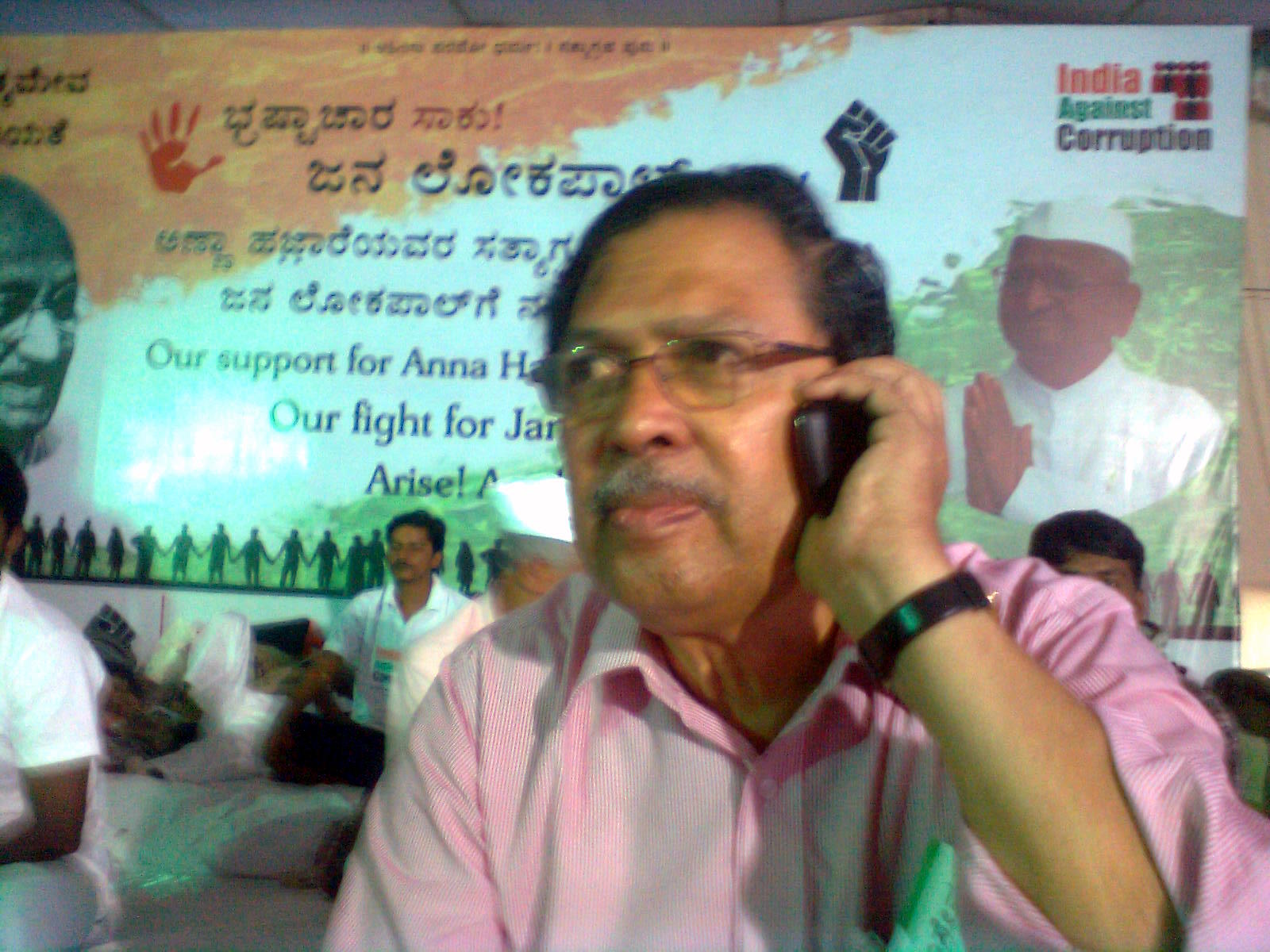
Mr. Hegde at Freedom Park Bangalore supporting Anna Hazare's protest for strong Jan Lokpal bill. This photograph was taken after his retirement as Lokayukta.

Hegde resigned from the Lokayukta position on 23 June 2010 after an officer (Deputy Conservator of Forests R Gokul) was suspended by order of minister J. Krishna Palemar and he felt powerless to help. He expressed inability to be effective in his anti-corruption mandate owing to a non-cooperative Government of Karnataka. After the resignation, he stated:

A cabinet minister wanted an officer to be suspended for having exposed attempts to export illegal iron ore from Belekeri port that was seized by our team in a raid on 20 March. When the officer sought my help, I could not do anything. Besides this, all officers against whom I conducted raids and suspended, have been reinstated.

Amid media speculation that the ports minister Palemar had recommended Gokul's suspension on behalf of some politicians with business interests, Palemar defended his recommendation to suspend Gokul since he failed to attend a meeting, for it raised suspicions that he may be involved in the scam himself. In fact, in a press meeting, Hegde indicated that:

The whole idea was if Gokul is suspended even for a day, a new investigating officer can be appointed and a scam of this stature which runs to thousands of crores can be shut. ... I couldn’t do anything for [Gokul] who had done the investigation going out of his way. I was very disturbed and couldn’t sleep for two days. I told my wife and decided to resign on Wednesday.

The matter, which is being called the Belekeri port scam, relates to 3.5 million tons of illegal iron ore, belonging to the powerful mining lobby headed by G. Janardhana Reddy, that was ready to be exported from Belekeri port. After Gokul seized the ore and the high court refused to permit its export without appropriate papers, a large part of it was surreptitiously exported from the port. Hegde's resignation sought to underline the helplessness of the advisory post of the Lokayukta in such situations.

After persistent protests and public pressure Karnataka Chief Minister Yeddyurappa admitted to an illegal iron-ore export racket at Belekeri Port involving 35 lakh metric tonnes of iron ore.

Justice Hegde withdrew his resignation and agreed to continue in the post of Lok Ayukta after persuasion from National leadership of the BJP. The party risked a major embarrassment in the BJP ruled Karnataka State government by allowing an upright person in public service to leave office, though All India Congress Committee general secretary B K Hariprasad said that "Hegde's actions prove that he is a BJP man".

== Retirement and after ==
He retired as Lokayukta of Karnataka on 2 August 2011. Subsequently, he joined the anti-corruption movement launched by Anna Hazare in 2011 as a core member of Team Anna. In August 2012, he left Team Anna and refused to be part of it after the team decided to go political.
