= Belekeri port scam =

The Belekeri port scam relates to 3.5 million tons of confiscated iron ore that was exported illegally from Belekeri port near Karwar in Karnataka, India. After Deputy Conservator of Forests R. Gokul seized the ore and the high court refused to permit it to be exported, a large part of it was surreptitiously exported from the port. After persistent protests and public pressure, Karnataka Chief Minister Yeddyurappa, who was balancing political considerations with control of corruption, admitted to an illegal iron-ore export racket at Belekeri Port involving 35 lakh metric tonnes of iron ore. It is said that the scam was worth an estimated 60,000 crore rupees (US$12 billion).

This iron ore from the Bellary region is alleged to have been illegally mined after paying a minuscule royalty to the government. The major irregularities involve mines in Bellary, including those of Obulapuram Mining Company owned by G. Karunakara Reddy and G. Janardhana Reddy, who were ministers in the Government of Karnataka during B. S. Yeddyurappa's tenure. A report constituted by the Lokayukta uncovered major violations and systemic corruption in mining in Bellary, including in the allowed geography, encroachment of forest land, massive underpayment of state mining royalties relative to the market price of iron ore and systematic starvation of government mining entities. This report was finalized and prepared with inputs from the Income Tax Department's Commissionerate of Central Circle.

Justice N. Santosh Hegde resigned from the Lokayukta position on 23 June 2010 after an officer (Deputy Conservator of Forests R Gokul) was suspended by order of minister J. Krishna Palemar and he felt powerless to help. He expressed inability to be effective in his anti-corruption mandate owing to a non-cooperative Government of Karnataka. Amid media speculation that the ports minister Krishna Palemar had recommended Gokul's suspension on behalf of some politicians with business interests, Palemar defended his recommendation to suspend Gokul, saying Gokul had failed to attend a meeting, and "this raised suspicions that he too might have had a role to play in this particular incident. Because of this I recommend that he be placed under suspension".

Hegde's resignation sought to underline the helplessness of the advisory post of the Lokayukta in such situations. The resignation has brought considerable public attention on the scam, whose existence the government has also been forced to admit.

== Related road damage, accidents and loss of lives ==
The lack of effective regulation in the mining and transport of iron ore has adversely impacted road safety in addition to the loss of revenue and environmental denudation due to illegal mining. Overloaded trucks carrying ore have caused hundreds of fatal accidents on the roadways leading to ports such as Belekeri. As many as 114 accidents were reported in 2007, and 174 in 2008. There are also reports of severe damage to the roads in Karnataka, including national highways NH-17, NH-48 and NH-63, near Shimoga.

=== Convictions ===
On 24 October 2025, a special court of MLAs and MPs from Karnataka State found multiple individuals guilty of charges of theft, criminal conspiracy, fraud and cheating. Congress MLA Sateesh Krishna Sail was sentenced to seven years imprisonment and was fined.

Prem Garg, the managing director of Shri Lal Mahal Ltd, was found guilty of criminal conspiracy, cheating, and theft of seized iron ore and sentenced to seven years in prison.

The other convictions were Mahesh J Biliye, Chetan Shah, K V Nagaraj, K V N Govindaraj, and Karapudi Mahesh Kumar.

== Lokayukta report of July 2011 ==
This report was finalized and prepared with inputs from the Income Tax Department's Commissionerate of Central Circle. The chapter 2 of the Lokayukta Report on illegal mining in Karnataka details the method in which the Belekeri Port was the anchor point of export of illegally mined iron ore. The report mentions the involvement of private companies – Shree Mallikarjun Shipping Pvt Ltd (SMSPL), Adani Enterprises Ltd, Salgaonkar Mining Industries Pvt Ltd, Dream Logistics Company India Pvt.Ltd and Raj Mahal Silks in large scale illegal exports of ore.

== See also ==
- Indian political scandals
- Corruption Perceptions Index
- Rent seeking
- Jan Lokpal Bill
