= Bramhani Industries =

Indian iron and steel company

Brahmani Industries Limited
- Type: Private
- Industry: Steel
- Founder: G. Janardhana Reddy
- Headquarters: Kadapa, Andhra Pradesh; India
- Area served: India
- Key people: Obulapuram Mining Company; G. Janardhana Reddy
- Products: Iron and steel
- Parent: Obulapuram Mining Company

Bramhani Industries Limited also known as Brahmani Steels and Bramhani Steels is an Indian iron and steel company promoted by Obulapuram Mining Company and G. Janardhana Reddy. The company is building a 1.7 metric tonnes per annum steel plant in Kadapa district of Andhra Pradesh. The company has announced plans to source state of the art steel equipment from China. The company has also proposed to build a 6 million metric ton steel plant in Bellary. JSW steel is said to be in talks for partial ownership of OMC. Bramhani steels and Obulapuram are linked to illegal mining of Iron ore in Karnataka.

== Political connections and resource allotment ==
Brahmani steels is reportedly in profit before producing any steel, owing to iron-ore sales from captive mines allotted by the Andhra Pradesh Government. Former Andhra Pradesh Chief minister Y. S. Rajasekhara Reddy allotted 10,670 acres (43.2 km^{2}) of land to Brahmani steels at a rate of Rs 18,500 per acre in Kadapa. There is also an ongoing controversy in the allotment of water to Brahmani Steels in Kadapa at the expense of Rayalaseema Thermal Power Station (RTPS). Y. S. Jagan Mohan Reddy, the son of Y. S. Rajasekhara Reddy and the claimant of his political legacy, is reported to have a business interest in Brahmani.
