= Agriexchange =

The Agriexchange portal of the Agricultural and Processed Food Products Export Development Authority (APEDA) is an online tool developed to provide all relevant information on Indian agricultural products to international buyers and market intelligence. It is made in collaboration with UNCTAD. In addition, the portal serves as a universal meeting place for exporters and importers online. Exporters can receive offers and trade enquiries online, and importers can make demands and specific queries.

APEDA is administered by the Ministry of Commerce, Government of India.
