= Y. Srilakshmi =

Indian civil servant

Yerra Srilakshmi (born 15 July 1966) is an officer of the Indian Administrative Service (IAS) belonging to 1988 batch. Srilakshmi was the former Andhra Pradesh Secretary for Industries, she was then appointed by the Telangana as a Special Chief Secretary Chief Secretary of State Government Institutions. In December 2020 she shifted back to the Andhra Pradesh government and was appointed as the Secretary for Municipal Administration and Urban Development.

Srilakshmi has been subject to allegations of corruption and is under investigation for involvement in various controversial decisions and has been jailed for the same, being only let out on grounds of 'ill health'.

== Cases which are under court trial ==
The Central Bureau of Investigation (CBI) arrested V. D. Rajagopal and Y. Srilakshmi, as the third and fourth accused respectively in the investigation into illegal mining by Obulapuram Mining Company. The permission for mining in Anantapur was for captive mining, i.e. the ore mined in that region is to be used in the local steel plant and not to be exported. Srilakshmi is accused of dropping the term "captive mining" in the final order approving a mining license to Obulapuram. Srilakshmi suggested that this was done at the insistence of the former Minister of Mines and current Telangana minister Sabitha Indra Reddy. However the CBI defended the Home minister, who is a senior local politician of the ruling Congress party. She was suspended from the IAS after 48 hours of police custody. She received conditional bail on 2 December 2011. The Andhra Pradesh High Court cancelled the bail on 2 January 2012 and Srilakshmi was taken into judicial custody. Srilakshmi was again granted interim bail on 9 October 2012 till 20 January 2013 with a Rs. 50,000 bond.

== CBI chargesheet in OMC case ==
The CBI alleged that Srilakshmi and Rajagopal demanded huge bribes from mine owners for prospecting licences. The CBI said in the chargesheet that Srilakshmi showed preferential treatment to Obulapuram Mining Company even with respect to the state owned Mineral Development Corporation (APMDC) for mining leases. On Srilakshmi, the charge sheet said that the senior IAS officer, as secretary of industries and commerce, also deliberately favoured the OMC in allotting mining area. The department had received more than 30 applications for lease of the six mining areas in the state and Srilakshmi deliberately allocated three areas to OMC. Among those rejected by her were Ch. Shasi Kumar (11 May 2005) and Gimpex Limited (26 April 2007). Favouring OMC, Srilakshmi wrote a letter to the ministry of mines that OMC was a bonafide firm.

== Conflict between AP state government ministers and IAS officers ==
The conflict between the ministers of the state of Andhra Pradesh, who are elected politicians and the officers from the IAS cadre came to public view in February 2012. The extent of corruption in the YSR government was even highlighted in US state department cables exposed by Wikileaks. In the inter-related investigations into the OMC mining scandal, the EMAAR-MGF Boulder Hills scam and the inquiry into the inordinate wealth of Y. S. Jagan Mohan Reddy allegedly accumulated as a quid-pro-quo for favours received from the Y.S. Rajasekhara Reddy government, the CBI has focused on various IAS officers. IAS officers from Andhra Pradesh including Srilakshmi, Rajagopal, B. P. Acharya, L. V. Subrahmanyam, K. V. Rao, K. Ratna Prabha, etc., have been arrested, charge-sheeted or have been questioned by the CBI in the investigation.

The AP IAS Officers Association alleged that they were made scapegoats for the decisions forced by the supervising ministers. They suggested that the decisions that incriminated the IAS officers took, could not have been implemented without the approval of concerned members of the Council of Ministers. The officers have challenged the CBI procedures in these arrests. While opposition political parties have suggested that the IAS officers name the ministers responsible for corruption in Andhra Pradesh, the Congress party functionaries have denied that the officers are being made scapegoats. Several other voices including the former vigilance commissioner, Ramachandra Samal, have reiterated that the system is deep in corruption.
