= Rice production in India =

Rice production in India is an important part of the economy of India.

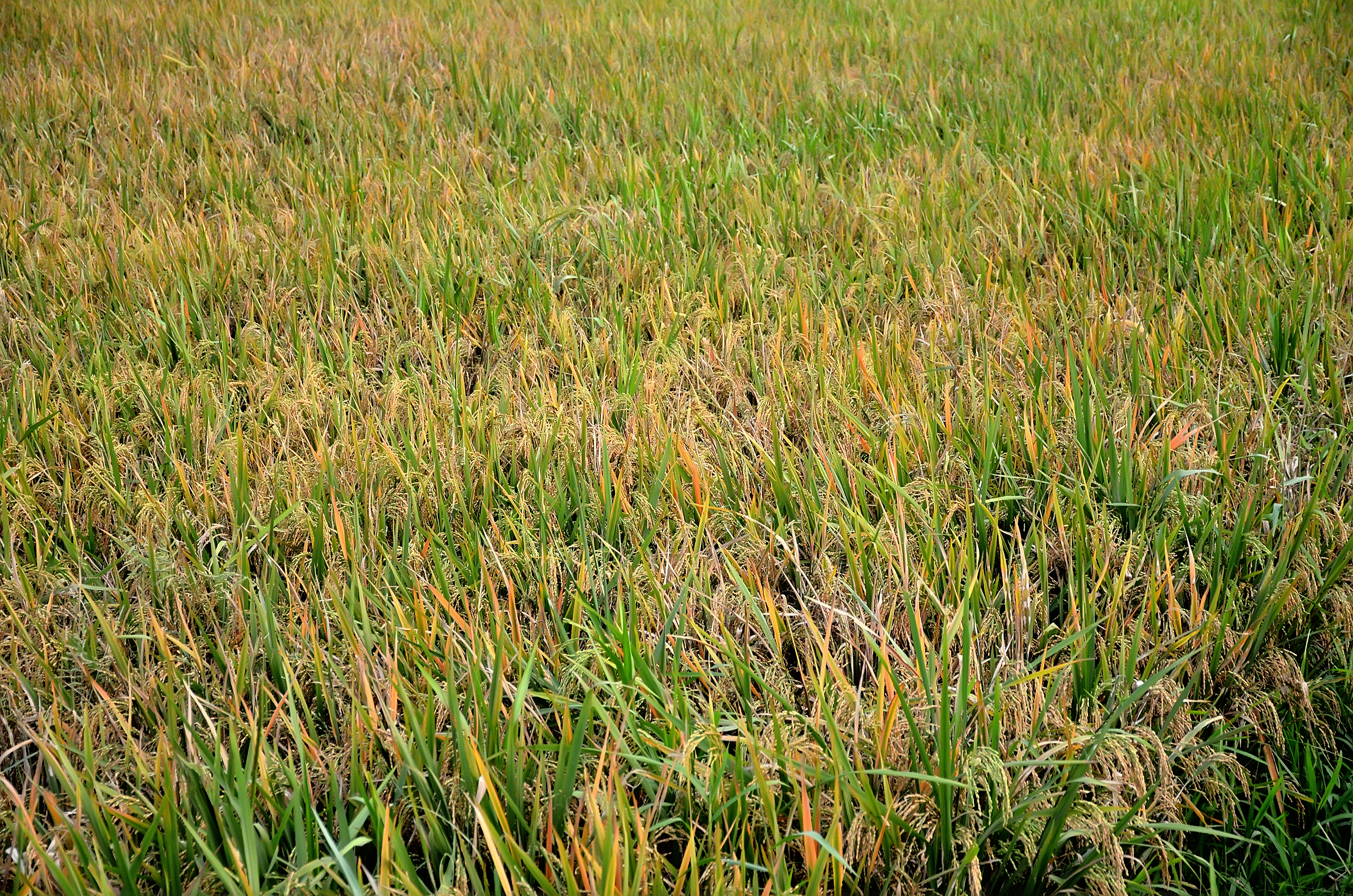
Dry paddy fields in South India

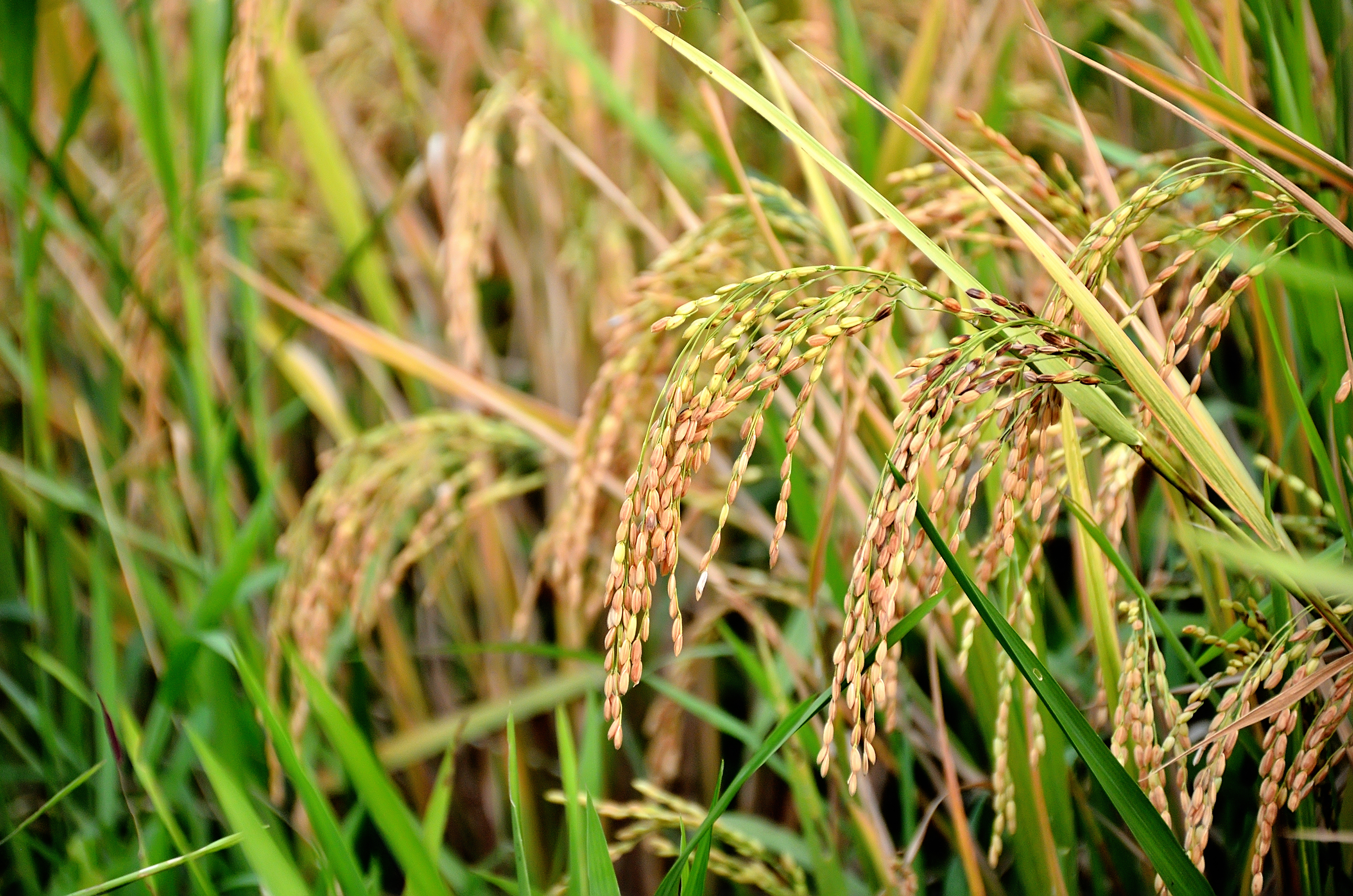
Mature rice, Thrissur, Kerala

India is the world's largest producer of rice, and the largest exporter of rice in the world. Production increased from 53.6 million tons in FY 1980 to 120 million tons in FY2020-21.

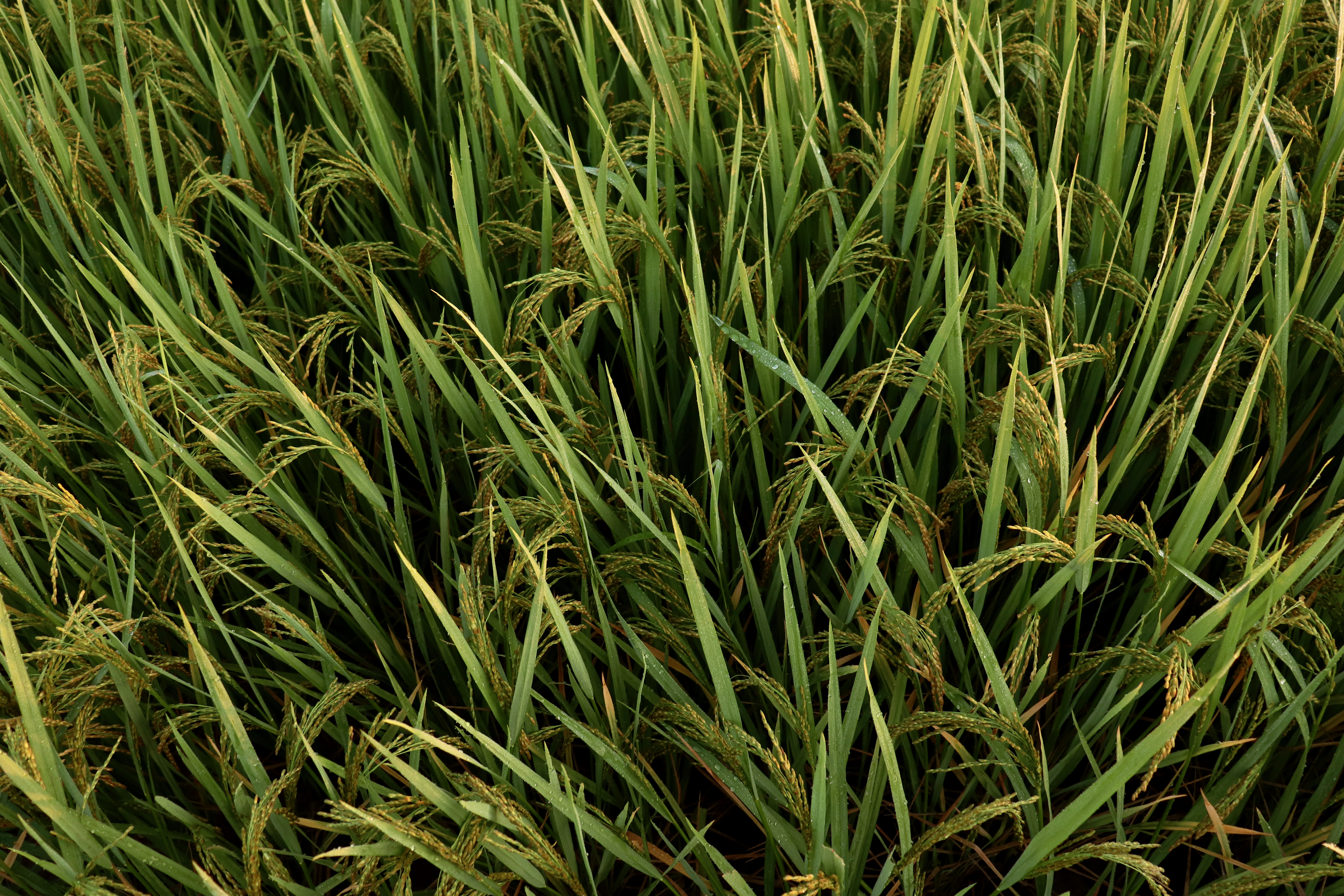
Paddy Field

Rice is one of the chief grains of India. Moreover, this country has the largest area under rice cultivation. As it is one of the principal food crops. It is the dominant crop of the country. India is one of the leading producers of this crop. Rice is the basic food crop and being a tropical plant, it flourishes comfortably in a hot and humid climate. Rice is mainly grown in rain-fed areas that receive heavy annual rainfall. That is why it is fundamentally a kharif crop in India. It demands a temperature of around 25 degrees Celsius and above, and rainfall of more than 100 cm (39 in). Rice is also grown through irrigation in those areas that receive less rainfall. Rice is the staple food of eastern and southern parts of India.

Rice can be cultivated by different methods based on the type of region. But in India, traditional methods are still in use for harvesting rice. The fields are initially plowed and fertilizer is applied which typically consists of cow dung, and then the field is smoothed. The seeds are transplanted by hand and then through proper irrigation, the seeds are cultivated. Rice grows on a variety of soils like silts, loams and gravels. It can tolerate alkaline as well as acid soils. However, clayey loam is well suited to the raising of this crop. Actually, the clayey soil can be easily converted into the mud in which rice seedlings can be transplanted easily. Proper care has to be taken as this crop thrives if the soil remains wet and is underwater during its growing years. Rice fields should be level and should have low mud walls for retaining water. In the plain areas, excess rainwater is allowed to inundate the rice fields and flow slowly. Rice raised in the well-watered lowland areas is known as lowland or wet rice. In the hilly areas, slopes are cut into terraces for the cultivation of rice. Thus, the rice grown in the hilly areas is known as dry or upland rice. The yield of upland rice per hectare is comparatively less than that of wet rice.

The regions cultivating this crop in India are distinguished as the western coastal strip, the eastern coastal strip, covering all the primary deltas, Assam plains and surrounding low hills, foothills and Terai region- along the Himalayas and states like West Bengal, Bihar, eastern Uttar Pradesh, eastern Madhya Pradesh, northern Andhra Pradesh and Odisha. India, being a land of the eternal growing season, and the deltas of the Ganges-Bramhaputra(in West Bengal), Kaveri River, Krishna River, Godavari River, Indravati River and Mahanadi River with a thick set-up of canal irrigation like Hirakud Dam and Indravati Dam, permits farmers to raise two, and in some pockets, even three crops a year. Irrigation has made even three crops a year possible. Irrigation has made it feasible even for Punjab and Haryana, known for their baked climate, to grow rice. They even export their excess to other states. Punjab and Haryana grow prized rice for export purposes. The hilly terraced fields from Kashmir to Assam are ideally suited for rice farming, with age-old hill irrigational conveniences. High yielding kinds, enhanced planting methods, promised irrigation water supply and mounting use of fertilizers have together led to beneficial and quick results. It is the rain fed-area that cuts down average yields per hectare.

In some states like West Bengal, Assam, and Orissa two crops of rice are raised in a year. The Winter season in northwestern India is extremely cold for rice. Rice is considered as the master crop of coastal India and in some regions of eastern India, where during the summer and monsoon seasons, both high temperature and heavy rainfall provide ideal conditions for the cultivation of rice. Almost all parts of India are suitable for raising rice during the summer season provided that water is available. Thus, rice is also raised even in those parts of western Uttar Pradesh, Punjab, and Haryana where low-level areas are waterlogged during the summer monsoon rainy season.

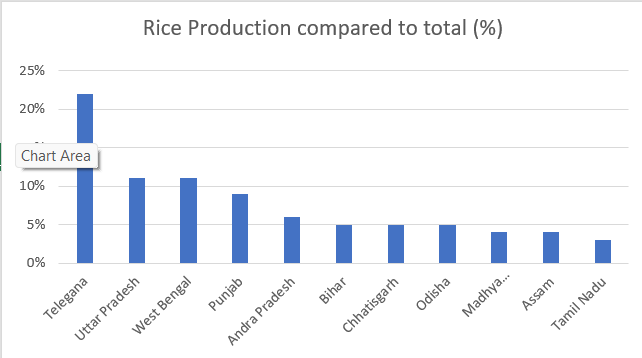
A graph showing the top states in terms of rice production

Winter rice crop is a long duration crop and summer rice crop is a short duration crop. At some places in the eastern and southern parts of India, rice crop of short duration is followed by the rice crop of long duration. Winter rice crop is raised preferably in low-lying areas that remain flooded mainly during the rainy season. Autumn rice is raised in Uttar Pradesh, Maharashtra, Rajasthan, Madhya Pradesh, Punjab, and Himachal Pradesh. Summer, autumn, and winter rice crops are raised in West Bengal, Andhra Pradesh, Assam, and Orissa. Summer rice crop is raised on a small scale and a small area. However, the winter rice crop is actually the leading rice crop accounting for a major portion of the total Hectare under rice in all seasons in the country. Moreover, in the last few years, several steps to augment yield per hectare were taken up very seriously at all levels. India ranks fourth in the production of wheat & second in the production of rice in the world. Favorable Geographical Condition for Wheat Cultivation: In India, wheat is a winter crop. Wheat requires a moderately cool climate with moderate rain. In India, it is grown in winter. It needs a temperature of 10 degrees C to 15 degrees C for its cultivation. It thrives well at an average temperature of 16-degree C. Warm and sunny weather is essential at the time of ripening.

== Rice production by year ==
Source: drdpat

SL	Year	Area (million hectares)	Production (million tonnes)	Yield (kg/hectare)
1.	1950-51	30.81	20.58	668
2.	1951-52	29.83	21.30	714
3.	1952-53	29.97	22.90	764
4.	1953-54	31.29	28.21	902
5.	1954-55	30.77	25.22	820
6.	1955-56	31.52	27.56	874
7.	1956-57	32.28	29.04	900
8.	1957-58	32.30	25.53	790
9.	1958-59	33.17	30.85	930
10.	1959-60	33.82	31.68	937
11.	1960-61	34.13	34.58	1,013
12.	1961-62	34.69	35.66	1,028
13.	1962-63	35.69	33.21	931
14.	1963-64	35.81	37.00	1,033
15.	1964-65	36.46	39.31	1,078
16.	1965-66	35.47	30.59	862
17.	1966-67	35.25	30.44	863
18.	1967-68	36.44	37.61	1,032
19.	1968-69	36.97	39.76	1,076
20.	1969-70	37.68	40.43	1,073
21.	1970-71	37.59	42.22	1,123
22.	1971-72	37.76	43.07	1,141
23.	1972-73	36.69	39.24	1,070
24.	1973-74	38.29	44.05	1,151
25.	1974-75	37.89	39.58	1,045
26.	1975-76	39.48	48.74	1,235
27.	1976-77	38.51	41.92	1,088
28.	1977-78	40.28	52.67	1,308
29.	1978-79	40.48	53.77	1,328
30.	1979-80	39.42	42.33	1,074
31.	1980-81	40.15	53.63	1,336
32.	1981-82	40.71	53.25	1,308
33.	1982-83	38.26	47.12	1,231
34.	1983-84	41.24	60.10	1,457
35.	1984-85	41.16	58.34	1,417
36.	1985-86	41.14	63.83	1,552
37.	1986-87	41.17	60.56	1,471
38.	1987-88	38.81	56.86	1,465
39.	1988-89	41.73	70.49	1,689
40.	1989-90	42.17	73.57	1,745
41.	1990-91	42.69	74.29	1,740
42.	1991-92	42.65	74.68	1,751
43.	1992-93	41.78	72.86	1,744
44.	1993-94	42.54	80.30	1,888
45.	1994-95	42.81	81.81	1,911
46.	1995-96	42.84	76.98	1,797
47.	1996-97	43.43	81.74	1,882
48.	1997-98	43.45	82.53	1,900
49.	1998-99	44.80	86.03	1,920
50.	1999-00	44.97	89.48	1,990

== Rice production by state ==
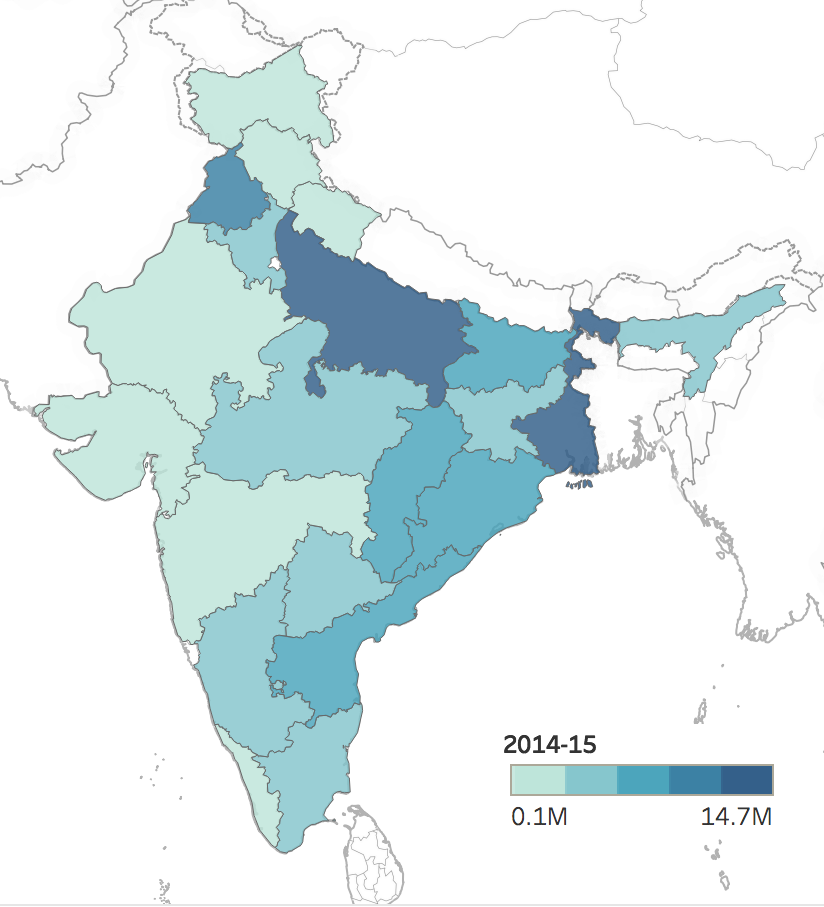
Rice production by Indian states

Rice production by states (million tons)
States	Rank (2014–15)	Actual production (2014–15)	% of country total (2014-15)	Cumulative % of country total (2014-15)	Average production (2010–11 to 2014–15)	Estimate (2015–16)
India	-	103.73	100.0%	100%	105.48	103.61
West Bengal	1	14.68	13.9%	14%	14.54	16.10
Uttar Pradesh	2	12.17	11.5%	25%	13.45	12.51
Punjab	3	11.11	10.5%	36%	11.03	11.64
Odisha	4	8.30	7.9%	44%	7.17	5.80
Andhra Pradesh	5	7.23	6.9%	51%	7.34	6.94
Bihar	6	6.36	6.0%	57%	5.93	6.11
Chhattisgarh	7	6.32	6.0%	63%	6.37	6.29
Tamil Nadu	8	5.73	5.4%	68%	5.68	5.72
Assam	9	5.22	4.9%	73%	4.91	5.12
Telangana	10	4.44	4.2%	77%	5.31	4.19
Haryana	11	4.01	3.8%	81%	3.84	4.18
Madhya Pradesh	12	3.63	3.4%	85%	2.65	3.49
Maharashtra	15	2.95	2.8%	94%	2.93	2.61
Gujarat	16	1.83	1.7%	96%	1.66	1.56
Uttarakhand	17	0.60	0.6%	96%	0.58	0.63
Kerala	18	0.56	0.5%	97%	0.53	0.70
Jammu & Kashmir	19	0.52	0.5%	97%	0.60	0.42
Rajasthan	20	0.37	0.4%	98%	0.28	0.35
Himachal Pradesh	21	0.13	0.1%	98%	0.13	0.10
Others	-	2.44	2.3%	100%	2.37	2.31

== Rice export from India ==
India is one of the biggest exporters of rice in the world.

=== Basmati rice ===
India is the leading exporter of Basmati Rice to the global market. In the financial year 2018–19, India exported around 4.4 million metric tons of Basmati rice worth US$4.7 billion.

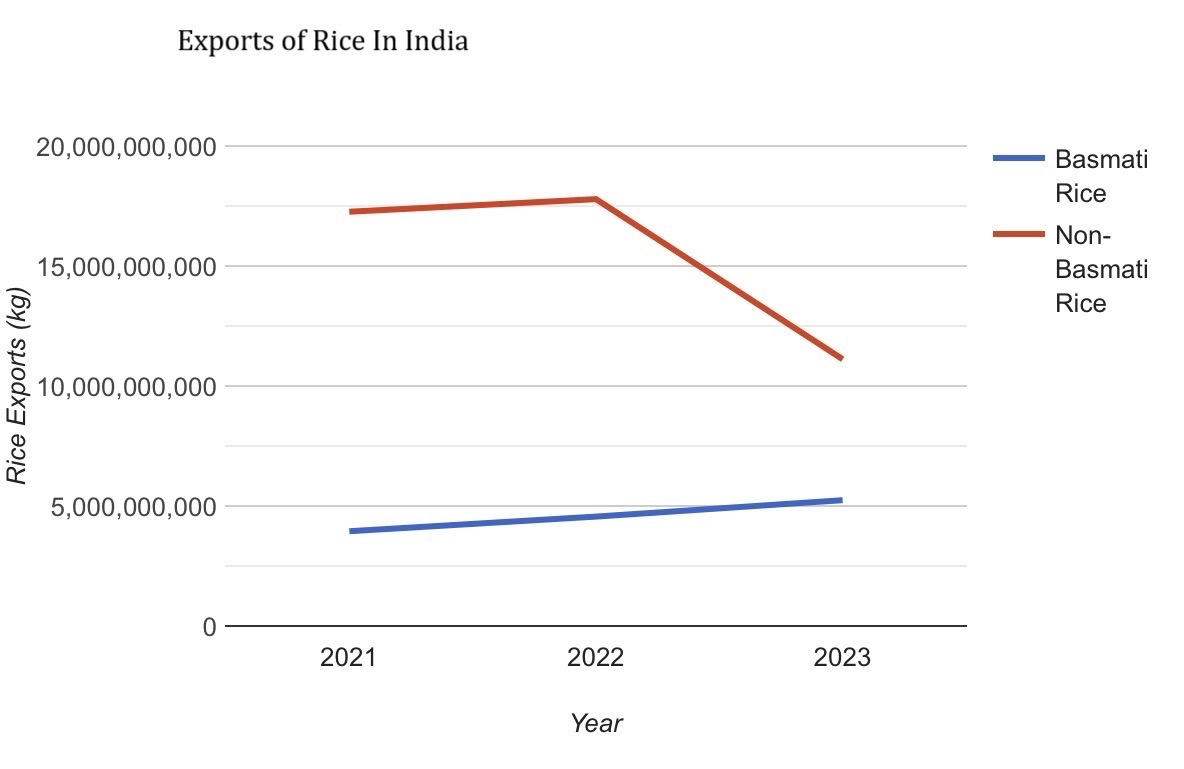
Graph showing exports by India of Basmati and non-Basmati rice from 2021 to 2023

The Indian states with the highest areas of Basmati rice under production are Jammu and Kashmir, Himachal Pradesh, Punjab, Haryana, Delhi, Uttarakhand and Western Uttar Pradesh.

In October 2026, the Indian Rice Exporters' Federation (IREF) organized the Bharat International Rice Conference (BIRC) at Bharat Mandapam in New Delhi. As part of the trade initiative, a "Global Rice Archive" showcased roughly 200 domestic and international rice strains, including regional specialty varieties such as Manipur's Chak-hao (black rice), Joha rice of Assam, and Kashmir's Mushbudji—to promote the export of non-Basmati agricultural produce.
