= National Highway 766EE (India) =

National Highway in India

National Highway 766EE
- Map of National Highway 766EE in red

Route information
- Auxiliary route of NH 66
- Length: 4.3 km (2.7 mi)

Major junctions
- East end: Hattikeri
- West end: Belekeri Port

Location
- Country: India
- States: Karnataka

Highway system
- Roads in India; Expressways; National; State; Asian
← NH 66	→ NH 66

National Highway 766EE, commonly referred to as NH 766EE is a national highway in India. It is a secondary route of National Highway 66. NH-766EE runs in the state of Karnataka in India.

== Route ==
NH766EE connects Hattikeri and Belekeri Port in the state of Karnataka.

== Junctions ==
NH 66 Terminal near Hattikeri.

== See also ==
- List of national highways in India
- List of national highways in India by state
