= Gangawati Assembly constituency =

Legislative Assembly constituency in Karnataka State, India

Coordinates: 15.44°N 76.53°E

Gangavathi
- Constituency No. 62 for the Karnataka Legislative Assembly

Constituency details
- Country: India
- Region: South India
- State: Karnataka
- Division: Kalaburagi
- District: Koppal
- Lok Sabha constituency: Koppal
- Established: 1951
- Total electors: 202,243
- Reservation: None

Member of Legislative Assembly
- 16th Karnataka Legislative Assembly
- Incumbent G. Janardhan Reddy
- Party: BJP
- Elected year: 2023
- Preceded by: Paranna Munavalli

Gangavathi Assembly constituency is one of the 224 Legislative Assembly constituencies of Karnataka in India.

It is part of Koppal district. It was previously part of Raichur district until 24 August 1997.

== Members of the Legislative Assembly ==
Election	Member	Party
1952	Hiremath. K. R	Independent politician
1957	Desai Bhimsain Rao	Indian National Congress
1962	Tirumaladeva Rayalu Rangadevarayalu	Indian National Congress
1967	T. D. Raya	Indian National Congress
1972	H. R. Sriramulu	Indian National Congress
1978	C. Yadave Rao Shesha Rao	Indian National Congress
1983	H. S. Muralidhar	Independent politician
1985	Gouli Mahadevappa	Janata Party
1989	Srirangadevarayalu	Indian National Congress
1994	Srirangadevarayalu	Indian National Congress
1999	Srirangadevarayalu	Indian National Congress
2004	Iqbal Ansari	Janata Dal
2008	Paranna Munavalli	Bharatiya Janata Party
2013	Iqbal Ansari	Janata Dal
2018	Paranna Munavalli	Bharatiya Janata Party
2023	G. Janardhana Reddy	Kalyana Rajya Pragathi Paksha

== Election results ==
=== Assembly Election 2023 ===
2023 Karnataka Legislative Assembly election : Gangawati
Party	Candidate	Votes	%	±%
KRPP	G. Janardhana Reddy	66,213	41.42	New
INC	Iqbal Ansari	57,947	36.25	▼4.25
BJP	Paranna Munavalli	29,167	18.25	▼27.66
JD(S)	Channakeshave Heriyaal Ramulu	1,212	0.76	▼8.86
NOTA	None of the above	426	0.27	▼0.83
Margin of victory		8,266	5.17	▼0.24
Turnout		160,046	79.14	▲3.22
Total valid votes		159,859		
Registered electors		202,243		▲4.21
KRPP gain from BJP		Swing	▼4.49	

=== Assembly Election 2018 ===
2018 Karnataka Legislative Assembly election : Gangawati
Party	Candidate	Votes	%	±%
BJP	Paranna Munavalli	67,617	45.91	▲23.59
INC	Iqbal Ansari	59,644	40.50	▲25.69
JD(S)	Kariyanna Sangati	14,161	9.62	▼34.48
NOTA	None of the above	1,615	1.10	New
CPI(M)	G. Nagaraj	1,045	0.71	New
Margin of victory		7,973	5.41	▼16.38
Turnout		147,353	75.92	▲2.56
Total valid votes		147,273		
Registered electors		194,079		▲13.59
BJP gain from JD(S)		Swing	▲1.81	

=== Assembly Election 2013 ===
2013 Karnataka Legislative Assembly election : Gangawati
Party	Candidate	Votes	%	±%
JD(S)	Iqbal Ansari	60,303	44.10	▲9.63
BJP	Paranna Munavalli	30,514	22.32	▼15.05
INC	H. R. Srinath	20,248	14.81	▼7.65
KJP	Basavaraj Patil Anvari	7,058	5.16	New
BSRCP	Pampanagowdru Police Patel	3,015	2.21	New
Independent	Sharanabasappa. S. Pan Shop	1,642	1.20	New
CPI(ML)L	Bharadvaj Subbarao	971	0.71	New
Pyramid Party of India	Vijayakumar. J	843	0.62	New
Margin of victory		29,789	21.79	▲18.89
Turnout		125,344	73.36	▲9.95
Total valid votes		136,729		
Registered electors		170,865		▲9.04
JD(S) gain from BJP		Swing	▲6.73	

=== Assembly Election 2008 ===
2008 Karnataka Legislative Assembly election : Gangawati
Party	Candidate	Votes	%	±%
BJP	Paranna Munavalli	37,121	37.37	▲5.86
JD(S)	Iqbal Ansari	34,236	34.47	▼0.05
INC	Nagappa Bhimappa Saloni	22,308	22.46	▼5.52
Independent	S. Hashumuddin Advocate	2,206	2.22	New
BSP	Mahabaleshwar Hasinal	1,038	1.05	▼0.25
Independent	Devakka Virupaxappa Valmiki	834	0.84	New
Margin of victory		2,885	2.90	▼0.11
Turnout		99,365	63.41	▼1.10
Total valid votes		99,322		
Registered electors		156,693		▼11.63
BJP gain from JD(S)		Swing	▲2.85	

=== Assembly Election 2004 ===
2004 Karnataka Legislative Assembly election : Gangawati
Party	Candidate	Votes	%	±%
JD(S)	Iqbal Ansari	39,486	34.52	▲30.68
BJP	H. Gire Gouda	36,044	31.51	▲0.62
INC	Srirangadevarayalu	32,001	27.98	▼22.09
JP	Ashoka Swami Herur	2,119	1.85	New
Kannada Nadu Party	Mahesh Hiremath	1,849	1.62	New
BSP	Krishna Laxmappa. L	1,488	1.30	▼1.51
CPI(ML)L	Bharadvaj. J	754	0.66	New
Margin of victory		3,442	3.01	▼16.17
Turnout		114,386	64.51	▲2.95
Total valid votes		114,381		
Registered electors		177,311		▲10.71
JD(S) gain from INC		Swing	▼15.55	

=== Assembly Election 1999 ===
1999 Karnataka Legislative Assembly election : Gangawati
Party	Candidate	Votes	%	±%
INC	Srirangadevarayalu	45,853	50.07	▲19.04
BJP	H. Gire Gouda	28,291	30.89	▲25.68
Independent	T. Janardhan	7,456	8.14	New
JD(S)	Nooruddin Quadri	3,521	3.84	New
BSP	Hanumanthappa Gunnal	2,572	2.81	New
Independent	Virupaksha Gouda Ayyana Gouda Police Patil	2,054	2.24	New
Independent	G. Krishna Swamy	963	1.05	New
Independent	Ginnis Hottepaksha Rangaswamy	872	0.95	New
Margin of victory		17,562	19.18	▲13.91
Turnout		98,591	61.56	▲0.68
Total valid votes		91,582		
Rejected ballots		7,009	7.11	▲3.60
Registered electors		160,151		▲14.57
INC hold		Swing	▲19.04	

=== Assembly Election 1994 ===
1994 Karnataka Legislative Assembly election : Gangawati
Party	Candidate	Votes	%	±%
INC	Srirangadevarayalu	25,478	31.03	▼32.43
JD	Gunjalli Rajaseekharappa Basappa	21,152	25.76	▼2.22
Independent	Girigouda Somashekhara Gouda	13,375	16.29	New
Independent	Gouli Mahadevappa	10,676	13.00	New
BJP	Shivasangaragouda Patil	4,280	5.21	▲3.24
INC	Pampanagouda Basanagouda Heroor	3,570	4.35	New
Independent	Mehar Pasha	1,604	1.95	New
Margin of victory		4,326	5.27	▼30.21
Turnout		85,100	60.88	▼2.69
Total valid votes		82,111		
Rejected ballots		2,989	3.51	▼4.72
Registered electors		139,782		▲3.14
INC hold		Swing	▼32.43	

=== Assembly Election 1989 ===
1989 Karnataka Legislative Assembly election : Gangawati
Party	Candidate	Votes	%	±%
INC	Srirangadevarayalu	50,174	63.46	▲18.30
JD	Gouli Mahadevappa	22,125	27.98	New
JP	Doddabasappa Rachappa Alias Babu Siddapuru	3,092	3.91	New
BJP	Bagodi Veerabhadrappa	1,555	1.97	New
Kranti Sabha	Thippeswamy Alias Thipperudraswamy	785	0.99	New
Independent	Naryana Illur	742	0.94	New
Margin of victory		28,049	35.48	▲26.56
Turnout		86,150	63.57	▼3.03
Total valid votes		79,062		
Rejected ballots		7,088	8.23	▲5.46
Registered electors		135,521		▲27.24
INC gain from JP		Swing	▲9.38	

=== Assembly Election 1985 ===
1985 Karnataka Legislative Assembly election : Gangawati
Party	Candidate	Votes	%	±%
JP	Gouli Mahadevappa	37,300	54.08	▲42.01
INC	H. S. Jayaprakash	31,145	45.16	▲10.34
Margin of victory		6,155	8.92	▼5.24
Turnout		70,933	66.60	▲14.09
Total valid votes		68,967		
Rejected ballots		1,966	2.77	▼1.59
Registered electors		106,511		▲8.86
JP gain from Independent		Swing	▲5.10	

=== Assembly Election 1983 ===
1983 Karnataka Legislative Assembly election : Gangawati
Party	Candidate	Votes	%	±%
Independent	H. S. Muralidhar	24,064	48.98	New
INC	C. Yadawrao	17,108	34.82	▲27.79
JP	H. Mahabaleswarappa	5,932	12.07	▼21.34
Independent	Hottepaksha Rangaswamy	2,028	4.13	New
Margin of victory		6,956	14.16	▼9.70
Turnout		51,374	52.51	▼15.52
Total valid votes		49,132		
Rejected ballots		2,242	4.36	▲0.02
Registered electors		97,839		▲14.04
Independent gain from INC(I)		Swing	▼8.29	

=== Assembly Election 1978 ===
1978 Karnataka Legislative Assembly election : Gangawati
Party	Candidate	Votes	%	±%
INC(I)	C. Yadave Rao Shesha Rao	31,973	57.27	New
JP	Srirangadevarayalu Vceeravenkatadevarayalu	18,652	33.41	New
INC	Gunjahalli Nagappa Hirendgappa	3,924	7.03	New
RPI(K)	K. R. Tippanna Mallappa Naik	1,005	1.80	New
Margin of victory		13,321	23.86	
Turnout		58,364	68.03	
Total valid votes		55,831		
Rejected ballots		2,533	4.34	
Registered electors		85,791		
INC(I) gain from INC				

=== Assembly By-election 1974 ===
1974 Karnataka Legislative Assembly by-election : Gangawati
Party	Candidate	Votes	%	±%
INC	H. G. Ramulu			
INC hold		Swing	▼65.85	

=== Assembly Election 1972 ===
1972 Mysore State Legislative Assembly election : Gangawati
Party	Candidate	Votes	%	±%
INC	H. R. Sriramulu	38,967	65.85	▲5.10
INC(O)	Pampanagouda Basanagouda	20,209	34.15	New
Margin of victory		18,758	31.70	▲10.19
Turnout		62,547	66.06	▲10.84
Total valid votes		59,176		
Registered electors		94,684		▲33.14
INC hold		Swing	▲5.10	

=== Assembly Election 1967 ===
1967 Mysore State Legislative Assembly election : Gangawati
Party	Candidate	Votes	%	±%
INC	T. D. Raya	22,014	60.75	▼11.67
Independent	H. R. Rao	14,221	39.25	New
Margin of victory		7,793	21.51	▼23.32
Turnout		39,272	55.22	▲13.81
Total valid votes		36,235		
Registered electors		71,117		▲21.91
INC hold		Swing	▼11.67	

=== Assembly Election 1962 ===
1962 Mysore State Legislative Assembly election : Gangawati
Party	Candidate	Votes	%	±%
INC	Tirumaladeva Rayalu Rangadevarayalu	15,823	72.42	▲12.14
Lok Sewak Sangh	Shanamukhappa Bhimappa	6,027	27.58	New
Margin of victory		9,796	44.83	▲9.12
Turnout		24,156	41.41	▼2.16
Total valid votes		21,850		
Registered electors		58,337		▲19.14
INC hold		Swing	▲12.14	

=== Assembly Election 1957 ===
1957 Mysore State Legislative Assembly election : Gangawati
Party	Candidate	Votes	%	±%
INC	Desai Bhimsain Rao	12,862	60.28	▲23.12
Independent	Achappa Ishwarappa	5,243	24.57	New
Independent	Amaregouda Ramareddy	1,986	9.31	New
Independent	Mahadevappa Narayanappa	1,245	5.84	New
Margin of victory		7,619	35.71	▲15.66
Turnout		21,336	43.57	▲1.83
Total valid votes		21,336		
Registered electors		48,964		▲3.73
INC gain from Independent		Swing	▲3.07	

=== Assembly Election 1952 ===
1952 Hyderabad State Legislative Assembly election : Gangawati
Party	Candidate	Votes	%	±%
Independent	Hiremath. K. R	11,272	57.21	New
INC	Keshav Rao Sakharam Pant	7,321	37.16	New
Socialist Party (India)	Mahantayya	1,110	5.63	New
Margin of victory		3,951	20.05	
Turnout		19,703	41.74	
Total valid votes		19,703		
Registered electors		47,204		
Independent win (new seat)				

== See also ==
- List of constituencies of the Karnataka Legislative Assembly
- Koppal district
