= National highways of India =

Network of highways owned by the Government of India

Renumbered National Highways map of India (schematic)

The national highways in India are a network of limited access roads owned by the Ministry of Road Transport and Highways. National highways have flyover access or some controlled-access, where entrance and exit is through the side of the flyover. At each highway intersection, flyovers are provided to bypass the traffic on the city, town, or village. These highways are designed for speeds of 100 km/h. Some national highways have interchanges in between, but do not have total controlled-access throughout the highways. The highways are constructed and managed by the Central Public Works Department (CPWD), the National Highways and Infrastructure Development Corporation Limited (NHIDCL), and the public works departments (PWD) of state governments. Currently, the longest national highway in India is National Highway 44 at 4,112 km (2,555 mi). India started to increase the number of lanes of major national highways to 4 or more with the National Highway Development Project (NHDP). As of March 2022, India has approximately 35,000 km of four-lane National highways.

The National Highways Authority of India (NHAI) and the National Highways and Infrastructure Development Corporation Limited (NHIDCL) are the nodal agencies responsible for building, upgrading, and maintaining most of the National Highways network. Both operate under the Ministry of Road Transport and Highways. The National Highways Development Project (NHDP) is a major effort to expand and upgrade the network of highways. NHAI often uses a public–private partnership model for highway maintenance, and toll-collection. NHIDCL uses the Engineering, Procurement, and Construction (EPC) model to build, develop and maintain strategic roads in international borders of the country.

In India, National Highways are at-grade roads, whereas expressways are controlled-access highways where entrance and exit is controlled by the use ramps that are incorporated into the design of the expressway. National Highways follows standards set by Indian Roads Congress and Bureau of Indian Standards.

NHs in India

== Characteristics ==
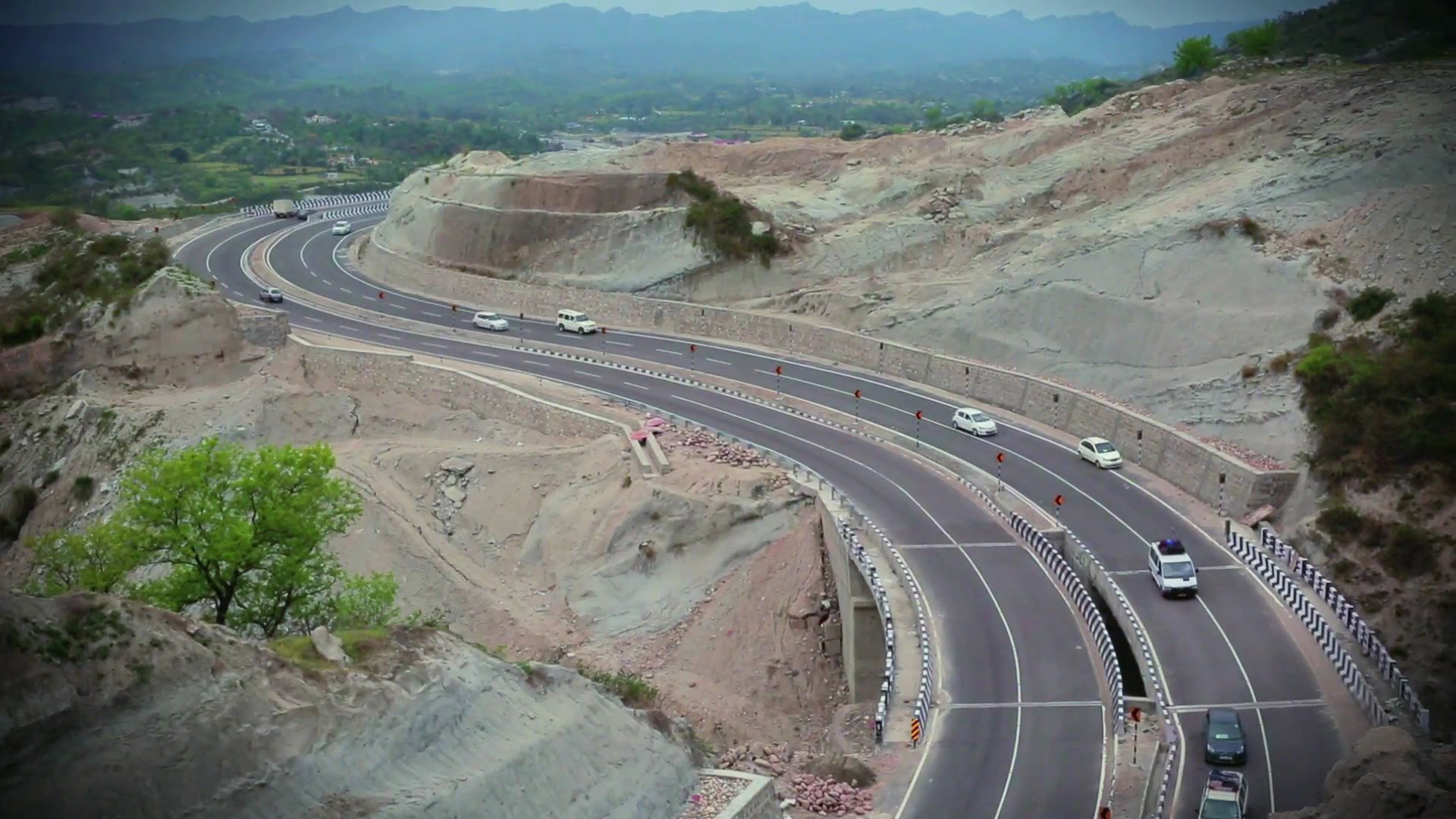
Entrance of National Highway 44, the longest National Highway in India (from Srinagar to Kanyakumari)

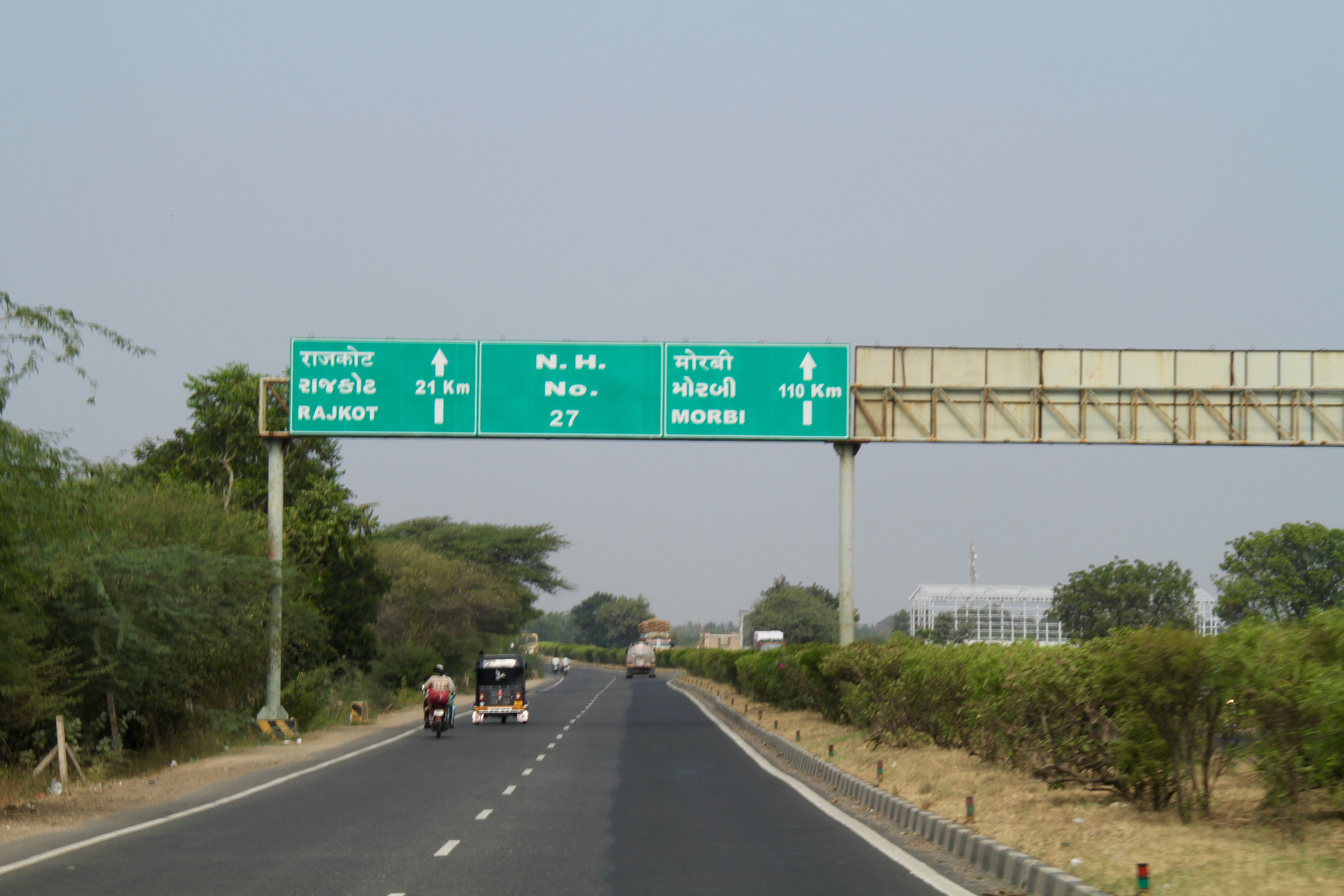
National Highway 27 in Gujarat

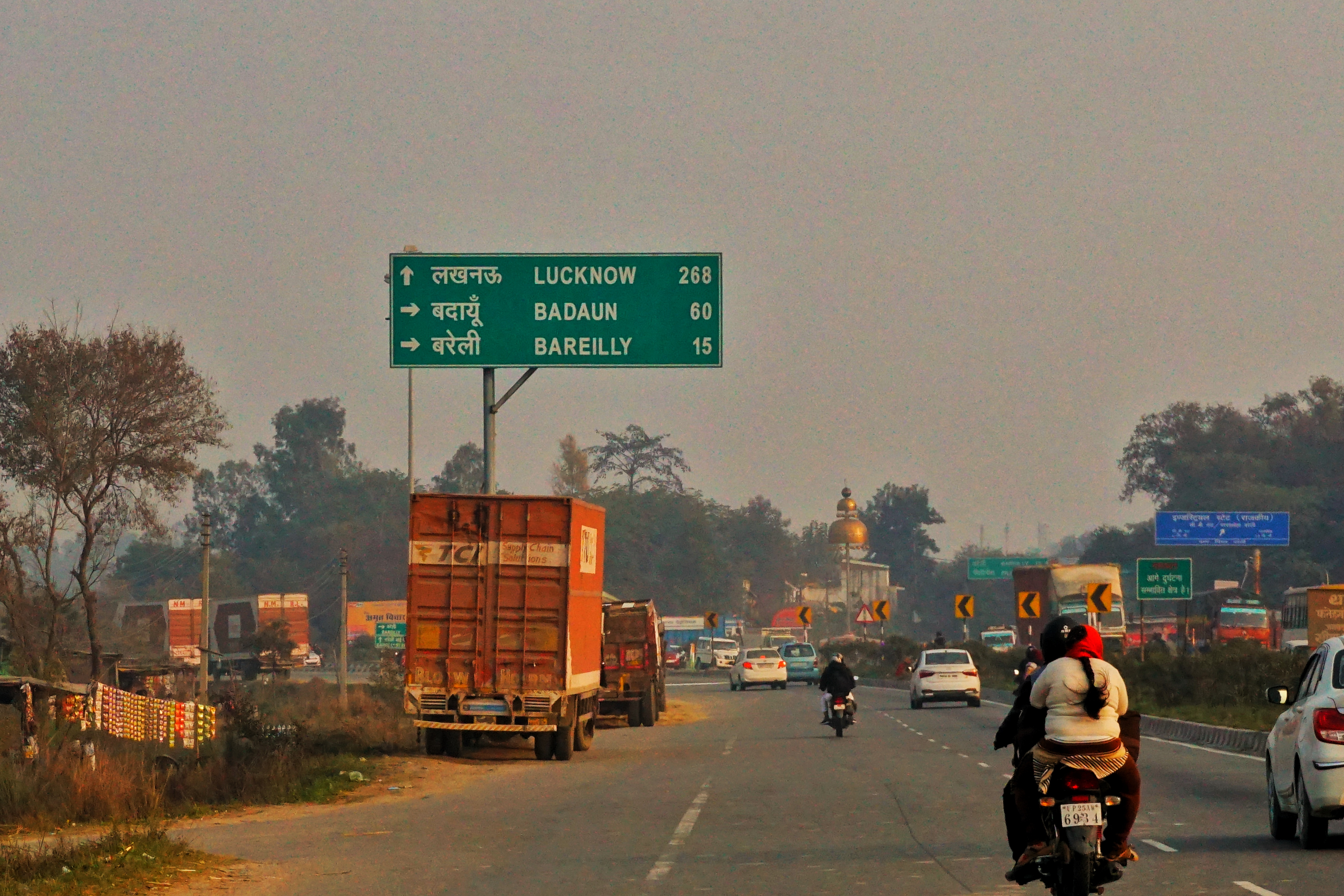
A section of National Highway 24 in Bareilly, Uttar Pradesh

India has 161,350 km (100,260 mi) of national highways as of March 2022 compared to 101,011 km in FY 2013–14. In July 2023, Union Road Transport and Highways Minister Nitin Gadkari claimed total length of the national highways in the country increased by about 59% in the span of the last nine years.

As of 2013, National highways constituted 2.7% of India's total road network, but carried about 40% of road traffic. In 2016, the government vowed to double the highway length from 101,011 to 200,000 km.

The majority of existing highways are now four-lane roads (two lanes in each direction), though much of this is being expanded to six or more lanes. Some sections of the network are toll roads. Only a few highways are built with concrete. Bypasses have been constructed around larger towns and cities to provide uninterrupted passage for highway traffic. Some existing roads have been reclassified as national highways.

== History ==
The National Highways Act, 1956 provided for public i.e. state investment in the building and maintenance of the highways.

The National Highways Authority of India was established by the National Highways Authority of India Act, 1988. Section 16(1) of the Act states that the function of NHAI is to develop, maintain, and manage the National Highways and any other highways vested in, or entrusted to, it by the Government of India.

In 1998 India launched a massive program of highway upgrades, called the National Highways Development Project (NHDP), in which the main north–south and east–west corridors and highways connecting the four metropolitan cities (Delhi, Mumbai, Chennai and Kolkata) have been fully paved and widened into four-lane highways. Some of the busier National Highway sectors in India were also converted to four- or six-lane limited-access highways.

The National Highways and Infrastructure Development Corporation Limited started functioning as of 18 July 2014. It is a fully owned company of the Government of India, under the administrative control of the Ministry of Road Transport and Highways, and was created to develop, maintain and manage the national highways, strategic roads and other infrastructure of India. It was dedicated to the task of promoting regional connectivity in parts of the country which share international boundaries. It is responsible for the development, maintenance and management of National Highways in hilly terrain of North-East part of India, Andaman & Nicobar Islands, Himachal Pradesh, Jammu & Kashmir, Ladakh and Uttarakhand. It works as a specialised agency in high altitude areas and border areas. Apart from highways, NHIDCL is constructing logictic hubs and transport related infrastructure e.g. multimodal transport hubs such as bus ports, container depots, automated multilevel car parking etc.

The Ministry of Road Transport and Highways adopted a new systematic numbering of National Highways in April 2010. It is a systematic numbering scheme based on the orientation and the geographic location of the highway. The new system indicates the direction of National Highways whether they are east–west (odd numbers) or north–south (even numbers). It also indicates the geographical region where they are with even numbers increasing from east to west starting from NH2 and odd numbers increasing from north to south starting from NH1.

Bharatmala, a centrally-sponsored and funded road and highways project of the Government of India with a target of constructing 83,677 km (51,994 mi) of new highways, was started in 2018. Phase I of the Bharatmala project involves the construction of 34,800 km of highways (including the remaining projects under NHDP) at an estimated cost of ₹5.35 lakh crore (US$57 billion) by 2021–22.

== Expanding National Highway Network ==
The average speed of NH construction has also seen a significant increase, from a baseline of 12.1 km/day in 2014 rising to 28.3 km/day (143%).

The speed of highway construction reached 37 km per day in 2020-21, a record for fastest highway construction in India.

National Highway of India in 2014, 91287km.
1. < 2 Lane, 27517km (30.0%)
2. 2 Lane / 2 Lane + PS, 45399 Km (50.0%)
3. 4 Lane, 18371 km (20.0%)
National Highway of India in 2023, 146145km.
1. < 2 Lane, 14870km (10.0%)
2. 2 Lane / 2 Lane + PS, 85096 km (58.0%)
3. 4 Lane, 46179km (32.0%)

== Network length ==
Total length of national highways in India in km
Year	Total length in km
2023-2024	151,874
2022-2023	145,240
2021 - 2022	140,995
2020 - 2021	136,440
2019 - 2020	132,995
2018 - 2019	132,500
2017 - 2018	126,500
2016 - 2017	114,158
2015 - 2016	101,011
2014 - 2015	97,991
2013 - 2014	91,287
2012 - 2013	79,116
2011 - 2012	76,818
2010 - 2011	70,934
2009 - 2010	70,934
2008 - 2009	70,548
2007 - 2008	66,754
2006 - 2007	66,590
2005 - 2006	66,590
2004 - 2005	65,569
2003 - 2004	65,569
2002 - 2003	58,112
2001 - 2002	58,112
1991 - 2001	57,737
{{{label25}}}	33,650
1981 - 1991	31,671
1971 - 1981	23,838
1961 - 1971	23,798

National Highways in India, by state and union territories and maintaining agency
State / union territory	State PWD	NHAI	NHIDCL	Total length as on 31.03.2019 (km)
Andaman and Nicobar Islands			87	331
Andhra Pradesh				6,912
Arunachal Pradesh			1,035	2,537
Assam			1,010	3,909
Bihar				5,358
Chandigarh				15
Chhattisgarh				3,605
Dadra and Nagar Haveli				31
Daman and Diu				22
Delhi				157
Goa				293
Gujarat				6,635
Haryana				3,166
Himachal Pradesh			320	2,607
Jammu & Kashmir			436	2,423
Jharkhand				3,367
Karnataka				7,335
Kerala				1,782
Lakshadweep				0
Madhya Pradesh				8,772
Maharashtra				17,757
Manipur			1,751	1,750
Meghalaya			823	1,156
Mizoram			372	1,422.5
Nagaland			324	1,548
Odisha				5,762
Puducherry				27
Punjab				3,274
Rajasthan				10,342
Sikkim			595	463
Tamil Nadu				6,742
Telangana				3,795
Tripura			573	854
Uttarakhand			660	2,949
Uttar Pradesh				11,737
West Bengal			4	3,664
India total		48,590	7,990	132,500

== Year wise national highways in India, by state and union territory ==
As at end-March and length in kms.

Source: Ministry of Road Transport and Highways, Government of India.

State/union territory	2005	2006	2007	2008	2009	2010	2011	2012	2013	2014
Andaman and Nicobar Islands	300	300	300	300	300	300	300	300	300	300
Andhra Pradesh	4472	4472	4472	4472	4537	4537	4537	4537	5022	6590
Arunachal Pradesh	392	392	392	392	1992	1992	1992	2027	2027	2027
Assam	2836	2836	2836	2836	2836	2836	2836	2940	2940	3634
Bihar	3537	3642	3642	3642	3642	3642	3642	4106	4168	4467
Chandigarh	24	24	24	24	24	24	24	24	24	24
Chhattisgarh	2184	2184	2184	2184	2184	2184	2184	2289	2289	3031
Delhi	72	72	72	72	72	80	80	80	80	80
Goa	269	269	269	269	269	269	269	269	269	269
Gujarat	2871	3245	3245	3245	3245	3245	3245	4032	3828	4694
Haryana	1468	1512	1512	1512	1512	1518	1518	1633	1633	2050
Himachal Pradesh	1208	1208	1208	1208	1409	1409	1409	1506	1506	2196
Jammu and Kashmir	823	1245	1245	1245	1245	1245	1245	1245	1695	2319
Jharkhand	1805	1805	1805	1805	1805	1805	1805	2170	2374	2968
Karnataka	3843	3843	3843	3843	4396	4396	4396	4396	4642	6177
Kerala	1440	1440	1440	1457	1457	1457	1457	1457	1457	1700
Madhya Pradesh	5200	4670	4670	4670	4670	5027	5027	5064	5116	5116
Maharashtra	4176	4176	4176	4176	4176	4191	4191	4257	4498	6249
Manipur	959	959	959	959	959	959	959	1317	1317	1452
Meghalaya	810	810	810	810	810	810	810	1171	1171	1171
Mizoram	927	927	927	927	927	927	927	1027	1027	122
Nagaland	494	494	494	494	494	494	494	494	494	741
Odisha	3704	3704	3704	3704	3704	3704	3704	3704	4416	4550
Puducherry	53	53	53	53	53	53	53	53	53	53
Punjab	1557	1557	1557	1557	1557	1557	1557	1557	1557	1699
Rajasthan	5585	5585	5585	5585	5585	5585	5585	7130	7180	7646
Sikkim	62	62	62	62	62	62	62	149	149	149
Tamil Nadu	4183	4462	4462	4462	4832	4832	4832	4943	4943	4975
Telangana	.	.	.	.	.	.	.	.	.	.
Tripura	400	400	400	400	400	400	400	400	400	509
Uttar Pradesh	5599	5874	5874	5874	6774	6774	6774	7818	7818	7986
Uttarakhand	1991	1991	1991	1991	2042	2042	2042	2042	2042	2282
West Bengal	2325	2377	2377	2524	2578	2578	2578	2681	2681	2908
All India	65569	66590	66590	66754	70548	70934	70934	76818	79116	91287

State-wise length of National Highways

Note: Yearly data for 2018 and 2020 are not available.

State/union territory	2015	2016	2017	2019	2021	2022	2023	2024
Andaman and Nicobar Islands	331	331	331	331	331			
Andhra Pradesh	4670	5465	6383	6912	7340			
Arunachal Pradesh	2513	2513	2537	2537	2537			
Assam	3784	3821	3845	3909	3936			
Bihar	4701	4839	4839	5358	5421			
Chandigarh	15	15	15	15	15			
Chhattisgarh	3079	3078	3523	3605	3620			
Delhi	80	80	79	157	157			
Goa	262	262	293	293	299			
Gujarat	4971	4971	5456	6635	7744			
Haryana	2307	2622	2741	3166	3237			
Himachal Pradesh	2466	2642	2643	2607	2607			
Jammu and Kashmir	2593	2601	2601	2423	2423			
Jharkhand	2632	2654	2661	3367	3367			
Karnataka	6432	6503	6991	7335	7412			
Kerala	1811	1812	1782	1782	1782			
Madhya Pradesh	5184	5194	8053	8772	8941			
Maharashtra	7048	7435	16239	17757	17931			
Manipur	1746	1746	1746	1750	1750			
Meghalaya	1204	1203	1204	1156	1156			
Mizoram	1381	1381	1423	1423	1423			
Nagaland	1080	1150	1547	1548	1548			
Odisha	4645	4838	5413	5762	5897			
Puducherry	64	64	64	27	64			
Punjab	2239	2769	3228	3274	4099			
Rajasthan	7886	7906	8972	10342	10350			
Sikkim	309	463	463	463	709			
Tamil Nadu	5006	4946	5918	6742	6858			
Telangana	2687	2696	3786	3795	3974			
Tripura	577	805	854	854	854			
Uttar Pradesh	8483	8483	9017	11737	11831			
Uttarakhand	2842	2714	2842	2949	3106			
West Bengal	2910	2956	3004	3664	3665			
All India	97991	101011	120493	132500	136440			

== Funding ==
National Highways Authority of India has enough funds to increase the pace of road building. At the listing ceremony of the National Highways Infra Trust's (NHAI InVITs) non-convertible debentures, the National Highway Infra Trust issued and listed Non-Convertible Debentures (NCDs) worth Rs 1,500 crore on the Bombay Stock Exchange, with a long-dated maturity of 25 years.

NHAI collected tolls worth Rs 34,742 crore on national highways in FY22. Additionally NHAI toll revenue is expected to rise to Rs. 1.40 lakh crores by 2028.

== Future ==
Brownfield National Highway Projects is an upgrading/widening of existing four lane highways into six lane highways which are not controlled access highways.

== Trivia ==
- The longest national highway is NH44, which runs between Srinagar in Jammu and Kashmir and Kanyakumari in Tamil Nadu, covering a distance of 4,112 km (2,555 mi).
- The shortest national highway is NH766EE, which spans 4.27 km (2.65 mi), from Hettikeri to Belekeri port in Karnataka.
- The Leh–Manali Highway connecting Leh in Ladakh to Manali in Himachal Pradesh is the second highest-altitude motorable highway in the world.

== See also ==
- List of national highways in India
- List of national highways in India by state
- List of national highways in India by union territory
- India–Myanmar–Thailand Trilateral Highway
- Roads in India
