= Andhra Pradesh Industrial Infrastructure Corporation =

Andhra Pradesh Government initiative

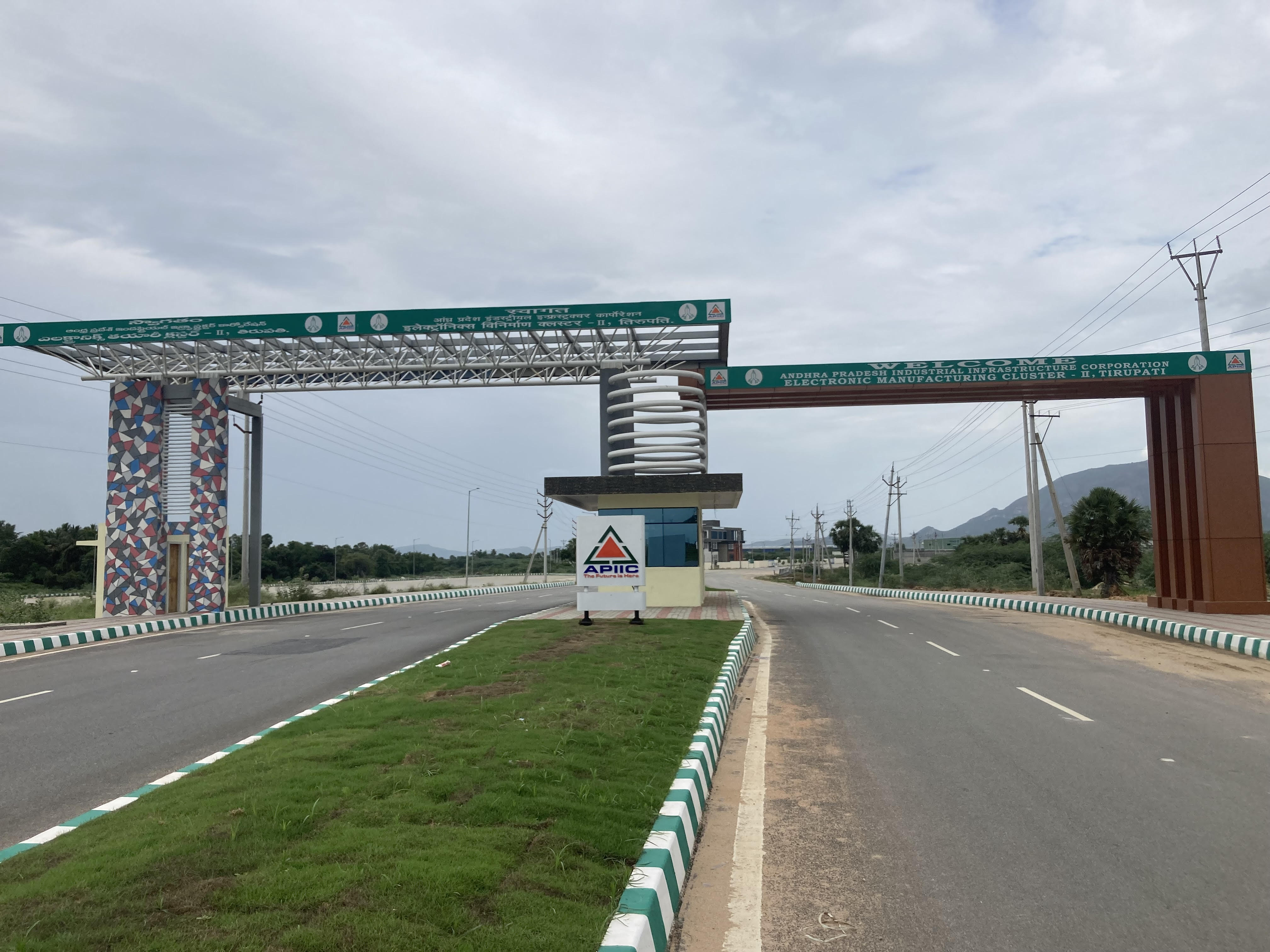
APIIC EMC 2 Entrance Tirupati

The Andhra Pradesh Industrial Infrastructure Corporation Limited (APIIC) is an Andhra Pradesh Government initiative for providing infrastructure through development of industrial areas.

APIIC was established in the year 1973 for identifying and developing potential growth centres in the State fully equipped with developed plots/sheds, roads, drainage, water, power and other infrastructural facilities; providing social infrastructure, like housing for workers near industrial zones; co-ordinating with the agencies concerned for providing communication, transport and other facilities. The corporation also has active projects in the Public-Private Partnership Mode

== Projects undertaken ==
APIIC has been the principal facilitator in mega-projects such as HITEC City, now in Telangana; Special Economic Zones such as Sricity, a developing Satellite City in the epicentre of Andhra Pradesh and Tamil Nadu. Visakha Industrial Water Supply, Gangavaram Port, Convention Centre and Mega Industrial Parks at Parawada.

== Plans for APIIC Tower ==
The Government has earmarked a 97-acre (390,000 m^{2}) site to the Andhra Pradesh Industrial Infrastructure Corporation (APIIC) for the proposed trade tower to be constructed at Manchirevula near Narsingi, in the business district. According to APIIC Chairman S.Siva Rama Subramanyam, who recently led a three-member corporation team to Kuala Lumpur, Malaysia, to study the famed 'Petronas Towers' there, the modalities of the project were being worked out. After the initial expression of interest, global tenders were expected to be called in within a couple of months.

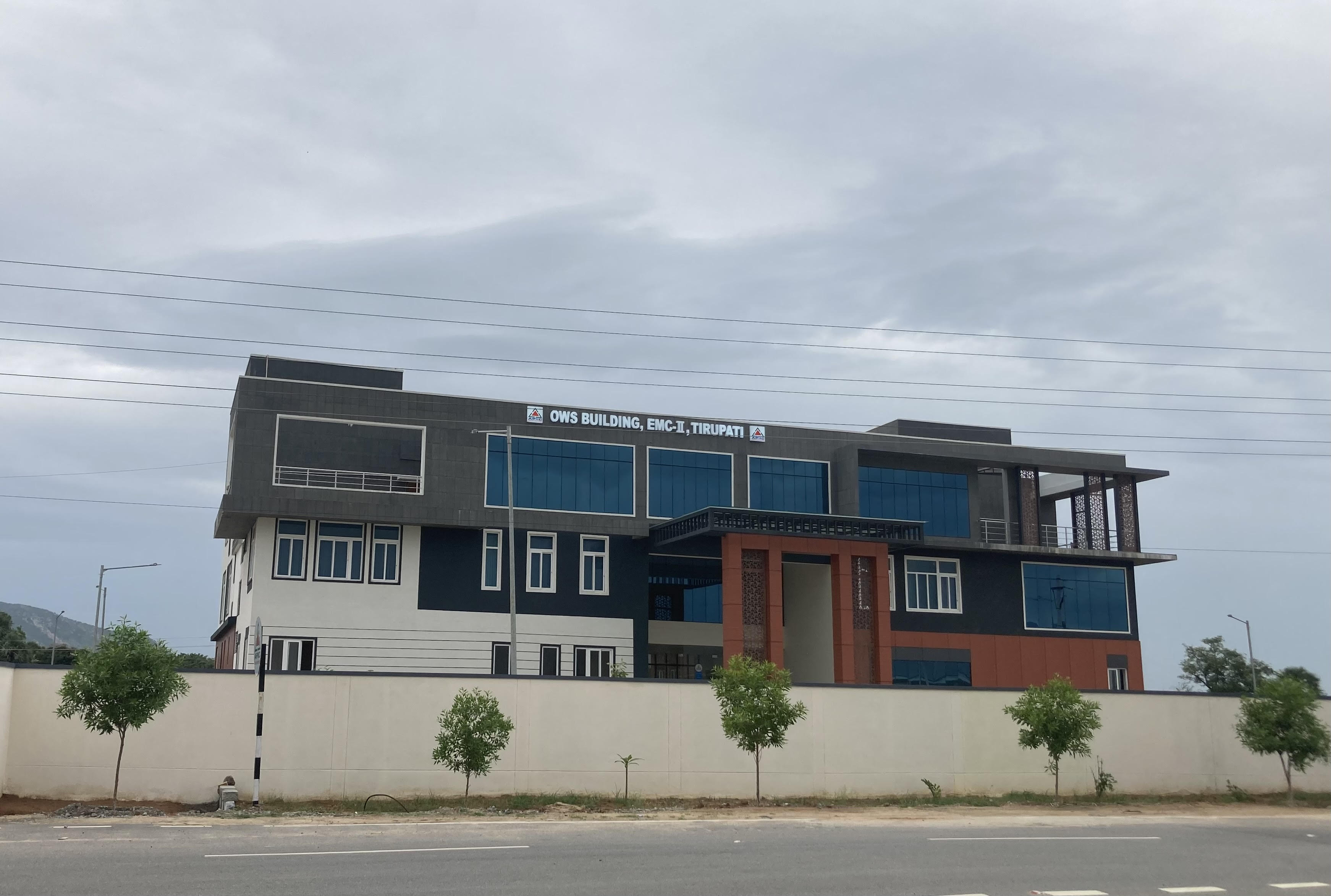

The APIIC tower could either be a joint venture or with the APIIC as an equity partner, the modalities of which were yet to be worked out with consultants. He said a consultant, Fortune Capitals had been mandated to work out the plan. The APIIC was keen to start the work at the earliest in the next fiscal.

This plan was eventually scrapped after the bifurcation of Andhra Pradesh and that planned land is now under the administration of Telangana State Industrial Infrastructure Corporation (TSIIC).

== EMAAR-MGF Boulder Hills ==
APIIC has been embroiled in a controversy over land acquisition for the Boulder Hills project in Hyderabad, a joint venture with EMAAR-MGF (also see EMAAR). News reports suggest that the APIIC agreed to dilute the public stake by undervaluing the land that it contributed. About 500 acres (2.0 km^{2}) of land was acquired by APIIC in 2002-2003 for setting up a golf course and residential properties. Of the 535 acres (2.17 km^{2}) of land in Manikonda near the Indian School of Business, APIIC sold 285 acres (1.15 km^{2}) at 2.7 million per acre as against the prevailing price of 10 million per acre in 2003. The remaining 235 acres (and an additional 15 acres (61,000 m^{2}) of unusable land) were allotted as a 66-year lease with a 2% share of the Golf course revenues. EMAAR sold this project to EMAAR-MGF and diluted the value of APIIC's stake from 26% to 4%, by not considering the prevailing market rate for the land in 2009.

Multiple claimants to the land have emerged, including the WAKF board and the previous farmer owners of this land. The customers who have paid for properties in the developed project are in jeopardy due to the unclear land title. On the back of the controversial Boulder Hills deal with EMAAR-MGF, several other APIIC projects, including the Raheja Mindspace IT park, that were approved in the period between 2003 and 2009 are being questioned. There are allegations of irregularities in land deals during the Chief Ministership of Y.S. Rajasekhara Reddy.

There are also allegations that government officials were allocated parcels of the property at deeply discounted prices compared to the prevailing market price. Officials who previously ran APIIC and seem to have conflicts of interest with the developers, have refuted many of these allegations and defended earlier land allotment decisions.

There have been several calls for a thorough investigation into APIIC deals either by the CBI or by the state investigative agency CID. Though there were initial reports of an external audit, the calls for a CBI enquiry were downplayed by the Andhra Pradesh Government, which has initiated an internal APIIC probe.

== Raheja Mindspace project ==
Raheja Mindspace is one of the IT parks established in Hyderabad's HITEC city developed with about 110 Acres of land allotted by APIIC. Similar to Boulder hills, there are allegations of dilution of the Andhra Pradesh state's ownership (through APIIC) in the Mindspace project with active connivance of previous administrators of APIIC. APIIC former managing director B. P. Acharya, principal secretary (information technology and communication) K Ratna Prabha, and Special Secretary (Information Technology) Gopi Krishna in the state Government, have been implicated by the Anti Corruption Bureau in taking decisions in favor of the developers and against the interests of the public. Acharya has refuted these allegations of impropriety. Recent negotiations between the Raheja group and APIIC (and Andhra Pradesh) seek to restore the state's share in the ownership and rental revenues from the project.

== Recent Developments ==
Under the INC government of Nallari Kiran Kumar Reddy (2010-2014) proposals were by the Andhra Pradesh government to divest from costly APIIC infrastructure projects, which caused large public disagreement between the two entities.

The YSRCP Chief Minister Y. S. Jaganmohan Reddy appointed the actress-turned politician R. K. Roja as Chairman of the APIIC in 2019. Her appointment coincided with the unveiling of the government's New Industrial Policy. This program promises concessions for women minority entrepreneurs, an investment in MSMEs (Micro, Small and Medium Enterprises), a particular focus on pharma, textiles, automobiles, electronics and petrochemicals, and finally additional subsidies for mega-projects in line with investment proposals.
