= Bharat International Rice Conference =

International rice industry conference held in India

- Date: 2025
- Venue: New Delhi, India
- Also known as: BIRC
- Type: Trade conference
- Organised by: Indian Rice Exporters Federation
- Website: birc.in

The Bharat International Rice Conference (BIRC) is an international trade and industry conference focused on the global rice sector.

The event is organized by the Indian Rice Exporters Federation (IREF) in collaboration with the Agricultural and Processed Food Products Export Development Authority (APEDA), Ministry of Commerce & Industry, Government of India.

== Background ==
The Bharat International Rice Conference was first started in 2025, in New Delhi. As per the reports BIRC as one of the largest rice events of the world.

BIRC is the platform for India’s rice export industry which provides opportunities for exporters to interact directly with international policymakers and buyers. The conference is the evident of a forum for addressing challenges arising from geopolitical and market disruptions and aligning industry practices with global standards.

=== 2025 conference ===
The 2025 Bharat International Rice Conference was held on 30–31 October 2025 at Bharat Mandapam, New Delhi.

The event was organized by The Indian Rice Exporters Federation in collaboration with the Agricultural and Processed Food Products Export Development Authority (APEDA), Ministry of Commerce and Industry, Govt. of India. The conference was the evident of 154 exhibitors and 1083 international buyers from all across the country. As part of India's trade partnerships, worth Rs 30,435 crore MoUs were signed on this day.

It was described in media reports as one of the rice-focused industry gatherings globally. Policymakers, exporters, and representatives of international organizations including the International Rice Research Institute (IRRI) participated in the conference. The focus of discussion was improving quality standards, expanding market access, and strengthening India’s rice export ecosystem.
