= B. P. Acharya =

Indian bureaucrat (born 1960)

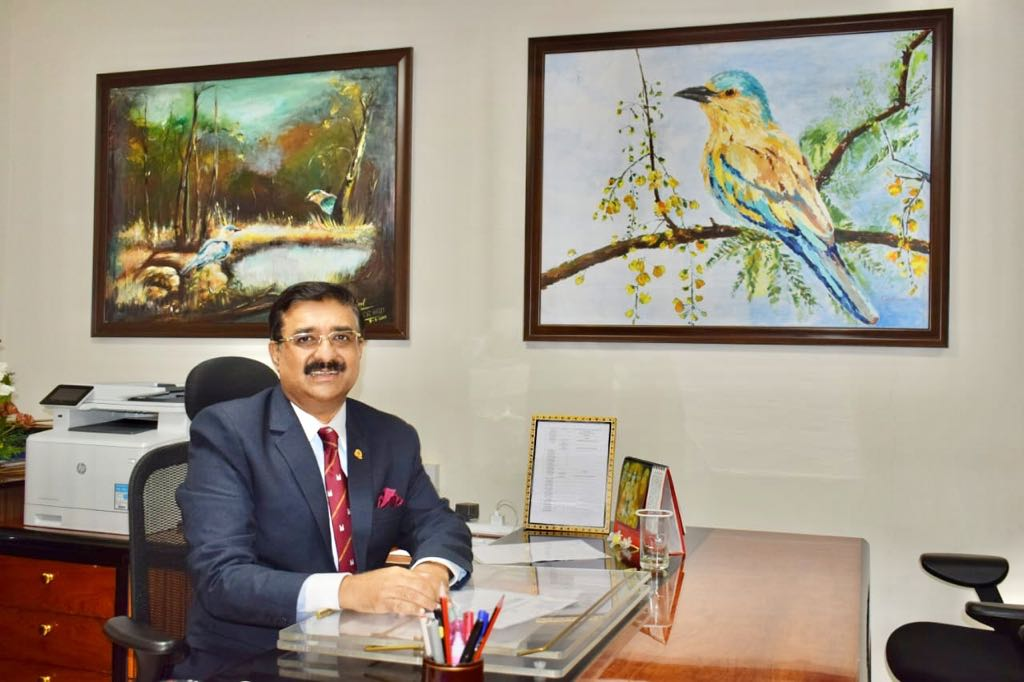
- Acharya in his office at MCR HRD Institute
- Born: 30 October 1960 (age 65)
- Occupation: Indian Administrative Service Officer

B. P. Acharya (born 30 October 1960) is a senior officer of the 1983 batch Indian Administrative Service (IAS).

== Career ==
Acharya's first government position, in 1985, was as a sub-collector in Bhadrachalam. In 1993 he became Warangal collector. He was Special Chief Secretary, Planning in Telangana until December 2017. On his retirement in 2020, he was Director General for MCR HRD Institute of Telangana and also Special Chief Secretary in General Administration Department for Telangana State.

As Secretary, Industries and Commerce, he was involved in creating Genome Valley on the outskirts of Hyderabad and many such industrial clusters. After retirement, he was appointed as advisor to the Indian Council of Medical Research for their National Animal Resource Facility for Biomedical Research in Genome Valley.

=== Corruption investigation ===
In January 2012, Acharya was arrested by the Central Bureau of Investigation (CBI) on charges of conspiracy, cheating, and corruption in connection with a joint development venture with Emaar Properties at Gachibowli during his tenure as vice chairman and managing director of the publicly owned Andhra Pradesh Industrial Infrastructure Corporation in 2005–10. He was released on bail in March 2012 and surrendered after his bail was revoked later the same month. The accused secured a stay in early 2016. The High Court subsequently quashed the charge against Acharya, and neither he nor another senior IAS officer accused by the CBI were among the 15 people charged in June 2019.

== Personal life ==
Acharya's wife, Ranjeev R. Acharya, is also a senior IAS officer.

== Publications and exhibitions ==
- Kakatiya Heritage, ed. M Pandu Ranga Rao (contribution)
- Obtuse Angle at Goethe Zentrum, Hyderabad (exhibition)
