= V. D. Rajagopal =

V. D. Rajagopal, an Indian Administrative Service officer, was accused of corruption related to illegal mining in India. He was the former Andhra Pradesh Director of Mines, Vice-Chairman and Managing Director of AP Mineral Development Corporation. The CBI arrested V. D. Rajagopal and Y. Srilakshmi, as third and fourth accused respectively in the investigation into illegal mining by Obulapuram Mining Company. V. D. Rajagopal, is accused of preferential treatment to Obulapuram and denying mining licenses to other applicants.
