= Paranna Munavalli =

Indian politician

Member of Legislative Assembly, Karnataka
- In office 2018–2023
- Preceded by: Iqbal Ansari
- Succeeded by: G. Janardhana Reddy
- Constituency: Gangawati
- In office 2008–2013
- Preceded by: Iqbal Ansari
- Succeeded by: Iqbal Ansari
- Constituency: Gangawati

Personal details
- Born: 5 May 1954 (age 71) Gadag, Karnataka
- Party: Bharatiya Janata Party
- Spouse: Shobha
- Children: One son and four daughters
- Education: Bachelor of Science
- Occupation: Businessman, Social Service

Paranna Munavalli (born 1954) is an Indian politician and a member of Karnataka Legislative Assembly from Gangawati constituency.

== Political life ==
He defeated incumbent MLA Iqbal Ansari in the 2008 Karnataka Legislative Assembly elections, but was defeated by the same person during the 2013 Karnataka Legislative Assembly elections. He was elected in 2018 Karnataka Legislative Assembly elections against Iqbal Ansari.
