= Kalyana Rajya Pragathi Paksha =

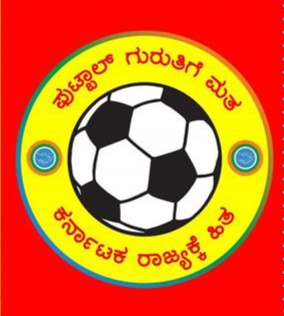
- Abbreviation: KRPP
- Leader: G. Janardhana Reddy
- President: J. Ramanna (National); G. Janardhana Reddy (State)
- Founder: G. Janardhana Reddy
- Founded: 25 December 2022 (3 years ago)
- Dissolved: 25 March 2024 (2 years ago)
- Merged into: Bharatiya Janata Party
- Headquarters: 49/48, Kyalasanahalli, Kothanur Post, Bengaluru, Karnataka 560077
- Ideology: Progressivism
- Colours: Blue
- ECI Status: Registered

Election symbol
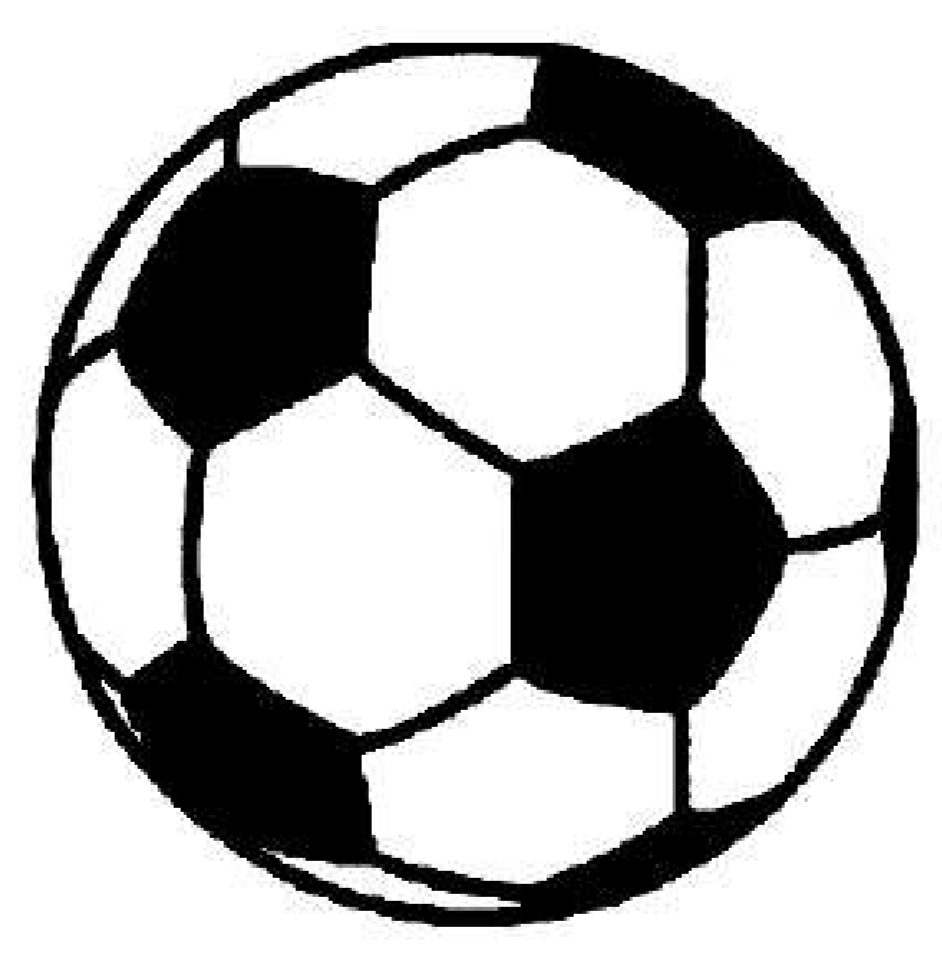

Kalyana Rajya Pragathi Paksha was an Indian political party founded on 25 December 2022 by G. Janardhan Reddy and dissolved on 25 March 2024. It was mainly based in the State of Karnataka. The party won one seat in the 2023 Karnataka Legislative Assembly election.It had influence mainly in Ballari, Koppal, Vijayanagara. Its election symbol was Football. The Party founder president won from the Gangawati Assembly constituency.

G. Janardhana Reddy merged his KRPP with the BJP on 25 March 2024 ahead of the 2024 Lok Sabha polls.

== Ideology ==
G. Janardhana Reddy has stated that KRPP will follow philosophies of Basava. The election commission has allotted Football as their party symbol, and Mr.Janardhan Reddy has been contesting the polls from Gangavathi constituency at Kalyana Karnataka region of the state.

Janardhana Reddy has already announced the names of candidates for five assembly constituencies as a first step. Kalyan Rajya Pragati Party candidates have been announced for Siraguppa, Kanakagiri, Nagathan, Sindanur and Hiriyur assembly constituencies.

== List of National Presidents ==
No.	Portrait	Name (Birth–Death)	Term in office		
No.	Portrait	Name (Birth–Death)	Assumed office	Left office	Time in office
1		J. Ramanna (not available)	25 December 2022	25 March 2024	1 year, 91 days

== List of Karnataka State Presidents ==
No.	Portrait	Name (Birth–Death)	Term in office		
No.	Portrait	Name (Birth–Death)	Assumed office	Left office	Time in office
1	Gali Janardhana Reddy	Gali Janardhana Reddy (1967–)	25 December 2022	25 March 2024	1 year, 91 days
