= Nitte =

Village in Karnataka, India

- Village
- Location within Karnataka Location within India
- Coordinates: 13°11′09″N 74°56′22″E
- Country: India
- State: Karnataka
- District: Udupi
- Taluk: Karkala

Government
  - Type: Gram Panchayat

Area
  - Total: 39.32 km^{2} (15.18 sq mi)
- Elevation: 58 m (190 ft)

Population (2011)
  - Total: 12,354
  - Density: 314.2/km^{2} (813.8/sq mi)

Languages
  - Official: Kannada
  - Regional: Tulu, Konkani, Beary
- Time zone: UTC+5:30 (IST)
- PIN: 574110
- STD code: 08258
- Vehicle registration: KA-20

Nitte is a village in Karkala Taluk, Udupi District, Karnataka, India. It is located on the way from Padubidri to Karkala, about 26 kilometres southeast of the district capital Udupi, and 7 kilometres southwest of the taluk capital Karkala. In the year 2011, the village is home to 12,354 inhabitants.

== Geography ==
Nitte is located on the foothills of the Western Ghat Mountains. It is connected to the Karnataka State Highwayt SH-1. Its average elevation is 58 metres above the sea level.

== Climate ==
Nitte has a Tropical Monsoon Climate (Am) according to the Köppen Climate Classification. It receives the most rainfall in July, with an average precipitation of 957 mm; and the least rainfall in January and February, with an average precipitation of 6 mm.

Climate data for Nitte
Month	Jan	Feb	Mar	Apr	May	Jun	Jul	Aug	Sep	Oct	Nov	Dec	Year
Mean daily maximum °C (°F)	32.3 (90.1)	33.1 (91.6)	33.3 (91.9)	32.9 (91.2)	31.3 (88.3)	27.7 (81.9)	26.8 (80.2)	27 (81)	28.1 (82.6)	29.4 (84.9)	30.8 (87.4)	31.7 (89.1)	30.4 (86.7)
Daily mean °C (°F)	26.1 (79.0)	27 (81)	28.1 (82.6)	28.7 (83.7)	27.9 (82.2)	25.5 (77.9)	24.8 (76.6)	24.8 (76.6)	25.3 (77.5)	26 (79)	26.3 (79.3)	26 (79)	26.4 (79.5)
Mean daily minimum °C (°F)	21.2 (70.2)	22.2 (72.0)	24 (75)	25.6 (78.1)	25.4 (77.7)	24.1 (75.4)	23.6 (74.5)	23.3 (73.9)	23.3 (73.9)	23.4 (74.1)	22.6 (72.7)	21.5 (70.7)	23.4 (74.0)
Average rainfall mm (inches)	6 (0.2)	6 (0.2)	41 (1.6)	106 (4.2)	224 (8.8)	797 (31.4)	957 (37.7)	676 (26.6)	351 (13.8)	325 (12.8)	115 (4.5)	23 (0.9)	3,627 (142.7)
Source: Climate-Data.org

== Demographics ==
According to the 2011 Indian Census, Nitte has a total of 2,577 households. Among the 12,354 residents, 6,002 are male and 6,352 are female. The overall literacy rate is 82.71%, with 5,141 of the male population and 5,077 of the female population being literate. The census location code of the village is 608896.

The dominant language of Nitte is Kannada, with certain neighborhoods speaking Tulu, Konkani and Beary. Various communities include the Shivalli Brahmins, Bunts, GSB, Billavas, Mogaveeras, Christians and Muslims.

== Education ==
=== Primary and High Schools ===
- Dr. NSAM high school
- GHPS Borgalgudde
- GHPS Kallambadipadavu
- U B M C Ahps, Kallambadi
- GHPS Kemmannu Nitte

=== Colleges ===
- Justice K.S Hegde Institute of Management
- NMAM Institute of Technology
- NSAM PU College
- Dr.NSAM First Grade College
- NRAM Polytechnic
- Nitte University

== Religious sites ==
- Sri Durgaparameshwari temple, Kemmannu
- Sri Ganapathi temple, near Nitte College
- Badriya Jummah Mosque, Nitte-Mangalore Road
- St. Lawrence Church Attur

== Notable people ==
- N. Santosh Hegde
