= Obulapuram Mining Company =

Indian mining company (2001)

- Industry: Mine; Materials
- Founded: 29 October 2001; 24 years ago at Karnataka, India
- Headquarters: 123 Veeranagouda Colony Opp Kumara Swamy Temple Bellary, India, 583104
- Key people: G. Karunakara Reddy, G. Janardhana Reddy and G. Somashekara Reddy
- Products: Mine; Iron ores Manganiferous ore

Obulapuram Mining Company also known as OMC or OMCPL is an iron ore mining company located in Karnataka and Andhra Pradesh in India. The company is owned by the brothers, G. Karunakara Reddy, G. Janardhana Reddy and G. Somashekara Reddy, who were ministers in the Government of Karnataka. The company has been fighting charges of illegal mining in forest lands on the Karnataka-Andhra Pradesh border. OMCPL holds iron ore mining leases in 134 hectares in Anantapur District of Andhra Pradesh and iron ore reserves in these leases are estimated to be around 100 million tonnes. OMCPL is also the promoter of a Bramhani Industries Limited, an iron and steel producer. JSW steel is said to be in talks for partial ownership of OMC.

== Investigation by Income Tax Department ==
The Income Tax Department, Karnataka and Goa Investigation and Central Commissionerate had unearthed under-invoicing and tax evasion of around by the Obulapuram Mining Company (OMC), run by Karnataka's Reddy brothers and also their trusted confidante and state health minister B Sriramulu which sparked off the entire investigation into discrepancies into mining in the State of Karnataka.

The investigation found massive tax evasion and money laundering prompted mass panic amongst the then BJP government in Karnataka. A team of officers found that the OMC had entered into a MoU with a one-dollar company of Singapore to camouflage the company's income suppression. Officials found that the one-dollar company, GLA Trading International (GLATI), was established on 30 November 2007, with Janardhana Reddy as one of its directors. GLA, presumed to be named after Janardhana Reddy's wife Gali Laxmi Aruna, has offices in Singapore, Dubai and the British Virgin Islands, which is a `tax haven'. The investigation report held that "OMC's transactions through the MoU with GLATI are convoluted and devised to evade tax payment in India," A comparative study of shipping bills for export with other companies, which are exporting the same grade material, confirmed the malpractice by OMC. According to the report, OMC signed the MoU with GLATI to sell iron ore only to evade tax payment in India.

When the Commissioner summoned Janardhana Reddy and sought explanation from OMC, the Reddys claimed it suppressed sales for developing stronger relationship worldwide with global buyers through GLATI for financial stability against price fluctuations. This report was recorded in the book Let us Share by the Finance Ministry.

== Implication in Lokayukta Report of July 2011 ==
The Lokayukta Report on illegal mining in Karnataka details the methods in which miners, government officials and ministers colluded to defraud the government of mining revenues. The report details the complete breakdown of democratic governance in the bellary area and uncovers the "zero risk system", a protection and extortion racket, masterminded by G. Janardhana Reddy. The report describes the illegal money transfers to foreign companies and tax shelters by mining entities such as Obulapuram Mining Company, Associated Mining Company, GLA Trading and GJR Holdings owned by the Reddy Brothers.

== Investigation by CBI ==
Janardhana Reddy along with his brother-in-law, B. V. Srinivas Reddy was arrested on 5 September 2011 by the CBI, taken to Hyderabad, the Capital of the neighboring Andhra Pradesh and remanded to judicial custody in Chanchalguda Jail. He is accused of being involved in the illegal mining and export of iron ore in Bellary and Anantapur. This investigation is the culmination of a recommendation to CBI by the former Andhra Pradesh chief minister Rosaiah and not directly related to the findings of Lok Ayukta Santosh Hegde on illegal mining in Karnataka. The CBI submitted a charge-sheet in the ongoing investigation. The CBI also arrested senior officers of the IAS, V. D. Rajagopal and Y. Srilakshmi, as third and fourth accused respectively. V. D. Rajagopal, the former Andhra Pradesh Director of Mines, Vice-Chairman and Managing Director of AP Mineral Development Corporation is accused of preferential treatment to Obulapuram and denying mining licenses to other applicants. The permission for mining in Anantapur was for captive mining, i.e. the ore mined in that region is to be used in the local steel plant and not to be exported. Y. Srilakshmi former Andhra Pradesh Secretary Industries, is accused of dropping the term "captive mining" in the final order approving a mining license to Obulapuram. Srilakshmi claimed that this was done at the insistence of the former Minister of Mines and current Andhra Pradesh Home minister Sabitha Indra Reddy. However the CBI defended the Home minister, who is a senior local politician of the ruling Congress party.

However, it is political rivalry, favouritism led to misuse of CBI and government authorities against any particular community. In this case, it is then congress chief minister Rosaiah because of reddy brother's good standing with former's political rivalry Jagan mohan Reddy, now the chief minister of Andhra Pradhesh. It was evidenced that Reddys had good standing with India's leading steel manufacturers, for decades, nullifying all the false claims. It should be recalled that Rosaiah rose to power under the dictatorship of then central congress leadership, who was handpicked by Sonia, after death of then chief minister Mr Raja Sekhar reddy. Roasiah's tenure short lived. Reddys had good standings with many industry leaders and politicians.
