= G. Somashekara Reddy =

Indian politician

Gali Somashekhara Reddy is an Indian politician from the state of Karnataka associated with the BJPparty. He is an (MLA) Vidhan Sabha 2 times of Karnataka representing the Bellary Assembly constituency for the Bharatiya Janata Party.

He was also the chairman of Karnataka Milk Federation. He is a member of the Reddy family that owns the Obulapuram Mining Company with iron ore mining interests in Karnataka and Andhra Pradesh, and that has been facing allegations of illegal mining in forest lands. His brothers G. Janardhana Reddy and G. Karunakara Reddy had been ministers in the Karnataka state government led by CM B. S. Yeddyurappa of the BJP.

After D. V. Sadananda Gowda of the BJP took over as CM from Yeddyurappa following the Lokayukta report on illegal mining in 2011, Reddy was removed from the BJP's Karnataka state government ministry. Subsequently, Yeddyurappa broke away from the BJP to form the Karnataka Janata Paksha (KJP) and the Reddy brothers joined up with B. Sriramulu to form the BSR Congress party.

== Abetment of Judicial Bribery and Detention ==
The CBI is also investigating the bribing of Hyderabad Special Court judge Pattabhirama Rao to secure bail for G. Janardhana Reddy in the Obulapuram Mining Company case, by his family members including G. Karunakara Reddy. Further investigations by CBI implicated others, including a retired judge T.V. Chalapathi Rao, in the "Cash for Bail" scandal. He was later arrested and sent to judicial custody in the episode.
