= Dr. Marri Channa Reddy Human Resource Development Institute of Telangana =

Training institute in Hyderabad, Telangana, India

Coordinates: 17.442725°N 78.407573°E

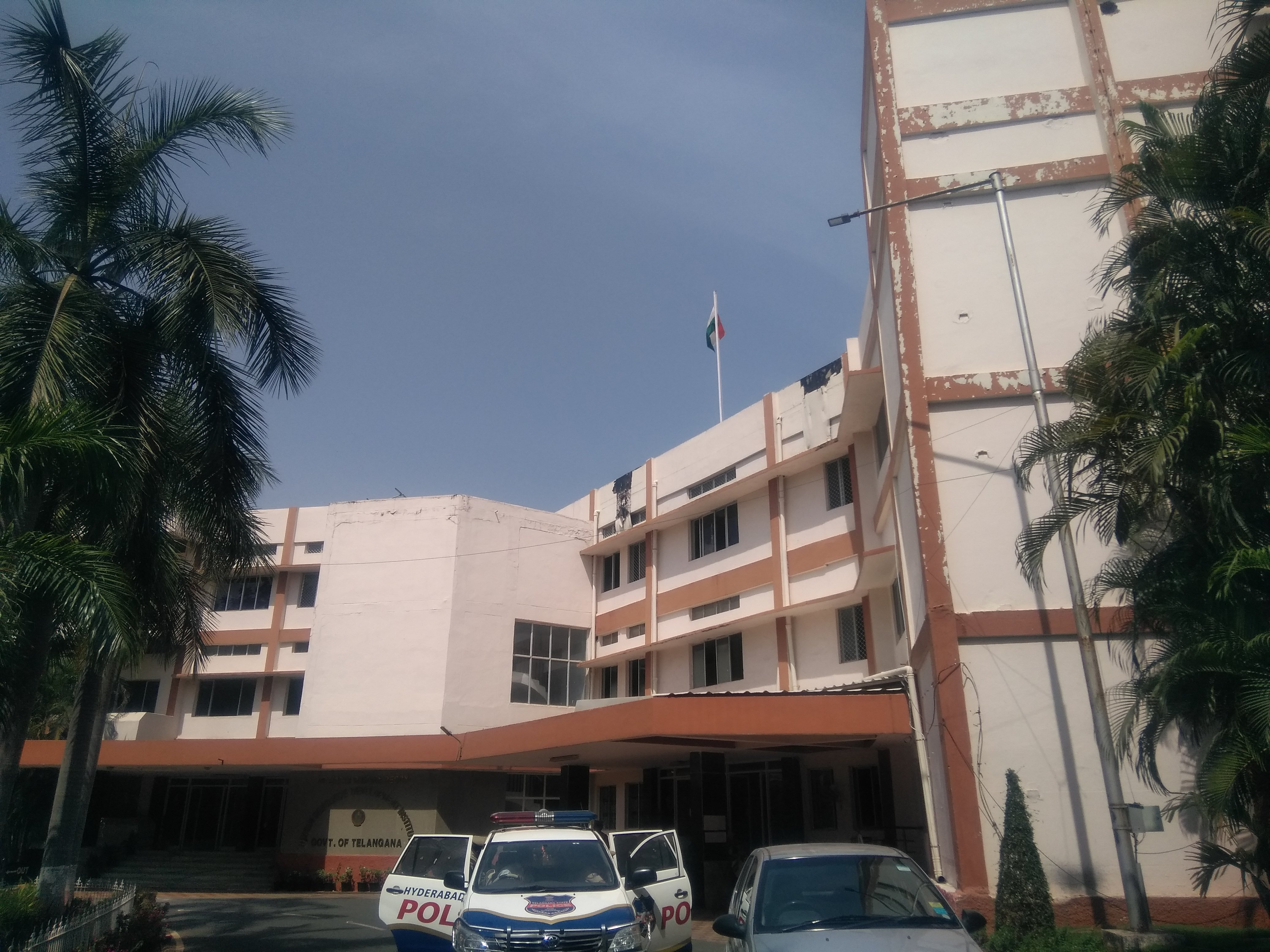
- Dr.Marri Chenna Reddy Human Resource Development Institute
- Established: 1976; 50 years ago
- Director: Dr. Shashank Goel, IAS
- Location: Jubilee Hills, Hyderabad, Telangana, India
- Campus: Urban, 45 acres (18.2 ha)
- Website: https://www.mcrhrdi.gov.in/

Dr. Marri Chenna Reddy Human Resource Development Institute of Telangana is a training institute for civil servants and government officials of Government of Telangana located in Hyderabad, Telangana, India.

MCRHRD offers a diverse range of training programs and courses, including short-term and long-term programs, in-person and online training, and customized programs for specific organizations or groups.

MCRHRD also conducts research, consultancy services, and policy analysis in the areas of human resource development, management, and governance.

== History ==
The institute started as Institute of Administration in 1972. It was renamed in 1998 after former Chief Minister of united Andhra Pradesh, Dr. Marri Chenna Reddy.

== Campus ==
The institute is located on a verdant 45-acre campus. It was expanded in 2006 with 375 centrally air-conditioned rooms. It also has a helipad on its premises. It has a guesthouse with 15 rooms.
