= Indian Rice Exporters Federation =

Indian trade association

- Abbreviation: IREF
- Formation: 2023
- Type: Trade association
- Headquarters: Connaught Place
- Location: New Delhi, India
- Region served: India
- Website: https://iref.net

Indian Rice Exporters Federation (IREF) is an Indian trade association which represents rice exporters, traders, and millers.

The organization provides services in policy advocacy and trade promotion, and represents exporters in discussions with government bodies such as the Ministry of Commerce and Industry and the Agricultural and Processed Food Products Export Development Authority.

== History ==
Indian Rice Exporters Federation (IREF) was founded in 2023 with the aim to provide an unified platform for stakeholders in India’s rice export ecosystem. The organization was established after seeing a growing global demand of Indian rice. The national president of Indian Rice Exporters Federation was chosen by voting process.

In 2025, The Indian Government and IREF took a decision to mandate registration of non-basmati rice export contracts with Agricultural and Processed Food Products Export Development Authority.

Moving forward of Union Budget 2026, IREF provides fiscal support including freight assistance, tax incentives and interest subvention.

According to the IREF, India maintains its position as the world's largest rice exporter, supplying both premium and mass market varieties to markets across Asia, Africa, and the Middle East, with annual export volumes reaching an estimated 21 to 22 million tonnes.

The federation is scheduled to host the Bharat International Rice Conference at Bharat Mandapam in New Delhi in October 2026. The conference plans to feature a "Global Rice Archive" displaying approx. 200 domestic and international rice varieties to promote non-Basmati agricultural exports.

=== International Trade Promotion ===
IREF manages activities including trade facilitation, policy advocacy, and market outreach. It organizes conferences, buyer–seller meets, and industry consultations promoting Indian rice in international markets.

Ministry of Consumer Affairs, Food and Public Distribution partnered with IREF to host Bharat International Rice Conference (BIRC) in October 2025. BIRC is an international industry event organization which brought exporters, policymakers, and research institutions together to explore new global markets for Indian rice.
