= G. Janardhana Reddy =

Indian politician and businessman (born 1967)

Gali Janardhana Reddy

Member of Karnataka Legislative Assembly
- Incumbent
- Assumed office 13 May 2023
- Preceded by: Paranna Munavalli
- Succeeded by: TBD
- Constituency: Gangawati

Minister of Tourism Department and Infrastructure Development of Karnataka
- In office 30 May 2008 – 3 August 2011
- Preceded by: B Sriramulu
- Succeeded by: Anand Singh
- Constituency: Ballari

Member of Karnataka Legislative Council
- In office 18 June 2006 – May 2011
- Constituency: Karnataka Legislative Council

Personal details
- Born: 11 January 1967 (age 59) Ballari, Mysuru State (present-day Karnataka), India
- Party: Bharatiya Janata Party
- Spouse: Gali Aruna Lakshmi
- Children: Brahmani, Kireeti
- Relatives: G. Karunakara Reddy (Elder brother); G. Somashekara Reddy (Younger brother); G. Rajeshwari Reddy (Elder sister)
- Occupation: Businessman (GJR Group CMD)
- Website: Website

Gali Janardhana Reddy (born 11 January 1967) is an Indian politician and businessman who has been serving as a Member of the Karnataka Legislative Assembly from the Gangawati Assembly constituency since 13 May 2023 being associated with the Kalyana Rajya Pragathi Paksha. He rejoined Bharatiya Janata Party on 25 March 2024.

== Early life and education ==
Reddy was born on 11 January 1967. He has two brothers, G. Karunakara Reddy and G. Somashekara Reddy, and an elder sister, Rajeswari. He and his siblings were born in Bellary, Karnataka to Rukminamma and Chenga Reddy, a police constable. His family originally hails from Chittoor, Andhra Pradesh.

Janardhana Reddy has a pre-university college education.

== Career ==
Reddy is both an entrepreneur and a politician, and he owns a gold company.

=== As an Entrepreneur ===
At the age of 21, Reddy established a residuary non-banking finance company called, Ennoble India Savings & Investment Company Limited, under the RBI in 1989. Across South India, the company had a total of 125 branches with a turnover of 350 crores. While the company was still functioning, it has stopped collecting deposits from 2003. He surrendered the Certificate of Registration to the RBI as the RBI stated in an advertisement made on the national news paper The Hindu that "M/s Ennoble India Savings and Investment Co.Ltd., having its Registered Office at 6(4), Raghavachari Road, Opposite Radhika Theatre, Bellary -583 101, has violated various provisions of Reserve Bank of India’s Directions relating to acceptance of deposits, investment in approved securities and submission of stipulated returns to the Bank. The financial position of the Company is not satisfactory and its Net Owned Fund has turned negative. The bank has, therefore, prohibited the Company with effect from October 05, 1998 from accepting deposits from any person including the existing depositors /certificate holders, in any form whether by way of subscriptions / instalments to any scheme conducted by the Company or by way of renewal of deposit or otherwise." In 2001, he took over Obulapuram Mining Company (OMCPL) which had an iron-ore mining lease. Allegedly, his political clout helped him to get the iron-ore mining license in Anantapur district of Andhra Pradesh in 2004. The government of Andhra Pradesh allocated 10760 acres of land for the project. However, the project didn't take off and the land allotted was canceled in 2013.

=== As a politician ===
Reddy came into political spotlight during the 1999 Lok Sabha elections when the Reddy brothers were working as part of Sushma Swaraj's campaign. At the time, Swaraj had been competing as a Bharatiya Janata Party (BJP) candidate in Bellary against Sonia Gandhi, who belonged to the Indian National Congress, to become the MP. Although Swaraj was unsuccessful, she remained a patron of the Reddys and was known to visit Bellary frequently. After the Reddy brothers were charged during the mining scandal, Swaraj distanced herself from them. The allegations against Reddy brought a bad reputation for the BJP in Karnataka and exposed opportunistic politics in the state.

In 2006, due to the BJP - Janta Dal (Secular) (JDS) coalition government and the efforts of Reddy, B. Sriramulu was made a Cabinet Minister. In 2006, Reddy was made a Member of the Legislative Council to recognize his active role in increasing the BJP presence in Bellary. However, in later years, Reddy fought with Chief Minister H. D. Kumaraswamy, and made allegations, and provided evidence of corruption, resulting in his suspension.

However, H. D. Kumaraswamy did not hand over the government to B. S. Yeddyurappa at the required time. The State President of the party at the time, D. V. Sadananda Gowda and B. S. Yeddyurappa revoked Reddy’s suspension who then campaigned alongside Yeddyurappa for BJP during the Assembly Elections of 2008. Aided by Reddy’s efforts, BJP emerged as the single largest party with 110 seats and with the support of 5 independent MLA’s, BJP formed a government in South India for the first time on its own.

Reddy was then inducted as the Minister for Tourism and Infrastructure and the Minister in-charge of the Bellary district, setting many developmental milestones for the state and for Bellary during this period. In spite of allegations made against Reddy and his period of judicial custody, Reddy remains a popular politician which was witnessed by the state on 29 January 2017 when Reddy received a standing ovation from a large crowd at the HemaVema function in the palace grounds in Bangalore. Reddy did not contest the Karnataka assembly polls in 2018; however, his brothers, Sriramulu and four other candidates close to Reddy received a BJP ticket.

On 25 December 2022, Reddy quit BJP and soon announced the launching of a new political outfit called "Kalyana Rajya Pragati Paksha".

In the May 2023 Legislative assembly elections for Karnataka, Reddy made a remarkable comeback to active politics by winning the Gangavathi assembly segment contesting on the Kalyana Rajya Pragathi Party ticket.

On March 25, 2024 he merged his party, Kalyana Rajya Pragathi Party, into the BJP before the 2024 Indian General Election.

== Social service ==
Reddy runs a school for mentally disabled children since 1997 and an old age home from 2004 with his own funds.

== Controversies ==
Over the years, Reddy has been involved in many controversies.

=== Operation Kamala ===
Operation Lotus, also known as Operation Kamala, is a term coined in 2008 to describe a political strategy used by the Bharatiya Janata Party (BJP) in the Indian state of Karnataka. The operation was led by former minister G. Janardhana Reddy and involved efforts to secure support from legislators of opposition parties. This approach enabled the BJP to bypass the provisions of the anti-defection law and achieve a majority in the state assembly.

The term "Kamala" (or "Kamal") refers to the lotus, which is the electoral symbol of the BJP. Operation Kamala is commonly used in Indian political discussions to describe strategies involving the inducement or persuasion of MLAs and MPs from other parties—particularly the Indian National Congress (INC)—to support the BJP in forming or maintaining power in state legislatures where it does not have an outright majority.

=== Illegal Mining ===
In July 2011, the Lokayukta of Karnataka, Santosh Hegde, published a report on the illegal mining activities in the Bellary region. Reddy was accused of completely rigging iron ore mining in this area and defrauding the government. Directorate General of Income Tax Investigation officials had clues to tax evasion and found that Reddy had entered into a Memorandum of Understanding with a one-dollar company in Singapore to camouflage the company's income suppression. They raided the place along with other investigative agencies and formed a report which served as the basis of the report on illegal mining. Reddy is said to have designed a "Zero-Risk system" of iron ore mining, where he seamlessly provided protection to unauthorized and unaccounted mining, with active connivance from government officials at all levels. The rule of the iron ore mafia under his command was called the "Republic of Bellary" in which no external control or governance mechanism had any effect.

=== Bribery ===
The CBI is investigating the alleged bribing of the Hyderabad Special Court judge T. Pattabhirama Rao by Reddy's family members (G.Somashekar Reddy & H.Suresh Babu) in order to secure his bail in the Obulapuram Mining Company case. Further investigations by CBI implicated others, including a retired judge T.V. Chalapathi Rao, in the "Cash for Bail" scandal. The IT department issued notices and Reddy provided an explanation to the department but these explanations were rejected by the CIT Appeals. He preferred to appeal in all the matters before the Hon'ble ITAT and the Hon'ble Tribunal has allowed all appeals in his favour by dismissing the stand taken by the IT department. 132456821541

=== Daughter's Wedding ===
Reddy was criticised over the lavish wedding of his daughter, Brahmani, which was held in Palace Grounds, Bangalore. He allegedly spent 500 crores ($71 million) for his daughter's wedding. Brahmani married a 23-year-old MBA graduate who hails from a family operating gold mines in South Africa, Tanzania and granite marble businesses in Turkey.

== Arrest and conviction ==
Reddy was arrested on 5 September 2011 by the CBI, and taken to Hyderabad, Andhra Pradesh. He is accused of involvement in illegal mining of iron ore in Bellary in Karnataka and Anantapur in Andhra Pradesh. This investigation is the culmination of a recommendation to the Income Tax Department and CBI by the former Andhra Pradesh chief minister K. Rosaiah and is not directly related to the findings of Karnataka Lokayukta Santosh Hegde. Once the CBI Court heard the lawyers' representations, he along with his brother-in-law, B. V. Srinivas Reddy, was remanded to judicial custody and sent to Chanchalguda Central Jail. The CBI also arrested senior officers of the IAS and IRS during ongoing investigations. On 4 August 2012, a CBI court extended the judicial custody of Janardhana Reddy and four others arrested in the illegal mining case until 7 September. On 21 January 2015, the Supreme Court granted his bail. The Supreme court agreed to hear Janardhana Reddy's appeal to visit Ballari on 24 May 2021.

The CBI court in Hyderabad on 6 May 2025 convicted Gali Janardhan Reddy and three others in the Obulapuram Mining Company (OMC) illegal mining case. After a long 13-year trial, the court sentenced them to seven years' imprisonment and imposed a fine of Rs 10,000 on each.
