= Belekeri =

- village
- Location in Karnataka, India Belekeri (India)
- Coordinates: 14.7°N 74.267°E
- Country: India
- State: Karnataka

Government
  - Body: Gram panchayat

Languages
  - Official: Kannada
- Time zone: UTC+5:30 (IST)
- ISO 3166 code: IN-KA

Belekeri is a village in Ankola, Karnataka, India, and is known for its fish. It is approximately 6 km from Ankola. Its industrial port is used for shipping iron ore and manganese to various destinations, including China. The port came to a wide media attention due to the Belekeri port scam. Belekeri port is on bank of Hattikeri River.

== History ==
Historically, the port was used by the British. The village has ancient historical significance as it houses an inscription which is more than 500 years old. It has Jainabeera temple, which is of a great significance to the villagers. Inhabited communities are Nadavaru Nador, Kharvi(Fishermen caste), Komarpant, Halakki Vokkaliga, Shetti(Vaishya), Ager etc.

== Belekeri Port ==
Karnataka plans development of non-major transhipment port with Rs 3,000 crore is likely to be invested in greenfield port at Belekeri.

== Belekeri Harbour ==
The fishing harbour is suitable for moderate weathers. If proper improvements are brought about, it can greatly increase its capacity. Government of Karnataka has planned to improve it under Public-Private partnership. Justice Santosh Hegde, the then Lokayukta of Karnataka, is also reported to have expressed his concerns over the illegal activities.

== Environmental issues ==
The export activity caused sufferings to over 3500 people. Fishermen have also expressed concerns over damages to their fishing activities. But, pressures to start the mining and ore-exporting are on the rise in Karnataka.

== Beach ==
Grassy lawns are a common sight. The sunsets are pleasing to the eyes. The place also has hills around. The beach is not far away from other tourist attractions like Gokarna. The nearest railway station to Belekeri is the Ankola railway station, which is about 11 km away.

== See also ==
- Mangalore
- Ankola
- New Mangalore Port
