= Agricultural and Processed Food Products Export Development Authority =

Statutory body in India

Statutory body overview
- Formed: 13 February 1986; 39 years ago
- Preceding Statutory body: Processed Food Export Promotion Council (PFEPC)
- Type: Statutory body
- Jurisdiction: Government of India
- Headquarters: New Delhi, India
- Minister responsible: Piyush Goyal, Minister of Commerce and Industry
- Statutory body executives: Abhishek Dev, IAS, Chairman; Dr. Saswati Bose, General Manager
- Parent department: Department of Commerce
- Parent ministry: Ministry of Commerce and Industry
- Website: apeda.gov.in

The Agricultural and Processed Food Products Export Development Authority (APEDA) is a statutory body established in 1986 under the Ministry of Commerce and Industry, Government of India, to promote the export and development of agricultural and processed food products in India. It also monitors the import of sugar. APEDA also functions as the secretariat to the National Accreditation Board (NAB) for the implementation of accreditation of the certification bodies under National Programme for Organic Production (NPOP) for organic exports. It is headquartered in New Delhi.

== History ==
It was established by the Agriculture and Processed Food products Export Development Authority Act passed by the Parliament of India in December 1985, which came into force on 13 February 1986. The Authority replaced the erstwhile Processed Food Export Promotion Council (PFEPC).

== Functions ==
Its primary function is to promote the export and development of agricultural and processed food products in India. It also monitors the import of sugar. APEDA also functions as the secretariat to the National Accreditation Board (NAB) for the implementation of accreditation of the certification bodies under National Programme for Organic Production (NPOP) for organic exports.

APEDA is the premier body of export promotion of fresh vegetables and fruits. It provides the crucial interface between farmers, storehouses, packers, exporters, surface transport, ports, Railways, Airways, and all others engaged in export trade to the international market.

== See also ==
Federation of Indian Export Organisations
