= Maibang =

- Town
- Location in Assam, India
- Coordinates: 25°17′43″N 093°08′22″E
- Country: India
- State: Assam
- District: Dima Hasao

Government
  - Type: Maibang Town Committee

Area
  - Total: 10 km^{2} (3.9 sq mi)
- Elevation: 355 m (1,165 ft)

Population (2011)
  - Total: 6,236
  - Density: 620/km^{2} (1,600/sq mi)

Languages
  - Most common: Bengali, Dimasa, Hindi, Assamese
- Time zone: UTC+5:30 (IST)
- PIN: 788831
- Telephone code: +91
- Vehicle registration: AS-08-X XXXX

Maibang (IPA: mai-bang [mai means rice and bang means much], defining a land of prosperity) is a town and a town area committee in Dima Hasao district in the Indian state of Assam. Maibang is also one of the three sub-divisions of Dima Hasao District. It was once the capital of the Dimasa Kachari Kingdom. There is a stone house of Dimasa king.

== History ==
Maibang was the capital of the erstwhile Dimasa kingdom, from the 16th to 18th century. The ruins of the kingdom can still be found on the eastern bank of Mahur, south of Maibang and other parts of Dima Hasao district. Among them the most popular is "Stone House" (In Dimasa it is called "Longthai ni Noh") situated on the bank of Mahur River on south Maibang.

== Administration ==
Maibang falls under the administrative jurisdiction of the Dima Hasao district in Assam. As an autonomous district, Dima Hasao has a unique administrative structure distinct from other districts in Assam.Dima Hasao is governed by the Dima Hasao Autonomous Council (DHAC), which is constituted under the Sixth Schedule of the Constitution of India.

The SDO in Maibang is responsible for the day-to-day administrative functions within the Maibang sub-division, coordinating with various government departments and ensuring the implementation of policies and schemes at the local level.

== Geography ==
Maibang town is situated in a hilly area at the bank of Mahur River. Its coordinates are 25.3°N 93.17°E. It has an average elevation of 355 metres (1,165 feet).

The town area is about 10 square kilometres.

== Demographics ==
As of 2022, the majority religion was Hinduism.

Religions in Maibang
Religion	Percent
Hinduism	95.11%
Islam	3.58%
Sikhism	1.11%
Christianity	0.11%
Others	0.09%

=== Languages ===
Languages spoken in Maibang (2011)
1. Bengali (50.3%)
2. Dimasa (27.6%)
3. Hindi (8.95%)
4. Assamese (3.94%)
5. Others (9.29%)

Bengali is the most spoken language at 3,134 speakers, followed by Dimasa at 1,719, Hindi is spoken by 558 people and Assamese at 246. Dimasa is the dialect of the majority Dimasa tribe of the district. The dialect is yet to be recognized as a language. "Hill Hindi" or "Haflong Hindi" is used as the lingua franca. The languages of instruction in the schools and colleges are Assamese, Bengali and English up to HSLC level in the schools of the town.

== Economy ==
=== Tourism ===
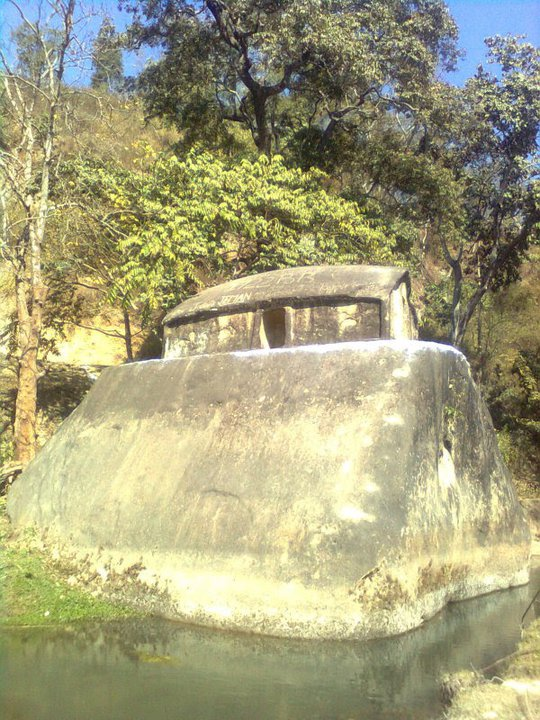
A monolith monument called "Stone house" at Maibang, also popularly known as "Longthaini Noh"

Tourist attractions in Maibang include:

- Rajbari: ruins of city of the Kachari Kingdom, on the south side of Maibang.
- Ramchandi Temple / Stone house: a monolithic ancient Indian temple from the 12th century with two roofs.
- Maibang Waterfalls: Maibang has several water falls around the city.
- Dimasa Heritage Museum and Dishru Research Centre, located in Kashmaipur.

== Transport ==
Broad gauge railway connections are:

Train Name	Train Number	From	To	Arrival	Departure
Guwahati Silchar Fast Passenger	15615	Guwahati	Silchar	06:49 AM	06:51 AM
Guwahati Silchar Fast Passenger	15616	Silchar	Guwahati	01:15 PM	01:17 PM
Guwahati - Badarpur Vistadome Express	15888(Wed/Sat)	Guwahati	Badarpur	10:53 AM	10:55 AM
Guwahati - Badarpur Vistadome Express	15887(Wed/Sat)	Badarpur	Guwahati	06:38 PM	06:40 PM

Metre gauge railway connections that stopped in November 2014:

Train Name	Train Number	From	To	Arrival	Departure
Cachar Express	15691	Lumding	Silchar	10:29 PM	10:39 PM
Cachar Express	15692	Silchar	Lumding	04:09	04:19
Barak Valley Exp.	15693	Lumding	Dharmanagar	06:48	06:58
Barak Valley Express	15694	Dharmanagar	Lumding	18:49	18:59
Agartala Express	15695	Lumding	Agartala	23:34	23:44
Agartal Express	15696	Agartala	Lumding	07:46	07:56
Hill Queen Express	05697	Lumding	Haflong	11:41	11:51
Hill Queen Express	05698	Haflong	Lumding	15:10	15:20

== Education ==
Maibang Degree College (established in 1988) is the only college in the civil sub-division of Dima Hasao district. The college offers both pass and honours course in the Arts and Science stream. The college is one of the provincial colleges of the Government of Assam and affiliated to Assam University, Silchar (a Central University of GOI). The subjects offered in the college are Bengali (MIL, Elective & Honours), Assamese (MIL), English (General, Alternative, Elective & Honors), History (Pass & Honours), Economics (Pass & Honours), Education (Pass & Honours), Political Science (Pass & Honours) and Sociology (Pass & Honours). There is also a study centre of Krishna Kanta Handique State Open University in the college which offers a Bachelors' Preparatory Programme, BA (Both Pass & Honours) and an MA in Sociology. A good number of learners are admitted to different courses at this study centre.

All schools of Maibang are run either by the state government or by private organizations. English is the primary languages of instruction in most of the schools. However, the newly established private schools are opting for English medium. The schools are recognized to Board of Secondary Education, Assam (SEBA) and Assam Higher Secondary Education Council (AHSEC). Ever Green High School and St. Xavier’s High School is a notable school in the town.
