= Dullabcherra–Badarpur Passenger =

Train in India

55689/UP/Dullabcherra - Badarpur Passenger
Overview
- Service type: Passenger
- Locale: Assam (Barak Valley)
- First service: Fri Mar 31, 2017
- Current operator: Northeast Frontier Railway
- Ridership: 585 approx.

Route
- Termini: Dullabcherra (DLCR); Badarpur Junction (BPB)
- Stops: 14
- Distance travelled: 71 km (44 mi)
- Average journey time: 3 hours 45 mins
- Service frequency: Tri-weekly (Note: Runs seven days in a week for every direction.)
- Train number: 55689

On-board services
- Class: General (6) SLR (1)
- Seating arrangements: Available
- Sleeping arrangements: Not Available
- Auto-rack arrangements: Not Available
- Catering facilities: ✕ Pantry Car ✕ On-board Catering ✕ E-Catering
- Observation facilities: Windows
- Baggage facilities: Under Seat & Upper rakes

Technical
- Rolling stock: ICF rakes
- Track gauge: BG
- Electrification: Not Available
- Operating speed: 19 Kmph

Dullabcherra Badarpur Passenger is a passenger train belonging to Northeast Frontier Railway zone of Indian Railways that runs between Dullabcherra and Badarpur Junction. It is currently being operated with 55689 train number on tri-weekly basis. The train makes its main halt at Karimganj Junction for 25 minutes & the loco/rake reversals also takes place here. The train runs with SGUJ/WDP-4D.

== Average speed and frequency ==
The 55689/Dullavcherra Badarpur Passenger runs with an average speed of 19 km/h and completes 71 km in 3h 45m.

== Route and halts ==
The important halts of the train are:

- Ratabari
- Baraigram Junction
- Karimganj Junction

== Coach composite ==
The train has standard ICF rakes with average speed of 19 kmph. The train consists of 7 coaches:

- 6 General Unreserved
- 1 Seating cum Luggage Rake

== Traction ==
Both trains are hauled by a Guwahati Loco Shed based WDM 3A diesel locomotive from Dullabcherra to Badarpur and vice versa.

== Rake sharing ==
The train shares its rake with 55687/55688 Dullabcherra–Silchar Fast Passenger.

== Direction reversal ==
Train reverses its direction 1 time:

- Karimganj Junction
