= Kolkata–Agartala Garib Rath Express =

Train service in India

Kolkata – Agartala Garib Rath Express

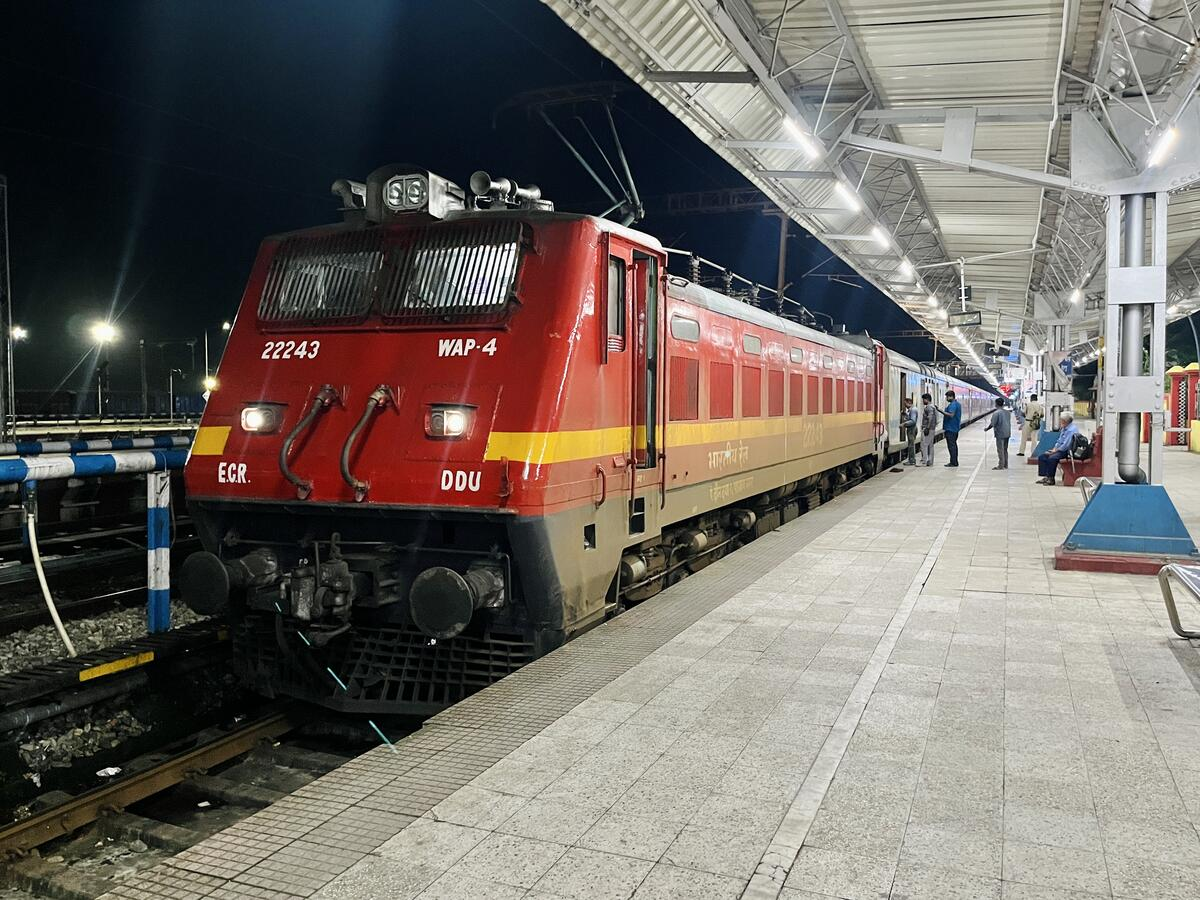

Overview
- Service type: Garib Rath Express
- Status: Active
- Locale: Tripura, Assam, Bihar and West Bengal
- First service: 5 July 2024; 2 years ago
- Current operator: Northeast Frontier Railway

Route
- Termini: Kolkata (KOAA); Agartala (AGTL)
- Stops: 22
- Distance travelled: 1588 km
- Service frequency: Weekly (Note: Runs once in a week for every direction.)
- Train number: 12501/12502

On-board services
- Class: AC 3 Tier Economy (3E)
- Seating arrangements: Available
- Sleeping arrangements: Available
- Catering facilities: Available
- Observation facilities: Large windows
- Baggage facilities: Below the seats

Technical
- Rolling stock: Linke-Hofmann-Busch (LHB) coach
- Track gauge: 1,676 mm (5 ft 6 in)
- Operating speed: 110 km/h (68 mph)

The 12501 / 12502 Kolkata–Agartala Garib Rath Express is a Garib Rath class train of Indian Railways, which connects the state capital of West Bengal, Kolkata to the state capital of Tripura, Agartala. It is the newest train service of its class. The train is operated by the North East Frontier Railway Zone (NFR) of the Indian Railways.

== History ==
The train was originally launched as an air-conditioned special train after the COVID-19 pandemic. Due to poor patronage, the service was repeatedly scrapped and reintroduced, before on 21 June 2024, the North East Frontier Railway Zone informed the public of the introduction of the Kolkata - Agartala Garib Rath service from July onwards, practically regularising the special train. The first service commenced on 5 July 2024.

== Service ==
- The 12501 Kolkata - Agartala Garib Rath Express leaves Kolkata at 21:45 hrs every Sunday and reaches Agartala the day after the next day at 06:55 hrs. It covers the journey in 33 hours 10 minutes averaging at 50 km/h (31 mph).
- The 12502 Agartala – Kolkata Garib Rath Express leaves Agartala at 07:30 hrs every Wednesday and reaches Kolkata the next day at 14:35 hrs. It covers the journey in 31 hours 05 minutes averaging at 51 km/h (32 mph).

== Coach composition ==
The Kolkata–Agartala Garib Rath Express consists of 22 Linke-Hoffman Busch Third AC Economy (3E) coaches (since ICF cancelled the train inaugurated with LHB Red coach). (Note: Usually the "M" notation is used to represent this class, but in Garib Rath trains, it is represented by the "G" notation) It has a single rake, which it shares with the Kolkata - Guwahati Garib Rath Express. Primary maintenance is executed at Agartala and secondary maintenance at Guwahati.

Legends
EOG/SLR	PC	MIL	H	A	HA	B	AB	G	K	E	C	S	D	GEN/UR
Generator cum luggage van	Pantry car or Hot buffet car	Military coach	First AC (1A)	Second AC (2A)	First AC cum Second AC	Third AC (3A)	Third AC cum Second AC	Third AC economy (3E)	Anubhuti coach (K)	Executive chair car (EC)	AC Chair car (CC)	Sleeper class (SL)	Second seating (2S)	General or Unreserved
	Loco and other service coach													
	AC coach													
	Non-AC coach													

Coach Position of 12501 (ex. Kolkata)

Loco	1	2	3	4	5	6	7	8	9	10	11	12	13	14	15	16	17	18	19	20	21	22
	EOG	G20	G19	G18	G17	G16	G15	G14	G13	G12	G11	G10	G9	G8	G7	G6	G5	G4	G3	G2	G1	EOG

Coach Position of 12502 (ex. Agartala)

Loco	1	2	3	4	5	6	7	8	9	10	11	12	13	14	15	16	17	18	19	20	21	22
	EOG	G1	G2	G3	G4	G5	G6	G7	G8	G9	G10	G11	G12	G13	G14	G15	G16	G17	G18	G19	G20	EOG

Passengers are advised to check the coach position indicators at the station before boarding.

== Traction ==
The train is hauled by a Howrah based WAP-4 or a Sealdah based WAP-7 electric locomotive to New Cooch Behar station. From there, it is hauled by a Siliguri based WDP-4 or a WDP-4D diesel locomotive to its destination.

== Route and halts ==
The stoppages are:-

- Kolkata
- Bandel Junction
- Nabadwip Dham
- Katwa Junction
- Azimganj Junction
- Jangipur Road
- Malda Town
- Kishanganj
- New Jalpaiguri Junction
- New Cooch Behar
- New Alipurduar
- Kokrajhar
- New Bongaigaon Junction
- Goalpara Town
- Guwahati
- Manderdisa Junction
- New Haflong
- Badarpur Junction
- New Karimganj Junction
- Dharmanagar
- Agartala

== Other trains on the Kolkata–New Jalpaiguri sector ==
- 22301/02 Howrah–New Jalpaiguri Vande Bharat Express
- 12041/42 New Jalpaiguri–Howrah Shatabdi Express
- 12377/78 Padatik Express
- 12343/44 Darjeeling Mail
- 15959/60 Kamrup Express (via Guwahati)
- 15961/62 Kamrup Express (via Bogibeel)
- 13173/74 Sealdah–Agartala Kanchanjunga Express
- 13175/76 Sealdah–Silchar Kanchanjunga Express
- 12345/46 Saraighat Express
- 15721/22 New Jalpaiguri-Digha Express
- 13141/42 Teesta Torsha Express
- 13147/48 Uttar Banga Express
- 13149/50 Kanchan Kanya Express
- 13181/82 Kolkata–Silghat Town Kaziranga Express
- 22511/12 Lokmanya Tilak Terminus–Kamakhya Karmabhoomi Express
- 15643/44 Puri–Kamakhya Weekly Express (via Howrah)
- 12363/64 Kolkata–Haldibari Intercity Express
- 13115/16 Sealdah - Jalpaiguri Road Humsafar Express

== See also ==
- Garib Rath Express
- Kolkata - Guwahati Garib Rath Express
