= Cachar Express =

Train line in India

Cachhar Express
Overview
- Service type: Mail/Express
- Locale: Assam
- First service: March 16, 1914
- Last service: September 28, 2014
- Current operator: Northeast Frontier Railways

Route
- Termini: Lumding Junction; Silchar
- Stops: 12
- Distance travelled: 213 km (132 mi)
- Average journey time: 11 hours 50 mins
- Service frequency: Daily
- Train number: 15691/15692

On-board services
- Classes: Sleeper (6); General (3); SLR (2)
- Seating arrangements: Available
- Sleeping arrangements: Available
- Auto-rack arrangements: Not available
- Catering facilities: Not available
- Observation facilities: Windows
- Entertainment facilities: Not available
- Baggage facilities: Under seat

Technical
- Rolling stock: MG ICF rakes
- Track gauge: MG
- Electrification: Not available
- Operating speed: Avg speed: 18 km/h (11 mph)

The Cachhar Express was a daily Indian Railways Meter-gauge overnight express train from Lumding Junction (nearest broad-gauge rail link of Silchar) to Silchar (second largest city of Assam) and vice versa, both stations are situated in the Indian state of Assam. The train was numbered as 15691 and 15692 respectively. The train service is suspended now as the route in which it used to run is now converted from metre gauge to broad gauge.

== History ==
Originally, the train ran between Guwahati (capital of the state Assam) and Silchar when introduced in 1914 by the British. The British introduced 6 important trains after the Lumding-Badarpur Junction MG line was completed in 1914. These were 2 MG trains between Guwahati and Silchar, 1 MG train between Silchar & Sylhet, 1 MG Train between Silchar & Dhaka, 1 MG Train between Dhaka & Hailakandi & 1 between Guwahati & Dhaka. In 1947 after partition, 4 trains were permanently withdrawn with only 2 MG trains between Guwahati and Silchar running until 1992. After conversion of Guwahati–Lumding to broad gauge in 1992, the originating and ending station of these train was changed to Lumding. This train was the first option for the passengers, who were willing to travel by train between Silchar and Guwahati, as it was an overnight train. There was another train on that section, the Barak Valley Express; although this latter train was named Express, it used to run with a status of passenger train in its last days.

Before 1992 the train used to cover 393 kilometres (244 mi) distance in 15 hrs 30 mins with an average moving speed of 25 kilometres per hour (16 mph).

Post 1992, 15691 Cachhar Express used to depart Lumding at 20:15 pm reaching Silchar at 08.05 am and from Silchar as 15692 at 19:15 reaching Lumding at 07.05 am. The train used to cover a distance of 213 kilometres (132 mi) in 11 hours 50 in its up and down journey with an average moving speed of 18 kilometres per hour (11 mph).

The train was hauled by the YDM-4 class of Lumding meter-gauge diesel loco shed locomotive. 15692 used to be connected with two locos, one in front and another in the rear for pulling and pushing its way to the height of Barail Range, from Harangajao to Jatinga. The important halts of Cachhar Express were Langting, Maibang, Lower Haflong, Haflong Hill, Old Harangajao, Jatinga, Chandranathpur, Badarpur Junction, Katakhal Junction and Arunachal Junction. It had a length of 11 coaches with all non-AC accommodation; SL (6) GN (3) SLR (2).

The train used to pass through 36 tunnels in Barail Range made during the British era with the Longtharai Tunnel being the longest at 1,936 metres (6,352 ft). The Train used to pass through politically & ethnically volatile Dima Hasao region of Assam. Dacoity, Trainjacking like crimes were rampant.

Now since 2016, this entire route is converted to broad gauge. The broad-gauge successor of this train is the 15611/15612 Rangiya-Silchar Express.

== Major halts ==
- Lumding Junction; Start
- Langting
- Maibang
- Lower Haflong
- Haflong Hill
- Jatinga
- Old Harangajao
- Badarpur Junction
- Katakhal Junction
- Arunachal Junction
- Silchar; End
