= Visakhapatnam–Secunderabad Garib Rath Express =

Indian rail service

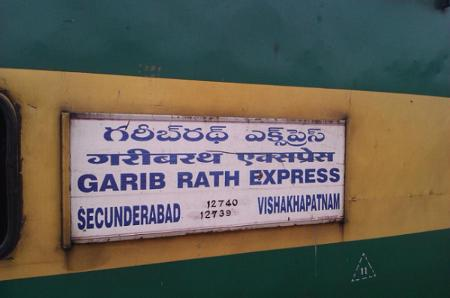
- VSKP-SC Garibrath

Overview
- Service type: Garib Rath Express
- Locale: Andhra Pradesh, Telangana
- First service: 26 October 2008; 17 years ago
- Current operator: South Central Railway

Route
- Termini: Visakhapatnam Junction; Secunderabad Junction
- Stops: 10
- Distance travelled: 701 km (436 mi)
- Average journey time: 11 hours 15 minutes
- Service frequency: Daily
- Train number: 12739 / 12740

On-board services
- Class: AC 3 Tier Economy
- Seating arrangements: Yes
- Sleeping arrangements: Yes
- Observation facilities: Large windows

Technical
- Rolling stock: LHB
- Track gauge: 1,676 mm (5 ft 6 in)
- Operating speed: 130 km/h (81 mph) (Top Speed); 64 km/h (40 mph) (average with halts)
Route map
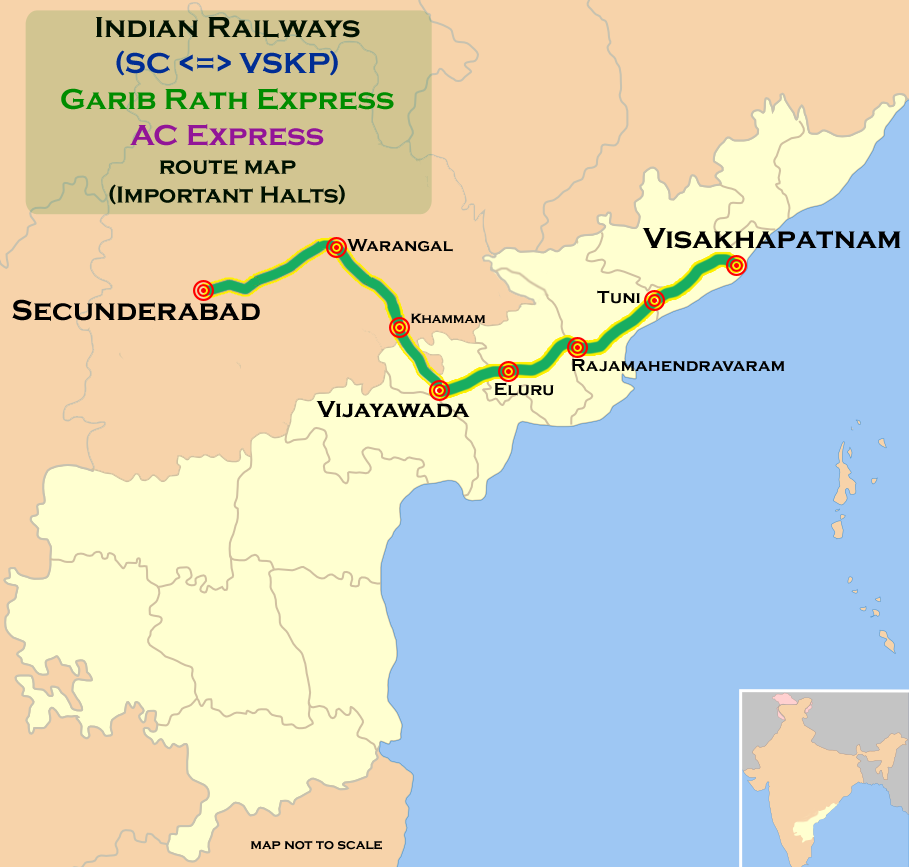

The Visakhapatnam–Secunderabad Garib Rath Express is a daily running superfast garib rath train of the Indian Railways connecting Secunderabad Railway Station to Visakhapatnam. This is the first and only Garib Rath to run daily. The train numbers are 12739 and 12740. It belongs to the South Central Railways. Train number 12740 runs from Secunderabad to Visakhapatnam and train number 12739 runs from Visakhapatnam to Secunderabad.

== Train details ==
=== Route ===
The train stops at Warangal, Khammam, Vijayawada, Eluru, Rajahmundry, Samalkot, Tuni, Anakapalle and Duvvada.

== Coaches ==
The rake initially had 3AC and AC Chair Car coaches; due to inconvenience in the AC Chair Car, it has been removed. Now the train runs with all 3AC coaches. When it was a non daily train, the rake was shared by Secunderabad Yesvantpur Garib Rath Express. But now it has a dedicated rake.
This train holds record for being the lengthiest Garib Rath Train in India. It has 20 AC Three Tier Economy Coaches and 2 EOG Power Cars making a total of 22 coaches.

Loco	1	2	3	4	5	6	7	8	9	10	11	12	13	14	15	16	17	18	19	20	21	22
	GD1	G1	G2	G3	G4	G5	G6	G7	G8	G9	G10	G11	G12	G13	G14	G15	G16	G17	G18	G19	G20	GD2

== Loco ==
It is regularly hauled by a Lallaguda WAP7 locomotive with a reversal at Vijayawada.

== See also ==
- List of trains run by Indian Railways
- Hyderabad–Visakhapatnam Godavari Express - A daily ICF train connecting Hyderabad Deccan to Visakhapatnam.
- Visakhapatnam–Secunderabad Duronto Express - A series of point-to-point, non-stop AC/Non-AC trains run in India.
- Secunderabad – Visakhapatnam AC Express - Weekly AC train
- Visakha Express - A daily ICF train connecting Secunderabad to Bhubaneshwar.
