= Kolkata–Ara Garib Rath Express =

Train in India

Kolkata - Ara Junction Garib Rath Express
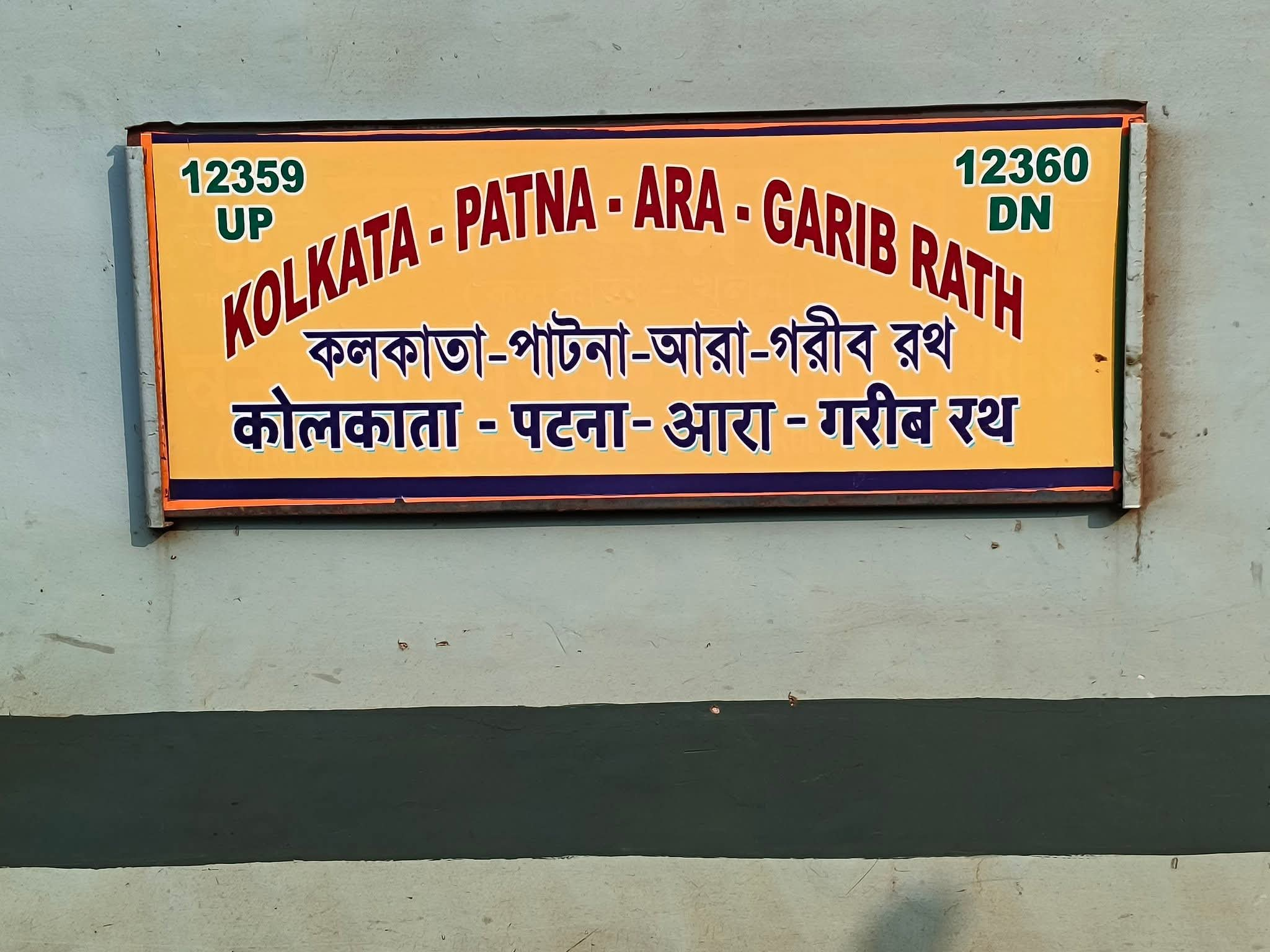

Overview
- Service type: Garib Rath Express
- Status: Active
- First service: 23 January 2008; 18 years ago
- Current operator: Eastern Railways

Route
- Termini: Kolkata (KOAA); Ara Junction (ARA)
- Stops: 15
- Distance travelled: 585 km (364 mi)
- Average journey time: 11 hours 40 minutes as 12359 Kolkata Ara Garib Rath Express, 11 hours 0 minutes as 12360 Ara Kolkata Garib Rath Express
- Service frequency: 3 days a week. 12359 Kolkata Ara Garib Rath Express - Tuesday, Thursday & Saturday. 12360 Ara Kolkata Garib Rath Express - Wednesday, Friday & Sunday.
- Train number: 12359/12360

On-board services
- Class: AC 3 Tier Economy
- Seating arrangements: No
- Sleeping arrangements: Yes
- Auto-rack arrangements: No
- Catering facilities: No
- Observation facilities: Dedicated rake
- Baggage facilities: Storage space under berth

Technical
- Rolling stock: Linke-Hofmann-Busch (LHB) coach
- Track gauge: 1,676 mm (5 ft 6 in)
- Electrification: Yes
- Operating speed: 130 km/h (81 mph) maximum

The 12359 / 60 Kolkata–Ara Garib Rath Express is a Superfast Express train of the Garib Rath series belonging to Indian Railways - Eastern Railway zone that runs between Kolkata and Ara Junction in India. The train was extended to Ara Junction from Patna Junction.

It operates as train number 12359 from Kolkata to Ara Junction and as train number 12360 in the reverse direction serving the states of West Bengal, Jharkhand & Bihar.

It is part of the Garib Rath Express series launched by the former railway minister of India, Mr. Laloo Prasad Yadav.

== Coaches ==
The 12359/60 Kolkata Ara Garib Rath Express has 15 AC 3 Tier Economy & 2 End on Generator Coaches. It does not carry a Pantry car coach.

As is customary with most train services in India, Coach Composition may be amended at the discretion of Indian Railways depending on demand.

== Service ==
The 12359 Kolkata Ara Garib Rath Express covers the distance of 585 km (364 mi) in 11 hours 40 mins (55.21 km/h) and in 11 hours 0 mins as 12360 Ara Kolkata Garib Rath Express (58.79 km/h).

As the average speed of the train is above 55 km/h (34 mph), as per Indian Railways rules, its fare includes a Superfast surcharge.

== Routeing ==
The 12359 / 60 Kolkata Ara Garib Rath Express runs from Kolkata via Durgapur, Asansol Junction, Jhajha, Mokama Junction, Rajendranagar Terminus, Patna Junction, Danapur to Ara Junction.

== Traction ==
As the route is fully electrified, a Howrah based WAP 5, Howrah based WAP 7 or a Sealdah based WAP 7 locomotive powers the train for its entire journey.

== Operation ==
12359 Kolkata Ara Garib Rath Express leaves Kolkata every Tuesday, Thursday & Saturday arriving Patna Junction the next day.

12360 Ara Kolkata Garib Rath Express leaves Ara Junction every Wednesday, Friday & Sunday arriving Kolkata the next day.
