= Katakhal Junction railway station =

Railway station in Assam

Katakhal Junction

General information
- Location: NH 37, Katakhal, Hailakandi district, Assam; India
- Coordinates: 24.8354°N 92.6267°E
- Elevation: 21 metres (69 ft)
- System: Indian Railways station
- Owner: Indian Railways
- Operator: Northeast Frontier Railway
- Line: Lumding–Sabroom section
- Platforms: 2
- Tracks: 4
- Connections: Auto stand

Construction
- Structure type: Standard (on ground station)
- Parking: No
- Cycle facilities: No

Other information
- Status: Active
- Station code: KTX
- Zone(s): Northeast Frontier Railway
- Division(s): Lumding
Location
- Location within Assam Location within India

Katakhal Junction railway station is a main railway station in Hailakandi district, Assam. Its code is KTX. It serves Katakhal town. The station consists of two platforms.

== Major trains ==
- Dullavcherra–Badarpur Passenger
- Dullavcherra–Silchar Fast Passenger
- Maishashan–Silchar Passenger
- Silchar–Bhairabi Passenger
- Rangiya–Silchar Express
- Silchar–Dharmanagar Passenger
