= Pune–Nagpur Garib Rath Express =

Train in India

Nagpur-Pune Garib Rath Express

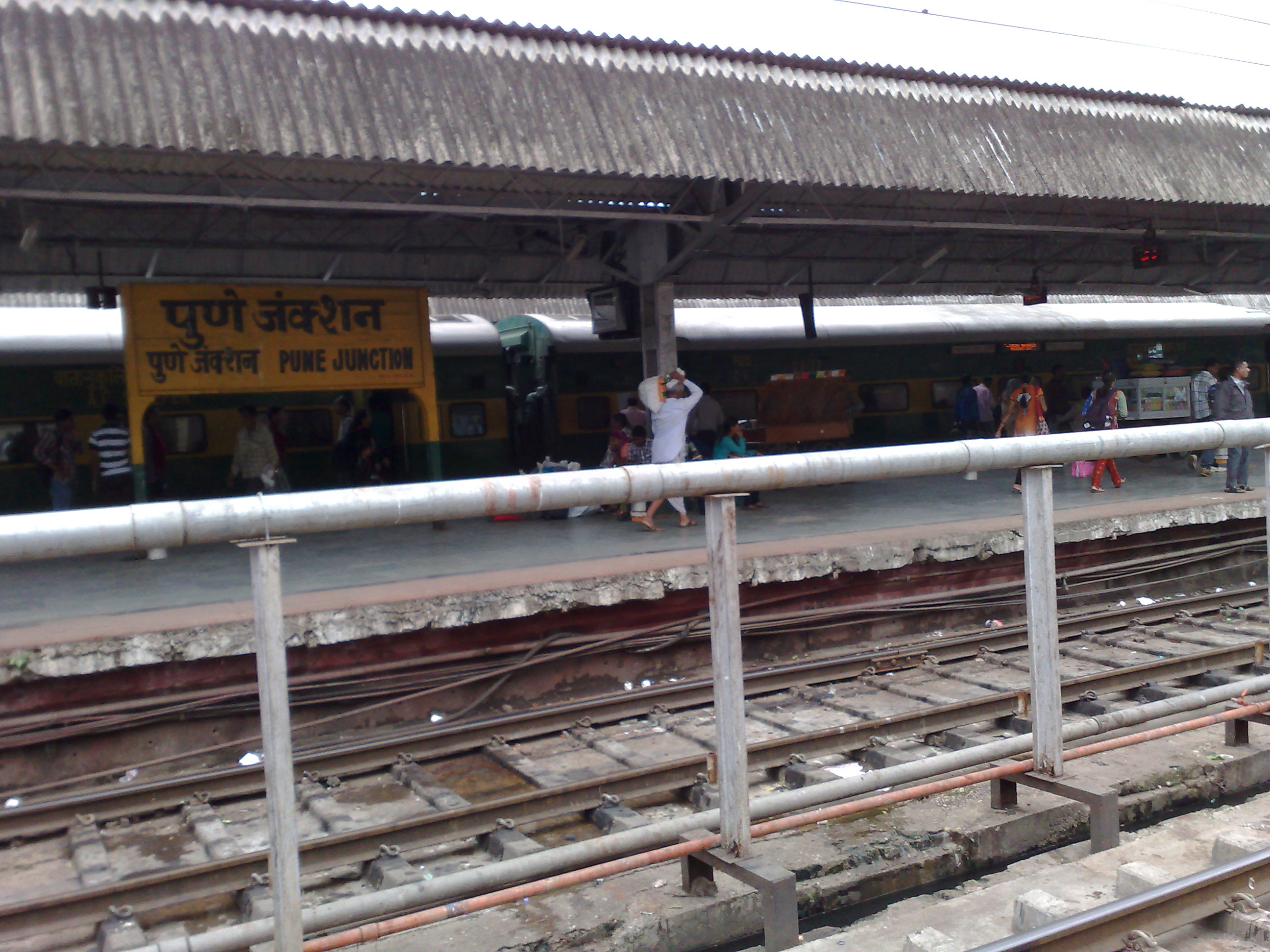

Overview
- Service type: Garib Rath Express
- Locale: Maharashtra
- First service: 19 January 2009; 17 years ago
- Current operator: Central Railway

Route
- Termini: Pune (PUNE); Nagpur (NGP)
- Stops: 9
- Distance travelled: 890 km (553 mi)
- Average journey time: 15 hours 45 minutes
- Service frequency: 3 days a week
- Train number: 12113 / 12114

On-board services
- Class: AC 3 tier Economy
- Seating arrangements: No
- Sleeping arrangements: Yes
- Catering facilities: On-board catering, E-catering
- Observation facilities: Large windows
- Baggage facilities: Available
- Other facilities: Below the seats

Technical
- Rolling stock: LHB coach
- Track gauge: 1,676 mm (5 ft 6 in)
- Operating speed: 58 km/h (36 mph) average including halts.
Route map
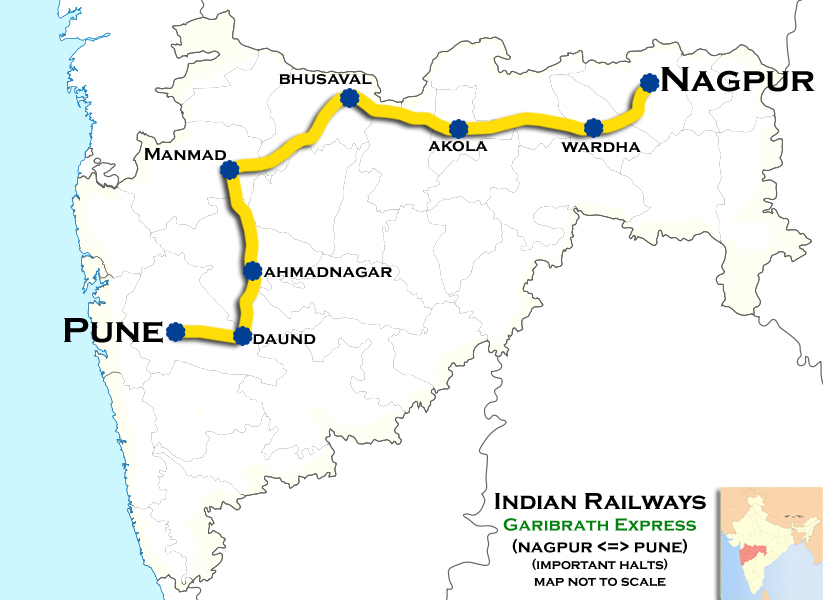

The 12113 / 12114 Nagpur-Pune Garib Rath Express is a Garib Rath class express train belonging to Indian Railways - Central Railway zone that runs between Nagpur Junction and Pune Junction three times per week. It operates as train number 12113 from Pune Junction to Nagpur Junction and as train number 12114 in the reverse direction.

== Coaches ==
The Nagpur Pune Garib Rath Express has LHB which 18 AC 3 tier Economy and 2 EoG cum SLR coaches. Unlike some Garib Rath trains, it does not have AC Chair Car coaches. The configuration and number of coaches are adjusted in response to demand on the line.

The Nagpur Pune Garib Rath Express used to run with ICF Garib Rath Coaches up until 24th June 2024, after which it was upgraded to LHB 3 AC Economy Coaches.

There is no pantry car but catering is arranged on board the train.

== Service ==
It is a premier train on the Nagpur Pune sector. Some of the other trains that join Nagpur & Pune are the 11039/40 Maharashtra Express, 12129/30 Azad Hind Express, and 12135/12136 Nagpur–Pune SF Express. It covers the distance of 890.4 kilometres in 15 hours 45 mins as 12113 Pune Nagpur Garib Rath Express (56.51 km/h) & 15 hours 10 mins as 12114 Nagpur Pune Garib Rath Express (58.68 km/h)

The Maximum Permissible Speed of this train is 130 km/h.

== Schedule ==
12113 Pune Nagpur Garib Rath Express leaves Pune Junction at 17:40 hrs IST and reaches the Nagpur Junction next day at 09:25 hrs IST . On return, the 12114 Nagpur Pune Garib Rath Express leaves Nagpur Junction at 18:35 hrs IST and reaches Pune Junction next day at 09:45 hrs IST.

== Traction ==
Earlier, the train with ICF coach was hauled between Pune Junction and Manmad Junction by a Pune based WDM-3A handing over to a Bhusaval based WAP-4 or Ajni based WAP-7 for the remainder of its journey.

With progressive electrification, it is now hauled by a Bhusaval based WAP-4 or Ajni based WAP-7 for its entire journey.

== Major stoppage ==
The train travels at a max speed of 130km/h and makes 14 stops en route.

1. Nagpur Junction
2. Ajni
3. Wardha Junction
4. Dhamangaon
5. Badnera Junction
6. Akola Junction
7. Shegaon
8. Malkapur
9. Nandura
10. Bhusaval Junction
11. Manmad Junction
12. Ahilyanagar
13. Daund Chord Line
14. Pune Junction

The train earlier used to reverses direction at Daund Junction. Now it bypasses it by Daund Chord Line.

== Gallery ==
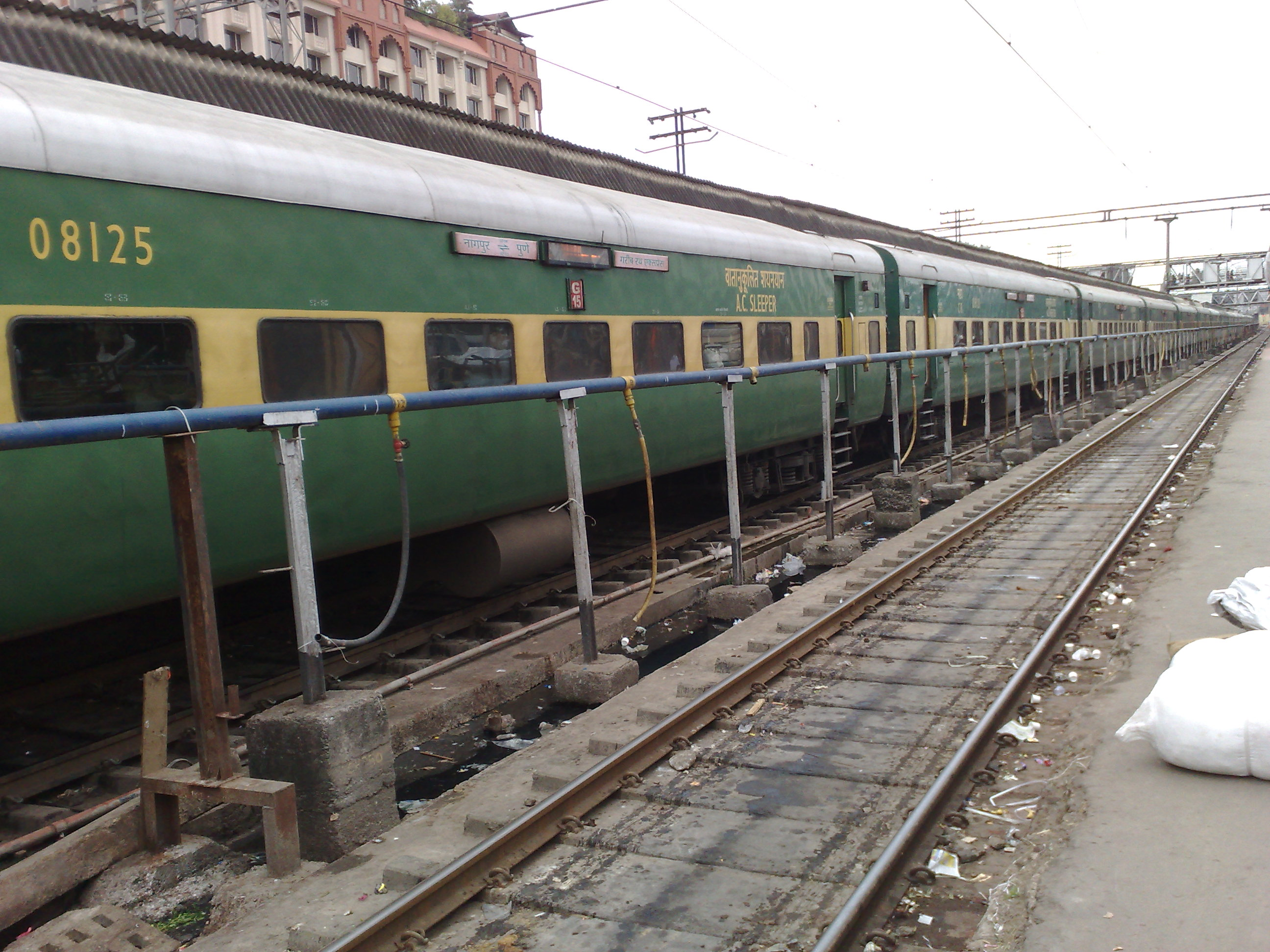
Pune Nagpur Garib Rath Express at Pune Junction platform

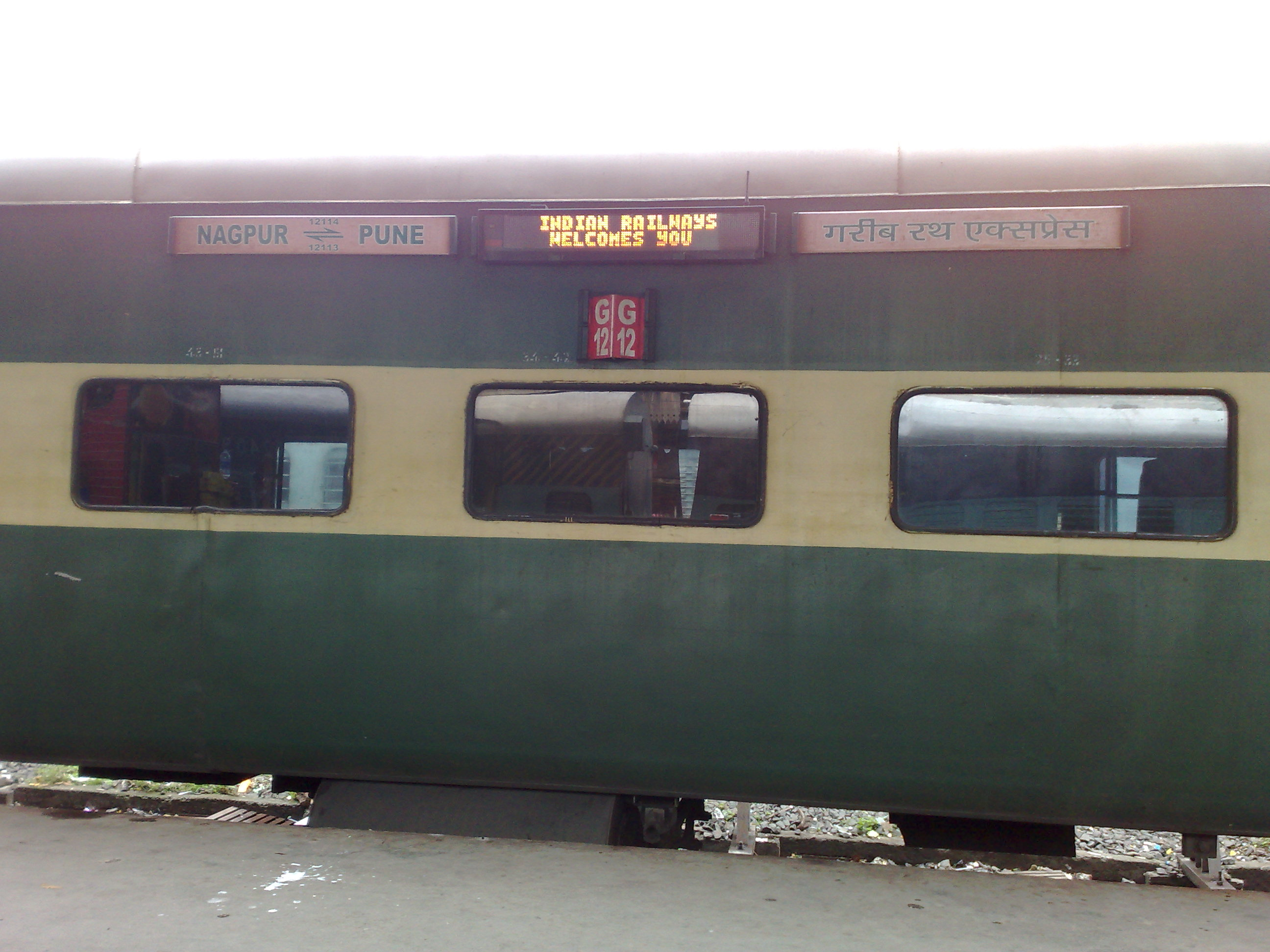
12113 Garib Rath Express AC 3 tier coach

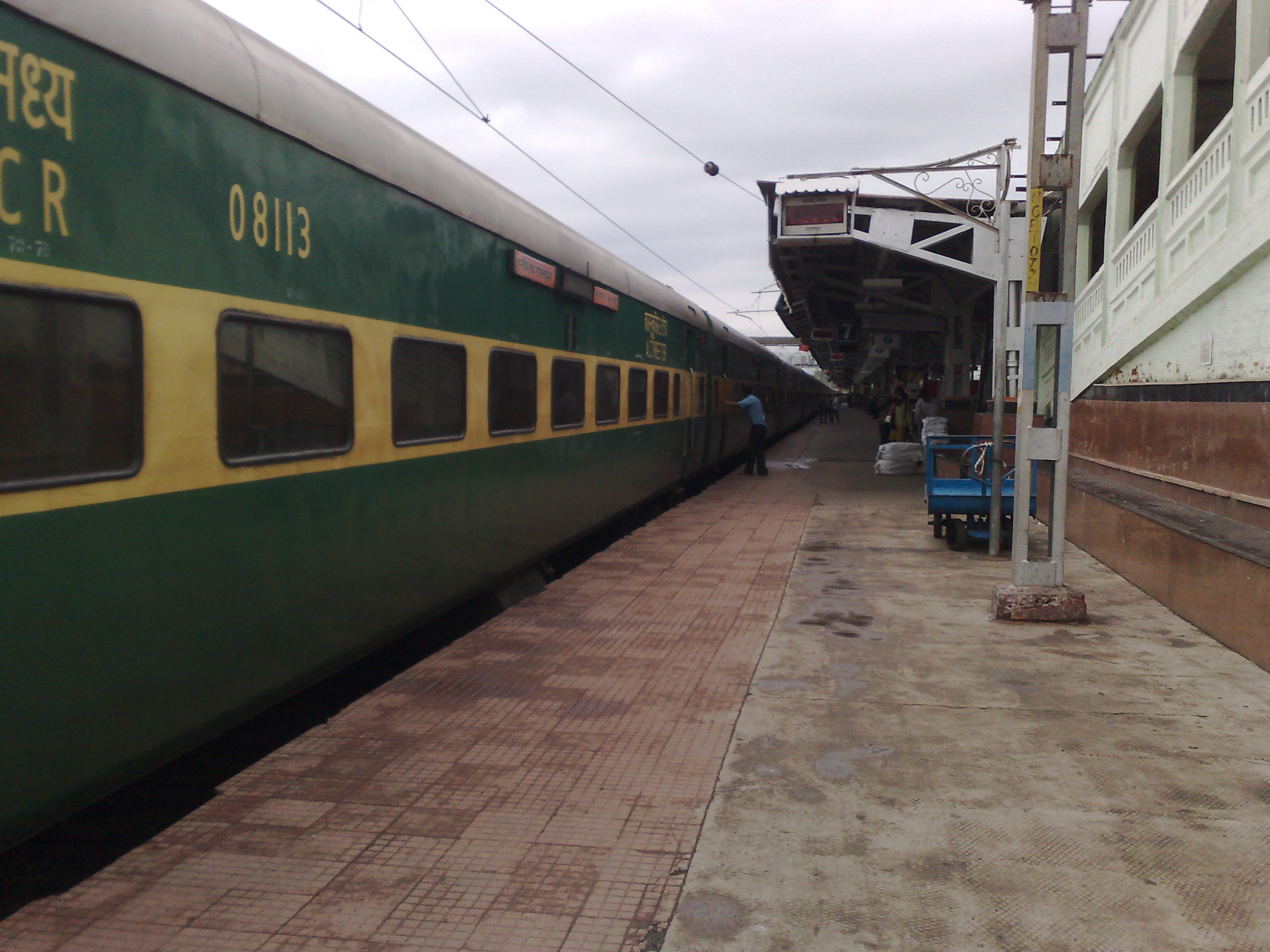
12113 Garib Rath Express at Nagpur Junction

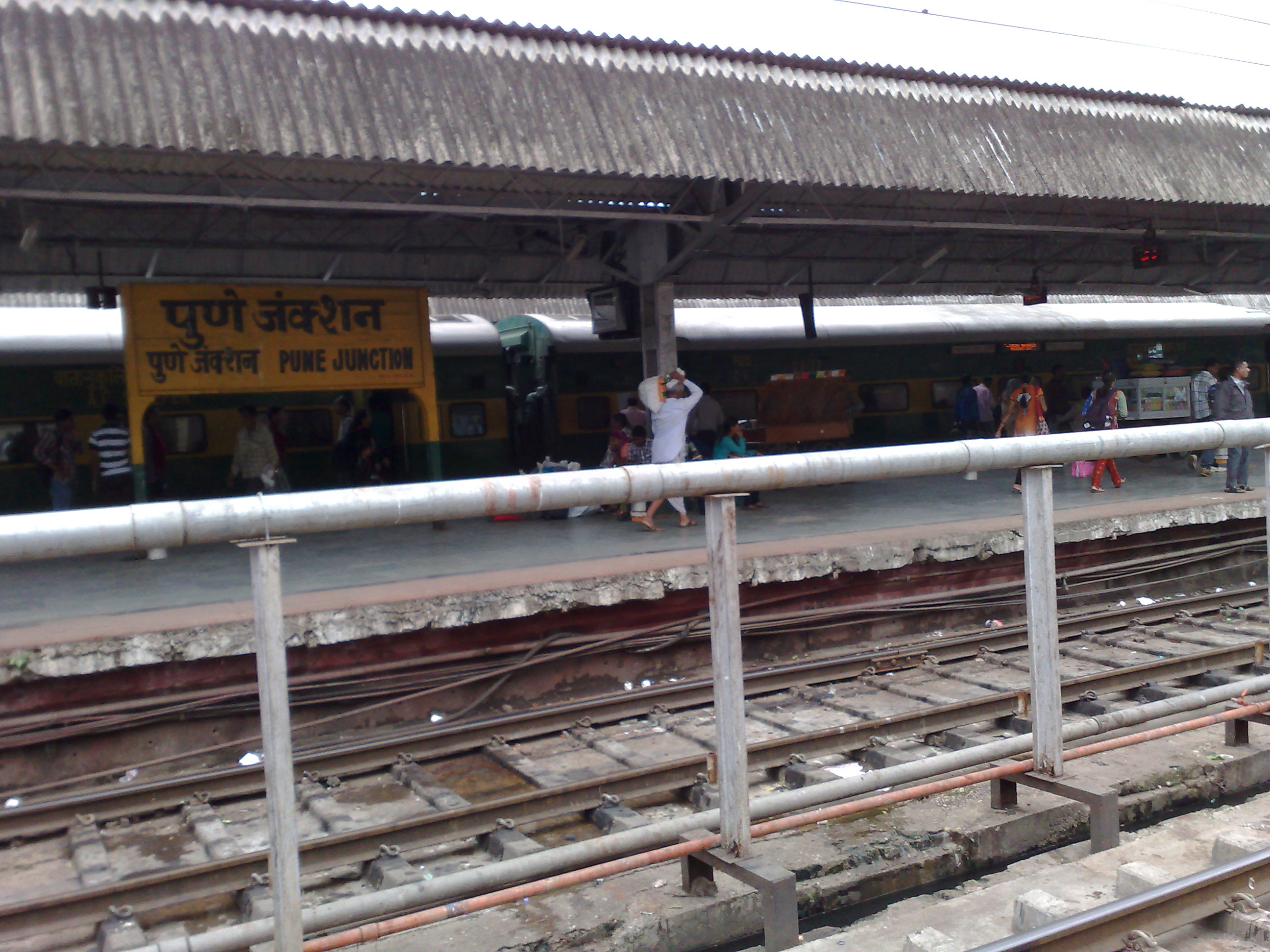
Pune Nagpur Garib Rath Express at Pune Junction
