= Visakhapatnam–Secunderabad AC Superfast Express =

Train in India

Secunderabad Jn – Visakhapatnam Jn AC Superfast Express

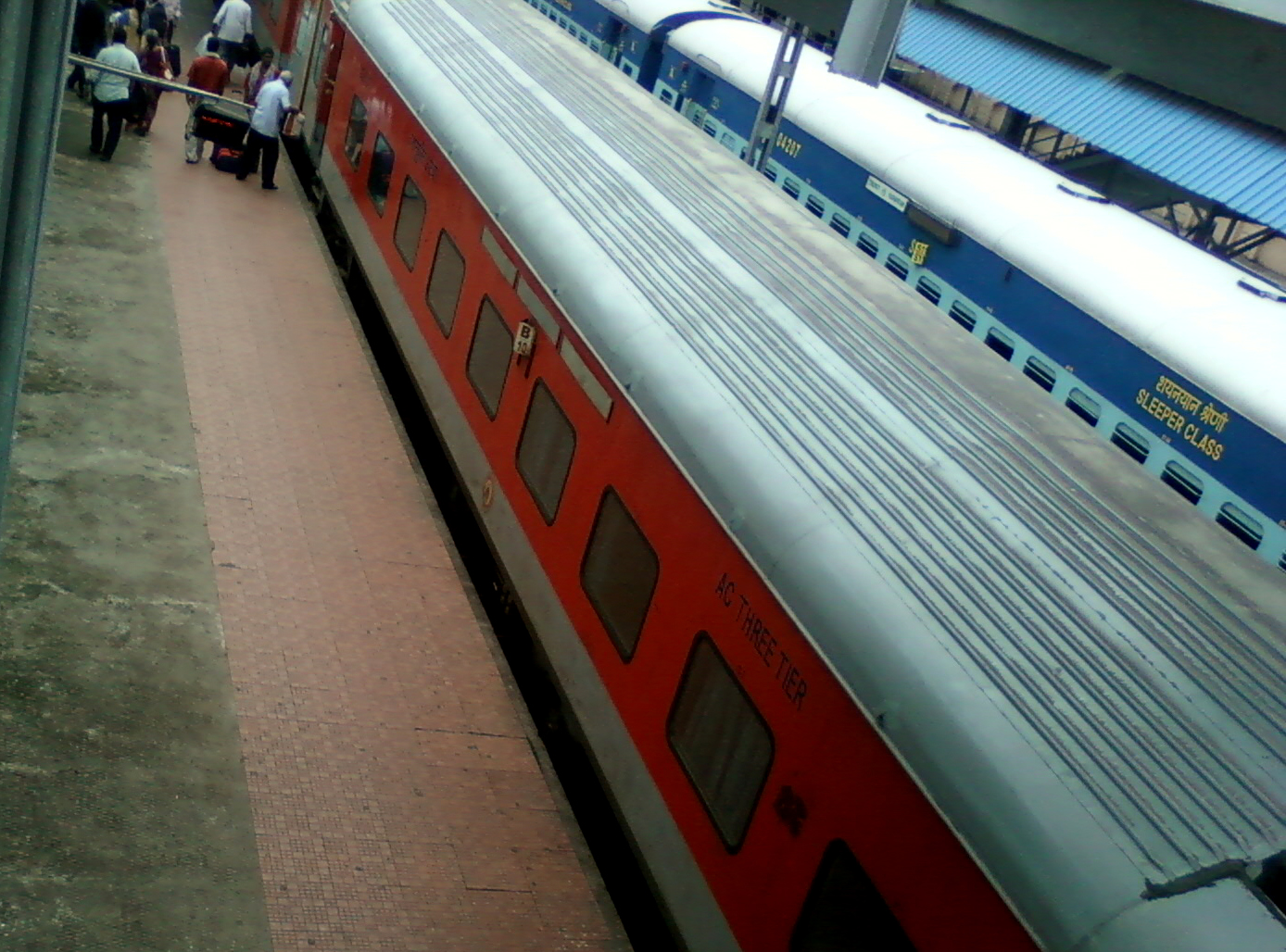
- Secunderabad - Visakhapatnam AC Express at Visakhapatnam Railway station

Overview
- Service type: AC Superfast
- First service: 19 January 2015
- Current operator: South Central Railway

Route
- Termini: Secunderabad Junction; Visakhapatnam Junction
- Stops: 10
- Distance travelled: 663 km (412 mi)
- Average journey time: 12 hours, 15 minutes
- Service frequency: Weekly
- Train number: 12783/12784

On-board services
- Classes: AC first class, AC two tier, AC three tier
- Sleeping arrangements: Berths are available and passengers are provided with pillows, towels, bedsheets and blankets
- Catering facilities: No pantry car attached, E-catering available
- Observation facilities: LHB coach with large windows in all classes
- Baggage facilities: Below the seats

Technical
- Rolling stock: 1
- Track gauge: Broad – 1,676 mm (5 ft 6 in)
- Operating speed: 55 km/h
Route map
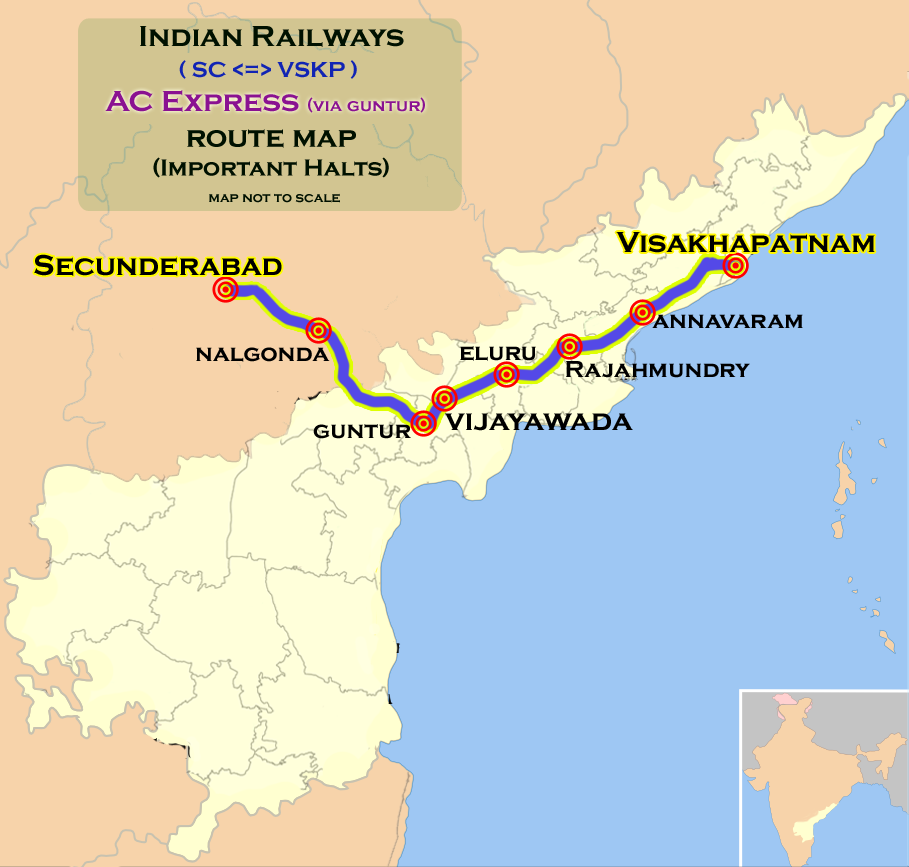

The Secunderabad–Visakhapatnam Express is a Superfast Express AC express train of the Indian Railways running between Secunderabad (SC) and Visakhapatnam (VSKP). It is handled by the South Central Railway (SCR). The train was announced in the 2014 Railway budget of India and it uses the rake of Secunderabad–Shalimar Express. The train stops at 13 stations en route, connecting major cities like Guntur, Vijayawada, Eluru and Rajahmundry. The train runs weekly and is the first LHB AC train to be introduced on this route. The train was flagged off from Secunderabad on at 11:15 am on 19 January 2015 by Minister of State of Railways Suresh Prabhu.

== Overview ==
Since the train is fully air-conditioned, it has no unreserved coaches. It has 11 third AC, three second AC and one first class coaches. Along with two generator cars, it has 17 coaches in total. The train has no pantry car and offers no catering. The up train departs Secunderabad every Saturday at 21:35 and arrives at Visakhapatnam every Sunday at 09:50. The down train departs Visakhapatnam every Sunday at 19:00 and arrives at Secunderabad every Monday at 07:40. The train runs with an average speed of 55 km/h (34 mph) and has no rake reversal at Vijayawada since it is diverted via Guntur.

== Technical ==
The train is equipped with LHB coach. They are considered to be "anti-telescopic", which means they do not get turned over, if the train derails or gets involved in a collision. These coaches are made of stainless steel and the interiors are made of aluminium which make them lighter as compared to conventional rakes. Each coach also has an "advanced pneumatic disc brake system" for efficient braking at higher speeds, "modular interiors" that integrate lighting into ceiling and luggage racks with wider windows. The improved suspension system of LHB coach ensures more riding comfort for the passengers compared to conventional rakes. The air conditioning system of the LHB coach is of higher capacity compared to the older rakes and is controlled by a microprocessor which is said to give passengers better comfort than the older coaches during summer and winter seasons. They are relatively quieter as each coach can produce a maximum noise level of 60 decibels while conventional coaches can produce 100 decibels. Each LHB coach costs between Rs 15 million to 20 million, whereas the power car which houses a generator costs about 30 million.

== Loco Link ==
The locomotive links for this train have not been fixed yet but often the train is hauled by a Lallaguda-based WAP-7 or WAP-4 locomotive between Secunderabad and Visakhapatnam. Recently this train is diverted via Guntur Junction

== See also ==
- Duronto Express – A series of point-to-point, non-stop AC/non-AC trains run in India.
- Visakhapatnam–Secunderabad Garib Rath Express
- Hyderabad–Visakhapatnam Godavari Express
- Visakha Express
