= Chennai Central–Hazrat Nizamuddin Garib Rath Express =

Train in India

MGR Chennai Central - Hazrat Nizamuddin Garib Rath Express

Overview
- Service type: Superfast Express, Garib Rath Express
- First service: 21 February 2007; 19 years ago
- Current operator: Southern Railway

Route
- Termini: MGR Chennai Central (MAS); Hazrat Nizamuddin (NZM)
- Stops: 9
- Distance travelled: 2,176 km (1,352 mi)
- Average journey time: 28 hours 10 minutes
- Service frequency: Weekly
- Train number: 12611 / 12612

On-board services
- Class: AC 3 tier Economy
- Seating arrangements: No
- Sleeping arrangements: Yes
- Catering facilities: On-board catering, E-catering
- Observation facilities: Large windows
- Baggage facilities: Available
- Other facilities: Below the seats

Technical
- Rolling stock: LHB coach
- Track gauge: 1,676 mm (5 ft 6 in)
- Operating speed: 130 km/h (81 mph) maximum,77.12 km/h (48 mph), including halts
Route map
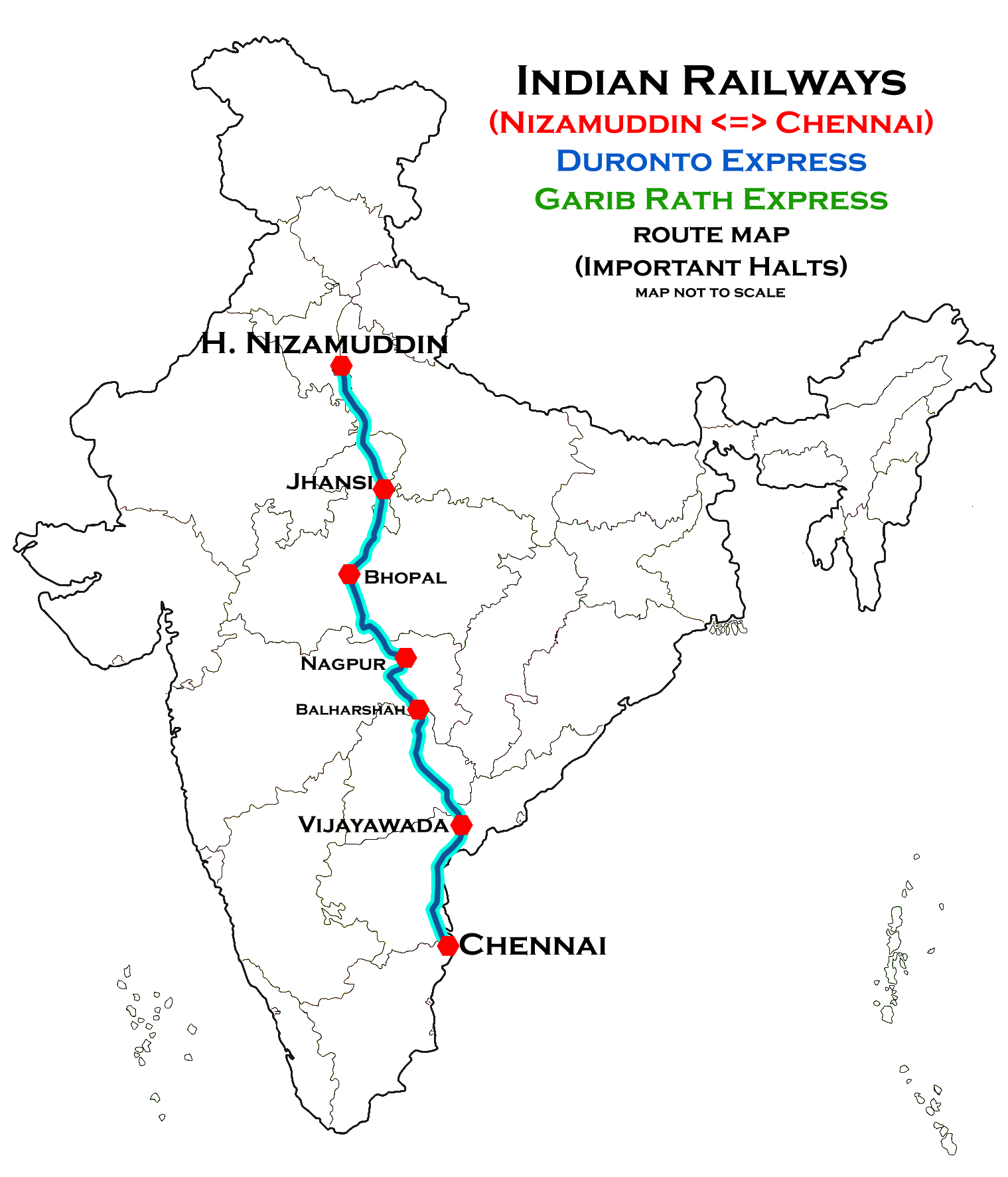

The 12611 / 12612 MGR Chennai Central-Hazrat Nizamuddin Garib Rath Express is a Superfast Express train of the Garib Rath category belonging to Indian Railways - Southern Railway zone that runs between Puratchi Thalaivar Dr. M.G. Ramachandran Central Railway Station and Hazrat Nizamuddin (New Delhi) in India.

It operates as train number 12611 from Puratchi Thalaivar Dr. M.G. Ramachandran Central Railway Station to Hazrat Nizamuddin and as train number 12612 in the reverse direction serving the seven states of Tamil Nadu, Andhra Pradesh, Telangana, Maharashtra, Madhya Pradesh, Uttar Pradesh & Delhi. It shares the record of being the fastest train between Hazrat Nizamuddin and Puratchi Thalaivar Dr. M.G. Ramachandran Central Railway Station along with the Chennai Rajdhani Express covering the 2176 km journey in 28 hours and 20 minutes.

== Coaches ==
The 12611 / 12612 MGR Chennai Central-Hazrat Nizamuddin Garib Rath Express has an LHB rake earlier was ICF rakes since ICF Garib Rath rakes cancelled in 2024 now LHB rakes consisting of 14 AC 3-tier economy and 2 End-on Generator coaches. It does not carry a Pantry car coach.

As is customary with most train services in India, Coach Composition may be amended at the discretion of Indian Railways, depending on demand.

== Services ==
The 12611 numbered Puratchi Thalaivar Dr. M.G. Ramachandran Central Railway Station - Hazrat Nizamuddin Garib Rath Express covers a distance of 2175 kilometres in 28 hours 10 mins (77.22 km/h).

The 12612 numbered Hazrat Nizamuddin - Puratchi Thalaivar Dr. M.G. Ramachandran Central Railway Station Garib Rath Express covers a distance of 2176 kilometres in 28 hours 15 mins (77.03 km/h).

As the train's average speed is above 55 km/h (34 mph), as per Indian Railways rules, its fare includes a Superfast surcharge.

== Routes ==
The routes of 12611 / 12 numbered Puratchi Thalaivar Dr. M.G. Ramachandran Central Railway Station - Hazrat Nizamuddin Garib Rath Express are:

- Puratchi Thalaivar Dr. M.G. Ramachandran Central Railway Station
- Gudur
- Ongole
- Vijayawada Junction
- Nagpur
- Bhopal Junction
- Jhansi Junction
- Agra Cantt
- Hazrat Nizamuddin.

== Traction ==
earlier was WAP-4. It is hauled by a Royapuram Loco Shed-based WAP-7 electric locomotive on its entire journey.

== Coach position ==
12611 Puratchi Thalaivar Dr. M.G. Ramachandran Central Railway Station - Hazrat Nizamuddin Garib Rath Express
	GD2	G14	G13	G12	G11	G10	G9	G8	G7	G6	G5	G4	G3	G2	G1	GD1
Locomotive	3A	3A	3A	3A	3A	3A	3A	3A	3A	3A	3A	3A	3A	3A	3A	3A
0	1	2	3	4	5	6	7	8	9	10	11	12	13	14	15	16

12612 Hazrat Nizamuddin - Puratchi Thalaivar Dr. M.G. Ramachandran Central Railway Station Garib Rath Express
	GD1	G1	G2	G3	G4	G5	G6	G7	G8	G9	G10	G11	G12	G13	G14	GD2
Locomtoive	3A	3A	3A	3A	3A	3A	3A	3A	3A	3A	3A	3A	3A	3A	3A	3A
0	1	2	3	4	5	6	7	8	9	10	11	12	13	14	15	16

== Timings ==
12611 Puratchi Thalaivar Dr. M.G. Ramachandran Central Railway Station - Hazrat Nizamuddin Garib Rath Express leaves Puratchi Thalaivar Dr. M.G. Ramachandran Central Railway Station every Saturday at 06:10 hrs IST and reaches Hazrat Nizamuddin at 10:20 hrs IST the next day.

Puratchi Thalaivar Dr. M.G. Ramachandran Central Railway Station to Hazrat Nizamuddin
#	Code	Stn Name	Zone	Div.	Arr.	Dep.	Halt	PF	Dist.	Day
1	MAS	Puratchi Thalaivar Dr. M.G. Ramachandran Central Railway Station	SR	MAS	First	06.05	0	1	0	1
2	GDR	Gudur Jn (PQ)	SCR	BZA	07.49	07.50	1	2	138	1
3	OGL	Ongole	SCR	BZA	09.38	09.40	2	1	292	1
4	BZA	Vijayawada Jn	SCR	BZA	11.50	11.55	5	6	431	1
5	BPQ	Balharshah	CR	NGP	17.50	18.00	10	2	880	1
6	NGP	Nagpur (RL)	CR	NGP	20.40	20.45	5	1	1091	1
7	BPL	Bhopal Jn	WCR	BPL	02.00	02.10	10	2	1487	2
8	JHS	Jhansi Jn	NCR	JHS	05.26	05.31	5	4	1778	2
9	GWL	Gwalior Jn	NCR	JHS	06.30	06.32	2	4	1875	2
10	AGC	Agra Cantt	NCR	AGRA	07.55	07.57	2	2	1993	2
11	NZM	Hazrat Nizamuddin	NR	DLI	10.25	Last	0	4	2180	2

12612 Hazrat Nizamuddin - Puratchi Thalaivar Dr. M.G. Ramachandran Central Railway Station Garib Rath Express leaves Hazrat Nizamuddin every Monday at 15:55 hrs IST and reaches Puratchi Thalaivar Dr. M. G. Ramachandran Central Railway Station at 20:15 hrs IST the next day.

Hazrat Nizamuddin to Puratchi Thalaivar Dr. M.G. Ramachandran Central Railway Station
#	Code	Stn Name	Zone	Div.	Arr.	Dep.	Halt	PF	Dist.	Day
1	NZM	Hazrat Nizamuddin	NR	DLI	First	15.55	0	7	0	1
2	AGC	Agra Cantt	NCR	AGRA	18.00	18.02	2	1	188	1
3	GWL	Gwalior Jn (RL)	NCR	JHS	19.23	19.25	2	1	306	1
4	JHS	Jhansi Jn (RL)	NCR	JHS	20.38	20.43	5	1	403	1
5	BPL	Bhopal Jn (RL)	WCR	BPL	23.55	00.05	10	1	694	2
6	NGP	Nagpur (RL)	CR	NGP	05.25	05.35	10	2	1083	2
7	BPQ	Balharshah (RL)	CR	NGP	08.10	08.20	10	2	1294	2
8	BZA	Vijayawada Jn (RL)	SCR	BZA	14.15	14.30	15	5	1746	2
9	OGL	Ongole	SCR	BZA	16.17	16.19	2	3	1885	2
10	GDR	Gudur Jn	SCR	BZA	18.24	18.25	1	1	2039	2
11	MAS	Puratchi Thalaivar Dr. M.G. Ramachandran Central Railway Station	SR	MAS	20.40	Last	0	6	2176	2
