= Maishashan–Silchar Passenger =

Passenger train in India

Maishashan Silchar Passenger
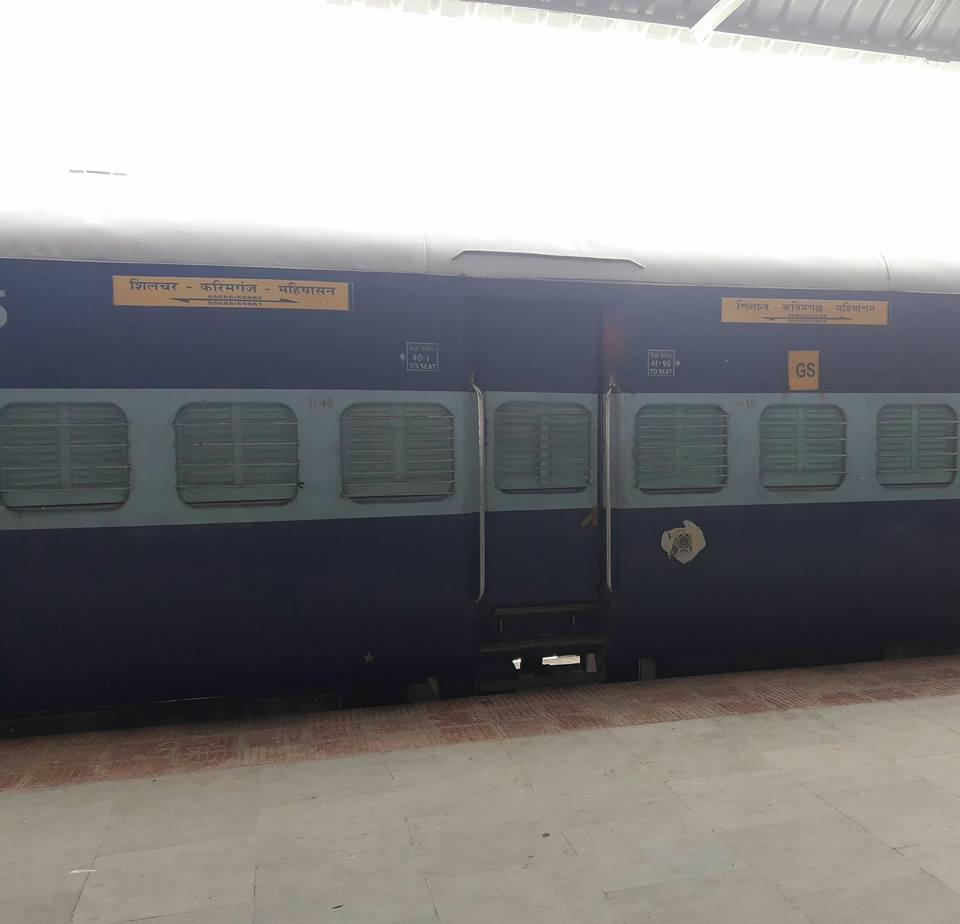
- Maishashan Passenger at Karimganj Junction

Overview
- Service type: Passenger
- Locale: Assam
- First service: Thu 10 Nov 2016
- Current operator: Northeast Frontier Railways
- Ridership: 585 approx.

Route
- Termini: Maishashan; Silchar
- Stops: 11
- Distance travelled: 60 km (37 mi)
- Average journey time: 2 hours 45 minutes
- Service frequency: 6 Days; except Sunday
- Train numbers: 05683 UP; 05684 DOWN

On-board services
- Classes: General (6); SLR (1)
- Seating arrangements: Available
- Sleeping arrangements: Not Available
- Auto-rack arrangements: Not Available
- Catering facilities: ✕ Pantry Car ✕ On-board Catering ✕ E-Catering
- Observation facilities: Windows
- Baggage facilities: under Seat; upper racks

Technical
- Rolling stock: ICF rakes
- Track gauge: BG
- Electrification: Not Available
- Operating speed: Avg Speed: 22 km/h (14 mph)

Maishashan Silchar Passenger is a passenger train belonging to Northeast Frontier Railway zone of Indian Railways that connects the border town and the second largest city of Assam, that is, Maishashan and Silchar. The train runs two times each from Maishashan and Silchar, every day. The train makes its main halt at Karimganj Junction for 10 mins. The train runs with WDP-4

== Service ==
Frequency of this train is 6 days, except Sunday and it covers the distance of 60 km (37 mi) with an average speed of 22 km/h (14 mph) on both sides.

== Major Halts ==
- Maishashan; Start
- Karimganj Junction
- Badarpur Junction
- Katakhal Junction
- Arunachal Junction
- Silchar; End
