= Garib Rath Express =

Series of lower-cost express trains in India

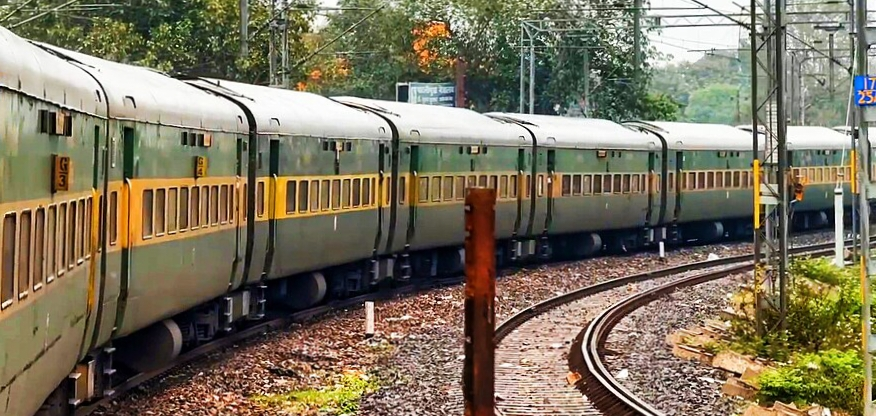
- Amritsar–Saharsa the first Garib Rath Express at Barauni Junction

Overview
- Service type: Express
- Status: Operating
- Locale: All over India
- First service: 5 October 2006; 20 years ago
- Current operator: Indian Railways

Technical
- Rolling stock: LHB
- Track gauge: 5 ft 6 in (1,676 mm) broad gauge
- Operating speed: 130 Kmph
- Track owner: Indian Railways

The Garib Rath (lit. Poor's Chariot) trains are a series of no-frills trains operated by Indian Railways to provide air-conditioned train travel at a cheaper rate compared to regular trains. Garib Rath Express trains primarily operate on long-distance routes, connecting major cities and important railway stations across different states in India. These trains are designed to cover extensive distances, often traversing several hundred kilometers in a single journey.

== History ==
The Sanskrit term "Garib Rath" translates to "Poor Man's Chariot" or "Chariot of the Poor" in English. These trains were primarily aimed at providing affordable transportation for economically weaker sections of society. The first service was inaugurated on 5 October 2006 by introduced by the then Rail Minister of India Lalu Prasad Yadav between Saharsa and Amritsar.

== Rolling stock ==
Garib Rath trains have fully air-conditioned coaches that have to be reserved in advance. The originally used ICF rakes, which have been removed from service, consisted of modified AC 3-Tier coaches with side middle berths. The new LHB rakes consist of AC 3-Tier Economy coaches without side middle berths. Earlier some Garib Rath Express trains were pulled by diesel locomotives such as the WDM-3A, WDM-3D and WDP-4 or WDG-4, and nowadays with the LHB coach upgrade and the route being fully electrified those are pulled by electric locomotives like the WAP-4, WAP-5 and most importantly the WAP-7.

Train no.	Destinations	Inaugurated on	Distance (km)	Journey time	Major halts
12203/04	Saharsa Junction–Amritsar Junction	5 Oct 2006	~1550	~30 hrs	Barauni, Patna, Varanasi, Lucknow, Delhi
12611/12	Chennai Central–Hazrat Nizamuddin	21 Feb 2007	~2180	~33 hrs	Vijayawada, Nagpur, Bhopal, Jhansi
12909/10	Bandra Terminus–Hazrat Nizamuddin	24 Feb 2007	~1385	~16 hrs	Surat, Vadodara, Ratlam, Kota
13127/28	Kolkata - Ara	24 Jan 2008	~600	~10 hrs	Asansol, Jasidih, Jamui
12201/02	Lokmanya Tilak Terminus–Thiruvananthapuram Kochuveli	31 Jan 2008	~1500	~28 hrs	Madgaon, Mangalore, Ernakulam
12735/36	Secunderabad Junction–Yesvantpur Junction	1 Feb 2008	~700	~12 hrs	Kurnool, Dharmavaram, Hindupur
12215/16	Delhi Sarai Rohilla–Bandra Terminus	7 Feb 2008	~1360	~17 hrs	Jaipur, Ajmer, Ahmedabad
12535/36	Lucknow Charbagh–Raipur Junction	23 Feb 2008	~820	~15 hrs	Prayagraj, Satna, Bilaspur
12517/18	Kolkata - Guwahati	30 Mar 2008	~1000	~18 hrs	Malda Town, New Jalpaiguri, New Bongaigaon
12207/08	Kathgodam–Jammu Tawi	8 Apr 2008	~900	~16 hrs	Moradabad, Saharanpur, Pathankot
12209/10	Kanpur Central – Kathgodam	16 Sep 2008	~450	~8 hrs	Lucknow, Bareilly, Lal Kuan
12435/36	Jaynagar–Anand Vihar Terminal	29 Sep 2008	~1250	~22 hrs	Darbhanga, Samastipur, Patna
12739/40	Visakhapatnam–Secunderabad	25 Oct 2008	~700	~12 hrs	Rajahmundry, Vijayawada
12881/82	Puri - Shalimar	6 Jan 2009	~500	~9 hrs	Bhubaneswar, Cuttack, Kharagpur
12113/14	Pune–Nagpur	19 Jan 2009	~890	~15 hrs	Daund, Manmad, Bhusaval
12877/78	Ranchi – New Delhi	28 Jan 2009	~1300	~20 hrs	Bokaro, Gaya, Pt. Deen Dayal Upadhyay
12211/12	Muzaffarpur – Anand Vihar Terminal	11 Feb 2009	~1050	~20 hrs	Hajipur, Chhapra, Ballia
12983/84	Ajmer Junction – Chandigarh	14 Feb 2009	~800	~14 hrs	Jaipur, Delhi
12187/88	Jabalpur Junction–Mumbai CSMT	20 Feb 2009	~1000	~18 hrs	Itarsi, Bhusaval, Kalyan
12257/58	Yesvantpur Junction–Thiruvananthapuram Kochuveli	24 Feb 2009	~730	~14 hrs	Palakkad, Coimbatore, Salem
22541/52	Banaras–Anand Vihar Terminal	3 Mar 2009	~800	~14 hrs	Prayagraj, Kanpur
22405/06	Bhagalpur Junction–Anand Vihar Terminal	10 Feb 2011	~1200	~22 hrs	Jamalpur, Kiul, Patna
22409/10	Gaya Junction–Anand Vihar Terminal	3 July 2011	~1000	~18 hrs	Dehri-on-Sone, Pt. Deen Dayal Upadhyay
12593/94	Lucknow Charbagh–Bhopal Junction	19 Nov 2011	~700	~12 hrs	Kanpur, Jhansi
22883/84	Puri–Yesvantpur Junction	20 July 2012	~1500	~26 hrs	Visakhapatnam, Vijayawada, Renigunta
12501/02	Kolkata - Agartala	5 July 2024	~1600	~32 hrs	Malda Town, Guwahati, Lumding

== Defunct routes ==
- 12255/56 Yesvantpur–Puducherry Garib Rath Express service converted to ordinary service
- 02709 Gudur-Secunderabad Garibrath Express special Rake Sharing With Secunderabad Yesvantpur Garibrath Express
- 0655/0656 Chennai CST Garibrath special & Chennai Central Tirunelveli Garibrath Special Rake Sharing With Chennai–Hazrat Nizamuddin Garibrath Express.
- 06511/06512 Jaipur - Yesvantpur Garibrath Express is now replaced by Superfast Express on same route.

== See also ==
- Mumbai–Ahmedabad high-speed rail corridor
- Vande Bharat Express
- Double Decker Express
- Duronto Express
- Vivek Express
- Yuva Express
- Rajdhani Express
- Shatabdi Express
- Gatimaan Express
- Jan Shatabdi Express
- Jan Sadharan Express
- Sampark Kranti Express
- Rajya Rani Express
- Kavi Guru Express
- Ramayana Express
- Tejas Express
- Uday Express
- Humsafar Express
- Mahamana Express
- Antyodaya Express
