= Kolkata–Guwahati Garib Rath Express =

Train service in India

Kolkata – Guwahati Garib Rath Express
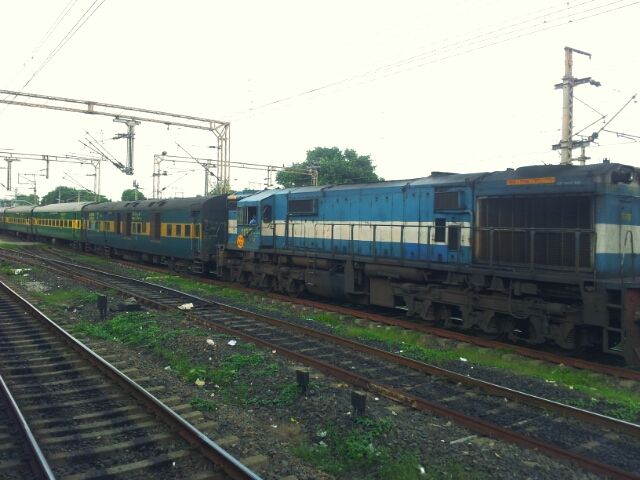

Overview
- Service type: Garib Rath Express
- Status: Active
- Locale: Assam, Bihar and West Bengal
- First service: 29 March 2008; 18 years ago
- Current operator: Northeast Frontier Railway

Route
- Termini: Kolkata (KOAA); Guwahati (GHY)
- Stops: 13
- Distance travelled: 1027 km
- Service frequency: Weekly (Note: Runs once in a week for every direction.)
- Train number: 12517/12518

On-board services
- Class: AC 3 Tier Economy (3E)
- Seating arrangements: Available
- Sleeping arrangements: Available
- Catering facilities: Available
- Observation facilities: Large windows
- Baggage facilities: Below the seats

Technical
- Rolling stock: Linke-Hofmann-Busch (LHB) coach
- Track gauge: 1,676 mm (5 ft 6 in)
- Operating speed: 110 km/h (68 mph)

The 12517 / 12518 Kolkata - Guwahati Garib Rath Express is a Garib Rath class train of Indian Railways, which connects the state capital of West Bengal, Kolkata to the state capital of Assam, Guwahati. The train is operated by the North East Frontier Railway Zone (NFR) of the Indian Railways.

== A brief history ==
This train service was inaugurated on March 29, 2008. During the COVID-19 pandemic, all the train services throughout India was cancelled, including this one. However, after the resumption of the train services post pandemic, this train was not resumed. Instead, it was being run as an air-conditioned special train with Linke-Hoffman Busch coaches. This service was scrapped and re-introduced again and again due to its poor patronage. Finally, on 21 June 2024, the North East Frontier Railway Zone informed the public that the Kolkata - Guwahati Garib Rath Express would be restored from July onwards, practically regularising the special train. The first service commenced on 6 July 2024.

== Service ==
- The 12517 Kolkata - Guwahati Garib Rath Express leaves Kolkata at 21:45 hrs every Thursday and reaches Guwahati the next day at 15:55 hrs. It covers the journey in 18 hours 10 minutes averaging at 55 km/h (34 mph).
- The 12518 Guwahati – Kolkata Garib Rath Express leaves Guwahati at 21:00 hrs every Saturday and reaches Kolkata the next day at 14:30 hrs. It covers the journey in 17 hours 30 minutes averaging at 57 km/h (35 mph).

== Coach composition ==
This train runs with 22 Linke-Hoffman Busch Third AC economy (3E) coaches. (Note: Usually the "M" notation is used to represent this class, but in Garib Rath trains, it is represented by the "G" notation)It has a single rake, which it shares with the Kolkata - Agartala Garib Rath Express. The primary maintenance is executed at Agartala and the secondary maintenance at Guwahati.

Legends
EOG/SLR	PC	MIL	H	A	HA	B	AB	G	K	E	C	S	D	GEN/UR
Generator cum luggage van	Pantry car or Hot buffet car	Military coach	First AC (1A)	Second AC (2A)	First AC cum Second AC	Third AC (3A)	Third AC cum Second AC	Third AC economy (3E)	Anubhuti coach (K)	Executive chair car (EC)	AC Chair car (CC)	Sleeper class (SL)	Second seating (2S)	General or Unreserved
	Loco and other service coach													
	AC coach													
	Non-AC coach													

Coach Position of 12517 (ex. Kolkata)

Loco	1	2	3	4	5	6	7	8	9	10	11	12	13	14	15	16	17	18	19	20	21	22
	EOG	G20	G19	G18	G17	G16	G15	G14	G13	G12	G11	G10	G9	G8	G7	G6	G5	G4	G3	G2	G1	EOG

Coach Position of 12518 (ex. Guwahati)

Loco	1	2	3	4	5	6	7	8	9	10	11	12	13	14	15	16	17	18	19	20	21	22
	EOG	G1	G2	G3	G4	G5	G6	G7	G8	G9	G10	G11	G12	G13	G14	G15	G16	G17	G18	G19	G20	EOG

Passengers are advised to check the coach position indicators at the station before boarding.

== Traction ==
The train is hauled by a Howrah based WAP-4 or a Sealdah based WAP-7 electric locomotive till New Cooch Behar station. From there, it is hauled by a Siliguri based WDP-4 or a WDP-4D diesel locomotive to its destination.

== Route and halts ==
The stoppages are:-

- Kolkata
- Bandel Junction
- Nabadwip Dham
- Katwa Junction
- Azimganj Junction
- Jangipur Road
- Malda Town
- Kishanganj
- New Jalpaiguri Junction
- New Cooch Behar
- New Alipurduar
- Kokrajhar
- New Bongaigaon Junction
- Goalpara Town
- Guwahati

== Other trains on the Kolkata–New Jalpaiguri sector ==
- 22301/02 Howrah–New Jalpaiguri Vande Bharat Express
- 12041/42 New Jalpaiguri–Howrah Shatabdi Express
- 12377/78 Padatik Express
- 12343/44 Darjeeling Mail
- 15959/60 Kamrup Express (via Guwahati)
- 15961/62 Kamrup Express (via Bogibeel)
- 13173/74 Sealdah–Agartala Kanchanjunga Express
- 13175/76 Sealdah–Silchar Kanchanjunga Express
- 12345/46 Saraighat Express
- 15721/22 New Jalpaiguri-Digha Express
- 13141/42 Teesta Torsha Express
- 13147/48 Uttar Banga Express
- 13181/82 Kolkata–Silghat Town Kaziranga Express
- 22511/12 Lokmanya Tilak Terminus–Kamakhya Karmabhoomi Express
- 15643/44 Puri–Kamakhya Weekly Express (via Howrah)
- 12363/64 Kolkata–Haldibari Intercity Express
- 13115/16 Sealdah - Jalpaiguri Road Humsafar Express

== See also ==
- Garib Rath Express
- Kolkata - Agartala Garib Rath Express
