= Ratabari railway station =

Railway station in Assam

Ratabari

General information
- Location: Ratabari, Karimganj district, Assam; India
- Coordinates: 24.5708°N 92.4092°E
- Elevation: 20 metres (66 ft)
- System: Indian Railways station
- Owner: Indian Railways
- Operator: Northeast Frontier Railway
- Line: Lumding–Sabroom section
- Platforms: 1
- Tracks: 4
- Connections: Auto stand

Construction
- Structure type: Standard (on ground station)
- Parking: No
- Cycle facilities: No

Other information
- Status: Single diesel line
- Station code: RTBR
- Zone(s): Northeast Frontier Railway
- Division(s): Lumding
Location
- Location within Assam Location within India

Ratabari Railway Station is a small railway station in Karimganj district, Assam. Its code is RTBR. It serves Ratabari town. The station consists of a single platform.

== Major trains ==
- Dullavcherra–Badarpur Passenger
- Dullavcherra–Silchar Fast Passenger
