= Barak Valley Express =

- In service: Mail/Express cum Passenger Train
- Entered service: 1914-2014
- Scrapped: September 2014
- Successor: 15611/15612 Rangiya-Silchar Express
- Lines served: Lumding - Silchar Meter Gauge Line

Specifications
- Train length: 11 Coaches
- Maximum speed: 18 kilometres per hour (11 mph) average with halts
- Prime mover(s): YDM-4 of Lumding shed.
- Track gauge: 1,000 mm (3 ft 3 3/8 in) metre gauge

Notes/references
- Termini: Lumding & Silchar

Barak Valley Express (numbers 15693/15694) was a daily mail/express train that used to connect Silchar, a town in the south of Assam, to Lumding Jn, in Northeast India. The name of train is featured in the opening scene of 1998 Bollywood movie Dil Se. Though it was a mail/express type train, due to its timings and stops from 1992-2014, it was also considered a passenger train.

== History ==
Originally, the train ran between Guwahati (capital of the state Assam) and Silchar when introduced in 1914 by the British. The British introduced 6 important trains after the Lumding-Badarpur Junction MG line was completed in 1914. These were 2 MG trains between Guwahati and Silchar, 1 MG train between Silchar & Sylhet, 1 MG Train between Silchar & Dhaka, 1 MG Train between Dhaka & Hailakandi & 1 between Guwahati & Dhaka. In 1947 after partition, 4 trains were permanently withdrawn with only 2 MG trains between Guwahati and Silchar running until 1992. This train was the second option for the passengers, who were willing to travel by train between Silchar and Guwahati, as it was an overnight train. But it became a day train after conversion of Guwahati–Lumding to broad gauge in 1992, the originating and ending station of these train was changed to Lumding. Before 1992 the train used to cover 393 kilometres (244 mi) distance in 17 hrs 30 mins with an average moving speed of 22.50 kilometres per hour (13.98 mph).

Post 1992, 15693 Barak Valley Express used to cover a distance of 213 kilometres (132 mi) in 12 hours 30 in its up and down journey with an average moving speed of 17 kilometres per hour (11 mph) stopping at Langting, Maibang, Lower Haflong, Haflong Hill, Old Harangajao, Jatinga, Chandranathpur, Badarpur Junction, Katakhal Junction and Arunachal Junction.

== Cancellation & Permanent Withdrawal ==
The train was cancelled in September 2014 due to gauge conversion in the North Cachhar Hills section of North East Frontier Railway, part of Indian Railways.
