= Dullabcherra railway station =

Railway station in Assam

Dullabcherra

General information
- Location: Anipur Nivia Road, Dullabcherra, Karimganj district, Assam; India
- Coordinates: 24.488°N 92.433°E
- Elevation: 26 metres (85 ft)
- System: Indian Railways station
- Owner: Indian Railways
- Operator: Northeast Frontier Railway
- Line: Lumding–Sabroom section
- Platforms: 1
- Tracks: 4
- Connections: Auto stand

Construction
- Structure type: Standard (on ground station)
- Parking: No
- Cycle facilities: No

Other information
- Status: Active
- Station code: DLCR
- Zone(s): Northeast Frontier Railway
- Division(s): Lumding
Location
- Location within Assam Location within India

Dullabcherra Railway Station is a railway station in Karimganj district, Assam. Its code is DLCR. It serves Dullabcherra town. The station consists of a single platform. It is the terminal station in Baraigram Jn - Dullabchera spur line of Lumding–Sabroom section and is the last railway line under Northeast Frontier Railway zone to complete gauge conversion.

The station is currently served with three pair of train services which connect it with Silchar and Guwahati via Karimganj and Badarpur Junction

== Major trains ==
- Guwahati–Dullabcherra Express
- Dullavcherra–Badarpur Passenger
- Dullavcherra–Silchar Fast Passenger
