= Secunderabad–Yesvantpur Garib Rath Express =

Train in India

Secunderabad Junction - Yesvantpur Junction Garib Rath Express
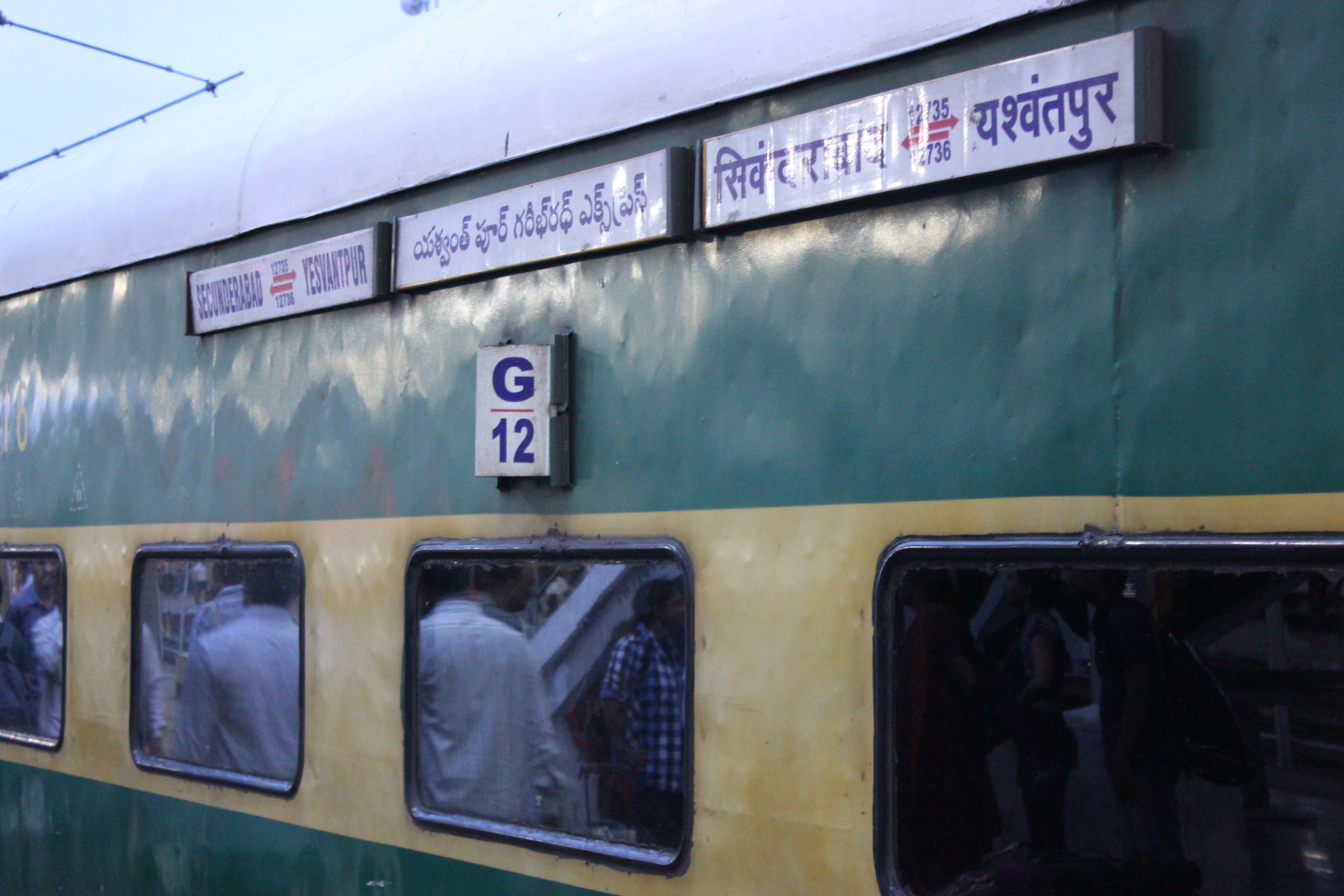
- Garib Rath Express At Yesvantpur Junction railway station

Overview
- Service type: Superfast Express, Garib Rath Express
- First service: 4 February 2008
- Current operator: South Central Railways

Route
- Termini: Secunderabad Junction; Yesvantpur Junction
- Stops: 9
- Distance travelled: 707 km (439 mi)
- Average journey time: 11 hours 50 minutes as 12735 Secunderabad Yesvantpur Garib Rath Express, 12 hours 15 minutes as 12736 Yesvantpur Secunderabad Garib Rath Express.
- Service frequency: 3 days a week. 12735 Secunderabad Yesvantpur Garib Rath Express – Sunday, Wednesday & Friday. 12736 Yesvantpur Secunderabad Garib Rath Express – Monday, Thursday & Saturday.
- Train number: 12735 / 12736

On-board services
- Class: AC 3 tier
- Seating arrangements: No
- Sleeping arrangements: Yes
- Auto-rack arrangements: No
- Catering facilities: No
- Baggage facilities: Storage space under berth

Technical
- Rolling stock: ICF Garib Rath Coaches
- Track gauge: 1,676 mm (5 ft 6 in)
- Electrification: Yes
- Operating speed: 130 km/h (81 mph) maximum,58 km/h (36 mph), including halts

The 12735/36 Secunderabad Yesvantpur Garib Rath Express is a Superfast Express train of the Garib Rath series belonging to Indian Railways - South Central Railway zone that runs between Secunderabad Junction and Yesvantpur Junction in India.

It operates as train number 12735 from Secunderabad Junction to Yesvantpur Junction and as train number 12736 in the reverse direction serving the states of Telangana, Karnataka & Andhra Pradesh.

It is part of the Garib Rath Express series launched by the former railway minister of India, Laloo Prasad Yadav.

== Coaches ==
The 12735 / 36 Secunderabad Yesvantpur Garib Rath Express has 16 AC 3 tier economy and 2 End on Generator Coaches . It does not carry a Pantry car coach .

As is customary with most train services in India, Coach Composition may be amended at the discretion of Indian Railways depending on demand.

== Service ==
The 12735 Secunderabad Yesvantpur Garib Rath Express covers the distance of 707 km (439 mi) in 11 hours 50 mins (60 km/h) and in 12 hours 15 mins as 12736 Yesvantpur Secunderabad Garib Rath Express (58 km/h).

Its fare includes a Superfast surcharge.

== Routeing ==
The 12735 / 36 Secunderabad Yesvantpur Garib Rath Express runs from Secunderabad Junction via Gooty Junction, Dharmavaram Junction, Hindupur to Yesvantpur Junction.

== Traction ==
before WAP7 upgraded, this train run with Ghaziabad WAP-5 or a WAG-9, runs with E-loco end to end from Secunderabad and on 08/11/17, a Lallaguda-based WAP 7 locomotive powers the train for its entire journey. And so was WAP-5 continues haul this train end to end

Before 8 November 2017, this train was hauled by a Kazipet and Moula Ali based WDM-3A and WDP-4D from End to End.

== Operation ==
12735 Secunderabad Yesvantpur Garib Rath Express leaves Secunderabad Junction every Monday, Wednesday & Friday arriving Yesvantpur Junction the next day .

12736 Yesvantpur Secunderabad Garib Rath Express leaves Yesvantpur Junction every Tuesday, Thursday & Sunday arriving Secunderabad Junction the next day .
