= Karimganj Junction railway station =

Railway station in Karimganj, Assam, India

Karimganj Junction

General information
- Location: Railway Colony, Station Rd, Karimganj 788710, Barak Valley, Assam; India
- Coordinates: 24.8603°N 92.3728°E
- Elevation: 20 m (66 ft)
- System: Train station
- Owner: Indian Railways
- Operator: Northeast Frontier Railway
- Lines: Lumding–Sabroom section; Silchar–Sabroom section
- Distance: 72 km from Silchar Airport; 332 Km from Guwahati Airport; 234 Km from Agartala Airport
- Platforms: 2
- Tracks: 3; 2 passenger tracks; 1 Loco reverse track
- Bus routes: NH8; Karimganj–Sabroom Road: NH37; Karimganj–Silchar Road
- Bus stands: Karimganj Bus Stand
- Bus operators: Assam State Transport Corporation
- Connections: Auto rickshaw; E–Rickshaw; Cycle rickshaw

Construction
- Structure type: At grade
- Platform levels: 01
- Parking: Available
- Cycle facilities: Available 🚲
- Accessible: Available♿

Other information
- Status: Functioning
- Station code: KXJ
- Zone(s): Northeast Frontier
- Division(s): Lumding
- Classification: NSG–4
- Website: Karimganj Junction

History
- Opened: 1898; 128 years ago
- Closed: 2014; 12 years ago
- Rebuilt: 2015; 11 years ago
- Former names: Assam Bengal Railway

Key dates
- 2003; 23 years ago: Upgraded with reservation facilities through ticket counters
- 2014; 12 years ago: Closed for gauge conversion
- 2015; 11 years ago: Reopened after gauge conversion
- 2019; 7 years ago: Upgraded with free WiFi facilities

Passengers
- 2018: 5000 approx ▼5% (Daily)

Services
Preceding station	Indian Railways	Following station
New Karimganj towards ?	Northeast Frontier Railway zone Silchar–Sabroom section	Suprakandi towards ?
Location
- Location within Assam Location within India

Karimganj Junction Railway Station serves the Indian city of Karimganj in Assam. It belongs to Lumding railway division of Northeast Frontier Railway zone. It is located in Karimganj district. It is the fourth most busiest railway station in Barak Valley. It is also one of the three railway stations serving the city of Karimganj, the others being Longai and New Karimganj. It is one of the oldest railway station in India built in the year 1898 under Assam Bengal Railway. It consists of two platforms with a total of 15 halting trains. It serves as the main halt for all passenger trains from Silchar, Agartala, Dharmanagar, Dullabcherra, Badarpur, and Mahisasan. The station consists of a single Electric-Line.

== History ==
The station was first inaugurated in 1898 under Assam Bengal Railway. Assam Bengal Railway was incorporated in 1892 to serve British-owned tea plantations in Assam. Assam Bengal Railway had III sections & Karimganj Junction come under Section I named as Comilla–Akhaura–Kulaura–Badarpur section opened in 1896–1898 and finally extended to Lumding in 1903.

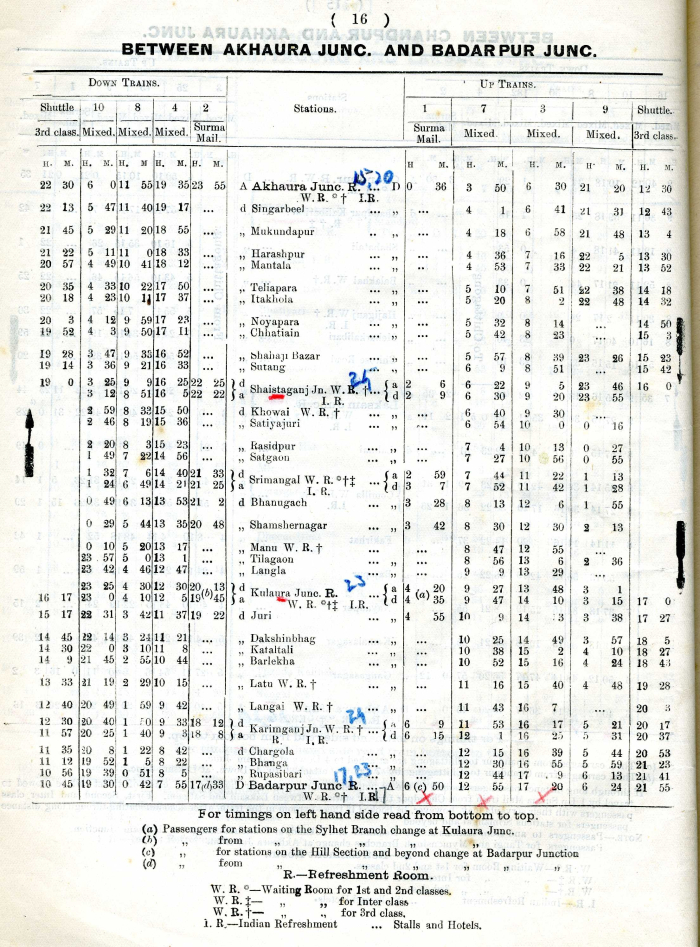
Akhaura Jn. to Badarpur Jn. section under Assam Bengal Railway

== Post gauge conversion ==
After gauge conversion, the station is connected to Tripura via the newly constructed New Karimganj railway station. Following the construction of the New Karimganj railway station, railway traffic into Karimganj Junction has drastically reduced. All long-distance trains, including the Kanchenjunga Express, Humsafar Express, Rajdhani Express, Tripura Sundari Express, and Deoghar–Agartala Weekly Express, bypass the Karimganj Junction completely by short halting and passing through the New Karimganj railway station, instead.

== Station facilities ==
The station contains two platforms serving several passengers. It also contains retiring rooms or passenger waiting rooms with proper sanitation facilities. The station is also upgraded with reservation facilities through ticket counters in the year 2003. Karimganj Junction is also upgraded with RailTel free WiFi facilities.

== Major trains ==
- Guwahati–Dullabcherra Express
- Silchar–Agartala Express
- Silchar – Dharmanagar Passenger
- Dullabcherra – Silchar Passenger
- Badarpur – Dullabcherra Passenger
- Maishashan – Silchar Passenger
- Karimganj – Agartala Demu

== Gallery ==
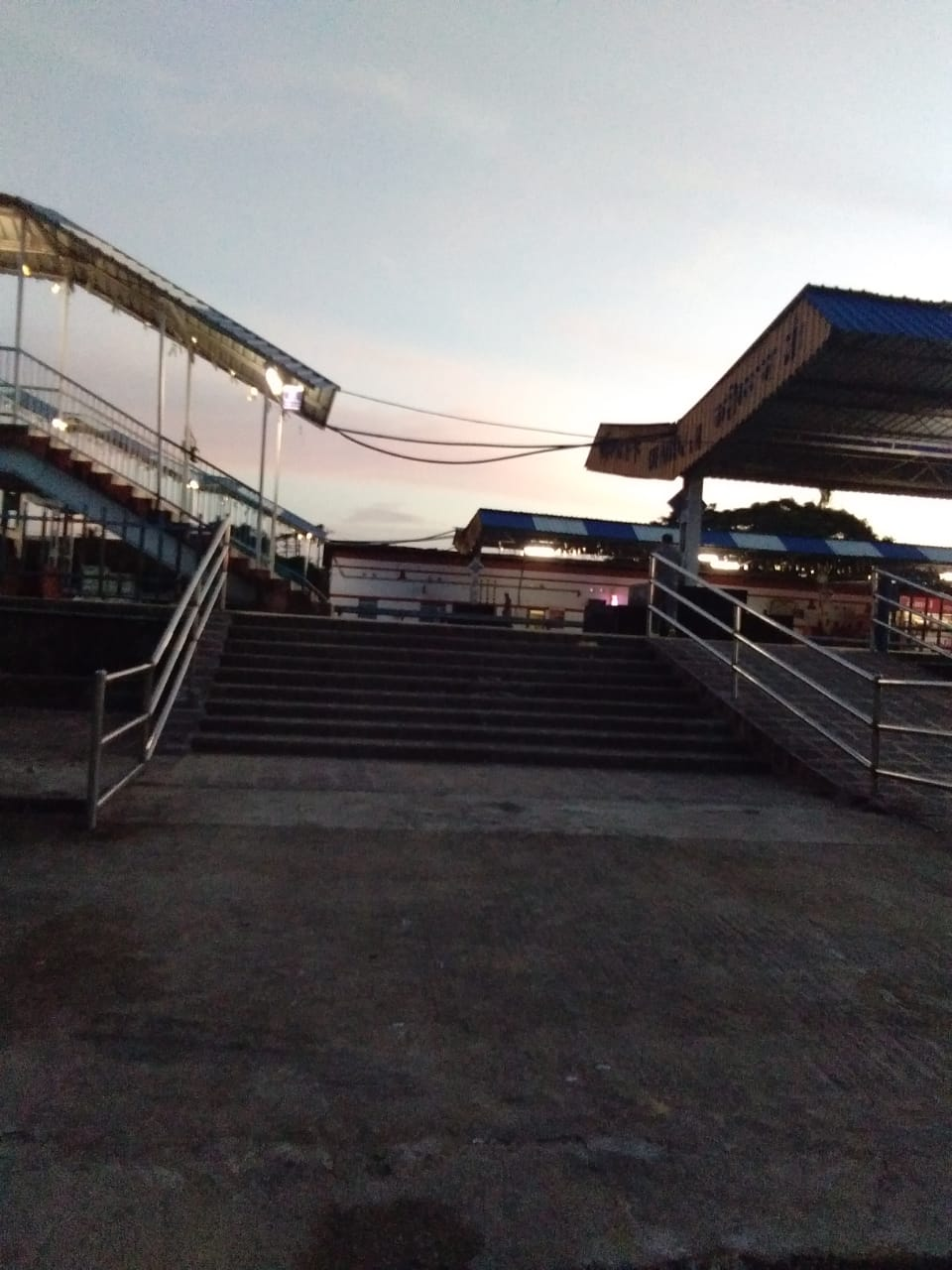
Backside entrance of the station (Platform 2)

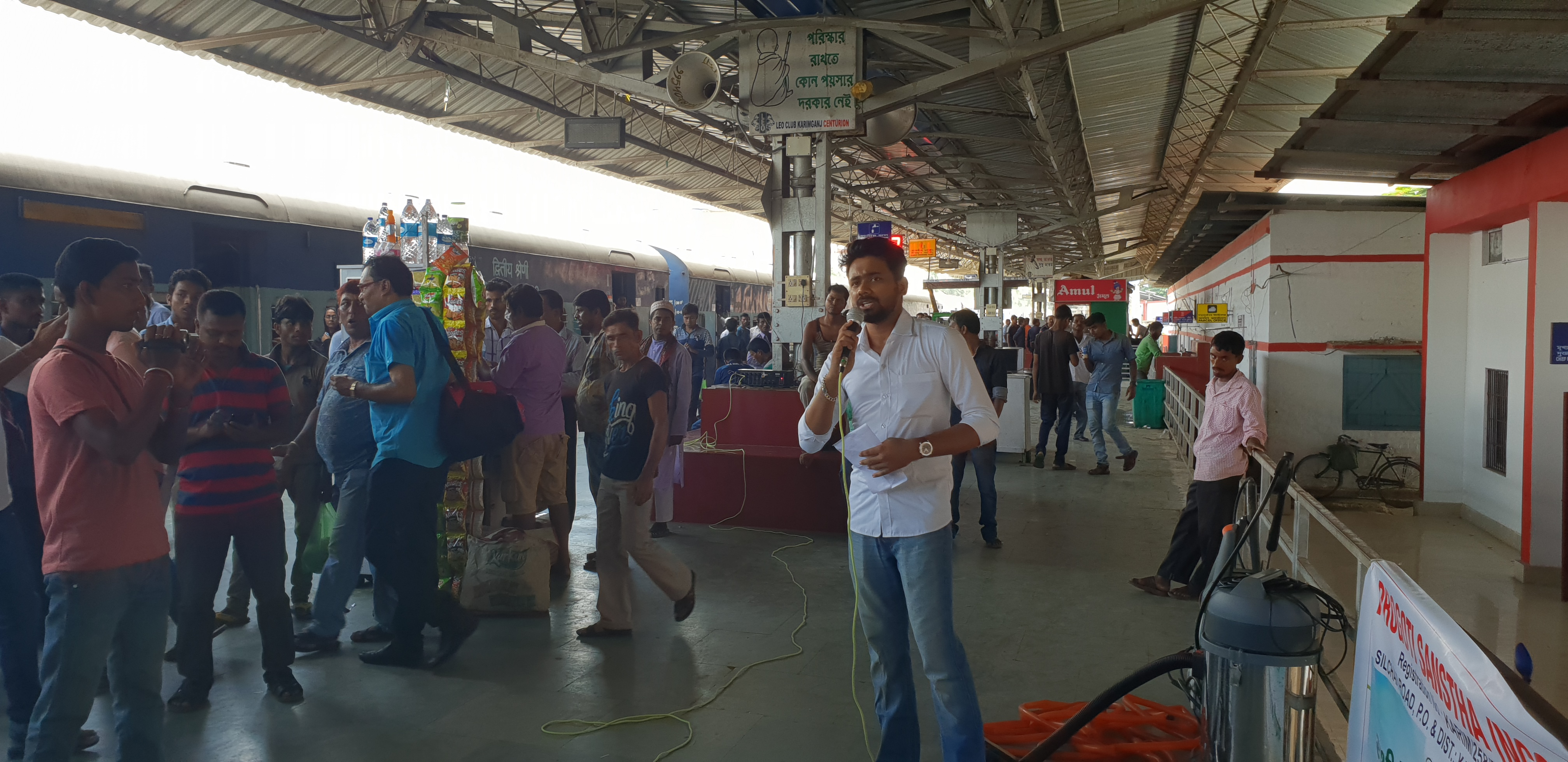
Awareness Programme on Cleanliness in Karimganj Junction

== See also ==
- North Eastern Railway Connectivity Project
- North Western Railway zone
- Railway junctions in India
