= Dullabcherra–Silchar Fast Passenger =

Train in India

55687/UP/Dullabcherra - Silchar Fast Passenger
Overview
- Service type: Fast Passenger
- Locale: Assam (Barak Valley)
- First service: Fri Mar 31, 2017
- Current operator: Northeast Frontier Railway
- Ridership: 585 approx.

Route
- Termini: Dullabcherra (DLCR); Silchar (SCL)
- Stops: 10
- Distance travelled: 100 km (62 mi)
- Average journey time: 4 hours 30 mins
- Service frequency: Tri Weekly
- Train number: 55687 UP/ 55688 DOWN

On-board services
- Class: General (6) SLR (1)
- Seating arrangements: Available
- Sleeping arrangements: Not Available
- Auto-rack arrangements: Not Available
- Catering facilities: ✕ Pantry Car ✕ On-board Catering ✕ E-Catering
- Observation facilities: Windows
- Baggage facilities: Underseat & Upper racks

Technical
- Rolling stock: ICF rakes
- Track gauge: BG
- Electrification: Not Available
- Operating speed: 22 km/h

Dullabcherra Silchar Fast Passenger is a passenger train belonging to Northeast Frontier Railway zone of Indian Railways that runs between Dullabcherra and Silchar, the largest city in Barak Valley of Assam. It is currently being operated with 55687/55688 train numbers on a tri-weekly basis. It shares its rakes with 55689/Dullabcherra–Badarpur Passenger. It makes its main halt at Karimganj Junction for 25 minutes and locomotive/rake reversals also take place there. The train runs with SGUJ/WDP-4D and SGUJ/WDG-4.

== Average speed and frequency ==
The 55687/Dullabcherra–Silchar Fast Passenger runs with an average speed of 22 km/h (14 mph) and completes 100 km (62 mi) in 4h 30m. The 55688/Silchar–Dullabcherra Fast Passenger runs with an average speed of 27 km/h (17 mph) and completes 100 km (62 mi) in 3h 45m.

== Route and halts ==
The halts of the train are:

- Anipur
- Ratabari
- Bazarghat
- Phakhoagram
- Eraligul
- Baraigram Junction
- Nilambazar
- Karimganj Junction
- New Karimganj
- Badarpur Junction

== Coach composite ==
The train has standard ICF rakes with average speed of 22 kmph. The train consists of 7 coaches:

- 6 General Unreserved
- 1 Seating cum Luggage Rake

== Traction ==
Both trains are hauled by a Guwahati Loco Shed based WDM 3A diesel locomotive from Dullabcherra to Silchar and vice versa.

== Rake sharing ==
The train shares its rake with 55689/55690 Dullabcherra–Badarpur Passenger.

== Direction reversal ==
Train reverses its direction 1 time:

- Karimganj Junction
