= Dullabcherra =

- Town
- Location in Assam, India Dullabcherra (India)
- Coordinates: 24°48′N 92°43′E
- Country: India
- State: Assam
- District: Karimganj
- Elevation: 14 m (46 ft)

Languages
  - Official: Bengali and Meitei (Manipuri)
- Time zone: UTC+5:30 (IST)
- PIN: 788736
- Lok Sabha constituency: Karimganj (Lok Sabha constituency)
- Vidhan Sabha constituency: Ratabari (Assembly constituency)

Dullabcherra ( also known as Durllavcherra ) a township located in Karimganj district in the Indian state of Assam. It is 375 kilometres south of the state capital Guwahati and 57 kilometres south of the district headquarters Karimganj.

Bengali and Meitei (Manipuri) are the official languages of this place.

== Etymology ==
The name "Dullabcherra" originated meaning from the Singla River word Dullab (meaning "rare") and cherra (meaning "riverbank").

== Connectivity ==
Dullabcherra is connected by road and railways to the rest of the country.

== Education ==
There’s a wide range of private schools in Dullabcherra, including Education Department Govt of Assam schools.
