= Honghari =

Traditional religion followed by the Karbi people in Karbi Anglong, India

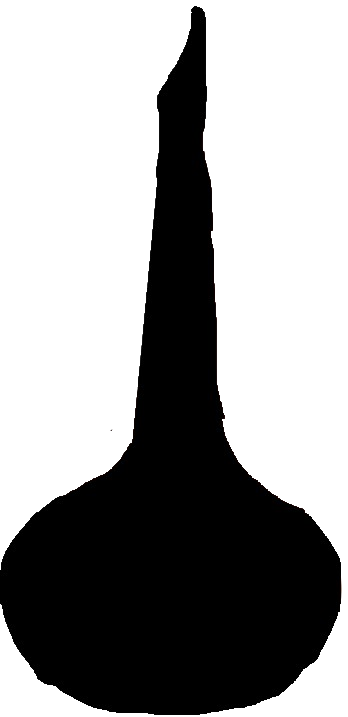
- Type: Indigenous
- Region: Karbi Anglong, West Karbi Anglong
- Founder: Hemphu, Mukrang, Rasinja
- Other name: Aronban
- Slogan: Hem Hem Arnam, Hemphu Arnam

Honghari is the indigenous religion practice by the Karbi people of Assam in Karbi Anglong.The traditional religion of Karbi people is called Honghari. It has also been called as a Hindu version of amnism. A section of karbis use the term Hindu Honghari instead. Some followers of Karbi indigenous faith identify as Hindus instead as the Honghari.

The Karbi religion and belief system is rooted in ritual ancestor worship, the veneration of household and territorial deities, and ceremonies for ancestors known as 'Karhi'. At the core of their spiritual tradition is the divine duo Hemphu and Mukrang, who hold the most prominent place in the Karbi pantheon. Karbis who continue to follow traditional practices are known as followers of Hemphu-Mukrang, and they often refer to themselves as 'Hemphu-Mukrang aso', meaning "children of Hemphu and Mukrang." Karbi deities are generally categorized into three groups based on their roles: Hem-Angtar, Rongker, and Thengpi-Thengso. Sabin Alun is the Karbi version of Ramayana.

== Festival ==
=== Rongker ===
Rongker is the major festival celebrated by the Karbi people every year, usually in January or February depending on the village. It is usually celebrated to promote the well-being and prosperity of the villagers. The festival aims to ward off evil influences and to seek blessings from deities associated with nature, such as those of crops, rivers, and mountains.

=== Chomangkan ===
Chomangkan, also known as Karhi, is more than a mourning ceremony — it is a profound cultural event that reflects the Karbi community's perspective on death, remembrance, and continuity. Unlike typical funerals held soon after death, Chomangkan is often conducted months or even years later, sometimes honoring several deceased family members at once. This delay elevates the ceremony into a rich social and spiritual gathering that involves the entire community. In Karbi belief, death is not the end of life but a passage to the ancestral realm known as Rong Arak.

=== Hacha-Kekan ===
Hacha-Kekan is a festival celebrated after the harvest, marked by joy and communal rejoicing. Unlike Rongker, it involves no rituals to appease deities and carries no element of fear. Therefore, it can be considered a secular celebration, distinct in nature from religious festivals like Rongker.

== See also ==
- Rongker, traditional festival of Karbi people of Assam.
- Timung, Karbi clans.
- Lokhimon
