= National Highway 29 (India) =

National highway in India

National Highway 29
- Map of the National Highway in red at Jessami

Route information
- Part of AH1 AH2
- Length: 338.5 km (210.3 mi)

Major junctions
- West end: Dabaka
- East end: Jessami

Location
- Country: India
- States: Assam, Nagaland, Manipur

Highway system
- Roads in India; Expressways; National; State; Asian
← NH 28	→ NH 30

National Highway 29 (NH 29) is a primary national highway in India. This highway was previously part of old national highways 36, 39 and 150. Due to rationalisation of national highway numbers of India by Gazette notification on 5 March 2010, it was renumbered as National Highway 29. NH-29 runs across the Indian states of Assam, Nagaland and end at the border of Manipur. This national highway is 338.5 km (210.3 mi) long.

== Route ==
NH29 connects Dabaka (Sutargaon), Manja in Assam to Dimapur, Chümoukedima, Kohima, Chizami in Nagaland and terminates at Jessami in the State of Manipur.

=== Assam ===
Dabaka - Dokmoka - Bakulia - Manja - Amlakhi

=== Nagaland ===
Dimapur - Chümoukedima - Kohima - Chizami

=== Manipur ===
Jessami

== Junctions ==
Schematic map of National Highways in India

Assam
NH 27 Terminal near Dabaka.
NH 329 near Manja
Nagaland
NH 129 near Dimapur
NH 129A near Dimapur
NH 2 near Kohima
Manipur
NH 202 Terminal near Jessami.

== See also ==
- List of national highways in India
- List of national highways in India by state
