= Deopani Durga Mandir =

Ancient temple of Devi Durga in Assam, India

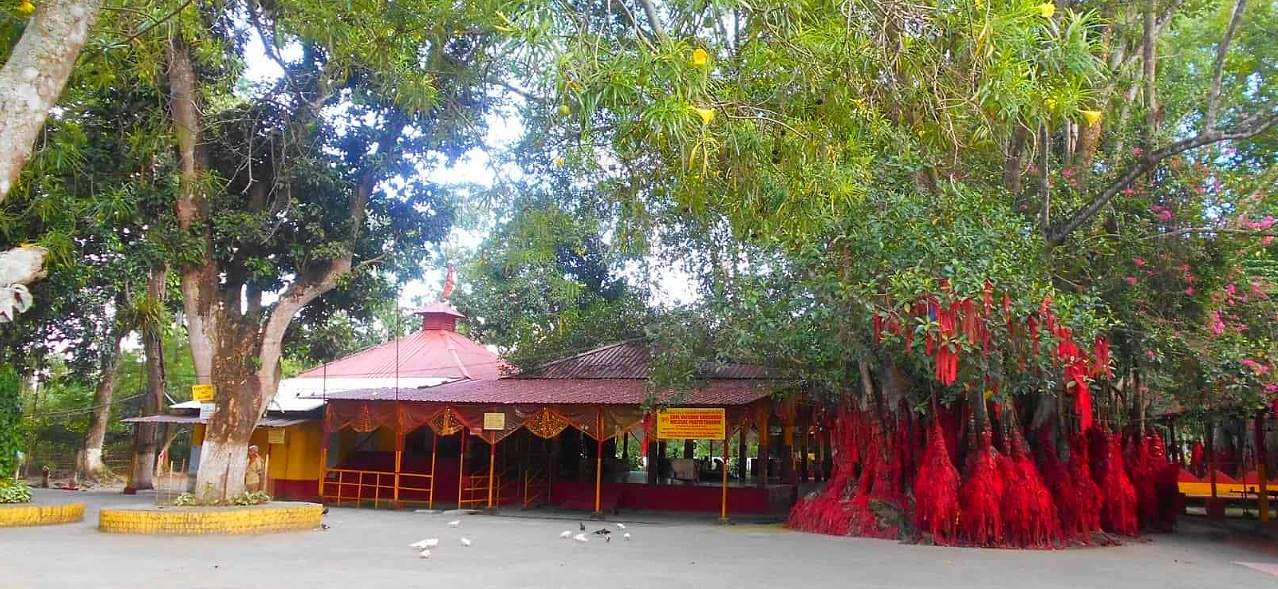

Religion
- Affiliation: Hinduism
- District: Karbi Anglong
- Deity: Goddess Durga
- Festival: Durga Puja

Location
- State: Assam
- Country: India
- Interactive map of Deopani Durga Mandir
- Coordinates: 26.21885°N 93.82750°E

Website
- https://deopanidurgamandir.com

Deopani Durga Mandir is a Hindu Shakti temple of Goddess Durga situated in Asian Highway 1, Borsewaguri, Bokajan, Karbi Anglong, Assam, India – 782470.

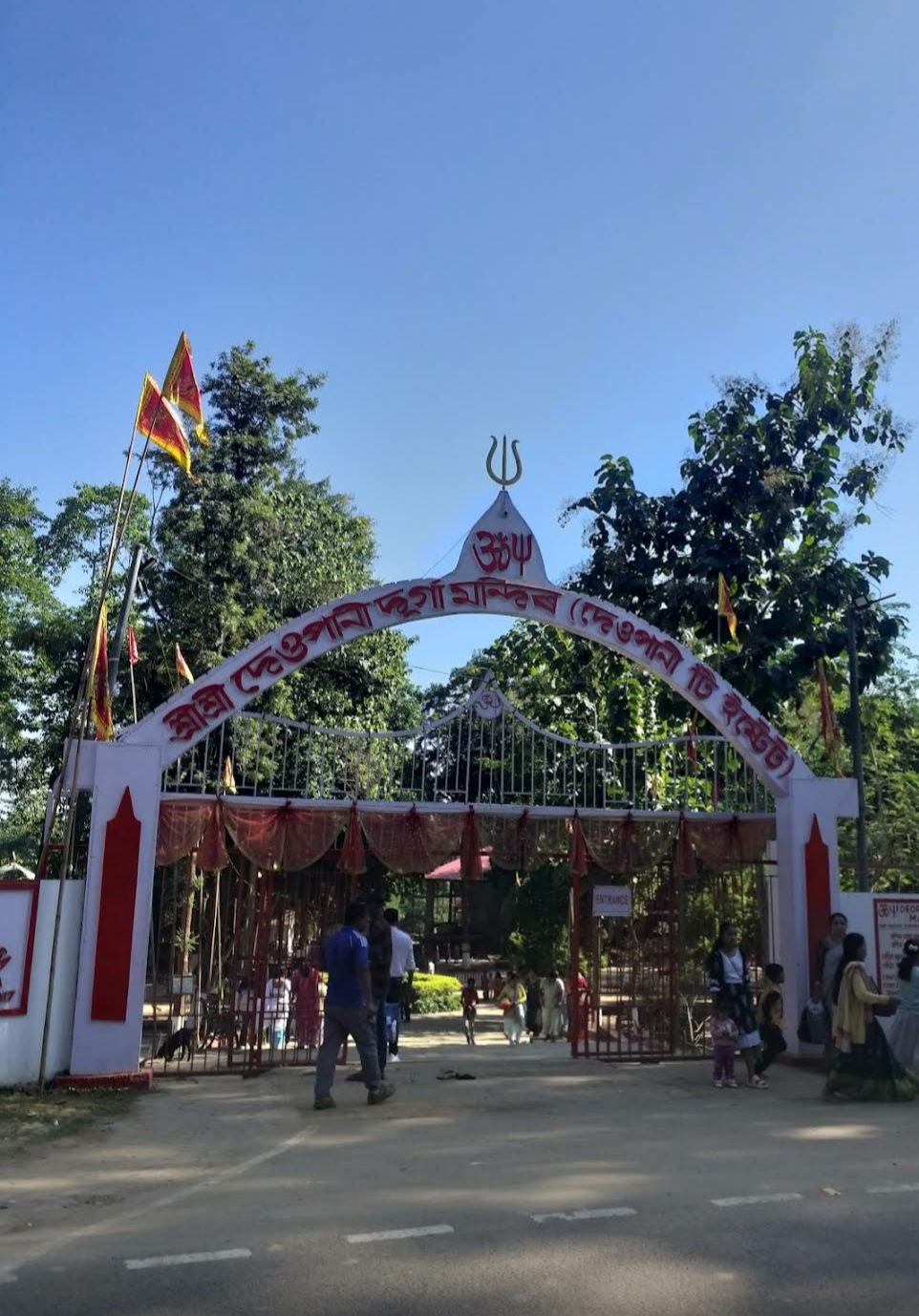
Deopani Durga Mandir, Assam

== Location ==
The location coordinates of Deopani Durga Mandir are 26.21885°N 93.82750°E.

== History ==
The idol of the temple was excavated by a Rajput tea planter Surendra Nath Roy (Nunu Babu) along with some other archaeological materials from his family owned Deopani Tea Estate and the temple was established in a little distance from the site where the idol was discovered. A significant amount of archaeological findings from the Deopani area are documented. Currently, the temple is managed by a trust. Durga Puja is celebrated annually in the temple.
