= Karbi Anglong Autonomous Council =

Autonomous district council in Assam, India

Type
- Type: Autonomous District Council

Leadership
- Chief Executive Member: Tuliram Ronghang, BJP

Structure
- Seats: 26 Members
- Political groups: Government (26) BJP (26)

Elections
- Last election: June 2022
- Next election: 2027

Meeting place
- Diphu, Assam

Website
- karbianglong.co.in

Karbi Anglong Autonomous Council (KAAC) is an autonomous district council in the state of Assam, India for development and protection of tribals living in area namely Karbi Anglong and West Karbi Anglong district. The council is constituted under the provisions of the Sixth Schedule of the Constitution of India and administratively functions under the Government of Assam. Its headquarters is in Diphu, Karbi Anglong district. The total administrative area of the council is 10,434 km^{2} with a population of 961,275 as of 2011.

== History ==
The Government of India passed a bill in Lok Sabha in the year 1951 and Indian President Rajendra Prasad assented to the creation of United Mikir and North Cachar Hills District. In 1970, the district of United Mikir and North Cachar Hills district was bifurcated into two separate districts under banner as "Mikir Hills" and "North Cachar Hills" district. In 1976, the Mikir Hill district was again rechristened as "Karbi Anglong District" w.e.f. 14 October 1976 vide Govt. Notification No. TAD/R/115/74/47 Dtd. 14–10–1976. Thus, Karbi Anglong became a full-fledged separate district in the Indian state of Assam with its headquarter at Diphu.

It was formed with the name Karbi Anglong District Council on 17 November 1951. Later changed to Karbi Anglong Autonomous Council on 23 June 1952, which is now celebrated as its foundation day. After Signing of M.O.U. between Government of India, Government of Assam and United People's Democratic Solidarity, it was renamed to Karbi Anglong Autonomous Territorial Council. It has administrative functions over two districts, Karbi Anglong district and West Karbi Anglong district.

On 1 April 1996, the Karbi Anglong District Council was renamed as the Karbi Anglong Autonomous Council [KAAC] by an Act of Parliament by incorporating into the Sixth Schedule in the Constitution (Amendment) Act, 1995 (42 of 1995) of the Constitution of India granting greater autonomy to the Council vide Govt. Notification No. HAD.57/95/63-64, dtd. 29.06.1995, and entrusted 30 (thirty) more department to Karbi Anglong Autonomous Council along with other sponsored schemes for the welfare of indigenous people. Further, a tripartite Memorandum of Settlement (MoS) was signed between the Central Government, Government of Assam and United People's Democratic Solidarity (UPDS) in the presence of Union Home Minister Shri P. Chidambaram and Assam Chief Minister Shri Tarun Gogoi in accordance with which the Karbi Anglong Autonomous Council will be re-christened as KARBI ANGLONG AUTONOMOUS TERRITORIAL COUNCIL.

On 15 August 2015, the district was further bifurcated into two districts, namely Karbi Anglong and West Karbi Anglong Districts. As such the purview of the present Karbi Anglong Autonomous Council (KAAC) has jurisdiction over two full-fledged districts.

== Structure ==
=== Executive branch ===
Heading the Executive Wing of the ADC is the Executive Committee whose duties are similar to those of the Cabinet of the State. The head of the Executive Committee, that is, the Chief Executive Member is elected by majority votes by the Council in Session and such election is to be approved by the Governor of the State. The Chief Executive Member then nominates Members of the Executive Committee from amongst the members of the Council. The Executive Committee remains in Office as long as they enjoy the majority support of Members of the Council.

List of Chief Executive Members

The list of politicians that served as the CEM of KAAC is given below:

Sl. No.	Name	From	To
1	Sri. Khor Sing Terang	23 June 1952	28 November 1955
2	Sri. Nihang Rongphar	15 December 1955	25 June 1956
3	Sri. Chatra Sing Teron	26 June 1956	15 September 1957
4	Sri. Nihang Rongphar	25 June 1957	2 December 1957
5	Sri. Chandra Sing Teron	3 May 1957	25 June 1962
6	Sri. Dhaniram Rongpi	26 June 1962	21 March 1971
7	Sri. Dhaniram Rongpi	24 March 1971	22 September 1972
8	Sri. Joysing Doloi	12 December 1972	4 May 1978
9	Sri. Khorsing Bey	11 May 1978	24 September 1979
10	Sri. Bidya Sing Engleng	28 September 1979	13 December 1979
11	Sri. Bidya Sing Engleng	18 January 1980	2 January 1981
12	Sri. Biren Sing Engti	3 March 1981	16 January 1983
13	Sri. Bidya Sing Engleng	26 February 1983	27 February 1983
14	Sri. Bidya Sing Engleng	28 January 1984	7 August 1985
15	Sri. Khor Sing Engti	9 August 1985	11 September 1985
16	Sri. Mongal Sing Engti	15 November 1985	26 November 1986
17	Sri. Bidya Sing Engleng	5 December 1986	22 January 1989
18	Dr. Jayanta Rongpi	25 January 1989	11 June 1996
19	Sri. Jotson Bey	21 June 1996	29 July 2000
20	Sri. Mojari Hanse	31 July 2000	15 March 2001
21	Sri. Khor Sing Engti	11 January 2002	18 March 2002
22	Sri. Khor Sing Engti	19 March 2002	17 May 2006
23	Sri. Sum Ronghang	3 June 2006	19 January 2007
24	Sri. Mongal Sing Engti	23 January 2007	12 January 2009
25	Sri. Joy Ram Engleng	13 January 2009	12 January 2012
26	Sri. Joy Ram Engleng	20 January 2012	15 October 2013
27	Sri. Tuliram Ronghang	17 October 2013	4 July 2017
28	Sri. Tuliram Ronghang	7 July 2017	22 June 2022
29	Sri. Tuliram Ronghang	23 June 2022	Present

=== Legislative branch ===
The Council hold a session quarterly (every four months). The Annual Budget of the Autonomous District Council has to be passed by majority votes in the session. The other duties of the Council in session are to legislate and enact laws and regulations on such powers as conferred by the Sixth Schedule. Bills on laws and regulations passed by the Council in session are sent to the Governor of the State for his assent or approval.

To run the affairs of the Legislative Secretariat, the Council in session elects a chairman and deputy chairman whose duties are similar to the Speaker and the Deputy Speaker of the State Legislature respectively. The Office of the Legislative is looked after by officers and staff headed by the Secretary Legislative.

== Subjects under KAAC ==
There are 30 subjects under the jurisdiction of Karbi Anglong Autonomous Council. The 30 subjects are listed in the table below:

List of subjects under Karbi Anglong Autonomous Council (KAAC)
Sl. no.	Name of the Subject
1	Industry
2	Animal Husbandry and Veterinary
3	Forest
4	Agriculture
5	P.W.D
6	Sericulture
7	Education (Primary, higher secondary and adult education)
8	Cultural affairs
9	Soil conservation
10	Co-operation
11	Fisheries
12	Panchayat and rural development including DRDA
13	Handloom and textile
14	Health and family welfare
15	Public health engineering
16	Irrigation
17	Social welfare
18	Flood control
19	Sports and youth welfare
20	Weights and measures
21	Food and civil supplies
22	Town and country planning
23	College education including library, museum and archaeology
24	Land reforms
25	Publicity and public relations
26	Printing and stationery
27	Tourism
28	Transport
29	Excise
30	Finance including sales tax, excise and professional tax

== Election ==
The council held their own election separate from National and State assembly. Elections are held every 5 years.

=== 2022 Elections ===
BJP swept the election by winning all 26 seat of the council. Tuliram Ronghang is appointed as Chief Executive of the council.

== See also ==
- Karbi people
- Karbi language
- Karbi Youth Festival
- Autonomous administrative divisions of India
- Hill tribes of Northeast India
- North Eastern Council
