= National Highway 329A (India) =

National highway in India

National Highway 329A
- Map of the National Highway in red

Route information
- Length: 36 km (22 mi)

Major junctions
- West end: Diphu
- East end: Pimpla

Location
- Country: India
- States: Assam, Nagaland

Highway system
- Roads in India; Expressways; National; State; Asian
← NH 329	→ NH 129A

National Highway 329A, commonly called 329A is a national highway in India. It is a spur road of National Highway 329. NH-329A traverses the states of Assam and Nagaland in India.

== Route ==
Diphu – Dimapur.

== Junctions ==
NH 329 Terminal near Diphu.
NH 129A Terminal near Rangapahar (Dimapur).

== See also ==
- List of national highways in India
- List of national highways in India by state
