= Chungajan =

- Town
- Location in Assam, India Chungajan (India)
- Coordinates: 26°03′26″N 93°49′09″E
- Country: India
- State: Assam
- District: Golaghat

Area
  - Total: 1.5 km^{2} (0.58 sq mi)
- Elevation: 124 m (407 ft)

Languages
  - Official: Assamese
- Time zone: UTC+5:30 (IST)
- PIN: 785601
- Area code: 03774
- Vehicle registration: AS-05

Chungajan is a growth center located in the Upper Assam district of Golaghat, India. It is located 60 km south of Golaghat, the district headquarters. It is 23 km away from Dimapur.

== Economy ==
Chungajan is an agrarian economy. Rice, vegetables were mainly cultivated in the region. The place is famous for the production of betel nut and broiler poultry farming.

== Locality ==
Chungajan is a Countryside area comprising three Gaon Panchayat. Chungajan Growth Center spread in an area of 1.5 km^{2}. There is a Railway station, Police Station, Post Office, Mini Primary Health Center and few commercial buildings in the growth center making it an unincorporated town.

== Transportation ==
Place is well connected by road and railways. A state highway passes through the center. Chongajan is a small railway station in the Tinsukia railway division of Northeast Frontier Railway. Industrial town Bokajan is just 5 km away from Chungajan. The Dimapur Airport is the nearest airport with a distance of 29 km.

== Education ==
=== Government School ===
There are three government schools within the growth center, alongside several additional schools in the surrounding villages.

- Chungajan High School- This School has a long history. The school will be upgraded to Higher Secondary School. Construction of the building is already completed.
- Chungajan ME School
- Chungajan Kendriya LP School

=== Private School ===
- Gyanpith Jatiya Vidyalaya - Most promising school in the entire region. One of the student from the 1st batch able to secure in top 10rank in Assam Matriculation Exam (2010). Its alumni is presently studying in NIT Silchar, Tezpur University, etc.
- CB Memorial English High School.
- Sancha Memorial English Academy.
- Little Learners Academy.
