= Lokhimon =

Hindu religious reform movement among the Karbi people of Northeast India

- Lokhimon Adhorom
- Classification: New religious movement / Reform movement
- Orientation: Syncretic Vaishnavite reform with Karbi elements
- Region: Assam and Arunachal Pradesh
- Language: Karbi, Assamese
- Founder: Kurusar Lokhon Engti Hensek
- Origin: 4–5 February 1959; Karbi Anglong region, Northeast India

Lokhimon (Lokhimon Adhorom or Aronkimi) is a religious movement originating among the Karbi people of Northeast India in the mid-20th century. Scholars describe it as an indigenous reform tradition combining elements of Karbi ancestral religion with devotional (bhakti) practices strongly influenced by Vaishnavism.

== History ==
Lokhimon traces its beginning to 4–5 February 1959 under the leadership of Kurusar Lokhon Engti (also spelled Lokhon Engti Hensek). In subsequent decades, congregational centres and prayer houses were established in different Karbi settlements, particularly in Karbi Anglong, and participation gradually expanded.

== Beliefs and practices ==
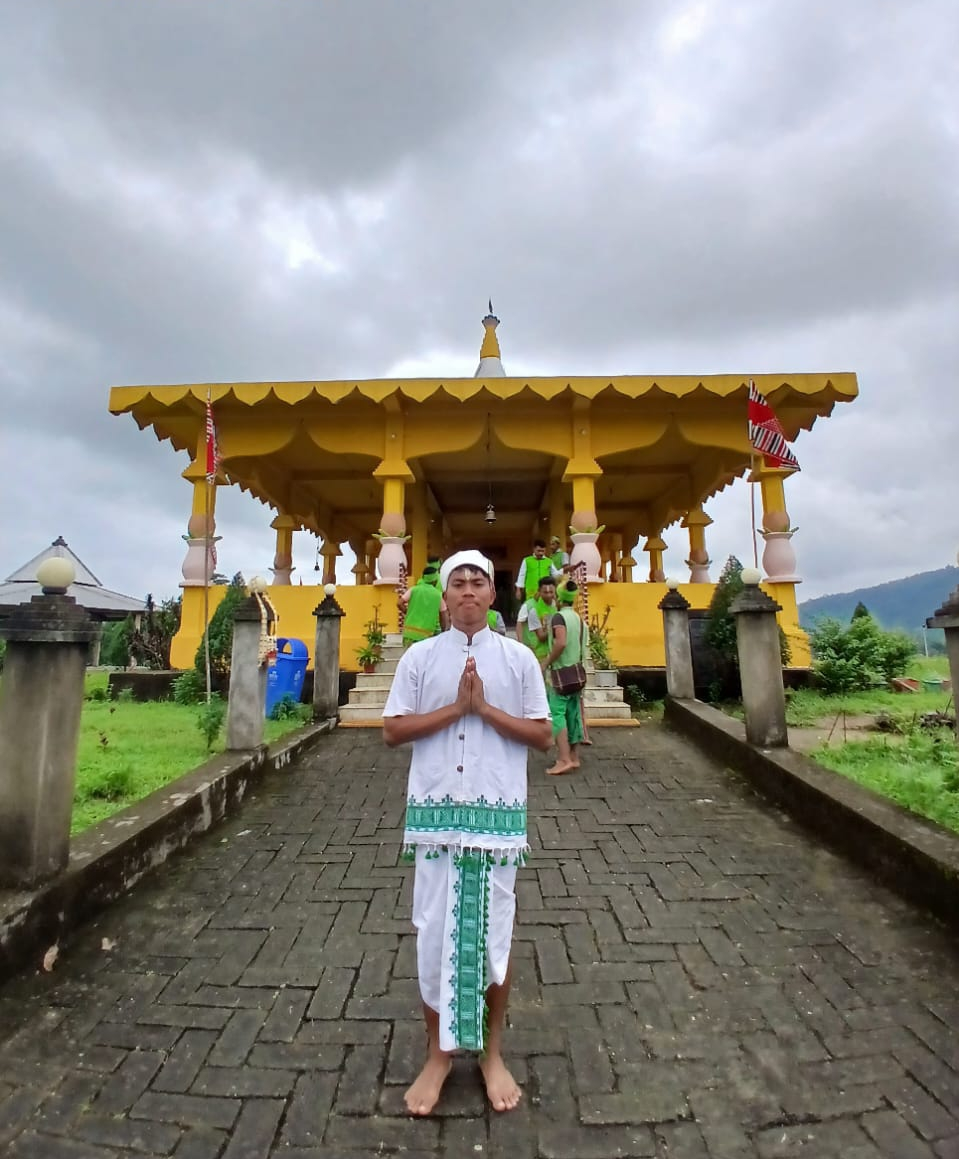
a Lokhimon temple

The movement incorporates Karbi ancestral beliefs while adopting Vaishnavite themes centred on devotion and moral discipline. The founder occupies a revered role within the movement's theological framework, and hymns, prayers and narratives associated with him form an important textual and ritual corpus. The place of worship, Lokhimon temples resembles the shankh (shonkho/pongot) and it has a structure of snake on top of it, which are associated with Vishnu. In the temple, idol worship is not done instead a diya (single earthen lamp) is placed. The offeringsmade to Vishnu includes flowers, fruits etc. Thursday is considered very auspicious day and on that day Lokhimons visits the temple and observe a strict vegetarian diet.

Among followers of Lokhimon, wearing a sacred thread called Legam or Sun-lek is an essential religious practice. This tradition is comparable to the sacred thread worn by Brahmins in mainstream Hinduism; however, unlike the Brahmanical system, the practice among Lokhimon followers is mandatory for all adherents including women.

The movement about 114 worship centers called Lokhimon adovan (temples) and has four ashrams also called Dovan Longri Anei:

- Bapuram Tokbi village, Assam
- Japralangso, Assam
- Kokila, Arunachal Pradesh
- Rongnagar, Bakulia, Assam

== Festivals and observances ==
The most significant annual event is the Foundation Day, commonly known as Karcho or Lokhimon Karcho, held on or around 4–5 February to mark the origin of the movement in 1959 under Kurusar Lokhon Engti Hensek. The observance typically lasts several days and includes congregational prayer, the recitation of hymns connected to the founder, ritual cleaning and renewal of the prayer houses, and large community feasts. Some of these observances take place at Dolamara Bokaram Tokbi village, which is closely associated with the early development of the movement and functions as one of its symbolic centres.

Besides fixed commemorations, Lokhimon congregations regularly conduct community feasts and cultural gatherings, often featuring musical and dramatic performances that express the history and teachings of the movement. In many congregations these occasions have taken the place of earlier animal-sacrifice rituals, in line with the reformist and devotional ethos emphasised within Lokhimon.

Although Lokhimon has developed its own ritual calendar, several observances occur in proximity to cycles in the wider Karbi religious calendar; for example, Karcho frequently follows the traditional Karbi festival Rongker, reinforcing symbolism of renewal and community identity.

== Demography ==
Lokhimon is followed primarily among sections of the Karbi population of Assam and, to a smaller extent, Arunachal Pradesh. In some settlements it is the predominant religious affiliation, while in others it coexists with Karbi ancestral religion and Christianity.

The movement has about 60,000 to 1 lakh followers.

== See also ==
- Karbi people
- Honghari
- Religion in Assam
