= Diphu Medical College and Hospital =

Indian institute of medical education

Coordinates: 25.828347°N 93.424794°E

- Motto: सर्वे सन्तु निरामयाः
- Motto in English: May no one suffer from illness
- Type: Medical college
- Established: November 25, 2019; 6 years ago
- Affiliations: Srimanta Sankaradeva University of Health Sciences, NMC
- Principal: Dr. Sumitra Hagjer
- Undergraduates: 100
- Location: Diphu, Assam, 782460, India
- Campus: Sub Urban
- Language: English, Assamese
- Website: diphumch.assam.gov.in
- Location within Assam Location within India

Diphu Medical College and Hospital is a medical college with an attached hospital located in Diphu, Assam. It started functioning on 25 November 2019. This is the 7th medical college in the state. The college operates under the State Ministry of Health and Family Welfare, Assam. It is recognised by the National Medical Commission and affiliated with Srimanta Sankaradeva University of Health Sciences, Guwahati.

== History ==
The construction was initiated with the laying of the foundation stone by Himanta Biswa Sarma on 19 January 2011. In 2017, the budget for the construction of the college was increased from ₹156.55 to ₹209 Crores Indian rupee. The construction began in 2012, but the final plan for the college was approved on 28 April 2018, after the architectural design was revised three times.

Brahmaputra Infrastructures was responsible for the construction of the Assam Hills Medical College and Research Institute (AHMC&RI). On 21 November 2019, it was renamed Diphu Medical College and Hospital in the interest of the general public.

== College ==
Currently, the college has a capacity of 100 undergraduate students, from the academic year 2020–21. The college has a modern library and an air-conditioned lecture hall. The college has facilities like hostel accommodation of 204 seats (102 rooms) each for Boys, Girls, and Nursing staff. As well 75 room for Demonstrator.

== Hospital ==
Currently, the hospital has 416 beds. 24x7 hours emergency services including ambulance. COVID-19 testing and diagnosis facility, Intensive Care Unit, Operating theater, Blood bank, Radiology like X-ray & Ultrasonography, Medical laboratory, Pharmacy etc. along with a modern kitchen.

The hospital has an Out-Patient Department (OPD) from 8AM to 2PM, Monday to Saturday. In-house patient's visiting hours are from 4 PM to 6 PM. Doctor visit for in-house, admitted patient's are from 10AM and 6PM.

== Transport ==
Auto-rickshaw are available on campus site. Diphu railway station, bus station, and town market is approximately 1 km away. Nearest airport is Dimapur Airport at Dimapur (approx. 50 km away). Nearest public Helipad is at Taralangso (9 km away). The hospital entry gate is situated on NH-329, the hospital campus is another 0.5 km away.

== Gallery ==
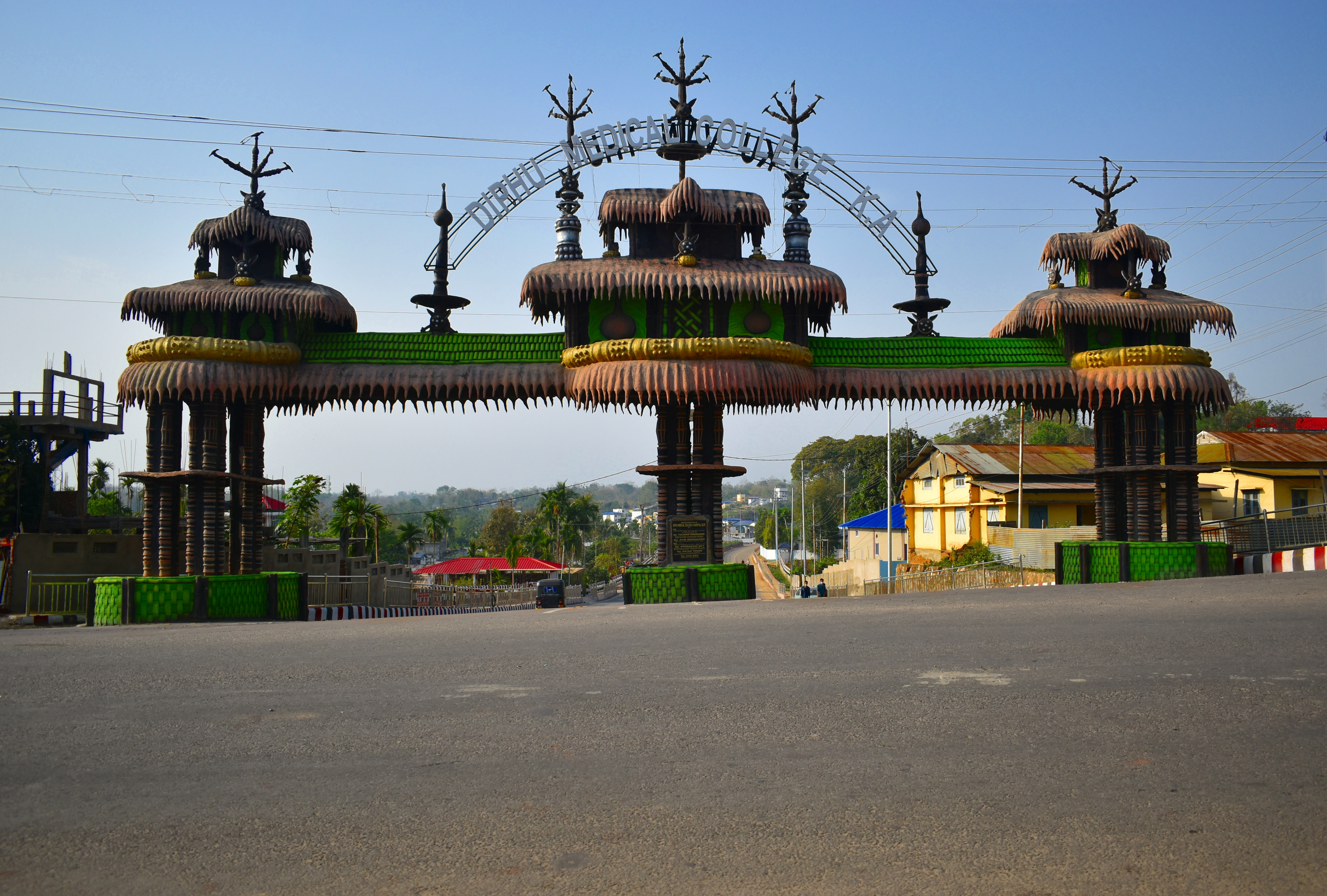
Entry gate on NH-329

== See also ==
- Education in India
- Literacy in India
- List of institutions of higher education in Assam
