= Karbi-Kuki conflict =

Ethnic conflict in Assam, India

- Date: 2003–2004
- Location: Karbi Anglong district, Assam, India

Parties
Karbi people United People's Democratic Solidarity(UPDS)	Kuki people Kuki Revolutionary Army (KRA)

Casualties and losses
54	23

The Kuki-Karbi conflict is an ethnic conflict between the Kuki people and Karbi people in the Karbi Anglong district of Assam, India. The conflict has its roots in disputes over land, resources and political representation between the two groups.

== Background ==
The Karbi Anglong district is home to several ethnic groups including the majority Karbi tribe as well as Kuki tribes like the Thadou and Hmar. The Karbi Anglong district has been aspiring for an autonomous state status since 1986, represented by the Autonomous State Demand Committee (ASDC). The Kuki population, initially numbering 15 in the 1951 census, rose to 2,914 in 1961. By 1971, it reached 21,034 in Assam, but then decreased to 21,883 by 1991, suggesting a pattern of inward migration followed by outward migration. The Apex Kuki organization in Karbi Anglong, the Kuki National Assembly (KNA), was also seeking the establishment of an autonomous regional council for the Kuki people, who primarily reside in the Singhasan Hills region. This growth is seen as a potential challenge to the Karbi groups' aspirations. Tensions between the two groups have existed for decades, fueled by competition for land, political power and resources in the district.

In the late 1990s and early 2000s, the conflict escalated into violence between militant groups representing the two communities. The United People's Democratic Solidarity(UPDS), a Karbi militant group, clashed with the Kuki Revolutionary Army (KRA), a Kuki militant outfit based in Manipur.

== 2002–2004 clashes ==
The most intense phase of the conflict occurred between October 2003 and March 2004. During this period, the KRA and the anti-talks faction of the UPDS killed an estimated 85 people, mostly men, in Karbi Anglong. The casualties included at least 23 Kukis and 54 Karbis. Assam chief minister Tarun Gogoi today requested Delhi to ban the Kuki Revolutionary Army (KRA), saying the militant group was “behind much of the violence” in Karbi Anglong district.

In March 2004, the violence reached its peak. On March 24, the KRA killed 34 Karbi tribals in separate incidents in the villages of Udentisu, Tarak Teron and Jari Teron. Five more Karbis were killed in various villages on March 27. The KRA claimed it was retaliating to the killing of six Kukis by the UPDS on March 19.The March 24 incident resulted in the highest civilian casualty in a single day in Assam. It was also the largest civilian casualty in Karbi Anglong since the pro-talks UPDS faction signed a ceasefire agreement with the Indian government in 2002.

== Causes and consequences ==
The conflict is driven by several factors including competition for land and resources, political representation, and the activities of militant groups. According to then Assam's chief minister, Tarun Gogoi, the KRA, a militant group from Manipur, believed to be responsible for the majority of recent clashes in the district. He had asked Delhi to ban the Kuki Revolutionary Army (KRA) due to their involvement in the violence in Karbi Anglong district. The UPDS, formed by the merger of the Karbi National Volunteers and Karbi People's Front in 1999, aimed to drive out non-Karbi populations from Karbi Anglong. This threatened the Kuki community.The violence has had a devastating impact on the local population. Hundreds of people have been killed, thousands displaced, and villages destroyed. The conflict has also hindered development in the district.

== Attempts at resolution ==
Several attempts have been made to resolve the conflict. The Indian Army was deployed to Karbi Anglong to control the violence. The government also initiated peace talks with the UPDS, leading to a ceasefire agreement in 2002. However, the anti-talks faction of the UPDS continued to engage in violence. The conflict remains unresolved fully, with sporadic incidents of violence continuing to occur in Karbi Anglong.

== See also ==
- Kuki-Naga conflict in Manipur
- Kuki–Paite Conflict
- 2023 Manipur violence
