= Rongker =

Annual winter festival

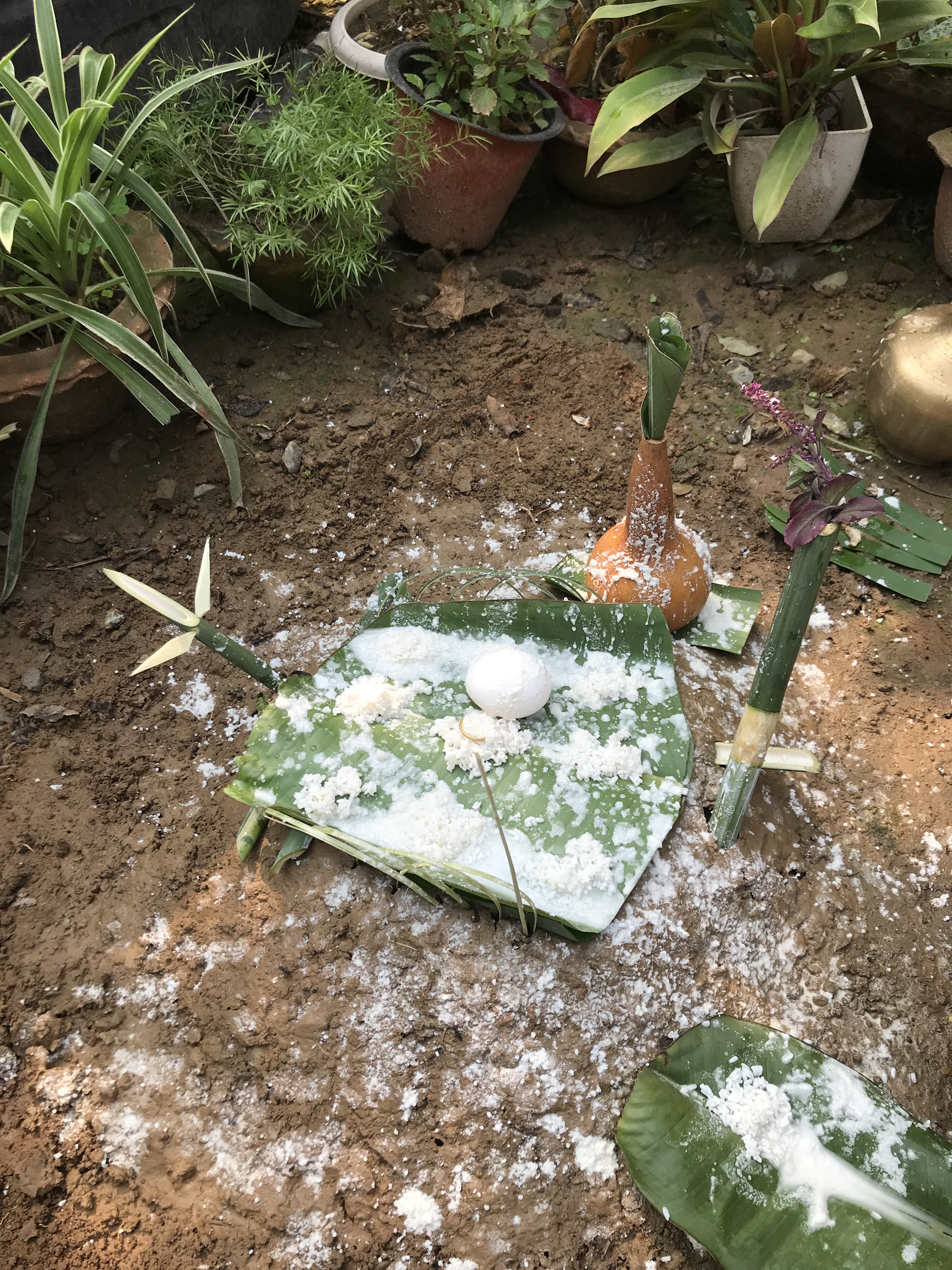
- An image of Duwan (Altar).
- Genre: Folk
- Dates: 5th January
- Frequency: Annual
- Locations: Karbi Anglong, Assam, India
- Area: Assam, India
- Patron: Karbi

Rongker is an annual winter time festival of merriment observed by the Karbis of Assam. It is also known as Dehal in Dumra Longri i.e. Kamrup Metropolitan district of Assam and Ri-Bhoi district of Meghalaya. It is observed in order to appease the local deities, associated with the welfare of the village and the harvest of crops and also to get rid of all evil happenings.

== Time of the festival ==
The festival does not have a specific time although it is usually observed after the end of rice harvest, or at the beginning of the Karbi New Year (February). The festival is usually celebrated either on 5 January or 5 February. Different villages may observe it at different time depending entirely on their convenience. Usually many urban region that doesn't dwell in agriculture celebrate it early on 5 January, and agricultural region usually celebrate it later on 5 February.

== Celebration ==
=== The rituals ===
The festival lasts for three days. All the villagers contributes in cash and kinds and donation are also collected from the neighbouring villages in order to meet the expenses of the rituals. The festival is divided into four major parts:

Sadi
In this process all the deities are invited.
Karkli
Here the deities are worshipped in two ways – Kibo-kaba, offering of meals to the deities and Koia-abida, offering of areca-nut and betel leaves to the deities. The entire man-folk take part in the festival. They gather in the particular site in the morning with all necessary items required to worship. The main task is performed by the Kurusar, the main priest. He is assisted by some other religious specialists, the village headman, an official of the Karbi Kingdom, the youth leader of the village and a few elderly villagers well versed in worshipping the deities. It is not mandatory to take bath before performing the rituals but they must be purified by sprinkling water with the leaves of the sacred basil. All the sacrifices are made in the names of the deities except for the deity Bamun, who is vegetarian. Then the thek-kere, the religious specialists predicts the future of the village at the heart and intestine of the sacrificed animals. At the end of the rituals a feast is organised.
Rongphu-Rongling-Kangthin
It is also called the Ajo-Rongker and performed at the night of the second day. In this part, the evil spirits are driven out from the lower to the upper part of the village by way of dancing. An altar is made at the end of the village road and a chicken is sacrificed in the name of Ajo-Angtarpi.
Langhe Rongker
This is the concluding part of the festival observed at the third day of the festival. It is performed near a ghat by making an altar and sacrificing a cock in the name of Arnam-teke, he tiger god, to prevent tigers from attacking.

==== The set-up of the site ====
10 earthen altars against all the deities are installed in the eastern side of the site where the festival is to be held. They are constructed in a row heading south-north direction and named after the deities. The shape of the altars are made in such a manner so that the respective gods can rest there comfortably. Although 12 deities are worshiped, only 10 altars are set up since Hemphu, and Rasinja are regarded as brothers and sister, Mukrang is the husband of Rasinja and they share a common altar. A gourd with tapering mouth full of the first made rice beer is placed on the altars in the name of the respective deity. Although except the gourd full of rice beer, nothing else is placed on the altars, however, two small branches of bamboo are erected on the altar of Ningding Sarpo, a few branches of Basil and a few bamboo sticks are erected on the altar of Murti and a branch of Fongrong (a kind of tree used for worshipping god) is placed on the altar of Arlok.

==== Deities worshipped ====
During this festival total 12 deities are worshipped. They are namely:

1. Longri sarpo: The presiding as well as the village-god of the host village. This deity is responsible for the welfare of the Longri (Kingdom or jurisdiction).
2. Hemphu: The supreme household god of the Karbis.
3. Mukrang: The second household god, next to the Hemphu.
4. Rasinja: The household goddess.
5. Bamun: The local vegetarian deity.
6. Ningding Sarpo: The god of Patience.
7. Rit-Anglong: The deity in-charge of agriculture.
8. Than: The local deity, living in jungle, who is responsible for protecting the crops and people from wild animals and insects etc.
9. Murti: The headless malevolent spirit who lives in a hole under the earth.
10. Arlock: The deity that lives in a land standing between two hills.
11. Kuthepi: The deity responsible for looking over Kuthepi territory.
12. Theng: The deity living in the jungle who cures diseases like flue, ache, headache, tooth-ache and other physical pains.

=== Feast ===
The whole village or at least one member from every house gather for feast after finishing the rituals.

=== Taboo observed ===
Taboo observed during the festival:

- Any agricultural activities is prohibited
- The female folk is not allowed to participate in the festival, but they are gathered for the feast at the village head house.
- No villager is allowed to leave the village.

=== Some Karbi words associated with the festival ===
- Duwan: Altar
- Horbong: A gourd with tapering mouth ( kind of Indonesian bottle gourd), for holding rice beer.
- Horso: first made rice beer offered to the deity
- Kurusar: The main priest
- Deuri, Barwa, Thek-kere: These are all religions specialists
- Burtaman: An official of the Karbi Kingdom
- Rong-A-sarthe: Village headman
- Riso Basa: Youth leader of the village
- Arnam-teke: The tiger god
- Aar: Jhum cultivation

== See also ==
- Assamese Culture
- Karbi Youth Festival
