= Timung =

Sub-clans of the Karbi community

Timung is one of the sub-clans (locally called Kur) of the Tungjang clan of Karbi community.

== Composition ==
The Tungjang (Timung) group is traditionally divided into 30 distinct clans. These clans are as follows

- Timung
- Timung Rongpi
- Timung Killing
- Timung Phura
- Phangcho
- Phangcho Juiti
- Phangcho Langteroi
- Phangcho Ingnar
- Phangcho Vojaru
- Pator
- Killing Miji
- Killing Nokbare
- Senar
- Senar Muchiki
- Senar Meji
- Tokbi Ronghang
- Tokbi Totiki
- Tokbi Chingthong
- Tokbi Dera
- Rongphar Senot
- Rongphar Phura
- Nokbare (Longthulu)
- Nongdu
- Nonglada
- Dera
- Singnar Pator
- Senot
- Chalut Senot
- Mu Chophi
- Tokbi Killing

== Residence ==
They mainly live in Karbi Anglong, and West Karbi Anglong districts of Assam state and other parts of Northeast India.
