= Teron =

Clan of the karbi people

Teron is one of the five clans of the Karbi people in Northeast India and Bangladesh. Sometimes pronounce as Toron in Dumra area of Karbi inhabitance and sometimes as Tron in Ri-Bhoi area of Meghalaya state. It is also known as Kronjang in verses, poetry or songs.
