= Howraghat =

Howraghat Hawar-Digathai
- Town
- Location in Assam, India Howraghat (India)
- Coordinates: 26°05′14″N 93°08′17″E
- Country: India
- State: Assam
- District: Karbi Anglong

Government
  - Body: Howraghat Town Committee

Population (2001)
  - Total: 46,590

Languages
  - Official: English, Assamese
  - Regional: Karbi, Dimasa
- Time zone: UTC+5:30 (IST)
- Postal code: 782481
- Vehicle registration: AS

Howraghat (IPA: ˈhɑʊrəˌgɑːt) is a town in the Karbi Anglong district of the Indian state of Assam. It is home to many indigenous communities mainly Karbi, Dimasa Kachari, Tiwa (Lalung) Kachari, Bodo Kachari, etc.

== Etymology ==
The name "Howraghat" came from Karbi words 'Hawar Kehat' meaning crossing border. The word became distorted later as Howraghat.

== Demographics ==
As of 2001 India census, Howraghat had a population of 95649. Males constitute 58% of the population and females 42%. Howraghat has an average literacy rate of 80%, higher than the national average of 59.5%: male literacy is 85%, and female literacy is 73%. In Howraghat, 11% of the population is under 6 years of age.

== Education ==
- Atur Kimi English School
- Howraghat College
- Howraghat Higher Secondary School
- Howraghat English Medium High School
- Howraghat Town Girls High School
- National English School
- Pan Engti ME School
- Srimanta Shankardeva Vidyalay
- Shankar dev shisu vidya Niketan
- Kidzee pre-school
- Clirso Global school

== Politics ==
Howraghat is part of Howraghat Assembly constituency under Assam Legislative Assembly, and Autonomous District (Lok Sabha constituency).

== See also ==
- Dokmoka
