= National Highway 329 (India) =

National highway in India

National Highway 329
- Map of the National Highway in red

Route information
- Length: 52 km (32 mi)

Major junctions
- East end: Manja
- West end: Lumding

Location
- Country: India
- States: Assam
- Primary destinations: Diphu

Highway system
- Roads in India; Expressways; National; State; Asian
← NH 29	→ NH 27

National Highway 329, commonly called NH 329 is a national highway in India. It is a spur road of National Highway 29. NH-329 traverses the state of Assam in India.

This highway in Assam runs between Karbi Anglong and Hojai district. It begin at Manja passing through Diphu and ends at Lumding. It has a total length of 52 km.

== Route ==
Manja - Diphu - Lumding.

== Junctions ==
Assam
NH 29 Terminal at Manja.
NH 329A at Diphu.
NH 27 Terminal near Lumding.

== See also ==
- List of national highways in India
- List of national highways in India by state
