= Marat Longri Wildlife Sanctuary =

Wildlife sanctuary in Assam, India

- IUCN category IV (habitat/species management area)
- Interactive map of Marat Longri Wildlife Sanctuary
- Location: Karbi Anglong district, Assam, India
- Area: 451 km^{2} (174 sq mi)
- Established: 2003

Marat Longri Wildlife Sanctuary is a wildlife sanctuary situated in the Karbi Anglong district in the Indian state of Assam.

== Description ==
The sanctuary was formed in 2003, spreading over an area of 451 km^{2} (174 sq mi). It hosts animals like the Asian elephant, the Hoolock gibbon, the Royal Bengal Tiger and the Himalayan Black Bear. It is an part of Dhansiri-Lungding Elephant Reserve.

An ISRO study in 2024 found that the sanctuary is facing a loss of its green cover. Land grabbing by encroachments is also another issue faced by the sanctuary. A study found that the sanctuary hosts about 91 species of wild edible plants, including 2 fern species, which are consumed by the tribal people living within the sanctuary borders.
