= National Highway 129A (India) =

National highway in India

National Highway 129A
- Map of the National Highway in red

Route information
- Length: 179 km (111 mi)

Major junctions
- North end: Dimapur
- South end: Maram

Location
- Country: India
- States: Manipur, Nagaland

Highway system
- Roads in India; Expressways; National; State; Asian
← NH 29	→ NH 2

National Highway 129A, commonly referred to as NH 129A is a national highway in India. It is a spur road of National Highway 29. NH-129A traverses the states of Manipur and Nagaland in India.

== Route ==
Nagaland

Dimapur, Razaphe Junction, Pimla Junction, Jaluki, Peren, Manipur border.

Manipur

Nagaland Border - Maram.

== Junctions ==
NH 29 Terminal near Dimapur.
NH 2 near Maram.

== See also ==
- List of national highways in India
- List of national highways in India by state
