= Karbi Anglong district =

District of Assam, India

Coordinates: 26°11′N 93°34′E

- District of Assam
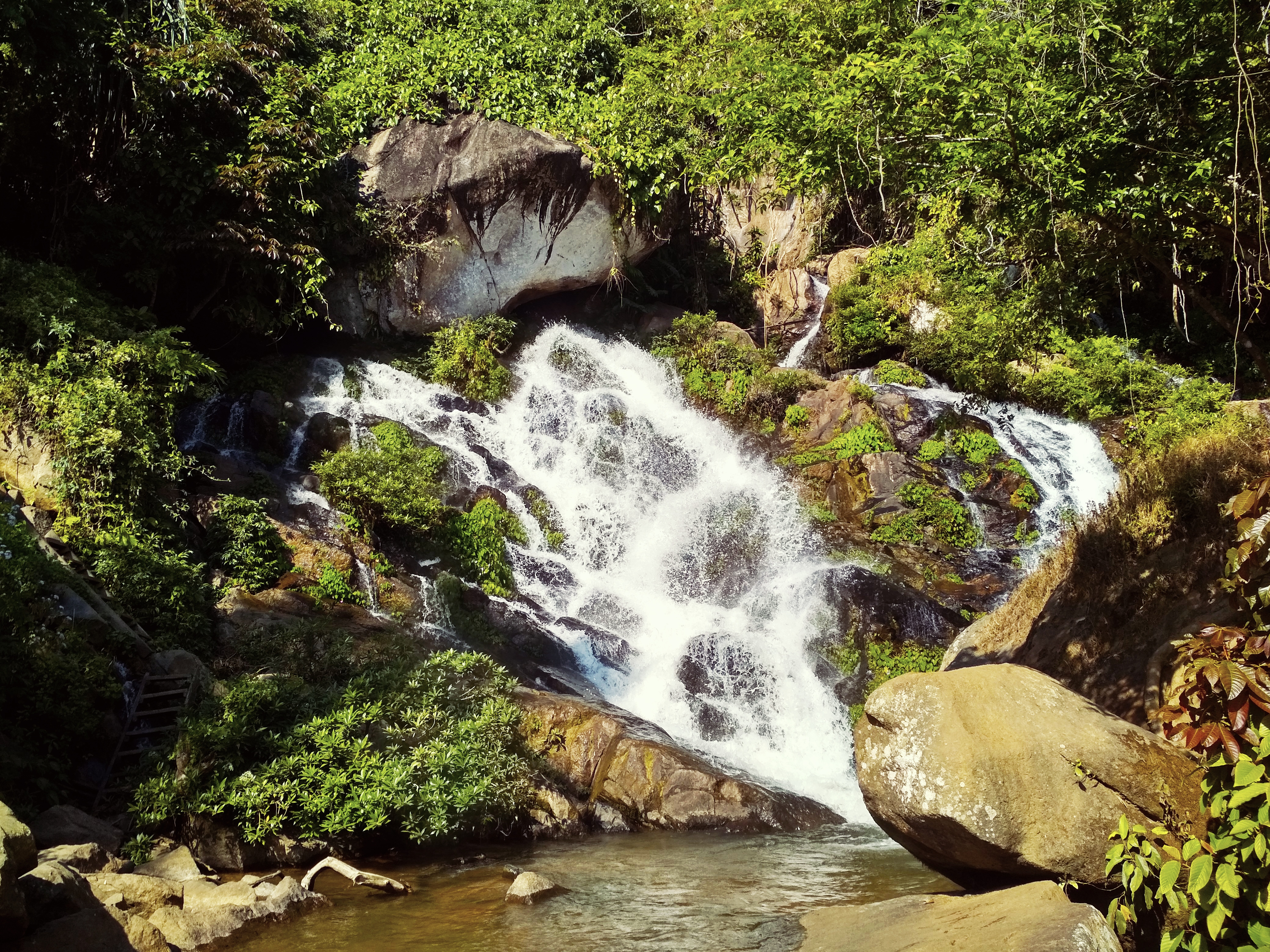
- Langkvoku waterfall near Manja

- Location in Assam
- Country: India
- State: Assam
- Division: Central Assam
- Created on: 2 February 1970
- Headquarters: Diphu

Government
  - Lok Sabha constituencies: Autonomous District (shared with Dima Hasao & West Karbi Anglong district)
  - Vidhan Sabha constituencies: Bokajan, Howraghat, Diphu

Area
  - Total: 10,434 km^{2} (4,029 sq mi)

Population (2011)
  - Total: 660,955
  - Density: 63.346/km^{2} (164.07/sq mi)

Demographics
  - Literacy: 96.52%
  - Sex ratio: 1753
- Time zone: UTC+05:30 (IST)
- Vehicle registration: AS-09-X-XXXX
- Major highways: NH-36, NH-39 (AH-1)
- Website: karbianglong.gov.in, karbianglong.co.in

Karbi Anglong district is an administrative unit in the Indian state of Assam. It is an autonomous district administered by the Karbi Anglong Autonomous Council (KAAC) according to the provisions of the Sixth Schedule of the constitution of India. The district headquarters is in Diphu.

== Etymology ==
"Karbi Anglong" is derived from the Karbi language. Karbi is the name of the indigenous tribe living in and around the region. The origin of the word Karbi is unknown. Anglong is a homonym in the Karbi language for hills and mountains. The term Karbi Anglong literally means "Karbi Hills".

== History ==
=== Pre independence ===
Prior to the British colonisation of Assam, the major hill tribes of Undivided Assam had their own separate "states" they lived in without much outside interference. They were not a part of any properly established external government or kingdom. Under the British rule with the Frontier Regulation Act of 1884, the Mikir Hills tract was made a part of the administrative district of Nowgong. (Note: Presently known as Nagaon district) Till then, there was no administrative boundary of the erstwhile Mikir Hills or present-day districts of Karbi Anglong and West Karbi Anglong. In 1893, a part of the tract was put under the Sivsagar (Note: Present day Golaghat district.) district.

In 1935, Mikir Hills was declared as one of the "backward tracts" under article 52A(2) of the Government of India Act, 1919. These "backward tracts" were the tribal areas for whose administration the Sixth Schedule of the Indian constitution was later enacted. Under the Government of India Act, 1935, the Mikir Hills tract was classified under "Partially Excluded Areas". These areas were not directly controlled by the laws made in the province or the federal government and while the power of administration was vested in the council of ministers. However, it was subject to the governor exercising his individual judgement.

=== Post independence ===
On 17 November 1951, the now defunct United Mikir Hills and North Cachar Hills district was created by combining some parts of the present day districts of Golaghat, Nagaon, Cachar, and United Khasi Hills and Jaintia Hills district of present-day Meghalaya.

This was followed by the bifurcation of the erstwhile district of United Mikir and North Cachar Hills into two separate districts - Mikir Hills and North Cachar Hills district on 2 February 1970. The Mikir Hills district was later officially renamed to Karbi Anglong district on 14 October 1976.

Karbi Anglong district in Assam has been plagued by several ethnic conflicts in recent years. The most notable one was the Karbi-Kuki conflict that erupted in 2003 and continued into 2004, resulting in the deaths of at least 85 people, mostly men, at the hands of militant groups like the Kuki Revolutionary Army (KRA) and the anti-talks faction of the United Peoples' Democratic Solidarity (UPDS). The conflict was marked by retaliatory attacks, with the KRA killing 39 Karbi tribals in March 2004 in the highest single-day civilian casualty in Assam. The underlying issues were the Kuki community's demand for recognition as indigenous and fear of ethnic cleansing, while the Karbi community wanted to control resources and stop Kuki migration.

In 2016, the district was further divided into two new districts. The entire area under the Hamren Civill sub-division of the Karbi Anglong district was carved out to form a new district, West Karbi Anglong with Hamren as its headquarter.

== Politics ==
=== Aspiration for statehood ===
Following British colonisation, the Government of India Act, 1935, categorised the Mikir Hills as "Partially Excluded Areas". These areas were not directly controlled by the laws of the provincial and federal government and were administered by a council of ministers but was subject to the Governor exerting their individual judgement.

In 1940, political leaders such as Semsonsing Ingti, Khorsing Terang and Seng Bey in a memorandum to the Assam Governor, Sir Robert Neil Reid, advocated for a separate hill district for Mikirs. To further advance their cause, a socio-political organisation called the Karbi-A-Dorbar was formed in 1946.

Former M.P. Dr. Jayanta Rongpi representing both Karbi Anglong & NC Hills in the Parliament during his tenure.

In 1960, the government of Assam passed the Assam Official Language Act, 1960 declaring Assamese as the official language of the state. In 1972, the Gauhati University announced that the medium of instruction and examination under its colleges would be changed from English to Assamese. In response to this, a meeting was held on 31 May 1973, under the leadership of the Chief Executive Member at that time. During this meeting, they adopted the Roman Script for Karbi literary works and established the Script Implementation Committee. In a rally held by the committee on 19 December 1973, several students were injured and leaders were arrested in a retaliation by the state police force.

These developments contributed to calls for an Autonomous State within Assam. The then Chief Minister Prafulla Himanta and Home Minister Bhrigu Phukan opposed these demands stating concerns that it could fragment the state further.

=== Sixth Schedule ===
The Sixth Schedule under Article 244(2) and 275(1) contains provisions for the administration of tribal areas in the states of Assam, Meghalaya, Tripura and Mizoram. The provisions of the Sixth Schedule are regarded as a mini-constitution within the constitution. In autonomous regions, any act enacted by the State legislature or any act of the Parliament in respect of the subjects and powers vested with the district council shall not be applicable within the territorial jurisdiction of the district council unless the authority of such a council decides to accept them in its entirety or with exceptions and modifications. The Sixth schedule of the Indian constitution empowers the Governor to make rules for the first constitution of District Councils and Regional Councils in consultation with the existing tribal Councils or other representative tribal organisations within the autonomous districts or regions concerned.

=== Local rules and membership eligibility ===
There are different internal rules for different Autonomous District Councils (ADCs). Under the Karbi Anglong Autonomous Council, the right of access to traditional lands and length of stay in the region are regarded as "qualifying criteria" for being included in the voters' list for the ADCs. According to "The Assam Autonomous Districts (Constitution of District Councils) Rules, 1951", to qualify for a membership in the council, the person must be a citizen of India, not younger than 25 years and be eligible to vote in the election of the members of the district council of that autonomous district.

=== Legal challenges and controversies ===
In 2017, a Public Interest Litigation (PIL/9/2017) titled Ratan Terang and 17 Ors Vs.The State of Assam and 8 Ors., was filed in the Gauhati High Court where the petitioners brought to the attention of the court that the elections in the Election District Council are being conducted under the Rules of 1951 and under Rule 128 (4)(b) of the said rules, individuals who are not members of the Scheduled Tribes are included in the electoral rolls of the district council. They argued that the rules of 1951 had lapsed after the first constitution of the district council and that any further action taken pursuant to the said rules was invalid. The Gauhati High Court in its judgement directed the council to frame the rules for conducting the election in exercise of its power under paragraph 2(7) of the Sixth Schedule within a period of 6 months of the order.

In 2018, a PIL was filed to the Gauhati High court and Diphu Judicial Court arguing that no non-Scheduled Tribe person could contest in the Sixth Schedule council election. Three non-tribal MACs of the Karbi Anglong Autonomos Council were summoned by the Diphu Judicial Court for a hearing.

On 12 May 2022, the KAAC announced that elections would be held on 8 June 2022, leading to protests against the decision as the rules for conducting the elections to the council was not framed yet. Despite this, the elections were held on 8 June leading to reports of violence on the day of the election.

== Geography ==
=== Topography ===
The districts plateau are an extension of the Indian Plate (The Peninsular Block) in the Northeast India. This area receives maximum rainfall from the Southwest summer Monsoon from June through September. Numerous rivers and tributaries flow in these districts such as the Dhansiri, Longnit, Jamuna, Kolioni and Nambor. The district is bounded by Golaghat district on the east and on the north, Meghalaya state and Morigaon district on the west, Nagaon and Dima Hasao district and Nagaland state on the south. The district is located between 25º 33′ and 26º 35′ North latitude and from 92º 10′ to 93º 50′ East longitude.

=== Flora and fauna ===
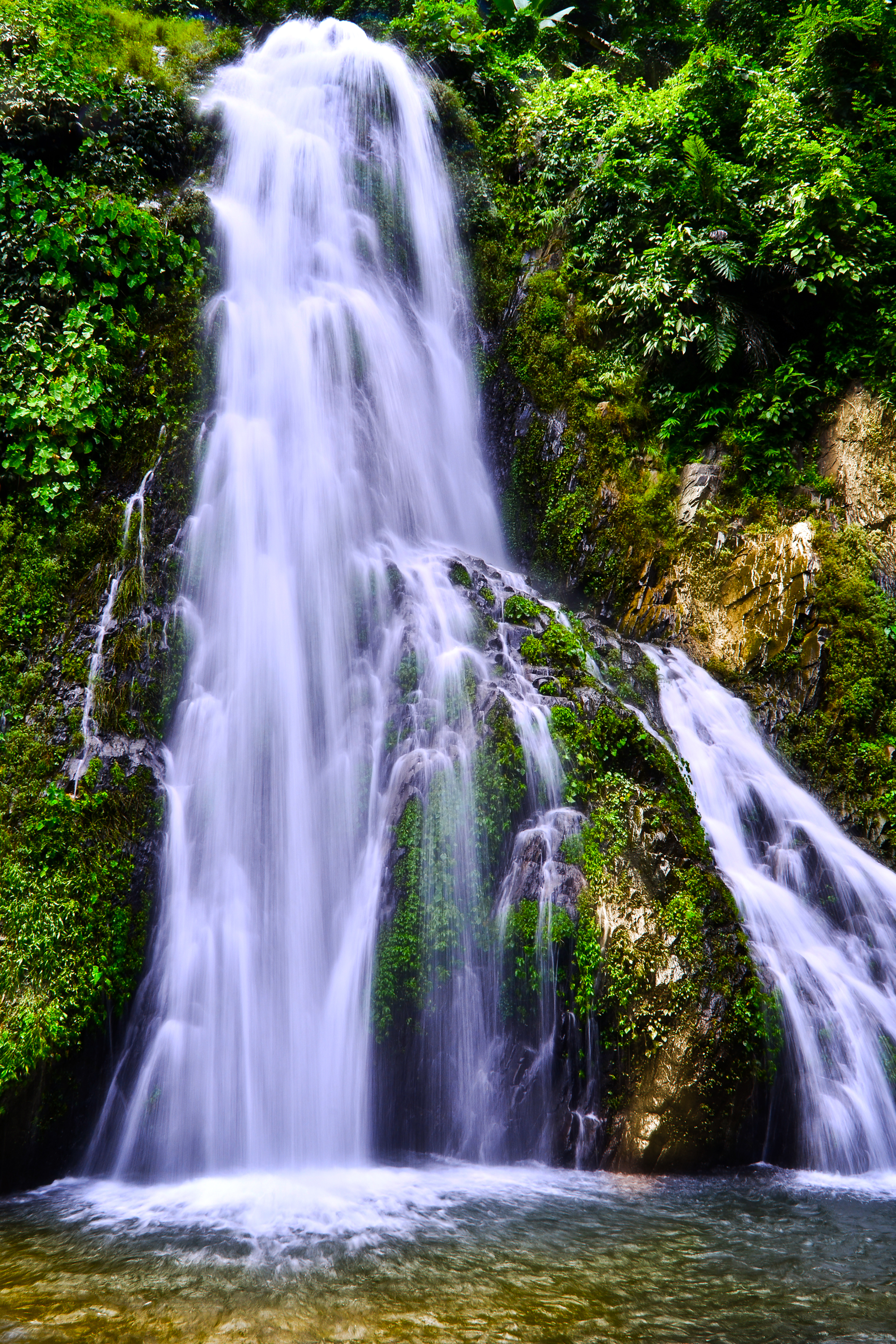
The Kangthi Langso waterfall, situated in Kangthi Village, approximate 12 kilometers away from Dengaon in Karbi Anglong district of Assam in India.

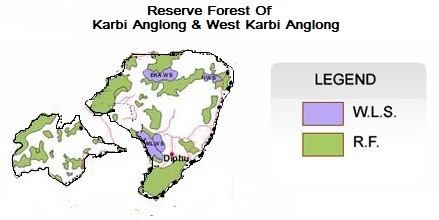
Reserve Forests and Wildlife Sanctuaries map of Karbi Anglong.

About 40% of Karbi Anglong is covered with forest. According to MSME-Development Institute, Diphu, the important forest types found in Karbi Anglong District are: Moist semi-evergreen forests, Moist Mixed Deciduous forests, Riverain Type and Miscellaneous type with scattered pure or mixed patches of bamboos. These forest areas are natural museums of living giant trees, a treasure house of rare, endemic and endangered species, a dispensary of medicinal plants, a garden for Botanists, a gene bank for economically important organisms, a paradise for nature lovers and a laboratory for environmentalists. Threatened species in the area include Asian elephant, Bengal tiger, Clouded leopard and Leopard, Hoolock gibbon, Pangolin, Porcupine Slow loris etc. The district includes five wildlife sanctuaries, two elephant reserves (Dhansiri – Lumding and Kaziranga – Karbi Anglong) and 17 District Council Reserve Forests (DCRFs). In 1952, Karbi Anglong district became home to the Garampani Wildlife Sanctuary, which has an area of 6 km^{2} (2.3 mi^{2}). Other four Wildlife Sanctuaries are East Karbi-Anglong Wildlife Sanctuary, Marat Longri Wildlife Sanctuary, Nambor Wildlife Sanctuary and North Karbi-Anglong Wildlife Sanctuary. However, the forests and wildlife of these districts continue to face threats from deforestation and human activities, some of them illegal. Illegal minings is an immense concern as it very much contributes to ecological disturbance.

=== Climate ===
Due to the variation in the topography of this hill zone, different parts of the district experiences different climates. The winter season commences from October and continues till February. During the summer season, there is a significant rise in both humidity and warmth. The temperature ranges from 6-12° in winter and 23-32° in summer. The average rainfall is about 2416 mm.

== Administration ==
The district is under the administration of Karbi Anglong Autonomous Council. Diphu is the district headquarter, as well administrative headquarters of the same. The CEM of Karbi Anglong Autonomous Council is the chairperson and chief executive of the council and district respectively, supported by twenty six other Executive Members of the council. The Principal Secretary, Karbi Anglong Autonomous Council is the administrative head of the districts. The Deputy Commissioners is responsible for maintenance of Law and Order, Administration of Justice. Other important town of the districts is Bokajan. As per 2011 census, Total number of villages in the district is 2073 with combined 11 Development Blocks to look after the development activities in the district.

=== Constituency ===
There are three Vidhan Sabha constituencies in the district, namely Bokajan, Howraghat and Diphu. All are part of 3 S.T. Autonomous District Lok Sabha constituency of Assam designated for scheduled tribes.

== Economy ==
In 2006, the Indian government named Karbi Anglong one of the country's 250 most backward districts (out of a total of 640). It is one of the eleven districts in Assam currently receiving funds from the Backward Regions Grant Fund Programme (BRGFP).

The GDP of the district was 2,198.39 crore (13th among Districts of Assam) based at constant price (2004–2005) for year 2009–10. Agriculture is the main source of income for the people along with Horticulture, Livestock, Plantation, Sericulture, Weaving, etc. Tribals are generally self-sufficient. They mostly rely on wild vegetables found in hills both for domestic consumption and commercial purpose.

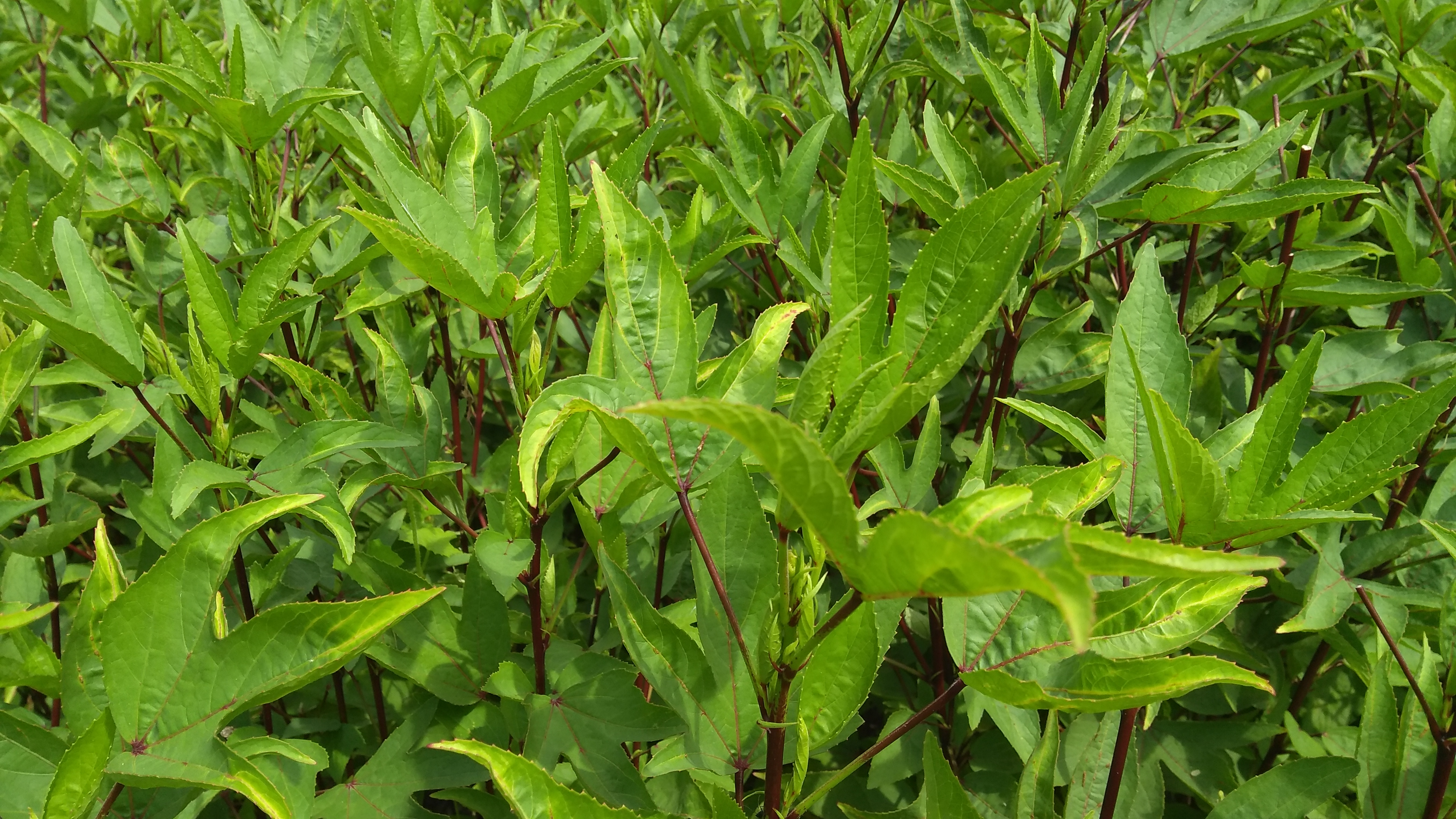
Roselle (plant) (English)/Hanserong (local) is a common plant grown in almost every tribal household. Both its leaf & seed bud are consumed.

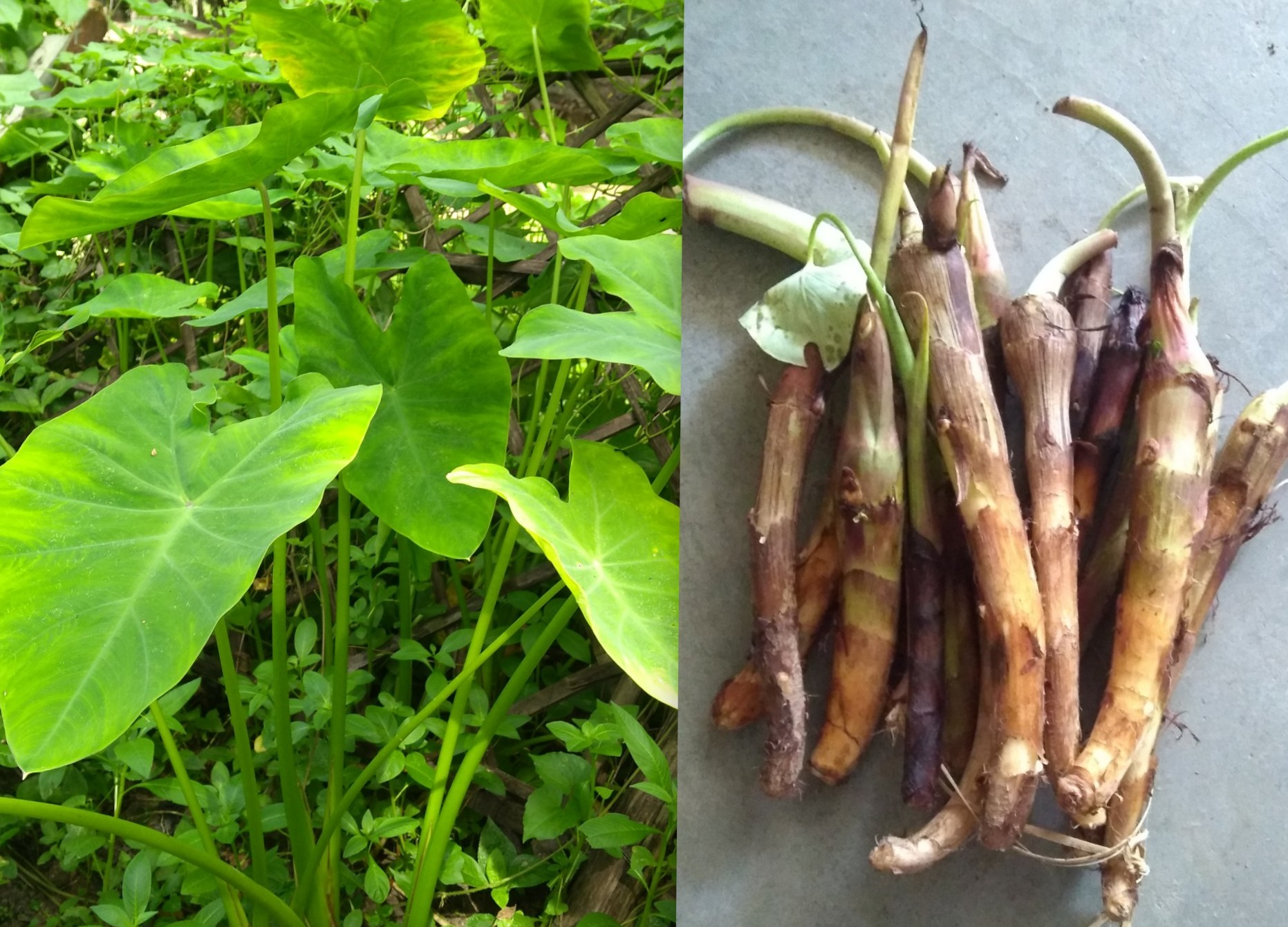
Colocasia or Henru (left) and its root or Dongdar (right) are consumed entirely.

=== Ginger ===
Karbi Anglong ginger has been accorded geographical indication (GI) status by the GI Registry of India. Karbi Anglong ginger's production, cultivated by around 10,000 farmers, averages 30,000 tonnes annually.

=== Rubber ===
in 2017–18 with a total area of 8,589.85 hectare and production of 2,925 million tonnes (third among inter districts of Assam) it generated 26,800 employments.

=== Tea ===
As per the Statistical Hand Book Assam, 2018 the district has 1,590 tea growers registered with Tea Board of India with total area of 2,488.21 hectares. In 2017, the district's tea production was 4.59 million kg and stood at No.12 among other districts of Assam.

The region also produces significant numbers of Areca nut, Baccaurea ramiflora, Beans, Jackfruit, Maize, Orange (fruit), Peach, Pineapple, Potato and Sweet potato, Plum, Sugarcane, Tapioca, Turmeric, etc. One of CCI working factory (out of three) called Bokajan Cement Factory is located in Bokajan. Its product is exported to the whole country.

=== Potentiality for development ===
The district is rich in mineral resources. It has Feldspar and Limestone reserves. According to the Ministry of Micro, Small and Medium Enterprises, Karbi Anglong has reserve Coal of 1.3 m. tonnes, Granite of 30 m. cum and Kaolinite of 0.7 m. tonnes.

== Demographics ==
=== Population ===
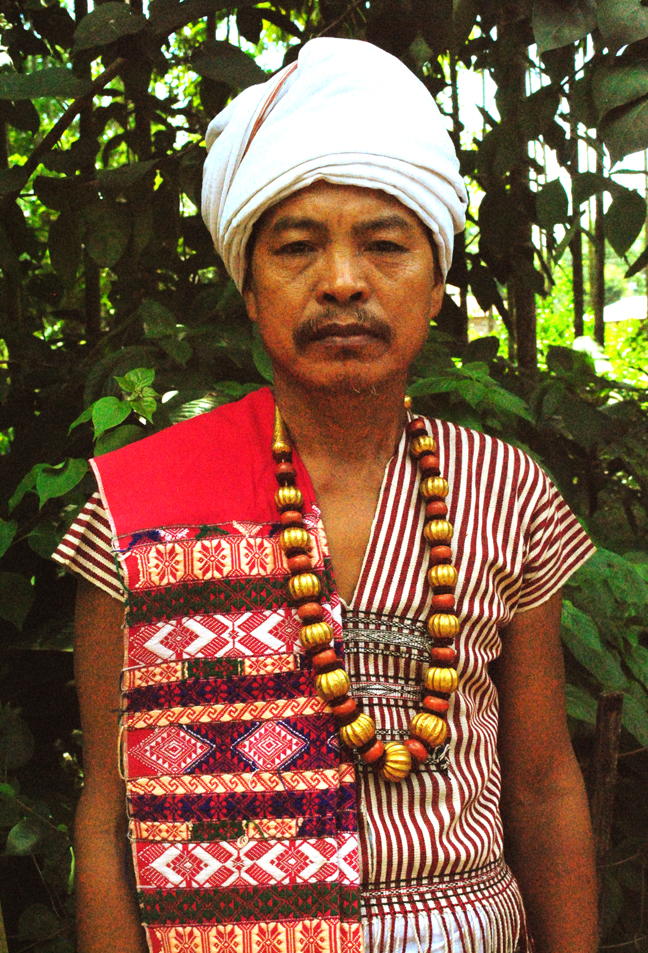
A Karbi elder in traditional attire, wearing a Poho (white turban), a choi-hongthor (woven jacket), a lek paikom (gold-plated necklace) and another poho on his right shoulder

According to the 2011 census, Karbi Anglong District has a population of 965,280, This gives it a ranking of 451st in India (out of a total of 640). The district has a population density of 93 inhabitants per square kilometre (240/sq mi) . Its population growth rate over the decade 2001-2011 was 17.58%. Karbi Anglong has a sex ratio of 951 females for every 1000 males, and a literacy rate of 74%, with Male and Female constituting 82% and 65% respectively. The residual district has a population of 660,955. Karbi Anglong has a sex ratio of 950 females per 1000 males, of which 95,103 (14.39%) live in urban areas. Scheduled Castes and Scheduled Tribes are 33,523 (5.07%) and 345,220 (52.23%) of the population respectively.

=== Religion ===
Religions in Karbi Anglong district (2011)
Religion	Percent
Hinduism	80.36%
Christianity	15.32%
Islam	2.88%
Buddhism	0.87%
Other or not stated	1.00%
Excludes Donka revenue circle

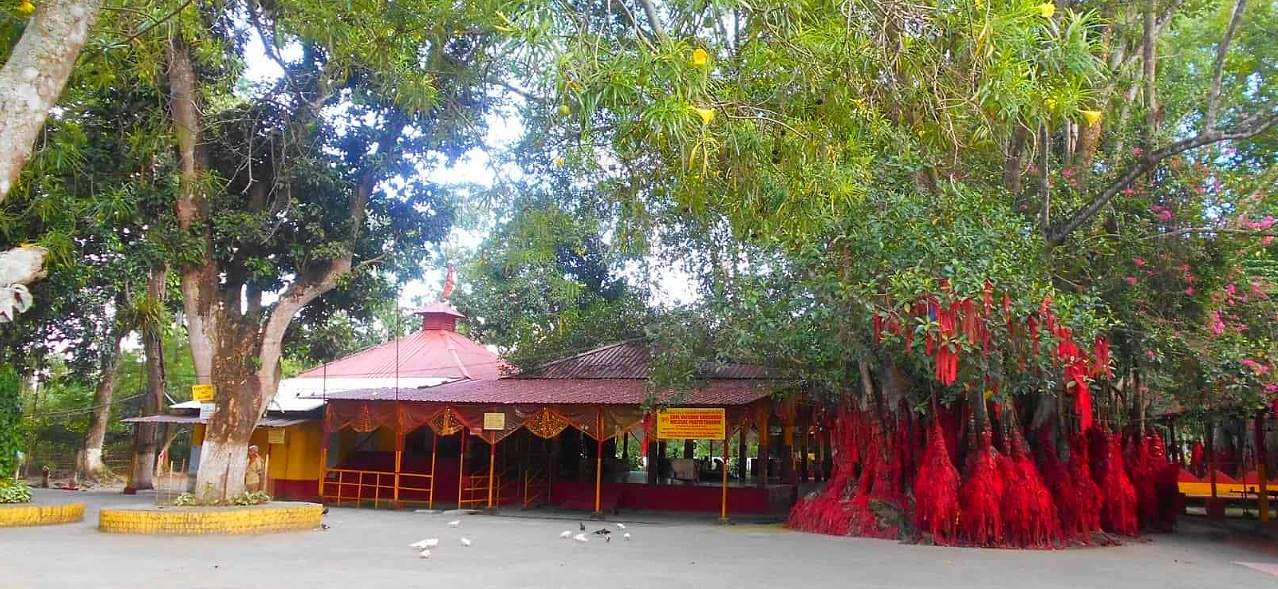
Deopani Durga temple in Karbi Anglong district

Those practicing are Hinduism are 531,167 (80.36%) of the population. Christianity is the second largest religion comprising 101,251 (15.32%) of the population. Muslims are 19,057 (2.88%) while Buddhists are 5,767 (0.87%) of the population. A significant population of Hindus adhere to Lokhimon, a religious movement originating among the Karbi people influenced by Vaishnavism.

=== Languages ===
Languages of Karbi Anglong district (2011)
1. Karbi (43.9%)
2. Bengali (13.0%)
3. Assamese (9.03%)
4. Boro Kachari (6.04%)
5. Nepali (4.67%)
6. Hindi (3.70%)
7. Dimasa Kachari (2.65%)
8. Bhojpuri (2.17%)
9. Sadri (1.90%)
10. Kuki (1.39%)
11. Garo Kachari (1.22%)
12. Others (10.3%)

At the time of the 2011 census, 43.94% of the population spoke Karbi, 13.02% Bengali, 9.03% Assamese, 6.04% Boro Kachari, 4.67% Nepali, 3.70% Hindi, 2.65% Dimasa Kachari, 2.17% Bhojpuri, 1.90% Sadri, 1.39% Kuki and 1.22% Garo as their first language.

=== Culture ===
While the Karbis are the majority, there also exist numerous other ethnic groups like Tiwa, and Kuki tribes like Thadou and Hmar, found scattered throughout the district. All these ethnicities represent different and unique identities, customs and traditions, clothing, food and religions of their own. However, these tribes share common practices like utilizing bamboo as food (bamboo shoot) and for construction of their houses, they craft utensils from wood, cultivate cotton for spinning and practiced jhum cultivation. They also don't practice dowries and clothing manufacture is counted among their traditional practices.

Karbi Youth Festival is an annual festival celebrated by the Karbi people of Assam along with other tribals to propagate and display their rich culture and traditions in one platform. It is celebrated between 15 and 19 February of every year in Taralangso, Diphu, Karbi Anglong District. It is locally called Karbi Riso-Nimso Rong Aje.

=== Demographics issues ===
In 1971 Census of India, the Tribal population was at 65%, as of 2011, it stand at 56.3% with large numbers of illegal influx and encroachment from outside causing disturbance to both natural landscape & economic opportunities. Illegal issuance of land patta is also the major concern for the Indigenous tribal communities. The Karbi Anglong Autonomous Council, the Land Revenue and the Forest department of Karbi Anglong aided by Police and Executive Magistrate on 5 March 2019 demolished and evicted over 600 illegal structures and infiltrators built in Lankaijan Reserve Forest bordering Hojai district. On 31 August, 10:00 am (Indian Standard Time) the much awaited National Register of Citizens of India (Assam) was declared. 19,06,657 were excluded out of 3.11 Crore people from all over Assam. According to many news reports, both from Karbi Anglong (10th position) & West Karbi Anglong district (7th position) 14.31% & 15.47% of people were excluded from these respective areas.

== Tourism ==
=== Places of interest ===
A hilly district of Assam, Karbi Anglong is still somewhat unknown to the tourist in spite of its natural green forest and hills. Some reasons are poor connectivity, infrastructure. Several places local origin name have been renamed by outsiders. Visitors frequent littering openly have caused serious threat to these places.

Diphu
It is a busy town located on a hill. There are tourist attractions in and around the town.
Taralangso
It host a cultural museum.
Akashi Ganga
15 km away from Dokmoka. A stream of water flows down from the high hill. In front of it, there is a Siva temple.
Dikrut Waterfall (also called Paklongkam)
It's a waterfall located on the mountain. Outsiders knows it by the name of Bhelughat.
Garampani (also called Langkar-om)
Garampani Wildlife Sanctuary which is home of hoolock gibbon and golden langur. There is hot water spring in here near the National Highway-29 (also NH37).
Kaipholangso
in Dolamara vicinity under No. 26 Duarbagori MAC Constituency in Karbi Anglong and famous for its scenic beauty and bordering the enchanting hills. Outsiders knows it as Kakochang falls.
Kangthi Langso Waterfall
It's a waterfall located in Kangthi village, around 12 km from Den Arong (Dengaon).
Longsokangthu (also called Siloni)
It is a picnic spot on the bank of a river, surrounded by hills and greenery.
Silbheta (also called Arlong-Ru-pat)
It is a picnic spot located at a distance of 37 km from Diphu. The place surrounded by rain forests. A nature built stone bridge (dyke) with a waterfall is the main attraction of this place.
Recreation Park
Recreation Park is a Government run Recreational cum Medicinal garden. It is a place of attraction for the tourists.
Langvoku Waterfall
Langvoku waterfall is 10km away from Manja (town) in Karbi Anglong (Assam). This place undoubtedly beautiful with its fountains. The place is located in Manja-Dilai area of the district.
Tokolangso Waterfall
Tokolangso waterfall is on a hilly spot. The water falls down straight from the hilltop. The water is very cold and crystal clear in appearance. The place is located in Balipathar, 14km away from Bokajan.

== Education ==
Karbi Anglong's major educational institutions are:

=== Universities ===
Assam University, Diphu Campus
Located in hilly terrain spreading over 273 bighas allotted by Karbi Anglong Autonomous District Council authority. It is about 8km westward from Diphu on NH-329A, Diphu-Lumding road. The campus is a pioneering higher-level study centre in this remote eastern part of the country. The Campus offers different Post-Graduate courses and research facilities.

=== Medical Colleges ===
Diphu Medical College and Hospital

=== Colleges ===
The district has many well established colleges. Among them, Diphu Government College, is the only NAAC accredited government higher educational institution in the district. Other notably colleges are Diphu Law College; Don Bosco Junior College, Diphu; Eastern Karbi Anglong College, Sarihajan; and Thong Nokbe College, Dokmoka.

=== Technical institutes ===
- Diphu polytechnic
- Indian Technical Institute [ITI]

=== Schools ===
Government's schools in the district follow the State, as well Central curriculum. The management of the schools in the district falls under three categories: government, private, and missionary. Some of the well known schools are: Don Bosco Higher Secondary School, Diphu; Badan Memorial Higher Secondary School, Diphu; Diphu Govt. Boys Higher Secondary School, Diphu; Diphu Govt. Girls High School, Diphu; Howraghat Higher Secondary School, Howraghat; Jawahar Navodaya Vidyalaya, Diphu; Kendriya Vidyalaya, Diphu & Bokajan; Kidzee, Diphu; Vidhya Sagar High School, Bokajan; Krist Jyoti School, Dokmoka; Mount Calvary English High School, Diphu; Aturkimi Academy, Diphu and Presbyterian Mission High School, Diphu.

== Media ==
=== Newspaper ===
The Arleng Daily, a Karbi daily founded in 2004, is a tabloid format newspaper that heralded a new beginning for Karbi newspaper. Thekar, another Karbi daily, is the first RNI Registered Karbi newspaper. Since then, there are several dailies in Karbi language. In the year of 2005–06, a Hindi newspaper Jana Prahari was launched from Baguliaghat, a small town in Karbi Anglong. 'Hill Observer' is an English daily newspaper published from Diphu. The Drongo Express, an English daily, is published from Diphu, Karbi Anglong. The Hills Times, started publication from 2000, is the most widely circulated English daily published from Diphu and is printed in Guwahati.

=== Television ===
- Doordarshan TV relay centre, Diphu
- KAT News (Cable Channel), Diphu
- Karbi Anglong Live (Cable Channel), Hamren, West Karbi Anglong
- KaCOM (Cable Channel) not in function since 2015, Bokajan

=== Radio ===
- All India Radio, Diphu

== Transportation ==
=== Road ===
The district is connected to other place by road though NH-29, NH-129, and NH-329.

=== Railway ===
Bokajan and Diphu railway station are the main railway station in the district.

== Notable towns ==
- Amlakhi
- Bokajan
- Bokulia
- Diphu
- Dokmoka
- Howraghat
- Manja

== Notable people ==
- Joyram Engleng
- Biren Sing Engti
- Semsonsing Ingti, founder of Karbi Anglong district (the then Mikir Hills).
- Jayanta Rongpi
- Sameer Tanti, Sahitya Akademi Award for the Book Foringbure Bator Kotha Jane
- Prof. Rongbong Terang, Padmashree awardee.

== See also ==
- List of districts of Assam
