= Amlakhi =

- town
- Location in Assam, India Amlakhi (India)
- Coordinates: 25°58′0″N 93°30′0″E
- Country: India
- State: Assam
- District: Karbi Anglong
- Elevation: 150 m (490 ft)

Languages
  - Official: Hindi, English, Assamese
- Time zone: UTC+5:30 (IST)
- Vehicle registration: AS
- Coastline: 0 kilometres (0 mi)

Amlakhi is a town in Karbi Anglong district, Assam, India.

== Geography ==
It is located at an elevation of 150 m above MSL.

== Location ==
Nearest railway station is at Diphu and the nearest airport is Dimapur Airport.

== Places of interest ==
Amlakhi is close to Barpathar, an archeological site where the remains of an 8th-century temple made of square bricks and a stone inscription of Brahmi characters from 5th century were excavated.
