= Bakulia =

Bakalia Volongkom aji
- town
- Location in Assam, India Bakalia (India)
- Coordinates: 26°5′0″N 93°12′0″E
- Country: India
- State: Assam
- District: Karbi Anglong

Government
  - Type: Democracy
  - Body: Bakalia Town Committee
- Elevation: 84 m (276 ft)

Languages Karbi, Assamese
  - Official: Karbi, English, Dimasa
- Time zone: UTC+5:30 (IST)
- Postal code: 782482
- Vehicle registration: AS-09-

Bakalia is a town in Karbi Anglong district, Assam, India.

== Geography ==
It is located at an elevation of 84 m above MSL.

== Location ==
Bakalia is connected by National Highway 36 to Nagaon and Dimapur. Nearest airport is Dimapur Airport. Guwahati is 200 km from here. The district headquarters is located at Diphu, 55 km away. Couple of buses ply from [Guwahati] to Diphu every day. Bakalia is situated on the NH 36 in the midway between Doboka and Dimapur.
