= National Highway 129 (India) =

National highway in India

National Highway 129
- Map of National Highway 129 in red

Route information
- Part of AH1 AH2

Major junctions
- From: Numaligarh
- To: Dimapur

Location
- Country: India
- States: Assam, Nagaland

Highway system
- Roads in India; Expressways; National; State; Asian
← NH 29	→ NH 715

National Highway 129 is a national highway of India. It starts at Numaligarh, Assam and ends at Dimapur, Nagaland where it joins with NH29. It is a major communication road between the Assam and Nagaland.It goes through The Nambor reserved forest. It is a part of AH 1 and AH 2 Asian Highway network.
