= Karbi Youth Festival =

Annual ethnic festival in Assam, India

Karbi Youth Festival Karbi Riso-Nimso Rong Aje
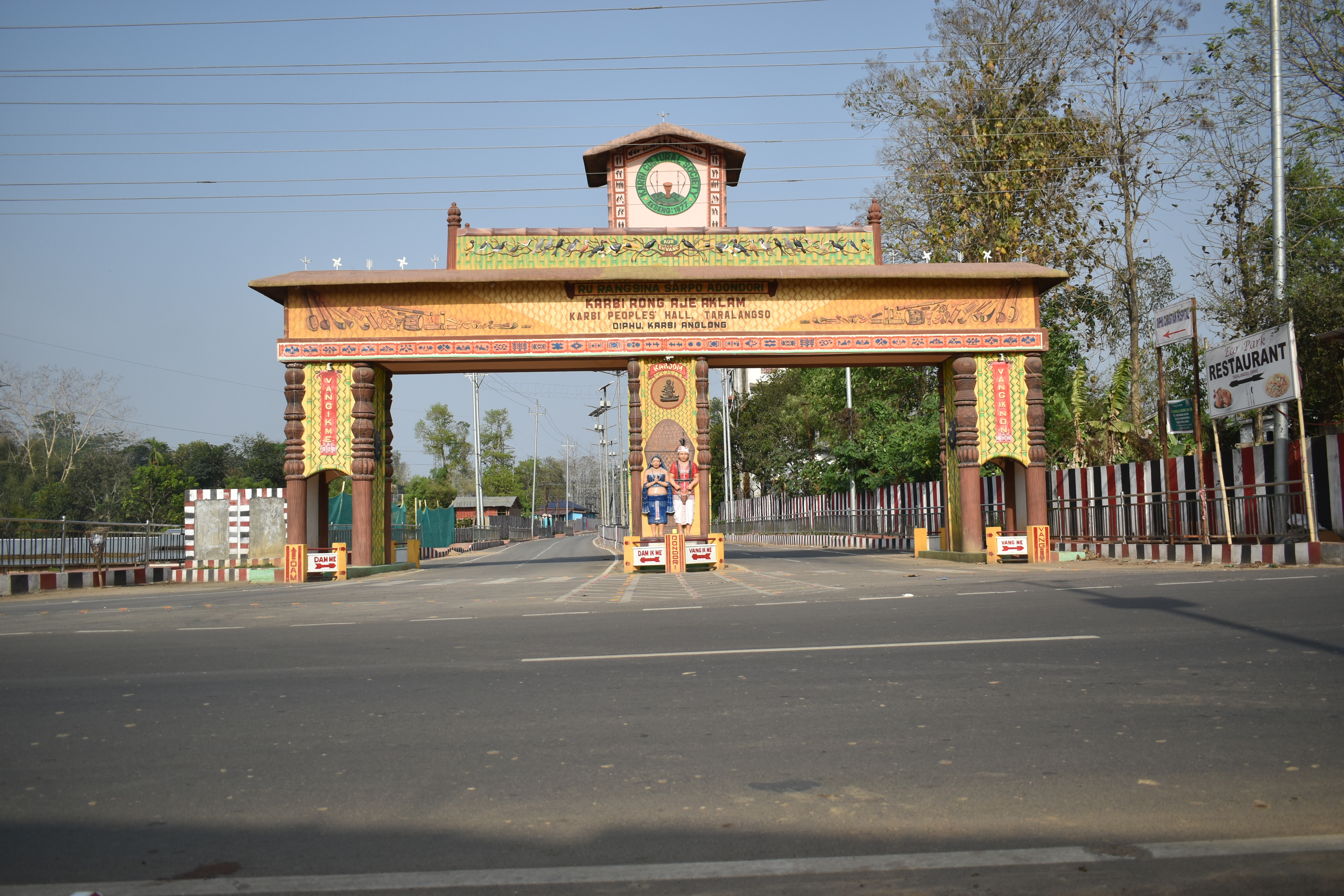
- Karbi Youth Festival Entry Gate
- Status: Active
- Genre: Folk, Musics Festivals.
- Begins: 15 February 2027
- Ends: 19 February 2027
- Frequency: Annually
- Venue: Karbi People Hall, Taralangso
- Locations: Diphu, Karbi Anglong, Assam
- Coordinates: 25.876°N 93.423°E
- Country: India
- Founded: 27 December 1974; 51 years ago
- Founder: Under leadership of Roy Inghi, with Late Janasing Terang, Lunse Timung, Lawrence Teron etc.
- Previous event: 2026
- Next event: 2027
- Participants: ~5000
- Attendance: ~1,50,000 each day
- Area: ~672 acre (2.7 KM^{2} (currently expanding)
- Major events: Contest in Singing & Dancing (Traditional & Modern form), Pageant, Traditional games, Fairs, Musics Festivals, Exhibitions. etc.
- Patron: KAAC
- Organiser: Karbi Cultural Society
- Sponsors: Public donation, KAAC
- Website: Karbi Youth Festival
- karbiyouthfestival.com

Karbi Youth Festival is an annual festival celebrated by the Karbi People living in East and West Karbi Anglong district and other districts in the Northeast Indian state of Assam, with occasional participation from other tribes and states of Northeastern India. It is considered the oldest ethnic festival in India. It is organised by Karbi Cultural Society (KCS). It is locally known as "Karbi Riso-Nimso Rong Aje".

== History ==
In 1974, the first edition of the festival was held at Diphu Club, Diphu. Its aim were to preserve the dying culture and traditional attires and folk songs and dances of Karbi tribal. The event was formed by a group of people led by Roy Inghi, with Late Janasing Terang, Lunse Timung, Lawrence Teron, and others. In 1977, Karbi Cultural Society (KCS) was formed in response to management of the festival, and as an entity to preserve, look after the cultural and traditions of Karbis.

Historically, the festival was celebrated in and around the district of Karbi Anglong and West Karbi Anglong. Moving from one place to another place, each year, to rise awareness for preservation of tribal culture and traditions. There was no specific month and date, nor periodic. It was held twice in the year 1985, January and December (eleven months apart), and none in the year 1977 (thirteen months apart). Since 1994, the event has permanently shifted to Taralangso, Diphu.

== Taralangso ==
Since 1994, Taralangso, also called Karbi People Hall (KPH), has been hosting the annual events of Karbi Youth Festival (from 20th edition). The location now has an Cultural museum, 4 Open stages platform, Indoor stage hall, Artisan village, 3 Helipad, Inspection Bungalow (IB), Guest House, Eco-Park, a Garden, and 2 playground, beside 3 pond, parking space, KCS office, and quarters.

== Celebration ==
=== Main festival ===
The main event is held/celebrated on 15–19 February of every year in Karbi Peoples Hall (KPH), Taralangso situated in Diphu town in Karbi Anglong district of the Indian state of Assam.

15 February
The first day is a ceremonial day. Opening of the festival, arrivals and welcoming of participants and contestants.

16 February
Start of events. Contest in various traditional game, theme etc. ie.- oral recitation.

17 February

18 February
Pageant, Strongmen, Rap battle etc.

19 February
Closing events, Music festival etc.

Concurrently, various traditional songs, dances competitions take place at four open stages during the length of the festival.

=== Zonal festivals ===
Smaller festivals called Zonal Karbi Youth Festival (ZKYF) are celebrated in their respective regions, during late autumn, pre-harvesting season of rice, before coming together for main cultural events cum yearly festival at Taralangso, Diphu. The winner of each zone get to compete in the yearly main event. Zonal festivals was conceived around the time when the main festival was permanently settled at now Taralangso. Recently, these festivals are held alongside Durga Puja to minimise local holidays. As of December 2025, it has completed its 33 edition.

== Gallery ==
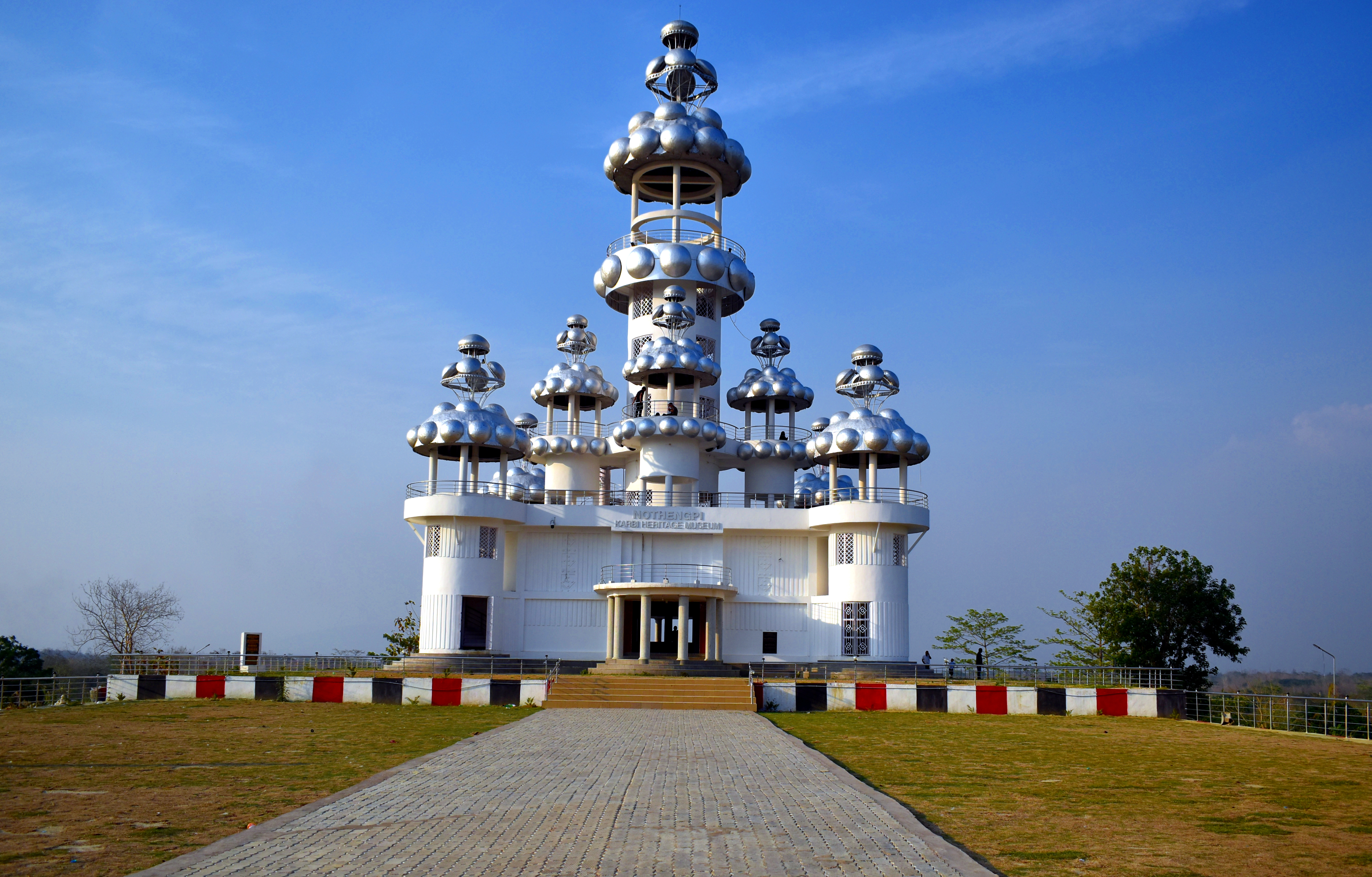
Nothengpi building (Cultural Museum)

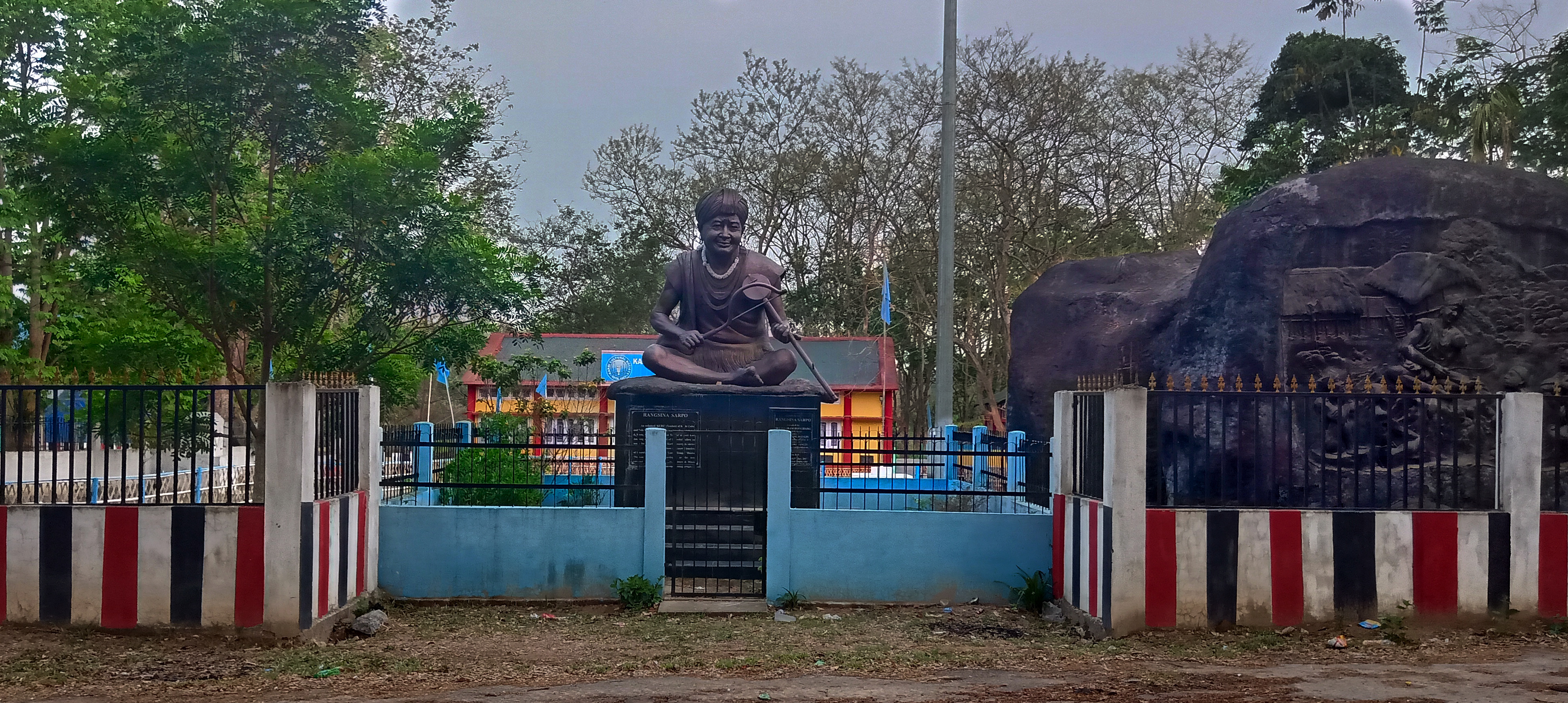
Image showing Rangsina Sarpo Statue in Taralangso

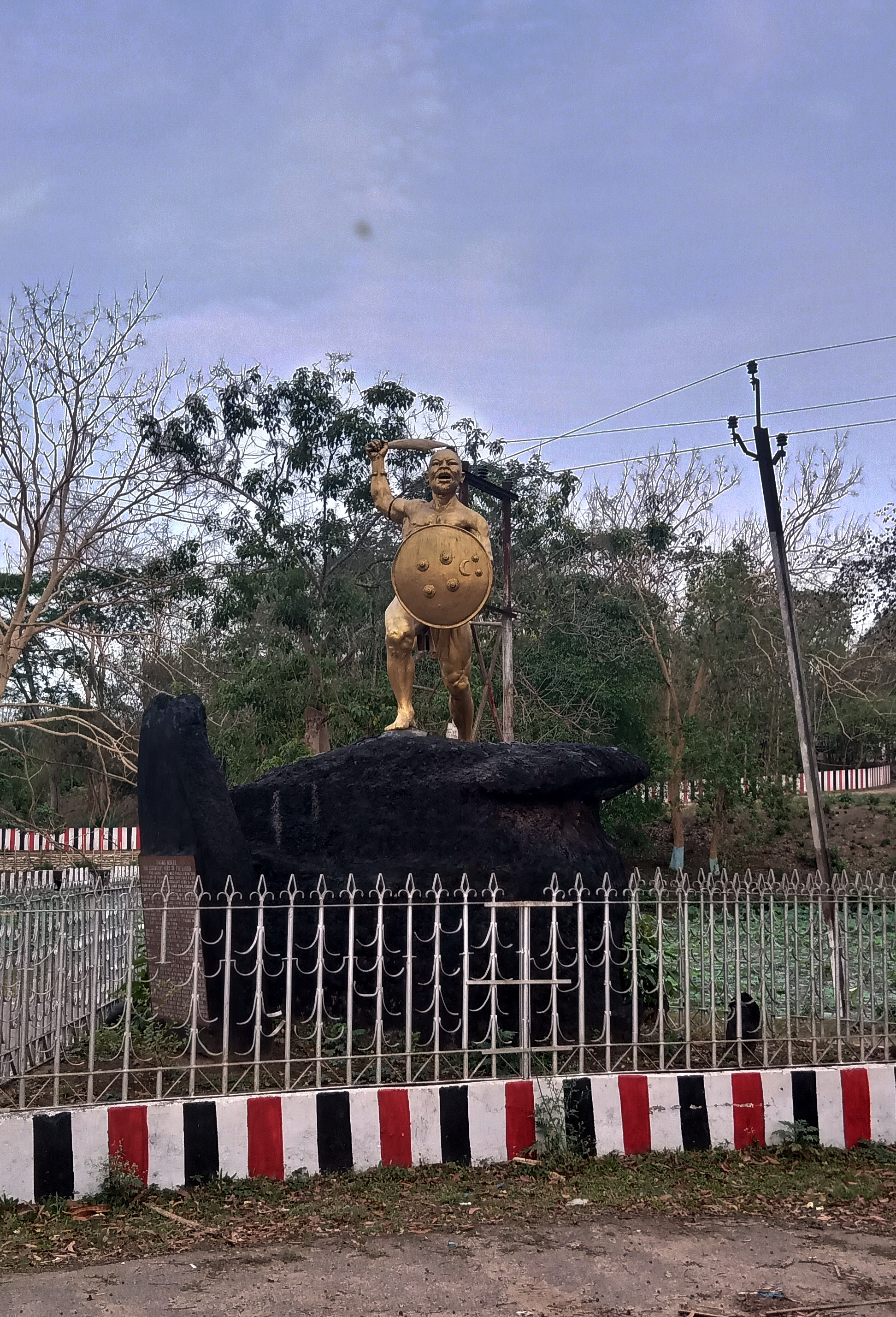
Image showing Thong Nokbe Statue in Taralangso

== See also ==
- Rongker
- Diphu
