= Manja, India =

Manja
- Town
- Location in Assam, India Manja (India)
- Coordinates: 25.9682489°N 93.4372099°E
- Country: India
- State: Assam
- District: Karbi Anglong

Government
  - Body: Manja Town Committee

Population (2015)
  - Total: 30,000

Languages
  - Official: Assamese, Boro
- Time zone: UTC+5:30 (IST)
- PIN: 782461
- Telephone code: 03671
- Vehicle registration: AS-09X-XXXX

Manja is a small town in the Karbi Anglong district of Assam in India. It lies on the banks of the Chomna (Yamuna) river and is surrounded by scenic blue hills. The town is also the starting point of National Highway 329, connecting it to nearby cities such as Diphu and Dimapur. Manja has an estimated population of around 30,000 and serves as a local hub with schools, junior colleges, and a community health centre. The nearby Langvoku waterfall, located about 10 km from the town, is one of its main natural attractions.

== Tourism ==
Langvoku waterfall is 10km away from the town.

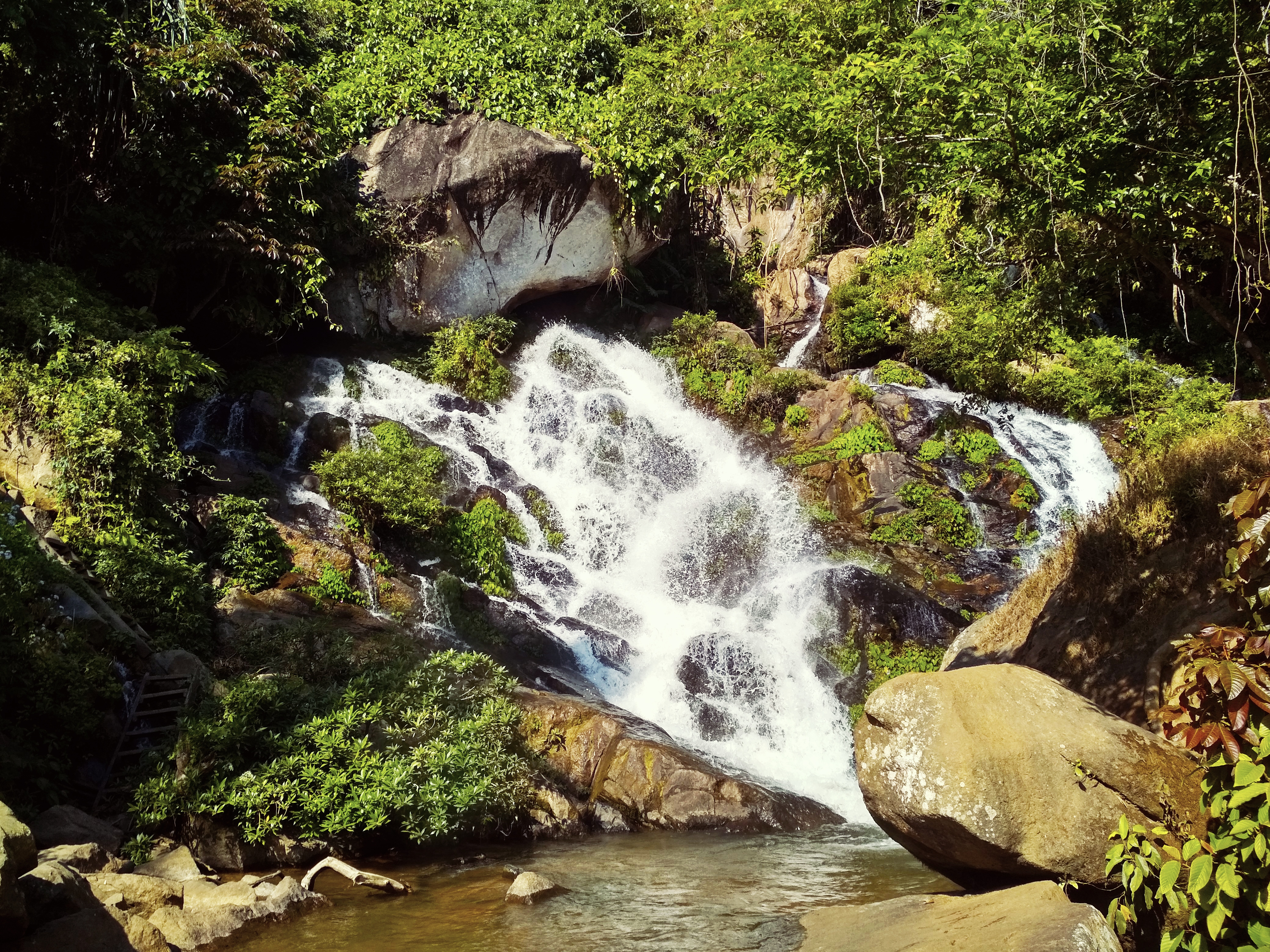
Langkovku waterfall in Manjha, Karbi Anglong

== Transport ==
Manja is the starting point of NH 329. It is also a junction of NH-29 and connects to other important places. The nearest airport is Dimapur airport which is 40 km away and the nearest railway station is Diphu railway station which is 16km away. The town is well connected to other important places by Bus service.

== Education institutions ==
=== Colleges ===
- Don Bosco Junior College
- Manja Junior College

=== Schools ===
- Assamese High School
- Baptist English School
- Jari Teron English School
- Little Flower School
- LP Hindi Schools
- Manja High School
- Nightingale English School
- Oxford Model English School
- South Point English School

=== Computer Institute ===
- CCERT, Manja
- The Next Generation Computech Institute

== Health infrastructure ==
=== Hospital ===
- Manja CHC
