= Joyram Engleng =

Indian politician

Joyram Engleng is an Indian National Congress politician. He is a former Chief Executive Member of the Karbi Anglong Autonomous Council. He was fielded as the candidate from the Diphu Lok Sabha constituency for the 2024 Indian general election.

He was the first politician in Karbi Anglong to join the BJP but quit later on to join the Indian National Congress.
