= Dokmoka =

Dokmoka Dongmukak
- Town
- Location in Assam, India Dokmoka (India)
- Coordinates: 26.208102°N 93.050079°E
- Country: India
- State: Assam
- District: Karbi Anglong

Government
  - Type: Dongmukak Town Committee

Population (2001)
  - Total: 4,670

Languages
  - Official: Karbi, Assamese
  - Regional: Karbi
- Time zone: UTC+5:30 (IST)
- Postal code: 782441
- Vehicle registration: AS

Dokmoka /dɒkˈmoʊkə/ is a town in Karbi Anglong district in the state of Assam, India. Local people like to refer the town as Dongmukak. It has its own Town Committee. It is about 85 km from Diphu and NH-29 passes through it.

== Demographics ==
As of 2001 India census, Dokmoka had a population of 4,670.

== Tourist spot ==
Jhankeshwar Mahadev Temple
Dokmoka Nepali basti village is about 2 km from Dokmoka Town. In this village is the famous Jhankeshwar Mahadev Temple, which is a very important tourist spot. In this temple Lord Shiva is worshipped in the form of Linga.
Akashi Ganga
Akashi Ganga Lord Shiva Temple is famous for the beautiful waterfalls from the rock on top of the hills. Besides, there is a beautiful garden near the temple, which is also a very good tourist and picnic place.
Mahamaya
Mahamaya temple is on top of the hills. The temple is famous for the Maha Lakshmi Mai. This temple is about 400 years old. The hill-view from all four sides appears the same. There is a big natural lake on top of the hills near the temple. Hanuman Bandar is a cave on the hill-top, which is also a very good tourist place.
Dikrutpi Waterfall
Dikrutpi waterfall, the source of the Dikrutpi river is a major tourist attraction in the district. It is 17 km away from Dokmoka.

== Education ==
Thong Nokbe College
Thong Nokbe College is a government college and lies in the foothill of Mahamaya Hill.
Dokmoka Higher Secondary School
It is a Government Assamese higher secondary school. It is about 1.5 km from town.
Krist Jyoti English School
It is a missionaries school at Dokmoka which is about 2 km from main town located on the foothills.
Nihang Rongphar English High School
Nihang Rongphar English school is about 2 km from Dokmoka town. This school is near the hills of Ruipi hill. There is a big sport playground located near the school. Football is played every day in this field.
Saint Xavier English School
It is a private school which is about 1 km from town or near NH36.
Banre Terangpi Residential School
It is a private memorial school is about 1 km from main town toward Dongmukak–Howraghat road.
Church Of Christ English School
It is a private school which is about 1 km from main town.
Nirmal Niketan English School
It is a missionaries school which is about 6/7 km from Dongmukak town.

== See also ==
- Howraghat
