= Bokajan (town) =

Bokajan Inghanlangso
- Town
- Location in Assam, India Bokajan (India)
- Coordinates: 26.02°N 93.78°E
- Country: India
- State: Assam
- District: Karbi Anglong

Government
  - Body: Bokajan Town Committee
  - MP: Horen Sing Bey
- Elevation: 138 m (453 ft)

Population (2011)
  - Total: 19,936

Languages
  - Official: Assamese
  - Associate official: Boro
- Time zone: UTC+5:30 (IST)
- Postal code: 782480
- Vehicle registration: AS 09

Bokajan (/ˈboʊkədʒɑːn/ BOH-kə-jahn) is a town in Karbi Anglong district in the state of Assam, India. Bokajan is best known for its Cement factory (Cement Corporation of India, Bokajan). It is 15 km away from Dimapur and partially borders Nagaland.

== Geography ==
Bokajan is located at 26.02°N 93.78°E. It has an average elevation of 138 metres (452 feet).

Map of Bokajan

== Demographics ==
As of 2011 India census, Bokajan had a population of 19,936. Males constitute 53% of the population and females 47%. Bokajan has an average literacy rate of 86.77%, higher than the national average of 74.04%; with male literacy of 80% and female literacy of 68%. 12% of the population is under 6 years of age.

=== Language ===
Languages spoken in Bokajan (2011)
1. Bengali (33.7%)
2. Assamese (22.8%)
3. Hindi (22.4%)
4. Nepali (7.09%)
5. Karbi (5.33%)
6. others (8.69%)

Bengali is the most spoken language at 6,725 speakers, followed by Assamese at 4,541 and Hindi at 4,461, Karbi is spoken by 1,062 people and Nepali by 1,413.

== Economy ==
=== Industry ===
==== Bokajan CCI ====
The Bokajan Cement Factory is one of the 3 functional cement factories in India, out of the 10 cement factories of the Cement Corporation of India Limited (CCI), which are fully owned by the Government of India. Annually, the plant produces around 198,000 MT by using the dry process. The factory occupies an area that consists of the factory, the mining area and the township. The township consists of various civic amenities such as health centres, guest houses, bank, post office, telephone exchange and so on.

=== Agriculture ===
Most of the populace income is based on agriculture.

== Education ==
Notable educational institutions include Eastern Karbi Anglong College

== Sports ==
A wide array of sports are played in Bokajan, the most popular among them being football, cricket, chess, and karate.

The hub is the public CCI field, and presently the Bokajan Sports Association has made facilities to teach badminton and volleyball to the youth of Bokajan

Bokajan Chess Academy is run by former state champion and national-level player Rintu Brahma.

== Politics ==
Bokajan is part of Autonomous District (Lok Sabha constituency).
