= Karbi people =

Tibeto-Burman ethnic group in north-east India

Karbi
Arlêng
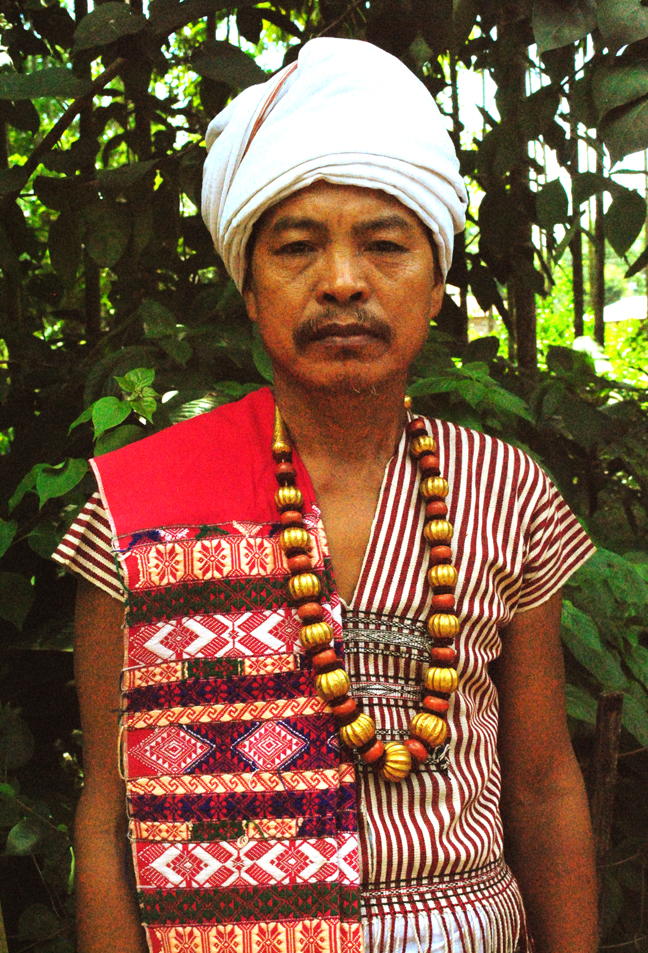
- Traditional Karbi ornaments. Gold is conventionally reserved for men while women wear silver.

Total population
- 421,156

Regions with significant populations
- India: 421,156 (2011 census)
- Karbi Anglong (Assam): 956,313 total district population (2011 census)
- Meghalaya: 14,380
- Nagaland: 584

Languages
- Hills Karbi, Amri Karbi

Religion
- Animism (~52%), Hinduism (~32%), Christianity (~15%), Others (~1%)

Related ethnic groups
- Other Tibeto-Burman groups (Chin people, Kuki people, Dimasa people, Naga people, Bamar people)

The Karbis, historically known as the Mikir, are a Tibeto-Burman ethnic group indigenous to Northeast India, concentrated primarily in the hill districts of Karbi Anglong and West Karbi Anglong in Assam. They rank among the oldest known communities of the Brahmaputra valley, with folklore and archaeology pointing to a long presence in the region before successive waves of displacement pushed them into the hills. The community refers to itself as Arleng, meaning "man" or "people" in the Karbi language, and the name Karbi, given by outsiders, has since been formally adopted. The designation Mikir, applied during British colonial administration and retained in the Constitution Order of the Government of India, is today considered derogatory within the community. The two Karbi-majority districts are governed under the Sixth Schedule of the Indian Constitution through the Karbi Anglong Autonomous Council, which grants them self-governing powers over land, forests, culture, and local administration.

According to the 2011 census, the Karbi population registered under the Scheduled Tribes category stood at 421,156, while the total Karbi-speaking population across India was 528,503, of whom 511,732 lived in Karbi Anglong alone. Scheduled Tribes constitute 56.3 per cent of the total population of Karbi Anglong district as per the same census, while the overall literacy rate for the district stood at 69.25 per cent, with a gap between male (76.14 per cent) and female (62 per cent) literacy.

Besides Karbi Anglong, Karbis are found in Dima Hasao, Kamrup Metropolitan, Hojai, Morigaon, Nagaon, Golaghat, Lakhimpur, Sonitpur and Biswanath Chariali districts of Assam; in the Balijan circle of Papumpare district in Arunachal Pradesh; in Jaintia Hills, Ri Bhoi, East Khasi Hills and West Khasi Hills districts in Meghalaya; in Dimapur district in Nagaland; and in parts of Mizoram.

Location of Karbi Anglong district within Assam.

== Etymology ==
The origin of the word Karbi is not definitively established. The community's own name for itself, Arleng, literally means "man" in the Karbi language and reflects how the Karbis have historically identified themselves by their humanity rather than by an external label. During British rule the community was registered as Mikir in official and administrative records. The word's meaning in the Karbi language remains contested, though the closest proposed derivation is from Mekar, meaning "people." The legacy of this colonial naming has had real administrative consequences. The Constitution of India still recognises only the designation Mikir, which means Karbis living in states such as Meghalaya, Mizoram, and Nagaland cannot claim Scheduled Tribes status, despite being the same community.

== History ==
Racially the Karbis belong to the Mongoloid group and linguistically to the Tibeto-Burman family. The ancestral homeland of Tibeto-Burman-speaking peoples is understood to have lain in western China, in the region of the Yang-Tee-Kiang and Howang-ho rivers, from which successive groups migrated down the courses of the Brahmaputra, the Chindwin, and the Irrawaddy into the Indian subcontinent and Burma. Karbi oral tradition holds that the community once occupied the lowland plains along the Kalang and Kopili rivers and that the area now known as Kaziranga National Park lay within their ancestral territory. Megalithic and monolithic stone monuments found scattered across parts of West Karbi Anglong are embedded in Karbi folklore and stand as physical markers of this long settlement history, though they remain incompletely researched.

During the reigns of the Dimasa Kachari kings the Karbis were driven from the plains into the hills. A portion entered the Jaintia Kingdom, living under Jaintia suzerainty, while others pushed northeast across the river Barapani, a tributary of the Kopili, and established a seat at Socheng in the Rongkhang Ranges. The Karbis who remained under Jaintia rule eventually faced persistent harassment that forced many northward into Ahom territory, where they sought protection from the Barphukan at Raha from the early seventeenth century. Those who entered the Ahom Kingdom later endured the Burmese invasions of Assam between 1817 and 1825, which drove many communities from their homes and into deep forest refuges. Some Karbis crossed the Brahmaputra northward, settling in the areas now comprising the districts of Biswanath, Sonitpur, and Lakhimpur.

=== Regional divisions ===
From the point of view of habitation, the Karbis are divided into three groups: Chinthong (also called Nilip-Ronghang), Ronghang, and Amri. Those who live in the plains districts are referred to as Dumrali. These groupings are geographic and should not be confused with clan divisions; they do not reflect fundamental cultural differences but rather reflect the varying environments in which different Karbi communities have historically lived.

=== Colonial period and the formation of Karbi Anglong ===
Under British administration the Karbi-inhabited territory was designated the Mikir Hills. In 1935 it was classified as a "Partially Excluded Area" under the Government of India Act, meaning it was not directly subject to ordinary provincial legislation. Following Indian independence, political leaders including Semsonsing Ingti, Khorsing Terang, and Seng Bey lobbied the Assam Governor for a dedicated hill district, and in 1946 a socio-political organisation called the Karbi-A-Dorbar was formed to advance this cause. On 17 November 1951 the United Mikir and North Cachar Hills District was established as the first autonomous district council under the Sixth Schedule of the Constitution. The territory was bifurcated in 1970, creating the Mikir Hills district, which was renamed Karbi Anglong on 14 October 1976 to reflect the community's preferred designation. In 2016, the Hamren subdivision was separated to create West Karbi Anglong district, bringing the total number of Karbi-administered districts to two.

=== Insurgency and the 2021 Peace Accord ===
From the late 1980s onward, Karbi Anglong was significantly affected by armed insurgency rooted in longstanding demands for a separate state. Several militant organisations were active across several decades, including the Karbi Longri NC Hills Liberation Front (KLNLF), the People's Democratic Council of Karbi Longri (PDCK), the Karbi People's Liberation Tiger (KPLT), the Kuki Liberation Front (KLF), and the United People's Liberation Army (UPLA). These groups were associated with killings, abductions, and ethnic violence over many years.

On 4 September 2021, a tripartite peace accord, the Karbi Anglong Agreement, was signed in New Delhi between the Government of India, the Government of Assam, and the five insurgent organisations. Over a thousand armed cadres laid down their weapons and rejoined civilian life. The accord included a special development package of Rs 1,000 crore over five years from the central and state governments, provisions to increase the legislative and financial autonomy of the Karbi Anglong Autonomous Council, the establishment of a Karbi Welfare Council for Karbis living outside the KAAC area, and a commitment to consider recognising Karbi as an official language of the KAAC. As of April 2025, Assam Chief Minister Himanta Biswa Sarma visited the district and noted the transformation from armed insurgency to economic participation among former cadres, with many reintegrated as agricultural and fishery entrepreneurs.

== Language ==
Location of West Karbi Anglong district within Assam.

The Karbi language belongs to the Tibeto-Burman language family and is spoken by 528,503 people as the first language across India as of the 2011 census. Two main varieties are recognised: Hills Karbi, the standard form spoken in Karbi Anglong and West Karbi Anglong, and Plains Karbi (also called Dumra Karbi or Amri Karbi), spoken in Kamrup, Morigaon, and Ri Bhoi districts. The language has a tonal system and follows a Subject-Object-Verb word order typical of Tibeto-Burman languages. It was historically an oral language with no native script and is now commonly written in the Roman script.

Assamese functions as the dominant lingua franca for Karbis communicating with other communities, and a number of Assamese loanwords have entered the Karbi vocabulary over generations. The word kaam, for instance, from Assamese, is now used in parts of Karbi Anglong in place of the native sai for "work." The language exists in a diglossic situation where Assamese holds higher prestige in education and formal administration, while Karbi remains the living medium of traditional songs, oral epics, and ritual practice. Local organisations and the KAAC have in recent years invested in Karbi language education and the publication of literature in the language to counter the gradual erosion of its everyday use.

A significant milestone in the recognition of the Karbi language occurred in April 2025, when the Government of Assam officially declared Karbi an administrative language in Karbi Anglong and West Karbi Anglong districts, to be used alongside English for all official correspondence. The move fulfilled a key provision of the 2021 peace accord and was widely welcomed by community organisations and cultural leaders as a long-overdue recognition of linguistic rights.

== Religion ==
Religion among Karbi (2011 census)
Religion	Percent
Animism	52.00%
Hinduism	32.00%
Christianity	15.00%
Others	1.00%

The traditional Karbi religion is an animist belief system known as Aronban, centred on a trinity of deities: Hemphu, the creator and protector; Mukrang, associated with strength and justice; and Rasinja, the female deity of the triad. Those Karbis who still follow traditional practices often refer to themselves as Hemphu-Mukrang aso, meaning "Sons of Hemphu and Mukrang." The faith holds that every entity in the natural world possesses a spiritual essence, and the Karbis accordingly worship spirits of specific places and territories, known as Longri Arnam (territorial deities), alongside household deities and ancestral spirits known as Karhi. The Karbis have no temples or idols. Offerings of eggs, chicken, goat, and pig are made at sacred groves and outdoor sites in ceremonies directed toward specific deities, and the Karbi deities can be divided into three groups according to their function: Hem-Angtar, Rongker, and Thengpi-Thengso.

The relationship between Aronban and Hinduism is complicated by census methodology. Many animist Karbis have historically been recorded as Hindu in official data because the census did not separately enumerate their faith as a distinct religion, creating a distorted statistical picture. Scholars have noted that this has placed the traditional Karbi faith in legal and cultural jeopardy. Christianity, which accounts for approximately 15 per cent of the community, has grown through missionary activity over the past century and in many areas exists in a hybrid relationship with Aronban rather than fully displacing it. Several new religious movements have also emerged in recent decades, including Lokhimon, a variation of Vaishnavism founded by Lokhon Ingti Hensek; the Karbi Bhaktitom Trust, founded by Smt. Ambika Tokbipi; and Honghari.

== Culture and tradition ==
=== Clan and social organisation ===
Karbi society is patrilineal and organised around five major exogamous clans called Kur: Engti (Lijang), Terang (Hanjang), Enghee (Ejang), Teron (Kronjang), and Timung (Tungjang), each subdivided into many sub-clans. Because clans are strictly exogamous, members of the same clan are regarded as siblings and marriage between them is prohibited. Neither spouse changes their surname on marriage, and children inherit the father's clan name. Cousin marriages are traditionally favoured and love marriages are common. Arranged marriages are rarely seen in modern Karbi society. The concept of dowry has no place in Karbi custom, as with most indigenous communities of Northeast India.

The traditional governance of Karbi villages was headed by the Lingdokpo (the king), selected by a parliament called the Pinpomar, supported by the Katharpo, the Dilis, the Habes, and the Pinpos. Several contiguous Karbi villages constituted one Longri, administered by an officer called the Habe or Habai. The kingdom had twelve such Longris, grouped into four Artus, each governed by a Lingdok. These posts survive today in ceremonial form only, as actual governance operates through the Karbi Anglong Autonomous Council.

=== Festivals ===
The Karbi calendar contains several major festivals, most tied to the agricultural cycle or to the community's religious obligations toward its deities and ancestors.

Rongker is held annually, typically in April before the jhum season begins, and is organised by the male elders of the village at a sacred outdoor site. The ceremonies seek protection from disease, crop failure, and calamity for the coming year, with the forest deity Longle A Hi-E invoked specifically for the protection of the harvest.

The Chomangkan, also called thi-karhi, is the most important and elaborate of all Karbi ceremonies. It is a funerary rite performed to guide a deceased person's soul to the land of the ancestors, but it is not an immediate funeral: families typically hold the ceremony months or years after a death, when they are financially prepared. The event runs for four days and four nights and involves the whole community, who come without formal invitation. At its ceremonial core is the chanting of oral epics including the Mosera Kihir, which narrates the migration history of the Karbis as the soul embarks on its journey. Various types of dances are performed by youths during Chomangkan, including Hacha Kekan, a particularly lively dance performed during harvest. The ceremony is understood not as mourning but as a celebration of the soul's liberation, and it serves as a major means of social cohesion and cultural transmission.

The Karbi Youth Festival, locally called Karbi Riso-Nimso Rong Aje, is an annual event held between 15 and 19 February in Taralangso, Diphu, Karbi Anglong. The festival brings together Karbis and other tribes to display and propagate their shared cultural traditions on a single platform.

=== Clothing and ornaments ===
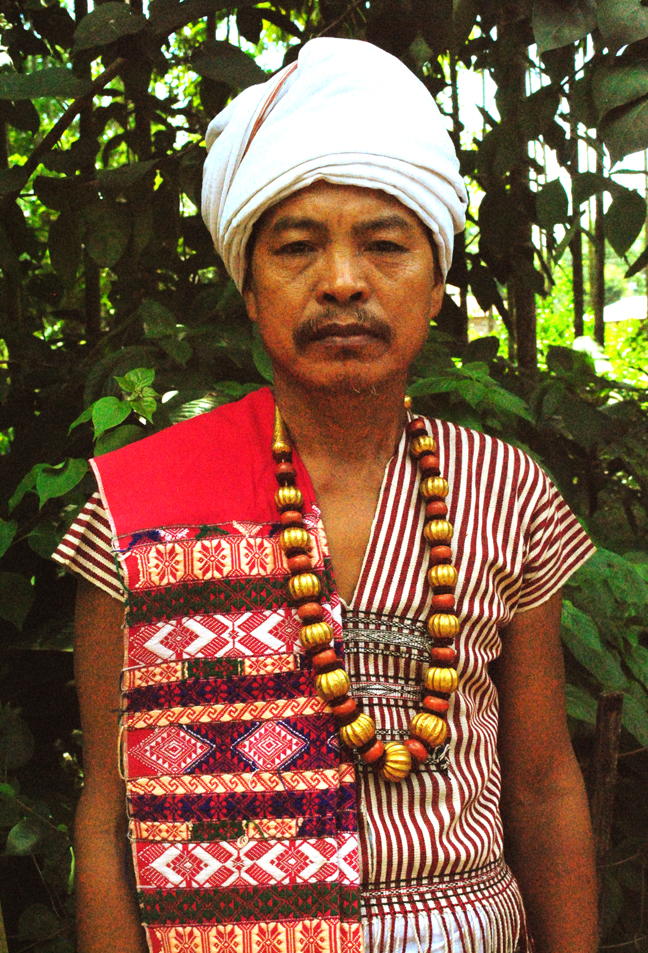
Traditional Karbi ornaments displayed at a cultural event. The necklace styles shown include several forms of the Lek.

Karbi dress varies between sub-groups and is made from locally grown cotton and Eri silk, which Karbi women weave on traditional back-strap and fly-shuttle looms. Traditionally the Karbis used three colours: white, indigo black, and red, though in recent decades weaving has evolved to incorporate more varied palettes while maintaining traditional motifs. Women wear the Pini, a black skirt tied at the waist, and the Pekok, a square cloth covering the upper body tied at the right shoulder, in various designs including pe sleng for young women, pe jangphong for middle-aged women, and pe sarpi for older women. The Vamkok is a decorative woven belt that secures the Pini, and the Jiso, a long decorative cloth worn over the chest, has largely been replaced in modern usage by the blouse. Men wear the Choi jacket, the Poho head wrap, and the Sator, a white lower garment. Different variants of each garment indicate the wearer's age and social standing.

A distinctive feature of Karbi ornament tradition is that gold is reserved for men while women wear silver. Karbi women are known for the Lek, a necklace of coins or colourful beads in various forms including Lek Pengkhara, Lek Bonghom, and Lek Jingjiri. Men wear gold Leks including Lek Ruve, Lek Sobai, and Lek Manduli. Both men and women wear the Roi bangle, made of brass, silver, or gold, in forms such as Roi Pengkhara and Pinso. The No Thengpi is a distinctive ear ornament for women, with varieties such as Thengpi Angrongkatengbai; elderly Karbi women traditionally stretched their earlobes to accommodate bamboo tubes as part of this tradition. Men wear the Norik ear ornament in gold or silver. Karbi priests wear copper rings only, which distinguishes them from lay community members.

Historically, a characteristic feature of Karbi women was the duk, a facial tattoo applied with indigo dye from the plant sibu (Marsdenia tinctoria), running from the forehead to the chin. The practice originated during the Burmese invasions of Assam between 1817 and 1825, when Karbi women marked their faces to appear unattractive to Burmese soldiers and avoid capture. Over time the duk evolved from a survival strategy into a cultural emblem of identity, purity, and womanhood, and girls were traditionally considered eligible for marriage only after receiving it. The practice has declined rapidly among younger generations and is now rarely seen, though young women at cultural events occasionally apply temporary markings as a symbolic tribute to the tradition.

=== Music and oral tradition ===
The Karbis have an exceptionally rich oral tradition in which songs function as the primary archive of historical memory. Narrative songs called mosera are ceremonially chanted during the Chomangkan and recount the migration history of the tribe from origin to present, passing through each generation via specialist ritual singers called lunsepo. The oral tradition is credited in community memory to Rangsina Sarpo, regarded as the first mentor of Karbi music, art, and culture, who is said to have brought a cultural renaissance to the community by travelling as a folk singer. Songs, hymns, and folktales frequently reference the local flora, fauna, and rivers, reflecting the animist worldview in which the natural world and human life are inseparable. Traditional songs in Karbi are generally sung by trained experts who are familiar not only with the words but with their layered meanings, and the knowledge is considered specialised enough that not everyone attempts it.

Karbi folk dance.

=== Craft and material culture ===
Karbis are known for a strong tradition of craft self-sufficiency. They carve utensils from wood, spin cotton and Eri silk for clothing, and weave on traditional looms set up in their own dwellings. Weaving has traditionally been the domain of women. The demand for traditional Karbi weaves remains high in Karbi Anglong even today, cherished by both old and young, and Karbi women weavers continue producing traditional cloths while also adapting designs for contemporary tastes. Dance, particularly the Chong-Kedam (a traditional shield and sword dance), also forms part of the material and performative culture of the community and is performed at major festivals and ceremonial occasions.

== Economy ==
Agriculture is the primary livelihood of the Karbi people and sustains more than 85 per cent of the rural population of Karbi Anglong district. In the hills, the traditional farming system is jhum, the slash-and-burn method in which hill slopes are cleared, burned, and cultivated in rotation before being left fallow for years to allow soil recovery. Jhum is not merely a farming technique but a cultural institution bound up with communal labour, ritual festivals, and the annual Rongker ceremony. Tribals generally rely heavily on wild vegetables found in the hills for both domestic consumption and commercial purposes, and plants such as Roselle (Hanserong) and Colocasia (Henru) are grown in almost every tribal household. The main crops grown are paddy, maize, wheat, jute, sugarcane, ginger, turmeric, and a range of vegetables and fruits. Karbi Anglong is the second highest ginger-producing district in Assam.

As of the 2003 Assam Human Development Report, Karbi Anglong recorded the highest Human Poverty Index value in the state at 33.52, reflecting persistent socioeconomic marginalisation despite the district's considerable natural resources. In 2006, the Indian government named Karbi Anglong one of the country's 250 most backward districts and it has been receiving funds under the Backward Regions Grant Fund Programme. The integration of the traditional jhum economy into the cash market has brought both opportunities and disruptions; farming families increasingly earn income from ginger and pineapple for commercial markets while losing traditional seed varieties and agricultural knowledge in the process.

Karbi Anglong is notably rich in wildlife. Areas adjoining Kaziranga National Park support populations of one-horned rhinoceros, wild buffalo, tiger, leopard, and elephant. The district's forests include moist semi-evergreen, mixed moist deciduous, and riverain types, and approximately 41 per cent of the geographical area is under forest cover.

== Contemporary issues ==
=== Land rights and resource conflicts ===
Land rights remain among the most pressing concerns for the Karbi community. The protections of the Sixth Schedule, which vest land management authority in the Karbi Anglong Autonomous Council, have come under recurring stress from encroachments, development projects, and competing legal claims over tribal and customary lands.

In October 2024, the Asian Development Bank approved a USD 434.25 million loan for a 1,000 megawatt solar power project, the Assam Solar Park, to be built on approximately 2,400 hectares of land at Lahorijan in Karbi Anglong. The proposal provoked immediate resistance from the Karbi Anglong Solar Power Project Affected People's Rights Committee (KASPPAPRC), representing over 20,000 Karbi, Naga, and Adivasi families who faced displacement from agricultural, forest, and customary lands with deep cultural and spiritual significance for their communities. Following years of petitions, press conferences, formal complaints, and the intervention of Assam MP Ajit Kumar Bhuyan who raised the matter in the Rajya Sabha in March 2025, the Government of India withdrew its financing request and the ADB formally cancelled the loan on 23 May 2025 in what community organisations described as a landmark victory for indigenous land rights. However, as of January 2026, the National Commission for Scheduled Tribes was still seeking a status report from the KAAC on the land in question, as the 90-year land allotment agreement between the KAAC and the state power distribution company remained legally valid despite the project's cancellation.

== See also ==
- Karbi Anglong Autonomous Council
- Karbi Youth Festival
- Rongker
- Karbi language
- List of Scheduled Tribes in Assam
- Sixth Schedule to the Constitution of India
