= 2014 Indian general election in Meghalaya =

Indian General Election in Meghalaya, 2014
- 9 April

2 seats
- Turnout: 68.80% (▲4.42%)

	First party	Second party
Party	INC	NPP
Seats won	1	1
Seat change	▼1	▲1
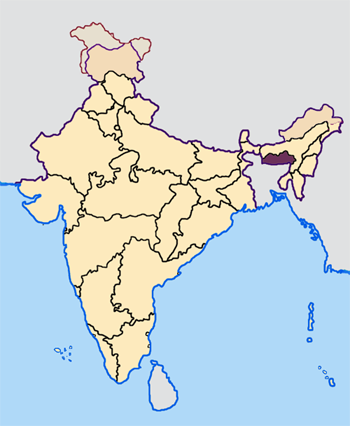
- Meghalaya
Prime Minister before election
Manmohan Singh
INC
Prime Minister after election
Narendra Modi
BJP

The Indian General Election, 2014 polls in Meghalaya for two Lok Sabha seats will be held in a single phase on 9 April 2014. As of 28 January 2014 The total voter strength of Meghalaya is 1,553,028.

== Contested Parties ==
Party	Flag	Symbol	Leader	Seats contested
Indian National Congress			Vincent Pala	2
National People's Party			Conrad Sangma	1
United Democratic Party (Meghalaya)			Donkupar Roy	1
Bharatiya Janata Party			Narendra Modi	1

== Opinion polling ==
Conducted in Month(s)	Ref	Polling Organisation/Agency		
Conducted in Month(s)	Ref	Polling Organisation/Agency	INC	NPP
Aug–Oct 2013		Times Now-India TV-CVoter	1	1
Jan–Feb 2014		Times Now-India TV-CVoter	1	1

== Election schedule ==
Constituency wise Election schedule are given below –

Polling Day	Phase	Date	Constituencies	Voting Percentage
1	2	9 April	Shillong, Tura	71

== Results ==
As per the results declared on 16 May 2014, the Indian National Congress candidate Vincent Pala secured the Shillong Lok Sabha seat while the National Peoples Party candidate Purno Agitok Sangma won the Tura seat.

1	1
NPP	INC

=== Detailed Result ===
Party Name	Popular vote			Seats		
Party Name	Votes	%	±pp	Contested	Won	+/−
INC	4,08,925	37.93	▼6.91	2	1	Steady
NPEP	2,39,301	22.20	New	1	1	▲1
UDP	1,06,817	9.91	▼5.21	1	0	Steady
BJP	95,979	8.90	Steady	1	0	Steady
AAP	8,815	0.82	Steady	1	0	Steady
CPI	7,418	0.69	▼0.14	1	0	Steady
IND	1,80,658	16.76	▲14.17	3	0	Steady
NOTA	30,145	2.80	Steady	2	Steady	Steady
Total	10,78,058	100%	-	10	2	-

=== Constituency wise ===
Constituency		Winner				Runner-up				Margin	
Constituency		Candidate	Party	Votes	%	Candidate	Party	Votes	%	Votes	%
1	Shillong	Vincent Pala	INC	209,340	33.76	P. B. M. Basaiawmoit	IND	168,961	27.25	40,379	6.51
2	Tura	P. A. Sangma	NPEP	239,301	52.22	Daryl William Ch Momin	INC	199,585	43.55	39,716	8.67

== Assembly segments wise lead of Parties ==
Party	Assembly segments	Position in Assembly (as of 2013 elections)
Indian National Congress	23	29
National People's Party	18	2
United Democratic Party	9	8
Bharatiya Janata Party	5	0
Others	5	21
Total	60	
