= Shillong Lok Sabha constituency =

Lok Sabha constituency in Meghalaya

Coordinates: 25.6°N 91.9°E

Shillong ML-1
- Lok Sabha constituency
- Interactive Map Outlining Shillong Lok Sabha constituency

Constituency details
- Country: India
- Region: Northeast India
- State: Meghalaya
- Assembly constituencies: 36
- Established: 1957
- Total electors: 14,00,411
- Reservation: ST

Member of Parliament
- 18th Lok Sabha
- Incumbent Vacant

Shillong Lok Sabha constituency is one of the two Lok Sabha (parliamentary) constituencies in Meghalaya state in northeastern India.

== Assembly segments ==
Shillong Lok Sabha constituency comprises 36 Vidhan Sabha (legislative assembly) constituencies in six districts: West Jaintia Hills, East Jaintia Hills, Ri-Bhoi, East Khasi Hills, West Khasi Hills and South West Khasi Hills district. The Assembly constituencies are as follows:

AC	Assembly	District	Party	2024 lead
1	Nartiang (ST)	West Jaintia Hills	NPP	VPP
2	Jowai (ST)	West Jaintia Hills	NPP	VPP
3	Raliang (ST)	West Jaintia Hills	NPP	VPP
4	Mowkaiaw (ST)	West Jaintia Hills	NPP	VPP
5	Sutnga Saipung (ST)	East Jaintia Hills	NPP	VPP
6	Khliehriat (ST)	East Jaintia Hills	BJP	VPP
7	Amlarem (ST)	West Jaintia Hills	BJP	VPP
8	Mawhati (ST)	Ri Bhoi	NPP	VPP
9	Nongpoh (ST)	Ri Bhoi	BJP	INC
10	Jirang (ST)	Ri Bhoi	NPP	INC
11	Umsning (ST)	Ri Bhoi	NPP	VPP
12	Umroi (ST)	Ri Bhoi	NPP	VPP
13	Mawryngkneng (ST)	East Khasi Hills	VPP	VPP
14	Pynthorumkhrah	East Khasi Hills	BJP	VPP
15	Mawlai (ST)	East Khasi Hills	VPP	VPP
16	East Shillong (ST)	East Khasi Hills	NPP	NPP
17	North Shillong (ST)	East Khasi Hills	VPP	VPP
18	West Shillong	East Khasi Hills	NPP	VPP
19	South Shillong	East Khasi Hills	BJP	NPP
20	Mylliem (ST)	East Khasi Hills	NPP	VPP
21	Nongthymmai (ST)	East Khasi Hills	AITC	VPP
22	Nongkrem (ST)	East Khasi Hills	VPP	VPP
23	Sohiong (ST)	East Khasi Hills	BJP	VPP
24	Mawphlang (ST)	East Khasi Hills	BJP	VPP
25	Mawsynram (ST)	East Khasi Hills	BJP	VPP
26	Shella (ST)	East Khasi Hills	BJP	VPP
27	Pynursla (ST)	East Khasi Hills	NPP	VPP
28	Sohra (ST)	East Khasi Hills	NPP	VPP
29	Mawkynrew (ST)	East Khasi Hills	NPP	VPP
30	Mairang (ST)	West Khasi Hills	UDP	VPP
31	Mawthadraishan (ST)	West Khasi Hills	HSPDP	VPP
32	Nongstoin (ST)	West Khasi Hills	NPP	VPP
33	Rambrai-Jyrngam (ST)	West Khasi Hills	IND	VPP
34	Mawshynrut (ST)	West Khasi Hills	HSPDP	VPP
35	Ranikor (ST)	South West Khasi Hills	BJP	VPP
36	Mawkyrwat (ST)	South West Khasi Hills	NPP	VPP

== Members of Parliament ==
From Autonomous Districts constituency, as part of Assam:

Year	Member	Party
1952	Bonily Khongmen	Indian National Congress
1957	Hoover Hynniewta	Independent
1962	George Gilbert Swell	All Party Hill Leaders Conference
1967	George Gilbert Swell	All Party Hill Leaders Conference
1971	George Gilbert Swell	All Party Hill Leaders Conference

From Shillong constituency:

Year	Member	Party
1977	Hoping Stone Lyngdoh	Hill State People's Democratic Party
1980	Bajubon Kharlukhi	All Party Hill Leaders Conference
1984	George Gilbert Swell	Independent
1989	Peter G. Marbaniang	Indian National Congress
1991	Peter G. Marbaniang	Indian National Congress
1996	George Gilbert Swell	Independent
1998	Paty Ripple Kyndiah	Indian National Congress
1999	Paty Ripple Kyndiah	Indian National Congress
2004	Paty Ripple Kyndiah	Indian National Congress
2009	Vincent Pala	Indian National Congress
2014	Vincent Pala	Indian National Congress
2019	Vincent Pala	Indian National Congress
2024	Ricky Syngkon (Note: died in 2026)	Voice of the People Party
2026^		

== Election results ==
=== 2026 by-election ===
2026 Shillong by-election: Shillong
Party	Candidate	Votes	%	±%
VPP	Batskhem Myrboh			
INC	Vincent Pala			
NPP	D. R. L Nongliat			
NOTA	None of the above			
Majority				
Turnout				
		Swing		

=== General election 2024 ===
2024 Indian general election: Shillong
Party	Candidate	Votes	%	±%
VPP	Ricky Andrew J. Syngkon	571,078	55.02	New
INC	Vincent Pala	1,99,168	19.19	▼34.33
NPP	Ampareen Lyngdoh	1,86,488	17.97	New
UDP	Robertjune Kharjahrin	44,563	4.29	▼29.80
IND	Lakhon Kma	18,582	1.79	New
IND	Peter Shallam	7,024	0.68	New
NOTA	None of the above	11,008	1.06	▲0.50
Majority		2,71,910	35.83	▲16.39
Turnout		10,38,557	74.03	▲8.55
VPP gain from INC		Swing		

=== General election 2019 ===
2019 Indian general elections: Shillong
Party	Candidate	Votes	%	±%
INC	Vincent H. Pala	419,689	53.52	▲19.76
UDP	Jemino Mawthoh	2,67,256	34.08	▲16.85
BJP	Sanbor Shullai	76,683	9.78	▼5.70
KHNAM	T.H.S. Bonney	6,580	0.84	
IND	Romeo Phira Rani	4,961	0.63	
IND	Samuel Hashah	4,601	0.59	
NOTA	None of the Above	4,420	0.56	▼1.21
Majority		1,52,433	19.44	▲12.93
Turnout		7,84,279	65.48	
INC hold		Swing		

=== General election 2014 ===
2014 Indian general elections: Shillong
Party	Candidate	Votes	%	±%
INC	Vincent H. Pala	209,340	33.76	−14.59
IND.	Prechard B. M. Basaiawmoit	1,68,961	27.25	N/A
UDP	Paul Lyngdoh	1,06,817	17.23	−8.67
BJP	Shibun Lyngdoh	95,979	15.48	N/A
AAP	Armerington Kharshiing	8,815	1.42	N/A
NOTA	None of the Above	10,960	1.77	N/A
Majority		40,379	6.51	−15.94
Turnout		6,20,041	63.22	+0.99
INC hold		Swing	-14.59	

=== General election 2009 ===
2009 Indian general elections: Shillong
Party	Candidate	Votes	%	±%
INC	Vincent H. Pala	232,270	48.35	
UDP	John Filmore Kharshiing	1,24,402	25.89	
HSPDP	P. B. M. Basaiawmoit	97,613	20.32	
Majority		1,07,868	22.45	
Turnout		4,80,379	62.23	
INC hold		Swing		

=== General election 2004 ===
General Election, 2004: Shillong
Party	Candidate	Votes	%	±%
INC	Paty Ripple Kyndiah	190,058	51.68	
Independent	S. Loniak Marbaniang	1,19,162	32.40	
BJP	Sanbor Swell Lyngdoh	58,560	15.92	
Majority		70,896	19.28	
Turnout		3,67,780	46.85	
INC hold		Swing		

=== 1999 Indian general election ===
1999 Indian general election: Shillong
Party	Candidate	Votes	%	±%
INC	Paty Ripple Kyndiah	145,020	39.75	
UDP	Stanlington D. Khongwir	1,07,197	29.38	
HSPDP	Hopingstone Lyngdoh	40,301	11.05	
PDA	Sounder S. Cajee	33,164	9.09	
BJP	Thrang Hok Rangad	31,859	8.73	
Independent	Damian Saioo	4,619	1.27	
CPI	Dalington Dympep	1,719	0.47	
Ajeya Bharat Party	Khlur Singh Lyngdoh	586	0.16	
Independent	Matthew A. Lanong	391	0.11	
Majority		37,823	10.37	
Turnout		3,69,010	50.94	
Swing to INC from UDP		Swing		

=== 1977 ===
1977 Indian general election: Shillong
Party	Candidate	Votes	%	±%
IND	Hoping Stone Lyngdoh	55,732	30.27	
INC	Peter Garnette Marbaniang	50,967	27.68	
IND	George Gilbert Swell	38,841	21.09	
IND	P. Ripple Kyndiah	38,606	20.96	
Majority		4,765	2.59	
Turnout		190,149	55.61	
Independent win (new seat)				

=== 1971 ===
1971 Indian general election: Autonomous Districts (ST)
Party	Candidate	Votes	%	±%
APHLC	G. G. Swell	90,772	51.24	
IND	Hopingstone Lyngdoh	59,228	33.44	
IND	Bapuram Singnar	27,140	15.32	
Majority		31,544	17.80	
Turnout		183,301	43.78	
APHLC hold		Swing		

=== 1967 ===
1967 Indian general election: Autonomous District (ST)
Party	Candidate	Votes	%	±%
APHLC	G. G. Swell	112,492	61.37	
INC	B. G. Momin	70,819	38.63	
Majority		41,673	22.74	
Turnout		190,841	51.40	
APHLC hold		Swing		

=== 1962 ===
1962 Indian general election: Autonomous Districts (ST)
Party	Candidate	Votes	%	±%
APHLC	Gilbert G. Swell	91,850	61.83	
INC	Jetlie E. Tariang	56,701	38.17	
Majority		35,149	23.66	
Turnout		153,235	47.87	
Swing to APHLC from Independent		Swing		

=== 1957 ===
1957 Indian general election: Autonomous Districts (ST)
Party	Candidate	Votes	%	±%
IND	Hoover Hynniewta	58,428	49.86	
INC	Swell, G. Gilbert	40,580	34.63	
IND	Basan, Liong Donaldson	18,169	15.51	
Majority		17,848	15.23	
Turnout		117,177	29.76	
Swing to Independent from INC		Swing		

=== 1952 ===
1952 Indian general election: Autonomous Districts
Party	Candidate	Votes	%	±%
INC	Bonily Khongmen	59,326	54.10	
KJD (Note: Khasi-Jaintia Durbar)	Wilson Reade	32,987	30.08	
HPP (Note: Hill People Party)	Llong Donaldson Basan	17,350	15.82	
Majority		26,339	24.02	
Turnout		109,663	30.41	
INC win (new seat)				

== See also ==
- Shillong
- List of constituencies of the Lok Sabha
- Shilloing
