= Political parties in Meghalaya =

The major national political parties in the state of Meghalaya are the Indian National Congress (INC) and the Bharatiya Janata Party (BJP).

== Major National-Level Parties ==
- National People's Party (NPP) found by late P. A. Sangma
- Indian National Congress (INC) led by Rahul Gandhi
- Bharatiya Janata Party (BJP) led by Narendra Modi

== Regional Parties ==
- United Democratic Party (UDP) found by late B. B. Lyngdoh
- Hill State People's Democratic Party (HSPDP)
- All India Trinamool Congress (AITC) led by Charles Pyngrope in Meghalaya
- Nationalist Congress Party (NCP) led by Ajit Pawar
- Voice of the People Party (VPP)
- Khun Hynniewtrep National Awakening Movement (KHNAM) led by Pyndapborthiaw Saibon
- Garo National Council (GNC)
- North East Social Democratic Party (NESDP) led by Lamboklang Mylliem
- Meghalaya Democratic Party (MDP) led by S.B. Nongdhar

== Defunct Regional Parties ==
- All Party Hill Leaders Conference (APHLC) {reformed as Hill People's Union}
- All Party Hill Leaders Conference-Armison Marak (APHLC-AM) {merged with UDP}
- Hill People's Union (HPU) {merged into UDP}
- Public Demands Implementation Convention (PDIC) {merged into UDP}
- People's Democratic Front (PDF) led by P. N. Syiem and Auspicious L. Mawphlang
- Meghalaya Progressive Peoples Party (MPPP) {merged into UDP}
- Meghalaya Nationalist Congress Party (MNCP) {merged with Congress}
- Peoples Democratic Movement (PDM) {merged with Congress}
- Khun Hynniewtrep National Awakening Movement (Paul Lyngdoh) (KHNAM-P) {merged with UDP}
