= MPCC =

MPCC can refer to:

- Military Planning and Conduct Capability, the operational headquarters of European Union military operations
- Mouvement pour un cyclisme crédible, an organisation of professional cycling teams
- Military Police Complaints Commission, a Canadian body
- Maharashtra Pradesh Congress Committee, an Indian political party in Maharashtra
- Madhya Pradesh Congress Committee, an Indian political party in Madhya Pradesh
- Manipur Pradesh Congress Committee, an Indian political party in Manipur
- Mizoram Pradesh Congress Committee, an Indian political party in Mizoram
- Meghalaya Pradesh Congress Committee, an Indian political party in Meghalaya
