= 2024 Indian general election in Meghalaya =

2024 Indian general elections in Meghalaya

- 19 April 2024

All 2 Meghalaya seats in the Lok Sabha
- Opinion polls
- Turnout: 76.6% (▲5.17%)
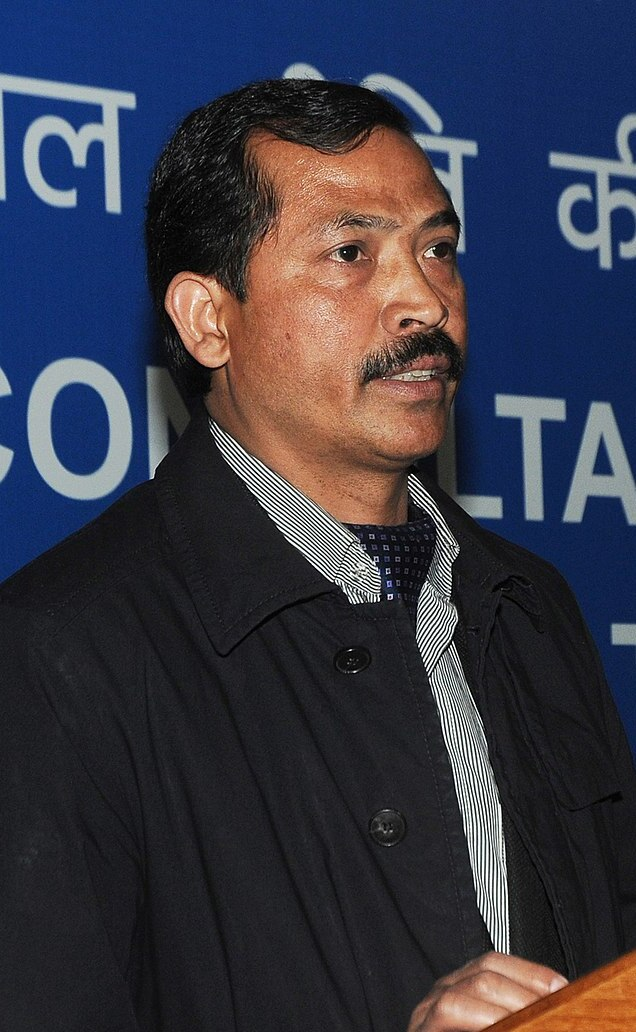

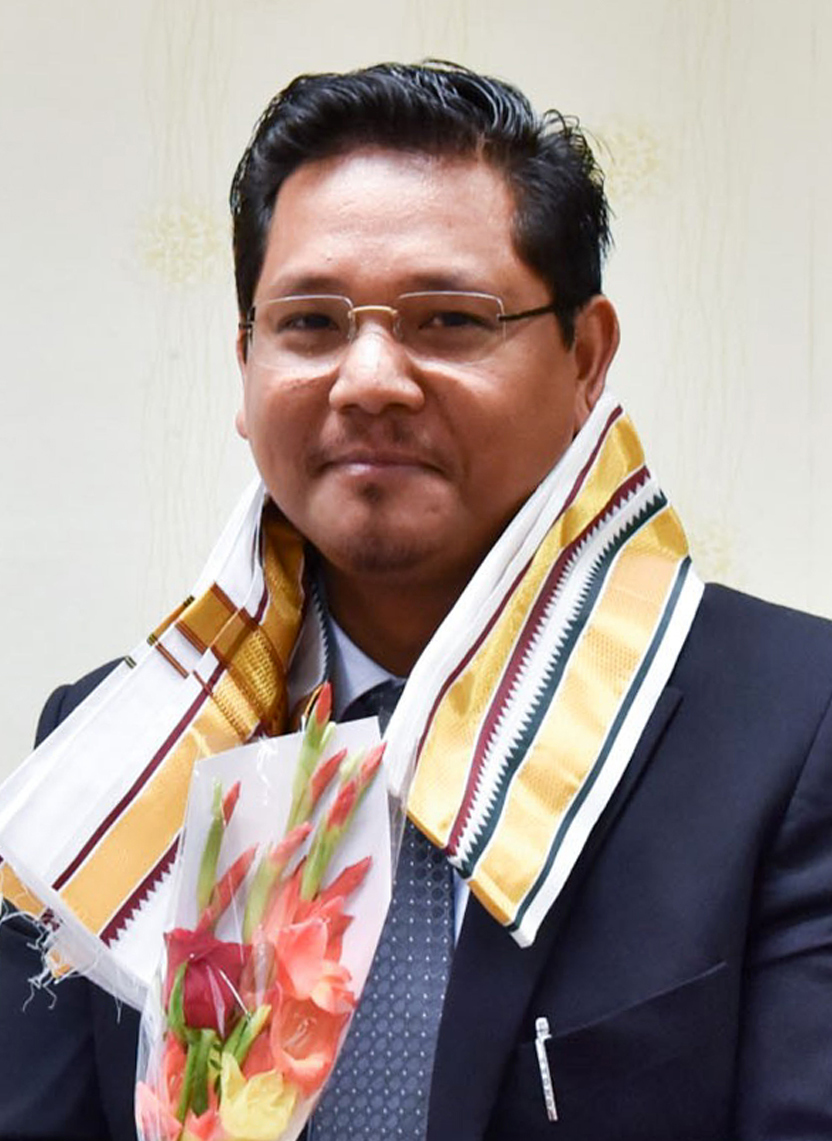
	First party	Second party	Third party
		VPP
Leader	Vincent Pala	Ardent Miller Basaiawmoit	Conrad Sangma
Party	INC	VPP	NPP
Alliance	INDIA	-	NDA
Leader since	2021	2023	2016
Leader's seat	Shillong (Lost)	Did not contest	Did not contest
Last election	48.67%, 1 seat	New Party	22.45%, 1 seat
Seats before	1	0	1
Seats won	1	1	0
Seat change	Steady	▲1	▼1
Popular vote	580,103	569,156	412,741
Percentage	34.05%	33.40%	24.22%
Swing	▼14.62 pp	New Party	▲1.77 pp
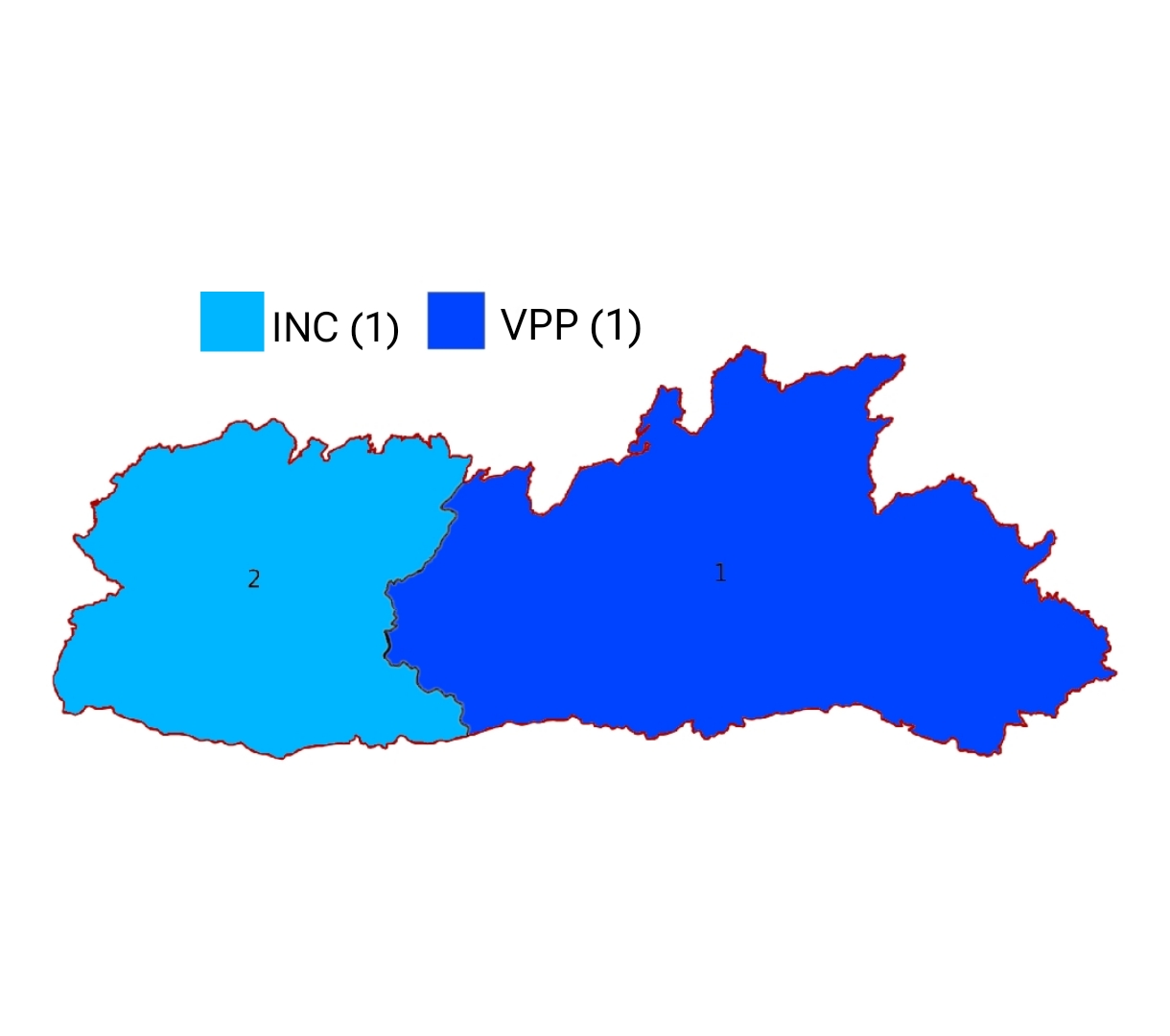
- Lok Sabha Results of Meghalaya
Prime Minister before election
Narendra Modi
BJP
Prime Minister after election
Narendra Modi
BJP

The 2024 Indian general election was held in Meghalaya on 19 April 2024 to elect 2 members from Tura and Shillong constituencies to the 18th Lok Sabha.

== Election schedule ==
Poll event	Phase
Poll event	I
Notification date	20 March
Last date for filing nomination	27 March
Scrutiny of nomination	28 March
Last Date for withdrawal of nomination	30 March
Date of poll	19 April
Date of counting of votes/Result	4 June 2024
No. of constituencies	2

== Parties and alliances ==
=== Indian National Developmental Inclusive Alliance ===
Indian National Developmental Inclusive Alliance

Party	Flag	Symbol	Leader	Seats contested
Indian National Congress			Vincent Pala	2

=== National Democratic Alliance ===
National Democratic Alliance

Party	Flag	Symbol	Leader	Seats contested
National People's Party			Agatha Sangma	2

=== Others ===
Party	Flag	Symbol	Leader	Seats contested
All India Trinamool Congress			Charles Pyngrope	1
United Democratic Party			Metbah Lyngdoh	1
Voice of the People Party			Ardent Miller Basaiawmoit	1

== Candidates ==
Constituency							
Constituency		INDIA		NDA		Others	
1	Shillong (ST)	INC	Vincent Pala	NPP	Ampareen Lyngdoh	UDP	Robertjune Kharjahrin
1	Shillong (ST)	INC	Vincent Pala	NPP	Ampareen Lyngdoh	VPP	Ricky AJ Syngkon
2	Tura (ST)	INC	Saleng A. Sangma	NPP	Agatha Sangma	AITC	Zenith Sangma

== Surveys and polls ==
=== Opinion polls ===
Polling agency	Date published	Margin of error				Lead
Polling agency	Date published	Margin of error	NDA	INDIA	Others	Lead
India Today-CVoter	February 2024	±3-5%	1	1	0	Tie
Times Now-ETG	December 2023	±3%	1-2	0-1	0	NDA
India TV-CNX	October 2023	±3%	2	0	0	NDA
Times Now-ETG	September 2023	±3%	1-2	0-1	0	NDA
Times Now-ETG	August 2023	±3%	1-2	0-1	0	NDA

=== Exit polls ===
Polling agency				Lead
Polling agency	NDA	INDIA	Others	Lead
Actual results	0	1	1	Tie

== Results ==
=== Results by alliance or party ===
Alliance/ Party		Popular vote			Seats		
Alliance/ Party		Votes	%	±pp	Contested	Won	+/−
INDIA	INC	580,103	34.05	▼14.62	2	1	Steady
VPP		569,156	33.40	New	1	1	▲1
NDA	NPP	412,741	24.22	▲1.77	2	0	▼1
Others		122,139	7.35		2	0	Steady
NOTA		16,753	0.98				
Total			100%	-	10	2	-

=== Results by constituency ===
Constituency		Turnout	Winner				Runner-up				Margin	
Constituency		Turnout	Party	Candidate	Votes	%	Party	Candidate	Votes	%	Votes	%
1	Shillong (ST)	73.78%▲	VPP	Ricky AJ Syngkon	5,71,078	55.02%	INC	Vincent Pala	1,99,168	19.19%	3,71,910	35.83%
2	Tura (ST)	81.37%▼	INC	Saleng A. Sangma	3,83,919	56.96%	NPP	Agatha Sangma	2,28,678	33.93%	1,55,241	23.03%

== Assembly segments wise lead of Parties ==
2024 Meghalaya Lok Sabha Elections Assembly Wise Leads Map

Party	Assembly segments	Position in the Assembly (as of 2026)	Last Assembly elections
INC	24	0	5
NPP	4	36	26
VPP	32	4	4
UDP	0	1	12
BJP	Did not contest	10	2
Others	0	9	9
Total	60		

== See also ==
- 2024 Indian general election in Mizoram
- 2024 Indian general election in Nagaland
- 2024 Indian general election in Odisha
