= Mohendro Rapsang =

Indian politician

Mohendro Rapsang (born 1963) is an Indian politician from Meghalaya. He is a former member of the Meghalaya Legislative Assembly from the West Shillong Assembly constituency in East Khasi Hills representing the Indian National Congress.

== Early life ==
Rapsong is from Shillong, East Khasi Hills district, Meghalaya. He is the son of the late KN Das. He completed his Pre University in commerce at Shillong Commerce College in 1983. He declared assets worth Rs.14 crore in his affidavit to the Election Commission of India.

== Career ==
Rapsong won the West Shillong Assembly constituency in the 2018 Meghalaya Legislative Assembly election representing the Indian National Congress. He polled 10,288 votes and defeated his nearest rival, Paul Lyngdoh of the United Democratic Party (Meghalaya) by 1,984 votes.

In February 2026, he reisgned from Natonal People's Party (NPP) and joined the Bharatiya Janata Party in June 2026. He quit the Indian National Congress before the 2023 election.
