= DFN =

DFN is a three letter acronym that may refer to:

- Dehcho First Nations, one of the First Nations of North Western Canada
- Desert Fireball Network, a fireball camera network based in Australia
- Deutsches Forschungsnetz, the German national research and education network
- <dfn>, Definition HTML tag
- Differential Frequency Noise (electronics)
- Dignity Freedom Network, formerly the Dalit Freedom Network
- Direct function (dfn), a way to define a function in the APL programming language
- Discrete Fracture Network model, a mathematical representation of fracture characteristics for hydromechanical numerical calculations in geology
- Doyle-Fuller-Newman model, a physics-based model used to predict the electrochemical dynamics of lithium-ion batteries
- Dual Flat No Lead, a style of integrated circuit package
