= Peter G. Marbaniang =

Indian politician

Member of Parliament, Lok Sabha
- In office 1989–1996
- Preceded by: George Gilbert Swell
- Succeeded by: George Gilbert Swell
- Constituency: Shillong Lok Sabha Constituency

Speaker, Meghalaya Legislative Assembly
- In office 24 February 1988 – 15 December 1989
- Preceded by: E.K Mawlong
- Succeeded by: Paty Ripple Kyndiah

President, All India Catholic Union
- In office 1994–1996
- Preceded by: Allan de Noronha
- Succeeded by: Norbert D'Souza

Personal details
- Born: 1 August 1939 Shillong
- Died: 29 September 1997 (aged 58) Shillong
- Party: Indian National Congress
- Spouse: Q.E Lyngdoh
- Children: Ampareen Lyngdoh, 9
- Education: Guwahati University

Peter Garnett Marbaniang was an Indian parliamentarian, legislator and academic from the state of Meghalaya. He served as a Member of the Lok Sabha from 1989 to 1996, as Speaker of the Meghalaya Legislative Assembly and as a Minister in the Government of Meghalaya. He was the President of the All India Catholic Union from 1994 to 1996.

== Political career ==
He was a member of the Meghalaya Legislative Assembly between 1972 and 1983. He served as a minister in the State government from 1975 to 1983. He was re-elected to the Meghalaya Legislative Assembly between 1988 and 1989, serving as Speaker of the Meghalaya Legislative Assembly. Peter Garnett Marbaniang represented the Shillong Constituency of Meghalaya from 1989 to 1996 in the Lok Sabha.

=== Lok Sabha ===
Peter Garnett Marbaniang represented the Shillong Lok Sabha Constituency of Meghalaya from 1989 to 1996 in the Lok Sabha He was elected from the Shillong constituency in 1988 to the Ninth Lok Sabha with 148,657 votes, or 50.77% of the total, running on the Indian National Congress ticket. He was re-elected in 1991 to the Tenth Lok Sabha with 144,895 votes, or 48.75% or the total.

In the Lok Sabha, he was a member of Committees on Public Accounts, Public Undertakings, Transport and Tourism, Business Advisory and General Purposes. He was nominated as a member of the panel of Chairmen of the Lok Sabha in 1992.

=== Meghalaya Legislative Assembly ===
Peter Garnett Marbaniang was a member of the Meghalaya Legislative Assembly between 1972 and 1983 and was re-elected to the Assembly between 1988 and 1989, serving as Speaker of the Meghalaya Legislative Assembly. During his tenure as a member of the House, he served as Chairman of the Estimates Committee of the Assembly.

He was part of the Indian Parliamentary Delegation to the 34th Commonwealth Parliamentary Conference in Canberra which was held between 14 and 25 September 1988. The Indian Delegation was led by Pratibha Devisingh Patil, the then Deputy-Chairman of the Rajya Sabha and also consisted of Dr. Najma Heptullah. The Conference discussed subjects including "International peace and security; AIDS: The nature of the disease, its spread, containment efforts, the role of Parliamentarians in helping contain the threat and Public Education Programme; Environmental protection in relation to population growth, industrialization and urbanization; and The Commonwealth response to superpower disarmament issues".

==== District Council ====
He was the Chairman of the Khasi Hills Autonomous District Council from 1975 to 1983. The Autonomous District Council is one of the three autonomous district councils within Meghalaya, and one of twenty-five autonomous regions of India. The Sixth Schedule of the Constitution of India allows for the formation of autonomous administrative divisions which have been given autonomy within their respective states.

== Christian leader ==
Marbaniang was a member of the All India Catholic Union (AICU). He was a vice-president during the tenure of Chhotebhai Noronha as president of the union (1990–1994), and in 1990 accompanied Chhotebhai in a meeting of minority leaders with prime minister Vishwanath Pratap Singh. Marbaniang served as President of the AICU from 1994 to 1996, being succeeded by Norbert D'Souza. In May 1995 Marbaniang promised to take up the question of introducing a Christian Marriage Bill in parliament. The purpose was to eliminate injustices in laws related to divorce and adoption by Christians.

In March 1996 the government failed to pass a bill that would extend special statutory benefits to Christians of Dalit origin. Marbaniang had met the prime minister at least ten times and asked repeatedly for the introduction of the Dalit bill. It was withdrawn on a procedural technicality. Marbaniang said the Congress party would have to pay "a heavy price for ignoring the four-decade-old Christian demand" in upcoming general elections. Marbaniang left the party, giving the "dictatorial attitude" of its leadership as his reason.

== Education ==
Peter G Marbaniang was educated at Guwahati University, where he received his M.A and LL.B.

== Interests ==
Marbaniang served as President of the Meghalaya Table Tennis Association and Meghalaya Volleyball Association.

== Legacy ==
Peter G. Marbaniang died in Shillong on 29 September 1997 at the age of 58. He was a member of the Meghalaya Legislative Assembly and Minister of Social Welfare in the State Government at the time of his death. His wife, Q.E. Lyngdoh, died on 20 January 2010 at the age of 71, leaving behind nine children and 19 grandchildren. His son, Robert G. Lyngdoh, was twice elected to the Meghalaya Legislative Assembly and served as Home Minister in the State Government . His daughter, Ampareen Lyngdoh, is a member of the Meghalaya Legislative Assembly who was a Cabinet Minister in the Government of Meghalaya.
