= Hoover Hynniewta =

Indian politician

Member of Parliament, Lok Sabha
- In office 1957–1962
- Preceded by: Bonily Khongmen
- Succeeded by: George Gilbert Swell
- Constituency: Autonomous District, Assam

Personal details
- Party: Independent

Hoover Hynniewta is an Indian politician. He was elected to the Lok Sabha, the lower house of the Indian Parliament, from Autonomous District constituency in Assam as an independent.
