= Ricky A. J. Syngkon =

Indian politician (1972–2026)

Ricky A.J. Syngkon

Member of Parliament, Lok Sabha
- In office June 2024 – 19 February 2026
- Preceded by: Vincent Pala
- Constituency: Shillong

Personal details
- Born: 6 January 1972 Sansaimitre Nongsder, Ri Bhoi, India
- Died: 19 February 2026 (aged 54) Shillong, Meghalaya, India
- Party: Voice of the People Party
- Education: North-Eastern Hill University

Ricky Andrew Jones Syngkon (6 January 1972 – 19 February 2026) was an Indian politician from Meghalaya. He was a member of the 18th Lok Sabha representing the Shillong constituency in the state of Meghalaya as a member of the Voice of the People Party (VPP). He was also the general secretary of the VPP.

== Early life and personal life ==
Ricky Andrew J. Syngkon was born to Sainbor Jones Syngkon and S. M. Tariang on 6 January 1972, in Sansaimitre Nongsder village in Ri-Bhoi district of Meghalaya. Syngkon got his MA in Economics, M.Com and Doctor of Philosophy in Economics, School Of Economics, Management and Information Sciences, North Eastern Hill University 2007. He was also an assistant professor in the Department of Commerce at North-Eastern Hill University.

He married Audrey, who passed away in 2019. They had no children. He is survived by one brother and two sisters.

== Political career ==
In the 2024 general election, Syngkon ran for the Shillong constituency as a member of the VPP. He won that seat and was elected to the 18th Lok Sabha, having defeated five other candidates, including the then MP, Vincent Pala of Indian National Congress by over 271,910 votes.

== Death ==
Syngkon died on 19 February 2026, at the age of 54, following a cardiac arrest whilst playing a futsal match.

Lok Sabha
Preceded by Vincent Pala	Member of Parliament for Shillong; 2024 - 2026	Succeeded by Vacant
