= Peter de Noronha =

Indian businessman (1897–1970)

Chevalier Peter Bertram Cypriano Castellino de Noronha KSG CE (19 April 1897 – 24 July 1970) was a businessman and civil servant of Kanpur, India. He was knighted by Pope Paul VI in 1965 for his work for the Christian community in India.

== Early history ==
Peter was born to Claudine Rachel de Noronha and William Constantine, a prominent Goan businessman in Kanpur who owned an auctioneering company. He received his early education from St Mary's High School, Bombay and later from St Joseph's College, Nainital. He excelled in academics and athletics and went on to join the Thomason College of Civil Engineering (the predecessor of IIT Roorkee). He received a gold medal (stood first in the university) in civil engineering in 1918 and won a scholarship for further research, which he refused.

== Civil engineer ==
After leaving Rourkee, he served in World War I in the King George's Own Royal Sappers and Miners where he received a service medal. After the war he joined the Public Works Department as a Class I Engineer (the highest rank).

He was instrumental in building the first bridge across the Ganges River at Haridwar at Har-ki-Pauri Ghat at Haridwar where a plaque in his honour was put up.

His team of engineers also invented a system of reinforced brickwork and flat roof system in the 1920 in Bihar. He resigned in 1926 to set up a new company P. Stanwill & Co. along with his brothers Willam and Stanley.

He was a keen golfer and soon became the captain of the local club. He was also adept in football, cricket and tennis. His favourite pastime though was bridge.

== Humanist ==
During World War II he served in the city's civil defence and later served in bridging the Hindu and Muslim communities during the Hindu-Muslim riots in the 1940s.

During the great Kanpur floods in 1950, he was instrumental helping save the lives of many trapped people and offering medical aid to the injured. For this he was awarded a certificate of merit by the District Magistrate of Kanpur.

He later donated an X-ray plant at the local Ursula Hospital for the poor and needy.

He was married twice, the first wife Linda, was the daughter of a prominent socialist from Jabalpur associated with Subhas Chandra Bose. They had two children before she died. He remarried again to a woman named Florence, with whom he had four children (including twins); their last child born when he was fifty-four.

Noronha wrote many books. Among them was The Pageant of Life (1964) in which a collection of this thoughts were penned.

== Religious pursuits ==
A devout Roman Catholic, his major contribution was through the Legion of Mary and became the first Indian to become a Legion envoy in the late 1930s. It was due to his efforts that the Legion spread over North India across Uttar Pradesh, Madhya Pradesh and Rajasthan. In 1962 he resigned from the Legion due to declining health. He singlehandedly ran the Catholic Information Centre and spread the Gospel.

In 1965 Pope Paul VI knighted him with the Order of St. Gregory the Great for meritorious services rendered to the country and the Catholic Church. He was also awarded the gold medal Pro Ecclesia et Pontifice.

Peter de Noronha died on 24 July 1970 after ailing for some time. His death saw condolence messages from all around the world and in India. Among them were from the then President of India, Varahagiri Venkata Giri; former president Sarvepalli Radhakrishnan; the governor of Uttar Pradesh, the Archbishop of Bombay, Cardinal Gracias, and the then Information Broadcasting Minister Inder Kumar Gujral, (later to be the Prime Minister of India).

His funeral was attended by six hundred city residents despite being during working hours and he was buried in the Lal Kurti Cemetery in Kanpur Cantonment. He is survived by his son Allan de Noronha who is a popular social worker in Kanpur.
