= Bajubon Kharlukhi =

Indian politician (died 2021)

Member of Parliament, Lok Sabha
- In office 1980-1984
- Preceded by: Hoping Stone Lyngdoh
- Succeeded by: George Gilbert Swell
- Constituency: Shillong, Meghalaya

Personal details
- Died: 2021 Shillong
- Party: All Party Hill Leaders Conference

Bajubon R Kharlukhi (died 2021) was an Indian politician. He was elected to the Lok Sabha, the lower house of the Parliament of India from the Shillong constituency of Meghalaya as a member of the All Party Hill Leaders Conference.
