= Maria Emilia Menezes =

President, All India Catholic Union
- In office 2000–2004
- Preceded by: Norbert D'Souza
- Succeeded by: John Dayal

Personal details
- Profession: Industrialist

Maria Emilia Menezes was President of the All India Catholic Union (AICU) from 2000 until 2004. She followed Norbert D'Souza and was succeeded by John Dayal.

Maria Emilia Menezes is an eminent industrialist in Goa. She was President of the AICU for four years. When elected in 2000 she was the first woman to hold that post. Soon after her election it was announced that Menezes and Ines Cotta Carvalho, Secretary General of the AICU, were planning to visit Kuwait, Bahrain, the U.A.E. and Oman in October 2000 to raise support for AICU activities. During her tenure the Union grew rapidly. She was an energetic fundraiser, determined to establish a Corpus Fund of one Crore rupees so the AICU would be able to support the Church and related organizations rather than asking them for support.

Following the 2002 Gujarat violence, Menezes and AICU vice-president John Dayal issued a statement in September 2002 voicing profound concern at events in the state. They said Chief Minister Narendra Modi and his rivals were involved in "an aggressive misuse of religious sentiments in their political campaigns". The statement said Modi and the Sangh Parivar were dismissing the pain of the survivors of the violence and raising fresh fears among minorities. Menezes was unanimously re-elected in September 2002. In her speech after reelection Menezes said the AICU would continue to stress growth of community leadership, and would look for increased participation from Dalits, women and young people. She said the AICU would focus on restoring the rights of Christians of Dalit origin, working at the state and national levels.

Speaking at the 49th Annual General Meeting of the Union in Chennai on 6 September 2003, Menezes said the AICU must reshape itself to better deal with "present political trends and turmoil within the Church". She said "It must harvest ideas and bring renewal in the Church and country". She said that "Proper formation of the laity for the distinctive role in the life and ministry of the Church must continue to be a priority".

Christians in India were in a somber mood in December 2008 after the anti-Christian violence in Orissa earlier that year and the Mumbai attacks on 26 November 2008. As past president of the AICU, Menezes said "Christmas is going to be as always. But the manner of celebrations should be different. In solidarity with their suffering brethren in Orissa, the Catholic community should suppress festivities and instead concentrate on the spiritual aspects of Christmas". She called on parishes throughout India to use the money they would have spent on Christmas to help their fellow-Christians who were suffering in Orissa. She said the response had been generally good, but not in Goa.
