= Jirang Assembly constituency =

Legislative Assembly constituency in Meghalaya State, India

Coordinates: 25.91°N 91.59°E

Jirang
- Constituency No. 10 for the Meghalaya Legislative Assembly

Constituency details
- Country: India
- Region: Northeast India
- State: Meghalaya
- District: Ri Bhoi
- Lok Sabha constituency: Shillong
- Established: 1978
- Total electors: 42,206
- Reservation: ST

Member of Legislative Assembly
- 11th Meghalaya Legislative Assembly
- Incumbent Sosthenes Sohtun
- Party: NPP
- Alliance: NDA
- Elected year: 2023

Jirang is one of the 60 Legislative Assembly constituencies of Meghalaya state in India. It is part of Ri Bhoi district and is reserved for candidates belonging to the Scheduled Tribes. As of 2023, it is represented by Sosthenes Sohtun of the National People's Party.

== Members of the Legislative Assembly ==
| Election | Name | Party |
|---|---|---|
| 1978 | Snomick Kalwing | Indian National Congress |
| 1983 | Gerson Lyngdoh | Hill State People's Democratic Party |
| 1988 | J. Dringwell Rymbai | Indian National Congress |
| 1993 | J. Dringwell Rymbai | Indian National Congress |
| 1998 | J. Dringwell Rymbai | Indian National Congress |
| 2003 | J. Dringwell Rymbai | Indian National Congress |
| 2008 | J. Dringwell Rymbai | United Democratic Party |
| 2013 | Lamboklang Mylliem | North East Social Democratic Party |
| 2018 | Sosthenes Sohtun | National People's Party |
| 2023 | Sosthenes Sohtun | National People's Party |

== Election results ==
=== Assembly Election 2023 ===
2023 Meghalaya Legislative Assembly election: Jirang
| Party | Candidate | Votes | % | ±% |
|---|---|---|---|---|
| NPP | Sosthenes Sohtun | 12,690 | 36.74% | ▲5.71 |
| INC | Adrian Lambert Mylliem | 11,067 | 32.04% | ▲1.74 |
| UDP | Badhok Nongmalieh | 4,107 | 11.89% | New |
| AITC | Sunmoon D. Marak | 3,928 | 11.37% | New |
| BJP | Riya Sangma | 2,075 | 6.01% | ▼7.64 |
| Independent | Forcaster Nongrang | 268 | 0.78% | New |
| Independent | Lee Trevor Bareh | 226 | 0.65% | New |
| NOTA | None of the Above | 315 | 0.91% | ▼0.65 |
| Margin of victory | | 1,623 | 4.70% | ▲3.98 |
| Turnout | | 34,536 | 81.83% | ▼2.85 |
| Registered electors | | 42,206 | | ▲17.52 |
| NPP hold | | Swing | ▲5.71 | |

=== Assembly Election 2018 ===
2018 Meghalaya Legislative Assembly election: Jirang
| Party | Candidate | Votes | % | ±% |
|---|---|---|---|---|
| NPP | Sosthenes Sohtun | 9,437 | 31.03% | ▲10.05 |
| INC | Witness Day Sancley | 9,217 | 30.31% | ▼1.37 |
| PDF | Lamboklang Mylliem | 6,351 | 20.88% | New |
| BJP | Badhok Nongmalieh | 4,152 | 13.65% | New |
| Independent | Comfort Doloi | 346 | 1.14% | New |
| NCP | Bity Jyrwa | 215 | 0.71% | New |
| NOTA | None of the Above | 475 | 1.56% | New |
| Margin of victory | | 220 | 0.72% | ▼9.36 |
| Turnout | | 30,411 | 84.67% | ▼2.84 |
| Registered electors | | 35,915 | | ▲26.99 |
| NPP gain from NESDP | | Swing | ▼10.73 | |

=== Assembly Election 2013 ===
2013 Meghalaya Legislative Assembly election: Jirang
| Party | Candidate | Votes | % | ±% |
|---|---|---|---|---|
| NESDP | Lamboklang Mylliem | 10,336 | 41.76% | New |
| INC | Barnabas Nongbah | 7,840 | 31.68% | ▲11.64 |
| NPP | Sosthenes Sohtun | 5,194 | 20.99% | New |
| LJP | Martin Lyngdoh | 562 | 2.27% | New |
| NCP | Abraham S. Sangma | 495 | 2.00% | ▼16.05 |
| UDP | Wonderlyne Lapang | 323 | 1.31% | ▼25.54 |
| Margin of victory | | 2,496 | 10.08% | ▲3.27 |
| Turnout | | 24,750 | 87.51% | ▼0.63 |
| Registered electors | | 28,281 | | ▲14.80 |
| NESDP gain from UDP | | Swing | ▲14.91 | |

=== Assembly Election 2008 ===
2008 Meghalaya Legislative Assembly election: Jirang
| Party | Candidate | Votes | % | ±% |
|---|---|---|---|---|
| UDP | J. Dringwell Rymbai | 5,830 | 26.85% | ▲7.58 |
| INC | William Mynsong | 4,350 | 20.03% | ▼7.85 |
| NCP | Laborious Manik S. Syiem | 3,919 | 18.05% | ▲6.13 |
| Independent | Balajied Ranee | 3,084 | 14.20% | New |
| Independent | Hepley Khonglah | 1,842 | 8.48% | New |
| Independent | Probin K. Raswai | 1,074 | 4.95% | New |
| MDP | Jemberson K. Marak | 868 | 4.00% | New |
| Margin of victory | | 1,480 | 6.82% | ▼1.80 |
| Turnout | | 21,715 | 88.15% | ▲26.35 |
| Registered electors | | 24,635 | | ▲9.19 |
| UDP gain from INC | | Swing | ▼1.04 | |

=== Assembly Election 2003 ===
2003 Meghalaya Legislative Assembly election: Jirang
| Party | Candidate | Votes | % | ±% |
|---|---|---|---|---|
| INC | J. Dringwell Rymbai | 3,888 | 27.89% | ▼24.03 |
| UDP | Artist Ranee | 2,687 | 19.27% | ▼6.76 |
| Independent | Oral Syngkli | 2,132 | 15.29% | New |
| NCP | Jriangsing Phanbuh | 1,661 | 11.91% | New |
| Independent | Nirjo Marak | 1,519 | 10.90% | New |
| PDM | Thre Nongrum | 709 | 5.09% | New |
| KHNAM | Snomick Kalwing | 453 | 3.25% | New |
| Margin of victory | | 1,201 | 8.61% | ▼17.26 |
| Turnout | | 13,942 | 61.90% | ▼1.67 |
| Registered electors | | 22,562 | | ▲5.31 |
| INC hold | | Swing | ▼24.03 | |

=== Assembly Election 1998 ===
1998 Meghalaya Legislative Assembly election: Jirang
| Party | Candidate | Votes | % | ±% |
|---|---|---|---|---|
| INC | J. Dringwell Rymbai | 7,058 | 51.91% | ▲3.49 |
| UDP | Micheal Giri Dkhar | 3,540 | 26.04% | New |
| HSPDP | Oral Syngkli | 1,984 | 14.59% | New |
| Independent | Medliton Nongrum | 748 | 5.50% | New |
| CPI | Marshal Wahlang | 220 | 1.62% | New |
| Independent | Dis Mawshai | 46 | 0.34% | New |
| Margin of victory | | 3,518 | 25.88% | ▲7.88 |
| Turnout | | 13,596 | 66.76% | ▼7.44 |
| Registered electors | | 21,424 | | ▲22.63 |
| INC hold | | Swing | ▲3.49 | |

=== Assembly Election 1993 ===
1993 Meghalaya Legislative Assembly election: Jirang
| Party | Candidate | Votes | % | ±% |
|---|---|---|---|---|
| INC | J. Dringwell Rymbai | 5,998 | 48.43% | ▲22.13 |
| HPU | Michael Giri Dkhar | 3,769 | 30.43% | ▲9.38 |
| Independent | Khrawbok Khongwar | 1,545 | 12.47% | New |
| Independent | Medliton Nangrum | 553 | 4.46% | New |
| Independent | Jogen A. Sangma | 233 | 1.88% | New |
| Independent | A. Blingtodar Diengdoh | 141 | 1.14% | New |
| AHL(AM) | R. W. Kharmawphlang | 105 | 0.85% | New |
| Margin of victory | | 2,229 | 18.00% | ▲12.75 |
| Turnout | | 12,386 | 74.34% | ▲11.86 |
| Registered electors | | 17,470 | | ▲29.44 |
| INC hold | | Swing | ▲22.13 | |

=== Assembly Election 1988 ===
1988 Meghalaya Legislative Assembly election: Jirang
| Party | Candidate | Votes | % | ±% |
|---|---|---|---|---|
| INC | J. Dringwell Rymbai | 2,095 | 26.29% | ▲2.45 |
| HPU | Gerson Lyngdoh | 1,677 | 21.05% | New |
| Independent | Snomick Kalwing | 1,656 | 20.78% | New |
| Independent | Rodess Roy Thangkhiew | 799 | 10.03% | New |
| Independent | Medliton Nongrum | 702 | 8.81% | New |
| HSPDP | Pingkisno Kylwing | 502 | 6.30% | ▼22.98 |
| PDC | Fransis C. Mawiong | 324 | 4.07% | ▲0.01 |
| Margin of victory | | 418 | 5.25% | ▼0.19 |
| Turnout | | 7,968 | 62.65% | ▲5.65 |
| Registered electors | | 13,497 | | ▲17.92 |
| INC gain from HSPDP | | Swing | ▼2.99 | |

=== Assembly Election 1983 ===
1983 Meghalaya Legislative Assembly election: Jirang
| Party | Candidate | Votes | % | ±% |
|---|---|---|---|---|
| HSPDP | Gerson Lyngdoh | 1,789 | 29.28% | ▲0.66 |
| INC | J. Dringwell Rymbai | 1,457 | 23.85% | ▼15.04 |
| Independent | Snomick Kalwing | 959 | 15.70% | New |
| APHLC | Elias Doloi | 866 | 14.17% | ▼4.98 |
| Independent | M. Mawroh | 336 | 5.50% | New |
| Independent | Chomillius Komon Mawiong | 298 | 4.88% | New |
| PDC | Dominik Draflyson Lyngdoh Mawnai | 248 | 4.06% | New |
| Margin of victory | | 332 | 5.43% | ▼4.83 |
| Turnout | | 6,110 | 59.28% | ▲4.65 |
| Registered electors | | 11,446 | | ▲23.95 |
| HSPDP gain from INC | | Swing | ▼9.61 | |

=== Assembly Election 1978 ===
1978 Meghalaya Legislative Assembly election: Jirang
| Party | Candidate | Votes | % | ±% |
|---|---|---|---|---|
| INC | Snomick Kalwing | 1,750 | 38.89% | New |
| HSPDP | Gerson Lyngdoh | 1,288 | 28.62% | New |
| APHLC | Rolingson Shadap | 862 | 19.16% | New |
| INC(I) | Mitchell Mawroh | 363 | 8.07% | New |
| Independent | B. Nagen Singh Lyngdoh | 237 | 5.27% | New |
| Margin of victory | | 462 | 10.27% | |
| Turnout | | 4,500 | 51.33% | |
| Registered electors | | 9,234 | | |
| INC win (new seat) | | | | |

== See also ==
- List of constituencies of the Meghalaya Legislative Assembly
- Ri Bhoi district
