= Mylliem Assembly constituency =

Legislative Assembly constituency in Meghalaya State, India

Mylliem
- Constituency No. 20 for the Meghalaya Legislative Assembly

Constituency details
- Country: India
- Region: Northeast India
- State: Meghalaya
- District: East Khasi Hills
- Lok Sabha constituency: Shillong
- Established: 1972
- Total electors: 37,369
- Reservation: ST

Member of Legislative Assembly
- 11th Meghalaya Legislative Assembly
- Incumbent Ronnie V. Lyngdoh
- Party: NPP
- Alliance: NDA
- Elected year: 2023

Mylliem is one of the 60 Legislative Assembly constituencies of Meghalaya state in India. It is part of East Khasi Hills district and is reserved for candidates belonging to the Scheduled Tribes. It falls under Shillong Lok Sabha constituency and its current MLA is Ronnie V. Lyngdoh of NPP.

== Members of the Legislative Assembly ==
Year	Name	Party
1972	Jormanik Syiem	All Party Hill Leaders Conference
1978	Lambourine Kharlukhi	Hill State People's Democratic Party
1983	Oris Lyngdoh	All Party Hill Leaders Conference
1988	Mohan Roy Kharkongor	Hill People's Union
1993	Pynshai Manik Syiem	All Party Hill Leaders Conference
1998	Pynshai Manik Syiem	Independent
2003	Pynshai Manik Syiem	Independent
2008	Ronnie V. Lyngdoh	Indian National Congress
2013	Ronnie V. Lyngdoh	Indian National Congress
2018	Hamletson Dohling	People's Democratic Front
2023	Ronnie V. Lyngdoh	National People's Party

== Election results ==
=== Assembly Election 2023 ===
2023 Meghalaya Legislative Assembly election: Mylliem
Party	Candidate	Votes	%	±%
INC	Ronnie V. Lyngdoh	8,904	28.92%	▼1.33
VPP	Aibandaplin F. Lyngdoh	8,866	28.79%	New
NPP	Hamletson Dohling	8,712	28.29%	New
UDP	Mitchel Wankhar	2,619	8.51%	New
Independent	Pynshai Manik Syiem	614	1.99%	New
AITC	Gilbert Guidingstar Laloo	566	1.84%	New
BJP	Samuel Hashah	435	1.41%	New
NOTA	None of the Above	248	0.81%	▼0.19
Margin of victory		38	0.12%	▼1.63
Turnout		30,791	82.40%	▼0.92
Registered electors		37,369		▲17.28
INC gain from PDF		Swing	▼3.08	

=== Assembly Election 2018 ===
2018 Meghalaya Legislative Assembly election: Mylliem
Party	Candidate	Votes	%	±%
PDF	Hamletson Dohling	8,493	31.99%	New
INC	Ronnie V. Lyngdoh	8,028	30.24%	▼7.77
HSPDP	Telinia S. Thangkhiew	6,629	24.97%	▲23.80
Independent	Ricky Shullai	1,951	7.35%	New
KHNAM	Banshailang Majaw	272	1.02%	New
Independent	Campbell Manick Syiem	138	0.52%	New
Independent	Bomber Singh Hynniewta	137	0.52%	New
NOTA	None of the Above	265	1.00%	New
Margin of victory		465	1.75%	▼6.72
Turnout		26,545	83.31%	▼0.33
Registered electors		31,862		▲25.52
PDF gain from INC		Swing	▼6.02	

=== Assembly Election 2013 ===
2013 Meghalaya Legislative Assembly election: Mylliem
Party	Candidate	Votes	%	±%
INC	Ronnie V. Lyngdoh	8,072	38.02%	▼9.43
Independent	Telinia S. Thangkhiew	6,274	29.55%	New
UDP	Hamletson Dohling	6,047	28.48%	▲21.13
Independent	Robert F. Kharbuki	590	2.78%	New
HSPDP	Bomber Singh Hynniewta	250	1.18%	▼1.51
Margin of victory		1,798	8.47%	▲1.11
Turnout		21,233	83.64%	▼3.21
Registered electors		25,385		▲14.59
INC hold		Swing	▼9.43	

=== Assembly Election 2008 ===
2008 Meghalaya Legislative Assembly election: Mylliem
Party	Candidate	Votes	%	±%
INC	Ronnie V. Lyngdoh	9,130	47.45%	▲25.77
NCP	Pynshai Manik Syiem	7,714	40.09%	▲38.66
UDP	T. Kharir	1,414	7.35%	▲3.44
HSPDP	Bomber Singh Hynniewta	517	2.69%	▼6.48
BJP	Dondor Singh Rumnong	466	2.42%	New
Margin of victory		1,416	7.36%	▼10.56
Turnout		19,241	86.86%	▲20.20
Registered electors		22,153		▲3.81
INC gain from Independent		Swing	▲7.85	

=== Assembly Election 2003 ===
2003 Meghalaya Legislative Assembly election: Mylliem
Party	Candidate	Votes	%	±%
Independent	Pynshai Manik Syiem	5,632	39.60%	New
INC	Oris Syiem Myriaw	3,083	21.68%	New
PDM	Sounder S. Cajee	2,848	20.02%	▼26.49
HSPDP	Larisha Kurkalang	1,304	9.17%	New
KHNAM	John Newman Puri	597	4.20%	New
UDP	Pherlin War	556	3.91%	New
NCP	Spar Lyngdoh	203	1.43%	New
Margin of victory		2,549	17.92%	▲13.79
Turnout		14,223	66.79%	▼8.37
Registered electors		21,339		▲9.27
Independent hold		Swing	▼11.05	

=== Assembly Election 1998 ===
1998 Meghalaya Legislative Assembly election: Mylliem
Party	Candidate	Votes	%	±%
Independent	Pynshai Manik Syiem	7,421	50.65%	New
PDM	Sounder S. Cajee	6,815	46.52%	New
BJP	A. Fillington R. Thangkhiew	415	2.83%	New
Margin of victory		606	4.14%	▼25.52
Turnout		14,651	77.45%	▼5.11
Registered electors		19,528		▲7.72
Independent gain from AHL(AM)		Swing		

=== Assembly Election 1993 ===
1993 Meghalaya Legislative Assembly election: Mylliem
Party	Candidate	Votes	%	±%
AHL(AM)	Pynshai Manik Syiem	8,063	55.50%	New
INC	Oris Lyngdoh	3,754	25.84%	▲4.03
HPU	H. Overkin Kharbangar	2,114	14.55%	▼11.88
Independent	Dentist Mohan Roy Kharkongor	597	4.11%	New
Margin of victory		4,309	29.66%	▲25.03
Turnout		14,528	81.47%	▲6.51
Registered electors		18,129		▲28.11
AHL(AM) gain from HPU		Swing	▲29.07	

=== Assembly Election 1988 ===
1988 Meghalaya Legislative Assembly election: Mylliem
Party	Candidate	Votes	%	±%
HPU	Dentist Mohan Roy Kharkongor	2,754	26.43%	New
INC	Oris Lyngdoh	2,272	21.81%	▲9.08
Independent	Pynshai Manik Syiem	2,058	19.75%	New
PDC	H. Alontis Roy Kharphuli	1,660	15.93%	▼14.00
HSPDP	Lambourne Kharlukhi	1,538	14.76%	▼1.33
Independent	Brall Singh Langstieh	137	1.31%	New
Margin of victory		482	4.63%	▲0.78
Turnout		10,419	75.23%	▼2.46
Registered electors		14,151		▲23.59
HPU gain from APHLC		Swing	▼7.35	

=== Assembly Election 1983 ===
1983 Meghalaya Legislative Assembly election: Mylliem
Party	Candidate	Votes	%	±%
APHLC	Oris Lyngdoh	2,943	33.78%	▲5.84
PDC	Dentist Mohan Roy Kharkongor	2,608	29.94%	New
HSPDP	Lambourne Kharlukhi	1,402	16.09%	▼13.91
INC	H. Alontis Roy Kharphuli	1,109	12.73%	▲1.34
Independent	Stonely A. Nongrum	383	4.40%	New
Independent	W. S. Roy Thangkhiew	168	1.93%	New
Independent	U. Toju Singh Giri Nongkhlaw	99	1.14%	New
Margin of victory		335	3.85%	▲1.78
Turnout		8,712	78.52%	▲3.54
Registered electors		11,450		▲19.95
APHLC gain from HSPDP		Swing	▲3.77	

=== Assembly Election 1978 ===
1978 Meghalaya Legislative Assembly election: Mylliem
Party	Candidate	Votes	%	±%
HSPDP	Lambourne Kharlukhi	2,078	30.01%	New
APHLC	Jor Manik Syiem	1,935	27.94%	▼16.03
Independent	J. E. Tariang	1,082	15.62%	New
INC	Franciswell Syiem	789	11.39%	New
Independent	Mawsing Kharsati	701	10.12%	New
Independent	S. A. Nongrum	302	4.36%	New
Independent	Hermon Kharkongar	38	0.55%	New
Margin of victory		143	2.06%	▼9.38
Turnout		6,925	74.42%	▲16.68
Registered electors		9,546		▲22.06
HSPDP gain from APHLC		Swing	▼13.96	

=== Assembly Election 1972 ===
1972 Meghalaya Legislative Assembly election: Mylliem
Party	Candidate	Votes	%	±%
APHLC	Jor Manik Syiem	1,921	43.97%	New
Independent	Francis Syiem	1,421	32.52%	New
Independent	Lambourne Kharlukhi	1,027	23.51%	New
Margin of victory		500	11.44%	
Turnout		4,369	57.32%	
Registered electors		7,821		
APHLC win (new seat)				

== See also ==
- List of constituencies of the Meghalaya Legislative Assembly
- Shillong (Lok Sabha constituency)
- East Khasi Hills district
