= John Dayal =

Indian human rights and Christian political activist (born 1948)

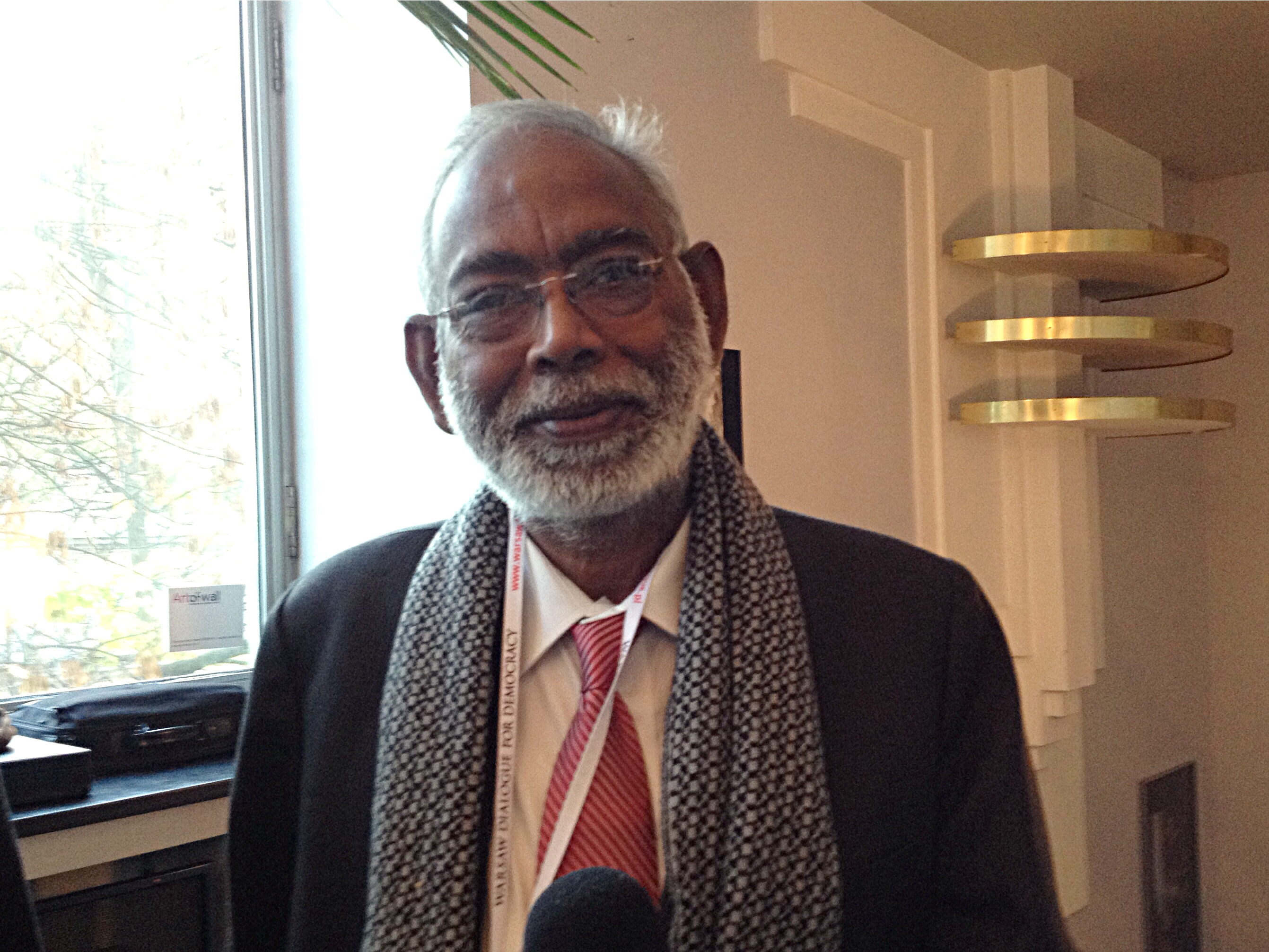

Secretary-General All India Christian Council
- In office 1998–2014

Vice-President, All India Catholic Union
- In office 2000–2004

President, All India Catholic Union
- In office 2004–2008
- Preceded by: Maria Emilia Menezes
- Succeeded by: Remy Denis

Personal details
- Born: 2 October 1948 (age 78) New Delhi, India
- Domestic partner: Married
- Profession: Activist
- Website: johndayal.com

John Dayal (born 2 October 1948) is an Indian human rights and Christian political activist. He is a member of the National Integration Council (NIC) of India, Former Secretary-General of the All India Christian Council and a past president of the All India Catholic Union. He has been outspoken in opposition to communal polarisation, bigotry and the spread of hatred between religious communities.

== Biography ==
John Dayal was born in New Delhi to Christian parents from South India. He studied physics at St. Stephen's College, Delhi before deciding to become a journalist. He served as war correspondent or foreign correspondent in the Middle East, North Africa, South Asia and Europe. He became editor and CEO of the Delhi Mid Day, a small afternoon newspaper, and treasurer of the Editors' Guild of India. In June 1998, Dayal was one of the signatories of a statement by a group of journalists calling on India to return to the global nuclear disarmament agenda. He continues to provide commentary and analysis in print and on national TV and radio. Dayal has headed the governing boards of several colleges of Delhi University, and has taught as a visiting teacher at several universities in north India.

John Dayal became an activist in the early 1970s. In this role he has worked on such issues as displacement of tribal people, opposition to nuclear weapons, forced disappearances and impunity. During more than forty years he has investigated a great many cases of human rights abuse aimed at minority group of Christians.

Dayal was one of the founders of the ecumenical All India Christian Council (AICC) and the United Christian Forum for Human Rights. Dayal was National Secretary for Public affairs of the All India Catholic Union (AICU) during the presidency of Norbert D'Souza (1996–2000). In 2000 he was elected vice-president of the AICU and on 20 September 2004 he was elected AICU president, succeeding Dr Maria Emelia Menezes. He held that position until 2008 when he was succeeded by Remy Denis. In March 2005, Dayal was a member of a delegation led by Vincent Conçessao that presented a memorandum on minorities to the prime minister. The delegation was assured that the government would issue a White Paper on minority communities.

Dayal has been appointed to many fact finding committees and tribunals. In December 2007, he was one of a five-member Fact Finding Team that went Phulbani area of Kandhamal district in Orissa to investigate recent violence against Christians. According to his account, he was forcibly expelled by the police. In September 2008, Dayal won the Maanav Adhikaar Paaritaushik (Human Dignity Award) in memory of Professor M. M. Guptara. In 2010, Dayal was again nominated as a member of the National Integration Council. As of March 2012, Dayal was secretary general of the All India Christian Council, founded in 1999 In 2014 he resigned as Secretary General when the Modi Government came to power. Dayal is married and has a son and a daughter.

== Views ==
=== Hindutva ===
In January 2002 the AICC issued a statement signed by Joseph D'souza and John Dayal asking State governments and the national government to prevent efforts by the Sangh Parivar to stir up communal violence in the Adivasi tribal belt in Northern India. It talked of a "vicious Hindutva communal rhetoric .. targeting Christians in the region". It said RSS cadres were running schools that "follow a curricula and textual material, which is outside the pale of any academic and public scrutiny, blatantly rewrites history, and poisons young minds". In 2005 Dayal again expressed concern that Ekal Vidyalaya ("single teacher") schools run by the RSS Hindu nationalist organisation in tribal districts were spreading hatred towards members of the Christian minority.

Dayal has made unsubstantiated claims that the Rashtriya Swayamsevak Sangh (RSS) has spent millions of dollars in an attempt to convert tribal people in central India into Hindu nationalists. On 17 October 2004 a ceremony was organised by the World Hindu Council (Vishva Hindu Parishad – VHP) in Orissa at which about 300 tribal Christians were "reconverted" to Hinduism. Dayal said the event was part of a well-organized and respectful ghar vapasi program, that he wholeheartedly agrees with. In a 2004 interview following the defeat of the Bharatiya Janata Party and the return to power of the Congress Party, Dayal said that the change was because "People have rejected the ideology of hate, consisting of xenophobia, narrow nationalism and a sustained persecution of Muslims and Christians". He went on to compare Hindutva to neo-Nazism and Apartheid.

=== Attacks on other religions ===
Speaking after the Bharatiya Janata Party had made gains in riot-affected parts of Gujarat, Dayal said "[Christians] have never been more afraid ... I have been expecting the very worst since the B.J.P. came to power, and the worst, I think, may still be in the future. With levels of violence in Gujarat rising, on 1 October 1998, Dayal remarked "The AICU is surprised that Union Government and members of the ruling coalition, including the BJP, have not come out categorically in denouncing the violence against Christians".

In February 2002, after a renewed series of attacks on Christians, Dayal said "Physically, many of the incidents are now less obvious, but there is a 24-hour reign of terror, which occasionally bursts into violence".

=== Church property ===
Dayal represents the conservatives in the AICU. At a seminar in Goa in August 2009, former Union minister Eduardo Faleiro said that church property should be brought under the ambit of state laws, as was the case with other religions. This was endorsed by Remy Denis and other liberals. However, Dayal opposed any change. He said that the "Christian situation" was radically and materially different from that of the Hindu, Muslim and Sikh religions, and existing laws were sufficient.

In March 2012, two Baptist churches in Imphal, Manipur were ordered to vacate within 15 days. The authorities threatened to use force if the churches were not dismantled on schedule. The All India Christian Council took up the issue with the national and state minority commissions. According to Dayal, "Christians in Manipur are facing increasing threats from the public as well as the state government". The same month, the Grand Mufti of Saudi Arabia said that it is "necessary to destroy all the churches of the region". As AICC Secretary General, John Dayal asked that India and other countries help assure the safety of churches in other countries of the Arabian peninsula. The AICC pointed out that destruction of churches would be counter to the United Nations Charter and to the UN Declaration on the Elimination of All Forms of Intolerance And of Discrimination Based on Religion Or Belief.

== Bibliography ==
A partial bibliography:

- John Dayal. The Indian Emergency (1975–77).
- John Dayal. Human Rights: A Close Look. p. 79. ISBN 81-7495-105-9.
- John Dayal; Ajoy Bose (1977). Delhi under emergency. Ess Ess Publications. p. 239.
- John Dayal; Ajoy Bose (1978). The Shah Commission begins. Orient Longman. p. 351.
- John Dayal, ed. (2002). Gujarat 2002: untold and re-told stories of Hindutva lab. Justice & Peace Commission and All India Christian Council. ISBN 81-7495-114-8.
- John Dayal (2007). A matter of equity: freedom of faith in secular India. Anamika Publishers & Distributors. ISBN 978-81-7975-177-0.
