= West Shillong Assembly constituency =

Legislative Assembly constituency in Meghalaya State, India

Coordinates: 25.59°N 91.85°E

West Shillong
- Constituency No. 18 for the Meghalaya Legislative Assembly

Constituency details
- Country: India
- Region: Northeast India
- State: Meghalaya
- District: East Khasi Hills
- Lok Sabha constituency: Shillong
- Established: 2008
- Total electors: 27,329
- Reservation: None

Member of Legislative Assembly
- 11th Meghalaya Legislative Assembly
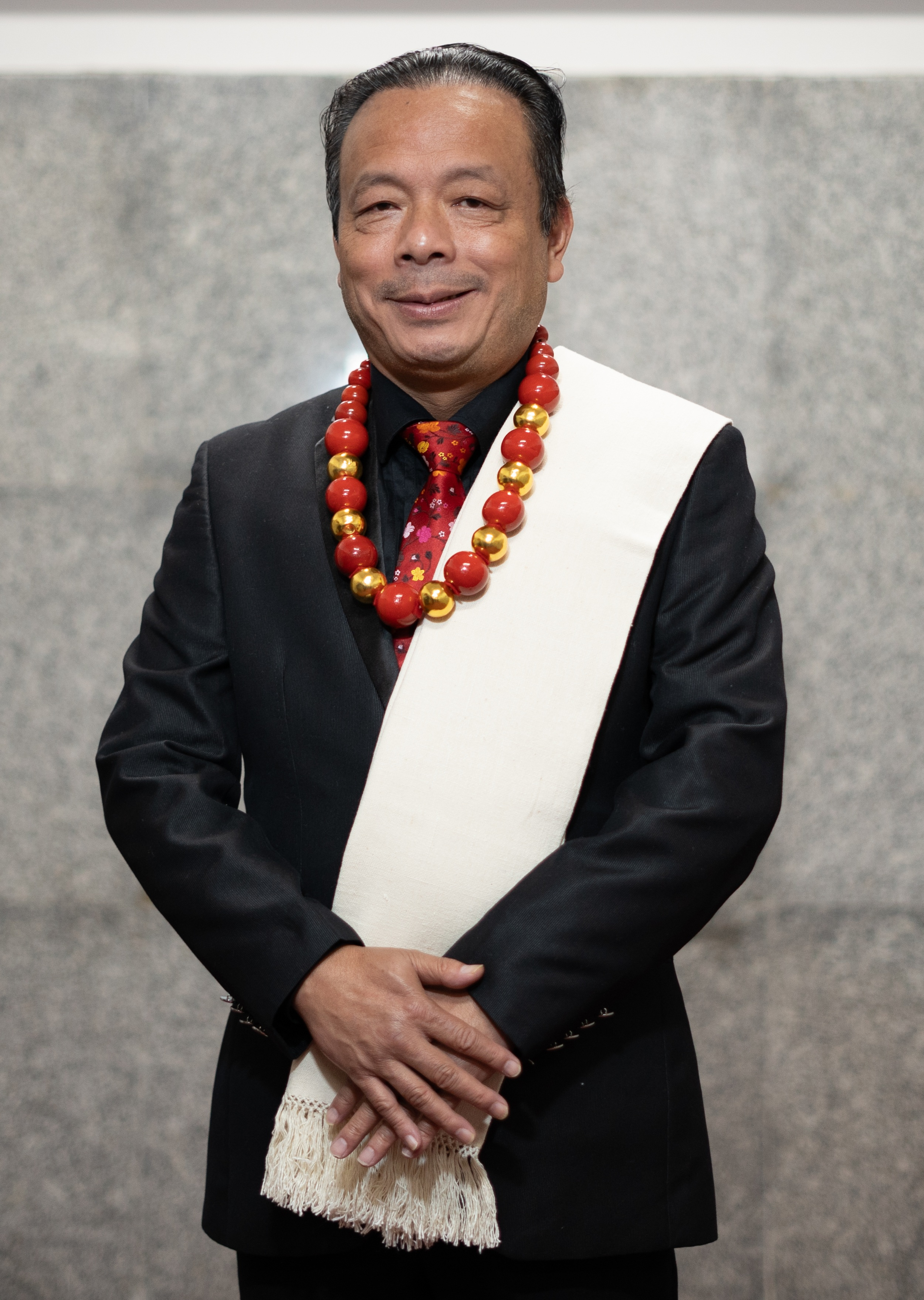
- Incumbent Paul Lyngdoh
- Party: UDP
- Alliance: NDA
- Elected year: 2023

West Shillong is one of the 60 Legislative Assembly constituencies of Meghalaya state in India. It is part of East Khasi Hills district. It falls under Shillong Lok Sabha constituency and its current MLA is Paul Lyngdoh of United Democratic Party.

== Members of the Legislative Assembly ==
Election	Member	Party
2013	Paul Lyngdoh	United Democratic Party
2018	Mohendro Rapsang	Indian National Congress
2023	Paul Lyngdoh	United Democratic Party

== Election results ==
=== Assembly Election 2023 ===
2023 Meghalaya Legislative Assembly election: West Shillong
Party	Candidate	Votes	%	±%
UDP	Paul Lyngdoh	7,917	42.60%	▲0.19
NPP	Mohendro Rapsang	4,432	23.85%	▲22.92
BJP	Ernest Mawrie	3,771	20.29%	New
VPP	Raja Jyrwa	1,859	10.00%	New
INC	Bethleen Dkhar	417	2.24%	▼50.30
AITC	Iwan Maria	187	1.01%	New
NOTA	None of the Above	204	1.10%	▲0.07
Margin of victory		3,485	18.75%	▲8.62
Turnout		18,583	68.00%	▼7.94
Registered electors		27,329		▲6.00
UDP gain from INC		Swing	▼9.95	

=== Assembly Election 2018 ===
2018 Meghalaya Legislative Assembly election: West Shillong
Party	Candidate	Votes	%	±%
INC	Mohendro Rapsang	10,288	52.55%	▲4.62
UDP	Paul Lyngdoh	8,304	42.41%	▼8.12
Independent	Donaldson Shanpru	189	0.97%	New
NPP	Havergail Edwina Bareh	182	0.93%	New
NOTA	None of the Above	201	1.03%	New
Margin of victory		1,984	10.13%	▲7.53
Turnout		19,578	75.94%	▼3.24
Registered electors		25,782		▲10.53
INC gain from UDP		Swing	▲2.01	

=== Assembly Election 2013 ===
2013 Meghalaya Legislative Assembly election: West Shillong
Party	Candidate	Votes	%	±%
UDP	Paul Lyngdoh	9,333	50.54%	New
INC	Mohendro Rapsang	8,852	47.93%	New
Independent	Donaldson Shanpru	283	1.53%	New
Margin of victory		481	2.60%	
Turnout		18,468	79.17%	
Registered electors		23,326		
UDP win (new seat)				

== See also ==
- List of constituencies of the Meghalaya Legislative Assembly
- Shillong (Lok Sabha constituency)
- East Khasi Hills district
