= All India Catholic Union =

Indian Catholics

Regions with significant populations
- India: 16 million

Religions
- Catholic Church

Website
- aicu.in

The All India Catholic Union (AICU) represents almost 16 million Catholics in India: followers of the Latin Church, the Syro-Malabar Catholics and the Syro-Malankara Catholics. It has 120 diocese and district units. The AICU was established in 1930.

== History ==
Plans for an organised union of Catholic laity were discussed at the All India Catholic Conference in 1919. The All India Catholic League was formed in 1930 (with C. J. Varkey, Chunkath as Secretary) and sponsored the All India Catholic Congress at Pune in 1934. The body was named the Catholic Union of India in 1944, with Professor M. Ratnaswamy of Anna Malai University as the first National President. The Catholic Union of India was registered at Chennai in 1966, and later changed its name to the All India Catholic Union.

On 30 October 1945, the All India Conference of Indian Christians (AICIC), which had both Protestant and Catholic members, formed a joint committee with the Catholic Union of India that passed a resolution stating that, "in the future constitution of India, the profession, practice and propagation of religion should be guaranteed and that a change of religion should not involve any civil or political disability." This joint committee enabled the Christians in India to stand united, and in front of the British Parliamentary Delegation "the committee members unanimously supported the move for independence and expressed complete confidence in the future of the community in India." The office for this joint committee was opened in Delhi, in which the Vice-Chancellor of Andhra University M. Rahnasamy served as President and B.L. Rallia Ram of Lahore served as General Secretary. Six members of the joint committee were elected to the Minorities Committee of the Constituent Assembly of India. In its meeting on 16 April 1947 and 17 April 1947, the joint committee of the All India Conference of Indian Christians and All India Catholic Union prepared a 13 point memorandum that was sent to the Constituent Assembly, which asked for religious freedom for both organisations and individuals; this came to be reflected in the Constitution of India.

Following the partition of India, the Catholic Union of India granted independence to its branches in Sind and Baluchistan in its Second Annual General Meeting in Bangalore in October 1947, which was presided by Ruthnasamy.

== Presidents of the All India Catholic Union ==
Presidents of the Union have included Prof. M. Ratnaswamy, Madras, Chev. A. Soares, Bombay, Chev. J. C. Rayon, Bangalore, Chev. D. V. D. Monte, Madras, Chev. G. S. Reddy, Hyderabad, Mr. George Menezes, Bombay (1986–90), Mr. Chhotebhai, Kanpur (1990–94), Mr. Peter Marbaniang, Shillong (1994–96), Mr. Norbert D'Souza, Pune (1996–2000), Dr. Maria Emilia Menezes (2000–2004)

== Dayal presidency ==
John Dayal was elected president of the Union on 20 September 2004, succeeding Dr Maria Emilia Menezes. In 2005 Dayal expressed concern that Ekal Vidyalaya ("single teacher") schools run by the Rashtriya Swayamsevak Sangh (RSS) Hindu nationalist organisation were spreading hatred towards members of the Christian minority. In May 2006 the union called on State and Central governments to take urgent action to protect the Christian community following escalating violence in states controlled by the Bharatiya Janata Party (BJP) and allied parties, including armed demonstrations by the RSS.

In December 2007 the AICU petitioned Prime Minister Manmohan Singh's to intervene and stop the attacks that were being made against Christians in the Phulbani area of Orissa. According to their memo: "The official apathy, the police indifference and the freedom allowed to marauding bands of Hindutva fanatics and armed thugs in Gujarat has been repeated in Orissa in what is a planned conspiracy against the church and our faith". The AICU said that recent attacks could not have occurred "without the complicity of the official machinery and the backing of powerful political groups".

== Denis presidency ==
Dr. Remy Denis became president in 2008. Denis has taken a somewhat radical position in saying that the clergy should confine itself to ministering to the spiritual needs of the people. Administration of the material goods of the church should be left entirely to the laity. At a seminar in Goa in August 2009, former Union minister Eduardo Faleiro said that church property should be brought under the ambit of state laws, as was the case with other religions. This was endorsed by Remy Denis and other liberals. However John Dayal, representing the conservatives in the AICU, opposed any change. He said that the "Christian situation" was radically and materially different from that of the Hindu, Muslim and Sikh religions, and existing laws were sufficient.

In February 2012 the AICU announced that it had started planning for a Laity Synod, to be held later in the year. This would be the first time such an event had been arranged in India. It would give the lay members an opportunity to think about their role in the church and the future of the church. According to Remy Denis "The Second Vatican Council called for the empowerment of the laity. But after 50 years, there is not much to show". It was hoped that the synod would help find ways for the laity to become more involved in management of the financial and temporal affairs of the church.
