= Remy Denis =

Indian mathematician

President, All India Catholic Union
- Incumbent
- Assumed office 2008
- Preceded by: John Dayal

Personal details
- Profession: Professor of Mathematics

Remy Denis is an Indian mathematician who was elected president of the All India Catholic Union (AICU) in September 2008, succeeding John Dayal. He was reelected at the annual general meeting of the AICU held in Mangalore in September 2010.

Denis was a professor in the Department of Mathematics at Gorakhpur University in Uttar Pradesh. In the 1980s, Denis was a member of the Uttar Pradesh Minorities Commission.

Denis has taken a somewhat radical position in saying that the clergy should confine itself to ministering to the spiritual needs of the people. Administration of the material goods of the church should be left entirely to the laity. At a seminar in Goa in August 2009, former Union minister Eduardo Faleiro said that church property should be brought under the ambit of state laws, as was the case with other religions. This was endorsed by Denis and other liberals. However John Dayal, representing the conservatives in the AICU, opposed any change. He said that the "Christian situation" was radically and materially different from that of the Hindu, Muslim and Sikh religions, and existing laws were sufficient.

In February 2012 the AICU announced that it had started planning for a Laity Synod, to be held later in the year. This would be the first time such an event had been arranged in India. It would give the lay members an opportunity to think about their role in the church and the future of the church. According to Denis "The Second Vatican Council called for the empowerment of the laity. But after 50 years, there is not much to show". It was hoped that the synod would help find ways for the laity to become more involved in management of the financial and temporal affairs of the church.
