= Norbert D'Souza =

Norbert DeSouza

President, All India Catholic Union
- In office 1996–2000
- Preceded by: Peter G. Marbaniang
- Succeeded by: Maria Emilia Menezes

Personal details
- Profession: Railway engineer

Norbert D'Souza is a railway engineer and trainer from Pune who was president of the All India Catholic Union (AICU) for four years. The AICU represents almost 16 million Catholics in India, including followers of the Latin Rite, the Syro Malabar Catholics and the Syro Malankara Catholics. He held office from 1996 to 2000, succeeding Peter G. Marbaniang and succeeded by Maria Emilia Menezes.

In September 1992 as vice-president of the AICU western region D'Souza participated in a three-day conference that discussed changes to the Christian Personal Law relating to marriage, divorce and adoption. The current laws did not recognize a divorce granted by a priest, and did not allow Christians to legally adopt for succession purposes. Also, Dalit Christians were not treated as members of scheduled castes, although Sikhs and Buddhists of Dalit origin were. It was agreed to campaign for changes to these laws.

As secretary of the AICU, D'Souza observed that Christians had traditionally been strong supporters of the Congress party, but only because no other party had taken interest in them. He noted that the Hindu nationalist RSS still claimed that Christians were anti-national because they had cooperated with the British.

In March 1998 D'Souza was a member of a fact-finding committee of the Indian People's Tribunal on Environmental and Human Rights that investigated attacks on a group of 200 Christian pilgrims in Maharashtra state. In February and March 1998 there were a series of attacks on Christians across India. Hindutva organizations were claiming Christians were practicing "forced conversions" and called for additional laws requiring that any conversions be reported to a district magistrate. Such laws already existed in Orissa and Madhya Pradesh. Norbert D'Souza stated that "The experience of Orissa shows that such a legislation is completely superfluous because no cases in violation of the Act have been brought to the notice of the courts". He went on to say of Madhya Pradesh that "The cases of harassment against Christians include hauling the parents (second generation Christians) baptising their child to court. Therefore, now I will definitely allege that this legislation is malafide in intent".

During D'Souza's term as President of the AICU the National Secretary for Public affairs was John Dayal, who later became vice-president and then president of the AICU.
