= Ronnie V. Lyngdoh =

Indian politician

Leader of the Opposition Meghalaya Legislative Assembly
- In office 9 June 2023 – 28 August 2024
- Preceded by: Mukul Sangma
- Succeeded by: Mukul Sangma

Member of the Meghalaya Legislative Assembly
- Incumbent
- Assumed office March 2023
- Preceded by: Hamletson Dohling
- Constituency: Mylliem
- In office 2008–2018
- Preceded by: Pynshai Manik Syiem
- Succeeded by: Hamletson Dohling
- Constituency: Mylliem

Personal details
- Born: Meghalaya, India
- Party: [National People's Party
- Other political affiliations: Indian National Congress

Ronnie V. Lyngdoh is an Indian politician from Meghalaya. He currently serving as member of the Meghalaya Legislative Assembly representing Mylliem. He belongs to the National People's Party. He was also the leader of opposition in Meghalaya Legislative Assembly from 2023 to 2024.
