= Allan de Noronha =

Indian writer (born 1951)

President, All India Catholic Union
- In office 1990–1994
- Preceded by: George Menezes
- Succeeded by: Peter G. Marbaniang

Personal details
- Born: 1951 (age 74–75)

Allan de Noronha (born 1951), commonly called Chhotebhai, is an Indian writer who was president of the All India Catholic Union (AICU) from 1990 to 1994.

== Biography ==
Allan de Noronha is from a Goan family that for generations had been based in Kanpur. He was born in 1951, son of Peter and Florence de Noronha. He later assumed the name "Chhotebhai" by which he is known in public life and in literary circles.

Chhotebhai was elected national president of the AICU in May 1990. In July 1990 two nuns were raped in Gajraula, and Noronha was invited to meet the prime minister Vishwanath Pratap Singh to discuss what action should be taken. Later that month he again met Singh when leading a huge rally in support of gaining special rights for Dalit Christians. The marriage of Christians in India was regulated by the Indian Christian Marriage Act 1872 and the Indian Divorce Act 1869. These two acts were outdated and unfair to women, and the Christian Marriage and Matrimonial Causes Bill 1990 was proposed as a replacement. Chhotebhai was told that the legislation would be enacted once there was unanimity on the bill among Christians. His AICU took the initiative and called a joint meeting with the All India Christian People's Forum (AICPF) at which a consensus formula was found on which the different churches and organizations could agree. Changes to the Christian Adoption and Maintenance Bill were also proposed.

On 10 April 1992 Chhotebhai called on the minister in April 1992 to ask about the progress of the bills. He was told they had been forwarded to the welfare ministry. He was also told that the Catholic Bishops' Conference of India had submitted an alternative proposal. The matter stalled. In May 1995 Chhotebhai's successor as AICI president, the MP Peter G. Marbaniang, was promising to take up the question of introducing a Christian Marriage Bill in parliament. In April 2000 the government was planning to introduce "Christian Marriage Bill 2000". As convenor of Christian Personal Laws for the AICU, Chhotebhai Noronha welcomed the decision. He said "previous laws were male-oriented, but provisions in this bill are pro-women...I would say this is a sincere attempt by the government for the social upliftment of the women".

In October 2009 Chhotebhai Noronha was elected president of the Kanpur Catholic Association (KCA) for a two-year term. On 20 December 2009 the KCA held its annual Christmas Milan and Inter-Religious Prayer for Peace. It was attended by leaders of the Hindu, Muslim, Sikh, Buddhist, Jain, Parsi, Bahá'í and Protestant communities. Chhotebhai was AICU Spokesperson for the 2010–2011 period. In July 2011 the Delhi High Court caused controversy when it validated the marriage of two first cousins after they had converted from the Hindu religion to Christianity. As spokesman for the AICU, Chhotebhai said "The Catholic Church expressly forbids the type of marriage validated by the Delhi High Court". Chhotebhai said it had been wrong of the couple to misuse the act of conversion for the sake of getting married.

In February 2012 a new TV series in the Hindi language called "Masihi Satsang" (A Christian Search for Truth) began to be broadcast across India. The series was directed by Chhotebhai (Noronha).

== Views ==
Chhotebhai has said that following the Second Vatican Council there are three functions for a priest: to proclaim the word, minister the sacraments and build communities. He has bluntly stated of the Catholics in Goa, "Ironically, Goa has the second highest literacy rate in the country, and an influential number of Catholics. Unfortunately, the most corrupt politicians... are Catholics!" On the issue of celibacy of priests, he has said "... Let us then accept the wisdom of the Lord, and his Church, and make celibacy optional, not intrinsic, to the priesthood. The contingencies of the time also demand it. It would be the safer and saner way". Chhotebhai discussed the impact of the Second Vatican Council (1962–65) in a talk he gave in May 2010 at St. Patrick’s Church Cantonment in Kanpur. He said the emphasis now was on the local Church, with local language, culture, resources and vocations. In his view the former hierarchical structure had been replaced by a more egalitarian concentric model.

== Bibliography ==
- Chhotebhai (1978). The Trinity and Me: (through Trinitarian Interaction). St Paul Publications. p. 69.
- Chhotebhai (2000). Beyond 2000: The other side. Gujarat Sahitya Prakash. ISBN 8187886110.
- Chhotebhai. (2011). An unfinished symphony. Delhi : Media House. p. 304. ISBN 9789374953983.
