= Lamboklang Mylliem =

Indian politician

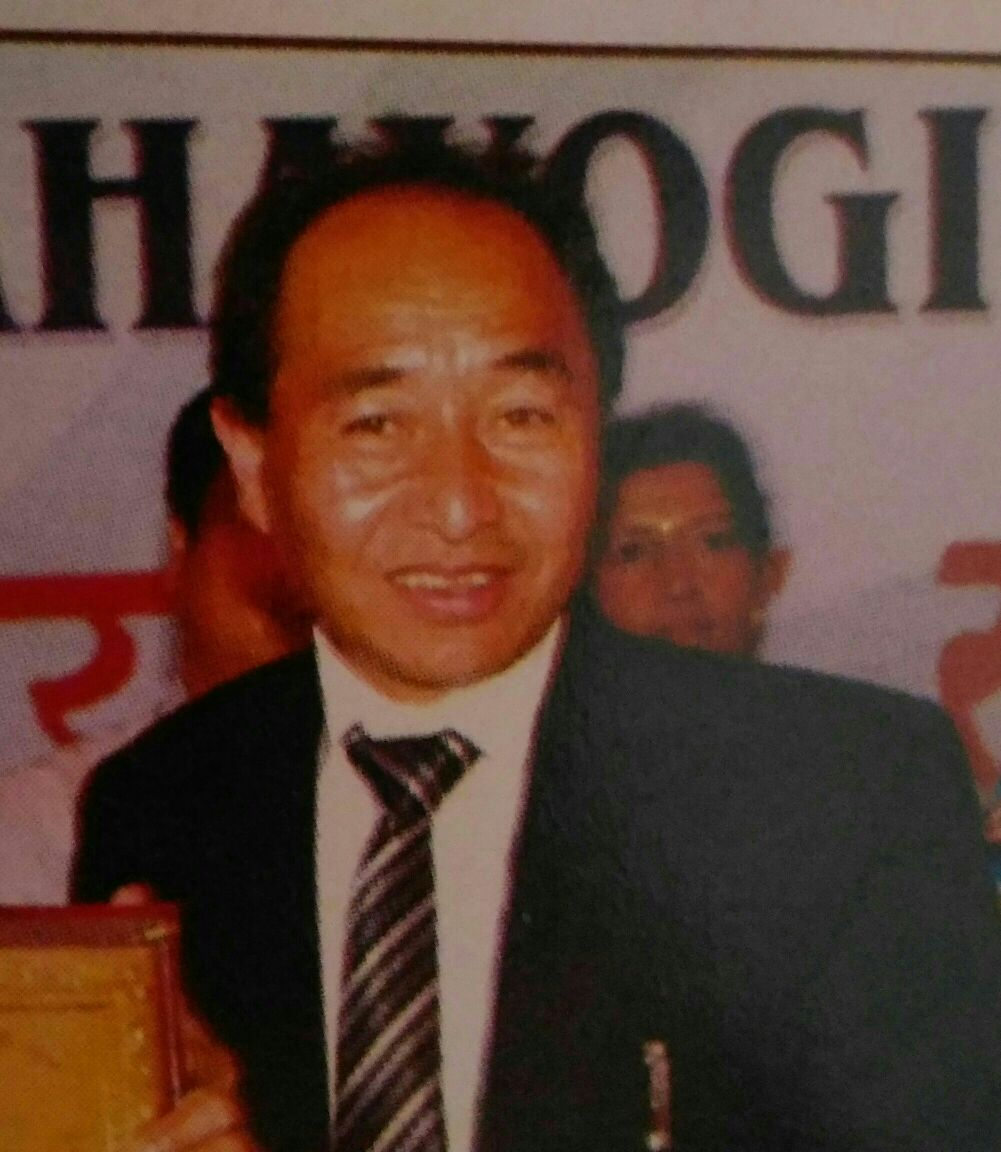
- Mylliem in 2014

Member of the Meghalaya Legislative Assembly
- In office 2013–2018
- Succeeded by: Sosthenes Sohtun
- Constituency: Jirang

Personal details
- Born: Shillong
- Party: North East Social Democratic Party
- Education: High School Leaving Certificate, MBOSE, 1983

Lamboklang Mylliem is an Indian politician from Meghalaya. He represented the Jirang constituency as a member of the North East Social Democratic Party.
