= Paty Ripple Kyndiah =

Indian politician (1928–2015)

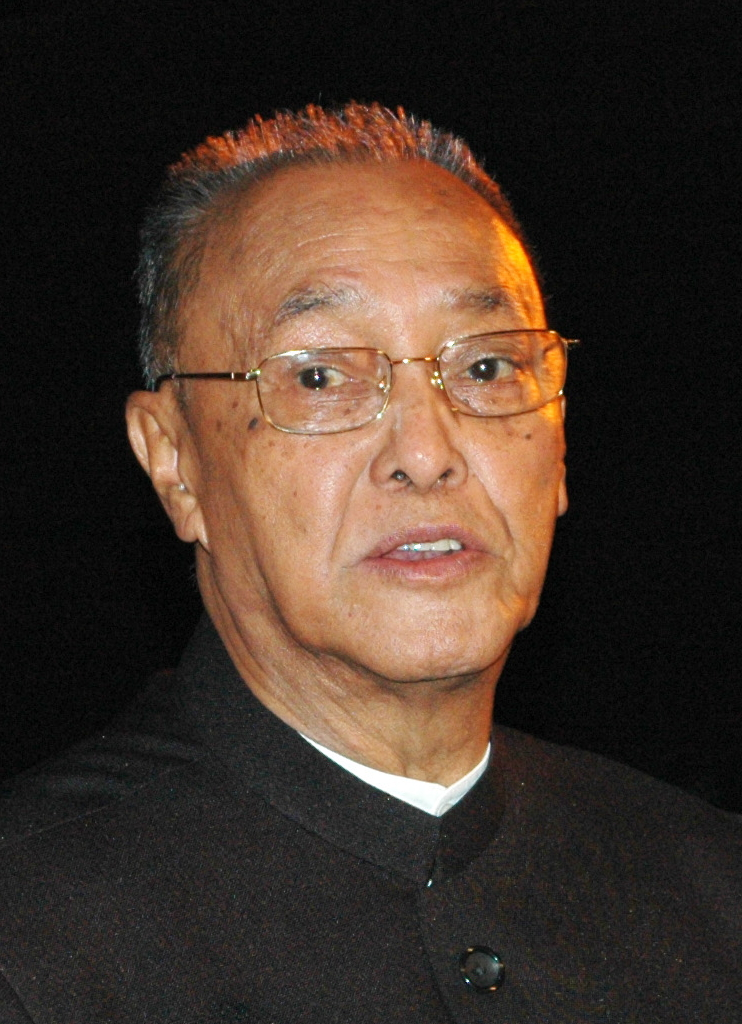
- Paty Ripple Kyndiah in 2006

Union Minister of Tribal Affairs
- In office 23 May 2004 – 22 May 2009
- Prime Minister: Manmohan Singh
- Preceded by: Jual Oram
- Succeeded by: Kantilal Bhuria

Union Minister of Development of North Eastern Region
- In office 23 May 2004 – 24 October 2006
- Prime Minister: Manmohan Singh
- Preceded by: C. P. Thakur
- Succeeded by: Mani Shankar Aiyar

Governor of Mizoram
- In office 10 February 1993 – 28 January 1998
- Chief Minister: Lal Thanhawla
- Preceded by: Swaraj Kaushal
- Succeeded by: Arun Prasad Mukherjee

Speaker of the Meghalaya Legislative Assembly
- In office 20 December 1989 – 9 February 1993
- Preceded by: P. G. Marbaniang
- Succeeded by: J. D. Rymbai

Member of Parliament, Lok Sabha
- In office 1998 – 16 May 2009
- Preceded by: George Gilbert Swell
- Succeeded by: Vincent Pala
- Constituency: Shillong

Personal details
- Born: 7 May 1928 Shillong, British India (now Meghalaya, India)
- Died: 26 March 2015 (aged 86) Shillong, Meghalaya, India
- Party: Indian National Congress
- Spouse: Gavvy Khyriem
- Children: 5

Paty Ripple Kyndiah (7 May 1928 – 26 March 2015) was an Indian politician and a member of the Indian National Congress party who served as a member of the 12th, 13th and 14th Lok Sabha representing the Shillong constituency of Meghalaya. He served as the Minister of Tribal Affairs between 2004 and 2009 in the cabinet of Prime Minister Manmohan Singh.

== Early and personal life ==
Paty Ripple Kyndiah was born on 7 May 1928 in Shillong in British India (now Meghalaya, India). He completed his graduation from Gauhati University in Guwahati, Assam. He married his wife Gavvy Khyriem in 1948 and was father to five children.

He died on 26 March 2015 at the age of 86 in Shillong.

== Political career ==
Kyndiah was a member of the Indian National Congress party from the beginning of his political career. In 1970, he was elected as a member of the Meghalaya Legislative Assembly from the Jaiaw constituency and remained as its member till 1993. He was appointed as a cabinet minister in the Government of Meghalaya in 1975 and served on four occasions between 1975 and 1988. He served as the Leader of the Opposition in the Meghalaya Legislative Assembly between 1979 and 1981 and briefly acted as the Chief Minister of Meghalaya in 1987.

In 1989, he was elected as the Speaker of the Meghalaya Legislative Assembly and remained in office until February 1993 when he was appointed as the Governor of Mizoram to succeed Swaraj Kaushal who had resigned from office. He served as the governor of Mizoram till 1998 when he stepped down from office upon completion of his tenure. Following his retirement as governor, he re-joined active politics and was elected to the 12th Lok Sabha on an Indian National Congress ticket to represent the Shillong constituency. He was subsequently re-elected to the 13th Lok Sabha in 1999 and the 14th Lok Sabha in 2004. As a member of parliament, he served as a member of the Committee on Transport and Tourism, Committee on Public Undertakings, Committee on Petitions, Committee on Urban and Rural Development, the Committee on Estimates, the Committee on Defence, and the Consultative Committee of the Ministry of Information Technology.

Upon his re-election to the Lok Sabha in 2004 and following the victory of the United Progressive Alliance in the general election, he was appointed as a cabinet minister in the cabinet of Prime Minister Manmohan Singh. He was appointed as the Minister of Tribal Affairs and the Minister of Development of North Eastern Region on 22 May 2004. He held the position of the Minister of Tribal Affairs till the expiration of the term of the 14th Lok Sabha in 2009 while he relinquished the charge of the Minister of Development of North Eastern Region to Mani Shankar Aiyar in October 2006.

Lok Sabha
Preceded by George Gilbert Swell	Member of Parliament for Shillong; 1998 – 2009	Succeeded by Vincent Pala
Political offices
Preceded by Swaraj Kaushal	Governor of Mizoram; 10 February 1993–28 January 1998	Succeeded by Arun Prasad Mukherjee
Preceded by Jual Oram	Minister of Tribal Affairs; 23 May 2004–22 May 2009	Succeeded by Kantilal Bhuria
Preceded by C. P. Thakur	Minister of Development of North Eastern Region; 23 May 2004–22 May 2009	Succeeded by Mani Shankar Aiyar
