= Paul Lyngdoh =

Indian politician and poet

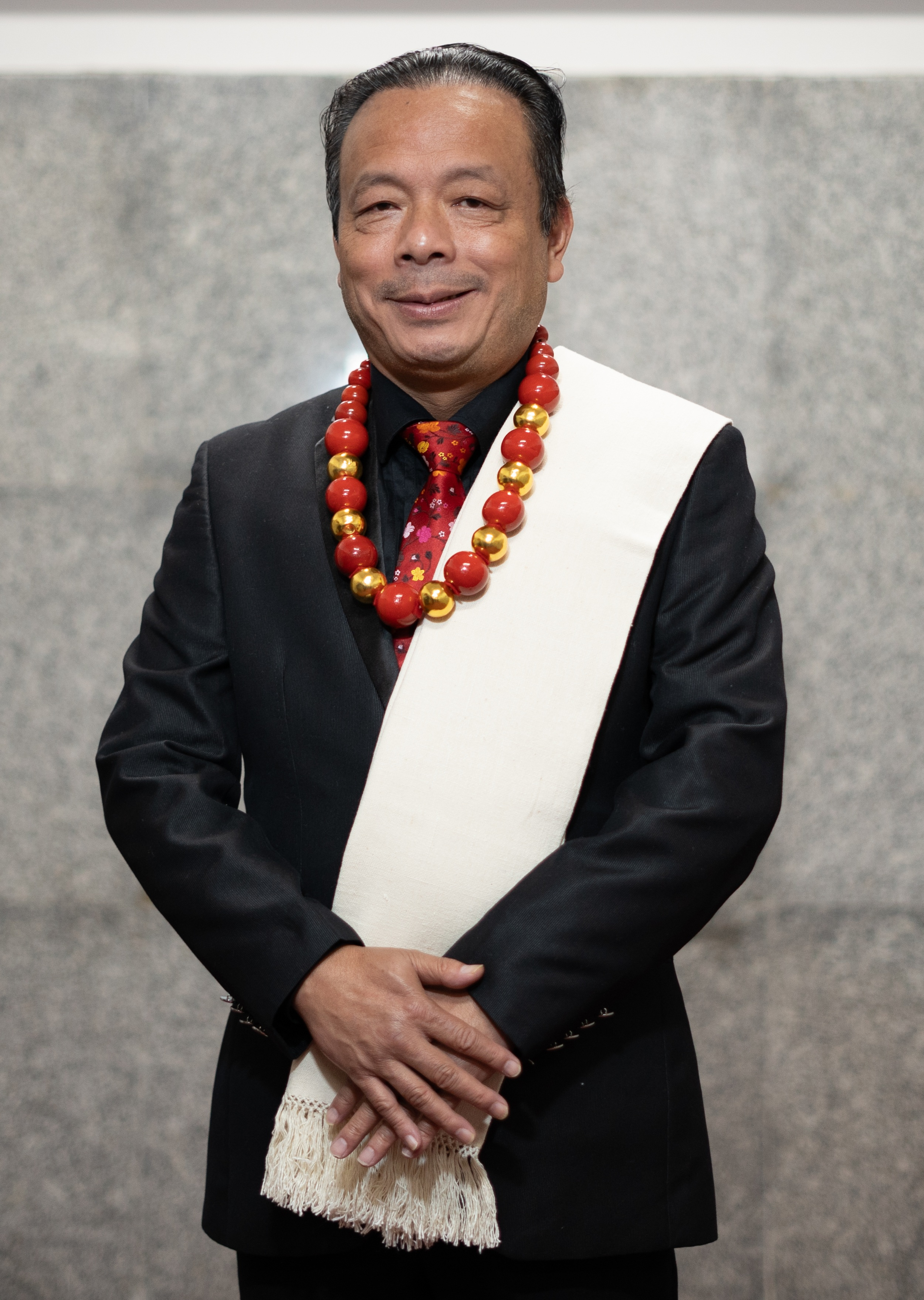

Minister of Social Welfare, Tourism, Arts & Culture, Textiles, Government of Meghalaya
- Incumbent
- Assumed office 7 March 2023

Member of the Meghalaya Legislative Assembly for West Shillong
- Incumbent
- Assumed office 7 March 2023
- Preceded by: Mohendro Rapsang

Personal details
- Party: United Democratic Party
- Other political affiliations: Khun Hynniewtrep National Awakening Movement

Paul Lyngdoh (born 22 September 1972) is an Indian politician, poet, author, songwriter and musician from Shillong, Meghalaya.

As of 2023, he is the working president of the United Democratic Party. He is currently serving as Cabinet Minister of the Government of Meghalaya He is a member of the 11th House of the Meghalaya Legislative Assembly, as well as the MDC representing Jaiaw Constituency in the Khasi Hills Autonomous District Council.

== Educational qualifications ==
Paul Lyngdoh completed his schooling at Khasi Jaintia National School and Mawprem Modern Higher Secondary School. He pursued his Bachelor's Degree (with English Honours) from St. Anthony's College, Shillong, followed by a Master's Degree in English from North-Eastern Hills University. He studied law up to the intermediate level and completed a course on journalism from the Indian Institute of Journalism.

== Literary career ==
Paul Lyngdoh is a bilingual writer (Khasi and English). His collection of short stories Shithiar Ki Khana Lyngkot (1989), which he wrote as a high-school student, is now part of the Higher Secondary School Curriculum of the Meghalaya Board of School Education (MBOSE), Meghalaya Board of School Education, while his bilingual collection of poems, Floodgate / Ka Kyrdop was published whilst he was in college. His poetry has been published in journals and anthologies like the 'Indian Literature' (Sahitya Akademi), 'Poetry Chronicle' (edited by Sanjiv Bhatia), 'The Telegraph Sunday Magazine' (edited by Jayanta Mahapatra), 'Dancing Earth' and 'Anthology and Contemporaru Poetry from the North-East (both edited by Kynpham Nongkynrih and Robin Ngangom), amongst others. Khushwant Singh introduced Lyngdoh to a wider audience through a review of Shillong-based poets in The Sunday Observer (1995).

Lyngdoh's latest work, A Return to Poetry, was published in 2018.

== Music career ==
Lyngdoh has also written songs, many of which continue to be popular anthems to this day. Some of his songs include 'Ri Lum', 'Ri Baieid i Pa i Mei', 'Mait Shaphrang', 'Ko Khun U Hynniew Trep', 'Ka Jingkhot ka Por' etc.

Lyngdoh is a vocalist and musician, and continues to perform with his band.

== Student leadership ==
Lyngdoh was involved in the Khasi Students Union for more than a decade, holding the position of General Secretary and also President from 1994 to 2002.

== Political career ==
Lyngdoh was elected to the Meghalaya Legislative Assembly in 2003 as well as 2008 representing the Khun Hynniewtrep National Awakening Movement, which he founded.

He again won the MLA elections from 18 West Shillong Constituency representing the United Democratic Party in 2013. He was elected to the Khasi Hills Autonomous District Council in 2019 from the Jaiaw Constituency.

He is currently the Working President of the United Democratic Party.

Lyngdoh was elected as the MLA of 18 West Shillong Constituency on 2 March 2023 and was also sworn in as the Cabinet Minister of the Govt. of Meghalaya on 7 March 2023, in the presence of the Prime Minister of India, Narendra Modi.

As a Cabinet Minister, Paul Lyngdoh is currently holding the portfolios of Social Welfare, Tourism, Arts & Culture, and Textiles. He is also the Spokesperson of the MDA 2.0, Govt. of Meghalaya.
