= George Gilbert Swell =

Indian academic, politician and diplomat (1923–1999)

5th Deputy Speaker of the Lok Sabha
- In office 9 December 1969 – 18 January 1977
- Speaker: G. S. Dhillon & Bali Ram Bhagat
- Preceded by: R.K.Khadilkar
- Succeeded by: Godey Murahari

Member of Parliament, Lok Sabha
- In office 1962–1977
- Preceded by: Bonily Khongmen
- Succeeded by: Biren Singh Engti
- Constituency: Autonomous District, Assam
- In office 1984–1989
- Preceded by: Bajubon Kharlukhi
- Succeeded by: Peter G. Marbaniang
- In office 1996–1998
- Preceded by: Peter G. Marbaniang
- Succeeded by: Paty Ripple Kyndiah
- Constituency: Shillong, Meghalaya

Member of Parliament, Rajya Sabha
- In office 1990–1996
- Constituency: Meghalaya

Personal details
- Born: 5 August 1923 Laitkynsew, Khasi Hills, Assam, British India
- Died: 25 January 1999 (aged 75) Shillong, Meghalaya, India
- Education: Scottish Church College; University of Calcutta

George Gilbert Swell (5 August 1923 – 25 January 1999) was an Indian college professor, politician and diplomat. He was deputy speaker of Lok Sabha and its member from Shillong in Meghalaya.

== Early life ==
He was born at Laitkynsew village near Cherrapunji in the present-day state of Meghalaya. He completed his earlier years of schooling at the Ramakrishna Mission School at Cherrapunji. After passing the Bachelor of Arts examination from the Scottish Church College, Kolkata, he completed his Master of Arts degree in English from the University of Calcutta in 1946. Within months thereafter, he married Lajopthiaw Lyngdoh, second daughter of Phrolibon Lyngdoh and Wellington Kearney. Soon after, their first child, Lakyntiew, was born in 1947, followed by a son, Sanbor, in 1950. In 1952, they moved to Ethiopia, part of a cadre of instructors recruited to teach in Ethiopia in the early 1950s. Swell taught English at the high school level. They returned to Shillong in 1956, and Swell worked as a professor of English at several Shillong area colleges. Swell contributed to the formation of the state of Meghalaya, breaking away from the parent state of Assam. He, with his wife's uncle, Brington B Lyngdoh, and Stanley Nichols Roy, as well as other community leaders, conducted a campaign for the separate identity of their proposed state which would combine the peoples of the Khasi and Janintia Hills and other tribes from the Garo Hills and adjacent areas. Swell then moved into national politics.

== Political career ==
Swell was elected to the Lok Sabha from the Autonomous Districts (Lok Sabha) constituency in 1962, 1967 and 1971 and from the Shillong (Lok Sabha) constituency in 1984 and 1996. He was the deputy speaker of the Lok Sabha from 9 December 1969 to 27 December 1970 in the 4th Lok Sabha and again 27 March 1971 to 18 January 1977.

Swell served as India's ambassador to Norway and Iceland from 1977 to 1980 (appointed by PM Moraji Desai), and Burma, 1980 to 1984 (appointed by PM Indira Gandhi). Subsequently, he was appointed as ambassador-designate to Canada, then Spain, but instead chose to return to national political life in India. In 1985, as a member of parliament, he served as the head of the Indian delegation to the United National General Assembly, New York. In 1992 he contested the Indian presidential election as a joint opposition candidate against Shankar Dayal Sharma but lost. He was member of the Rajya Sabha (upper house of Parliament) from Meghalaya during 1990–1996.

The worsening health of his wife, Lajopthiaw, who died in early 1998, was a factor in his withdrawal from political life.

== Death ==
Swell died on 25 January 1999. His daughter, Lakyntiew Lyngdoh Watrous, and his granddaughter, Yarissa Lyngdoh Sommer, established a museum in the town of his birth, Laitkynsew, in 2016.
