= P. B. M. Basaiawmoit =

Indian politician

P. B. M. Basaiawmoit is a minority rights activist especially concerned with indigenous people and Christians in Meghalaya and India, more generally. As of the mid-1980s he was the chairman of the KJP Synod Jingiaseng Samla. As president of the Heritage, Environment and Status Protection Organisation (Hespo), he led campaigns against uranium mining in Domiasiat in Meghalaya. He has served as convenor of the Khasi Jaintia Environment Protection Council. As of 2013 he served as Vice President of the National Council of Churches in India.

He contested the Shillong Lok Sabha seat in the 2009 Indian general election as a candidate of the Hill State People's Democratic Party. He finished in third place with 97,613 votes (20.32% of the votes in the constituency).

He took part in the 2014 Indian general election as the candidate of the Common People's Front (albeit standing as an independent candidate on the ballot) in the Shillong seat. His candidature was supported by the HSPDP and the Khun Hynniewtrep National Awakening Movement, as well as some independent Members of the Legislative Assembly of Meghalaya. Ahead of the election he presented a 15-point manifesto, which included opposition to anti-conversion laws, creating smaller states, repeal of the Armed Forces (Special Powers) Acts, demanding extension of the Sixth Schedule of the Constitution of India to all the tribal areas across the country, advocacy for rights for Christian Dalits, review of RTE Act, reform of legislation on foreign funding for NGOs, review of the Look East Policy, right to informed consent of local populations prior to launching natural resource projects and introduction of the right to recall elected officials. Basaiawmoit finished in second place with 168,961 votes, getting 27% of the 6,19,987 votes polled in Shillong (Lok Sabha constituency).
