= Meghalaya Pradesh Congress Committee =

Indian political party

- President: Vincent Pala
- Chairman: Saleng A. Sangma
- Headquarters: Congress Bhawan, Thana Road, Shillong-793001, Meghalaya
- Youth wing: Meghalaya Youth Congress
- Women's wing: Meghalaya Pradesh Mahila Congress Committee
- Ideology: Populism; Social liberalism; Democratic socialism; Social democracy; Secularism
- ECI status: A State Unit of Indian National Congress
- Alliance: Indian National Developmental Inclusive Alliance
- Seats in Rajya Sabha: 0 / 1
- Seats in Lok Sabha: 1 / 2
- Seats in Meghalaya Legislative Assembly: 0 / 60

Election symbol

The Meghalaya Pradesh Congress Committee (or MPCC) is the unit of the Indian National Congress for the state of Meghalaya, India. It is responsible for organizing and coordinating the party's activities and campaigns within the state, as well as selecting candidates for local, state, and national elections in Meghalaya. Its head office is situated at the Congress Bhawan, Thana Road in Shillong. The present President of Meghalaya Pradesh Congress Committee is Vincent Pala.

== Meghalaya Legislative Assembly election ==
Year	Party leader	Seats won	Change in seats	Outcome
1972		9 / 60	▲ New	Opposition
1978	Williamson A. Sangma	20 / 60	▲10	Opposition later Government
1983	Williamson A. Sangma	25 / 60	▲5	Opposition later Government
1988	Purno A. Sangma	22 / 60	▼3	Government
1993	S. C. Marak	24 / 60	▲2	Government
1998	S. C. Marak	25 / 60	▲1	Government Later Opposition
2003	D. D. Lapang	22 / 60	▼3	Government
2008	Mukul Sangma	25 / 60	▲3	Government
2013	Mukul Sangma	29 / 60	▲4	Government
2018	Mukul Sangma	21 / 60	▼8	Opposition
2023	Vincent H Pala	5 / 60	▼16	Opposition

== Performance in Lok Sabha Elections ==
Lok Sabha Elections
Year	Lok Sabha	Seats contested	Seats won	(+/-) in seats	% of votes	Vote swing	Popular vote	Outcome
1977	6th	2	1 / 2	New entry	35.92%	New entry	91,255	Opposition
1980	7th	1	1 / 2	Steady	74.31%	▲38.39	82,307	Government
1984	8th	2	2 / 2	▲1	62.42%	▼11.89	2,49,266	Government
1989	9th	2	2 / 2	Steady	55.38%	▼7.04	2,64,210	Opposition
1991	10th	2	2 / 2	Steady	56.62%	▲1.24	2,81,562	Government
1996	11th	2	1 / 2	▼1	53.64%	▼2.98	3,53,327	Opposition
1998	12th	2	2 / 2	▲1	47.62%	▼6.02	3,99,583	Opposition
1999	13th	2	1 / 2	▼1	32.75%	▼14.87	2,14,324	Opposition
2004	14th	2	1 / 2	Steady	45.55%	▲12.80	3,09,233	Government
2009	15th	2	1 / 2	Steady	44.84%	▼0.71	3,68,801	Government
2014	16th	2	1 / 2	Steady	37.93%	▼6.91	4,08,925	Opposition
2019	17th	2	1 / 2	Steady	48.28%	▲10.35	6,60,114	Opposition
2024	18th	2	1 / 2	Steady	34.05%	▼14.23	5,80,103	Opposition

== Structure and Composition ==
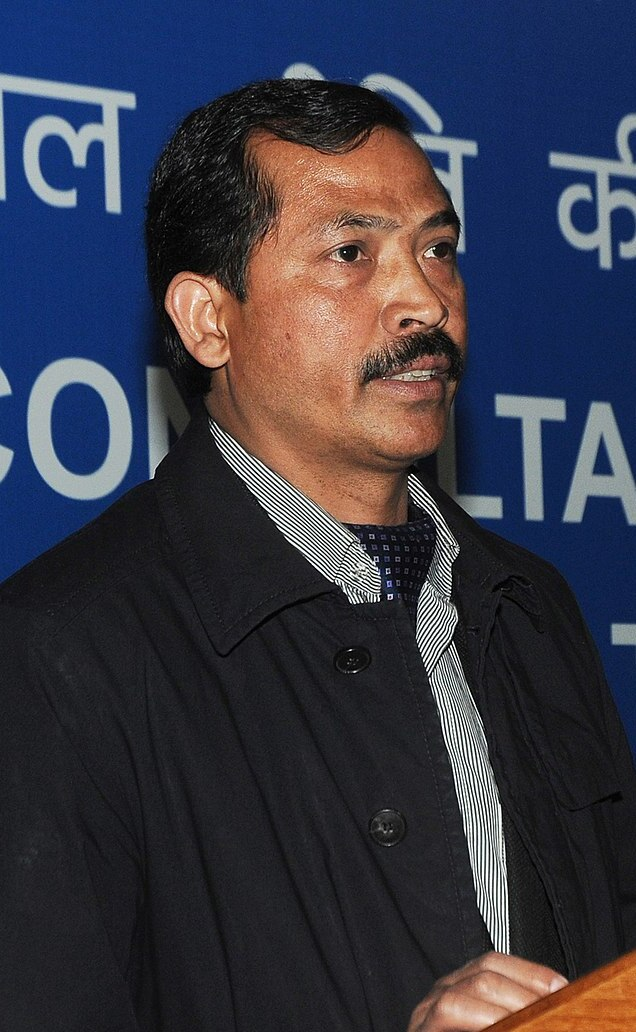
S.No.	Name	Designation	Incharge
01	Vincent Pala	President	Meghalaya Pradesh Congress
02	Sanjay Das	General Secretary	Meghalaya Pradesh Congress
03	Deborah Marak	Working President	Meghalaya Pradesh Congress
04	khranglin lyngkhoi tbn	Working President	Meghalaya Pradesh Congress

== List of presidents ==
S.no	President	Portrait	Term	
1.	Williamson A. Sangma		1970	1972
2.	P. A. Sangma		1972	1977
3.	S. C. Marak		1992	1993
4.	O. L. Nongtdu		1996	2000
(3).	S. C. Marak		2000	April 2005
(4).	O. L. Nongtdu		April 2005	September 2008
5.	Friday Lyngdoh		September 2008	23 April 2012
6.	D. D. Lapang		23 April 2012	30 December 2017
7.	Celestine Lyngdoh		30 December 2017	25 August 2021
8.	Vincent H Pala		25 August 2021	Incumbent

== List of Current Members in Meghalaya Legislative Assembly ==
The party has no elected members in the state assembly as of August 2025.

== See also ==
- Indian National Congress
- Congress Working Committee
- All India Congress Committee
- Pradesh Congress Committee
