= Arun Prasad Mukherjee =

Indian administrator

Governor of Mizoram
- In office 29 January 1998 – 1 May 1998

Personal details
- Born: 29 December 1933
- Died: 13 October 2020 (aged 86)

Arun Prasad Mukherjee was an Indian former administrator and governor of Mizoram. An officer of Indian Police Service, Mukherjee, became the director of Central Bureau of Investigation (CBI) and director general of West Bengal Police. After retirement he became the advisor to Union Home Minister Indrajit Gupta in 1997. Mukherjee was appointed governor of Mizoram on 29 January 1998 and served until 1 May 1998. Mukherjee is also an author known for his academic pursuit. In 2017 he was awarded Banga Bibhushan by the government of West Bengal.
