= Joseph D'souza =

Indian Christian missionary and human rights activist

Most Reverend Joseph D'souza
- Occupations: Moderator Bishop of the Good Shepherd Church of India, CEO of Operation Mobilisation-India, President of the All India Christian Council,
- Known for: Champion of Quality Education for All in India
- Notable work: Establishing 100+Schools providing economically challenged urban & rural children access to affordable english medium education
- Style: Most Reverend
- Title: The Right Reverend
- Movement: Continuing Anglican
- Spouse: Mariam D'souza
- Children: 1

Joseph D'souza is an Indian bishop, missionary, and Christian and Dalit rights activist. In 2025, he is International President of the Dignity Freedom Network (DFN) (previously known as Dalit Freedom Network), President of the All India Christian Council (AICC).

On 30 August 2014, he was consecrated as Archbishop of the Good Shepherd Church of India, and associated ministries.

In 2024, he was CEO of Operation Mobilisation - India (not affiliated with Operation Mobilisation, International).

== Early life and education ==
Joseph D'souza was born into an upper caste Christian family, living in what he calls "Christian ghettos" surrounded by low caste and Dalit people. He holds a B.S. in Chemistry from Karnataka University, a M.A. in Communications from the Asian Theological Seminary in the Philippines, and an honorary Doctor in Divinity degree from the Gospel for Asia Biblical Seminary, an affiliate of Serampore University. He married Mariam, who came from an Adivasi tribal group, despite the opposition of some of his family and friends. D'souza's daughter Beryl is the medical and anti-human trafficking director of the Dignity Freedom Network.

== Career ==
One of the factors in D'souza's decision to take up the cause of Christians and Dalits was the start of attacks on Christians in the mid-1990s, including the burning to death of the missionary Graham Staines and his two young sons in Orissa in 1999. D'souza joined the Indian branch of evangelist George Verwer's Operation Mobilisation as an international vice president, and was 2012 promoted to CEO of the India branch, which has left the movement of OM in 2014. He has set up 107 English Medium Education Centers educating nearly 25,000 Dalit children working with Operation Mercy India Foundation.

In 1998, he founded the All India Christian Council (AICC). The AICC is one of the largest interdenominational Christian alliances, formed to deal with human rights issues and national concerns common to Christians in India.

In 2002, D'souza co-founded the Dignity Freedom Network (DFN), formerly known as the Dalit Freedom Network, first in the United States and, later, expanded to other countries. D'souza travels widely in campaigning for the fundamental rights of the poor, the marginalized and outcastes of society in South Asia and other nations of the world. D'souza has discussed human rights issues with civil society leaders and politicians in India, Switzerland, Germany, the United Kingdom, Canada, Brazil and the United States, and at human rights commission meetings.

== Dalit advocacy ==
Speaking in October 2005 before a US Congressional hearing, D'souza said that "India's tragedy is that society continues the practice of the caste system, with the rule of law not being applied when Dalits are being discriminated against, even though the practice of untouchability stands abolished by the Constitution." He also noted that "Christian Dalits continue to suffer for their allegiance to the Christian faith. They are discriminated against both within the Church and outside of the Church. Their rights are trampled upon. Their very existence is one of misery and suffering".

Talking of a mass conversion ceremony in October 2006, D'souza was reported by the BBC as saying "I think it's important to understand that this is a cry for human dignity, it's a cry for human worth". On 4 November 2001 thousands of Dalits left Hinduism en masse, and chose to become Buddhist.

D'souza has given many examples of cases where Dalits have been attacked when they resisted oppression. He has written that "Efforts by Dalits such as Surekha Bhotmange to demand their rights have provoked a brutal backlash from higher caste groups. In fact, incidents such as these, where witnesses, or those that seek judicial remedy, are brutally savaged, have become depressingly common".

== Christian advocacy ==
As chair of the All India Christian Council, D'souza has asked Christian leaders to stop publishing incendiary rhetoric, which was being used as fuel for anti-Christian propaganda.

He asked them to refrain from "bombastic slogans, militant language and a general demeaning of Indian culture".

Writing in 2002, D'souza said "If the Christian Church in India does not abolish caste within the Church and closes its doors to the Dalits because of the pressure of the Brahminical dominated RSS and its fundamentalist affiliates, the Dalits will turn to whoever offers them human dignity, equality and the right to spiritual salvation... The time has come for the Indian Church to clean its own house and to openly offer and give the Dalits their God given dignity as the children of God in Jesus Christ. The time has come for the Dalits to appropriate the full spiritual rights available in Jesus Christ. The time has come to turn away from the Brahminical Social Order and to create a new humanity. The Gospel of Jesus has the solution to the caste problem because the Gospel rejects all forms of discrimination and deals with issues of the heart, soul, body and human relationships". D'souza has disputed that Christians are involved in forced, fraudulent and manipulated conversions. He has stated that conversion by force is against the teachings of Jesus.

In January 2002, the AICC issued a statement signed by Joseph D'souza as President and John Dayal as Secretary General, asking the national and state governments to prevent efforts by the Sangh Parivar to stir up communal violence in the Adivasi tribal belt in Northern India. It talked of "vicious Hindutva communal rhetoric .. targeting Christians in the region". It said RSS cadres were running schools that "follow a curricula and textual material, which is outside the pale of any academic and public scrutiny, blatantly rewrites history, and poisons young minds".

== Criticism ==
The Hindu American Foundation criticized D'souza's 2005 congressional testimony stating the hearing was "deliberately biased and misrepresentative of India and Hinduism" with witnesses including D'souza who held "virulent Hinduphobic perspectives that lack any credibility in India or abroad." Specifically, the organisation criticized D'souza for terming the conversion of Hindus to Christianity as "the process of breaking this spiritual darkness."

== Bibliography ==
- Joseph D'souza (2004). Dalit Freedom Now and Forever: The Epic Struggle for Dalit Emancipation. Dalit Freedom Network. pp. 259. ISBN 0976429004.
- Joseph D'souza; Benedict Rogers; Timothy J. Beals (2007). On the Side of the Angels: Justice, Human Rights, And Kingdom Mission. Biblica. p. 201. ISBN 978-1932805703.
