= Meghalaya Board of School Education =

Education authority of Indian state

- Formation: 1973
- Type: State Governmental Board of Education
- Headquarters: Tura, India
- Official language: English

The Meghalaya Board of School of Education (MBOSE) was set up under The Meghalaya Board of School Education Act, 1973, to regulate, control and supervise matters related to School Education in the state of Meghalaya, India. It was initially set up to control the SSLC Exam until, the Pre-University degree was discontinued by the North Eastern Hill University(NEHU) in 1996. Since then, MBOSE has been responsible for conducting the Secondary School Leaving Certificate(SSLC) as well as the Higher Secondary School Leaving Certificate(HSSLC) Exam in the state. Initially, it started functioning in the Office of the Director of Public Instruction, Shillong which was later shifted to Araimile, Tura in 1974. MBOSE also has a regional office located at the state capital of Shillong. At present, there are about 1400 affiliated schools spread across the state of Meghalaya.

== See also ==
- Secondary School Leaving Certificate (SSLC)
