= Bonily Khongmen =

Indian politician

Kabonmili Timungpi also known as Bonily Khongmen

Member of Parliament, Lok Sabha
- In office 1952-1957
- Succeeded by: George Gilbert Swell
- Constituency: Autonomous District, Assam

Personal details
- Born: 25 June 1912 Umswai, Amri, West Karbi Anglong, Assam, British India (present-day Assam, India)
- Died: 17 March 2007 (aged 94)
- Party: Indian National Congress

Kabonmili Timungpi later known as Bonily Khongmen (25 June 1912 – 17 March 2007) was an Indian politician belonging to the Indian National Congress. She was Assam's first female Member of Parliament, Lok Sabha, the first Karbi person and also among the first women Indian politician in the Indian National Congress in the then North-East India. She was elected to the Lok Sabha, lower house of the Parliament of India from the Autonomous District constituency, Assam in 1952. She was a member of the 1st Lok Sabha. She was also the Deputy Speaker in Assam assembly.

== Early life and career ==
Kabonmili Timungpi (Khongmen) was the first among karbi who have passed Matric in 1926 then, 1928-29 in Intermediate Arts(IA), first BA, MA among karbis, she completed her BA in 1932, and 1935 - 36 completed her MA in Shillong Meghalaya. Shen studied at Welsh Mission Girls' High School, Shillong, and Diocesan College, Calcutta. Between 1932 and 1946, she worked in education, as headmistress of Golaghat Girls' School (1932–33), Assamese Girls School, Shillong (1935-1940), and Lady Reid School, Shillong (1940-1946).

=== Political career ===
In 1946, Mrs. Kabonmili Timungpi (Khongmen) participated in the provincial elections to the Assam legislative assembly, contesting and winning the Shillong reserved seat, which was then part of Assam. She was subsequently elected as the Deputy Speaker of the Assembly, the first woman to serve in that position. Khongmen contested the first Lok Sabha election in 1951 from the Autonomous District constituency of Assam. She won the election with 54% of the vote, defeating Wilson Reade of the KJD who was runner-up with 30% of the votes. She also represented as delegate of the Indian republic in the UNO, in 1955, at 10th Gereral Council of United Nation. After her loss in the 1957 general election, the Assam Government appointed her as a member of the Assam Public Service Commission (APSC) and was elevated to the post of Chairperson in 1963. She was the first woman to become the Chairperson of APSC. After retiring as APSC Chairperson, she was also appointed as a Member of the Union Public Service Commission (UPSC) in 1963. She was the first person from the North East to become a member of UPSC. After her retirement from UPSC in 1970, She was also appointed as the First chairman of Kohima public Service Commission, in 1970-1973 and also the Chairman of Nagaland Sallary Commission in 1973-1975.

=== Other career ===
After serving as an MP in the first Lok Sabha, Kabonmili Timungpi (Khongmen) served as the first female Chairperson of the Assam Public Service Commission.

== Personal life ==
She played the violin, and took an interest in spinning and weaving clothes, collecting books, gardening, reading, and knitting.
