= North East Social Democratic Party =

- Headquarters: Mawlai Mawdatbaki, Dong Nongpathaw, Shillong

The North East Social Democratic Party (NESDP) is a political party in Meghalaya, India, founded ahead of the 2013 legislative assembly election. NESDP launched a single candidate in the election, Lamboklang Mylliem in the Jirang constituency. Mylliem won the seat, having obtained 10,336 votes (42.06% of the votes in the constituency).
