= Vincent Pala =

Indian politician

Vincent H Pala
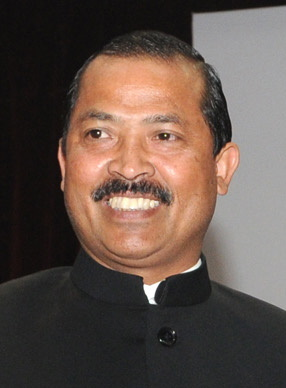
- Pala in 2012

President Meghalaya Pradesh Congress Committee
- Incumbent
- Assumed office 25 August 2021
- Preceded by: Celestine Lyngdoh

Member of Parliament, Lok Sabha
- In office 16 May 2009 – 4 June 2024
- Preceded by: Paty Ripple Kyndiah
- Succeeded by: Ricky AJ Syngkon
- Constituency: Shillong

Minister of State, Minister of Water Resources (India)
- In office 28 May 2009 – 27 October 2012
- Prime Minister: Manmohan Singh

Personal details
- Born: 14 February 1968 (age 58) Lamyrsiang, Meghalaya, India
- Party: Indian National Congress
- Spouse: Dimorine Tariang
- Education: Jalpaiguri Government Engineering College

Vincent H Pala (born 14 February 1968) is an Indian politician from Meghalaya and a member of the Indian National Congress. He represented the Shillong Lok Sabha constituency in the [[15th Lok Sabha|15th]], 16th and 17th Lok Sabhas from 2009 to 2024. He served as a Minister of State in the [[Ministry of Water Resources (India)|Ministry of Water Resources]] and the [[Ministry of Minority Affairs]] in the Second Manmohan Singh ministry. He has been president of the Meghalaya Pradesh Congress Committee since August 2021

== Early life and personal life ==
Vincent H Pala was born to John Dkhar and Hermelinda Pala on 14 February 1968, in Lamyrsiang village in East Jaintia Hills district of Meghalaya. He graduated in civil engineering from Jalpaiguri Government Engineering College and later he worked as assistant chief engineer in the Public Works Department of the Government of Meghalaya.

He married Dimorine Tariang and has four daughters: Dr. Wanmancy, Daphihi, Fiola, and Azaria. He resides at Edamanry Cottage, Dhankheti, Shillong.

== Political career ==
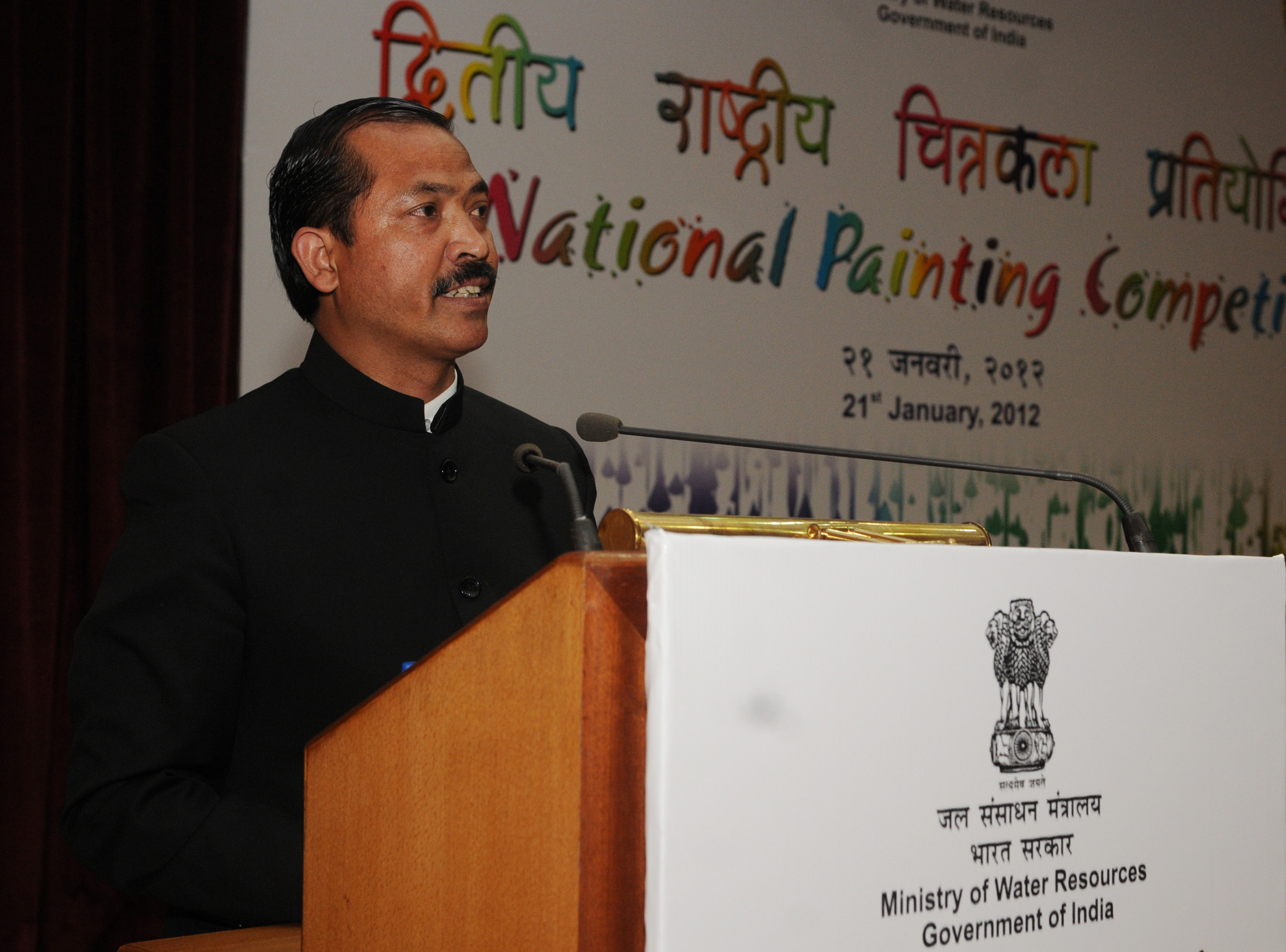
Vincent Pala addressing at the 2nd National Painting Competition, organised by the Central Ground Board under the Ministry of Water Resources, in New Delhi on January 21, 2012

Pala was a member of Shillong in the 2009 election. He held this seat in the 2014 elections and became a member of the 16th Lok Sabha. Pala had been elected to the 15th Lok Sabha in 2009 representing Shillong. This was the first time he stood as a candidate for the Lok Sabha election. Initially he worked as Union Minister of States, Water Resources and later was selected as the Union Minister of State, Minority Affairs. He was re-elected in the 2014 election and was a member of the 16th Lok Sabha representing Shillong. He was again re-elected in the 2019 election from Shillong in the 17th Lok Sabha. He lost the 2024 election from Shillong by a huge margin of 271,910 votes.

== Positions held ==
Pala has also served in the following positions:

1. President, Meghalaya Pradesh Congress Committee
2. Chief Coordinator, Meghalaya Pradesh Congress Committee
3. Asst. Chief Engineer, Public Works Department, 2000–2008, Government of Meghalaya
4. Treasurer, Meghalaya Pradesh Congress Committee
