= Outline of Meghalaya =

Overview of and topical guide to Meghalaya

Location of Meghalaya

The following outline is provided as an overview of and topical guide to Meghalaya:

Meghalaya – state in north-east India. The name means "the abode of clouds" in Sanskrit. The state is the wettest region of India, recording an average of 12,000 mm (470 in) of rains a year.[6] About 70% of the state is forested.[8] The Meghalaya subtropical forests ecoregion encompasses the state; its mountain forests are distinct from the lowland tropical forests to the north and south. The forests are notable for their biodiversity of mammals, birds, and plants.

Seal of Meghalaya

== General reference ==
=== Names ===
- Common English name: Meghalaya
  - Pronunciation:
    - /meɪɡˈɑːləjə/
    - US: /ˌmeɪɡəˈleɪə/;
- Official English name(s): Meghalaya
- Nickname(s):
- Adjectival(s): Meghalayan
- Demonym(s): Meghalayans

=== Rankings (amongst India's states) ===
- by population: 23rd
- by area (2011 census): 23rd
- by crime rate (2015): 22nd
- by gross domestic product (GDP) (2014): 24th
- by Human Development Index (HDI):
- by life expectancy at birth:
- by literacy rate:

== Geography of Meghalaya ==
Geography of Meghalaya

- Meghalaya is: an Indian state, and one of the Seven Sister States
- Population of Meghalaya: 3,211,000 (2014)
- Area of Meghalaya: 22,429 km^{2} (8,660 sq mi)
- Atlas of Meghalaya

=== Location of Meghalaya ===
- Meghalaya is situated within the following regions:
  - Northern Hemisphere
  - Eastern Hemisphere
    - Eurasia
      - Asia
        - South Asia
          - India
            - Northeast India
              - Seven Sister States
- Time zone: Indian Standard Time (UTC+05:30)

=== Regions of Meghalaya ===
==== Administrative divisions of Meghalaya ====
===== Districts of Meghalaya =====
- Districts of Meghalaya

===== Municipalities of Meghalaya =====
- Cities of Meghalaya
  - Capital of Meghalaya: Capital of Meghalaya

=== Demography of Meghalaya ===
Demographics of Meghalaya

== Government and politics of Meghalaya ==
Politics of Meghalaya

- Form of government: Indian state government (parliamentary system of representative democracy)
- Capital of Meghalaya: Capital of Meghalaya
- Elections in Meghalaya

=== Union government in Meghalaya ===
- Rajya Sabha members from Meghalaya
- Meghalaya Pradesh Congress Committee
- Indian general election, 2009 (Meghalaya)
- Indian general election, 2014 (Meghalaya)

=== Branches of the government of Meghalaya ===
Government of Meghalaya

==== Executive branch of the government of Meghalaya ====
- Head of state: Governor of Meghalaya,
- Head of government: Chief Minister of Meghalaya,

==== Legislative branch of the government of Meghalaya ====
Meghalaya Legislative Assembly

==== Judicial branch of the government of Meghalaya ====
- High Court of Meghalaya
  - Chief Justice of Meghalaya

=== Law and order in Meghalaya ===
- Law enforcement in Meghalaya
  - Meghalaya Police

== History of Meghalaya ==
History of Meghalaya

== Culture of Meghalaya ==
Culture of Meghalaya

- Architecture of Meghalaya
- Cuisine of Meghalaya
- Monuments in Meghalaya
  - Monuments of National Importance in Meghalaya
  - State Protected Monuments in Meghalaya
- World Heritage Sites in Meghalaya

=== Art in Meghalaya ===
- Music of Meghalaya

=== Religion in Meghalaya ===
Religion in Meghalaya

- Christianity in Meghalaya

=== Sports in Meghalaya ===
Sports in Meghalaya

- Cricket in Meghalaya
  - Meghalaya Cricket Association
- Football in Meghalaya
  - Meghalaya football team

=== Symbols of Meghalaya ===
Symbols of Meghalaya

- State animal:
- State bird:
- State flower:
- State seal: Seal of Meghalaya
- State tree:

== Economy and infrastructure of Meghalaya ==
- Tourism in Meghalaya

== Education in Meghalaya ==
Education in Meghalaya

- Institutions of higher education in Meghalaya

== Health in Meghalaya ==
Health in Meghalaya

== See also ==
- Outline of India
