= List of airports in Meghalaya =

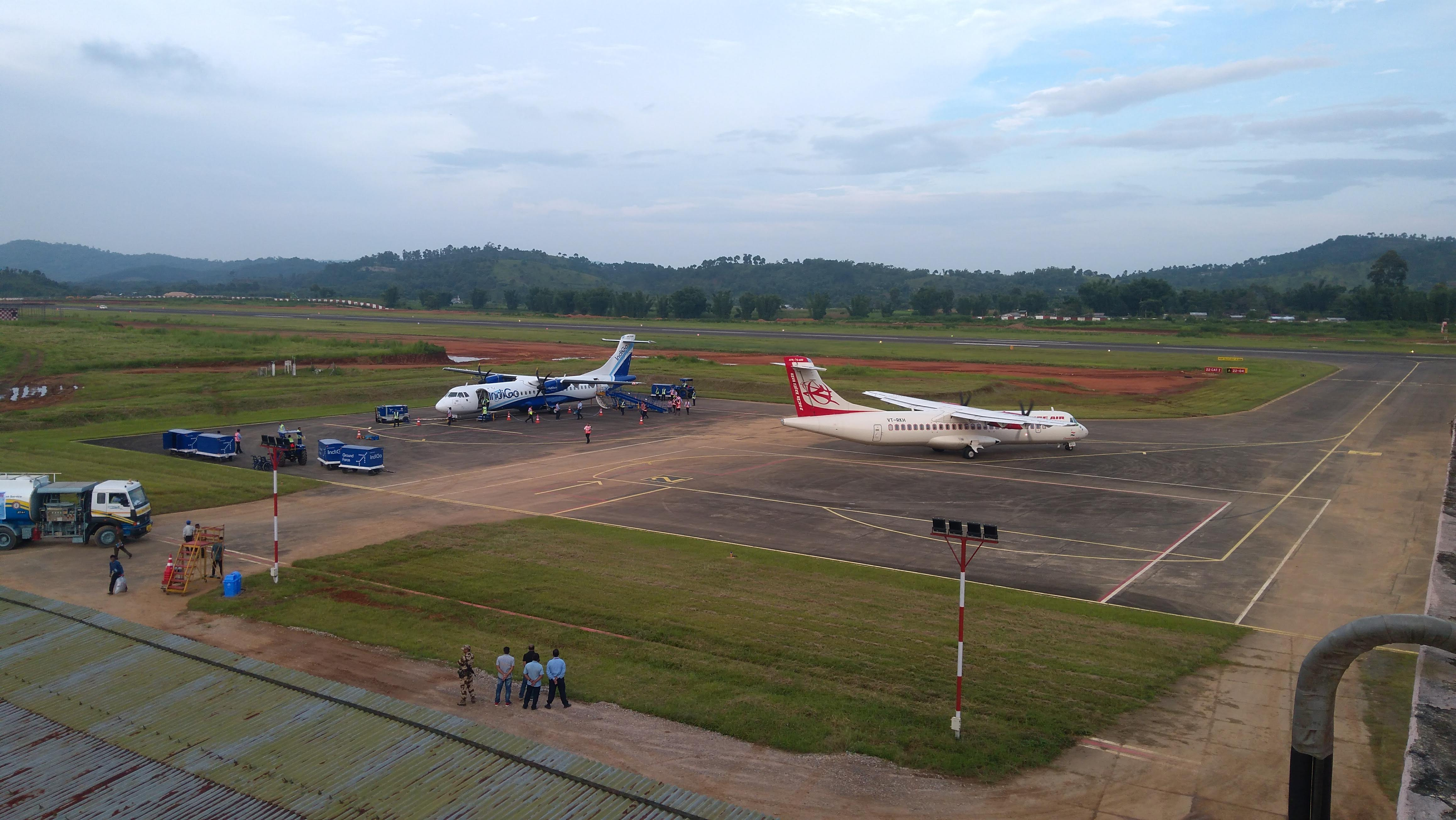
Airside of Shillong Airport

The Indian state of Meghalaya currently has only one operational airport in Shillong. The airport is operated by the Airports Authority of India. There were proposals to expand the runway of the present airport at Shillong to enable it to handle bigger aircraft. But, the Airports Authority of India termed the runway expansion unfeasible. Therefore, the Meghalaya High Court directed the Government of Meghalaya to prepare a preliminary report on whether a new greenfield airport will be constructed or the existing runway at Shillong Airport will be expanded.

A second airport at Tura named Baljek Airport is proposed to commence operations soon.

== List ==
The list includes the airports in Meghalaya with their respective ICAO and IATA codes.

List of airports in Meghalaya
Sl. no.	Location in Meghalaya	Airport name	ICAO	IATA	Operator	Category	Role
1	Shella	Shella Airport	—	—	Airports Authority of India	Domestic	Non-operational
2	Shillong	Shillong Airport	VEBI	SHL	Airports Authority of India	Domestic	Commercial
3	Tura	Baljek Airport	VETU	—	Airports Authority of India	Domestic	Non-operational
