= Emblem of Meghalaya =

Meghalaya state seal

- Armiger: The Government of Meghalaya
- Adopted: 2022
- Shield: Three hills, clouds, three monoliths, wangala drum
- Supporters: Rikgitok and Paila beads
- Motto: Government of Meghalaya
- Earlier version

The Emblem of Meghalaya is the symbol used to represent the government of the state of Meghalaya, India.

== History ==
The current emblem was adopted on 19 January 2022 as part of the state's golden jubilee celebrations. The design by P. Mario K. Pathaw was chosen following a state-wide competition that attracted 198 entries. Previously the state used a seal based on the emblem of India for official purposes.

== Design ==
The emblem is a circular seal depicting the following features:

- Three mountain peaks forming the shape of the letter M which represents the Khasi, Jaintia and Garo hills that make up the state
- Clouds which allude to the name of the state which means "abode of clouds"
- Three monoliths to represent the three main tribes in the state, the Khasi people, Jaintia people and the Garo people
- A traditional wangala festival drum
- Traditional Rikgitok and Paila beaded necklaces
- The words “Government of Meghalaya” in the English language

== Emblems of Autonomous District Councils in Meghalaya ==
There are three autonomous district councils in Meghalaya which have each adopted distinct emblems to represent themselves.

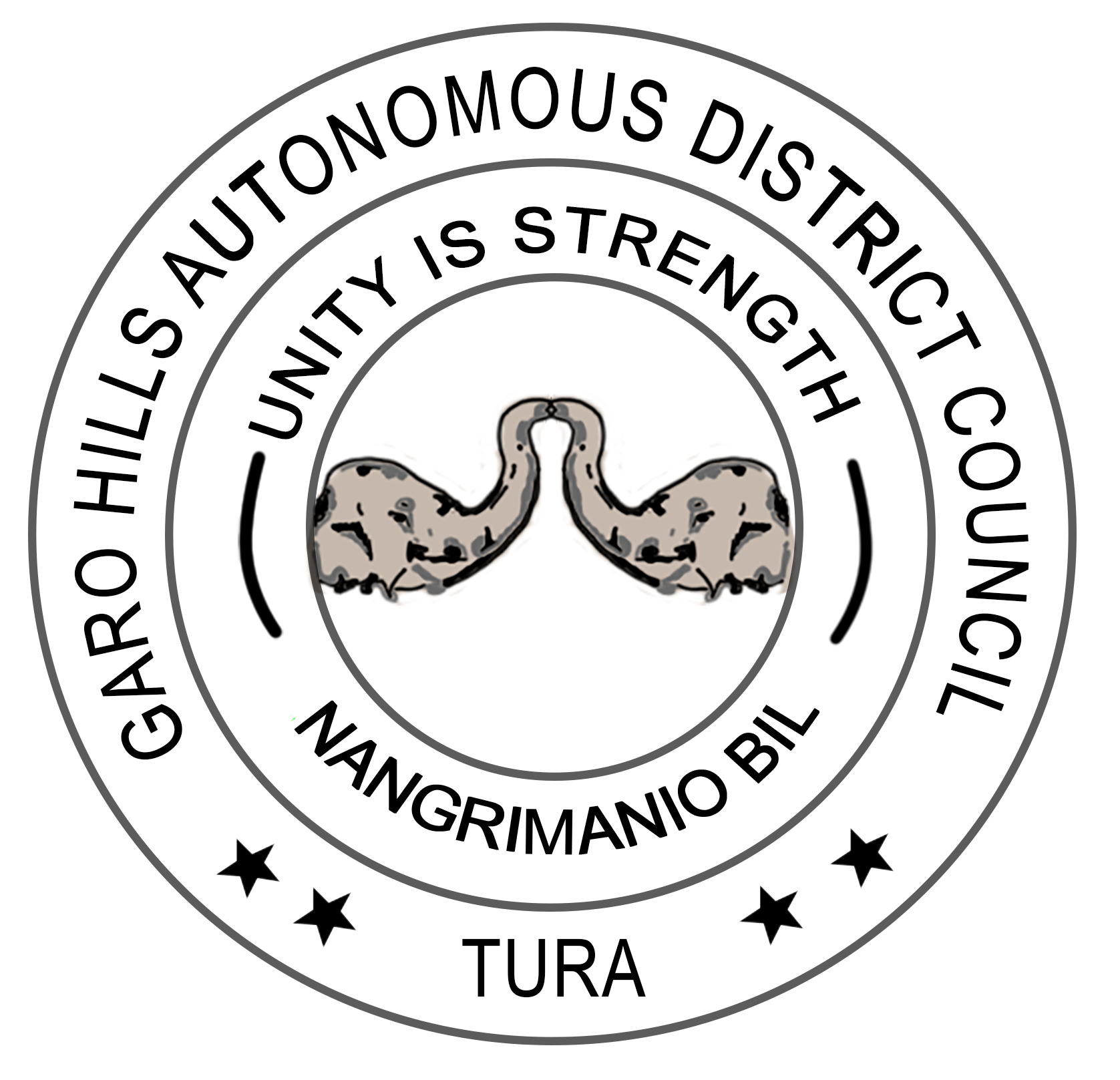
Garo Hills Autonomous District Council

Khasi Hills Autonomous District Council

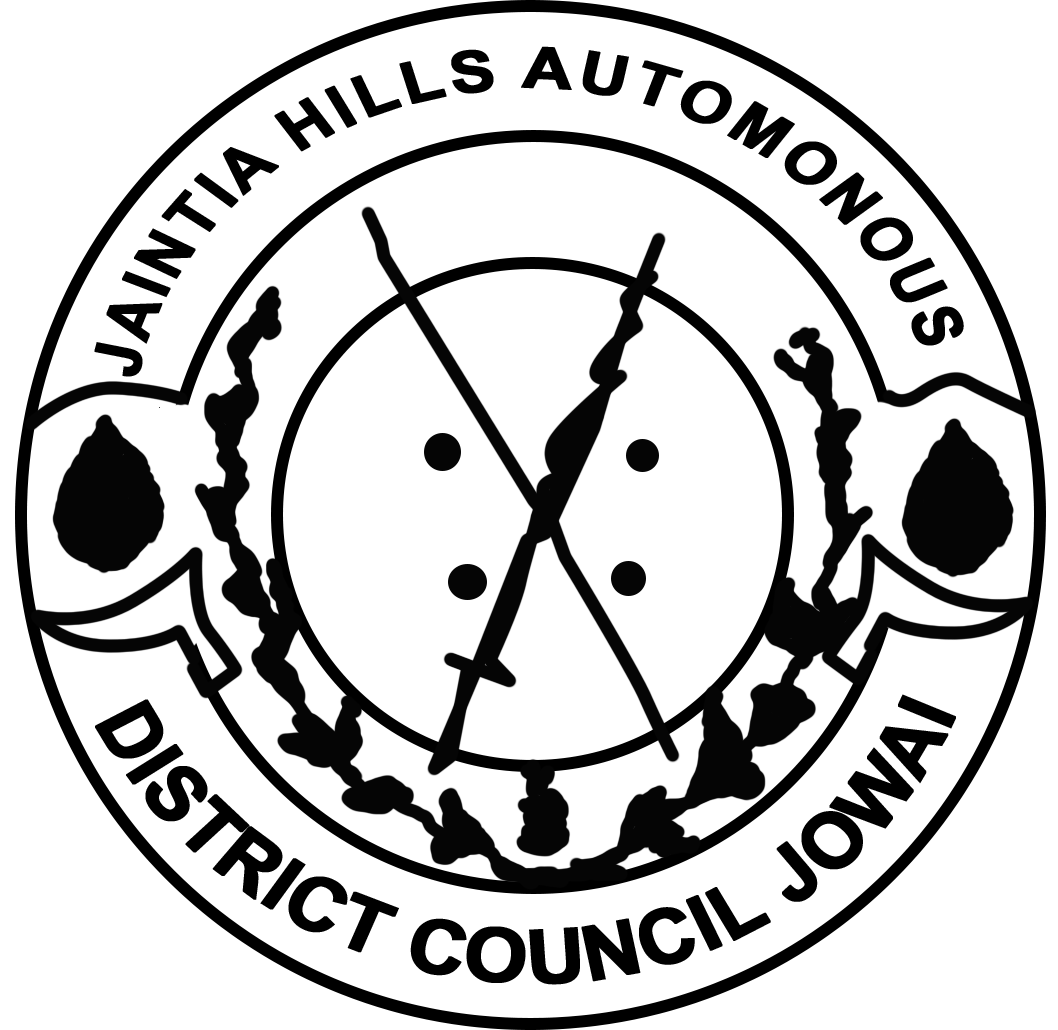
Jaintia Hills Autonomous District Council

== Government banner ==
The government of Meghalaya can be represented by a banner displaying the emblem of the state on a white field.

Banner of Meghalaya (Before 2022)

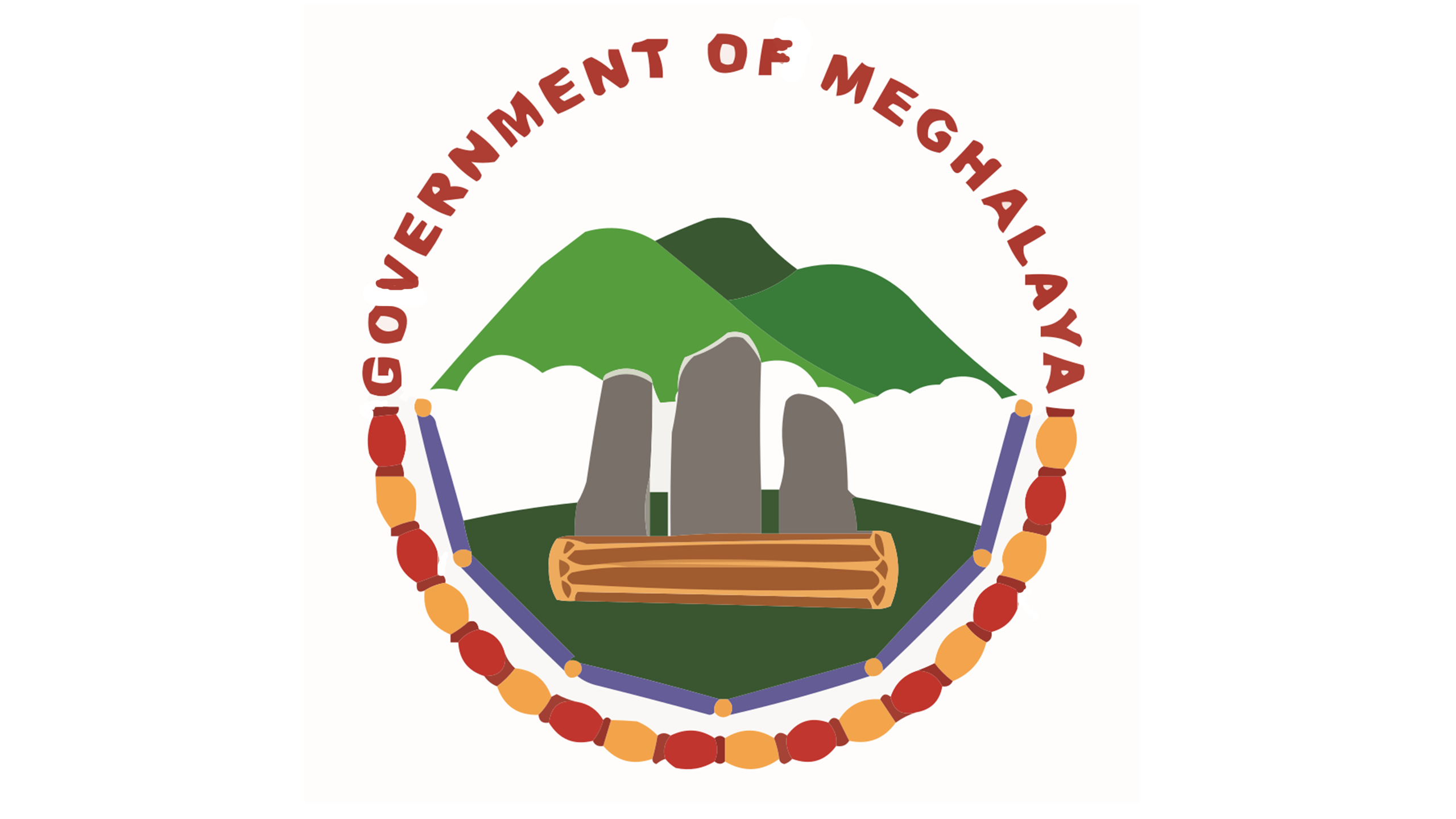
Banner of Meghalaya (2022-Present)

== See also ==
- National Emblem of India
- List of Indian state emblems
