= Ramke W. Momin =

Indian Christian religious leader (1830s-1891)

Ramke W. Momin (1830s—January 25, 1891) was a Garo Christian religious leader, missionary and evangelist.

== Biography ==
Ramke was born into the Garo tribe of northeastern India in the 1830s. Growing up in an animist culture, Ramke was an unusually devotional child, often catching little animals or birds and sacrificing them to the spirits. In 1847, the British, who were extending their rule in India, invited boys from the Garo tribe to receive an education in Goalpara. Ramke's uncle, Omed, began attending the school, but Ramke was delayed in joining him by six months, since he had recently broken his arm. While there, he learned about Hinduism and its teachings about reincarnation. He struggled with the idea that people could reincarnate as animals, or vice versa, which went against the beliefs he was raised with. He prayed for three days for clarity and received a visitation from Heaven, declaring that his prayer was heard. He received ridicule from almost everyone when he tried to tell others about the vision, except for the Hindu sadhus, who encouraged him to learn more about Hindu theology. They introduced him to the figure Vishnu, whose incarnation, Ram, Ramke began to worship.

He later came across a Christian tract that convinced him that Hindusim was a false religion. His uncle Omed had also read the tract and invited Ramke to his home in Gauhati to study Christianity.. Ramke worked as a policeman during this period. He and Omed were baptised in 1863, contrary to the wishes of their wives. Ramke and Omed begged for a missionary to be sent to their people, eventually offering to do the work themselves. They were accepted and received a salary for their work. Though Ramke preached, he primarily focused on starting a Christian school in Damra, which opened in 1864. Both men established villages for Christian converts: Omed started the town of Rajasimla at the foot of the Rajasimla Pass, while Ramke founded the village of Nisangram near Assam. Ramke was ordained as pastor in 1872 and served as headmaster of the Normal School, both at Goalpara and at Tura. He also assisted in the translation of the Scriptures into Garo and a Bengali-Garo dictionary.

Missionary William Carey wrote that Ramke converted more than 2,200 people over the course of his career.

== Personal life ==
While stationed as a policeman in Damra, Ramke met a Garo woman named Suban, who he later married. Her parents tried to convince her to leave him after news spread of his conversion to Christianity, but she refused. Their first child died in infancy, while, in the 1880s, two more of their children died within six months of each other.

Ramke died on January 25, 1891.
