= Agalmaka =

Garo festival in Meghalaya, India

Agalmaka (transl. The ceremony on the ash-covered ground.) is a spring festival of the Garo people in India. They celebrate it in March in a new field called "A'dal" to improve soil and ensure good crops with offerings. After burning debris for farming, they do a ritual to purify the new field.

The festival is led by the village priest, Nokma. He asks the Sun god "Misi Saljong" and the god of the rice paddy "Mima Kiri Rokkime" to bless the village. Agalmaka means a ritual on ashes-covered ground.

== Celebration style ==
At the beginning of the event a long bamboo is buried on the ground. Boiled rice, rice, meat, dried fish, etc. are kept in the base of the bamboo. It is accompanied by a pot of su (wine). To please the gods and goddesses, young men and women spend the night dancing and singing.

The next day, all the people spend the whole day and night celebrating joy. On the second day, the festivities end at night. The end of this festival is called Dama Gogatta. The seeds of the crop start sowing from the day after the end of the Agalmaka festival. The dance that is performed during this Agalmaka festival is accompanied by the song Asiroka. Asiroka is a song associated with the agricultural festival of Agalmaka.

== See also ==
- Wangala
