= Christianity in Meghalaya =

Religion in Meghalaya (2011)
Religion	Percent
Christians	74.6%
Hindus	11.5%
Niam Khasi, Songsarek	8.7%
Muslims	4.4%
Buddhists	0.3%
Others*	0.5%
Distribution of religions: Includes Jains, Sikhs, Animists.

Evangelization of Meghalaya began in the 19th century during the British era. In the 1830s, American Baptist Foreign Missionary Society had become active in Northeast to evangelize indigenous tribes to Christianity. Later, they were offered to expand and reach into Sohra Meghalaya, but they lacked the resources to do so and declined. Welsh Presbyterian Mission took the offer and they began work at Sohra mission field. By the early 1900s, other Protestant denominations of Christianity were active in Meghalaya. The outbreak of World Wars forced the preachers to return home to Europe and America. It is during this period that Catholicism took root in Meghalaya and neighbouring region. Currently, Catholics, Presbyterians and Baptists are three most common Christian denominations found in Meghalaya.

Before Christianity arrived in Meghalaya a majority of tribal peoples were following Animist religion with Ka Niam Khasi and Songsarek traditions. Meghalaya is a Christian tribal state. The Christian population in Meghalaya is estimated at 2.21 million which forms (74.59%) of the state population (2011 census). Meghalaya is one of three states in India to have a Christian majority. About 75% of the population practices Christianity, with Catholics, Presbyterians, and Baptists the more common denominations. The religion of the people in Meghalaya is closely related to their ethnicity. Close to 90% of the Garo tribe and nearly 80% of the Khasi are Christian, while more than 97% of the Hajong, 98.53% of the Koch, and 94.60% of the Rabha tribes are Hindu.

The Catholic Church with a homogeneous presence spread throughout the state of Meghalaya form the largest denomination in the state with 945,145 adherents (2020 data). The Church is under the ecclesiastical province of Shillong with the following dioceses: 1) Metropolitan Archdiocese of Shillong (342,169 adherents), 2) Suffragan Diocese of Tura (326,716 adherents), 3) Suffragan Diocese of Nongstoin (164,334 adherents), and 4) Suffragan Diocese of Jowai (111,930 adherents).

The Presbyterian Church is another largest denomination in Meghalaya under the Khasi Jaintia Presbyterian Assembly with 750,989 believers in 2015. In 2018 the Church has the following number of believers under the following synod's namely Khasi Jaintia Synod Mihngi (294,320 believers), the Khasi Jaintia Synod Sepngi (370,764 believers) and the Ri Bhoi Synod (70,510 believers) adding up to 735,594 believers with slight decline from 2015. Unlike the Catholic Church, there is little or no presence of Presbyterianism among the Garos with the absence of a Garo synod.

The Baptist Church under the Garo Baptist Convention make up perhaps the largest denomination among the Garos in Meghalaya with 500,560 adherents (both baptised and unbaptised) concentrated mostly in the Garo Hills out of a garo population of 821,026 with the remaining mostly Catholics.

The Church of God in Meghalaya, an indigenous church, established in Mylliem in 1902 is the fourth largest denomination in the state with nearly 100,000 adherents.

The Church of North India of the Anglican Communion under the Diocese of North East India in Meghalaya is the fifth largest denomination with close to 50,000 adherents. And some Christian Revival Church also growing.

== Statistics ==
Christians in Meghalaya
Year	Number	Percentage
2001	1,628,986	70.25
2011	2,213,027	74.59

Historical Christian Population in Meghalaya
Year	Pop.	±%
1901	20,967	—
1911	36,699	+75.0%
1921	48,728	+32.8%
1931	75,530	+55.0%
1941	1,056	−98.6%
1951	149,390	+14046.8%
1961	270,910	+81.3%
1971	475,267	+75.4%
1981	702,854	+47.9%
1991	1,146,092	+63.1%
2001	1,628,986	+42.1%
2011	2,213,027	+35.9%
Source: census of India

Christian percentage was 6.16% in 1901 (before India's independence), and after independence during the first census of 1951, it was found that 24.66% of the Meghalaya population follows Christianity. During 1991, Christian percentage was 64.58% and in recent 2011 census, it was found that 74.59% adheres to Christian faith.

=== Trends ===
Percentage of Christians in Meghalaya by decades

Year	Percent	Increase
1901	6.16%	-
1911	9.31%	+3.15%
1921	11.54%	+2.23%
1931	15.71%	+4.17%
1941	0.19%	-15.52%
1951	24.67%	+24.48%
1961	35.21%	+10.54%
1971	46.98%	+11.77%
1981	52.62%	+5.64%
1991	64.58%	+11.96%
2001	70.25%	+5.67%
2011	74.59%	+4.34%

=== Tribes ===
Percentage of Christians in the Scheduled Tribes

Tribe	Christians	Percent
Khasi	1,173,693	83.14%
Garo	787,029	95.86%
Mikir	15,290	79.27%
Bodo Kachari	1,166	25.04%
Hajong	520	1.35%
Rabha	1,649	5.05%
Koch	222	0.98%

Meghalaya Scheduled Tribe Population is 25,55,861 (86% of the state population mainly Garos and Khasis), out of which 21,57,887 people among them follow Christianity.

Whereas, Non ST population is 4,11,028 (mainly Bengalis, Nepalis, Biharis, Marwaris etc.), out of which 55,140 people among them follow Christianity. As per social activists, many Nepalis and Bengalis (who constitute a huge chunk of non-tribal population in the state) are being converted into Christianity by the Christian missionaries, specially in Shillong and in other rural border areas of the state.

== See also ==
- List of Christian denominations in North East India
- Christian Revival Church
