= Wangala =

Harvest festival celebrated by the Garo tribe

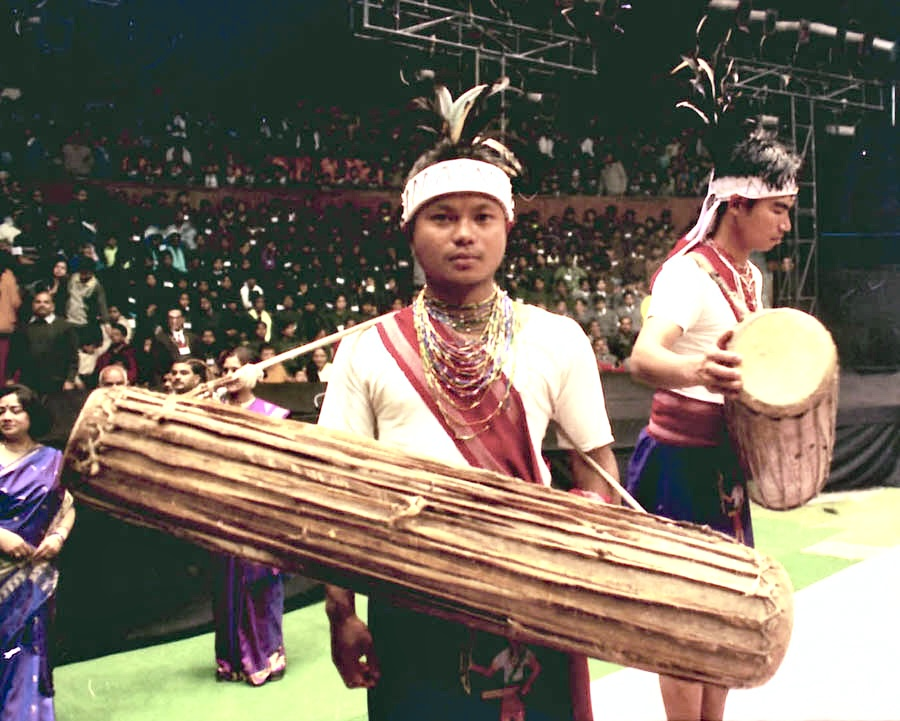
- A 'Wangala' drummer of the Garo Tribe of Meghalaya at the Republic Day Folk Dance Festival 2004, which was inaugurated by the President A. P. J. Abdul Kalam in New Delhi on 24 January 2004
- Official name: Wangala
- Also called: Festival of the Hundred Drums
- Observed by: Garo people
- Type: Seasonal, traditional
- Significance: A harvest festival
- Date: Multi-day
- Frequency: Annual
- Related to: Agalmaka

Wangala is also called the festival of "The Hundred Drums", a harvest festival celebrated by the Garo tribe, who live in Meghalaya, Nagaland, and Assam in India and Greater Mymensingh in Bangladesh. In this post harvest festival, they give thanks to 'Misi Saljong', the sun god, for blessing the people with a rich harvest. Wangala is celebrated in the months from September to December, with different villages setting different dates for the occasion.

== History of modern Wangala ==
The first Hundred Drums Wangala Festival was organized on 6 and 7 December 1976 at Asanang, near the Rongram C&RD Block Office, 18 km from Tura, India. Since then, it has been celebrated every year. The festival has grown so big as to include dance troupes from outside Garo Hills such as Bangladesh and Karbi Anglong, with a sizeable amount of prize money up for grabs awarded to the best performing dance troupe. The 100 Drums Festival is a state-sponsored event, attracting many local, national and international tourists every year.

== The celebrations ==
Wangala is traditionally celebrated for two to three days - or up to a week - by two or three collaborating villages; though recently it has been celebrated for one day in metropolitan areas as an attempt to conserve the ancient heritage of the Garo tribe and to expose the younger generation to their roots. True traditional styles of celebrating Wangala can be found in remote "Songsarek" (animistic) villages such as Sadolpara in West Garo Hills district of Meghalaya, where people who worship the old gods still persist in their way of life; all the while rejecting Christianity. A much more hyped and commercialised variant of Wangala can be observed in the 100 Drums Festival held at Asanang in West Garo Hills, Meghalaya, where performers (who may or may not be Christians and not Songsarek) are invited from all over Garo Hills, and even from far off places such as Karbi Anglong, Tripura and Bangladesh which have sizeable pockets of Garo inhabitants. This event is held for three days and is a host to various fan favourites such as sports, food, art and culture. Tura, the cultural, financial and de facto political heartland of the Garos, is mainly represented by the students of Christian Girls' Higher Secondary School, Tura (which teaches the dance to its students as an essential part of the curriculum) at every 100 Drums Festival.

Rugala (lit. The Pouring of rice beer) and Cha·chat So·a (lit. Incense burning) are the rituals performed on the first day by the priest, who is known as "Kamal". These rituals are performed inside the house of the Nokma (chieftain i.e. the husband of the woman who holds power over an a'king) of the village. Dama Gogata, the dance with drums, flutes and assorted brass instruments by men and women in colourful dresses and proud headgear - a picture which is synonymous with visuals of Wangala - is performed on the last day of the days-long celebration.

During Wangala, people young and old dress in their colourful garments (Dakmanda", Daksari, or Gando) and feathered headgear (do'me) and dance to music played on long, oval-shaped drums (Dama).

Katta Doka (talking in a singing style/traditional tribal rapping), Ajia, Dani Doka (describing Wangala by singing), Chambil Mesaa or the Pomelo Dance are performed during these days.

== See also ==
- Agalmaka
