= Songsarek =

Traditional religion of the Garo people in Meghalaya, India

- Type: Indigenous religion
- Region: Northeast India
- Language: Garo language

Songsarek is the indigenous traditional religion practiced by the Garo people of Meghalaya, India. Historically practiced by most of the tribe, only a minority of the tribe still follow it after many converted to Christianity.

== Etymology ==
Anthropologist Erik de Maaker suggests that the word 'Songsarek' is connected to the Bengali language of the people residing in the plains adjacent to the Garo Hills. In Sanskrit, the word saà-sâra (from saà-sù) means ‘to be in the world’, as opposed to renouncing it. The word has now become part of the Garo language, and people use it to refer to themselves as 'the ones who are obeying the deities.'

== History ==
Songsarek was followed by majority of the Garo people historically. By the spread of Christianity in the Garo hills in the second half of the nineteenth century and throughout the twentieth century, the proportion of Songsarek population decreased.

== Beliefs and festivals ==
The Supreme God in Songsarek religion is the Tatara Rabuga, described in oral tradition as "one so high that he cannot be reached." His deputy is Misi Saljong, who is the God of Sun, crops and fertility and is worshipped in Wangala festival. Susime is the Goddess of wealth. During the Wangala festival, women wear skirts crafted from handwoven cloth made on looms. These skirts feature a traditional pattern resembling a diamond, symbolizing the eye of Susime, the Goddess of Wealth.

The Rokkime is the Mother Goddess of Rice and is worshipped in the Agalmaka festival.

The Wagtail bird holds significant importance in Songsarek beliefs. Villagers carefully observe its flight patterns to predict the rainfall for the season.

== Demographics ==
Historical population
Year	Pop.	±%
1971	143,206	—
1981	127,201	−11.2%
1991	94,846	−25.4%
2001	49,832	−47.5%
2011	19,834	−60.2%
Source: Census of India

The number of the Songsarek followers in Meghalaya has declined from more than 88,000 as per 1991 Census to about 17,000 in 2011 Census. It was followed by 16% of the Garo in 1991 and decreased to 2% in 2011.

In the Garo hills, currently only 13 to 15 villages out of the 150 villages are Songsarek majority villages.

In Bangladesh, 3.71% of the Garo people follows Songsarek.

== Festivals ==
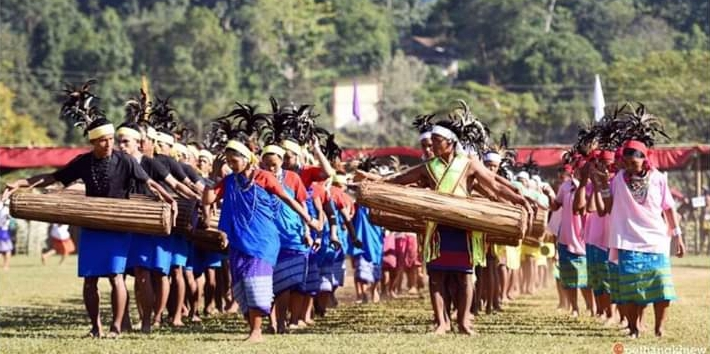
Wangala Festival

=== Wangala ===
Wangala is the harvest festival of Songsarek followers. During the festival, handprints using three fingers dipped in rice flour are created on their doors. These imprints symbolize the water level and are meant to ensure a good harvest. During the festival, the first harvest is offered to Misi Saljong, the Sun God and giver of life, in a ritual known as Rugala.

=== Agalmaka ===
Agalmaka is another festival in which both Misi Saljong and Rokkime, the mother goddess of Rice, are worshipped.

== See also ==
- Niamtre, traditional religion of Jaintia people of Meghalaya.
