= Pa Togan Sangma =

Garo tribe leader in North East India

Pa Togan Sangma also known as Togan Sangma or Pa Togan Nengminja Sangma was a Garo (A.chik Tribe) leader from Garo hills in North East India. In 1872, during the British occupation of Garo Hills (A.chik A.song) in the present Indian state of Meghalaya.

Today, there is statue built in his memorial for his bravery at Chisobibra, East Garo Hills, Meghalaya

Pa Togan Nengminja was a freedom fighter who fought against the Britishers (Gipok jat in Garo Language) with other A.chik warriors (Matgriks) attacked the British soldiers while they were sleeping. Roused from sleep by the cries of their comrades, the remaining British soldiers retaliated. It was a one-sided affair as the Garo warriors were ill-equipped. they suffered heavy losses and Pa Togan Nengminza died on the spot, succumbing to the British, who had guns unlike the Garo warriors. It may be noted that Pa Togan came up with the idea of using huge shields made of plantain stems to stop bullets as he believed metal would cool as soon as it hit the shield. Though, it did not work in the end.
