= Education in Meghalaya =

Education in a state of India

The Indian state of Meghalaya has a literacy rate of 62.56, according to the census of 2001, and is India's 27th most literate state. This, however, had rapidly increased to 74.43% by 2011.

== History ==
Regular education in Meghalaya began when the Khasi alphabet was proposed in 1842 by the Welsh missionary Thomas Jones. For the Garo Hills area, the Garo alphabet was developed in 1902 by American missionaries. No strict rules required natives of the colonies to be well educated, so only a few primary schools were functioning at the colonial time. Shillong being the capital of the then Assam Province has been the education hub serving the youth from all the north-eastern states of India .

== School education ==
Meghalaya has an excess amount of schools leading to drop in quality . The vast majority of schools in Meghalaya are up to the Lower Primary (LP) or Upper Primary (UP) level . Schools are operated both by the government and privately .

=== Government schools ===
- State Government schools includes many LP and UP schools in rural villages . The following are the list of some state government schools -

Sl. No.	Schools	Place
1.	Govt. Boys' HSS	Shillong, East Khasi Hills
2.	Govt. Girls' HSS	Shillong, East Khasi Hills
3.	Govt. Girls' HSS	Jowai, West Jaintia Hills
4.	Govt. Boys' HSS	Jowai, West Jaintia Hills
5.	Sohkha Govt. HSS	Sohkha, West Jaintia Hills
6.	Sib Singh Memorial Govt. HSS	Nongstoin, West Khasi Hills
7.	Mallangkona Govt. HSS	Mallangkona, West Khasi Hills
8.	Tirot Singh Govt. HSS	Mairang, West Khasi Hills
9.	Patharkhmah Govt. HSS	Patharkhmah, Ri Bhoi
10.	Govt. Boys' HSS	Tura, West Garo Hills
11.	Govt. Girls' HSS	Tura, West Garo Hills
12.	Dadengiri Govt. HSS	Dadengiri, West Garo Hills
13.	Dalu Govt. Girls' HSS	Dalu, South West Garo Hills
14.	Ampati Govt. Girls' HSS	Ampati, South West Garo Hills
15.	Rongrenggiri Govt. HSS	Rongrenggiri, East Garo Hills
16.	United Kharkutta Govt. HSS	United Kharkutta, East Garo Hills
17.	Resubelpara Govt. HSS	Resubelpara, North Garo Hills
18.	Baghmara Govt. HSS	Baghamara, South Garo Hills

Apart from the above , there are some "special school" run by the state govt. that are not affiliated to the state education board , i.e. , Meghalaya Board of School Education . Rather they affiliate themselves to the Council For The Indian School Certificate Examinations. These include -

Pine Mount School	Girls	ISCE + ISC	State Gov
Tura Public School	Co-ed	ISCE	State Gov
Jowai Public School	Co-ed	ISCE	State Gov
Shillong Public School	Co-ed	ISCE + ISC	State Gov
Meghalaya Police Public School	Co-ed	ISCE	State Gov ( Police Dept )

- Central Government Schools in the state includes Kendriya Vidyalaya Sangathan (KVS) , Jawahar Navodaya Vidyalaya Samiti (JNV) and Eklavya Model Residential School (EMRS) with both KVS and JNV under the Ministry of Education while EMRS under the Ministry of Tribal Affairs . These schools are affiliated to the Central Board of Secondary Education (CBSE).
- KVS in Meghalaya includes -

School Name	Office Address
KENDRIYA VIDYALAYA (NEPA) BARAPANI	KENDRIYA VIDYALAYA NEPA BARAPANI UMSAW UMIAM RI-BHOI DIST. , MEGHALAYA 793123
KENDRIYA VIDYALAYA (HAPPY VALLEY)SHILLONG	58 GTC, HAPPY VALLEY, SHILLONG, MEGHALAYA 793007
KENDRIYA VIDYALAYA (AFS) LAITKOR PEAK SHILLONG	PRINCIPAL KENDRIYA VIDYALAYA AIR FORCE STATION LAITKORPEAK SHILLONG DISTRICT EAST KHASI HILLS MEGHALAYA 793010
KENDRIYA VIDYALAYA (NEHU) SHILLONG	NEHU PERMANENT CAMPUS, MAWLAI UMSHING MAWKYNROH SHILLONG - 793022
KENDRIYA VIDYALAYA EAC UPPER SHILLONG	KENDRIYA VIDYALAYA EAC UPPER SHILLONG POST NONGLYER, EAST KHASI HILLS SHILLONG, MEGHALAYA 793009
KENDRIYA VIDYALAYA UMROI CANTT	KV UMROI CANTT.,POST BARAPANI,DIST.-RIBHOI,STATE-MEGHALAYA
KENDRIYA VIDYALAYA TURA	NEW TURA, P.O.ARAIMILE, DIST:WEST GARO HILLS, STATE:MEGHALAYA, PIN794101

- JNV in Meghalaya includes -
  - East Khasi Hills: JNV Mawsynram, and JNV Mawphlang
  - Ri Bhoi: JNV Niangbari (Nongpoh)
  - West Khasi Hills: JNV Nongstoin (Nongpyndeng)
  - East Jaintia Hills: JNV Lad Rymbai
  - West Jaintia Hills: JNV Mukhla (Thadlaskein)
  - East Garo Hills: PM-SHRI JNV Williamnagar (Amanagar)
  - South Garo Hills: JNV Baghmara
  - South West Garo Hills: JNV Kendrikona (Mahendraganj)
- EMRS in Meghalaya includes -

Village	District
Umlahdkhur	West Jiantia Hills
Samanda	East Garo Hills
Pahamsyiem	Ri Bhoi
Mawlyntriang	Eastern West Khasi Hills

=== Private schools ===
Private schools are run mostly by religious society such as the Catholic Church , Presbyterian Church , Seng Khasi and other individuals. Private schools can be further classified into Government Aided or Unaided. Government aided schools comprises those which received Grand In Aid (GIA) Deficit Scheme or other schemes such as Deficit Pattern , Adhoc GIA , Night/Morning Adhoc Sec. school , Science grant , Hindi Grant , 4th teacher , IE Volunteers , Pre-Primary , SSA managed by Private Organisations , etc where all the funding is from the state government only, except SSA , i.e. Sarva Shiksha Abhiyan where the funding pattern is 90:10 (90% contributed by the Centre and 10% by the State) .

=== School affiliation ===
Most schools in Meghalaya are affiliated to the state board , i.e. , the Meghalaya Board of School Education . Apart from the state board, few schools are affiliated to other boards such as the Central Board of Secondary Education (CBSE) , the Council For The Indian School Certificate Examinations (CISCE) and the Cambridge International Education .

- MBOSE Affiliated Schools
- CBSE Affiliated Schools -
- CISCE Affiliated Schools - There are currently only 8 schools in the state affiliated to CISCE which includes

Name	School Type	School Level	Ownership
St. Edmund's School	Boys	ISCE + ISC	Private
Pine Mount School	Girls	ISCE + ISC	State Gov
Tura Public School	Co-ed	ISCE	State Gov
Jowai Public School	Co-ed	ISCE	State Gov
Shillong Public School	Co-ed	ISCE + ISC	State Gov
Loreto Convent	Girls	ISCE + ISC	Private
Meghalaya Police Public School	Co-ed	ISCE	State Gov ( Police Dept )
Carmel School	Co-ed	ISCE + ISC	Private

- Cambridge International Education - Only one school is affiliated to CIE , i.e. , Shillong Chamber International School (SCIS)

== Higher education ==
Meghalaya has a well diversed institution spread across the state . Higher education institutions in the state comprises mainly of affiliated colleges ( public & private ) , universities ( public & private ) , Stand Alone Institutions offering professional courses , etc .

=== Institutes of National Importance ===
- Indian Institute of Management Shillong - First IIM in North East India
- National Institute of Technology Meghalaya - Located in Sohra ( Cherrapunji )
- National Institute of Fashion Technology, Shillong, The Only NIFT in North East India
- College of Community Science , Tura - a constituent college of Central Agricultural University, Imphal, Manipur
- Institute of Hotel Management, Shillong
- College of Post Graduate Studies in Agricultural Sciences (CPGSAS), Umiam - a constituent college of Central Agricultural University, Imphal, Manipur

=== Medical colleges ===
==== Public ====
1. North Eastern Indira Gandhi Regional Institute of Health and Medical Sciences - NEIGRIHMS is operated by the Central Government and it is affiliated to NEHU
2. North Eastern Institute of Ayurveda and Homeopathy - NEIAH is operated by the Central Government and it is affiliated to NEHU
3. Shillong Medical College - SMC is operated by the State Government and it is affiliated to NEHU . It is Meghalaya's first state-run government medical college.

==== Private ====
1. PA Sangma International Medical College (PIMC) - It is a constituent college of the University of Science and Technology, Meghalaya (USTM) and the first private medical college in Meghalaya .

=== Public universities ===
==== Central ====
- The English and Foreign Languages University, Shillong Campus . The only campus in North East India
- North Eastern Hill University, Shillong - First Central University in North East India established in 1973.
  1. Deen Dayal Upadhyaya Community College (DDUCC) , Wahiajer - a constituent college of NEHU

==== State ====
- Captain Williamson Sangma State University, Tura
  1. College of Architecture and Urban Planning , Balalgre - a constituent college of CWSSU
- National Law University of Meghalaya
- Indian Institute of Public Health, Shillong

=== Deemed to be a university ===
- North East Regional Institute of Education (NERIE) , Umiam - It is a constituent regional unit of the National Council of Educational Research and Training (NCERT) , an Institution Deemed to be University.

=== Recognized private universities ===
Private universities in Meghalaya are established through a dedicated State Legislative Act passed by the Meghalaya Legislative Assembly . Recognised private universities currently operating includes -

- ICFAI University, Meghalaya
- Mahatma Gandhi University, Meghalaya
- Martin Luther Christian University
- MIT University, Meghalaya
- Northeast Adventist University
- William Carey University, Meghalaya
- University of Science and Technology Meghalaya

=== Affiliated colleges ===
- Colleges affiliated to North-Eastern Hill University , Shillong includes -

Name	District	Year Of Establishment	Manegement
Bissau College	East Khasi Hills	1993	Private Un-Aided
Buddha Bhanu Saraswati College	East Khasi Hills	1993	Private Un-Aided
Greater Mawlai College	East Khasi Hills	-	Private Un-Aided
Lady Keane College	East Khasi Hills	1935	Private Aided (Government Aided)
Morning Star College	East Khasi Hills	1993	Private Un-Aided
Nabon Synod College	East Khasi Hills	1996	Private Un-Aided
K. L. Bajoria College	East Khasi Hills	2004	Private Un-Aided
Raid Laban College	East Khasi Hills	1984	Private Aided (Government Aided)
Sankardev College	East Khasi Hills	1962	Private Aided (Government Aided)
Seng Khasi College	East Khasi Hills	1973	Private Aided (Government Aided)
Shillong Commerce College	East Khasi Hills	1986	Private Aided (Government Aided)
Shillong College	East Khasi Hills	1956	Private Aided (Government Aided)
St. Anthony's College	East Khasi Hills	1934	Private Aided (Government Aided)
St. Dominic's College	East Khasi Hills	1995	Private Un-Aided
St. Edmund's College	East Khasi Hills	1923	Private Aided (Government Aided)
St. Mary's College	East Khasi Hills	1937	Private Aided (Government Aided)
Synod College	East Khasi Hills	1965	Private Aided (Government Aided)
Umshyrpi College	East Khasi Hills	1994	Private Un-Aided
Bormanik College	East Khasi Hills	1991	Private Aided (Government Aided)
Women's College	East Khasi Hills	1984	Private Aided (Government Aided)
Mawlai Presbyterian College	East Khasi Hills	2000	Private Aided (Government Aided)
JJM NICHOLS ROY COLLEGE	East Khasi Hills	2018	Private Un-Aided
SMIT COLLEGE	East Khasi Hills	2021	Private Un-Aided
BELLEFONTE EVENING COLLEGE	East Khasi Hills	2024	Private Un-Aided
Mawsynram Border Area College	East Khasi Hills	1997	Private Aided (Government Aided)
Sohra Government College	East Khasi Hills	1982	State Government
RIWAR COLLEGE	East Khasi Hills	2009	Private Aided (Government Aided)
Tirot Sing Memorial College	EASTERN WEST KHASI HILLS	1981	Private Aided (Government Aided)
KHRAWSING CHRISTIAN COLLEGE	East Khasi Hills	2008	Private Un-Aided
Mairang Presbyterian Science College	EASTERN WEST KHASI HILLS	2006	Private Un-Aided
Sngap Syiem College	South West Khasi Hills	1985	Private Aided (Government Aided)
ST XAVIER'S COLLEGE UMOID	South West Khasi Hills	-	Private Un-Aided
Nongstoin College	West Khasi Hills	1978	Private Aided (Government Aided)
St. Francis D Assisi College, Siejlieh, Nongstoin	West Khasi Hills	2010	Private Un-Aided
Khadsawphra College	EASTERN WEST KHASI HILLS	2017	Private Un-Aided
MERIBON K H MEMORIAL COLLEGE	East Khasi Hills	2015	Private Un-Aided
Lyngngam Presbyterian College	West Khasi Hills	2016	Private Un-Aided
SYNOD COLLEGE NONGSTOIN, NONGSTOIN	West Khasi Hills	-	Private Un-Aided
Kiang Nangbah Government College	West Jaintia Hills	1967	State Government
Thomas Jones Synod College	West Jaintia Hills	1997	Private Aided (Government Aided)
AMWI COLLEGE	West Jaintia Hills	2021	Private Un-Aided
SHANGPUNG COLLEGE	West Jaintia Hills	2007	Private Aided (Government Aided)
UMMULONG PRESBYTERIAN COLLEGE	West Jaintia Hills	2013	Private Un-Aided
Jaintia Eastern College	East Jaintia Hills	1992	Private Aided (Government Aided)
Nongtalang College	West Jaintia Hills	1988	Private Aided (Government Aided)
DON BOSCO COLLEGE	East Jaintia Hills	-	Private Un-Aided
Union Christian College	Ri Bhoi	1952	University
CHRIST COLLEGE	Ri Bhoi	-	Private Un-Aided
Ri Bhoi College	Ri Bhoi	1984	Private Aided (Government Aided)
Balawan College	Ri Bhoi	2009	Private Aided (Government Aided)
RI BHOI SYNOD COLLEGE	Ri Bhoi	-	Private Un-Aided
Don Bosco College	West Garo Hills	1987	Private Aided (Government Aided)
Durama College	West Garo Hills	1993	Private Aided (Government Aided)
Tura Government College	West Garo Hills	1958	State Government
TURA CHRISTIAN COLLEGE	West Garo Hills	2018	Private Aided (Government Aided)
PASF ABONG NOGA COLLEGE	West Garo Hills	-	State Government
Acheng Rangmanpa College	South West Garo Hills	1983	Private Aided (Government Aided)
Kazi & Zaman College	West Garo Hills	1990	Private Aided (Government Aided)
Tikrikilla College	West Garo Hills	1986	Private Aided (Government Aided)
Ampati College	South West Garo Hills	2000	Private Aided (Government Aided)
Mendipathar College	North Garo Hills	1971	Private Aided (Government Aided)
Phukan Memorial College	West Garo Hills	2001	Private Aided (Government Aided)
Loyola College	East Garo Hills	2013	Private Un-Aided
Nongrum College	West Garo Hills	2007	Private Un-Aided
Williamnagar Government College	East Garo Hills	2000	State Government
Captain Williamson Memorial Government College	South Garo Hills	1992	State Government
IAIKYNTIEW COLLEGE	East Khasi Hills	1999	Private Un-Aided
ALPHA COLLEGE OF ARTS AND COMMERCE	Ri Bhoi	2021	Private Un-Aided
BANSARA INSTITUTE OF OPHTHALMIC SCIENCES	East Khasi Hills	2025	Private Un-Aided
College of Teacher Education	West Garo Hills	1993	State Government
College of Teacher Education (PGT)	East Khasi Hills	1964	Private Aided (Government Aided)
Don Bosco College of Teacher Education	West Garo Hills	2005	Private Un-Aided
Goodwill College	East Khasi Hills	2000	Private Un-Aided
KHAD AR DALOI LAW COLLEGE JOWAI	West Jaintia Hills	1986	Private Aided (Government Aided)
NEIGRIHMS, College of Nursing	East Khasi Hills	2006	Central Government
NEIGRIHMS, MBBS College	East Khasi Hills	-	Central Government
NORTH EAST REGIONAL INSTITUTE OF EDUCATION	Ri Bhoi	1994	Central Government
North -Eastern Hill University,Tura Campus	West Garo Hills	-	Central Government
Regional Institute of Science & Technology	Ri Bhoi	2009	Private Un-Aided
SELSELLA COLLEGE	West Garo Hills	2009	University
SHILLONG GOVERNMENT COLLEGE OF ENGINEERING	East Khasi Hills	2022	State Government
Shillong Law College	East Khasi Hills	1964	Private Un-Aided
SHILLONG MEDICAL COLLEGE	East Khasi Hills	2025	State Government
St. Mary's College of Teacher Education	East Khasi Hills	1937	Private Aided (Government Aided)
Tura Law College	West Garo Hills	-	Private Un-Aided

- Colleges affiliated to Captain Williamson Sangma State University, Tura includes -

RAMSANG COLLEGE, WILLIAMNAGAR	East Garo Hills	1992	Private Un-Aided
JJM NICHOLS ROY COLLEGE, PONGKUNG	East Khasi Hills	2017	Private Un-Aided
MIRIAM RUSSEL WOMEN COLLEGE	West Garo Hills	2022	Local Body
COLLEGE OF SCIENCE AND COMMERCE, MAWPHLANG	East Khasi Hills	2024	State Government
RONGJENG MODEL DEGREE COLLEGE	East Garo Hills	2024	State Government
BHAITBARI SCIENCE COLLEGE	West Garo Hills	2025	Private Un-Aided
MASON PHILLIPS ACADEMY	West Garo Hills	2025	Private Un-Aided
PATHARKHMAH MODEL DEGREE COLLEGE	Ri Bhoi	2025	State Government
RAMAKRISHNA MISSION COLLEGE SOHRA	East Khasi Hills	2025	Private Un-Aided

Currently no affiliating college in the state are "Autonomous College" . An aided college refers to those college receiving funding from the State Government in the form of Grant in Aid (GIA) Schemes which includes Deficit GIA , People’s Colleges , Adhoc GIA and Lumpsum GIA.

=== Stand alone institutions ===
Stand Alone institutions offering professional courses includes -

Name	District	Year Of Establishment	Standalone Type	Manegement
Bethany School of Nursing	East Khasi Hills	2018	Nursing	Private Un-Aided
CHERRA TEACHERS TRAINING CENTRE EAST KHASI HILLS	East Khasi Hills	1867	Teacher Training	Private Aided (Government Aided)
CIVIL HOSPITAL EAST KHASI HILLS EAST KHASI HILLS	East Khasi Hills	1968	Nursing	State Government
COMPOSITE REGIONAL CENTRE FOR SKILL DEVELOPMENT, REHABILITATION AND EMPOWERMENT OF PERSONS WITH DISABILITIES DIVYANGJAN, CRC SHILLONG	East Khasi Hills	2024	Teacher Training	Central Government
DISTRICT INSTITUTE OF EDUCATION AND TRAINING BAGHMARA	South Garo Hills	2003	Teacher Training	State Government
DISTRICT INSTITUTE OF EDUCATION & TRAINING, NONGPOH	Ri Bhoi	2003	Teacher Training	State Government
DISTRICT INSTITUTE OF EDUCATION & TRAINING RESUBELPARA, EAST GARO HILLS	North Garo Hills	2000	Teacher Training	State Government
DISTRICT INSTITUTE OF EDUCATION & TRAINING SAITSOHPEN, EAST KHASI HILLS	East Khasi Hills	2000	Teacher Training	State Government
DISTRICT INSTITUTE OF EDUCATION & TRAINING THADLASKEIN, JAINTIA HILLS	West Jaintia Hills	2000	Teacher Training	State Government
DISTRICT INSTITUTE OF EDUCATION & TRAINING WEST GARO HILLS, TURA	West Garo Hills	2004	Teacher Training	State Government
DISTRICT INSTITUTE OF EDUCATION & TRAINING WEST KHASI HILLS	West Khasi Hills	2004	Teacher Training	State Government
DR. H. GORDON ROBERTS HOSPITAL EAST KHASI HILLS	East Khasi Hills	1922	Nursing	Private Un-Aided
DR. NORMAN TUNNEL HOSPITAL, SCHOOL OF NURSING JOWAI.	West Jaintia Hills	1933	Nursing	Private Aided (Government Aided)
GNM SCHOOL OF NURSING PAHAMSYIEM, NONGPOH	Ri Bhoi	2021	Nursing	State Government
INSTITUTE OF HOTEL MANAGEMENT	East Khasi Hills	2000	Hotel Management and Catering	Central Government
JOWAI POLYTECHNIC	West Jaintia Hills	2002	Technical/Polytechnic	State Government
MONTFORT CENTRE FOR EDUCATION	West Garo Hills	-	Teacher Training	Private Un-Aided
North Eastern Institute of Ayurveda and Homoeopathy	East Khasi Hills	2012	Institutes under Ministries	Central Government
RAPSBUN SCHOOL OF NURSING EAST KHASI HILLS	East Khasi Hills	1979	Nursing	Private Un-Aided
REGIONAL LABOUR INSTITUTE SHILLONG	East Khasi Hills	2024	Institutes under Ministries	Central Government
RINO SIMONETTI MEMORIAL SCHOOL OF NURSING WEST GARO HILLS	West Garo Hills	2006	Nursing	Private Un-Aided
SCHOOL OF NURSING EAST KHASI HILLS	East Khasi Hills	1938	Nursing	State Government
SHILLONG POLYTECHNIC	East Khasi Hills	1965	Technical/Polytechnic	State Government
ST JOSEPHS ACADEMY OF NURSING UMTREW RIBHOI DISTRICT MEGHALAYA	Ri Bhoi	2020	Nursing	Private Un-Aided
TURA POLYTECHNIC	West Garo Hills	2001	Technical/Polytechnic	State Government
VATSALYA INSTITUTE OF NURSING AND PARAMEDICAL SCIENCES	East Khasi Hills	-	Nursing	Private Un-Aided
WOODLAND INSTITUTE OF NURSING EAST KHASI HILLS	East Khasi Hills	2007	Nursing	Private Un-Aided
