= Christian Girls' Higher Secondary School, Tura =

Coordinates: 25.5176°N 90.2192°E

Christian Girls' Higher Secondary School
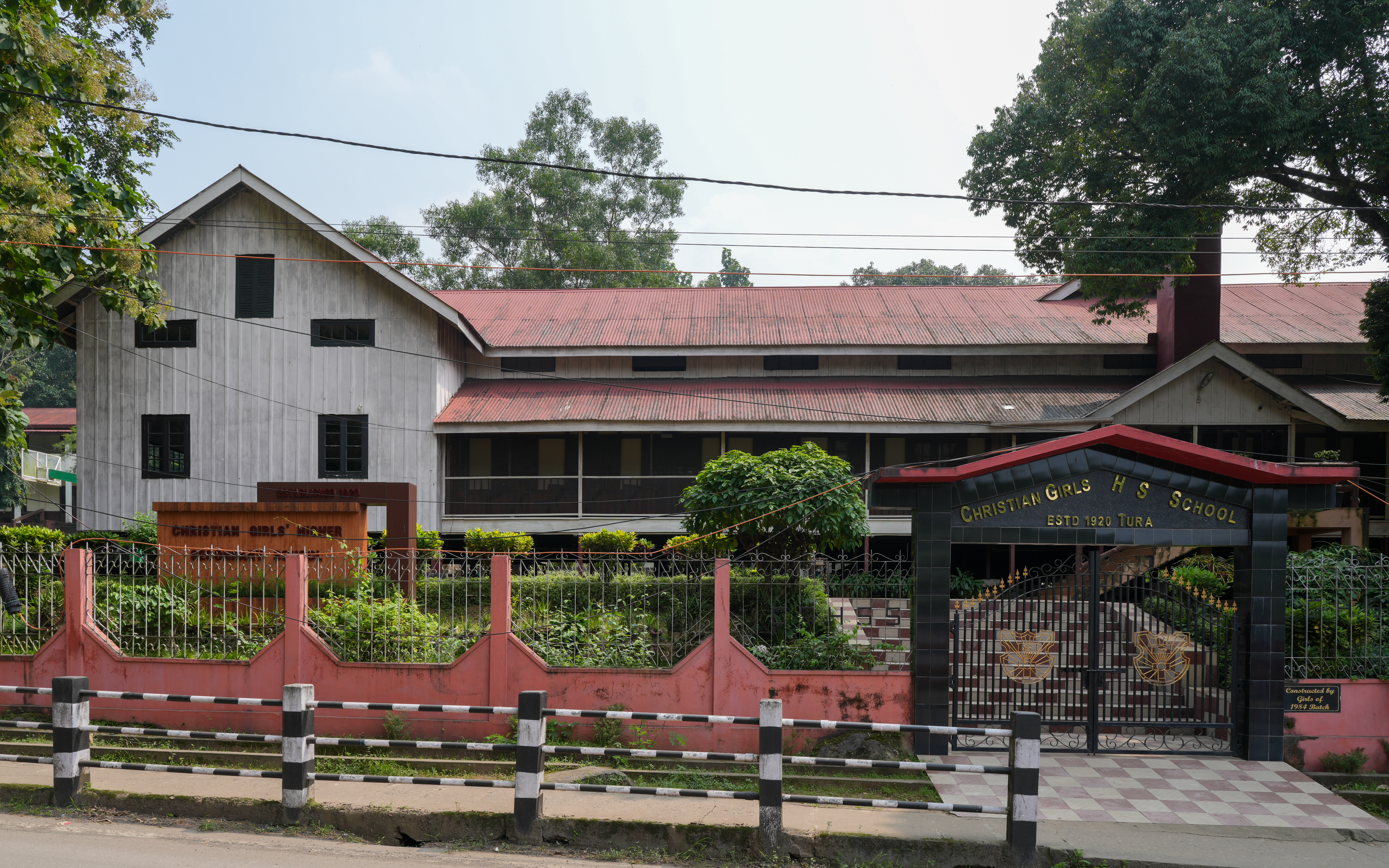
- Entrance and front facade
- Tura, Meghalaya; India

Information
- Motto: Knowledge For Excellence
- Established: 1920
- Founder: American Baptist Mission
- School district: West Garo Hills
- Principal: Bethsida Cheran Momin, (2007/8 - 2012/13)
- Gender: Female
- Affiliation: Meghalaya Board of School Education, Tura

The Christian Girls Higher Secondary School is a secondary school in Tura, Meghalaya, India. It is the oldest school in the Garo Hills, and one of the oldest schools in the state of Meghalaya. It was established in 1920, in its present location. The history of its formation dates back to 1874.

== History ==
Mentions of schools for Garo girls were first made by Dr. Miles Bronson in 1868; followed by Dr. Stoddard who wrote of a girls' school at Rajasimla. In 1874 Mrs. Keith opened a Boarding School for Garo girls in Goalpara. When M. C. Mason and E. G. Phillips arrived in Goalpara, they asked the 'Women's Society' for a special school for Garo girls. As a result, Ms. Marian Russell arrived in Tura in 1879, with the specific purpose of opening such a school. In 1883, Ms. Russell went to Nishangram and built a school out of bamboo. Thirty eight girls, mostly grown-ups, came to her.

The school was formally established in 1920, making it the oldest school in the Garo Hills and one of the oldest in Meghalaya. The last American missionary principal of the school was Zelda Bate. After her, Graciefields K Marak took charge as the first Garo principal. A high school section was started in 1961, with the first students graduating in 1965. In February 2020, the school celebrated its centenary.

== Curriculum ==
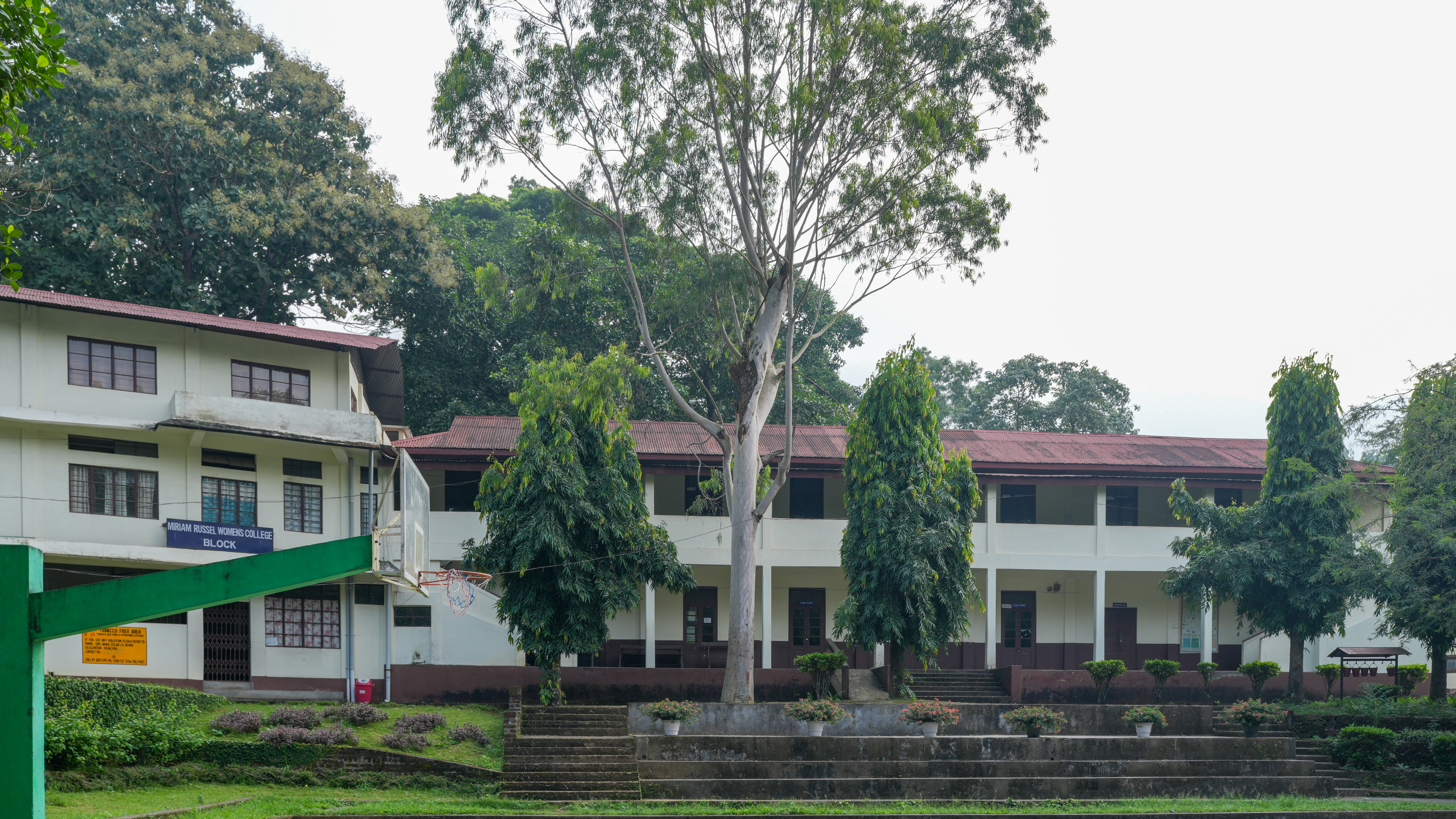
Classroom block in the sylvan campus

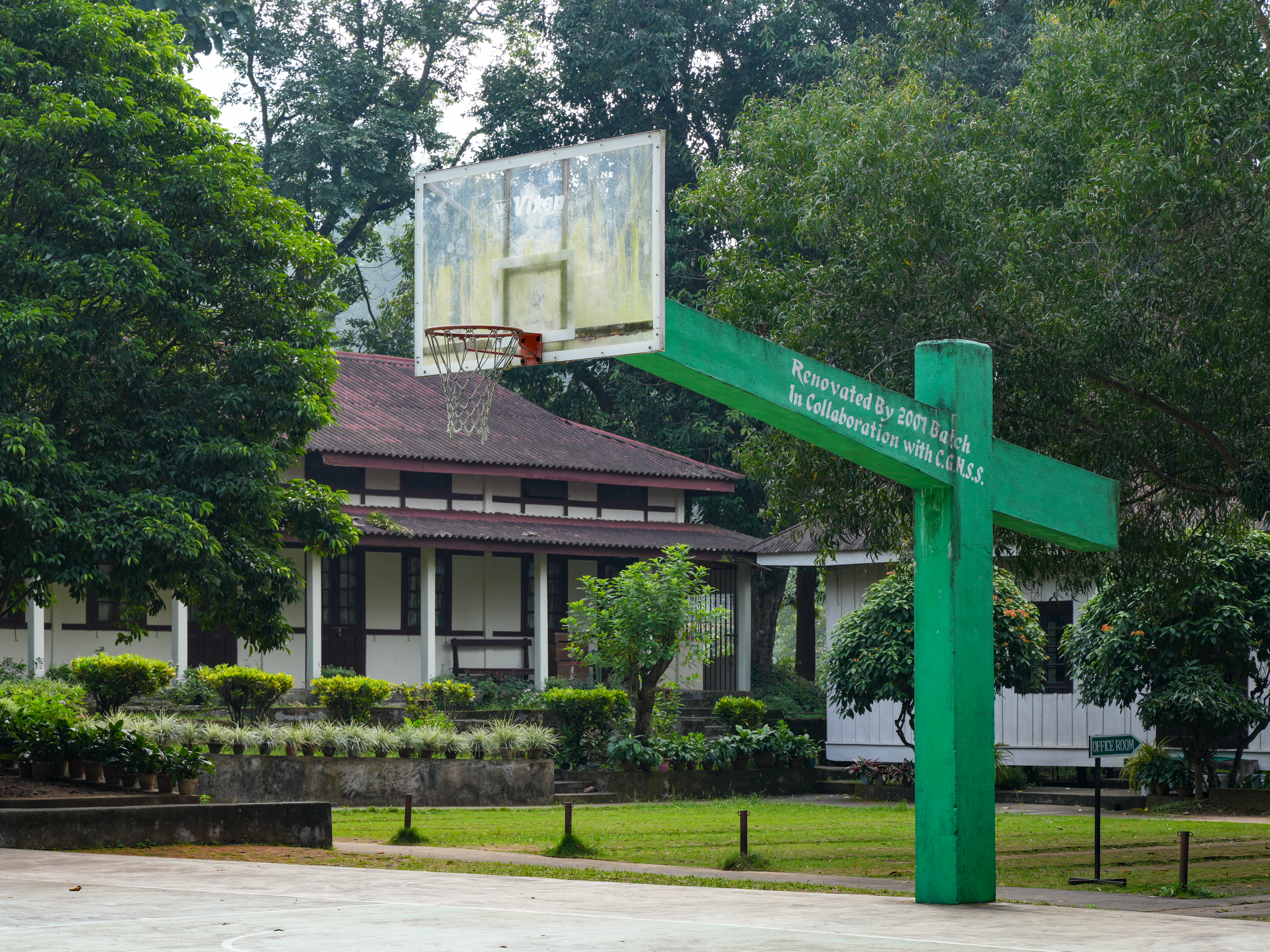
Basketball court sponsored by 2001 Batch

"Wangala", the traditional dance form of the Garos (known as "A`chik" in the local language) is taught as part of the school curriculum.
