= Baljek Airport =

Airport of Meghalaya, India

- IATA: none; ICAO: VETU

Summary
- Airport type: Public
- Operator: Government of Meghalaya
- Serves: Tura, Meghalaya, India
- Location: Baljek
- Elevation AMSL: 536 m (1,759 ft)
- Coordinates: 25°39′41″N 90°20′42″E

Map
- Location of the airport in Meghalaya VETU (India)

Runways
Direction	Length		Surface
Direction	m	ft	Surface
16/34	1,006	3,300

Baljek Airport (ICAO: VETU) (also known as Tura Airport) is a public airport located at Baljek, West Garo Hills district of Meghalaya. It is one of the smallest airports in India, located 33 km (21 mi) North-east of Tura.

== History ==
The proposal for the airport was sent to the Indian Government in 1983 and the project was sanctioned in 1995. The airport was inaugurated in October 2008 by then president Pratibha Patil. It was then built at a cost of ₹12.52 crore and was initially designed to handle 20 seater aircraft like the Dornier 228. The short airport runway is 1.1km long and with 30m wide, planned for STOL (Short Take-Off and Landing). At the inaugration, a four-seater Cessna and a nine-seater Dornier arrived from Guwahati. However, commercial flight operations did not start thereafter.

Later, the Airports Authority of India (AAI) intended to develop the airport for operation of ATR 42/ATR 72 type of aircraft. The 3,300 foot runway was planned to be extended by another 1,200 feet. A total of 58 acres of additional land was acquired at a cost of ₹2.58 crore to aid the expansion of the airport.

In July 2026, Meghalaya Chief Minister Conrad Sangma announced that the Central government's Ministry of Civil Aviation had approved ₹60 crore to upgrade the airport. The improved infrastructure would enable flight operations.

== Purpose ==
In 2008 Meghalaya's State Planning Board chairperson, P. A. Sangma, had suggested that the airport would boost export of horticulture produce from the state.
