= List of Monuments of National Importance in Meghalaya =

This is a list of Monuments of National Importance (ASI) as officially recognized by and available through the website of the Archaeological Survey of India in the Indian state Meghalaya. The monument identifier is a combination of the abbreviation of the subdivision of the list (state, ASI circle) and the numbering as published on the website of the ASI. 8 Monuments of National Importance have been recognized by the ASI in Meghalaya.

See also:

- List of Monuments of National Importance in India for other Monuments of National Importance in India
- List of State Protected Monuments in Meghalaya

SL. No.	Description	Location	Address	District	Coordinates	Image
N-ML-1	Megalithic Bridge on the Um-Nyakaneth, between Jaraem and Syndai	Um-Nyakaneth River		West Jaintia Hills district	25°17′16″N 92°07′26″E	Upload Photo
N-ML-2	Megalithic Bridge known as Thulum-wi between Jowai and Jarain, Maput,	Maput		Jaintia Hills	25°20′49″N 92°08′40″E	Megalithic Bridge known as Thulum-wi between Jowai and Jarain, Maput,
N-ML-3	Megalithic Bridge on the Um-Kumbeh	Um-Kumbeh		West Jaintia Hills district	25°10′37″N 92°08′08″E	Upload Photo
N-ML-4	Stone memorial of U.Mawthaw - dur-briew, Nartiang	Nartiang		West Jaintia Hills district	25°34′26″N 92°12′59″E	Stone memorial of U.Mawthaw - dur-briew, Nartiang More images
N-ML-5	Tank, Syndai	Syndai		West Jaintia Hills district	25°10′42″N 92°08′02″E	Upload Photo
N-ML-6	Stone memorial of U-Mawthoh-dur, Bhoi Country	Bhoi Country		Ri-Bhoi district		Upload Photo
N-ML-7	Scott's Memorials, Cherrapunji	Cherrapunji		East Khasi Hills district	25°16′23″N 91°44′03″E	Scott's Memorials, Cherrapunji More images
N-ML-8	Manipur Memorial, Shillong	Shillong		East Khasi Hills district	25°34′12″N 91°53′04″E	Upload Photo
