= List of State Protected Monuments in Meghalaya =

This is a list of State Protected Monuments as officially reported by and available through the website of the Archaeological Survey of India in the Indian state Meghalaya. The monument identifier is a combination of the abbreviation of the subdivision of the list (state, ASI circle) and the numbering as published on the website of the ASI. 4 State Protected Monuments have been recognized by the ASI in Meghalaya. Besides the State Protected Monuments, also the Monuments of National Importance in this state might be relevant.

== List of state protected monuments ==
| SL. No. | Description | Location | Address | District | Coordinates | Image |
|---|---|---|---|---|---|---|
| S-ML-1 | Excavated Temple | | | West Garo hills | | Upload Photo |
| S-ML-2 | Excavated Temple | | | West Garo hills | | Upload Photo |
| S-ML-3 | Buddhist Stupa | | | West Garo hills | | Buddhist Stupa |
| S-ML-4 | Fortress | | | West Garo hills | | Fortress |

== See also ==
- List of State Protected Monuments in India for other State Protected Monuments in India
- List of Monuments of National Importance in Meghalaya
