= Garo people =

Ethnic group of Indian subcontinent

Garo
A∙chik
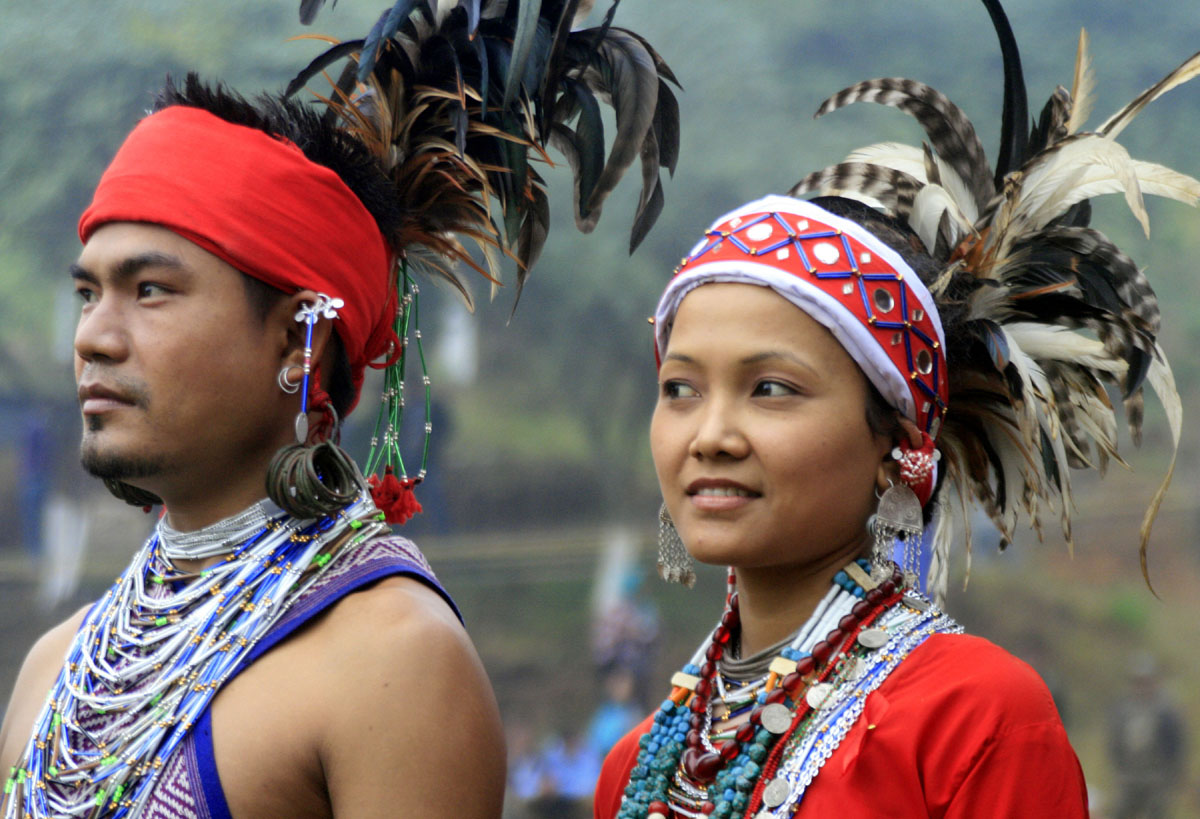
- A Garo couple in traditional attire

Total population
- 1.2 million (c. 2011)

Regions with significant populations
- India • Bangladesh
- India: 997,716
  - Meghalaya: 821,026
  - Assam: 136,077
  - Tripura: 12,952
- Bangladesh: 120,000

Languages
- Garo (A∙chikku)

Religion
- Majority ~ Christianity (90%); Minority ~ Songsarek, Animism

Related ethnic groups
- Bodo-Kachari groups; Boro, Hajong, Rabha, Koch, Dimasa, Tripuri, Konyak people, other Tibeto Burman peoples, Atong, Ruga

The Garo people are a Sal-speaking ethnic group who live mostly in the Northeast Indian state of Meghalaya, with a smaller number in neighbouring Bangladesh. They are the second-largest indigenous people in Meghalaya after the Khasi and comprise about a third of the local population. They also reside in the Mymensingh Division of Bangladesh including the Jamalpur, Sherpur, and Mymensingh districts.

== Etymology ==
Historically, the name Garo was used for a large number of different peoples living on the southern bank of Brahmaputra River, Garos refers themselves A∙chik Mande (literally "hill people," from A∙chik "bite soil" and mande "people") or simply A∙chik or Mande, with the name "Garo" now being used by outsiders as an exonym.

== History ==
According to oral tradition, the Garo people first migrated to the Garo Hills from Tibet (referred to as Tibotgre) around 400 BC, under the leadership of Jappa Jalimpa, Sukpa, and Bongepa, crossing the Brahmaputra River (Songdu Chibima) and temporarily settling in the river valley. The Garo finally settled down in Garo Hills (East-West Garo Hills), finding providence and security in this uncharted territory and claiming it as their own. Records of the tribe by expanding Mughal armies and by East India Company officials in what is now Bangladesh wrote of the warlike nature of the people. The earliest written records about the Garo date from around 1800, and were described by officials of the East India Company as follows: "... looked upon as bloodthirsty savages, who inhabited a tract of hills covered with almost impenetrable jungle, the climate of which was considered so deadly as to make it impossible for a white man to live there. The Garo had the reputation of being fierce headhunters, the social status of a man being decided by the number of heads he owned".

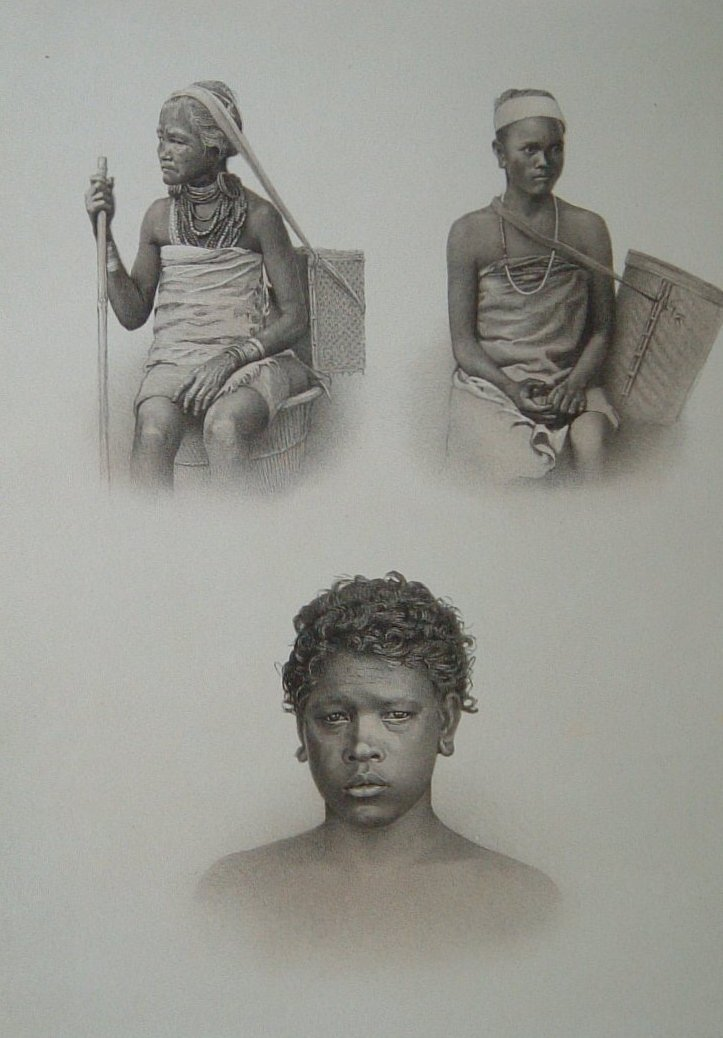
Garo women and a Garo boy

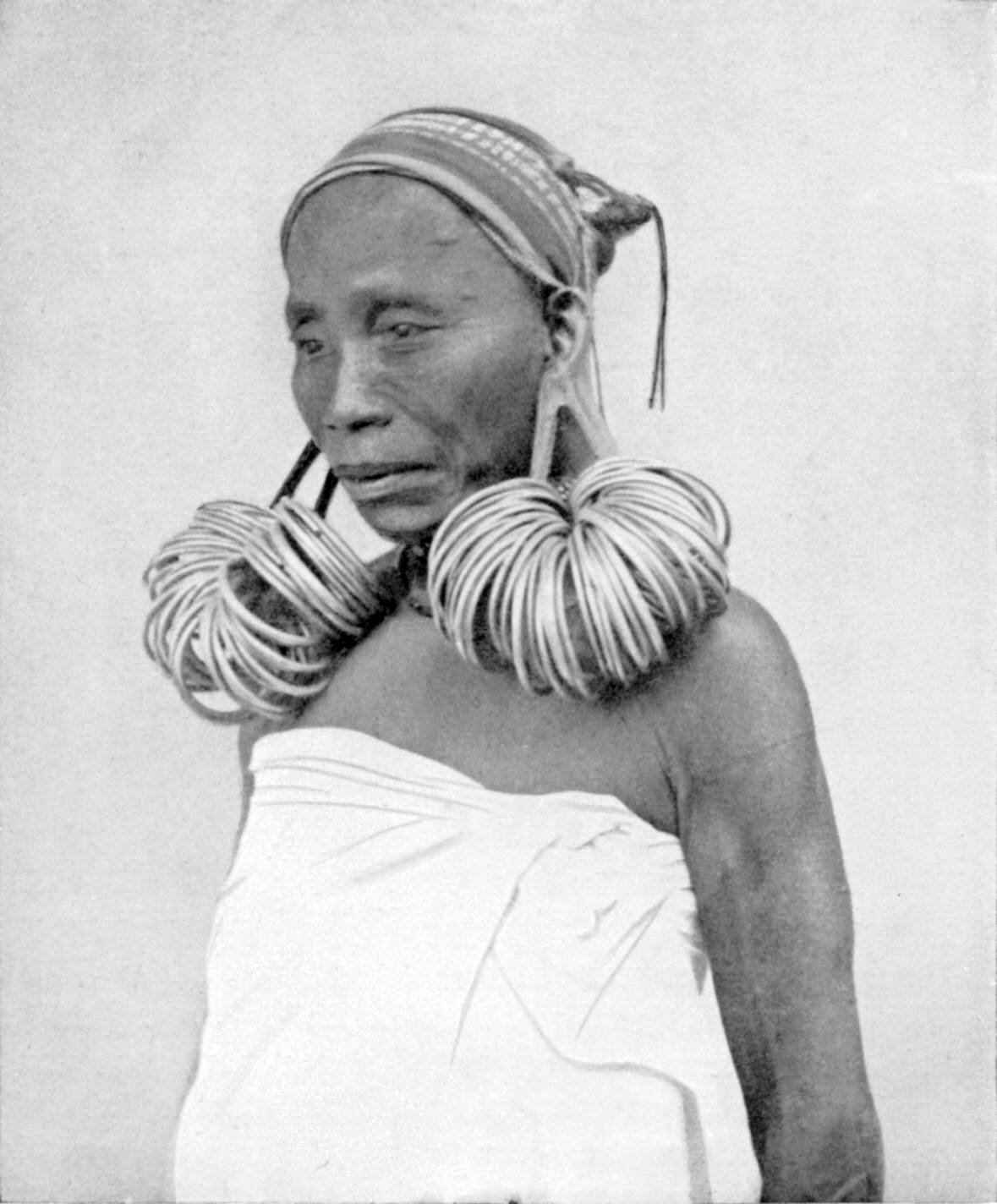
A Garo woman, 1912

In December 1872, the Government of India dispatched a military expedition to the Garo Hills to establish control over the region. The campaign was conducted from three sides – south, east, and west. The Garo warriors (matgriks) confronted them at the Battle of Rongrenggre, equipped with spears, swords, and shields. Inevitably, the Garo were defeated in the battle, lacking the guns or mortars of the army.

By the early 1900s, the American Baptist Mission was active in the area, working from Tura, Meghalaya.

Two early histories of the Garo people were written by deputy commissioner for Eastern Bengal and Assam Major A. Playfair, The Garos (1909), and by Sinha T.C., The Psyche of Garos (1955).

== Geographical distribution ==
The Garo are mainly distributed over the Garo Hills, Khasi Hills, Ri-Bhoi districts in Meghalaya, Kamrup, Goalpara, Sivasagar, and Karbi Anglong districts of Assam, in India. In Bangladesh, lesser numbers are found in Tangail, Jamalpur, Sherpur, Mymensingh, Netrokona, Sunamganj, Sylhet and Gazipur with the highest concentration in Haluaghat Upazila and Dhobaura of Mymensingh district, Durgapur upazila and Kalmakanda upazila of Netrokona district, Nalitabari upazila and Jhenaigati upazila of Sherpur and Madhupur upazila of Tangail district. A majority of Garo village or locality names end with -gre. For example, Dakopgre, Cherangre, Goeragre, Simsanggre, etc. There are also names with the ending - para, e.g. Salmanpara, Asipara, Marakapara, etc. Para is a corruption of -bra or Bibra (means Junction), which was the result of a census error. Similarly, the village name Asipara is a corruption of the historical place name Asibra. However, the village is listed in census and government records under the name Asipara. This replacement of original names can be seen as a threat to Garo's cultural identity.

It is estimated that the total Garo population in Meghalaya, Assam, Nagaland, Tripura, West Bengal, Canada, the US, Europe, Australia, and Bangladesh combined is more than 1 million.

Garo is also found scattered in the Indian state of Tripura. The recorded Garo population was around 6,000 in 1971.

Garo form minority groups in Cooch Behar, Jalpaiguri, Darjeeling and West Dinajpur of West Bengal, as well as in Nagaland. The present generation of Garo forming minority groups in these states of India does not generally speak their ethnic language any longer.

Garo also forms small communities in various other parts of the world including Canada, America, Australia, and the United Kingdom.

== Religion ==
Today, most Garos in India follow Christianity with a few practicing the traditional Garo animist religion, Songsarek. The latter includes deities who must be appeased with rituals, ceremonies, and animal sacrifices to ensure the welfare of the tribe.

Ramke W. Momin was the first Christian Garo member and was born in Goalpara district in the 1830s.

In Bangladesh, 56.02% of Garos consider themselves practitioners of Christianity, while of the remaining population, most are practitioners of Songsarek.

In India, a small percentage of the Garo population practices Buddhism, estimated at 0.40%.

The term "Dakbewal" is often used to describe Garo culture. In 2000, the group called "Risi Jilma" was founded to safeguard the ancient Garo Songsarek religion. Seeing the Songsarek population in decline, youth from the Dadenggiri subdivision of Garo Hills felt the need to preserve the Songsarek culture. The Rishi Jilma group is active in about 480 villages in and around Garo Hills.

== Language ==
Bangladeshi Garo man singing a folk song in Garo language at Ramgarh, Khagrachori

The Garo language belongs to the Tibeto-Burman language family. Brief lists of Garo words were compiled by East India Company officials in 1800, and Garo acquired a Latin-based writing system in the late 19th century. This system was devised by American Baptist missionaries, based on a northeastern dialect of Garo. A·beng or Am·beng, Matabeng, Atong, Me·gam, Matchi, Dual [Matchi-Dual], Ruga, Chibok, Chisak, Gara, Gan·ching [Gara-Gan·ching], A·we etc are few among the dialects of Garo people. The first translation of the Garo Bible was published in 1924 and the official language in schools and government offices is now English.

== Social structure ==
The Garo are one of the few remaining matrilineal societies in the world, and Garo individuals take their clan titles from their mothers. Traditionally, the youngest daughter (nokmechik) inherits property from her mother. Sons leave their parents' house at puberty and are trained in the village bachelor dormitory (nokpante). After getting married, the man lives in his wife's house.

In Garo tradition, the house where unmarried male youths live is called Nokpante. Traditionally, women were forbidden from entering the Nokpante, and any woman who broke this rule was considered tainted or "marang nangjok." However, this taboo is less common in the present day.

Despite the matrilineal nature of Garo society, it can not accurately be described as matriarchal. While the property is owned by women, the governing of society and domestic affairs and the management of the property is carried out by men.

While Garo people have traditional names, modern Garo culture has been greatly influenced by Christianity.

=== Marriage ===
In Garo society, marriage is traditionally arranged, with a strong emphasis on clan exogamy, meaning individuals marry outside their own clan. A distinctive practice among the Garo is "marriage by capture," known as "Chawarisikka," where the prospective groom is captured by the bride's family, symbolising the union. After marriage, the husband typically resides in his wife's household, reflecting the matrilineal nature of Garo society.

== Culture ==
=== Clothing ===
The traditional dress of Garo Women is Dakmanda, Dakshari. But in the present day, jeans, Sari, T-shirts, and pajamas are also worn. By contrast, Garo men wear jeans, T-shirts, and shirts.

=== Ornaments ===
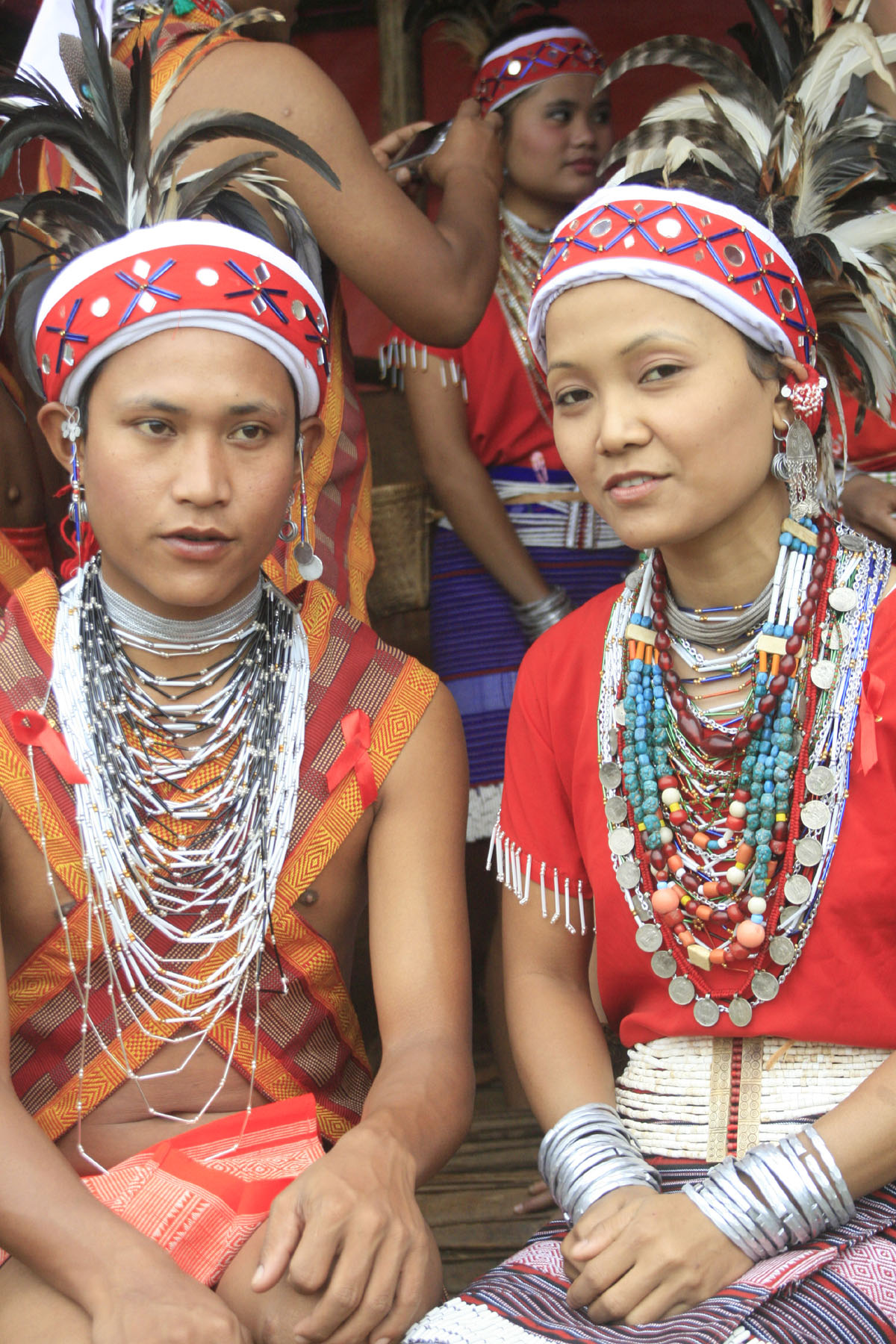
Garo men and women in traditional attire

Both men and women enjoy adorning themselves with ornaments:

- Nadongbi or sisa – made of a brass ring worn in the lobe of the ear
- Nadirong – brass ring worn in the upper part of the ear
- Natapsi – the string of beads worn in the upper part of the ear
- Jaksan – bangles of different materials and sizes
- Ripok – necklaces made of long barrel-shaped beads of cornelian or red glass while some are made of brass or silver and are worn on special occasions
- Jaksil – elbow ring is worn by rich men on Gana ceremonies

The dresses of Meghalaya worn by the Garo tribe vary depending on the place of residence of the people. Women who belong to remote villages in the Garo hills wear an eking, a small cloth worn around the waist.

- Penta – a small piece of ivory struck into the upper part of the ear projecting upwards, parallel to the side of the head
- Seng·ki – waistband consisting of several rows of conch shells, worn by women
- Pilne – head ornament wore by women during dances

=== Weapons ===
One of the principal Garo weapons is a two-edged sword called mil·am made of a single piece of iron from hilt to point. There is a cross-bar between the hilt and the blade where a bunch of ox's tail hair is attached. Other types of weapons include shield, spear, bow and arrow, axe, dagger, etc.

=== Cuisine ===
The staple Garo food is rice. Kochu (taro), millet, maize, and tapioca are important substitutes for rice in times when it becomes scarce. Other foods such as kochu, dried fish, bamboo shoots, sorrell, sweet potato, pumpkin, gourd, and banana are also popular.

The Garo have traditionally used a kind of potash in curries, which is obtained by burning dry pieces of plantain stems or young bamboo, known locally as kalchi or katchi. After these stems are burnt, the ashes are collected and dipped in water; these ashes are then strained in conical shapes in a bamboo strainer. However, cooking soda is more commonly used as a replacement for this 'ash water' by Garo nowadays.

Garo are known to ferment a special type of rice to create a liquor named "Minil Bichi". This 'country liquor' plays an important role in the life of the Garo.

The sacred drink of the Garos is Chu. Garo children are given it to drink at birth, and visiting guests are traditionally offered it as well.

== Festivals ==
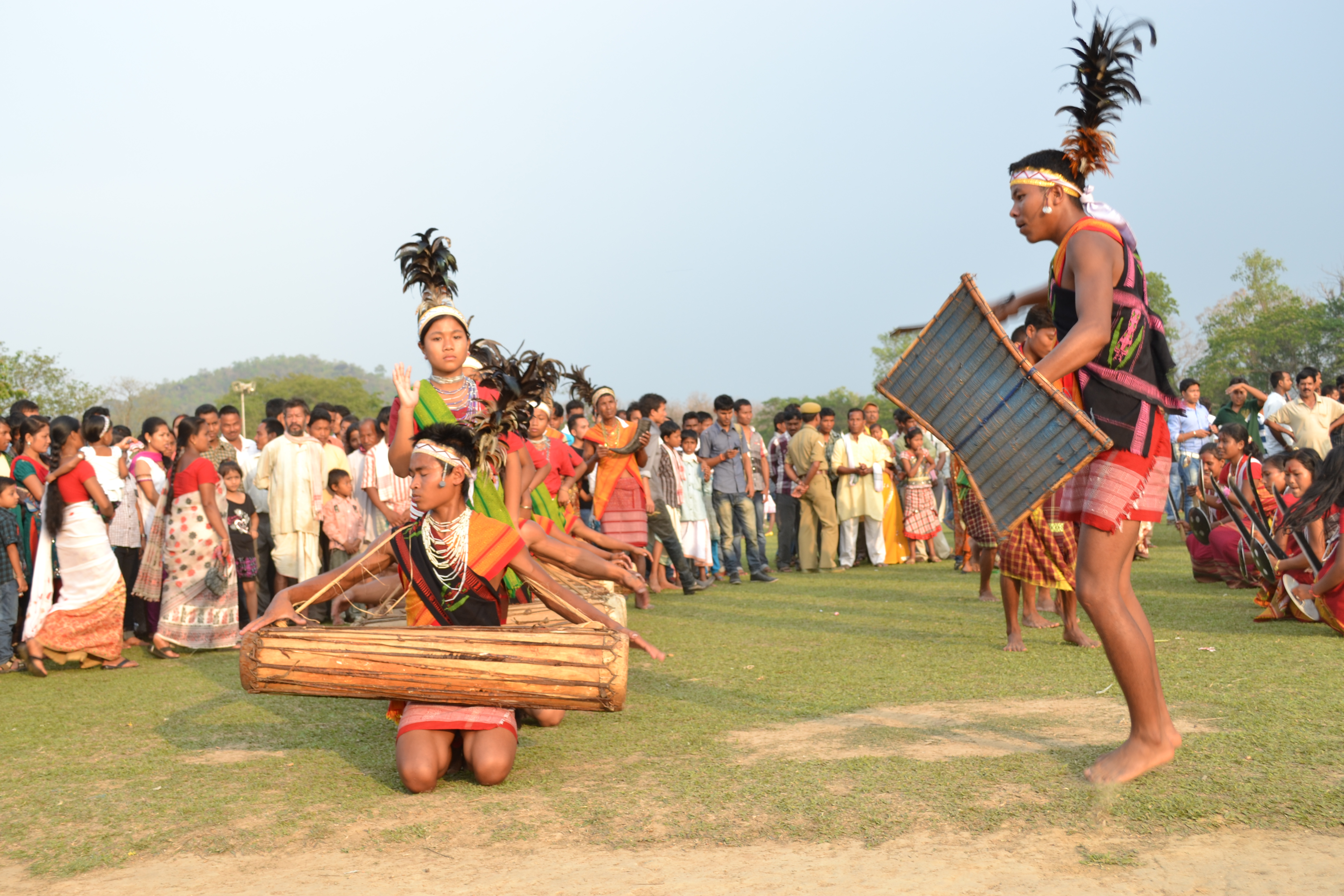
Garo people performing on Wangala festival

Most Garo festivals are based on the agricultural cycle of crops. The harvesting festival Wangala is the biggest celebration of the tribe happening in the month of October or November every year. It is the thanksgiving after harvest in honour of the god Saljong, provider of nature's bounties.

Other festivals include Gal·mak Goa, Agalmaka, etc.

=== Asanang Wangala ===
The '100-drum festival' is held in Asanang near Tura in the West Garo Hills, Meghalaya, India usually in October or November. Thousands of people, especially young people, gather at Asanang and celebrate Wangala. Garo girls known as nomil and boys (pante) take part in 'Wangala' festivals. The pantes beat a kind of long drum called dama in groups and play bamboo flutes. The nominals with colourful costumes dance to the tune of dama and folk songs in a circle.

=== Dhaka Wangala ===
The Wangala festival is held by Garo in Dhaka every year, usually in November or December. It is estimated that 30,000 Garo are living in Dhaka, and this festival is one way that they can be seen to preserve Garo Culture and traditions. For the Wangala festival, the Garo travel from every corner of the city to the Lalmatia Housing Society ground to gather and celebrate. Approximately 10,000 people attend the celebration per year. It consists of an energetic rally with traditional dress and drum performances. Speeches from special guests are another highlight of the festival. The AMUA for Misi Saljon takes place by the original Kamal of the villages. Display stalls are arranged with traditional food, dress, and other materials. There is also a souvenir publication from the Nokma Parishad where the Prime Minister's Message is included. It is a festival of great significance for the Garo in Dhaka.

=== Christmas ===
Though Christmas is a religious celebration, December is a great season of celebration in Garo Hills. In the first week of December, the town of Tura and all other smaller towns are illuminated with lights. This celebration features worship, dance, merry-making, grand feasts, and social visits goes on till 10 January. People from all religions and sections take part in the Christmas celebration. In December 2003 the tallest Christmas tree in the world was erected at Dobasipara, Tura by the Baptist boys of Dobasipara. Its height was 119.3 feet, covered by BBC and widely broadcast on television. The tree was decorated with 16,319 coloured light bulbs; it took about 14 days to complete the decoration.

=== Ahaia Winter Festival ===
The annual festival, conceptualised in 2008, is aimed to promote and brand this part of the region as a popular tourist destination by giving an opportunity for the local people to showcase their skills and expertise. The three-day fest features a gala event with a carnival, cultural show, food festival, rock concert, wine festival, angling competition, ethnic wear competition, children's fancy dress, DJ Nite, exhibitions, house, and other games. The entry forms for carnival and other events are available at the Tourist Office, Tura.

==== Simsang Festival ====
It was first started in 2006 in Williamnagar, Meghalaya. Simsang festival was known as the Winter festival before and it promotes the talents of the local people. It also promotes the local bands and the exhibition of handcrafts made by local people. It also promotes the indigenous games of Garo.

== Notable people ==
=== India ===
- Zenith Sangma, politician
- Limison D. Sangma, politician
- Thomas A. Sangma, politician
- Rupa M. Marak, politician
- Mehtab Sangma, politician
- Gilbertson Sangma, India international footballer.
- Agatha Sangma, politician.
- Conrad K Sangma, politician.
- Numal Momin, Deputy Speaker of the Assam Legislative Assembly since 2021.
- James Pangsang K Sangma, politician.
- Martin Danggo Marak, politician.
- Mukul M. Sangma, politician.
- Purno A. Sangma, politician.
- Pa Togan Nengminja Sangma, freedom fighter.
- Ramke W. Momin, educationist and philosopher.
- S. C. Marak, politician.
- Sanford Marak, politician.
- Timothy D Shira, politician.
- Williamson A. Sangma, politician.
- Saleng A. Sangma, politician

=== Bangladesh ===
- Jewel Arengh, politician.
- Debinash Sangma, Pakistan international footballer.
- Maria Manda Sangma, Bangladesh women's international footballer.
- Promode Mankin Sangma, politician.
- Sheuli Azim Marak, Bangladesh women's international footballer.
