= Tura, Meghalaya =

Tura
- Town
- Location in Meghalaya, India
- Coordinates: 25.52°N 90.22°E
- Country: India
- State: Meghalaya
- District: West Garo Hills
- District council: GHADC
- Elevation: 349–1,181.10 m (1,145.0–3,875.0 ft)

Population (2011)
  - Total: 74,858

Languages
  - Official: Garo
- Time zone: UTC+5:30 (IST)
- Telephone code: 03651
- Vehicle registration: ML 08
- Climate: Cwa

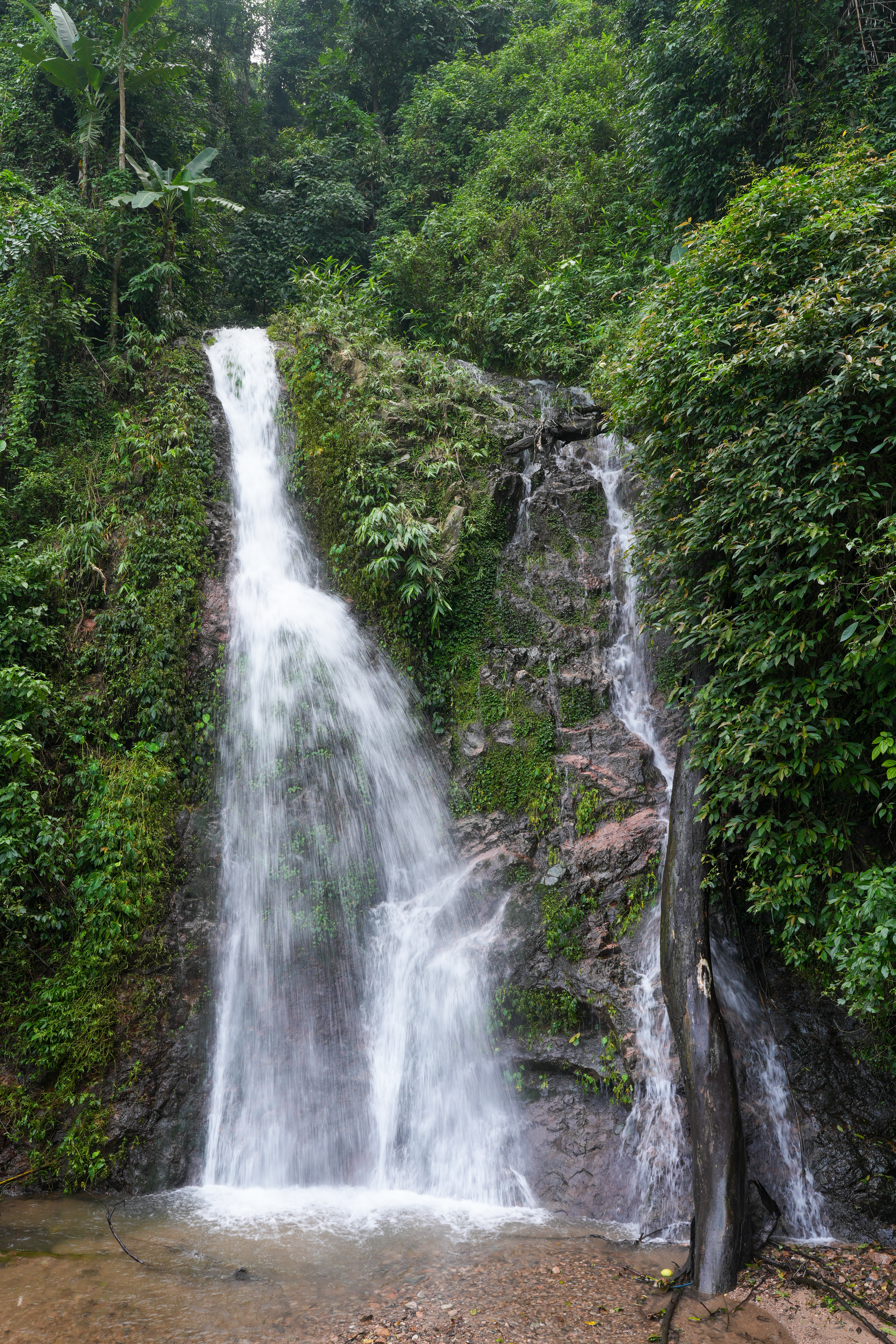
Gandrak Dare waterfalls

Tura (IPA: ˈtʊərə) is a municipality in the West Garo Hills district of the Indian state of Meghalaya. One of the largest towns in Meghalaya, Tura is located in the foothills of the Nokrek range of Garo Hills. The climate in Tura is moderate throughout the year.Tura is a cultural and administrative centre of the Garo tribe. It is also the district headquarters of the West Garo Hills district. It is filled with small rivulets and green valleys. The principal languages are Garo and English. The city has four colleges and multiple secondary schools.

== Etymology ==
When the British came to the Garo Hills, Tura was known as Dura. The British called the place Tura as it was easier for them to pronounce.

== History ==
In the early 19th century, when the British controlled Assam, the Garo Hills were left unadministered owing to the serious malaria in that area. With the need to control raids from the Garos, the British established permanent headquarters at Tura in 1867. Soon, American Baptist missionaries arrived in the Garo Hills, followed shortly thereafter by Catholic missionaries. As a result, today nearly three-quarters of Garos are Christians and Tura has many Christian institutions.

== Geography and climate ==
Tura is located at 25.52°N 90.22°E. It has an average elevation of 349 metres (1145 feet). Its climate is a Humid Subtropical climate (Köppen climate classification: Cwa).

The capital city of Shillong is 323 kilometres away and can be accessed via buses or the shuttle helicopter service. The border of Bangladesh, Dalu, is situated at a proximity of 50 km. Tura is 220 kilometres from Guwahati, the largest city in the neighbouring state of Assam.

Climate data for Tura, Meghalaya (1961–1985, extremes 1949–1985)
Month	Jan	Feb	Mar	Apr	May	Jun	Jul	Aug	Sep	Oct	Nov	Dec	Year
Record high °C (°F)	31.5 (88.7)	35.9 (96.6)	37.2 (99.0)	38.5 (101.3)	39.4 (102.9)	36.9 (98.4)	39.1 (102.4)	36.8 (98.2)	37.2 (99.0)	36.6 (97.9)	34.0 (93.2)	30.7 (87.3)	39.4 (102.9)
Mean daily maximum °C (°F)	22.7 (72.9)	24.8 (76.6)	29.0 (84.2)	30.4 (86.7)	29.7 (85.5)	29.1 (84.4)	28.6 (83.5)	28.7 (83.7)	29.0 (84.2)	28.8 (83.8)	26.4 (79.5)	23.3 (73.9)	27.5 (81.5)
Mean daily minimum °C (°F)	11.0 (51.8)	12.7 (54.9)	16.8 (62.2)	19.3 (66.7)	19.4 (66.9)	20.5 (68.9)	21.6 (70.9)	21.5 (70.7)	21.0 (69.8)	19.1 (66.4)	15.6 (60.1)	12.5 (54.5)	17.6 (63.7)
Record low °C (°F)	2.5 (36.5)	5.0 (41.0)	6.5 (43.7)	10.1 (50.2)	10.6 (51.1)	10.1 (50.2)	12.6 (54.7)	12.6 (54.7)	12.6 (54.7)	10.6 (51.1)	8.1 (46.6)	4.1 (39.4)	2.5 (36.5)
Average rainfall mm (inches)	9.2 (0.36)	9.3 (0.37)	52.5 (2.07)	165.7 (6.52)	423.7 (16.68)	555.8 (21.88)	669.9 (26.37)	422.4 (16.63)	345.8 (13.61)	173.3 (6.82)	15.0 (0.59)	3.3 (0.13)	2,845.9 (112.04)
Average rainy days	1.0	0.6	2.8	6.5	13.6	16.0	17.7	15.5	13.2	6.3	0.8	0.2	94.2
Average relative humidity (%) (at 17:30 IST)	65	59	56	67	72	80	82	84	82	78	70	68	72
Source: India Meteorological Department

== Demographics ==
Languages spoken in Tura (2011)
1. Garo (72.9%)
2. Bengali (16.2%)
3. Hindi (4.76%)
4. Nepali (2.15%)
5. Others (4.01%)
Religions in Tura (2011)
1. Christianity (72.7%)
2. Hinduism (25.5%)
3. Islam (1.18%)

The population of Tura Town is 74,858 according to the 2011 census. The indigenous Garo people form the majority of Tura's population. The population of Garo people in the town is 54,750, making up 73% of the city population. As of the 2011 Census of India, Tura had a population of 58,391. Males constitute 51% of the population and females 49%. Tura has an average literacy rate of 70%, higher than the national average of 56%: male literacy is 70%, and female literacy is 67%. In Tura, 14% of the population is under 6 years of age.

=== Language ===
Garo is spoken by 54,575 people, Bengali by 12,113, Hindi by 3,563, Nepali by 4,609 and 11,911 people speak other languages.

=== Religion ===
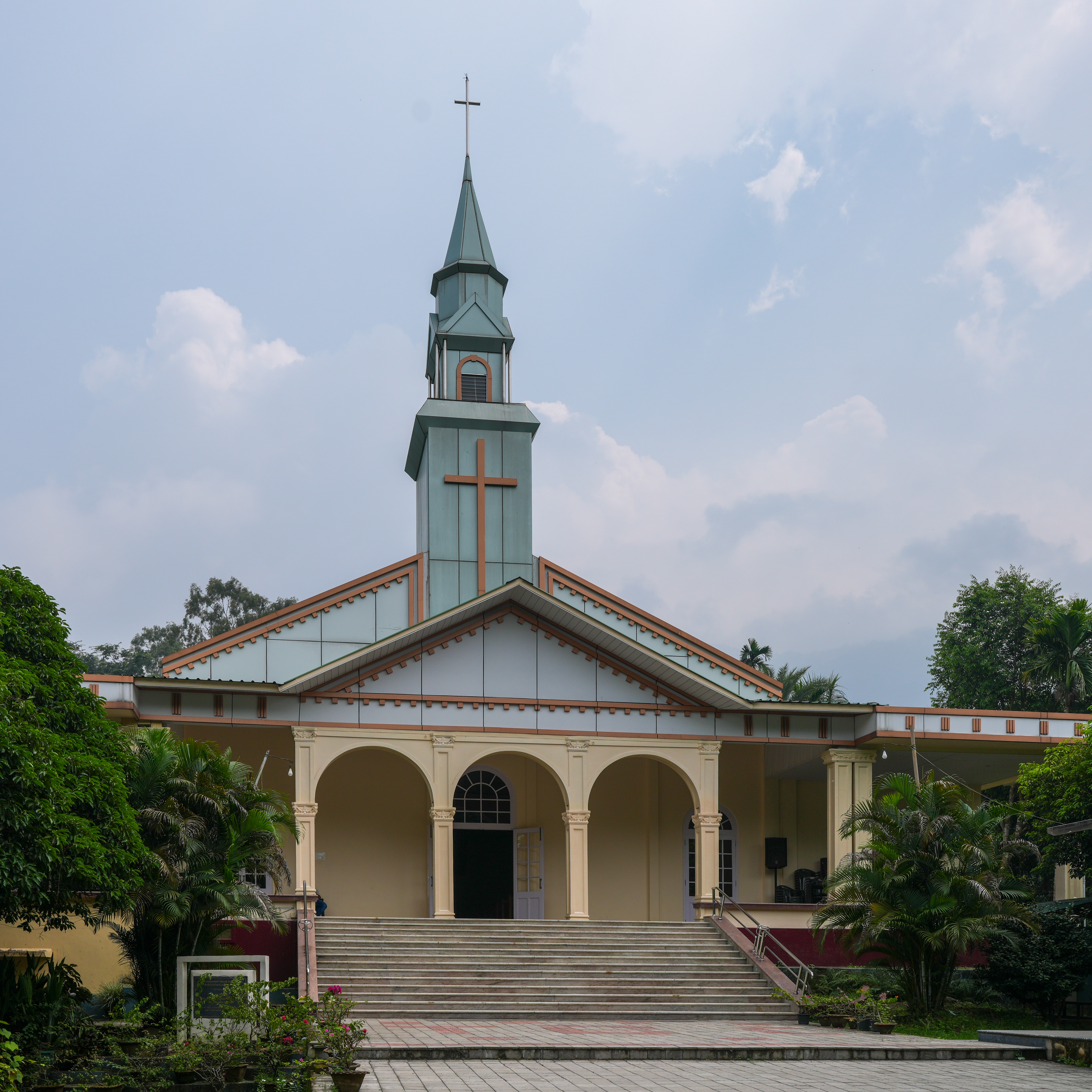
Tura Baptist Church, built 1966

Christianity is the main religion with about 73% of the population being Christian. There are different Christian denominations including Baptist, Catholic, Seventh Day Adventist, Church of Jesus Christ (COJC), and Christian Revival Church (CRC). In 1973, the town was made the seat of the Roman Catholic Diocese of Tura.

== Places of interest ==
There are many waterfalls and streams in Tura. Some of the water falls are Rongbangdare, Pelgadare, Gandrak Dare Falls etc. Some of the streams are Rangolwari, Nokmawari, Ganol, and Dachima.

Tura Peak (872 m (2,861 ft)) is on the eastern side of Tura. During the British rule, the Deputy Commissioner used to spend the summers in a cottage at Tura Peak. A path developed for his commuting to Tura, is today used by tourists to reach the peak.

Nearby popular tourist destinations include Balpakram, Nokrek, Siju Cave and Chitmang Peak.

== Education ==
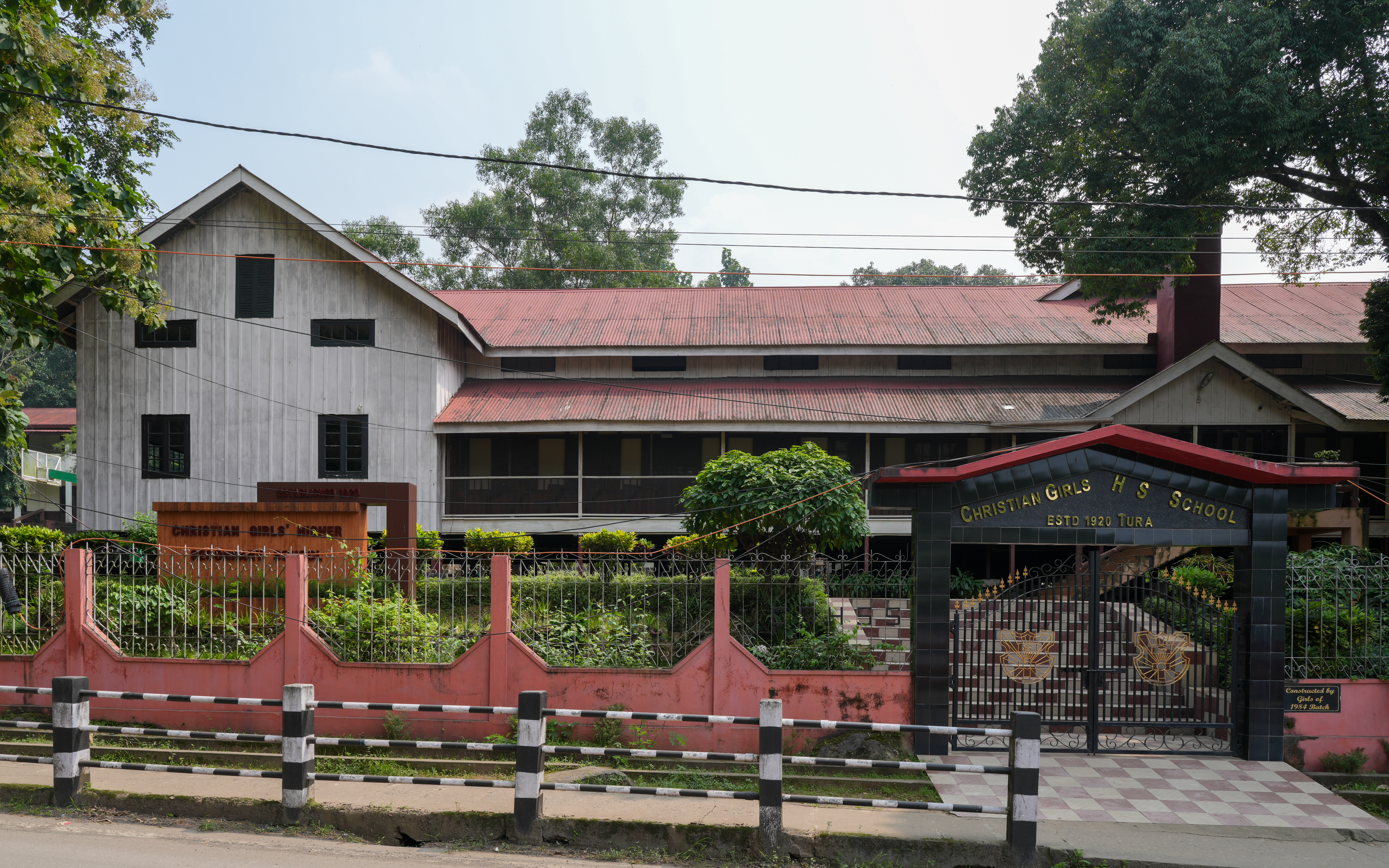
Christian Girls' Higher Secondary School

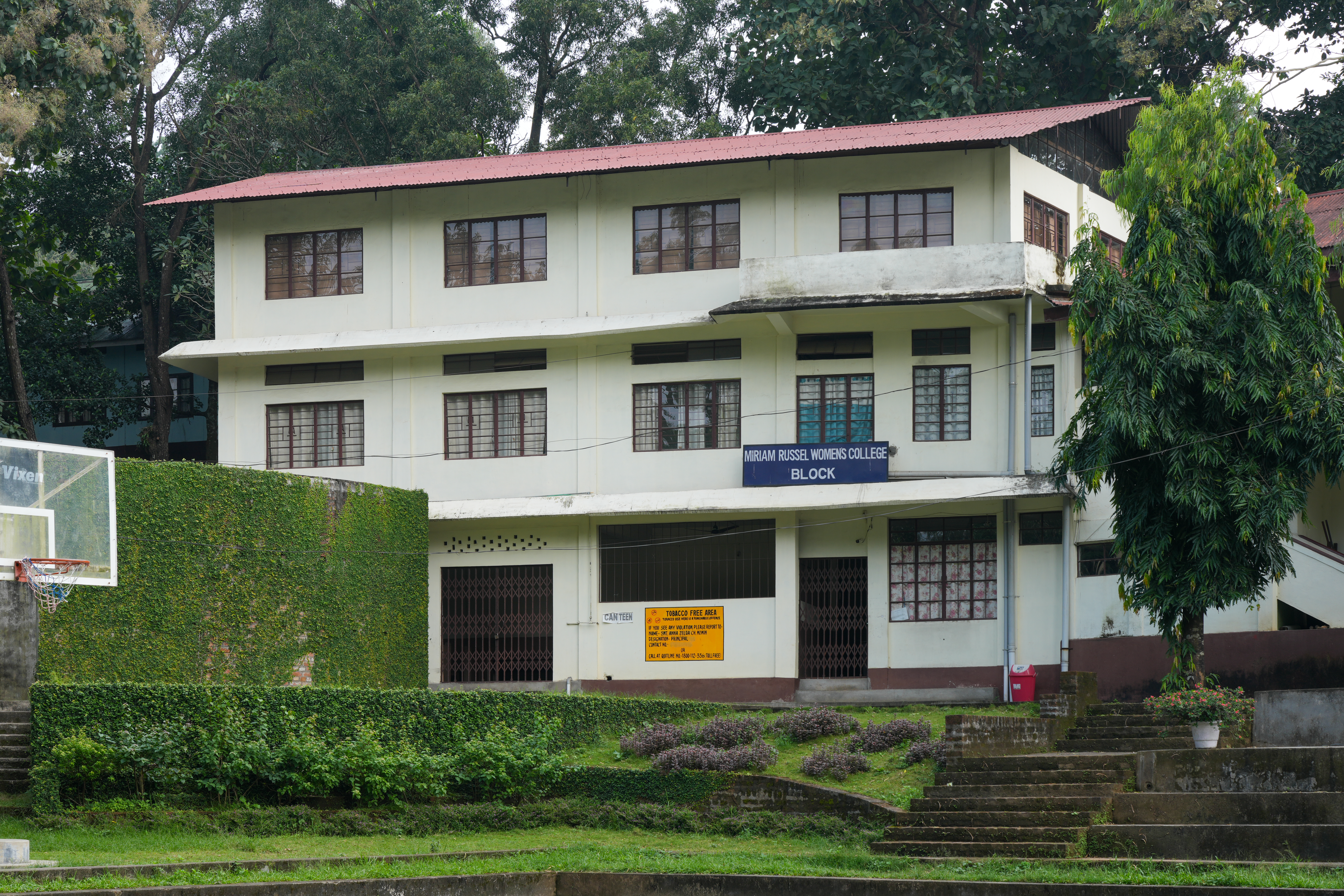
Miriam Russel Women's College

Baptist Christian missionaries brought education to the Garo Hills in the 19th century, starting the first school in Tura in 1920. In the 100 years since, Tura has grown into a hub of education. The West Garo Hills district website lists 11 schools and 10 higher education institutions in the town.

=== Schools ===
- Aeroville Higher Secondary School, Tura
- Captain Williams School, Tura
- Casarina Public School, Tura
- Christian Girls' Higher Secondary School (CGHSS) - the oldest school in the Garo Hills, established in 1920.
- Don Bosco Higher Secondary School, Tura
- Embee Rosebud Secondary School, Tura
- Government Boys Higher Secondary School, Tura
- Government Girls Higher Secondary School, Tura
- Kendriya Vidyalaya Tura
- St Mary’s Higher Secondary School, Tura
- St Xavier’s Higher Secondary School, Tura
- Tura United Christian Academy

=== Colleges and Universities ===
- College of Community Science, Tura
- College of Home Science (under Central Agricultural University, Imphal)
- College of Teachers Education, Tura
- Don Bosco College, Tura
- Durama College, Tura
- Harding Theological College
- ICFAI University, Tura Campus
- Martin Luther University, Tura Campus
- Miriam Russel Women's College - the first women's college in the Garo Hills region, established in 2022.
- North-Eastern Hill University, Tura Campus.
- Tura Christian College
- Tura College of Information Technology
- Tura Government College
- Tura Law College

=== Other institutes ===
- National Skill Training Institute for Women
- Food Craft Institute, Tura under NCHMCT, Noida.
- Tura Industrial Training Institute
- Tura Polytechnic

=== Libraries and museums ===
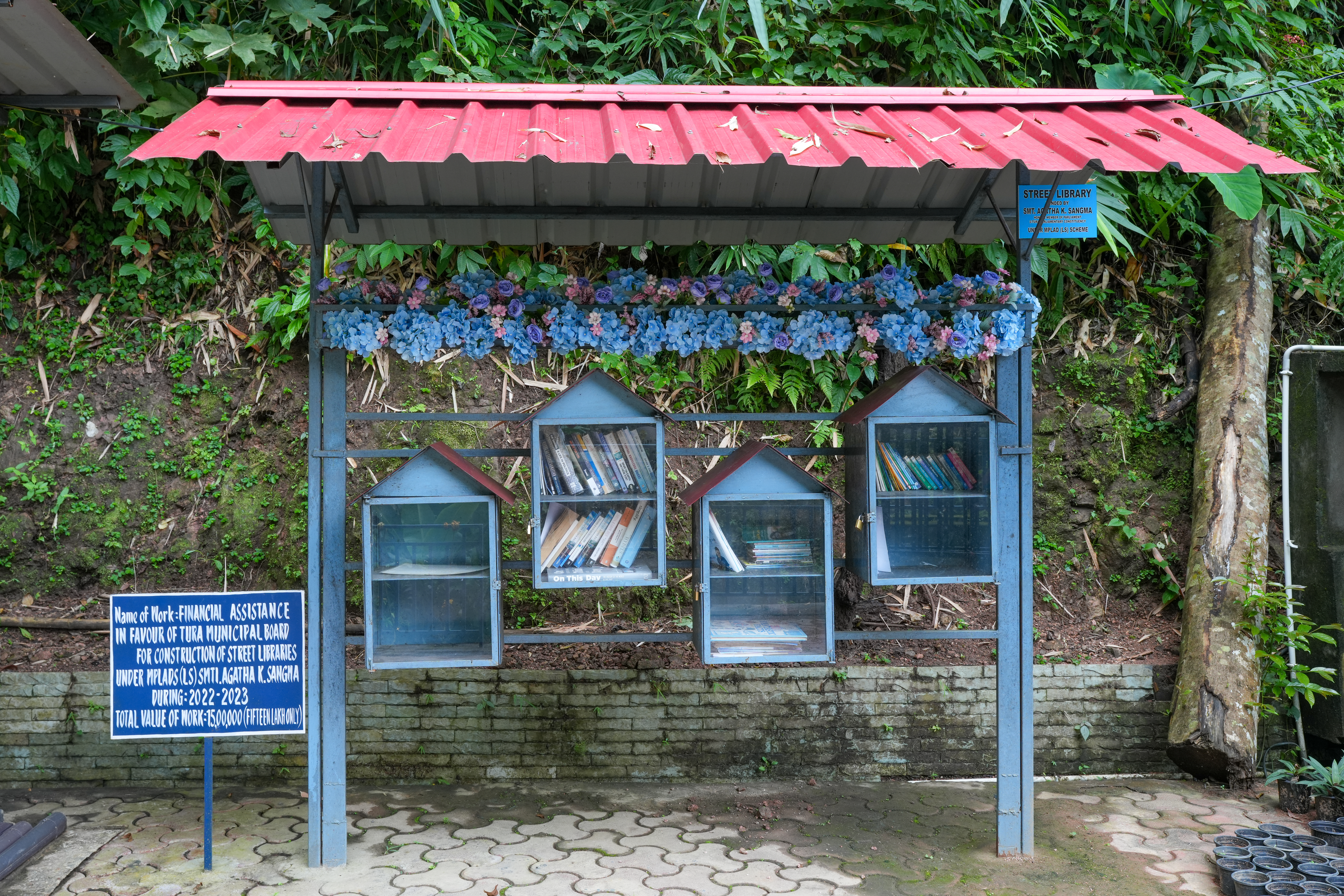
Street Library, Gandrak Dare

The Department of Arts and Culture, Government of Meghalaya has set up a District Library in Tura, under the supervision of the State Library, Shillong. On 16 February 2024, a unique Street Library was inaugurated by the Tura MP, Agatha K. Sangma in the Gandrak Dare Falls park. Funded by Sangma under the Members of Parliament Local Area Development Scheme (MPLADS), the aim of the Street Library is to foster the habit of reading in the people of Tura.

A District Museum was opened in Tura on 18 August 1989, under the supervision of the Williamson Sangma Museum, Shillong. The District Museum has collections that show the lifestyle and customs of the Garo people. The collections include handicrafs, objects of rituals, domestic articles, weapons, jewellery, musical instruments, costumes, etc.

== Food and drink ==
Many varieties of food available, most common is traditional Garo food. Traditional Garo food includes boiled rice, different preparations of pork, beef, chicken and dry fish. Some of the delicacies of Garo food are Na·kam Bitchi (dry fish curry made with chillies and baking soda), Galda Matchu (roselle leaves boiled with beef), Wak Gominda (pumpkin cooked with Pork, chillies and baking soda), Wak Pura (pork cooked with crushed rice or rice flour), Kappa (meat fried with baking soda and boiled with fresh garden spices), Ta·a wakgran (yam with smoked pork, chillies and baking soda), Brenga (meat cooked inside bamboo), We·tepa (meat/fish/vegetables cooked wrapped in banana leaves), Chambil Wak Pura (pomelo cooked with pork and crushed rice), Ta·a wak holdi rasin (pork cooked with yam, turmeric powder, chillies and onions), Kalai do·o (black lentils cooked with chicken), Me·a nakam (bamboo shoot with dry fish), and Me·a wak Pura (bamboo shoot with pork and rice flour).

The common sweet dishes are rice cakes called sakkin (made with locally grown sticky rice and sesame seed), pitta (made with crushed sticky rice and jaggery), and jakkep (made with sticky rice flour and sesame seeds). A variety of locally made drinks are available. Minil bitchi or Mi bitchi (Rice Beer) (made of fermented sticky rice or normal rice) is one of the most common drinks.

== Media and communications ==
All India Radio has a local station in Tura which transmits various programs of mass interest. Recently, daily local newspapers viz., The Tura Times, Janera and Salantini Ku·rang has been disseminating the information to the whole region of Garo Hills and also to parts of Assam (esp. two districts Kamrup and Goalpara) where the areas are populated with Garo People.

== Transport ==
Tura is situated in the western part of Meghalaya which is quite close to the National Border of Bangladesh. The main mode of transport is by road, as there are no railways or any scheduled flights from nearby Baljek Airport. From Guwahati, it is 220 km, through the National Highway 217(Old NH 51). Day time Sumo and overnight bus services are available from Guwahati. There is a 3-days-a-week helicopter service available from Guwahati and Shillong, run by Pawan Hans.

The nearest airport is Guwahati Airport (GAU). Although Tura has its own airport named Baljek airport situated approx. 30 km from the town but it is yet to be functional. It was inaugurated by the then President of India Smt. Pratibha Patil during her visit to the town.

== Notable people ==
- P.A. Sangma, Indian politician
- Zubeen Garg, Indian singer, actor, director, producer and music director.
- Conrad Sangma, Chief Minister of Meghalaya
