= Diphu Lok Sabha constituency =

Coordinates: 25.84°N 93.43°E

Diphu AS-6
- Lok Sabha constituency
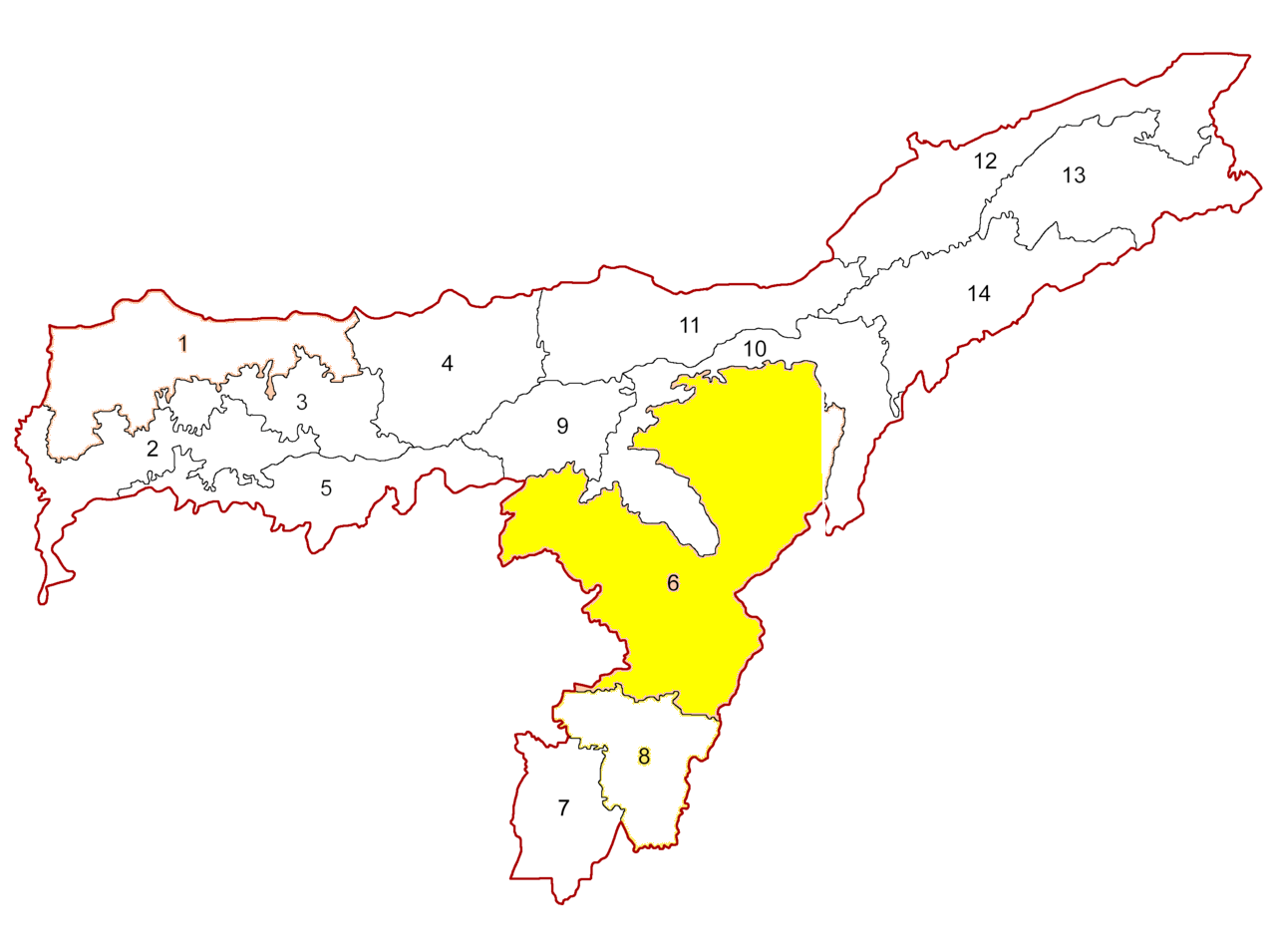
- Diphu Lok Sabha constituency 2024

Constituency details
- Country: India
- Region: Northeast India
- State: Assam
- Established: 1957
- Reservation: ST

Member of Parliament
- 18th Lok Sabha
- Incumbent Amarsing Tisso
- Party: BJP
- Alliance: NDA
- Elected year: 2024

Diphu Lok Sabha constituency is one of the 14 Lok Sabha constituencies in Assam state in north-eastern India. The seat is reserved for scheduled tribes.

The Election Commission on 2023 August 11 published its final order on the delimitation of parliamentary and Assembly constituencies in Assam.

== Assembly segments ==
Diphu Lok Sabha constituency is composed of the following assembly segments:

No.	Name	District	Member	Party	2024 Lead
108	Bokajan (ST)	Karbi Anglong	Surjya Rongphar	BJP	BJP
109	Howraghat (ST)	Karbi Anglong	Lunsing Teron	BJP	BJP
110	Diphu (ST)	Karbi Anglong	Niso Terangpi	BJP	BJP
111	Rongkhang (ST)	West Karbi Anglong	Tuliram Ronghang	BJP	BJP
112	Amri (ST)	West Karbi Anglong	Habbey Teron	BJP	BJP
113	Haflong (ST)	Dima Hasao	Rupali Langthasa	BJP	BJP

=== Former Constituencies ===
Sr.no.	Name	Reserved for (SC/ST/None)	District
1.	Baithalangso (1967−2026)	ST	West Karbi Anglong
4.	Mikir Hills West (1952−1967)	ST	West Karbi Anglong
3.	Mikir Hills East (1952−1967)	ST	Karbi Anglong
2.	North Cachar Hills (1952−1967)	ST	Dima Hasao

== Members of Parliament ==
Year	Lok Sabha	Name	Party
Autonomous District
1951–52	1st Lok Sabha	Bonily Timungpi Khongmen	Indian National Congress
1957	2nd Lok Sabha	Hoover Hynniewta	Independent
1962	3rd Lok Sabha	George Gilbert Swell	Independent
1967	4th Lok Sabha	George Gilbert Swell	Independent
1971	5th Lok Sabha	Biren Sing Engti	Indian National Congress
1977	6th Lok Sabha	Biren Sing Engti	Indian National Congress
1980	7th Lok Sabha	Elections not held in Assam	N/A
1984	8th Lok Sabha	Biren Sing Engti	Indian National Congress
1989	9th Lok Sabha	Elections not held in Assam	N/A
1991	10th Lok Sabha	Jayanta Rongpi	Communist Party of India (Marxist–Leninist) Liberation
1996	11th Lok Sabha	Jayanta Rongpi	Communist Party of India (Marxist–Leninist) Liberation
1998	12th Lok Sabha	Jayanta Rongpi	Communist Party of India (Marxist–Leninist) Liberation
1999	13th Lok Sabha	Jayanta Rongpi	Communist Party of India (Marxist–Leninist) Liberation
2004	14th Lok Sabha	Biren Sing Engti	Indian National Congress
2009	15th Lok Sabha	Biren Sing Engti	Indian National Congress
2014	16th Lok Sabha	Biren Sing Engti	Indian National Congress
2019	17th Lok Sabha	Horen Sing Bey	Bharatiya Janata Party
Constituency renamed from Autonomous District to Diphu
2024	18th Lok Sabha	Amarsing Tisso	Bharatiya Janata Party

== Election results ==
=== 2024 ===
2024 Indian general election: Diphu
Party	Candidate	Votes	%	±%
BJP	Amarsing Tisso	334,620	49.01	−12.29
IND	Jones Ingti Kathar	187,017	27.39	+20.98
INC	Joyram Engleng	124,019	18.16	−4.78
NOTA	None of the above	16,259	2.38	+1.05
GSP	John Barnard Sangma	11,279	1.65	New
ASDC	Jotson Bey	9,633	1.41	−4.57
Majority		147,603	21.62	−17.17
Turnout		687,376	76.20	−1.43
BJP hold		Swing		

=== 2019 ===
2019 Indian general elections: Autonomous District
Party	Candidate	Votes	%	±%
BJP	Horen Singh Bey	381,316	61.73	+26.96
INC	Biren Singh Engti	141,690	22.94	−16.26
Independent	Jones Ingti Kathar	39,583	6.41	New
ASDC(U)	Holiram Terang	36,915	5.98	N/A
NPP	Lienkhochon	10,037	1.62	New
NOTA	None of the above	8,194	1.33	−0.83
Majority		239,626	38.79	+34.35
Turnout		617,858	77.63	+0.20
Registered electors		795,945		
BJP gain from INC		Swing	+21.61	

=== General election 2014 ===
2014 Indian general elections: Autonomous District
Party	Candidate	Votes	%	±%
INC	Biren Singh Engti	213,152	39.20	−1.97
BJP	Joyram Engleng	189,057	34.77	+13.94
Independent	Chomang Kro	108,299	19.92	N/A
CPI(ML)L	Pratima Engheepi	11,762	2.16	−5.17
JMM	Ashweng J. Rengma	9,263	1.70	N/A
NOTA	None of the above	11,747	2.16	−−−
Majority		24,095	4.44	−11.05
Turnout		543,717	77.43	+8.03
INC hold		Swing		

=== General election 2009 ===
2009 Indian general elections: Autonomous District
Party	Candidate	Votes	%	±%
INC	Biren Singh Engti	197,835	41.11	+9.73
ASDC(U)	Elwin Teron	123,287	25.62	+0.26
BJP	Kulendra Daulagupu	100,081	20.80	+6.45
CPI(ML)L	Dr. Jayanta Rongpi	39,046	8.11	−10.43
Majority		74,548	15.49	+9.47
Turnout		480,748	69.40	−0.02
INC hold		Swing		

=== General elections 2004 ===
General Election, 2004: Autonomous District
Party	Candidate	Votes	%	±%
INC	Biren Singh Engti	125,937	31.38	
ASDC(U)	Elwin Teron	101,808	25.36	
CPI(ML)L	Dr. Jayanta Rongpi	74,399	18.54	
BJP	Ratan Teron	57,584	14.35	
Independent	Sanmoni Temprai	26,713	6.66	
Independent	Chember G. Momin	8,003	1.99	
AGP	Sailendra Hasnu	3,755	0.94	
SAP	Harsing Teron	3,178	0.79	
Majority		24,129	6.02	
Turnout		401,377	69.42	
INC gain from CPI(ML)L		Swing		

== See also ==
- List of constituencies of the Lok Sabha
