= Bormarjong =

Village in Assam, India

Bormarjong Marjong
- Village
- Location in Assam, India Bormarjong (India)
- Coordinates: 25.5730°N 92.1158°E
- Country: India
- State: Assam
- Region: Hamren
- District: West Karbi Anglong district
- Time zone: UTC+5:30 (IST)
- PIN: 782413

Bormarjong is a village in the West Karbi Anglong district of Assam State in North East India. It falls under the Amri Development Block and Vidhan Sabha No. 20 Baithalangso ST LAC.

== Geography ==
Bormarjong village extends from 25.56'37" North to 25.57'30.8" North latitude and 92.11'58.3" East to 92.12'49.7" East longitude with the average elevation of 645.5 m. The highest point of the village is about 820 m. The village is located on the western part of West Karbi Anglong district near the border between the states of Assam and Meghalaya. The village is situated at 37.7 km away from the NH 27, passing through Nellie of Morigaon district.

== Demographics ==
The total population of the village is about 1075 of which the male population is about 510 and the female population is 565. The village is dominated by the Hindu religion and 100% of the total population belong to Tiwa tribe. These people have their own language, tradition, rituals, social system etc.
