= Gobinda Chandra Langthasa =

Indian politician from the state of Assam

Minister for Hills Area Development
- In office 17 May 2001 – 21 May 2006
- Chief Minister: Tarun Gogoi

Deputy Chief Minister of Assam
- In office 30 June 1991 - 22 April 1996
- Chief Minister: Hiteswar Saikia

Cabinet Minister, Government of Assam
- In office 27 February 1983 - 24 December 1985
- Chief Minister: Hiteswar Saikia

Member of Assam Legislative Assembly
- In office 25 May 2001 - 19 May 2016
- Preceded by: Samarjit Haflongbar
- Succeeded by: Bir Bhadra Hagjer
- Constituency: Haflong
- In office 1983 - 11 June 1996
- Preceded by: Sonaram Thaosen
- Succeeded by: Samarjit Haflongbar
- Constituency: Haflong

Chief Executive Member of North Cachar Hills Autonomous Council
- In office 1972 - 1983

Executive Member of North Cachar Hills Autonomous Council
- In office 1962 - 1972
- Constituency: Gunjung

Personal details
- Born: 23 January 1932 Nutan Wadrengdisa village, Dima Hasao
- Died: 3 February 2018 (aged 86) Guwahati
- Party: Indian National Congress (1952-1983, 1985-2018)
- Other political affiliations: Independent (1983-1985)
- Spouse: Anjola Langthasa (m. 1959, died)
- Children: 7
- Parent(s): Thangrung Langthasa (Father); Kenodi Langthasa (Mother)
- Occupation: Agriculturist; Politician

Gobinda Chandra Langthasa (23 January 1932 - 3 February 2018) was an Indian politician from the state of Assam. He was a member of Assam Legislative Assembly for Haflong. He was also a cabinet minister in the first Tarun Gogoi cabinet, and Deputy Chief Minister of Assam under Hiteswar Saikia.

== Early life and education ==
Langthasa was born on 23 January 1932 between 5:00 and 6:00 A.M to the late Thangrung Langthasa and the late Kenodi Langthasa. He was born in Nutan Wadrengdisa village, Dima Hasao. Langthasa had a Graduate Standard from British Institute of England in 1955-1956.

== Political career ==
In 1952, aged 20, Langthasa joined the Indian National Congress as a worker under Maibang Block Congress Committee and he took active part for the District Council Elections, Legislative Assembly Election of the ST (Hills) Autonomous District, the then undivided Assam, comprising Khasi and Jaintia Hills, United Karbi Hills and North Cachar Hills.

Later in April 1952, Langthasa endorsed Bonily Khongmen, J.B. Hagjer and S.C. Hojai in their elections.

In 1957, Langthasa for the first time voted in the MLA and District Council Election and also supported an MP candidate.

In 1962, Langthasa was elected to the North Cachar (NC) Hills Autonomous Council from Gunjung constituency, and became Executive Member until 1967. In 1967 he was again re-elected as Member of the NC Hills Autonomous Council from the same constituency and became Executive Member until 1972. In 1972 he was elected as Chief Executive Member of N.C.Hills Autonomous Council till 1983.

In the 1983 Assam Legislative Assembly election, Langthasa stood as an independent candidate for the constituency of Haflong. He received 16313 votes, 58.03% of the total vote and became MLA of the constituency. He defeated his nearest opponent by 4513 votes. He then became a minister in the Hiteswar Saikia cabinet.

In the 1985 Assam Legislative Assembly election, Langthasa sought reelection in Haflong, however he instead received the Congress nomination for the seat. He received 29205 votes, 61.24% of the total vote and he defeated his nearest opponent by 16964 votes.

In 1991, he sought reelection. He received 33868 votes, 61.73% of the total vote and he defeated his nearest opponent by 12868 votes. He was made Deputy Chief Minister under Hiteswar Saikia.

In 1996, he lost his seat by 13671 votes.

However in 2001, he again received the congress nomination for Haflong. He received 33781 votes, 45.44% of the total vote and again became MLA. He was made HAD minister in the Tarun Gogoi cabinet.

In the 2006 Assam Legislative Assembly election, Langthasa sought reelection. He received 40154 votes, defeating his nearest opponent by 7818 votes. He was appointed pro tempore speaker of the Assembly by Governor Ajai Singh. He was not inducted into the second Tarun Gogoi cabinet but he was appointed the Chairman of Assam State Transport Corporation (ASTC) and member of Gauhati University Court & Council.

In the 2011 Assam Legislative Assembly election, he sought reelection. He received 38076 votes, 57.04% of the total vote, defeating his nearest opponent by 25488 votes. He did not seek reelection in the 2016 Assam Legislative Assembly election and his son, Nirmal Langthasa, was the congress candidate but lost.

== Personal life ==
Langthasa married Anjola Langthasa on 13 March 1959. They had 5 sons and two daughters. His wife predeceased him. In 2003, Langthasa's 4th youngest son was killed at Haflong by militants and in the following year, 2004, his youngest son Nirmal Langthasa was kidnapped by the ULFA and was held captive for a period of four months when he was Assam's HAD Minister. In June 2007, Langthasa's eldest son Purnendu Lagthasa, the then Chief Executive Member of NCHAC was killed by the militants while he was on election campaigning at Langlai Hasnu Village, Dehangi. Another of his sons predeceased him, dying of natural causes.

According to Langthasa's profile at the state legislature, he enjoyed playing football, swimming and drama/dancing. He also had a special interest in reading history books, ancient records and the lives and history of great people.

== Death and funeral ==
In January 2018, Langthasa suffered a cerebral stroke and was admitted to hospital. Langthasa died at Down Town hospital in Guwahati around 1:30 am on 3 February 2018, aged 86. He was survived by 2 sons and 2 daughters. His body was received at different places of the district right from Manderdisa, Hatikhali, Langting, Kalachand, Maibang and Mahur. Most of the people were Congress leaders and party members who offered floral tribute to their leader. The last rites of Langthasa were performed after a procession was taken out on the streets of Haflong in his honour. Congress MP Biren Sing Engti, Congress leaders Nalendra Karigapsa, Birat Langthasa and former EM Bimal Hoja participated in the funeral procession. While hundreds of people joined the procession, representatives of several parties and organizations paid their last tributes. His body was cremated at Haflong Town Swasan Ghat after the procession in Haflong.

== Positions ==
- 1962: Member, North Cachar Hills Autonomous Council
- 1967: Member, North Cachar Hills Autonomous Council
- 1972: Chief Executive Member, North Cachar Hills Autonomous Council
- 1983: Member, Assam Legislative Assembly
- 1983: Cabinet Minister, Government of Assam
- 1985: Member, Assam Legislative Assembly
- 1987: President, Dima Hasao District Congress Committee
- 1991: Member, Assam Legislative Assembly
- 1991: Deputy Chief Minister, Government of Assam
- 2001: Member, Assam Legislative Assembly
- 2001: HAD minister, Government of Assam
- 2006: Member, Assam Legislative Assembly
- 2006: Chairman, Assam State Transport Corporation
- 2006: Member, Gauhati University Court & Council.
- 2011: Member, Assam Legislative Assembly
