= Rongpi =

Rongpi is a surname. Notable people with the surname include:

- Jayanta Rongpi (born 1955), Indian politician
- Mansing Rongpi, Indian politician
