= Diphu Assembly constituency =

Constituency of the Assam legislative assembly in India

Diphu
- Constituency No. 110 for the Assam Legislative Assembly

Constituency details
- Country: India
- Region: Northeast India
- State: Assam
- District: Karbi Anglong
- Lok Sabha constituency: Diphu
- Established: 1978
- Reservation: ST

Member of Legislative Assembly
- 16th Assam Legislative Assembly
- Incumbent Niso Terangpi
- Party: BJP
- Alliance: NDA
- Elected year: 2026

Diphu is one of the 126 constituencies of the Assam Legislative Assembly in India. Diphu forms a part of the Diphu Lok Sabha constituency. This seat is reserved for the Scheduled Tribes (ST).

== Details ==
Following are details on Diphu Assembly constituency:

- Country: India.
- State: Assam.
- District: Karbi Anglong district.
- Lok Sabha Constituency: Diphu Lok Sabha constituency.
- Area Includes: Lumbajong Dev. Block, Langsomepi Dev. Block, Diphu MB, Manja TC, Borlangpher TC, Dhansiri TC, Bakulia MB, Phuloni Center TC.

== Members of Legislative Assembly ==
Following is the list of past members representing Diphu Assembly constituency in Assam Legislature.

Year	Winner	Party
1978	Gandhi Ram Timung	Janata Party
1983	Kaizasong	Independent politician
1985	Samsing Hanse	Independent politician
1991	Dipendra Rongpi	Autonomous State Demand Committee
1996	Hemsing Tisso	Autonomous State Demand Committee
2001	Bidya Sing Engleng	Indian National Congress
2006	Bidya Sing Engleng	Indian National Congress
2011	Bidya Sing Engleng	Indian National Congress
2016	Sum Ronghang	Bharatiya Janata Party
2021	Bidya Sing Engleng	Bharatiya Janata Party
2026	Niso Terangpi	Bharatiya Janata Party

== Election Results ==
=== 2026 ===
2026 Assam Legislative Assembly election: Diphu
Party	Candidate	Votes	%	±%
BJP	Niso Terangpi	33,591	66.12	
Independent	J. I. Kathar	13,657	26.88	
Independent	Rajen Timung S/O Lt. Kangbura Timung	1,269	2.50	
AAP	Biresh Difoesa	743	1.46	
NOTA	None of the above	945	1.86	
Independent	Rajen Timung S/O Lt. Sarthe Timung	299	0.59	
Independent	Rabindra Rongpi	297	0.58	
Majority		19,934	39.24	
Turnout		50,801		
Registered electors				
BJP hold		Swing		

=== 2021 ===
2021 Assam Legislative Assembly election: Diphu
Party	Candidate	Votes	%	±%
BJP	Bidyasing Engleng	77,032	50.58	+3.99
INC	Sum Ronghang	36,504	23.97	−2.2
Independent	Jones Ingti Kathar	23,356	15.34	N/A
ASDC(U)	Hemsing Tisso	7,379	4.85	N/A
Independent	Rajen Timung	1372	N/A	N/A
Independent	Rajit Kramsa	1467	N/A	N/A
NOTA	None of the above	2,320	1.52	−0.5
Majority		40,528	26.61	+6.19
Turnout		1,52,294		
Registered electors				
BJP hold		Swing		

=== 2016 ===
2016 Assam Legislative Assembly election: Diphu
Party	Candidate	Votes	%	±%
BJP	Sum Ronghang	64,421	46.59	+35.72
INC	Bidyasing Engleng	36,185	26.17	−19.81
Independent	Jayanta Rongpi	31,647	22.88	N/A
LJP	Dipendra Rongpi	1,975	1.42	N/A
JCP	Mary Kramsapi	1,231	0.89	N/A
NOTA	None of the above	2,803	2.02	N/A
Majority		28,236	20.42	+9.81
Turnout		1,38,262	80.50	+8.33
Registered electors		1,71,751		
BJP gain from INC		Swing		

=== 2011 ===
2011 Assam Legislative Assembly election: Diphu
Party	Candidate	Votes	%	±%
INC	Bidyasing Engleng	54,022	45.98	
Independent	George Millick	41,551	35.37	
BJP	Padma Malbangsa	12,773	10.87	
Independent	J. I. Kathar	9,135	7.78	
Majority		12,471	10.61	
Turnout		1,17,481	72.17	
Registered electors		1,62,783		
INC hold		Swing		

== See also ==
- Diphu
- Diphu Lok Sabha constituency
- Karbi Anglong district
