= Autonomous State Demand Committee =

- Chairman: Jayanta Rongpi
- Lok Sabha Leader: Jayanta Rongpi
- Headquarters: Rongnihang, Diphu, Karbi Anglong
- Ideology: Communism; Marxism–Leninism; Mao Zedong Thought
- Political position: Far-left
- Colours
- ECI Status: Unrecognised State Party
- Seats in Rajya Sabha: 0 / 245
- Seats in Lok Sabha: 0 / 543
- Seats in State Legislative Assembly: 0 / 126 (Assam)

Autonomous State Demand Committee (ASDC), originally Peoples Democratic Front, was set up as a mass organization of the Communist Party of India (Marxist-Leninist) Liberation with the aim of statehood for the Karbi Anglong region in the Indian state of Assam.

ASDC was active in the districts of Karbi Anglong and Dima Hasao (North Chachar Hills). Several elections to the Lok Sabha and the District Council were won under the ASDC banner. Dr. Jayanta Rongpi represented the area in the Lok Sabha, elected as the ASDC candidate in 1991, 1996 and 1998. Later, ASDC split into two, with one section the Autonomous State Demand Committee (United) breaking away from CPI(ML) Liberation and aligning with the Bharatiya Janata Party.

The main group loyal to CPI(ML) Liberation reorganized themselves as Autonomous State Demand Committee (Progressive). From 1999 election onwards, Autonomous State Demand Committee (Progressive) candidates contest election on the banner of Communist Party of India (Marxist-Leninist) Liberation.

In 2015, a group of former leaders from the Autonomous State Demand Committee (ASDC) established a new political party known as the Hills State Demand Council (HSDC). The HSDC's primary objective was to continue ASDC's advocacy for the creation of a separate state for the hill districts of Assam. The new party sought to pursue this goal with a transformed dynamism.

== Members of Lok Sabha ==
Members of Arunachal Pradesh Legislative Assembly
Year	Lok Sabha	Name	Constituency	Margin
1991 Indian general election	10th Lok Sabha	Jayanta Rongpi	Autonomous District Lok Sabha constituency	57,781
1996 Indian general election	11th Lok Sabha	Jayanta Rongpi	Autonomous District Lok Sabha constituency	1,03,130
1998 Indian general election	12th Lok Sabha	Jayanta Rongpi	Autonomous District Lok Sabha constituency	1,04,864

== Members of Rajya Sabha ==
Members of Rajya Sabha
Year	Sr. no.	Name	State	Term	Period
1996 Rajya Sabha elections	1.	Prakanta Warisa	List of Rajya Sabha members from Assam	10 April 1996-9 April 2002	6 years

== Members of Legislative Assembly ==
Members of Assam Legislative Assembly
Year	Sr. no.	Name	Constituency	Margin
1991 Assam Legislative Assembly election	1.	Mansing Rongpi	Bokajan	
1991 Assam Legislative Assembly election	2.	Babu Rongpi	Howraghat	
1991 Assam Legislative Assembly election	3.	Dipendra Rongpi	Diphu	
1991 Assam Legislative Assembly election	4.	Holiram Terang	Baithalangso	

Members of Assam Legislative Assembly
Year	Sr. no.	Name	Constituency	Margin
1996 Assam Legislative Assembly election	1.	Jagat Sing Engti	Bokajan	
1996 Assam Legislative Assembly election	2.	Chandra Kanta Terang	Howraghat	
1996 Assam Legislative Assembly election	3.	Samarjit Haflongbar	Haflong	
1996 Assam Legislative Assembly election	4.	Hemsing Tisso	Diphu	
1996 Assam Legislative Assembly election	5.	Holiram Terang	Baithalangso	

Members of Assam Legislative Assembly
Year	Sr. no.	Name	Constituency	Margin
2001 Assam Legislative Assembly election	1.	Jagat Sing Engti	Bokajan	
2001 Assam Legislative Assembly election	2.	Dharamsing Teron	Howraghat	

Members of Assam Legislative Assembly
Year	Sr. no.	Name	Constituency	Margin
2006 Assam Legislative Assembly election	1.	Jagat Sing Engti	Bokajan	

== See also ==
- CPI(ML) Liberation
- Indian People's Front
- Lal Sena
