= The Arleng Daily =

- Type: Daily newspaper
- Format: Tabloid
- Founded: June 2004
- Language: Karbi
- Headquarters: Diphu, Karbi Anglong, Assam
- City: Diphu
- Country: India
- Circulation: 22,184
- RNI: ASSKAR/2005/21216

The Arleng Daily is a Karbi daily newspaper published from Diphu, Assam. It has its beginning in June 2004. Initially its publication was distributed for free in and around Diphu, (mostly in Diphu Government College). As of 2008, it was one of the only two Karbi language dailies in Karbi Anglong district.

== History ==
The Arleng Daily is the first daily newspaper to be published in Karbi language in modern-day (after India Independence) and second after the now closed 'Birta' (1903), after a gap of 101 year. The Arleng Daily is notable for starting a new trend in newspaper publishing in Karbi Anglong (in different languages). This step was soon followed by Thekar and others. Since then there has been dozen of newspaper that came to public attention.

== See also ==
- Thekar
- The Hills Times (Diphu)
