= Thekar =

Thekar Arnivang
- Type: Daily newspaper
- Format: Tabloid
- Owner: Longsing Teron
- Publisher: Longsing Teron
- Editor-in-chief: Longsing Teron
- Editor: Klangklir Teron
- Founded: 2004; 21 years ago
- Language: Karbi
- Headquarters: Diphu, Assam
- City: Diphu
- Country: India
- Circulation: 23,980
- Price: 5
- Sister newspapers: The Hills Review
- RNI: ASSKAR/2005/21230

Thekar is a Karbi daily newspaper published from Diphu, Assam. It is the highest circulated Karbi daily in North East India. As of 2008, it was one of the only two Karbi-language dailies in Karbi Anglong district, The Thekar has wide reach among the people in terms of circulation figures as well as the reliability of the news matter.

As of November 2024, Longsing Teron is the Chief Editor, and Klangklir Teron is the Editor.

== History ==
The newspaper was founded with the name Angtong in the year 2004, as a weekly newspaper, but due to the opposition of the title by activist group, Karbi Youth Organisation (KYO), the name was changed to Thekar. It started as a weekly, then biweekly and later into triweekly. It became a daily newspaper on 21 September 2005. The publication later expanded with an English daily "The Hills Review" and a cable TV "KAT Channel".

== Contribution to Karbi language ==
Before the advent of Karbi dailies in the early 2000s, there were little research on Karbi language. Karbi dailies contributed immensely to the research and development, and spread of the same. The media group (newspaper) has become the platform for improving written Karbi language, as the language has no written form. Many young writers are involved in improving the language by setting rules and coining new words through research, open discussion, etc.

== Sister publication ==
The Hills Review is its sister daily newspaper published in English language from Diphu. Its current editor is Longsing Teron. The media group also has KAT Channel, a cable TV channel in and around Diphu town.

== See also ==
- The Arleng Daily
- The Hills Times (Diphu)
