= Umswai =

- Village
- Location in Assam, India Umswai (India)
- Coordinates: 25.9472°N 92.2404°E
- Country: India
- State: Assam
- Region: Hamren
- District: West Karbi Anglong district

Languages
  - Official: English and Assamese
  - Spoken: Tiwa, Karbi, Khasi, English and Hindi
- Time zone: UTC+5:30 (IST)
- PIN: 782410

Umswai is a village in Amri development block of West Karbi Anglong district in the Indian state of Assam. Apart from being home to an exclusive tribal culture, Umswai also possesses extraordinary natural beauty.

== Etymology ==
The word Umswai is originated from the language of Khasi People. This also resulted in the term 'Umswai' being officially recognized by the Assam government.

== Geography ==
Umswai is located state of Assam in Northeast India. It is one of the many villages in the Umswai valley, and is mainly inhabited by the indigenous Tiwa tribe.

== Educational institutions ==
- Don Bosco Higher Secondary School, Umswai
- Green Valley Academy, Umswai
- Umswai English High School, Umswai
- Umswai ME School, Umswai
