= List of educational institutions in Shillong =

This is a list of education institutions in Shillong, India.

== Institutes ==
- The National Law University of Meghalaya
- English and Foreign Languages University
- Indian Institute of Management Shillong
- Indian Institute of Professional Studies
- Martin Luther Christian University
- National Institute of Fashion Technology Shillong
- National Institute of Technology Meghalaya
- North Eastern Hill University
- North Eastern Indira Gandhi Regional Institute of Health and Medical Sciences
- NICT Computer Education
- Techno Global University
- University of Technology and Management
- Shillong Medical College

Sources: English and Foreign Languages University; North Eastern Hill University

== General degree colleges ==
- KL Bajoria College
- Lady Keane College
- Shillong Law College
- St. Mary's College
- Shillong College
- Shillong Commerce College
- Shillong Polytechnic
- St. Anthony's College
- St. Dominic College
- St. Edmund's College
- Synod College

== Other important schools and colleges ==
- BSF Senior Secondary School, Umpling
- Don Bosco Technical School
- Seven Set Higher Secondary School
- St. Anthony’s Higher Secondary School
- St. Edmund's School
- Pine Mount School
