= Rupsing Teron =

Indian politician

Member of Assam Legislative Assembly
- Incumbent
- Assumed office 21 May 2021
- Preceded by: Mansing Rongpi
- Constituency: Baithalangso

Personal details
- Party: Bharatiya Janata Party
- Profession: Politician

Rupsing Teron (born 1967) is an Indian politician from Assam. He is an MLA from Baithalangso constituency representing Bharatiya Janata Party.

== Early life and education ==
Teron is from Umrenti, Hamren, West Karbi Anglong District, Assam. He is the son of late Harber Teron. He married Basapi Terongpi, and they have six children, two sons and four daughters.

== Career ==
Teron became a first time MLA, winning the 2021 Assam Legislative Assembly election representing Bharatiya Janata Party. He polled 89,715 votes and defeated the nearest rival, Augustine Enghee of the Indian National Congress, by a margin of 53,437 votes.
