= Artukekang =

- Village
- Location in Karbi Anglong, Assam, India Artukekang (India)
- Coordinates: 25°56′21.098″N 92°43′1.518″E
- Country: India
- State: Assam
- District: West Karbi Anglong

Government
  - Body: Dongkamukam Town Committee

Languages
  - Official: English, Karbi
- Time zone: UTC+5:30 (IST)
- PIN: 782485

Artukekang is a place situated in Dongkamukam town, in West Karbi Anglong district of Assam, India.

== Etymology ==
Artukekang comes from the Karbi words, which is a portmanteau of two Karbi word Artu and Kekang, meaning Forest covered and "of sacred place" respectively.

== Location ==
- Latitude: 25.93826778
- Longitude: 92.93826778
- Sea level: 76 m

== Institutions and schools ==
- Artukekang English High School

== Ponds and lakes ==
- Ronghem Alank tenk
- Pahok hem alank tenk

== Playground ==
- Artukekang Playground

== Cafe ==
- Engti's Cafe

== Parks and gardens ==
- Ove-Nokjir abiri, N.D garden
