= Niso Terangpi =

Indian politician (born 1980)

Assam Legislative Assembly
- Incumbent
- Assumed office 4 may 2026
- Preceded by: Bidya Sing Engleng
- Constituency: Diphu Assembly constituency

Personal details
- Born: 1980 (age 45–46)
- Party: Bharatiya Janata Party
- Profession: Politician

Niso Terangpi (born 1980) is an Indian politician from Assam. She is a Member of the Legislative Assembly from Diphu Assembly constituency which is reserved for Scheduled Tribe community in Karbi Anglong district representing the Bharatiya Janata Party.

Terangpi is from Diphu, Karbi Anglong district, Assam. She married Buddho Teron. She completed her B.Sc. in 2004 at Diphu Government College which is affiliated with Assam University.

She became an MLA winning the 2026 Assam Legislative Assembly election from Diphu Assembly constituency representing the Bharatiya Janata Party. She polled 90,866 votes and defeated her nearest rival, J. I. Kathar, an independent candidate, by a margin of 49,740 votes.
