= AJZ =

AJZ or ajz may refer to:

- Australian Journal of Zoology, an international peer-reviewed scientific journal published by CSIRO Publishing
- Amri language, Assam and Meghalaya (ISO 639-3 code "ajz")
- Andreas John Ziegler, an American wrestler
