= Rongkhang Assembly constituency =

Assembly constituency of Assam

Rongkhang
- Constituency No. 111 for the Assam Legislative Assembly

Constituency details
- Country: India
- Region: Northeast India
- State: Assam
- District: West Karbi Anglong
- Lok Sabha constituency: Diphu
- Established: 2023
- Reservation: ST

Member of Legislative Assembly
- 16th Assam Legislative Assembly
- Incumbent Tuliram Ronghang
- Party: BJP
- Alliance: NDA
- Elected year: 2026

Rongkhang Assembly constituency is one of the 126 assembly constituencies of Assam a north east state of India. It was newly formed in 2023.

== Members of Legislative Assembly ==
Year	Winner	Party
2026	Tuliram Ronghang	Bharatiya Janata Party

== Election Results ==
=== 2026 ===
2026 Assam Legislative Assembly election: Rongkhang
Party	Candidate	Votes	%	±%
BJP	Tuliram Ronghang	69,413	75.39	
INC	Augustine Enghee	20,122	21.85	
Independent	Wilson Terang	1,090	1.18	
CPI(ML)L	Pratima Engheepi	990	1.07	
NOTA	None of the above	986	1.07	
Majority		49,291	53.54	
Turnout		92,601		
Registered electors				
BJP hold		Swing		

== See also ==
- West Karbi Anglong district
- List of constituencies of Assam Legislative Assembly
