= Bokajan Assembly constituency =

Constituency of the Assam legislative assembly in India

Bokajan
- Constituency No. 108 for the Assam Legislative Assembly

Constituency details
- Country: India
- Region: Northeast India
- State: Assam
- District: Karbi Anglong
- Lok Sabha constituency: Diphu
- Established: 1967
- Reservation: ST

Member of Legislative Assembly
- 16th Assam Legislative Assembly
- Incumbent Surjya Rongphar
- Party: Bharatiya Janata Party
- Alliance: National Democratic Alliance

Bokajan Assembly constituency is one of the 126 constituencies of the Assam Legislative Assembly in India. Bokajan forms a part of the Diphu Lok Sabha constituency. This seat is reserved for the Scheduled Tribes (ST).

== Details ==
Following are details on Bokajan Assembly constituency:

- Country: India.
- State: Assam.
- District: Karbi Anglong district .
- Lok Sabha Constituency: Diphu Lok Sabha constituency
- Area Includes: Bokajan Dev. Block, Nilip Dev. Block, Chowkihola TC, Deithor TC, Bokajan MB.

== Members of Legislative Assembly ==
Following is the list of past members representing Biswanath Assembly constituency in Assam Legislature.

== Members of Legislative Assembly ==
Year	Winner	Party
1967	S. S. Terang	Indian National Congress
1972	S. S. Terang	Indian National Congress
1978	Bilton Momin	Janata Party
1983	Rajen Timung	Indian National Congress
1985	Rajen Timung	Indian National Congress
1991	Mansing Rongpi	Autonomous State Demand Committee
1996	Jagat Sing Engti	Autonomous State Demand Committee
2001	Jagat Sing Engti	Autonomous State Demand Committee
2006	Jagat Sing Engti	Autonomous State Demand Committee
2011	Klengdoon Engti	Indian National Congress
2016	Numal Momin	Bharatiya Janata Party
2021	Numal Momin	Bharatiya Janata Party
2026	Surjya Rongphar	Bharatiya Janata Party

== Election results ==
=== 2026 ===
2026 Assam Legislative Assembly election: Bokajan
Party	Candidate	Votes	%	±%
BJP	Surjya Rongphar	69851	54.48	
INC	Raton Engti	52385	40.86	
Independent	Raju Rongpi	1521	1.19	
AAP	Renuka Timungpi	1500	1.17	
Independent	Samuel Rongpi Ejang	1076	0.84	
ASDC	~~Kamal Singh Bey~~ [candidature rejected]			
JMM	~~Pratap Sing Rongphar~~ [candidature rejected]			
NOTA	NOTA	1886	1.47	
Margin of victory		17466		
Turnout		128219		
Rejected ballots				
Registered electors				
gain from		Swing		

=== 2021 ===
2021 Assam Legislative Assembly election: Bokajan
Party	Candidate	Votes	%	±%
BJP	Numal Momin	60,726	51.05	+13.57
INC	Raton Engti	42,841	36.02	+2.96
Independent	Semson Teron	6,630	5.57	
ASDC(U)	Rajendra Rongpi	3,410	2.87	N/A
CPI(ML)L	Amlong Ingti	1,572	1.32	N/A
NPP	Daniel Momin	1,472	1.24	−0.27
BTP	Sanjay Kemprai	710	0.6	N/A
NOTA	None of the above	1,584	1.33	−0.67
Majority		17,885	15.03	+10.61
Turnout		1,18,945		
Registered electors				
BJP hold		Swing		

=== 2016 ===
2016 Assam Legislative Assembly election: Bokajan
Party	Candidate	Votes	%	±%
BJP	Numal Momin	40,170	37.48	+32.15
INC	Klengdoon Engti	35,426	33.06	−20.95
Independent	Jagat Sing Engti	25,388	23.69	−13.30
NPP	Daniel Momin	1,628	1.51	N/A
Independent	Sanjay Kemprai	1,441	1.34	N/A
JCP	Bikha Tokbi	959	0.89	N/A
NOTA	None of the above	2,144	2.00	N/A
Majority		4,744	4.42	−12.60
Turnout		1,07,156	82.63	+6.96
Registered electors		1,29,677		
BJP gain from INC		Swing		

=== 2011 ===
2011 Assam Legislative Assembly election: Bokajan
Party	Candidate	Votes	%	±%
INC	Klengdoon Engti	53,332	54.01	
Independent	Jagat Sing Engti	36,524	36.99	
BJP	Sandhya Rani Sangma	5,259	5.33	
AGP	Baburam Bey	2,226	2.25	
AITC	Chandra Sing Rongpi	1,411	1.43	
Majority		16,808	17.02	
Turnout		98,752	75.67	
Registered electors		1,30,498		
INC gain from ASDC		Swing		

== See also ==
- Bokajan
- Diphu Lok Sabha constituency
- Karbi Anglong district
