= Dongkamukam =

- Town
- Nickname: Dongka
- Location in Karbi Anglong, Assam, India Dongkamukam (India)
- Coordinates: 25°55′58.105″N 92°42′5.089″E
- Country: India
- State: Assam
- District: West Karbi Anglong

Government
  - Body: Dongkamukam Municipal Board

Population (2001)
  - Total: 8,144

Languages
  - Official: English, Assamese and Hindi
  - Regional: Karbi and Hindi

Languages
- Time zone: UTC+5:30 (IST)
- PIN: 782485
- Vehicle registration: AS-09

Dongkamukam (IPA: ˌdɒŋəˈməʊkəm ) is a town and a town area committee in West Karbi Anglong district in the state of Assam, India.

== Etymology ==
Dong in the Karbi language mean shallow water or river. Kam means step(verb)/crossing. Donkamukam can be translated as "to cross the shallow water".

== Demographics ==
Demographically, around 95% of the population living in Dongkamukam town belongs to the Karbi tribe. The majority of non-Karbi settlers in the area have come for business purposes and have rented houses or leased land. Most Karbis living in the area practice a form of Animism, while a small portion of the population have embraced Christianity. They mainly reside in the villages of Bordongka, Taralangso, Sojong, Ghilani, and Dongkasarpo. While a majority of the population belongs to the Karbi speaking community, a small percentage of the population belongs to the Bengali, Manipuri, Assamese and Bihari speaking community.

There is a Municipal Board headed by the Chairman to look after the all-round development of the town. For better administration, the town is divided into five wards; each headed by a commissioner. Near the main junction, there is a park named after Late Khorsing Bey that is dedicated to recreational and sports activities for children. The town also has an indoor stadium for badminton and table tennis, a football stadium for football players, and a well-equipped gym for health lovers.

== Economy ==
Dongkamukam is one of the most important towns in West Karbi Anglong. It provides facilities like good schools, colleges, jobs, etc. and is a place of tourist attraction. People from different parts of Karbi Anglong and West Karbi Anglong come to Dongkamukam for a variety of reasons, including employment, education, and business opportunities as Dongkamukam is the only town in West Karbi Anglong which is in a plain area and has the necessary facilities and infrastructure. It is an important town of West Karbi Anglong and it connects important towns like Hamren, Baithalangso, Kheroni, Zirikindeng, etc.

== Education ==
=== Schools and colleges ===
Dongkamukam is listed as one of the best places for quality educational facilities in West Karbi Anglong. The schools and colleges of Dongkamukam also provides a wide range of facilities like Computers, Library, Campuses, playground etc.

Some of the major Schools and Colleges are:

1. Artukekang English High School
2. Don Bosco Higher Secondary School, Sojong
3. Dongkamukam High School, Charali
4. Habe-Kong English High School, Langhan
5. Holy Child Home Academy, Ghilani
6. Langtuk Teron Memorial School, Tengkeralangso
7. Rangsina College
8. Sing Mirjeng Long Mirjeng Academy, Daily Bazaar
9. Voso Koida English School, Phankri Arong
10. Sar-ik Terang Memorial School, Charali
11. Dongka Sarpo Junior College, Langsudo

== Sports ==
=== Stadium ===
- Waisong Stadium (Affiliated to Karbi Anglong Sports Association)
- Artukekang Playground
- Rongbin FC Playground, Langhan
- Langsudo Playground
- DBHS School Playground, Sojong

=== Sports Club ===
Under West Karbi Anglong Sports Association

- Artukekang 4H Club
- Waisong Club
- Rongbin FC, Langhan
- Lightning Club
- Hell Angels

== Medical & Hospital ==
- 30 bedded Rural Hospital
