= Borpu =

Village in Karbi Anglong, Assam, India

- Village
- Location within India
- Coordinates: 25°55′7.61″N 92°34′26.48″E
- Country: India
- State: Assam
- District: Karbi Anglong
- Tehsil: Donka

Area
  - Total: 1.046 km^{2} (0.404 sq mi)

Population (2011)
  - Total: 403
- Postal code: 782450

Borpu is a village in Donka Tehsil, Karbi Anglong district in the Indian state of Assam. It had a population of 403 people (2011 Census) in a total of 77 houses. Of these inhabitants, 200 were males, 203 females. There were 69 children.

The nearest town to Borpu is Hamren, which is located 12 kilometres (7.5 mi). The village's area is 104.56 hectares (1.0456 km^{2})
