= Habbey Teron =

Indian politician (born 1975)

Deputy Speaker of the Assam Legislative Assembly
- Incumbent
- Assumed office 21 June 2026
- Speaker: Ranjeet Kumar Dass
- Chief Minister: Himanta Biswa Sarma
- Preceded by: Numal Momin

Member of Assam Legislative Assembly
- Incumbent
- Assumed office 4 May 2026
- Constituency: Amri (ST)

Personal details
- Born: 1973 (age 52–53)
- Party: Bharatiya Janata Party
- Occupation: Politician

Habbey Teron (born 1975) is an Indian politician from Assam. He is a member of the Assam Legislative Assembly from the Amri Assembly constituency which is reserved for Scheduled Tribe community in West Karbi Anglong district representing the Bharatiya Janata Party. From July 2026, he is serving as the Deputy Speaker of Assam Legislative Assembly.

== Early life and education ==
Teron is from Amri, West Karbi Anglong district, Assam. He is the son of Lindok Teron, who served the armed forces. He completed his MBBS at Assam Medical College, Dibrugarh in 2008. He is working as a Senior Medical and Health Officer, Kheroni Model Hospital, West Karbi. His wife is the Joint Director of Health Services, Diphu, Karbi Anglong. He declared assets worth Rs.2 crore in his affidavit to the Election Commission of India.

== Career ==
Teron won the Amri Assembly constituency representing the Bharatiya Janata Party in the 2026 Assam Legislative Assembly election. He polled 50,273 votes and defeated his nearest rival, Bikram Hanse, an independent candidate, by a margin of 23,910 votes.
