= Tuliram Ronghang =

Indian politician (born 1973)

Assam Legislative Assembly
- Incumbent
- Assumed office 4 May 2026
- Constituency: Rongkhang Assembly constituency

Personal details
- Born: 1973 (age 52–53) assam,India
- Party: Bharatiya Janata Party
- Profession: Politician

Tuliram Ronghang (born 1973) is an Indian politician from Assam. He is a member of the Assam Legislative Assembly from the Rongkhang Assembly constituency, which is reserved for Scheduled Tribe community, in West Karbi Anglong district representing the Bharatiya Janata Party.

== Early life and education ==
Ronghang is from Rongkhang, West Karbi Anglong district, Assam. He is the son of Joysingh Ronghang. He completed his B.Com. at Gauhati Commerce College, Uner, Gauhati University In 1995. He served as chief executive member of the Kabri Anglong Autonomous Council, Diphu, Karbi Anglong. His wife is a government employee in the irrigation department. He declared assets worth Rs.13 crore in his affidavit to the Election Commission of India.

== Career ==
Ronghang won the Rongkhang Assembly constituency representing the Bharatiya Janata Party in the 2026 Assam Legislative Assembly election. He polled 83,248 votes and defeated his nearest rival, Augustine Enghee of the Indian National Congress, by a margin of 60,243 votes.
