= The Hills Times =

English-language newspaper in Assam, India

- Voice of The Hills People
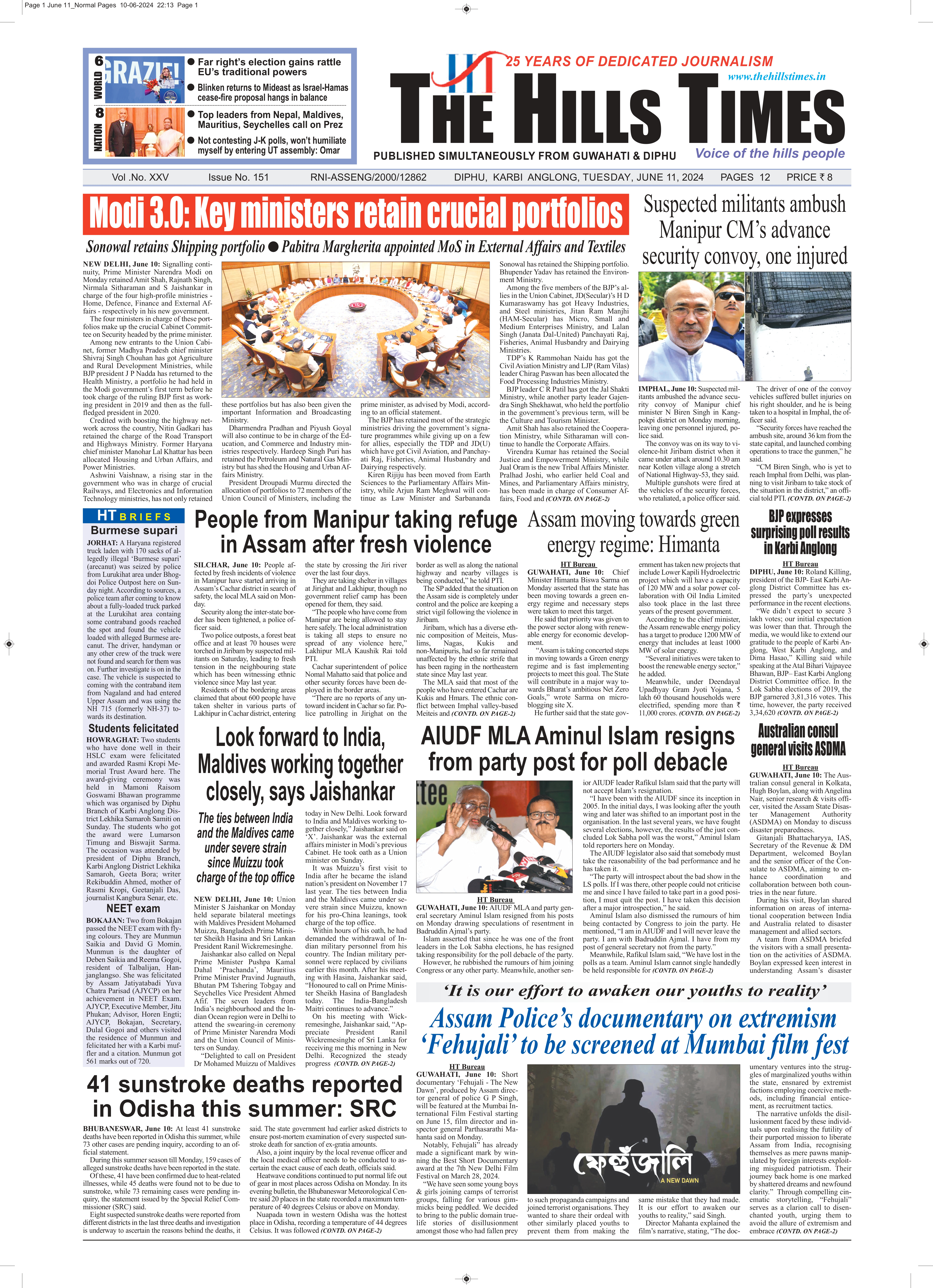
- Type: Daily newspaper
- Format: Broadsheet
- Owner: Rameswar Chauhan
- Publisher: Rameswar Chauhan
- Editor: Rameswar Chauhan
- Founded: 2000
- Language: English
- Headquarters: Diphu, Karbi Anglong, Assam
- City: Diphu
- Country: India
- Circulation: 31,000+
- RNI: ASSENG/2000/12862
- Website: www.thehillstimes.in

The Hills Times is a daily newspaper in English published in Diphu, in Karbi Anglong district, and Guwahati, the capital of Assam. It started publication in 2000.

The current editor of The Hills Times is Rameswar Chauhan.

== See also ==
- Thekar
- The Arleng Daily
