= Amri Assembly constituency =

Assembly constituency of Assam

Amri
- Constituency No. 112 for the Assam Legislative Assembly

Constituency details
- Country: India
- Region: Northeast India
- State: Assam
- District: West Karbi Anglong
- Lok Sabha constituency: Diphu
- Established: 2023
- Reservation: ST

Member of Legislative Assembly
- 16th Assam Legislative Assembly
- Incumbent Habbey Teron
- Party: BJP
- Alliance: NDA
- Elected year: 2026

Amri Assembly constituency is one of the 126 assembly constituencies of Assam a north east state of India. It was newly formed in 2023.

== Election Results ==
=== 2026 ===
2026 Assam Legislative Assembly election: Amri
Party	Candidate	Votes	%	±%
BJP	Habbey Teron	50,273	63.29	
Independent	Bikram Hanse	26,363	33.20	
Independent	Wilson Terang	972	1.22	
NOTA	None of the above	1,829	2.30	
Majority		23,910	30.09	
Turnout		79,437		
Registered electors				
BJP hold		Swing		

== See also ==
- West Karbi Anglong district
- List of constituencies of Assam Legislative Assembly
