= Baithalangso =

Place in Assam, India

- Location in Assam
- Coordinates: 25.967°N 92.594°E
- Country: India
- State: India
- District: West Karbi Anglong district

Population (2011)
  - Total: 1,987

Languages
  - Official: Karbi, Assamese

Baithalangso is a village in the West Karbi Anglong district of Assam, India.

== See also ==
- West Karbi Anglong district
- Baithalangso (Vidhan Sabha constituency)
