= Hagjer =

Hagjer or Hagjersa is a Dimasa language surname meaning "intermediary". Notable people with this name include:

- Bir Bhadra Hagjer
- Joy Bhadra Hagjer
