= Sum Ronghang =

Indian politician (1962/1963–2024)

Cabinet Minister, Assam
- In office 26 April 2018 – 7 March 2021
- Chief Minister: Sarbananda Sonowal
- Departments: Mines and Minerals; Hill Areas Development
- Preceded by: Pramila Rani Brahma (Mines); Sarbananda Sonowal (HAD)
- Succeeded by: Jogen Mohan

Member, Assam Legislative Assembly
- In office 2016–2021
- Preceded by: Bidya Sing Engleng
- Succeeded by: Bidya Sing Engleng
- Constituency: Diphu (ST)

Chief Executive Officer of Karbi Anglong Autonomous Council
- In office 3 June 2006 – 21 December 2006
- Preceded by: Jayanta Rongpi
- Succeeded by: Tuliram Ronghang

Personal details
- Born: 1962/1963
- Died: 3 May 2024 (aged 61) Khanapara, Guwahati, Assam, India
- Party: Indian National Congress (since 2021)
- Other political affiliations: Bharatiya Janata Party (until 2021)
- Profession: Cultivator, Social Worker

Sum Ronghang (1962/1963 – 3 May 2024) was an Indian Congress politician from Assam. He was elected in Assam Legislative Assembly election in 2016 from Diphu constituency as a BJP candidate. He joined Congress in 2021. He was once a Chief Executive Member of Karbi Anglong Autonomous Council.

Sum Ronghang died of multiple organ failure at a hospital in Khanapara, Guwahati, Assam, on 3 May 2024, at the age of 61.
