= Dorsing Ronghang =

Indian politician

Member of Assam Legislative Assembly
- In office 2 May 2021 – Incumbent
- Preceded by: Bir Bhadra Hagjer
- Constituency: Howraghat

Personal details
- Party: Bharatiya Janata Party
- Education: B.A.
- Alma mater: Diphu Government College
- Profession: Social Worker

Dorsing Ronghang is an Indian politician from Bharatiya Janata Party. In May 2021, he was elected as a member of the Assam Legislative Assembly from Howraghat (constituency). He defeated Sanjeeb Teron of Indian National Congress by 26,244 votes in the 2021 Assam Assembly election.
