= Prakanta Warisa =

Indian politician

Member of Parliament, Rajya Sabha
- In office 1996-2002
- Constituency: Assam

Personal details
- Born: 25 March 1965 (age 61)
- Party: Autonomous State Demand Committee

Prakanta Warisa is an Indian politician. He has represented Assam in the Rajya Sabha, the upper house of India's Parliament as a member of the Autonomous State Demand Committee.
