= Karbi script =

Karbi language is officially written in Roman script in Karbi Anglong and Dima Hasao districts of Assam, Meghalaya and Arunachal Pradesh. However, in Kamrup district of Assam prefer mostly the Assamese script.

== History ==
The written form of the Karbi language has been in development since the time of British rule in India when missionaries published the first Karbi newspaper Birta in 1903, in English (Roman Script). Since then Karbi language is being written in both Purvi Nagari script and Roman script. The Karbi Lammet Amei (Apex body of Karbi language) earlier adopted the Assamese (Purvi Nagari) script to write the Karbi language, but later changed to Roman script.

== Research on Karbi script and language ==
Since old days Karbi people has no written form. Karbis has passed their tradition orally from generation to generation. The new generations are trying to preserve them in written form, as well coining new words to compensate for missing word they have come across in new age. i.e.- bus, train, etc. Media houses has been at the forefront of the event.

In recent trend, a section of Karbi people think that Karbi language should have its own script. In one case, Sarthe Teron Milik, Writer, introduced a new series of Karbi alphabets and numerals in his book, Arleng .
