= Lunsing Teron =

Indian politician

Member of the Assam Legislative Assembly
- Incumbent
- Assumed office 4 May 2026
- Preceded by: Dorsing Ronghang
- Constituency: Howraghat

Personal details
- Born: Assam, India
- Party: Bharatiya Janata Party
- Profession: Politician

Lunsing Teron is an Indian politician from the Indian state of Assam.

== Political ==
He is a member of Bharatiya Janata Party. In 2026 Assam Legislative Assembly election, Lunsing defeated Sanjeeb Teron of Indian National Congress by a margin of 78,106 votes and subsequently elected as Member of Legislative Assembly from Howraghat constituency.
