= Haflong Assembly constituency =

Constituency of the Assam legislative assembly in India

Haflong
- Constituency No. 113 for the Assam Legislative Assembly

Constituency details
- Country: India
- Region: Northeast India
- State: Assam
- District: Dima Hasao
- Lok Sabha constituency: Diphu
- Established: 1967
- Reservation: ST

Member of Legislative Assembly
- 16th Assam Legislative Assembly
- Incumbent Rupali Langthasa
- Party: BJP
- Alliance: NEDA
- Elected year: 2026

Haflong Assembly constituency is one of the 126 assembly constituencies of Assam a north east state of India. Haflong is also part of Diphu Lok Sabha constituency. It is a reserved seat for the Scheduled tribes (ST).

== Members of Legislative Assembly ==
Year	Winner	Party
1967	J.B. Hagjer	Indian National Congress
1972	J.B. Hagjer	Indian National Congress
1978	Sonaram Thaosen	Janata Party
1983	Gobinda Chandra Langthasa	Independent politician
1985	Gobinda Chandra Langthasa	Indian National Congress
1991	Gobinda Chandra Langthasa	Indian National Congress
2001	Gobinda Chandra Langthasa	Indian National Congress
2006	Gobinda Chandra Langthasa	Indian National Congress
2011	Gobinda Chandra Langthasa	Indian National Congress
1996	Samarjit Haflongbar	Autonomous State Demand Committee
2016	Bir Bhadra Hagjer	Bharatiya Janata Party
2021	Nandita Garlosa	Bharatiya Janata Party
2026	Rupali Langthasa	Bharatiya Janata Party

== Election Results ==
=== 2026 ===
2026 Assam Legislative Assembly election: Haflong
Party	Candidate	Votes	%	±%
BJP	Rupali Langthasa	78,674	59.38	+2.75
NPP	Daniel Langthasa	28,368	21.41	N/A
INC	Nandita Garlosa	24,084	18.18	−22.98
NOTA	None of the above	1,377	1.04	+0.23
Majority		50,306	37.97	+22.40
Turnout		1,32,503		
BJP hold		Swing		

=== 2021 ===
2021 Assam Legislative Assembly election: Haflong
Party	Candidate	Votes	%	±%
BJP	Nandita Garlosa	67,797	56.73	+5.96
INC	Nirmal Langthasa	49,199	41.16	−1.5
BTP	Khandan Daulagupu	826	0.69	New
JD(U)	Longki Enghi	723	0.6	New
NOTA	None of the above	973	0.81	−0.27
Majority		18,598	15.57	+7.46
Turnout		1,19,518		
BJP hold		Swing		

=== 2016 ===
2016 Assam Legislative Assembly election: Haflong
Party	Candidate	Votes	%	±%
BJP	Bir Bhadra Hagjer	52,037	50.77	
INC	Nirmal Langthasa	43,731	42.66	
Independent	Mayasing Daulagupu	2,893	2.82	
AIUDF	Neikhol Haolai Changsan	2,723	2.65	
NOTA	None of the above	1,111	1.08	
Majority		8,306	8.11	
Turnout		1,02,495	81.26	
BJP gain from INC		Swing		

== See also ==
- Haflong
- Dima Hasao district
- List of constituencies of Assam Legislative Assembly
- Autonomous District Lok Sabha constituency
