= Numal Momin =

Indian politician and doctor

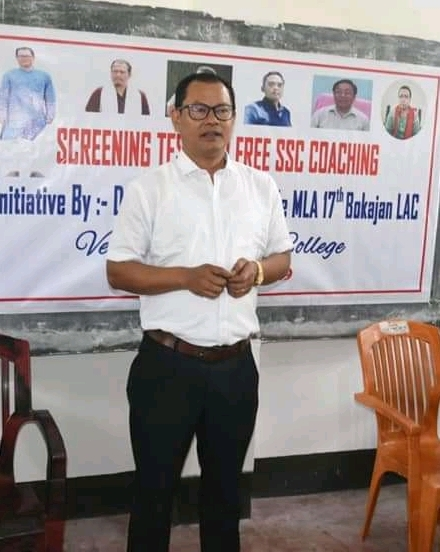
- Momin in 2016

Chairperson of Assam Urban Water supply and Sewerage Board
- Preceded by: N/A
- Succeeded by: N/A

Deputy Speaker of the Assam Legislative Assembly
- In office 21 May 2021 – 20 May 2026
- Speaker: Biswajit Daimary
- Chief Minister: Himanta Biswa Sarma
- Preceded by: Aminul Haque Laskar
- Succeeded by: Habbey Teron

Member of Assam Legislative Assembly
- In office 19 May 2016 – 4 May 2026
- Preceded by: Klengdoon Engti
- Succeeded by: Surjya Rongphar
- Constituency: Bokajan

Personal details
- Born: 25 February 1972 (age 54) Dillawjan
- Citizenship: India
- Party: Bharatiya Janata Party
- Spouse: Anupama Hajong
- Education: Gauhati Medical College (MBBS)
- Occupation: Politician
- Profession: Doctor

Numal Momin (born 25 February 1972) is an Indian doctor and politician serving as the Deputy Speaker of the Assam Legislative Assembly since 2021. He represents the Bokajan constituency in the Assam Legislative Assembly since 2016 as a member of Bharatiya Janata Party. Momin also serves as a spokesperson for the BJP Assam State unit. He is the chairperson of Assam Urban Water Supply and Sewerage Board.

== Background ==
Momin belongs to the Garo tribal community. He completed his schooling from Balipathar High School in Bokajan in 1989. He has done his graduation (MBBS) from Gauhati Medical College in Guwahati in 1999. Momin was an Assistant Professor of Gauhati Medical College. He was also an MD (Medicine) in Assam Medical College in 2006. He is married to Anupama Hajong.

== Political career ==
Momin started his political career in 2016 by contesting as a candidate by Bharatiya Janata Party for no. 17 Bokajan Legislative Assembly Constituency. He defeated his strongest rival and sitting MLA of Indian National Congress Mr. Klengdun with a margin of 4,717 votes. He has been chosen as one of the BJP spokespersons for the state unit. Momin has been appointed Chairperson of Assam Urban Water Supply and Sewerage Board and given a rank of Minister of State by Government of Assam.
