= Howraghat Assembly constituency =

Constituency of the Assam legislative assembly in India

Howraghat
- Constituency No. 109 for the Assam Legislative Assembly

Constituency details
- Country: India
- Region: Northeast India
- State: Assam
- District: Karbi Anglong
- Lok Sabha constituency: Diphu
- Established: 1967
- Reservation: ST

Member of Legislative Assembly
- 16th Assam Legislative Assembly
- Incumbent Lunsing Teron
- Party: Bharatiya Janata Party
- Alliance: National Democratic Alliance

Howraghat Assembly constituency is one of the 126 constituencies of the Assam Legislative Assembly in India. Howraghat forms a part of the Diphu Lok Sabha constituency. This constituency is reserved for the Scheduled Tribes (ST).

== Members of Legislative Assembly ==
Year	Winner	Party
1967	C. S. Teron	Indian National Congress
1972	C. S. Teron	Indian National Congress
1978	Barelong Terang	Janata Party
1983	Dorsing Terang	Indian National Congress
1985	Khorsing Engti	Independent politician
2006	Khorsing Engti	Indian National Congress
2011	Khorsing Engti	Indian National Congress
1991	Babu Rongpi	Autonomous State Demand Committee
1996	Chandrakanta Terang	Autonomous State Demand Committee
2001	Dharamsing Teron	Autonomous State Demand Committee
2016	Joyram Engleng	Bharatiya Janata Party
2021	Dorsing Ronghang	Bharatiya Janata Party
2026	Lunsing Teron	Bharatiya Janata Party

== Election Results ==
=== 2026 ===
2026 Assam Legislative Assembly election: Howraghat
Party	Candidate	Votes	%	±%
BJP	Lunsing Teron	106,229	68.23	▲11.75
INC	Sanjeeb Teron	28,123	18.06	▼7.53
CPI(ML)L	Rabi Kumar Phangcho	1,414	0.91	▼0.9
NOTA	NOTA	2,322	1.49	
Margin of victory		78,106	50.17	
Turnout		155,690		
Rejected ballots				
Registered electors				
BJP hold		Swing		

=== 2021 ===
2021 Assam Legislative Assembly election: Howraghat
Party	Candidate	Votes	%	±%
BJP	Darsing Ronghang	57,927	56.48	▲12.3
INC	Sanjeeb Teron	26,244	25.59	▼12.08
NOTA	None of the above			
Majority		31,683	30.89	
Turnout		102,567		
Registered electors		126,841		
BJP hold		Swing		

=== 2016 ===
2016 Assam Legislative Assembly election: Howraghat
Party	Candidate	Votes	%	±%
BJP	Joyram Engleng	43,378	44.18	+37.48
INC	Khorsing Engti	36,987	37.67	−12.90
Independent	Chomang Kro	15,899	16.19	−22.94
NOTA	None of the above	1,906	1.94	N/A
Majority		6,391	6.51	−4.93
Turnout		98,170	83.85	+3.28
Registered electors		1,17,070		
BJP gain from INC		Swing		

=== 2011 ===
2011 Assam Legislative Assembly election: Howraghat
Party	Candidate	Votes	%	±%
INC	Khorsing Engti	43,014	50.57	
Independent	Chomang Kro	33,279	39.13	
BJP	Topan Teron	5,697	6.70	
Independent	Hori Terang	2,069	2.43	
Independent	Dewan Rongpi	998	1.17	
Majority		9,735	11.44	
Turnout		85,057	80.57	
Registered electors		1,05,569		
INC hold		Swing		

== See also ==
- Howraghat
- Diphu Lok Sabha constituency
- Karbi Anglong district
