= Surjya Rongphar =

Indian politician (born 1972)

Member of Assam Legislative Assembly
- Incumbent
- Assumed office 4 May 2026
- Chief Minister: Himanta Biswa Sarma
- Speaker: Ranjeet Kumar Dass
- Preceded by: Numal Momin
- Constituency: Bokajan

Personal details
- Party: Bharatiya Janata Party
- Occupation: Politician

Surjya Rongphar (born 1972) is an Indian politician from Assam. He is a member of the Assam Legislative Assembly from the Bokajan Assembly constituency, which is reserved for Scheduled Tribe community, in Karbi Anglong district representing the Bharatiya Janata Party.

== Early life ==
Rongphar is from Diphu, Karbi Anglong district, Assam. He is the son of the late Poresh Chandra Rongphar. He completed his Bachelor of Arts at a college in Diphu, which is affiliated with Assam University, Silchar in 1994. He is a cultivator and declared assets worth Rs.6 crore in his affidavit to the Election Commission of India.

== Career ==
Rongphar won the Bokajan Assembly constituency representing the Bharatiya Janata Party in the 2026 Assam Legislative Assembly election. He polled 69,851 votes and defeated his nearest rival, Raton Engti of the Indian National Congress, by a margin of 17,466 votes.
