= Horen Sing Bey =

Indian politician

Member of Parliament, Lok Sabha
- In office 23 May 2019 - 2024
- Preceded by: Biren Sing Engti
- Constituency: Autonomous District

Personal details
- Born: 5 February 1970 (age 55); Doloni Terongaon, Karbi Anglong, Assam
- Political party: Bharatiya Janata Party
- Education: B.Sc. from Synod College, Shillong

Horen Sing Bey is an Indian politician from the state of Assam. He was elected to the Lok Sabha, the lower house of the Parliament of India, from Autonomous District, Assam in the 2019 Indian general election as a member of the Bharatiya Janata Party.

Horen Sing Bey is a former leader of Karbi Nationalist movement for Autonomous State in Karbi Anglong Autonomous District of Assam. He is a former leader of the now disbanded United People's Democratic Solidarity (UPDS).
