= Semsonsing Ingti =

Indian author

- Born: February 8, 1910; West Karbi Anglong (then Tika Hills), Assam, India
- Died: February 28, 1948 (aged 38); Delhi, India
- Resting place: Nagaon Baptist Church cemetery
- Other names: Ru Semsonsing Ingti
- Education: B.A. (1933)
- Alma mater: Cotton College, Murari Chand College (Sylhet)
- Occupation(s): Academic, Social and Economic Reformer
- Years active: 1937–1948
- Employer: Sub-Inspector of Schools
- Known for: Founder of Karbi Nationalism and Karbi Anglong Council, Upliftment of Karbi Tribe
- Title: Lametpo
- Spouse: Labangalata Baruah
- Children: 6

Semsonsing Ingti (1910–1948) was an Indian social and economic reformer and author. He has been called the Father of the Karbi people, for his work in uniting the Karbi, an indigenous ethnic group in Northeast India concentrated in the state of Assam. He was also called Lametpo during his heyday.

== Early life ==
Semsonsing Ingti was the second child of the late Thengkursing Ingti and Madhobi Ruth Barua. Semsonsing Ingti was educated at Golaghat Mission High School. He matriculated at Bezbaruah High School, where he returned after completing his degree and becoming a teacher. He then studied at Cotton College, Guwahati (now Cotton University) and graduated from Murari Chand College, Sylhet in 1933.

== Career ==
He was called Lametpo for being the first to write a book in Karbi.

=== Social and economic reformer ===
Semsonsing Ingti began by visiting inaccessible areas. Others would have chafed at going to such places, but he was determined to reach out and educate everyone in the world. He believed that only education would bring people from backwardness.

He battled social taboos common superstitions. For example, women were not allowed to walk beside or in front of their husbands and were forbidden to carry umbrellas, because it was considered disrespectful to their husbands. Although the Karbi people did not believe in the mistreatment of women, the social status of women remains unequal.

He spread knowledge on improving Jhum cultivation and asked farmers to live together rather than in small groups, so they could produce higher quantities of their produce.

Drinking beer is traditional in Karbi culture, but this was misinterpreted to him. Beer drinking was only for social occasions, but it had become a daily life habit for people at that time. He gave up drinking beer as an example for others.

== Works ==
- Kalakha (table book)
- Tomopuru
- Bituso
- Vopi

== Death ==
The cause of the death of Semsonsing Ingti is not settled. His health had been deteriorating since he began working. His long travel from chilly Meghalaya to scorching Delhi. Walking mostly on foot and through jungle, he was already in financial trouble and could not afford medical care, which ultimately led to his demise.

According to his eldest sister, Junaki Sailabala Ingtipi, he had sunstroke while in Delhi.
