= Dhaniram Rongpi =

Indian politician

Minister for Hills Area Development, Sericulture, and Weaving
- In office 30 January 1982 – 19 March 1982
- Chief Minister: Keshab Chandra Gogoi

Member of Assam Legislative Assembly
- In office 1967–1985
- Preceded by: Constituency established
- Succeeded by: Holiram Terang
- Constituency: Baithalangso

Personal details
- Born: c.1936
- Party: Indian National Congress
- Spouse: Sathi Terongpi
- Children: 4

Dhaniram Rongpi (c. 1936 – unknown) was an Indian politician from Assam who was a Member of Assam Legislative Assembly (MLA) and cabinet minister.

== Political career ==
Rongpi was elected MLA of Baithalangso in 1967, 1972, 1978, and 1983, He served as Minister for Hills Area Development, Sericulture, and Weaving under Keshab Chandra Gogoi.

== Personal life ==
Rongpi married Sathi Terongpi, and they had one son and three daughters together.
