= Amri Karbi language =

Sino-Tibetan language spoken in India

Amri Karbi
- Region: Assam major in the district Kamrup, Meghalaya in the district Ri-Bhoi
- Ethnicity: Karbi people
- Native speakers: 125,000 (2003)
- Language family: Sino-Tibetan: Central Tibeto-Burman?; Kuki-Chin-Naga?; Karbi; Amri Karbi

Language codes
- ISO 639-3: ajz
- Glottolog: amri1238

Amri Karbi, also known as Plains Karbi, Dumrali, is a Sino-Tibetan language spoken in parts of the states of Assam and Meghalaya in Northeast India. Amri Karbi variously treated as a variety of the Karbi language or as its own language. Amri Karbi is divided into two regional varieties: Upper Amri and Lower Amri. It is distinct from the speech of a group also called Amri Karbi in the west of the Karbi Anglong district in Assam, who speak a Hills Karbi dialect.

== Phonology ==
=== Consonants ===
Amri has 23 phonemic consonants. Allophones or alternative pronunciations are included in parentheses in the table below.

Consonants
			Bilabial	Alveolar	Palatal	Velar	Glottal
Stop	voiceless	unaspirated	p	t	c	k	
Stop	voiceless	aspirated	pʰ	tʰ		kʰ	
Stop	voiced	unaspirated	b	d	ɟ	g	
Stop	voiced	aspirated	bʰ	dʰ	ɟʰ	gʰ	
Fricative	voiceless		(ɸ)^{i}	s			h
Fricative	voiced		β				
Nasal			m	n		ŋ	
Lateral				l			
Rhotic				r			
Approximant					(j)^{ii}		

^i Alternative realization of /pʰ/ amongst some members of the younger generation. ^ii Allophone of /ɟ/.

=== Vowels ===
Amri Karbi has 7 vowels, 2 of which are marginal phonemes (included in parentheses in the table below). In addition, there are the diphthongs /ai/ and /ɔi/.

Vowels
	Front	Central	Back
Close	i		u
Close-mid	(e)		(o)
Open-mid	ɛ		ɔ
Open		a	

=== Tone ===
Three phonemic tones exist in Amri Karbi: low, mid, and high.

=== Phonotactics ===
The maximum syllable in Amri Karbi is (C)(C)V(V)(C). A limited number of onset clusters occur, the first element of which is a voiceless stop or the glottal fricative /h/, followed by /l/ or /r/. Depending on the speaker, clusters /hl/ and /hr/ can variably be produced as [h], [l] and [r], or [lh] and [rh]. All consonants but /ŋ/ can appear syllable-initially. The only consonants able to occur syllable-finally are nasals /m n ŋ/, liquids /l r/, and voiceless unaspirated /p t k/. The latter three are realized as unreleased [p̚ t̚ k̚] when syllable-final.

== Orthography ==
Latin script is used for institutional practice, both Latin and Assamese script are used in various publications.

== Locations ==
Amri (Karbi) language is spoken in the following locations in India (Ethnologue).

- Kamrup district, Assam (south of the Brahmaputra River): Chandubi, Loharghat, Rani block, Jalukbari, Pandu, Basbistha, Panikhaith, Jorabat, Sonapur, Khetri, and Kahi Kusi
- Ri-Bhoi district, Meghalaya: Nongpoh area, Barni Hat, and Umling

== See also ==
- Karbi language
