= BSF Senior Secondary School, Umpling =

School in Meghalaya, India

BSF Senior Secondary School, Umpling is a co-educational school affiliated with the Central Board of Secondary Education (CBSE) in Umpling, Shillong, in India.

BSF was established on 24 August 1969 with six students up to class III for the children of BSF personnel. It was at first run by a handful of BSF staff. It became a full-fledged primary school in 1971. By adding a class every year, it became a middle school in 1975. In 1979, the Department of Education, Meghalaya, recognized the school.

BSF became affiliated to CBSE in 1981 and was upgraded to a senior secondary school in 1987.

== Academic performance ==
In 2023, results for the All India Senior School Certificate Examination were good.

== Houses ==
The School has four Houses that students can join:

- Tagore House
- Nehru House
- Gandhi House
- Raman House

== Activity ==
In an effort to relieve students of the weekly academic stress, the school organizes Co-Curricular Activities every Saturday. This CCA includes many activities like singing competition, volleyball, basketball etc. It is held House-wise and anyone is allowed to join them (unless it is restricted for a certain age/class). The school also allows its students to partake in different competitions held across in different schools of the city. Since the inception of the school, it has been paramount to allow students to hone their skills in other activities not pertaining to academics. They are encouraged to take classes in art, music and woodcraft, some of the skills school provides its students from among the daily academic routine. Apart from these, the teachers make sure that the students take part in cleanliness and encourage planting of trees, thereby emphasizing the importance of environment.

In 2018, the school put on a Model United Nations.
