= Rupali Langthasa =

Indian politician

Member of the Assam Legislative Assembly
- Incumbent
- Assumed office 4 May 2026
- Preceded by: Nandita Garlosa
- Constituency: Haflong

Executive Member Higher Education
- Incumbent
- Assumed office January 2024
- Constituency: Diyungbra

Personal details
- Born: 30 April 1993 (age 33) Haflong, Assam, India
- Party: Bharatiya Janata Party
- Spouse: Hamdau Difusa
- Education: Banaras Hindu University
- Profession: Politician

Rupali Langthasa( in Assamese: ৰূপালী লাংথাছা) is an Indian Bharatiya Janata Party politician from Assam, India. Previously she served as an Executive Member of Dima Hasao Autonomous Council. In 2026 Assam Legislative Assembly election she won against the seating MLA of Indian National Congress candidate Nandita Garlosa.
