= Diphu =

- Town
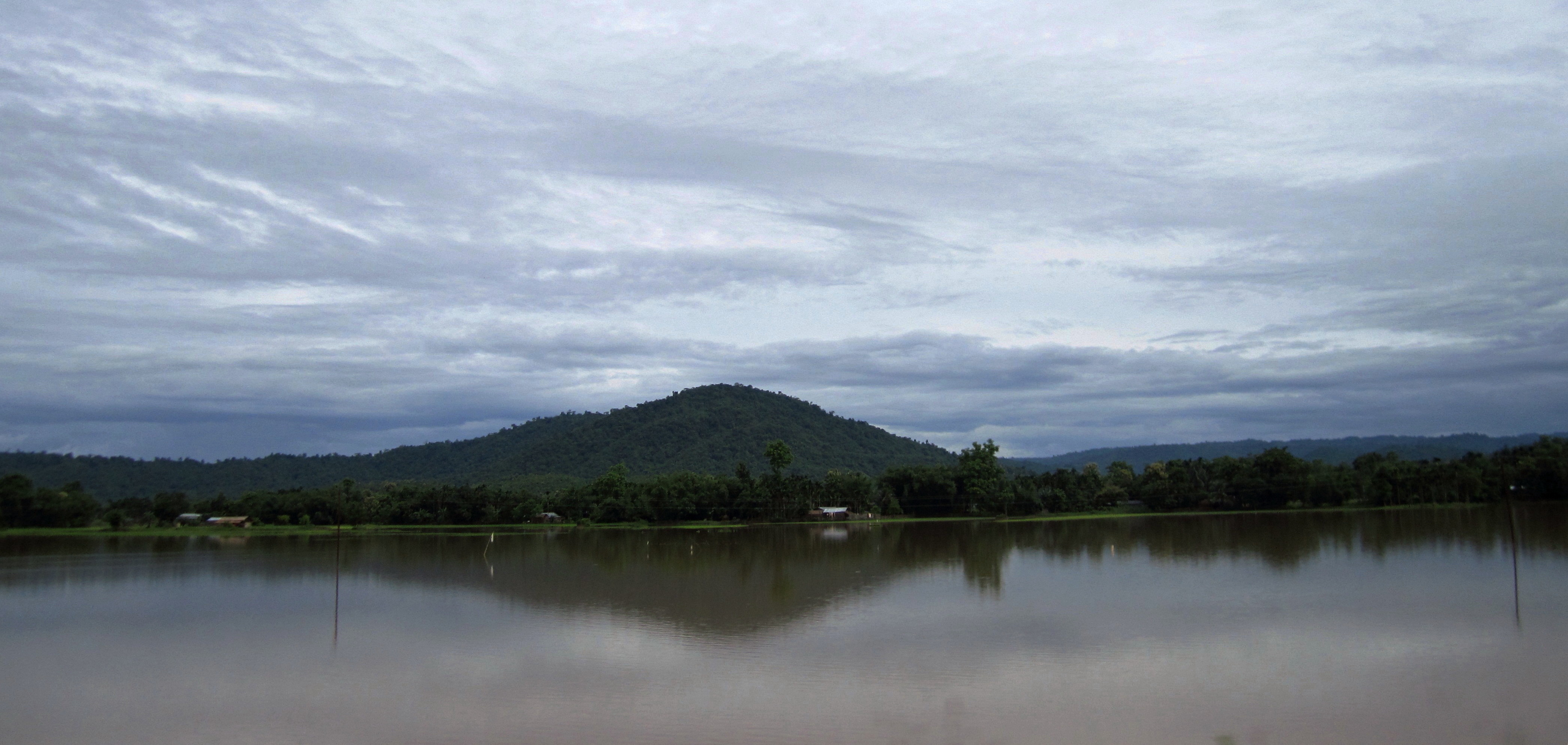
- Diphu Hills

- Location in Assam, India Diphu (India)
- Coordinates: 25.83°N 93.43°E
- Country: India
- State: Assam
- District: Karbi Anglong

Government
  - Type: Municipality
  - Body: Diphu Municipal Board

Area
  - Total: 40.042 km^{2} (15.460 sq mi)
- Elevation: 186 m (610 ft)

Population (2011)
  - Total: 61,797
  - Density: 1,543.3/km^{2} (3,997.1/sq mi)

Languages
  - Official: Karbi, English
  - Spoken: See § Languages
- Time zone: UTC+5:30 (IST)
- PIN: 782460, 782462
- Telephone code: 03671
- ISO 3166 code: IN-AS
- Vehicle registration: AS-09-X-XXXX
- Website: karbianglong.gov.in

Diphu (Assamese pronunciation: [ˈdifu: / di.ɸu]) is a town in the Karbi Anglong district of the state of Assam, India. It is the meeting place of the Karbi Anglong Autonomous Council and the headquarters of Karbi Anglong district.

== Etymology ==
The word Diphu comes from Dimasa language, 'Di' stands for 'clear liquid/water', and 'Phu' means 'to pass through', meaning a place where 'clear river passes through'. Historically, it is said that the stream in Diphu carries large amounts of sediment during the rainy season, giving it a whitish colour, hence its name. However, the rivulet from which the town derived it name has lost its beauty, due to urbanisation, encroachment, lack of regulations, and proper oversight.

== Geography ==
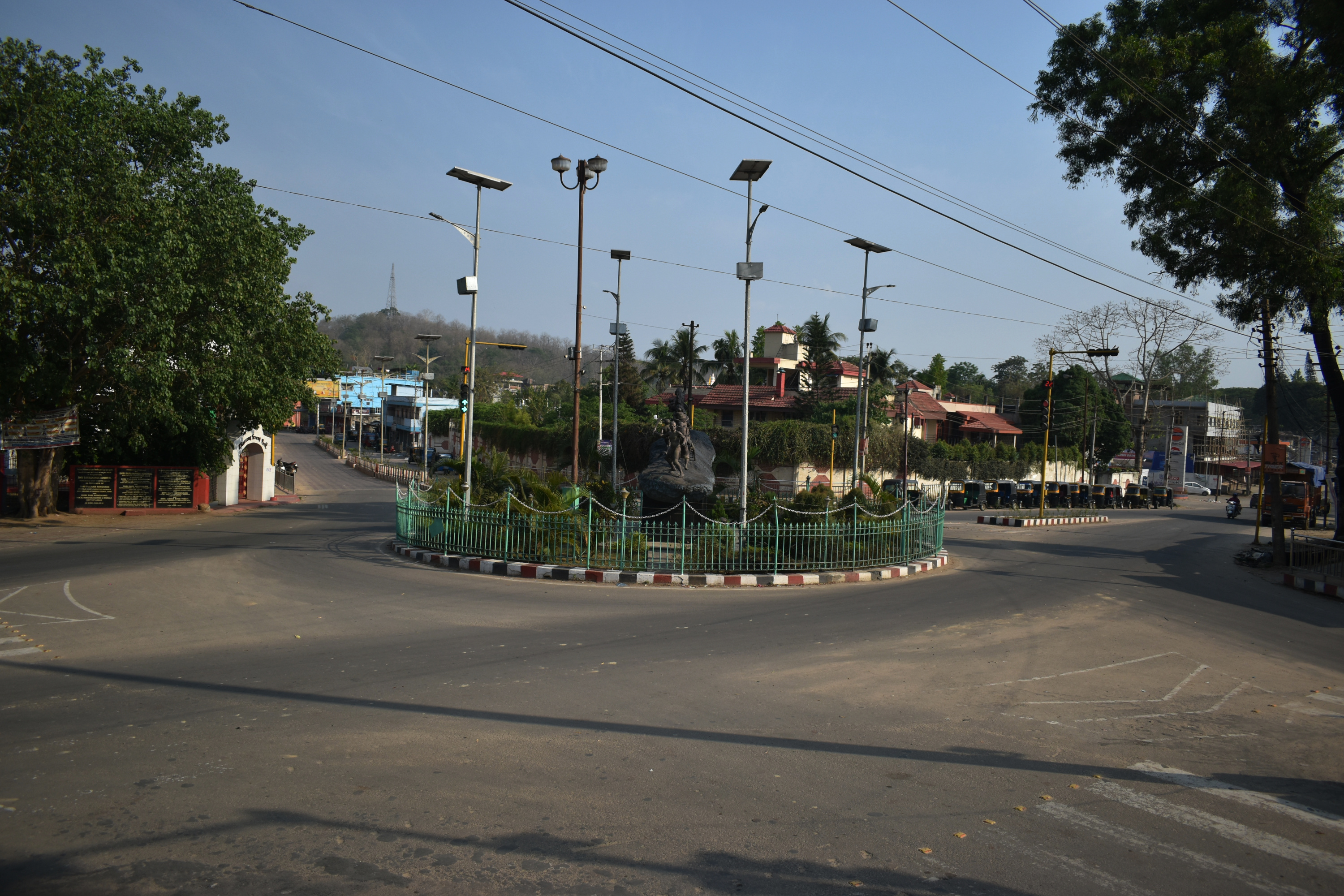
Statue of Rongpharpi Rongbe, a popular landmark (As of 2024, Statue has been moved to ISBT, Duphu)

Diphu is located at 25.83°N 93.43°E. It has an average elevation of 186 metres (610 feet). It is about 270 km by road and 213 km by railways from Guwahati. The town is located on a hilly plateau.

== Demographics ==
=== Population ===
As of the 2011 census of India, Diphu had a population of 61,797. Based on population, it is classified as a class-II city (between 50,000 and 99,999 inhabitants). Males constitute 52% of the population and females 48%. Diphu has an average literacy rate of 90%, higher than the national average of 59.5%. The male literacy rate is 94% and female literacy rate is 86%. In Diphu, 13% of the population is under 6 years of age.

=== Languages ===
Languages spoken in Diphu (2011)
1. Karbi (40.5%)
2. Bengali (21.7%)
3. Assamese (13.0%)
4. Hindi (8.54%)
5. Nepali (4.37%)
6. Bodo (3.09%)
7. others (8.83%)

Karbi is the most spoken language at 25,045 speakers, followed by Bengali at 13,400 and Assamese at 8,007, Hindi is spoken by 5,277 people, Nepali at 2,712 and Bodo at 1,909.

== Religion ==
Religion in Diphu (2011)
1. Hinduism (80.1%)
2. Christianity (11.6%)
3. Islam (6.60%)
4. Others (1.70%)

The dominant religion of the town is Hinduism, followed by Christianity and Islam.

== Culture ==
The town is home to many indigenous communities and other communities from rest of the country. Dimasa Kachari, Karbis, Rengma, Tiwa Kachari, Bodo Kachari, Garo Kachari and Rabha Kachari being the major tribes of the district. There is coexistence among the tribes. It houses temples, churches, mosques and gurudwaras. The town celebrates all the major festivals together as a community. #Karbi youth festival, Rongker, Bushu-Dima(Bisu), Wangala, Bihu, Sikpui-Ruoi, Christmas, Durga Puja, Diwali, Baikho and other festivals are celebrated.

== Educational institutions ==
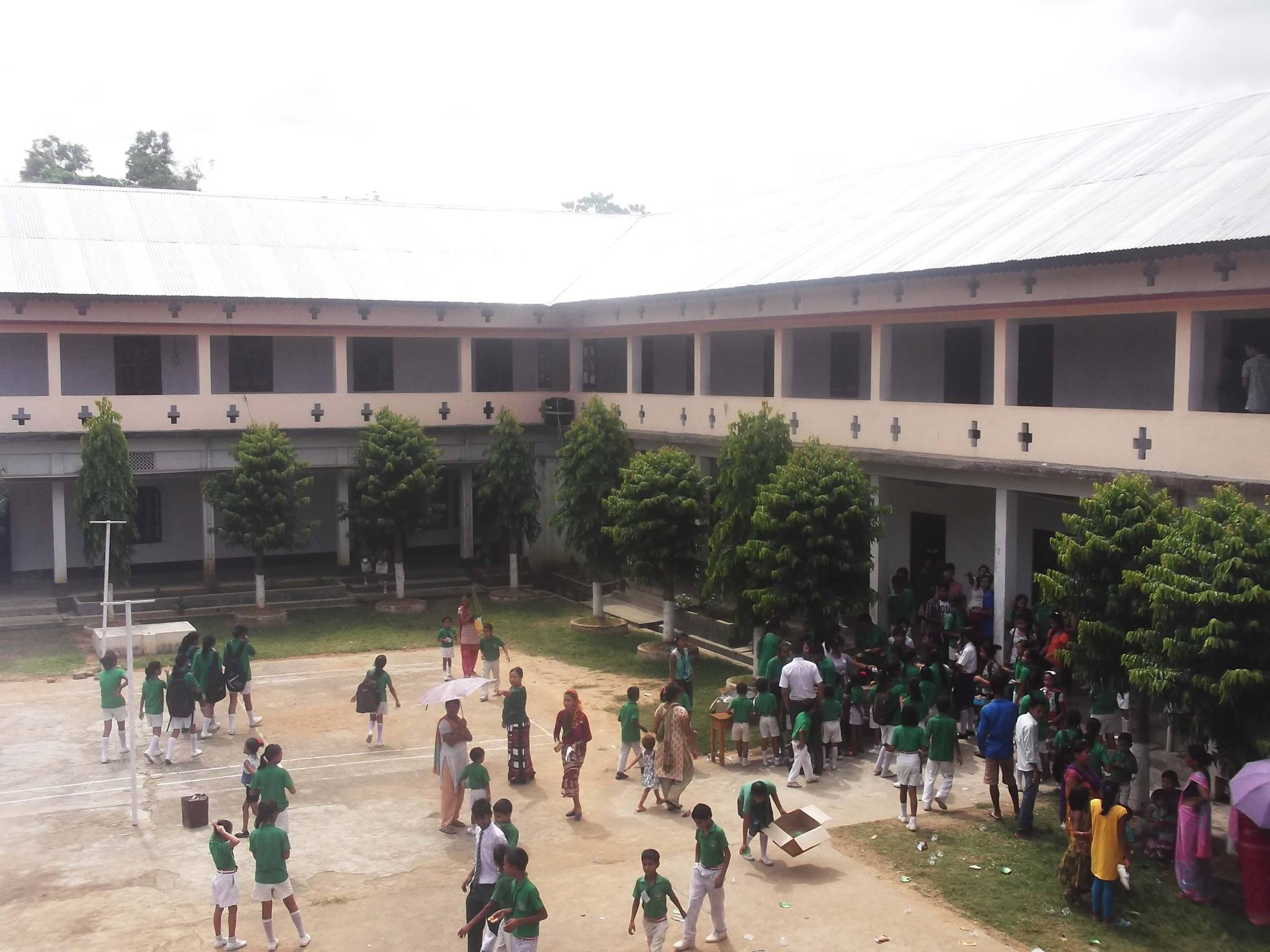
Premises of the Presbyterian Mission High School, Diphu

- Assam University, Diphu Campus
- Diphu Medical College and Hospital
- Diphu Government College
- Diphu Law College
- Diphu BEd College
- IGNOU study centre
- Industrial Training Institute (ITI)

== Health infrastructure ==
- Diphu Medical College and Hospital

== Transportation ==
=== Road ===
National Highway 329 and National Highway 329A passes through the town. Diphu is well connected to most districts and important towns of Assam by Government and private buses. Shared Car also ply between nearby town and places. Auto rickshaw is the main mode of transport within the town.

A flyover bridge is currently being built to avoid traffic congestion in the town.

=== Rail ===
The town is served by Diphu railway station of Northeast Frontier Railway zone which lies on Lumding–Dibrugarh section. Many crucial trains connect the town like Dibrugarh Rajdhani Express, Brahmaputra Mail, Kamrup Express, Jan Shatabdi Express, Chandigarh Express, Nagaland Express etc.

== Sports ==
Football is the most popular sport in Karbi Anglong. The multipurpose Karbi Anglong Sports Association (KASA) Stadium is home to Karbi Anglong Morning Star FC, a professional football club based in Diphu. It competes in the Assam State Premier League and the I-League 3. At present, Diphu has a stadium at the KASA Sports Complex and a cricket stadium near the Diphu–Manja Road.

== Politics ==
At national level, Diphu fall under the Diphu Lok Sabha constituency. Amarsing Tisso of Bharatiya Janata Party is the current Member of Parliament, and office holder of the constituency, serving since 2024.

At state level, Diphu town is under Diphu Assembly constituency, and Bidya Sing Engleng is the current MLA, and office holder of the constituency.

At Autonomous council level, Diphu fall under the purview of Lumbajong MAC Constituency of the Karbi Anglong Autonomous Council. Johny Timung is the current MAC (Member of Autonomous Council), and office holder of the constituency.

Rah Kro is the incumbent chairman (Mayor) of Diphu since 2019. He belongs to the ruling Bharatiya Janata Party. In April 2025, his tenure was extended again to 2027. Since 2019 there has been no municipal elections in Diphu due to the mounting pressure from both opposition parties and civil societies the reason has been cited as delimitation of the wards.

== Notable people ==
- Amarsing Tisso, current Member of parliament of Diphu Lok Sabha constituency (2024-present).
- Horen Sing Bey, former-M.P. (2019-2024).
- Biren Sing Engti, former-M.P. (1977-1984, 1984-1991, & 2004-2009, 2009-2014, 2014-2019).
- Jayanta Rongpi, former-M.P. (1991-1996, 1996-1998, 1998-1999, 1999-2004).
- Rongbong Terang, former Principal of Diphu Government College, and Padma Shri awardee.
- Semsonsing Ingti, founder of undemarcated Karbi Anglong & West Karbi Anglong district (the then Mikir Hills).

== See also ==
- Hamren
- Dongkamukam
- Bokajan
- Manja
- Howraghat
- Diphu Pass
