= Synod College =

- Type: Public
- Established: 1 July 1965 (61 years ago)
- Accreditation: Accredited Grade A+ by NAAC
- Academic affiliations: North Eastern Hill University
- Principal: Dr. R. M. Lyngdoh
- Location: Shillong, Meghalaya, India; 25.583°N 91.875°E
- Website: https://www.synodcollege.edu.in

Synod College, located in Shillong, Meghalaya, is a co-educational institution managed and run by the Khasi Jaiñtia Presbyterian Synod Sepngi. It was established in the year 1965 and affiliated with the North Eastern Hill University. The college is a Government aided college.

== History ==
In the year 1962, the Khasi Jaiñtia Presbyterian Synod (KJP Synod) in its general meeting, decided to set up an institution of higher education. Thus, Synod College was established on 1 July 1965 under the Christian Education Department of KJP Synod. The college started with pre-university course in Arts. Then in the year 1969 a degree course in Arts was introduced. This is followed by the opening of Science stream with pre-university course in the year 1987 and subsequently a degree course in Science from 1992.

== Departments ==
=== Science ===
- Physics
- Mathematics
- Chemistry
- Botany
- Zoology

=== Arts and Commerce ===
- Khasi
- English
- Hindi
- History
- Geography
- Education
- Economics
- Philosophy
- Sociology
- Political Science
- Commerce
- Management

== Accreditation ==
The college was first accredited by National Assessment and Accreditation Council in the year 2005 with B+ Grade. The college was subsequently re-accredited Grade A with CGPA of 3.10 in the year 2011, also Grade A with CGPA of 3.02 in the year 2017 and recently was re-accredited with Grade A+ in the 4th cycle with CGPA of 3.28 by NAAC.

== College Awards and Scholarship ==
The college has instituted various annual College Awards and Scholarships for rank holders, meritorious students and special scholarship for disabled students as follows:

1. Primrose Gatphoh Memorial Award
2. Thomas Jones Memorial Award
3. Synod College Excellence Award
4. Dr. D. Wanswet Award
5. Special Scholarship for Meritorious Students
6. Scholarship for the Differently Abled
7. Synod College Achiever's Award
8. Student with Potential Award
