= Biren Sing Engti =

Indian politician (1945–2026)

Biren Singh Engti

Member of parliament for Autonomous District
- In office 13 May 2004 – 23 May 2019
- Preceded by: Dr. Jayanta Rongpi
- Succeeded by: Horen Sing Bey
- Constituency: Diphu Lok Sabha constituency

Personal details
- Born: 2 March 1945 Barhoigaon, Karbi Anglong district, Assam Province, British India
- Died: 10 March 2026 (aged 81) Guwahati, Assam, India
- Party: Indian National Congress
- Spouse: Late Renu Terangpi
- Children: 2 sons and 1 daughter
- Education: Gauhati University
- As of 17 December, 2007

Biren Sing Engti (2 March 1945 – 10 March 2026) was an Indian politician from Karbi Anglong, Assam. He was a member of the Indian National Congress (INC) political party.

== Career ==
Engti represented the Diphu Lok Sabha constituency of Assam, having won five general elections, in 1977, 1984, 2009, and twice in 2014. He served under then Prime Minister Sri Rajiv Gandhi's ministry as Minister of State for the Ministry of Personnel, Public Grievances and Pensions, Ministry of Personnel and Training (12 May – 4 June 1986), Ministry of Public Grievances and Pensions (14 July 1986 – 14 February 1988), Ministry of Planning and Programme Implementation (1987–1989).

== Death ==
Engti died on 10 March 2026, at the age of 81.
