= Bidya Sing Engleng =

Indian politician

Member of Assam Legislative Assembly
- Incumbent
- Assumed office 21 May 2021
- Preceded by: Sum Ronghang
- Constituency: Diphu (Vidhan Sabha constituency)

Personal details
- Party: Bharatiya Janata Party
- Profession: Politician

Bidya Sing Engleng is an Indian politician in the Indian state of Assam. He serves as an MLA representing the Diphu constituency in the Assam Legislative Assembly. He was first elected in the 2001 Assam Legislative Assembly election as a candidate affiliated with Indian National Congress. He was re-elected from the same constituency in 2006 and 2011 as part of Indian National Congress, and in 2021 as a Bharatiya Janata Party candidate.
