= Baithalangso Assembly constituency =

Constituency of the Assam legislative assembly in India

Coordinates: 25.97°N 92.59°E

Baithalangso
- Former constituency No. 20 for the Assam Legislative Assembly

Constituency details
- Country: India
- Region: Northeast India
- State: Assam
- District: West Karbi Anglong
- Lok Sabha constituency: Autonomous District
- Established: 1967
- Abolished: 2023
- Reservation: ST

Baithalangso Assembly constituency was one of the 126 constituencies of the Assam Legislative Assembly in India. Baithalangso is in West Karbi Anglong district of Assam and formed a part of the Autonomous District Lok Sabha constituency. This seat was reserved for the Scheduled Tribes (ST).

This constituency was abolished in 2023.

== Town Details ==
Following are the details of Baithalangso:

- Country: India.
- State: Assam.
- District: West Karbi Anglong.
- Lok Sabha Constituency: Autonomous District Lok Sabha/Parliamentary constituency.
- Assembly Categorisation: Rural.
- Literacy Level: 86.31%.
- Eligible Electors as per 2021 General Elections: 2,10,481. Eligible Electors. Male Electors:1,07,129. Female Electors:1,03,352.
- Geographic Co-Ordinates: 25°51'10.8"N 92°26'46.7"E.
- Total Area Covered: 2998 square kilometres.
- Area Includes: Baithalangso thana in Hamren sub-division of West Karbi Anglong district.
- Inter State Border : West Karbi Anglong.
- Number Of Polling Stations: Year 2011–235, Year 2016–246, Year 2021–20.

== Members of Legislative Assembly ==
- 1967: Dhaniram Rongpi, Indian National Congress.
- 1972: Dhaniram Rongpi, Indian National Congress.
- 1978: Dhaniram Rongpi, Indian National Congress.
- 1983: Dhaniram Rongpi, Indian National Congress.
- 1985: Holiram Terang, Independent.
- 1991: Holiram Terang, Autonomous State Demand Committee.
- 1996: Holiram Terang, Autonomous State Demand Committee.
- 2001: Ruponsing Ronghang, Indian National Congress.
- 2006: Dr. Mansing Rongpi, Indian National Congress.
- 2011: Dr. Mansing Rongpi, Indian National Congress.
- 2016: Dr. Mansing Rongpi, Indian National Congress.
- 2016 (by-election): Dr. Mansing Rongpi, Bharatiya Janata Party.

Election	Name	Party
2021	Rupsing Teron	Bharatiya Janata Party

== Election results ==
=== 2021 ===
2021 Assam Legislative Assembly election: Baithalangso
Party	Candidate	Votes	%	±%
BJP	Rupsing Teron	89,715	55	+1.23
INC	Augustine Enghee	36,278	22.24	−19.16
Independent	Bikram Hanse	17,965	11.01	N/A
Independent	Sarsing Engleng	11,547	7.08	N/A
NOTA	None of the above	2,082	1.28	−0.88
Majority		53,437	32.76	+24.39
Turnout		1,63,112		
Registered electors				
BJP gain from INC		Swing		

=== 2016 by-election ===
2016 by-election: Baithalangso
Party	Candidate	Votes	%	±%
BJP	Dr. Mansing Rongpi	72,160	53.77	+17.45
INC	Ruponsing Ronghang	55,560	41.40	−1.44
Independent	Rajen Timung	3,576	2.66	N/A
NOTA	None of the above	2,899	2.16	+0.12
Majority		16,600	12.37	+5.85
Turnout		1,34,195	74.43	−6.65
Registered electors		1,80,203		
BJP gain from INC		Swing		

=== 2016 ===
2016 Assam Legislative Assembly election: Baithalangso
Party	Candidate	Votes	%	±%
INC	Dr. Mansing Rongpi	62,596	42.84	−6.65
BJP	Arun Terang	53,077	36.32	+28.09
Independent	Holiram Terang	25,171	17.22	N/A
JCP	Dhonsing Hanse	2,285	1.56	N/A
NOTA	None of the above	2,981	2.04	N/A
Majority		9,519	6.52	−0.69
Turnout		1,46,110	81.08	+5.91
Registered electors		1,80,203		
INC hold		Swing		

=== 2011 ===
2011 Assam Legislative Assembly election: Baithalangso
Party	Candidate	Votes	%	±%
INC	Dr. Mansing Rongpi	64,059	49.49	
Independent	Jotson Bey	54,721	42.28	
BJP	Arun Terang	10,654	8.23	
Majority		9,338	7.21	
Turnout		1,29,434	75.17	
Registered electors		1,72,169		
INC hold		Swing		

== See also ==
- Autonomous District Lok Sabha constituency
- West Karbi Anglong district
