= Hamren =

- Town
- Location in Assam, India Hamren (India)
- Coordinates: 25.923300°N 92.608300°E
- Country: India
- State: Assam
- District: West Karbi Anglong district
- Established: 15 August 2016
- Founder: Transitioned into a district headquarters town by Karbi Anglong Autonomous Council in 2016. Established as a small village by ancient Karbi chief.

Government
  - Type: Town Committee
  - Body: Hamren Town Committee

Population (2011)
  - Total: 8,694

Languages
  - Official: Assamese
  - Regional: Karbi
- Time zone: UTC+5:30 (IST)
- PIN: 782486
- Vehicle registration: AS
- Website: https://westkarbianglong.assam.gov.in/

Hamren (IPA: ˈhæmrən) is a hillside town and the headquarters of the West Karbi Anglong district in the Indian state of Assam.

== Demographics ==
As of the 2011 census of India, Hamren had a population of 8,694. Males constituted 50.5 per cent (4,406) of the population and females 49.5% (4,288). Hamren has an average literacy rate of 86 per cent, with male literacy at 90 per cent and female literacy at 82 per cent. Nationally, India's average literacy rate is 74 per cent.

== Geography ==
Hamren is a hillside town with the Kopili river passing through it. Towards the southern border are the hills of Meghalaya and the lake of Borapani.

== Education ==
Hamren hosts one government college, one higher secondary school and six high schools:

College:

- Waisong College, Hamren

Higher Secondary school:

- Government Higher Secondary School, Hamren

High Schools:

- Church of God High School
- Don Bosco High School
- Girls' High School
- Jirsong Government High School
- Presbyterian Mission School, Hamren
- Rishabh Junior College
- RongKarbi High School

== Transport ==
State Highway 18 (Assam) passes through the town connecting it with other districts like Hojai district and Nagaon district.

== See also ==
- Diphu
- Dongkamukam
- Bokajan
