= Bir Bhadra Hagjer =

Indian politician (1950/1951–2026)

Bir Bhadra Hagjer (1950 or 1951 – 13 January 2026) was an Indian Bharatiya Janata Party politician from Assam. He was elected in Assam Legislative Assembly election in 2016 from Haflong constituency.

Hagjer died on 13 January 2026, at the age of 75.
