= Mansing Rongpi =

Indian politician

Member of the Assam Legislative Assembly for Baithalangso
- In office 2006–2021
- Preceded by: Ruponsing Ronghang
- Succeeded by: Rupsing Teron

Personal details
- Party: Indian National Congress Bharatiya Janata Party

Mansing Rongpi BMMS (born 7 October 1958) is an Indian National Congress politician from Assam.

He was first elected to the Assam Legislative Assembly in 2006 from Baithalangso as a candidate for the Indian National Congress, and was re-elected in 2011 and 2016. Later in 2016, following his defection to the BJP he successfully retained his seat in the ensuing by-election. Rongpi did not contest the 2021 Assam Legislative Assembly election.
