= Jayanta Rongpi =

Indian politician (born 1955)

Dr. Jayanta Rongpi

Member of Parliament, Lok Sabha
- In office 21 June 1991 – 21 May 2004
- Preceded by: Biren Sing Engti
- Succeeded by: Biren Sing Engti
- Constituency: Autonomous District, Assam

Personal details
- Born: 9 June 1955 (age 70)
- Party: Autonomous State Demand Committee
- Other political affiliations: Communist Party of India (Marxist-Leninist) Liberation
- Spouse: Nirola Ingtipi
- Children: 3
- Occupation: Doctor, politician

Jayanta Rongpi is an Indian politician. He served as a Member of Parliament, Lok Sabha for the Autonomous District constituency of Assam from 1991 to 2004.

In 1991, 1996 and 1998 he was elected as a candidate of the Autonomous State Demand Committee. In 1999 he was a Communist Party of India (Marxist–Leninist) Liberation candidate. He is the only MP to win and hold the Autonomous District constituency for four consecutive general elections.
