= West Karbi Anglong district =

District of Assam, India

- District of Assam
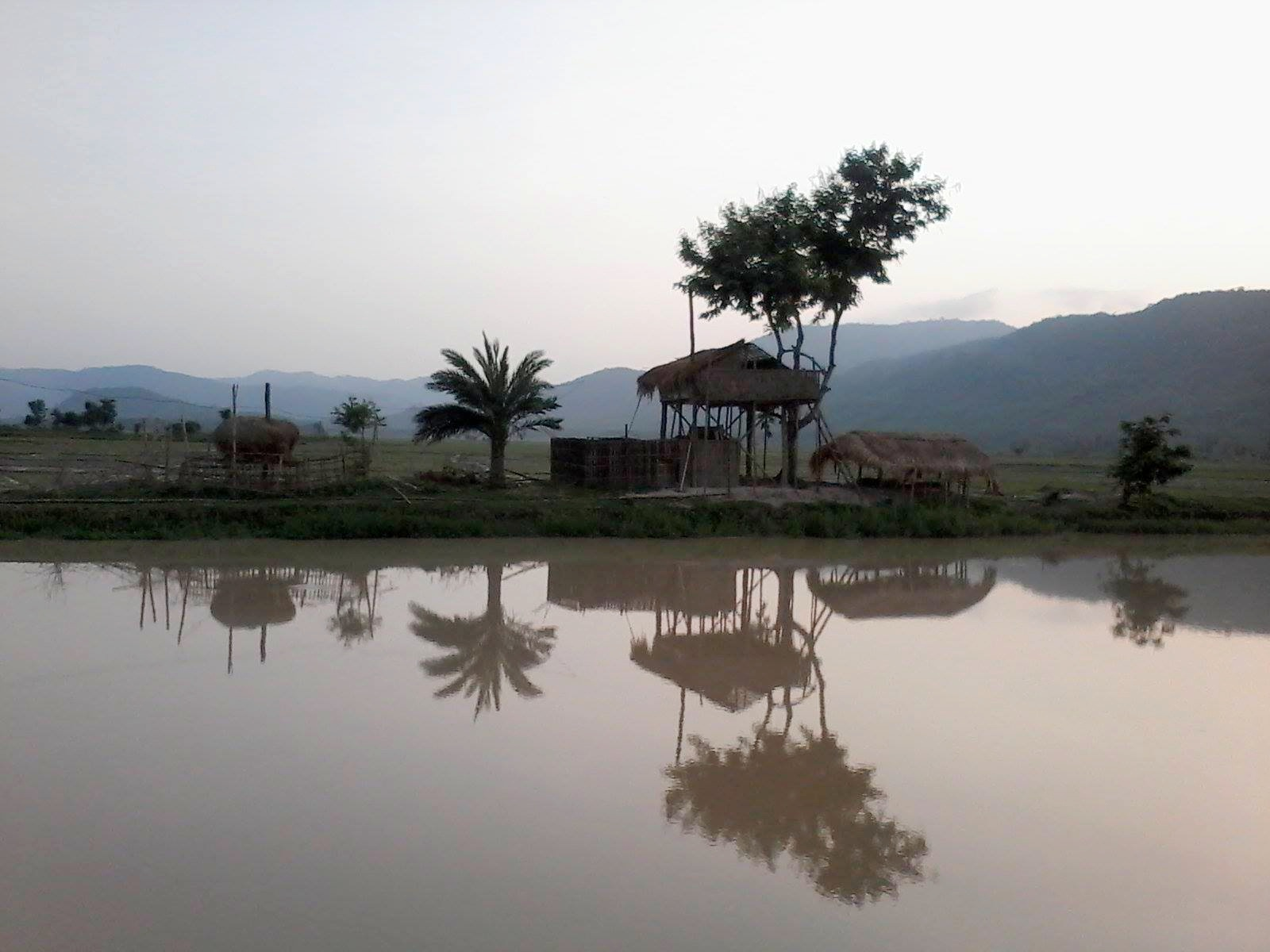
- Hills in Baithalangso

- Location in Assam
- West Karbi Anglong district
- Coordinates (Hamren): 25.85°N 92.53°E - 25.85°N 92.53°E
- Country: India
- State: Assam
- Division: Central Assam
- Established: 15 August 2016
- Headquarters: Hamren

Government
  - Lok Sabha constituencies: Autonomous District (shared with Dima Hasao & Karbi Anglong district)
  - Vidhan Sabha constituencies: Baithalangso

Area
  - Total: 3,035 km^{2} (1,172 sq mi)

Population (2011)
  - Total: 295,358
  - Density: 97.32/km^{2} (252.1/sq mi)

Languages
  - Official: Assamese
  - Regional: § Language
- Time zone: UTC+05:30 (IST)
- Website: westkarbianglong.assam.gov.in

West Karbi Anglong district is an administrative unit in the Indian state of Assam. It is a relatively new district formed out of the existing Karbi Anglong district in 2016. The administrative headquarters of the district is located at Hamren. The district is a part of the Karbi Anglong Autonomous Council and is administered according to the provisions of the Sixth Schedule of the Indian Constitution.

== Etymology ==
The name West Karbi Anglong, reflects its origin as a portion carved from the Western part of the Karbi Anglong district in 2016. Karbi is the name of the indigenous tribe that lives in and around the region while Anglong is the word they use in the Karbi language to mean a "hill" or a "mountain". So the term Karbi Anglong literally means Karbi Hills.

== History ==
Prior to the British colonisation of the area, the hill tribes of Northeast India maintained their independence from the surrounding settled kingdoms due to their geographic location being relatively isolated from the rest of the Brahmaputa valley. Following the recommendations of the Simon Commission, the hills area (now comprising the present-day districts of Karbi Anglong, West Karbi Anglong and Dima Hasao) was granted a different status under Section 92 of the Government of India Act, 1935. Classified as "Partially Excluded Areas," the Mikir Hills was exempt from the jurisdiction of the Assam government and was administered directly under the special powers of the Governor.

In the mid-1930s, Semsonsing Ingti, widely considered the "Father and architect of Karbi nation and nationalism," alongside figures like Khorsing Terang, Seng Bey, and Nihang Rongphar, emerged from the community to demand a separate administrative unit for the Karbis. In 1940, Ingti and his colleagues submitted a memorandum to the then Assam Governor, Sir Robert Neil Reid, at Mohungodijua. To further intensify the movement, a socio-political organisation called the Karbi-A-Dorbar was formed in 1946.

After India gained independence, United Mikir & North Cachar Hills, a former hill district in Assam, was constituted on 17 November 1951, under the Sixth Schedule of the Indian Constitution. And on 2 February 1970, it was divided into two separate districts: Karbi Anglong and North Cachar Hills. Despite its division in 1970, the region formerly known as the United Mikir & North Cachar Hills district continues to see ongoing aspirations for an autonomous state.

In 2016, the Karbi Anglong district was further divided into two, of which the whole existing area of the Hamren Civil sub-division, which included towns like Dongkamukam, Hamren and Baithalangso (Vothatlangso) and other adjoining areas formed the new district of West Karbi Anglong. Hamren was made the headquarter of the newly created district. However, the pre-existing Karbi Anglong district was not renamed to East Karbi Anglong.

== Geography ==
The Karbi Anglong plateau is an extension of the Indian Plate (The Peninsular Block) in the state of Assam, India. This area receives maximum rainfall from the Southwest summer Monsoon from June through September. It is bounded by Dima Hasao district in the East, Morigaon district in the west, Morigaon, Nagaon, and Hojai districts in the north, and the state of Meghalaya and Dima Hasao district in the south.

The West Karbi Anglong district is situated between 25° 33' and 26º 09' north latitude and 92º 08' and 93º 04' east longitude and it occupies an area of 3,035 square kilometres. The important rivers of this district are: The Myntriang river, Karbi Langpi river, Kopili river and Amreng river. Among these rivers, Hydroelectricity powerplants have been set up on the Myntriang and Karbi Langpi rivers.

=== Flora and fauna ===
The district has hills and plains covered with dense tropical forests and has State Reserved Forests in Amreng, Rongkhang and Jakota. The district also has District Council Reserved Forests in Sarchim, Kolonga and Amreng (1st Edition and 2nd Edition). Despite numerous hills dotting the district, only a few qualify as mountains. Laru Peak, standing at 1,290 meters above sea level, is the highest.

== Demographics ==
In 2001, the Donka sub-district of Karbi Anglong, which later became a part of West Karbi Anglong district, had a population of 2,47,169, which rose to 2,95,358 in 2011. The following table provides information about the decadal variation in population from 2001–2011 as well as the population distribution of the district, as of 2011:

Rural/Urban	Population		Decadal variation (2001–2011)	Percentage of population	
Rural/Urban	2001	2011	Decadal variation (2001–2011)	2001	2011
Rural	2,30,484	2,77,495	20.40%	93.25%	93.95%
Urban	16,685	17,863	7.06%	6.75%	6.05%
Total	2,47,169	2,95,358	19.50%	100%	100%

According to the 2011 census, West Karbi Anglong district has a population of 2,95,358. Its population growth rate over the decade 2001–2011 was 19.50%. The West Karbi Anglong district has a sex ratio of 954 females for every 1000 males, and a literacy rate of 63.35%. 17,863 (6.05%) of the total population lives in urban areas. The Scheduled Tribes comprise 65.52% (1,93,518) of the population, while Scheduled Castes make up 3.87% (11,438).

=== Religion ===
Religions in West Karbi Anglong district (Note: Donka revenue circle) (2011)
Religion	Percent
Hinduism	79.51%
Christianity	19.14%
Other or not stated	1.35%

According to the 2011 census data, Hindus form the majority religious community within the district, comprising 79.51% of the total population. Christians constitute the second-largest religious group, accounting for 19.14%. The remaining 1.35% of the population either practices other religions (Note: Includes Sikhism, Buddhism, Islam, and Other religions and persuasions (including Unclassified Sect.)) or did not state their religion.

Religion	Population (2001)	Percentage	Population (2011)	Percentage
Hinduism	2,00,251	81.02%	2,34,833	79.51%
Christianity	44,221	17.89%	56,538	19.14%
Others (Note: Including Sikhism, Buddhism, Islam, Other religions and persuasions (including Unclassified Sect.), and not stated)	2697	1.09%	3,987	1.35%
Total Population	2,47,169	100%	2,95,358	100%

=== Language ===
According to the 2011 census, Karbi is spoken as a first language by 49.68% of the population. Other languages include Bhojpuri (10.37%), Nepali (6.98%), Bengali (5.89%), Garo (5.73%), Tiwa (5.43%), Assamese (4.69%), Khasi (3.27%), Hindi (3.18%), Dimasa (1.45%), and Boro (1.28%).

Languages of West Karbi Anglong district (2011)
1. Karbi (49.7%)
2. Bhojpuri (10.4%)
3. Nepali (6.98%)
4. Bengali (5.89%)
5. Garo (5.73%)
6. Tiwa (5.43%)
7. Assamese (4.69%)
8. Khasi (3.27%)
9. Hindi (3.18%)
10. Dimasa (1.45%)
11. Boro (1.28%)
12. Others (2.05%)

== Administration ==
The district is administrated under Karbi Anglong Autonomous Council. The CEM or Chief executive member of the district is supported by 14 Executive Members of the Council. The Principal Secretary (generally an officer selected from IAS/ACS cadre) of Karbi Anglong Autonomous Council is the administrative head of the district. The Deputy Commissioner is responsible for the maintenance of law & order, and administration of justice.

Hamren is the district headquarter. The district has one sub-division, namely Hamren sub-division, and one Revenue circle, Dongkamukam.

=== Constituencies ===
There is one legislative assembly constituency, No. 20, Baithalangso (ST) in West Karbi Anglong. There are also nine autonomous council constituencies in West Karbi Anglong: Duar Amla, Amri, Chinthong, Socheng, Rongkhang, Bithung Rengthama, Kopili, Hamren and Amreng.

=== Development blocks ===
There are four development blocks under West Karbi Anglong district: Amri development block, Chinthong development block, Rongkhang development block and Socheng development block.

=== Police station ===
The West Karbi Anglong district have four police stations at the following locations: Hamren, Baithalangso, Kheroni and Jirikindeng. There are also five Police outposts in the following locations: Donkamokam, Ulukunchi, Amtereng, Mailoo and Makoilum.

== Economy ==
Agriculture is the primary economic activity for residents of the West Karbi Anglong district. Major crops cultivated in the district include ginger, sugarcane, maize, cotton, coconut, chilies, and black pepper.

Livestock rearing in Assam is highly livelihood-oriented, with over 90% of households in the district engaging in it. Pig rearing is the most common livestock activity, with nearly every tribal household in semi-urban and rural areas raising a small unit of local or exotic breeds. Dairy farming has the potential to become a major occupation for unemployed educated youth and provide significant supplemental income for small and marginal farmers, agricultural labourers, and women in the district.

== Transport ==
The district headquarter is well connected by road. Karbi Anglong Autonomous Council Transport buses run at regular intervals from the district headquarters to major destinations like Guwahati, Nagaon, Diphu, Lanka, Hojai and Jowai. As for railways there are currently no stations within the district. The nearest railway station from Hamren is in Hojai which is 48 kilometres away. There is also no airport in the district and the nearest one is Lokapriya Gopinath Bordoloi International Airport in Guwahati.

== Notable towns and places of interest ==
- Hamren
- Baithalangso
- Dongkamukam
- Shikdamakha
- Umswai

== Notable people ==
- Semsonsing Ingti
