= Karbi language =

Tibeto-Burman language spoken in Northeastern India

Karbi
- Mikir, Hills Karbi
- Arlêng
- Region: Assam, Meghalaya, Arunachal Pradesh
- Ethnicity: Karbi
- Native speakers: 528,503 (2011)
- Language family: Sino-Tibetan: Central Tibeto-Burman?; Kuki-Chin–Naga?; Karbi
- Dialects: Amri

Language codes
- ISO 639-3: Either: mjw – Karbi ajz – Amri Karbi
- Glottolog: karb1240
- ELP: Karbi
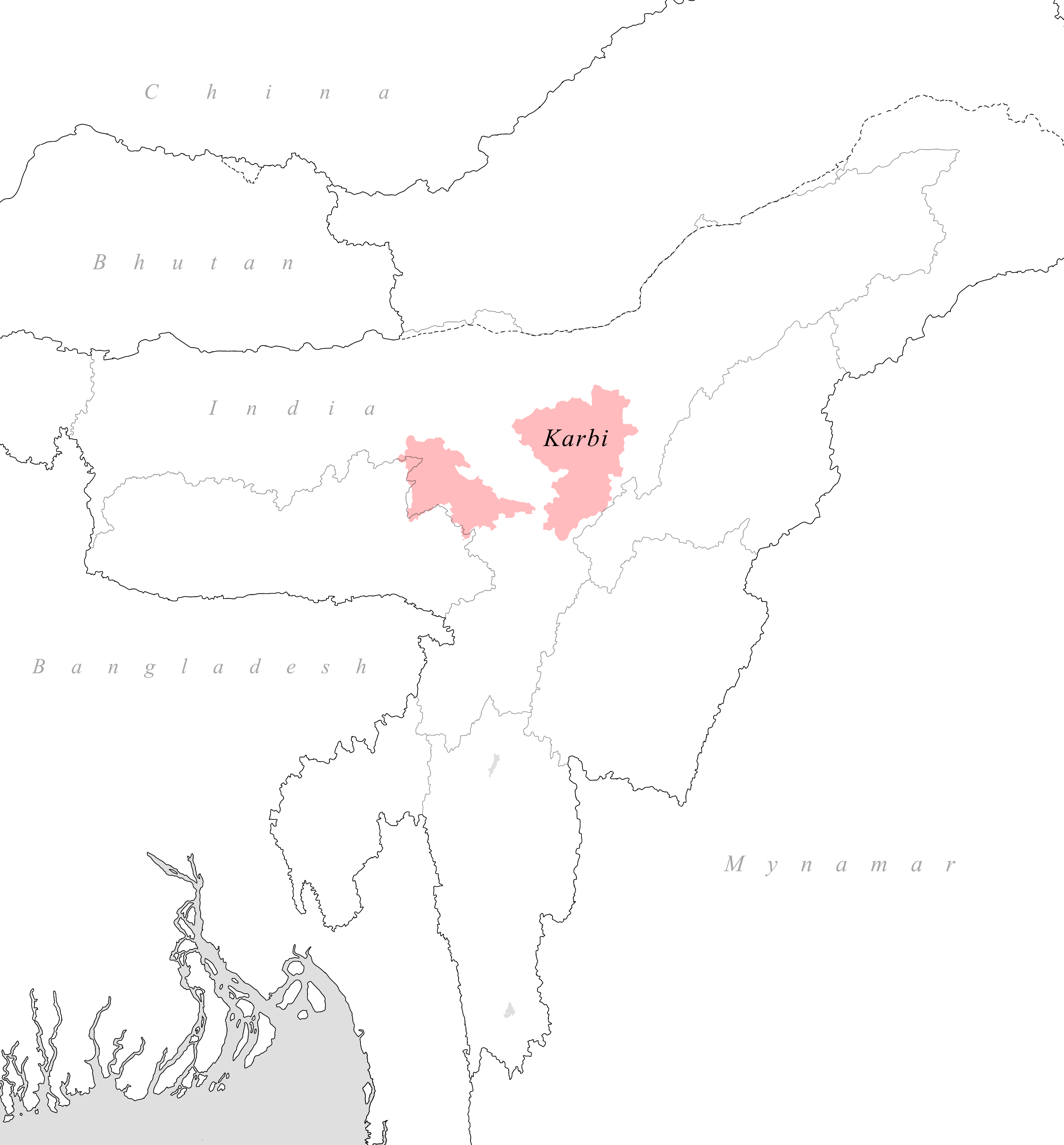
- Map showing where Karbi is spoken

A Karbi speaker speaking Karbi and English, recorded in India

The Karbi language (US: /kɑːrbi/) is a Tibeto-Burman language spoken by the Karbi (also known as Mikir or Arlêng) people of Northeastern India. It is also called Hills Karbi to differentiate it from Plains Karbi (Amri Karbi) which is variously treated as a variety of Karbi or its own language.

It belongs to the Sino-Tibetan language family, but its position is unclear. Grierson (1903) classified it under Naga languages, Shafer (1974) and Bradley (1997) classify the Mikir languages as an aberrant Kuki-Chin branch, but Thurgood (2003) leaves them unclassified within Sino-Tibetan. Blench and Post (2013) classify it as one of the most basal languages of the entire family.

== History ==
Originally, there was no written form of the language, and like most languages of Northeast India, Karbi writing system is based on Roman script, occasionally in Assamese script. The earliest written texts in Karbi were produced by Christian missionaries, in Roman script, especially by the American Baptist Mission and the Catholic Church. The missionaries brought out a newspaper in Karbi titled Birta in the year 1903, Rev. R.E. Neighbor's 'Vocabulary of English and Mikir, with Illustrative Sentences' published in 1878, which can be called the first Karbi dictionary. Sardoka Perrin Kay's 'English–Mikir Dictionary' published in 1904, Sir Charles Lyall and Edward Stack's The Mikirs in 1908, the first ethnographic details on the Karbis and G.D. Walker's 'A Dictionary of the Mikir Language' published in 1925 are some of the earliest known books on the Karbis and the Karbi language and grammar.

The Karbis have a rich oral tradition. The Mosera (recalling the past), a lengthy folk narrative that describes the origin and migration ordeal of the Karbis, is one such example.

== Varieties ==
There is little dialect diversity except for the Dumurali / Kamrup Karbi dialect, which is distinct enough to be considered a separate Karbi language.

Konnerth (2014) identifies two main variations of the Karbi language:

- Hills Karbi: Rongkhang or Ronghang dialect of Karbi Anglong, West Karbi Anglong district, Assam
- Plains Karbi (Dumra Karbi): spoken in Kamrup district and Morigaon district, Assam, and in Ri-Bhoi district, Meghalaya.

== Phonology ==
Data below are from Konnerth (2017).

=== Consonants ===
==== Initial consonants ====
		Bilabial	Alveolar	Palatal	Velar	Glottal
Stop	Voiceless	p	t	c	k	
Stop	Voiced	b	d	ɟ~j		
Stop	Aspirated	pʰ~ɸ	tʰ		kʰ	
Fricative		β~w	s			h
Nasal		m	n			
Rhotic			r~ɾ			
Approximant			l	ɟ~j		

- Palatal /ɟ~j/ constitutes free variation between a stop and a glide production.
- Also, allophonic alternations typical for the area include /pʰ~ɸ/ (within the same speaker) and /r~ɾ~ɹ/ (intergenerational and interdialectal).

==== Final consonants ====
	Bilabial	Alveolar	Palatal	Velar	Glottal
Stop	p	t		k	
Nasal	m	n		ŋ	
Rhotic		r~ɾ~ɹ			

=== Vowels ===
	Front	Central	Back
High	/i/		/u/
Close-mid	/e/		/o/
Low		/a/	

Diphthongs of Karbi	(ei)	ai	oi	ui

=== Syllable structure ===
Karbi syllables may be the open (C)(C)V(V) or the closed (C)(C)VC. Possible onset consonant cluster combinations are as follows: /pl pr pʰl pʰr tʰr kl kr kʰr/.

=== Tone and stress ===
There are three pairs of tones in Karbi: low (L), mid (M), and high (H). Unstressed syllables are often toneless. Clitics are toneless, but some suffixes, such as derivational suffixes, tend to have tone.

- ròng (L): 'village'
- rōng (M): 'plant'
- róng (H): 'to borrow'

== Grammar ==
Karbi is a highly synthetic, agglutinating language, especially in predicate morphology. Karbi nouns are however typically analytic and isolating. It distinguishes first person inclusive and exclusive pronouns. Possessive a- and plural marker -tum are used to denote plurality in periphrastic level.

te mò pí-nè-pinã-cē-dèt-jí-ma ko jīrpō pu
therefore FUT what-INDF-DISTR.PL-NEG-PFV-IRR.2-Q buddy:VOC friend QUOT
'And there won't be any difficulties, my friend?'

Karbi verb template
+4	+3	+2/+1	core	-1	-2	-3	-4	-5
proclitic	NMLZ	CAUS (pV-)/RECIP/REFL (che-)/AUTOBEN/MAL (cho-)	verb stem	DERIV	RDPL	NEG (-cē)	Aspect	AM/subordinate, non-declarative speech act-marking

== Syntax ==
Karbi noun phrase structure accepts enumeration constructions, RCs, and PCT modifiers to occur on either side of the head noun. DEMs and (NP)POSRs are restricted to the front slots, and the plural marker takes the last slot.

NP structure
1	2	3	4	core	5	6
Demonstratives	Numbers	Relative Clauses / PCT modifier	([NP]Possessor)	Head Noun	PCT modifier / Relative Clauses / Number	Plural

pinì-ke nè e-sòn a-khobór mẽ-sén arjū-lōng
today-TOP 1SG.EXCL one-CLF:thing POSS-news(IND) be-good-INT hear-get
'Today I got good news'

Role-marking has three classes: unmarked NPs, marked with -phān (non-subject) and lōng (locative). Unmarked NPs refers to NPs that display clear from context what kind of syntactic/semantic role they play in the clause. The S arguments in intransitive clauses are always unmarked, but O & A arguments may not be marked in Karbi differential object marking. OBL participants may remain unmarked as well if their role in the clause is clear from context.

nang-pō-le hēmtāp a-ngsóng chō-tē nang-tūm-ke mandú-le chō
2SG-father-FOC.IRR tree.house POSS-high.up eat-if 2SG-PL-TOP field.hut-FOC.IRR eat
'If your father takes his meal in the tree house, you eat in the field hut'

Core arguments marked with -phān are syntactically participants with the O and R roles in clause.

chonghō a-phān jamír a-bú-pen sáp-phrát~phrát-dèt
frog POSS-NSUBJ grain.sp POSS-bundle-with beat.w/flexible-IDEO~DISTR.PL-PFV
'and with a bundle of jamir they beat the frog[...]'

Locative -lōng marks oblique locational expressions in NP relation of any semantic types, human O-like locational arguments, human R-like locational arguments, as well as it may replace relator nouns that indicate specific locational and directional relations such as 'in', 'near', 'at', 'around' and such. In addition, a enclitic =pen is used to mark the instrumental, the comitative, the ablative. Diachronically, -pen is a clause final marker.

a-phì alòng thòn-dām-kòk-lò
POSS-grandmother LOC drop-go-in.a.fixed.place-REL
'and she left (the child) with the grandmother'

lasō a-bamón-pī alòng dùn-krì-lò
this POSS-wise.person(IND)-female LOC join-follow.closely-REL
'he followed his wife closely, he followed this bamónpī closely'

Clauses can combine into a chain of clauses by suffixing -si (non-final.realis), -ra (non-final.irrealis), -pen (non-final.with). Clausal chaining marks events in temporal sequence, and other clausal chaining constructions can perform other functions.

e [ánke a-pāi-tā pharlá dàm] [thēng a-khangrá ó-kòk-si] [hēm dàm-si] [hongkūp ingnì-lùn-si] [mōk che-pa-chū-si] [dō-jòi-nōi pō]
DS and.then POSS-mother-(additive.focus):DM outside.part.Karbi.house go firewood POSS-basket.for.firewood leave.in.a.fixed.place-NF:REAL house go-NF:REAL entrance.area.Karbi.house sit-big:(agent-orientated.verb)-NF:REAL breast RECP-CAUS-suck-NF:REAL stay-quiet-INF.COND.IMP father
'and then, the mother went and unloaded the firewood in the Pharla (Veranda), then entered the house, sat in the Hongkup, gave the child the milk, (and said) "be quiet, Daddy"'

== Geographical distribution ==
=== India ===
Karbi is spoken in the following areas of Northeast India (Ethnologue).

- Assam:
  - Cachar district
  - Darrang district
  - Dima Hasao district (formerly North Cachar district)
  - East Kamrup district
  - Hojai district
  - Kamrup Metropolitan district
  - Karbi Anglong district
  - Lakhimpur district
  - Marigaon district
  - Nagaon district
  - Sonitpur district
  - Biswanath district
  - Lakhimpur district
  - South Kamrup district
  - West Karbi Anglong district
- Arunachal Pradesh:
  - Papum Pare district (Balijan circle)
- Meghalaya:
  - East Khasi Hills district
  - Jaintia Hills district
  - Ri-Bhoi district
  - West Khasi Hills district
- Nagaland:
  - foothills around Dimapur

=== Bangladesh ===
An estimate 1500 Karbi live in Bangladesh.

== See also ==
- Karbi script
