= Bodo–Kachari peoples =

Group of ethnic peoples in Northeast India

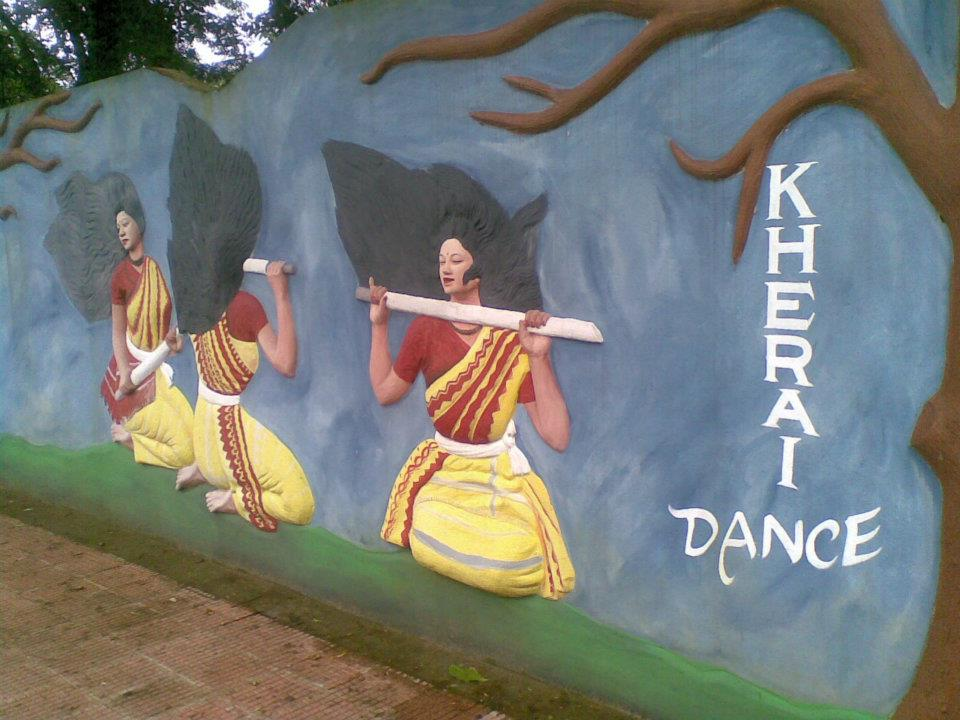
- Kherai Dance of Boro people

Total population
- c. 12–14 million

Regions with significant populations
- Assam: n/a
- Tripura: n/a
- Meghalaya: n/a
- Arunachal Pradesh: n/a
- West Bengal: n/a
- Bangladesh: n/a

Languages
- Boro–Garo languages, Assamese

Religion
- Majority: Hinduism; Minority: Bathouism; Christianity; Islam

Related ethnic groups
- Tibeto-Burman groups, Naga, Kachin

Bodo–Kacharis (also Kacharis or Bodos) are a collection of ethnic groups living predominantly in the Northeast Indian states of Assam, Tripura, Meghalaya and West Bengal. These peoples are speakers of either Bodo–Garo languages or Assamese. Some Tibeto-Burman speakers who live closely in and around the Brahmaputra valley, such as the Mising people and Karbi people, are not considered Bodo–Kachari. Many of these peoples have formed early states in the late Medieval era of Indian history (Chutia Kingdom, Dimasa Kingdom, Koch dynasty, Twipra Kingdom) and came under varying degrees of Sanskritisation.

The speakers of Tibeto–Burman are considered to have reached the Brahmaputra Valley via Tibet and settled in the foothills of the eastern Himalayan range which includes the whole of Assam, Tripura, North Bengal of West Bengal and parts of Bangladesh.

The belief that Bodo–Kacharis were early settlers of the river valleys is taken from the fact that most of the rivers in the Brahmaputra Valley in Assam and Arunachal Pradesh today carry Tibeto–Burman names of Kachari origin—Dibang, Dihang, Dikhou, Dihing, Doiyang, Doigrung etc.—where Di/Doi- means water in Boro-Garo languages, and many of these names end in -ong, which is water in Austroasiatic. The Kacharis were the first people to rear silkworms and produce silk material and were considered to be associated with ashu rice culture in Assam before the sali (transplanted rice) was introduced from the Gangetic plains.

These peoples are not culturally uniform. Bodo, Deori, Tripuri and Reang follow patrilineal descent; Garo, Rabha and Koch follow matrilineal descent, Dimasa follows bilateral descent, and Tiwa follows ambilineal descent. Some of the groups, such as Moran and Saraniya, consider themselves as Hindus under Ekasarana Dharma.

== Etymologies ==
=== Bodo ===
The term Bodo is a relatively modern term with its first mention in the book by Hodgson in 1847, to refer to the Mech and Kachari peoples. Grierson took this term Bodo to denote a section of the Assam-Burma group of the Tibeto-Burman languages of the Sino-Tibetan family, which included the languages of (1) Mech; (2) Rabha; (3) Lalung (Tiwa); (4) Dimasa (Hills Kachari); (5) Garo (6) Tiprasa (7) Deuri (8) Moran and Boro. Subsequently Bodo emerged as an umbrella term both in anthropological and linguistic usage. This umbrella-group includes such sub-groups as Mech in Bengal and Nepal; Boros, Dimasa, Chutia, Sonowal, Moran, Rabha, Tiwa in Assam, and the Kokborok people in Tripura and Bangladesh. This is in contrast to popular and socio-political usage, where Bodo denotes the politically dominant sub-group—the Boros—in the Bodoland Territorial Region.

The term Bodo generally stands for man in some of the cognate languages (Boro:Boro; Tripuri:Borok) but not in others (Garo:Mande; Karbi:Arlen). According to historians, the word "Bodo" is derived from the Tibetan Hbrogpa. The umbrella name "Bodo", denoting the umbrella group, is resisted by numerically smaller groups such as the Dimasas. Unlike Hodgson's assumption, Boro is no longer considered as the "core" of the Boro–Garo languages. Therefore, it has been suggested that the whole group should not be called "Bodo".

=== Kachari ===
The term Kachari has been used through much of history to denote the same people who came to be termed as Bodo. One of the earliest usage can be found in the 16th century Assamese language Bhagavata, where the word Kachari is used synonymously with Kirata in a list that mentions Koch and Mech separately. In Buranjis and colonial documents Boro–Garo speakers who were from the plains were collectively called Kachari. Endle's 1911 ethnographic work, The Kacharis, explain that there were plains Kacharis and hills Kacharis and a host of other ethnic groups that fall under the Kachari umbrella. Eventually the appellation kachari was retained only by those groups that have been fully integrated into Assamese society, such as Sarania Kachari, Sonowal Kachari, whereas others who were formerly called Kacharis have assumed ethnonyms, such as Boro or Dimasa.

Kachari is pronounced as Kachhāri or Kossāri. The origin of the name is most likely a self-designation korosa aris that is found in a very old Boro song:

Pra Ari, Korasa Ari
Jong pari lari lari
(We are Korosa Aris, first-born sea race
Our line is continuous)

== Origins ==
Today the peoples included in the Bodo-Kacharis speak either one of the languages from the Boro–Garo branch of Tibeto-Burman or an Indo-Aryan language such as Assamese or Bengali. It is generally believed that when the first Tibeto-Burman speakers entered the Brahmaputra Valley, it was already populated by people speaking Austroasiatic and probably other language. Bodo-Kachari community traditions as well as scholars agree that they came from the north or the east; and current phylogenetic studies suggest that the Boro–Garo language descended from Proto-Tibeto-Burman in Northern China near the Yellow River. Linguists suggest that the initial ingress took place 3000 years before present or earlier, and that the immigrant proto-Boro–Garo speakers were not as numerous as the natives. Linguists find the Boro–Garo languages remarkable in two aspects—they have a highly creolised grammar, and they extend over a vast region that radiates out into Nepal and Tripura from the Brahmaputra Valley.

=== Emergence of Boro–Garo as lingua franca ===
Burling (2007) has suggested that Nagamese, Jingpho, and Garo today are in different stages in the development as lingua francas, a cycle which leads to mixed and creolised languages, language shifts, linguistic discontinuities and ethnic mixing. It is estimated that Austroasiatic languages were present even as late as 4th-5th centuries CE, which is also supported by paleographic evidence from the Kamarupa inscriptions. The heavy creolisation occurred when Boro–Garo emerged as the lingua franca of the Tibeto-Burman and Austroasiatic populations of pre-Kamarupa, Kamarupa and post-Kamarupa kingdoms and polities of Assam, a proposition that other linguists find compelling, The Proto-Boro–Garo first as a lingua franca used for communication across the various linguistic communicates of the region and its striking simplicity and transparency reflect a period when it was widely spoken by communities for whom it was not a native language. Among these ethnic groups some of the Rabha, and Koch may have Khasi ancestors. The Tibeto-Burmification of the Valley must have been more a matter of language replacement than the wholesale population replacement. Some of the Boro–Garo speaking communities such as the matrilineal and uxorilocal Garo, Rabha, and to some extent Koch still retain cultural features that are found among Austroasiatic speakers and which are not found among other Tibeto-Burman speakers. Genetic studies too have shown that the Tibeto-Burman communities of Northeast India harbour significant population that were originally Austroasiatic speaking—for example, genetic studies show presence of O2a-M95, a haplogroup associated with AA populations, among the Garos.

== Groups ==
Group	Primary language	Primary Domain
Boro	Boro	Assam (especially Bodoland Territorial Region)
Garo	Garo	mostly in Meghalaya (western part) with a smaller number in neighbouring Bangladesh.
Chutia	Assamese	Upper Assam, Central Assam, Arunachal Pradesh
Deori	Assamese, Deori	Upper Assam, Arunachal Pradesh
Dimasa	Dimasa	Dima Hasao district
Hajong	Hajong	Meghalaya
Koch	Assamese, Koch, Kamatapuri	Lower Assam, Meghalaya, West Bengal and Bangladesh
Mech	Boro	Assam, West Bengal, Nagaland and Southeastern Nepal
Moran	Assamese	Upper Assam, Arunachal Pradesh
Rabha	Rabha	Assam, West Bengal, Meghalaya and Bhutan
Sarania Kachari	Assamese	Lower Assam
Sonowal Kachari	Assamese	Upper Assam, Arunachal Pradesh
Thengal Kachari	Assamese	Upper Assam
Tiwa	Tiwa, Assamese	Central Assam
Tripuri	Kokborok	Tripura, Mizoram and Bangladesh

=== Boro ===
The Boro people, also called Bodo, are found concentrated in the duars regions, north of Goalpara and Kamrup. The origin of Kachari term was unknown to Boro themselves, but known to others. They call themselves as Boro, Bada, Bodo, Barafisa. Barafisa translated as Children of the Bara (the great one).

=== Mech ===
The Mech are found in both Assam and Bengal. Hodgson (1847) wrote as "Mech is name imposed by strangers. This people call themselves as Bodo. Thus, Bodo is their proper designation" They speak mainly the Boro language J.D Anderson wrote, "In Assam proper Hindus call them Kacharis, In Bengal they are known as Meches. Their own name for the race is Boro or Bodo."

=== Rabha ===
The Rabha inhabit Assam, West Bengal, and Meghalaya's Garo Hills, primarily in the plains of Lower Assam and the Dooars region. Endle (1884) described them as "a small tribe inhabiting the country between the Sankosh and Dhansiri rivers, on the north bank of the Brahmaputra, in Goalpara and Kamrup." They speak the Rabha language, with three main dialects: Maitori, Rongdani, and Kocha, and a nearly extinct dialect, Dahori. Grierson (1903) noted they call themselves Rábhá.

=== Dimasa ===
Dimasas have a ruling clan among themselves who are termed as Hasnusa. Some Dimasa scholars opined that they were also known as Hasnusa at some point of time in History.

=== Chutia ===
Among Chutias, Burok means noble/great men. The Chutias, who were thought to be healthy and strong, were termed as Burok and took up the administrative and military roles in the Chutia kingdom. Even the Matak king Sarbananda Singha belonged to the Burok Chutia clan. Surnames like Bora, Borha, Borua have their origins in the Chutia kingdom and are related to Bara/Bodo/Buruk. There is mention of Manik Chandra Barua, Dhela Bora, Borhuloi Barua as commanders of Chutia army.

=== Moran ===
The Morans had their own kingdom before the arrival of Tai people and called their leader/chief as Bodousa (great son) where 'sa' means child or son in Moran language. The present day Moran language is mostly used by mixing of modern-day assamese and the Moran words which prevail have great similarities with Bodo and dimasa language. They were also known as Habungiya or Hasa where "Ha" means soil and "Sa" means son or Son of soil.

=== Deori ===
The Deoris (who were priests by profession) also have the Burok clan among them. They call themselves Jimochayan (children of the sun and Moon) and have maintained their traditional culture and language. Historically, they lived in the joidaam and patkai foothills and upper valley of Brahmaputra. There are four main geographical clans and 16-25 approx sub-clans( bojai) in deori community.

=== Tiwa (Lalung) ===
Tiwa (Lalung) is an ethnic group mainly inhabiting the states of Assam and Meghalaya in northeastern India. They were known as Lalungs in the Assamese Buranjis, though members of the group prefer to call themselves Tiwa (meaning "the people who were lifted from below"). Some of their neighbors still call them Lalung. A striking peculiarity of the Tiwa is their division into two sub-groups, Hill Tiwa and Plains Tiwas, displaying contrasting cultural features. The hill Tiwas speak Tiwa and follows matrilineality while the plain Tiwa who are more numerous in number speak Assamese and adhere to a patrilineal form of society.

=== Tripuri ===
The Tripuris are the inhabitants of the Tripura Kingdom. The Tripuri people like the Manikya dynasty ruled the Kingdom of Tripura.

== History ==
The Tripuri, Chutia, Koch, and Dimasa had established powerful kingdoms. The Tripuri kings had even defeated the Mughals and the Burmese kingdoms in the past. Today, the Boros, the Tripuris, and the Garos have established a strong political and ethnic identity and are developing their language and literature. The Sonowal Kachari is also a branch of greater Kachari. They live in the districts of Dibrugarh, Tinsukia, Dhemaji, Sivasagar, Lakhimpur, Golaghat and Jorhat.
