= Ampati =

- Town
- Location in Meghalaya, India Ampati (India)
- Coordinates: 25.470728°N 89.934529°E
- Country: India
- State: Meghalaya
- District: South West Garo Hills
- District council: GHADC

Languages
  - Regional: Garo, Koch, Hajong, Bengali
- Time zone: UTC+5:30 (IST)
- PIN: 794115
- Vehicle registration: ML 14
- Website: southwestgarohills.gov.in

Ampati is a district headquarters of South West Garo Hills of Meghalaya state in north-eastern India. South West Garo Hills is curved of present West Garo Hills on 7 August 2012. It is located at the latitude of 25º27.505 and longitude of 089º56.456 and is 52 km away from the district headquarters Tura of West Garo Hills district, Meghalaya. The hill region is mostly inhabited by the Garos, while in the foothills there are Hajongs and Koches. The second largest ethnicity after Garos is Hajong. The district is surrounded by South Salmara district of Assam and Kurigram District of Bangladesh. South West Garo Hills has approximately 35 kilometres of international boundary with Bangladesh on the south and western side. Nearly one third of the total number of villages of the district is declared as border villages by the Border Area Development Department.

== Population ==
The total population of South West Garo Hills is 1,72,495 as per Census 2011, with 87,135 male and 85,360 female population. The literacy rate of the district is 56.7%. The district comprises two Community and Rural Development Block, viz. Betasing Community and Rural Development Block and Zikzak Community and Rural Development.

=== Betasing Community and Rural Development Block ===
Total No. of household – 18,242

Total population – Male: 47,796 – Female: 47,222. Total: 95,018

Literacy rate – Male: 61.8% – Female: 53.5%. Total: 57.6%

=== Zikzak Community and Rural Development Block ===
Total No. of household – 15,621

Total population – Male: 39,339 – Female: 38,138. Total: 77,477

Literacy rate – Male: 60% – Female: 50.9%. Total: 55.9%

== History ==
In 1899, five families of Boldakgre converted to Christianity and baptized by Rev. E.G. Phillips, American Baptist Missionary.

After conversion finding difficulties to live among the non-Christian and facing hardships in jhum cultivation the five families of converts decided to leave Boldakgre once and for all. On learning that some uncultivated and uninhabited lands are lying under the A·king land of Dalbotpara and Chelipara they left their native place and came to settle under the Dalbotpara A·king land. The five families of converts were:

1. Babang Marak – Dongme G. Sangma
2. Ringran Sangma – Rimchi Sangma
3. Mibal Sangma – Sangre G. Sangma
4. Diron Marak – Okgil G. Sangma
5. Birin M. Marak – Nuchong D. Sangma

These five families were first settlers of present Ampati. They first settled near Daban Bheel beside the plate rock which is called "Ampatchi" meaning mat for drying paddy and from the word "Ampatchi" the place's name became "Ampati".

There is a legend that the plate rock was used by some legendary inhabitants for drying paddy. It is said that once one Elephant ate the paddy from that rock and the elephant was chased away by one "Matgrik" and it was killed with only single blow at a place and now the elephant has turned into a stone and that place was called "Hatisil" means "Hati" elephant "sil" means stone. Both the plate rock and the rock which look like an elephant can still be seen at Chigitchakgre and Hatisil respectively.

The five new settlers of Ampati excavated paddy fields near present Ampati (but living on the other side of the Daru river it is difficult for them to cross every now and then for tilling their lands. So they have started collecting materials and sites for construction of houses at present Ampati. At first Dinggan Gaakpa Nokma and Maharis of Chillipara refused to let them settle at their proposed place, and the materials like bamboo, log etc. collected for construction of houses were destroyed by them. But by careful manipulation of Babang A. Marak, and repeated requests by others they were allowed to settle at present Ampati. Since then their descendants are settling at present Ampati.

After settling permanently, those settlers felt that a school was necessary for their children and their grandchildren and with the aid of "Baptist Mission" a school was established in 1903 with Jatong Ch. Marak as Pondit.

With the increase in conversion to Christianity the Christian members increased, and Ampati was converted to the status of church, on 5 February 1927. The church was inaugurated on 26–27 February 1927 with the blessing of Rev. R.H.E. Wing, Rev. Rujeng Arengh, Rev. Tokan Sangma, Asian D. Shira, Pastor.

The spread of and missionary zeal people of the area awarded the value of education, and by that time one Garo youth by the name of Gracesh G. Sangma, son of Choetsing D. Sangma, the first among the Garos’ of the area to study in Bachelor of Arts (B.A.) in Serampore College, inspired for opening M.E. School. Unfortunately Gracesh G. Sangma, who was serving in Royal Air Force died prematurely in 1946 after a brief illness while he was on leave. Inspired by Gracesh Sangma, Noho B. Sangma of Darugre convened a meeting of elders and resolved for opening M.E. School at Ampati. Consequently, in 1947 an Upper Primary School was established with Noho B.Sangma, as headmaster. The School was stopped for some time in the beginning of 1948 due to some controversial matters between the headmaster Judson Sangma and students. After convening a meeting the village elders decided to appoint a new Headmaster, and from among the contenders Shri Nolidi S. Daring was persuaded to serve as Headmaster. Since 1947 to 2007 the school is functioning for 60 years.

After eleven years of establishment of M.E. School at Ampati opening of H.E. School was materialized with Mr. Nolidi S. Daring as President and Noho B. Sangma, Secretary of the Managing Committee of School, in 1960. The H.E. School was first functioned in Ampati Baptist Church Building. The H.E. School was provincialized on 1-9-1988.

The general meeting for establishment of College at Ampati was convened in 1980 but due to lack of funds the proposal could not materialized, and in 1995 Shri Nolidi S. Daring, as convener and Dr. Mukul Sangma, MLA as Chairman held a public meeting for opening a 10+2 section at Ampati High School. And after a gap of 5 years higher secondary section was started from 1 July 2001. The general meeting for opening a college was called again the third time, and this time more enthusiastic young members joined in the meeting and the college could at last opened with Mr. Asis S. Daring as Principal. The college is functioning for the time being under the Sub-Division Headquarters.

=== Creation of the Ampati Civil Sub-Division ===
After declaration of statehood to Meghalaya, the first Chief Minister Capt. W.A. Sangma, in his August visit to the General Conference of Garo National Council in 1947 promised to create a Civil Sub-Division for administrative convenience and public of the area in general, to the memorandum submitted by the primary center of GNC. The demand was immediately fulfilled by creating and administrative unit was formally declared open by Shri Sanford Marak Hon'ble Minister of Health on 14 August 1976 and functioned at the Betasing Block headquarters. Finally it was created as a full-fledged Civil Sub-Division on 15 October 1982 in the banner/name of Ampati Civil Sub-Division and continued to function at the Betasing Block headquarters. On 18 August 1988 it shifted its Office complex to its own Sub-Divisional Office Complex at Ampati, West Garo Hills. Ampati Civil Sub-Division was finally upgraded into a full fledged district as South West Garo Hills, on 7 August 2012 with its headquarters at Ampati.

== Transport ==
The district Headquarters is also all the neighboring places including one important trade center Ampati of lower Meghalaya, South West Garo Hills – Ampati District.

== Demographics ==
The town is mainly inhabited by the Garo, Hajong and others.
