= List of endangered languages in Bangladesh =

Language Endangerment Status by UNESCO Atlas of the World's Languages in Danger category

Extinct (EX)
- Extinct (EX): (lists)

Endangered
- Critically Endangered (CR); Severely Endangered (SE); Definitely Endangered (DE); Vulnerable (VU): (list); (list); (list); (list)

Safe
- Safe (NE): no list
- Other categories
- Revived (RE); Constructed (CL): (list); (list)
- Related topics: Atlas of the World's Languages in Danger; Endangered Languages Project; Ethnologue; Unclassified language; List of languages by total number of speakers
- UNESCO Atlas of the World's; Languages in Danger categories

Bangladesh hosts a number of endangered languages that are defined as languages at risk of falling out of use, generally because it has few surviving speakers. If it loses all of its native speakers, it becomes an extinct language. UNESCO defines four levels of language endangerment between "safe" (not endangered) and "extinct":

- Vulnerable
- Definitely endangered
- Severely endangered
- Critically endangered

== Status ==
According to Bangladesh Bureau of Statistics data from 2011, the country has 27 "small anthropological groups" consisting of 1,784,000 people in total. Ethnologists in Bangladesh and indigenous leaders claim that 48 indigenous communities, a total of 5 million people, are present in Bangladesh. They host 4 language families with 30 ethno-languages. 12-18 of them are endangered at varying degrees. International Mother Language Institute (IMLI) in Dhaka, a government institute, launched a project to reservation and mobilization of 37 languages (including Bengali, the dominant language of Bangladesh). Only 4 of the target languages have their own scripts — Chakma, Marma, Mru, and Meithei. Some other indigenous communities, especially the 2 lakh people living in Rajshahi, use a language called "Sadri" adopting alphabets from Hindi, Bangla, Urdu and other languages. It is used in the Sylhet tea garden area by Telugu, Santhali, Nepali and Rai communities as a lingua franca.

The Hill Tracts, a forested upland area in southeastern Bangladesh, is home to more than a dozen indigenous peoples. 50% of the indigenous people of there have no formal schooling; less than 8% complete primary education, and only 2% completes secondary. Most of the children don't understand the instructions written in Bengali. In north-eastern Bangladesh, Hari, Banai, Dalui, and Rajbongshi indigenous communities have started to use Bengali leaving their native languages due to the lack of social and economical recognition.

== List ==
Language	Countries	Speakers	Status	Comments	Ref
Bishnupriya Manipuri Creole	India, Bangladesh	115,000	Vulnerable		
Bawm	Bangladesh	14,000	Definitely endangered		
Chak	Bangladesh	5,500	Definitely endangered		
Asho Chin	Myanmar, Bangladesh	2,340	Definitely endangered		
Chin, Falam	Myanmar, Bangladesh	120,000	Vulnerable		
Chin, Haka	Myanmar, Bangladesh	446,264	Vulnerable		
Hajong	Bangladesh, India	68,000	Vulnerable		
Khasi	India, Bangladesh	865,000	Vulnerable		
Koda	Bangladesh, India	1,600	Severely endangered		
Kok Borok	Bangladesh, India	695,000	Vulnerable		
Kurux	Bangladesh	14,000	Definitely endangered		
Marma	Bangladesh	166,500	Vulnerable		
Megam	Bangladesh	6,870	Severely endangered		
Mru	Bangladesh	51,230	Definitely endangered		
Pangkhua	Bangladesh	2,730	Severely endangered		
Pnar	India, Bangladesh	88,000	Definitely endangered		
Sadri, Oraon	Bangladesh	166,000	Vulnerable		
Sauria Paharia	India, Bangladesh	117,000	Definitely endangered		

In addition to this list International Mother Language Institute (IMLI) in Dhaka counts a number of other languages as endangered including Lushai (959 speakers), Khumi (3369 speakers), Khiyang (3899 speakers), Rengmitca (40 speakers), and Patra (203 speakers).
