= Koch people =

Ethnic group in India and Bangladesh

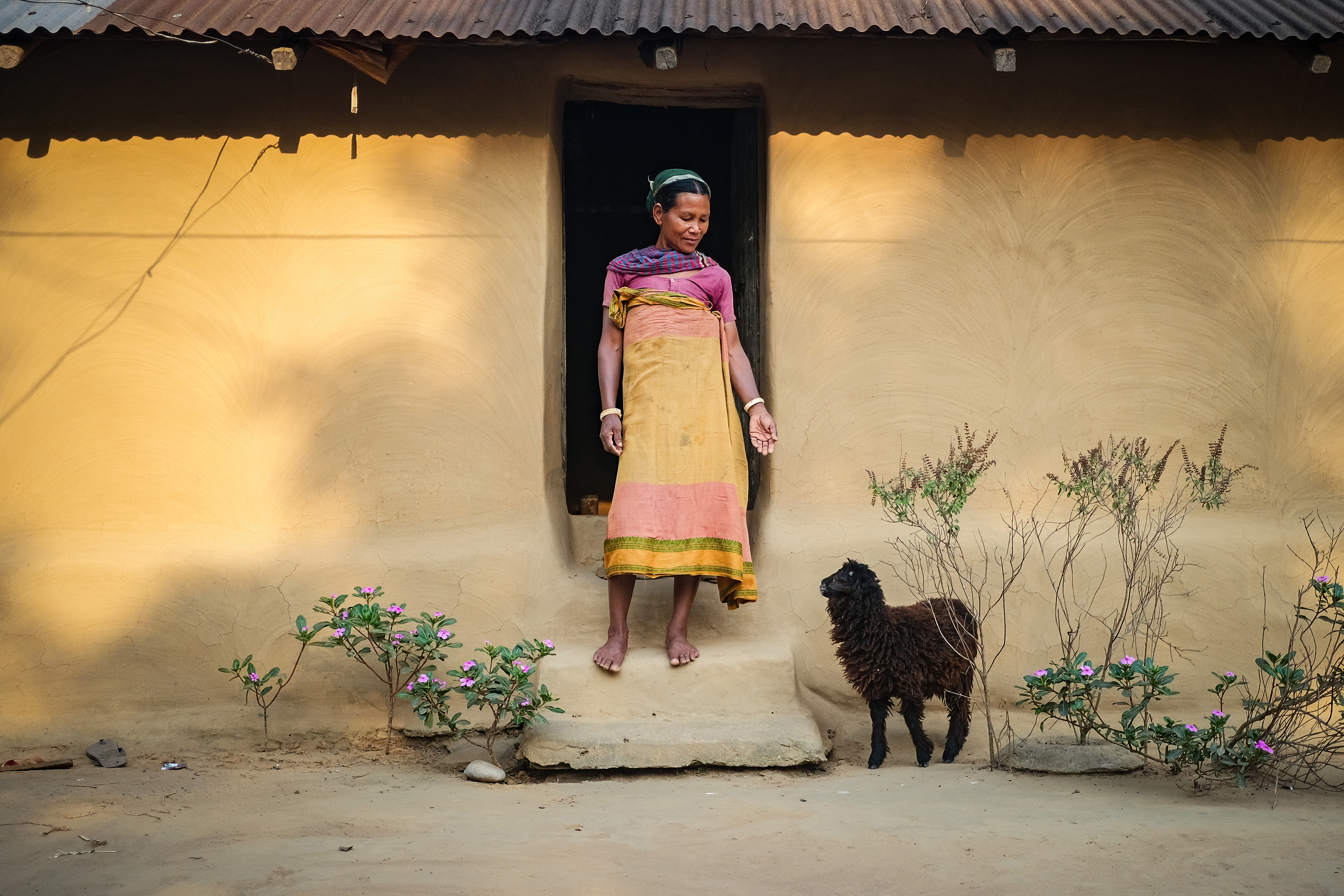
- Koch woman in Rangtia, Sherpur District, Bangladesh.

Regions with significant populations
- India Nepal Bangladesh
- India: 36,434
- Assam: 12,550
- Meghalaya: 23,199
- Bangladesh: 13,702
- Nepal: 1,635

Languages
- Koch

Religion
- Animism • Islam

Related ethnic groups
- Garo people, Rabha people, Mech people

The Koch are a small trans-border ethnic group of Assam and Meghalaya in India and northern Bangladesh. The group consists of nine matrilineal and strictly exogamous clans, with some of them preserving a hitherto sparsely documented Boro-Garo language called Koch, whereas others have switched to local varieties of Indo-Aryan languages. It is a Scheduled Tribe in Meghalaya, India. (Note: In Meghalaya, Koches are government notified scheduled tribe.) Koches want to preserve their language, culture and heritage.

The Koch people in this group are those who have preserved their languages, their animistic religions and follow non-Hindu customs and traditions. They are related but distinguished from the empire building Koch (the Rajbongshi people) and the Hindu caste called Koch in Upper Assam which receives converts from different tribes.

== Etymology of Koch ==
According to Tabaqat-i-Nasiri, western Kamrud (Kamrup) was inhabited by the Koch, Mech & Tharu. In Yogini Tantra, Koches were called as Kuvachas. According to the Fatiyah-i-Ibriah written between 1661 and 1663, Cooch Behar was inhabited by Koch.

== Groups and clans ==
The Koch people consist of nine ethno-linguistic groups: Tintekiya, Wanang, Koch-Rabha/Kocha, Harigaya, Margan, Chapra, Satpari, Sankar and Banai. These groups are generally endogamous, with very little intermarriages till recently. Each of these nine groups have matrilineal and strictly exogamous clans called nikini. The matrilineal rules of the Koch are not as rigid as the Garo and the Khasi peoples.

The group that is known as Kocha in Assam's Dhubri and Kokrajhar districts, identify with the Rabha people, and are also known as Koch-Rabha. Since the name Koch in Assam is associated with the caste Koch, this identity allows the Kocha people to benefit from state support that are open to the Rabha but not to the Koch. Advisor of Koch Development Council, writer and social worker Indramohan Koch said that the government of Meghalaya accorded ST status to Koch People while the Assam Government had not recognised them as Koch but ST status had been given in the name of Rabha.

== Languages ==
The UNESCO report mentions Koch language as "Definitely Endangered". The Koch language is spoken in the states of Assam (Goalpara, Nagoan, Dhubri, Kokrajhar, Chirang, Bongaigaon, Barpeta, Baksa, Udalguri, Karbi Anglong, Golaghat districts) and Meghalaya (West Garo Hills, South-West Garo Hills, South Garo Hills and East Khasi Hills districts). It is also spoken in some parts of North Bengal and in Bangladesh. The different Koch groups are associated with different varieties of the Koch language—at home and within their own group they use their own mother tongues; within the Koch groups they usually use the Harigaya variety which is understood by many other Koch groups; and outside the community they use Hajong, Assamese, Bengali, Garo, Hindi, and English. The relationship between the six Koch speech varieties are rather complex. They represent a dialect chain that stretches out from Koch-Rabha in the north to Tintekiya Koch in the south. This is diagrammatically represented as — Koch-Rabha (Kocha)→ Wanang→ Harigaya→ Margan→ Chapra→ Tintekiya, where the adjacent dialects exhibit more lexical similarity than those at the ends. Among the nine endogamous groups, six have retained their own language; whereas the Satpari, Sankar and Banai speak either an Indo-Aryan variety called Jharua, or Hajong (which is also sometimes referred to as Jharua).

== History ==
In Takabat-i-Nasiri, which contain records of Muhammad bin Bakhtiyar Khalji's expedition into Kamrup in 1205 A.D, there is mention that the people inhabiting between the country of Lakhanawati (Gauda) and Tibet were the Kunch (Koch), Mej/Meg (Mech) and Tiharu (Taru). In Persian history, these population (Koch, Mech, Tharu) possessed the physiognomy of the Turks and the Mongols and their language was different from the rest of the subcontinent.

== Bibliography ==
- Chatterji, S.K (1951). Kirata-Jana-Krti. Calcutta: The Asiatic Society.
- Jacquesson, François (2008). "Discovering Boro-Garo" (PDF). History of an Analytical and Descriptive Linguistic Category.
- Kondakov, Alexander (2013). Hyslop, Gwendolyn; Morey, Stephen; Post, Mark W (eds.). "Koch dialects of Meghalaya and Assam: A sociolinguistic survey". North East Indian Linguistics. 5. Cambridge University Press India: 3–59. doi:10.1017/9789382993285.003. ISBN 9789382993285.
- Kondakov, Alexander (2020). "Outline of Harigaya Koch Grammar" (PDF). Language and Culture Documentation and Description.
- Nath, D. (1989). History of the Koch Kingdom, C. 1515-1615. Mittal Publications. ISBN 8170991099.
- Salam, Maulavi Abdus (1902). Riyazu-s-salatin; a history of Bengal. The Asiatic Society.
- "List of notified Scheduled Tribes" (PDF). Census India. Archived from the original (PDF) on 7 November 2013.
