= West Garo Hills district =

Coordinates: 25.5167°N 90.2167°E

- District of Meghalaya
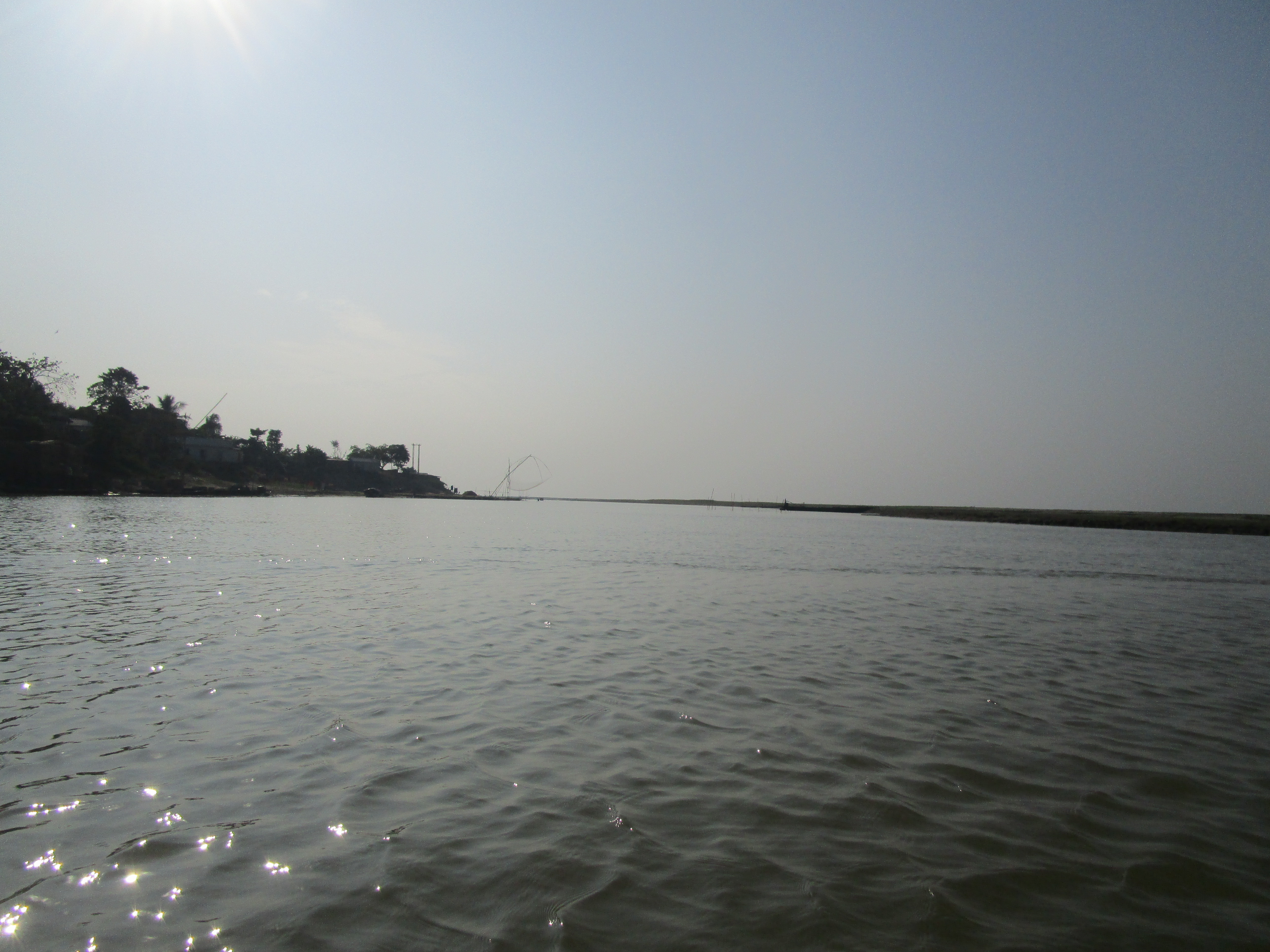
- Jinjiram River near Phulbari
- West Garo Hills district Location in Meghalaya
- Country: India
- State: Meghalaya
- Headquarters: Tura

Government
  - Vidhan Sabha constituencies: 9

Area
  - Total: 2,855 km^{2} (1,102 sq mi)

Population (2011)
  - Total: 472,497
  - Density: 165.5/km^{2} (428.6/sq mi)

Demographics
  - Literacy: 53%
- Time zone: UTC+05:30 (IST)
- Website: westgarohills.gov.in

West Garo Hills district is an administrative district in Garo Hills of the state of Meghalaya in India. Tura town is the administrative headquarters of the district. The district occupies an area of 3714 km^{2}. In 2011, its population was 643,291. As of 2011, it is the second most populous district of Meghalaya (out of 7), after East Khasi Hills.

West Garo Hills district is located at the westernmost part of Meghalaya. The district is bounded by East Garo Hills district on the east, by South Garo Hills district on the south-east, Goalpara district of Assam state on the north and north-west and Bangladesh on the south.

== History ==
On 22 October 1976, the Garo Hills district was bifurcated into the West Garo Hills district and the East Garo Hills district. In June 1992, the West Garo Hills district was further divided into two districts: the present day West Garo Hills district and South Garo Hills district. The Ampati Civil Sub-Division was upgraded to a full fledged district as South West Garo Hills with its headquarters at Ampati. It was carved out of West Garo Hills on 7 August 2012

== Economy ==
In 2006 the Ministry of Panchayati Raj named West Garo Hills one of the country's 250 most backward districts (out of a total of 640). It is one of the three districts in Meghalaya currently receiving funds from the Backward Regions Grant Fund Programme (BRGF).

=== Mahendraganj international border crossing ===
The Mahendraganj-Baksiganj international border crossing is at the Mahendraganj town in West Garo Hills district in India, on NH12 to Baksiganj in Mymensingh division, Bangladesh. It is an international crossing being further developed as part of the Bharatmala.

=== Phulbari-Dhubri Bridge on Brahmaputra river ===
- Phulbari-Dhubri Bridge: After the completion of Phulbari-Dhubri Bridge on Brahmaputra river, the district will be connected to West Bengal via Dhubri, Assam. A rail line extending from Dhubri till Mahendraganj International border can change the economy of the entire region. The Phulbari-Dhubri Bridge will be the longest bridge in the country.

== Divisions ==
=== Administrative divisions ===
West Garo Hills district presently has eight C & RD Blocks

Name	Headquarters	Population	Location
Dadenggiri	Dadenggiri		
Dalu	Dalu		
Gambegre	Gambegre		
Rongram	Asananggiri		
Selsella	Selsella		
Tikrikilla	Tikrikilla		
Demdema	Demdema		Demdema C & RD Block
Batabari	Batabari		Batabari C & RD Block

== Demographics ==
Religions in West Garo Hills (2011)
1. Christianity (60.2%)
2. Hinduism (19.1%)
3. Islam (16.6%)
4. Buddhism (0.53%)
5. Others (3.56%)

Block	Christian	Muslim	Hindu	Other
Dodenggiri	33,959	169	980	6,487
Selsella	53,155	83,484	32,691	5,876
Tikrikilla	36,317	2,400	15,789	3,882
Rongram	107,657	1,249	21,489	3,361
Gambegre	32,175	105	843	419
Dalu	41,464	264	11,486	881

The district has a Christian majority (most being from Garo community), with having significant Hindu and Muslim population (most being from Bengali community). According to the 2011 census West Garo Hills district has a population of 643,291, roughly equal to the nation of Montenegro, or the US state of Vermont. This gives it a ranking of 514th in India (out of a total of 640). The district has a population density of 173 inhabitants per square kilometre (450/sq mi). Its population growth rate over the decade 2001-2011 was 24.02%. West Garo Hills has a sex ratio of 979 females for every 1000 males, and a literacy rate of 68.38%.

Tura has a mixed population of Garos or A'chiks (as they prefer to call themselves), Bengalis, Nepalis, Assamese, members of other ethnic groups such as the Hajong, Rabhas and Koches, Bodo and a fair sprinkling of South Indians in the Catholic Church, the teaching profession and the paramilitary forces.

=== Languages ===
Languages spoken in West Garo Hills (2011)
1. Garo (50.7%)
2. Bengali (17.8%)
3. Assamese (1.85%)
4. Hajong (1.68%)
5. Hindi (1.48%)
6. Others (26.5%)

Garo (or A'chik) is the most spoken language in the district. Other languages clubbed under Garo include A'Tong. Bengali is the second largest language. Hajong, Koch and Rabha are the next largest languages. Assamese is spoken by a small minority. The Muslim non-tribals along with the Rabhas, Koches and Hajongs of the plain belt mostly study Assamese as their MIL, whereas Hindu non-tribals study Bengali as their MIL. A small minority of Hindi speakers are in the district.

== Culture ==
=== Places of Interest ===
Some places of interest in Garo Hills are Siju Cave, Nokrek Peak, Siju Bird Sanctuary, Imilsang Dare falls, Sosibibra and Rongdong falls.

Some places worth visiting in West Garo Hills are

- Bhaitbari / Wadagokgre Excavation Site
- Pelga Waterfalls
- Tura Peak Range
- Nokrek Peak in Nokrek National Park
- Nokpante Institution
- Rongai Valley
- Phulbari River side

== Flora and fauna ==
In 1986 West Garo Hills district, along with its sister districts South and East Garo Hills, became home to Nokrek National Park. The park has an area of 47 km^{2} (18.1 mi^{2}).

== Notable people ==
- P A Sangma, Most famous leader from Meghalaya. He was the Speaker of Indian Parliament and Chief Minister of Meghalaya.
- Conrad Sangma, Present Chief Minister of Meghalaya.
- Agatha Sangma, Ex Union Minister and present MP from Garo Hills. She is also the first woman MP from Meghalaya.
- Larry Sangma, A budding cricketer. Played for Meghalaya team in the Syed Mushtaq Ali Trophy and Vijay Hazare Trophy.
