= Ruga language =

Garo dialect of India

Ruga
- Native to: India
- Region: Meghalaya
- Ethnicity: Ruga
- Native speakers: 10 (2019)
- Language family: Sino-Tibetan: Tibeto-Burman; Sal; Bodo–Garo; Koch; Ruga

Language codes
- ISO 639-3: ruh
- Glottolog: ruga1238
- ELP: Ruga
- Ruga is classified as Critically Endangered language by the UNESCO Atlas of the World's Languages in Danger

Ruga is a Garo dialect, a Sino-Tibetan language that spoken in the East Garo Hills district and West Garo Hills, Meghalaya, India. Today, people who identify themselves as Ruga have shifted to Garo and only a few elderly native Ruga speakers remain.

== Ruga people ==
The Ruga people identify as a sub-tribe of a Garo people. The Ruga people have their own distinct identity. The Ruga language shares similarities with other Garo languages. It is closely related to Atong language (Sino-Tibetan) and Koch language. The Ruga speakers have lost their language and hence, they have shifted to Am·beng dialect. They mostly reside along the valleys of Bugai River and in Rugapara areas of Gasuapara block under South Garo Hills.
