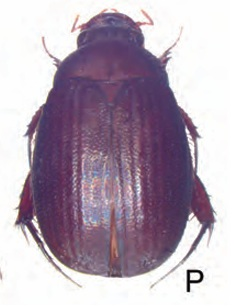

Scientific classification
- Kingdom: Animalia
- Phylum: Arthropoda
- Class: Insecta
- Order: Coleoptera
- Suborder: Polyphaga
- Infraorder: Scarabaeiformia
- Family: Scarabaeidae
- Genus: Maladera
- Species: M. garoana

Binomial name
- Maladera garoana Ahrens & Fabrizi, 2016

= Maladera garoana =

Species of beetle

Maladera garoana is a species of beetle of the family Scarabaeidae. It is found in India (Meghalaya, Mizoram, Nagaland).

== Description ==
Adults reach a length of about 8.7–9 mm. They have a dark brown, oblong-oval body with a weak iridescent shine and with yellowish antennae. The dorsal surface is nearly glabrous, except for some setae on the head and elytra.

== Etymology ==
The species name refers to its occurrence in the Garo Hills.
