= Siamspinops garoensis =

Scientific classification
- Kingdom: Animalia
- Phylum: Arthropoda
- Subphylum: Chelicerata
- Class: Arachnida
- Order: Araneae
- Infraorder: Araneomorphae
- Family: Selenopidae
- Genus: Siamspinops
- Species: S. garoensis

Binomial name
- Siamspinops garoensis Kadam, Tripathi & Sankaran, 2022

Species of spider

Siamspinops garoensis is a species of araneomorphae spider in the family Selenopidae. The species is endemic to Meghalaya, India.

The specific epithet is an adjective and refers to the type locality of the species, Garo Hills.
