= Koch languages =

Kochic-Koch
- Raba, Kochic
- Geographic distribution: India
- Linguistic classification: Sino-Tibetan: Tibeto-Burman; Central Tibeto-Burman (?); Sal; Boro–Garo; Kochic-Koch

Language codes
- Glottolog: koch1249

The (Kochic) languages are a small group of Boro-Garo languages a sub-branch of the Sino-Tibetan languages spoken in Northeast India. Burling (2012) calls this the "Rabha group" They are:

- Atong
- Koch
- Ruga
- Rabha
