= Garo Hills =

Mountain range in Meghalaya, India

Coordinates: 25°30′N 90°20′E

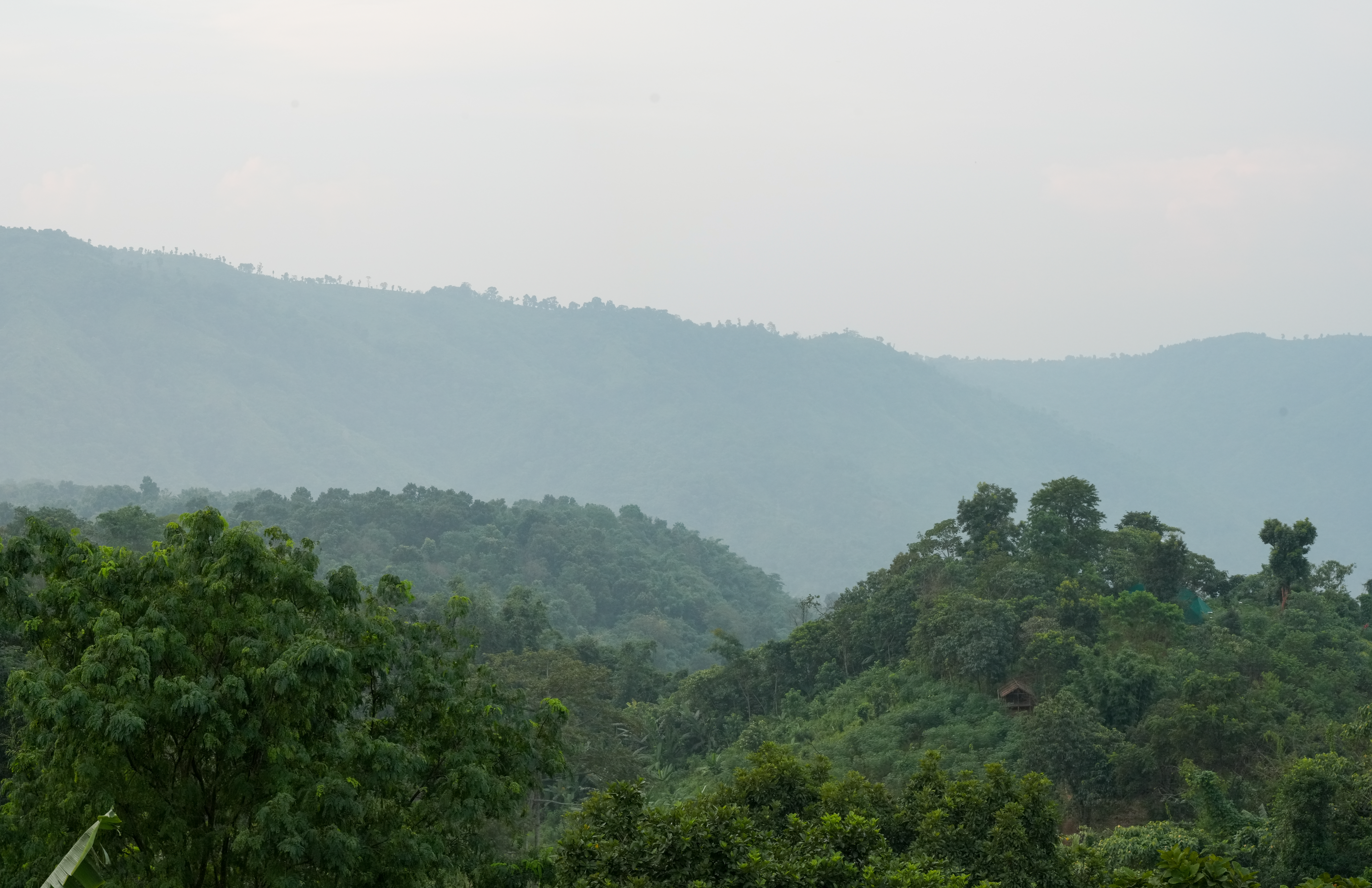
West Garo Hills, Sasatgre

The Garo Hills (Indian English: [ˈɡɑː.roː]) are part of the Garo-Khasi range in the Meghalaya state of India. They are inhabited by the Garo people. It is one of the wettest places in the world. The range is part of the Meghalaya subtropical forests ecoregion.

== Description ==
Religion in Garo Hills (2011)
1. Christianity (73.6%)
2. Hinduism (13.3%)
3. Islam (10.1%)
4. Others (2.94%)
Languages of Garo Hills (2011)
1. Garo (76.8%)
2. Bengali (12.0%)
3. Hajong (3.12%)
4. Koch (2.03%)
5. Rabha (1.91%)
6. Assamese (1.89%)
7. Hindi (1.18%)
8. Others (1.00%)

The Garo Hills were a single district of British India. The region now comprises five districts namely East Garo Hills, North Garo Hills, South Garo Hills, West Garo Hills, South West Garo Hills. It has a total population of 1,103,542. Tura is the largest town with a population of about 74,858 located at the foothills of often cloud-covered Tura peak. The town is centrally located to other popular game and wildlife sanctuaries in the district such as the national parks of Balphakram and Nokrek, and several natural limestone caves (the Siju Cave is among the longest in Asia). These places are rich reserves of natural flora and fauna and a refuge for endangered animals.

== Places of interest ==
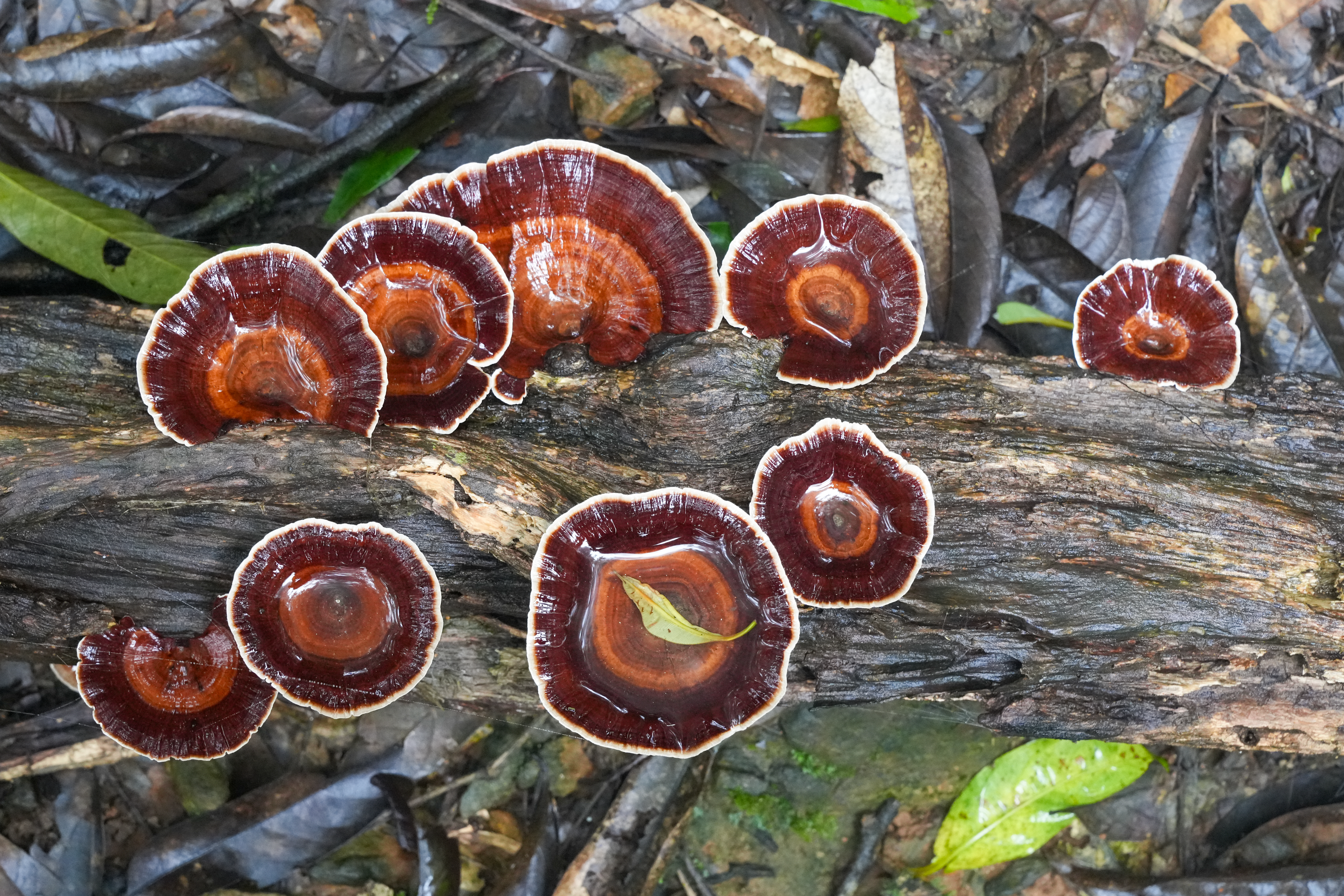
Fungus on dead log, Nokrek

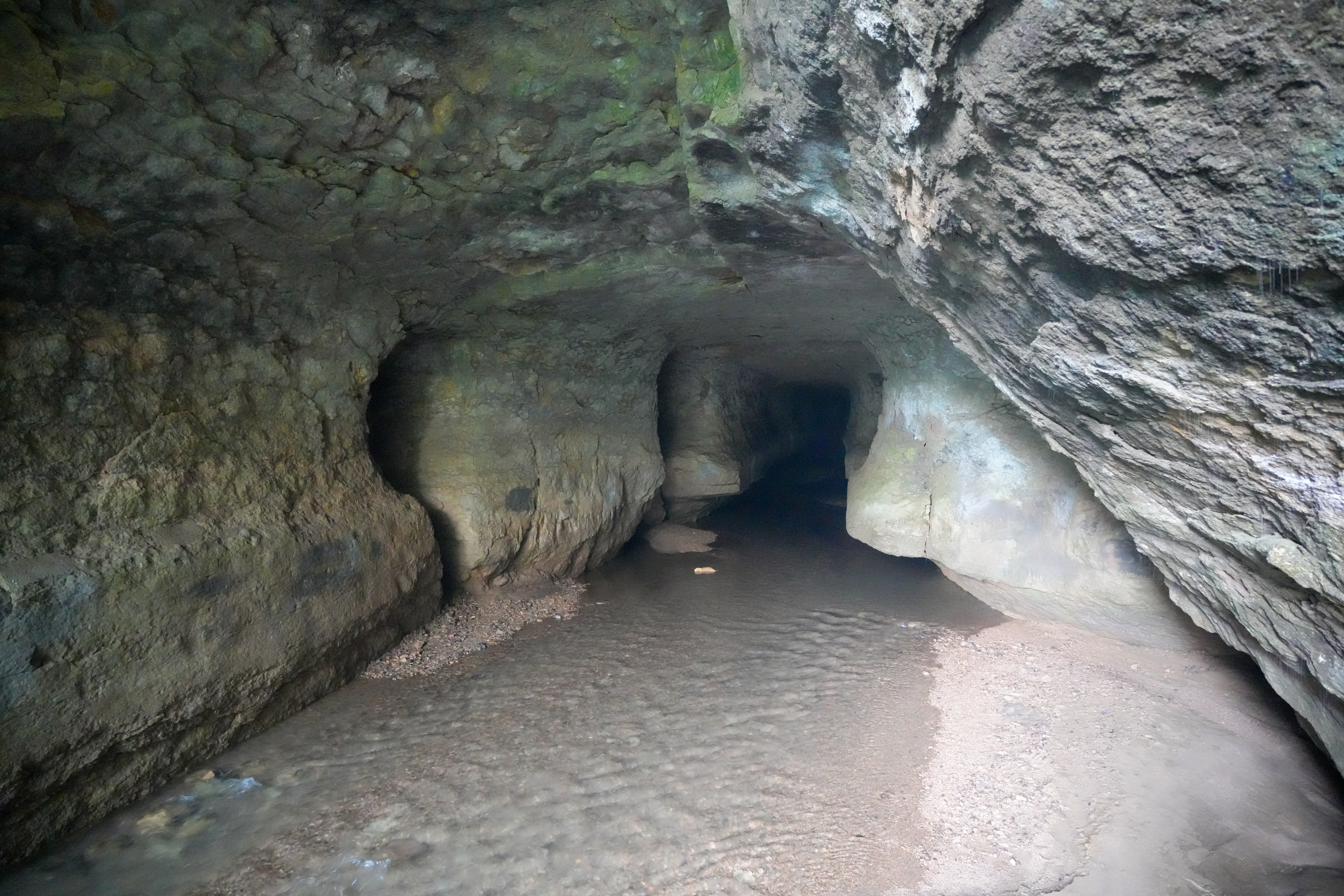
Entrance to Siju Cave

Garo Hills, known for its abundance of wildlife, attracts naturalists and photographers to capture the multifaceted sights of a unique range of flora and fauna. Two mountain ranges - the Arabella range and the Tura range, pass through the Garo Hills, forming the great Balpakram valley in between. The headquarters town of Tura, at an altitude of 657 m, is 305 km (190 mi) from the state capital Shillong. The highest point in the Garo Hills is Nokrek Peak with elevation of 1,412 m (4,633 ft).

Tura has a picturesque landscape of hills against a backdrop of low-lying plains. A sunset view can be best seen from Tura Peak at 1,400 m (4,600 ft) and its summit can be reached by a 5 km (3.1 mi) trek, partly by hiking and also by rock-climbing.

These are the locations in and around Garo Hills which are tourist spots. These include:

- Nokrek Peak
- Tura Peak
- Imilchang Dare
- Balpakram
- Napak Lake
- Siju Cave
- Wari Chora

== See also ==
- West Garo Hills district
- North Garo Hills
- Resubelpara
- Khasi Hills
- Patkai
- Songsarek religion
