= Banai (sub-tribe) =

Sub-tribe of the Koch people

The Banai is a sub-tribe of the Koches, a tribe of India.

S. N. Koch, who championed the cause of the Koches for their inclusion in the Scheduled Tribe list of Meghalaya states about the divisions of the Koches as follows. The groups or divisions of the Koches of Garo Hills as found now are Wanang, Harigaya or Sanga, Satparia, Chapra or Dasgaya or Margan, Tintikiya, Banai and Sankar Koch.

== Etymology ==
The term "Dasgaya" actually refers to the areas on the southern tract of Garo Hills of Meghalaya and includes the villages Batabari, Kapasipara, Gasuapara, Jatrakona, Makkabaripara (etc.), which had been inhabited by the Banai since ancient times. These areas are still referred to as Daskaniya or Dasgaya by the oldest people of the area.

== Clans ==
The Banais refer to their clans as "Nikini" just like the Koches do. The list of Banai clans is as follows:

- Ampabni
- Dewa
- Banai
- Dasu
- Dusa
- Dhiru
- Wanang
- Bel
- Dao
- Ditla
- Bakla
- Dankhin
- Balihata
- Chapra
- Chandigaia
- Sati
- Hari
- Noksi
- Tong
- Nakola
- Kendlai
- Kamoli
- Lamuk
- Langka
- Raba
- Pakhra
- Simsang
- Manda
- Luga
- Danggo
- Moah
- Thekao
- Chamru
- Kangkala
- Kangklai
- Lebera
- Lalung
- Hasang
- Khagra
- Khenda-gaia
- Maji
- Miri
- Chulta
- Pachwa
- Gasa-Musi
- Pira
