= Atong language (Sino-Tibetan) =

Sino-Tibetan language spoken in South Asia

Atong
- A·tong
- Native to: India, Bangladesh
- Region: Meghalaya, India and adjacent areas in Bangladesh
- Native speakers: (undated figure of 10,000, 4,600 in India)
- Language family: Sino-Tibetan: Tibeto-Burman; Sal; Bodo–Garo; Koch; Atong
- Writing system: Latin, Bengali-Assamese

Language codes
- ISO 639-3: aot
- Glottolog: aton1241
- ELP: Atong (India)
- Atong is classified as Severely Endangered by the UNESCO Atlas of the World's Languages in Danger.

Atong (spelled natively as A·tong) is a Sino-Tibetan (or Tibeto-Burman) language spoken in Northeast India and adjacent areas of Bangladesh. It is closely related to the Garo, Koch, Rabha and Bodo languages. The language is primarily spoken in the South Garo Hills and West Khasi Hills districts of Meghalaya state, as well as in the southern Kamrup district of Assam.

The spelling "A·tong" is based on the native pronunciation of the language's name, which does not contain a glottal stop. Unlike many other Sino-Tibetan languages, Atong is non-tonal.

Atong is classified as a severely endangered language by Ethnologue and UNESCO. Its decline is largely due to the influence of Standard Garo, a prestige language in Meghalaya. As a result, many parents no longer teach Atong to their children, though there are still communities in the South Garo Hills and West Khasi Hills where the language is actively spoken and transmitted to the younger generation.

== Sociolinguistics and status ==
There is no current official estimate of the number of Atong speakers. According to the Linguistic Survey of India, it was spoken by approximately 15,000 people in the 1920s. Because the Atongs are considered a subdivision of the Garos, they are not counted as a separate ethnic or linguistic community by the Indian government.

Almost all Atong speakers are bilingual in Garo to varying degrees, with Garo widely viewed as the more prestigious language. Because a Bible translation exists in Garo but not in Atong, Garo is the language used in all churches, which is significant as most Atong speakers are Christians. Garo is also the primary language of education in schools within the Atong-speaking area, though some schools provide instruction in English.

=== Mutual intelligibility with Garo ===
In India, the Atongs are officially classified as belonging to the Garo Tribe, and are members of the Garo Scheduled Tribe. However, they speak a distinct language that lacks official status. Standard Garo is used in education, administration, the press and literature.

Linguistically, Atong and Standard Garo are distinct languages with different sound systems, vocabulary and grammar. However, because most Atong speakers are bilingual in Standard Garo, mutual intelligibility is generally asymmetric: Atong speakers can understand Standard Garo, but speakers of Standard Garo typically cannot understand Atong.

== Documentation ==
A comprehensive reference grammar of the language was published by linguist Seino van Breugel in 2014. This was followed by an analysis of Atong stories in 2019, and a dictionary featuring Atong–English and English–Atong sections, along with semantic word lists, in 2021.

Earlier, in 2009, a book of stories in Atong and an initial Atong–English dictionary were published and sold at the Tura Book Room in Tura, Meghalaya. The spelling system used in these publications is detailed in the Atong Spelling Guide, which is available online.

== Phonology ==
The table below shows the phonemes of Atong in the International Phonetic Alphabet (IPA) alongside the everyday Atong alphabet. The glottal stop can be written with either a bullet or an apostrophe. The bullet ⟨•⟩ was historically used by missionaries to write the glottal stop in Garo when its writing system was created in the 19th century; the apostrophe has since been widely adopted for convenience on standard computer keyboards.

The vowel phoneme /ə/ is written as ⟨y⟩ in the orthography, similar to its usage in the Khasi and Welsh languages. Welsh Presbyterians developed the Khasi writing system and used the letter ⟨y⟩ to represent the /ə/ phoneme.

The relationship between the phonemes of Atong and their representation in the Latin orthography and Bengali script
Phoneme	Letter	Bengali	Phoneme	Letter	Bengali	Phoneme	Letter	Bengali
/pʰ/	ph	ভ	/m/	m	ম	/i/	i	ই ি
/tʰ/	th	থ	/n/	n	ন	/e/	e	এ ে
/kʰ/	kh	খ	/ŋ/	ng	ঙ ং	/a/	a	আ া
/p/	p	প	/r/	r	র	/o/	o	ও ো
/t/	t	ত	/l/	l	ল	/u/	u	উ ু
/k/	k	ক	/s/	s	স	/ə/	y	এঃ েঃ
/b/	b	ব	/t͡ɕ/	ch	চ	/iː/	ii	ঈ ী
/d/	d	দ	/d͡ʑ/	j	জ	/eː/	ee	এঽ েঽ
/ɡ/	g	গ	/h/	h	হ	/oː/	oo	ওঽ োঽ
/w/	w	ৱ	/j/	i	য়	/aː/	aa	আঽ াঽ
/ʔ/	• or ʼ	ʼ						

The consonant phoneme /s/ has both aspirated and non-aspirated pronunciations [sʰ ~ s]. The aspirated allophone [sʰ] occurs at the beginning of a syllable, while the unaspirated [s] occurs at the end of a syllable. Both are written as ⟨s⟩.

=== Glottalization ===
Glottalization in Atong operates at the syllable level and manifests as a glottal stop at the end of a syllable. It only affects open syllables and syllables ending in a continuant. In the following examples, glottalized syllables are indicated by a following bullet. The pronunciation is given in square brackets, where ⟨ʔ⟩ represents the glottal stop and a full stop represents the syllable boundary.

The following abbreviations are used in the examples below: COS 'change of state', CUST 'customary aspect', INCOM 'incompletive aspect', NEG 'negative':

If a glottalized continuant is followed by a consonant, it is not released.

- Example: man' -khu-cha [manʔ.kʰutɕa] (be.able-INCOM-NEG) 'is not yet possible'.

If a glottalized continuant is followed by a vowel, it is released, and the release repeats the continuant so that it acts as the onset of the following syllable.

- Example: man' -ok [manʔ.nok] (be.able-COS) 'was able'.

In a glottalized syllable with a final /l/, the glottal stop usually precedes the oral closure of the [l] when followed by another vowel.

- Example: mel' -a [meʔ.la] (be.fat-CUST) 'is fat'.

This phenomenon also occurs, though less frequently, with syllables ending in /m/.

- Example: nom' -a [noʔ.ma ~ nomʔ.ma] (be.soft-CUST) 'is soft'.

=== Vowels ===
Atong has six vowel qualities that occur in native vocabulary and loanwords: /i e a ə o u/. Additionally, there are four long vowels found exclusively in loanwords from English and Indic languages. These are usually pronounced longer than indigenous vowels: /iː/ [iː ~ i], /eː/ [eː ~ e], /aː/ [aː ~ a] and /oː/ [oː ~ o]. In the orthography, long vowels are represented by double letters. (Note that /uː/ and /əː/ are not attested).

Examples of minimal pairs and near-minimal pairs are given in the table below:

Minimal and near-minimal pairs of words with and without long vowels
With short vowels	English translation	With long vowels	English translation
tin	'corrugated iron'	tiin baji	'three o'clock'
pel-	'to copulate'	peel dong'ok	'failed'
mat	'wild animal'	aat baji	'eight o'clock'
ret	'children's game'	reel	'rails, train'
ba'-	'to be born, give birth'	baaa	'the sound a cow makes'

The difference between loan and indigenous words is a matter of vowel quality. In closed syllables, where native Atong vowels would be pronounced lowered and more retracted, the loan vowels maintain the same quality as Atong vowels in open syllables. Not all loanwords that have long vowels in their source language retain them in Atong, and not all loans pronounced with a long vowel in Atong have a long vowel in their source language.

=== Syllable structure ===
The canonical syllable structure of Atong is (C)V(C), where C stands for any consonant and V for any vowel. This structure is maintained if words like mai 'rice', askui 'star' and chokhoi 'fishing basket' are analyzed as containing a vowel and a final glide (see glide (linguistics)). The glide, represented by the letter ⟨i⟩, acts as the coda of the syllable rather than an element of the nucleus. In phonemic writing, these words would be represented as: /maj/, /askuj/ and /t͡ɕokʰoj/.

There are two glides in the language: /w/ and /j/. The glide /w/ occurs in both syllable-initial and syllable-final positions (e.g., wak 'pig' and saw 'rotten, fermented'). The glide /j/ occurs only syllable-finally (e.g., tyi /təj/ 'water'). Traditional words with a CVVC structure do not exist (e.g., *gaut or *main).

If a diphthong is defined as "two vowels that can occur in the nucleus of a syllable", then Atong has no diphthongs. While some words are written with two adjacent vowel graphemes (e.g., mai 'rice'), the letter ⟨i⟩ in these cases represents a consonant phoneme (the off-glide /j/). The writing system uses the letter ⟨i⟩ for this purpose because the letters ⟨j⟩ and ⟨y⟩ are already used to represent other phonemes.

== Vocabulary ==
=== Examples ===
Atong (Latin/Roman alphabet)	English
Nang' jama / chola bykphyl.	Your shirt is inside out.
Na'a angna tangka hyn'chawama?	Won't you give me any money?
Ningba ytykyi takwa ga'nima?	Will it be good if we do it like this?

=== Loanwords ===
Atong has incorporated many loanwords from Assamese, Bengali, Hindi and English. These loanwords are phonetically adapted to Atong orthography, with some violating traditional Atong phonotactics.

Examples of English loans include: redio ('radio'), rens ('wrench'), skul ('school') and miting ('meeting'). Other examples include chola (from Assamese: চোলা /sʊla/ 'jacket, tunic, coat') and jama (from Assamese: জামা /jāmā/ 'coat, shirt, blouse jacket').
