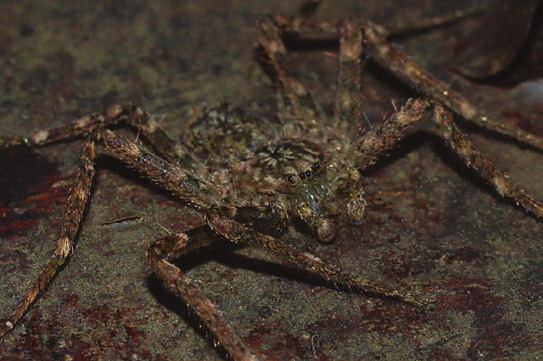
- S. formosensis

Scientific classification
- Kingdom: Animalia
- Phylum: Arthropoda
- Subphylum: Chelicerata
- Class: Arachnida
- Order: Araneae
- Infraorder: Araneomorphae
- Family: Selenopidae
- Genus: Siamspinops; Dankittipakul & Corronca, 2009

Type species
- S. spinosissimus Dankittipakul & Corronca, 2009

Species
- 6, see text

Synonyms
- Pakawops Crews & Harvey, 2011

= Siamspinops =

Genus of spiders

Siamspinops is a genus of Asian wall spiders that was first described by P. Dankittipakul & J. A. Corronca in 2009. It was merged with the monotypic genus Pakawops in 2019.

== Species ==
As of February 2024 it contains nine species, found in Asia:

- Siamspinops aculeatus (Simon, 1901) – Malaysia
- Siamspinops allospinosus Dankittipakul & Corronca, 2009 – Thailand
- Siamspinops banna Lin & Li, 2022 – China
- Siamspinops garoensis (Kadam, Tripathi & Sankaran, 2022) – India
- Siamspinops formosensis (Kayashima, 1943) – Taiwan
- Siamspinops spinescens Dankittipakul & Corronca, 2009 – Malaysia
- Siamspinops spinosissimus Dankittipakul & Corronca, 2009 (type) – Thailand
- Siamspinops spinosus Dankittipakul & Corronca, 2009 – Thailand
- Siamspinops yejiei Wang, Gan & Mi, 2023 – China
