= Deori language =

Tibeto-Burman language spoken in northeastern India

Deori
- Deuri
- দেউৰী
- Native to: India
- Region: Assam, Arunachal Pradesh
- Ethnicity: Deori
- Native speakers: 32,376 (2011 census)
- Language family: Sino-Tibetan: Tibeto-Burman; Central Tibeto-Burman (?); Sal; Boro-Garo; Deori
- Writing system: Assamese script; Latin

Language codes
- ISO 639-3: der
- Glottolog: deor1238
- ELP: Deori
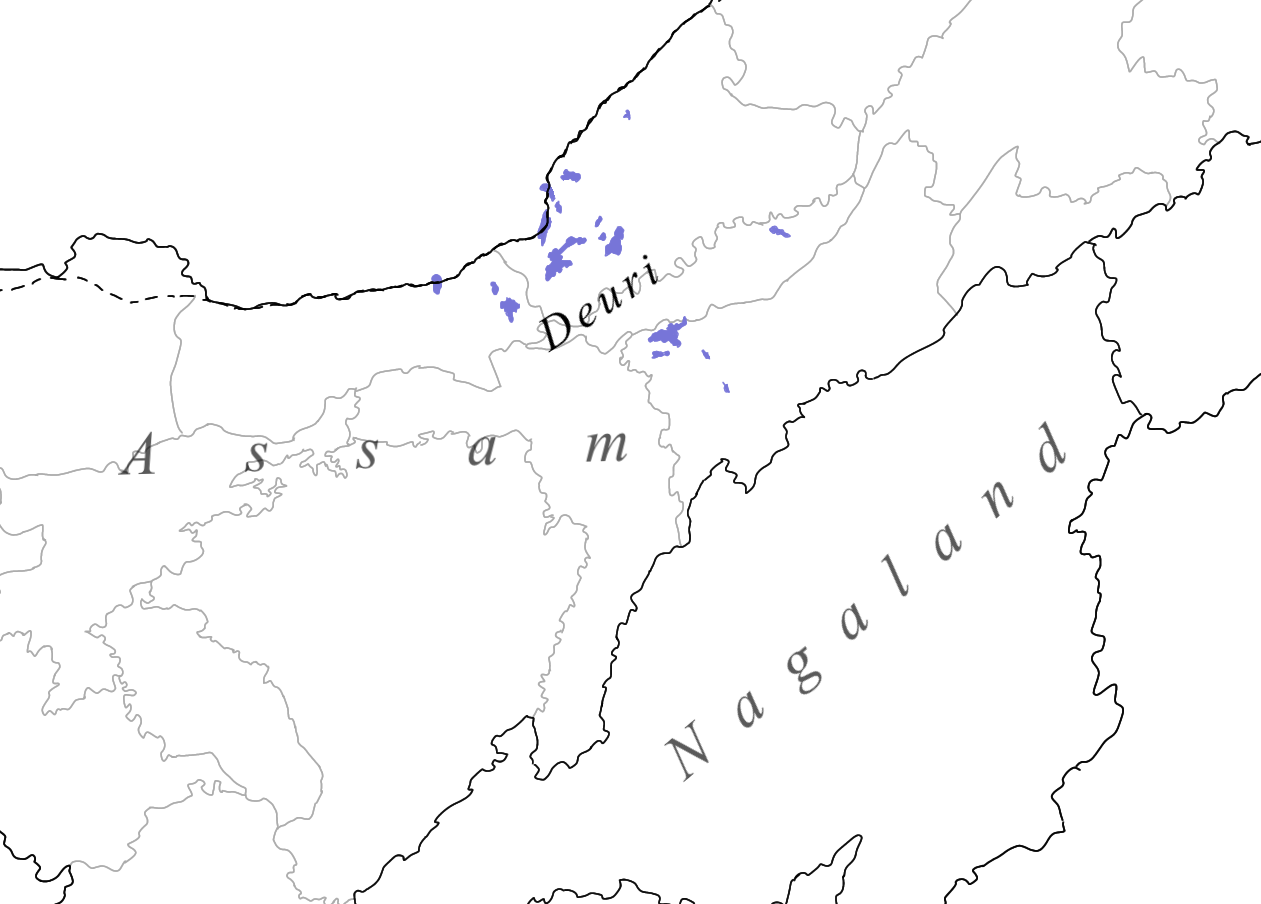
- Map of where the Deuri language is spoken

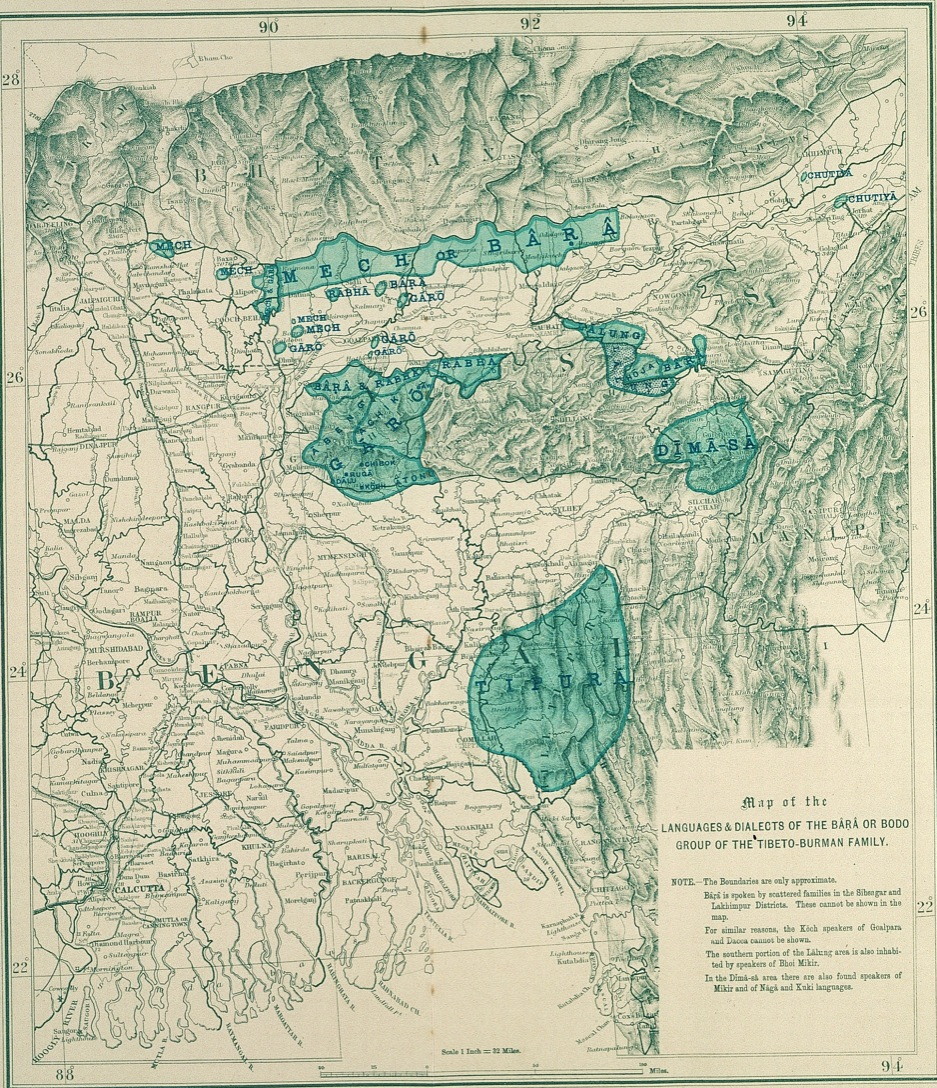
- Distribution of Deori-Chutiya Language in Upper Assam, as reported in the Language Survey of India 1903

Deori (also Deuri) is a Tibeto-Burman language in the Tibeto-Burman languages family spoken by the Deori people of Assam and Arunachal Pradesh. Deori are also a part of Bodo–Kachari people. Among the four territorial groups only the Dibongiya have retained the language. The others—Patorgoyan, Tengaponiya, and Borgoyan—have shifted to Assamese. It is spoken in Lohit district of Arunachal Pradesh, and in Lakhimpur, Dhemaji, Tinsukia, Sivasagar and Jorhat districts of Assam. The primary literary body of Deori is known as "deori chucheba chengcha" (Deori Sahitya Sabha).

In the colonial times this language became associated with the Assamese speaking Chutia people, and came to be known as the "Deori-Chutia language" in the Linguistic Survey of India. At present, there is no evidence of closeness of the Deori language to the Assamese speaking Chutia populatjon.

The Deori language is one of the most influential languages which has helped develop the Assamese language in Upper Assam.

However, the word for water has a similar form in many other languages of the Sal branch of Sino-Tibetan to which Deori belongs, so it is not conclusive evidence that Deori speakers were the first to occupy this area.

Deori Bihu dance

== Vocabulary ==
Some of the words of Deori present in Assamese derived from the dictionary Chuperemago are:

Deori word	Assamese word	Meaning
Khang	Khong	Anger
Dep-Depia	Dhep-Dhepia	Plum
Auja	Auja	Incline
Atiru	Ati	Highland
Pulunga	Pulunga	Straight
Lakia	Lekhia	Similar
Gujung	Jung	Spear
Mihiti	Mihi	Smooth
On	On	Yes
Numoi	Numoli	Little girl
Norani	Nora	Straw
Seleng	Seleng	Wrapper cloth
Dong	Dong	Irrigation Channel
Dekagu	Deka	Young man
Karisa	Kharisa	Bamboo Shoot
Bisu	Bihu	Folk Festival of Assam
Anali	Anali	Helpless
Tangan	Tangan	Beating Stick
Botar	Batar	Weather
Jakhala	Jakhala	Ladder
Hoja	Hoja	Simple
Jiyoi	Jiyori	Girl
Dokhar	Dokhar	Piece of cut off
Mena	Mena	Crooked
Habang	Hebang	Silly
Bonda	Bonda	Male cat
Ingkori	Ingkori	An insect
Seu	Seu	Habit
Meli	Meli	Unfold
Lopa	Lapha	A type of green-leafy be
Khaofi	Ufi	Dandruff
Aapa	Aapa	Father
Medali	Madoli	A type of Assamese Jewelry
Jakoi	Jakoi	Fishing tool
Khaloi	Khaloi	Basket
Dao	Daok	A type of bird
Dolong	Dolong	Bridge
Ketenga	Ketenga	Thin/Feeble
Chutuga	Chuti	Short
Huchori	Huchori	Bihu Carol
Hata	Heta	Spatula
Hajia	Hajia	Labor
Agu	Athu	Knee
Goi/Gogoi	Bhaiti	Younger Brother
Kai/kakai	Kai	Elder Brother
Habi	Habi	Forest
Jiku	Jik	Wet
Gila	Ghila	Knee cap
Eri	Eri	Eri silk
Gadu	Garu	Pillow
Hasu	Hasi	Sneeze
Hami	Hami	Yawn
Hogora	Hogora	A Deer species
Kera	Kera	Displaced eye
Keturi	Keturi	A kind of turmeric
Kekura	Kekura	Crooked
Kamu	Kami	Bamboo twig
Soru	Horu	Small
Temi	Temi	Container
Borola	Borola	Widower
Besoni	Bisoni	Handfan
Jeng	Jeng	Bush
Pei	Pehi	Paternal Aunty
Jabor	Jabor	Waste
Hapholu	Hapholu	Out hill
Kusia	Kusia	Eel
Kerketua	Kerketuwa	Squirrel
Fosola	Posola	Banana stem
Gorali	Goral	Cage
Gosok	Gosok	Trample
Ukha	Ukha	Breath
Amoto	Amothu	Heart
Suruka	Suruka	Clean
Hereka	Hereka	Tasteless
Kuduna	Khundona	Grinding pot
Takun	Takun	Stick
Jubura	Jobura	Vegetable curry
Kharoli	Kharoli	Mustard paste
Likota	Likota	Sticky
Hao	Hao	Curse
Umoni	Umoni	Incubate
Ubiriba	Uburi Huwa	Lying chest down
Sereng-sereng	Sereng-sereng	Excessive heat of sun
Robju	Robo/Roba	Wait
Ayoi	Ayoi	Painful sensation
Bega	Beng	Jump
Dep Depia	Dhep Dhepia	Plumb
Sa kuruba	Kurua	East/Sunrise
Dogia	Dhokia	Beat
Heleng-jeleng	Heleng-jeleng	Weakness
Kunga	Kunga	Crippled
Dai	Daiti	Paternal Uncle
Dati	Dati	Border area
Roina	Roina	Cleaning instrument
Pilinga	Pelenga	Boy
Kubi	Kuki	A type of Basket
Dun	Dun	Small basket
Dokora	Dokora	Wooden hammer
Hesiba	Hesa mora	Press
Hiju	Hiju	A plant
Keng keng	Kengkengoni	Yap
Isa	Risa/Riha	Wrapper cloth
Sumu	Sum	A plant
Rang-si	Rang kukur	Wild dog
Megela	Megela bon	Plum grass
Teku	Tekeli	Pot
Tokou	Tokou	A type of Palm tree
Serepa	Serepa	A type of insect

== Bibliography ==
- Acharyya, Prarthana; Mahanta, Shakuntala (2019). "Language vitality assessment of Deori: An endangered language". Language Documentation & Conservation. 13: 514–544. hdl:10125/24853. ISSN 1934-5275.
- Jaquesson, François (2017). "The linguistic reconstruction of the past: The case of the Boro-Garo languages". Linguistics of the Tibeto-Burman Area. 40 (1). Translated by van Breugel, Seino: 90–122. doi:10.1075/ltba.40.1.04van.
