= Megam language =

Sino-Tibetan language spoken in Bangladesh

Megam
- মেগাম
- Native to: Bangladesh
- Region: Mymensingh Division
- Native speakers: (6,900 cited 2000)
- Language family: Sino-Tibetan: Brahmaputran; Bodo–Garo; Garo; Megam

Language codes
- ISO 639-3: mef
- Glottolog: mega1243

Megam is one of the Garo dialects in Garo Hills and And in Khasi Hills which is a part of Sino-Tibetan language spoken in Mymensingh and in Kalmakanda subdistrict, Netrokona district, Mymensingh division, Bangladesh. It is a sub-language of Garo and it is closely related to Garo, but has been strongly influenced by Khasian languages, to the extent that it is only 7–9% lexically similar to A’being, the neighboring Garo dialect, but 60% similar to the Khasian language Lyngngam. Lyngngam are also a part of Megam tribe. Lynngam people in Khasi Hills after prolonged exposure to Khasi traditions and customs have adopted a Khasi Identity.

Some Megam People identify also as a clan and use Megam name as a Surname. Megam clan identify their surnames as Megam Sangma or Megam Momin which differs from region to region.
