= Boro–Garo languages =

Branch of Sino-Tibetan of Northeast India and Bangladesh

Boro–Garo
- Geographic distribution: Northeast India, Bangladesh
- Linguistic classification: Sino-Tibetan: Tibeto-Burman; Central Tibeto-Burman languages (?); Sal; Boro–Garo
- Subdivisions: Boro; Rabha; Garo; Koch; Deori; Dimasa; Kokborok; Tiwa

Language codes
- Glottolog: bodo1279
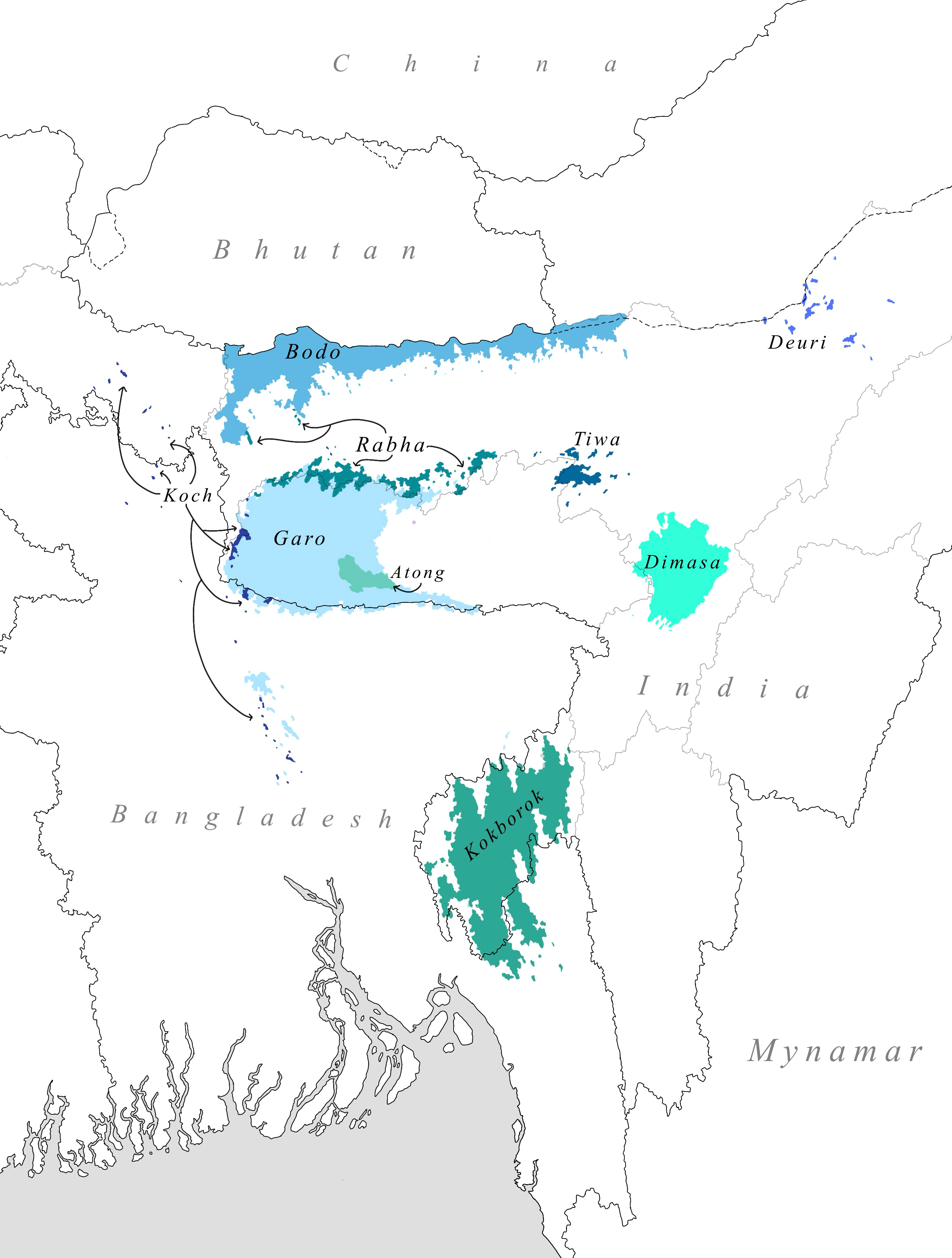
- Map of the Bodo-Garo languages

The Boro–Garo languages are a branch of Sino-Tibetan languages, spoken primarily in Northeast India and parts of Bangladesh.

The Boro–Garo languages form five groups: Boro, Rabha, Garo, Koch and Deori. Boro–Garo languages were historically very widespread throughout the Brahmaputra Valley and in what are now the northern parts of Bangladesh, and it is speculated that the proto-Boro-Garo language was the lingua franca of the Brahmaputra valley before it was replaced by Assamese, to which it has made major contributions.

== Branches ==
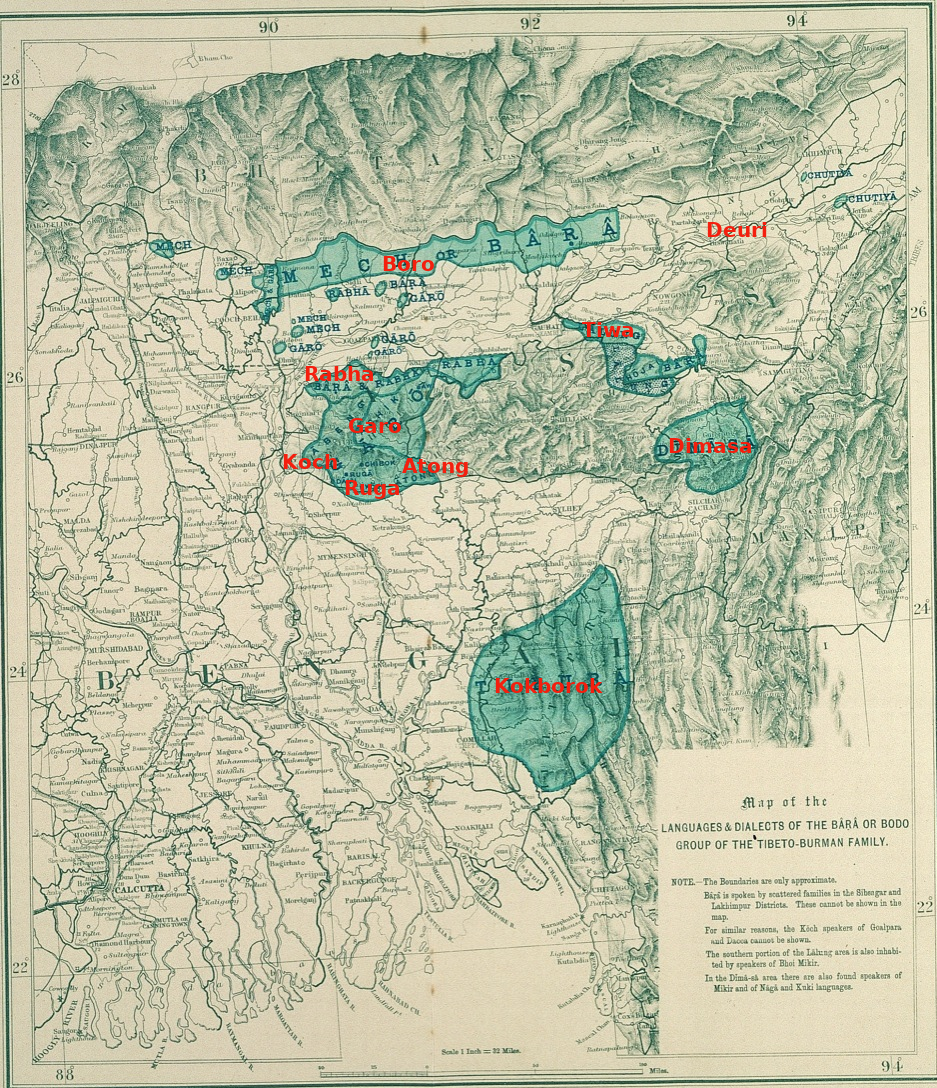
The Boro-Garo languages, as reported in the Language Survey of India 1903. The annotations are from Burling (2012) p22.

The Boro-Garo languages were identified in the Grierson's Language Survey of India, and the names of the languages and their modern equivalents are given below in the table.

Name in LSI	Modern names
Bodo	Boro
Lalung	Tiwa
Dimasa	Dimasa
Garo	Garo
Koch	Koch
Rabha	Rabha
Tripuri	Kokborok
Chutiya	Deori
Moran	Moran (since extinct)

=== Sub groups ===
The Boro-Garo languages have been further divided into four subgroups by Burling.

- Rabha (Kochic) languages: Atong, Koch, Ruga, Rabha
- Garo languages: Garo, Megam
- Bodo languages: Bodo, Dimasa, Barman, Tiwa, Kokborok (Tripuri), Kachari, Moran
- Deori language

Old Hajong may have been a Bodo–Garo language.

Barman is a recently discovered Bodo–Garo language.

Boro is an associate official language of the state of Assam. Kokborok (Tripuri) is one of the official languages of the state of Tripura. Garo is an associate official language of Meghalaya. Megam has been strongly influenced by Khasic languages, while Deori-Chutia by the Idu Mishmi language.

Languages of the family feature verb-final word order. There is some flexibility in the order of the arguments, but a nominative–accusative distinction is marked with post-nominal clitics. The languages also prefix classifiers to numerals modifying nouns. tense, aspect and mood are indicated using verbal suffixes.

== Origins ==
The linkage of the Boro–Garo languages with Konyak and Jingphaw languages suggest that proto-Boro-Garo entered Assam from somewhere to the northeast. It has been proposed that the proto-Boro-Garo language was a lingua franca of different linguistic communities, not all of who were native speakers, and that it began as a creolized lingua franca. This would account for the highly reduced morphology of Boro–Garo, with what morphology is present mostly being regular, loosely bound, and with transparent etymology, typical signs of recent origin.

== Classification ==
=== Joseph & Burling (2006) ===
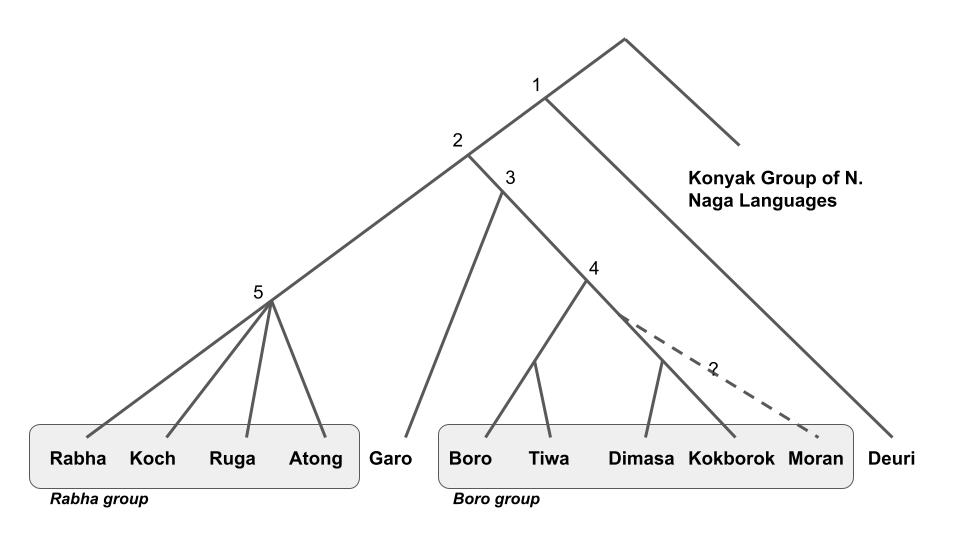
The Boro-Garo language Family Tree (Burling, 2012). Deuri, earlier erroneously called "Chutia", is the first split and is farthest from the other languages in this group. The original Boro-Garo language of the Chutia people, who currently speak Assamese, is unknown. Moran, a language belonging to the Boro group, was last recorded in the early 20th century and is no longer attested. The Rabha group is also called the Koch group. Thus, there are four sub-groups within this classification of the Boro-Garo languages: Deori, Boro, Garo and Rabha/Koch.

Joseph & Burling (2006:1-2) classify the Boro–Garo languages into four major groups. Wood (2008:6) also follows this classification.

- Deori
- Boro languages: Boro, Kokborok, Tiwa
- Garo
- Rabha (Kochic) languages: Koch, Rabha, Wanang, Atong, and Ruga

=== Jacquesson (2006) ===
Jacquesson (2017:112) classifies the Boro-Garo languages as follows, and recognizes three major branches (Western, Central, and Eastern). The Koch languages and Garo are grouped together as Western Boro-Garo.

- Western
  - Garo,
  - Rabha, Koch
- Central
  - Boro, Mech
  - Kaubru
  - Dimasa, Moran
  - Kokborok
- Eastern
  - Deori

Jacquesson (2017) believes that the Boro–Garo languages had arrived in their present location from the southeast, and notes similarities shared with Zeme languages and Kuki-Chin languages.

== Reconstruction ==
Proto-Boro–Garo has been reconstructed by Joseph and Burling (2006) and by Wood (2008).

== See also ==
- List of Proto-Boro-Garo reconstructions (Wiktionary)
- Reang
