= Sarania Kachari =

Sarania Kachari

Regions with significant populations
- Lower Assam

Languages
- Assamese

Religion
- Hinduism

Related ethnic groups
- Boro people

The Sarania Kachari is an ethnic community in the state of Assam, Northeast India. Members of this community are mostly found in the districts of Kamrup (Metro), Kamrup (Rural), Nalbari, Baksa, Tamulpur, Udalguri, Darrang, Barpeta, Bajali and Bongaigoan. Sarania is a category in the tribe-caste continuum of Assamese society. Scholars have identified an instance of this process taking place in Boroma area in the erstwhile Nalbari district in the late 19th century, where a section of Kachari population were assimilated into the Assamese society. The notable surnames used by the community are Sarania, Das, Deka, Choudhury, Medhi, Hazarika etc.

== Notable people ==
- Naba Kumar Saraniya, Indian Politician, Former Member of Parliament, Lok Sabha
- Mrigen Sarania, Mayor of Guwahati Municipal Corporation
