= Garo language =

Sino-Tibetan language of India and Bangladesh

Garo
- A·chikku
- Native to: India and Bangladesh
- Region: Meghalaya, Assam, Bangladesh
- Ethnicity: Garo
- Native speakers: 1,145,323 (2011)
- Language family: Sino-Tibetan: Tibeto-Burman; Central Tibeto-Burman (?); Sal; Bodo-Garo; Garo; Garo
- Dialects: Am·beng, A·we ba A·kawe, Matchi, Matchi-Dual, Matabeng ba Matjangchi, Gara-Ganching, Chisak, Atong, Ruga, Me·gam ba Lyngam, Chibok, Kamrup, Atiagra,
- Writing system: Latin script A-Chik Tokbirim

Official status
- Official language in: India: Meghalaya

Language codes
- ISO 639-3: grt
- Glottolog: garo1247
- ELP: Garo
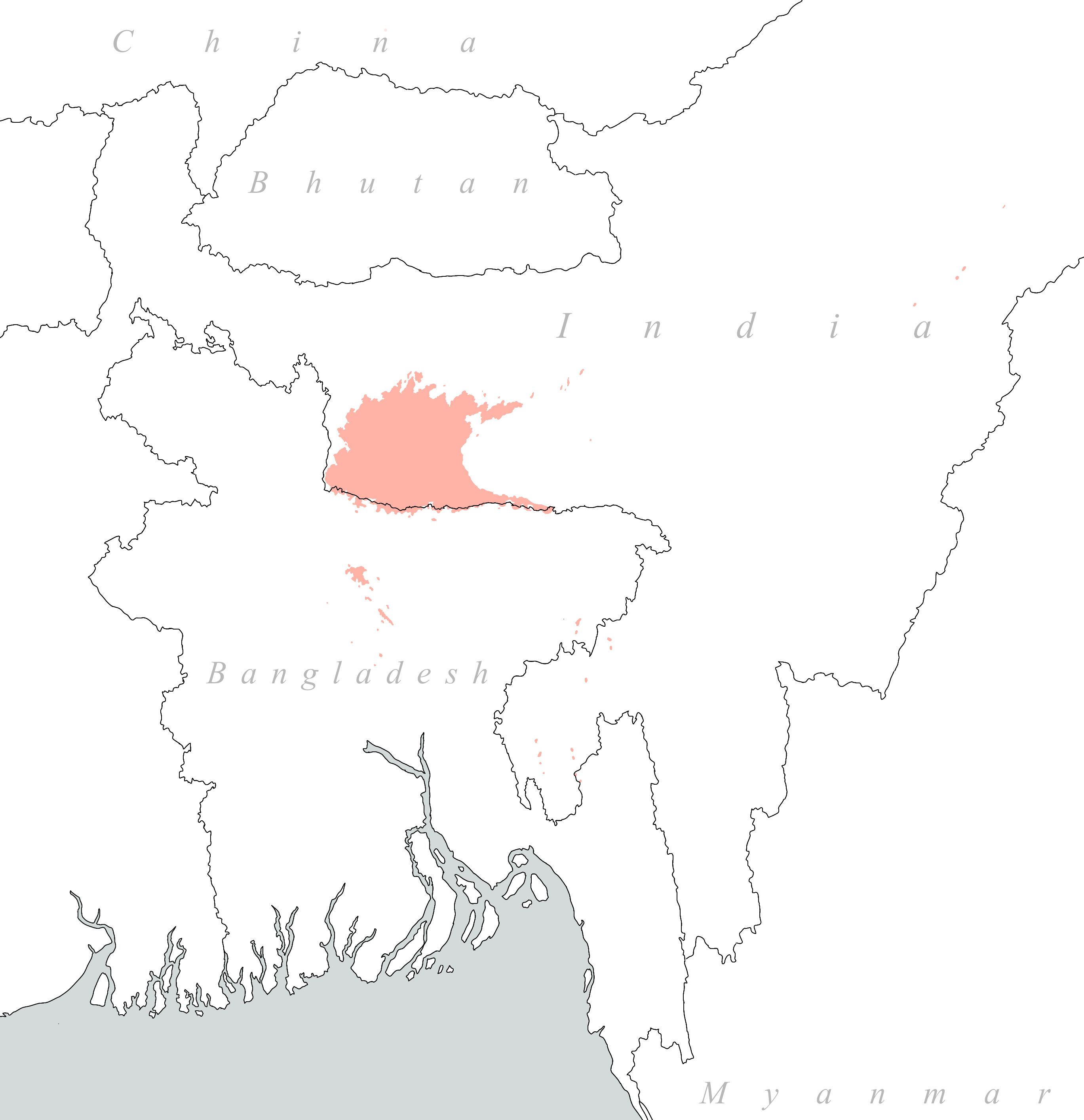
- Map of Garo speaking areas

- Garo is classified as Vulnerable by the UNESCO Atlas of the World's Languages in Danger

Garo, also referred to by its endonym A·chikku, is a Tibeto-Burman language spoken in the Northeast Indian states of Meghalaya, Assam, and Tripura. It is also spoken in certain areas of the neighbouring Bangladesh. It has associate official status in some districts within Meghalaya since 2005 and became a full-fledged official language of the state in 2026. According to the 2001 census, there are about 889,000 Garo speakers in India alone; another 130,000 are found in Bangladesh.

== Geographical distribution ==
Ethnologue lists the following locations for Garo:

- Garo Hills division, Meghalaya
- Goalpara district, Kamrup district, Sivasagar, Karbi Anglong district, western Assam
- Kohima district, Nagaland
- Udaipur subdivision, South Tripura district, Tripura
- Kamalpur and Kailasahar subdivisions, North Tripura district, Tripura
- Sadar subdivision, West Tripura district, Tripura
- Jalpaiguri district and Koch Bihar district, West Bengal
- Mymensingh district, Tangail, Jamalpur, Sherpur, Netrokona, Gazipur, Sunamgonj, Sylhet, Moulvibazar, Dhaka, Gazipur, Bangladesh

Garo elderly man sings traditional song in Bangladesh (video with subtitles in Bengali and translation in English)

== Linguistic affiliation ==
Garo belongs to the Baric group, a member of the Tibeto-Burmese subgroup of the Sino-Tibetan language family. The Boro-Garo subgroup is one of the longest recognised and most coherent subgroups of the Sino-Tibetan language family. This includes languages such as Garo language, Boro, Kokborok, Dimasa, Rabha, Atong, Tiwa, and Koch. Being closely related to each other, these languages have many features in common; similarities are easily recognisable from a surface-level observation of a given dataset of words from these languages.

== Orthography and standardisation ==
Towards the end of the 19th century, American Baptist missionaries put the north-eastern dialect of Garo called A·we into writing, initially using the Bengali script. It was selected out of many others because the north-eastern region of Garo Hills was where rapid growth in the number of educated Garo people was taking place. In addition, the region was also where education was first imparted to the Garos. In course of time, the dialect became associated with educated culture. Today, a variant of the dialect can be heard among the speakers of Tura, a small town in the west-central part of Garo Hills, which is actually an Am·beng-speaking region. The political headquarters was established in Tura after Garo Hills came under the complete control of the British Government in 1873. This led to the migration of educated north-easterners to the town, and a shift from its use of the native dialect to the dialect of the north-easterners. Tura also became the educational hub of Garo Hills, and in time, a de facto standard developed from the north-eastern dialect (A·we) which gradually became associated with the town and the educated Garo speech everywhere ever since. As regards Garo orthography, the basic Latin alphabet completely replaced the Bengali script only by 1924, although a Latin-based alphabet was developed by American missionaries in 1902.

The Latin-based Garo alphabet used today consists of 20 letters and a raised dot called raka (a symbol representing the glottal stop [ʔ]). In typing, the raka is represented by an interpunct. The letters ⟨f, q, v, x, y, z⟩ are not considered to be part of the alphabet and appear only in borrowed words. There are two ways in which the alphabet ⟨i⟩ is pronounced: one is /i/ (usually in the word-final position), while the other is the centralised vowel /ɨ/ (usually in the word-initial and word medial position). Therefore, although Garo may morphologically possess five vowels, phonetically, it actually has six.

In Bangladesh, a variant of the Bengali script is still used alongside its Latin counterpart. Bengali and Assamese had been the mediums of instruction in educational institutions until 1924, and they have played a great role in the evolution of modern Garo. As a result, many Bengali and Assamese words have entered the Garo lexicon. Recently there has also been a proliferation of English words entering everyday Garo speech, owing to media and the preference of English-medium schools over those conducted in the vernacular. Hindi vocabulary is also making a slow but firm appearance in the language.

The Garo language is sometimes written using the A·chik Tokbirim script, which was invented in 1979 by Arun Richil Marak. The names of each letter in this script were taken from natural phenomena. The script is used to some extent in the village of Bhabanipur in northwestern Bangladesh, and is also known as A·chik Garo Tokbirim.

== Dialects ==
Accordingly, the term dialect is politically defined as a 'non-official speech variety'. The Garo language comprises dialects such as A·we, Am·beng/A·beng, Matchi, Dual, Chisak, Ganching, and a few others. Marak (2013:134–135) lists the following dialects of Garo and their geographical distributions.

- The A·tong dialect is spoken in the South East of Garo Hills in the Simsang river valley. The majority of Atong speakers are concentrated in villages like Rongsu, Siju, Rongru A·sim, Badri, Chitmang, Nongal
- The Ruga dialect is spoken in a small area in the South Central part of Garo Hills in the Bugai river valley. Like Atong, Ruga is close to Koch and Rabha languages, and also to Atong than to the language of most Garos, but the shift to A·we and A·beng has gone farther along the Rugas than among the Atongs.
- The Chibok occupy the upper ridges of the Bugai River.
- The Me·gam occupy roughly the border between the Garo Hills and Khasi Hills.
- The Am·beng dialect is spoken in a large area beginning from the west of Bugai River, Ranggira plateau to the valley in the west and north. It is spoken across the boundaries in Bangladesh and south and north bank of Assam.
- A·we is spoken in a large stretch of the Brahmaputra valley roughly from Agia, Goalpara, to Doranggre, Amjonga to the border of Kamrup.
- The Matabeng dialect which is as almost similar to Am.beng dialect. It is found in the Arbella plateau, Dumindikgre, Rongwalkamgre, Chidekgre, Sanchonggre, Babadamgre, Rongram, Asanang etc.
- Gara Ganching is spoken in the southern part of Garo Hills. Gara Ganching speakers have settled in the Dareng and Rompa river valley.
- Dual is spoken in Sibbari, Kapasipara villages in the valley of the Dareng River. These villages are situated in the southern part of Garo Hills. Some Dual speakers also have settled in the villages of Balachanda and Chandakona in the western foothills of Garo Hills.
- The Matchi-Dual dialect is spoken in the Williamnagar area, in the Simsang valley. This dialect is a mixture of Matchi and Dual dialects.
- The Kamrup dialect is spoken in the villages of Gohalkona, Hahim, Santipur, and Ukiam in Kamrup District.

Speakers of these dialects can generally understand one another, although there are occasions where one who is unfamiliar with a dialect from another region requires explanation of certain words and expressions typical of that dialect. Research on the dialects of Garo, with the exception of A·we and Am·beng, is very much neglected. Many Garo dialects are being subsumed by either the Standard or A·we or Am·beng. Although the de facto written and spoken standard grew out of A·we, they are not one and the same; there is marked variation in the intonation and the use of vocabulary between the two. It would be proper, therefore, to make a distinction between Standard A·we (spoken mainly in Tura) and Traditional A·we (still heard among the speakers in the north-eastern region of Garo Hills). There is also a great misconception among Garos regarding Atong, Ruga, and Me·gam. These languages are traditionally considered dialects of Garo. The speakers of Atong and Ruga languages are indeed Garos, ethnically; but their languages lack mutual intelligibility with the dialects of Garo and therefore linguistically distinct from the Garo language. Me∙gam people are ethnically Garo but Me.gam people of Khasi Hills has been influenced by Khasi language and hence the Me.gam of Khasi Hills is linguistically similar to Khasi.

== Garo words ==
Greetings and wishes

- Namenga ma?: 'How are you?'
- Namengaba: 'I'm fine, okay'
- Pringnam: 'Good morning'
- Walnam: 'Good night'
- Attamnam: 'Good afternoon'
- Ang·a nang·na ka·saa, Anga nang·na ka·sara: 'I love you'
- Na·a bachi re·angenga?: 'Where are you going?'
- Anga Tura china re·angenga: 'I'm going to Tura'
- Mi cha·jok ma?: 'Have you eaten rice?'
- Anga mi cha·aha, cha·jok: 'I have eaten rice'

Family

- Ama: 'mother'
- Apa: 'father'
- Ada: Elder brother
- Awang (Father's younger brother): 'uncle'
- Ade (Mother's younger sister): 'aunt'
- Mama (Mother's male siblings): 'uncle'
- Atchu, bude: 'grandfather'
- Ambi, bitchi: 'grandmother'
- Abi: 'elder sister'
- Ano, nono: 'younger sister'
- Angjong, jojong: 'younger brother'

Astronomy and meteorology

- Sal: 'sun'
- Jajong: 'moon'
- Aski: 'stars'
- Aram: 'sky, clouds'
- Balwa: 'wind, air'
- Mikka: 'rain'
- Salgi: Sky or Heaven

== Status ==
In 1996, at the inception of its Tura campus, the North-Eastern Hill University established a Department of Garo. It claims to be “the only one of its kind in the world”. The department offers M.A. and Ph.D. programs in Garo.

== Numbers ==
1. Sa

2. Gni

3. Gittam

4. Bri

5. Bonga

6. Dok

7. Sni

8. Chet

9. Sku

10. Chiking, chikung

11. Chi sa

12. Chi gni

13. Chi gittam

14. Chi bri

15. Chi bonga

16. Chi dok

17. Chi sni

18. Chi chet

19. Chi sku

20. Kol grik

=== Nouns ===
Garo is a subject–object–verb (SOV) language, which means that verbs will usually be placed at the end of a sentence. Any noun phrases will come before the verb phrases.

==== Casing ====
All nouns in Garo can be inflected for a variety of grammatical cases. Declension of a noun can be done by using specific suffixes:

Case	Garo suffix	Example with bol	Translation
Nominative	—	Ia bol dal·gipa ong·a.	This tree is big.
Accusative	-ko	Anga bolko nika.	I see the tree.
Genitive	-ni	Bolni bijakrang ga·akenga.	The tree's leaves are falling.
Dative	-na	Anga bolna aganaha.	I talked to the tree.
Locative	-o/-chi (-chi is only used to refer to space; bolchi 'in the tree' would be valid, but walchi 'in the night' would not)	Bolo/Bolchi makre mangbonga ong·a.	There are five monkeys in the tree.
Instrumental	-chi	Anga ruachi bolko den·aha.	I cut the tree with an axe.
Comitative	-ming	Anga bolming dongaha.	I stayed with the tree.

Some nouns naturally end in a vowel. When declining the nouns into a non-nominative case, the final vowel is typically removed: e.g. do·o 'bird' will become do·ni when declined into the genitive case.

Additionally, casing suffixes can also be combined. -o and -na combine to form -ona, which means 'towards' (lative case). -o and -ni combine to form -oni, which means 'from' (ablative case). An example usage could be Anga Turaoni Shillong-ona re·angaha, which means 'I traveled from Tura to Shillong'.

==== Pronouns ====
Garo has pronouns for first, second, and third person in both singular and plural, much like in English. Garo also considers clusivity and has two separate first-person plural pronouns for both inclusive we and exclusive we. However, Garo does not consider grammatical gender, and has one pronoun for third person singular. The following table displays the subjective inflection of each pronoun (i.e. when the pronoun is used as subject).

		singular	plural
1st person	exclusive	anga	an·ching
1st person	inclusive	anga	chinga
2nd person		na·a	na·simang
3rd person		ua	uamang

In written Garo, bia is often replaced with ua, which literally means 'that' in English.

In the Am·beng dialect, an·ching is na·ching, and na·simang and uamang are na·song and bisong, respectively.

Prounouns can also be declined as other nouns. One exception is na·a. When declined, the stem noun becomes nang·. 'Your' translated to Garo would be nang·ni.

=== Verbs ===
Verbs in Garo are only conjugated based on the grammatical tense of the action. There are three main conjugations:

Tense	Garo suffix	Example with cha·a	Translation
Past	-aha	Mi cha·aha.	[I] ate rice.
Present	-a	Mi cha·a	[I] eat rice.
Future	-gen	Mi cha·gen.	[I] will eat rice.

However, there are a diverse range of verb suffixes that can be added to Garo verbs. Some of these suffixes include:

- Imperative mood - The second-person imperative mood is indicated with the suffix -bo.

On·a 'to give' → Angna iako on·bo 'Give me this'

- Yes–no questions - When adding the suffix -ma to the end of a verb, the clause becomes an interrogation.

Nika 'to see' → Uako nikama? 'Do you see that?'

- Infinitive - Adding -na to a verb will conjugate it into its infinitive form.

Ring·a 'to sing' → Anga ring·na namnika 'I like singing'

- Negation - To negate a verb, -ja will be added. Note that negating a verb in its future tense will yield -jawa, e.g. Anga nikgen 'I will see' → Anga nikjawa 'I will not see'

Namnika 'to like' → Namnikja 'to not like, to hate'

- Progressive aspect - The progressive aspect can be indicated using -eng.

Anga kal·a 'I play' → Anga kal·enga 'I am playing'

- Adjectives - Garo does not truly support adjectives. To modify a noun, a nominalised verb is used instead. Verb nominalising is done by using the suffix -gipa.

Dal·a 'to be big' → Dal·gipa 'the thing that is big' → Dal·gipa ro·ong 'the big rock'

== Phonology ==
=== Consonants ===
		Labial	Dental	Alveolar	Palatal	Velar	Glottal
Plosive	voiceless	p (pʰ)	t̪ (t̪ʰ)		t͡ɕ	k (kʰ)	ʔ
Plosive	voiced	b	d̪		d͡ʑ	ɡ	
Nasal		m		n		ŋ	
Fricative				s			h
Tap				ɾ			
Lateral				l			
Approximant		w			j		

- Voiceless stops /p, t̪, k/ are always aspirated in word-initial position as [pʰ, t̪ʰ, kʰ]. In word-final position, they are heard as unreleased [p̚, t̚, k̚].
- /s/ is heard as an alveolo-palatal fricative [ɕ] when occurring before front vowel sounds.
- /ɾ/ is heard as a trill [r] when occurring within consonant clusters.
- /j/ only occurs in diphthongs such as ⟨ai⟩, ⟨oi⟩, ⟨ui⟩. The ⟨j⟩ grapheme already represents /d͡ʑ/.
- /ʔ/ is represented by interpunct ⟨·⟩ or apostrophe ⟨ʼ⟩.

=== Vowels ===
	Front	Central	Back
Close	i		ɯ / u
Mid	e		o
Open		a	

The ⟨i⟩ grapheme represents both /i/ and /ɯ/. An ⟨-i-⟩ syllable that ends with a consonant other than /ʔ/ (not forming part of a consonant cluster) is pronounced [ɯ], otherwise, it is pronounced [i].

While almost all other languages in the Bodo–Garo sub-family contrast between low and high tones, Garo is one of the sole exceptions. Wood writes that instead Garo seems to have substituted the tonal system by contrasting between syllables that end in a glottal stop and those that do not, with the glottal stop replacing the low tone.

== See also ==
- Bible translations into the languages of Northeast India
- Garo people
- Garo Hills

== Other sources ==
- A-Chik Tok-Birim – Endangered Alphabets
- Breugel, Seino van. 2009. Atong-English Dictionary. Tura: Tura Book Room.
- Breugel, Seino van. 2014. A grammar of Atong. Leiden, Boston: Brill.
- Burling, Robbins and Joseph, U.V. 2006. A Comparative Phonology of Boro Garo Languages. Mysore: Central Institute of Indian Languages.
- Burling, Robbins. 2003. The Language of the Modhupur Mandi, Volume 1. Ann Arbor, MI: Michigan Publishing, University of Michigan Library
- Department of Garo, North-Eastern Hill University, Tura Campus
- SIL International. "Garo". Ethnologue, 2014
