= Rabha language =

Sino-Tibetan language

Rabha
- Rabha khurang/krwu
- Raba
- Native to: India
- Region: Assam, West Bengal, Meghalaya
- Ethnicity: Rabha people
- Native speakers: 139,986 (2011 census)
- Language family: Sino-Tibetan: Tibeto-Burman; Sal; Boro–Garo; Rabha
- Dialects: Maitori; Rongdani; Kocha
- Writing system: Assamese script, Bengali script, Latin script

Language codes
- ISO 639-3: rah
- Glottolog: rabh1238
- ELP: Rabha
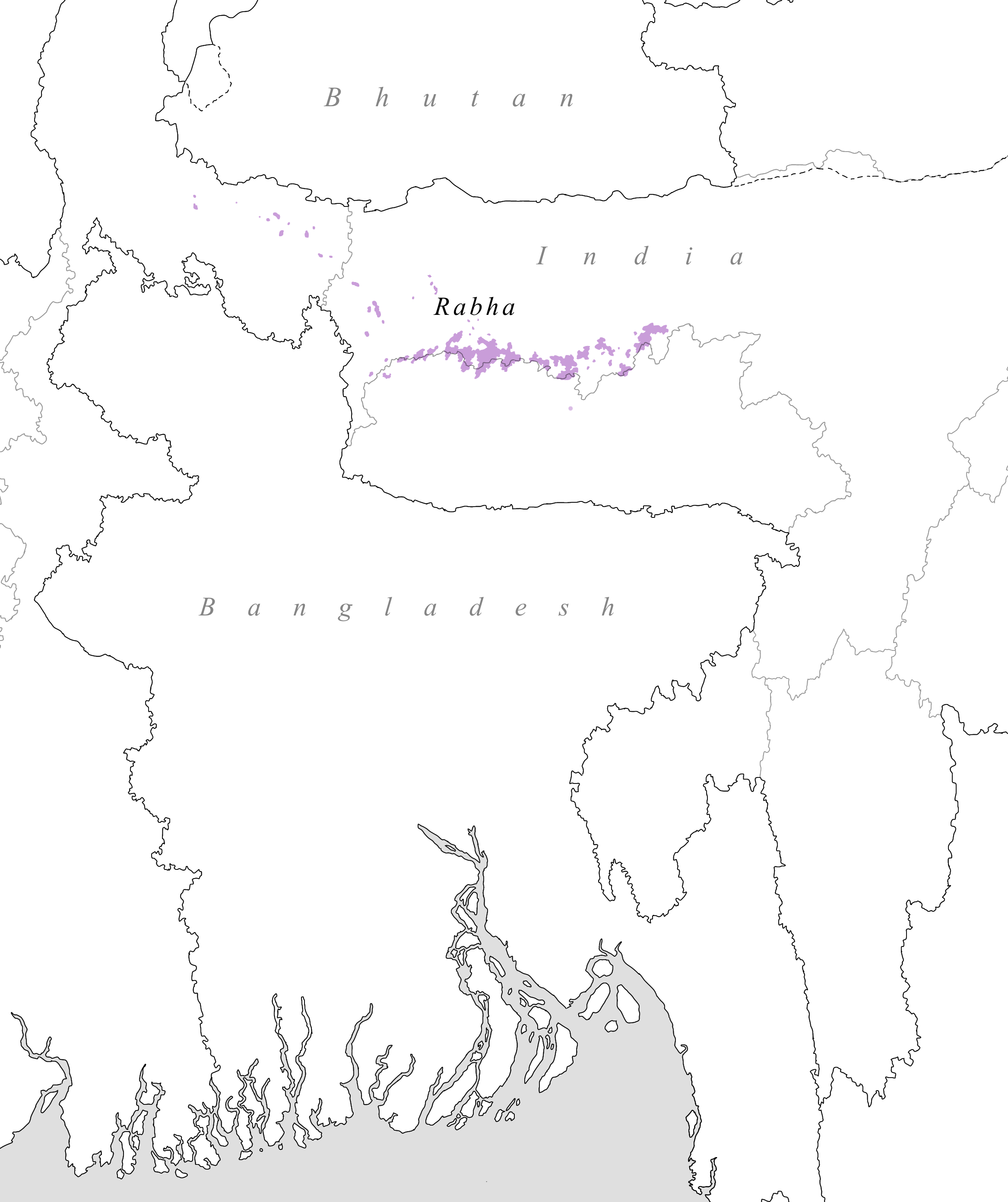
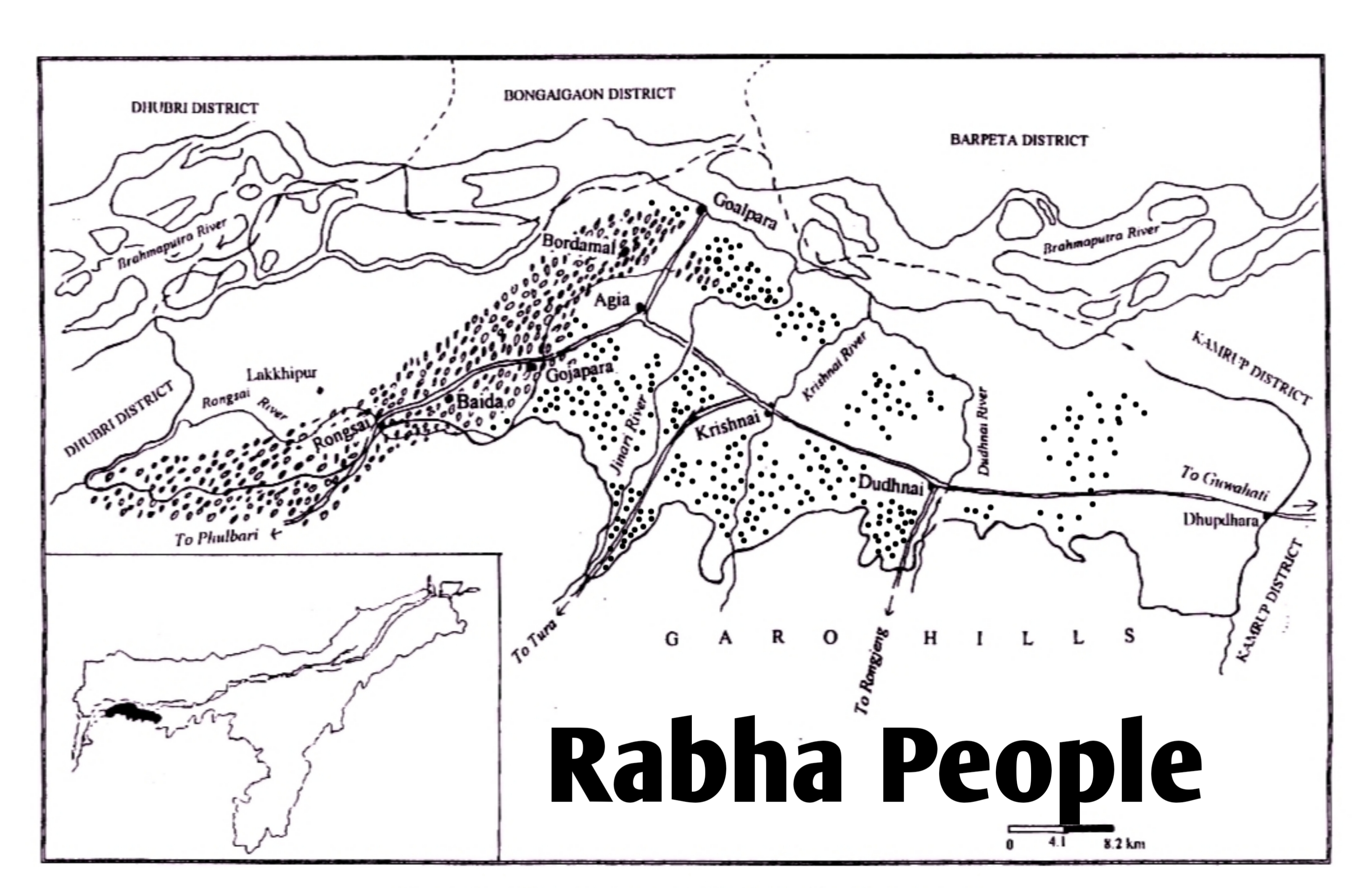
- Map of where Rabha is spoken Rabha People

Rabha is a Sino-Tibetan language of Northeast India. The two dialects, Maitori and Rongdani, are divergent enough to cause problems in communication. According to U.V. Joseph, there are three dialects, viz. Rongdani, Maitori and Kocha (page ix). Joseph writes that "the Kocha dialect, spoken along the northern bank of the Brahmaputra, is highly divergent and is not intelligible to a Rongdani or Maitori speaker" (page ix). Joseph also writes that "The dialect variations between Rongdani and Maitori, both of which are spoken on the southern bank of the Brahmaputra, in the Goalpara district of Assam and belong to the northern slopes of Meghalaya, are minimal" (pages ix-x). He concludes the paragraph on dialectal variation with: "The Rongdani-Maitori dialectal differences become gradually more marked as one moves further west" (page x).

In 2007, U.V. Joseph published a grammar of Rabha with Brill in their series Languages of the Greater Himalayan Region.

== A representation of different Rabha dialects ==
Sample question answers and some words:
| English | Rangdani | Kocha | Maitori |
|---|---|---|---|
| Hello | Srirasong | Seolawu | Urgirasong |
| What is your name ? | Nangi ata mung ? | Nini utung mung ? | Nangi ato mung? |
| My name is Rasan. | Angi mung Rasan. | wni/Ini mung Rasan. | Angi mung Rasan. |
| I | Ame/ Ang | Ang | Ang |
| You | Name/Nang | Nwng | Nang |
| What | Ata | Utung | Ato |
| Why | Atana | Atanga/Atangna | Ana |
| When | Bedo | Bisomoi/Biba/Biasai | Bedo |
| Where | Bisi/Bisina | Bibai/Bitai | Bo/Benga |
| Speak | Kani | Brak/Bot | Tep |
| Body | Kan-ganjhi | Kan | Kan |
| Hair | Khoro | Hwwr/Huru | Khorok |
| Eye | Neken | Mwkwr | Muken |
| Arm | Baha | Cwsi | Tasi |
| Sun | Rangsang | Rasan | Rangsang |
| Moon | Rangri/Ranggre | Rangret/Naret | Langri |
| Morning | Phung | Mwnwu | Phungi |
| Evening | Rangsri | Rasanlwi | Langgri |
| Noon | Dipor | Sandupur | Rangsangdupur |
| Night | Phar | Phar | Phari |
| Day | San | San | Sani |
| Tomorrow | Gaphung | Ganapo | Rebakaisani |
| Week | Satpaksa | Sopta | Sopta |
| House | Nok | Nok/No/nwgwu | Nok |
| Door | Nok | Nakab | Noko |
| Village | Song | Song | Song |
| Husband | Umba | Mi | Miba |
| Wife | Micik | Micik/Jwg | Michik |
| Rice | Mairung | Mairong | Mairun |
| Milk | Nu | Nono/Nuno | Nui |
| Oil | Thuchi | Tel | Thocha |
| Meat | Kaka | Kan | Makan |
| Sand | Hangceng | Hanceng | Hancheng |
| River | Tambrong | Chikajhora | Cikajhora |
| Goat | Pryn | Purun | Prun |
| Cow | Masu | Mwsu/Musu | Masu |
| Spider | Bibur | Barcek | Bhubur |

== A representation of different Rabha numbers ==
Numbers:
| English | Rongdani | Kocha | Maitori | Standard Rabha |
|---|---|---|---|---|
| Zero | Tha | slong | Slo | Slong |
| One | Sa | Sa | Sa | Sa |
| Two | Ning | Ning | Ning | Ning |
| Three | Tham | Tam | Tham | Tham |
| Four | Cesa | Bri | Ari | Bri |
| Five | Tola | Bwnga | Campa | Bwng |
| Six | Krop | Do / Krop | Hes | Krop |
| Seven | Siya | Sin | Sorta | Sin |
| Eight | Gin | Gin | Parta | Gin |
| Nine | Bing | suku | Pindas | Suku |
| Ten | Satha | Chi | Goda | Hasi / chi |
| Eleven | Sasa | Chisa | Godasa | sisa |
| Twelve | Saning | Chining | Godaning | sining |
| Thirteen | Satham | Chitaam | Godatham | sitham |
| Fourteen | Sacesa | Chibri | Godaari | sibri |
| Fifteen | Satola | Chibwnga | Godacampa | sibwng |
| Sixteen | Sakrob | Chikrop | Godahes | sikrop |
| Seventeen | Sasiya | Chisin | Godasorta | sisin |
| Eighteen | Sagin | Chigin | Godaparta | sigin |
| Nineteen | Sabing | Chisuku | Godapindas | sisuku |
| Twenty | Ningtha | ningchi | Rikha | Ningsi |
| Twentyone | Ningsa | ningchisa | Rikhasa | Ningsisa |
| Twentytwo | Ningning | ningchining | Rikhaning | Ningsining |
| Twentythree | Ningtham | ningchitam | Rikhatham | Ningsitham |
| Twentyfour | Ningcesa | ningchibri | Rikhaari | Ningsibri |
| Twentyfive | Ningtola | ningchibwnga | Rikhacampa | Ningsibwng |
| Twentysix | Ningkrob | ningchikrop | Rikhahes | Ningsikrop |
| Twentyseven | Ningsiya | ningchisin | Rikhasorta | Ningsisin |
| Twentyeight | Ninggin | ningchigin | Rikhaparta | Ningsigin |
| Twentynine | Ningbing | ningchisuku | Rikhapindas | Ningsisuku |
| Thirty | Thamtha | tamchi | Siri | Thamsi |
| Forty | Cesatha | brichi | Arli | Brisi |
| Fifty | Tolatha | bwngachi | Phala | Bwngsi |
| Sixty | Krobtha | kropchi | Hesti | Kropsi |
| Seventy | Siyatha | sinchi | Sorto | Sinsi |
| Eighty | Gintha | ginchi | Arsi | Ginsi |
| Ninety | Bingtha | sukuchi | Pinsip | Sukusi |
| Hundred | sathatha | sosa | Gota | So |
| Twohundred | Ningthatha | soning | Gotaning | Soning |
| Threehundred | Thamthatha | sotam | Gotatham | Sotham |
| Fourhundred | Cesathatha | sobri | Gotaari | Sobri |
| Fivehundred | Tolathatha | sobwnga | Gotaphala | Sobwng |
| Sixhundred | Krobthatha | sokrop | Gotahesti | Sokrop |
| Sevenhundred | Siyathatha | sosin | Gotasorto | Sosin |
| Eighthundred | Ginthatha | sogin | Gotaarsi | Sogin |
| Ninehundred | Bingthatha | sosuku | Gotapinsip | Sosuku |
| Thousand | Satha³ | sochi | Hajar | Sohasi |

== Geographical distribution ==
According to the Ethnologue, Rabha is spoken in the following areas of India.

- Darrang district, Goalpara district, and Kamrup district, western Assam
- Nagaland
- Jalpaiguri district and Alipurduar district, West Bengal
- Tufanganj subdivision, Koch Bihar district
- East Garo Hills district and West Garo Hills district, Meghalaya

 There are also 1,600 Rabha in 9 districts of Bhutan.[4]

== See also ==
- Rabha people
- Rabha Hasong Autonomous Council
- Rabha Baptist Church Union
