= Koch language =

Sal (Sino-Tibetan) language spoken in India and Bangladesh

Koch
- Native to: India, Bangladesh
- Ethnicity: Koch
- Native speakers: 36,434 (2011)
- Language family: Sino-Tibetan: Tibeto-Burman?; Central?; Sal; Boro-Garo; Kochic; Koch

Language codes
- ISO 639-3: kdq
- Glottolog: koch1250
- ELP: Koch
- Pani Koch (= Banai, Wanang)
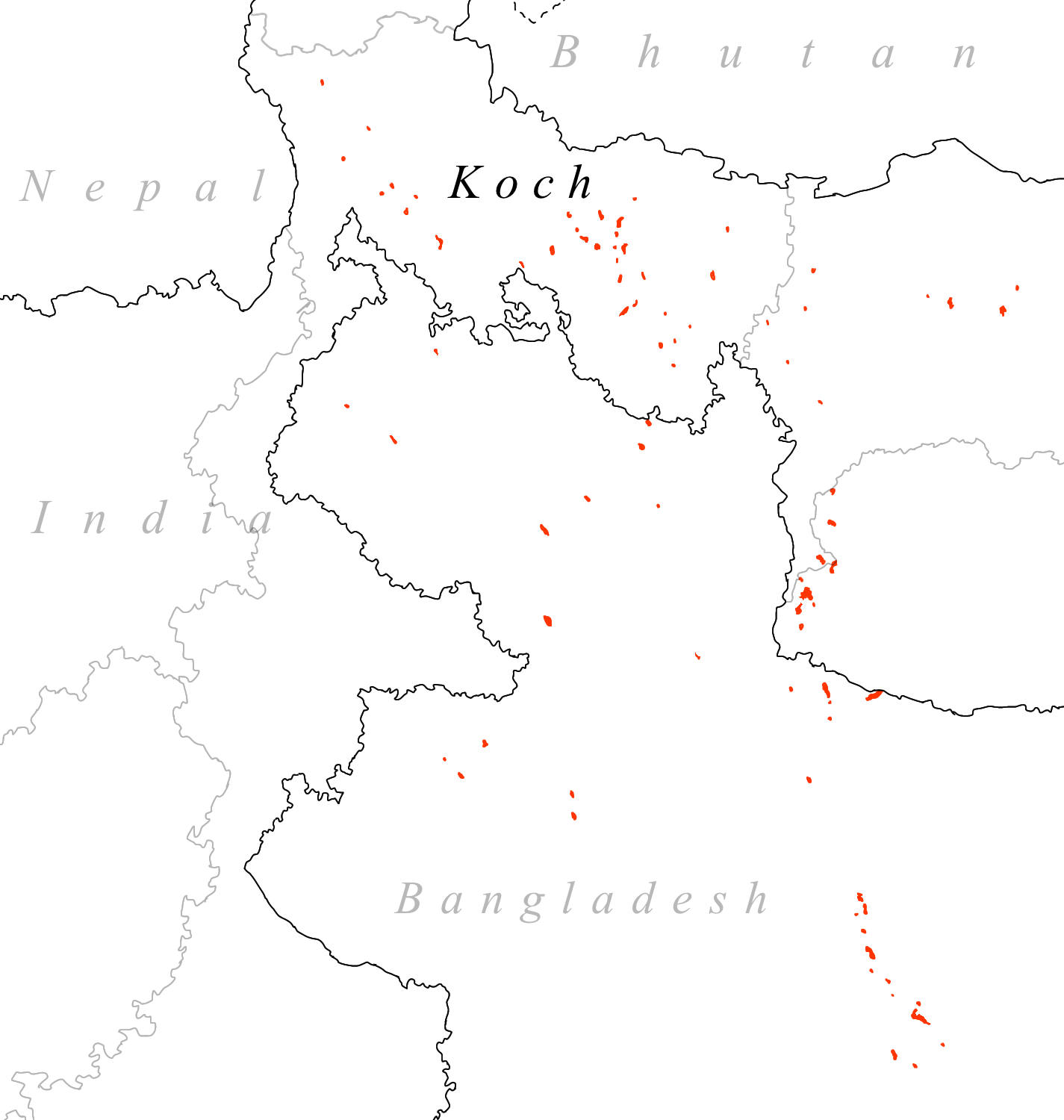
- Map of the Koch language

Koch is a Sino-Tibetan language spoken by the Koch people of India and Bangladesh. It is primarily spoken in the Indian states of Meghalaya and Lower Assam and in the northern parts of the country Bangladesh, where it serves as a major means of communication among the Koches. Koch language is written with Assamese, Bengali, Roman scripts.

There is an organization Koch Krorang Mathop in Tura, Meghalaya which publishes Koch materials, such as books, an annual Koch magazine. Koch Development Forum is also working on the promotion of the Koch language among the Koch people who have now switched their language to Indo-Aryan languages.

The state of Assam in Koch :

Kocho koro	Assamese
O' ani apani hadam O' ani pelemsa hadam Edeghenek kanchikni edeghenek thaini edeghenek nasini hadam. O' ani kanchikni hurang Asameni thaoni hurang Eh haye lami mung bongni Oten liya jhuchai mung. O' ani bongni thane O' ani nasini ame Chai lana ang Nani mahango Hapaka fungchanane.	অ' মোৰ আপোনাৰ দেশ অ' মোৰ চিকুণী দেশ এনেখন শুৱলা, এনেখন সুফলা এনেখন মৰমৰ দেশ। অ' মোৰ সুৰীয়া মাত অসমৰ সুৱদী মাত পৃথিৱীৰ ক'তো বিচাৰি জনমটো নোপোৱা কৰিলেও পাত। অ' মোৰ ওপজা ঠাই অ' মোৰ অসমী আই চাই লওঁ এবাৰ মুখনি তোমাৰ হেঁপাহ মোৰ পলোৱা নাই।

Sample text: ^{Article 4 of the human rights Act}
English	^{koch} In Latin script	^{koch} In Bengali-Assamese script
All human beings are born free and equal in dignity and rights. They are endowed with reason and conscience and should act towards one another in a spirit of brotherhood.	Habongni hisape bebak morota rasong aro adhikar wai soman aro jokni. Orongni prengni aro chotta towa. Orong sopan sopanna ada-ajong ghenek bebohar hawni se usit dowa.	হাবঙনি হিছাপে বেবাক মৰতা ৰাছঙ আৰ' আধিকাৰ ৱাই ছমান আৰ' জক্নি।অৰঙনি প্ৰেঙনি আৰ' চত্তা তৱা।অৰঙ ছপান ছপান্না আদা-আজঙ ঘেনেক বেবহাৰ হাৱনি ছে উছিত দৱা।

== Dialects ==
The Koch language is currently represented by five surviving dialects, which are as follows:

1. Wanang
2. Tintikiya
3. Harigaya
4. Chapra and
5. Margan

Main Kochese is ( Wanang koch )

== Short representation of the various dialects: ==
Sample question and answer:
English	Koch ^{Harigaya}	Koch ^{Tintikiya}	Koch ^{Wanang}
What is your name?	Nani ata mung?	Nani bita mung?	Nani atõ mung?
My name is xyz.	Ani mung Xyz.	Ani mung Xyz.	Ani mung Xyz.

Numbers:
English	Koch ^{Harigaya}	Koch ^{Tintikiya}	Koch ^{Wanang}
Zero	Era	Ba	Riyaa
One	Sa	Go	Godsa
Two	Ning	Ma	Nangning
Three	Tam	Kol	Metam
Four	Bri	Homa	Bri
Five	Bõng	Maji	Peisa
Six	Krõp	Pachang	Krob
Seven	Sin	Urdek	Sin
Eight	Gin	Nigra	Bin
Nine	Gis	Difu	Gind
Ten	Cha	Bachak	Dong

== Geographical distribution ==
Koch is spoken in:

- Assam:
  - Baksa district - Hodi or Koch Mandai
  - Bongaigaon district - Madaci Koch, Koch
  - Darrang district - Hodi or Koch Mandai
  - Dhemaji district - Hodi or Koch Mandai
  - Dhubri district - Madaci Koch, Koch
  - Goalpara district - Madaci koch, Kocho koro, Hodi or Koch Mandai
  - Kokrajhar district - Madaci Koch, Koch
  - Lakhimpur district - Hodi or Koch Mandai
  - Nagaon district - Hodi or Koch Mandai, Kocho koro
  - Udalguri district - Hodi or Koch Mandai
  - Sonitpur district - Hodi or Koch Mandai
  - South Salmara district - Hodi or Koch Mandai, Koch
- Bangladesh: Hodi or Koch Mandai and Kocho koro
- Meghalaya:
  - East Khasi Hills district - Hodi alias Koch Mandai
  - West Garo Hills district - Koch
- Tripura: Hodi or Koch Mandai or koch
