= Hajong language =

Indo-Aryan language

Hajong
- হাজং
- "Hajong" in Bengali-Assamese script
- Pronunciation: [ha.dʑɔŋ]
- Native to: India and Bangladesh
- Region: Meghalaya, Assam, Mizoram, Arunachal Pradesh and West Bengal in India Mymensingh, Sherpur, Netrokona and Sunamganj in Bangladesh
- Ethnicity: Hajong
- Native speakers: 80,000 (2011–2022)
- Language family: Indo-European: Indo-Iranian; Indo Aryan; Eastern; Bengali–Assamese; Hajong
- Dialects: Doskani rao; Korebari rao; Susung rao; Barohajari rao; Mespara rao
- Writing system: Bengali-Assamese script, Latin script

Language codes
- ISO 639-3: haj
- Glottolog: hajo1238

Hajong is an Indo-Aryan language variety spoken by the Hajong people. It is a Bengali-based creole with a possible Tibeto-Burman language substratum. It is spoken by approximately 80,000 ethnic Hajongs across the northeast of the Indian subcontinent, specifically in the states of Assam, Meghalaya, Arunachal Pradesh, and West Bengal in present-day India, and the divisions of Mymensingh and Sylhet in present-day Bangladesh. It is written in Bengali-Assamese script and Latin script. It has many Sanskrit loanwords. The Hajongs originally spoke a Tibeto-Burman language, but it later mixed with Assamese and Bengali.

== Old Hajong ==
The language now spoken by the Hajong people may be considered an Indo-Aryan language because of language shift from a Tibeto-Burman language. Old Hajong or Khati Hajong may have been related to Garo, of Tibeto-Burman origin.

== Variations ==
The Hajong Language varies within the clans because of regional variations. There are five notable clans of the Hajong people.

- Doskinw
- Korebaryw
- Susungyw
- Barohazaryw
- Miespwryw

== Writing system ==
The Hajong language is written by using both the Latin and the Bengali scripts. Although both scripts are used in India, the Hajongs in Bangladesh expect to use the Bengali script since most education is in Bengali medium. However, Hajongs living in Dhemaji and surrounding areas use Assamese script. In each script, there is one added unique symbol for the close back unrounded vowel /ɯ/. In Latin script, it is written with "w" and in the Eastern Nagari script with "অৗ" at the end of a syllable.

== Phonology ==
Hajong has 23 consonant phonemes, 8 vowel phonemes, and 2 approximants that have some characteristics of consonants: /w/ and /j/ act as diphthongs. The vowel phonemes are /a/, /i/, /u/, /e/, /ɛ/, /o/, /ɔ/ and /ɯ/ (close, back, unrounded). Unlike other Indo-Aryan languages, Hajong language has only one 'i' and 'u'. It is somewhat ambiguous whether the final vowel is a phoneme or an allophone of [a] in the environment of other close vowels. The extra vowel /ɯ/ does not occur in other Indo-Aryan languages but is typical for the Tibeto-Burman family. Codas j and ch in the final position of a syllable turns into an s sound. Hajong includes some vowel harmony and the devoicing of final consonants.

Consonants
			Labial	Dental, Alveolar	Palatal	Velar	Glottal
Nasal			m	n		ŋ	
Plosive/ Affricate	voiceless	unaspirated	p	t	tɕ	k	
Plosive/ Affricate	voiceless	aspirated	pʰ	tʰ	tɕʰ	kʰ	
Plosive/ Affricate	voiced	unaspirated	b	d	dʑ	ɡ	
Plosive/ Affricate	voiced	aspirated	bʱ	dʱ	dʑʱ	ɡʱ	
Fricative	voiceless			s			h
Fricative	voiced			(z) (Note: The /z/ sound in Hajong only occurs when a word ending with /s/ is followed by case markers beginning with a vowel.)			
Tap				ɾ			
Lateral				l			
Approximant			w		j		

Vowels
	Front	Central	Back
Close	i ⟨i⟩		ɯ ⟨w⟩, u ⟨u⟩
Close-mid	e ⟨ei⟩		o ⟨ou⟩
Open-mid	ɛ ⟨e⟩		ɔ ⟨o⟩
Open		ä ⟨a⟩	

Vowels play an important role in changing the meaning of words and the grammatical structure of sentences. Unlike in most other Indo-Aryan languages like Assamese and Bengali, Hajong has no distinction between longer and shorter /i/ and /u/. The Assamese script lacks some vowels unique to Hajong phonology, which is gradually leading to a vowel shift. Since vowels play an important role in Hajong grammar, the grammatical structure is also changing.

== Grammar ==
Hajong primarily has a canonical word order of subject–object–verb, and the subject, object, and verb of a sentence appear or usually appear in that order. Hajong has a strong tendency to use postpositions, rather than prepositions; to place auxiliary verbs after the action verb; to place genitive noun phrases before the possessed noun; and to have subordinators appear at the end of subordinate clauses.

Hajong is an agglutinative language in which words are often combined and compressed, and there is often no pause between words of a sentence.

Even though it is considered an Eastern Indo-Aryan language, Hajong does not conjugate verbs in the same way as Bengali or Asamiya but rather has a simplified system. The case endings in Hajong are also unique compared to other Indo-Aryan languages and may represent affinity with Tibeto-Burman languages. The following table is taken from Phillips:

Hajong	Hajong (in IPA)	English	Case
বুৰি-ৰৗ	buri-rɯ	the old woman	unmarked
বুৰি-ৰৗগে	buri-rɯge	to the old woman	dative
বুৰি-লৗ	buri-lɯ	of the old woman	genitive
বুৰি নি	buri ni	to/at the old woman	locative
বুৰি ভায়	buri bʰaʲ	to the old woman	allative
বুৰি থিকি	buri t̪ʰiki	from the old woman	ablative
বুৰি দিঅৗ	buri diɯ	through/by the help of the old woman	instrumental

The genitive and unmarked or accusative cases have two forms respectively; rw/ra and lw/la. For words ending with the vowels /a/, /ɛ/ and /ɔ/ it becomes ra and la and for /i/, /u/, /e/, /o/ and /ɯ/ it becomes rw and lw. The vowels /ɛ/(e) and /ɔ/(o) are used to end interrogative sentences, like Bhat khase? (have you taken your food?) and Bhat khabo? (Do you want to eat?); and the vowels /e/(ei) and /o/(ou) are used at the end of declarative sentences, as in Bhat khasei ([I] have taken my food.) and Bhat Khabou ([I] will eat.). Adding the suffix bw or ba to interrogative words turn them into indefinite pronouns; for example, kibw means something, kwibw means someone, kumaba means somewhere and also kwibw, kageba, kundwbw and kalaba means 'I don't know who/whom/which/whose' respectively in English. Similarly adding the suffix ha and ga to verbs means 'come and (verb)' and 'go and (verb)' respectively; for example, khaha means come and eat, niha means come and take; khaga means go and eat and niga means go and take.

=== Honorifics ===
A unique feature of Hajong is the use of honorifics. When talking about someone superior in status, a speaker usually uses special nouns or verb endings to indicate the subject's superiority. Unlike Assamese, Bengali, Sylheti and other Indo-Aryan languages, there is no word like আপুনি/আপনি/আফনে(apuni/apni/afne) to substitute you. Instead, Hajong has a different way to indicate supremacy of the other person. For elders and others of high ranking, people second-person and third-person pronouns are never used. One must always refer elders with their name or their honorary title. Ending words with 'ge' and 'ha' is also a form of showing respect to another person.

=== Sample phrases ===
Phrases from the Hajong – English Phrase Book:

Hajong Phrases	Hajong Latin Script	Meaning
কুমায় জায়?	kumai jai?	Where are you going?
কিংকৗ আছে?	kingkw ase?	How are you?
তই আহিলে? ভিতুৰ ভায় আয়।	Toi ahile? Bhiturbai ai.	You came? Come inside.
তুলা আহাৰা ভালা হুছেই।	Tula ahara bhala husei.	It was good of you to come.
ভাত খাছে?	Bhat khase?	Have you eaten?
চা খাবো?	Cha khabo?	Will you take tea?
তই কুন গাওলা?	Toi kun gaola?	What village are you from?
মই তাঙাবাৰিলৗ।	Moi Tangabarilw.	I am from Tangabari.
ইলা তই কুমায় থাকে?	Ila toi kumai thake?	Now where do you live?
তুলা ঘৰৰা কুমায়?	Tula ghorra kumai?	Where is your house?
মুলা ঘৰৰা হাৱাখানানি।	Mula ghorra Hawakhanani.	My house is in Hawakhana.
ইদৗ অগে বুজিয়ৗ দি।	Idw oge bujyw di.	Explain this to him.
ইদৗনি লিখিক।	Idwni likhik.	Write it here.
ময় জাং।	Moy jang.	I'm going.
আবাৰ লাক পাবোউ।	Abar lak pabou.	We will meet again.
