= List of Scheduled Tribes in Assam =

Ethnic groups in Assam, India

The Constitution of India categorizes the tribes of Assam into two groups: Scheduled Tribes (Hills) and Scheduled Tribes (Plains). Since hills tribes living in the plains and plains tribes living in the hills in large numbers are not recognised as scheduled tribes in the respective places, the census data may not reflect the correct figures. Assamese language is used as the lingua franca by almost all the tribes. According to the 2001 census, Scheduled Tribes made up 12.4 percent of Assam's population. The Assam Tribune reported in 2009 that the tribal communities of Assam were accounted for 15.64 percent of the total population.

== Overview ==
Autonomous division of North East India

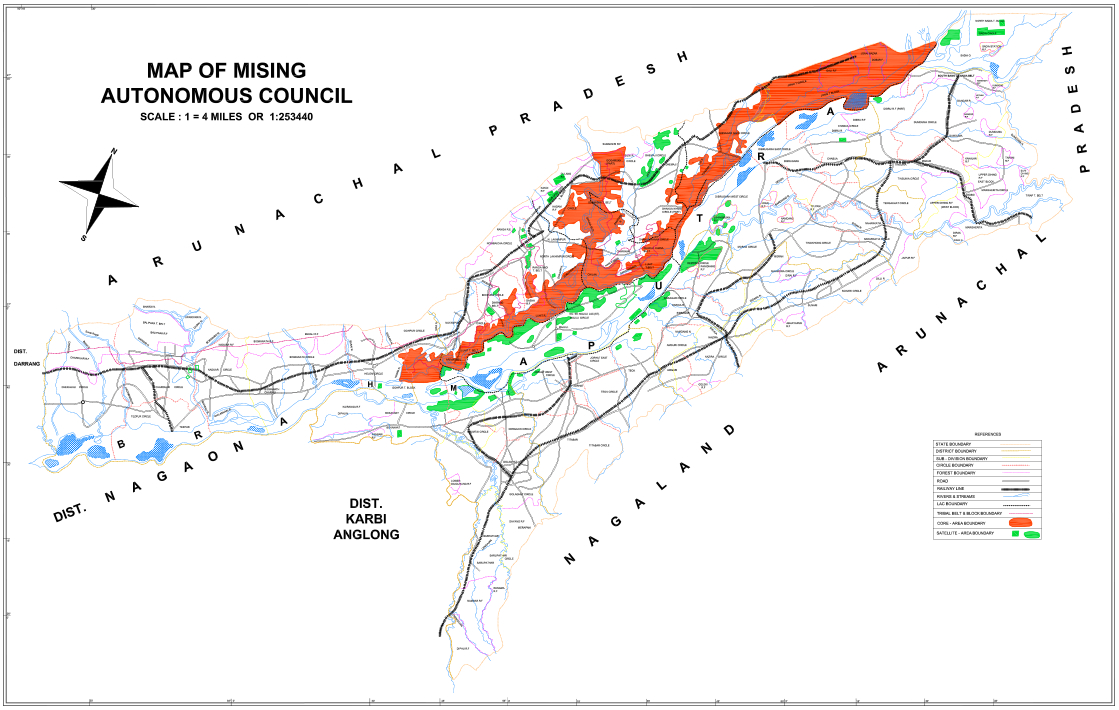
Map of Mising Autonomous Council, with core areas in orange and satellite areas in green

According to the 2011 census, Assam has a Scheduled Tribes (ST) population of 3,884,371 which makes up 12.44% of the state's total population. The major Scheduled Tribes in Assam are the Boro (35.06%), Miri (17.52%), Karbi (11.08%), Rabha (7.63%), and Kachari (6.52%).

Language of Scheduled Tribes of Assam, 2011 census
1. Boro (33.4%)
2. Assamese (24.7%)
3. Miri/Mishing (15.4%)
4. Karbi/Mikir (11.3%)
5. Garo (4.09%)
6. Dimasa (3.05%)
7. Rabha (2.55%)
8. Other (5.49%)
Distribution of Scheduled Tribes of Assam, 2011 census
1. Autonomous district (17.4%)
2. Outside autonomous district (78.0%)
3. Generic Tribes of both the region (4.61%)
According to 2011 census, only two district viz, Karbi Anglong and Dima Hasao are considered as autonomous district

However, the Scheduled status of these tribes is subject to specific territories. In the autonomous districts of Karbi Anglong and Dima Hasao, the prominent tribal groups are the Karbi (63.63%), Dimasa (including Kachari) (15.22%), any Kuki tribe (4.94%), and any Naga tribe (4.4%). Outside these two autonomous districts, the main Scheduled Tribes are the Boro (44.96%), Miri (22.46%), Rabha (9.78%), Kachari (including Sonwal) (8.38%), Lalung (6.03%), and Garo (4.49%).

In terms of linguistic demographics, 33.39% of the total Scheduled Tribe population in Assam speak Boro, 24.73% speak Assamese, 15.39% speak Miri/Mishing, 11.31% speak Karbi/Mikir, 4.09% speak Garo, 3.05% speak Dimasa, and 2.55% speak Rabha. Other languages spoken among the Scheduled Tribes include Haijong (26,540 speakers), Lalung (25,373), Deori (24,766), Zemi (19,561), Kuki (18,652), Hmar (17,584), Khasi (11,520), and Bengali (11,163). Additionally, there are speakers of Rengma, Rongmei, Hindi, Pnar/Synteng, Chakma, Nepali, Ao, Thado, Kachari, and Luhasi/Mizo languages.

== List of tribes ==
=== In the autonomous districts of Karbi Anglong and North Cachar Hills ===
- Chakma
- Dimasa, Kachari
- Garo
- Hajong
- Hmar
- Khasi, Jaintia, Synteng, Pnar, War, Bhoi, Lyngngam
- Lakher
- Man (Tai speaking)
- Karbi
- Pawi
- Syntheng
- Lalung
- Any Mizo (Lushai) tribes
- Any Naga tribes
- Any Kuki tribes

=== In the State of Assam excluding Karbi Anglong and North Cachar Hills ===
- Barmans in Cachar
- Boro, Borokachari
- Deori
- Hajong
- Kachari, Sonowal
- Lalung
- Mech
- Singhpo
- Miri
- Rabha
- Dimasa
- Hajong
- Garo
- Mising

== Demographics ==
| ST Code | Scheduled Tribe | Population (as of 2012) |
|---|---|---|
In the Autonomous districts
| 001 | Chakma | 2,032 |
| 002 | Dimasa, Kachari | 1,02,961 |
| 003 | Garo | 25,315 |
| 004 | Hajong | 436 |
| 005 | Hmar | 15,735 |
| 006 | Khasi, Jaintia, Synteng, Pnar, War, Bhoi, Lyngngam | 15,936 |
| 007 | Any Kuki tribes | 33,399 |
| 008 | Lakher | 37 |
| 009 | Man (Tai speaking) | 1,269 |
| 010 | Any Mizo (Lushai) tribes | 880 |
| 011 | Karbi | 4,30,452 |
| 012 | Any Naga tribes | 29,767 |
| 013 | Pawi | 3 |
| 014 | Syntheng | 5 |
| 015 | Lalung | 18,525 |
In state of Assam excluding Autonomous districts
| 016 | Barmans in Cachar | 6,716 |
| 017 | Boro, Boro-Kacharis | 13,61,735 |
| 018 | Deori | 52,185 |
| 019 | Hajong | 642 |
| 020 | Kachari, Sonowal | 2,53,344 |
| 021 | Lalung | 1,82,663 |
| 022 | Mech | 9,883 |
| 023 | Miri | 6,80,424 |
| 024 | Rabha | 2,96,189 |
| 025 | Dimasa | 19,702 |
| 026 | Hajong | 34,253 |
| 027 | Singhpo | 2,342 |
| 028 | Khampti | 1,106 |
| 029 | Garo | 1,36,077 |
| Total population | | 38,84,371 |

== Demographics ==
| District | | Scheduled Tribes | | |
| Name | Population | Total (2011) | Percent | Top 3 largest |
|---|---|---|---|---|
in state outside of Autonomous districts
| Kokrajhar | 8,87,142 | 2,78,665 | 31.41 | Boro (225,041); Rabha (22,255); Garo (10,424) |
| Goalpara | 10,08,183 | 2,31,570 | 22.97 | Rabha (103,757); Garo (71,452); Boro (41,224) |
| Barpeta | 16,93,622 | 27,344 | 1.61 | Boro (25,311); Rabha (152); Deori (60) |
| Dhubri | 19,49,258 | 6,332 | 0.37 | Garo (3,348); Boro (1,203); Rabha (235) |
| Morigaon | 9,57,423 | 1,36,777 | 14.28 | Lalung (109,530); Boro (12,070); Sonowal (6,340) |
| Nagaon | 28,23,768 | 1,15,153 | 4.08 | Lalung (58,511); Boro (17,317); Garo (6,996) |
| Sonitpur | 19,24,110 | 2,32,207 | 12.07 | Boro (154,311); Miri (49,028); Rabha (4,161) |
| Lakhimpur | 10,42,137 | 2,49,426 | 23.93 | Miri (197,886); Sonowal (19,203); Deori (13,220) |
| Dhemaji | 6,86,133 | 3,25,560 | 47.45 | Miri (220,042); Boro (45,392); Sonowal (25,356) |
| Tinsukia | 13,27,929 | 82,066 | 6.18 | Sonowal (40,560); Miri (18,145); Deori (8,080) |
| Dibrugarh | 13,26,335 | 1,02,871 | 7.76 | Sonowal (76,007); Miri (9,282); Mech (3,969) |
| Sivasagar | 11,51,050 | 49,039 | 4.26 | Miri (27,834); Sonowal (8,639); Deori (3,780) |
| Jorhat | 10,92,256 | 1,39,971 | 12.81 | Miri (102,270); Sonowal (22,058); Deori (4,174) |
| Golaghat | 10,66,888 | 1,11,765 | 10.48 | Miri (53,028); Boro (29,994); Sonowal (19,189) |
| Cachar | 17,36,617 | 17,569 | 1.01 | Dimasa (9,758); Barman in Cachar (4,899); Boro (174) |
| Karimganj | 12,28,686 | 1,940 | 0.16 | Barmans in Cachar (962); Dimasa (200); Boro (111) |
| Hailakandi | 6,59,296 | 691 | 0.10 | Barmans in Cachar (202); Dimasa (166); Boro (47) |
| Bongaigaon | 7,38,804 | 18,835 | 2.55 | Boro (7,315); Rabha (5,599); Garo (3,600) |
| Chirang | 4,82,162 | 1,78,688 | 37.06 | Boro (167,888); Rabha (2,040); Garo (443) |
| Kamrup | 15,17,542 | 1,82,038 | 11.99 | Rabha (91,034); Boro (51,885); Garo (26,037) |
| Kamrup Metropolitan | 12,53,938 | 75,121 | 5.99 | Boro (33,916); Sonowal (8,029); Lalung (7,318) |
| Nalbari | 7,71,639 | 23,364 | 3.03 | Boro (14,178); Sonowal (6,387); Rabha (50) |
| Baksa | 9,50,075 | 3,31,007 | 34.84 | Boro (288,397); Rabha (20,009); Hajong (1,029) |
| Darrang | 9,28,500 | 8,419 | 0.91 | Boro (4,580); Sonowal (2,161); Rabha (641) |
| Udalguri | 8,31,668 | 2,67,361 | 32.15 | Boro (218,581); Rabha (30,873); Garo (5,175) |
in the autonomous districts
| Karbi Anglong | 9,56,313 | 5,38,738 | 56.33 | Karbi (421,156); Dimasa (28,459); Garo (24,988) |
| Dima Hasao | 2,14,102 | 1,51,843 | 70.92 | Dimasa (74,503); Kuki tribes (24,079); Naga tribes (20,832) |
| | 3,12,05,576 | 38,84,371 | 12.45 | |

== Demand for inclusion in Scheduled list ==
In Assam, STs are divided into two categories—ST (Plains), with ten percent reservation, and ST (Hills), with five percent reservation. Fourteen communities are listed under these categories, with a population of about 4 million, comprising 12.4 percent of the state’s population, as per the 2011 census of India. A number of non-ST groups have been demanding Scheduled Tribe status, including the Tai Ahom, Koch-Rajbongshi, Chutia, Moran, Matak and Tea Tribes, accounting for a little less than a third of the states’ population. Their demands are opposed by the existing ST population of Assam. A contentious issue is that the Other Backward Class category was implemented based on the Mandal Commission in August 1990, but these groups want to avail affirmative action under the category of Schedule Tribe. An Assam government report from 29 November 2025 declared that “Presently, 27% reservation is available for OBCs…Once these six communities are declared as ST, a proportionate share can be deducted and made available to the new six communities with a separate nomenclature, such as ST (Valley), to avoid any conflict with the existing tribal communities”. However, Daniel Langthasa, an activist-turned-politician from Dima Hasao, a hilly region under the Sixth Schedule, declared that: “We have to compete for central government jobs with those who have been living in the plains, who have access to proper roads, schools and colleges, who have been assimilated into the mainstream and have a higher social status”.

According to Crémin, the identity criteria of modern ST communities in Assam rest more on the knowledge of ethnolinguistics, the founding myths and the religious practices specific to the group. According to this view, construction of identity around ST status is a process originating from an administrative definition, leading to a reification of the identities that determine belonging, as well as social, political and territorial claims. The present challenge facing the Assam government is to broaden affirmative action to communities without tampering with the cultural rights and the constitutional protections of the existing ST groups. This has led some writers such as Manoranjan Pegu to centre the debate on the question of “To be or not to be a Scheduled Tribe”? For the pre-existing ST population, broadening of affirmation action under the category of ST is problematic because, in the words of Daniel Langthasa, the proposals are being made on behalf of those “...who have been assimilated into the mainstream and have a higher social status”.

== See also ==
- Scheduled Castes and Scheduled Tribes
