= Hojai =

- Town
- Location in Assam, India Hojai (India)
- Coordinates: 26.0°N 92.87°E
- Country: India
- State: Assam
- District: Hojai

Government
  - Type: Municipal
  - Body: Hojai Municipality Board
  - MLA: Ramkrishna Ghosh (BJP)
  - Chairman: Chaturthi Rani Biswas (BJP)
  - Vice-Chairman: Pranab Ghosh (BJP)
  - Deputy Commissioner: Lachit Kumar Das, ACS
  - Superintendent of Police: Saurabh Gupta, IPS

Area
  - Total: 21.219 km^{2} (8.193 sq mi)

Population (2011)
  - Total: 36,638
  - Density: 1,726.7/km^{2} (4,472.0/sq mi)

Language
  - Official: Assamese
  - Associate Official Language: Meitei (Manipuri)
  - Most spoken language: Bengali
- Time zone: UTC+5:30 (IST)
- PIN: 782435
- Hojai STD Code: +91-3674
- ISO 3166 code: IN-AS
- Vehicle registration: AS 31
- HDI: ▲0.695 medium
- Effective literacy: 90.7%
- Climate: Cwa (Köppen)
- Website: hojai.assam.gov.in

Hojai is a town and a municipal board in Hojai district in the Indian state of Assam. It is located on the banks of the two tributaries of Brahmaputra, namely Kapili and Jamuna.

== Etymology ==
The term Hojai means Priest in the Dimasa language and is also one of the clans of the Dimasa people.

== Geography ==
Hojai is located at 26.0°N 92.87°E. It has an average elevation of 59 metres (193 feet).

== History ==
Hojai was a part of the Dimasa Kachari Kingdom in medieval times. The Dimasa Kacharies living in Hojai is known as "Hojai-Kacharies" to others. "Hojai" is one of the clans (Sengphongs) of the Dimasa tribe, The city "Hojai" got its name from this clan. It was made a sub-division on 15 August 1983 under Nagaon district. On 15 August 2015, it was declared a new district of the state along with 3 other new districts. On 31 December 2022, the district were remerged with their previous district. Nonetheless, on 25 August 2023, the Assam cabinet unveiled its decision to reinstate Hojai's district status.

== Demographics ==
=== Population ===
As of 2011 Indian Census, Hojai had a total population of 36,638, of which 18,762 were males and 17,876 were females. Population within the age group of 0 to 6 years was 3,869. The total number of literates in Hojai was 29,708, which constituted 81.1% of the population with male literacy of 83.9% and female literacy of 78.1%. The effective literacy rate of 7+ population of Hojai was 90.7%, of which male literacy rate was 93.8% and female literacy rate was 87.4%. The Scheduled Castes and Scheduled Tribes population was 3,158 and 197, respectively. Hojai had 7049 households in 2011.

=== Languages ===
Languages of Hojai
1. Bengali (69.6%)
2. Hindi (16.0%)
3. Assamese (9.50%)
4. Meitei (1.60%)
5. Dimasa Kachari (1.80%)
6. Others (2.30%)

Assamese and Meitei (Manipuri) are the official languages of this place.

69.6% of the people speak Bengali, followed by Hindi, 16.0%; Assamese, 10.7%; Dimasa Kachari 1.8% and Meitei, 1.6% speakers.

=== Religion ===
Religions in Hojai town
Religion	Percent of population
Hinduism	81.11%
Islam	18.28%
Others	0.61%

Most of the population follow Hinduism (81.11%), with Islam being the largest minority religion with 18.28% adherents. Sikhism, Christianity and other religions are followed by less than one per cent of the population.

== Administration ==
Administrative duties are carried on from Sankardev Nagar in NH-27 where the DC Office, Judicial Courts as well District SP Offices are located. The DC Office campus also houses the Government Circuit House within it. Hojai Judicial Courts are situated at Sankardev Nagar approximately 8 km away from Hojai Town near NH-27. Advocates of the Hojai Judicial Courts have their own Association known as "Hojai Bar Association", established in 1982.

=== District administration ===
The present Deputy Commissioner is Anupam Choudhury, ACS and the present Superintendent of Police is Barun Purkayastha. and present Additional Superintendent of police is Punjit Duwara, APS. Deputy Superintendent of Police Hojai is Rosy Talukdar, APS.

=== Judiciary ===
Initially the Judicial Court at Hojai was established on 20 October 1982 and functioned as Court of Judicial Magistrate First Class. In due course of time, later on, the Courts of Additional District and Sessions Judge (Fast Track Court), Sub-Divisional Judicial Magistrate, Munsiff cum JMFC Courts were established and functioning under District Judiciary, Nagaon.

On 6 March 2021, Suman Shyam, Judge Guahati High Court, has inaugurated the newly created Courts of District & Sessions Judge and Chief Judicial Magistrate at Hojai, Sankardev Nagar. On inauguration of the new District Judiciary, Aditya Hazarika became the first District & Sessions Judge and Shakti Sharma became the first Chief Judicial Magistrate of Hojai District.

== Politics ==
Hojai is an MLA constituency that falls under the Nagaon Lok Sabha constituency. It was previously a part of the Jamunamukh LAC. Since its inception in 1967, seven individuals have been elected as MLAs.

The first was Jonab Rahimuddin Ahmed. He was followed by Idris Ali Fakir, Sadhan Ranjan Sarkar, Santi Ranjan Dasgupta and since 1991, Ardhendu Kumar Dey has been consistently elected as an MLA, the lone defeat coming in 2006 to AIUDF's Aditya Langthasa who served as an MLA for a single term. Ardhendu Kumar Dey regained his seat in 2011 for a fourth term. For the first time, in 2016 assembly elections, BJP wrested this seat with the incumbent MLA being Shiladitya Dev.As of 2021, Ramkrishna Ghosh is elected in Assam Legislative Assembly election in 2021 from Hojai constituency.At present, Ramkrishna Ghosh is the MLA of Hojai District.

== Economy ==
Hojai is one of the important hubs of agarwood oil extraction and trade. In 2019, the Assam government under Sarbananda Sonowal allowed plantation of agarwood in five hectares.

== Education ==
=== List of educational institutes ===
- Rabindranath Tagore University, Hojai

== Healthcare ==
=== Hospitals ===
Hojai has two hospitals. Hojai Civil Hospital is an Government owned hospital and Haji Abdul Majid Memorial Hospital (HAMM) and Research Center is a private Hospital, inaugurated in 1995 by Mother Teresa. It offers free treatment to the poor. Its charitable dispensary, established in 1986, treats over ten patients for free every day. The hospital has an Operating Theatre and a Dental clinic.

== Transport ==
=== Road ===
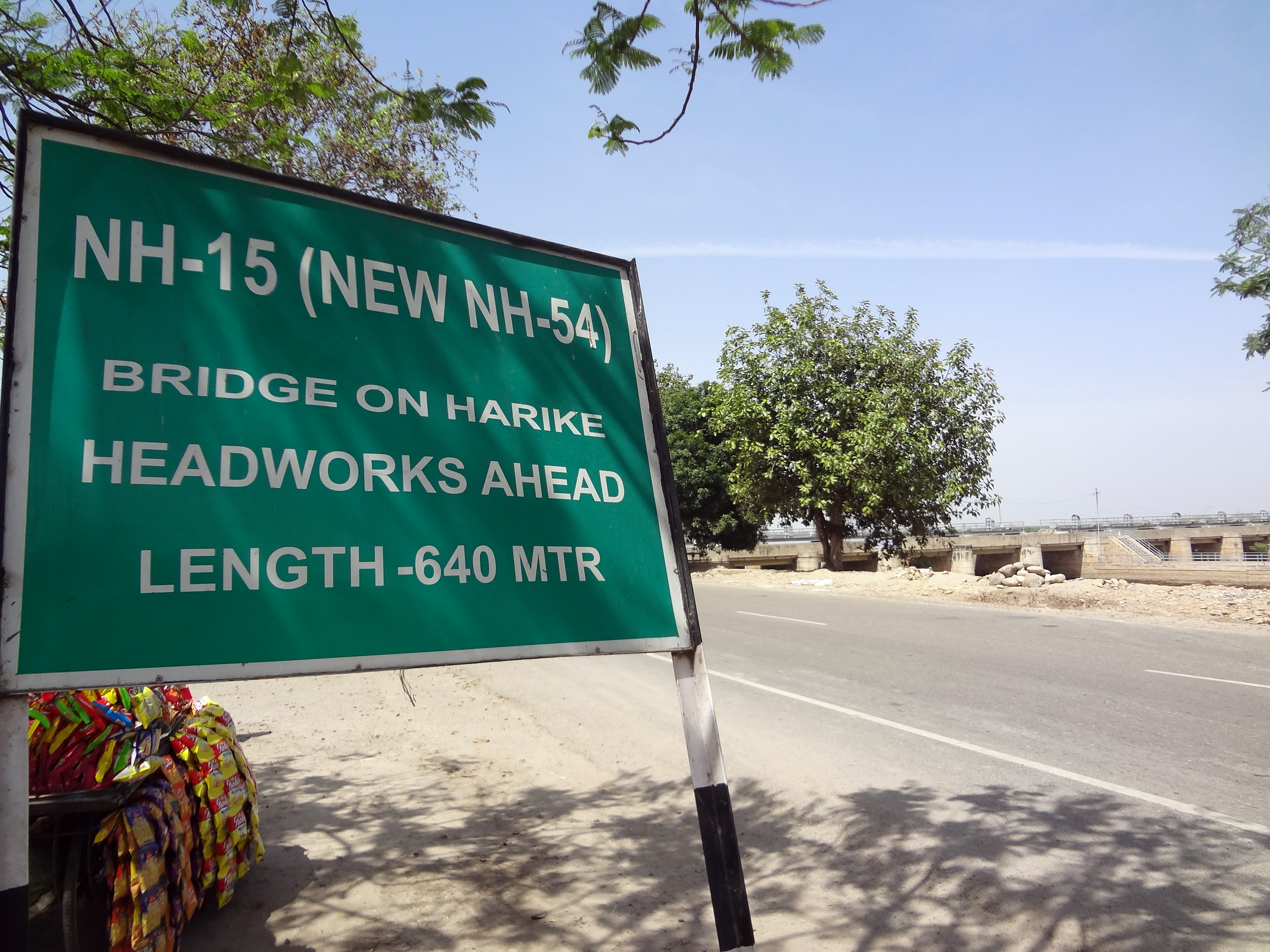

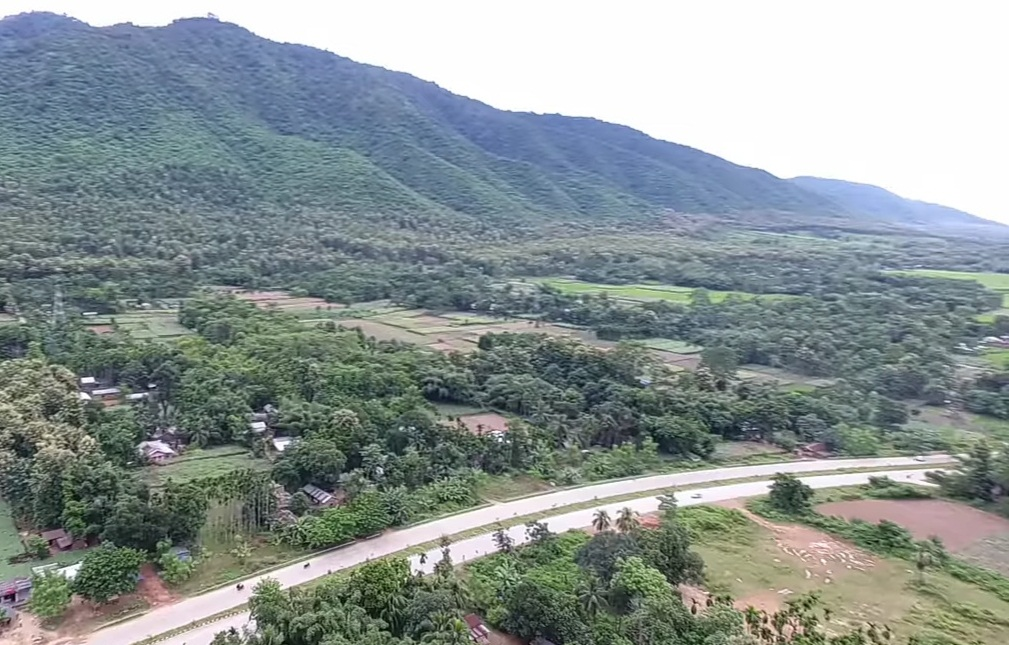
East-West Corridor a four Lane Road through Hojai District.

State roads connect Hojai to the rest of the state, and the nearest National Highway is NH27. Buses also provide connections between Hojai and the rest of Assam, as well as other states. A proposed flyover in Hojai is currently under construction.

=== Railway ===
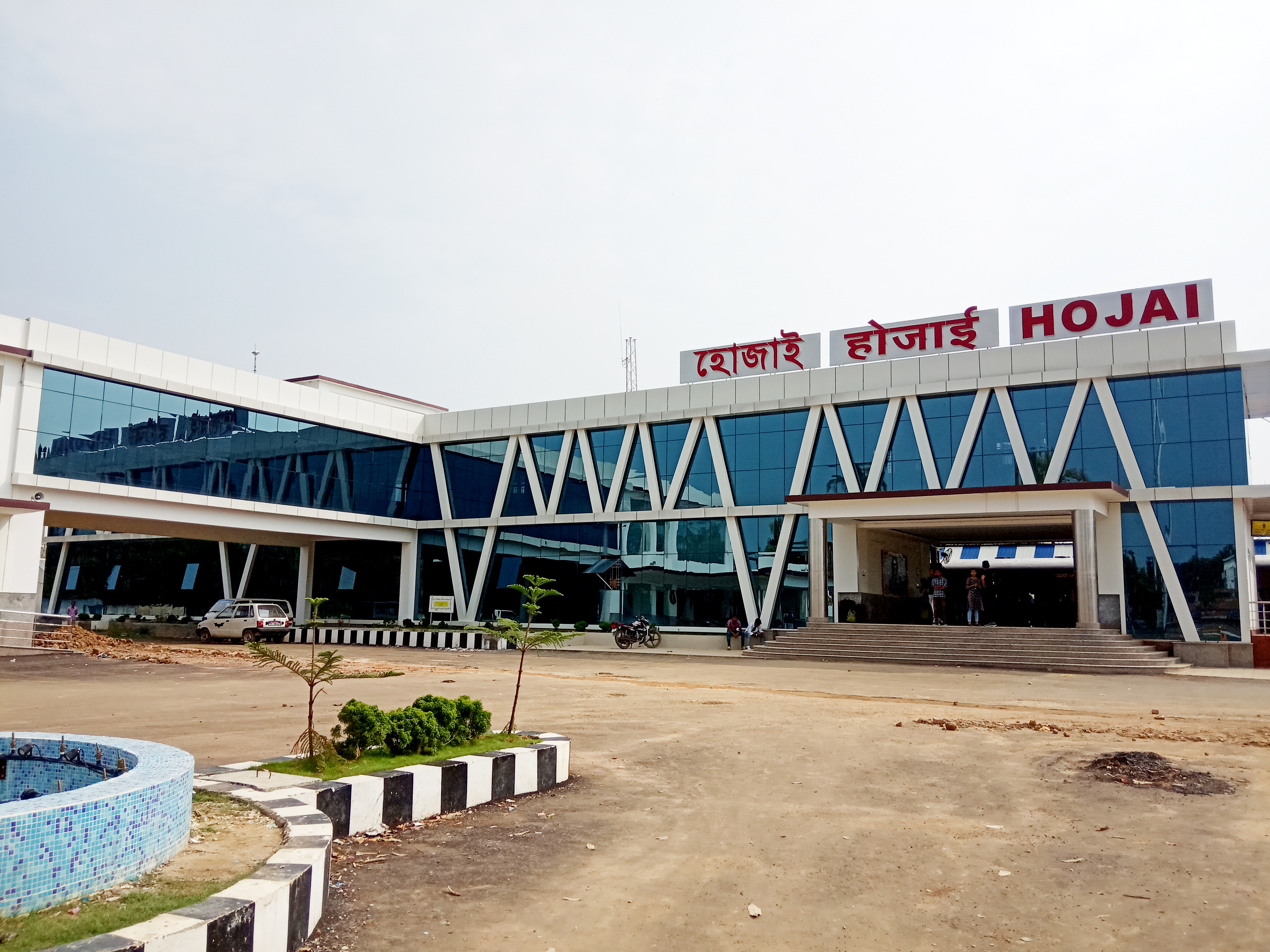
Newly built airport-like Hojai Railway Station

The Hojai railway station lies on the Guwahati–Lumding section line of the Lumding railway division. The station provides railway connectivity to different cities of India through many long-distance trains. Almost all of the major trains have a stoppage including the Rajdhani Express which connects the national capital.

=== Airport ===
The nearest airport is Tezpur Airport, about 120 km away.

The nearest International Airport is LGB International Airport in Guwahati, about 190 km away.

== See also ==
- Hojai Vidhan Sabha
