= Proposed states and union territories of India =

Aspirant states and union territories of India

The constitutional power to create new states and union territories in India is solely reserved with the Parliament of India, which can do so by announcing new states/union territories, separating territory from an existing state or merging two or more states/union territories or parts of them. As of October 2025, there are 28 states and eight union territories in India.

There have been demands to create several new states and union territories. However, demanding a separate state from the administration of Indian union is punishable under secession law in India.

== History ==
=== 1947–56 ===
Administrative divisions of India in 1950

Before independence, India was divided into British-administered provinces and nominally autonomous princely states, governed by the British administration. After Indian Independence in 1947, the provinces became part of the Indian Union and the princely states who acceded were absorbed into the Union. In 1950, after the adoption of the Constitution of India, these became part of the Republic of India with the constitution classifying the states into four categories.

Administrative divisions of India (1950)
Part A	Assam, Bihar, Bombay, East Punjab, Madhya Pradesh, Madras, Orissa, Uttar Pradesh, West Bengal
Part B	Hyderabad, Jammu and Kashmir, Madhya Bharat, Mysore, Patiala and East Punjab States Union, Rajasthan, Saurashtra, Travancore–Cochin, Vindhya Pradesh
Part C	Ajmer, Bhopal, Bilaspur, Coorg, Delhi, Himachal Pradesh, Kutch, Manipur, Tripura, Vindhya Pradesh
Part D	Andaman and Nicobar Islands

During the 1950–1956 period, small changes were made to state boundaries with Bilaspur merging with Himachal Pradesh on 1 July 1954 and Chandernagore, a former enclave of French India incorporated into West Bengal in 1955. In 1953, Andhra state was split from Madras state, following the death of Potti Sriramulu and the subsequent riots, demanding a separate state for the Telugus. In 1954, French enclaves of Pondichéry, Karikal, Yanaon and Mahé were transferred to India. In 1956, the States Reorganisation Act was passed, which re-organized the country into 14 states of Andhra Pradesh, Assam, Bihar, Bombay, Jammu and Kashmir, Kerala, Madhya Pradesh, Madras, Mysore, Orissa, Punjab, Rajasthan, Uttar Pradesh, West Bengal and six union territories of Andaman and Nicobar Islands, Delhi, Manipur, Tripura, Himachal Pradesh, Laccadive, Minicoy & Amindivi Islands.

=== 1957–99 ===
Bombay state was split into Gujarat and Maharashtra on 1 May 1960 by the Bombay Reorganisation Act. Goa, Daman and Diu was established as a union territory, following the liberation of Goa from Portuguese in 1961. In 1961, during Bengali Language Movement, protests erupted demanding a separate Barak state. Pondicherry was established as a union territory. In 1963, Naga people of undivided Assam's Naga hills demanded for a separate Nagaland state, resulting in clashes with the statehood granted on 1 December 1963. In 1966, protests erupted demanding a separate Mizo state which resulted in the bombing of Aizawl. The Punjabi Suba movement, which sought a separate Punjabi-speaking state, resulted in the Punjab Reorganisation Act of 1966, which created the state of Haryana and the union territory of Chandigarh with the transfer of the northern districts of Punjab to Himachal Pradesh.

Madras state was renamed as Tamil Nadu in 1969. Himachal Pradesh was elevated to statehood in 1970. The north-eastern states of Manipur, Meghalaya and Tripura were established in January 1972. Mysore State was renamed Karnataka in 1973. The Kingdom of Sikkim joined the Indian Union as a state on 26 April 1975. In February 1987, Arunachal Pradesh and Mizoram were established as new states. In May 1987, Goa achieved statehood with the northern exclaves of Daman and Diu becoming a separate union territory. The Gorkhaland movement during 1986–88, demanding a separate state resulted in violtent clashes, encounters and arrests.

=== 2000–present ===
In 2000, three new states were created: Chhattisgarh from Madhya Pradesh, Uttaranchal from Uttar Pradesh and Jharkhand from Bihar. In 2006, Pondicherry was renamed as Puducherry and Uttaranchal became Uttarakhand followed by Orissa being renamed as Odisha in 2011. There have been other movements such as the Bodoland and Karbiland in Assam which have resulted in violence. In June 2014, Telangana was separated from Andhra Pradesh as the 29th state of the union, following the Telangana movement. On 31 October 2019, the state of Jammu and Kashmir was split into two new union territories of Jammu and Kashmir and Ladakh. On 26 January 2020, the Union Territory of Daman and Diu and the Union Territory of Dadra and Nagar Haveli were merged into a single union territory of Union Territory of Dadra and Nagar Haveli and Daman and Diu.

== Proposed states ==
There have been several demands in the past and the present for the creation of new states and union territories.

Proposed	State/UT	District(s)	Image	Notes
Ahomland	Assam	Biswanath, Darrang, Lakhimpur, Sivasagar, Sonitpur, Udalguri		Various organizations in Upper Assam have been demanding a separate Ahomland state since 1967. In 2023, TAI Ahom Yuba Parishad Assam (TAYPA) organized a protest at demanding a separate state.
Awadh	Uttar Pradesh	Ambedkar Nagar, Bahraich, Balrampur, Barabanki, Siddharth Nagar, Ayodhya, Gonda, Lakhimpur Kheri, Sitapur, Hardoi, Lucknow, Pratapgarh, Raebareli, Amethi, Shravasti, Bhadohi, Sultanpur, Unnao, Fatehpur, Kaushambi, Prayagraj, Kanpur, Kanpur Dehat, Etawah, Auraiya, Kannauj		The proposed state would consist of Awadhi-speaking districts of central Uttar Pradesh, consisting of an area of 75,000 km^{2} (29,000 sq mi) and a population of 50 million.
Bagelkhand	Madhya Pradesh, Uttar Pradesh	Anuppur, Chitrakoot, Rewa, Satna, Shahdol, Sidhi, Singrauli, Umaria		Bagelkhand region was named after the Vaghela Rajput kings in the 14th century and was part of the Bagelkhand Agency.
Barak State	Assam, Manipur	Cachar, Dima Hasao, Hailakandi, Hojai, Jiribam, Karimganj		The Bengali people of Assam have demanded a separate state for themselves in the Barak Valley and its neighbouring contiguous Bengali areas, with Silchar as the capital.
Bhil Pradesh	Chhattisgarh, Gujarat, Maharashtra, Madhya Pradesh, Rajasthan	Dhar, Jhabua, Khargone, Ratlam and parts of Chhattisgarh, Gujarat, Maharashtra and Rajasthan		The Bhil people have demanded the establishment of a separate state of Bhil Pradesh with the districts consisting of majority Bhili speakers. Political parties have raised the demand for separate state as recently as in 2023.
Bhojpur	Bihar, Uttar Pradesh	Azamgarh, Ballia, Basti, Bhojpur, Buxar, Chandauli, Deoria, Ghazipur, Gopalganj, Gorakhpur, Kaimur, Jaunpur Kushinagar, Maharajganj, Mirzapur, Mau, Rohtas, Saran, Siwan, Sant Kabir Nagar, Sidharthanagar, Varanasi		There have been demands for a separate state, comprising the Bhojpuri-speaking districts of western Bihar and eastern Uttar Pradesh.
Bodoland	Assam	Baksa, Chirang, Kokrajhar, Udalguri		There have been demands for a separate Bodoland Territorial Region for the Bodo people. The agitations led to the creation of Bodoland Territorial Council, an entity subordinate to the government of Assam, governing four districts covering 3,082 Bodo-majority villages.
Braj Pradesh	Uttar Pradesh	Agra, Aligarh, Auraiya, Etawah, Farrukhabad, Mathura district		There is a demand for the creation of a separate state of Braj Pradesh, consisting of the historical Braj region with the speakers of Braj Bhasha.
Bundelkhand	Madhya Pradesh, Uttar Pradesh	Banda, Chhatarpur, Chitrakoot, Damoh, Datia, Gwalior, Hamirpur, Jhansi, Lalitpur, Jalon, Mahoba, Panna, Sagar, Shivpuri, Tikamgarh		Since the early 1960s, there has been a movement for establishing a Bundelkhand state for promoting the development of the region in the central part of India, which being rich in minerals, is underdeveloped and underrepresented in politics. In 2011, the Government of Uttar Pradesh proposed the creation of Bundelkhand from seven districts of Uttar Pradesh, with Allahabad as the capital while organisations such as Bundelkhand Mukti Morcha demanded its formulation, along with the inclusion of six other districts from Madhya Pradesh. Various political parties have promised the creation of a separate state of Bundelkhand over the years.
Chakmaland	Mizoram	Chakma district council of Lawngtlai, Tlabung, Mamit		Chakmaland is a proposed union territory for the predominantly Buddhist Chakma people in western Mizoram. Chakmas have been demanding to convert the existing Chakma Autonomous District Council and areas of Tlabung in Mizoram into a union territory. The Chakma people have faced discrimination by the predominantly Christian Mizo people, which has led to claims for a separate region.
Delhi	Delhi	Central Delhi, East Delhi, New Delhi, North Delhi, North East Delhi, North West Delhi, Shahdara, South Delhi, South East Delhi, South West Delhi, West Delhi		The political administration of Delhi more closely resembles that of a state than a union territory, with its own legislature headed by a Chief Minister. Delhi is jointly administered by the union government and the local government of Delhi. The government introduced a bill in Parliament in 2003 to grant full statehood, which was not passed. There have been renewed demands to grant statehood to Delhi.
Dimaraji	Assam, Nagaland	Cachar, Dima Hasao, Dimapur, Hojai, Karbi Anglong, Nagaon		The Dimasa people of northeast India have been demanding a separate state called Dimaland.
Frontier Nagaland	Nagaland	Kiphire, Longleng, Mon, Noklak, Shamtor, Tuensang		Eastern Nagaland People's Organization (ENPO) has demanded a separate state for frontier districts of Nagaland, inhabited by the tribes of Konyak, Khiamniungan, Chang, Sangtam, Tikhir, Phom and Yimkhiung.
Garoland	Meghalaya	East Garo Hills, North Garo Hills, South West Garo Hills, South Garo Hills, West Garo Hills		Garo Hills Autonomous District Council (GHADC) is one of the three Autonomous councils within Meghalaya and the Garo National Council is a political party which has demanded a separate state for Garo.
Gorkhaland	West Bengal	Darjeeling, Kalimpong		Gorkhaland movement has demanded a separate state covering the areas inhabited by the Nepali speaking ethnic Indian Gorkha people in northern West Bengal. The demand for a separate administrative region has existed since 1907, when the Hillmen's Association of Darjeeling submitted a memorandum to the Morley-Minto reforms committee. After Indian independence, Akhil Bharatiya Gorkha League (ABGL), a political party from the region demanded greater identity for the Gorkha ethnic group and economic freedom for the community. The movement for a separate state gained momentum during the 1980s, when a violent agitation was carried out by the Gorkha National Liberation Front (GNLF) led by Subhash Ghising. The agitation ultimately led to the establishment of a semi-autonomous body of Darjeeling Gorkha Hill Council (DGHC) in 1988. In 2008, Gorkha Janmukti Morcha (GJM) raised the demand for a separate state again and in 2011, the GJM signed an agreement with the state and central governments for the formation of the Gorkhaland Territorial Administration, a semi-autonomous body that replaced the DGHC in the Darjeeling hills. On 28 March 2022, GJM permanently dropped its Gorkhaland statehood demand, instead seeking political solution within West Bengal.
Gondwana	Chhattisgarh, Madhya Pradesh	Balaghat, Chhindwara, Dindori, Mandla, Seoni		A demand for a state of Gondwana exists from the Mahakoshal region of Chhattisgarh and Madhya Pradesh with a Gondi majority. The Gondwana Gantantra party (GGP) was established in 1991, with the objective to struggle for the creation of a separate Gondwana State comprising regions that were ruled by Gondis.
Greater Punjab	Chandigarh, Haryana, Himachal Pradesh, Punjab, Rajasthan	Ambala, Chandigarh, Fatehabad, Hanumangarh, Kangra, Karnal, Kurukshetra, Sirsa, Solan, Sri Ganganagar, Una and all districts of Punjab		There have been demands raised by Akali Dal to merge the neighbouring Punjabi-speaking areas of Himachal Pradesh, Haryana and Rajasthan to Punjab.
Harit Pradesh	Uttar Pradesh	Agra, Aligarh, Auraiya, Bareilly, Etawah, Farrukhabad, Meerut, Moradabad, Saharanpur		Harit Pradesh is a proposed state from six divisions of Uttar Pradesh with Meerut as the capital with various political parties having supported the same.
Jammu	Jammu and Kashmir	Jammu, Doda, Kathua, Kishtwar, Poonch, Rajouri, Ramban, Reasi, Samba, Udhampur		There have been claims to split the existing union territory into two. In 2020, IkkJutt Jammu was launched and demanded that the Jammu Division should be separated and given statehood.
Jungle Mahal	West Bengal	Bankura, Birbhum, Jhargram, Paschim Medinipur, Purbo Medinipur, Purulia		In 2021, there were calls from a Member of Parliament of the Bharatiya Janata Party (BJP) for the creation of a Junglemahal state from West Bengal, claiming underdevelopment and that the demands of employment and development for locals could only be met if it gets statehood. However, the state unit of the BJP distanced itself from the demand, officially commented that they are against division and the Trinamool Congress filed a complaint against the same.
Kamtapur	Assam, West Bengal	Cooch Behar, Darjeeling, Dhubri, Goalpara, Jalpaiguri, Kamrup		Kamtapur lies in the northern part of West Bengal and the proposed state consists of the six districts in the region.
Karbiland	Assam	Karbi Anglong, West Karbi Anglong		Requests for a separate state for Karbi people have been raised by several organisations over the years with violent protests in July 2013.
Khasiland	Meghalaya	East Jaintia Hills, East Khasi Hills, Eastern West Khasi Hills, Ri Bhoi, South West Khasi Hills, West Khasi Hills, West Jaintia Hills		Hill State People's Democratic Party (HSPDP), a regional political party has demanded to bifurcate Meghalaya to create a separate state for the Khasi people while other parties including the United Democratic Party has opposed the demand.
Kashmir	Jammu and Kashmir	Anantnag, Baramulla, Budgam, Bandipore, Ganderbal, Kupwara, Kulgam, Pulwama, Shopian, Srinagar		There have been claims to split the existing union territory to create a separate state for the Kashmiris.
Kodagu	Karnataka	Kodagu		The Codava National Council (CNC) has demanded for the creation of a new autonomous region for the Kodava.
Kongu Nadu	Tamil Nadu (Note: Kongu Nadu generally refers to the eleven districts in Western Tamil Nadu. A few sources do include parts of other districts in Tamil Nadu, south eastern Karnataka, and eastern Kerala as part of the region.)	Coimbatore, Dindigul, Dharmapuri, Erode, Kallakurichi, Karur, Krishnagiri, Namakkal, Nilgiris, Tiruppur, Salem and parts of Tiruchirappalli		Kongu Nadu refers to an approximate area of 60,895 km^{2} (23,512 sq mi) in Western Tamil Nadu. It was one of the territorial divisions in the ancient Tamilakam. There has been demands for the formation a separate state of Kongu Nadu, which would include the eleven districts in western Tamil Nadu. While various political parties have occasionally raised the demand, some parties are opposed to any bifurcation of the state. Local caste based political outfits have supported the demand.
Konkan	Goa, Karnataka, Maharashtra	Goa, Raigad, Ratnagiri, Sindhudurg, Uttara Kannada		Konkan coast forms a strip of land along the north-western coast of India and there have been demands for a separate state for the Konkani people.
Kosal	Odisha	Balangir, Bargarh, Boudh, Deogarh, Jharsuguda, Nuapada, Kalahandi, Subarnapur, Sambalpur, Sundargarh, Athmallik subdivision of Angul		Kosal state movement has been demanding a separate state in the Western Odisha region. The Government of Odisha established the Western Odisha Development Council (WODC) in 2011.
Kukiland	Manipur	Chandel, Churachandpur, Jiribam, Kamjong, Kangpokpi, Noney, Pherzawl, Tengnoupal		Kukiland is a proposed separate state for the Kuki people which began in the 1980s and re-surfaced in the aftermath of the 2023 Manipur violence. The Kuki State Demand Committee supported by Kuki National Army has demanded a separate state covering 60% of the area of Manipur, including Southern Manipur and surrounding areas of Sadar Hills.
Kutch	Gujarat	Kutch		Kutch State or Cutch State, covering the Great Rann of Kutch, and the Little Rann of Kutch existed as separate state from 1947 to 1956, which was merged with Bombay state in 1956. It later became part of Gujarat in 1960. There has been demands a return to statehood, citing poor development of the region.
Ladakh	Ladakh	Kargil, Leh		There have been several demands for statehood for Ladakh. Kargil Democratic Alliance and Leh Apex Body demanded statehood and rallied in 2023. Sonam Wangchuk went on a hunger strike demanding statehood.
Mahakoshal	Madhya Pradesh	Chhindwara, Dindori, Jabalpur, Katni, Mandla, Narsinghpur, Seoni		Mahakoshal is a region which lies in the upper or eastern reaches of the Narmada River valley in Madhya Pradesh. Organisations such as Mahakaushal Mukti Morcha and Bharatiya Janashakti have demanded separate statehood for the region with the capital at Jabalpur. It is alleged that although the region is rich in natural resources, the region has seen limited development and the region has a distinct cultural identity.
Malwa	Madhya Pradesh, Rajasthan	Agar, Banswara, Dewas, Dhar, Guna, Indore, Jhabua, Jhalawar, Mandsaur, Neemuch, Pratapgarh, Rajgarh, Ratlam, Shajapur, Ujjain, Sehore		There have been demands for a separate Malwa state with the capital at Indore including the Malvi speaking regions.
Marathwada	Maharashtra	Aurangabad, Beed, Hingoli, Jalna, Latur, Nanded, Osmanabad, Parbhani		Marathwada is one of the five divisions of Maharashtra which was earlier part of the Hyderabad State in British India. After Hyderabad was annexed to India, Marathwada was merged with Bombay state. There have been demands for a separate Marathwada state.
Maru Pradesh	Rajasthan	Barmer, Jaisalmer, Bikaner, Churu, Ganganagar, Hanumangarh, Jhunjhunu, Jodhpur, Nagaur, Pali, Jalore, Sirohi, Sikar		Maru Pradesh is a proposed desert state in North West for the Marwaris.
Magadha Rajya	Southern Bihar and Northern Jharkhand	Vaishali, Samastipur, Begusarai, Sheikhpura, Lakhisarai, Jamui, Patna, Nalanda, Arwal, Jehanabad, Aurangabad, Gaya, Nawada, Garhwa, Palamu, Latehar, Chatra, Hazaribagh, Ramgarh, Bokaro, Koderma, Giridih, Dhanbad, Deoghar, Jamtara, Dumka, Godda, Pakur, Sahebganj		There have been demands for a Magadha Rajya, comprising the Magahi-speaking districts of southern Bihar and a blend of Magahi known as Khortha is spoken by non-tribal populace in North Chotanagpur division of northern Jharkhand.
Mithila	Bihar, Jharkhand	Araria, Begusarai, Bhagalpur, Banka, Darbhanga, Deoghar, Dumka, Godda, Jamtara, Jamui, Katihar, Khagaria, Kishanganj, Lakhisarai, Madhepura, Madhubani, Munger, Muzaffarpur, Pakaur, Purnia, Saharsa, Sahebganj, Samastipur, Sheohar, Sitamarhi, Supaul, Vaishali	Maithili-speaking region of Bihar And Jharkhand	Mithila is a proposed state which would cover the Maithili-speaking regions of Bihar and Jharkhand.
North Bengal	West Bengal	Alipurduar, Cooch Behar, Dakshin Dinajpur, Darjeeling, Jalpaiguri, Kalimpong, Malda, Uttar Dinajpur		In 2021, politicians of Bharatiya Janata Party demanded carving out a state or union territory comprising the North Bengal districts. However, the state unit distanced itself from the demand with Indian National Congress also opposing the same. Different native linguistic ethnic groups have also rejected the separate statehood demand and are against the division of West Bengal.
North Karnataka	Karnataka	Bagalkot, Ballari, Belagavi, Bidar, Bijapur, Dharwad, Gadag, Haveri, Kalaburagi, Koppal, Raichur, Vijayanagara, Yadgir		North Karnataka is a geographical region consisting of mostly semi-arid plateau that constitutes the northern part of the Karnataka with a notable difference from the other regions in terms of language, cuisine and culture. Various organizations have demanded a separate state to be carved out of the region.
Panun Kashmir	Jammu and Kashmir	Anantnag, Baramulla, Srinagar		Panun Kashmir is a proposed union territory in the Kashmir Valley on religious lines which is advocated by the Kashmiri Pandit Network as a homeland for Kashmiri Hindus who have fled the Kashmir valley as a result of ongoing separatist movement and hope to return.
Purvanchal	Uttar Pradesh	Azamgarh, Ballia, Basti, Chandauli, Deoria, Ghazipur, Gorakhpur, Jaunpur, Kushinagar, Maharajganj, Mau, Mirzapur, Sant Kabir Nagar, Sant Ravidas Nagar, Siddharth Nagar, Varanasi		Purvanchal is a geographic region of north-central India, with Bhojpuri as a major language. While the Government of Uttar Pradesh proposed to carve out a separate state with Gorakhpur or Varanasi as its capital in 2009, it has not officially materialized.
Rayalaseema	Andhra Pradesh	Annamayya, Anantapur, Chittoor, Kadapa, Kurnool, Nandyal, Sri Sathya Sai, Tirupati		The proposed state would consist of eight districts of Andhra Pradesh. Organizations such as Rayalaseema Parirakshana Samithi and Rayalaseema Rashtra Samithi advocate for a separate state.
Saurashtra	Gujarat	Ahmedabad, Amreli, Bhavnagar, Botad, Devbhoomi Dwarka, Gir Somnath, Jamnagar, Junagadh, Morbi, Porbandar, Rajkot, Surendranagar		The movement for a separate Saurashtra state was initiated in 1972. Local organisations across the region support the demand of the separate state claiming underdevelopment and lack of job opportunities. The region is linguistically different from the rest of the state due to the prevalence of its own Saurashtra dialect.
Sindhi State	Gujarat, Rajasthan	Barmer, Jaisalmer, Jalore, Kutch		There have been demands for a separate state for the Sindhi people.
Tipraland	Tripura	Parts of Dhalai, Gomati, Khowai, North Tripura, Sipahijala, South Tripura, Unakoti, West Tripura		The Kingdom of Tripura was a kingdom from the early 15th century which was annexed as the princely state of Tripura in 1949 and later achieved statehood on 21 January 1972. The indigenous Tipra people demanded an autonomous district, which was created on 23 March 1979 in the form of the Tripura Tribal Areas Autonomous District Council (TTAADC). A separate statehood is demanded by Indigenous People's Front of Tripura (IPFT) and Tipraland State Party (TSP).
Tulu Nadu	Karnataka, Kerala	Dakshina Kannada, Kasaragod, Udupi		Tulu Nadu is a border region between the states of Karnataka and Kerala in southern India. The demand for a separate state is based on a distinct culture and language (Tulu), and neglect of the region by the state governments. The Karnataka and Kerala state governments have created the Tulu Sahitya Academy to preserve and promote Tuluva culture.
Vidarbha	Maharashtra	Akola, Amravati, Bhandara, Buldhana, Chandrapur, Gadchiroli, Gondia, Nagpur, Wardha, Washim, Yavatmal		Vidarbha is a region that comprises the Amravati and Nagpur divisions of eastern Maharashtra. Support for a separate Vidarbha state had been expressed by various people over time.
Vindhya Pradesh	Madhya Pradesh	Panna, Chhatarpur, Datia, Rewa, Satna, Sidhi, Shahdol, Singrauli, Tikamgarh		Vindhya Pradesh was a former state which was merged into Madhya Pradesh in 1956. Since 2000, there have been demands for the nine districts to be separated from Madhya Pradesh to create a new state.

== See also ==
- Autonomous administrative divisions of India
- Indian reunification
- Greater India
