= Boroic languages =

Boroic
- Geographic distribution: India
- Linguistic classification: Sino-Tibetan: Central Tibeto-Burman?; Sal; Boro–Garo; Boroic
- Subdivisions: Barman; Boro; Dimasa; Kachari; Kokborok; Moran; Tiwa

Language codes
- Glottolog: boro1284

The Boroic languages (also simply Boro languages in a wider sense) are a group within the Boro-Garo languages which are spoken in and around the Brahmaputra basin, Barak Valley and Tripura of present-day northeast India. They are:

- Boro
- Dimasa
- Kachari
- Kokborok (Tripuri)
- Tiwa

The Barman language is a Boroic language spoken by the Barman Kacharis.

Ethnologue (21st edition) include Riang and Usoi as separate languages within the Kokborok language cluster.

Jacquesson (2017:112) also includes Bru (also known as Riang) as a Bodo language.

== Notes ==
- George van Driem (2001) Languages of the Himalayas: An Ethnolinguistic Handbook of the Greater Himalayan Region. Brill.
- Joseph, U.V.; and Burling, Robbins. 2006. Comparative phonology of the Boro Garo languages. Mysore: Central Institute of Indian Languages Publication.
- Wood, Daniel Cody. 2008. An Initial Reconstruction of Proto-Boro-Garo. M.A. Thesis, University of Oregon.
