= Barman Kacharis =

The Barman Kacharis are an indigenous community of Northeast India found in Brahmaputra Valley. They are mainly found in the districts of Lower Assam. Barman Kacharis speak an endangered language called Barman Thar. Since the 2002 Amendment act, many Barman Kacharis in Assam are referred to as 'Barman'. They are not to be confused with the Dimasa people of Cachar who converted to Hinduism, known as "Barmans of Cachar" in Government caste certificates. The Barman Kacharis are a completely different group from Dimasa Barmans.

== History ==
Barmans are called Kacharis because of their Kachari origin. They are spread diffusely in Assam.

== Linguistics ==
The language associated with the Barman Kacharis is the Barman language, or Barman Thar (IPA: /bɔɾmɔn thaɾ/), where “thar” means language. It is a highly endangered language. It is a Tibeto-Burman language that belongs to the Bodo-Garo sub-group. Though the population of the Barman Kachari community is 24,237, according to a 2017 census, only a small part of this population speaks the language.

== Demographics ==
The Barman Kacharis of Brahmaputra Valley remain unscheduled till date. Their literacy rate is estimated at 4 percent. The level of literacy of males and females is 2.5% and 1.5%, respectively.

== Culture ==
Barman Kacharis are patrilineal. Marriage within a clan is prohibited among the Barman Kachari tribe.

Barman Kacharis have their traditional dresses and attires. They wear a kind of long gamsa with langti. Elderly Barman Kacharis wear suria, while the girls and women (maifu) wear a garment upon the chest (dafna) and wrap a gamsa around the neck (duma). A gamsa may also be tied at the waist takara.

=== Chiga Matthaisa ===
The traditional village headman at the top of the village administration is the Chiga Matthaisa or matbar. He has executive and judiciary powers. No community function in the village can be performed without his approval.

=== Beliefs ===
Though Barmans follow Hindu rites and rituals, they have their own sacred beliefs. Their rituals include Basto Puja, Lakshmi Puja and Padma Puja. The place of worship is called thaowl.

Barman Kacharis perform Magh Bihu, which they call 'pusura'. The influence of Vaisnavite Chaitanya dev's religion has enabled them to adopt some Bengali culture, rites and rituals.

=== Festivals ===
Barman Kachari tribes celebrate the indigenous traditional Bihu festival of the indigenous Assamese community. Bihu is the traditional festival for the Barman Kacharis, which is celebrated in mid-April.

The traditional dance of Barman is called meshak, which is performed in fairs and festivals such as Bohag Bihu, Magh Bihu and in pujas.

The day of Uruka is called 'Aarbish' by Barmans. On Aarbish, cattle are bathed and worshiped and offered Gourd-Brinjal, Pitha, and younger Barmans pay their respects to the elder members of the family and pray for blessings for the whole year. The youths, male and female, old man and women wear traditional dresses to sing and dance.

Barman Kachari use musical instruments such as kherem, khambak, charinda and singaa.

=== Bamboo ===
Barman Kacharis use many tools made of bamboo, such as Jakoi (Jakha/Jakhei), Khaloi (Khokki/Khok), and Pal (which are used for fishing). Every Barman Kachari house has a Dheki (handmade grinder). In Barman, the Dheki is pronounced Dhengki, or container of salt (Khamba). Barman Kachari men prepare Hukas (Dhaba) which they use for smoking.

=== Perspective ===
Barman-Kacharis are a peaceful people. Living among the people of various cultures for two and a half centuries, they have maintained their ethnic identity, although cultural assimilation and acculturation and Sanskritisation has taken place. The impact of modernisation has transformed Barman society, but has not destroyed the core Barman Kachari culture. The Barman Kacharis are one of the most colorful ethnic groups of Assam, maintaining their own culture and traditions. They recognize their place among the different indigenous Assamese ethnic groups of Assam.

== Economy ==
Agriculture is the main occupation of Barman-Kacharis. Inhabitants of foothill areas sell firewood. Many farmers work as share-croppers. They cultivate rice, wheat, pulses, and mustard, among other crops. They grow vegetables such as potato, chilli, and brinjal. Their produce also includes betel nut, mango, jackfruit and coconut.

Barman-Kacharis have little formal education, limiting their ability to work in government. Most of the males are carpenters or masons. Barman-Kachari women play an important role in the economic life of the house. They raise livestock, including cattle, goats, pig, hens-ducks and pigeons. Many Barman wives work as labourers in neighbouring communities. Some women weave cloth using traditional looms. Unlike other tribes, Barman Kachari women help in the paddy fields.
