= Moran language =

Extinct Boro-Garo language

Moran
- Native to: India
- Region: Assam
- Language family: Sino-Tibetan: Central Tibeto-Burman?; Sal; Boro–Garo; Boroic; Dimasa–Kokborok; Dimasa; Moran

Language codes
- ISO 639-3: None (mis)
- Linguist List: qg1
- Glottolog: None

Moran (Morān) is an extinct Boro-Garo language which was spoken in Assam and Arunachal Pradesh in Northeast India (mostly Tinsukia, Dibrugarh, Namsai and Changlang districts) and related to the Dimasa language. The census returned 78 speakers in 1901, 24 in 1911 and none in 1931, and the only source of this language exists in a 1904 article by P R Gurdon. The speakers of this language have shifted to the Assamese language. The name "Moran" reportedly means 'forest dweller'.

== Family ==
mother - aai

father - aabai

man - sadai

old woman - Kasi

young woman -Sekhaba

boy - Tadai

girl - sekhaba

father's father - Alu/Abaiu

father's mother - Ale

respected/friend - Odu

person - sadai

elder person - sadaira

== Numerals ==
1 - Sē

2 - Ne

3 - Sām

4 - Biri

5 - Bāha

6 - Do

7 - Sini

8 - Sak

9 - Saku (zi-kho)

10 - Ti

== History ==
According to the research of W.B. Brown, the original language of the Morans was a Kachari language. During the medieval period (13th-16th century), the Morans as well as Chutias after coming in contact and becoming partially assimilated by the invading Shans, resorted to speaking the lingua franca, which was a mixture of their native tongue and Prakrit. This process of transition gave rise to the Moran language, which over time was again replaced by a modern form of Assamese which had a greater influence of Prakrit. The Morans now are found mostly in the Tinsukia district. They were greatly migratory due to jhumming or shifting cultivation even during the colonial era. They gradually migrated north from their original location to Tipam and Charaideo, where the first Tai immigrants met them; this move was probably due to spread of wet-rice cultivation. When the British arrived in the 19th century, the area between Dibrugarh and Sadiya was mostly virgin forests and the chief habitat of the Morans. In the early part of Ahom rule, they were employed in menial capacities as hewers of wood and drawers of water. During the later part of Ahom rule, they were found in areas like Kakotal, Mariani, Holongapar, and Jhansi, where they chiefly worked as Kapahiya (cotton-growers), which demonstrates their scattering around the south bank of the Brahmaputra with the expansion of the Ahom kingdom.

The Moran as well other Kacharis word for water is "Di", which apparently forms the first syllable of all major rivers of Upper Assam including Dibang, Disang, Dikhou, Dikrong, Dikarai, Dihing, Digaru, Difolu, Dimow, Disoi, and so on; this shows that the group were the dominant tribe in the entire region with their seat in Sadiya, the earliest known power and civilisation of Chutias. They were probably the eastern Kachari branch which became isolated during the ahom rule.
