= Aditya Langthasa =

Indian politician

Dr.Aditya Langthasa

MLA of Hojai Vidhan Sabha Constituency
- In office 2006–2011
- Preceded by: Ardhendu Kumar Dey
- Succeeded by: Ardhendu Kumar Dey

Personal details
- Party: All India United Democratic Front

Aditya Langthasa is an Indian politician from the state of Assam. In 2006 he was elected as MLA of Hojai Vidhan Sabha Constituency in Assam Legislative Assembly. He is an All India United Democratic Front politician.
