= Rabindranath Tagore University, Hojai =

State university in Assam, India

Rabindranath Tagore University
- Motto: विद्ययाऽमृतमश्नुते
- Motto in English: Be Immortal through knowledge
- Type: Public
- Established: 2019 (7 years ago)
- Affiliations: UGC
- Chancellor: Governor of Assam
- Vice-Chancellor: Dr. Manabendra Dutta Choudhury
- Location: Hojai, Assam, India
- Website: www.rtuassam.ac.in

Rabindranath Tagore University is a public state university located in Hojai, Hojai district, Assam. The university is established by Rabindranath Tagore University Bill, 2017 which was passed by the Government of Assam on 7 September 2017. It was created by upgradation of Hojai College in Hojai.

In August 2024, Dr. Manabendra Dutta Choudhury took charge as 2nd Vice-Chancellor of the University. On 7 June 2019, Amalendu Chakraborty took charge as the first Vice-Chancellor of Rabindranath Tagore University. It was named after Rabindranath Tagore, a Nobel laureate polymath, poet, and artist from the Indian subcontinent.

== Affiliated colleges ==
The university has jurisdiction over colleges in Hojai district.

== Developments ==
On 9 July 2025, the Public Works Department handed over the first phase of the university's new campus at Sagarbasti. It included a two-storey academic building and an administrative building, made at ₹58.92 crore.

In the 2024–25 academic year, the university introduced Manipuri cinema as a subject in its BA Manipuri Honours course. It was added as an 80-mark course in the fifth semester. It consists of three units — Manipuri cinema, documentaries and short films, and the films Matamgi Manipur and Sanabi.

== Controversies ==
In September 2022, the students staged a protest at the university campus over re-feeting from backed students. In September 2023, the ABVP submitted a memorandum to Assam Governor, asking for the removal of vice-chancellor Amalendu Chakraborty. They accused him of irregularities in recruitment and university administration.
