= Hojai Assembly constituency =

Constituency of the Assam legislative assembly in India

Hojai
- Constituency No. 63 for the Assam Legislative Assembly
- 63-Hojai within Hojai district

Constituency details
- Country: India
- Region: Northeast India
- State: Assam
- Division: Central Assam
- District: Hojai
- Lok Sabha constituency: Kaziranga
- Established: 1967
- Total electors: 251,818
- Reservation: None

Member of Legislative Assembly
- 16th Assam Legislative Assembly
- Incumbent Shiladitya Dev
- Party: BJP
- Alliance: NDA
- Elected year: 2016, 2026
- Preceded by: Ramkrishna Ghosh (BJP)

Hojai State assembly constituency is one of the 126 state legislative assembly constituencies in Assam, India. It is one of the ten assembly segments that constitute the Kaziranga Lok Sabha constituency. Since 2026, it has been represented by Shiladitya Dev of the Bharatiya Janata Party.

Established in 1967, the constituency was redrawn during the 2023 delimitation exercise. The reconstituted constituency now includes Hojai town, and many other rural areas of the Hojai district.

== Members of the Legislative Assembly ==
Election	Member	Political Party	Tenure
2026	Shiladitya Dev	Bharatiya Janata Party	Incumbent
2021	Ramkrishna Ghosh	Bharatiya Janata Party	2021-26
2016	Shiladitya Dev	Bharatiya Janata Party	2016-21
2011	Ardhendu Kumar Dey	Indian National Congress	2011-16
2006	Aditya Langthasa	All India United Democratic Front	2006-11
2001	Ardhendu Kumar Dey	Indian National Congress	1991-06
1996	Ardhendu Kumar Dey	Indian National Congress	1991-06
1991	Ardhendu Kumar Dey	Indian National Congress	1991-06
1985	Santi Ranjan Das Gupta	Independent politician	1985-91
1983	Sadhan Ranjan Sarkar	Indian National Congress	1983-85
1978	Santi Ranjan Das Gupta	Janata Party	1978-83
1972	Idris Ali Fakir	Indian National Congress	1972-78
1967	R Ahmed	Swatantra Party	1967-72

== Election results ==
=== 2026 ===
2026 Assam Legislative Assembly election: Hojai
Party	Candidate	Votes	%	±%
BJP	Shiladitya Dev	144,361	64.24	▲7.60
INC	Jhilli Chowdhury	77,660	34.56	▼6.87
NOTA	None of the above	2,684	1.19	▲0.41
Margin of victory		66,701	29.68	▲14.35
Turnout		2,24,705	89.23	▲5.99
BJP hold		Swing		

=== 2021 ===
2021 Assam Legislative Assembly election: Hojai
Party	Candidate	Votes	%	±%
BJP	Ramkrishna Ghosh	125,790	56.64	▲2.25
INC	Debabrata Saha	92,008	41.43	▲23.30
NOTA	None of the above	1,724	0.78	▲0.09
Margin of victory		33,782	15.33	▼13.44
Turnout		220,372	83.24	▼2.87
BJP hold		Swing		

=== 2016 ===
2016 Assam Legislative Assembly election: Hojai
Party	Candidate	Votes	%	±%
BJP	Shiladitya Dev	105,615	54.39	▲35.53
AIUDF	Dhaniram Thousen	49,756	25.62	▼6.27
INC	Ardhendu Kumar Dey	35,207	18.13	▼26.26
Independent	Zakir Hussain	1,432	0.73	New entry
NOTA	None of the above	1,342	0.69	New entry
Margin of victory		55,859	28.77	
Turnout		1,94,147	86.11	▲6.85
BJP gain from INC		Swing		

=== 2011 ===
2011 Assam Legislative Assembly election: Hojai
Party	Candidate	Votes	%	±%
INC	Ardhendu Kumar Dey	70,649	44.39	
AIUDF	Dr. Aditya Langthasa	50,755	31.89	
BJP	Shiladitya Dev	30,011	18.86	
AGP	Narayan Chandra Bhowmik	2,623	1.64	
Majority		19,894	12.50	
Turnout		1,59,124	79.26	
INC gain from AIUDF		Swing		

== See also ==
- Hojai
- Hojai district
- List of constituencies of Assam Legislative Assembly
