= Dimaraji =

Dimaraji Dimaland
- Proposed state
- Location in Assam, India
- Coordinates: 25.3°N 93.17°E
- Country: India
- State: Dimaraji

Government
  - Type: Dima Hasao Autonomous Territorial Council

Population (2011)
  - Total: 420,664

Languages
  - Official: Dimasa language
- Time zone: UTC+5:30 (IST)
- Vehicle registration: AS-08

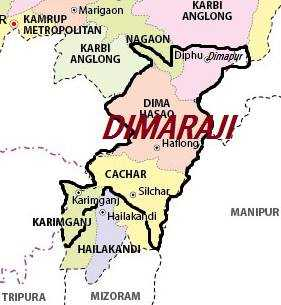
Map of Dimaraji state

Some Dimasa-Cachar people of northeast India have been demanding a separate state called Dimaraji or "Dimaland" for several decades. It would comprise the Dimasa-inhabited areas, namely Dima Hasao district, parts of Cachar district, parts of Nagaon district, Hojai district and Karbi Anglong district in Assam together with part of Dimapur district in Nagaland.

== Proposed boundaries of the state ==
The proposed state's boundaries would include Dima Hasao, Cachar, parts of Nagaon, Hojai, and Karbi Anglong districts of Assam and part of Dimapur in Nagaland.

According to the Dima Halam Daogah chief Dilip Nunisa, the proposed Dimaraji would comprise three districts: existing Dima Hasao, Garampani district and Borail.
