= Ardhendu Kumar Dey =

Indian politician (1938–2022)

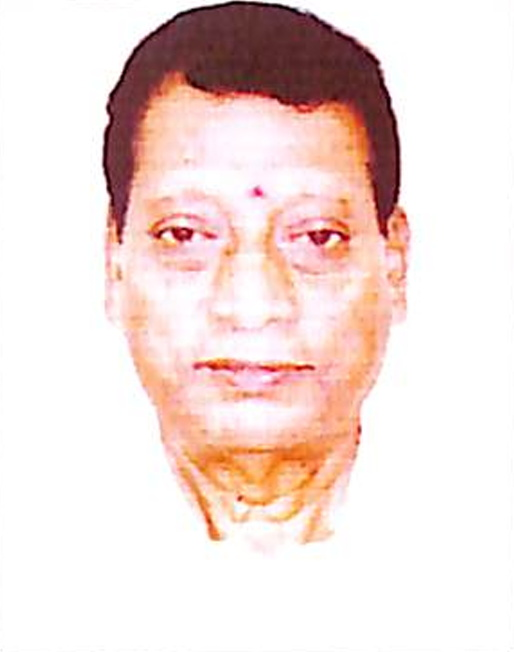

Minister of Irrigation and Soil Conservation in Government of Assam
- In office 30 May 2011 – 19 January 2015
- Preceded by: Nurjamal Sarkar
- Succeeded by: Bhabesh Kalita

Member of Assam Legislative Assembly
- In office 1991–2006
- Preceded by: Santi Ranjan Das Gupta
- Succeeded by: Aditya Langthasa
- Constituency: Hojai
- In office 2011–2016
- Preceded by: Aditya Langthasa
- Succeeded by: Shiladitya Dev
- Constituency: Hojai

Personal details
- Born: 24 March 1938 Badarpur, Assam
- Died: 27 July 2022 (aged 84) Guwahati, Assam, India
- Party: Indian National Congress (1991–2021); Bharatiya Janata Party (2021-2022)
- Spouse: Maya Dey (m. 1966)
- Children: 1
- Parents: Aswini Kumar Dey (father); Hemalata Dey (mother)
- Education: Cotton College; Gauhati University; Calcutta National Medical College
- Profession: Politician, physician

Ardhendu Kumar Dey (24 March 1938 – 27 July 2022) was an Indian politician and Minister of Irrigation and Soil Conservation in the Government of Assam. He was elected to the Assam Legislative Assembly from Hojai constituency from 1991 till 2006 as a member of Indian National Congress (INC). He was re-elected as an MLA from Hojai from 2011 to 2016. In April 2021, he left the INC and joined Bharatiya Janata Party.

== Personal life ==
He was born on 24 March 1938 to Aswini Kumar Dey and Hemalata Dey. He was a resident of Hojai, Assam. In 1966, he married Maya Dey, with whom he had one son.

== Death and reaction ==
=== Death ===
He was admitted to Gauhati Medical College and Hospital (GMCH) where he was undergoing treatment. On 27 July 2022, he died at the same hospital, aged 84.

His mortal remains were taken to his residence at Hojai where the last rites were performed.

=== Reaction ===
Many political figures and leaders including Chief Minister Himanta Biswa Sarma, Minister of Health & Family Welfare Keshab Mahanta, President of AIUDF Badruddin Ajmal, Sirajuddin Ajmal, President of Asom Gana Parishad Atul Bora, President of BJP Assam Bhabesh Kalita, President of Assam Pradesh Congress Committee Bhupen Kumar Borah, National General Secretary of Bharatiya Janata Party Dilip Saikia, Minister of Finance Ajanta Neog, Jayanta Malla Baruah, Pallab Lochan Das and many others expressed condolences at the demise of Dey.

In a statement, Chief Minister Himanta Biswa Sarma said:

Deeply saddened by the demise of veteran leader, former Minister and MLA of Hojai Dr Ardhendu De.

In his long political career, he contributed immensely towards public welfare.

My condolences to the bereaved and prayers for the departed soul. Om Shanti!

— Himanta Biswa Sarma, 27 July 2022
