= Shiladitya Dev =

Indian politician

Member of Assam Legislative Assembly
- In office 2016–2021
- Preceded by: Ardhendu Kumar Dey
- Succeeded by: Ramkrishna Ghosh
- Constituency: Hojai

Personal details
- Born: Guwahati
- Party: Bharatiya Janata Party
- Spouse: Sravani Dev
- Parent: Subodh Chandra Dev (Father)
- Profession: Politician

Shiladitya Dev is an Indian politician and a member of Bharatiya Janata Party. He was elected to the Assam Legislative Assembly in the 2016 election from Hojai constituency.

On 3 April, the Assam BJP issued a show cause notice to Dev after he defied the party by forming the Hojai Municipal Board with the help of MLAs from the All India United Democratic Front, the Indian National Congress, and independents MLAs.

== Controversy ==
Shiladitya from India's ruling Bharatiya Janata Party’s Assam unit termed the creation of Bangladesh a "great mistake".

Because, he argued, Assam has been facing "Muslim influx" for decades, Indian daily The Times of India reported on Tuesday. The controversial comment came at a time when there are tensions in Indian state of Assam over citizenship of Indian Muslims.

The ToI report, titled “India should have annexed Bangladesh: Assam BJP MLA”, said the legislator made the comment while speaking to a local news channel in Nagaon in Assam on 2018.
