= Busu Dima =

Indian cultural festival

Busu Busu Dima
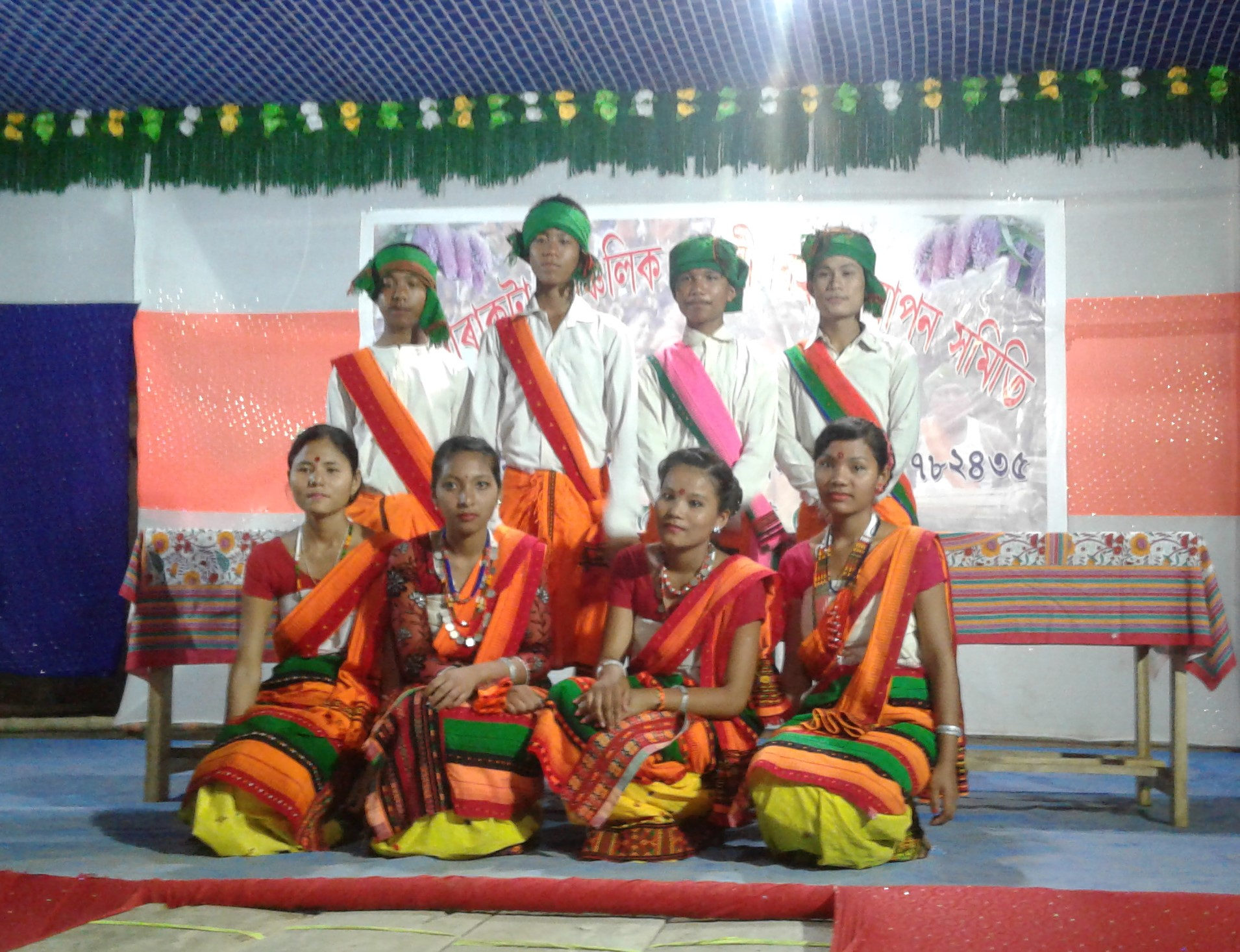
- Nickname: Bishu (Demra dialect)
- Begins: 27 January (for urban areas)
- Ends: 28 January (for urban areas)
- People: Dimasa people

Busu Dima (Bushu Dima) is an annual cultural festival celebrated by the Dimasa Kachari tribe of India. It is the main harvesting festival for Dimasa people. It is celebrated after the completion of grain harvest in different villages. The festival is usually organised in January.

== Festival ==
Busu Dima festival is divided into these three types:

Jidaap
Jidaap is a Busu festival that lasts for 2 days.
Surem Baino
Surem Baino is a Busu festival that is celebrated for a total of five days.
Hangshu Busu
Hangshu Busu, which is celebrated for a total of seven days.

== Dance ==
The festival is followed by singing accompanied by the rhythm of Kharam (drums), Muri (fife) the wooden bugle continues first to third days without stop. The boys and girls, everyone comes and they gather together with their traditional dress whole night by dancing in the festival.
