= Dimasa language =

Sal language of Northeast India

Dimasa
- Grao-Dima
- Native to: India
- Region: Assam, Nagaland
- Ethnicity: Dimasa
- Native speakers: 137,184 (2011 census (Dima Hasao))
- Language family: Sino-Tibetan: Central Tibeto-Burman?; Sal; Boro–Garo; Boroic; Dimasa–Kokborok; Dimasa
- Dialects: Moran
- Writing system: Latin script, Eastern Nagari

Language codes
- ISO 639-3: dis
- Glottolog: dima1251
- ELP: Dimasa

The Dimasa language is a Boroic language spoken by the Dimasa people of the Northeastern Indian states of Assam and Nagaland. The Dimasa language is known to Dimasas as "Grao-Dima" and it is similar to Boro, Kokborok and Garo languages. The Dimasa language is one of the oldest languages spoken in North East India, particularly in Assam, Nagaland.

== Etymology ==
The word Dimasa etymologically translates to Children [sa] of the big river [dima]", i.e. the Tsang, which is known as Brahmaputra by the Assamese. The Dimasa word dzi/Dí, meaning water, forms the root of the names of many of the major rivers of Assam and of North East India in general, such as Dibang (plenty of water), Diyung (huge river), Dikrang (green river), Dikhow (fetched water), and many others. The Brahmaputra is known as Tsangi (the purifier) and Lohit is known as Di Lao (long river) among the Dimasas.

Many of the important towns and cities in Assam and Nagaland received their names from Dimasa words such as Diphu, Maibang, Dimabang (a capital of the Dimasa Kingdom) etc.

== Geographical distribution ==
Dimasa is spoken in:

- Assam: Dima Hasao district (formerly North Cachar Hills district), Cachar district, Karbi Anglong district, West Karbi Anglong district, Nagaon district, Hojai district (formerly a part of Nagaon district)
- Nagaland
- Meghalaya
- Mizoram

== Phonology ==
=== Vowels ===
There are six vowels in Dimasa language.

	Front	Central	Back
Close	i ⟨i⟩		u ⟨u⟩
Mid	e ⟨e⟩	ə ⟨ə⟩	o ⟨o⟩
Open		a ⟨a⟩	

- All vowels can occurs in all three positions, except /ə/ which occurs only medially.

=== Diphthongs ===
Diphthongs
	i	e	o	u
i				iu
e	ei		eo	
a	ai		ao	
o	oi			
u	ui			
ə			əo	

=== Consonants ===
There are sixteen consonants in the Dimasa language.

		Labial	Alveolar	Dorsal	Glottal
Nasal		m ⟨m⟩	n ⟨n⟩	ŋ ⟨ng⟩	
Plosive	aspirated	pʰ ⟨ph⟩	tʰ ⟨th⟩	kʰ ⟨kh⟩	
Plosive	voiced	b ⟨b⟩	d ⟨d⟩	g ⟨g⟩	
Fricative	voiceless		s ⟨s⟩		
Fricative	voiced		z ⟨z⟩		ɦ ⟨h⟩
Approximant		w ⟨w⟩	l ⟨l⟩	j ⟨y⟩	
Vibrant			ɾ ~ r ⟨r⟩		

- Notably, Dimasa lacks tenuis /p t k/ plosives.
- /pʰ tʰ kʰ/ are unreleased [p̚ t̚ k̚] syllable-finally.
- /b d g/ are released and do not occur word-finally.
- /pʰ tʰ kʰ s/ are sometimes voiced [b d g z].
- /m n pʰ tʰ kʰ b l ɾ/ occur in all positions.
- /g s ɦ/ do not occur in native words but occur in loan words.
- /d w j/ do not occur word-finally.
- /ŋ/ does not occur word-initially.

== Grammar ==
Dimasa is an inflectional language. The verbs are inflected for number, tense, case, voice, aspect, mood but not for gender and person.

=== Pronouns ===
	Singular	Plural
First person	ang	jing
Second person	ning	nishi
Third person	bo	bunshi

=== Sentence syntax ===
The verb is rarely inflected for person and gender.

Subject–object–verb word order is usual; Object–verb–subject word order also occurs.

== Writing system ==
Dimasa is written using Latin script, which has been introduced in the lower primary education system in Dima Hasao District. The main guiding force behind it is the Dimasa Lairidim Hosom, a literary apex body of the Dimasa community.

The Bengali script is used in Cachar, where the Bengali people live alongside Dimasas.

== See also ==
- Dimasa people
- Dimaraji
- Dima Hasao
- Busu Dima
- Kachari language
- Dimasa Kachari language
