= Barman language =

Tibeto-Burman language of India

Barman Thar
- বৰ্মন ঠাৰ
- Pronunciation: /bɔɾmɔn thaɾ/
- Native to: Arunachal Pradesh, Assam, Meghalaya, Nagaland
- Region: Northeast India, Kamarupa
- Ethnicity: Barman Kacharis
- Native speakers: 24,000 (2017)
- Language family: Sino-Tibetan: Tibeto-Burman; Sal; Boro–Garo; Barman Thar
- Writing system: Assamese alphabet (presently used); Sylheti Nagri (formerly used)

Language codes
- ISO 639-3: –

Barman Thar (IPA: /bɔɾmɔn t^{h}aɾ/), where “thar” means language, is a highly endangered language. It is a Tibeto-Burman language that belongs to the Boro–Garo sub-group. The population of the Barman Kachari community is 24,237, according to a 2017 census. However, only a small part of this population speaks the language.

== History ==
The Barman Kacharis are an indigenous Assamese community of Northeast India. They are mainly found in the districts of Lower Assam and some parts of Arunachal Pradesh. Barman Kachari is one of the ancient ethnic groups of North-East India. Since the 2002 Amendment act, many Barman Kacharis in Assam are referred to as 'Barman'. They are mainly found in the districts of Udalguri, Baksa, Chirang, Kokrajhar, Darrang, Kamrup, Goalpara, Nagaon, Lakhimpur, Dhemaji

== Demographics ==
The Barman Kacharis number some 24,237 persons, according to a 2017 census. Out of this number, 12,555 are males and 11,503 are females. Their literacy rate is estimated at 4 percent. The level of literacy of males and females is 2.5% and 1.5%, respectively.

== Documentation ==
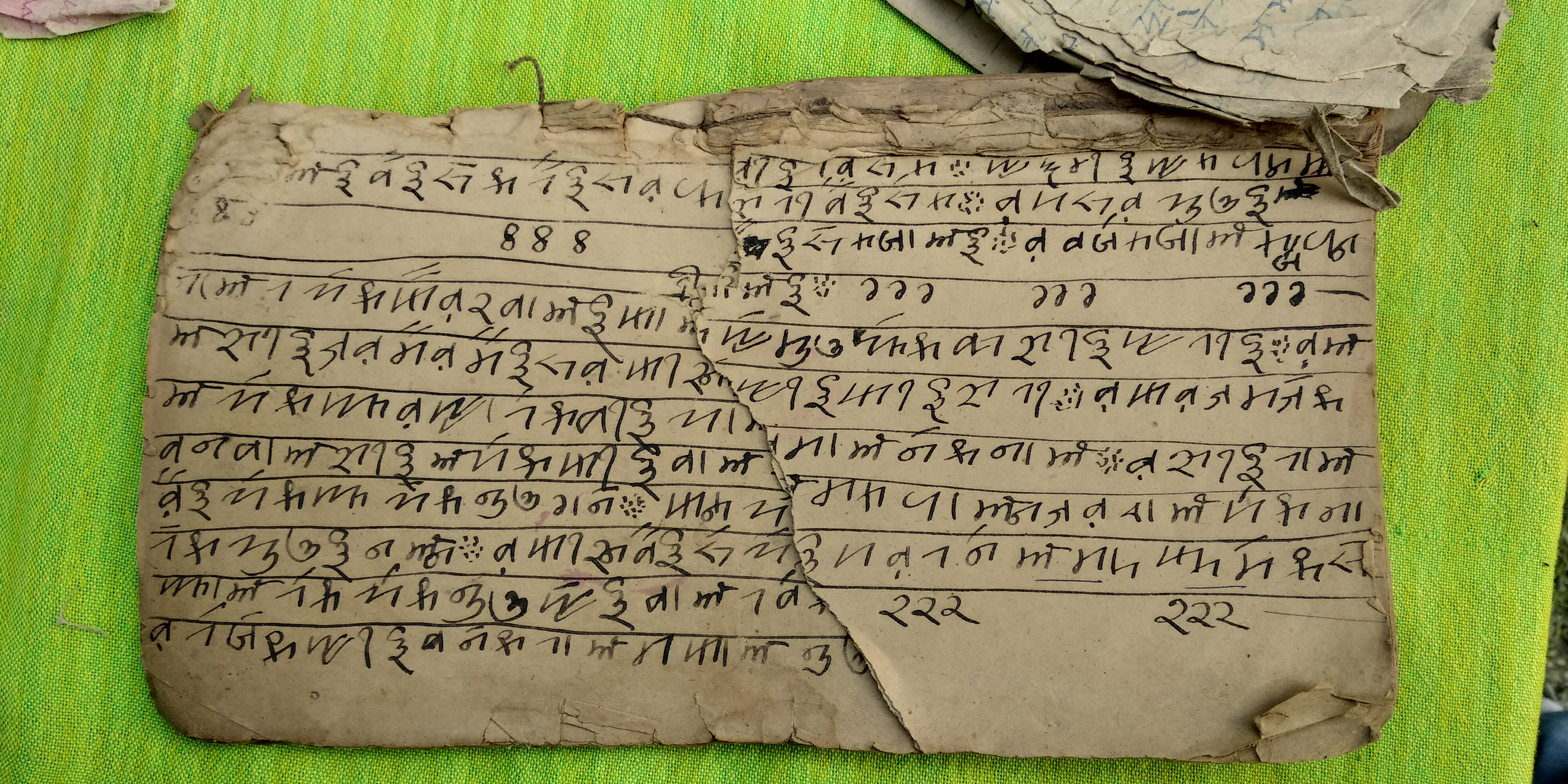
The script of Barman Thar

The language of the Barman Kacharis had never been documented until 2019 when M.A. students in Linguistics and Language Technology (Batch 2018-2020) of Tezpur University carried out field work for the first time on this language.

== Phonology ==
The Barman Thar phonemic inventory consists of eight vowels, nine diphthongs, and twenty consonants (including two semivowels).

=== Consonants ===
In Barman Thar, there are twenty consonants.

	Bilabial		Labio-velar	Alveolar		Palatal		Velar		Glottal
Plosive	p	b		t	d	c		k	ɡ	
Aspirated plosive	p^{h}			t^{h}				k^{h}		
Nasal		m			n				ŋ	
Flap					ɾ					
Fricative				s	z					h
Approximant			w				j			
Lateral approximant					l					

pʰ and z have idiolectal variations. They are, by some people, sometimes pronounced as ɸ and d͡z respectively. For example, the word pʰa (meaning “father”) is sometimes pronounced as ɸa and nɐmza (meaning “bad”) is sometimes pronounced as nɐmd͡za.

==== Gemination ====
Gemination, which is the twinning of two consonants, is also found in the Barman language.

Phonemes	Example (Barman)	English gloss
p+p	tʰɐppɐɾa	“ash”
t+tʰ	mɐttʰai	“big”
d+d	ɡɛddɛl	“new”
c+c	bicci	“egg”
k+k	nukkuruŋ	“eye”
k+kʰ	bɛkkʰuma	“dull”
m+m	dummua	“fever”
n+n	cunna	“cloth”
l+l	mulluk	“earth”

==== Consonant clusters ====
In the study of Barman Thar, carried out by the students of Tezpur University, they found only one word, i.e. bɾui, with a consonant cluster. It is a cluster of two consonants, b and ɾ. And they found no final cluster in any word.

=== Vowels ===
In Barman Thar, there are eight vowels and nine diphthongs.

==== Monophthongs ====
	Front	Central	Back
High	i		u
Close-mid	e		o
Open-mid	ɛ		ɔ
Near-open		ɐ	
Open	a		

==== Diphthongs ====
	i	u	a
i			ia
o	oi	ou	
ɐ	ɐi		
e	ei		
u	ui		ua
a	ai	au	

== Morphology and grammar ==
Case:

	Case	Marker	Examples
1.	(a) Nominative (b) Ergative	(a) ∅ (b) a	ɾam hibaja ɾam-∅ hiba-ja Ram-NOM come-PST “Ram has come.” ɾama thɛkasu caja ɾam-a thɛkasu ca-ja Ram-ERG mango eat-PST “Ram has eaten a mango.”
2.	Accusative	kɔ	ɾamkɔ ɾiɡɐm Ram-ACC call “Call Ram.”
3.	(a) Instrumental (b) Comitative	ca nɛ nɔɡɛ	owa khɐttaica thɛkasu-kɔ dɛnnaja owa khɐttai-ca thɛkasu-kɔ dɛn-naja 3SG knife-INS mango cut-PST “S/he has cut (the) mango ɐŋa ɔmɾitnɛ nɔɡɛ hiŋgɐn ɐŋa ɔmɾit-nɛ nɔɡɛ hiŋ-gɐn 1SG Amrit-GEN INS go-FUT “I will go with Amrit.”
	Genitive	nɛ	ɔmɾitnɛ nɔk ɔmɾit-nɛ nɔk Amrit-GEN house “Amrit's house”
	Locative	ou	ɐŋa tɛzpuɾou dɔŋa ɐŋa tɛzpuɾ-ou dɔŋ-a 1SG Tezpur-LOC be-PRS “I am in Tezpur.”
6.	(a) Intentive dative (b) Destinational dative	nɛ nɛɡa ca	ɔmɾitnɛ nɛɡa ɔmɾit-nɛ nɛɡa Amrit-GEN DAT “… for Amrit.” tɛzpuɾca tɛzpuɾ-ca Tezpur-DAT “… to Tezpur.”
7.	Ablative	nɛ tukki	tɛzpuɾnɛ tukki tɛzpuɾ-nɛ tukki Tezpur-GEN ABL “… from Tezpur.”

=== Tense and aspect ===
Three of the tenses are morphologically marked in Barman Thar.

Present:	owa hiŋa owa hiŋ-a 3SG go-PRS “S/he goes.”
Past:	owa caja owa ca-ja 3SG eat-PST “S/he ate.”
Future:	owa ɾiŋɡɐn owa ɾiŋ-ɡɐn 3SG drink-FUT “S/he will drink.”

In Barman Thar, the present tense is marked with the suffix “-a”, the past tense, with “-ja” and the future tense, with “-ɡɐn”. And the following are the four aspects:

Present perfect:	owa hibadɔ owa hiba-dɔ 3SG come-PRS.PRF “S/he has come.”
Present continuous:	owa hiŋa owa hiŋ-dɔŋ 3SG go-PRS.PROG “S/he is going.”
Past perfect:	owa caniŋ owa ca-niŋ 3SG eat-PST.PRF “S/he had eaten.”
Future continuous:	owa ɾiŋdɔŋɡɐn owa ɾiŋ-dɔŋ-ɡɐn 3SG drink-PROG-FUT “S/he will be drinking.”

Pronouns
		Singular	Plural
1st		ɐŋa	ciŋa
2nd		nɐŋ	nɐtɐŋ
2nd	honorific	nɐtɐŋ	nɐŋɐtɐŋ
3rd		owa	otɐŋ
3rd	honorific	otɐŋ	otɐŋ

=== Negation ===
In Barman Thar, verbs are negated by suffixing “-za” and “-zia” for present and past tense respectively.

For example, the root word for the verb “eat” in Barman Thar is “ca”. The negative form of the word in the present tense is caza (ca+za), meaning “do/does not eat” and that in the past tense is cazia (ca+zia), meaning “did not eat”.

Again, in case of imperative sentences, the suffix -nɔŋ is use.

For example, mei canɔŋ means “Don't eat rice.” [mei means “rice”, and canɔŋ is bi-morphemic, formed by the root word for “eat”, i.e. ca, and the imperative negative marker -nɔŋ.]

=== Classifiers ===
In Barman Thar, there is one classifier, i.e. -ja.

doisaja sijai hiŋaja
doisa-ja sija-i hiŋ-(a)ja
boy-CL die-PFV go-PST
"The boy died."

=== Allomorphs ===
Another feature of this language that needs to be mentioned is the presence of allomorphs.

Allomorphs of the past tense marker:

-ja is the past tense marker. But when this morpheme is suffixed to a verb ending in [m], it becomes -maja. For example, cum + -ja = cummaja. When it is suffixed to a verb ending in [n], it becomes -naja as in dɛn + -ja = dɛnnaja. When it is affixed to a verb ending in [ŋ], it becomes -aja, as in hiŋaja (hiŋ + -ja).

Therefore, it can be said that -maja, -naja and -aja are allomorphs of the morpheme -ja.

Allomorphs of the ergative case marker:

-a is the ergative case marker in Barman Thar. However, when it is affixed to a noun ending in a vowel, it becomes -ja. For example, sita + -ja = sitaja.

So, -ja is an allomorph of the ergative case marker -a.

== Bibliography ==
- DeLancey, Scott (2012). Hyslop, Gwendolyn; Morey, Stephen; W. Post, Mark (eds.). "On the Origin of Bodo-Garo". Northeast Indian Linguistics. 4: 3–20. doi:10.1017/UPO9789382264521.003. ISBN 9789382264521.
- Joseph, U. V., and Burling, Robbins. 2006. Comparative phonology of the Boro Garo languages. Mysore: Central Institute of Indian Languages Publication.
- Burling, Robbins (2003). "The Tibeto-Burman languages of northeast India". In Thurgood, Graham; LaPolla, Randy J. (eds.). The Sino-Tibetan languages. London: Routledge. pp. 169–191. ISBN 978-0-7007-1129-1.
- van Driem, George (2001). Languages of the Himalayas: An Ethnolinguistic Handbook of the Greater Himalayan Region. BRILL. ISBN 978-90-04-12062-4.
- Wood, Daniel Cody (2008). An Initial Reconstruction of Proto-Boro-Garo (MA thesis). University of Oregon. hdl:1794/9485.
