= Ramkrishna Ghosh =

Indian politician

- ৰামকৃষ্ণ ঘোষ

Member of Assam Legislative Assembly
- Incumbent
- Assumed office 21 May 2021
- Preceded by: Shiladitya Dev
- Constituency: Hojai

Personal details
- Party: Bhartiya Janata Party (present)
- Spouse: Smt. Aparna Ghosh
- Children: 1 (Daughter)
- Parent: Late Nani Gopal Ghosh (Father)
- Education: Gauhati University(MA)
- Occupation: Member of Assam Legislative Assembly

Ramkrishna Ghosh is an Indian politician and a member of Bharatiya Janata Party. He was elected to the Assam Legislative Assembly from 91 No. Hojai constituency in the 2021 Assam Legislative Assembly election.

== Early life ==
Ramkrishna Ghosh is the son of Late Nani Gopal Ghosh. He is married to Aparna Ghosh, and they have a daughter.
