= Greater Punjab Movement, India =

Punjabi political movement

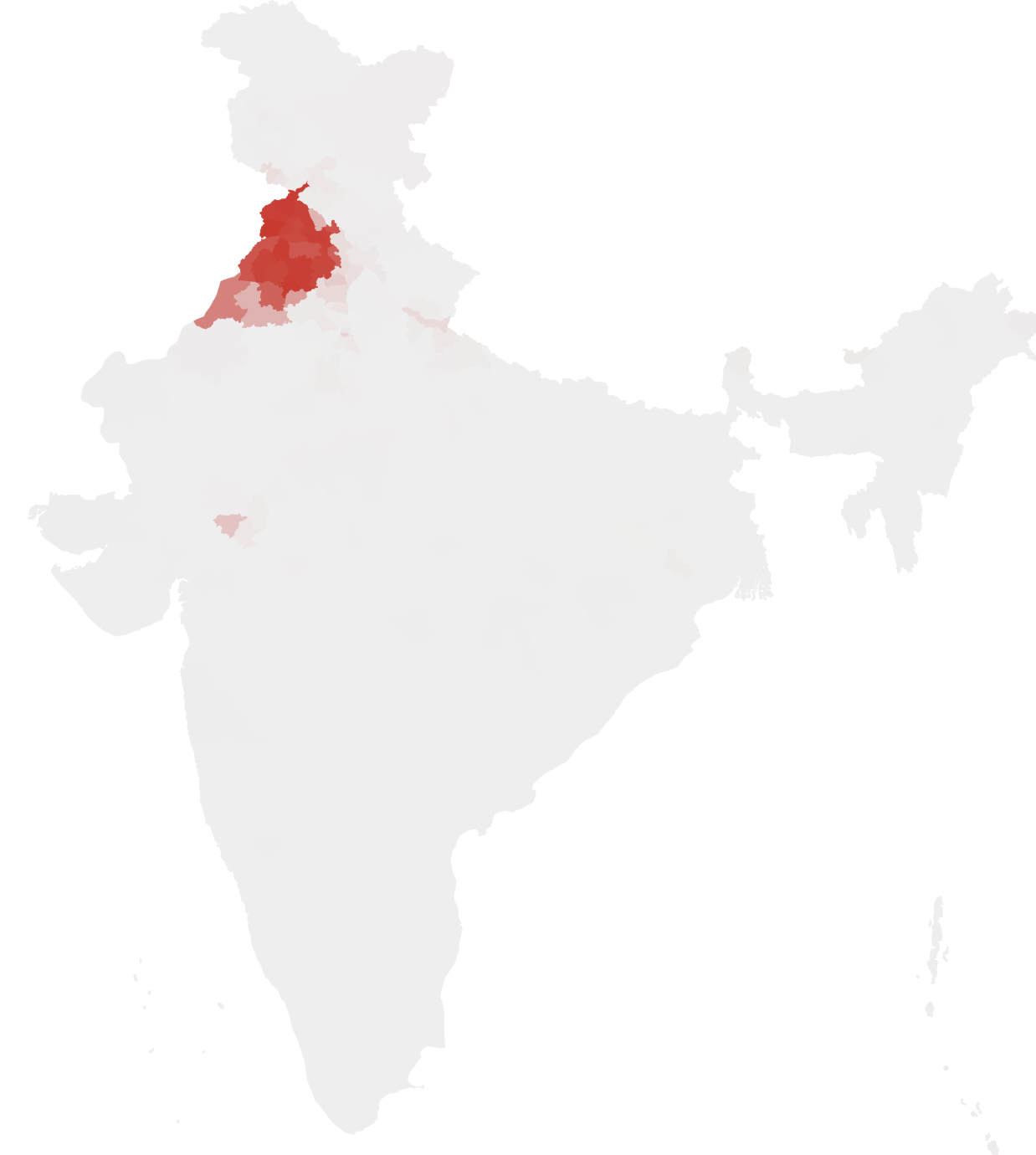
Indian Punjab and its neighbouring Punjabi-speaking areas.

The proposed Greater Punjab movement is a regional political demand that includes political activities organised by various individuals, Punjabi organizations and political parties like native Akali Dal party of current Indian Punjab, for expansionism of current Indian Punjab by incorporating the neighboring Punjabi-speaking areas of Haryana, Himachal Pradesh, Rajasthan and Union Territory of Chandigarh, within the republic of India, with Chandigarh as its proposed capital. The proposed Greater Punjab state corresponds to the five districts of Haryana, three districts of Himachal Pradesh, two districts of Rajasthan and Chandigarh city as a whole.

== Expansion demand ==
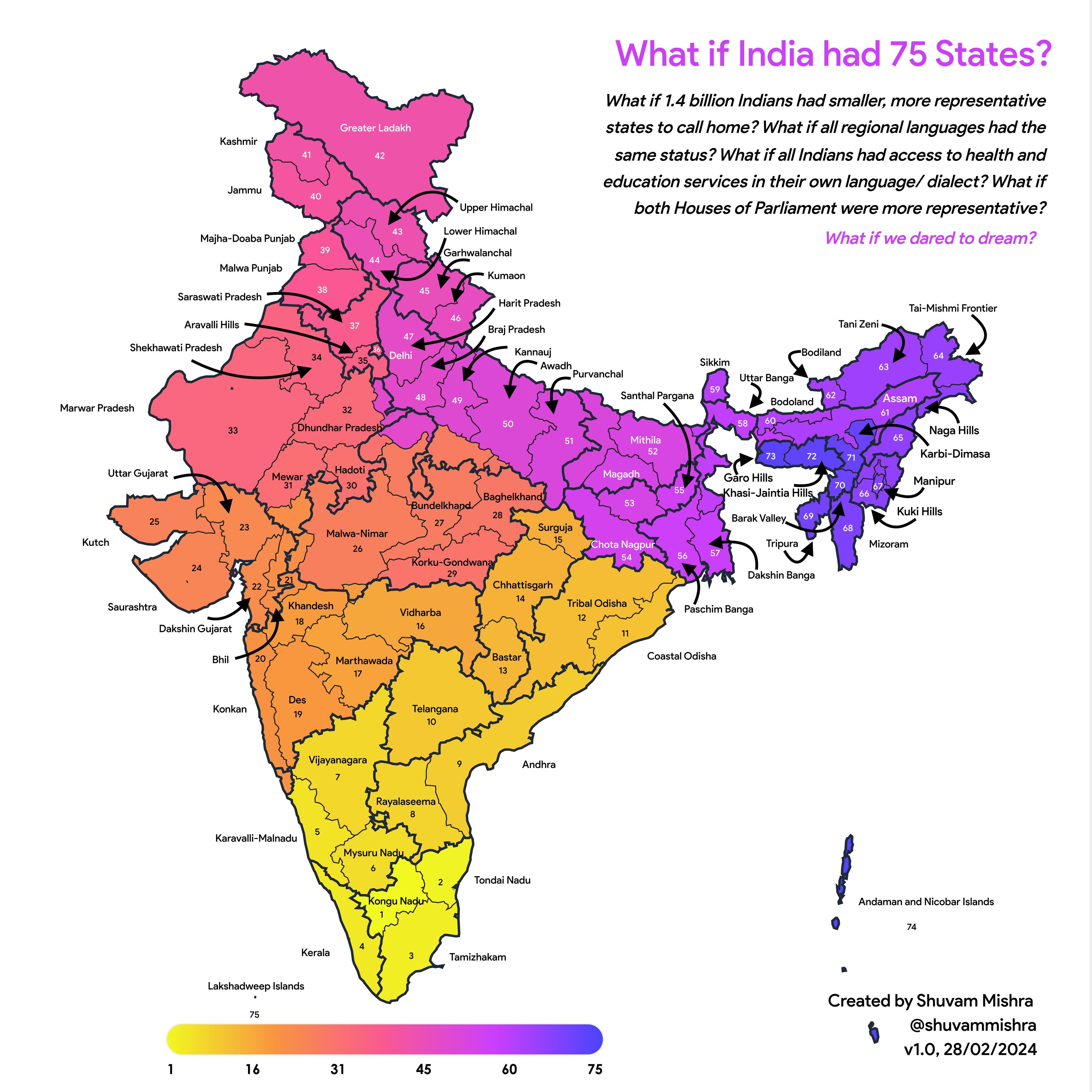
Proposed Greater Punjab (Punjab expansion) map marked in light green, lies between the proposed Maru Pradesh and Jammu.

The Native Punjab mainstream Akali Dal party time to time have demanded to the Central Government of India to incorporate the neighbouring Punjabi-speaking areas of Himachal Pradesh's (Bilaspur, Dalhousie, Kangra, Sirmaur, Solan and Una), Haryana's (Ambala, Fatehabad, Hisar, Jind, Kaithal, Karnal, Kurukshetra, Panchkula, Sirsa and Yamunanagar), Rajasthan's (Hanumangarh and Sri Ganganagar districts) mxand Union territory of Chandigarh city to current Punjab, India for its expansionism by quoting that those areas historically belongs to the land of Punjab and that States Reorganisation Commission under Punjab Reorganisation Act of 1966 have failed to delivered justice at that time by not incorporating those areas with Indian Punjab even after knowing that those regions are linguistically, ethnically, geographically and culturally similar to Indian Punjab in every aspects.
