= Barmans in Cachar =

The Dimasa speaking community (Dimasa language speakers) of Cachar (Assam, India) are known as Barman, forming one of the indigenous tribes of undivided Cachar (including Dima-Hasao, Hailakandi and Karimganj). They are officially recognized as one of the Scheduled Tribes under the plains category in Assam in the name called “Barmans in Cachar”.

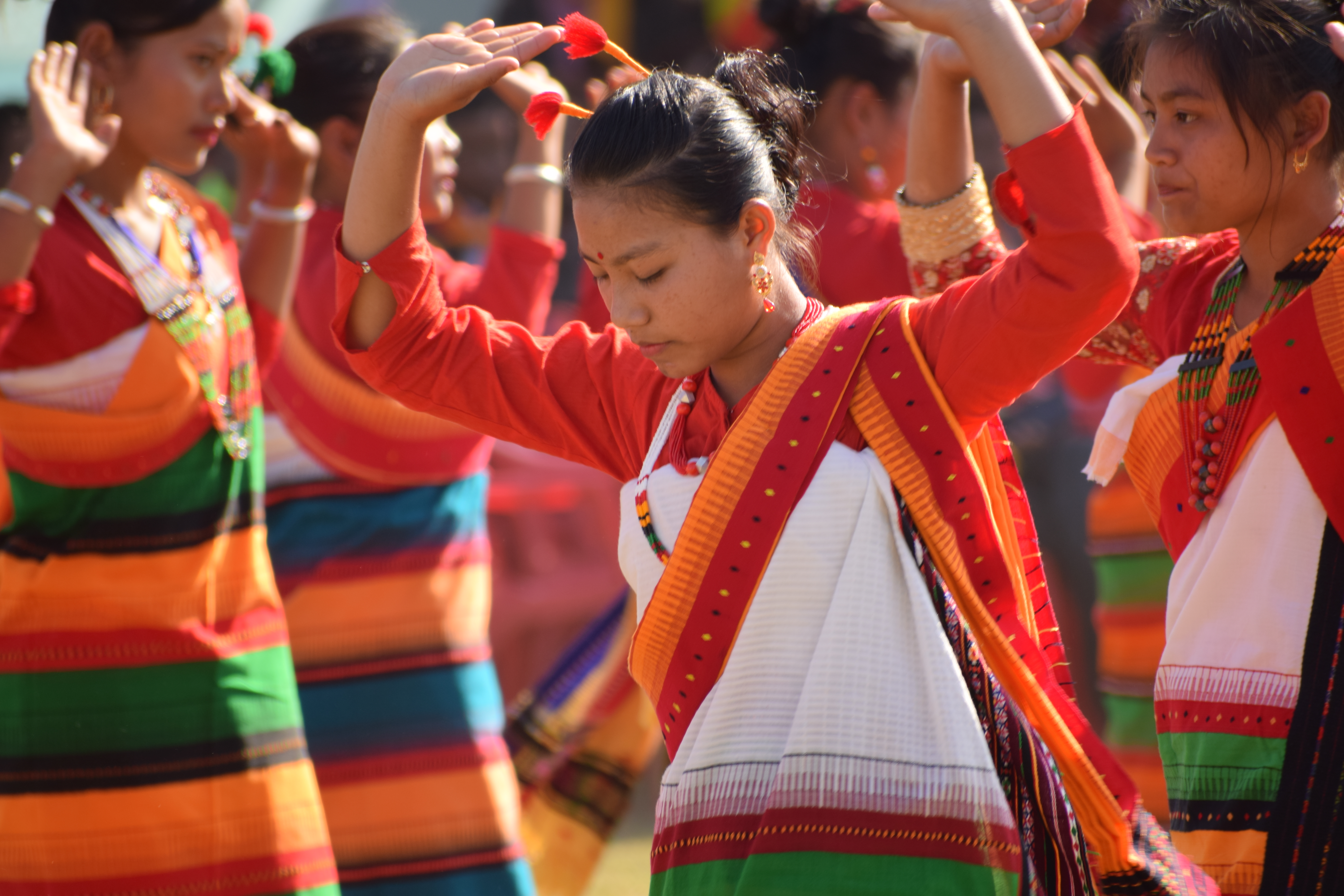
Barman Dimasa damsel performing Baidima, the traditional dance.

As per population census 2024 prepared by existing "Barman Dimasa Kachari Development Council" the total population of Barman Dimasa Kachari (outside sixth schedule area) was 97,904 in five districts of Assam: Cachar, Karimganj, Hailakandi, Hojai and Nagaon.

== Historical Background ==
It is worth sharing that linguistically Dimasa, Koch, Bodo, Kokborok, Deori, Garo, Rabha, and Tiwa are cognate groups. Shafer (1955: 107) classified them under Barish Section (aka Boro-Garo) of Baric Division language family. Grierson, in his work, shared "it said that some 200 years ago, the Raja of Hill Tipperah, when giving his daughter in marriage to the Raja of Maibang in the North Cachar (present Dima Hasao), gave her a dowry the Surma Valley in what is now known as the district of Cachar.". In the sixteenth century, a Koch principality was established in Khaspur by Chilarai, who made it a “crown colony” of Koch Behar under Uparaja, who later declared his independence and formed the Kingdom of Khaspur. However, since the beginning of the eighteenth century, this Kingdom was declining; its last ruler Bhimsingha, was growing old with no male heir. His only daughter Kanchani, was given in marriage to the Dimasa prince Lakshmi Chandra in 1745 A.D. Shortly after the demise of Bhimsingha, the two states (Maibang and Khaspur) were merged, and the capital of Dimasas was shifted from Maibang to Khaspur, near Silchar, the Cachar valley or South Cachar (aka Barak Valley) became the core area of the Dimasa state. The North Cachar Hills (present Dima-Hasao) was administered by a Dimasa governor and Central Cachar (Nagaon portion) through an Aditya or Sezwal. Members of the royal family and a large number of the aristocracy moved to the plains of Cachar. The aristocracy which settled in Cachar formed a Hindu caste called BARMAN and consecrated as Kshatriya by Brahmanas and allowed to put on sacred threads (Janeo). Thus, Barman is a Hindu name of Dimasa.

== Religion ==
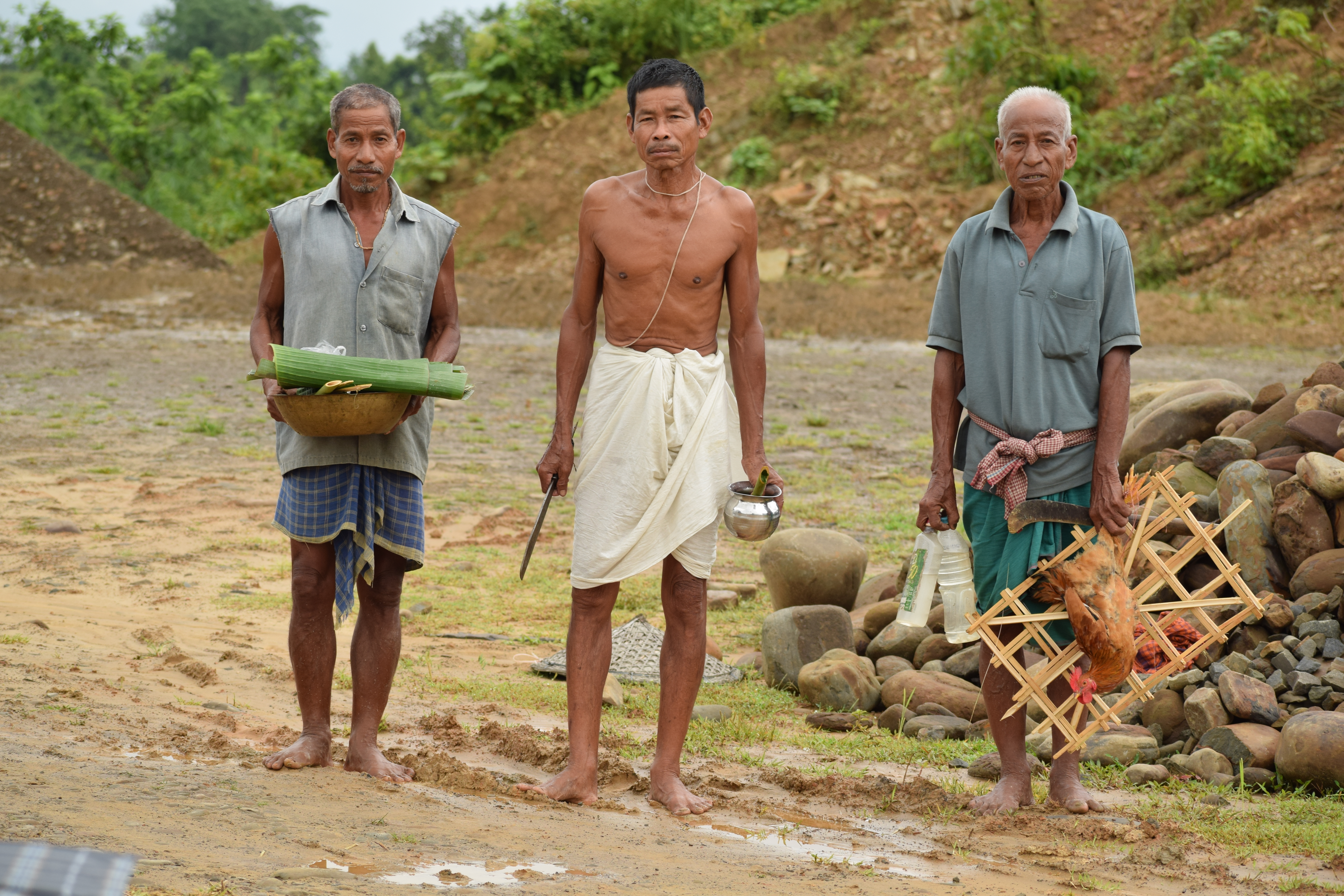
Hojai, the Dimasa Priest (in the middle) with Baruwa (assistant priest) and Dangjuruya/Deori (assistant priest).

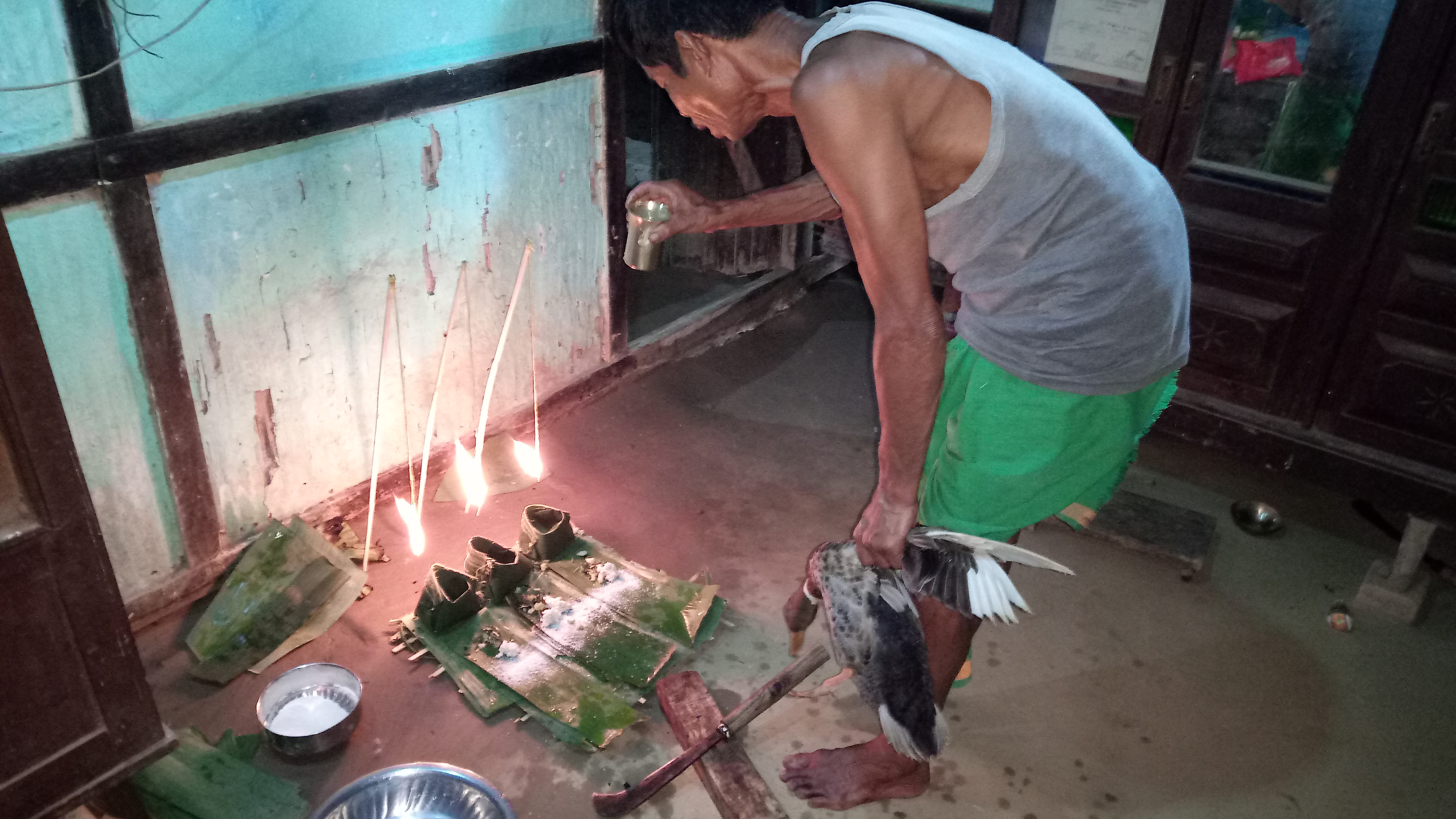
Dimasa Priest while performing their age old traditional ritual.

They came close to the mainstream of the Sanatana (aka Hindu) religious life by replacing their many age-old customs and rituals with Sanatana practices, later they were grouped to Kshatriya and referred to as Barman. Even then they retained some of their age old animistic customs and rituals which they still practice. Like most of the indigenous peoples, the animistic perspective is so inherent that they do not even have a word in their language that corresponds to "Animism" (the term, which is an anthropological construct).

== Demographics ==
The Barmans of cachar number some 21,747 persons, forming 0.6% of Barak Valley's population, according to 2011 Census. They are mainly found in Upper Cachar's (most particularly in an around Khaspur area where once their Kachari kingdom stood) respectively.

Whereas, Dimasa people in North Cachar Hills are known by the name of Dimasa Kachari people, numbering 74,502 persons, thus constituting around 35% of the district's population.

== Language ==
The mother tongue of Barmans is Dimasa. From the four major dialects of Dimasa, i.e., Hasao, Hawar, Dembra and Dizuwa (aka Dijuha), the Barmans speak the Hawar dialect. Linguistically, it comes under Barish (aka Bodo-Garo or Bodo-Koch) section of Baric (aka Sal or Bodo-Konyak-Jinghpaw) division of Tibeto-Burman language family.

== Clans ==
The Barmans of Cachar have 40 patri clans called Sengphong /seŋpoŋ/ and 42 matri clans called Julu /zulu/. Both clans are exogamous in nature apart from the matrimonial relationship. A male member of Barmans inherits his father's Sengphong and mother's Julu (aka Jilik) but he handed down only the Sengphong to his lineage, not his Julu. Similarly, a female member inherits both the clans from parents but she handed down only one clan, that is, her mother's Julu.
