= Kachari language =

Sal language of Assam, India

Kachari
- কছাৰী
- Region: Assam, India
- Native speakers: 16,000 (2011)
- Language family: Sino-Tibetan: Central Tibeto-Burman?; Sal; Boro–Garo; Boroic; Tiwa–Boro; Boro–Mech–Kachari; Kachari

Language codes
- ISO 639-3: xac
- Glottolog: kach1279
- ELP: Kachari

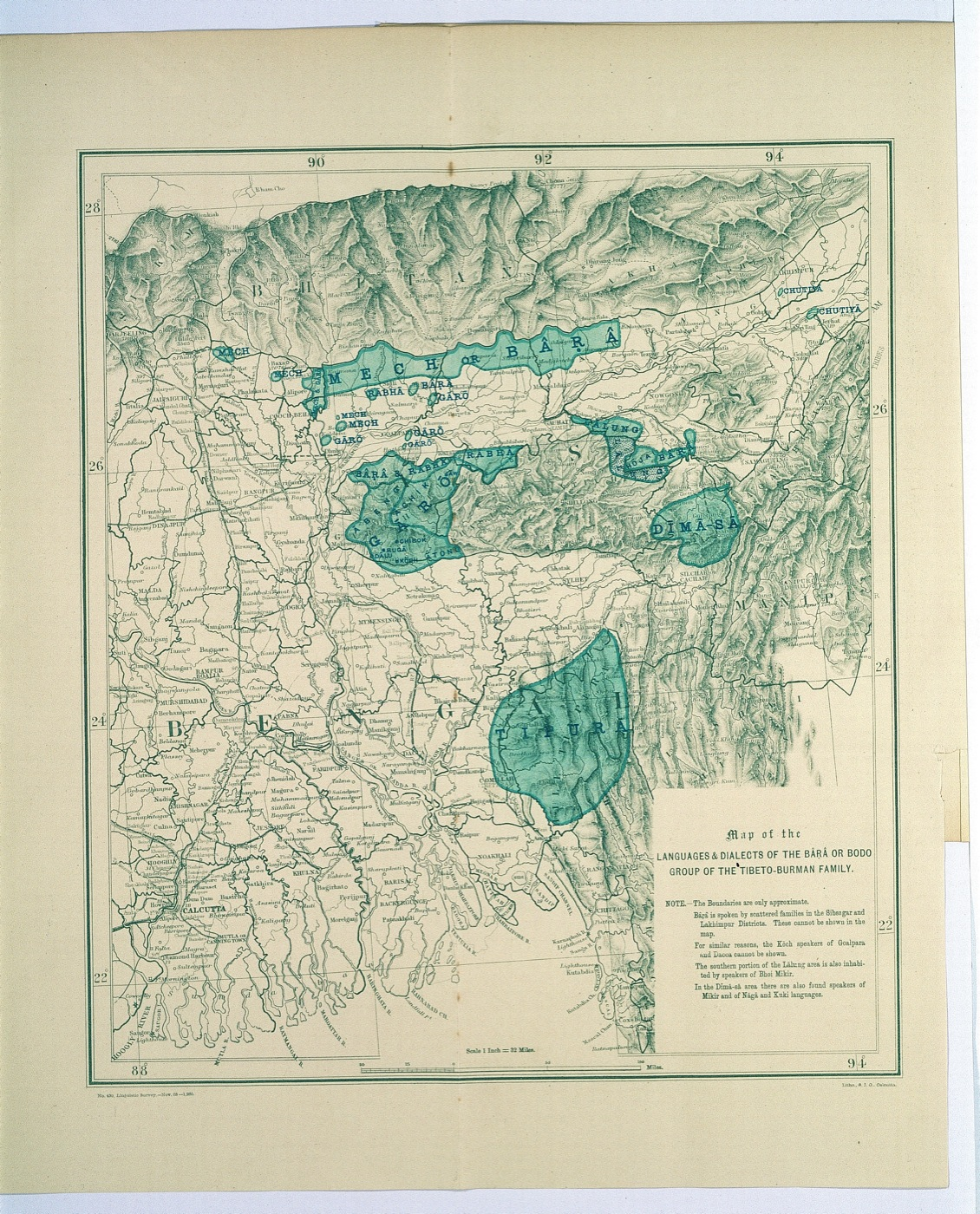
G.A. Grierson's linguistic map of Tibeto-Burman family, 1903.

Kachari is a Sino-Tibetan language of the Boro-Garo branch that is spoken in Assam, India. With fewer than 60,000 speakers recorded in 1997, and the Asam 2001 Census reporting a literacy rate of 81% the Kachari language is currently ranked as threatened. Kachari is closely related to surrounding languages, including Tiwa, Rābhā, Kochi and Mechi.

While there are still living adult speakers, many children are not learning Kachari as their primary language, instead being assimilated into the wider Assamese speaking communities.

== Division ==
According to LSI, Kachari language was divided into Plain Kachari or Bårå(Boro) and Hill Kachari or Dimasa.

== Phonology ==
=== Consonants ===
Kachari consists of the 13 consonants shown below and three Non-syllabics,(Frictional: h, frictionless palatal: y, frictionless rounded velar: w) :

	Bi-Labial	Denti-Alveolar	Alveolo-Palatal	Velar
Plosives: aspirated; unaspirated	p^h b	t^h d		k^h g
Nasals	m	n		n
Fricatives: Voiceless; Voiced			s z	
Tremulant		r		
Lateral		l		

=== Vowels ===
	Front	Central	Back
High	i		u
Mid	e	o	o
Low		a	

=== Prosody ===
- Tone
  - Kachari is a tonal language, consisting of 4 tones high, mid, low and neutral (1, 2, 3, 0)

== Grammar ==
=== Syntax ===
==== The word order of Kachari is Subject-Object-Verb (SOV) ====
Kachari uses many instances of "compound words" to denote meaning. For example, the word for "boy", is really the combination of the Kachari words for "male" and "child". This also correlates with Kachari verbs, which can be agglutinated to form "compound verbs". While Kachari is not polysynthetic, its verbs act as a stem for descriptive adjective, adverbs or affixes to change its meaning. For example, the "conjugation of the regular verb active, 'nu-nǔ.' to see" results in the following:

Verb "to See"
Case	Case Form	Final Form	Meaning
Infinitive	-nǔ	nu-nǔ	to see
Progressive	-dang	nu-dang	I am seeing
Simple Past	-bai	nu-bai	I saw
Past Progressive	-dangman	nu-dangman	I did see
Past Remote	-nai	nu-nai	I had seen
Past Remote	-dangman	nu-dangman	I had seen
Simple Future	-gan	nu-gan	I will see
Paulo-post Future	-si-gan	nu-si-gan	I will see (almost immediately)
Paulo-post Future	-nǔ-sǔi	nu-nǔ-sǔi	I will see (almost immediately)
Imperative	-	nu	See (you)
Imperative	-thang	nu-thang	Let him (them) see

=== Tense ===
==== Future Tense ====
As can be seen from the chart above, the future tense is indicated with -gan, while -si- indicates that the future event will occur soon or in the near future. One example is "Bí faigan", he will come, as opposed to "Bí faisigan", he will come (almost at once) or he is about to come.

Present Tense

Present tense is shown through three affixes, "ǔ", "dong" and "gô". The first two forms represent indefinite and definite forms and are far more common that "gô", which is frequently only used to answer questions in the affirmative.

=== Adjectives ===
Most adjectives can be added both before or after the noun it is describing, though it gains the case ending if it follows the noun, rather than precedes it. This follows the identification of as a strongly suffixing language. However, this classification goes against Konwar's description of Kachari and a related language, Karbi, as primarily prefixing to create adjectives.

Numerical adjectives are always inserted after the noun it is describing. For example, "ten goats" is "Burmá má-zǔ" with "Burmá" meaning goat, "má" being the classifier for "animal" and the number ten being "zǔ".

=== Morphology ===
Gender - Common nouns such as father, mother, brother or sister have distinct masculine and feminine words while other nouns including animals, will typically have the words for male and female, -jelá and -jeu respectively, added on as a suffix to denote gender. Other common masculine and feminine suffix forms that may be used include -zǎlá/-zǔ, -bundā/-bundi, -bóndá/-bóndi, -phántá/-phánti and -pherá/-pheri.

=== Number System ===
Kachari has a decimal system and counts to 10 with unique words, after which the number words combine to add to the larger number as shown in the chart below.

1. sé	21. nɯizise
2. nɯí	22. nɯizinɯi
3. tʰám	22. nɯizitʰam
4. brɯí	24. nɯizibrɯi
5. bá	25. nɯiziba
6. dɔ́	26. nɯizidɔ
7. sní	27. nɯizisni
8. daín	28. nɯizidain
9. ɡú	29. nɯiziɡu
10. zí	30. tʰamzí
11. zíse	40. brɯizí
12. zínɯi	50. bazí
13. zítʰám	60. dɔzí
14. zíbrɯi	70. snizí
15. zíba	80. dainzí
16. zídɔ	90. ɡuzí
17. zísni	100. zɯusé / sezɯú
18. zídaín	200. nɯizɯú
19. zíɡu	1000. sé rɯ̀za
20. nɯizí	2000. nɯí rɯ̀za

== Bibliography ==
- Jacquesson, François (2008). "Discovering Boro-Garo" (PDF). History of an Analytical and Descriptive Linguistic Category. Archived from the original (PDF) on 3 August 2019.
- DeLancey, Scott (2012). Hyslop, Gwendolyn; Morey, Stephen; w. Post, Mark (eds.). "On the Origin of Bodo-Garo". Northeast Indian Linguistics. 4: 3–20. doi:10.1017/UPO9789382264521.003. ISBN 9789382264521.
- Joseph, U.V., and Burling, Robbins. 2006. Comparative phonology of the Boro Garo languages. Mysore: Central Institute of Indian Languages Publication.
- Wood, Daniel Cody. 2008. An Initial Reconstruction of Proto-Boro-Garo. M.A. Thesis, University of Oregon.
