= Dimasa people =

Ethnolinguistic group in Assam and Nagaland, India

Dimasa Kachari
Dimasa
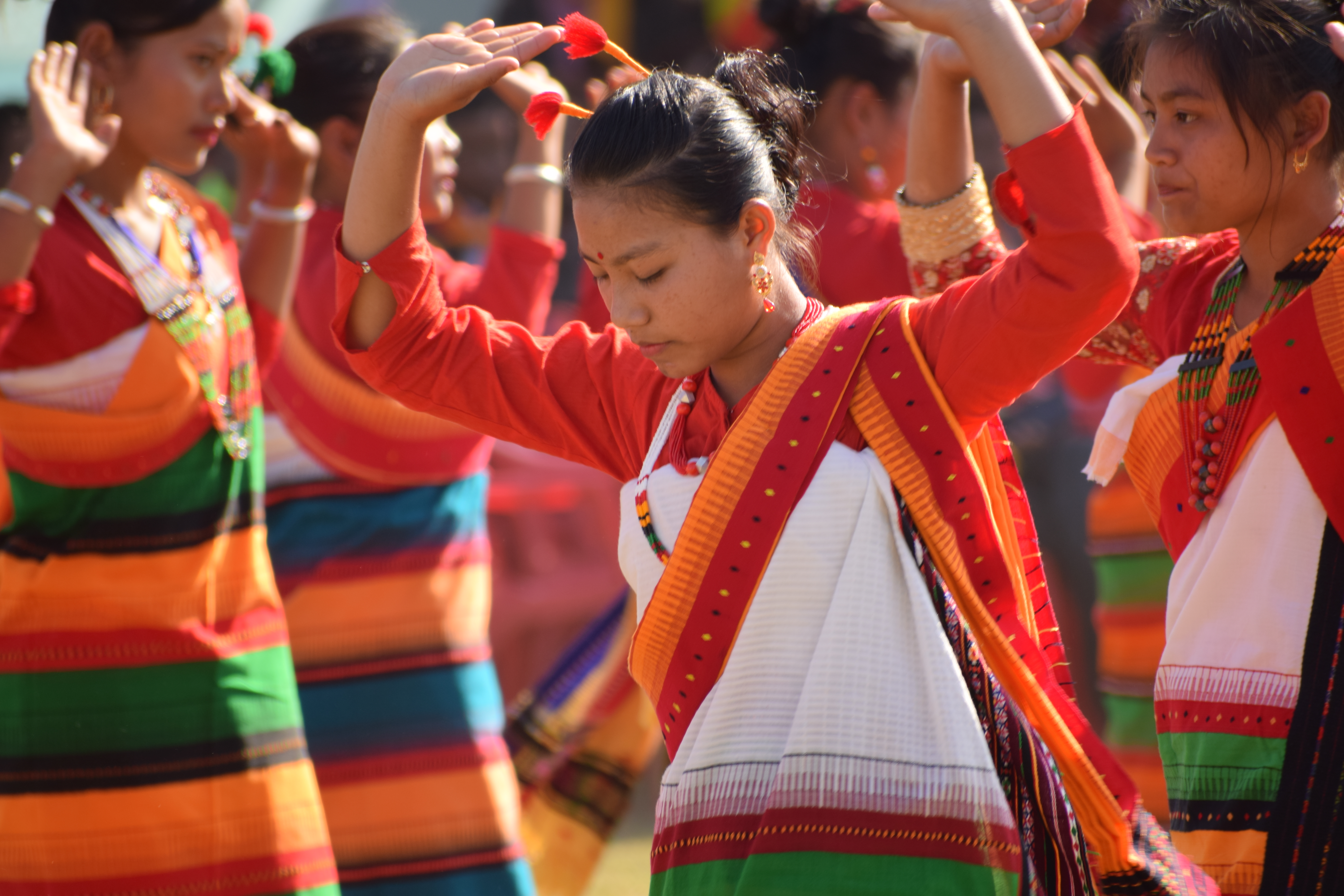
- Barman Dimasa girls perform Baidima, the traditional dance of Dimasa.

Total population
- 262,413 (2011 Census)

Regions with significant populations
- India (Assam): 142,961 (2011, Dimasa-Kachari, in hill districts of Assam only)

Languages
- Dimasa

Religion
- Predominantly:Suaithai/Sowaithai, Dimasa folk religion (Folk religion); Minority: syncretism of Suaithai & Hinduism by Dimasas of Cachar; For more details, see Religion

Related ethnic groups
- other Tibeto-Burman peoples (Chakma people, Naga, Chin, Jinpho, Tripuri, Bamar)

The Dimasa people or Dimasa Kachari people are an ethnolinguistic community presently inhabiting in Assam and Nagaland states in Northeastern India. They speak Dimasa, a Tibeto-Burman language. This community is fairly homogeneous and exclusive, with members required to draw from both parents' separate clans. The Dimasa kingdom, one of many early states in Assam following the downfall of Kamarupa kingdom, was established by these people.

The Dimasas are one of the oldest inhabitants of the Northeastern part of India and are one of the many Kachari tribes.

Dimasa appear to be one of the earliest indigenous ethnic groups of northeastern India. They are a part of the greater Bodo-Kachari family of ethnolinguistic groups of Northeast India which includes the Boro, Tripuri, Rabha, Garo, Tiwa, Koch, Moran etc. peoples. They speak Dimasa, a Boro-Garo language of the Tibeto-Burman family.

== Etymology ==
It stands for Di-ma-sa meaning people of big waters referring to the stream of upper tributary of Brahmaputra i.e. Lohit (known as Dilao in Dimasa), which is in Arunachal today. There is also an endonym within the tribe called as Ha-Tseng-Tsa or Ha-Cheng-Sa meaning people of the soil/sand. Ha-Tseng-Sa could have been the original name of the tribe before setting down in the valley between Dilao (Lohit) and Tsang river (Brahmaputra). This is reflected in the folk lores of Dimasa royal clans as well as in the descent and titles of the King.

== History ==
Ancient Dimasa tradition maintains that sixty thousand (60,000) Moon months (Lunar months) ago, they left their ancestral land when it suffered a severe drought. After long wandering, they settled at Di-lao-bra Tsangi-bra, the confluence of the Dilao (Lohit river) and Sangi or Di-tsang (Brahamputra), they were instrumental in establishing the Dimasa kingdom.

== Cultivation ==
The Dimasas were till recently agricultural, centering on shifting agriculture; but in recent times this has changed with profound changes in the community. Following political problems in the 18th century, the Dimasa ruler moved further south in the plains of Cachar and there took place a division among them–with the hills Dimasa maintaining their traditional living and political exclusiveness, the plains Dimasas have made no attempt to assert themselves.

== Ethnicity ==
Based on cultural and religious differences, The Dimasa people are classified into two separate groups. The Dimasas of highlands are recognized officially as "Dimasa" in documents while the Dimasa diaspora in the plains of Cachar who converted to Hinduism in 19th century are known as Barmans and formally recognized as "Barmans in Cachar" by Government to distinguish them from Barman Kacharis, a distinct group living in western Assam. The Dimasas, inhabiting in the Cachar district are officially recognized as one of the Scheduled Tribes under the plains category in Assam in the name called “Barmans in Cachar”.

== Distribution ==
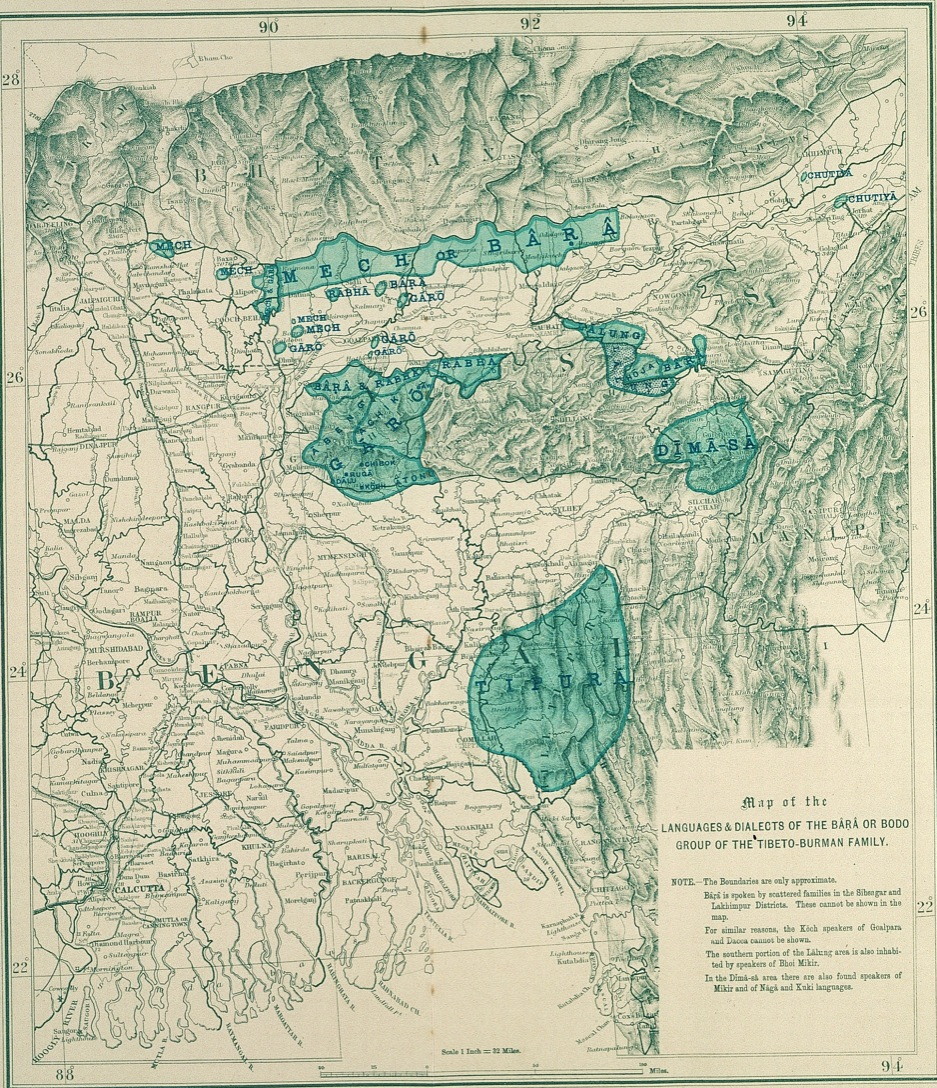
Distribution of Dimasa, as reported in the Language Survey of India 1903

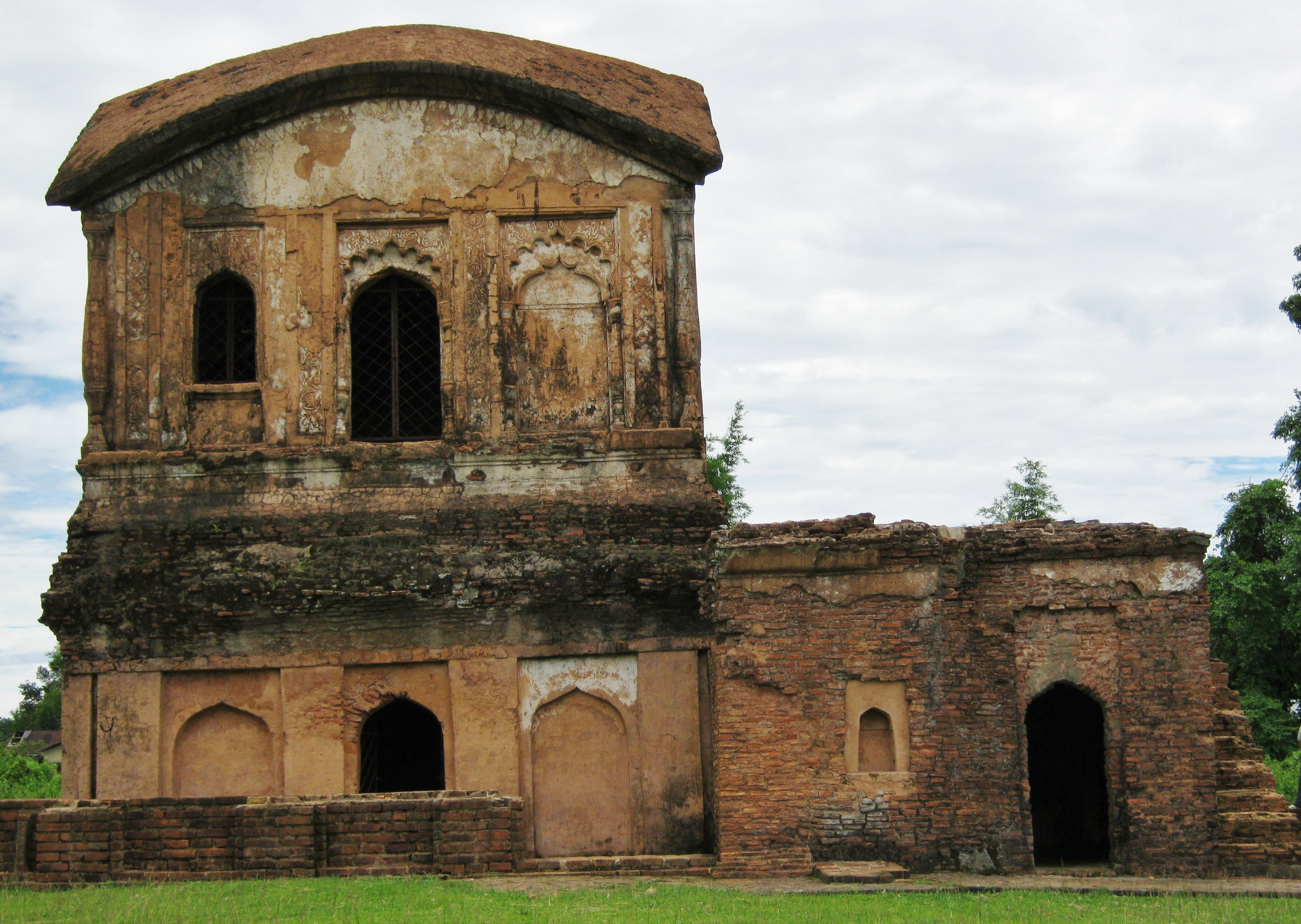
Baroduwar Dimasa Kachari Palace, Khaspur in Cachar dist

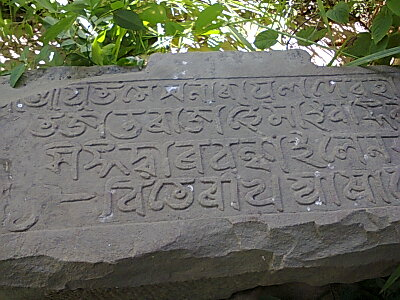
Architectural stones inscription of Dimasa King Naranarayan Hasnusa at Maibang

They live mostly in Dima Hasao District, an administrative autonomous district of the Indian state of Assam that includes the ravines of the Jatinga Valley and Dhansiri Valley, Diphu City and Howraghat region of Karbi Anglong district (East), West Karbi Anglong, Kampur region of Nagaon district, Hojai district, Cachar district, Hailakandi district, Karimganj district of Assam and Dimapur district of Nagaland and parts in Jiribam district of Manipur respectively.

== Religion ==
The Dimasa still follow their ancient animistic/shamanic faith. A syncretism of the traditional faith and Hinduism can be seen in Dimasas inhabiting Cachar.

Kailash Kumar Chhetri (Ecological Significance of the Traditional Beliefs and Practices of Dimasa Tribe, 2001) has also written while mentioning the Dimasa life system. Dimasa people have their unique social system. This social system has its own culture, tradition, and religious beliefs and practices, which are related to the land and nature of their residence. Land and nature are the source of their economy, culture, history, and Dharmic heritage.

Regarding the Dimasa belief, on the one hand, Sidney Endley (The Kacharies, 1911:33), declaring it animistic, has written that, as a rule, neither idols nor worship is found in a typical Dimasa village, but in the mind and imagination of the Dimasa the earth, air, and sky alike are inhabited by a large number of invisible spiritual beings, commonly known as Madai.

On the other hand, Humi Thousen (2019) has cited various references of Dipali Danda (Among the Dimasas of Assam, 1988) and S.K. Barpujari (History of the Dimasas from the Earliest times to 1896, 1997), Using it, it is written that six gods, who are considered as the ancestral deities of the Dimasas, have authority over the entire Dimasa land. Thus came the concept of 'Area God' among the Dimasas. As the entire Dimasa land is under their control, hence they have unstructured mythological shrines in different areas of the traditional Dimasa area. It is believed that the gods and goddesses living in a particular sacred area protect the people there and control their destiny. These unstructured shrines are called Daikho, whose number is widely believed to be twelve. As an actual empirical fact in the Dimasas, the concept of Madai as the supreme God and Daikho as the house of that God is found. The meaning of Daikho is made up of two words, Madai or Dai and Kho, which is considered the house of God. Hence, it is clear that Dimasa Kachari also gives an important place in their Dharmic structure to the twelve Daikhos present in their entire region along with various abstract states. Dimasa Life: Dharmic Beliefs, Systems

== Language ==
The Dimasa language is a Sino-Tibetan language spoken by the Dimasa people in Assam and Nagaland, India. It belongs to the Boro-Garo group of Kachari-Kachin-Konyak(SAL languages) sub-branch and is closely related to languages like Boro, Kokborok, and Garo. Dimasa is agglutinative, forming words through processes such as prefixation, suffixation, compounding, reduplication, and onomatopoeia. It has a rich phonological system with six vowels and sixteen consonants and uses both Latin and Eastern Nagari scripts for writing. As of the 2011 census, there are approximately 137,184 native speakers of Dimasa, though the language is considered vulnerable due to limited use outside the home environment.

== Culture ==
=== Society ===
The traditional village headman, who is at the top of the village administration, is a Khunang. He has both executive and judiciary powers. He is assisted by another official called the Dillik (Assistant Headman). Next to him is Daulathu who occupies the third place. Next to the Daulathu is the Haphaisgao, who holds office for two years. Other village officials include Phrai, Montri, Hangsbukhu, and Jalairao.

=== Clans ===
The Dimasas form a "sealed" society—every member drawing his or her patriarchal lineage from one of the forty two male clans (sengphong—"holder of the sword") and the matriarchal lineage from one of the forty-two female clans (jalik or julu). These clans are distributed among twelve territorial "sacred groves" called daikhos.

Dimasa men are divided into 40 patriarchal clans. These are:

- Ardaosa
- Mitherpangsa
- Diphusa
- Hagjersa
- Thaosensa
- Phonglosa
- Sengyungsa
- Raijungsa
- Bader-Baiga
- Daulagajao
- Daolagupu
- Hojaisa
- Kemprai
- Jidungsa
- Baindosa (Nunisa)
- Khersa
- Hasnu
- Haflongbar
- Bodosa/Bathari
- Hapila
- Diruwasa
- Naidingsa
- Daodunglangtha
- Karigapsa
- Joraisa
- Hasamsa
- Nabensa
- Dibragede
- Langthasa
- Girisa
- Porbosa
- Maibangsa
- Johorisa
- Sorongpang
- Gorlosa
- Hakmaosa
- Maramsa
- Jarambusa
- Labtaisa
- Laobangdisa

=== Festivals ===
Since 1994 as per the decision of Dimasa community of Dima Hasao, the Autonomous Council of Dima Hasao had officially declared 27 January as Busu Dima festival day.

=== Dress and ornaments ===
==== Ornaments ====
The male Dimasa use only two types of ornaments namely Yaocher and Kharik.

Females use:

- Phowal: necklace made of expensive Coral and Real silver metal beads; also worn by males
- Jongsama: necklace made of micro-beads of any colour, with coral and silver beads in between.
- Rangbarsha: necklace made of coins.
- Chandrawal: necklace made of three silver chains with flower shapes.
- Rmailik: necklace made of micro-beads; the colour pattern is same with the Rijamphain beren or Rmai (chest wrapper)
- Likjao: necklace made of Red micro beads
- Likshim: necklace made of black micro beads
- Khadu: heavy silver bangle
- Khamaothai: silver or gold earring
- Yaoshidam: finger ring

=== Dances ===
The dance forms of the Dimasa Kachari are complex in character.

Any Dimasa dance is called Baidima (Bai-means dance, Dima-means Dimasa).

== Notable people ==
- Nandita Garlosa, politician

== See also ==
- Dimaraji
