= Siju Wildlife Sanctuary =

Wildlife sanctuary in Meghalaya, India

- Siju Bird Sanctuary
- IUCN category IV (habitat/species management area)
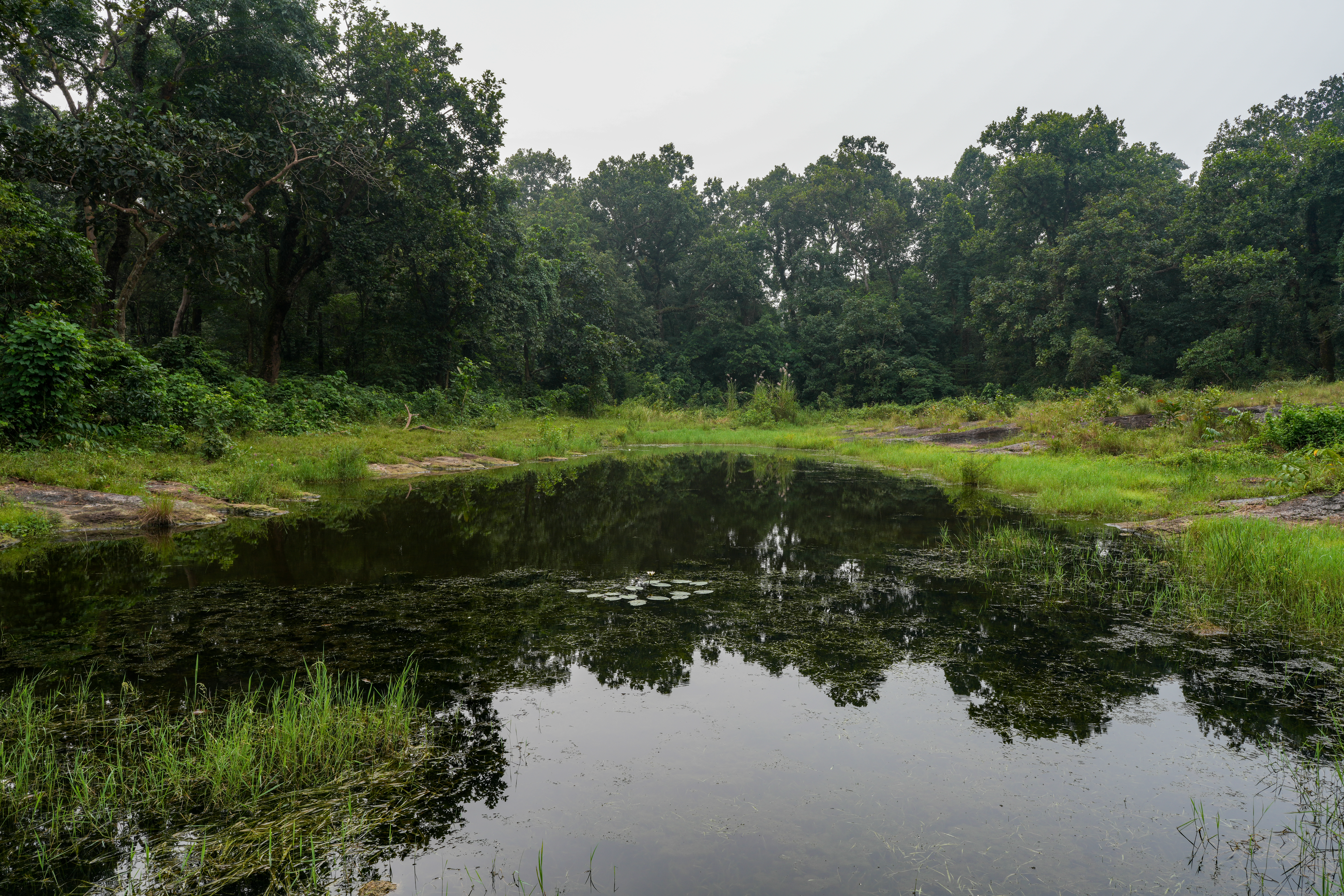
- Artificial pond in the middle of the sanctuary

- Location within Meghalaya Location within India
- Interactive map of Siju Wildlife Sanctuary
- Coordinates: 25°20′16″N 90°41′11″E
- Area: 5.18 km^{2} (2.00 sq mi)
- Established: 1979
- Website: Forest & Environment Department, Government of Meghalaya

Siju Wildlife Sanctuary is situated in the South Garo Hills district of Meghalaya, India. It is the first and oldest wildlife sanctuary in Meghalaya. It is also known as Siju Bird Sanctuary as it is a home for many rare and protected birds such as the Grey Hornbill. Other migratory birds such as Siberian ducks and spoonbills are also sighted here.

== History ==
The area was first declared a Reserve Forest by the Lieutenant-Governor of East Bengal and Assam in 1906. In 1979, the area was converted to the first wildlife sanctuary in Meghalaya. The name is derived from the nearby village Siju, which is largely populated by the Attong subtribe of the Garo people.

By the 1970s biogeographical studies created awareness that isolated reserves or islands of wilderness were insufficient to support certain species such as elephants. Consequently, there was a move to setup elephant corridors in various parts of India connecting nearby reserves. Elephant habitats in the Garo Hills are separated by the Simsang river with limestone cliffs along the banks. Elephants can cross the river in only four places where there are sandy beaches. In the 1990s, the Wildlife Trust of India worked with the Meghalaya Forest Department and local communities to create and preserve the Siju-Rewak elephant corridor. This corridor along the south border of the Siju Wildlife Sanctuary is 3.5 km (2.2 mi) long and 2 km (1.2 mi) km wide. At that time, it connected 650 elephants in the Balpakaram National Park with 200 elephants in the Rewak Reserve Forest across the Simsang.

== Geography ==
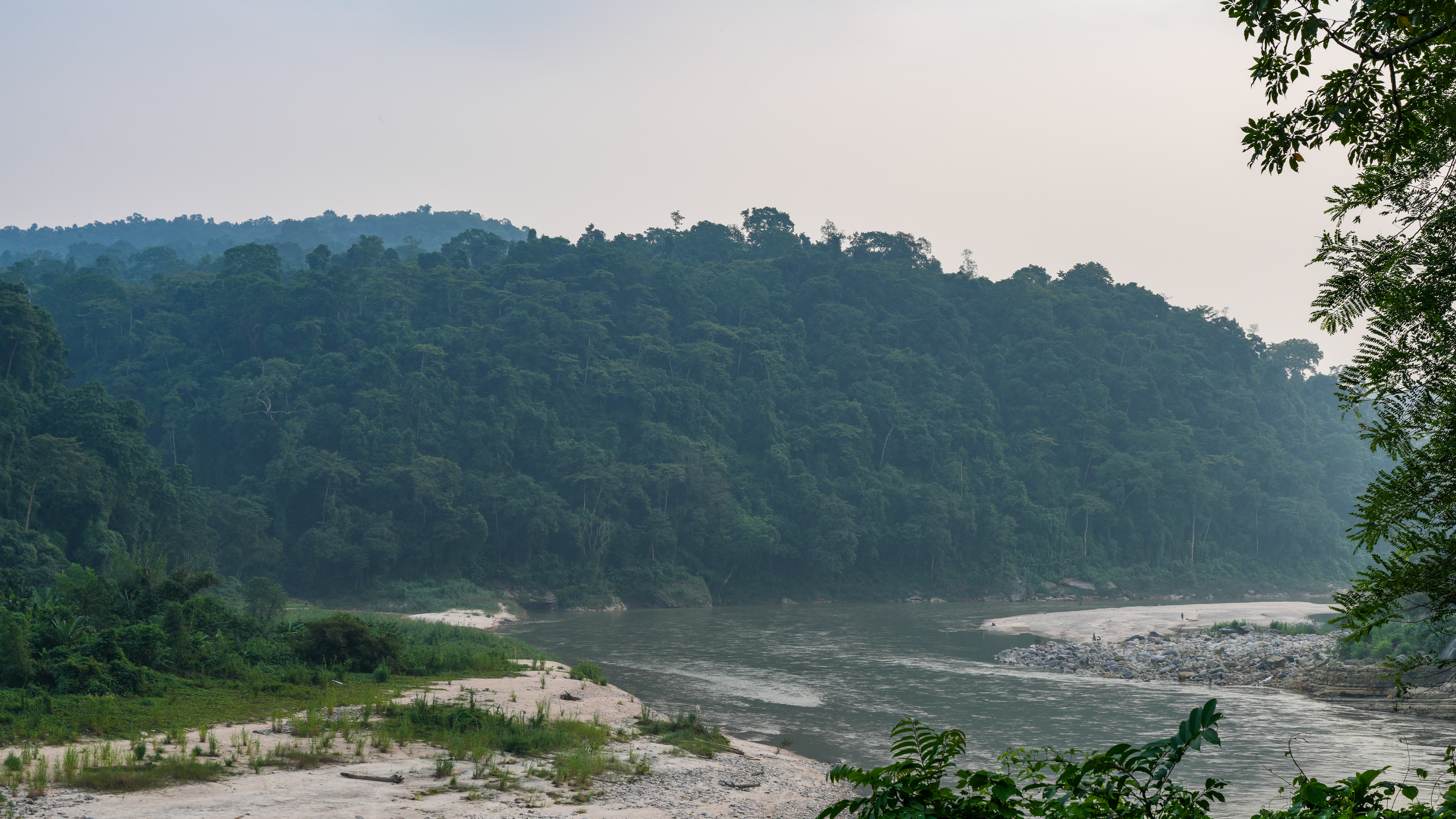
Dense forested slope of the sanctuary on the left bank of the Simsang

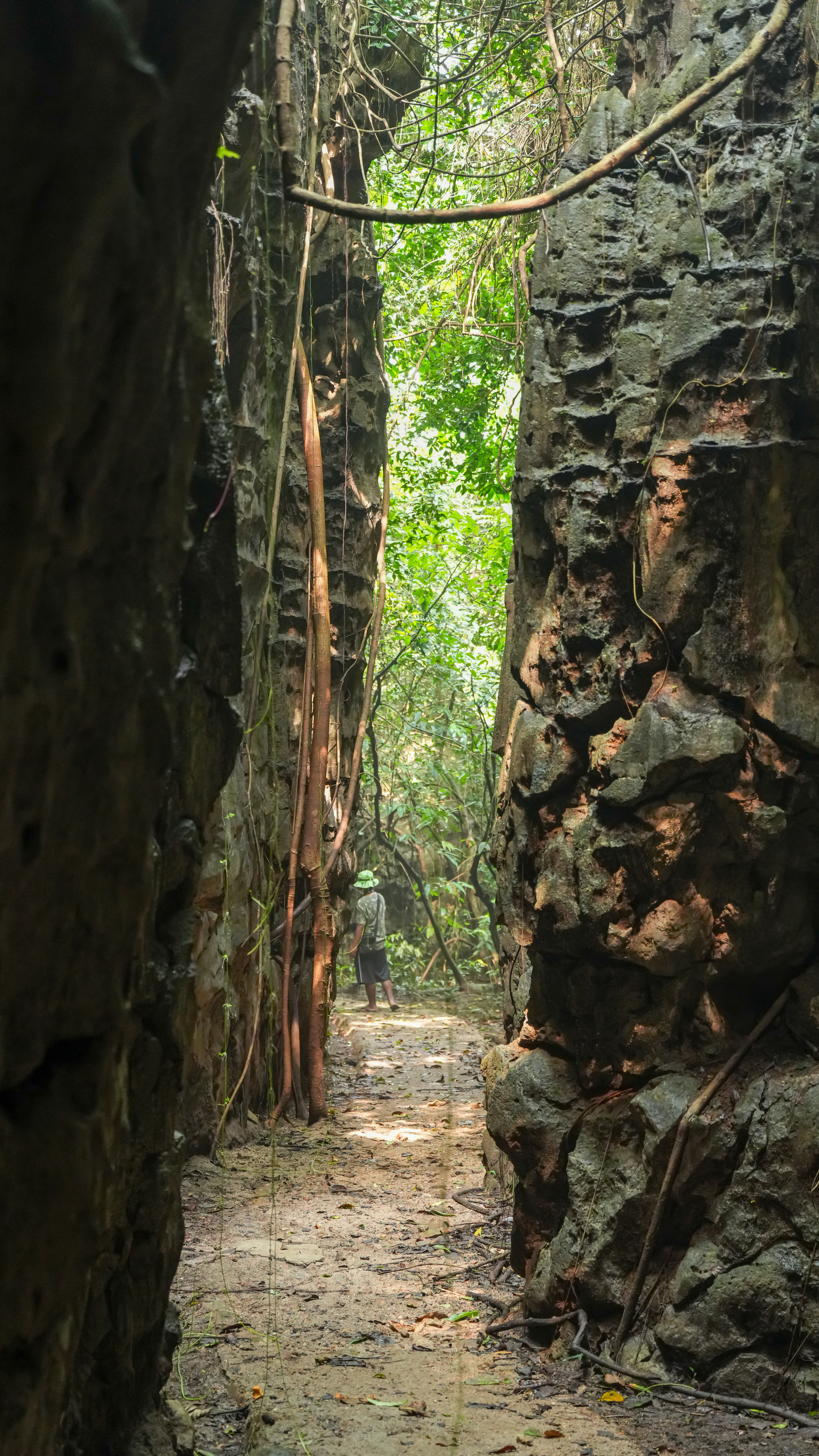
Path through limestone formation, Goera Ronggat

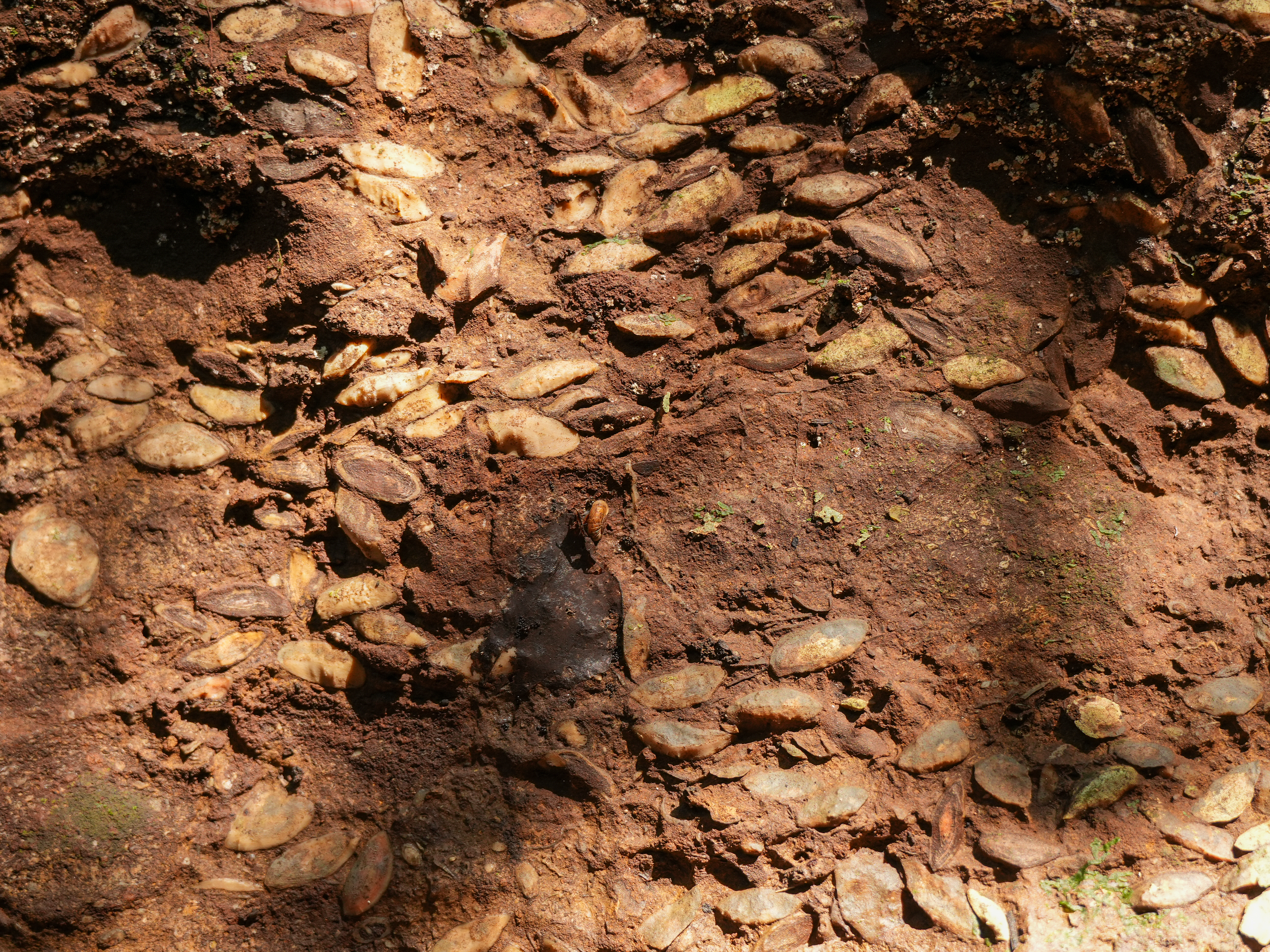
Marine fossils in the Goera Ronggat limestone strata

=== Location ===
Situated in the South Garo Hills, Siju Wildlife Sanctuary is the oldest Wildlife Sanctuary in the state of Meghalaya. It is located 45 km (28 mi) from Baghmara, 160 km (99 mi) from Tura and about 475 km (295 mi) from Shillong. The sanctuary covers an area of 5.18 km^{2} (2.00 sq mi). On the west, it is bordered by the Simsang river. On the east, it abuts the Balpakram National Park. The southern border is shared with the Balpakram-Baghmara and Siju-Rewak elephant corridors.

Access to the core sanctuary is via a path that starts from the bank of the Simsang River a short distance downstream of the Siju Hanging Bridge. The path climbs steeply up steps constructed in 2021-22 by the Wildlife Department. After climbing about 90 m (300 ft) the path reaches narrow clefts in the Goera Ronggat limestone formation. The climb of the next 100 m (330 ft) is more gradual. The last section is level until an artificial pond in the centre of the sanctuary, about 2.5 km (1.6 mi) from the river.

==== Gallery ====
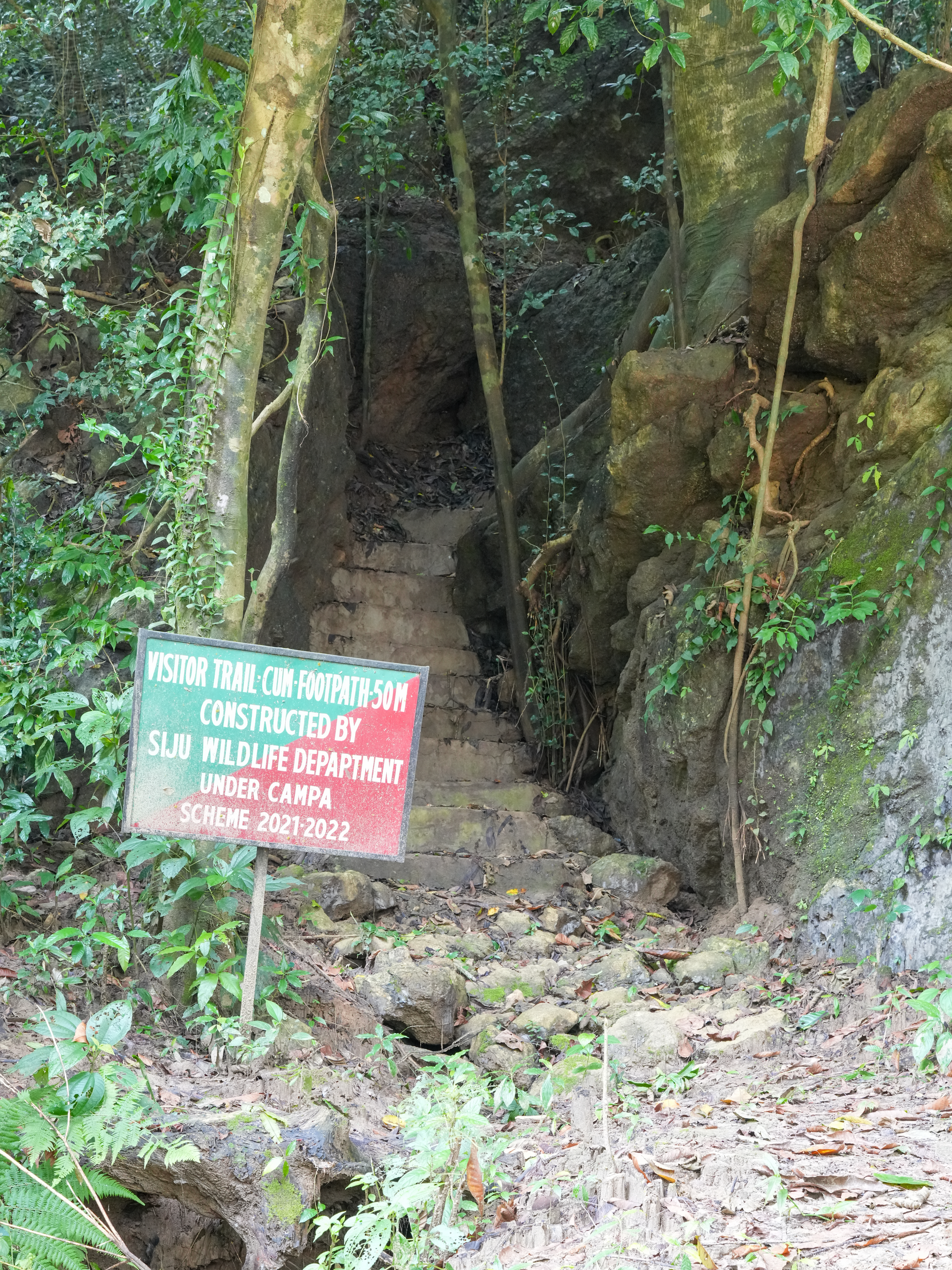
Entrance to Siju WLS from the Simsang River bank

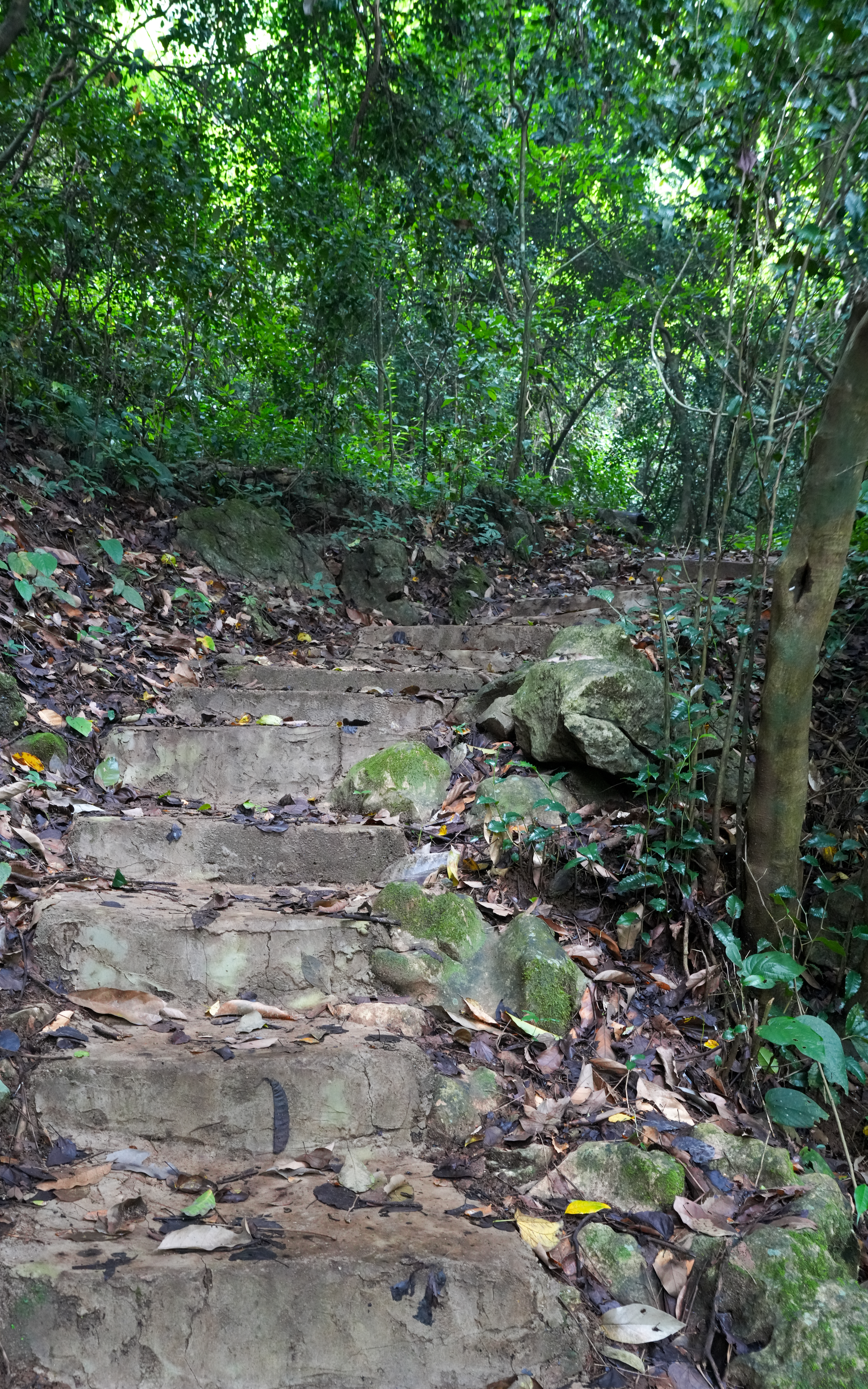
Steps leading into the core sanctuary

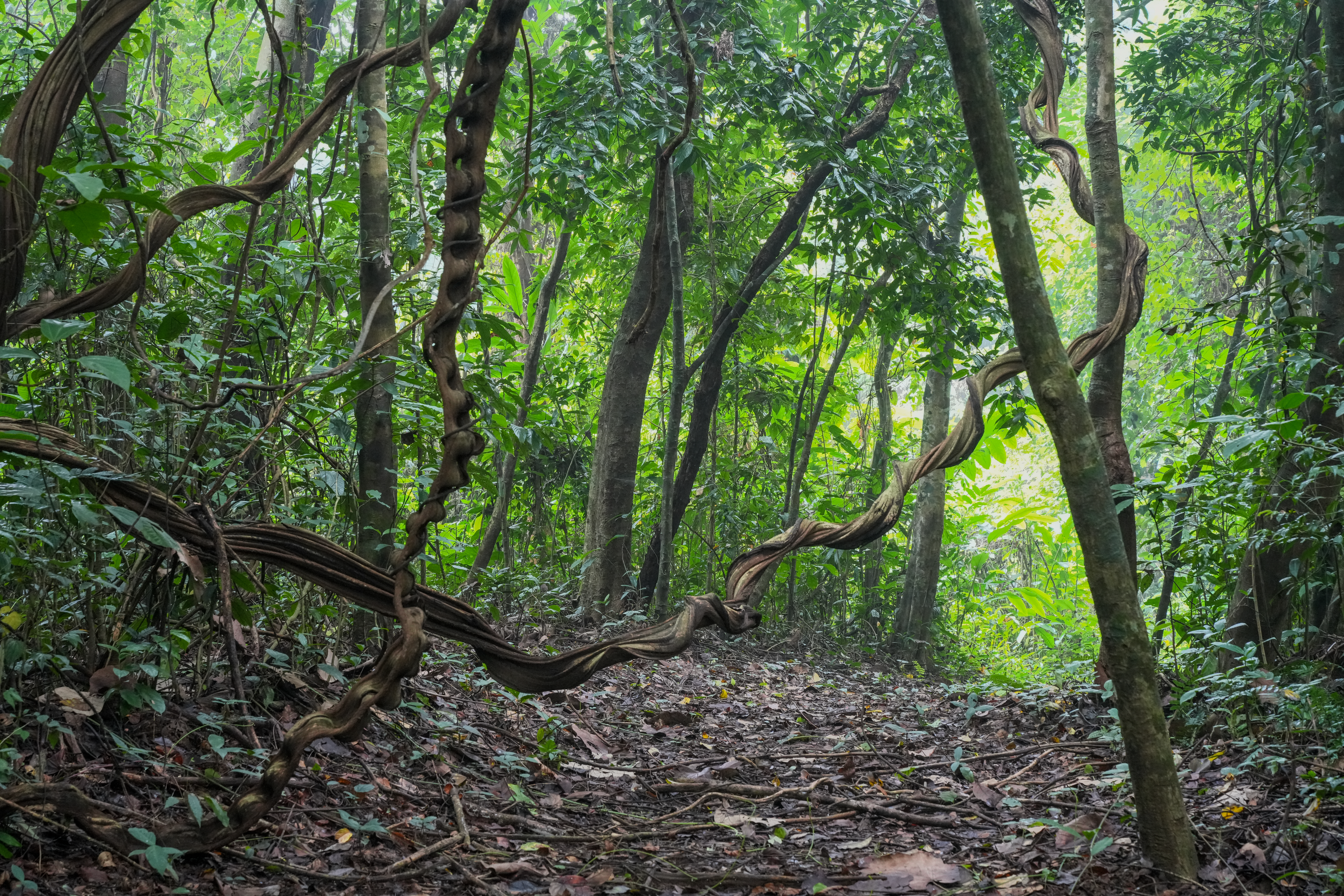
Vines across path through dense forest

=== Geology ===
The trail from the Simsang River to the core area of the Sanctuary passes through unusual limestone formations called Goera Ronggat. The formations contain marine fossil beds with fossilized amulets, shells, starfishes and other marine life forms that are millions of years old.

==== Gallery ====
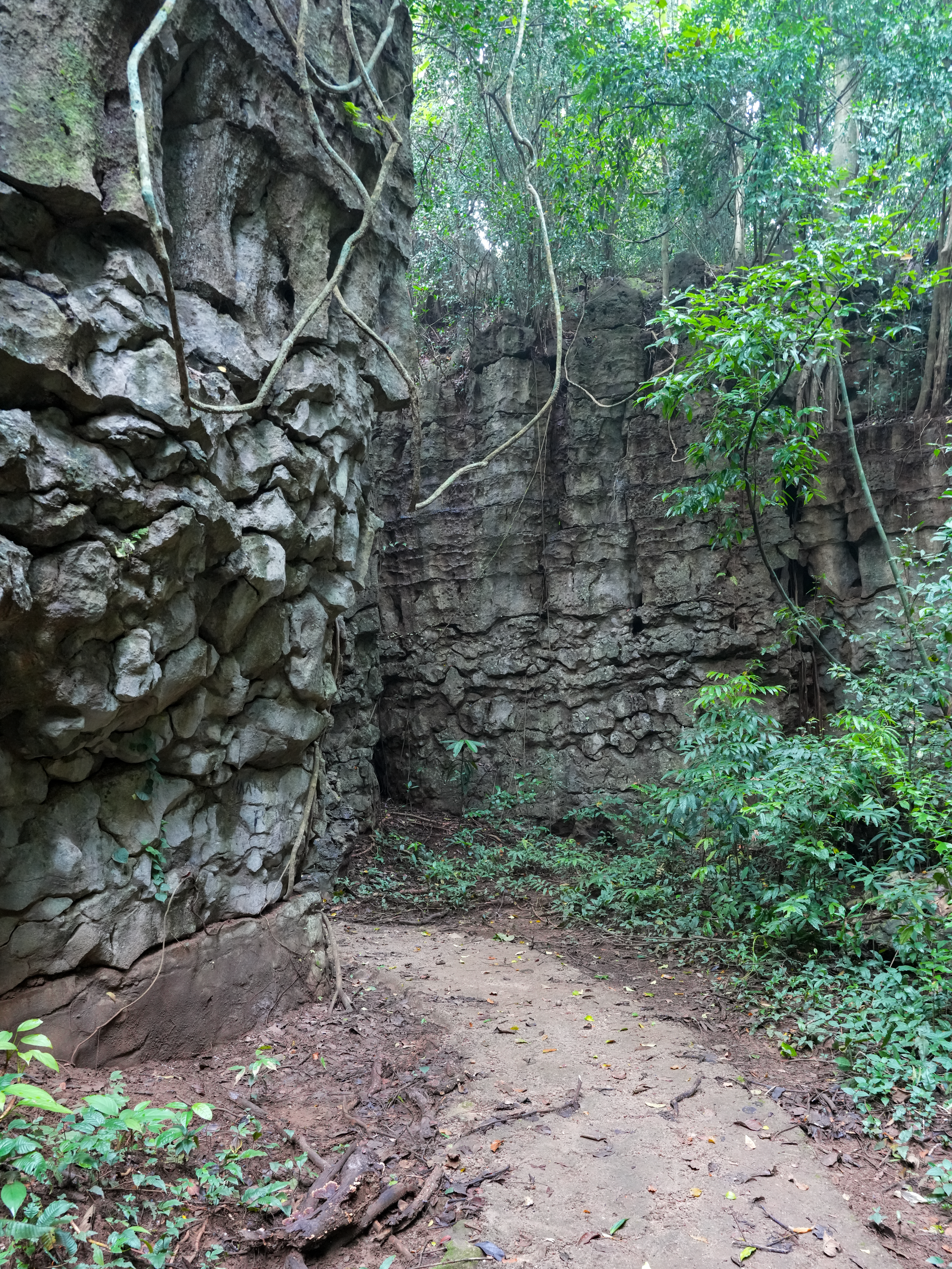
Path from Simsang river enters Goera Ronggat

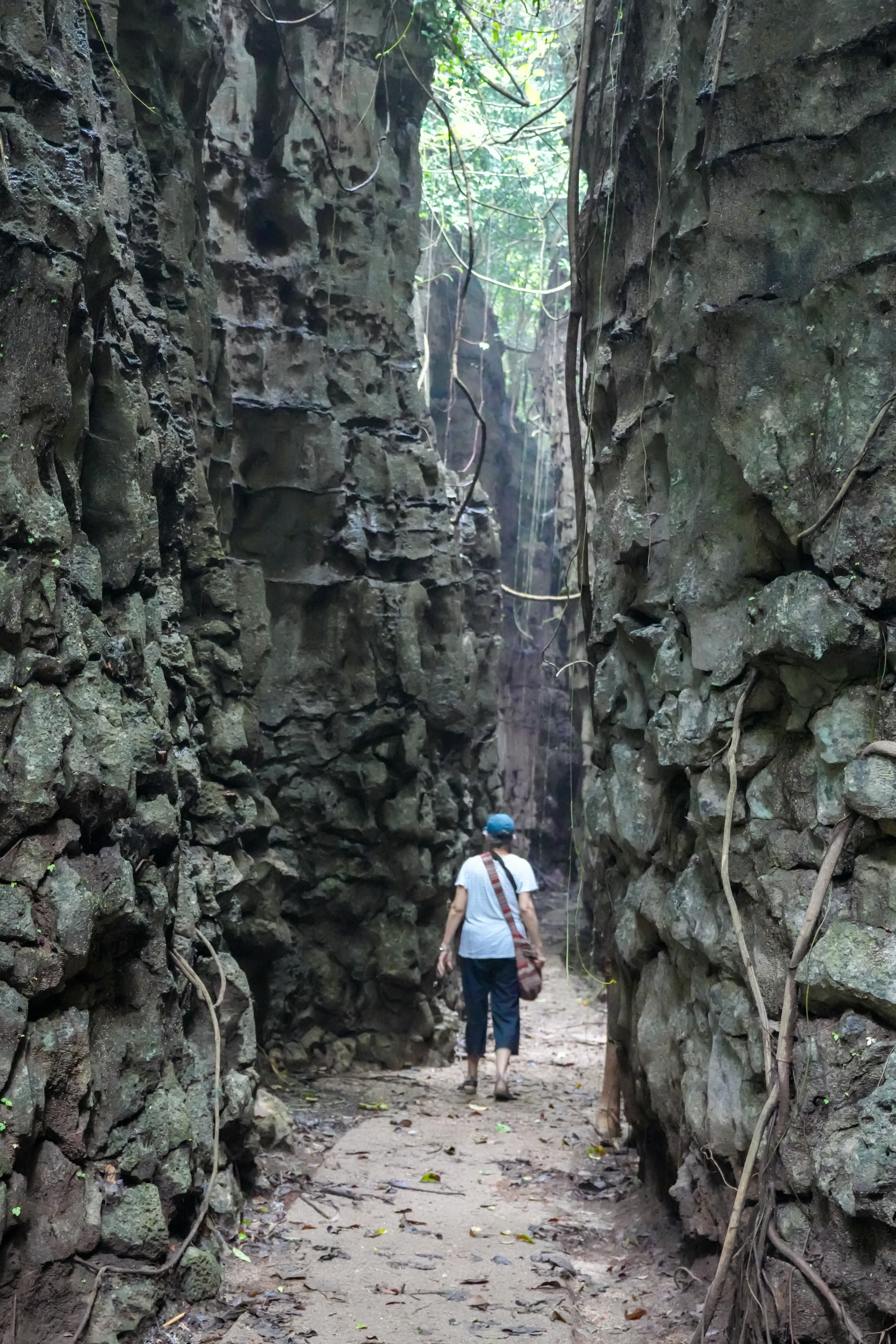
Path through Goera Ronggat

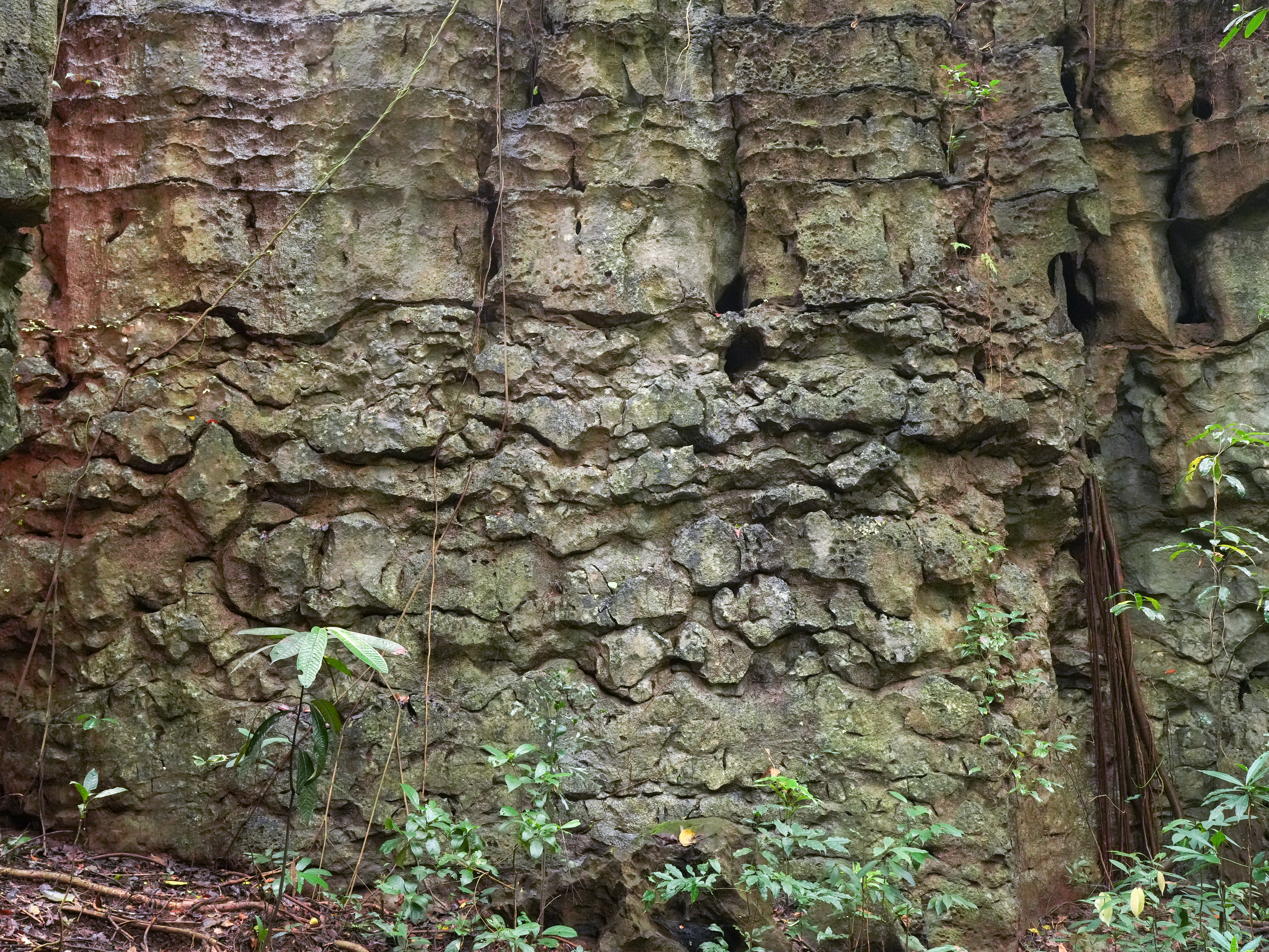
Detail of limestone formation

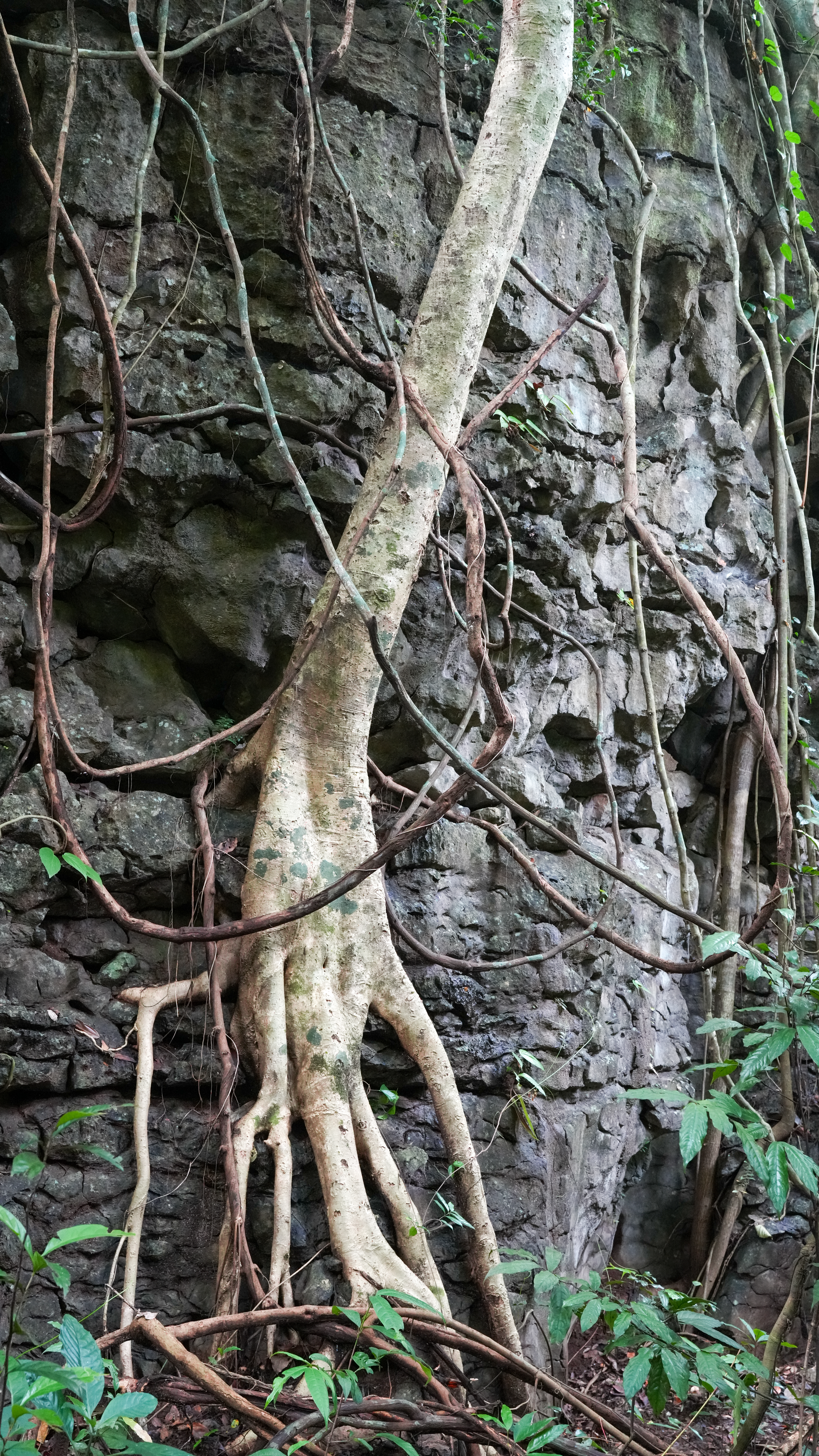
Tree growing in the limestone cliff

== Wildlife ==
Siju Wildlife Sanctuary is home to many endemic and rare flora and fauna. Many animal species such as elephants, Sambar deer, wild boars, leopards, tigers, barking deer, etc. are sighted here. Other primates such as the slow loris, Hoolock gibbon, and langurs are also found here.

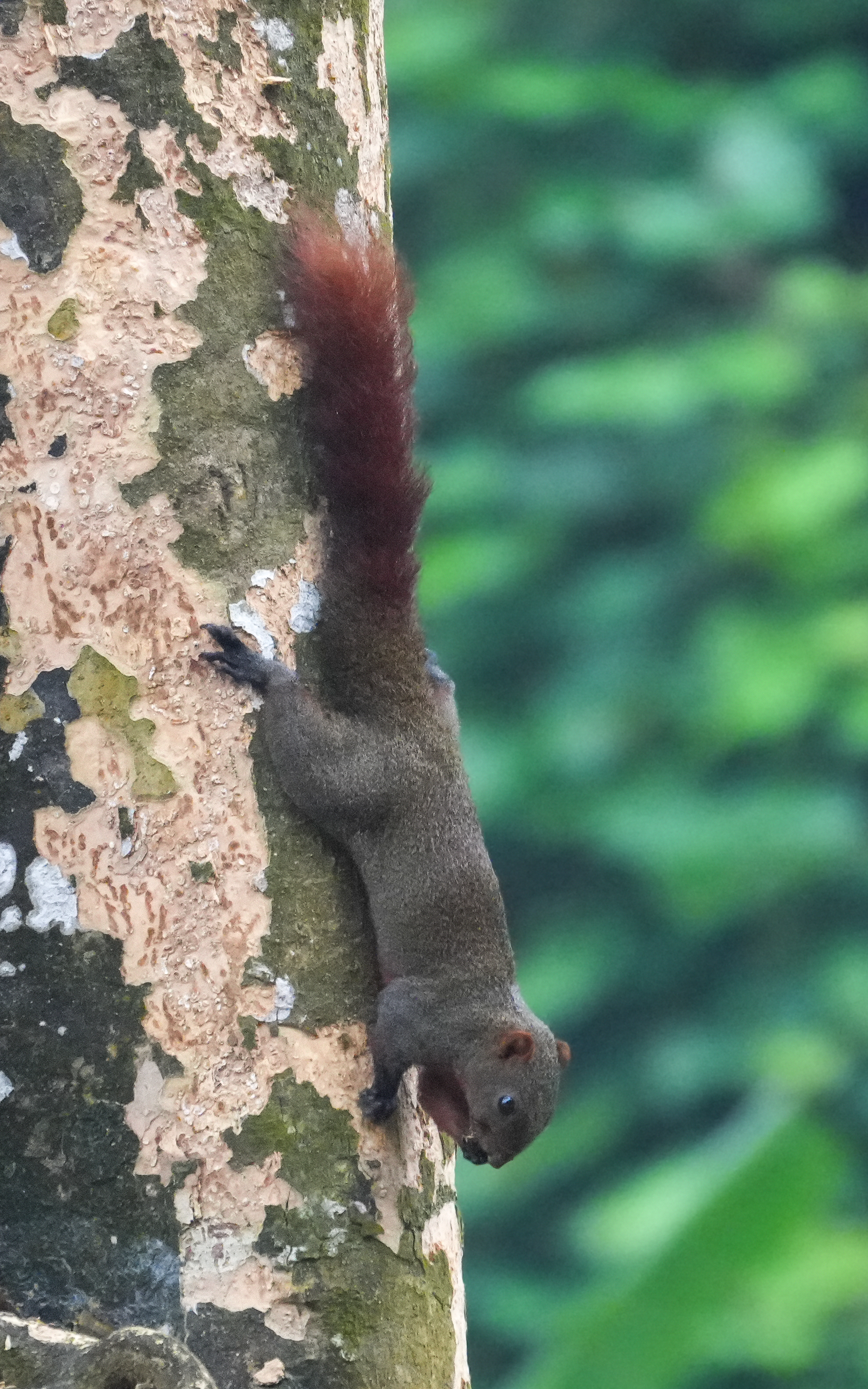
Pallas's squirrel (Callosciurus erythraeus) in Siju Wildlife Sanctuary

=== Avifauna ===
A total of 77 species of resident and migratory birds have been reported on the EBird online database by birders during the period 2011-2025. Migratory birds include Grey Hornbills, spoonbills, and Siberian ducks. Peacock-pheasant also inhabit Siju Wildlife Sanctuary.

=== Gallery ===
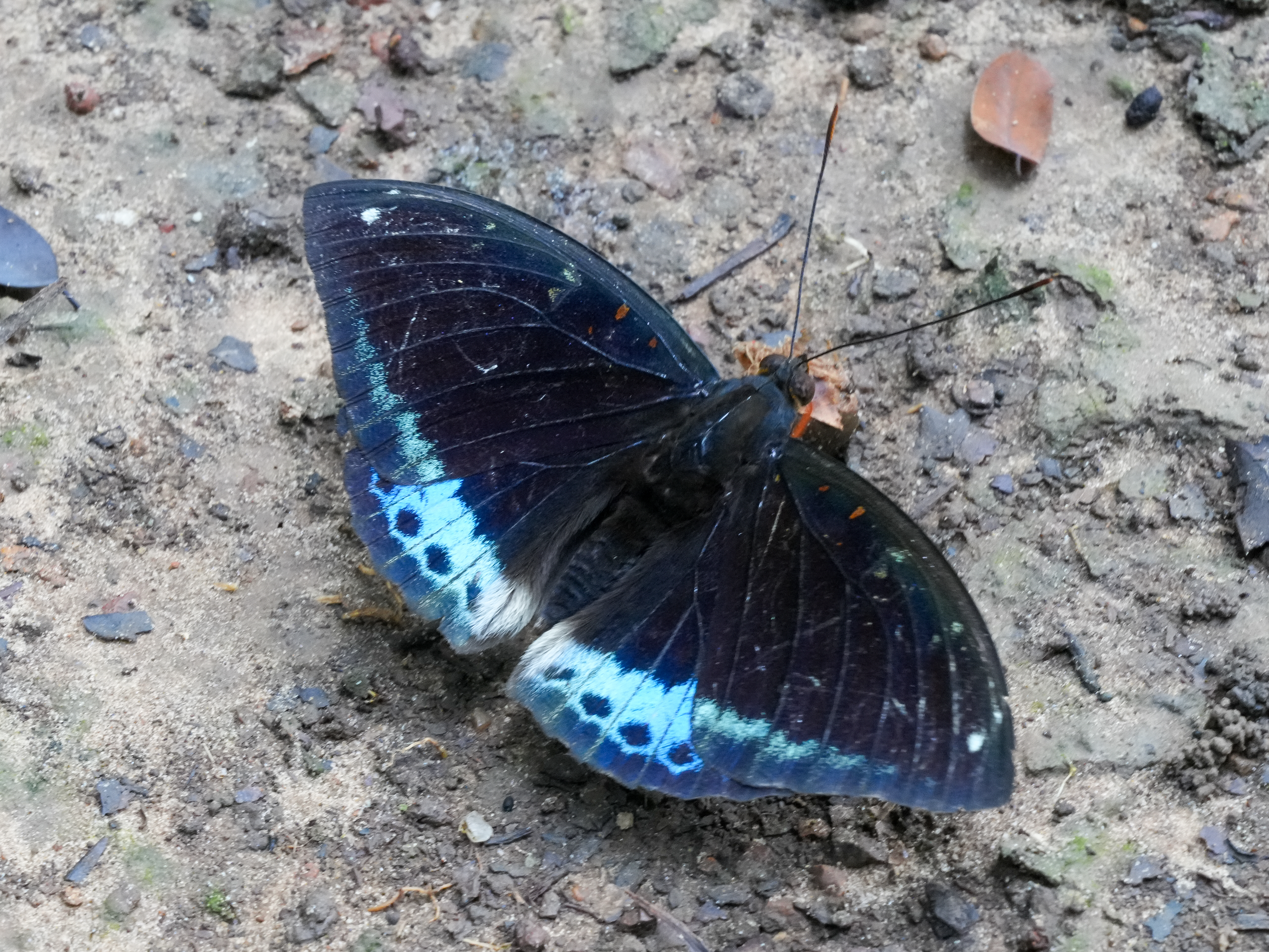
Khasi Dark Archduke male (Lexias dirtea khasiana)

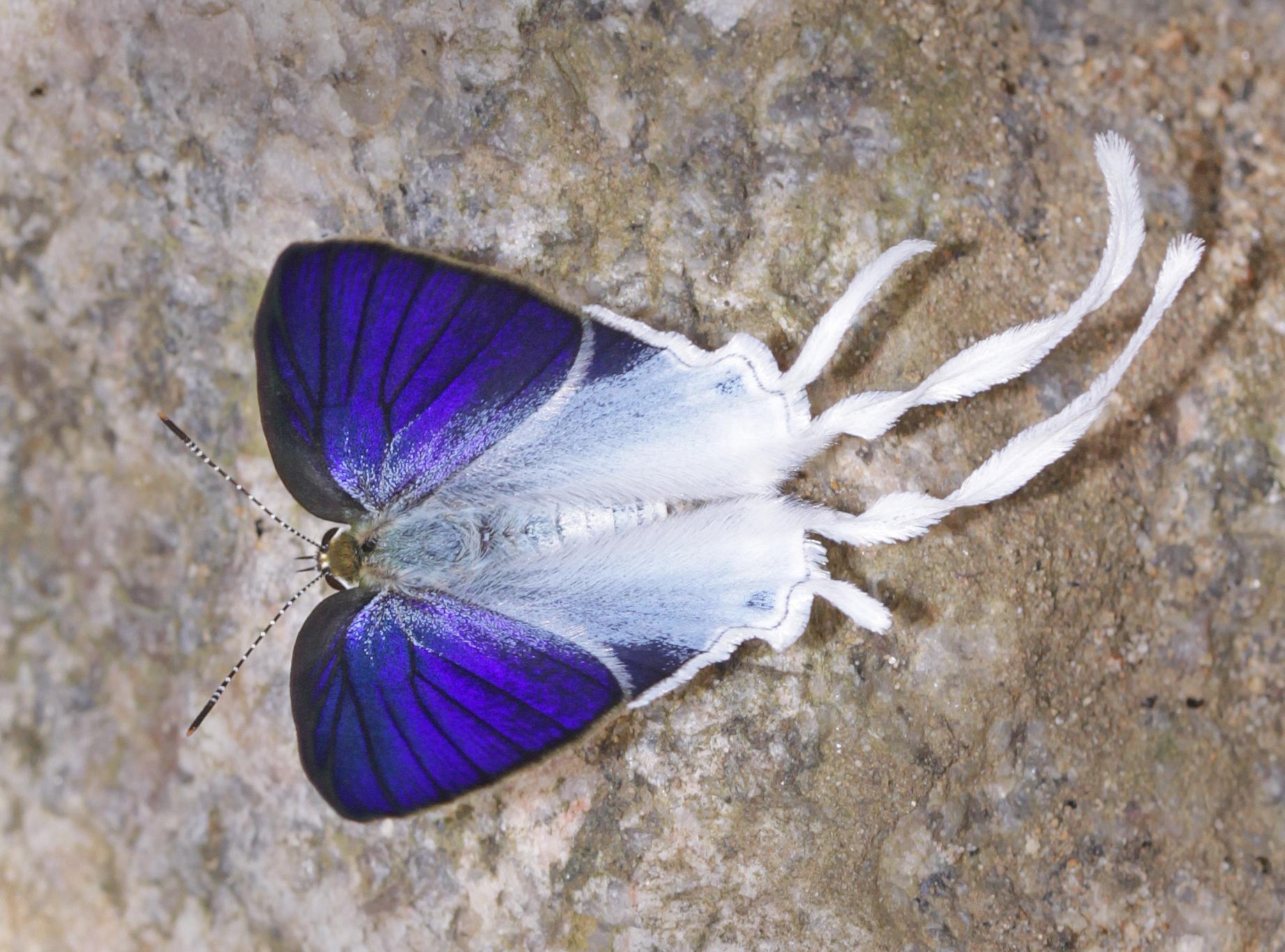
Male Fluffy Tit male (Zeltus amasa amasa)

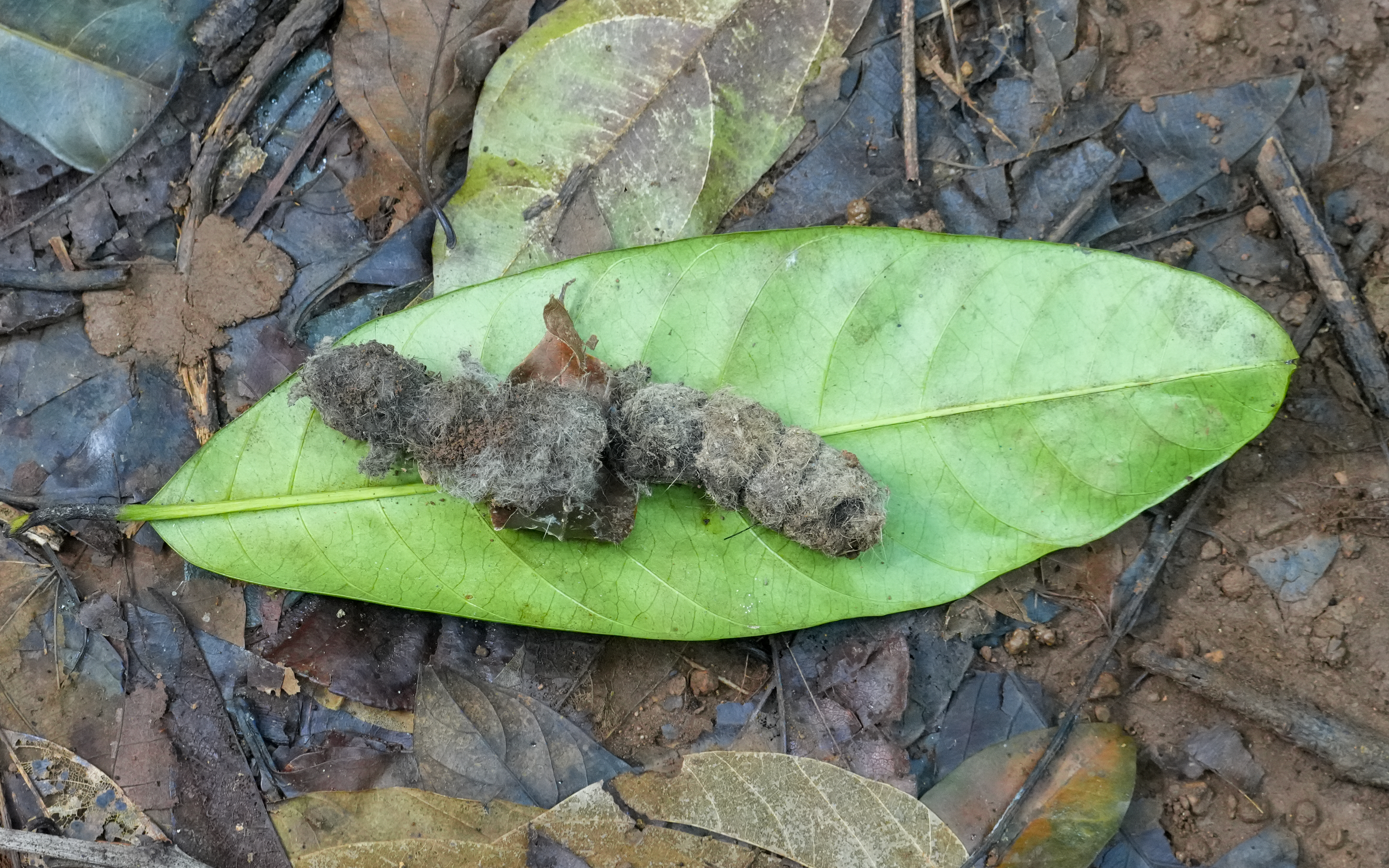
Scat of a carnivore near Goera Ronggat

== Flora ==
=== Gallery ===
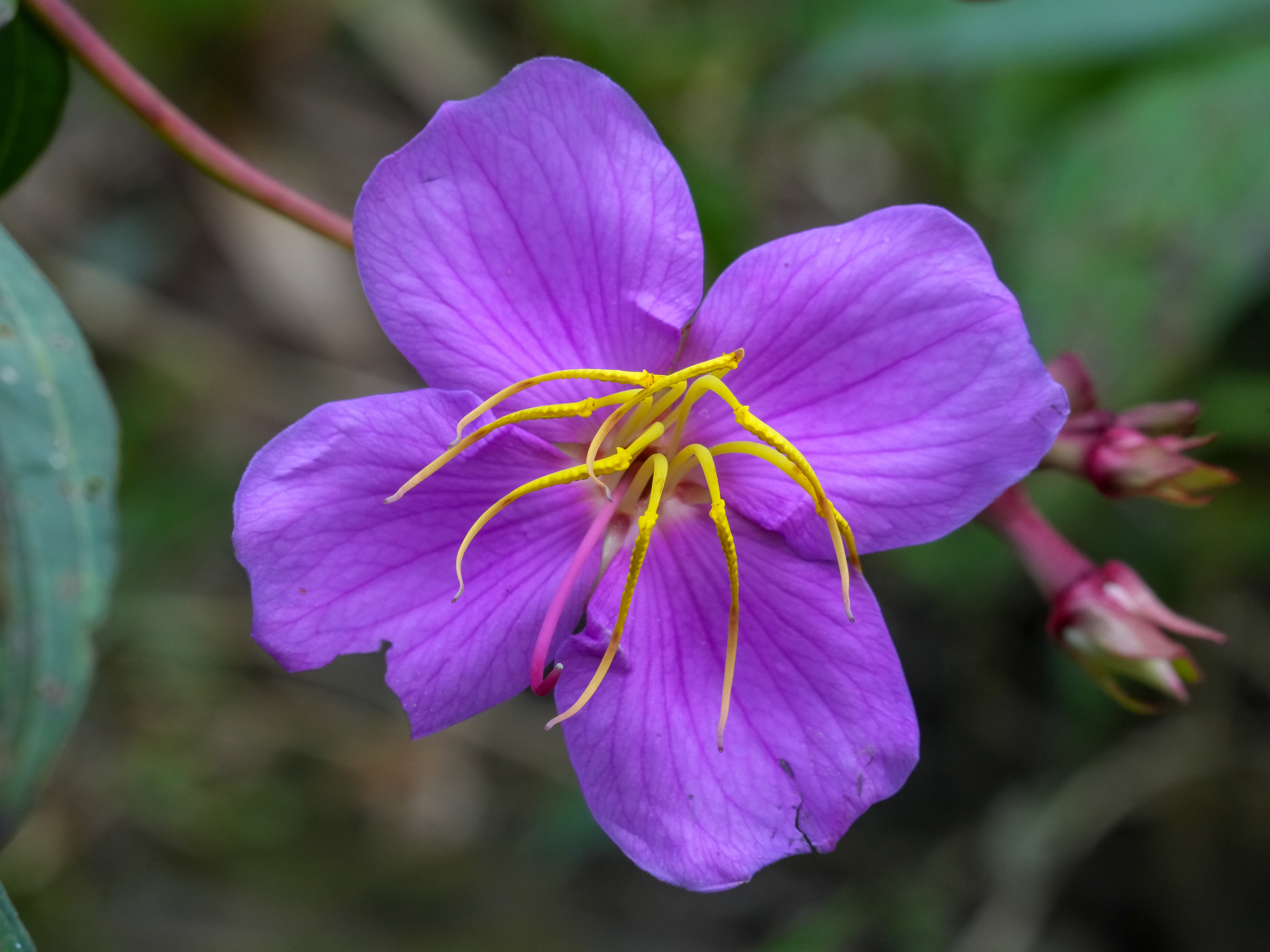
Osbeckia stellata, October 2024

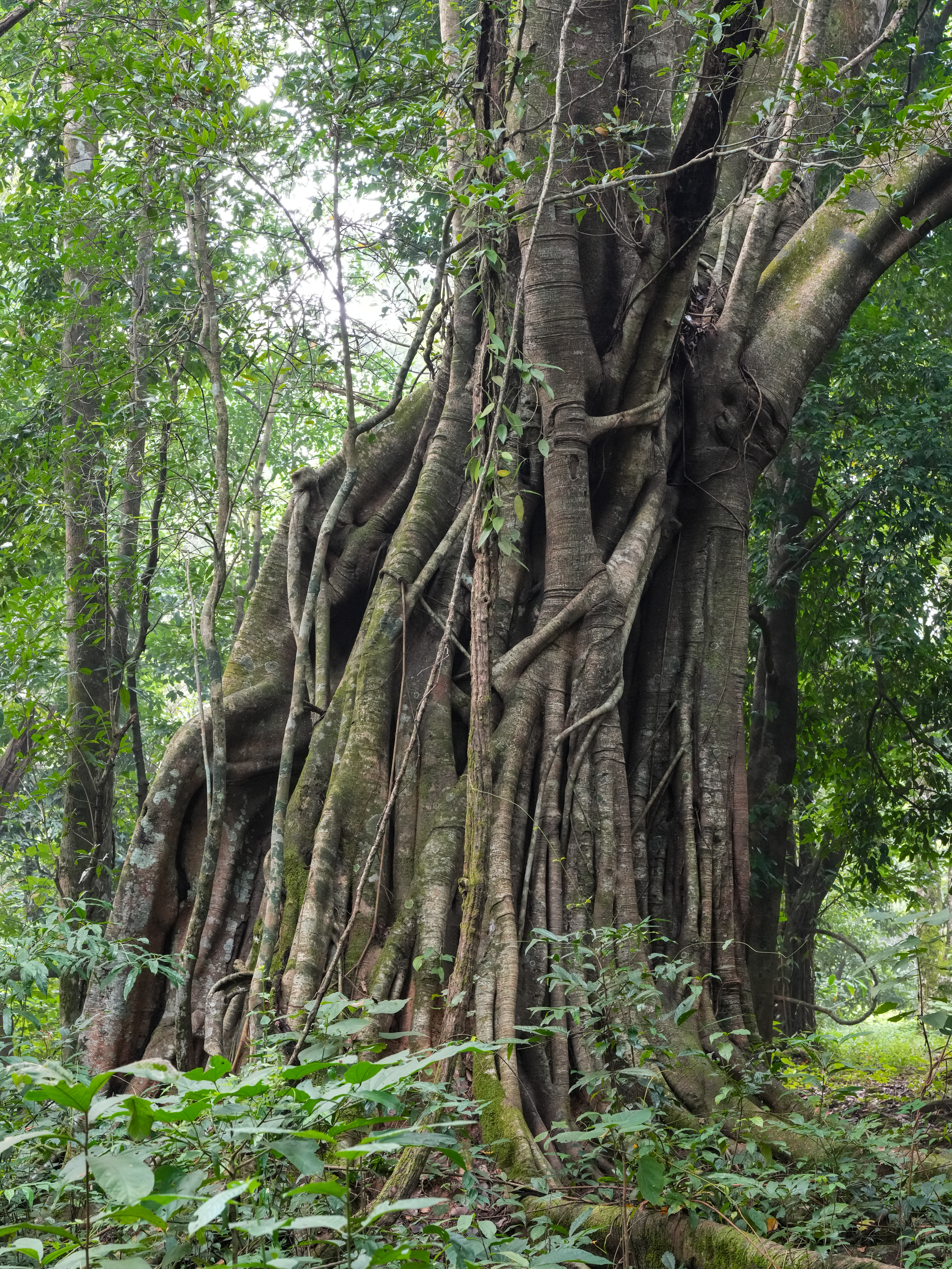
Convoluted trunk of banyan tree (Ficus religiosa)

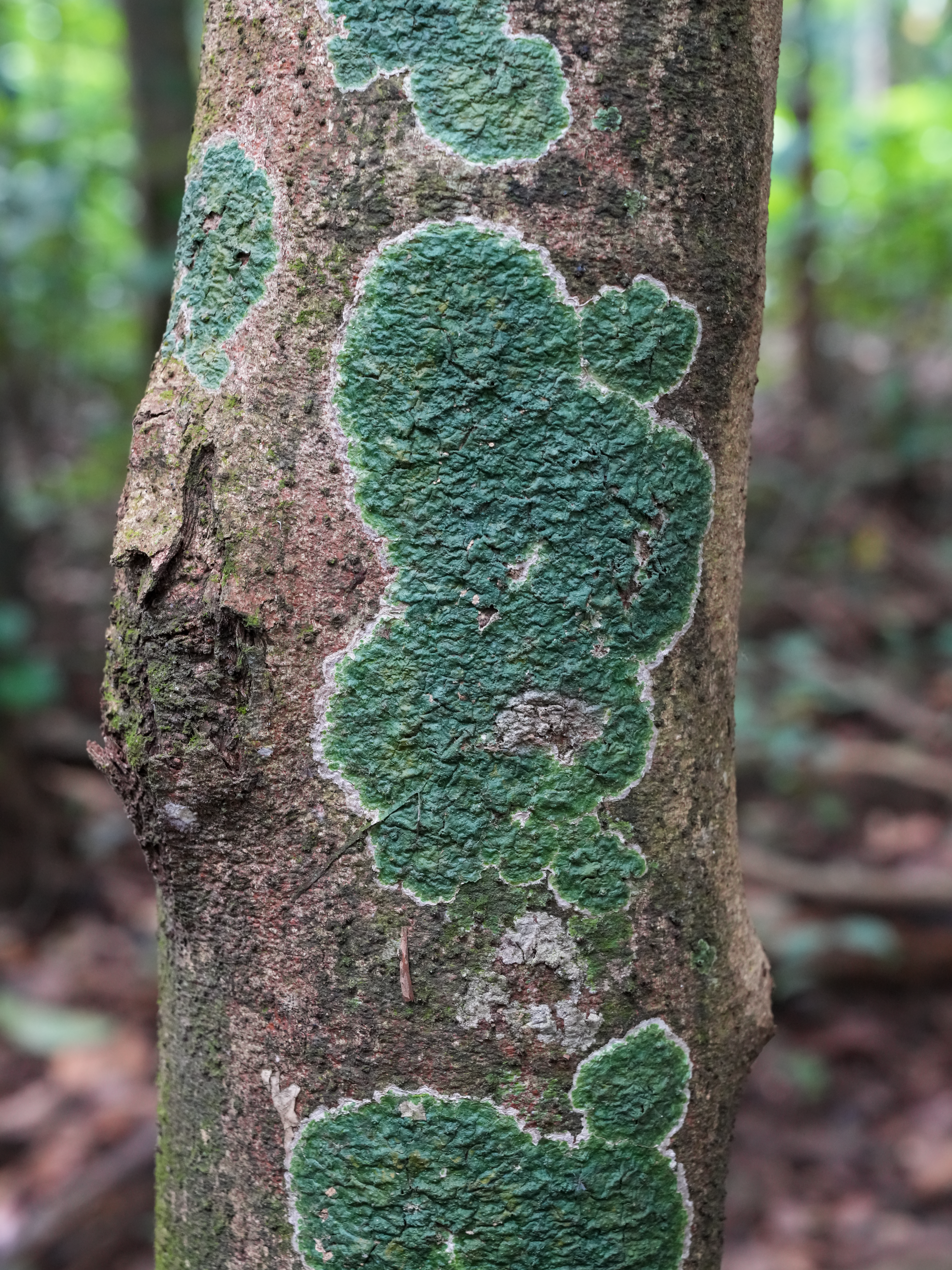
Green fungus on tree trunk, October 2024

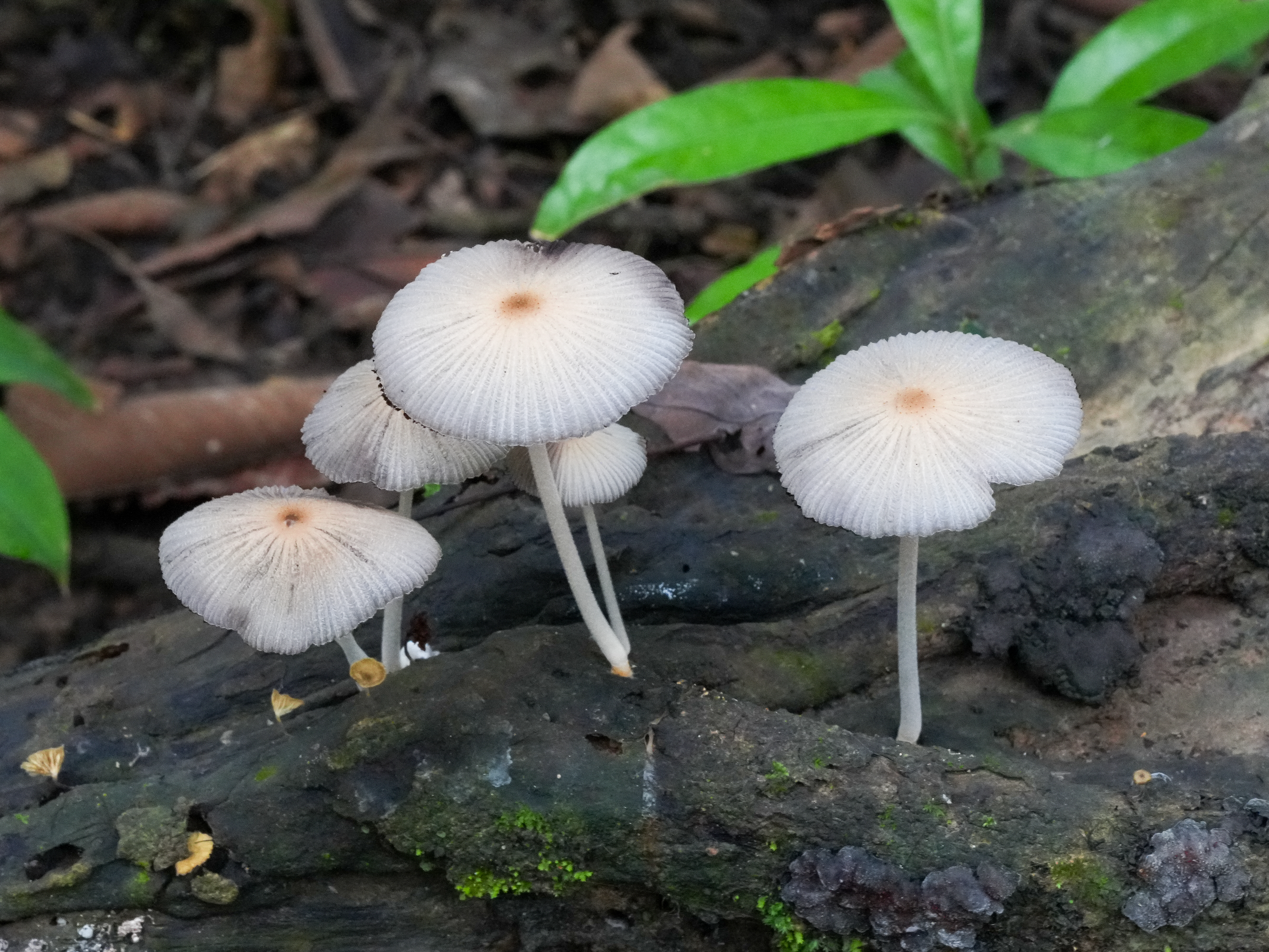
White fungi on dead log, October 2024

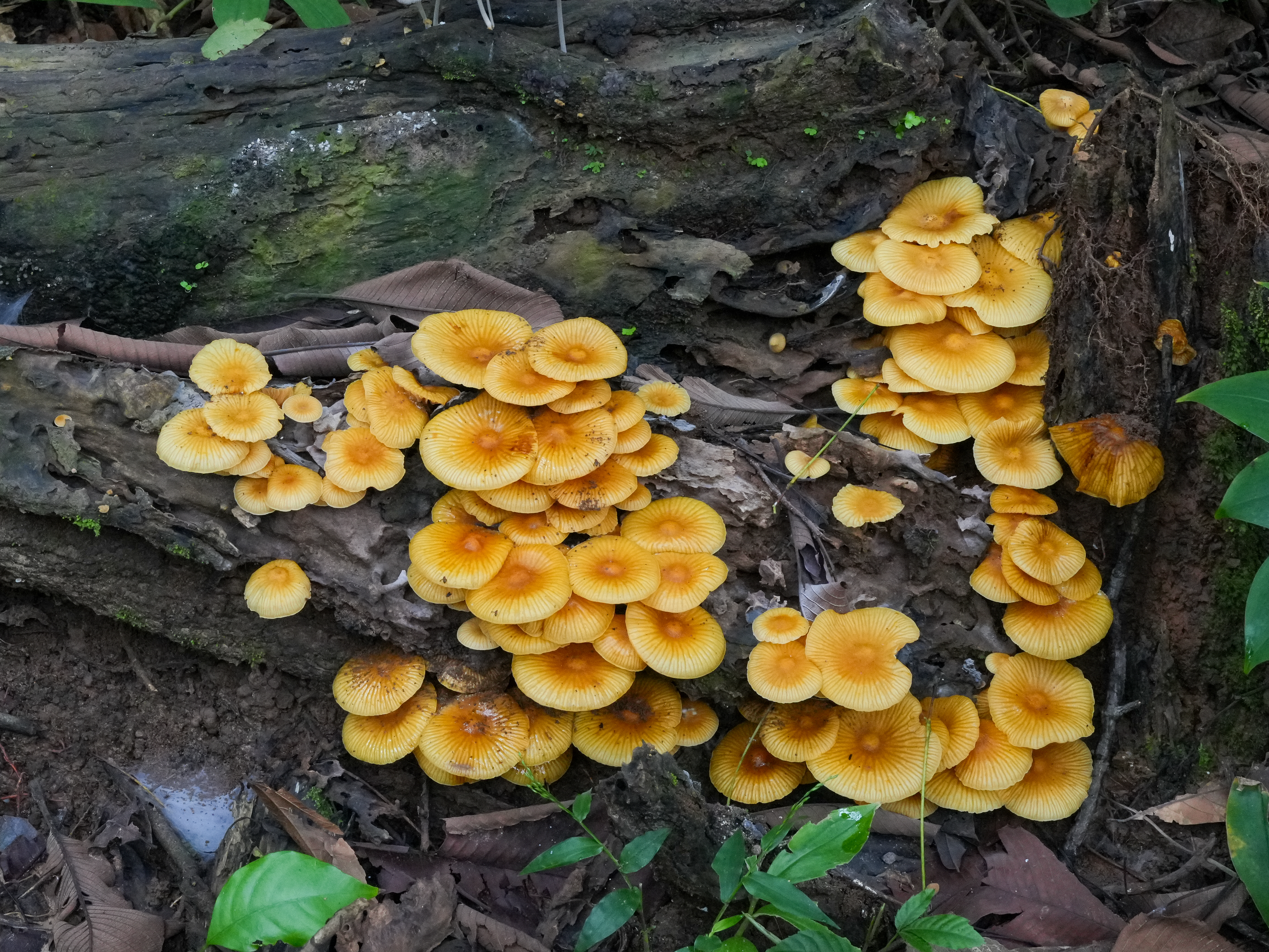
Yellow fungi on dead log, October 2024
