= Baghmara =

Baghmara may refer to:

- Baghmara, Barisal, a village in south-central Bangladesh
- Baghmara (community development block), Jharkhand, India
- Baghmara, Dhanbad, Jharkhand, India
- Baghmara, Meghalaya, India
- Bagmara Upazila, Bangladesh
