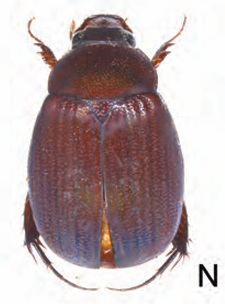

Scientific classification
- Kingdom: Animalia
- Phylum: Arthropoda
- Class: Insecta
- Order: Coleoptera
- Suborder: Polyphaga
- Infraorder: Scarabaeiformia
- Family: Scarabaeidae
- Genus: Maladera
- Species: M. balphakramensis

Binomial name
- Maladera balphakramensis Ahrens & Fabrizi, 2016

= Maladera balphakramensis =

Species of beetle

Maladera balphakramensis is a species of beetle of the family Scarabaeidae. It is found in India (Meghalaya).

== Description ==
Adults reach a length of about 7.8 mm. They have a dark reddish brown, oblong-oval body. The antennae are yellowish. The upper surface is mostly dull and nearly glabrous.

== Etymology ==
The species name refers to its occurrence in the Balphakram National Park.
