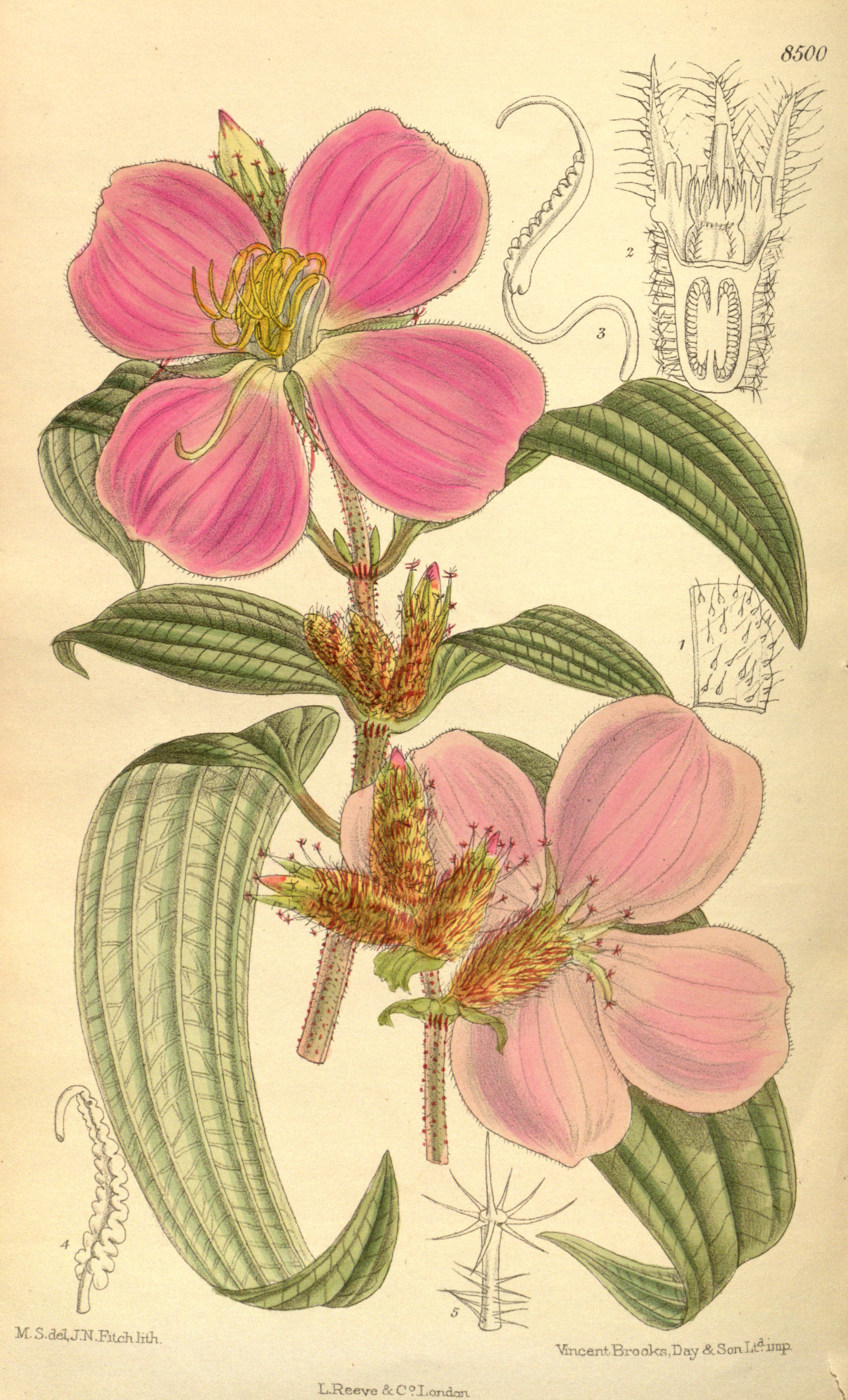

Scientific classification
- Kingdom: Plantae
- Clade: Tracheophytes
- Clade: Angiosperms
- Clade: Eudicots
- Clade: Rosids
- Order: Myrtales
- Family: Melastomataceae
- Genus: Osbeckia
- Species: O. stellata

Binomial name
- Osbeckia stellata Buchanan-Hamilton ex Kew Gawler

= Osbeckia stellata =

Species of flowering plant

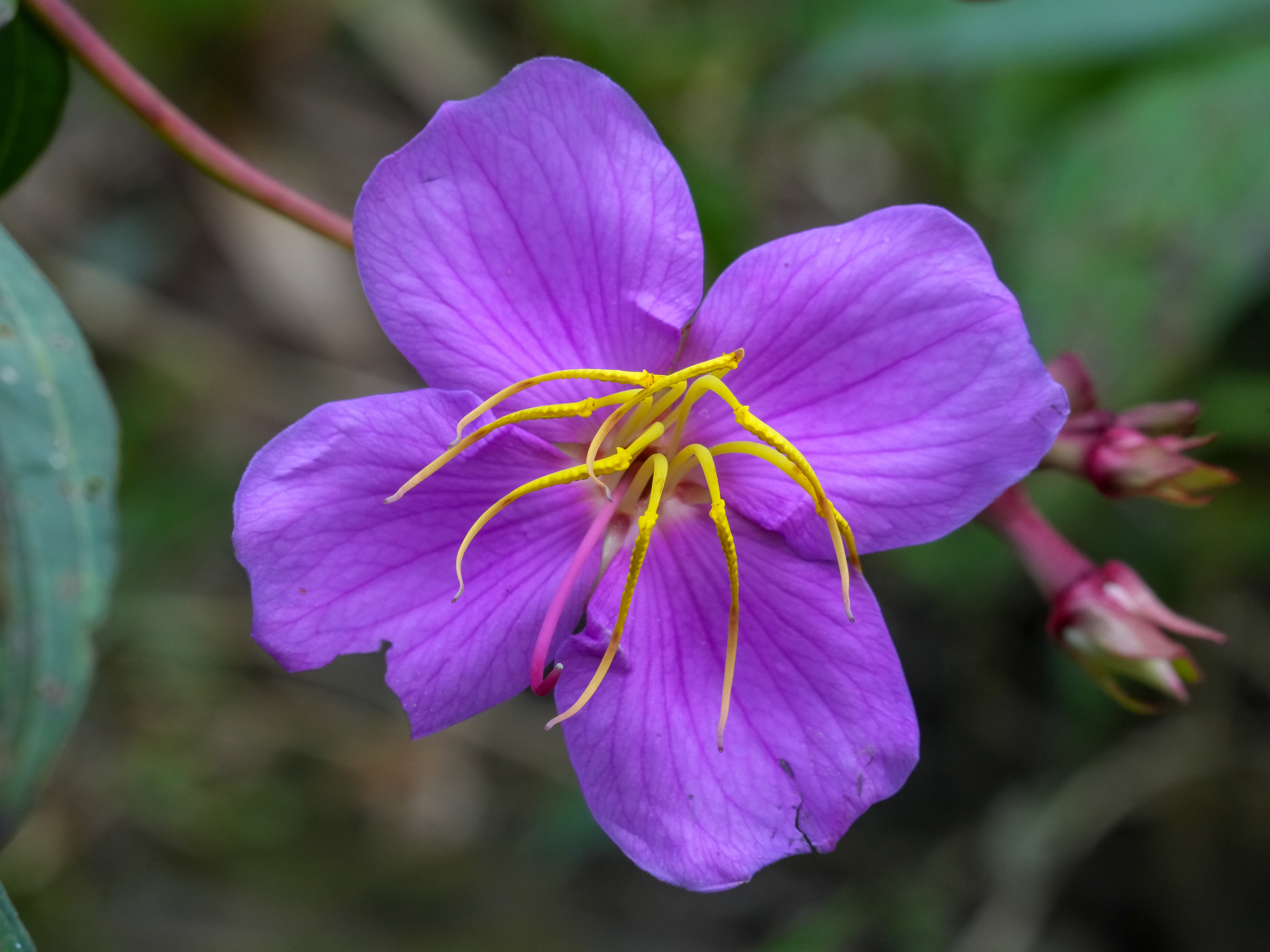
Flower in Siju Wildlife Sanctuary, Meghalaya, India

Osbeckia stellata (Thai: จุกนารี) is a flowering plant in the family Melastomataceae.

It is native to mountainous areas of China, Bhutan, Burma, Cambodia, Laos, Northeast India, Nepal, Thailand and Vietnam. It is usually found on grassy mountain slopes at high altitudes.
