= Baghmara Pitcher Plant Wildlife Sanctuary =

Protected area in Meghalaya, India

- IUCN category IV (habitat/species management area)
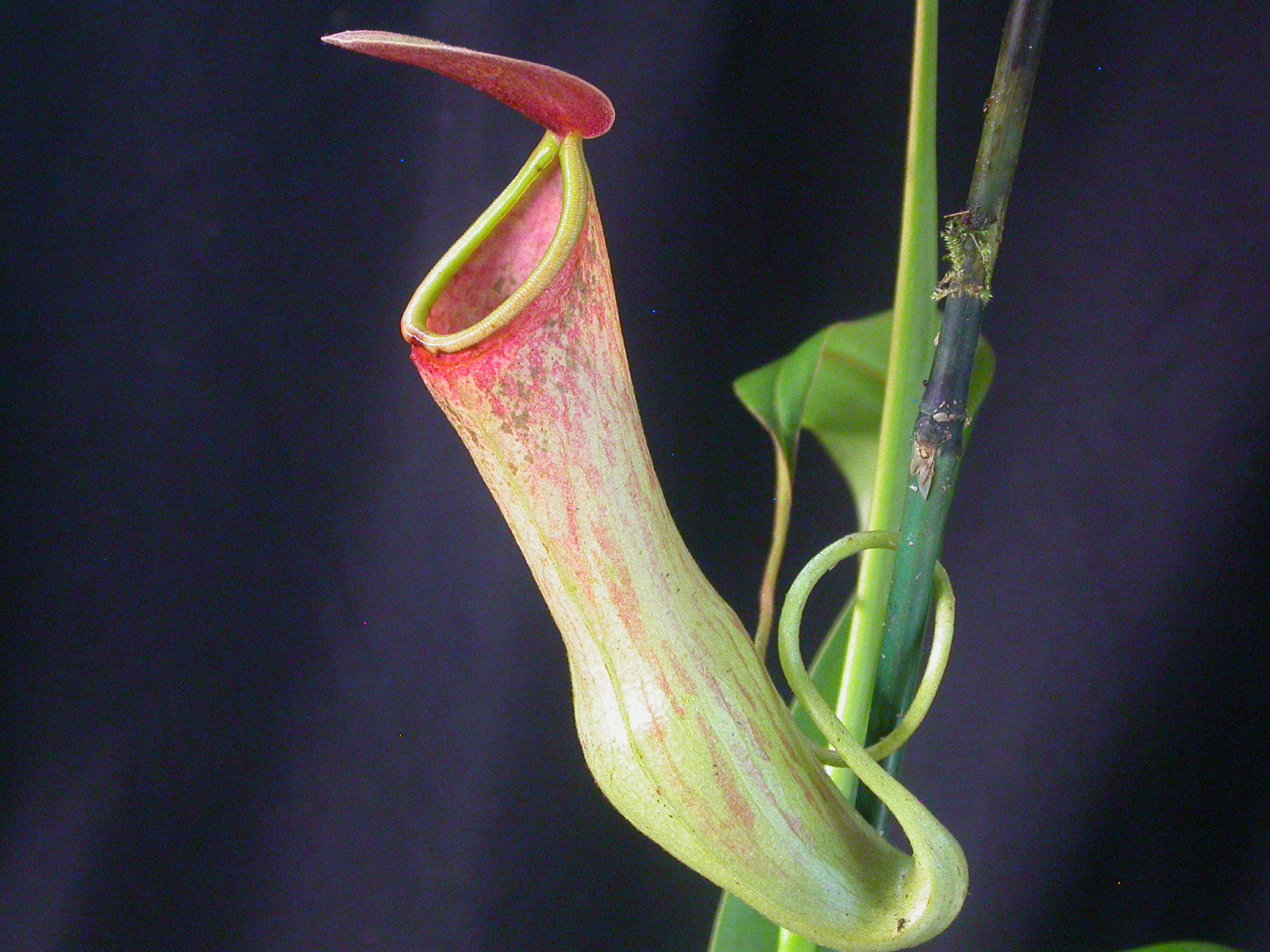
- Interactive map of Baghmara Pitcher Plant Wildlife Sanctuary
- Location: South Garo Hills, Meghalaya, India
- Area: 0.02 km^{2} (0.0077 sq mi)
- Established: 1984

Baghmara Pitcher plant Wildlife Sanctuary or Baghmara Wildlife Sanctuary or Baghmara Reserve Forest is a wildlife sanctuary located in the Indian state of Meghalaya. This wildlife sanctuary is a protected area for pitcher plants.

The site located near the city of Baghmara in South Garo Hills district.

The total reserved forest occupies an area of 2.7 hectares (6.7 acres). Out of which 1.19 square kilometres is notified as Pitcher Plant Sanctuary. The site is 112 km south of Tura.

This sanctuary is known for its population of the endangered pitcher plant species Nepenthes khasiana, locally known Me'mang-Koksi or ghost basket.

The Meghalaya Government declared this area a wildlife sanctuary in July 2022.
