= Malikona =

Village in Meghalaya, India

Coordinates: 25.1936°N 90.6460°E

Malikona is a village in Rongara sub-district, South Garo Hills district, Meghalaya, India. As of the 2011 census, it had 242 people.
