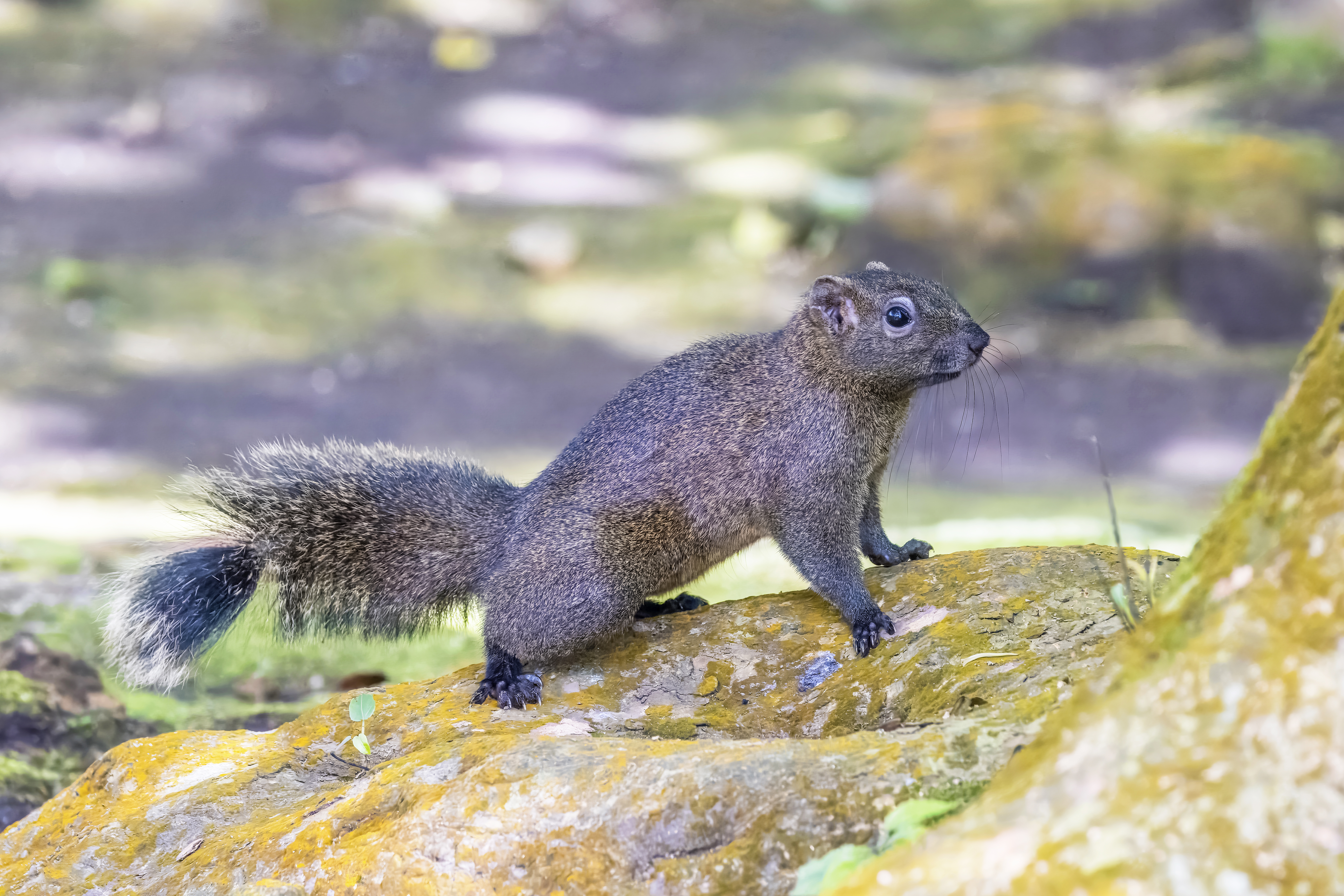
- Callosciurus erythraeus thaiwanensis, Taiwan

Conservation status
- Least Concern (IUCN 3.1)

Scientific classification
- Kingdom: Animalia
- Phylum: Chordata
- Class: Mammalia
- Order: Rodentia
- Family: Sciuridae
- Genus: Callosciurus
- Species: C. erythraeus

Binomial name
- Callosciurus erythraeus (Pallas, 1779)

Subspecies
- About 30; see text
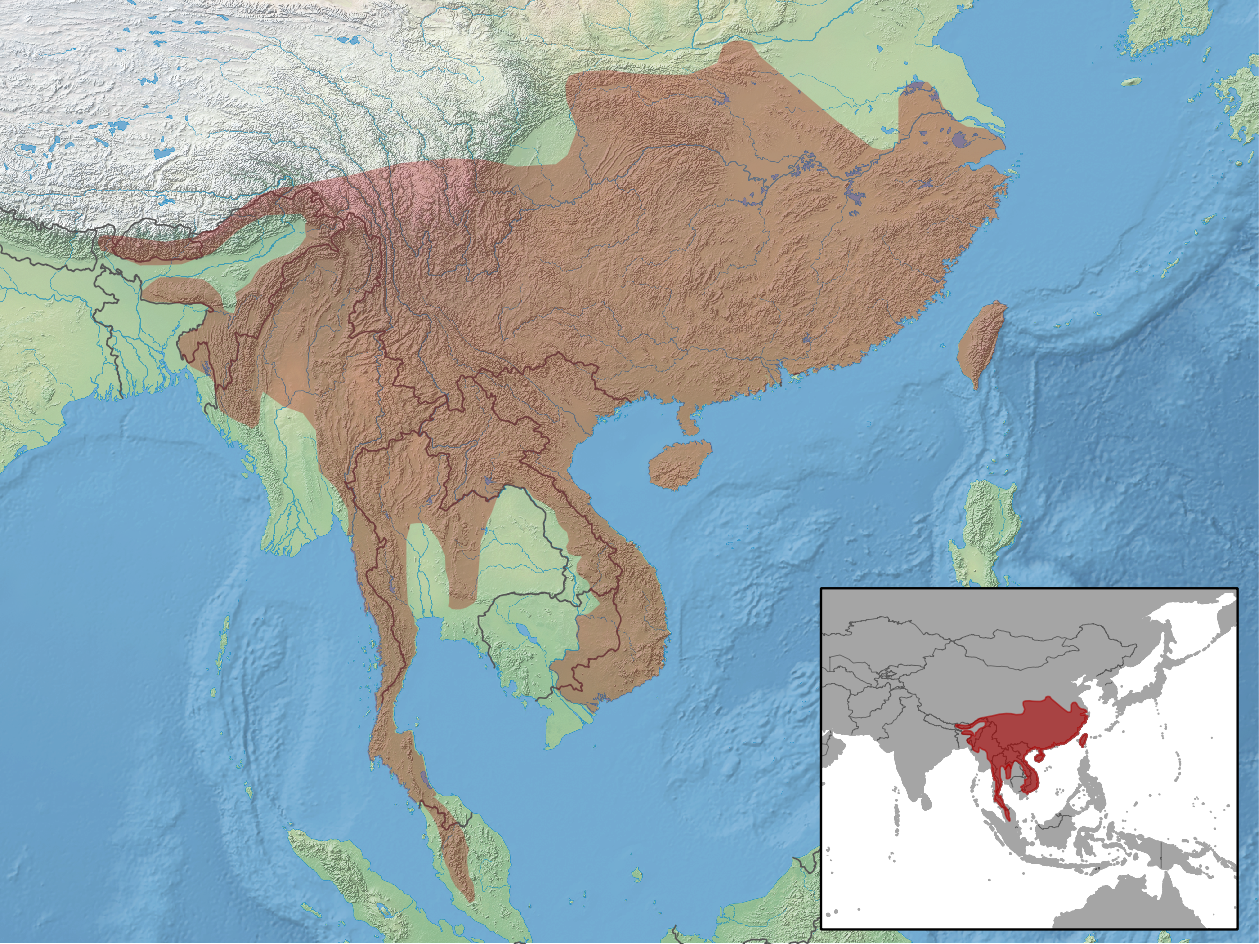

Synonyms
- Callosciurus flavimanus Callosciurus sladeni

= Pallas's squirrel =

Species of squirrel

Pallas's squirrel (Callosciurus erythraeus), also known as the red-bellied tree squirrel, is a species of squirrel native to China, Taiwan, India, Bhutan, and Southeast Asia.

== Description ==
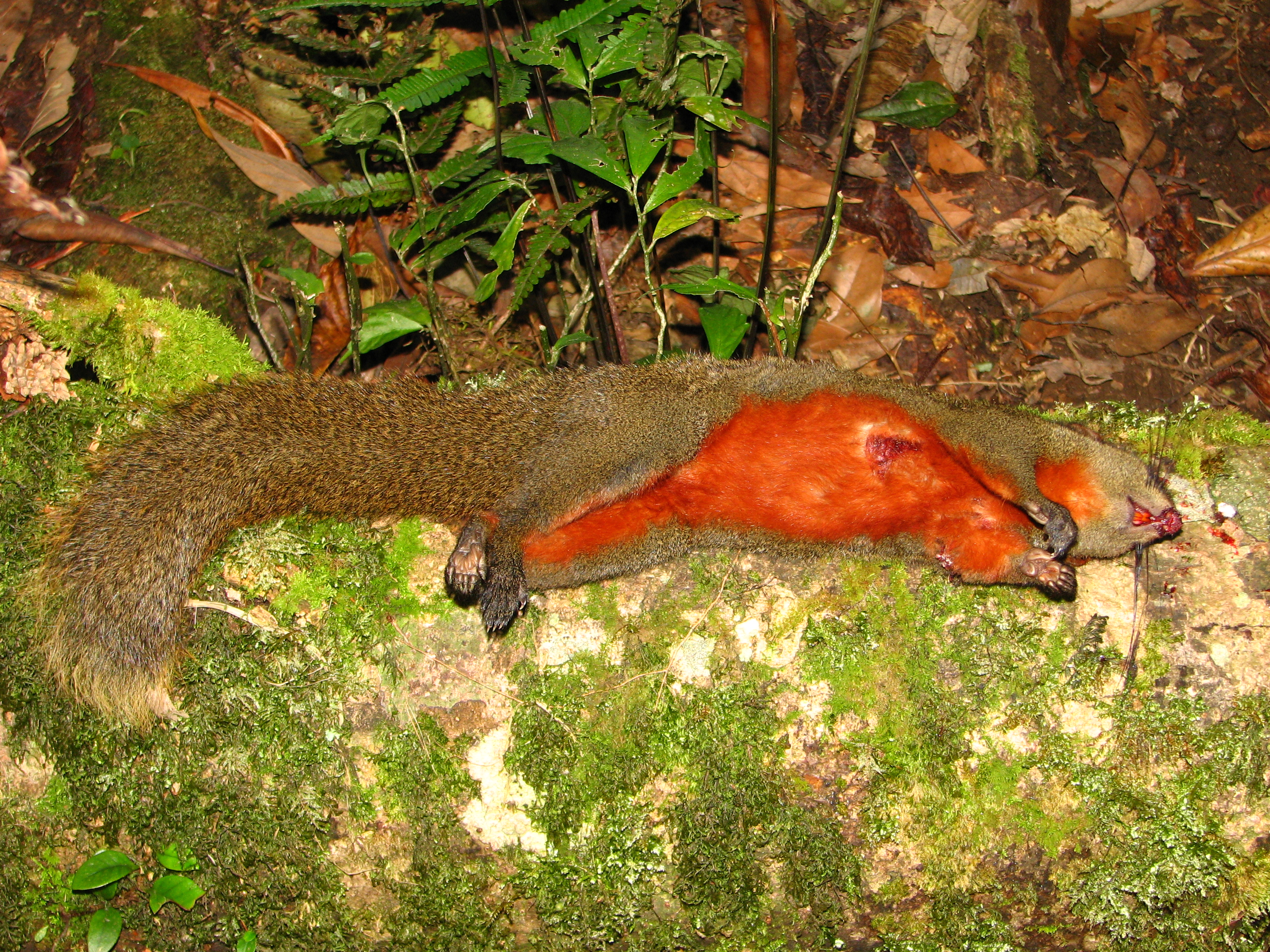
Some populations (this from Arunachal Pradesh, India) have a bright red belly, but in others it is much duller or may only have a reddish/orangish tinge

Pallas's squirrel is a medium-sized tree squirrel, with a head-body length of 16 to 28 cm (6.3 to 11.0 in), and a tail 11 to 26 cm (4.3 to 10.2 in) in length. Both sexes are of similar size and appearance, and weigh between 310 and 460 g (11 and 16 oz). The colour of the pelt varies considerably between the many different subspecies, but is generally brownish on the upper body with a more reddish tint on the belly, and often with some black on the tail. The precise pattern and shades of the fur are often used to distinguish subspecies from one another, but make it difficult to distinguish the species as a whole from other, similarly variable, tree squirrel species.

=== Subspecies ===
Over 30 subspecies have been identified, although not all are recognised by all authorities:

- C. e. erythraeus
- C. e. atrodorsalis
- C. e. bartoni
- C. e. bhutanensis
- C. e. bonhotei
- C. e. castaneoventris
- C. e. erythrogaster
- C. e. flavimanus
- C. e. gloveri
- C. e. gongshanensis
- C. e. gordoni
- C. e. griseimanus
- C. e. griseopectus
- C. e. haringtoni
- C. e. hendeei
- C. e. hyperythrus
- C. e. intermedius
- C. e. michianus
- C. e. ningpoensis
- C. e. pranis
- C. e. qinglingensis
- C. e. rubeculus
- C. e. shanicus
- C. e. siamensis
- C. e. sladeni
- C. e. styani
- C. e. thai
- C. e. thaiwanensis
- C. e. wuliangshanensis
- C. e. wulingshanensis
- C. e. zhaotongensis
- C. e. zimmeensis

== Distribution and habitat ==
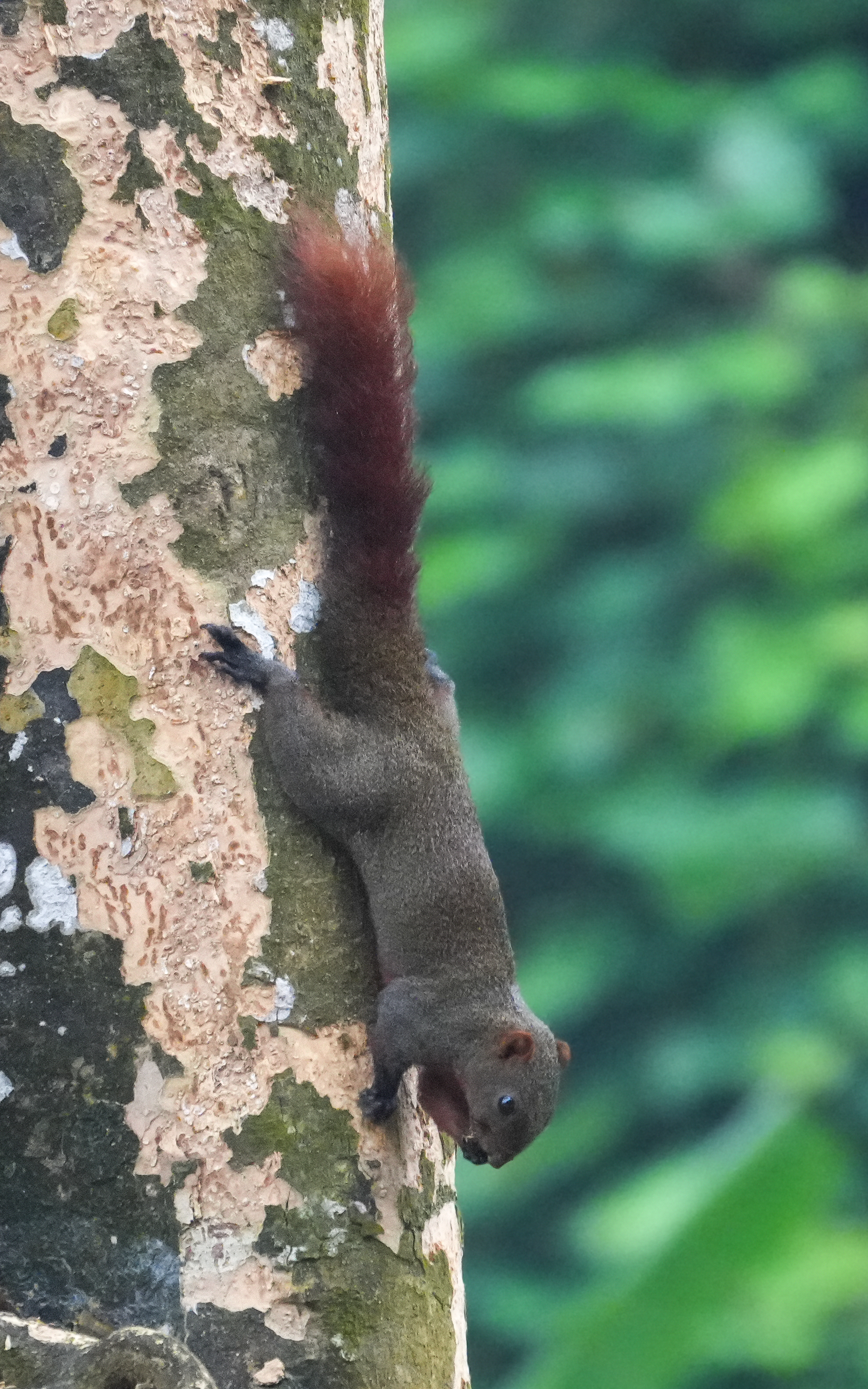
Pallas's squirrel in Siju Wildlife Sanctuary

Pallas's squirrel is found throughout much of southeastern Asia, including far eastern India, Bhutan, northern and eastern Myanmar, Vietnam, parts of Cambodia and Laos, much of Thailand, northern peninsular Malaysia, Taiwan, and southern and eastern China, including Hainan. Within this region, they are found within a range of forest habitats below 3,000 m (9,800 ft) elevation, including tropical and subtropical evergreen, deciduous broadleaf, and subalpine conifer woodlands.

Populations have been introduced in the Buenos Aires Province of Argentina, Dadizele in Belgium (where initially mistaken for Père David's rock squirrel), the Netherlands, Cap d'Antibes in France, and Japan. In these regions it is considered an invasive species, as it can cause considerable damage to trees and may outcompete native wildlife such as the red squirrel. In 2016, the species was included in the European list of Invasive Alien Species of Union concern (the Union list). This implies that it cannot be imported, bred, transported, commercialized, or intentionally released into the environment in the whole of the European Union.

== Biology ==
Like all tree squirrels, Pallas's squirrels are primarily herbivorous. They eat a wide range of different foods, and have differing diets in different parts of their broad range. However, primary foodstuffs include leaves, flowers, seeds, and fruit. They also eat small quantities of insects, as well as occasional bird eggs.

The squirrels breed throughout the year, and may mate again as soon as they have weaned a previous litter. Gestation lasts 47 to 49 days, and results in the birth of up to four young, with two being typical. The young leave the nest at 40 to 50 days old, and are sexually mature at one year of age. They have lived for up to 17 years in captivity.

== Behaviour ==
Pallas's squirrels are diurnal, and inhabit much of the forest canopy, and construct both leaf nests 7 to 18 m (23 to 59 ft) above the ground, and less commonly, in burrows. Females occupy home ranges of just 0.5 to 0.8 hectares (1.2 to 2.0 acres), which usually do not overlap, while males occupy much larger ranges of 1.3 to 3.8 ha (3.2 to 9.4 acres), which overlap with those of both nearby males and females. Like many other squirrels, they have been observed to cache acorns in the autumn.

The squirrels make calls to warn neighbours of predators, and have been observed to mob tree-climbing snakes, with females protecting young being particularly likely to join in. Males also make loud calls both prior to and after mating.

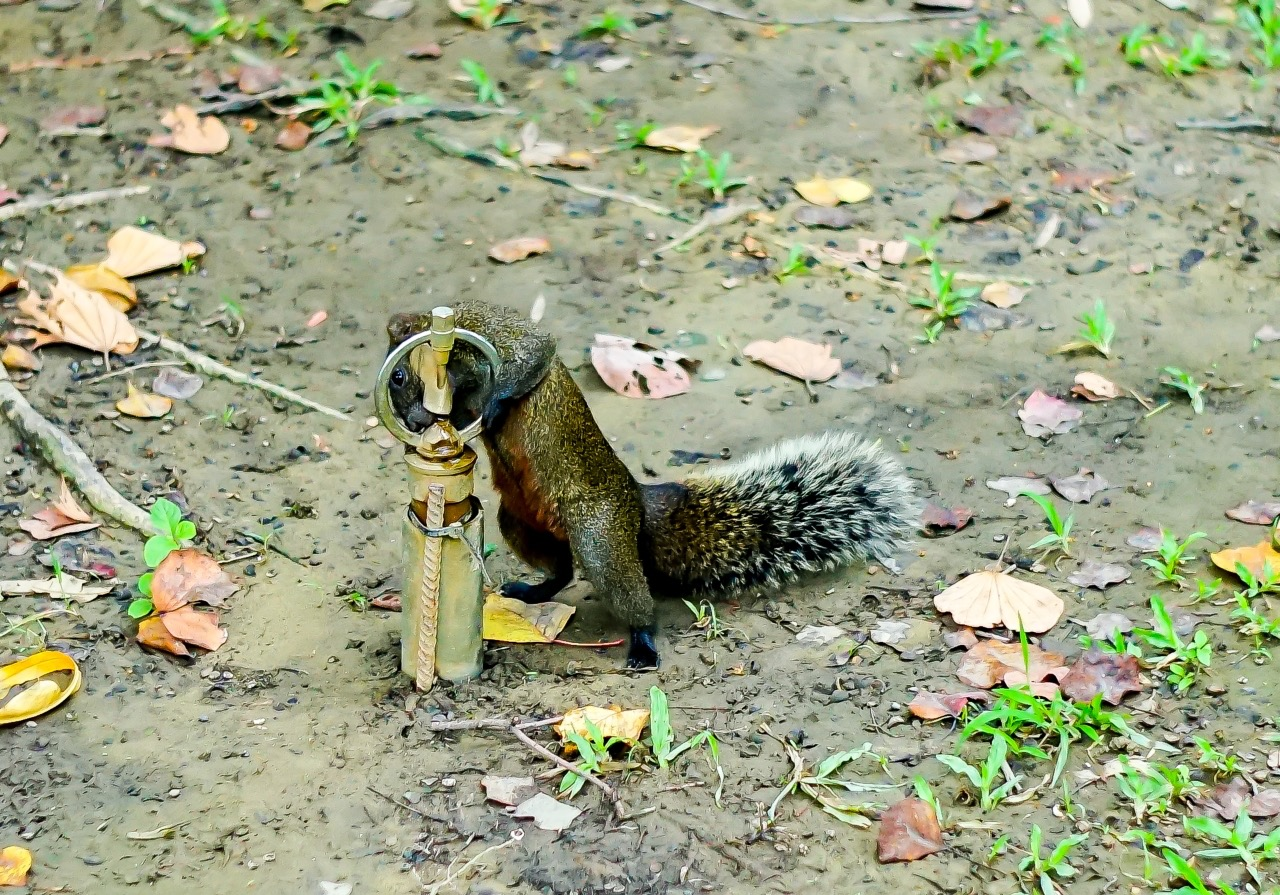
Pallas's squirrel drinking water in a park

in Japan

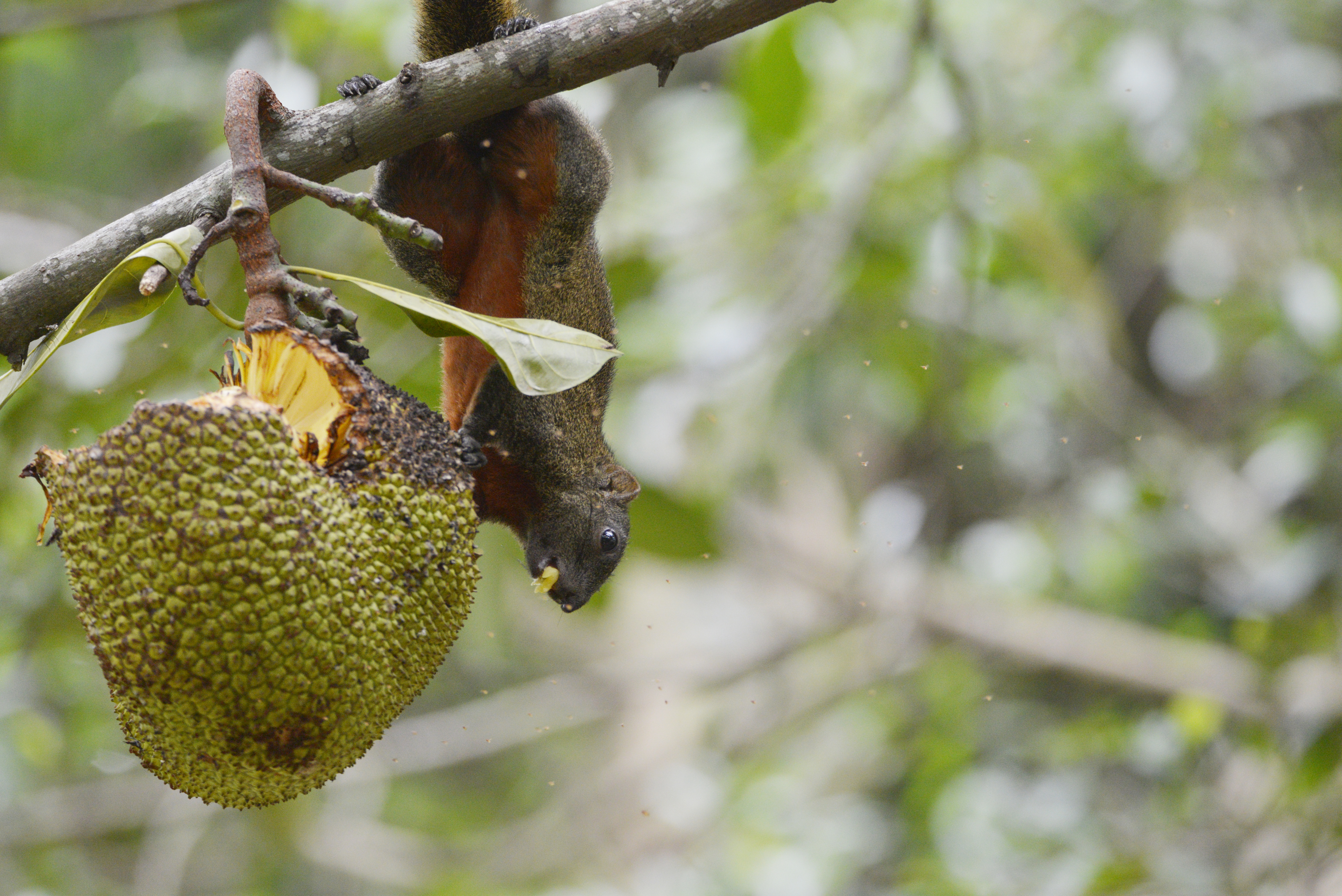
Pallas's squirrel feeding on fruit in Taiwan
