= Baghmara, Meghalaya =

Baghmara Wa'gesik
- City
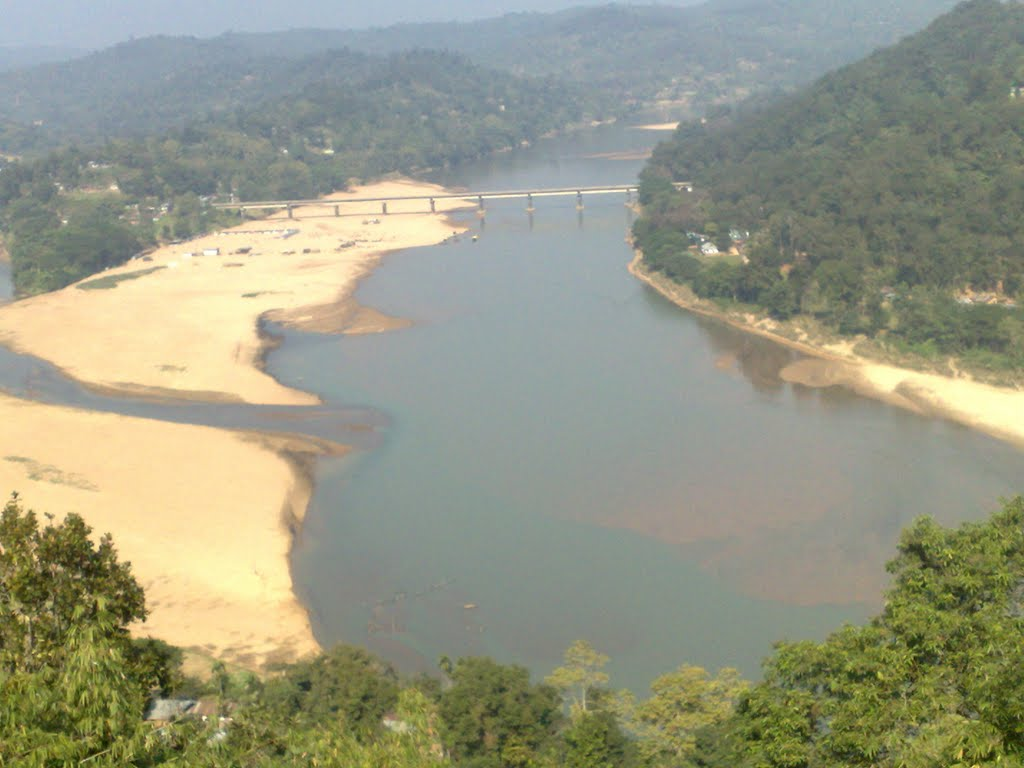
- Baghmara Town

- Location in Meghalaya, India Baghmara (India)
- Coordinates: 25°12′32″N 90°37′42″E
- Country: India
- State: Meghalaya
- District: South Garo Hills
- Founder: Balman A Sangma (Bong)
- Named for: The fight between Bong Lasker and a Bengal Tiger

Population (2011)
  - Total: 13,131

Languages
  - Regional: Garo & Atong
- Time zone: UTC+5:30 (IST)
- PIN: 794 102
- Telephone code: 91 03639
- Vehicle registration: ML-09

Baghmara (IPA: ˌbægˈmɑ:rə) also known as বাঘমারা in Bangla is the headquarters of the South Garo Hills district in the state of Meghalaya in India. The place is bordered by Durgapur Upazilla of Netrokona District of the Mymensingh Division of Bangladesh and is about 113 km from Tura, 248 km from Guwahati, and 287 km from state capital Shillong. The Someshwari River, also known as the Simsang in the Garo language, flows through its expanse and is also covered in hills and tracts along the way. This southern part of the Garo Hills region has several tourist spots and is a tourist destination for both domestic and international tourists.

The Siju Cave is about 45 km away and to get to Siju, one needs to go through Baghmara. The Balphakram National Park is 66 km away and one needs to pass through this town to get there. The modes of transport is limited to buses and jeeps. This place is known for its fish dishes and has a historical sea trading connection with Bangladesh. It is also the native place of the first Chief Minister of Meghalaya Captain Williamson Sangma and he always represented Baghmara constituency.

This place is home to the carnivorous pitcher plant and has the Pitcher plant sanctuary located at Dilsa Hill colony of Baghmara.

== History ==
The name "Baghmara" derived from the fight that took place between Bong Lasker and a wild Bengal tiger where he killed the tiger by crushing the jaws. Hence, the name Baghmara, where, bagh means "tiger" and mara means "died". To remember Bong Lasker, a tomb was built in the heart of Baghmara town. This place was previously known as "Barokar", which means 12 streams. Here "Baro" or "বারো" meaning 12 is also a বাংলা word and "kar" or কার meaning stream in Bangla.

== Demographics ==
As of 2001 India census, Baghmara had a population of 8643. Males constitute 53% of the population and females 47%. Baghmara has an average literacy rate of 70%, higher than the national average of 59.5%; with 55% of the males and 45% of females literate. 16% of the population is under 6 years of age. AS per 2011 Census of India, the population of Baghmara municipality has increased to 13,131 persons.

== Tourism ==
1. Wari Chora - This river canyon lies inside the jungle of South Garo Hills was undiscovered until 2022. A social media trend made the place popular and has led to an inflow of both domestic and international tourists. To visit this place one has to come first to Guwahati and then hire a cab and travel to South Garo Hills district and stay for a night where homestays and guest houses are plentily available. Then the next day, one has to do an arduous one hour or more trekking down the hill to the spot and finally hire a boat to access it.

2. Balpakram National Park - The Garos, mostly non-Christians, believe this place to be the resting place of the departed souls. It was inaugurated as a National Park in December 1987 which hosts various wildlife species ranging from Bengal Tiger, Elephants, Civets, Serows, etc. and due to the presence of such endangered animals it was made a protected area under Wildlife Protection Act of 1972.

3. Siju Cave - Considered one of the longest cave in India with a spanning length of 25 km, it was explored by speleologists Prem Chopra and Stanley kemp in 1922. Locally, it is known as 'Do•bakkol' which means Bat Cave where hundreds of bats call the cave home. Other than bats there are other Troglobites deep inside of it.

== Localities ==
Baghmara is the headquarters of Baghmara block in South Garo Hills district. Populated places within the block include:

- Malikona
- Bolsalgre
- Rangdokram
- Konagittim
- Bolsal A·ding
- A·sim Chiring
- Do·pa Grang
