= South Garo Hills district =

Coordinates: 25°12′N 90°38′E

- District of Meghalaya
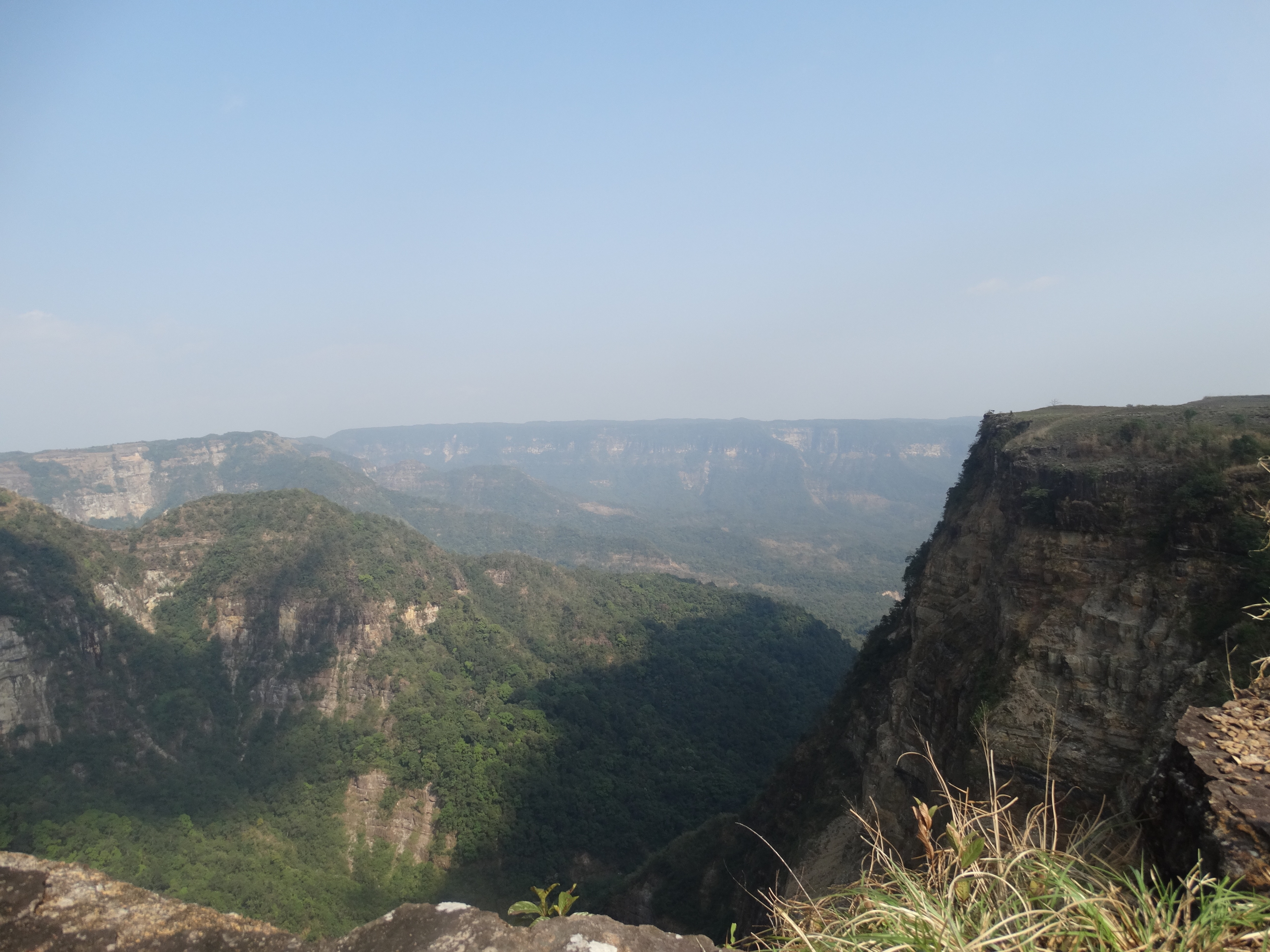
- Balphakram National Park
- South Garo Hills district Location in Meghalaya
- Country: India
- State: Meghalaya
- Headquarters: Baghmara

Government
  - Vidhan Sabha constituencies: 3

Area
  - Total: 1,850 km^{2} (710 sq mi)

Population (2011)
  - Total: 142,334
  - Density: 76.9/km^{2} (199/sq mi)

Demographics
  - Literacy: 53%
- Time zone: UTC+05:30 (IST)
- Website: southgarohills.gov.in

South Garo Hills district is an administrative district in the state of Meghalaya in India. As of 2011 it is the least populous district of Meghalaya (out of 7). The district was established in 1992.

== Geography ==
The district headquarters are located at Baghmara. The district occupies an area of 1850 km^{2}. South Garo Hills has only 5 assembly constituency at that time but presently it has 3.

== Economy ==
In 2006 the Ministry of Panchayati Raj named South Garo Hills one of the country's 250 most backward districts (out of a total of 640). It is one of the three districts in Meghalaya currently receiving funds from the Backward Regions Grant Fund Programme (BRGF).

== Administrative divisions ==
South Garo Hills district is divided into four blocks:

Name	Headquarters	Population	Location
Baghmara	Baghmara		
Chokpot	Chokpot		
Gasuapara	Nagrajora		
Rongara	Rongara		

== Demographics ==
According to the 2011 census South Garo Hills district has a population of 142,334, roughly equal to the nation of Saint Lucia. This gives it a ranking of 604th in India (out of a total of 640). The district has a population density of 77 inhabitants per square kilometre (200/sq mi) . Its population growth rate over the decade 2001-2011 was 41.19%. South Garo Hills has a sex ratio of 944 females for every 1000 males, and a literacy rate of 72.39%. Scheduled Tribes make up 94.31% of the population.

Religion in South Garo Hills (2011)
Religions
Christians	93.43%
Hindus	4.94%
Muslims	0.74%
Other or not stated	0.89%

=== Languages ===
Languages of South Garo Hills district (2011)
1. Garo (91.8%)
2. Bengali (1.95%)
3. Others (6.29%)

Garo is the main language. Some speakers of other languages record their language as Garo in the census. Languages spoken here include A'Tong, a Tibeto-Burman language spoken by 10,000 people in Bangladesh and India.

== Flora and fauna ==
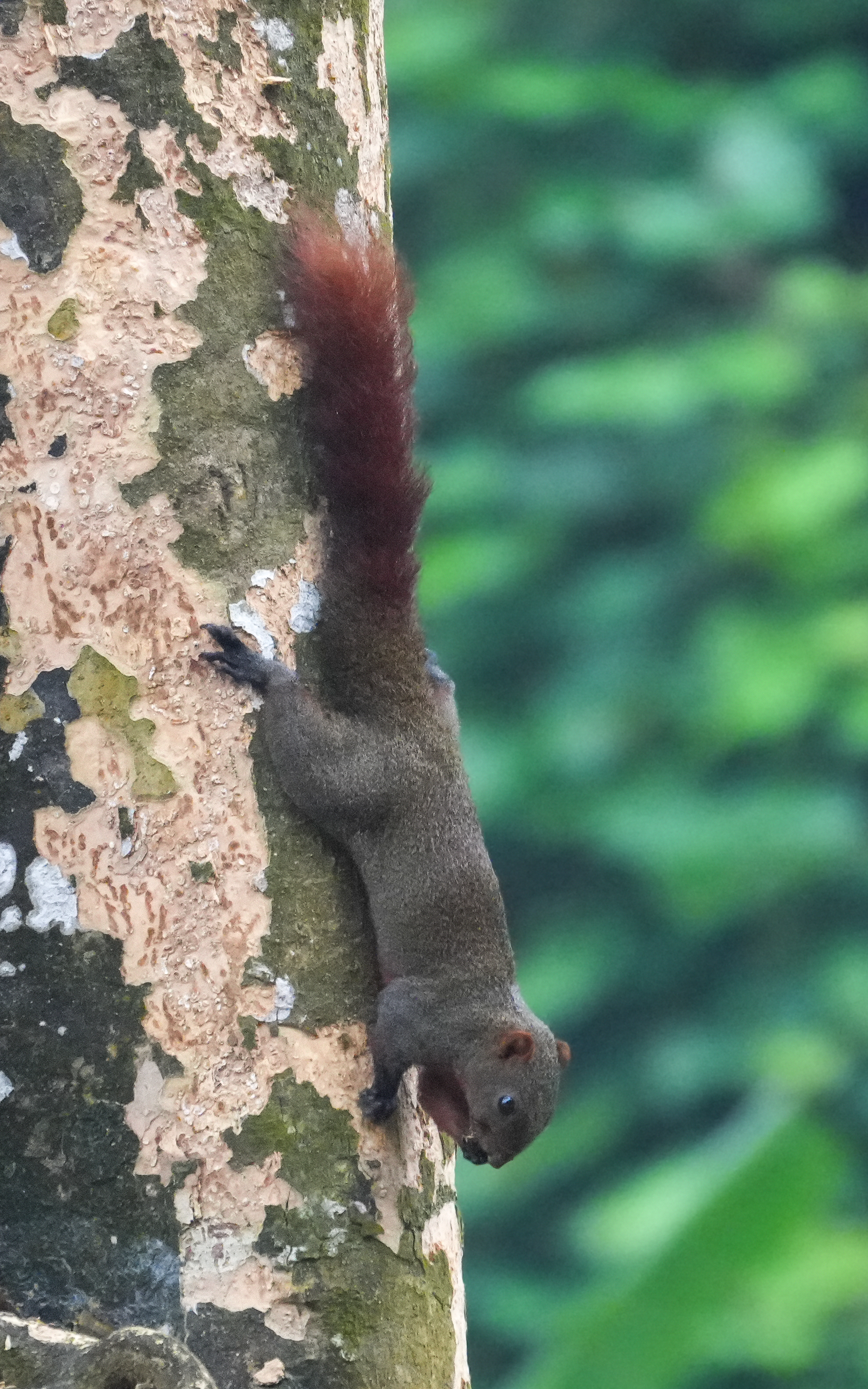
Pallas's squirrel (Callosciurus erythraeus) in Siju Wildlife Sanctuary

In 1986 South Garo Hills district became home to Balphakram National Park, which has an area of 220 km^{2} (84.9 mi^{2}). It shares Nokrek National Park (47 km^{2} (18.1 mi^{2}), established in 1986) with two other districts.

It is also home to the Siju and Baghmara Pitcher Plant Wildlife Sanctuaries.

At least one species of gecko, Cyrtodactylus karsticolus is endemic to the area.
