= Balpakram National Park =

National park in Meghalaya, India

- IUCN category II (national park)
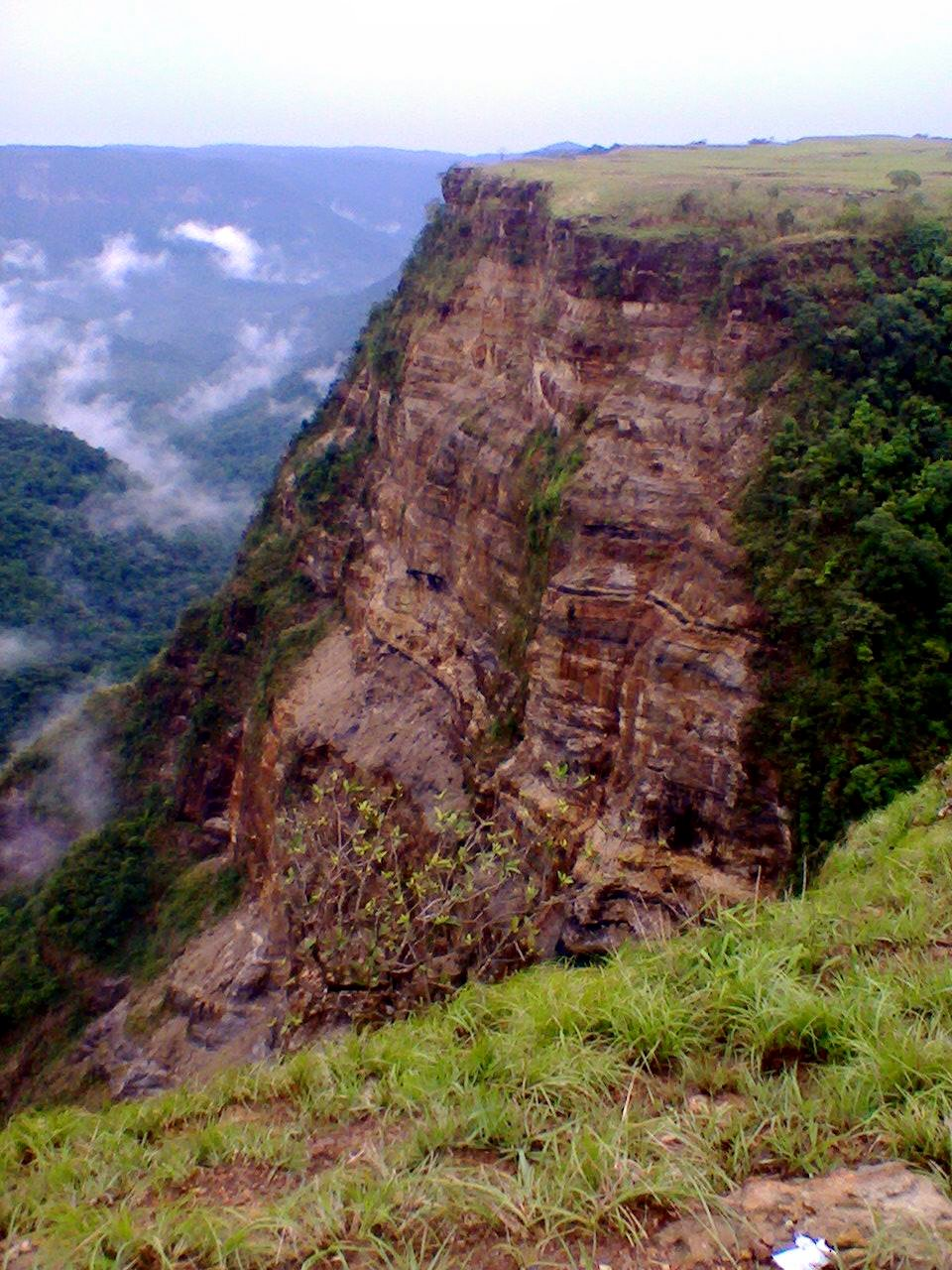
- Balpakram Canyon

- Location within Meghalaya Location within India
- Interactive map of Balpakram National Park
- Location: South Garo Hills of Meghalaya
- Nearest city: Baghmara
- Coordinates: 25°25′N 90°52′E
- Area: 220 km^{2} (85 sq mi)
- Established: 27 December 1987; 38 years ago
- Governing body: Government of Meghalaya, Government of India

Balpakram National Park is a national park in South Garo Hills in Meghalaya, India, located at an elevation of about 910 m (3,000 ft) close to the international border with Bangladesh. It was inaugurated in December 1987 and provides habitat for barking deer, Asian golden cat, Bengal tiger, marbled cat, wild water buffalo, red panda and Indian elephant. Balpakram means "land of the eternal wind" according to the myth of the Garo people.

== UNESCO tentative list ==
The Central government of India has nominated the Garo Hills Conservation Area (GHCA), straddling South and West Garo Hills district in Meghalaya, as a World Heritage Site, which includes Balpakram National Park. It has been listed in UNESCO World Heritage tentative list.

== Flora and fauna ==
Balpakram National Park is home to a wide variety of plants and animals. Its vegetation consists of subtropical, grassland, bamboo forest, tropical deciduous trees and carnivorous plants like the pitcher-plant and Drosera.

Species recorded include Indian elephant, chital deer, wild water buffalo, red panda, Bengal tiger, and marbled cat. The rivers and lakes in the wildlife reserve are home to various species of birds.

== Balpakram myths ==
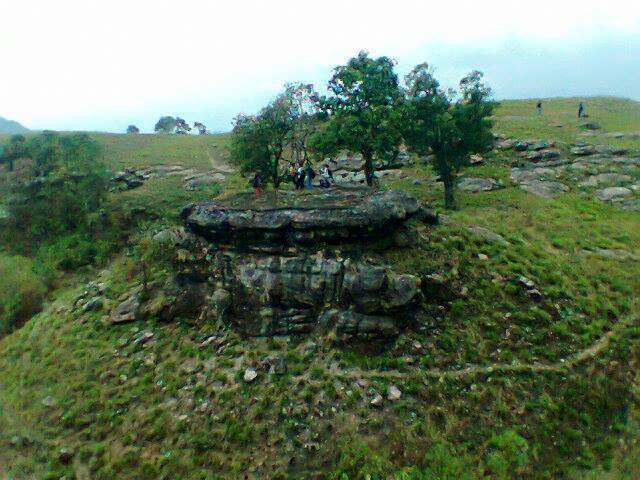

A Schima wallichii tree has a depression on its trunk. Local people believe that it was caused by spirits that take rest here on their way to their abode of the dead and tether animals killed on their funeral.
