= Bansamgre =

Village in Meghalaya, India

Bansamgre is a village in Samanda block, East Garo Hills district of Meghalaya state of India.
