= Samanda block =

Community development block in Meghalaya, India

Samanda block is a Community Development Block in East Garo Hills district, Meghalaya state, India. As of the 2011 Census of India, the total population of the block was 56,235.

== Villages ==
As of the 2011 Census of India, the block contains 148 villages.

- Adugre
- Akel Agalgre
- Akelgre
- Ampanggre
- Asa Bibra
- Asimgre
- Asiragre
- Bande Ampang
- Bandigre
- Bangong Bingbanggre
- Bangong Gittinggre
- Bangong Imsokgre
- Bangong Singwegre
- Bansam Awe
- Bansam Kakwagre
- Bansamgre
- Bansinggre
- Bawe Duragre
- Bawegre
- Bilgipgre
- Bolkinggre
- Chachat Jangkigre
- Chachat Karubra
- Chachatgre
- Chekwe Bibra
- Chima Dachitgittim
- Chimagre Gradekgittim
- Chimagre Songgital
- Chiminminggre
- Chiokgre
- Chiranggre
- Chiringgre
- Chonggigre
- Daribokgre
- Dawa Chipitgre
- Dawa Gittinggre
- Dawa Kosigittin
- Dawa Matchakolgre
- Dawa Nengjata
- Dawa Nengkatok
- Dawa Songgittal
- Demogre
- Denggagre Songgital
- Dilma Debrakgre
- Dilma Dilsek
- Dilma Gandinanggre
- Dilma Kawak
- Dilma Rimtonggre
- Dilma Songgital
- Dilma Songgitcham
- Dinajekgre
- Dinaminggre
- Dobet Kolgre Apotgittim
- Doktilgre
- Dolwarigre
- Dombegre
- Dorakgre
- Dorengkigre
- Ganing Bibra
- Ganinggre
- Gitokgre
- Gonggre
- Gongnagre
- Jakopgre
- Jaljenggre
- Jingamgre
- Jongmegre
- Kakwa Bawegre
- Kakwa Duragre
- Kakwa Rongbokgre
- Kakwa Songma
- Kalak Dorek
- Kalak Songgital
- Kalak Songgitcham
- Mandal Nokwat
- Mandalgipi
- Mandalgre
- Mangrugre
- Matchok Akawe
- Megagre Songgital
- Megagre Songgitcham
- Mejaligre
- Meronggre
- Nabokgre
- Naregre
- Nengkra Awe
- Nengkra Bolsalgre
- Nengkra Watregrittim
- Nengmandalgre
- Nengsitgre
- New Chidekgiri
- New Rangmalgre
- Pakwakgre
- Patalgre
- Pillonggre
- Ragitikgre
- Rambogre
- Rangmalgre Songgitcham
- Rapdikgre
- Rengregre
- Rongakgre
- Rongalgre
- Rongatagre
- Rongbing Apot
- Rongbing Boldak
- Rongbing Dalbot
- Rongbinggre
- Rongchek Chambugong
- Rongchek Manda
- Rongkem
- Rongkinggre
- Rongongre
- Rongregre
- Rongrekgre
- Rongribo Amalgre
- Rongribo Chibolgre
- Rongribo Gongmagre
- Rongribo Kamagre
- Rongribo Kimemanggre
- Rongribo Retenggre
- Rongribo Watregre
- Rongsak Bazar
- Rongsak Songgital
- Rongsak Songma
- Rukalgre
- Samanda Bolwarigre
- Samanda Chinemgre
- Samanda Grenanggre
- Samanda Megapgre
- Samanda Patranggre
- Samanda Prapgre
- Samanda Rikwarenggre
- Samanda Wagetgre
- Sampalgre
- Sawilgre
- Siso Bibra
- Sobokgre
- Sobokgre B
- Songma Adinggre
- Songma Enggok
- Songmagre
- Suchilgre Songgital
- Suchilgre Songgitcham
- Tongbol Songgitcham
- Tongbolgre Kamagre
- Udugre
- Wakgitcho
- Wannanggre
