= Chandigre =

- Village
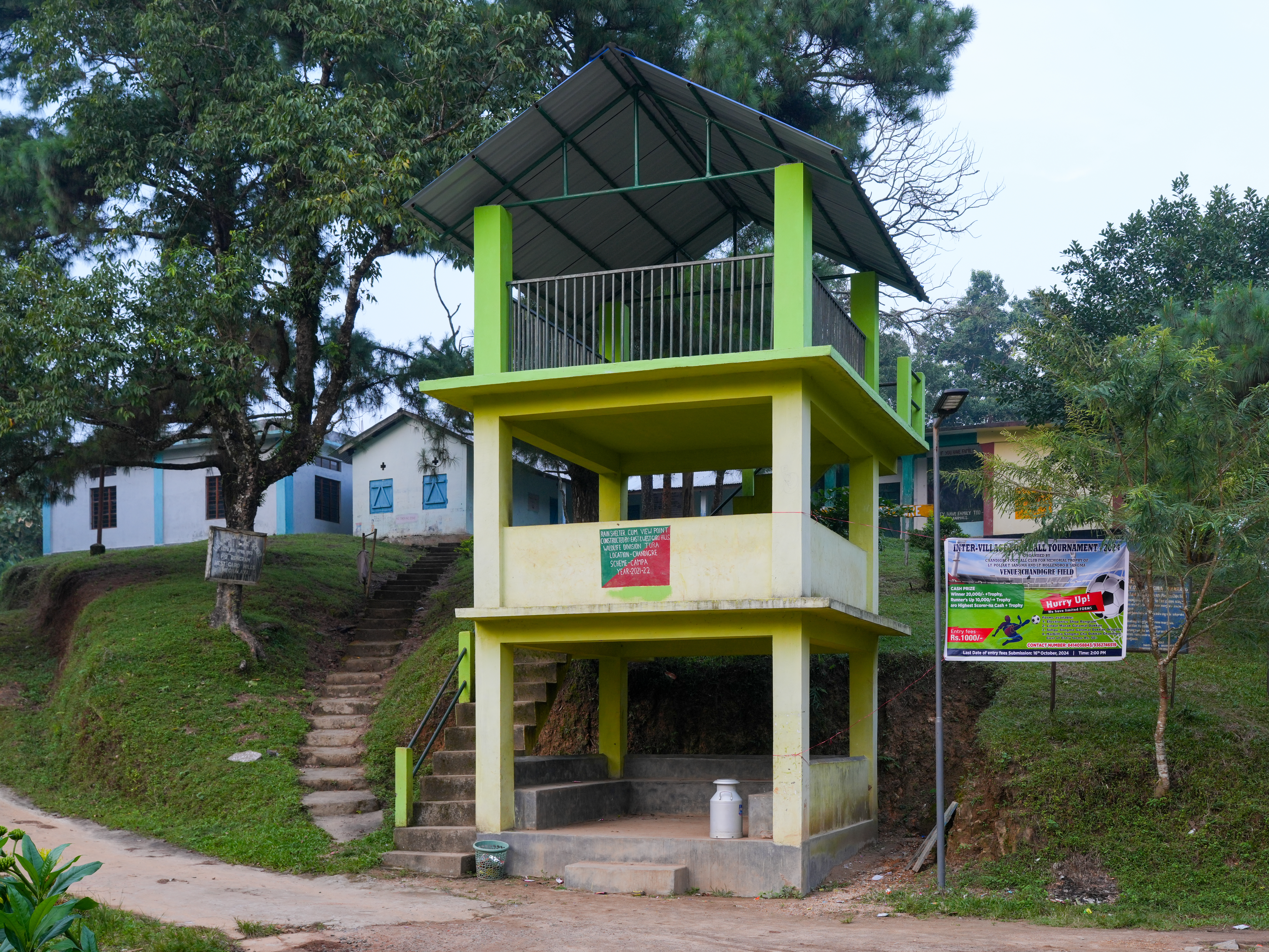
- Rain shelter cum view tower

- Location within Meghalaya
- Coordinates: 25.527269°N 90.327383°E
- Country: India
- State: Meghalaya
- Elevation: 810 m (2,660 ft)

Population (2011)
  - Total: 454

Languages
  - Official: English
- Time zone: UTC+5:30 (IST)
- Postal Index Number: 794002
- Website: https://westgarohills.gov.in/

Chandigre is a village in the West Garo Hills district, Meghalaya, India. Chandigre is located close to the Nokrek Biosphere Reserve. The economy is largely agrarian, following the traditional jhum system of rotational slash-and-burn cropping to a limited extent. Most of the houses are traditional bamboo buildings. The Chandigre Rural Tourist Resort offers tourists an experience of the traditional Garo way of life.

== Description ==
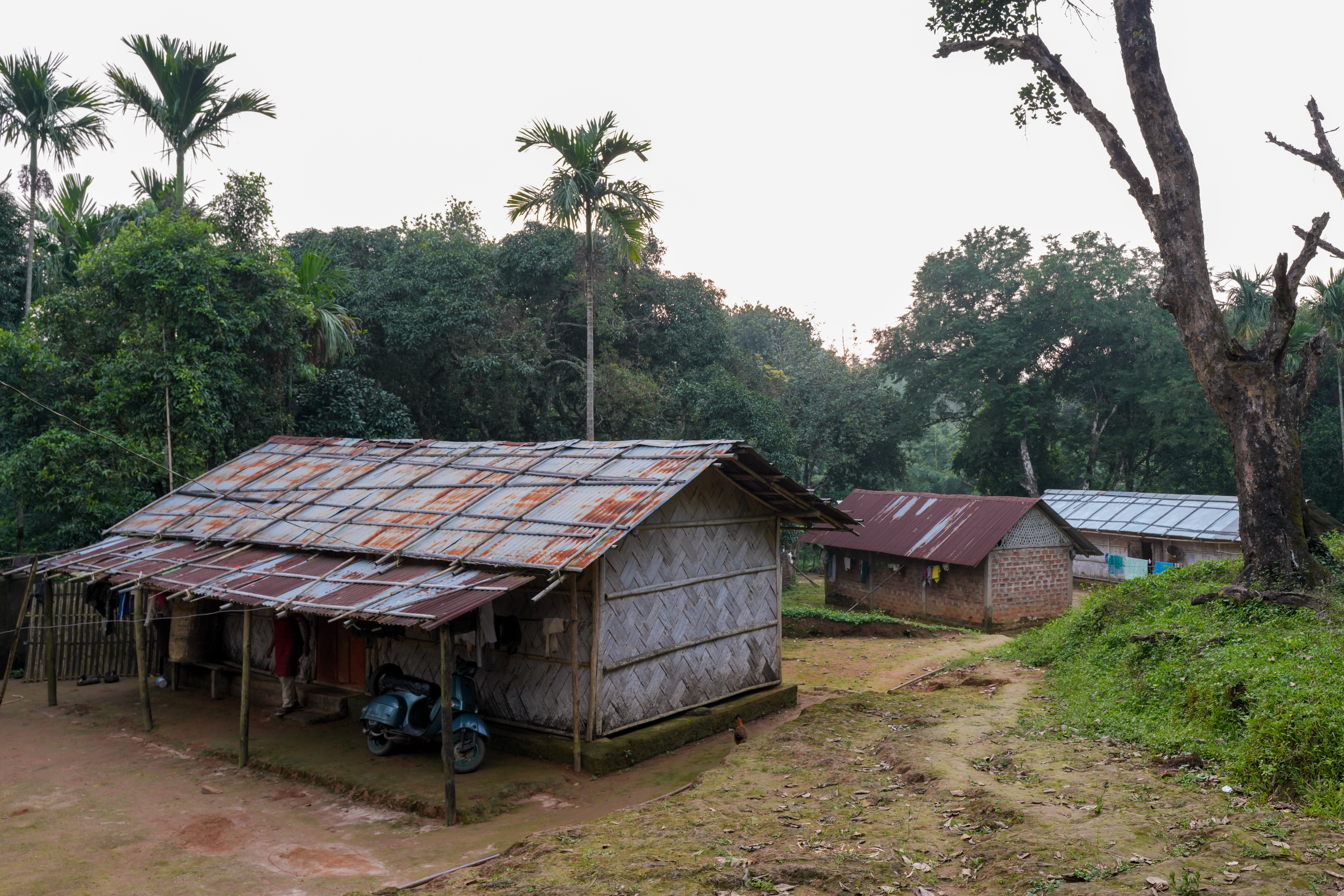
Traditional bamboo houses (front and back) with corrugated iron roofs. Newer brick house in the middle. Ca. October 2024

Chandigre village is located in the Rongram Community & Rural Development (C&RD) block in the West Garo Hills district of Meghalaya. It falls under the North Tura Meghalaya assembly constituency and the North Tura Lok Sabha constituency. The houses are large bamboo structures called Nokmong. Each accommodates one family. Alongside are granaries (Jam nok), woodsheds and pig sties.

== Geography ==
Chandigre is situated in the West Garo Hills at an elevation of 810 m (2,660 ft). The West Garo Hills run from east to west in the western part of Meghalaya, in the bend of the Brahmaputra river as it turns from west to south. The distance from Chandigre to Asananggre, headquarters of the Rongram C&RD Block, is 20.5 km (12.7 mi), and to Tura, district headquarters, is 30 km (19 mi). Shillong, the capital of Meghalaya, is 297 km (185 mi) distant.

=== Climate ===
Chandigre has a tropical climate, hot and humid during the summer and rainy season (March - October) and pleasantly cool during the short winter (December - February). June - August is the period of heavy rain.

== Demographics ==
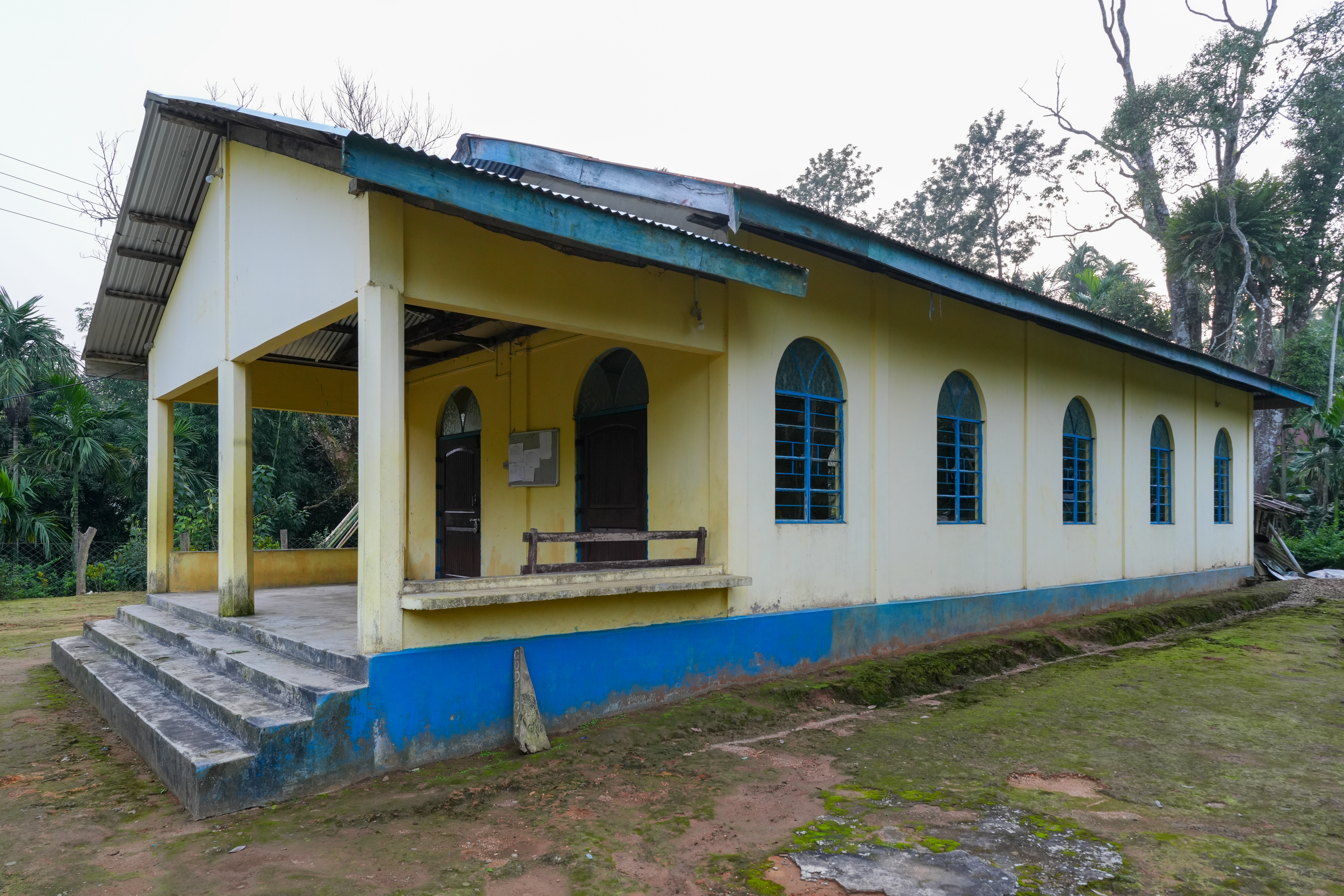
Chandigre Baptist Church

In 2011, the total population was 454 in 74 households. Among these 49.1% were female. There were no scheduled castes while over 95% belonged to scheduled tribes. The literacy rate was 68.9%. Chandigre is predominantly Christian, although in the rural areas of the West Garo Hills District as a whole, Christians were 59.0%, Muslims comprised 18.6% and Hindus were 18.3%.

== Governance ==
Traditionally, the village was governed by one or more male nokmas (headmen). These are selected from the leading households of the village based on lineage. The nokma in consultation with the households allots the plots for jhumming every year. He also is responsible for settling disputes. As the Garo society is matrilinal, the nokma typically looks for a young man from his own lineage to marry his daughter. The son-in-law then inherits the household and becomes nokma when the father-in-law dies.

The system has evolved after Indian Independence. The Garo Hills Autonomous District Council passed the Garo Hills District (Jhum) Regulation Act, 1954 that confers on the nokma the right to allot jhum land. However, disputes related to allotment are now referred to the Village Council instead of being resolved by the nokma. Village Councils were created based on the Constitution of Village Council Act in 1958. The Village Council is intended to make each village a self-sufficient, efficiently administered unit. It is responsible for maintenance of public paths, roads, wells, tanks, etc., for registration of births and deaths and other record keeping, etc.

=== Chandigre Community Reserve ===
Since 2013, the Forest Department, Government of Meghalaya has declared 64 Community Reserves under the Wild Life (Protection) Act, 1972. The Chandigre Community Reserve with an area of 37 ha (91 acres) was notified on 10 July 2013. The notification gives complete control of the Community Reserve to the community to protect the flora and fauna, and the traditional conservation values and practices. All traditional rites and rituals are permitted, though hunting is not allowed. The Reserve is managed by the Chandigre Community Reserve Management Committee.

== Amenities ==
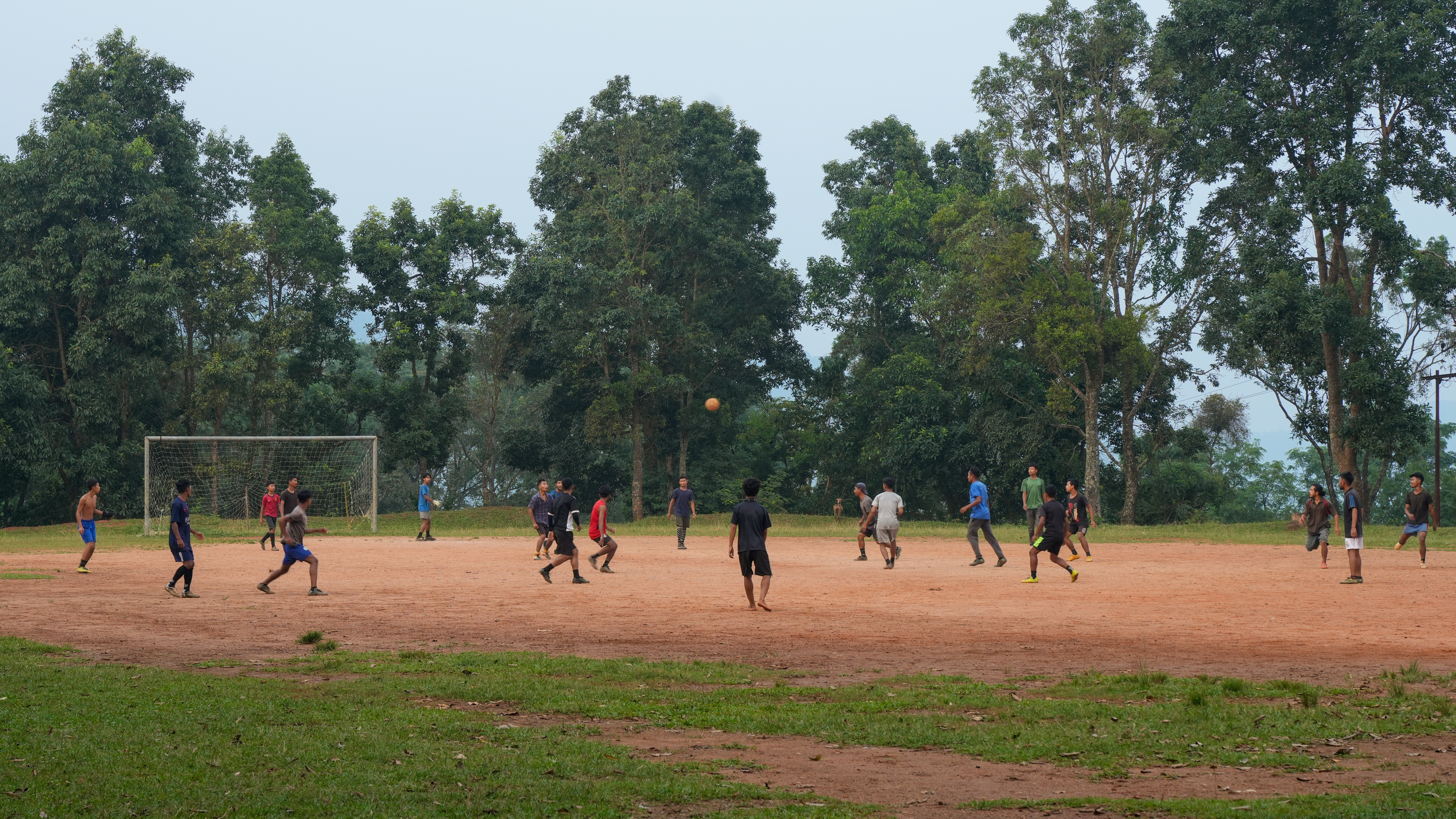
Football field near the Rural Tourist Resort

As of 2011, pre-primary, primary and middle schooling were available within 5 km (3.1 mi) of Chandigre. For secondary school and higher education, students had to commute more than 10 km (6.2 mi). The village has several water sources including piped water, well water and springs. Mobile telephony and electricity supply are available. The village has a sports field. The village pincode is 794002 though there is no post office.

== Economy ==
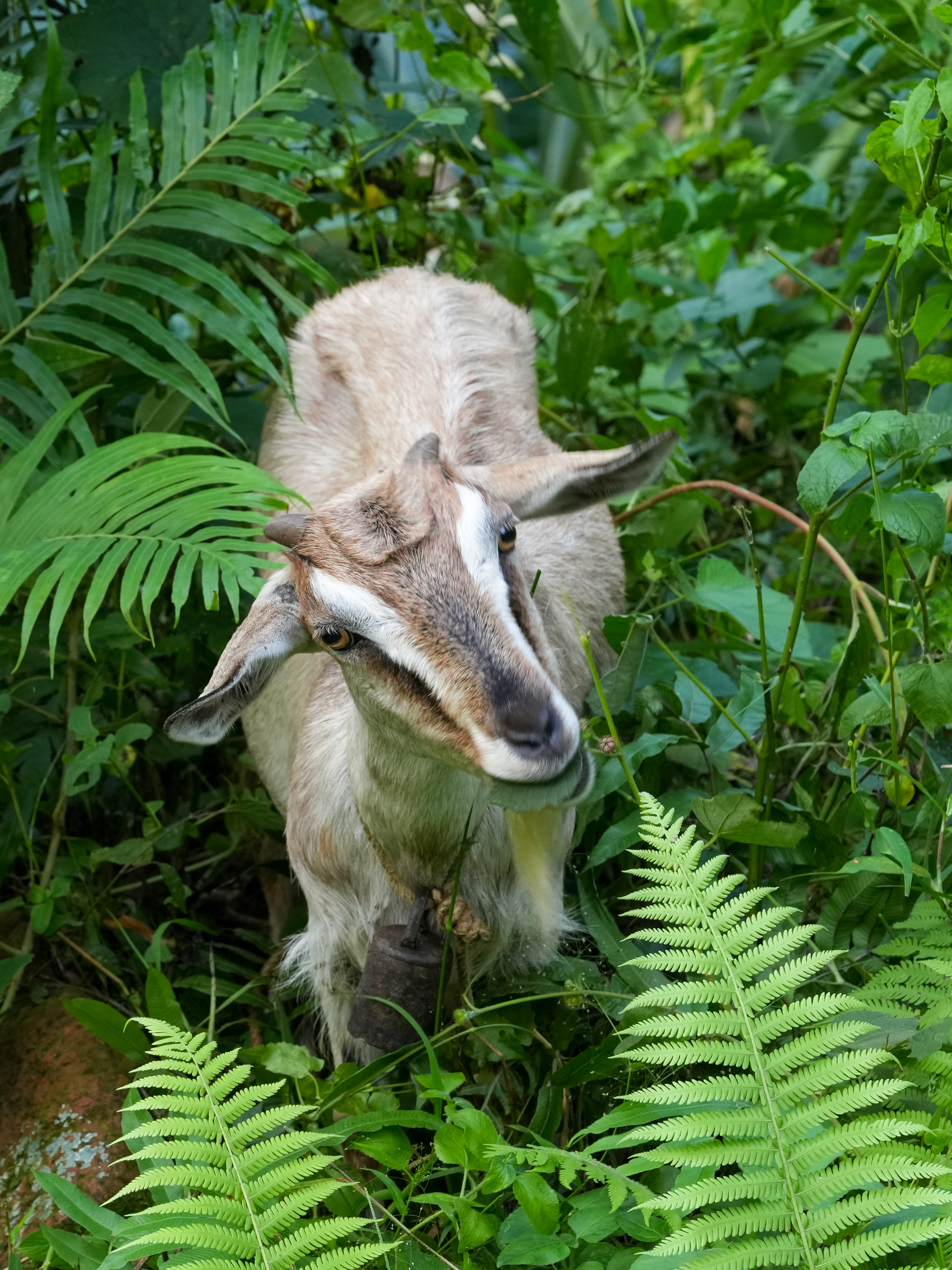
Domestic goat foraging by the roadside

The economy is largely agrarian. In 2011, people cultivating their own or leased land comprised 75% of the main workers (those employed for >6 months in a year). Weaving of cane and bamboo products is done by households mostly for their own use, also increasingly for sale to tourists. They make bamboo mats, kok (traditional baskets), and a variety of containers.

=== Agriculture ===
The traditional jhum system of rotational cropping is followed to a limited extent. In the jhum system, A'king land is owned by the community. Each year, the Nokma allots plots of A'king land to each household for pre-determined crops. After 2 years of use, a plot is left fallow for 6–8 years during which scrub forest grows. When the plot is again allotted for cropping, the scrub forest is cleared and burnt in a planned operation. This traditional cycle of 'slash-and-burn' rotational cultivation is believed to be sustainable ecologically and culturally.

In the first year, the plot is used for vegetables such as sweet potato, ginger, varieties of beans, sugarcane, onions, etc. In the second year, grains such as rice, maize or millet are grown on the plot. Bananas, oranges and pineapples are also grown. Gourds and squashes are grown on frames or on the walls of houses. In some plots, cash crops such as areca, cotton and chilli peppers are planted. The planting of vegetables is somewhat random, adding variety to the diet and improving the soil health. In a few low lying plots, rice is cultivated continuously.

In recent times, some families took advantage of a custom that permitted planting of crops on any land not already covered by the jhum system. They constructed permanent fields in low-lying areas to grow wet rice. Some also planted pineapples, tea, coffee, oranges and areca palms. These families moved their houses away from the central village to the location of their permanent fields. Such permanent fields can be surveyed by the district administration and title (patta) granted to the cultivators. With the title comes the obligation to pay taxes, which is not the case with jhum land. These developments have created greater inequality in the village.

=== Animal husbandry ===
Raising of livestock is common though secondary to agriculture. The main animals are cattle, goats, pigs and fowl.

== Transport ==
Chandigre is connected to important places in the district by black-topped roads. The Meghalaya Transport Corporation buses run at infrequent intervals. Many private buses serve the district regularly. Taxis, vans and cycle rickshaws are available for hire. The nearest railway station and airport are in Guwahati, Assam, at distances of 211 km (131 mi) and 195 km (121 mi) respectively.

== Tourism ==
The Chandigre Rural Tourist Resort is an initiative of the Meghalaya Basin Development Authority (MBDA) aimed at giving visitors an experience of authentic Garo lifestyle. Funded by the Ministry of Tourism, Government of India and the Government of Meghalaya, the Resort is run by the village community. The Resort was opened to the public on 9 January 2013. It is the second such project by the MBDA, the first being Ghasura Park, Ampati, South West Garo Hills district.

Chandigre was chosen for the Tourism Resort because of its proximity to several tourist attractions. It is close to the Nokrek Biosphere Reserve and is a convenient base for trekking in the Nokrek National Park. The Daribokgre entrance is 9 km (5.6 mi) distant. Other tourist attractions located nearby include Rongbang Falls, Songkal Wari Open River Fish Sanctuary, and the Hoolock Gibbon Rescue Centre at Chinabat.
