= Citrus indica =

Scientific classification
- Kingdom: Plantae
- Clade: Embryophytes
- Clade: Tracheophytes
- Clade: Spermatophytes
- Clade: Angiosperms
- Clade: Eudicots
- Clade: Rosids
- Order: Sapindales
- Family: Rutaceae
- Genus: Citrus
- Species: C. indica

Binomial name
- Citrus indica Yu.Tanaka

Species of fruit and plant

Citrus indica is a species of hybrid Citrus known by the common name Indian wild orange.

It is native to South Asia.

== Taxonomy ==
This wild orange plant was originally characterized as one of the likely ancestors of today's cultivated citrus fruits, if not the main one. It was considered to be the most "primitive" citrus. However, genomic analysis has revealed it to be a citrus hybrid, with maternal citron ancestry and also mandarin orange and unspecified papeda contributions. It can be used as a citrus rootstock for cultivated citrus.

Recent searches of the plant's reported home range confirmed its presence only in Meghalaya, where it grows in the Garo Hills.

== Uses ==
This species is used for medicinal and spiritual purposes by the Garo people. The fruit is used to treat jaundice and stomach conditions in humans and animals, and it was used to treat smallpox. It is also used for spiritual purposes.

== Conservation status ==
This plant is considered to be an endangered species. Threats to the species have included habitat destruction caused by slash-and-burn (jhum) activity. This plant requires a specific microclimate, and appropriate habitat is limited. The Nokrek Biosphere Reserve is an important site for the species, and its presence inspired the creation of the National Citrus Gene Sanctuary within the reserve.
