= Williamnagar =

Williamnagar Simsanggre
- city
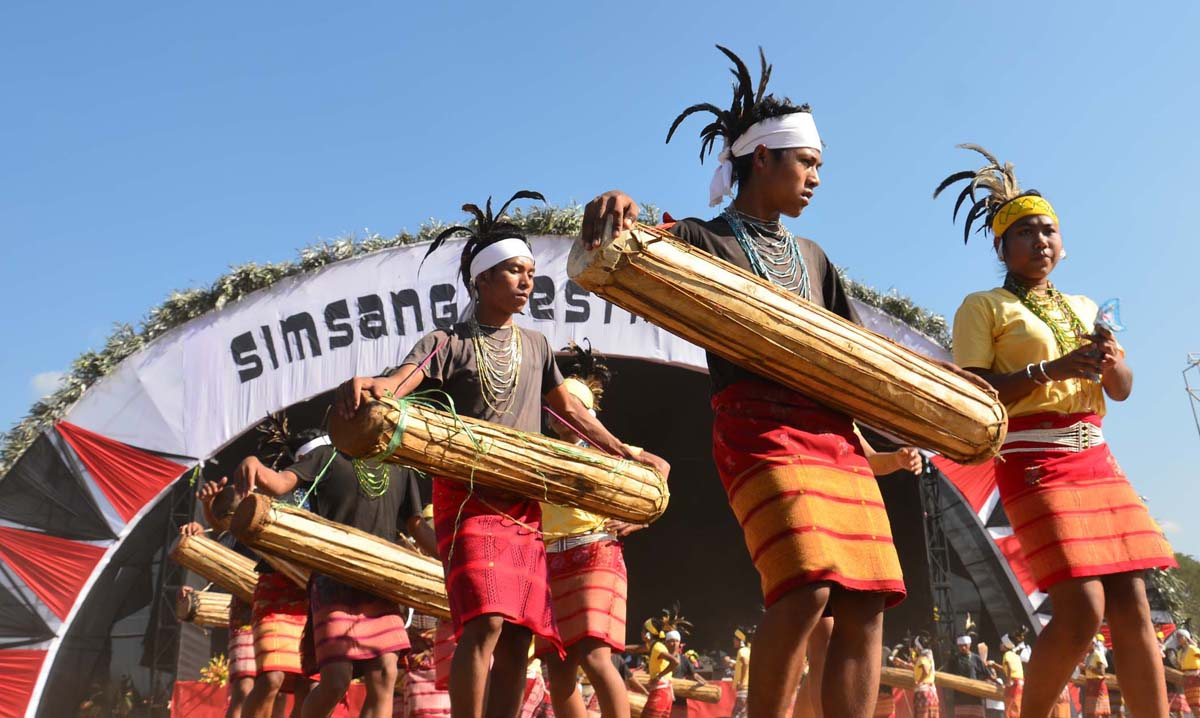
- Simsang Winter Festival

- Location in Meghalaya, India Williamnagar (India)
- Coordinates: 25.4954600°N 90.6168200°E
- Country: India
- State: Meghalaya
- District: East Garo Hills

Population (2001)
  - Total: 18,251

Languages
  - Regional: Garo
- Time zone: UTC+5:30 (IST)
- Postal code: 794111
- Vehicle registration: Ml-07b 3172
- Climate: Cwa

Williamnagar, formerly known as Simsanggre, is the headquarters of East Garo Hills district in the state of Meghalaya in India.

== History ==
Williamnagar, the headquarters complex of the East Garo Hills district of Meghalaya, one of the states of northeastern India, was christened after Captain Williamson A. Sangma, the founding chief minister of the state of Meghalaya. The township was planned around the erstwhile village of Simsanggre, on the vast plainlands along the bank of the Simsang River, in 1976 after the Garo Hills district of yesteryear was re-organised to carve out a new district called East Garo Hills District.

The place where Williamnagar is situated has historical importance, as it was here that the Garos made their last major resistance to the British intrusion into Garo Hills during the year 1837. The legendary Garo leader Pa Togan Nengminja Sangma was felled by the British in a skirmish at Chisobibra, on the outskirts of Williamnagar, on 12 December 1837.

== Demographics ==
As of 2001 India census, Williamnagar had a population of 18,251. Males constitute 52% of the population and females 48%. Williamnagar has an average literacy rate of 67%, higher than the national average of 59.5%: male literacy is 71%, and female literacy is 64%. In Williamnagar, 18% of the population is under 6 years of age.

== Places of interest ==
1. Pa.Togan N Sangma Memorial Park, Chisobibra
2. Simsang River
3. Jadi Dare Park
4. Chibok Dare(Falls)
5. Mrik Wari
6. Rongon (Swimming)
7. Me Dare(Falls)
8. Gitcham(old) Balpakram
9. Bansamgre Picnic Spot
10. Bansamgre Fish Sanctuary
11. Nengmandal Fish Sanctuary
12. Do.be Dare(Falls)
13. Siju Caves
14. Chokpot Falls
15. Katta Beel Lake
16. Rongsu Falls

== Schools and colleges ==
Schools

- Sacred Heart Higher Secondary School, Nengsanggre
- Rongrenggiri Govt. Higher Secondary School, Kusimkolgre
- Rongrenggiri Model Secondary School, Rongreng-Chidekgre
- Bolkinggre Secondary School, Bolkinggre
- Williamnagar Girls Secondary School, Super Market
- Peneul Secondary School, Mount Penuel
- Sunbeam Secondary School, Tambo A'ding
- Educere Higher Secondary School, Kusimkolgre
- Green Hill Secondary School, Balsrigittim
- Greenyard Secondary School, Fishery Colony
- Trinity Secondary School, Kusimkol
- Jawahar Navodaya Vidyalaya Samgong
- Williamnagar Vidya Mandir Secondary School, Super Market
- Simsanggre Secondary School, DC Old Colony
- Balsrigittim MP Secondary School, Balsrigittim
- Riverdale Secondary School, Main Bazar
- Loyola Higher Secondary School, Dawagre
- Ferrando Memorial Secondary School, New Denggagre

Colleges

- Williamnagar Govt. College, Nokgil A'we
- Ramsang College, Kusimkolgre
- Loyola College, New Denggagre
