= East Garo Hills district =

Coordinates: 25.49546°N 90.61682°E

- District of Meghalaya
- Interactive map of East Garo Hills district
- Country: India
- State: Meghalaya
- Headquarters: Williamnagar

Government
  - Lok Sabha constituencies: 1
  - Vidhan Sabha constituencies: 3

Area
  - Total: 2,603 km^{2} (1,005 sq mi)

Population (2001)
  - Total: 317,917
  - Density: 122.1/km^{2} (316.3/sq mi)

Demographics
  - Literacy: 53%
- Time zone: UTC+05:30 (IST)
- Website: eastgarohills.gov.in

East Garo Hills district is an administrative district in the state of Meghalaya in India.

== History ==
The East Garo Hills district was formed in 1976, after the erstwhile Garo Hills district of Meghalaya was re-organised with a view to bring the administration closer to the people.

The district headquarters-complex of the district, christened as Williamnagar, after Captain Williamson A. Sangma, the founder Chief Minister of the State of Meghalaya. Williamnagar is located on the vast plainlands along the bank of the Simsang River, at Simsanggre. These plainlands are in a sense historical, as it was here that the Garos made their last major resistance to the British intrusion into Garo Hills during the year 1837. The legendary Garo leader Pa Togan Nengminja Sangma was felled by the British, in skirmish, at Chisobibra, quite close to Wiliamnagar, on 12 December 1837.

== Geography ==
The district headquarters are located at Williamnagar. The district occupies an area of 2603 km^{2}.

== Divisions ==
=== Lok Sabha ===
The district falls under the Tura (Lok Sabha constituency) which Purno Agitok Sangma had represented at the Lok Sabha, the Lower House of the Indian Parliament during 1975-2016. Purno Agitok Sangma had been a Union Minister and has the distinction of being the only unanimously elected Speaker of the Lok Sabha (during the 11th Lok Sabha). After his death, his son Conrad Sangma represented this constituency.

=== Assembly Constituency ===
There are 3 (three) Assembly Constituencies of the Meghalaya State Legislative Assembly within the East Garo Hills District of Meghalaya. The Assembly Constituencies are as follows:

- SONGSAK (ST)
- RONGJENG (ST)
- WILLIAMNAGAR (ST)

=== Administrative divisions ===
East Garo Hills division is divided into five blocks:

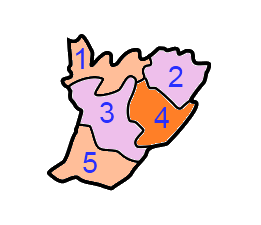
A clickable map of East Garo Hills district exhibiting its five C.D. blocks.

Name	Headquarters	Population	Location
Dambo Rongjeng	Rongjeng		
Kharkutta	Kharkutta		
Resubelpara	Resubelpara		
Samanda	Samanda		
Songsak	Songsak		

== Demographics ==
According to the 2011 census East Garo Hills district has a population of 317,917, roughly equal to the nation of The Bahamas. This gives it a ranking of 569th in India (out of a total of 640). The district has a population density of 122 inhabitants per square kilometre (320/sq mi) . Its population growth rate over the decade 2001-2011 was 26.75%. East Garo Hills has a sex ratio of 968 females for every 1000 males, and a literacy rate of 75.51%.

=== Languages ===
Garo is the most spoken language in the district, with 93.73% as of 2011. East Garo's languages include A'Tong, a Tibeto-Burman language spoken by 10,000 people in Bangladesh and India.

== Flora and fauna ==
In 1986 East Garo Hills district, along with its sister districts South and West Garo Hills, became home to Nokrek National Park. The park has an area of 47 km^{2} (18.1 mi^{2}).
