= Daribokgre =

- Village
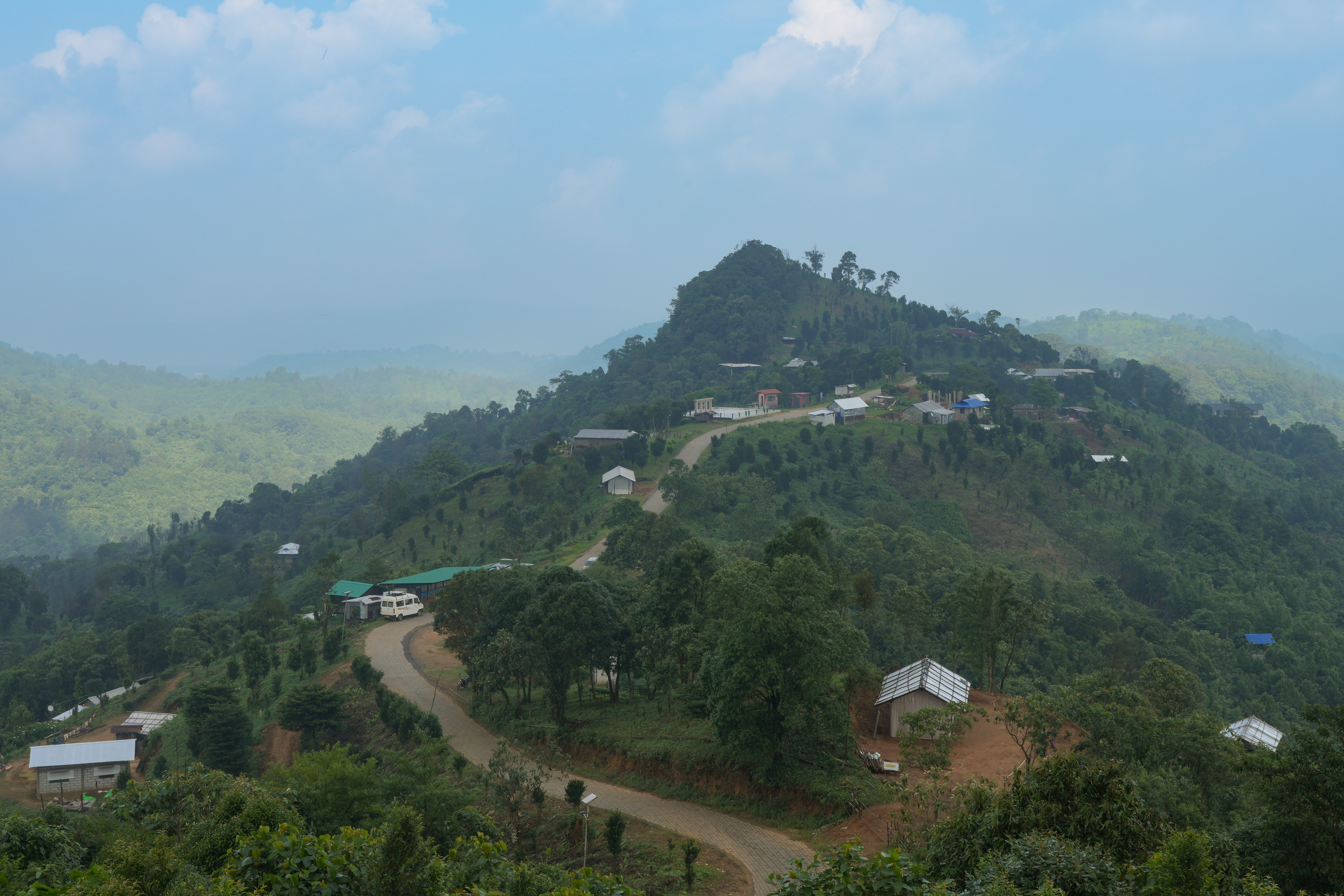
- Daribokgre from the Viewing Deck (south)

- Location within Meghalaya
- Coordinates: 25.49167°N 90.32398°E
- Country: India
- State: Meghalaya
- Elevation: 1,140 m (3,740 ft)

Population (2011)
  - Total: 125

Languages
  - Official: English
- Time zone: UTC+5:30 (IST)
- Postal Index Number: 794111
- Website: https://eastgarohills.gov.in/

Daribokgre is a village in the East Garo Hills district, Meghalaya, India. Daribokgre is located in the Nokrek Biosphere Reserve, close to the Nokrek National Park. The economy is largely agrarian, following the traditional jhum system of rotational slash-and-burn cropping to a limited extent. Most of the houses are traditional bamboo buildings. The traditional Nok-Achik residential building at the entrance to Nokrek offers tourists a glimpse of the traditional Garo way of life.

== Description ==
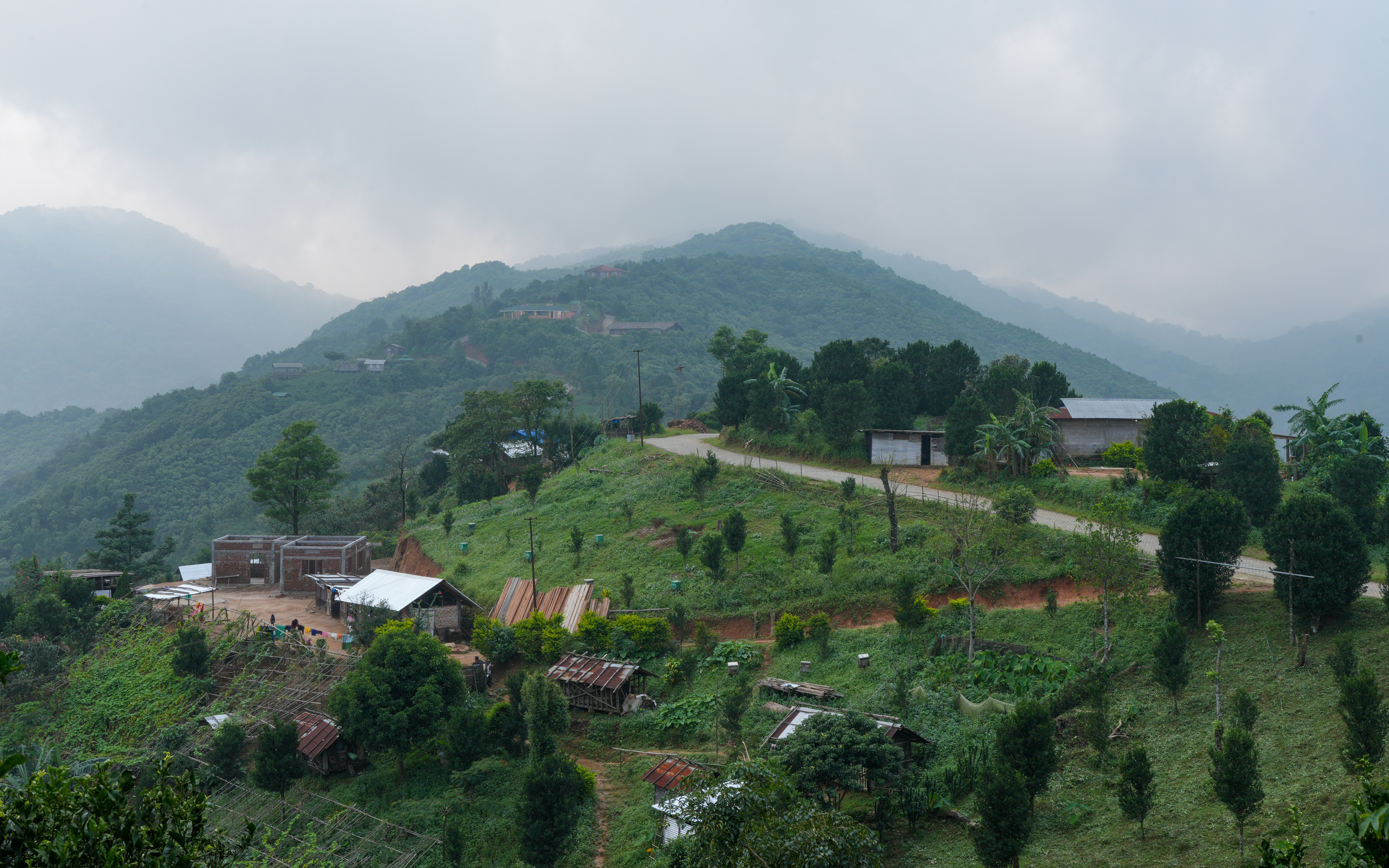
Daribokgre from the north, Nokrek ridge in the distance

Daribokgre village is located in the Samanda Community & Rural Development (C&RD) block in the East Garo Hills district of Meghalaya. It falls under the Williamnagar Assembly constituency and the Tura Lok Sabha constituency. The traditional houses are large bamboo structures called Nokmong. Each accommodates one family. Alongside are granaries (Jam nok), woodsheds and pig sties.

== Geography ==
Daribokgre is situated in the East Garo Hills at an elevation of 1,140 m (3,740 ft). The East Garo Hills run from east to west in the western part of Meghalaya, in the bend of the Brahmaputra river as it turns from west to south. The distance from Daribokgre to Williamnagar, district headquarters, is 51.5 km (32.0 mi). Shillong, the capital of Meghalaya, is 285 km (177 mi) distant.

=== Climate ===
Daribokgre has a tropical climate, hot and humid during the summer and rainy season (March–October) and pleasantly cool during the short winter (December–February). June–August is the period of heavy rain.

== Demographics ==
In 2011, the total population was 125 in 19 households. Among these 48% were female. All 125 people belonged to scheduled tribes; there were no members of scheduled castes. The literacy rate was 64%. In the rural areas of the Samanda sub-district as a whole, Christians were 97.6%, Hindus were 0.01%, and Muslims and Buddhists comprised 0.005% each.

== Governance ==
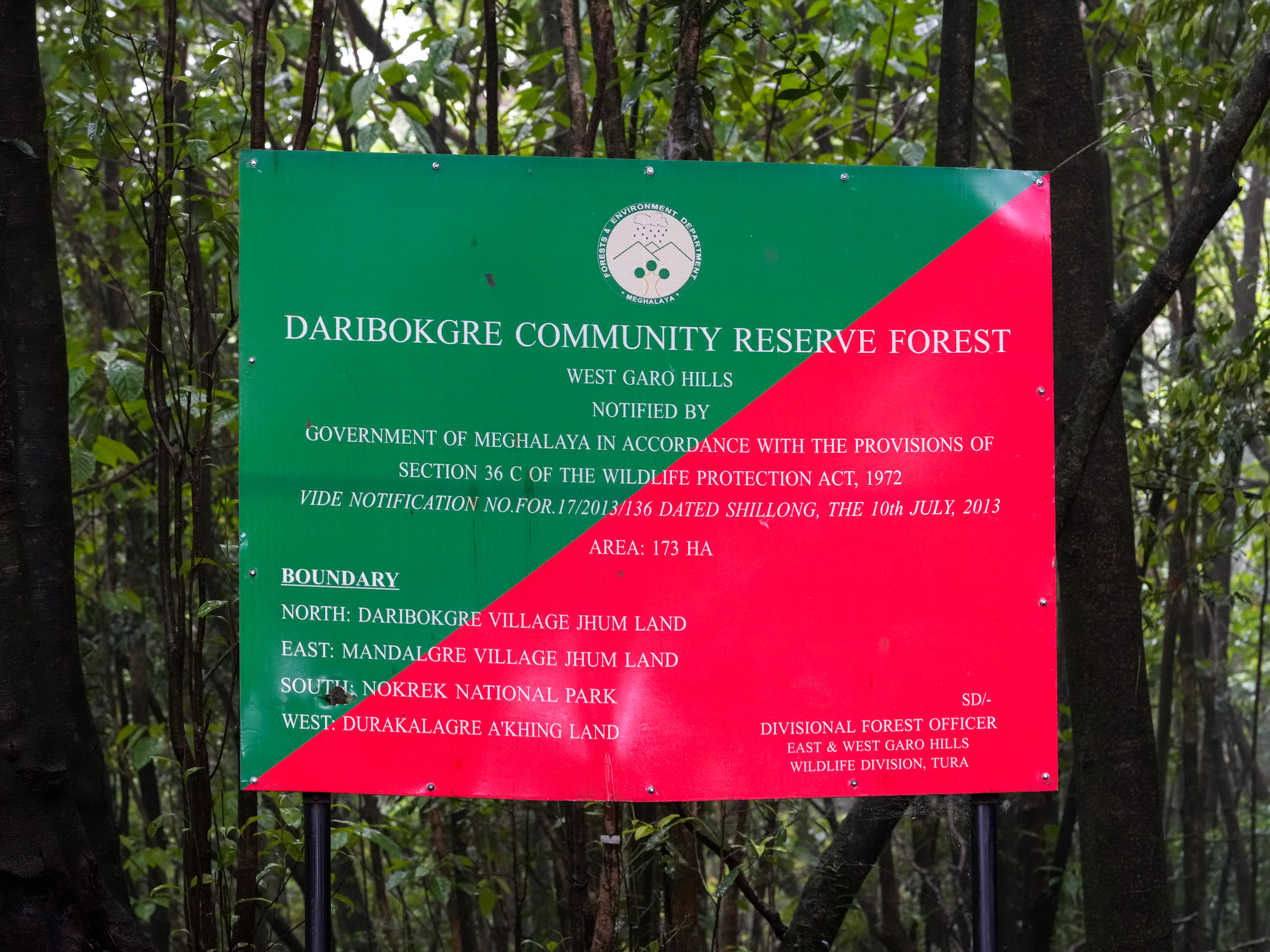
Information, Daribokgre Community Reserve

Traditionally, the village was governed by one or more male nokmas (headmen). These are selected from the leading households of the village based on lineage. The nokma in consultation with the households allots the plots for jhumming every year. He also is responsible for settling disputes. As the Garo society is matrilinal, the nokma typically looks for a young man from his own lineage to marry his daughter. The son-in-law then inherits the household and becomes nokma when the father-in-law dies.

The system has evolved after Indian Independence. The Garo Hills Autonomous District Council passed the Garo Hills District (Jhum) Regulation Act, 1954 that confers on the nokma the right to allot jhum land. However, disputes related to allotment are now referred to the Village Council instead of being resolved by the nokma. Village Councils were created based on the Constitution of Village Council Act in 1958. The Village Council is intended to make each village a self-sufficient, efficiently administered unit. It is responsible for maintenance of public paths, roads, wells, tanks, etc., for registration of births and deaths and other record keeping, etc.

=== Daribokgre Community Reserve ===
Since 2013, the Forest Department, Government of Meghalaya has declared 64 Community Reserves under the Wild Life (Protection) Act, 1972. The Daribokgre Community Reserve with an area of 173 ha (430 acres) was notified on 10 July 2013. The notification gives complete control of the Community Reserve to the community to protect the flora and fauna, and the traditional conservation values and practices. All traditional rites and rituals are permitted, though hunting is not allowed. The Reserve is managed by the Daribokgre Community Reserve Management Committee.

== Amenities ==
As of 2011, pre-primary and primary schooling were available in the village. For higher classes, children had to commute over 10 km (6.2 mi) from Daribokgre. The village has piped water supply. The village pincode is 794111 though there is no post office.

== Economy ==
The economy is largely agrarian. In 2011, people cultivating their own or leased land comprised 50.8% of the main workers (those employed for >6 months in a year).

=== Agriculture ===
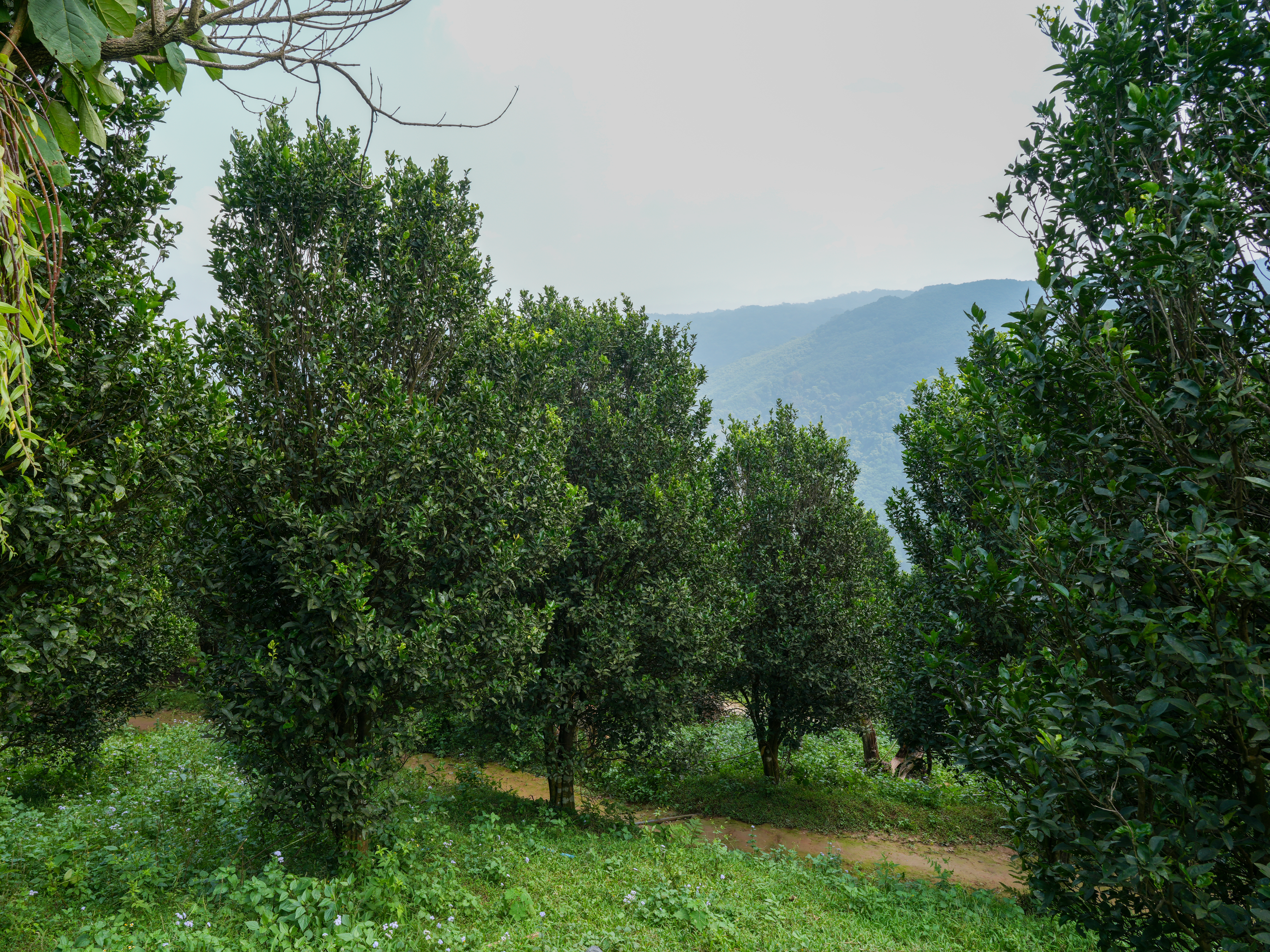
Orange orchard in Daribokgre

The traditional jhum system of rotational cropping is followed to a limited extent. In the jhum system, A'king land is owned by the community. Each year, the Nokma allots plots of A'king land to each household for pre-determined crops. After 2 years of use, a plot is left fallow for 6–8 years during which scrub forest grows. When the plot is again allotted for cropping, the scrub forest is cleared and burnt in a planned operation.K/ref> This traditional cycle of 'slash-and-burn' rotational cultivation is believed to be sustainable ecologically and culturally.

In the first year, the plot is used for vegetables such as sweet potato, ginger, varieties of beans, sugarcane, onions, etc. In the second year, grains such as rice, maize or millet are grown on the plot. Bananas, oranges and pineapples are also grown. Gourds and squashes are grown on frames or on the walls of houses. In some plots, cash crops such as areca, cotton and chilli peppers are planted. The planting of vegetables is somewhat random, adding variety to the diet and improving the soil health. In a few low lying plots, rice is cultivated continuously.

In recent times, some families took advantage of a custom that permitted planting of crops on any land not already covered by the jhum system. They constructed permanent fields in low-lying areas to grow wet rice. Some also planted pineapples, tea, coffee, oranges and areca palms. These families moved their houses away from the central village to the location of their permanent fields. Such permanent fields can be surveyed by the district administration and title (patta) granted to the cultivators. With the title comes the obligation to pay taxes, which is not the case with jhum land. These developments have created greater inequality in the village.

=== Animal husbandry ===
Raising of livestock is common though secondary to agriculture. The main animals in the district are cattle, pigs, goats, and fowl.

== Transport ==
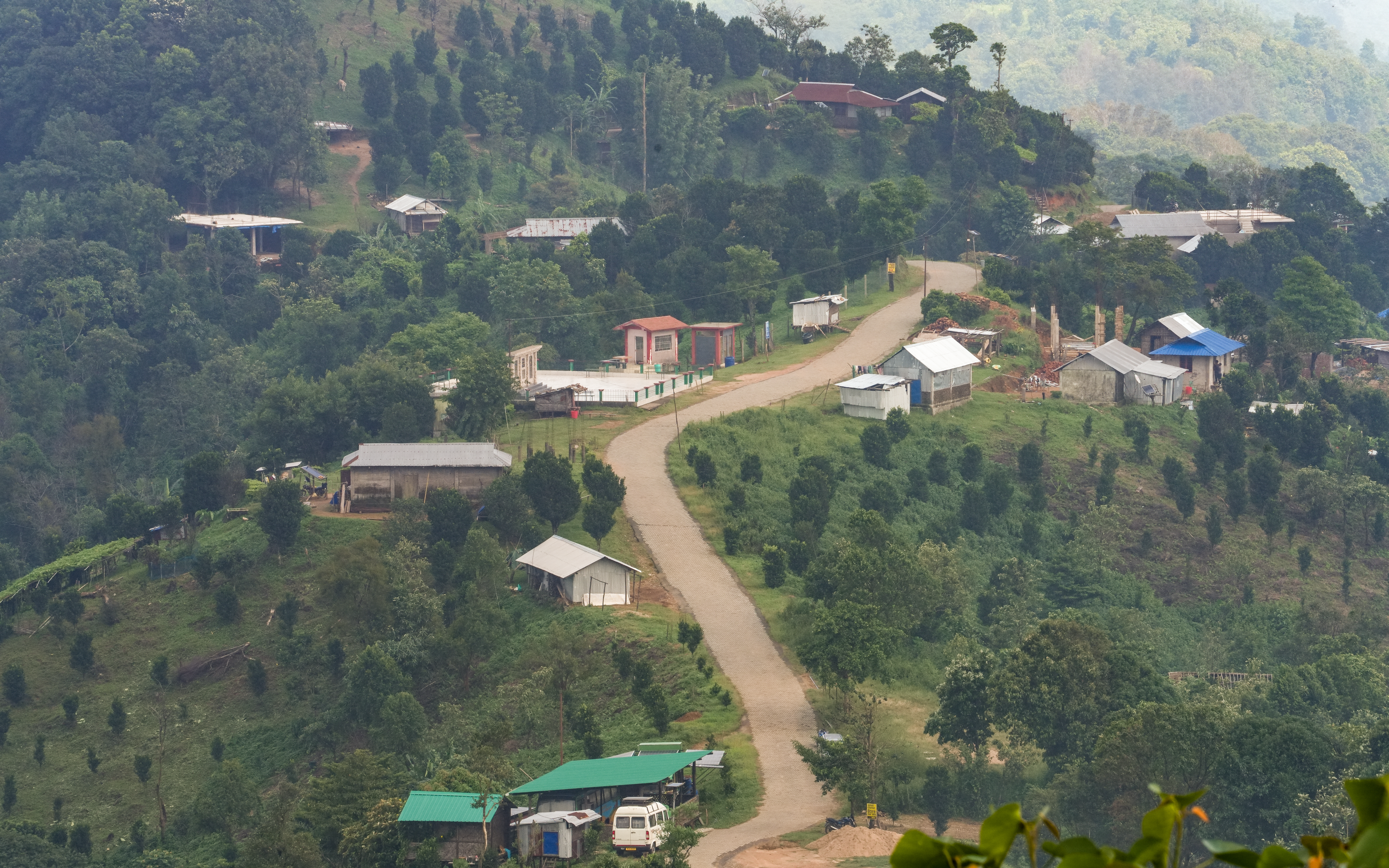
Road from Sasatgre in Daribokgre

Daribokgre is connected to important places in the district by black-topped roads. The Meghalaya Transport Corporation buses run at infrequent intervals. The nearest railway station and airport are in Guwahati, Assam, at distances of 201 km (125 mi) and 217 km (135 mi) respectively.

== Tourism ==
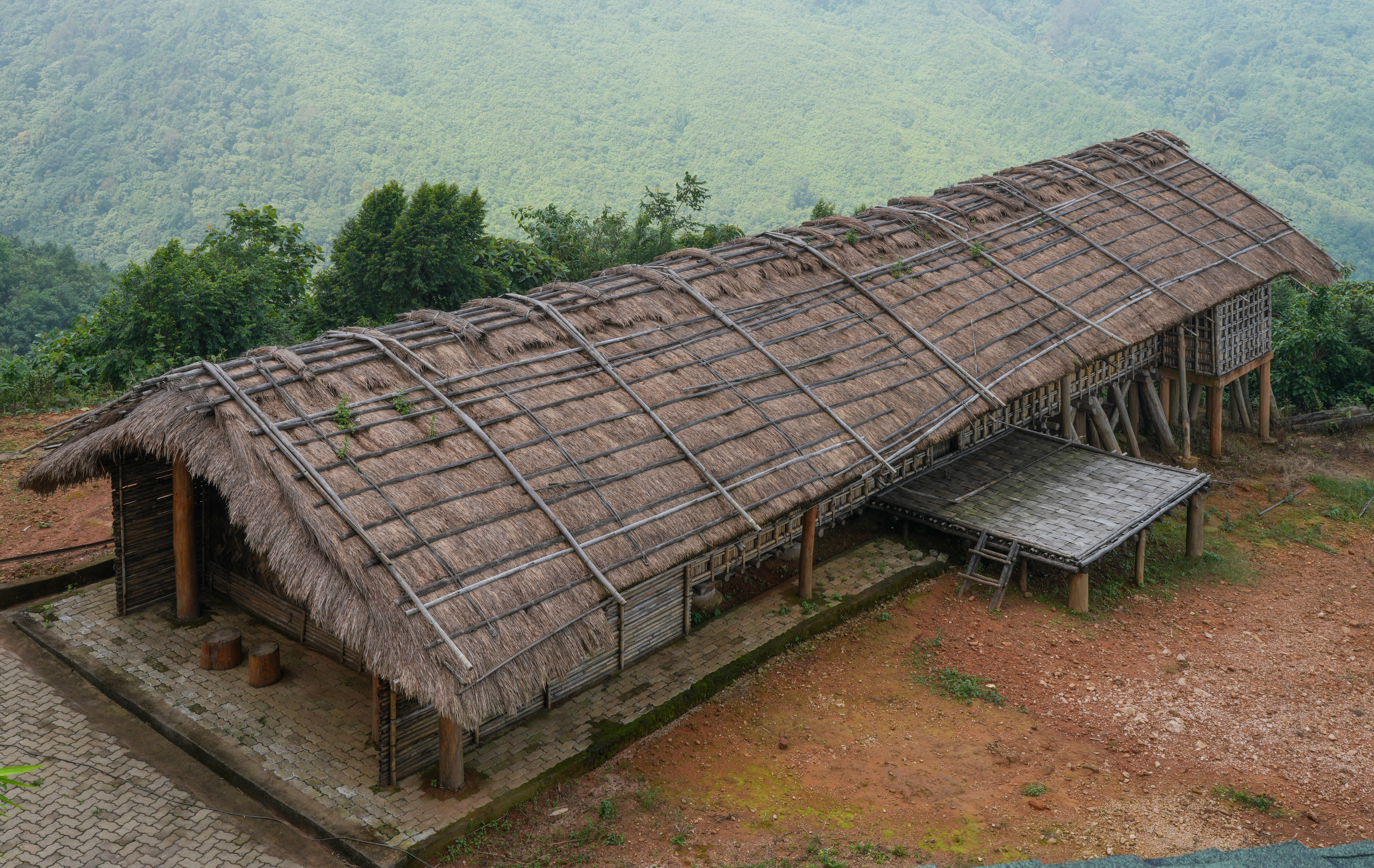
Nokpante bachelors' house, Nok-Achik

Daribokgre is in the Nokrek Biosphere Reserve and is a convenient base for trekking in the Nokrek National Park and Nokrek Peak. Near the entrance to the National Park, visitors can get a glimpse of the traditional Garo lifestyle in the bamboo Nokpante bachelors' house. Several other tourist attractions located nearby include Rongbang Falls, Songkal Wari Open River Fish Sanctuary, the Hoolock Gibbon rescue centre at Chinabat.
