= Nokrek National Park =

National park in India

- Nokrek Biosphere Reserve
- IUCN category II (national park)

- Location within Meghalaya Location within India
- Interactive map of Nokrek National Park
- Location: West Garo Hills district, Meghalaya, India
- Nearest city: Williamnagar, Tura
- Coordinates: 25°32′N 90°7′E
- Area: 47.48 km^{2} (18.33 sq mi)
- Established: 1986; 40 years ago
- Website: www.eastgarohills.gov.in/Tourism/nokrek-biosphere-reserve.html

The Nokrek National Park, the core area of the Nokrek Biosphere Reserve, is a National park located approximately 2 km away from Tura Peak in West Garo Hills district of Meghalaya, India.The Nokrek Biosphere Reserve along with the Nokrek National Park was added by UNESCO to its list of Biosphere Reserves in May 2009. along with the Balpakram National Park in South Garo Hills. The Nokrek area is a hotspot of biodiversity in Meghalaya. Established in 1986, the National Park area comprising around 47.48 km^{2} (18.33 sq mi) is looked after by the Northern Nokrek Range and the Southern Nokrek Range under the East & West Garo Hills Wildlife Division of the Meghalaya State Forest Department, Government of Meghalaya.

The Nokrek National Park is located in the middle of the West, East and North Garo Hills Districts.

== Geography ==
The entire Biosphere Reserve is hilly. The rock is mainly gneiss, granulite, migmatite, amphibolite and banded iron formation, intruded by basis and ultra-basic bodies. In most of the Biosphere Reserve area, the soil is red loam. But sometimes it varies from clayey to sandy loam. The soils in the Biosphere Reserve are rich in organic matter and nitrogen, but deficient in phosphate and potash. The area consists of patchy sedimentary rock composed of pebble bed, sandstone, and carbonaceous shales.

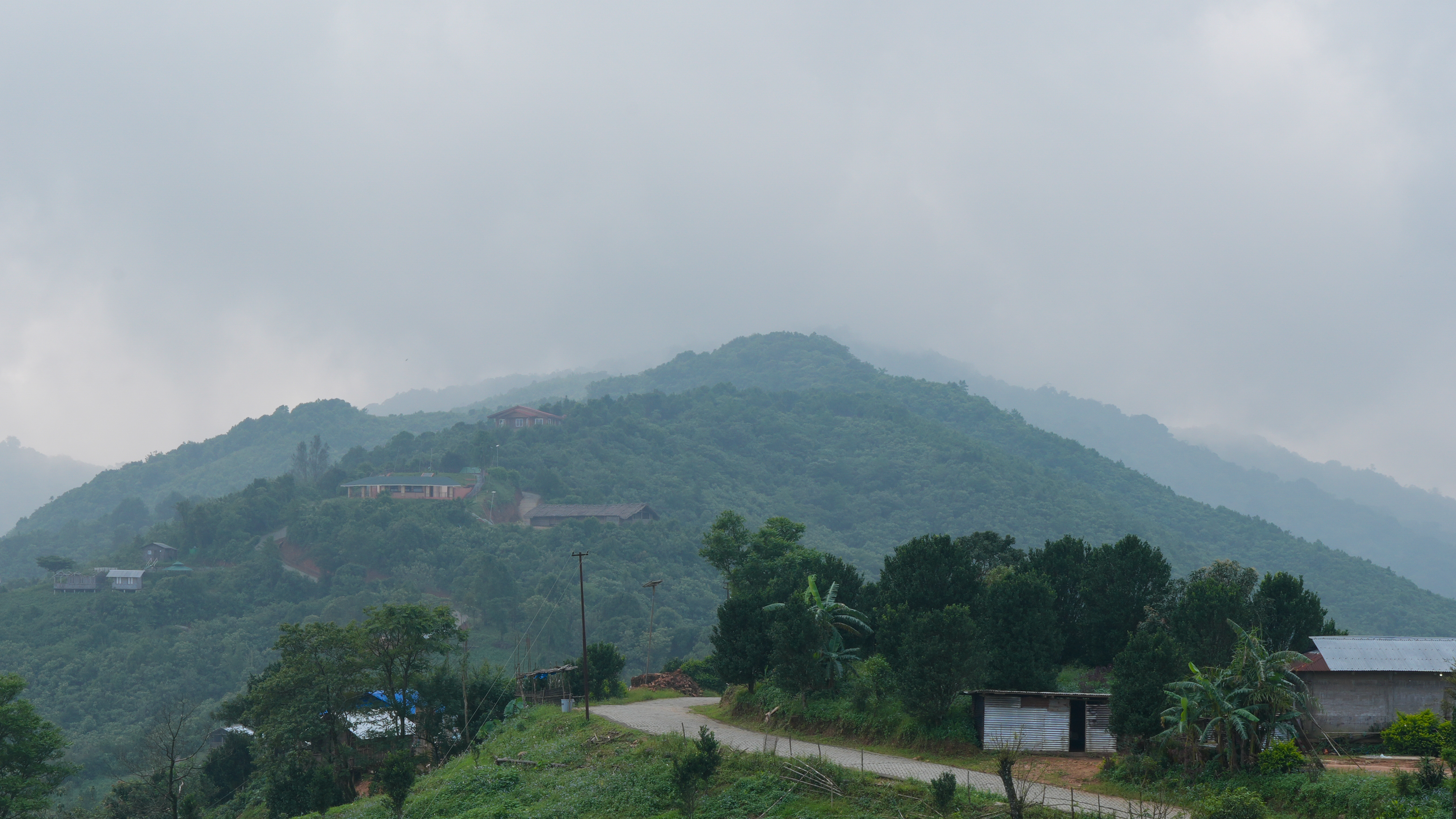
Nokrek ridge seen from Daribokgre

All important rivers and streams of the Garo Hills region rise from the Nokrek Range, of which the river Simsang, known as Someshwari when it emerges into Bangladesh at Baghmara, is the most prominent.

== Notable sites ==
Notable sites in the park include the Nokrek Peak, Nokrek A'pal and the Matcha Nokpante ( meeting places of tiger). Chandigre Rural Tourist Resort is 9 km (5.6 mi) away from Nokrek Gate. Several waterfalls like Wachi Dare and Simsang Dare are located near the Nokrek National Park. The Daribokgre village is the last village on the way to the Northern aspect of the Nokrek National Park and it is the base camp for many travelers, researchers and tourists. On the less travelled and unfrequented southern side, the picturesque villages of Anchigre and Dana Adugre are the last villages enroute to the Southern Aspect of the Nokrek National Park . The southern aspect of the Park can be also be accessed from the adjoining Tura Peak Reserved Forest.

== Fauna and flora ==
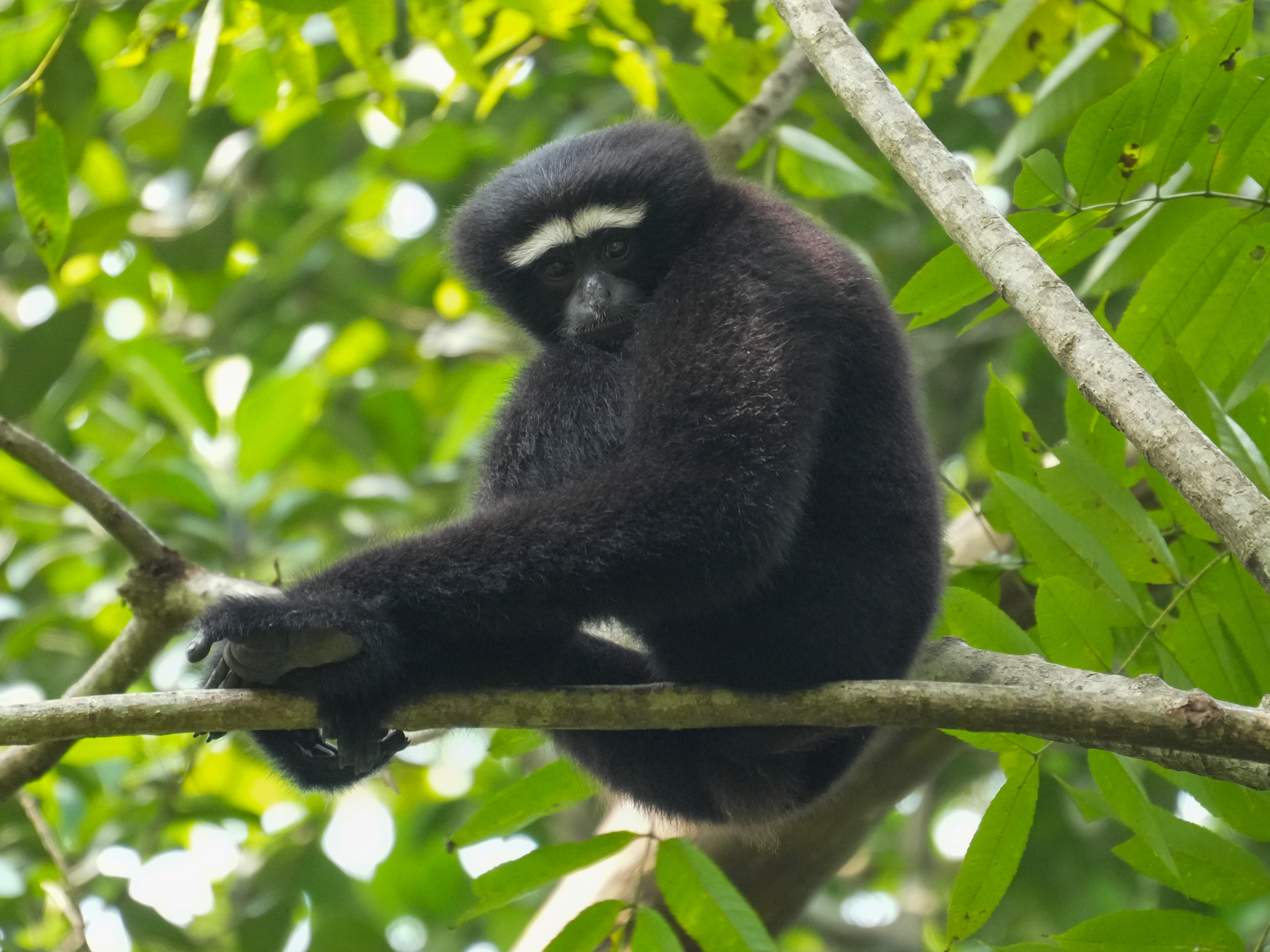
Male Western Hoolock gibbon, Chinabat

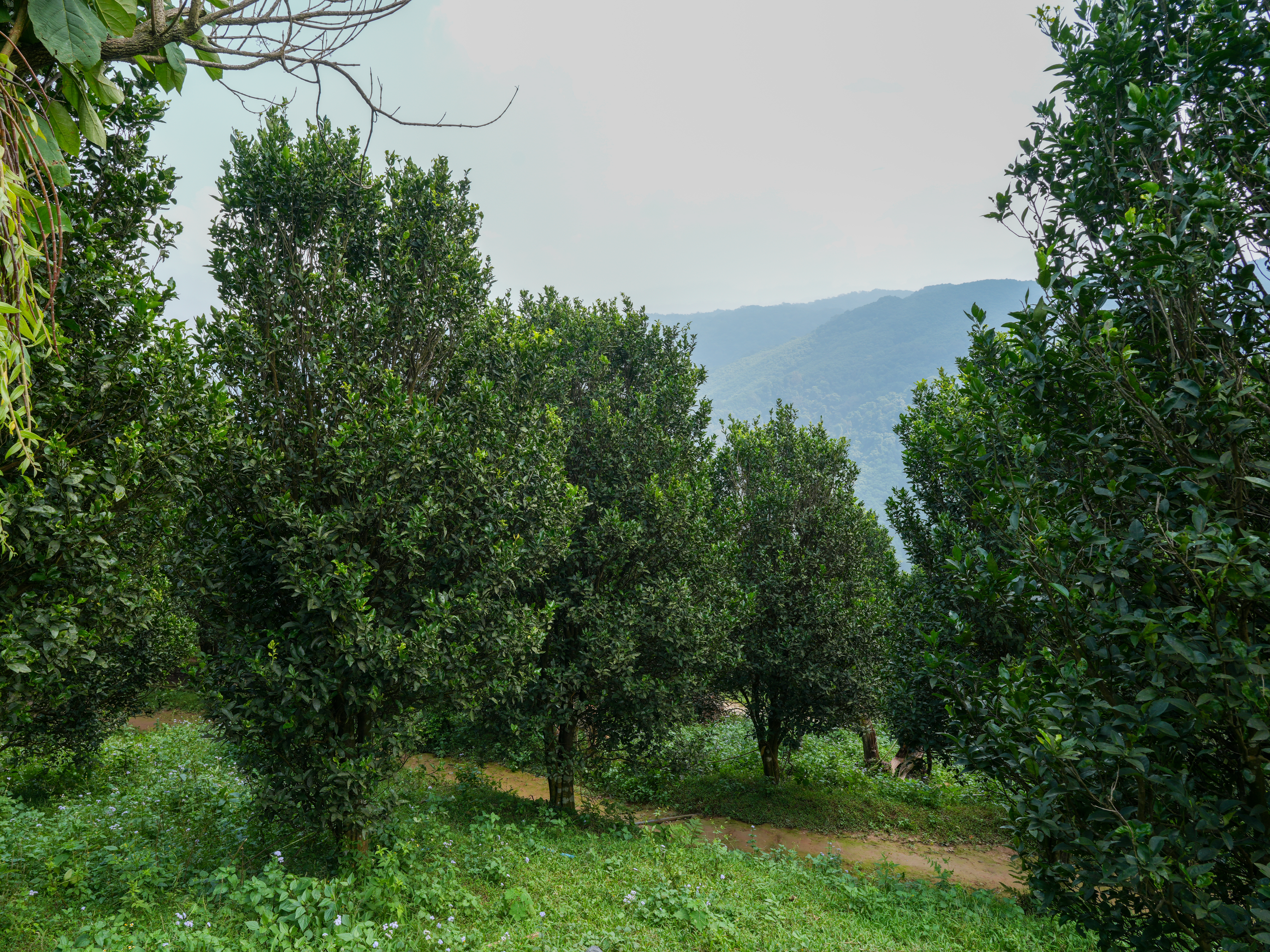
Orange orchard, Daribokgre

There are seven species of primates in Nokrek. The rare stump-tailed macaque is frequently seen near the main trek to the peak. The pig-tailed macaque also occurs. The Western Hoolock gibbon are common and their calls can be heard all over the Nokrek area. The Gaur, common leopard, Chinese pangolin, Ferret Badger, Asiatic Elephant has also been recorded in Camera Traps laid by the State Forest Department. A variety of Snakes have also been recorded in the area, prominent observed and recorded species being the Burmese Python, King Cobra, Spectacled Cobra, vine snake, ornate flying snake, Banded Krait, striped Keelback, red necked keelback Bronzeback species, Viper species. The Nokrek area is also an important habitat of the Asian elephant. The park had eight species of cats, ranging from the Royal Bengal tiger to marbled cat, but the current status of the first is uncertain.

The Nokrek region was believed to host a population of the red panda that had generated curiosity across the world, one of which was accidentally shot by Dr J. Lao in 1960s. However apart from that lone sighting, there has never been any more sightings of the red panda in recent years and hence it is generally believed that that incident was from red pandas brought about by Nepali porters wherein one animal had escaped and was accidentally shot by Dr L. J. Lao.

The Nokrek region is also an Important Bird Area. Birds found here include Oriental Pied Hornbill, Great Pied Hornbill, White-cheeked Hill Partridge, Flavescent Bulbul, Kalij pheasant and Grey Peacock Pheasant. Black Stork and Amur Falcon are seen flying above Nokrek during the migration season.

A variety of plants are found in the park. A canopy of thick, tall, and lush green forests covers Nokrek and its environment. The mother germplasm of Citrus indica (locally known as Memang Narang) has been discovered by science researchers within the Nokrek Range area. This discovery led to the establishment of the National Citrus Gene Sanctuary-cum-Biosphere Reserve covering an area of 47 km^{2} (18 sq mi). The area has wild varieties of citrus fruits that provide a gene pool for commercially produced citrus.

== Administration ==
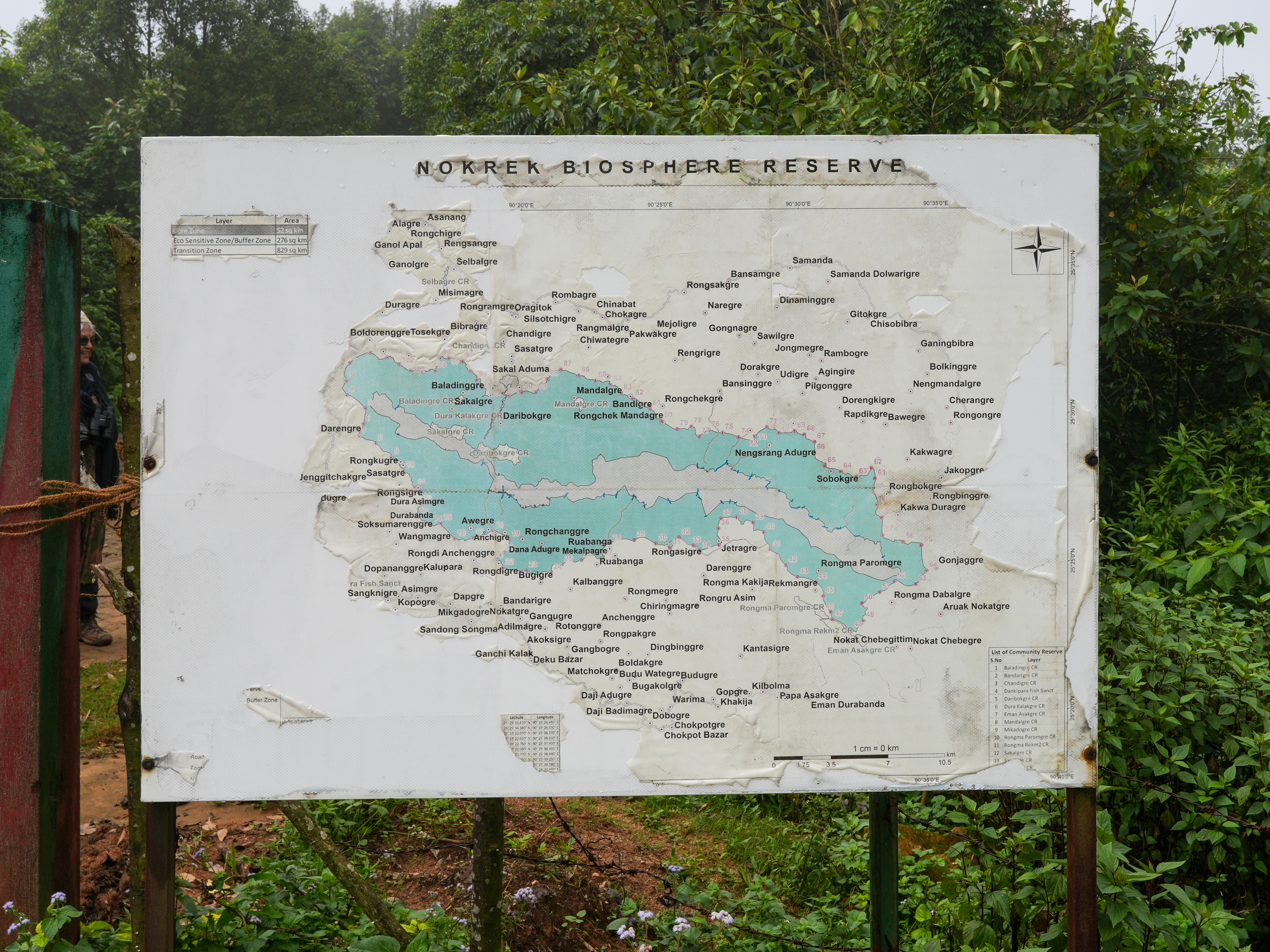
Map of core, buffer and transition zones of Nokrek Biosphere

The Nokrek National Park area is looked after by a State Forest Department Officer of the Rank of Divisional Forest Officer / Deputy Conservator of Forest which is stationed at the headquartered in Tura, West Garo Hills. He/she is assisted by three Forest Range Officers looking after the Northern, Eastern and Southern aspects of the National Park headquartered in Daribokre, Williamnagar and Chokpot respectively. However the control of the buffer and Transition zones of the Nokrek National Park ie the area outside the National Park measuring around 772.52 Square kilometers vests solely with the community / land owner concerned and the State Forest Department has little or no say over what is implemented in the areas outside the Core Area.

After the notification of the Eco Sensitive Zone of the Nokrek National Park vide Government of India's Notification No.SO2877(E) issued on 3 July 2023, an area of 224 km^{2} (86 sq mi) around the Nokrek National Park with an extent of 0.272 to 6.976 Kilometers around the Park has been notified as an Ecosensitive Zone by the Government of India. Preparation of a Zonal Master Plan incorporating the Forest, Water resources, Agriculture, District Council, Tourism, Community and Rural Development, Urban, Municipal, etc is in process. All eco-tourism activities will now have to be as per the Tourism Masterplan for the eco-sensitive Zone. However no new constructions of hotels or resorts are permitted within one km of the park boundary along with a complete blanket ban on commercial mining, stone quarrying or stone crushers, setting up of major hydro-electric projects, discharge of effluents into the water bodies, etc in the immediate Buffer zone of the Eco sensitive Zone.

== Tourist Lodges & Homestays ==
Entry into the Nokrek National Park is regulated by the State Forest Department. Entry permits to the Park are available on payment as per rates fixed by the Chief Wildlife Warden cum Principal Chief Conservator of Forest (Wildlife), Meghalaya. The entire stretch is a No-Plastic Zone and travellers are advised not to carry single use plastic items like disposable water bottles, etc into the Park. Entry into Daribokgre is regulated by the local community.

Accommodation near the Northern Aspect of the National Park is available at a number of home stays and guest houses including:

1. Wildlife Inspection Bungalow, State Forest Department
2. A'chik Heritage Pursuit's Cottage
3. Daribokgre Nokachik
4. Daribokgre Helipad Campsite
5. Sakal Aduma Nokachik
6. Balkasin Homestay / Bambitpa's Homestay
7. Chandigre Rural Tourist Resort
8. Dopatchi Homestay, Sasatgre

== See also ==
- Indian Council of Forestry Research and Education
